= 1961 Washington State Cougars football team =

American college football season

1961 Washington State Cougars football
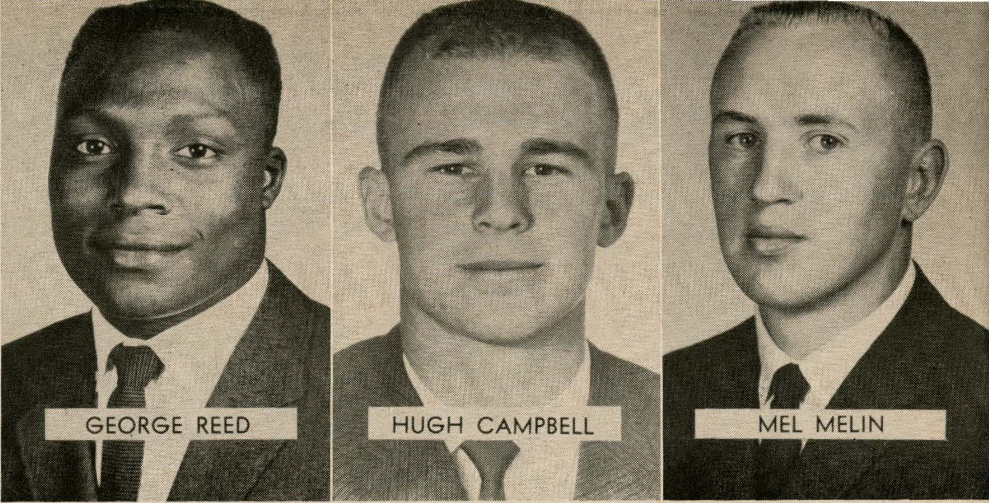
- Fullback George Reed, end Hugh Campbell, quarterback Mel Melin
- Conference: Independent
- Record: 3–7
- Head coach: Jim Sutherland (6th season)
- Home stadium: Rogers Field, Memorial Stadium

1961 Western college football independents records
	Conf.			Overall
Team	W	L	T	W		L		T
No. 17 Arizona		–		8	–	1	–	1
Westminster (UT)		–		7	–	1	–	1
La Verne		–		7	–	2	–	0
Idaho State		–		5	–	2	–	1
San Francisco		–		4	–	2	–	0
Cal Poly Pomona		–		6	–	3	–	0
San Jose State		–		6	–	4	–	0
Eastern New Mexico		–		6	–	4	–	0
Los Angeles Pacific		–		5	–	3	–	0
Montana State		–		4	–	3	–	1
Pacific (CA)		–		5	–	4	–	0
Azusa		–		4	–	3	–	0
Oregon State		–		5	–	5	–	0
Santa Clara		–		3	–	3	–	0
Oregon		–		4	–	6	–	0
Claremont		–		3	–	6	–	0
Air Force		–		3	–	7	–	0
Washington State		–		3	–	7	–	0
Cal Western		–		3	–	7	–	0
Idaho		–		2	–	7	–	0
San Diego		–		2	–	8	–	0
Southern California College		–		1	–	5	–	0
UC Riverside		–		1	–	7	–	0
Pepperdine		–		1	–	9	–	0

The 1961 Washington State Cougars football team was an American football team that represented Washington State University as an independent during the 1961 college football season. In their sixth season under head coach Jim Sutherland, the Cougars compiled a 3–7 record and were outscored 213 to 163.

End Hugh Campbell led the country with 53 receptions and won the W. J. Voit Memorial Trophy as the outstanding college football player on the Pacific Coast. Fullback George Reed led the team in rushing (489 yards) and scoring (48 points), and quarterback Mel Melin led the team in total offense (842 yards).

== Schedule ==
Date	Opponent	Site	Result	Attendance	Source
September 23	at Missouri	Memorial Stadium; Columbia, MO	L 6–28	37,000	
September 30	Utah State	Memorial Stadium; Spokane, WA	L 14–34	13,000	
October 7	at No. 5 Texas	Memorial Stadium; Austin, TX	L 8–41	40,000	
October 14	Idaho	Rogers Field; Pullman, WA (Battle of the Palouse)	W 34–0	19,432	
October 21	at Indiana	Seventeenth Street Stadium; Bloomington, IN	L 7–33	23,307	
October 28	San Jose State	Memorial Stadium; Spokane, WA	L 19–21	7,700	
November 4	at Oregon State	Parker Stadium; Corvallis, OR	L 6–14	16,716	
November 11	Oregon	Rogers Field; Pullman, WA	W 22–21	10,200	
November 18	at Stanford	Stanford Stadium; Stanford, CA	W 30–0	21,000	
November 25	at Washington	Husky Stadium; Seattle, WA (rivalry)	L 17–21	48,500	
Rankings from AP Poll released prior to the game; Source:

== Statistics ==
Washington State ranked fifth nationally in passing offense with an average of 156.1 yards per game. On the ground, they averaged 140.7 yards per game.

The team's passing leaders were quarterbacks Mel Melin (66 of 134 for 814 yards with seven touchdowns and eight interceptions) and Dave Mathieson (50 of 93 for 743 yards with three touchdowns and seven interceptions. Melin, a senior, broke Washington State's career records for total offense (3,135 yards) and pass attempts (452).

The team's rushing leaders were George Reed (489 yards, 131 carries), John Browne (245 yards, 45 carries), Louis Blakely (226 yards, 54 carries), and Ken Graham (178 yards, 47 carries). Reed scored three touchdowns against Oregon, tying a Washington State record for points scored in a single game.

The team's receiving leaders were Hugh Campbell (53 receptions, 723 yards) and Jim Boylan (28 receptions, 412 yards).

The team's scoring leaders were George Reed (48 points) and Hugh Campbell (30 points).

The leaders in total offense were Mel Melin (842 yards) and Dave Mathieson (691 yards).

== Awards ==
Junior end Hugh Campbell led the country with 53 receptions and ranked second with 723 receiving yards. He won the W. J. Voit Memorial Trophy as the outstanding college football player on the Pacific Coast. Campbell was also the only unanimous first-team choice on the 1961 All-Pacific Coast football team. He was selected as a third-team All-American by both the Associated Press (AP) and United Press International (UPI).

Fullback George Reed was named to the second team on the All-Pacific Coast team..

== Personnel ==
=== Players ===
- Mike Abbott, end
- Leroy Babbitt, guard
- Glenn Baker, tackle, 6'3", 225 pounds, sophomore
- Louis Blakely, fullback
- Jim Boylan, right halfback
- Al Branco, guard
- John Browne, left halfback
- Roy Busse, center
- Hugh Campbell, end, 6'1", 190 pounds, junior
- Jerry Campbell, left halfback
- Mike Carboin, end
- Lorin Christean, guard
- Bob Colleran, tackle, 6'0", 230 pounds, senior
- Jerry Conine, guard, 5'11", 205 pounds, junior
- Tim Connors, left halfback
- Bill Cook, end
- John Cooley, guard
- Pat Crook, guard
- Blain Eliot, guard
- Tom Erlandson, center
- George Foster, center
- Bill Gaydosh, left halfback
- Gery Gehrmann, guard
- Bob Giachino, guard
- Ken Graham, right halfback, 6'0", 200 pounds, sophomore
- Harold Haddock, left halfback
- Bob Hoien, tackle
- Bob James, end
- Jim Jensen, tackle
- Ralph Jones, end
- Dean Kalahar, center
- Dave Kerrone, left halfback
- Don Knight, quarterback
- Ron Langhans, end
- Gary Lewis, left halfback
- Mike Martin, tackle
- Dave Mathieson, quarterback, 6'1", 205 pounds, sophomore
- Herm McKee, fullback, 6'3", 210 pounds, sophomore
- Mel Melin, quarterback, 6'0", 195 pounds, senior
- George Reed, fullback, 5'10", 205 pounds, junior
- Larry Reisbig, end
- Mike Rowe, guard
- Paul Rushfeldt, fullback
- Pete Schenck, right halfback, 6'2", 195 pounds, sophomore
- Steve Simmons, tackle
- Wendell Wardell, tackle
- Harvey West, end
- John Wyffels, tackle
- John Zaring, right halfback

=== Coaches and administration ===
- Jim Sutherland - head coach (6th year)
- Stan Bates - athletic director
- C. Clement French - university president
- Ray Blier - assistant coach
- Roy E. Carlson - assistant coach
- Chuck Chatfield - assistant coach
- Ed Cody - assistant coach
- Russ Hampton - assistant coach

=== Professional football draftees ===
The following eight players from the 1961 Washington State team were selected in the professional football drafts:

1962 NFL/AFL drafts

- Mel Melin, picked 45th by the New York Titans in the 1962 AFL draft
- Pete Schenck, picked 128th by the Green Bay Packers in the 1962 NFL draft and 138th by the Denver Broncos in the 1962 AFL draft
- Mike Martin, picked 236th by the Philadelphia Eagles in the 1962 NFL draft and 154th by the Denver Broncos in the 1962 AFL draft
- Herm McKee, picked 275th by the Baltimore Colts in the 1962 draft

1963 NFL/AFL drafts

- Hugh Campbell picked 50th by the San Francisco 49ers in the 1963 NFL draft and 169th by the Oakland Raiders in the 1963 AFL draft
- Dave Mathieson, picked 81st by the Chicago Bears in the 1963 NFL draft and 172nd by the Denver Broncos in the 1963 AFL draft

1964 NFL/AFL drafts

- Kenny Graham, picked 162nd by the Baltimore Colts in the 1964 NFL draft and 104th by the San Diego Chargers in the 1964 AFL draft
- Glenn Baker, picked 178th by the Pittsburgh Steelers in the 1963 draft
