= 1961 Pittsburgh Panthers football team =

American college football season

1961 Pittsburgh Panthers football
- Conference: Independent
- Record: 3–7
- Head coach: John Michelosen (7th season)
- Home stadium: Pitt Stadium

1961 Eastern college football independents records
| | Conf. | | | Overall |
| Team | W | L | T | W | | L | | T |
|---|---|---|---|---|---|---|---|---|
| Middlebury | | – | | 5 | – | 1 | – | 1 |
| Villanova | | – | | 8 | – | 2 | – | 0 |
| Southern Connecticut State | | – | | 7 | – | 2 | – | 0 |
| Alfred | | – | | 6 | – | 2 | – | 0 |
| Montclair State | | – | | 6 | – | 2 | – | 0 |
| Delaware Valley | | – | | 6 | – | 2 | – | 0 |
| No. 17 Penn State | | – | | 8 | – | 3 | – | 0 |
| No. 14 Syracuse | | – | | 8 | – | 3 | – | 0 |
| Trinity (CT) | | – | | 5 | – | 2 | – | 1 |
| Holy Cross | | – | | 7 | – | 3 | – | 0 |
| C. W. Post | | – | | 6 | – | 3 | – | 0 |
| Army | | – | | 6 | – | 4 | – | 0 |
| Merchant Marine | | – | | 6 | – | 4 | – | 0 |
| Tufts | | – | | 5 | – | 3 | – | 0 |
| Rochester | | – | | 5 | – | 3 | – | 0 |
| Hamilton | | – | | 4 | – | 3 | – | 0 |
| Cortland State | | – | | 4 | – | 3 | – | 0 |
| American International | | – | | 5 | – | 4 | – | 0 |
| Colgate | | – | | 5 | – | 4 | – | 0 |
| Northeastern | | – | | 4 | – | 4 | – | 0 |
| Coast Guard | | – | | 4 | – | 4 | – | 0 |
| Ithaca | | – | | 4 | – | 4 | – | 0 |
| Boston University | | – | | 4 | – | 5 | – | 0 |
| Buffalo | | – | | 4 | – | 5 | – | 0 |
| Bridgeport | | – | | 4 | – | 5 | – | 0 |
| Norwich | | – | | 3 | – | 4 | – | 1 |
| Worcester Tech | | – | | 3 | – | 4 | – | 0 |
| Boston College | | – | | 4 | – | 6 | – | 0 |
| Union (NY) | | – | | 3 | – | 5 | – | 0 |
| Pittsburgh | | – | | 3 | – | 7 | – | 0 |
| Nichols | | – | | 2 | – | 3 | – | 0 |
| Trenton State | | – | | 1 | – | 6 | – | 0 |
| King's (PA) | | – | | 1 | – | 8 | – | 0 |
| Springfield | | – | | 0 | – | 7 | – | 1 |
| Brockport | | – | | 0 | – | 7 | – | 0 |
| RPI | | – | | 0 | – | 7 | – | 0 |
| Hobart | | – | | 0 | – | 8 | – | 0 |
Rankings from AP Poll

The 1961 Pittsburgh Panthers football team was an American football team that represented the University of Pittsburgh as an independent during the 1961 college football season. In their seventh season under head coach John Michelosen, the Panthers compiled a 3–7 record and were outscored by a total of 209 to 145. The team gained an average of 159.6 rushing yards and 83.8 passing yards per game. On defense, they gave up an average of 178.0 rushing yards and 126.2 passing yards per game.

Notable players included quarterback James Traficant, who passed for 437 yards, and later served in the U.S. Congress, but was expelled in 2002 after being convicted of ten felonies; back Paul Martha, who later became a consensus All-American and played seven years in the National Football League (NFL); Fred Cox, who later played 15 years in the NFL and was twice the NFL scoring leader; and offensive lineman Ed Adamchik.

The team played its home games at Pitt Stadium in Pittsburgh.

== Schedule ==
| Date | Opponent | Site | Result | Attendance | Source |
|---|---|---|---|---|---|
| September 16 | at Miami (FL) | Orange Bowl; Miami, FL | W 10–7 | 33,292 | |
| September 30 | Baylor | Pitt Stadium; Pittsburgh, PA | L 13–16 | 41,194 | |
| October 7 | at Washington | University of Washington Stadium; Seattle, WA | L 17–22 | 54,411 | |
| October 14 | West Virginia | Pitt Stadium; Pittsburgh, PA (rivalry) | L 6–20 | 28,450 | |
| October 21 | at UCLA | Los Angeles Memorial Coliseum; Los Angeles, CA | L 6–20 | 27,688 | |
| October 28 | Navy | Pitt Stadium; Pittsburgh, PA | W 28–14 | 36,875 | |
| November 4 | at Syracuse | Archbold Stadium; Syracuse, NY (rivalry) | L 9–28 | 40,000 | |
| November 11 | Notre Dame | Pitt Stadium; Pittsburgh, PA (rivalry) | L 20–26 | 50,527 | |
| November 18 | USC | Pitt Stadium; Pittsburgh, PA | W 10–9 | 34,820 | |
| November 25 | Penn State | Pitt Stadium; Pittsburgh, PA (rivalry) | L 26–47 | 37,271 | |

== Preseason ==
On January 23, Coach Michelosen, preparing for his seventh season as Pitt head coach, learned his head backfield coach, Vic Fusia, accepted the head coaching position at the University of Massachusetts. In early February, Michelosen assigned Lou Cecconi to be offensive backfield coach and Carl DePasqua to be defensive backfield coach. In addition, he hired ex-Pitt quarterback Bill Kaliden to be the freshmen team coach.

On March 27, after two weeks of inclement weather, Michelosen started his seventh spring practice. According to the NCAA, the seventy players vying for roster spots had 36 days to get in 20 days of practice. The sessions ended on April 22 with an intrasquad Blues versus Whites game. The Whites made up of mostly freshmen defeated the Blues 20–6.

On August 21, sixty-six players attended Allegheny College for a two-week, two-a-day fall practice camp. Jim Traficant, Pitt's only quarterback with game day experience, wrenched his knee in a scrimmage and was doubtful for the opening game on September 16. The squad returned to Pittsburgh on September 3 for the start of the fall semester.

== Game summaries ==
=== at Miami (FL) ===
Week 1: Pitt at Miami (FL)

| Team | 1 | 2 | 3 | 4 | Total |
|---|---|---|---|---|---|
| • Pitt | 0 | 0 | 3 | 7 | 10 |
| Miami (FL) | 0 | 7 | 0 | 0 | 7 |

- Date: September 16, 1961
- Location: Orange Bowl
  Miami, FL
- Game start: 3:30 p.m.
- Game attendance: 33,292
- Game weather: rain
- Referee: R. P. Williams

Scoring summary
| 2 | MIAMI | Larry Wilson 5-yard pass from George Mira (Bobby Wilson kick) | MIAMI 7–0 |
| 3 | PITT | Fred Cox 38-yard field goal | Miami 7–3 |
| 4 | PITT | Paul Martha 80-yard run (Cox kick) | PITT 10–7 |

On September 16, the Panthers traveled to Miami, FL to open their season against Andy Gustafson's Miami Hurricanes. The all-time series was tied 3–3. The game was televised on ABC as their game of the week and each team received $100,000. Curt Gowdy and Paul Christman were in the booth, and Jim Simpson was on the sideline. Eight cameras were used to cover the action on the field.

Pitt beat the slightly favored Hurricanes 10–7. After a scoreless first quarter, Miami scored on a pass from George Mira to Larry Wilson. Billy Wilson added the extra point and Miami led 7–0 at halftime. Rain arrived in the third period, but Fred Cox got Pitt on the scoreboard with a 38-yard field goal. Late in the game the Panthers gained possession on their 20-yard line. Quarterback Paul Martha handed off to fullback Jim Clemens, who, in turn, handed off to Fred Cox on a reverse play. Cox went 18 yards and was hemmed in by the Miami defense. He then lateraled to Martha who was trailing the play, and Martha raced the final sixty yards for the touchdown. Cox booted the point after and Pitt went home with a 1–0 record.

Paul Martha's 60-yard touchdown dash led Pitt's rushers. Sam Colella completed 5 of 7 passes for 33 yards and 1 interception. End John Kuprok had 2 receptions for 37 yards. Miami quarterback George Mira completed 9 of 19 passes for 142 yards and 1 touchdown. He also led Miami with 49 yards rushing. Larry Wilson had 4 receptions for 68 yards and 1 touchdown.

The Pitt starting line-up for the game against Miami was Steve Jastrzembski (left end), Gary Kaltenbach (left tackle), Regis Coustillac (left guard), Andy Kuzneski (center), Larry Vignali (right guard), Ed Adamchik (right tackle), Heywood Haser (right end), Sam Colella (quarterback), Jim Clemens (left halfback), Fred Cox (right halfback) and Lou Slaby (fullback). Substitutes appearing in the game for Pitt were Al Grigaliunas, Robert Ostrosky, Tom Brown, Charles Ahlborn, Ralph Conrad, Elmer Merkovsky, Ernest Borghetti, John Kuprok, Joe Kuzneski, Glenn Lehner, Paul Martha, Ed Clark, John Chisdak, Dennis Chillinsky, John Yaccino and Rick Leeson.

=== Baylor ===
Week 2: Baylor at Pitt

| Team | 1 | 2 | 3 | 4 | Total |
|---|---|---|---|---|---|
| Baylor | 0 | 3 | 6 | 7 | 16 |
| • Pitt | 7 | 13 | 0 | 0 | 20 |

- Date: September 30, 1961
- Location: Pitt Stadium
  Pittsburgh, PA
- Game start: 1:30 p.m.
- Game attendance: 41,194
- Game weather: warm sunshine
- Referee: Barney Finn (ECAC, Holy Cross)

Scoring summary
| 2 | BAYLOR | Carl Choate 26-yard field goal | BAYLOR 3–0 |
| 2 | PITT | Al Grigaliunas 40-yard interception return (Fred Cox kick)( | PITT 7–3 |
| 2 | PITT | Cox 16-yard run (kick missed) | PITT 13–3 |
| 3 | BAYLOR | Bob Lane 3-yard pass from Ronnie Stanley (kick missed)( | PITT13–9 |
| 4 | BAYLOR | James Ingram 12-yard pass from Stanley (Choate kick) | BAYLOR 16–13 |

On September 30, the Panthers welcomed the Baylor Bears for their home opener. This was the first meeting between the schools. Coach John Bridgers' squad was 1–0, having won their previous game 31–0 over Wake Forest.

In front of 41,194 fans, the Baylor Bears overcame a 10-point deficit and beat the Panthers 16–13. After a scoreless first quarter, Fred Cox missed a 20-yard field goal, and Baylor drove to the Panthers 6-yard line. The Panthers defense held, and Carl Choate booted a 16-yard field goal to open the scoring. Then Pitt scored twice in under three minutes. Paul Martha fumbled at midfield and Baylor recovered. On second down Pitt end Al Grigaliunis intercepted a Ronnie Stanley pass and raced 40 yards to put Pitt ahead. Fred Cox kicked the extra point for a 7–3 lead. On the first scrimmage play after the kick-off, Elbie Wharton fumbled on the Baylor 41-yard line. On the fourth play, Cox ran 18 yards around left end for the touchdown. Herby Adkins blocked Cox's placement. Pitt led 13–3 at halftime. Baylor scored a touchdown in the third and fourth quarter on touchdown passes from Ronnie Stanley to Bobby Lane (3-yards) and James Ingram (12-yards). Choate converted one placement and Baylor led 16–13. Late in the game Pitt gained possession on their own 33-yard line. Eight plays moved the ball to the Baylor 8-yard line with time running out. Pitt lost 6 yards, threw 1 incomplete pass, then completed one for a 4-yard gain, and finally threw another incompletion-game over.

When asked why he chose to pass from the 8-yard line, Coach Michelosen said “We thought we could score by throwing. So we threw.” Ed Clark gained 46 yards on 6 carries to lead the Panthers ground game. Pitt quarterbacks completed 8 of 20 passes for 72 yards. Baylor was led by Ronnie Bull's 79 rushing yards on 13 carries. Ronnie Stanley completed 6 of 10 passes for 62 yards and two touchdowns. He threw 1 interception.

The Pitt starting line-up for the game against Baylor was Steve Jastrzembski (left end), Gary Kaltenbach (left tackle), Regis Coustillac (left guard), Andy Kuzneski (center), Larry Vignali (right guard), Bob Guzik (right tackle), Heywood Haser (right end), Sam Colella (quarterback), Jim Clemens (left halfback), Fred Cox (right halfback) and Rick Leeson (fullback). Substitutes appearing in the game for Pitt were Al Grigaliunas, Joe Kuzneski, Robert Ostrosky, Tom Brown, Charles Ahlborn, John Holzbach, Ralph Conrad, John Draksler, Elmer Merkovsky, Ernest Borghetti, Ed Adamchik, John Kuprok, Robert Long, John Jenkins, Glenn Lehner, Paul Martha, Jim Traficant, Ed Clark, John Chisdak, Lou Slaby and John Yaccino.

=== at Washington ===
Week 3: Pitt at Washington

| Team | 1 | 2 | 3 | 4 | Total |
|---|---|---|---|---|---|
| Pitt | 0 | 14 | 0 | 3 | 17 |
| • Washington | 8 | 6 | 0 | 8 | 22 |

- Date: October 7, 1961
- Location: University of Washington Stadium
  Seattle, WA
- Game start: 2:00 p.m.
- Game attendance: 54,411
- Game weather: fair and cloudy
- Referee: Lee G. Eisan

Scoring summary
| 1 | WASH | Nat Whitmyer 22-yard pass from Pete Ohler (Whitmyer pass from Ohler) | WASH 8–0 |
| 2 | WASH | Whitmyer 1-yard run ( pass conversion failed)( | WASH 14–0 |
| 2 | PITT | Paul Martha 5-yard run (kick blocked) | WASH 14–6 |
| 2 | PITT | Rick Leeson 2-yard run (John Yaccino pass from Martha)( | TIED 14–14 |
| 4 | PITT | Fred Cox 21-yard field goal | PITT 17–14 |
| 4 | WASH | Lee Bernhardi 42-yard pass from Ohler (Bernhardi pass from Ohler) | WASH 22–17 |

Pitt's second road trip was to Seattle, WA to play the Washington Huskies. Pitt led the all-time series 2–0. The Panthers beat the Huskies in the 1937 Rose Bowl (21–0) and then came to Seattle in 1939 and beat them again (27–6). The Huskies were 1–1 for the season.

For the second game in a row, the Panthers could not hold on to a late lead and lost to the Huskies 22–17. Washington scored in the first quarter on a 22-yard pass from Pete Ohler to Nat Whitmyer. The same two combined for a two- point conversion. Early in the second quarter, the Huskies scored on a 1-yard run by Whitmyer to lead 14–0 (2-point try failed). The Panthers answered with a 5-yard touchdown by Paul Martha and then a 2-yard run by Rick Leeson. They added a two-point conversion on a Martha to John Yaccino pass play to tie the score at halftime. The Panthers took the lead in the fourth quarter on a 21-yard Fred Cox field goal. The Pitt pass defense could not hold the lead. Ohler threw a 42-yard touchdown pass to Lee Bernhardi and the same two connected for the two-point conversion ton give the Huskies the victory.

Pitt gained 9 first downs, rushed for 182 yards and passed for 53 yards. Rick Leeson had 84 yards on 15 carries. Five Panthers attempted passes. They completed 3 of 14. Washington had 17 first downs, gained 219 yards rushing and another 202 yards passing. Kermit Jorgenson had 71 yards on 15 carries and Nat Whitmyer added 65 yards on 13 carries. Pete Ohler completed 6 of 11 passes for 188 yards.

The Pitt starting line-up for the game against Washington was Steve Jastrzembski (left end), Gary Kaltenbach (left tackle), Regis Coustillac (left guard), Andy Kuzneski (center), Larry Vignali (right guard), Bob Guzik (right tackle), John Kuprok (right end), Glenn Lehner (quarterback), Ed Clark (left halfback), Fred Cox (right halfback) and Rick Leeson (fullback). Substitutes appearing in the game for Pitt were Al Grigaliunas, Eugene Sobolewski, Robert Ostrosky, Tom Brown, Ray Popp, Charles Ahlborn, John Holzbach, Ralph Conrad, John Draksler, Ed Adamchik, Robert Long, Sam Colella, Paul Martha, Jim Traficant, Peter Billey, Robert Roeder, Lou Slaby, John Chisdak and John Yaccino.

=== West Virginia ===
Week 4: West Virginia at Pitt

| Team | 1 | 2 | 3 | 4 | Total |
|---|---|---|---|---|---|
| • West Virginia | 7 | 0 | 13 | 0 | 20 |
| Pitt | 0 | 6 | 0 | 0 | 6 |

- Date: October 14, 1961
- Location: Pitt Stadium
  Pittsburgh, PA
- Game start: 1:30 p.m.
- Game attendance: 28,450
- Game weather: chilly
- Referee: Robert W. Van Lengen

Scoring summary
| 1 | WVU | Paul Gray recovered a fumble in the end zone (Glenn Bennett kick) | WVU 7–0 |
| 2 | PITT | Jim Traficant 1-yard run (pass conversion failed) | WVU 7–6 |
| 3 | WVU | Roger Holdinsky 30-yard pass from Fred Colvard (kick failed) | WVU 13–6 |
| 3 | WVU | Holdinsky 31-yard run (Bennett kick) | WVU 20–6 |

On October 14, West Virginia visited Pittsburgh for the 54th renewal of the Backyard Brawl. Pitt led the all-time series 39–13–1, and won 42–0 the previous year. Coach Gene Corum's Mounties were 1–3 on the season. Their 28–0 victory over Virginia Tech the previous week broke an 18-game losing streak.

The game was played on the annual High School and Band Day. Pitt was installed as a 15-point favorite. Paul Martha got the start at quarterback, and Tom Brown replaced the injured Regis Coustillac at left guard.

After a close first half, the Mountaineers dominated the Panthers in the second half, and earned a 20–6 upset. West Virginia opened the scoring in the first quarter with a 74-yard march in 16 plays. On second down from the 5-yard line Tom Woodeshick fumbled into the end zone and Mountaineer end Paul Gray fell on it for the touchdown. Glenn Bennett added the extra point for the 7–0 lead. In the second quarter, Pitt answered with a 50-yard scoring drive. Jim Traficant's quarterback sneak from the 1-yard line cut the lead to 7–6. The two-point conversion attempt failed. The second half was all West Virginia as Roger Holdinsky scored on a 30-yard pass from Fred Colvard and then later raced 31 yards around end for the final touchdown. Bennett converted 1 of the 2 placements.

Pitt gained 148 total yards and earned 7 first downs. Fred Cox and Rick Leeson rushed for 47 and 37 yards respectively. Jim Traficant was 4 0f 10 for 44 yards with an interception. Cox caught 3 passes for 40 yards. Mountaineer quarterback Colvard gained 46 yards rushing and completed 4 of 9 passes for 85 yards and 1 touchdown. Holdinsky gained 40 yards rushing and caught 3 passes for 55 yards.

The Pitt starting line-up for the game against West Virginia was Steve Jastrzembski (left end), Gary Kaltenbach (left tackle), Tom Brown (left guard), Andy Kuzneski (center), Larry Vignali (right guard), Bob Guzik (right tackle), John Kuprok (right end), Paul Martha (quarterback), Ed Clark (left halfback), Fred Cox (right halfback) and Rick Leeson (fullback). Substitutes appearing in the game for Pitt were Al Grigaliunas, Robert Long, Elmer Merkovsky, John Maczuzak, Ray Popp, John Zabcar, Charles Ahlborn, John Holzbach, John Draksler, Ed Adamchik, John Jenkins, Eugene Sobolewski, Sam Colella, Jim Traficant, Glenn Lehner,n Peter Billey, Robert Roeder, John Ozimek, Lou Slaby, John Chisdak and John Yaccino.

=== at UCLA ===
Week 5: Pitt at UCLA

| Team | 1 | 2 | 3 | 4 | Total |
|---|---|---|---|---|---|
| Pitt | 0 | 0 | 6 | 0 | 6 |
| • UCLA | 6 | 7 | 0 | 7 | 20 |

- Date: October 21, 1961
- Location: Los Angeles Memorial Coliseum
  Los Angeles, CA
- Game start: 1:30 p.m.
- Game attendance: 27,688
- Game weather: fair
- Referee: Francis P. Brennan

Scoring summary
| 1 | UCLA | Mike Haffner 25-yard run (kick failed) | UCLA 6–0 |
| 2 | UCLA | Bobby Smith 26-yard pass interception (B. Smith kick) | UCLA 13–0 |
| 3 | PITT | Ed Clark 27-yard pass from Fred Cox (pass conversion failed) | UCLA 13–6 |
| 4 | UCLA | Thompson 1-yard run (B. Smith kick) | UCLA 20–6 |

The Panthers third road trip in 5 weeks was to Los Angeles, CA to take on coach Bill Barnes' UCLA Bruins. The Panthers led the all-time series 2–1, and this was Pitt's third trip west in four years to play the Bruins. UCLA was 2–2 for the season and was favored by 7 points.

The Bruins handed the Panthers their fourth loss in a row by a score of 20–6. UCLA scored a touchdown in each quarter except the third. UCLA kicked-off and forced a punt. They proceeded to drive 51-yards for the opening touchdown. Halfback Mike Haffner ran the final 25 yards for the score. Bob Smith missed the extra point. Pitt attempted to answer with a drive to the UCLA 27, but turned the ball over on downs. Later in the quarter, Pitt gained possession on their own 7-yard line. On third down Smith intercepted Jim Traficant's pass and raced 26 yards for the touchdown. Smith added the point after and UCLA led 13–0 at halftime. Pitt finally got on the scoreboard the second time it got the ball in the third quarter. They drove 90 yards, aided by a piling-on penalty and a fake punt. Fred Cox threw a 27-yard touchdown pass to Ed Clark. The two point conversion failed, but the lead was cut to 13–6. UCLA iced the game with a late interception. A Traficant pass to John Jenkins got tipped into the air and caught by Carmen Dipoalo who ran 41 yards to the Pitt 2-yard line. On second down Almose Thompson scored on a 1-yard plunge. Smith's placement made the final 20–6.

Pitt only gained 49 yards rushing, but managed 144 yards passing. Jim Traficant completed 9 of 25 passes for 89 yards and had 3 intercepted. Mike Haffner ran for 120 yards of the 199 total UCLA yardage. The Bruins did not complete a pass.

The Pitt starting line-up for the game against UCLA was Steve Jastrzembski (left end), Gary Kaltenbach (left tackle), Tom Brown (left guard), Andy Kuzneski (center), Larry Vignali (right guard), Ed Adamchik (right tackle), John Kuprok (right end), Jim Traficant (quarterback), Ed Clark (left halfback), Fred Cox (right halfback) and Rick Leeson (fullback). Substitutes appearing in the game for Pitt were Al Grigaliunas, Robert Long, Elmer Merkovsky, John Maczuzak, Robert Ostrosky, Ray Popp, John Zabcar, Charles Ahlborn, John Holzbach, John Draksler, Bob Guzik, Ernie Borghetti, Jeff Ware, John Jenkins, Paul Martha, Peter Billey, Robert Roeder, Dennis Chillinsky, John Ozimek, Lou Slaby, John Chisdak, John Telesky and John Yaccino.

=== Navy ===
Week 6: Navy at Pitt

| Team | 1 | 2 | 3 | 4 | Total |
|---|---|---|---|---|---|
| Navy | 0 | 0 | 0 | 14 | 14 |
| • Pitt | 7 | 0 | 14 | 7 | 28 |

- Date: October 28, 1961
- Location: Pitt Stadium
  Pittsburgh, PA
- Game start: 1:30 p.m.
- Game attendance: 36,875
- Game weather: sunny and warm
- Referee: John H. Coles (Westminster)

Scoring summary
| 1 | PITT | Jim Traficant 8-yard run (Fred Cox kick) | PITT 7–0 |
| 3 | PITT | Ed Clark 13-yard run ( Cox kick)( | PITT 14–0 |
| 3 | PITT | Traficant 6-yard run (Cox kick) | PITT 21–0 |
| 4 | PITT | John Jenkins 17-yard pass from Robert Roeder (Cox kick) | PITT 28–0 |
| 4 | NAVY | Bob Hecht 1-yard run (Greg Mather kick) | PITT 28–7 |
| 4 | NAVY | Mather 10-yard pass from Hecht (Mather kick) | PITT 28–14 |

On October 28, the Panthers hosted the Midshipmen of the Naval Academy. Pitt led the all-time series 6–2–1. Coach Wayne Hardin's favored squad had a 4–1 record, and was on a 4-game win streak. 1,900 cadets (half of the corps) accompanied the team and marched on the field an hour before game time. The drum and bugle corps performed at halftime.

Coach Michelosen's starting line-up was minus 4 injured starters: end Woody Haser, guard Regis Coustillac, tackle Bob Guzik and halfback Bob Clemens. He decided to start Charles Ahlborn at center in place of Andy Kuzneski. During Michelosen's tenure, the Panthers had not lost five games in a row. In 1954 the Panthers ended a 4-game losing streak by beating the Middies 21–19.

The Panthers played their best game of the season and beat the Midshipmen 28–14. Pitt scored all their points before Navy added two late touchdowns against the Panther reserves. The Panthers took the opening kick-off 55 yards for the first score, with quarterback Jim Traficant scrambling the final 8-yards. Halfback Ed Clark and Traficant scored touchdowns in the third quarter. The final tally came on a 17-yard touchdown pass from Robert Roeder to John Jenkins. Fred Cox converted all four placements. Navy scored twice in the last 2 minutes - Robert Hecht on a 1-yard plunge, and then on a 10-yard pass from Hecht to Greg Mather. Mather booted both extra points.

Pitt gained 277 yards rushing and earned 18 first downs. Five Panthers (Ed Clark, Fred Cox, Rick Leeson, Paul Martha and John Yaccino) each gained at least 40 yards. Pitt only completed 2 of 6 passes for 32 yards. The Panthers defense intercepted 3 passes and recovered 3 fumbles. They held the Midshipmen to 11 first downs.

The Pitt starting line-up for the game against Navy was Steve Jastrzembski (left end), Gary Kaltenbach (left tackle), Tom Brown (left guard), Charles Ahlborn (center), Larry Vignali (right guard), Ed Adamchik (right tackle), John Kuprok (right end), Jim Traficant (quarterback), Ed Clark (left halfback), Fred Cox (right halfback) and Rick Leeson (fullback). Substitutes appearing in the game for Pitt were Al Grigaliunas, Joe Kuzneski, Jeff Ware, Robert Ostrosky, John Maczuzak, Ray Popp, Jon Botula, Andy Kuzneski, John Draksler, John Zabcar, Dave Mastro, Elmer Merkovsky, John Jenkins, Robert Long, Eugene Sobolewski, Paul Martha, Glenn Lehner, Sam Collela, Dick Sanker, Peter Billey, Robert Roeder, Bob Clemens, John Yaccino, John Ozimek, Dennis Chillinsky, Ed Billy, Lou Slaby, John Chisdak and John Telesky.

=== at Syracuse ===
Week 7: Pitt at Syracuse

| Team | 1 | 2 | 3 | 4 | Total |
|---|---|---|---|---|---|
| Pitt | 0 | 9 | 0 | 0 | 9 |
| • Syracuse | 0 | 7 | 7 | 14 | 28 |

- Date: November 4, 1961
- Location: Archbold Stadium
  Syracuse, NY
- Game start: 1:30 p.m.
- Game attendance: 41,000
- Game weather: rain
- Referee: Edward G. Myer (Temple)

Scoring summary
| 2 | PITT | John Telesky 2-yard run (kick failed) | PITT 6–0 |
| 2 | PITT | Fred Cox 47-yard field goal ( | PITT 9–0 |
| 2 | SYR | Ernie Davis 8-yard run (Ken Ericson kick) | PITT 9–7 |
| 3 | SYR | John Mackey 11-yard pass from Dave Sarette (Ericson kick) | SYR 14–9 |
| 4 | SYR | Davis 3-yard pass from Sarette (Ericson kick) | SYR 21–9 |
| 4 | SYR | Sarette 12-yard run (Ericson kick) | SYR 28–9 |

On November 4, the Panthers final road trip was to Syracuse, NY to play Ben Schwartzwalder's Orangemen. Pitt led the all-time series 9–5–2, but had lost 3 of the previous 4 meetings.The Orange were 4–2 for the season and were led by Heisman Trophy winner Ernie Davis and future all-pro tight end John Mackey. The Panthers defense held Davis to 37 yards on 13 carries in the 1960 game.

Coach Michelosen put Andy Kuzenski back in the starting line-up at center, and guard Regis Coustillac, tackle Ernie Borghetti and halfback Bob Clemens were available to play.

Pitt lost its fifth game 28–9. The Panthers started strong, and led 9–0 midway through the second quarter, but Syracuse scored the next 28 points for their fifth win. Late in the first period, the Panthers Fred Cox intercepted a Dave Sarette pass on the Pitt 24-yard line and ran it back to the Syracuse 49. On the first play of the second quarter Joe Telesky went the final 2 yards for the touchdown. Cox missed the extra point. But, the Panthers defense held and forced a punt. A 56-yard drive stalled at the Syracuse 20-yard line and Cox booted a 47-yard field goal. Syracuse answered with a 66-yard drive, highlighted by a 22-yard Sarette pass to John Mackey. Ernie Davis ran the final 25 yards in two plays. Ken Erickson's placement made the half-time score 9–7. Pitt fumbled on their first play of the second half and Syracuse recovered on the Panthers 12-yard line. On second down Sarette threw a 11-yard pass to Mackey for the score. Early in the final quarter the Panthers fumbled, and Syracuse gained possession on the Panther 30-yard line. Davis carried the ball to the 5, and then on second down, caught a 3-yard pass from Sarette for the touchdown. With 19 seconds left in the game, Sarette capped a 91-yard drive with a 13-yard touchdown scamper. Erickson made all extra points.

Pitt gained 227 total yards (146 rushing and 81 passing), and earned 13 first downs. Peter Billey led the Pitt rushers with 36 yards on 5 carries. Syracuse gained 256 yards rushing and Dave Sarette was good on 7 of 11 passing for 72 yards. Ernie Davis gained 119 yards on 22 carries.

The Pitt starting line-up for the game against Syracuse was Steve Jastrzembski (left end), Gary Kaltenbach (left tackle), Tom Brown (left guard), Andy Kuzneski (center), Larry Vignali (right guard), Ed Adamchik (right tackle), John Kuprok (right end), Jim Traficant (quarterback), Ed Clark (left halfback), Fred Cox (right halfback) and Rick Leeson (fullback). Substitutes appearing in the game for Pitt were Al Grigaliunas, Robert Ostrosky, Elmer Merkovsky, Regis Coustillac, Charles Ahlborn, John Holzbach, John Draksler, Ralph Conrad, John Jenkins, Robert Long, Paul Martha, Glenn Lehner, Bob Clemens, Peter Billey, John Yaccino, Lou Slaby, John Chisdak and John Telesky.

=== Notre Dame ===
Week 8: Notre Dame at Pitt

| Team | 1 | 2 | 3 | 4 | Total |
|---|---|---|---|---|---|
| • Notre Dame | 7 | 0 | 12 | 7 | 26 |
| Pitt | 0 | 3 | 10 | 7 | 20 |

- Date: November 11, 1961
- Location: Pitt Stadium
  Pittsburgh, PA
- Game start: 1:30 p.m.
- Game attendance: 50,527
- Game weather: clear and cold
- Referee: Gerald Hogan (Arkansas)

Scoring summary
| 1 | ND | Les Traver 59-yard pass from Frank Budka (Joe Perkowski kick) | ND 7–0 |
| 2 | PITT | Fred Cox 45-yard field goal ( | ND 7–3 |
| 3 | PITT | Cox 2-yard run (Cox kick) | PITT 10–7 |
| 3 | ND | Dick Naab 1-yard run (kick failed) | ND 13–10 |
| 3 | ND | George Cefcik 3-yard run (kick failed ) | ND 19–10 |
| 3 | PITT | Cox 52-yard field | ND 19–13 |
| 4 | ND | Charlie O'Hara 47-yard run (Perkowski kick) | ND 26–13 |
| 4 | PITT | John Kuprok 45-yard pass from Jim Traficant (Cox kick) | ND 26–20 |

On November 11, the Panthers and Notre Dame Fighting Irish played for the 28th time. Notre Dame led the all-time series 16–10–1 but Pitt had won 4 of the past 5 games. Coach Joe Kuharich's Irish came to Pittsburgh with a 3–3 record, having won their first 3, then losing the next three. Kuharich replaced Daryle Lamonica at quarterback with Frank Budka for this game, and guard Nick Buoniconti and end Jim Kelly were healthy.

Coach Michelosen was worried about injuries and told the Post-Gazette: “We polished up both the offense and defense a bit and worked on the kicking game. We did no contact work at all. I think they've had enough of it, and there's no reason to take chances of injuring any more players.” He named Regis Coustiollac and Larry Vignali co-captains for the game.

Notre Dame broke their three game losing streak with a 26–20 victory over the Panthers. The Irish scored in the first quarter on a 59-yard pass from Frank Budka to Les Traver. Joe Perkowski kicked the extra point. Notre Dame spent the remaining first quarter in Pitt territory, but the Pitt defense held and Perkowski missed a field goal. Fred Cox booted a 45-yard field goal in the second quarter to cut the halftime lead to 7–3. Early in the third period, Pitt's Gary Kaltenbach recovered a fumble on the Irish 25-yard line. Cox capped the short drive with a 2-yard run around left end. He added the ensuing extra point for a short-lived 10–7 Pitt lead. After the kick-off, Notre Dame fumbled on the first play. The Panthers returned the favor as Budka intercepted Paul Martha's pass, and the Irish had the ball on their own 28-yard line. They drove 72 yards in 8 plays. Fullback Dick Naab scored through the middle from the 1-yard line. Perkowski missed the extra point. John Yaccino fumbled the kick-off and the Irish gained possession on the Panthers 12-yard line. George Sefcik ran the final 8 yards around right end to increase the Irish lead to 19–10. Mickey Bitsko's placement was blocked by Al Grigaliunas. The Panthers answered with a drive that stalled on the Notre Dame 36-yard line. Cox booted a 52-yard field goal, and Pitt trailed 19–13. The teams traded fumbles and the Irish ended up with possession on the Pitt 47-yard line. On first down, Irish reserve halfback Charlie O'Hara ran through right tackle for the final Notre Dame touchdown. Perkowski kicked the point after. A late 45-yard touchdown pass from Jim Traficant to John Kuprok, and a placement by Cox closed the scoring.

Pitt earned 9 first downs on 77 yards rushing and 190 yards passing. John Telesky led the rushers with 26 yards on 7 attempts. Jim Traficant completed 6 of 9 passes for 158 yards and 1 touchdown. He threw 1 interception. Notre Dame gained 223 yards rushing and 133 yards passing. George Sefcik (58 yards on 12 carries) and Angelo Dabiero (58 yards on 14 carries) led the Irish rushers. Frank Budka completed 5 of 9 passes for 133 yards. Daryle Lamonica was 0 for 5 with 1 interception.

The 50,527 fans were entertained by the sight of a live panther on the sideline for the first time in decades. Unfortunately, the animal was spooked by the noise from the fans and bands, and ended up sleeping in a station wagon for most of the game.

The Pitt starting line-up for the game against Notre Dame was Steve Jastrzembski (left end), Gary Kaltenbach (left tackle), Tom Brown (left guard), Andy Kuzneski (center), Larry Vignali (right guard), Ed Adamchik (right tackle), Robert Long (right end), Jim Traficant (quarterback), Peter Billey (left halfback), Fred Cox (right halfback) and John Telesky (fullback). Substitutes appearing in the game for Pitt were Al Grigaliunas, Robert Ostrosky, Elmer Merkovsky, Regis Coustillac, Ray Popp, Charles Ahlborn, John Draksler, John Kuprok, Heywood Haser, Paul Martha, Ed Clark, Dennis Chillinsky, John Ozimek, John Yaccino, Lou Slaby, John Chisdak and Rick Leeson.

=== USC ===
Week 9: USC at Pitt

| Team | 1 | 2 | 3 | 4 | Total |
|---|---|---|---|---|---|
| USC | 3 | 0 | 0 | 6 | 9 |
| • Pitt | 0 | 7 | 0 | 3 | 10 |

- Date: November 18, 1961
- Location: Pitt Stadium
  Pittsburgh, PA
- Game start: 1:30 p.m.
- Game attendance: 34,820
- Game weather: cold
- Referee: David H. Buchanan (Temple)

Scoring summary
| 1 | USC | Carl Skvarna 25-yard field goal | USC 3–0 |
| 2 | PITT | Rick Leeson 3-yard run (Fred Cox kick) | PITT 7–3 |
| 3 | PITT | Cox 43-yard field goal | PITT 10–3 |
| 4 | USC | Hal Bedsole 27-yard pass from Bill Nelsen (pass conversion failed) | PITT 10–9 |

The USC Trojans were the Homecoming Game opponent on November 18. USC led the all-time series 4–3. Second-year Coach John McKay's squad was 4–3–1. Two members of his starting line-up (end Ben Rosin and halfback Ken Del Conte) did not make the trip due to injury, but his roster had a number of future pros: end Hal Bedsole, tackle Marv Marinovich, fullback Ben Wilson, tackle Frank Buncom, halfback Willie Brown, and quarterbacks Pete Beathard and Bill Nelsen.

The 2–6 Panthers were a touchdown favorite. Michelosen told The Pitt News: “Eastern football can't be all that bad. We're rated eighth in the East (Lambert Trophy ratings) and still we're rated six and a half points better than a team that might go to the Rose Bowl (USC).”

In front of 34,820 shivering fans, the Panthers won their third game of the season 10–9. USC scored first on a 25-yard field goal by Karl Skvarna in the opening period. Pitt answered late in the second quarter with a 61-yard drive, capped by Rick Leeson going over right tackle from the 3-yard line. Fred Cox was good on the placement, and Pitt led 7–3 at halftime. After a scoreless third quarter, Cox was good on a 43-yard field goal to extend the Panthers lead to 10–3 midway through the final quarter. Pitt regained possession, but Cox fumbled on the Panthers 37-yard line and USC recovered. The Trojans earned a first down on the 27. On first down quarterback Bill Nelsen threw a touchdown pass to Hal Bedsole. The Trojans attempt at a two-point conversion failed. Nelsen's pass was batted away by Leeson. Pitt ecovered the onside kick attempt and ran out the clock for the victory.

Pitt gained 300 total yards and earned 19 first downs. Fullback Rick Leeson carried 19 times for 80 yards. USC gained 179 total yards and earned 12 first downs. Ben Wilson carried 18 times for 54 yards, and Bill Nelsen completed 6 of 12 passes for 82 yards.

The Pitt starting line-up for the game against USC was Steve Jastrzembski (left end), Gary Kaltenbach (left tackle), Tom Brown (left guard), Andy Kuzneski (center), Larry Vignali (right guard), Ed Adamchik (right tackle), John Kuprok (right end), Jim Traficant (quarterback), Ed Clark (left halfback), Fred Cox (right halfback) and Rick Leeson (fullback). Substitutes appearing in the game for Pitt were Al Grigaliunas, Robert Ostrosky, Elmer Merkovsky, Ernie Borghetti, Regis Coustillac, Ralph Conrad, Charles Ahlborn, John Draksler, Robert Long, Heywood Haser, Paul Martha, Dennis Chillinsky, John Ozimek, Lou Slaby, John Chisdak, Peter Billey, Robert Roeder, and John Telesky.

The Pitt Lettermen of Distinction awards were first presented at this Homecoming. The first recipients were: Dr. John B. Sutherland (football coach), Dr. J. Huber Wagner (football), Attorney Harbaugh Miller (track team manager), Dr. Karl Bohren (three-sport star, basketball, baseball and football), Allan K. Collingswood (football manager), Dr. W. S. McElroy (football), George L. Carson (football manager) and G. Herbert McCracken (football and Basketball).

=== Penn State ===
Week 10: Penn State at Pitt

| Team | 1 | 2 | 3 | 4 | Total |
|---|---|---|---|---|---|
| • Penn State | 7 | 12 | 14 | 14 | 47 |
| Pitt | 7 | 7 | 0 | 12 | 26 |

- Date: November 25, 1961
- Location: Pitt Stadium
  Pittsburgh, PA
- Game start: 1:30 p.m.
- Game attendance: 37,261
- Game weather: cold
- Referee: Francis P. Brennan (Canisius)

Scoring summary
| 1 | PSU | Galen Hall 6-yard run with fumble (Don Jonas kick) | PSU 7–0 |
| 1 | PITT | John Jenkins 8-yard pass from Paul Martha (Fred Cox kick) | TIED 7–7 |
| 2 | PSU | Buddy Torris 1-yard run (kick failed) | PSU 13–7 |
| 2 | PITT | Rick Leeson 5-yard run (Cox kick) | PITT 14–13 |
| 2 | PSU | Al Gursky 33-yard pass from (Hall (kick failed) | PSU 19–14 |
| 3 | PSU | Hall 11-yard run (Roger Kochman run ) | PSU 27–14 |
| 3 | PSU | Roger Kochman 8-yard run (pass conversion failed ) | PSU 33–14 |
| 4 | PSU | Gursky 4-yard run (Jonas kick) | PSU 40–14 |
| 4 | PITT | Leeson 49-yard run (kick failed) | PSU 40–20 |
| 4 | PSU | Powell 48-yard pass from Hall (Jonas kick) | PSU 47–20 |
| 4 | PITT | Steve Jastrzembski 18-yard pass from Jim Traficant (pass conversion failed) | PSU 47–26 |

The final game of the season was at home versus Rip Engle's Nittany Lions of Penn State. The Lions were 6–3 for the season and were hoping for a bowl bid. Pitt led the all-time series 33–24–3.

Michelosen used the same starting line-up as the USC game. Nine seniors played their final game for the Panthers: John Kuprok, Steve Jastrzembski, Elmer Merkovsky, Larry Vignali, Regis Coustillac, Andy Kuzneski, Fred Cox, Dick Sanker and John Yaccino. Three seniors were injured and unable to participate: Woody Haser, Bob Guzik and Bob Clemens.

In front of 37,261 fans, the Panthers got drubbed by the Nittany Lions 47–26. The Panthers 3–7 finish was the worst of Michelosen's tenure, as was the 47 points scored by Penn State. Pitt led 14–13 late in the first half, but Penn State added a late touchdown to lead at halftime 19–14. Pitt managed to score two late touchdowns to make the score respectable, but Penn State scored 4 touchdowns in the second half to run away with the victory. Penn State scored first, but Pitt answered. Paul Martha returned the kick-off 60 yards to the State 33-yard line. The drive was capped with an 8-yard touchdown pass from Martha to John Jenkins. Fred Cox booted the extra point. The Panthers answered the second State touchdown with a 75-yard drive. Fullback Rick Leeson ran the final 5 yards for the score. Cox's point after put Pitt ahead 14–13. Pitt regained possession but fumbled on their own 23-yard line. Penn State quarterback Galen Hall threw a touchdown pass to Al Gursky on first down. The two-point conversion attempt failed. Don Jonas, wearing no pads due to a separated shoulder, came into the game to kick the point. It was a fake and Hall dropped back to pass. He could not find an open receiver and threw a pass to Jonas in the flat. Jonas immediately tried a drop-kick that came up short. State scored three unanswered touchdowns to open the second half, and added another after Rick Leeson raced 49-yards to put Pitt on the board in the second half. Cox made the extra point. Pitt managed to score another touchdown on a 18-yard pass from Jim Traficant to Steve Jastzembski. The two-point conversion attempt failed.

Pitt managed 15 first downs and 297 total yards gained. Rick Leeson led the Pitt rushers with 96 yards on 13 carries. Jim Traficant completed 5 of 8 passes for 82 yards. Penn State had 24 first downs and 439 total yards. Buddy Torris led the Lions with 66 yards on 22 carries. Quarterback Galen Hall completed 11 of 14 passes for 256 yards.

The Pitt starting line-up for the game against Penn State was Steve Jastrzembski (left end), Gary Kaltenbach (left tackle), Tom Brown (left guard), Andy Kuzneski (center), Larry Vignali (right guard), Ed Adamchik (right tackle), John Kuprok (right end), Jim Traficant (quarterback), Ed Clark (left halfback), Fred Cox (right halfback) and Rick Leeson (fullback). Substitutes appearing in the game for Pitt were Al Grigaliunas, Joe Kuzneski, John Jenkins, Robert Ostrosky, Elmer Merkovsky, Ernie Borghetti, Regis Coustillac, Ray Popp, Ralph Conrad, Charles Ahlborn, John Draksler, Robert Long, Paul Martha, Glenn Lehner, Sam Colella, Dennis Chillinsky, John Ozimek, John Yaccino, Lou Slaby, John Chisdak, Peter Billey, Robert Roeder, and John Telesky.

== Postseason ==
On December 12, assistant line coach Jack Wiley resigned from Coach Michelosen's staff to pursue a sales position with the C. L. Balfour Company and Taylor Publishing Company. On December 21, Michelosen named Frank Lauterbur the new Pitt line coach. He was previously the defensive line coach at Army. In addition, the Panthers rehired Ernie Hefferle as end coach. He previously held the same position at Pitt from 1951 - 1959.

Guard Larry Vignali was chosen to play for the North in the 25th Blue-Gray game in Montgomery, AL on December 30. He was also named to All-American teams: first team All-East, second team NEA (Newspaper Enterprise Association), and third team UPI (United Press International), AP (Associated Press) and AFCA (American Football Coaches Association).

== Coaching staff ==
1961 Pittsburgh Panthers football staff
| Coaching staff: John Michelosen – head coach; Jack Wiley – head line coach; Carl DePasqua –defensive backs coach; Walter Cummins – center coach; Steve Petro – guard coach; Lou Cecconi – backfield coach; Bill Kaliden – freshman coach; Joe Pullekines – assistant freshman coach | Support staff: Frank Carver– athletic director; J. Clyde Barton – assistant athletic director; Walter Cummins – assistant athletic director; Carroll Cook– athletic publicity director; Dr. W. K. Smith – team doctor; Dr. Chester Phillips – team doctor; Howard Waite – trainer; Roger McGill – trainer; William Connelly – student manager |

== Roster ==
1961 Pittsburgh Panthers football roster
| Player | Position | Games | Weight | Height | Class | Prep School | Hometown |
|---|---|---|---|---|---|---|---|
| Ed Adamchik* | tackle | 10 | 226 | 6 ft 2 in | sophomore | Johnstown H. S. | Johnstown, PA |
| Charles Ahlborn* | center | 10 | 200 | 6 ft 2 in | sophomore | Rostraver Twp. H. S. | Belle Vernon, PA |
| Peter Billey* | halfback | 8 | 170 | 5 ft 9 in | sophomore | Hurst H. S. | United, PA |
| Ed Billy | halfback | 1 | 175 | 5 ft 11 in | sophomore | Clairton-Bullis Prep H. S. | Clairton, PA |
| Ernest Borghetti* | tackle | 6 | 235 | 6 ft 4 in | sophomore | Ursuline H. S. | Youngstown, OH |
| John Botula | end | 1 | 196 | 6 ft | sophomore | South Hills H. S. | Pittsburgh, PA |
| Tom Brown* | guard | 10 | 1968 | 6 ft | junior | Munhall H. S. | Munhall, PA |
| Paul Cercel | center | 0 | 210 | 6 ft 1 in | sophomore | Austintown-Fitch H. S. | Youngstown, OH |
| Gerald Cherry | tackle | 0 | 225 | 6 ft | sophomore | West Mifflin H. S. | Munhall, PA |
| Dennis Chillinsky* | halfback | 6 | 190 | 6 ft | sophomore | Plum H. S. | Plum Borough, PA |
| John Chisdak* | fullback | 10 | 185 | 6 ft | junior | Scranton Central H. S. | Scranton, PA |
| Robert Chisdak | end | 0 | 185 | 6 ft | sophomore | Scranton Central H. S. | Scranton, PA |
| Ed Clark* | halfback | 10 | 170 | 5 ft 11 in | junior | Indiana H. S. | Indiana, PA |
| Bob Clemens* | halfback | 4 | 200 | 6 ft 1 in | senior | Munhall H. S. | West Mifflin, PA |
| Sam Colella* | quarterback | 7 | 178 | 5 ft 10 in | junior | Baldwin-Kiski H. S. | Baldwin, PA |
| Ralph Conrad* | guard | 6 | 210 | 5 ft 11 in | junior | Altoona H. S. | Altoona, PA |
| Ray Conway | halfback | 0 | 180 | 6 ft | sophomore | Peabody-Shadyside H. S. | Pittsbuhghrgh, PA |
| Regis Coustillac* | guard | 7 | 219 | 6 ft 2 in | senior | Ursuline H. S. | Youngstown, OH |
| Fred Cox* | halfback | 10 | 196 | 5 ft 11 in | senior | Monongahela H. S. | Monongahela, PA |
| John Cullen | center | 0 | 205 | 6 ft | sophomore | Munhall H. S. | Munhall, PA |
| Dick Dobrowolski | tackle | 0 | 215 | 6 ft | sophomore | Tarentum H. S. | Tarentum, PA |
| Ronald Dodson | end | 0 | 195 | 6 ft | sophomore | Altoona H. S. | Altoona, PA |
| John Draksler* | guard | 9 | 215 | 6 ft 1 in | junior | United H. S. | Brush Valley, PA |
| Edmund Ferdinand* | halfback | 0 | 185 | 5 ft 10 in | junior | Hazleton-Fort Union Acad. | Hazleton, PA |
| Marshall Goldberg, Jr. | halfback | 0 | 193 | 5 ft 11 in | sophomore | New Trier Twp. H. S. | Glencoe, IL |
| John Gregg | halfback | 0 | 175 | 6 ft 2 in | sophomore | Mt. Lebanon-Fork Union Acad. | Mt. Lebanon, PA |
| Al Grigaliunis* | end | 10 | 190 | 5 ft 11 in | sophomore | Benedictine H. S. | Cleveland, OH |
| Joe Gudenburr | end | 0 | 185 | 6 ft 1 in | sophomore | Carrick H. S. | Pittsburgh, PA |
| Bob Guzik* | tackle | 4 | 222 | 6 ft 2 in | senior | Cecil Twp. H. S. | Lawrence., PA |
| Heywood Haser* | end | 4 | 205 | 6 ft 1 in | senior | New Kensington H. S. | New Kensington, PA |
| John Holzbach* | center | 5 | 215 | 6 ft 3 in | sophomore | South. H. S. | Youngstown, OH |
| John Hunter | center | 0 | 205 | 5 ft 11 in | sophomore | East H. S. | Youngstown, OH |
| James Irwin | guard/tackle | 0 | 205 | 6 ft | sophomore | Taylor-Allderdice H. S. | Pittsburgh, PA |
| Stave Jaztrzembski* | end | 10 | 203 | 6 ft 3 in | senior | Vandergrift H. S. | Vandergrift, PA |
| John Jenkins | end | 6 | 205 | 6 ft 4 in | sophomore | Union Area Joint H. S. | New Castle, PA |
| Gary Kaltenbach* | tackle | 10 | 233 | 6 ft 2 in | junior | Clairton H. S. | Clairton, PA |
| John Kuprok* | end | 10 | 199 | 6 ft 1 in | senior | Duquesne H. S. | Duquesne, PA |
| Andrew Kuzneski* | center | 10 | 211 | 6 ft 2 in | senior | Indiana Joint H. S. | Indiana, PA |
| Joe Kuzneski | end | 4 | 180 | 6 ft 3 in | sophomore | Indiana Joint H. S. | Indiana, PA |
| Rick Leeson* | fullback | 0 | 194 | 6 ft 1 in | sophomore | Scott Twp. H. S. | Scott Twp., PA |
| Glen Lehner* | quarterback | 7 | 190 | 5 ft 10 in | sophomore | Baldwin H. S. | Baldwin, PA |
| Marvin Lippincott | halfback | 0 | 193 | 6 ft | sophomore | Phillipsburg H. S. | Riegelsville, NJ |
| Robert Long* | end | 9 | 190 | 6 ft 3 in | sophomore | Sharon H.S. | Sharon, PA |
| John Maczuzak | tackle | 3 | 220 | 6 ft 5 in | sophomore | Ellsworth H.S. | Ellsworth, PA |
| Ronald Marini | tackle | 0 | 200 | 6 ft 1 in | sophomore | Wintersville H. S. | Wintersville, OH |
| Paul Martha* | quarterback | 10 | 180 | 6 ft | sophomore | Shady Side H. S. | Wilkinsburg, PA |
| Dave Mastro | tackle | 1 | 218 | 6 ft 5 in | junior | Baldwin H. S. | Baldwin, PA |
| Elmer Merkovsky, Jr.* | tackle | 10 | 220 | 6 ft 2 in | senior | Wilmerding H. S. | Wilmerding, PA |
| Robert Ostrosky* | end | 9 | 222 | 6 ft 1 in | sophomore | Uniontown H. S. | New Salem, PA |
| John Ozimek* | halfback | 6 | 185 | 5 ft 10 in | sophomore | Burgettstown-Union H. S. | Bulger, PA |
| Dan Picciano | end | 0 | 185 | 6 ft 1 in | sophomore | Jeannette H. S. | Jeanette, PA |
| Ray Popp* | guard | 6 | 205 | 6 ft 1 in | sophomore | Monongahela H. S. | Monongahela, PA |
| John Price | tackle | 0 | 210 | 5 ft 11 in | sophomore | Elmer L. Myers H. S. | Wilkes-Barre, PA |
| Paul Pulsinelli | quarterback | 0 | 195 | 6 ft 2 in | sophomore | McKeesport H. S. | McKeesport, PA |
| Robert Roeder | halfback | 6 | 185 | 5 ft 11 in | sophomore | Emmaus H. S. | Emmaus, PA |
| Carmen Ronca | fullback | 0 | 190 | 6 ft | junior | Linton H. S. | Schenectady, NY |
| Dick Sanker* | quarterback | 1 | 175 | 6 ft | junior | Johnstown Central H. S. | Johnstown, PA |
| Frank Scrip | fullback | 0 | 192 | 6 ft | junior | California. H. S. | Roscoe, PA |
| Lou Slaby* | fullback | 9 | 225 | 6 ft 3 in | junior | Salem H. S. | Salem, OH |
| Eugene Sobelewski | end | 3 | 190 | 6 ft 2 in | sophomore | Freeport H. S. | Freeport, PA |
| Tom Sopkovich | tackle | 0 | 194 | 6 ft 3 in | sophomore | Canfield H. S. | Canfield, OH |
| Jerry Straub | quarterback | 0 | 175 | 6 ft | sophomore | Vinson H. S. | Huntington, WV |
| John Telesky* | fullfback | 6 | 201 | 5 ft 10 in | sophomore | BloomsburgH. S. | Bloomsburg, PA |
| Jim Traficant* | quarterback | 0 | 190 | 6 ft | junior | Cardinal Mooney H. S. | Youngstown, OH |
| Lawrence Vignali* | guard | 10 | 218 | 5 ft 11 in | senior | Masontown H. S. | Masontown, PA |
| Frank Walton | end | 0 | 210 | 5 ft 11 in | sophomore | Beaver Falls H. S. | Beaver Falls, PA |
| Jeff Ware | tackle | 2 | 215 | 6 ft 1 in | sophomore | Camp Hill H. S. | Camp Hill, PA |
| John Yaccino* | halfback | 9 | 190 | 5 ft 11 in | senior | Hazleton H.S. | Hazleton, PA |
| John Zabkar | guard | 3 | 210 | 5 ft 11 in | sophomore | Latrobe H. S. | Latrobe, PA |
* Letterman

== Individual scoring summary ==
1961 Pittsburgh Panthers scoring summary
| Player | Touchdowns | Extra points | Two pointers | Field goals | Safety | Points |
|---|---|---|---|---|---|---|
| Fred Cox | 2 | 11 | 0 | 6 | 0 | 41 |
| Rick Leeson | 4 | 0 | 0 | 0 | 0 | 24 |
| Jim Traficant | 3 | 0 | 0 | 0 | 0 | 18 |
| John Jenkins | 2 | 0 | 0 | 0 | 0 | 12 |
| Paul Martha | 2 | 0 | 0 | 0 | 0 | 12 |
| Ed Clark | 2 | 0 | 0 | 0 | 0 | 12 |
| Steve Jastrzemski | 1 | 0 | 0 | 0 | 0 | 6 |
| John Kuprok | 1 | 0 | 0 | 0 | 0 | 6 |
| John Telesky | 1 | 0 | 0 | 0 | 0 | 6 |
| Al Grigaliunas | 1 | 0 | 0 | 0 | 0 | 6 |
| John Yaccino | 0 | 0 | 1 | 0 | 0 | 2 |
| Totals | 19 | 11 | 1 | 6 | 0 | 145 |

== Statistical leaders ==
Pittsburgh's individual statistical leaders for the 1961 season include those listed below.

=== Rushing ===
| Player | Attempts | Net yards | Yards per attempt | Touchdowns |
|---|---|---|---|---|
| Rick Leeson | 103 | 452 | 4.4 | 4 |
| Ed Clark | 57 | 213 | 3.7 | 1 |
| Paul Marthas | 44 | 212 | 4.8 | 2 |
| Peter Billey | 34 | 155 | 4.6 | 0 |

=== Passing ===
| Player | Attempts | Completions | Interceptions | Comp % | Yards | Yds/Comp | TD |
|---|---|---|---|---|---|---|---|
| Jim Traficant | 67 | 32 | 5 | 47.8 | 437 | 14.0 | 2 |
| Paul Martha | 25 | 7 | 1 | 28.0 | 68 | 9.7 | 1 |
| Ed Clark | 8 | 7 | 1 | 87.5 | 140 | 20.0 | 0 |
| Sam Colella | 22 | 11 | 1 | 50.0 | 111 | 10.1 | 0 |

=== Receiving ===
| Player | Receptions | Yards | Yds/Recp | TD |
|---|---|---|---|---|
| John Kuprok | 18 | 247 | 13.7 | 1 |
| Fred Cox | 12 | 148 | 12.3 | 0 |
| Steve Jastrzemski | 7 | 99 | 14.1 | 1 |
| Paul Martha | 5 | 144 | 28.8 | 0 |

=== Kickoff returns ===
| Player | Returns | Yards | Yds/Return | TD |
|---|---|---|---|---|
| Ed Clark | 8 | 144 | 18.0 | 0 |
| Paul Martha | 7 | 164 | 23.4 | 0 |
| Rick Leeson | 6 | 104 | 17.3 | 0 |

=== Punt returns ===
| Player | Returns | Yards | Yds/Return | TD |
|---|---|---|---|---|
| Paul Martha | 7 | 67 | 9.6 | 0 |
| Ed Clark | 7 | 47 | 6.7 | 0 |
| Peter Billey | 5 | 42 | 8.4 | 0 |

== Team players drafted into the NFL ==
The following Panthers were chosen in the 1962 NFL draft.

| Player | Position | Round | Pick | NFL club |
|---|---|---|---|---|
| Larry Vignali | guard | 10 | 132 | Pittsburgh Steelers |
| John Kuprok | end | 9 | 257 | Pittsburgh Steelers |

== Team players drafted into the AFL ==
The following Panthers were chosen in the 1962 AFL draft.

| Player | Position | Round | Pick | AFL club |
|---|---|---|---|---|
| John Kuprok | end | 23 | 181 | New York Titans |
| Bob Clemens | fullback | 30 | 239 | Houston Oilers |
| Steve Jastrzembski | end | 33 | 262 | Boston Patriots |
