= 1961 Oregon Ducks football team =

American college football season

1961 Oregon Ducks football
- Conference: Independent
- Record: 4–6
- Head coach: Len Casanova (11th season)
- MVP: Kent Peterson
- Captains: Kent Peterson; Mickey Bruce
- Home stadium: Hayward Field; Multnomah Stadium

1961 Western college football independents records
	Conf.			Overall
Team	W	L	T	W		L		T
No. 17 Arizona		–		8	–	1	–	1
Westminster (UT)		–		7	–	1	–	1
La Verne		–		7	–	2	–	0
Idaho State		–		5	–	2	–	1
San Francisco		–		4	–	2	–	0
Cal Poly Pomona		–		6	–	3	–	0
San Jose State		–		6	–	4	–	0
Eastern New Mexico		–		6	–	4	–	0
Los Angeles Pacific		–		5	–	3	–	0
Montana State		–		4	–	3	–	1
Pacific (CA)		–		5	–	4	–	0
Azusa		–		4	–	3	–	0
Oregon State		–		5	–	5	–	0
Santa Clara		–		3	–	3	–	0
Oregon		–		4	–	6	–	0
Claremont		–		3	–	6	–	0
Air Force		–		3	–	7	–	0
Washington State		–		3	–	7	–	0
Cal Western		–		3	–	7	–	0
Idaho		–		2	–	7	–	0
San Diego		–		2	–	8	–	0
Southern California College		–		1	–	5	–	0
UC Riverside		–		1	–	7	–	0
Pepperdine		–		1	–	9	–	0

The 1961 Oregon Ducks football team represented the University of Oregon as an independent during the 1961 college football season. In their eleventh season under head coach Len Casanova and third as an independent, the Ducks compiled a 4–6 record and outscored their opponents 152 to 112. Three home games were played on campus at Hayward Field in Eugene, with two at Multnomah Stadium in Portland.

Sophomore halfback Mel Renfro played on offense, defense, and special teams and tallied 775 yards, including 335 rushing yards, 199 yards on kickoff returns, 99 passing yards, 86 receiving yards, 49 yards on punt returns, and eight yards on an interception return. Renfro was later inducted into the College Football Hall of Fame and the Pro Football Hall of Fame.

Quarterback Doug Post led the team with 673 yards of total offense, including 662 passing yards. End Kent Peterson was selected as the team's most valuable player.

== Schedule ==
Date	Opponent	Site	Result	Attendance	Source
September 23	Idaho	Hayward Field; Eugene, OR	W 51–0	17,800	
September 30	at Utah	Ute Stadium; Salt Lake City, UT	L 6–14	26,578	
October 7	at Minnesota	Memorial Stadium; Minneapolis, MN	L 7–14	50,499	
October 14	Arizona	Multnomah Stadium; Portland, OR	L 6–15	18,651	
October 21	San Jose State	Hayward Field; Eugene, OR	W 21–6	10,200	
October 28	Washington	Multnomah Stadium; Portland, OR	W 7–6	32,681	
November 4	at Stanford	Stanford Stadium; Stanford, CA	W 19–7	27,000	
November 11	at Washington State	Rogers Field; Pullman, WA	L 21–22	10,500	
November 18	at No. 3 Ohio State	Ohio Stadium; Columbus, OH	L 12–22	82,073	
November 25	Oregon State	Hayward Field; Eugene, OR (Civil War)	L 2–6	21,300	
Rankings from AP Poll released prior to the game

== Statistics ==
The team gained an average of 271 yards of total offense per game, consisting of 161 rushing yards and 110 passing yards. On defense, Oregon gave up 251 yards per game of total offense, consisting of 183 rushing yards and 63 passing yards.

Quarterback Doug Post led the team with 674 yards of total offense. He completed 48 of 113 passes (42.5%) for 662 yards with three touchdowns and five interceptions.

Sophomore left halfback Mel Renfro led the team with 775 yards in six phases of the statistics. He was the team's leading rusher, tallying 335 yards and four touchdowns on 61 carries for an average of 5.5 yards per carry. Renfro also had 199 yards and a touchdown on three kickoff returns; 99 passing yards (four-of-eight passing with a 186.5 quarterback rating); 86 receiving yards on seven receptions; 49 yards on two punt returns; and eight yards on an interception return.

In addition to Renfro, the team's other leading rushers were fullback Jim Josephson (287 yards, 81 carries, 3.5-yard average); fullback Duane Cargill (236 yards, 43 carries, 5.0-yard average); right halfback Mike Gaechter (231 yards, 47 carries, 4.9-yard average); halfback Lu Bain (180 yards, 57 carries, 3.1-yard average).

The team's leading receivers were end Kent Petersen (208 yards, 18 receptions); end Paul Burleson (222 yards, 11 receptions), halfbacks Mike Gaechter (167 yards, 11 receptions); and Mel Renfro (86 yards, seven receptions).

Mel Renfro and Lu Bain were the leading scorers with four touchdowns and 24 points each. Jim Josephson and Paul Burleson followed with three touchdowns and 18 points each. Corey was 11-of-16 on extra points kicks and missed all three field goal attempts.

== Awards and honors ==
Two Oregon linemen, tackle Steve Barnett and guard Mickey Ording, received first team honors from the Associated Press on the 1961 All-Pacific Coast football team.

End Kent Peterson was selected by his teammates as the most valuable player (Hoffman Award) on the 1961 Oregon team. Halfback Mike Gaechter won the Albert Dudley Clarke award as the team's most improved player.

Kent Peterson and Mickey Bruce were chosen as the team co-captains.

Mel Renfro was later inducted into both the College Football Hall of Fame and the Pro Football Hall of Fame.

== Personnel ==
=== Players ===
- Lu Bain (#21), halfback, sophomore, 5'11", 183 pounds
- Steve Barnett (#77), tackle, junior, 6'1", 252 pounds
- Paul Burleson (#86), end, sophomore, 6'1", 181 pounds
- Duane Cargill (#40), fullback, junior, 6'0", 196 pounds
- Rich Dixon (#53), center, junior, 6'0", 199 pounds
- Mike Gaechter (#34), right halfback, senior, 6'0", 176 pounds
- Dick Imwalle (#81), sophomore, end, 6'3", 196 pounds
- Jim Josephson (#41), fullback, junior, 5'11", 195 pounds
- Mickey Ording (#67), guard, junior, 6'0", 211 pounds
- Kent Peterson (#83), end, senior, 6'3", 198 pounds
- Mike Post (#10), quarterback, sophomore, 6'1", 193 pounds
- Mel Renfro (#20), left halfback, sophomore, 5'11", 188 pounds
- Ron Snidow (#75), tackle, junior, 6'3", 214 pounds
- Ron Veres (#12), quarterback, junior, 6'0", 180 pounds
- Al Weigel (#62), guard, senior, 6'3", 190 pounds
- Greg Willener (#87), end, junior, 6'3", 197 pounds

==== Gallery ====
Halfback Lu Bain

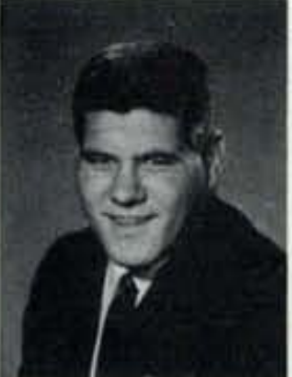
Tackle Steve Barnett

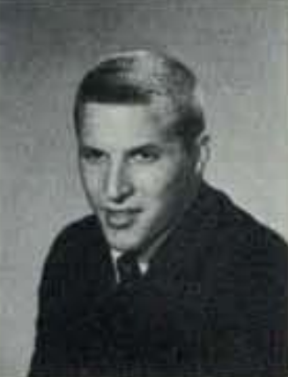
Halfback Mike Gaechter

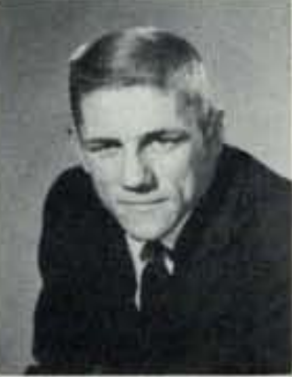
Fullback Jim Josephson

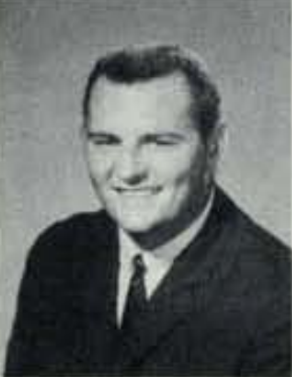
Guard Mickey Ording

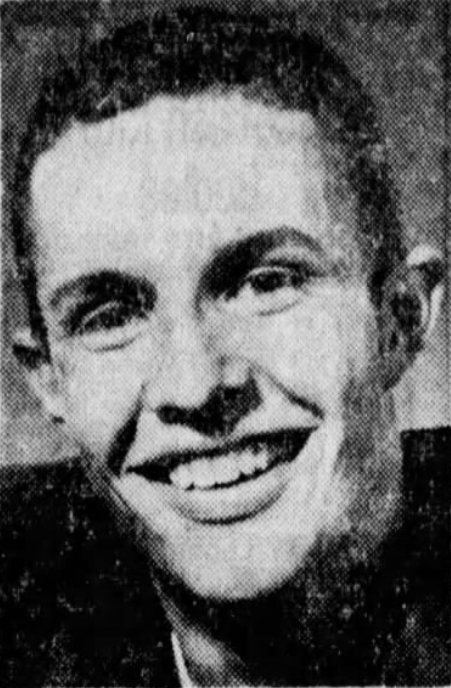
End and MVP Kent Peterson

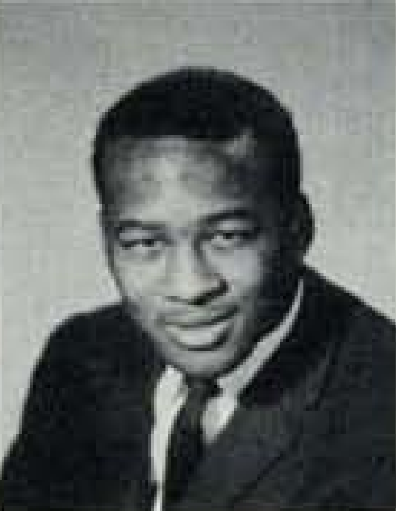
Halfback Mel Renfro

=== Coaching staff ===
- Head coach: Len Casanova
- Assistant coaches: Jack Roche (assistant coach), Max Coley (backfield coach), Jerry Frei (line coach), Phil McHugh (assistant line coach), John Robinson (freshmen coach)
- Athletic director: Leo Harris
- Trainer: Bob Officer
