= 1961 USC Trojans football team =

American college football season

1961 USC Trojans football
- Conference: Athletic Association of Western Universities
- Record: 4–5–1 (2–1–1 AAWU)
- Head coach: John McKay (2nd season)
- Captain: Britt Williams
- Home stadium: Los Angeles Memorial Coliseum

1961 Athletic Association of Western Universities football standings
	Conf.					Overall
Team	W		L		T	W		L		T
No. 16 UCLA $	3	–	1	–	0	7	–	4	–	0
USC	2	–	1	–	1	4	–	5	–	1
Washington	2	–	1	–	1	5	–	4	–	1
Stanford	1	–	3	–	0	4	–	6	–	0
California	1	–	3	–	0	1	–	8	–	1
$ – Conference champion; Rankings from AP poll

The 1961 USC Trojans football team was an American football team that represented the University of Southern California (USC) as a member of the Athletic Association of Western Universities (AAWU), commonly known at the time as the Big 5 Conference, during the 1961 college football season. In their second year under head coach John McKay, the Trojans compiled a 4–5–1 record (2–1–1 in conference games), finished in a tie for second place in the AAWU, and were outscored by a total of 167 to 151. In non-conference games, they defeated SMU and Illinois, but lost to Georgia Tech, Iowa, Notre Dame, and Pittsburgh.

End Hal Bedsole was the leading receiver in the conference with 27 catches for 525 yards and six touchdowns. Bedsole also led the team with 38 points scored. Quarterbacks Bill Nelsen and Pete Beathard combined for 1,165 passing yards, and fullback Ben Wilson led the team with 619 rushing yards.

The team included a large group of sophomores and juniors (including Bedsole, Beathard, Nelsen, Wilson, Willie Brown, Frank Buncom, and Marv Marinovich) who returned to lead the undefeated 1962 USC Trojans football team to a national championship.

The Trojans played their home games at the Los Angeles Memorial Coliseum.

== Schedule ==
Date	Opponent	Site	Result	Attendance	Source
September 22	Georgia Tech*	Los Angeles Memorial Coliseum; Los Angeles, CA	L 7–27	32,928-36,950	
September 29	SMU*	Los Angeles Memorial Coliseum; Los Angeles, CA	W 21–16	29,148	
October 7	No. 1 Iowa*	Los Angeles Memorial Coliseum; Los Angeles, CA	L 34–35	30,263	
October 14	at No. 8 Notre Dame*	Notre Dame Stadium; Notre Dame, IN (rivalry)	L 0–30	50,427	
October 21	at California	California Memorial Stadium; Berkeley, CA	W 28–14	38,000	
October 28	Illinois*	Los Angeles Memorial Coliseum; Los Angeles, CA	W 14–10	28,694	
November 4	at Washington	Husky Stadium; Seattle, WA	T 0–0	55,200	
November 11	Stanford^{†}	Los Angeles Memorial Coliseum; Los Angeles, CA (rivalry)	W 30–15	36,598	
November 18	at Pittsburgh*	Pitt Stadium; Pittsburgh, PA	L 9–10	34,820	
November 25	UCLA	Los Angeles Memorial Coliseum; Los Angeles, CA (Victory Bell)	L 7–10	57,580	
*Non-conference game; ^{†}Homecoming; Rankings from AP Poll released prior to the game

== Statistics ==
Quarterback duties were split between Bill Nelsen and Pete Beathard. Nelson led the team in passing yards (39-for-86, 683 yards, 4 touchdowns, 5 interceptions, 115.8 quarterback rating). Nelson also ranked third in the conference in total offense with 835 yards. Beathard led the team in pass completions (40-for-83, 482 yards, 3 touchdowns, 7 interceptions, 92.0 quarterback rating). Beathard was also the team's second leading scorer with five touchdowns (including a 52-yard punt return for touchdown) for 30 points.

End Hal Bedsole was the conference's leading receiver with 27 catches for 525 yards and six touchdowns. Bedsole also led the team, and ranked third in the conference, with 38 points scored (six touchdowns and a reception for a two-point conversion).

USC had three of the top ten rushers in the conference. Fullback Ben Wilson led the team, and ranked third in the conference, with 619 rushing yards on 139 carries for an average of 4.5 yards per carry. Willie Brown ranked seventh in the conference with 333 yards on 57 carries, and Pete Beathard ranked tenth with 290 yards on 54 carries.

Ernie Jones was the leading punter in the conference, averaging 39.6 yards on 38 punds.

== Awards and honors ==
Five USC players received first-team honors on the 1961 All-Pacific Coast football team selected by the Associated Press (AP), the All-West Coast team selected by the United Press International (UPI), or the all-conference team announced by the AAWU: fullback Ben Wilson (AP-1, UPI-1, AAWU-1); end Hal Bedsole (AP-2, UPI-1, AAWU-1); guard Britt Williams (AP-1, AAWU-1); tackle Frank Buncom (AAWU-1, AP-2); and quarterback Pete Beathard (AAWU-1).

Bedsole was inducted into the College Football Hall of Fame in 2012.

Guard Britt Williams was selected prior to the season to serve as the team captain. He was USC's first solo captain since 1949.

== Personnel ==
=== Players ===
- Chuck Anderson (#61), guard, 210 pounds
- Pete Beathard, quarterback, 190 pounds
- Hal Bedsole (#19), end, 215 pounds
- Willie Brown (#26), halfback, 170 pounds
- Frank Buncom (#78), tackle, 218 pounds
- Mike Bundra (#79), tackle, 230 pounds
- Ken Del Conte (#20), halfback, 175 pounds
- Phil Hoover (#85), end, 190 pounds
- Skip Johnson (#54), center, 187 pounds
- Ernie Jones, kicker
- Pete Lubisch (#69), guard, 195 pounds
- Jim Maples (#33), halfback, 175 pounds
- Marv Marinovich, guard
- Rich McMahon (#43), fullback
- Bill Nelsen (#16), quarterback, 190 pounds
- Ben Rosin (#81), end, 195 pounds
- Hal Tobin (#45), fullback
- Britt Williams (#64), captain and guard, 6'1", 212 pounds
- Ben Wilson (#49), fullback, 215 pounds

=== Coaches and administrators ===
- Head coach - John McKay (third year)
- Assistant coaches - Mel Hein, Roy George, Charlie Hall, Mike Giddings, Marv Goux, Dave Levy, and Joe Margucci
- Athletic director - Jess Hill
- Trainer - Jack Ward
