= 1961 Washington Huskies football team =

American college football season

1961 Washington Huskies football
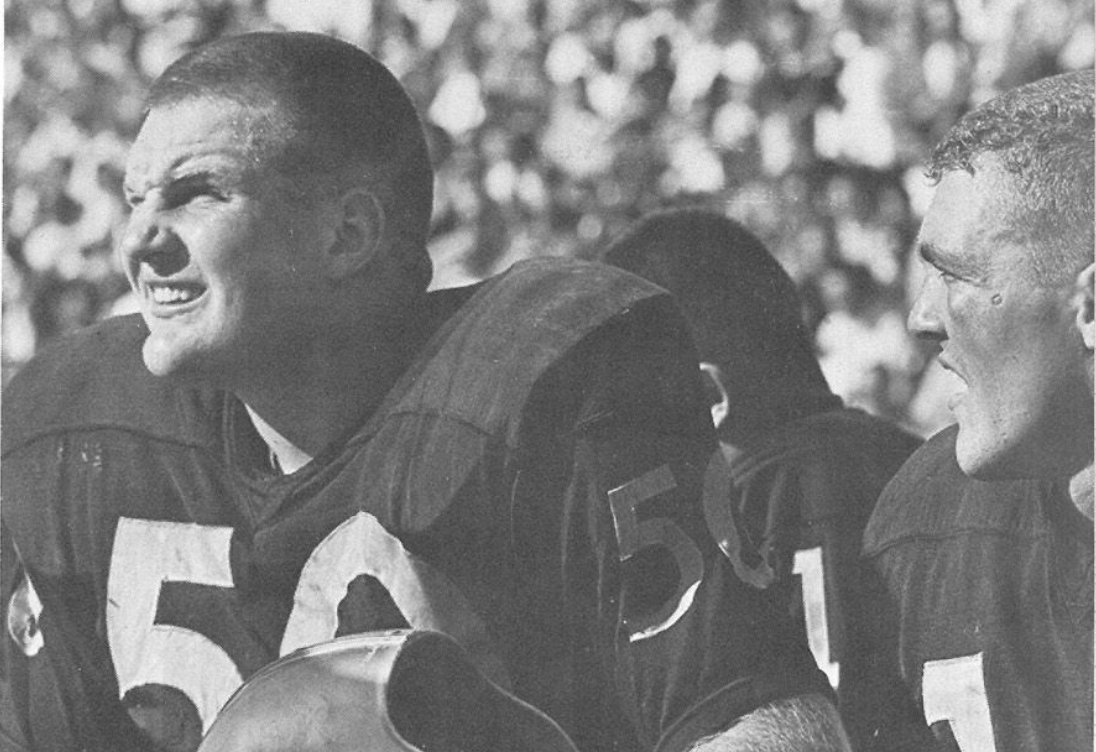
- Center Ray Mansfield and halfback Bill Siler, 1961
- Conference: Athletic Association of Western Universities
- Record: 5–4–1 (2–1–1 AAWU)
- Head coach: Jim Owens (5th season)
- Captains: John Meyers; Kermit Jorgensen
- Home stadium: University of Washington Stadium

1961 Athletic Association of Western Universities football standings
	Conf.					Overall
Team	W		L		T	W		L		T
No. 16 UCLA $	3	–	1	–	0	7	–	4	–	0
USC	2	–	1	–	1	4	–	5	–	1
Washington	2	–	1	–	1	5	–	4	–	1
Stanford	1	–	3	–	0	4	–	6	–	0
California	1	–	3	–	0	1	–	8	–	1
$ – Conference champion; Rankings from AP poll

The 1961 Washington Huskies football team was an American football team that represented the University of Washington as a member of the Athletic Association of Western Universities (AAWU), commonly known at the time as the Big 5 Conference, during the 1961 college football season. In their fifth season under head coach Jim Owens, the Huskies compiled a 5–4–1 record (2–1–1 in conference games), finished in a tie for second place in the AAWU, and outscored opponents by a total of 119 to 98.

Fullback Jim Stiger played on both offense and defense and led the team in rushing (582 yards), total offense (582 yards), and interceptions (five with 51 return yards). Quarterback Kermit Jorgensen was the team captain and ranked second in total offense with 331 rushing yards and 105 passing yards. Halfback Charlie Mitchell, tackle John Meyers, and guard Jim Skaggs received first-team All-Pacific Coast or all-conference honors.

Home games were played on campus in Seattle at Husky Stadium known at the time as University of Washington Stadium.

== Schedule ==
Date	Opponent	Site	Result	Attendance	Source
September 23	Purdue*	University of Washington Stadium; Seattle, WA	L 6–13	54,752	
September 30	at Illinois*	Memorial Stadium; Champaign, IL	W 20–7	41,319	
October 7	Pittsburgh*	University of Washington Stadium; Seattle, WA	W 22–17	54,411	
October 14	at California	California Memorial Stadium; Berkeley, CA	L 14–21	35,000–43,000	
October 21	Stanford	University of Washington Stadium; Seattle, WA	W 13–0	53,200	
October 28	at Oregon*	Multnomah Stadium; Portland, OR (rivalry)	L 6–7	32,681	
November 4	USC	University of Washington Stadium; Seattle, WA	T 0–0	55,200	
November 11	Oregon State*	University of Washington Stadium; Seattle, WA	L 0–3	51,500	
November 18	at UCLA	Los Angeles Memorial Coliseum; Los Angeles, CA	W 17–13	33,969	
November 25	Washington State*	University of Washington Stadium; Seattle, WA (rivalry)	W 21–17	48,500	
*Non-conference game

== Statistics ==
Washington ran a run-oriented offense, averaging 216.9 rushing yards and only 51.3 passing yards per game. On defense, the team held opponents to an average of 149.7 rushing yards and 110.7 passing yards per game.

Fullback Jim Stiger led the team in both rushing and total offense, tallying 582 yards on 130 carries, an average of 4.5 yards per carry. At that time, his rushing total for 1961 was the third best season total in Washington history, trailing only Hugh McElhenny and Credell Green. Stiger also played on defense and led the team with five interceptions and 51 return yards.

Junior halfback Charlie Mitchell ranked second in rushing for the Huskies with 457 yards on 96 carries for a 4.8-yard average. Mitchell also scored the game-winning touchdown against Washington State on a 23-yard run. Mitchell was also the team's leading kickoff returner with 185 yards on five returns.

Senior quarterback Kermit Jorgensen ranked second in total offense with 331 rushing yards and 105 passing yards (10-for-26, 38.5%). Junior quarterback Pete Ohler was the leading passer, completing 17 of 59 (28.8%) for 394 yards with three touchdowns, eight interceptions, and a 74.6 quarterback rating.

The team's leading scorers, each with 20 points, were halfbacks Charlie Mitchell and Nat Whitmyer. Despite missing a game with a broken hand, end Lee Bernhardi was the team's leading receiver with five catches for 137 yards, an average of 27.4 yards per catch. Junior halfback Martin Wyatt led the team in punt returns with 117 yards on six returns, including a 73-yard return for touchdown against California.

Other significant contributors to the Huskies' rushing attack were Bill Siler (205 yards, 33 carries, 6.2-yard average); Martin Wyatt (201 yards, 41 carries, 4.9-yard average); and Nat Whitmyer (151 yards, 40 carries, 3.8-yard average).

== Awards and honors ==
No Washington players received All-America honors. Five were honored on the 1961 All-Pacific Coast football team: halfback Charlie Mitchell (AP-1; BIG5-1); tackle John Meyers (AP-1; BIG5-1); guard Jim Skaggs (AP-2, BIG6-1); center Ray Mansfield (AP-2); and halfback Jim Stiger (AP-2).

== Personnel ==
=== Players ===
- Andy Alkire (#86), end, junior, 210 pounds
- Lee Bernhardi (#91), end, junior, 195 pounds
- Mike Briggs (#76), tackle, sophomore
- Tim Bullard (#58), center, senior, 210 pounds
- Gary Clark (#97), end, junior
- Norm Dicks (#63), guard, junior, 190 pounds
- Kermit Jorgensen (#12), quarterback, senior, 195 pounds
- Glenn Kezer, end, junior
- Dave Kopay (#40), halfback, sophomore
- Tony Kopay (#27), fullback, senior
- Jake Kupp (#81), end, sophomore, 200 pounds
- Duane Locknane (#85), end, junior, 190 pounds
- Ray Mansfield (#50), center, junior, 220 pounds
- John Meyers (#79), tackle, senior, 240 pounds
- Charlie Mitchell (#21), halfback, junior, 182 pounds
- Bob Monroe (#39), halfback, junior, 180 pounds
- John Nelson (#54), center, senior
- Pete Ohler (#16), quarterback, junior
- Dave Phillips (#59), guard, junior, 190 pounds
- Rod Scheyer (#78), tackle, junior, 210 pounds
- Bill Siler (#14), halfback, sophomore, 165 pounds
- Jim Skaggs (#70), guard, senior, 220 pounds
- Rick Sortum (#77), tackle, sophomore
- Chuck Steel (#20), quarterback, sophomore
- Jim Stiger (#35), fullback, junior, 185 pounds
- John Stupey (#67), guard, sophomore
- Nat Whitmyer (#23), halfback, junior
- Martin Wyatt (#36), halfback, junior

=== Coaches ===
- Head coach: Jim Owens
- Assistant coaches: Tom Tipps (head assistant coach, line coach), Chesty Walker (backfield coach), Bert Clark, Dick Heatly, Don White (end coach), Ed Peasley

== Professional football draft selections ==
Two University of Washington Huskies were selected in the 1962 NFL draft, which lasted 20 rounds with 280 selections. One of those Huskies was also selected in the 1962 AFL draft, which lasted 34 rounds with 272 selections.

= Husky Hall of Fame

League	Player	Position	Round	Pick	Franchise
NFL	John Meyers	Tackle	3rd	31	Los Angeles Rams
NFL	Jim Skaggs	Guard	10th	139	Philadelphia Eagles
AFL	John Meyers	Tackle	4th	25	Oakland Raiders
