= 1961 UCLA Bruins football team =

American college football season

1961 UCLA Bruins football

AAWU champion

Rose Bowl, L 3–21 vs. Minnesota
- Conference: Athletic Association of Western Universities

Ranking
- AP: No. 16
- Record: 7–4 (3–1 AAWU)
- Head coach: Bill Barnes (4th season)
- Captain: Ron Hull
- Home stadium: Los Angeles Memorial Coliseum

1961 Athletic Association of Western Universities football standings
| | Conf. | | | | | Overall |
| Team | W | | L | | T | W | | L | | T |
|---|---|---|---|---|---|---|---|---|---|---|
| No. 16 UCLA $ | 3 | – | 1 | – | 0 | 7 | – | 4 | – | 0 |
| USC | 2 | – | 1 | – | 1 | 4 | – | 5 | – | 1 |
| Washington | 2 | – | 1 | – | 1 | 5 | – | 4 | – | 1 |
| Stanford | 1 | – | 3 | – | 0 | 4 | – | 6 | – | 0 |
| California | 1 | – | 3 | – | 0 | 1 | – | 8 | – | 1 |
$ – Conference champion; Rankings from AP poll

The 1961 UCLA Bruins football team was an American football team that represented the University of California, Los Angeles (UCLA) as a member of the Athletic Association of Western Universities (AAWU), commonly known at the time as the Big 5 Conference, during the 1961 college football season. In their fourth year under head coach Bill Barnes, the Bruins compiled a 7–4 record (3–1 in conference games), won the AAWU championship, outscored opponents by a total of 182 to 121, and were ranked No. 16 in the final Associated Press writers poll. They closed the season with a 21–3 loss to Minnesota in the 1962 Rose Bowl.

Ron Hull, who played at center on offense and linebacker on defense, was the team captain and a first-team All-American. The team's offensive leaders were Bobby Smith with 305 passing yards and 60 points scored; Mike Haffner with 696 rushing yards; and Kermit Alexander with 271 receiving yards.

The team played its home games at the Los Angeles Memorial Coliseum in Los Angeles.

== Schedule ==
| Date | Opponent | Rank | Site | Result | Attendance | Source |
|---|---|---|---|---|---|---|
| September 23 | at Air Force* | | DU Stadium; Denver, CO | W 19–6 | 27,500 | |
| September 30 | at Michigan* | No. 9 | Michigan Stadium; Ann Arbor, MI | L 6–29 | 73,019 | |
| October 7 | at No. 8 Ohio State* | | Ohio Stadium; Columbus, OH | L 3–13 | 82,992 | |
| October 14 | Vanderbilt* | | Los Angeles Memorial Coliseum; Los Angeles, CA | W 28–21 | 23,704 | |
| October 21 | Pittsburgh* | | Los Angeles Memorial Coliseum; Los Angeles, CA | W 20–6 | 27,688 | |
| October 28 | at Stanford | | Stanford Stadium; Stanford, CA | W 20–0 | 35,000 | |
| November 4 | California | | Los Angeles Memorial Coliseum; Los Angeles, CA (rivalry) | W 35–15 | 33,792 | |
| November 10 | TCU* | | Los Angeles Memorial Coliseum; Los Angeles, CA | W 28–7 | 29,236 | |
| November 18 | Washington | | Los Angeles Memorial Coliseum; Los Angeles, CA | L 13–17 | 33,969 | |
| November 25 | at USC | | Los Angeles Memorial Coliseum; Los Angeles, CA (Victory Bell) | W 10–7 | 57,580 | |
| January 1 | vs. No. 6 Minnesota* | No. 16 | Rose Bowl; Pasadena, CA (Rose Bowl) | L 3–21 | 98,214 | |
*Non-conference game; Rankings from AP Poll released prior to the game; Source:

== Awards ==
Ron Hull was on the field for 350 of 600 minutes during the 1961 regular season, playing at center on offense and at linebacker on defense. He was selected by the Football Writers Association of America (for Look magazine) as the first-team center on the 1961 All-America team. Hull also received second-team All-America honors from the Associated Press (AP).

At the end of the season, the AP released a 1961 All-Pacific Coast football team, and the AAWU released its own all-conference list limited to AAWU teams. Nine UCLA players received honors one or both: Hull (AP-1, AAWU-1); halfback Bobby Smith (AP-1, AAWU-1); quarterback/halfback Mike Haffner (AP-2, AAWU-2); tackle Foster Andersen (AP-2, AAWU-2); end Kermit Alexander (AAWU-2); end Don Vena (AAWU-2); guard Frank Macri (AAWU-2); guard Tom Paton (AAWU-2); and tackle Marshall Shirk (AAWU-2).

== Statistics ==
The Bruins gained an average of 218.5 rushing yards and 68 passing yards per game and scored an average of 16.5 points a game. On defense, the team held opponents to 144.2 rushing yards and 78.9 passing yards and 11.0 points per game.

The team's individual statistical leaders were:

- Rushing - Mike Haffner (696 yards, 107 carries), Bobby Smith (631 yards, 166 carries), Almose Thompson (370 yards, 93 carries), and Kermit Alexander (165 yards, 30 carries).
- Passing - Bobby Smith (16 of 33, 305 yards, one touchdown, three interceptions) and Mike Haffner (14 of 34, 231 yards, one touchdown, two interceptions).
- Receiving - Kermit Alexander (11 receptions, 271 yards) and Don Vena (nine receptions, 103 yards).
- Scoring - Bobby Smith (60 points) and Mike Haffner (48 points).

== Personnel ==
=== Roster ===
- Kermit Alexander, right halfback, 187 pounds, No. 33
- Dick Allen, guard
- Foster Andersen, tackle, 235 pounds, No. 74
- Joe Bauwens, guard/tackle
- Steve Bauwens, tackle
- Jim Bergman, quarterback
- Walt Dathe, guard
- Mitch Dimkich, fullback
- Carmen DiPoalo, halfback
- Tony Fiorentino, tackle
- Al Geverink, end
- Mel Gibbs, end
- Tom Gutman, right end, No. 80
- Mike Haffner, left halfback, sophomore, No. 11
- Bill Hauck, right halfback
- Gale Hickman, end
- Chuck Hicks, right end, 191 pounds, No. 88
- Ron Hull, center and captain, 205 pounds, No. 50
- Keith Jensen, halfback
- Bob Jones, tackle
- John LoCurto, quarterback
- Frank Macari, guard, 235 pounds, No. 43
- Phil Oram, tackle, 221 pounds, No. 77
- Tom Paton, guard, 215 pounds, No. 68
- Mel Profit, defensive end, No. 84
- Herb Quincy, guard
- Joe Rosenkrans, halfback
- Gary Scrivens, center
- Marshall Shirk, tackle
- Ezell Singleton, halfback, No. 20
- Bob Smith, right halfback
- Bobby Smith, left halfback, 193 pounds, No. 19
- Bob Stevens, quarterback, 194 pounds, No. 41
- Dave Stout, guard
- Almose Thompson, fullback, 198 pounds, No. 24
- Steve Truesdell, center
- Don Vena, left end, 205 pounds, No. 82
- Andy Von Sonn, center
- John Walker, quarterback
- Bob Weeden, tackle/edn
- Joe Zeno, fullback, No. 28

=== Coaching staff ===
- Bill Barnes, head coach, fourth year
- Deke Brackett, senior assistant coach
- Bob Bergdahl, assistant coach
- Sam Boghosian, assistant coach (line)
- Jim Dawson, assistant coach
- Johnny Johnson, assistant coach
- Dan Peterson, assistant coach
