= 1961 California Golden Bears football team =

American college football season

1961 California Golden Bears football
- Conference: Athletic Association of Western Universities
- Record: 1–8–1 (1–3 AAWU)
- Head coach: Marv Levy (2nd season)
- Home stadium: California Memorial Stadium

1961 Athletic Association of Western Universities football standings
	Conf.					Overall
Team	W		L		T	W		L		T
No. 16 UCLA $	3	–	1	–	0	7	–	4	–	0
USC	2	–	1	–	1	4	–	5	–	1
Washington	2	–	1	–	1	5	–	4	–	1
Stanford	1	–	3	–	0	4	–	6	–	0
California	1	–	3	–	0	1	–	8	–	1
$ – Conference champion; Rankings from AP poll

The 1961 California Golden Bears football team was an American football team that represented the University of California, Berkeley in the Athletic Association of Western Universities (AAWU), commonly known at the time as the Big 5 Conference, during the 1961 college football season. In their second year under head coach Marv Levy, the Bears compiled a 1–8–1 record (1–3 in conference games), finished in a tie for last place in the AAWU, and was outscored by their opponents by a total of 268 to 118.

The team's statistical leaders included Randy Gold with 403 passing yards, Alan Nelson with 331 rushing yards, and Bob Wills with 302 receiving yards.

The team played its home games at California Memorial Stadium in Berkeley, California.

== Schedule ==
Date	Opponent	Site	Result	Attendance	Source
September 23	No. 4 Texas*	California Memorial Stadium; Berkeley, CA	L 3–28	41,500	
September 30	at No. 1 Iowa*	Iowa Stadium; Iowa City, IA	L 7–28	56,000	
October 7	at Missouri*	Memorial Stadium; Columbia, MO	T 14–14	42,000	
October 14	Washington	California Memorial Stadium; Berkeley, CA	W 21–14	35,000–43,000	
October 21	USC	California Memorial Stadium; Berkeley, CA	L 14–28	38,000	
October 28	at Penn State*	Beaver Stadium; University Park, PA	L 16–33	30,265	
November 4	at UCLA	Los Angeles Memorial Coliseum; Los Angeles, CA (rivalry)	L 15–35	33,792	
November 11	Air Force*	California Memorial Stadium; Berkeley, CA	L 14–15	38,000	
November 18	Kansas*	California Memorial Stadium; Berkeley, CA	L 7–53	30,000	
November 25	at Stanford	Stanford Stadium; Stanford, CA (Big Game)	L 7–20	79,000	
*Non-conference game; Rankings from AP Poll released prior to the game

== Statistics ==
The team gained an average of 135.3 rushing yards and 49.0 passing yards per game. On defense, the Bears gave up an average of 282.4 rushing yards and 82.8 passing yards per game.

The team's passing leaders were Randy Gold (41-for-81, 403 yards, four touchdowns, three interceptions) and Larry Balliett (26-for-49, 367 yards, one touchdown, no interceptions).

The team had four players who rushed for over 200 yards: Alan Nelson (331 yards, 59 carries, 5.6-yard average); Rudy Carvajal (257 yards, 41 carries, 6.3-yard average); George Pierovich (238 yards, 80 carries, 3.0-yard average); and Jerry Scattini (206 yards, 64 carries, 3.2-yard average).

Bob Willis led the team in receiving with 21 receptions for 302 years.

== Awards and honors ==
Quarterback Larry Balliett was selected as the team's most valuable player.

Two California players received honors on the 1961 All-Pacific Coast football team selected by the Associated Press (AP), the All-West Coast team selected by the United Press International (UPI), or the All-Big 5 team announced by the AAWU. Guard Roger Stull received second-team honors from the UPI, and fullback George Pierovich received second-team honors from the AAWU, third-team honors from the UPI, and honorable mention from the AP. In addition, three other players received honorable mention: John Erby at guard (AP, AAWU); Randy Gold at back (AAWU); and Larry Balliet at back (AP).

== Personnel ==
=== Players ===
- Larry Balliett (#3), quarterback, 177 pounds
- Lauren Bock (#77), tackle, 212 pounds
- Tom Burke (#62), guard, 195 pounds
- Jim Burress (#44), captain and halfback, 178 pounds
- Rudy Carvajal (#41), halfback, 175 pounds
- John Erby (#65), guard, 190 pounds
- Dave Farro (#50), center, 200 pounds
- Randy Gold (#2), quarterback, 195 pounds
- Larry Lowell (#73), tackle, 213 pounds
- Jon Mason (#43), halfback, 185 pounds
- Norm McLean (#76), tackle, 215 pounds
- Dave Muga (#84), end, 205 pounds
- Alan Nelson (#24), halfback
- Stan Parkinson (#55), center, 198 pounds
- George Pierovich (#35), fullback, 215 pounds
- Mel Piestrup (#79), tackle, 205 pounds
- Jerry Scattini (#21), halfback, 195 pounds
- Andy Segale (#70), tackle, 210 pounds
- Roger Stull (#61), guard, 215 pounds
- Bill Turner (#86), end, 205 pounds
- Ron Vaughn (#88), end, 204 pounds
- Bob Wills (#81), end, 187 pounds

=== Coaches ===
- Head coach: Marv Levy
- Assistant coaches:
