= Andy Von Sonn =

American football player (1940–2015)

- Von Sonn, circa 1962

No. 46, 51
- Position: Linebacker

Personal information
- Born: November 5, 1940; Los Angeles, California, U.S.
- Died: October 9, 2015 (aged 74); Maui, Hawaii, U.S.
- Listed height: 6 ft 2 in (1.88 m)
- Listed weight: 229 lb (104 kg)

Career information
- High school: Reseda (Los Angeles)
- College: UCLA
- NFL draft: 1962: 14th round, 189th overall pick

Career history
- Chicago Bears (1963)*; Los Angeles Rams (1963–1964); Huntsville Rockets (1965); Atlanta Falcons (1966)*; Hartford Charter Oaks (1966)
- * Offseason or practice squad member only
- Stats at Pro Football Reference

Andrew Vsevolod Von Sonn (November 5, 1940 – October 9, 2015) was an American professional football linebacker who played for the Los Angeles Rams of the National Football League (NFL). He played college football for the UCLA Bruins and was selected by the Chicago Bears in the 14th round of the 1962 NFL draft.

== Early life ==
Andrew Vsevolod Von Sonn was born on November 5, 1940, in Los Angeles, California. He attended Reseda High School in Los Angeles.

== College career ==
Von Sonn enrolled at the University of California, Los Angeles to play college football for the Bruins. He was on the freshman team in 1958. In 1959, he competed for a tackle spot on the varsity team but did not end up earning a letter. Von Sonn was a three-year lettermen from 1960 to 1962 as a center on offense and a linebacker on defense. He became the starting center in 1962 after Ron Hull graduated. Von Sonn was captain of the 1962 Bruins and earned first-team All-Athletic Association of Western Universities honors. At the conclusion of his college career, he played in the 1963 Hula Bowl.

== Professional career ==
In December 1961, Von Sonn was selected by the Chicago Bears in the 14th round, with the 189th overall pick, of the 1962 NFL draft and by the Denver Broncos in the 27th round, with the 210th overall pick, of the 1962 AFL draft. He signed with the Bears on May 5, 1963. He was waived before the start of regular season.

On September 9, 1963, Von Sonn was claimed off waivers by the Los Angeles Rams and placed on the team's taxi squad, where he spent the entire 1963 season. He played in all 14 games, starting five, for the Rams in 1964 and posted one sack. He was released on August 31, 1965, after the third (of five) preseason games.

Von Sonn played for the Huntsville Rockets of the North American Football League in 1965. On September 22, 1965, he signed with the Atlanta Falcons for the team's inaugural 1966 season. He was released on August 11, 1966, after the second (of five) preseason games. Von Sonn finished his pro football career with the Hartford Charter Oaks of the Continental Football League in 1966.

== Personal life ==
Von Sonn graduated from the UCLA School of Law in 1970. He wrote a comic book called Cops 'N Dopers. He was a medical marijuana advocate. Von Sonn died on October 9, 2015, in Maui.
