= 1961 Stanford Indians football team =

American college football season

1961 Stanford Indians football
- Conference: Athletic Association of Western Universities
- Record: 4–6 (1–4 AAWU)
- Head coach: Jack Curtice (4th season)
- Home stadium: Stanford Stadium

1961 Athletic Association of Western Universities football standings
	Conf.					Overall
Team	W		L		T	W		L		T
No. 16 UCLA $	3	–	1	–	0	7	–	4	–	0
USC	2	–	1	–	1	4	–	5	–	1
Washington	2	–	1	–	1	5	–	4	–	1
Stanford	1	–	3	–	0	4	–	6	–	0
California	1	–	3	–	0	1	–	8	–	1
$ – Conference champion; Rankings from AP poll

The 1961 Stanford Indians football team was an American football team that represented Stanford University as a member of the Athletic Association of Western Universities (AAWU), commonly known at the time as the Big 5 Conference, during the 1961 college football season. In their fourth year under head coach Jack Curtice, the Indians compiled a 4–6 record (1–4 in conference games), finished in a tie for last place in the AAWU, and were outscored by a total of 163 to 105.

Highlights of the season included a 34–0 victory over Tommy Prothro's Oregon State Beavers and a 20–7 victory over the California Bears in the Big Game – Stanford's first victory over Cal since 1957.

The team played home games at Stanford Stadium in Stanford, California.

== Schedule ==
Date	Opponent	Site	Result	Attendance	Source
September 23	Tulane*	Stanford Stadium; Stanford, CA	W 9–7	19,000	
September 30	at Oregon State	Parker Stadium; Corvallis, OR	W 34–0	13,727	
October 7	at No. 6 Michigan State*	Spartan Stadium; East Lansing, MI	L 3–31	61,367	
October 14	San Jose State*	Stanford Stadium; Stanford, CA (rivalry)	W 17–6	45,000	
October 21	at Washington	Husky Stadium; Seattle, WA	L 0–13	53,200	
October 28	UCLA^{†}	Stanford Stadium; Stanford, CA	L 0–20	35,000	
November 4	Oregon*	Stanford Stadium; Stanford, CA	L 7–19	27,000	
November 11	at USC	Los Angeles Memorial Coliseum; Los Angeles, CA (rivalry)	L 15–30	36,598	
November 18	Washington State*	Stanford Stadium; Stanford, CA	L 0–30	21,000	
November 25	California	Stanford Stadium; Stanford, CA (Big Game)	W 20–7	79,000	
*Non-conference game; ^{†}Homecoming; Rankings from AP Poll released prior to the game

== Statistics ==
The 1961 Stanford team gained an average of 147.6 rushing yards and 90.1 passing yards per game. On defense, the team gave up 214.6 rushing yards and 77.0 passing guards per game.

The team had seven players who gained over 100 rushing yards but none who gained more than 200 yards. The leaders were Ken Babajian (189 yards, 55 carries, 3.4-yard average), Gary Craig (185 yards, 50 carries, 3.7-yard average), Stan Lindskog (178 yards, 42 carries, 4.2-yard average), and Danny Spence (134 yards, 28 carries, 4.8-yard average).

The team had four players who passed for over 100 yards: Rod Sears (37-for-82, 358 yards), Chuck Butler (21-for-46, 258 yards), Steve Turlow (15-for 34, 174 yards), and Jim Smith (12-for-21, 111 yards).

The leading receivers were George Honore (22 receptions for 225 yards), Steve Pursell (13 receptions for 132 yards), and Larry Royse (five receptions for 112 yards).

== Awards and honors ==
Ed Cummings, who played fullback on offense and linebacker on defense, was selected as the team's most valuable player.

No Stanford players received All-America honors.

Three Stanford players received honors on the 1961 All-Pacific Coast football team selected by the Associated Press (AP), the All-West Coast team selected by the United Press International (UPI), or the All-Big 5 team announced by the AAWU.

- End George Honore received first-team honors on the official Big 5 all-conference team and third-team honors on the UPI's All-West Coast team.
- Guard Tom Walsh received second-team honors on the All-Pacific Coast team selected by the AP.
- Fullback/linebacker Ed Cummings received second-team honors from the UPI and the AAWU and honorable mention from the AP.

Players receiving honorable mention were center John Butler (AP, AAWU); end Frank Patitucci (UPI, AAWU); tackle Al Heldebrand (AAWU); tackle C. B. Simons (AAWU); center Chris Cottle (UPI, AAWU); and halfback Gary Sargent (AAWU).

== Roster ==
- Frank Atkinson (#79), tackle
- Ken Babajian (#44), fullback, sophomore
- Mike Barnes (#29), halfback
- Chuck Buehler (#78), tackle
- Chuck Butler (#12), quarterback
- John Butler (#69), end
- Chris Cottle (#54), center
- Gary Craig (#40), halfback
- Ed Cummings (#46), fullback/linebacker
- Frank Dubofsky (#64), guard
- Al Heldebrand (#75), tackle
- George Honore (#83), end
- Stan Lindskog (#21), halfback/kicker, junior
- Frank Patitucci (#82), end
- Steve Pursell (#80), end
- Larry Royse, halfback/linebacker
- Gary Sargent (#34), halfback
- Errol Scott (#66), guard
- Rod Sears (#10), quarterback
- C.B. Simons (#71), tackle
- Danny Spence (#30), halfback
- Hal Steuber (#36), fullback
- Steve Thurlow (#18), quarterback
- Randy Vahan (#76), tackle
- Tom Walsh (#63), guard
