= 1961 UC Riverside Highlanders football team =

American college football season

1961 UC Riverside Highlanders football
- Conference: Independent
- Record: 1–7
- Head coach: Jim Whitley (3rd season)
- Home stadium: UCR Athletic Field

1961 Western college football independents records
	Conf.			Overall
Team	W	L	T	W		L		T
No. 17 Arizona		–		8	–	1	–	1
Westminster (UT)		–		7	–	1	–	1
La Verne		–		7	–	2	–	0
Idaho State		–		5	–	2	–	1
San Francisco		–		4	–	2	–	0
Cal Poly Pomona		–		6	–	3	–	0
San Jose State		–		6	–	4	–	0
Eastern New Mexico		–		6	–	4	–	0
Los Angeles Pacific		–		5	–	3	–	0
Montana State		–		4	–	3	–	1
Pacific (CA)		–		5	–	4	–	0
Azusa		–		4	–	3	–	0
Oregon State		–		5	–	5	–	0
Santa Clara		–		3	–	3	–	0
Oregon		–		4	–	6	–	0
Claremont		–		3	–	6	–	0
Air Force		–		3	–	7	–	0
Washington State		–		3	–	7	–	0
Cal Western		–		3	–	7	–	0
Idaho		–		2	–	7	–	0
San Diego		–		2	–	8	–	0
Southern California College		–		1	–	5	–	0
UC Riverside		–		1	–	7	–	0
Pepperdine		–		1	–	9	–	0

The 1961 UC Riverside Highlanders football team represented the University of California, Riverside as an independent during the 1961 college football season. Led by third-year head coach Jim Whitley, UC Riverside compiled a record of 1–7. The team was outscored by its opponents 159 to 101 for the season. The Highlanders played home games at UCR Athletic Field in Riverside, California.

== Schedule ==
Date	Opponent	Site	Result	Attendance	Source
September 23	Azusa (Note: Azusa College existed from 1956 to 1964. It merged with Los Angeles Pacific College in 1965 to become Azusa Pacific University. Azusa Pacific's official football records do not include the history from either of the predecessor schools.)	UCR Athletic Field; Riverside, CA	L 6–22	900	
October 7	at UC Davis	Aggie Field; Davis, CA	L 12–40	1,600–3,300	
October 14	at La Verne	Bonita High School ?; La Verne, CA	L 6–8	1,300	
October 21	at Claremont-Mudd	Fritz B. Burns Stadium; Claremont, CA	L 14–21		
October 28	Pomona	UCR Athletic Field; Riverside, CA	L 8–32		
November 4	at Caltech	Rose Bowl; Pasadena, CA	W 43–8		
November 11	El Toro Marines (Note: Marine Corps Air Station El Toro was a U.S. Marine air station located in Orange County, California from 1943 to 1999.)	UCR Athletic Field; Riverside, CA	L 12–18		
November 18	Cal Western	UCR Athletic Field; Riverside, CA	L 0–10		
