= 1961 Pacific Tigers football team =

American college football season

1961 Pacific Tigers football
- Conference: Independent
- Record: 5–4
- Head coach: John Rohde (1st season)
- Home stadium: Pacific Memorial Stadium

1961 Western college football independents records
	Conf.			Overall
Team	W	L	T	W		L		T
No. 17 Arizona		–		8	–	1	–	1
Westminster (UT)		–		7	–	1	–	1
La Verne		–		7	–	2	–	0
Idaho State		–		5	–	2	–	1
San Francisco		–		4	–	2	–	0
Cal Poly Pomona		–		6	–	3	–	0
San Jose State		–		6	–	4	–	0
Eastern New Mexico		–		6	–	4	–	0
Los Angeles Pacific		–		5	–	3	–	0
Montana State		–		4	–	3	–	1
Pacific (CA)		–		5	–	4	–	0
Azusa		–		4	–	3	–	0
Oregon State		–		5	–	5	–	0
Santa Clara		–		3	–	3	–	0
Oregon		–		4	–	6	–	0
Claremont		–		3	–	6	–	0
Air Force		–		3	–	7	–	0
Washington State		–		3	–	7	–	0
Cal Western		–		3	–	7	–	0
Idaho		–		2	–	7	–	0
San Diego		–		2	–	8	–	0
Southern California College		–		1	–	5	–	0
UC Riverside		–		1	–	7	–	0
Pepperdine		–		1	–	9	–	0

The 1961 Pacific Tigers football team represented the College of the Pacific (COP)—now known as the University of the Pacific (UOP)—as an independent during the 1961 college football season. Led by first-year head coach John Rohde, the Tigers compiled a record of 5–4 and outscored opponents 200 to 187. The team played home games at Pacific Memorial Stadium in Stockton, California.

== Schedule ==
Date	Opponent	Site	Result	Attendance	Source
September 16	Long Beach State	Pacific Memorial Stadium; Stockton, CA	W 12–7	6,500	
September 22	at San Jose State	Spartan Stadium; San Jose, CA (Victory Bell)	L 0–16	17,000	
September 29	at San Diego	Torero Stadium; San Diego, CA	W 40–7		
October 7	Fresno State	Pacific Memorial Stadium; Stockton, CA	L 19–20	10,000	
October 14	New Mexico State	Memorial Stadium (Note: This stadium is the predecessor to the current Memorial Stadium on the New Mexico State campus, which was opened for the 1978 season); Las Cruces, MN	L 19–70	8,200	
October 21	San Diego Marines (Note: The Marine Corps Recruit Depot (MCRD) in San Diego fielded a team that played against colleges and other military teams from 1922 to 1964.)	Pacific Memorial Stadium; Stockton, CA	W 12–9	5,000	
October 28	Los Angeles State	Pacific Memorial Stadium; Stockton, CA	W 45–27		
November 4	at Idaho	Neale Stadium; Moscow, ID	W 27–2	5,800	
November 11	San Jose State	Pacific Memorial Stadium; Stockton, CA	L 26–29		

== Team players in the NFL ==
No College of the Pacific players were selected in the 1962 NFL draft.

The following finished their college career at Pacific, were not drafted, but played in the NFL starting with the 1962 season.

Player	Position	First AFL team
Bobby Reed	Halfback	1962 Minnesota Vikings
