= 1961 La Verne Leopards football team =

American college football season

1961 La Verne Leopards football
- Conference: Independent
- Record: 7–2
- Head coach: Roland Ortmayer (14th season)

1961 Western college football independents records
	Conf.			Overall
Team	W	L	T	W		L		T
No. 17 Arizona		–		8	–	1	–	1
Westminster (UT)		–		7	–	1	–	1
La Verne		–		7	–	2	–	0
Idaho State		–		5	–	2	–	1
San Francisco		–		4	–	2	–	0
Cal Poly Pomona		–		6	–	3	–	0
San Jose State		–		6	–	4	–	0
Eastern New Mexico		–		6	–	4	–	0
Los Angeles Pacific		–		5	–	3	–	0
Montana State		–		4	–	3	–	1
Pacific (CA)		–		5	–	4	–	0
Azusa		–		4	–	3	–	0
Oregon State		–		5	–	5	–	0
Santa Clara		–		3	–	3	–	0
Oregon		–		4	–	6	–	0
Claremont		–		3	–	6	–	0
Air Force		–		3	–	7	–	0
Washington State		–		3	–	7	–	0
Cal Western		–		3	–	7	–	0
Idaho		–		2	–	7	–	0
San Diego		–		2	–	8	–	0
Southern California College		–		1	–	5	–	0
UC Riverside		–		1	–	7	–	0
Pepperdine		–		1	–	9	–	0

The 1961 La Verne Leopards football team was an American football team that represented the University of La Verne of La Verne, California as an independent during the 1961 college football season. In their 14th season under head coach Roland Ortmayer, the Leopards compiled a 7–2 record.

== Schedule ==
Date	Opponent	Site	Result	Attendance	Source
September 23	at Pomona	Alumni Field; Pomona, CA	W 37–28		
September 30	at Claremont-Mudd	Claremont, CA	W 28–12		
October 7	Cal Western^{†}	La Verne, CA	W 35–0		
October 14	UC Riverside	La Verne, CA	W 8–6		
October 21	at Caltech	Caltech Field; Pasadena, CA	W 29–0		
October 28	Westminster (UT)	Dane Hansen Field; Salt Lake City, UT	L 13–25		
November 4	at Azusa	Azusa High field; Azusa, CA	W 46–20		
November 11	Redlands	U.R. stadium; Claremont, CA	L 28–40	4,000	
November 18	vs. Los Angeles Pacific	Rose Bowl; Pasadena, CA	W 35–8		
^{†}Homecoming
