= 1961 Idaho State Bengals football team =

American college football season

1961 Idaho State Bengals football
- Conference: Independent
- Record: 5–2–1
- Head coach: Babe Caccia (10th season)
- Home stadium: Spud Bowl

1961 Western college football independents records
	Conf.			Overall
Team	W	L	T	W		L		T
No. 17 Arizona		–		8	–	1	–	1
Westminster (UT)		–		7	–	1	–	1
La Verne		–		7	–	2	–	0
Idaho State		–		5	–	2	–	1
San Francisco		–		4	–	2	–	0
Cal Poly Pomona		–		6	–	3	–	0
San Jose State		–		6	–	4	–	0
Eastern New Mexico		–		6	–	4	–	0
Los Angeles Pacific		–		5	–	3	–	0
Montana State		–		4	–	3	–	1
Pacific (CA)		–		5	–	4	–	0
Azusa		–		4	–	3	–	0
Oregon State		–		5	–	5	–	0
Santa Clara		–		3	–	3	–	0
Oregon		–		4	–	6	–	0
Claremont		–		3	–	6	–	0
Air Force		–		3	–	7	–	0
Washington State		–		3	–	7	–	0
Cal Western		–		3	–	7	–	0
Idaho		–		2	–	7	–	0
San Diego		–		2	–	8	–	0
Southern California College		–		1	–	5	–	0
UC Riverside		–		1	–	7	–	0
Pepperdine		–		1	–	9	–	0

The 1961 Idaho State Bengals football team was an American football team that represented Idaho State College (now known as Idaho State University) as an independent during the 1961 college football season. The Bengals compiled a 5–2–1 record.

Babe Caccia was in his tenth year as the team's head coach. Caccia led the team to five Rocky Mountain Conference (RMC) championships before the team became an independent in 1961. The team's assistant coaches were Leo McKillip (backfield) and Dean Thomas (end).

== Schedule ==
Date	Opponent	Site	Result	Attendance	Source
September 16	Hamilton AFB	Spud Bowl; Pocatello, ID	T 12–12		
September 23	Colorado Mines	Spud Bowl; Pocatello, ID	W 50–6	3,000	
September 30	Western State (CO)	Spud Bowl; Pocatello, ID	W 22–10	3,500	
October 7	at Arizona State–Flagstaff	Lumberjack Stadium; Flagstaff, AZ	W 27–0	4,500	
October 14	at Drake	Drake Stadium; Des Moines, IA	W 12–11	5,000	
October 28	Montana State^{†}	Spud Bowl; Pocatello, ID	W 14–12	2,000	
November 4	at Colorado State–Greeley	Jackson Field; Greeley, CO	L 22–27		
November 18	at San Diego Marines	Hall Field; San Diego, CA	L 6–28		
^{†}Homecoming
