= 1961 Cal Poly Pomona Broncos football team =

American college football season

1961 Cal Poly Pomona Broncos football
- Conference: Independent
- Record: 6–3
- Head coach: Don Warhurst (5th season)
- Home stadium: L.A. State Stadium

1961 Western college football independents records
	Conf.			Overall
Team	W	L	T	W		L		T
No. 17 Arizona		–		8	–	1	–	1
Westminster (UT)		–		7	–	1	–	1
La Verne		–		7	–	2	–	0
Idaho State		–		5	–	2	–	1
San Francisco		–		4	–	2	–	0
Cal Poly Pomona		–		6	–	3	–	0
San Jose State		–		6	–	4	–	0
Eastern New Mexico		–		6	–	4	–	0
Los Angeles Pacific		–		5	–	3	–	0
Montana State		–		4	–	3	–	1
Pacific (CA)		–		5	–	4	–	0
Azusa		–		4	–	3	–	0
Oregon State		–		5	–	5	–	0
Santa Clara		–		3	–	3	–	0
Oregon		–		4	–	6	–	0
Claremont		–		3	–	6	–	0
Air Force		–		3	–	7	–	0
Washington State		–		3	–	7	–	0
Cal Western		–		3	–	7	–	0
Idaho		–		2	–	7	–	0
San Diego		–		2	–	8	–	0
Southern California College		–		1	–	5	–	0
UC Riverside		–		1	–	7	–	0
Pepperdine		–		1	–	9	–	0

The 1961 Cal Poly Pomona Broncos football team represented the Cal Poly Kellogg-Voorhis Unit—now known as California State Polytechnic University, Pomona—as an independent during the 1961 college football season. Led by fifth-year head coach Don Warhurst, Cal Poly Pomona compiled a record of 6–3. The team outscored its opponents 258 to 147 for the season. The Broncos played home games at L.A. State Stadium in Los Angeles.

== Schedule ==
Date	Time	Opponent	Site	Result	Attendance	Source
September 16		at Los Angeles State	East Los Angeles College Stadium; Monterey Park, CA	W 21–11	5,200	
September 22	8:00 p.m.	Sacramento State	L.A. State Stadium; Los Angeles, CA	W 27–12	1,500	
September 30		San Francisco State	L.A. State Stadium; Los Angeles, CA	L 19–26	3,000–4,200	
October 7		at Redlands	Redlands Stadium (Note: This stadium is the predecessor to the current Ted Runner Stadium on the University of Redlands campus, which was opened for the 1968 season); Redlands, CA	W 35–14	5,200	
October 14		at San Diego Marines (Note: The Marine Corps Recruit Depot (MCRD) in San Diego fielded a team that played against colleges and other military teams from 1922 to 1964.)	Balboa Stadium?; San Diego, CA	L 14–28	3,100	
October 21		Pepperdine^{†}	L.A. State Stadium; Los Angeles, CA	W 26–14	2,500	
October 28		at Nevada	Mackay Stadium (Note: This stadium is the predecessor to the current Mackay Stadium, which was opened for the 1966 season.); Reno, NV	L 20–28	4,500–4,600	
November 4		at Arizona State–Flagstaff	Lumberjack Stadium; Flagstaff, AZ	W 55–12	2,500	
November 11		San Diego	L.A. State Stadium; Los Angeles, CA	W 41–2	2,300	
^{†}Homecoming; All times are in Pacific time
