= 1961 All-Pacific Coast football team =

American all-star college football team

The 1961 All-Pacific Coast football team consists of American football players chosen by various organizations for All-Pacific Coast teams for the 1961 college football season.

== Selections ==
=== Quarterbacks ===
- Terry Baker, Oregon State (AP-1)
- Pete Beathard, USC (BIG5-1)
- Chon Gallegos, San Jose State (AP-2)

=== Halfbacks ===
- Charles H. Mitchell, Washington (AP-1; BIG5-1)
- Bobby Smith, UCLA (AP-1; BIG5-1)
- Mike Haffner, UCLA (AP-2)
- Jim Stiger, Washington (AP-2)

=== Fullbacks ===
- Ben Wilson, USC (AP-1; BIG5-1)
- George Reed, Washington State (AP-2)

=== Ends ===
- Hugh Campbell, Washington State (AP-1)
- Oscar Donahue, San Jose State (AP-1)
- Hal Bedsole, USC (AP-2; BIG5-1)
- George Honore, Stanford (BIG5-1)
- Reg Carolan, Idaho (AP-2)
- Roger Johnson, Oregon State (AP-2)

=== Tackles ===
- John Meyers, Washington (AP-1; BIG5-1)
- Steve Barnett, Oregon (AP-1)
- Frank Buncom, USC (AP-2; BIG5-1)
- Foster Andersen, UCLA (AP-2)

=== Guards ===
- Britt Williams, USC (AP-1; BIG5-1)
- Mickey Ording, Oregon (AP-1)
- Jim Skaggs, Washington (AP-2; BIG5-1)
- Tom Walsh, Stanford (AP-2)

=== Centers ===
- Ron Hull, UCLA (AP-1; BIG5-1)
- Ray Mansfield, Washington (AP-2)

== Key ==
AP = Associated Press

BIG5 = all-conference team announced by the league

Bold = Consensus first-team selection of both the UP and the Big 5 Conference

== See also ==
- 1961 College Football All-America Team
