= Jim Skaggs =

American football player (born 1940)

No. 70
- Positions: Guard, Tackle

Personal information
- Born: January 3, 1940 (age 86); Wetumka, Oklahoma, U.S.
- Listed height: 6 ft 3 in (1.91 m)
- Listed weight: 250 lb (113 kg)

Career information
- High school: Arroyo Grande (Arroyo Grande, California)
- College: Washington (1958-1961)
- NFL draft: 1962: 10th round, 139th overall pick
- AFL draft: 1962: 12th round, 89th overall pick

Career history
- Philadelphia Eagles (1963–1972)

Awards and highlights
- First-team All-PCC (1961)

Career NFL statistics
- Games played: 100
- Games started: 83
- Fumble recoveries: 4
- Stats at Pro Football Reference

James Lee Skaggs (born January 3, 1940) is an American former professional football player who played as an offensive lineman nine seasons with the Philadelphia Eagles of the National Football League (NFL). He played college football for the Washington Huskies and was honored for his play as a guard during his senior season. Skaggs was selected to play in multiple college all-star games. The Eagles selected him in the 10th round of the 1962 NFL draft, and Skaggs was also selected in the 12th round of the 1962 AFL draft by the Oakland Raiders. Skaggs started 78 of the 100 regular season games he played in for the Eagles; while missing two full seasons and large parts of other seasons with leg injuries.

== Early life ==
Skaggs was born on January 3, 1940, in Wetumka, Oklahoma. He attended Arroyo Grande High School, in Arroyo Grande California; where he played four seasons of varsity football. He was an all-conference player in high school in 1956 and 1957, won the Leiter Trophy in 1957 at tackle as the school's outstanding lineman, and was named small school all-California Interscholastic Federation (CIF) as a senior. He was a team co-captain in 1957. Skaggs was also a member of the school's wrestling team. He graduated in 1958. He was inducted into the school’s Hall of Fame in 2012.

Two days after playing in the January 1, 1960 Rose Bowl, on his 20th birthday, Skaggs married Diane Yager in Arroyo Grande. The couple had been high school sweethearts in Arroyo Grande.

== College career ==
Skaggs attended the University of Washington, where he played on the Huskies football team as an offensive guard, end, and tackle. He played on the freshman team in 1958, and joined the varsity as a sophomore in 1959. Skaggs was listed to play as a guard going into his sophomore season, but started a few games at tackle that year. As a sophomore, he played for three quarters in the 1960 Rose Bowl, where the Huskies defeated Wisconsin, 44–8.

As a junior (1960), Skaggs began the season as the Huskies' right guard, but later started most of the regular season at offensive end. He reportedly played offensive end in the 1961 Rose Bowl, as a junior; the Huskies upsetting Minnesota 17–7. It is also reported that teammate John Meyers, whom Skaggs had replaced during the season, started over Skaggs at end in the Rose Bowl.

Skaggs was moved back to guard before the start of his senior season. Before Skaggs's senior season, New York Herald Tribune sports editor Stanley Woodward, describing Skaggs as a guard, stated that he was probably the Huskies' smartest player, one of its physically strongest, and "'a fast man down field'". As a senior, United Press International named Skaggs All-West Coast. In December 1961, the Athletic Association of Western Universities Big Five conference coaches selected him first-team all-conference at guard. The Associated Press named him second-team All-Pacific Coast at guard as a senior.

Skaggs was selected to play in the East West Shrine Game in 1961 at guard, and in the January 1962 Hula Bowl. He was also selected to play in the August 1962 Chicago Charities College All-Star Game against the Green Bay Packers. Skaggs suffered a broken ankle while in training camp for the College All-Star Game.

== Professional career ==
The Philadelphia Eagles selected Skaggs in the 10th round of the 1962 NFL draft, 139th overall. The Oakland Raiders selected Skaggs in the 12th round of the 1962 American Football League (AFL) draft, 89th overall. He considered the two-year old AFL an inferior league at that time, with questionable stability going into the future; and chose to sign a contract to play for the Eagles in mid-December 1961. He would go on to play nine seasons for the Eagles (missing the 1962 and 1968 seasons); starting 78 of the 100 regular season games in which he appeared for the Eagles. His career was significantly limited by leg injuries, including missing all of the 1962 and 1968 seasons, the majority of the 1963 season, and half of the 1969 season. During his Eagles' career, Skaggs played on the Eagles' offensive line through three distinct efforts to rebuild the team's offensive line unit.

After breaking his ankle during training for the August 1962 Chicago College All-Star Game, Skaggs spent significant time with a large cast on his leg and was physically unable to play in 1962. It is also reported that Skaggs spent the 1962 season on the Eagles' taxi squad. Skaggs participated in the 1963 Eagles' training camp. He was first used at linebacker, but was moved to guard. He started the second game of the 1963 season at right guard against the St. Louis Cardinals, but suffered a ruptured left knee ligament during the game that required surgery. He only appeared in three games for the Eagles in 1963.

Skaggs started three games at left offensive tackle in 1964. From 1965 to 1967 he started all 14 games each season at right guard for the Eagles. Skaggs suffered a significant knee injury against the Washington Redskins on December 3, 1967, limping off the field; but later returned to finish that game. Even though the injury would require surgery, he continued to play, starting the season's final two games against the Dallas Cowboys and Cleveland Browns. Skaggs was aware he needed knee surgery but chose to wait until the season ended, while continuing to play with an injured knee. Skaggs did not play in 1968 NFL season. He underwent knee surgery in January 1968, but continued to have cartilage issues going into the 1968 season.

In August 1969 Skaggs suffered torn right knee cartilage, requiring another surgery. There was concern expressed that Skaggs would miss most of the season. He did not play due to the knee injury that season until being reactivated by the Eagles at the end of October 1969. Skaggs played in the final seven games of the 1969 season, starting those games at right guard. The Eagles also reportedly waived Skaggs in September 1969, after his injury and before the start of the season.

Skaggs came back in 1970 to start all 14 Eagles' games at right guard. Skaggs reduced his weight from 250 lb (113 kg) to 235 lb (106.6 kg) in training camp, which offensive line coach Dick Stanfel believed was to Skaggs's benefit overall during the season. Skaggs considered this his best season.

In 1971, Skaggs appeared in 10 games; starting five at left guard. He suffered a tear of the medial collateral ligament in his left knee in training camp, when two Eagles' defensemen fell on him; and he was placed in a cast for four weeks. Skaggs was not activated until the third game of the 1971 season; though not as starter. He replaced rookie Henry Allison as a starter at left guard in the 10th game of the season.

Skaggs was placed on the injured waiver list before the start of the 1972 season. He appeared in 10 games that season, starting six at left guard. In an interview during the Eagles' July 1972 training camp, the last and most difficult of his NFL career, among other things Skaggs said "'I read the Bible. Of course I don't think I can get through (the camp) on faith. The Bible says hard times befall all men'". Skaggs retired from the NFL in April 1973.

== Personal life ==
Skaggs and his family lived in Renton, Washington during his career. He retired from the NFL after the 1972 season and went to work with State Farm Insurance for 29 years. He was an agent for three years before reaching management level positions, ultimately becoming an agency field executive; retiring in 2000. He and Diane (Yager) Skaggs made their home in Ellensburg, Washington. He owns a 33-acre hay farm in Central Washington that he leases.
