= Jim Stiger =

American football player (1941–1981)

No. 40, 26
- Position: Running back

Personal information
- Born: January 7, 1941; Carthio, Texas, U.S.
- Died: December 12, 1981 (aged 40); Lompoc, California, U.S.
- Listed height: 5 ft 11 in (1.80 m)
- Listed weight: 190 lb (86 kg)

Career information
- High school: Corcoran (CA)
- College: Washington
- NFL draft: 1963: 19th round, 258th overall pick

Career history
- Dallas Cowboys (1963–1965); Los Angeles Rams (1965–1967)

Awards and highlights
- Second-team All-AAWU (1961)

Career NFL statistics
- Rushing yards: 583
- Rushing average: 4.2
- Receptions: 31
- Receiving yards: 297
- Total touchdowns: 4
- Stats at Pro Football Reference

James Edward Stiger (January 7, 1941 – December 12, 1981) was an American professional football running back in the National Football League (NFL) for the Dallas Cowboys and Los Angeles Rams. He played college football at the University of Washington.

== Early life ==
Stiger attended Corcoran High School, before moving on to Bakersfield Junior College, where he helped his team reach the Little Rose Bowl. He transferred to the University of Washington after his sophomore season in 1961.

As a junior, he played as a fullback, registering 582 rushing yards, 4.5-yard average, 33 receiving yards and one receiving touchdown.

As a senior, he was switched to halfback behind Junior Coffey, posting as a backup 229 rushing yards, 4.8-yard average, 2 rushing touchdowns, 52 receiving yards and one receiving touchdown.

== Professional career ==
=== Dallas Cowboys ===
Stiger was selected by the Dallas Cowboys in the 19th round (258th overall) of the 1963 NFL draft. As a rookie, he was the starting fullback in 3 games, while leading the team in kickoff and punt returns, including a 45-yard punt return (at the time second longest in club history). He finished 10th in the league with 573 combined kickoff and punt return yards.

In 1964, he started 8 games at both fullback and halfback. He served mainly as a backup to Amos Marsh, until being waived on November 3, 1965, to make room for punter Colin Ridgway, the first Australian to play in the National Football League.

=== Los Angeles Rams ===
On November 6, 1965, he was signed by the Los Angeles Rams to help improve the return game. In 1966, he was the fourth leading punt returner in the NFL. He was released on September 17, 1968, after arriving out of shape to training camp.

== Personal life ==
On December 12, 1981, he died of a heart attack while playing racquetball.
