= Max Coley =

American football coach (1927–1994)

Personal information
- Born: October 5, 1927; Wewoka, Oklahoma
- Died: August 6, 1994 (aged 67); Eugene, Oregon

Career information
- High school: Tulsa (OK) Central
- College: Northeastern Oklahoma A&M, San Jose State

Career history
- San Jose State (1956-1958) Assistant; Oregon (1959-1968) Backfield coach; Pittsburgh Steelers (1969) Offensive ends coach; Pittsburgh Steelers (1970-1971) Offensive backfield coach; Denver Broncos (1972-1976) Offensive coordinator/offensive backfield coach; San Diego Chargers (1977) Offensive coordinator; Los Angeles Rams (1978) Backfield coach
- Coaching profile at Pro Football Reference

Max Belford Coley (October 5, 1927 - August 6, 1994) was an American football coach. He served as an assistant coach for the Pittsburgh Steelers, Denver Broncos, San Diego Chargers and Los Angeles Rams.

== Personal life ==
Coley's memorial service was held in Long Beach, California. He was the owner of CM Carpet in Palm Desert.
