= 1961 Oregon State Beavers football team =

American college football season

1961 Oregon State Beavers football
- Conference: Independent
- Record: 5–5
- Head coach: Tommy Prothro (7th season)
- Captain: Mike Kline
- Home stadium: Parker Stadium; Multnomah Stadium

1961 Western college football independents records
	Conf.			Overall
Team	W	L	T	W		L		T
No. 17 Arizona		–		8	–	1	–	1
Westminster (UT)		–		7	–	1	–	1
La Verne		–		7	–	2	–	0
Idaho State		–		5	–	2	–	1
San Francisco		–		4	–	2	–	0
Cal Poly Pomona		–		6	–	3	–	0
San Jose State		–		6	–	4	–	0
Eastern New Mexico		–		6	–	4	–	0
Los Angeles Pacific		–		5	–	3	–	0
Montana State		–		4	–	3	–	1
Pacific (CA)		–		5	–	4	–	0
Azusa		–		4	–	3	–	0
Oregon State		–		5	–	5	–	0
Santa Clara		–		3	–	3	–	0
Oregon		–		4	–	6	–	0
Claremont		–		3	–	6	–	0
Air Force		–		3	–	7	–	0
Washington State		–		3	–	7	–	0
Cal Western		–		3	–	7	–	0
Idaho		–		2	–	7	–	0
San Diego		–		2	–	8	–	0
Southern California College		–		1	–	5	–	0
UC Riverside		–		1	–	7	–	0
Pepperdine		–		1	–	9	–	0

The 1961 Oregon State Beavers football team represented Oregon State University as an independent during the 1961 college football season. Led by seventh-year head coach Tommy Prothro, the Beavers ended their third season as an independent with five wins and five losses, and outscored their opponents 198 to 192. Four home games were played on campus at Parker Stadium in Corvallis with one at Multnomah Stadium in Portland.

Prior to this season, the university's current title, Oregon State University, was adopted by a legislative act signed into law by Governor Mark Hatfield on March 6, 1961, and became effective in the summer.

== Schedule ==
Date	Opponent	Site	Result	Attendance	Source
September 23	No. 10 Syracuse	Multnomah Stadium; Portland, OR	L 8–19	35,729	
September 30	Stanford	Parker Stadium; Corvallis, OR	L 0–34	13,727	
October 7	Idaho	Parker Stadium; Corvallis, OR	W 44–6	9,329	
October 14	at Wisconsin	Camp Randall Stadium; Madison, WI	L 20–23	45,274	
October 21	at Arizona State	Sun Devil Stadium; Tempe, AZ	L 23–24	32,231	
November 4	Washington State^{†}	Parker Stadium; Corvallis, OR	W 14–6	16,716	
November 11	at Washington	Husky Stadium; Seattle, WA	W 3–0	51,500	
November 18	BYU	Parker Stadium; Corvallis, OR	W 35–0	8,495	
November 25	at Oregon	Hayward Field; Eugene, OR (Civil War)	W 6–2	21,300	
December 2	at Houston	Houston Stadium; Houston, TX	L 12–23	12,000	
^{†}Homecoming; Rankings from AP Poll released prior to the game; Source:

== Roster ==
- QB Terry Baker, Jr.
- E Don Kasso, Sr.
- T Mike Kline, Sr.
- HB Hank Rivera, Sr.
- HB Leroy Whittle, So.
- FB Bruce Williams, So.

== Professional football drafts ==
=== NFL draft ===
Player	Position	Round	Pick	NFL club
Hank Rivera	Defensive back	5	67	Cleveland Browns
Roger Johnson	Halfback	16	222	New York Giants
Don Kasso	Halfback	17	230	St. Louis Cardinals

=== AFL draft ===
Player	Position	Round	Pick	AFL Club
Mike Kline	Guard	11	82	Denver Broncos
Don Kasso	Halfback	22	170	Denver Broncos
