= Ron Hull =

American college player and coach (1940–2001)

Biographical details
- Born: April 18, 1940; Clovis, New Mexico, U.S.
- Died: July 22, 2001 (aged 61)

Playing career
- 1959–1961: UCLA
- Position: Center

Coaching career (HC unless noted)
- 1963–1975: Cal State Los Angeles (assistant)
- 1976–1977: Cal State Los Angeles

Head coaching record
- Overall: 9–8–1

Accomplishments and honors

Awards
- First-team All-American (1961); First-team All-PCC (1961)

Ronnie Edward Hull (April 18, 1940 – July 22, 2001) was an American college football player and coach. He played for the UCLA Bruins football team from 1959 to 1961. He was captain of the 1961 UCLA football team that won the conference championship and lost to Minnesota in the 1962 Rose Bowl. He was selected by the Football Writers Association of America as the first-team center on the 1961 College Football All-America Team. Hull later worked for 37 years as a physical education instructor at Cal State Los Angeles and was the school's head football coach in 1976 and 1977. He died of heart failure at age 61 in 2001.

== Head coaching record ==
Year	Team	Overall	Conference	Standing	Bowl/playoffs
Cal State Los Angeles Diablos (California Collegiate Athletic Association) (1976–1977)
1976	Cal State Los Angeles	5–3–1	0–1	4th	
1977	Cal State Los Angeles	4–5	0–0	NA	
Cal State Los Angeles:		9–8–1	0–1		
Total:		9–8–1			
