= Mike Martin (Canadian football) =

American gridiron football player (born 1940)

Profile
- Positions: Defensive tackle, Defensive end

Personal information
- Born: August 3, 1940; Beaumont, Texas, U.S.
- Listed height: 6 ft 3 in (1.91 m)
- Listed weight: 230 lb (104 kg)

Career information
- College: Washington State
- NFL draft: 1962: 17th round, 236th overall pick
- AFL draft: 1962: 20th round, 154th overall pick

Career history
- 1962–1968: BC Lions

Awards and highlights
- Grey Cup champion (1964)

Edward "Mike" Martin (born August 3, 1940, date of death unknown) was an American professional football who played for the BC Lions. He won the Grey Cup with them in 1964. He played college football at Washington State University. Martin is deceased.
