= Mel Melin =

American football player (born 1940)

No. 10
- Position: Quarterback

Personal information
- Born: June 7, 1940 (age 86)
- Listed height: 6 ft 1 in (1.85 m)
- Listed weight: 194 lb (88 kg)

Career information
- High school: Olympia (WA)
- College: Washington State
- AFL draft: 1962: 6th round, 45th overall pick

Career history
- 1962–1965: BC Lions

Awards and highlights
- Grey Cup champion (1964); Second-team All-PCC (1960)

Melvin R. Melin (born June 7, 1940) is an American former professional football backup quarterback for the BC Lions.

Mel Melin played college football for Washington State University, reaching the Shrine Bowl game. Melin joined the BC Lions in 1962 as a backup quarterback to Joe Kapp. He stayed in the position throughout his 4-year career, playing in 2 games as a rookie, 1 game in 1963, and no game in the last 2 years. In that stretch, the Lions appeared in but lost the 51st Grey Cup in 1963 but won the 52nd Grey Cup in 1964. In the 1965 CFL season, the Lions missed the playoffs with a 6-9-1 record. After the season, Melin was released and never played again. Overall, he completed 7 of 15 passes for 138 yards, 0 touchdowns, 0 interceptions.
