= Hal Bedsole =

American football player (1941–2017)

No. 19, 86
- Position: Tight end

Personal information
- Born: December 21, 1941; Chicago, Illinois, U.S.
- Died: December 22, 2017 (aged 76); Arizona, U.S.
- Listed height: 6 ft 5 in (1.96 m)
- Listed weight: 236 lb (107 kg)

Career information
- High school: Reseda (Los Angeles, California)
- College: USC
- NFL draft: 1964: 2nd round, 19th overall pick
- AFL draft: 1964: 8th round, 58th overall pick

Career history
- Minnesota Vikings (1964–1966)

Awards and highlights
- National champion (1962); Consensus All-American (1962); 2× First-team All-PCC (1961, 1962)

Career NFL statistics
- Receptions: 26
- Receiving yards: 418
- Receiving touchdowns: 8
- Stats at Pro Football Reference
- College Football Hall of Fame

Harold Jay Bedsole (December 21, 1941 – December 22, 2017) was an American football player. He played as a tight end and end early in his career during the single platoon days.

== Early life and college ==
Bedsole prepped at Reseda High School, graduated in 1959. He played college football for the University of Southern California (USC). He helped lead the USC Trojans to a national championship in 1962 under coach John McKay. Bedsole was a two-time First-team All AAWU Conference (now known as the Pac-12 Conference) selection and the first Trojan to have 200 receiving yards in a single game. He was inducted into the USC Athletics Hall of Fame in 2001 and into the College Football Hall of Fame in 2012. He transferred to USC from Pierce College.

== Professional career ==
Bedsole played for the Minnesota Vikings of the National Football League (NFL) between 1964 and 1966. After his football career ended, due to knee injuries he worked in sales and marketing at KNX-FM, a ground breaking soft rock radio station in Los Angeles.
