= Ben Wilson (fullback) =

American football player (1939–2023)

No. 36
- Positions: Fullback, Halfback

Personal information
- Born: March 9, 1939; Houston, Texas, U.S.
- Died: July 29, 2023 (aged 84); Hot Springs, Arkansas, U.S.
- Listed height: 6 ft 0 in (1.83 m)
- Listed weight: 225 lb (102 kg)

Career information
- High school: Carver (Houston)
- College: USC (1958-1962)
- NFL draft: 1962: 5th round, 68th overall pick
- AFL draft: 1962: 28th round, 224th overall pick

Career history
- Los Angeles Rams (1963–1965); Green Bay Packers (1967–1968)

Awards and highlights
- Super Bowl champion (II); NFL champion (1967); National champion (1962); First-team All-PCC (1961)

Career NFL statistics
- Rushing yards: 1,589
- Rushing average: 3.7
- Receptions: 47
- Receiving yards: 487
- Total touchdowns: 11
- Stats at Pro Football Reference

Ben Ivery Wilson (March 9, 1939 – July 29, 2023) was an American professional football player who was a fullback in the National Football League (NFL). He played college football for the USC Trojans.

== High school ==
Wilson attended Aldine Carver High School where he played football and was also the state champ in the shot put. While at Carver, he was a Jones scholar who was offered an academic scholarship to attend the University of Cincinnati, but he wanted to play football. Although he was an exceptional football player, he did not receive a scholarship offer from any white college in Texas because of segregation.

== College career ==
The superintendent of Wilson's high school had contacts at USC and Wilson received a scholarship to attend USC. He played for 3 seasons, rushing for 1,035 yards and four touchdowns, while also catching 7 passes for 73 yards. While at USC, Wilson became the starting fullback and team captain of USC's 1962 national championship team.

== Professional career ==
Wilson played running back for five seasons in the NFL. He was traded from the Los Angeles Rams to the Green Bay Packers prior to the 1967 season. Wilson started the season as the team's #2 fullback behind Jim Grabowski, but eventually became the starter when Grabowski suffered a season-ending injury. Wilson finished the season as the team's second leading rusher with 453 yards and caught 14 passes for another 88, but suffered injuries of his own in the final month, leading Chuck Mercein to take over his starting spot for the Packers playoff wins against the Los Angeles Rams and Dallas Cowboys in the postseason. But just 15 minutes before the opening kickoff of Super Bowl II, Wilson was named the starter at fullback, where he was the game's leading rusher with 62 yards in 17 carries. Late in the game he lost a contact lens on the sidelines after being tackled, and missed the rest of the game.

Wilson missed the following season as a result of knee surgery. He attempted a comeback in 1969, but failed the team physical and decided to retire.

== Death ==
Ben Wilson died at the CHI St. Vincent hospital in Hot Springs, Arkansas, on July 29, 2023, at the age of 84.
