= 1961 Mississippi Vocational Delta Devils football team =

American college football season

1961 Mississippi Vocational Delta Devils football
- Conference: South Central Athletic Conference
- Record: 2–5 (0–2 SCAC)
- Head coach: Doug Porter (1st season)
- Home stadium: Magnolia Stadium

The 1961 Mississippi Vocational Delta Devils football team represented Mississippi Vocational College (now known as Mississippi Valley State University) as a member of the South Central Athletic Conference (SCAC) during the 1961 college football season. Led by first-year head coach Doug Porter, the Delta Devils compiled an overall record of 2–5.

== Schedule ==
| Date | Opponent | Site | Result | Source |
|---|---|---|---|---|
| September 30 | Jackson State* | Magnolia Stadium; Itta Bena, MS | L 0–39 | |
| October 7 | Mississippi Industrial | Magnolia Stadium; Itta Bena, MS | L 13–42 | |
| October 14 | at Grambling* | Grambling Stadium; Grambling, LA | L 0–69 | |
| October 21 | Bishop* | Magnolia Stadium; Itta Bena, MS | L 7–21 | |
| October 28 | at Alcorn A&M | Henderson Stadium; Lorman, MS | L 0–34 | |
| November 4 | South Carolina State*^{†} | Magnolia Stadium; Itta Bena, MS | W 13–8 | |
| November 18 | at Rust* | Holly Springs, MS | W 14–0 | |
*Non-conference game; ^{†}Homecoming
