= 1961 Wiley Wildcats football team =

American college football season

1961 Wiley Wildcats football
- Conference: Southwestern Athletic Conference
- Record: 4–4–1 (2–4–1 SWAC)
- Head coach: Fred T. Long (31st season)
- Home stadium: Wildcat Stadium

1961 Southwestern Athletic Conference football standings
	Conf.					Overall
Team	W		L		T	W		L		T
Jackson State $	6	–	1	–	0	9	–	2	–	0
Grambling	5	–	2	–	0	8	–	2	–	0
Southern	5	–	2	–	0	7	–	3	–	0
Texas Southern	5	–	2	–	0	6	–	3	–	0
Prairie View A&M	3	–	4	–	0	5	–	4	–	1
Wiley	2	–	4	–	1	4	–	4	–	1
Arkansas AM&N	1	–	5	–	1	3	–	6	–	1
Texas College	0	–	7	–	0	0	–	9	–	0
$ – Conference champion

The 1961 Wiley Wildcats football team represented Wiley College as a member of the Southwestern Athletic Conference (SWAC) during the 1961 college football season. Led by 31st-year head coach Fred T. Long, the Wildcats compiled an overall record of 4–4–1, with a conference record of 2–4–1, and finished sixth in the SWAC.

== Schedule ==
Date	Opponent	Site	Result	Attendance	Source
September 30	Alcorn A&M*	Wildcat Stadium; Marshall, TX	W 16–13		
October 7	Bishop*	Wildcat Stadium; Marshall, TX	W 24–12		
October 16	vs. Prairie View A&M	Cotton Bowl; Dallas, TX (State Fair Classic)	L 13–48	15,000	
October 21	at Arkansas AM&N	Pumphrey Stadium; Pine Bluff, AR	T 7–7		
October 28	Texas Southern	Wildcat Stadium; Marshall, TX	L 0–20		
November 4	at Jackson State	Alumni Stadium; Jackson, MS	L 0–20	3,500	
November 11	Southern	Wildcat Stadium; Marshall, TX	W 19–14	4,000	
November 19	at Grambling	Grambling Stadium; Grambling, LA	L 28–71		
November 23	Texas College	Wildcat Stadium; Marshall, TX	W 56–0		
*Non-conference game
