= 1961 Texas College Steers football team =

American college football season

1961 Texas College Steers football
- Conference: Southwestern Athletic Conference
- Record: 0–9 (0–7 SWAC)
- Home stadium: Steer Stadium

1961 Southwestern Athletic Conference football standings
	Conf.					Overall
Team	W		L		T	W		L		T
Jackson State $	6	–	1	–	0	9	–	2	–	0
Grambling	5	–	2	–	0	8	–	2	–	0
Southern	5	–	2	–	0	7	–	3	–	0
Texas Southern	5	–	2	–	0	6	–	3	–	0
Prairie View A&M	3	–	4	–	0	5	–	4	–	1
Wiley	2	–	4	–	1	4	–	4	–	1
Arkansas AM&N	1	–	5	–	1	3	–	6	–	1
Texas College	0	–	7	–	0	0	–	9	–	0
$ – Conference champion

The 1961 Texas College Steers football team represented Texas College as a member of the Southwestern Athletic Conference (SWAC) during the 1961 college football season. The Steers compiled an overall record of 0–9 and a mark of 0–7 in conference play, and finished eighth in the SWAC.

== Schedule ==
Date	Opponent	Site	Result	Attendance	Source
September 23	at Grambling	Grambling Stadium; Grambling, LA	L 0–59		
September 30	Arkansas AM&N	Steer Stadium; Tyler, TX	L 34–6		
October 7	vs. Langston*	Farrington Field; Fort Worth, TX	L 7–45	3,746	
October 14	at Texas Southern	Jeppesen Stadium; Houston, TX	L 12–52		
October 21	at Dillard*	Alumni Stadium; New Orleans, LA	L 12–28	3,000	
October 28	at Southern	University Stadium; Baton Rouge, LA	L 0–59		
November 4	Prairie View A&M	Steer Stadium; Tyler, TX	L 0–41		
November 18	Jackson State	Steer Stadium; Tyler, TX	L 0–78		
November 23	at Wiley	Wildcat Stadium; Marshall, TX	L 0–56		
*Non-conference game
