= 1961 Southern Jaguars football team =

American college football season

1961 Southern Jaguars football
- Conference: Southwestern Athletic Conference
- Record: 7–3 (5–2 SWAC)
- Head coach: Ace Mumford (26th season)
- Home stadium: University Stadium

1961 Southwestern Athletic Conference football standings
	Conf.					Overall
Team	W		L		T	W		L		T
Jackson State $	6	–	1	–	0	9	–	2	–	0
Grambling	5	–	2	–	0	8	–	2	–	0
Southern	5	–	2	–	0	7	–	3	–	0
Texas Southern	5	–	2	–	0	6	–	3	–	0
Prairie View A&M	3	–	4	–	0	5	–	4	–	1
Wiley	2	–	4	–	1	4	–	4	–	1
Arkansas AM&N	1	–	5	–	1	3	–	6	–	1
Texas College	0	–	7	–	0	0	–	9	–	0
$ – Conference champion

The 1961 Southern Jaguars football team was an American football team that represented Southern University as a member of the Southwestern Athletic Conference (SWAC) during the 1961 college football season. Led by Ace Mumford in his 26th season as head coach, the Jaguars compiled an overall record of 7–3, with a mark of 5–2 in conference play, and finished tied for second in the SWAC.

== Schedule ==
Date	Opponent	Site	Result	Attendance	Source
September 23	Texas Southern	University Stadium; Baton Rouge, LA	L 6–14		
September 30	at Grambling	Grambling Stadium; Grambling, LA (rivalry)	W 20–9		
October 7	Dillard*	University Stadium; Baton Rouge, LA	W 43–6		
October 14	Arkansas AM&N	University Stadium; Baton Rouge, LA	W 26–8		
October 21	vs. Jackson State	Ladd Stadium; Mobile, AL (Claver Classic, rivalry)	W 17–7	8,000	
October 28	Texas College	University Stadium; Baton Rouge, LA	W 59–0		
November 4	Tennessee A&I*	University Stadium; Baton Rouge, LA	W 7–0		
November 11	at Wiley	Wildcat Stadium; Marshall, TX	L 14–19	4,000	
November 18	at Florida A&M*	Bragg Memorial Stadium; Tallahassee, FL	L 0–46		
November 25	Prairie View A&M	University Stadium; Baton Rouge, LA	W 14–7		
*Non-conference game
