= Bobby Felts =

American football player (1942–1987)

No. 47, 45, 23
- Position: Halfback

Personal information
- Born: June 26, 1942; Miami, Florida, U.S.
- Died: March 7, 1987 (aged 44); Miami, Florida, U.S.
- Listed height: 6 ft 2 in (1.88 m)
- Listed weight: 202 lb (92 kg)

Career information
- High school: Northwestern (Miami)
- College: Florida A&M (1961–1964)
- NFL draft: 1965: 6th round, 71st overall pick

Career history
- Baltimore Colts (1965); Detroit Lions (1965–1967); Montreal Alouettes (1969)

Awards and highlights
- Black college national champion (1961); AP small college national champion (1962)
- Stats at Pro Football Reference

Bobby Lee Felts (June 26, 1942 – March 7, 1987) was an American professional football halfback who played in the National Football League (NFL) with the Baltimore Colts and Detroit Lions. He played college football for the Florida A&M Rattlers, and was selected by the Colts in the sixth round of the 1965 NFL draft.

== Early life ==
Bobby Lee Felts was on June 26, 1942, in Miami, Florida. He attended Miami Northwestern Senior High School.

== College career ==
Felts enrolled at Florida A&M University to play college football for the Rattlers. He played for the Rattlers from 1961 to 1964. They were Black college national champions in 1961 and AP small college national champions in 1962. At the conclusion of his college career, Felts played in the Senior Bowl. He was inducted into Florida A&M's athletics hall of fame in 1985.

== Professional career ==
On November 28, 1964, Felts was selected by the Baltimore Colts in the sixth round, with the 71st overall pick, of the 1965 NFL draft and by the Houston Oilers in the 13th round, with the 98th overall pick, of the 1965 AFL draft. He signed with the Colts on December 8, 1964. He played in seven games for Baltimore during the 1965 season before being waived on November 4, 1965.

Felts was claimed off waivers by the Detroit Lions on November 4, 1965. He appeared in 31 games, starting two, for the Lions from 1965 to 1967. He was released on September 10, 1968, before the start of the 1968 regular season. Felts finished his NFL career with totals of 66 carries for 207 yards and two touchdowns, five receptions for 29 yards, 38 kick returns for 814 yards, and six punt returns for 46 yards.

Felts signed with the Montreal Alouettes of the Canadian Football League on March 19, 1969. He played in four games for the Alouettes, recording 23 rushing attempts for 94 yards and one touchdown, five catches for 68 yards and one touchdown, and seven kickoff returns for 205 yards. Felts reportedly suffered six different injuries during his time with the Alouettes. He was released on September 5, 1969.

== Personal life ==
Felts died on March 7, 1987, in Miami.
