= 1961 Texas Southern Tigers football team =

American college football season

1961 Texas Southern Tigers football
- Conference: Southwestern Athletic Conference
- Record: 6–3 (5–2 SWAC)
- Head coach: Alexander Durley (13th season)
- Home stadium: Jeppesen Stadium

1961 Southwestern Athletic Conference football standings
	Conf.					Overall
Team	W		L		T	W		L		T
Jackson State $	6	–	1	–	0	9	–	2	–	0
Grambling	5	–	2	–	0	8	–	2	–	0
Southern	5	–	2	–	0	7	–	3	–	0
Texas Southern	5	–	2	–	0	6	–	3	–	0
Prairie View A&M	3	–	4	–	0	5	–	4	–	1
Wiley	2	–	4	–	1	4	–	4	–	1
Arkansas AM&N	1	–	5	–	1	3	–	6	–	1
Texas College	0	–	7	–	0	0	–	9	–	0
$ – Conference champion

The 1961 Texas Southern Tigers football team was an American football team that represented Texas Southern University as a member of the Southwestern Athletic Conference (SWAC) during the 1961 college football season. Led by 13th-year head coach Alexander Durley, the Tigers compiled an overall record of 6–3, with a mark of 5–2 in conference play, and finished tied for second in the SWAC.

== Schedule ==
Date	Opponent	Site	Result	Source
September 23	at Southern	University Stadium; Baton Rouge, LA	W 14–6	
October 7	Prairie View A&M	Jeppesen Stadium; Houston, TX (rivalry)	W 29–14	
October 14	Texas College	Jeppesen Stadium; Houston, TX	W 52–12	
October 21	vs. Corpus Christi*	Public School Stadium; Galveston, TX	W 47–6	
October 28	at Wiley	Wildcat Stadium; Marshall, TX	W 20–0	
November 4	at Grambling	Grambling Stadium; Grambling, LA	L 19–23	
November 11	Jackson State	Jeppesen Stadium; Houston, TX	L 7–12	
November 18	Arkansas AM&N	Jeppesen Stadium; Houston, TX	W 43–12	
November 25	at No. 4 Florida A&M*	Bragg Memorial Stadium; Tallahassee, FL	L 7–48	
*Non-conference game; Rankings from AP Poll released prior to the game
