= 1961 Tennessee A&I Tigers football team =

American college football season

1961 Tennessee A&I Tigers football

MWAA champion
- Conference: Midwest Athletic Association
- Record: 4–4–1 (3–0 MWAA)
- Head coach: Lawrence Simmons (1st season)
- Home stadium: Hale Stadium

1961 Midwest Athletic Association football standings
	Conf.					Overall
Team	W		L		T	W		L		T
No. 13 Tennessee A&I $	3	–	0	–	0	4	–	4	–	1
No. 14 Central State (OH)	2	–	1	–	0	7	–	1	–	0
Kentucky State	1	–	2	–	0	6	–	3	–	0
Lincoln (MO)	0	–	3	–	0	2	–	6	–	0
$ – Conference champion; Rankings from Pittsburgh Courier

The 1961 Tennessee A&I Tigers football team represented Tennessee Agricultural & Industrial State College (now known as Tennessee State University) as a member of the Midwest Athletic Association (MWAA) during the 1961 college football season. Led by first-year head coach Lawrence Simmons, the Tigers compiled an overall record of 4–4–1, with a 3–0 conference record, and finished as MWAA champion.

== Schedule ==
Date	Opponent	Site	Result	Attendance	Source
September 16	Prairie View A&M*	Hale Stadium; Nashville, TN	T 21–21	6,000	
September 23	North Carolina A&T*	Hale Stadium; Nashville, TN	W 37–21	5,492	
September 30	at Morris Brown*	Herndon Stadium; Atlanta, GA	L 8–21	7,000	
October 7	Grambling*	Hale Stadium; Nashville, TN	L 8–25	5,192	
October 21	Central State (OH)	Hale Stadium; Nashville, TN	W 28–13	4,563	
November 4	at Southern*	University Stadium; Baton Rouge, LA	L 0–7	5,000	
November 11	at Lincoln (MO)	Lincoln Field; Jefferson City, MO	W 27–20	2,500	
November 18	at Kentucky State	Alumni Field; Frankfort, KY	W 14–10	1,200	
November 23	Jackson State*	Hale Stadium; Nashville, TN	L 6–12		
*Non-conference game
