= 1961 Grambling Tigers football team =

American college football season

1961 Grambling Tigers football
- Conference: Southwestern Athletic Conference
- Record: 8–2 (5–2 SWAC)
- Head coach: Eddie Robinson (19th season)
- Home stadium: Grambling Stadium

1961 Southwestern Athletic Conference football standings
	Conf.					Overall
Team	W		L		T	W		L		T
Jackson State $	6	–	1	–	0	9	–	2	–	0
Grambling	5	–	2	–	0	8	–	2	–	0
Southern	5	–	2	–	0	7	–	3	–	0
Texas Southern	5	–	2	–	0	6	–	3	–	0
Prairie View A&M	3	–	4	–	0	5	–	4	–	1
Wiley	2	–	4	–	1	4	–	4	–	1
Arkansas AM&N	1	–	5	–	1	3	–	6	–	1
Texas College	0	–	7	–	0	0	–	9	–	0
$ – Conference champion

The 1961 Grambling Tigers football team was an American football team that represented Grambling College (now known as Grambling State University) as a member of the Southwestern Athletic Conference (SWAC) during the 1961 college football season. In their 19th year head coach Eddie Robinson, the Tigers compiled an 8–2 record (5–2 in conference games), tied for second place in the SWAC.

Key players included Pro Football Hall of Fame defensive back Willie Brown, guard/linebacker Garland Boyette, kick returner Jerry Robinson, tackle Buck Buchanan, and quarterback Ron Pennington.

The team played its home games at Grambling Stadium in Grambling, Louisiana.

== Schedule ==
Date	Opponent	Site	Result	Attendance	Source
September 23	Texas College	Grambling Stadium; Grambling, LA	W 59–0		
September 30	Southern	Grambling Stadium; Grambling, LA (rivalry)	L 9–20		
October 7	at Tennessee A&I*	Hale Stadium; Nashville, TN	W 25–8	5,192	
October 14	Mississippi Vocational*	Grambling Stadium; Grambling, LA	W 69–0		
October 23	vs. Prairie View A&M	State Fair Stadium; Shreveport, LA (rivalry)	W 34–14	5,000	
October 28	at Jackson State	Alumni Stadium; Jackson, MS	L 13–14	6,000	
November 4	Texas Southern^{†}	Grambling Stadium; Grambling, LA	W 23–19	8,000	
November 11	at Arkansas AM&N	Pumphrey Stadium; Pine Bluff, AR	W 23–7		
November 19	Wiley	Grambling Stadium; Grambling, LA	W 71–28		
November 25	at Alcorn A&M	Henderson Stadium; Lorman, MS	W 49–0		
*Non-conference game; ^{†}Homecoming
