= 1961 Arkansas AM&N Golden Lions football team =

American college football season

1961 Arkansas AM&N Golden Lions football
- Conference: Southwestern Athletic Conference
- Record: 3–6–1 (1–5–1 SWAC)
- Head coach: Charles Spearman (4th season)
- Home stadium: Pumphrey Stadium

1961 Southwestern Athletic Conference football standings
	Conf.					Overall
Team	W		L		T	W		L		T
Jackson State $	6	–	1	–	0	9	–	2	–	0
Grambling	5	–	2	–	0	8	–	2	–	0
Southern	5	–	2	–	0	7	–	3	–	0
Texas Southern	5	–	2	–	0	6	–	3	–	0
Prairie View A&M	3	–	4	–	0	5	–	4	–	1
Wiley	2	–	4	–	1	4	–	4	–	1
Arkansas AM&N	1	–	5	–	1	3	–	6	–	1
Texas College	0	–	7	–	0	0	–	9	–	0
$ – Conference champion

The 1961 Arkansas AM&N Golden Lions football team represented the Arkansas Agricultural, Mechanical and Normal College (now known as the University of Arkansas at Pine Bluff) as a member of the Southwestern Athletic Conference (SWAC) during the 1961 college football season. Led by Charles Spearman in his fifth and final season as head coach, the Golden Lions compiled an overall record of 3–6–1, with a conference record of 1–5–1, and finished seventh in the SWAC.

== Schedule ==
Date	Opponent	Site	Result	Source
September 16	at Philander Smith*	War Memorial Stadium; Little Rock, AR	W 45–8	
September 23	Lincoln (MO)*	Pumphrey Stadium; Pine Bluff, AR	W 19–12	
September 30	at Texas College	Steer Stadium; Tyler, TX	W 6–34	
October 7	Jackson State	Pumphrey Stadium; Pine Bluff, AR	L 6–19	
October 14	at Southern	University Stadium; Baton Rouge, LA	L 8–26	
October 21	Wiley	Pumphrey Stadium; Pine Bluff, AR	T 7–7	
October 28	Prairie View A&M	Pumphrey Stadium; Pine Bluff, AR	L 16–25	
November 4	at Alcorn A&M*	Henderson Stadium; Lorman, MS	L 18–20	
November 11	Grambling	Pumphrey Stadium; Pine Bluff, AR	L 7–23	
November 18	at Texas Southern	Jeppesen Stadium; Houston, TX	L 12–43	
*Non-conference game
