= Pete Pedro =

American football player (1940–2018)

- Pedro in 1963

No. 21
- Positions: Halfback, fullback

Personal information
- Born: June 16, 1940; Boston, Massachusetts, U.S.
- Died: April 22, 2018 (aged 77); Lynn, Massachusetts, U.S.
- Listed height: 5 ft 7 in (1.70 m)
- Listed weight: 175 lb (79 kg)

Career information
- High school: Lynn Trade School
- College: Trinidad JC; West Texas State (1961–1963)
- AFL draft: 1964: 16th round, 124th overall pick

Career history
- 1964: Boston Patriots*
- * Offseason or practice squad member only

Awards and highlights
- NCAA TD leader (1961); Third-team All-American (1961)

Pete Pedro (June 16, 1940 – April 22, 2018), sometimes also known as the "Flying Fragment," "Pistol Pete", "The Road Runner," "Peep-Peep," and "The Texas Jackrabbit," was an American football halfback and fullback. He played for West Texas State from 1961 to 1963. He ranked second in the country in rushing yardage (966 yards) and first in touchdowns (22) in the 1961 college football season. Among the first minorities to play football in the Texas state university system, Pedro was inducted into the West Texas A&M Athletic Hall of Champions in 1988. He also played professional football on the Boston Patriots' taxi squad in 1964, for the New Bedford Sweepers in 1965 and 1966, and for the Lowell Giants in 1967.

== Early life ==
Pedro grew up in Lynn, Massachusetts, the son of a Black father and a Puerto Rican mother. He attended Lynn Trade School, later renamed Lynn Vocational and Technical Institute. He starred in baseball, football and basketball at Lynn Tech. He also won a Golden Gloves flyweight championship as a boxer.

== College football ==
=== Trinidad Junior College ===
Pedro began his college football career at Trinidad Junior College (now known as Trinidad State College) in Trinidad, Colorado. Pedro was unhappy at Trinidad and returned to Lynn after one semester. He later recalled: "It was good football, but the atmosphere wasn't the best. The dorm was like a barracks and you would get fed a certain number of meals depending on whether you started or how well you played."

=== West Texas State ===
Known for his speed, he ran the 100-yard dash in 9.6 seconds. He was recruited to West Texas State by head coach Joe Kerbel. Pedro's mother was initially reluctant to have her son attend a Southern school where he would have to sit in the back of the bus. Coach Kerbel replied, "Ma'am, if your boy is as fast as everyone says he is, he can sit in my lap in the front of the bus."

Pedro joined West Texas in 1961. When Pedro joined the team, he was "among the first minorities to play football in the Texas state university system." (The University of Texas did not integrate its football team until the late 1960s.) In his second game for West Texas, a 56–27 victory over Texas Western, Pedro gained 235 rushing yards and scored six touchdowns, including touchdown runs of 75 and 53 yards. An El Paso sports writer described Pedro's performance as "burst after burst of spectacular speed and elusive wraithery". The Associated Press selected Pedro as the Back of the Week, and coach Kerbel boasted that Pedro was "the greatest running back I've ever seen," pointing to his combination of speed, strength, balance, and "good action, whirls, spins and does whatever is necessary to elude tackles."

Pedro ranked second behind Preacher Pilot among all major college players in the country with 966 rushing yards on 137 carries for an average of 7.1 yards per carry. He also ranked second in the country in scoring with 132 points and led the country with 22 touchdowns. At the end of the 1961 season, Pedro was also selected by the Newspaper Enterprise Association as a third-team back on the 1961 All-America college football team. It was the highest honor received to that date by a West Texas State player.

As a junior in 1962, and despite suffering an ankle injury midway through the season, Pedro gained 831 rushing yards and led the team to a 9–2 record and a victory over Ohio in the Sun Bowl.

As a senior in 1963, he led the country in rushing with 400 yards after three games, but he sustained a knee injury and did not play for the remainder of the season. In 23 games for West Texas State, Pedro gained 2,157 rushing yards, an average of 6.8 yards per carry, and scored 33 touchdowns.

== Professional football ==
Pedro was selected by the Boston Patriots in the 1964 AFL draft and signed a contract with the club in December 1963. He played for the Patriots in preseason games, but spent the regular season on the Patriots' taxi squad.

Pedro signed with the Toronto Argonauts of the Canadian Football League in March 1965, but he was placed on waivers in late July, one week before the start of the regular season. He also played for the New Bedford Sweepers in 1965 and 1966 and for the Lowell Giants in 1967. He gained 389 rushing yards and 417 punt return yards for New Bedford in 1965.

== Family, legacy and later years ==
Pedro married Gloria Jean Quintero in Pampa, Texas, in January 1964.

After his playing career ended, Pedro worked as the physical director at the Gregg House starting in 1967. He later worked as a physical education teacher for six years at an elementary school in Lynn. He also worked as an assistant physical director at the Lynn YMCA and coached cross country at Lynn Tech and football at Lynn English High School. In 1981, he joined General Electric, where he became a foreman in the aircraft division.

Pedro was inducted into the West Texas A&M Athletic Hall of Champions in 1988. In 2000, he was picked as a top 100 sports legend of the Texas Panhandle.

Pedro died in April 2018 at age 75 at his home in Lynn.

== See also ==
- 1961 college football season#Rushing
- 1961 college football season#Scoring
- List of NCAA major college football yearly rushing leaders#Rushing leaders
