= 1961 Prairie View A&M Panthers football team =

American college football season

1961 Prairie View A&M Panthers football
- Conference: Southwestern Athletic Conference
- Record: 5–4–1 (3–4 SWAC)
- Head coach: Billy Nicks (13th season)
- Home stadium: Edward L. Blackshear Field

1961 Southwestern Athletic Conference football standings
	Conf.					Overall
Team	W		L		T	W		L		T
Jackson State $	6	–	1	–	0	9	–	2	–	0
Grambling	5	–	2	–	0	8	–	2	–	0
Southern	5	–	2	–	0	7	–	3	–	0
Texas Southern	5	–	2	–	0	6	–	3	–	0
Prairie View A&M	3	–	4	–	0	5	–	4	–	1
Wiley	2	–	4	–	1	4	–	4	–	1
Arkansas AM&N	1	–	5	–	1	3	–	6	–	1
Texas College	0	–	7	–	0	0	–	9	–	0
$ – Conference champion

The 1961 Prairie View A&M Panthers football team represented Prairie View A&M College of Texas (now known as Prairie View A&M University) as a member of the Southwestern Athletic Conference (SWAC) during the 1961 college football season. Led by 13th-year head coach Billy Nicks, the Panthers compiled an overall record of 5–4–1, with a conference record of 3–4, and finished fifth in the SWAC.

== Schedule ==
Date	Opponent	Site	Result	Attendance	Source
September 16	at Tennessee A&I*	Hale Stadium; Nashville, TN	T 21–21	6,000	
September 23	Jackson State	Edward L. Blackshear Field; Prairie View, TX	L 14–20		
October 7	at Texas Southern	Jeppesen Stadium; Houston, TX (rivalry)	L 14–29		
October 16	vs. Wiley	Cotton Bowl; Dallas, TX (State Fair Classic)	W 48–13	15,000	
October 23	vs. Grambling	State Fair Stadium; Shreveport, LA	L 14–34	5,000	
October 28	at Arkansas AM&N	Pumphrey Stadium; Pine Bluff, AR	W 25–16		
November 4	at Texas College	Steer Stadium; Tyler, TX	W 41–0		
November 11	Bishop*^{†}	Edward L. Blackshear Field; Prairie View, TX	W 20–2	10,000	
November 18	at Alcorn A&M*	Henderson Stadium; Lorman, MS	W 37–7		
November 25	at Southern	University Stadium; Baton Rouge, LA	L 7–14		
*Non-conference game; ^{†}Homecoming
