= 1961 college football season =

American college football season

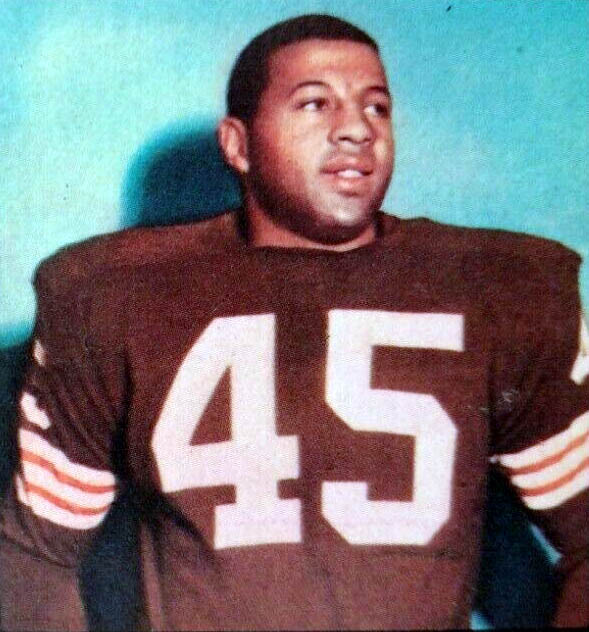
- 1961 Heisman Trophy winner Ernie Davis
- Preseason AP No. 1: Iowa
- Regular season: September 23 – December 2, 1961
- Number of bowls: 11
- Bowl games: December 9, 1961 – January 1, 1962
- Champion(s): Alabama (AP, Coaches, NFF); Ohio State (FWAA)
- Heisman: Syracuse halfback Ernie Davis

The 1961 college football season was the 93rd season of intercollegiate football in the United States. Two teams have a claim to the 1961 major college national championship:

- Alabama (11–0), led by Bear Bryant, won the Southeastern Conference championship and defeated No. 9 Arkansas in the Sugar Bowl. Alabama was ranked No. 1 in the final Associated Press (AP) writers poll and United Press International (UPI) coaches poll and recognized as national champion by nine other selectors, including the National Football Foundation. The team was led on offense by quarterback Pat Trammell. Tackle Billy Neighbors was a consensus All-American.
- Ohio State (8–0–1), led by Woody Hayes, won the Big Ten championship. The Buckeyes were invited to the Rose Bowl, but the university faculty council voted to reject the invitation. Ohio State was ranked No. 2 in the final AP and UPI polls and were rated as the national champion by the Football Writers Association of America. Fullback Bob Ferguson won the Maxwell Award.

Pittsburg State (11–0) was declared small college national champion by the AP and UPI and also won the NAIA national championship. Florida A&M (10–0) was the black college national champion. Washington and Lee (9–0) won Timmie Trophy as the outstanding small college football team in the country.

Syracuse halfback Ernie Davis won the Heisman Trophy. Wisconsin quarterback Ron Miller won the Sammy Baugh Trophy, and Utah State tackle Merlin Olsen won the Outland Trophy. Individual statistical leaders in major college football for 1961 included Iowa State halfback Dave Hoppmann with 1,638 yards of total offense, San Jose State quarterback Chon Gallegos with 117 pass completions and 14 touchdown passes, Washington State end Hugh Campbell with 53 pass receptions, and New Mexico State halfback Preacher Pilot with 1,278 rushing yards and 138 points scored.

== Conference and program changes ==
| School | 1960 Conference | 1961 Conference |
|---|---|---|
| Arizona Wildcats | Border | Independent |
| Denver Pioneers | Mountain States | dropped program |
| Marquette Golden Avalanche | Independent | dropped program |

== Season chronology ==
=== September ===
In the preseason poll released on September 18, Iowa was ranked No. 1, and Ohio State No. 2. SEC teams Alabama and LSU were third and fifth, and Texas was fourth. Rounding out the top ten were No. 6 Michigan State, No. 7 Penn State, No. 8 Kansas, No. 9 Mississippi, and No. 10 Syracuse.

As the regular season progressed, new polls were issued on the Monday following the weekend's games. The Big Ten schools would not kick off until September 30. On September 23, No. 3 Alabama won, 32–6, at Georgia, and No. 4 Texas won at California, 28–3. In Houston, No. 5 LSU lost to Rice, 16–3. No. 9 Mississippi, which had shut out Arkansas 16–0, and No. 10 Syracuse, which had beaten Oregon State 19–8 in Portland, rose into the top five. In the poll that followed, Iowa remained No. 1, followed by No. 2 Mississippi, No. 3 Ohio State, No. 4 Alabama, and No. 5 Syracuse. Texas dropped to sixth place.

September 30 California played a top-ranked team for the second straight week, losing at No. 1 Iowa 28–7. No. 2 Mississippi won 20–6 at Kentucky. Texas Christian University (TCU) tied No. 3 Ohio State 7–7 at Columbus. In a game at Mobile, No. 4 Alabama beat Tulane 9–0. No. 5 Syracuse defeated visiting West Virginia 29–14, but fell to seventh in the next ratings. No. 6 Texas, which beat Texas Tech at home, 42–14, returned to the Top Five, along with previously unranked Georgia Tech, which shut out Rice 24–0. In the poll that followed, Iowa remained No. 1, followed by No. 2 Mississippi, No. 3 Georgia Tech, No. 4 Alabama, and No. 5 Texas.

=== October ===
October 7 No. 1 Iowa won 35–34 at USC. No. 2 Mississippi won 33–0 against Florida State. No. 3 Georgia Tech lost to LSU 10–0. No. 4 Alabama won 35–6 at Vanderbilt. No. 5 Texas routed Washington State 41–8. No. 6 Michigan State defeated Stanford 31–3. In the poll that followed, Mississippi took over first place from Iowa, which dropped to second. These were followed by No. 3 Alabama, No. 4 Texas, and No. 5 Michigan State.

October 14 No. 1 Mississippi met the Houston Cougars at Memphis and won 47–7. No. 2 Iowa beat Indiana 27–8 at home. No. 3 Alabama beat North Carolina State 26–7 at Birmingham, and No. 4 Texas played its annual game against Oklahoma at Dallas, winning 28–7. No. 5 Michigan State won at No. 6 Michigan, shutting out the Wolverines 28–0. On the next poll, Michigan State took the No. 1 spot from Ole Miss by a margin of only two points (431 to 429), though the Rebels had more first place votes than the Spartans (21 vs. 16). They were followed by No. 3 Texas, No. 4 Iowa, and No. 5 Alabama.

On October 21, No. 1 Michigan State got by No. 6 Notre Dame 17–7 at home, and No. 2 Mississippi shut out Tulane in a game at Jackson, 41–0. No. 3 Texas won at No. 10 Arkansas, 33–7, No. 4 Iowa hosted Wisconsin, winning 47–15, and No. 5 Alabama defeated Tennessee at Birmingham, 34–3. The top three (Michigan State, Ole Miss and Texas) were unchanged, while Alabama and Iowa traded places at 4th and 5th.

October 28 In a week of shutouts, No. 1 Michigan State beat Indiana 35–0, and No. 2 Mississippi had an even bigger blowout, 47–0, against Vanderbilt. No. 3 Texas beat the visiting Rice Owls, 34–7, while No. 4 Alabama won at Houston over the Cougars, 17–0. No. 5 Iowa was on the wrong side of a shutout, losing 9–0 at Purdue. The top 4 stayed the same, while No. 6 Ohio State, which had won at Wisconsin 30–21, took fifth place from Iowa, whom they would play the following Saturday.

=== November ===
November 4 No. 1 Michigan State fell to unranked Minnesota, 13–0. At the same time, No. 2 Mississippi lost to No. 6 LSU 10–7 at Baton Rouge. The No. 3 Texas Longhorns beat the SMU Mustangs at Dallas, 27–0. No. 4 Alabama shut out Mississippi State 24–0. At Columbus, No. 5 Ohio State beat No. 9 Iowa 29–13. Texas, Alabama and Ohio State moved up to 1st, 2nd and 3rd, and giant-killers LSU and Minnesota were 4th and 5th. Michigan State and Ole Miss fell to 6th and 7th.

November 11 No. 1 Texas beat Baylor, 33–7. No. 2 Alabama crushed the visiting Richmond Spiders (which would be I-AA later) 66–0 at home. No. 3 Ohio State won 16–7 at Indiana, No. 4 LSU won 30–0 at North Carolina, and No. 5 Minnesota handed Iowa its third straight loss, 16–9. The Hawkeyes, ranked first in the preseason poll, would finish just 5–4. No. 6 Michigan State, too, lost its second straight, falling 7–6 at Purdue. The Top Five remained unchanged.

November 18 Texas Christian University had earlier tied Ohio State 6–6 in Columbus, and bested that with a win over No. 1 Texas in Austin, 6–0. After his team's loss, legendary Texas coach Darrell Royal uttered his immortal description of TCU: "They're like a bunch of cockroaches. It's not what they eat and tote off, it's what they fall into and mess up that hurts."

No. 2 Alabama beat Georgia Tech in Birmingham, 10–0. No. 3 Ohio State defeated visiting Oregon, 22–12, and No. 4 LSU hosted Mississippi State and won 14–6. No. 5 Minnesota defeated No. 7 Purdue, 10–7, at home. Alabama (9–0) rose to No. 1, with Ohio State (7–0–1) at No. 2. Minnesota (7–1) rose to No. 3, LSU (8–1) stayed at No. 4 and Texas (8–1) fell from No. 1 to No. 5.

Post-Thanksgiving (November 25) No. 1 Alabama was idle. No. 2 Ohio State won at Michigan, 50–20. No. 3 Minnesota narrowly lost to Wisconsin 23–21. No. 4 LSU crushed visiting Tulane, 62–0. No. 5 Texas won 25–0 over Texas A&M, wrapping up the SWC title and a berth in the Cotton Bowl. Ole Miss, which was idle, returned to the Top Five: No. 1 Alabama, No. 2 Ohio State, No. 3 LSU, No. 4 Texas, and No. 5 Mississippi.

=== December ===
December 2, No. 1 Alabama won its annual Birmingham game against the Auburn Tigers, 34–0, to close the season with a 10–0–0 record, an SEC championship, and a berth in the Sugar Bowl against No. 9 Arkansas. No. 5 Mississippi closed its season at 9–1–0 with a 37–7 win against Mississippi State and prepared to meet Texas in the Cotton Bowl. For the third year in a row, Ole Miss was undefeated and untied against all opponents other than LSU, which had beaten them in 1959 and 1961 and tied them in 1960. The Bayou Bengals would meet the Big 8 champion, No. 7 Colorado, in the Orange Bowl.

With 26 of the 48 first place votes, Alabama was awarded the AP trophy, ahead of Ohio State (by a margin of 26 votes to 20). The point total was even closer, with 16 points separating Alabama and Ohio State (452 to 436). Unbeaten and tied only once, Ohio State University qualified for the Rose Bowl. In a move that stunned the sports world, however, the university's faculty council voted, 28–25, on November 28 not to accept the invitation, declaring that the school's emphasis on sports over academics was excessive. The wire service commented that "A team of 57 Ohio State University faculty members handed the second ranked Buckeyes their only defeat of the season.". Minnesota took the Buckeyes' place in the Rose Bowl, where they would play UCLA.

== Conference standings ==
=== Major colleges ===
1961 Athletic Association of Western Universities football standings
| | Conf. | | | | | Overall |
| Team | W | | L | | T | W | | L | | T |
|---|---|---|---|---|---|---|---|---|---|---|
| No. 16 UCLA $ | 3 | – | 1 | – | 0 | 7 | – | 4 | – | 0 |
| USC | 2 | – | 1 | – | 1 | 4 | – | 5 | – | 1 |
| Washington | 2 | – | 1 | – | 1 | 5 | – | 4 | – | 1 |
| Stanford | 1 | – | 3 | – | 0 | 4 | – | 6 | – | 0 |
| California | 1 | – | 3 | – | 0 | 1 | – | 8 | – | 1 |
$ – Conference champion; Rankings from AP poll

1961 Atlantic Coast Conference football standings
| | Conf. | | | Overall |
| Team | W | | L | W | | L |
|---|---|---|---|---|---|---|
| No. 20 Duke $ | 5 | – | 1 | 7 | – | 3 |
| North Carolina | 4 | – | 3 | 5 | – | 5 |
| Maryland | 3 | – | 3 | 7 | – | 3 |
| Clemson | 3 | – | 3 | 5 | – | 5 |
| NC State | 3 | – | 4 | 4 | – | 6 |
| South Carolina | 3 | – | 4 | 4 | – | 6 |
| Wake Forest | 3 | – | 4 | 4 | – | 6 |
| Virginia | 2 | – | 4 | 4 | – | 6 |
$ – Conference champion; Rankings from AP poll

1961 Big Eight Conference football standings
| | Conf. | | | | | Overall |
| Team | W | | L | | T | W | | L | | T |
|---|---|---|---|---|---|---|---|---|---|---|
| No. 7 Colorado $ | 7 | – | 0 | – | 0 | 9 | – | 2 | – | 0 |
| No. 11 Missouri | 5 | – | 2 | – | 0 | 7 | – | 2 | – | 1 |
| Kansas | 5 | – | 2 | – | 0 | 7 | – | 3 | – | 1 |
| Oklahoma | 4 | – | 3 | – | 0 | 5 | – | 5 | – | 0 |
| Iowa State | 3 | – | 4 | – | 0 | 5 | – | 5 | – | 0 |
| Oklahoma State | 2 | – | 5 | – | 0 | 4 | – | 6 | – | 0 |
| Nebraska | 2 | – | 5 | – | 0 | 3 | – | 6 | – | 1 |
| Kansas State | 0 | – | 7 | – | 0 | 2 | – | 8 | – | 0 |
$ – Conference champion; Rankings from AP Poll

1961 Big Ten Conference football standings
| | Conf. | | | | | Overall |
| Team | W | | L | | T | W | | L | | T |
|---|---|---|---|---|---|---|---|---|---|---|
| No. 2 Ohio State $ | 6 | – | 0 | – | 0 | 8 | – | 0 | – | 1 |
| No. 6 Minnesota | 6 | – | 1 | – | 0 | 8 | – | 2 | – | 0 |
| No. 8 Michigan State | 5 | – | 2 | – | 0 | 7 | – | 2 | – | 0 |
| No. 12 Purdue | 4 | – | 2 | – | 0 | 6 | – | 3 | – | 0 |
| Wisconsin | 4 | – | 3 | – | 0 | 6 | – | 3 | – | 0 |
| Michigan | 3 | – | 3 | – | 0 | 6 | – | 3 | – | 0 |
| Iowa | 2 | – | 4 | – | 0 | 5 | – | 4 | – | 0 |
| Northwestern | 2 | – | 4 | – | 0 | 4 | – | 5 | – | 0 |
| Indiana | 0 | – | 6 | – | 0 | 2 | – | 7 | – | 0 |
| Illinois | 0 | – | 7 | – | 0 | 0 | – | 9 | – | 0 |
$ – Conference champion; Rankings from AP Poll

1961 Border Conference football standings
| | Conf. | | | | | Overall |
| Team | W | | L | | T | W | | L | | T |
|---|---|---|---|---|---|---|---|---|---|---|
| Arizona State § | 3 | – | 0 | – | 0 | 7 | – | 3 | – | 0 |
| West Texas State | 3 | – | 1 | – | 0 | 6 | – | 4 | – | 0 |
| New Mexico State | 2 | – | 1 | – | 0 | 5 | – | 4 | – | 1 |
| Texas Western | 1 | – | 3 | – | 0 | 3 | – | 7 | – | 0 |
| Hardin–Simmons | 0 | – | 4 | – | 0 | 0 | – | 10 | – | 0 |
$ – Conference champion

1961 Ivy League football standings
| | Conf. | | | | | Overall |
| Team | W | | L | | T | W | | L | | T |
|---|---|---|---|---|---|---|---|---|---|---|
| Columbia + | 6 | – | 1 | – | 0 | 6 | – | 3 | – | 0 |
| Harvard + | 6 | – | 1 | – | 0 | 6 | – | 3 | – | 0 |
| Dartmouth | 5 | – | 2 | – | 0 | 6 | – | 3 | – | 0 |
| Princeton | 5 | – | 2 | – | 0 | 5 | – | 4 | – | 0 |
| Yale | 3 | – | 4 | – | 0 | 4 | – | 5 | – | 0 |
| Cornell | 2 | – | 5 | – | 0 | 3 | – | 6 | – | 0 |
| Penn | 1 | – | 6 | – | 0 | 2 | – | 7 | – | 0 |
| Brown | 0 | – | 7 | – | 0 | 0 | – | 9 | – | 0 |
+ – Conference co-champions

1961 Missouri Valley Conference football standings
| | Conf. | | | | | Overall |
| Team | W | | L | | T | W | | L | | T |
|---|---|---|---|---|---|---|---|---|---|---|
| Wichita $ | 3 | – | 0 | – | 0 | 8 | – | 3 | – | 0 |
| North Texas State | 1 | – | 2 | – | 0 | 5 | – | 4 | – | 1 |
| Cincinnati | 1 | – | 2 | – | 0 | 3 | – | 7 | – | 0 |
| Tulsa | 1 | – | 2 | – | 0 | 2 | – | 8 | – | 0 |
$ – Conference champion

1961 Skyline Conference football standings
| | Conf. | | | | | Overall |
| Team | W | | L | | T | W | | L | | T |
|---|---|---|---|---|---|---|---|---|---|---|
| No. 10 Utah State + | 5 | – | 0 | – | 1 | 9 | – | 1 | – | 1 |
| Wyoming + | 5 | – | 0 | – | 1 | 6 | – | 1 | – | 2 |
| New Mexico | 3 | – | 3 | – | 0 | 7 | – | 4 | – | 0 |
| Utah | 3 | – | 3 | – | 0 | 6 | – | 4 | – | 0 |
| Montana | 2 | – | 4 | – | 0 | 2 | – | 6 | – | 0 |
| BYU | 2 | – | 4 | – | 0 | 2 | – | 8 | – | 0 |
| Colorado State | 0 | – | 6 | – | 0 | 0 | – | 10 | – | 0 |
+ – Conference co-champions; Rankings from AP Poll

1961 Southeastern Conference football standings
| | Conf. | | | | | Overall |
| Team | W | | L | | T | W | | L | | T |
|---|---|---|---|---|---|---|---|---|---|---|
| No. 1 Alabama + | 7 | – | 0 | – | 0 | 11 | – | 0 | – | 0 |
| No. 4 LSU + | 6 | – | 0 | – | 0 | 10 | – | 1 | – | 0 |
| No. 5 Ole Miss | 5 | – | 1 | – | 0 | 9 | – | 2 | – | 0 |
| No. 13 Georgia Tech | 4 | – | 3 | – | 0 | 7 | – | 4 | – | 0 |
| Tennessee | 4 | – | 3 | – | 0 | 6 | – | 4 | – | 0 |
| Florida | 3 | – | 3 | – | 0 | 4 | – | 5 | – | 1 |
| Auburn | 3 | – | 4 | – | 0 | 6 | – | 4 | – | 0 |
| Kentucky | 2 | – | 4 | – | 0 | 5 | – | 5 | – | 0 |
| Georgia | 2 | – | 5 | – | 0 | 3 | – | 7 | – | 0 |
| Mississippi State | 1 | – | 5 | – | 0 | 5 | – | 5 | – | 0 |
| Tulane | 1 | – | 5 | – | 0 | 2 | – | 8 | – | 0 |
| Vanderbilt | 1 | – | 6 | – | 0 | 2 | – | 8 | – | 0 |
+ – Conference co-champions; Rankings from AP Poll

1961 Southern Conference football standings
| | Conf. | | | | | Overall |
| Team | W | | L | | T | W | | L | | T |
|---|---|---|---|---|---|---|---|---|---|---|
| The Citadel $ | 5 | – | 1 | – | 0 | 7 | – | 3 | – | 0 |
| Richmond | 5 | – | 2 | – | 0 | 5 | – | 5 | – | 0 |
| VMI | 4 | – | 2 | – | 0 | 6 | – | 4 | – | 0 |
| West Virginia | 2 | – | 1 | – | 0 | 4 | – | 6 | – | 0 |
| Furman | 2 | – | 2 | – | 0 | 7 | – | 3 | – | 0 |
| George Washington | 3 | – | 4 | – | 0 | 3 | – | 6 | – | 0 |
| Virginia Tech | 2 | – | 3 | – | 0 | 4 | – | 5 | – | 0 |
| Davidson | 1 | – | 4 | – | 0 | 4 | – | 4 | – | 0 |
| William & Mary | 1 | – | 6 | – | 0 | 1 | – | 9 | – | 0 |
$ – Conference champion

1961 Southwest Conference football standings
| | Conf. | | | | | Overall |
| Team | W | | L | | T | W | | L | | T |
|---|---|---|---|---|---|---|---|---|---|---|
| No. 3 Texas + | 6 | – | 1 | – | 0 | 10 | – | 1 | – | 0 |
| No. 9 Arkansas + | 6 | – | 1 | – | 0 | 8 | – | 3 | – | 0 |
| Rice | 5 | – | 2 | – | 0 | 7 | – | 4 | – | 0 |
| Texas A&M | 3 | – | 4 | – | 0 | 4 | – | 5 | – | 1 |
| TCU | 2 | – | 4 | – | 1 | 3 | – | 5 | – | 2 |
| Baylor | 2 | – | 5 | – | 0 | 6 | – | 5 | – | 0 |
| Texas Tech | 2 | – | 5 | – | 0 | 4 | – | 6 | – | 0 |
| SMU | 1 | – | 5 | – | 1 | 2 | – | 7 | – | 1 |
+ – Conference co-champions; Rankings from AP Poll

=== Small colleges ===
1961 Arkansas Intercollegiate Conference football standings
| | Conf. | | | | | Overall |
| Team | W | | L | | T | W | | L | | T |
|---|---|---|---|---|---|---|---|---|---|---|
| No. 17 Arkansas Tech $ | 6 | – | 0 | – | 1 | 8 | – | 0 | – | 1 |
| Arkansas State Teachers | 5 | – | 2 | – | 0 | 7 | – | 3 | – | 0 |
| Southern State (AR) | 5 | – | 2 | – | 0 | 6 | – | 3 | – | 0 |
| Harding | 4 | – | 3 | – | 0 | 4 | – | 5 | – | 0 |
| Henderson State | 3 | – | 3 | – | 0 | 4 | – | 6 | – | 0 |
| Ouachita Baptist | 2 | – | 3 | – | 1 | 4 | – | 4 | – | 1 |
| Arkansas A&M | 1 | – | 6 | – | 0 | 2 | – | 8 | – | 0 |
| Ozarks | 0 | – | 7 | – | 0 | 0 | – | 8 | – | 0 |
$ – Conference champion; Rankings from NAIA poll

1961 Badger-Gopher Conference football standings
| | Conf. | | | | | Overall |
| Team | W | | L | | T | W | | L | | T |
|---|---|---|---|---|---|---|---|---|---|---|
| Lakeland $ | 4 | – | 0 | – | 0 | 4 | – | 3 | – | 1 |
| Northland | 3 | – | 1 | – | 0 | 4 | – | 4 | – | 0 |
| Bethel (MN) | 2 | – | 2 | – | 0 | 4 | – | 4 | – | 0 |
| Milton | 1 | – | 3 | – | 0 | 4 | – | 3 | – | 0 |
| Northwestern (WI) | 0 | – | 4 | – | 0 | 1 | – | 5 | – | 1 |
$ – Conference champion

1961 California Collegiate Athletic Association football standings
| | Conf. | | | | | Overall |
| Team | W | | L | | T | W | | L | | T |
|---|---|---|---|---|---|---|---|---|---|---|
| No. 3/5 Fresno State $ | 5 | – | 0 | – | 0 | 10 | – | 0 | – | 0 |
| Cal Poly | 3 | – | 2 | – | 0 | 4 | – | 4 | – | 0 |
| San Diego State | 2 | – | 2 | – | 1 | 7 | – | 2 | – | 1 |
| Los Angeles State | 2 | – | 2 | – | 1 | 4 | – | 4 | – | 1 |
| Long Beach State | 2 | – | 3 | – | 0 | 5 | – | 5 | – | 0 |
| UC Santa Barbara | 0 | – | 5 | – | 0 | 2 | – | 8 | – | 0 |
$ – Conference champion; Rankings from AP/UPI small college polls

1961 Carolinas Conference football standings
| | Conf. | | | | | Overall |
| Team | W | | L | | T | W | | L | | T |
|---|---|---|---|---|---|---|---|---|---|---|
| No. 15 Lenoir Rhyne $ | 6 | – | 1 | – | 0 | 8 | – | 1 | – | 1 |
| Appalachian State | 5 | – | 1 | – | 0 | 7 | – | 3 | – | 0 |
| Newberry | 4 | – | 2 | – | 0 | 5 | – | 5 | – | 1 |
| East Carolina | 4 | – | 3 | – | 0 | 5 | – | 4 | – | 1 |
| Elon | 3 | – | 4 | – | 0 | 4 | – | 6 | – | 0 |
| Catawba | 3 | – | 4 | – | 0 | 3 | – | 7 | – | 0 |
| Western Carolina | 2 | – | 5 | – | 0 | 4 | – | 6 | – | 0 |
| Guilford | 0 | – | 7 | – | 0 | 0 | – | 9 | – | 0 |
$ – Conference champion; Rankings from NAIA poll

1961 Central Intercollegiate Athletic Association football standings
| | Conf. | | | | | Overall |
| Team | W | | L | | T | W | | L | | T |
|---|---|---|---|---|---|---|---|---|---|---|
| North Carolina College $ | 5 | – | 0 | – | 2 | 7 | – | 0 | – | 2 |
| North Carolina A&T | 5 | – | 1 | – | 0 | 5 | – | 4 | – | 0 |
| Johnson C. Smith | 6 | – | 1 | – | 0 | 8 | – | 1 | – | 0 |
| Winston-Salem State | 5 | – | 1 | – | 1 | 6 | – | 1 | – | 1 |
| Maryland State | 2 | – | 2 | – | 1 | 4 | – | 2 | – | 1 |
| Delaware State | 5 | – | 2 | – | 0 | 7 | – | 3 | – | 0 |
| Virginia Union | 4 | – | 3 | – | 1 | 5 | – | 3 | – | 1 |
| Morgan State | 5 | – | 4 | – | 0 | 5 | – | 4 | – | 0 |
| Virginia State | 3 | – | 4 | – | 1 | 3 | – | 4 | – | 1 |
| Hampton | 3 | – | 3 | – | 0 | 6 | – | 3 | – | 0 |
| Elizabeth City State | 3 | – | 4 | – | 0 | 4 | – | 4 | – | 0 |
| St. Augustine's | 3 | – | 5 | – | 0 | 4 | – | 5 | – | 0 |
| Fayetteville State | 2 | – | 4 | – | 0 | 3 | – | 6 | – | 0 |
| Howard | 1 | – | 5 | – | 0 | 1 | – | 8 | – | 0 |
| Shaw | 1 | – | 8 | – | 0 | 1 | – | 8 | – | 0 |
| Saint Paul's (VA) | 0 | – | 6 | – | 0 | 0 | – | 8 | – | 0 |
$ – Conference champion; Conference standings were based on the Dickinson System.

1961 Central Intercollegiate Conference football standings
| | Conf. | | | | | Overall |
| Team | W | | L | | T | W | | L | | T |
|---|---|---|---|---|---|---|---|---|---|---|
| No. 1/1 Pittsburg State $^ | 5 | – | 0 | – | 0 | 11 | – | 0 | – | 0 |
| Omaha | 4 | – | 1 | – | 0 | 6 | – | 3 | – | 0 |
| Fort Hays State | 3 | – | 2 | – | 0 | 4 | – | 4 | – | 1 |
| St. Benedict's | 2 | – | 3 | – | 0 | 2 | – | 7 | – | 0 |
| Emporia State | 1 | – | 4 | – | 0 | 1 | – | 8 | – | 0 |
| Washburn | 0 | – | 5 | – | 0 | 3 | – | 6 | – | 0 |
$ – Conference champion; ^ – NAIA playoff participant; Rankings from NAIA poll and AP small college poll

1961 College Conference of Illinois football standings
| | Conf. | | | | | Overall |
| Team | W | | L | | T | W | | L | | T |
|---|---|---|---|---|---|---|---|---|---|---|
| No. 14 Millikin $ | 6 | – | 0 | – | 0 | 8 | – | 0 | – | 0 |
| Carroll (WI) | 5 | – | 1 | – | 0 | 6 | – | 3 | – | 0 |
| Carthage | 4 | – | 2 | – | 0 | 7 | – | 2 | – | 0 |
| North Central (IL) | 3 | – | 3 | – | 0 | 5 | – | 4 | – | 0 |
| Augustana (IL) | 2 | – | 4 | – | 0 | 5 | – | 4 | – | 0 |
| Illinois Wesleyan | 1 | – | 5 | – | 0 | 2 | – | 7 | – | 0 |
| Lake Forest | 0 | – | 6 | – | 0 | 0 | – | 8 | – | 0 |
$ – Conference champion; Rankings from NAIA poll

1961 Eastern Intercollegiate Athletic Conference football standings
| | Conf. | | | | | Overall |
| Team | W | | L | | T | W | | L | | T |
|---|---|---|---|---|---|---|---|---|---|---|
| South Carolina Trade $ | 3 | – | 0 | – | 0 | 6 | – | 2 | – | 0 |
| Kittrell | 2 | – | 1 | – | 0 | ? | – | ? | – | ? |
| Friendship | 1 | – | 2 | – | 0 | ? | – | ? | – | ? |
| Voorhees | 0 | – | 3 | – | 0 | ? | – | ? | – | ? |
| Livingstone * | 1 | – | 0 | – | 0 | 5 | – | 4 | – | 0 |
| Norfolk State * | 0 | – | 1 | – | 0 | 3 | – | 4 | – | 0 |
$ – Conference champion; * – did not play enough conference games to be eligible for championship

1961 Evergreen Conference football standings
| | Conf. | | | | | Overall |
| Team | W | | L | | T | W | | L | | T |
|---|---|---|---|---|---|---|---|---|---|---|
| Central Washington $ | 6 | – | 1 | – | 0 | 7 | – | 2 | – | 0 |
| Whitworth * | 6 | – | 1 | – | 0 | ? | – | ? | – | ? |
| Western Washington | 4 | – | 3 | – | 0 | 5 | – | 4 | – | 0 |
| Puget Sound | 3 | – | 3 | – | 1 | 5 | – | 3 | – | 1 |
| Pacific Lutheran | 1 | – | 5 | – | 1 | 2 | – | 6 | – | 1 |
| Eastern Washington | 0 | – | 7 | – | 0 | 0 | – | 9 | – | 0 |
$ – Conference champion; * – on probation; ineligible for conference title

1961 Far Western Conference football standings
| | Conf. | | | | | Overall |
| Team | W | | L | | T | W | | L | | T |
|---|---|---|---|---|---|---|---|---|---|---|
| No. 13/16 Humboldt State + | 4 | – | 1 | – | 0 | 8 | – | 2 | – | 0 |
| San Francisco State + | 4 | – | 1 | – | 0 | 8 | – | 2 | – | 0 |
| UC Davis | 3 | – | 2 | – | 0 | 5 | – | 4 | – | 0 |
| Nevada | 2 | – | 3 | – | 0 | 5 | – | 4 | – | 0 |
| Sacramento State | 2 | – | 3 | – | 0 | 4 | – | 5 | – | 0 |
| Chico State | 0 | – | 5 | – | 0 | 4 | – | 6 | – | 0 |
+ – Conference co-champions; Rankings from NAIA poll and UPI small college poll

1961 Frontier Conference football standings
| | Conf. | | | | | Overall |
| Team | W | | L | | T | W | | L | | T |
|---|---|---|---|---|---|---|---|---|---|---|
| Arizona State–Flagstaff $ | 1 | – | 0 | – | 1 | 3 | – | 5 | – | 1 |
| New Mexico Western | 1 | – | 1 | – | 0 | 4 | – | 5 | – | 0 |
| New Mexico Highlands | 0 | – | 1 | – | 1 | 3 | – | 3 | – | 1 |
$ – Conference champion

1961 Gulf States Conference football standings
| | Conf. | | | | | Overall |
| Team | W | | L | | T | W | | L | | T |
|---|---|---|---|---|---|---|---|---|---|---|
| No. 7 Southeastern Louisiana + | 4 | – | 1 | – | 0 | 9 | – | 1 | – | 0 |
| No. 10 McNeese State + | 4 | – | 1 | – | 0 | 7 | – | 2 | – | 0 |
| Northwestern State | 3 | – | 2 | – | 0 | 7 | – | 3 | – | 0 |
| Louisiana Tech | 3 | – | 2 | – | 0 | 5 | – | 4 | – | 0 |
| Northeast Louisiana State | 1 | – | 4 | – | 0 | 3 | – | 7 | – | 0 |
| Southwestern Louisiana | 0 | – | 5 | – | 0 | 2 | – | 8 | – | 0 |
+ – Conference co-champions; Rankings from NAIA poll

1961 Hoosier Conference football standings
| | Conf. | | | | | Overall |
| Team | W | | L | | T | W | | L | | T |
|---|---|---|---|---|---|---|---|---|---|---|
| Taylor + | 4 | – | 1 | – | 0 | 8 | – | 1 | – | 0 |
| Anderson (IN) + | 4 | – | 1 | – | 0 | 4 | – | 4 | – | 0 |
| Hanover | 3 | – | 2 | – | 0 | 3 | – | 6 | – | 0 |
| Indiana Central | 2 | – | 3 | – | 0 | 4 | – | 5 | – | 0 |
| Franklin (IN) | 1 | – | 4 | – | 0 | 3 | – | 6 | – | 0 |
| Manchester (IN) | 1 | – | 4 | – | 0 | 1 | – | 8 | – | 0 |
+ – Conference co-champions

1961 Indiana Collegiate Conference football standings
| | Conf. | | | | | Overall |
| Team | W | | L | | T | W | | L | | T |
|---|---|---|---|---|---|---|---|---|---|---|
| Butler $ | 6 | – | 0 | – | 0 | 9 | – | 0 | – | 0 |
| Valparaiso | 5 | – | 1 | – | 0 | 7 | – | 2 | – | 0 |
| Evansville | 3 | – | 3 | – | 0 | 4 | – | 5 | – | 0 |
| DePauw | 2 | – | 4 | – | 0 | 5 | – | 4 | – | 0 |
| Ball State | 2 | – | 4 | – | 0 | 2 | – | 5 | – | 1 |
| Indiana State | 2 | – | 4 | – | 0 | 2 | – | 6 | – | 0 |
| Saint Joseph's (IN) | 1 | – | 5 | – | 0 | 1 | – | 7 | – | 0 |
$ – Conference champion

1961 Interstate Intercollegiate Athletic Conference football standings
| | Conf. | | | | | Overall |
| Team | W | | L | | T | W | | L | | T |
|---|---|---|---|---|---|---|---|---|---|---|
| Southern Illinois $ | 5 | – | 1 | – | 0 | 7 | – | 3 | – | 0 |
| Western Illinois | 4 | – | 2 | – | 0 | 5 | – | 3 | – | 0 |
| Illinois State Normal | 4 | – | 2 | – | 0 | 5 | – | 4 | – | 0 |
| Eastern Illinois | 3 | – | 2 | – | 1 | 4 | – | 3 | – | 1 |
| Northern Illinois | 3 | – | 2 | – | 1 | 4 | – | 4 | – | 1 |
| Central Michigan | 1 | – | 5 | – | 0 | 2 | – | 8 | – | 0 |
| Eastern Michigan | 0 | – | 6 | – | 0 | 0 | – | 8 | – | 1 |
$ – Conference champion

1961 Iowa Conference football standings
| | Conf. | | | | | Overall |
| Team | W | | L | | T | W | | L | | T |
|---|---|---|---|---|---|---|---|---|---|---|
| No. 12 Parsons $ | 8 | – | 0 | – | 0 | 9 | – | 0 | – | 0 |
| Luther | 6 | – | 2 | – | 0 | 6 | – | 3 | – | 0 |
| Central (IA) | 5 | – | 3 | – | 0 | 6 | – | 3 | – | 0 |
| Upper Iowa | 5 | – | 3 | – | 0 | 6 | – | 3 | – | 0 |
| Dubuque | 4 | – | 4 | – | 0 | 5 | – | 4 | – | 0 |
| Buena Vista | 3 | – | 5 | – | 0 | 4 | – | 5 | – | 0 |
| Iowa Wesleyan | 3 | – | 5 | – | 0 | 3 | – | 7 | – | 0 |
| Wartburg | 2 | – | 6 | – | 0 | 2 | – | 7 | – | 0 |
| Simpson (IA) | 0 | – | 8 | – | 0 | 1 | – | 8 | – | 0 |
$ – Conference champion; Rankings from NAIA poll

1961 Kansas Collegiate Athletic Conference football standings
| | Conf. | | | | | Overall |
| Team | W | | L | | T | W | | L | | T |
|---|---|---|---|---|---|---|---|---|---|---|
| No. 16 Ottawa $ | 9 | – | 0 | – | 0 | 9 | – | 0 | – | 0 |
| College of Emporia | 8 | – | 1 | – | 0 | 8 | – | 1 | – | 0 |
| Southwestern (KS) | 6 | – | 2 | – | 1 | 6 | – | 2 | – | 1 |
| Baker | 6 | – | 3 | – | 0 | 6 | – | 3 | – | 0 |
| Bethany (KS) | 3 | – | 4 | – | 2 | 3 | – | 4 | – | 2 |
| Kansas Wesleyan | 4 | – | 5 | – | 0 | 4 | – | 5 | – | 0 |
| Bethel (KS) | 3 | – | 6 | – | 0 | 3 | – | 6 | – | 0 |
| McPherson | 3 | – | 6 | – | 0 | 3 | – | 6 | – | 0 |
| Sterling | 1 | – | 8 | – | 0 | 1 | – | 8 | – | 0 |
| Friends | 0 | – | 8 | – | 1 | 0 | – | 8 | – | 1 |
$ – Conference champion; Rankings from NAIA poll

1961 Lone Star Conference football standings
| | Conf. | | | | | Overall |
| Team | W | | L | | T | W | | L | | T |
|---|---|---|---|---|---|---|---|---|---|---|
| Sam Houston State $ | 7 | – | 0 | – | 0 | 8 | – | 1 | – | 0 |
| Texas A&I | 5 | – | 2 | – | 0 | 7 | – | 2 | – | 0 |
| Lamar Tech | 4 | – | 2 | – | 1 | 8 | – | 2 | – | 1 |
| Howard Payne | 4 | – | 3 | – | 0 | 4 | – | 5 | – | 0 |
| East Texas State | 3 | – | 4 | – | 0 | 4 | – | 6 | – | 0 |
| Southwest Texas State | 2 | – | 4 | – | 1 | 4 | – | 5 | – | 1 |
| Sul Ross | 1 | – | 6 | – | 0 | 3 | – | 7 | – | 0 |
| Stephen F. Austin | 1 | – | 6 | – | 0 | 1 | – | 9 | – | 0 |
$ – Conference champion

1961 Mason–Dixon Conference football standings
| | Conf. | | | | | Overall |
| Team | W | | L | | T | W | | L | | T |
|---|---|---|---|---|---|---|---|---|---|---|
| Western Maryland $ | 4 | – | 0 | – | 0 | 7 | – | 2 | – | 0 |
| Gallaudet * | 1 | – | 0 | – | 0 | 1 | – | 6 | – | 0 |
| Johns Hopkins | 1 | – | 1 | – | 0 | 3 | – | 4 | – | 1 |
| Hampden–Sydney | 2 | – | 2 | – | 0 | 3 | – | 6 | – | 0 |
| Randolph–Macon | 1 | – | 2 | – | 0 | 4 | – | 5 | – | 0 |
| Bridgewater | 0 | – | 4 | – | 0 | 0 | – | 8 | – | 0 |
$ – Conference champion; * – Ineligible for title

1961 Michigan Intercollegiate Athletic Association football standings
| | Conf. | | | | | Overall |
| Team | W | | L | | T | W | | L | | T |
|---|---|---|---|---|---|---|---|---|---|---|
| Albion $ | 5 | – | 0 | – | 0 | 8 | – | 0 | – | 0 |
| Olivet | 4 | – | 1 | – | 0 | 8 | – | 1 | – | 0 |
| Kalamazoo | 3 | – | 2 | – | 0 | 4 | – | 4 | – | 0 |
| Alma | 2 | – | 3 | – | 0 | 2 | – | 6 | – | 0 |
| Adrian | 1 | – | 4 | – | 0 | 2 | – | 6 | – | 0 |
| Hope | 0 | – | 5 | – | 0 | 0 | – | 7 | – | 0 |
$ – Conference champion

1961 Mid-American Conference football standings
| | Conf. | | | | | Overall |
| Team | W | | L | | T | W | | L | | T |
|---|---|---|---|---|---|---|---|---|---|---|
| Bowling Green $ | 5 | – | 1 | – | 0 | 8 | – | 2 | – | 0 |
| Western Michigan | 4 | – | 1 | – | 1 | 5 | – | 4 | – | 1 |
| Miami (OH) | 3 | – | 2 | – | 0 | 6 | – | 4 | – | 0 |
| Ohio | 3 | – | 2 | – | 1 | 5 | – | 3 | – | 1 |
| Toledo | 2 | – | 4 | – | 0 | 3 | – | 7 | – | 0 |
| Marshall | 1 | – | 4 | – | 0 | 2 | – | 7 | – | 1 |
| Kent State | 1 | – | 5 | – | 0 | 2 | – | 8 | – | 0 |
$ – Conference champion

1961 Mid-Ohio League football standings
| | Conf. | | | | | Overall |
| Team | W | | L | | T | W | | L | | T |
|---|---|---|---|---|---|---|---|---|---|---|
| Findlay $ | 5 | – | 0 | – | 0 | 7 | – | 3 | – | 0 |
| Ohio Northern | 4 | – | 1 | – | 0 | 6 | – | 3 | – | 0 |
| Bluffton | 2 | – | 3 | – | 0 | 5 | – | 3 | – | 0 |
| Defiance | 2 | – | 3 | – | 0 | 3 | – | 5 | – | 0 |
| Ashland | 2 | – | 3 | – | 0 | 3 | – | 6 | – | 0 |
| Wilmington (OH) | 0 | – | 5 | – | 0 | 0 | – | 8 | – | 0 |
$ – Conference champion

1961 Middle Atlantic Conference football standings
| | Conf. | | | | | Overall |
| Team | W | | L | | T | W | | L | | T |
|---|---|---|---|---|---|---|---|---|---|---|
University Division
| No. 15 Rutgers x | 4 | – | 0 | – | 0 | 9 | – | 0 | – | 0 |
| Bucknell | 5 | – | 2 | – | 0 | 6 | – | 3 | – | 0 |
| Delaware | 3 | – | 2 | – | 0 | 4 | – | 4 | – | 0 |
| No. 6 Lehigh | 3 | – | 2 | – | 0 | 7 | – | 2 | – | 0 |
| Gettysburg | 2 | – | 2 | – | 1 | 3 | – | 5 | – | 1 |
| Temple | 1 | – | 2 | – | 2 | 2 | – | 5 | – | 2 |
| Lafayette | 1 | – | 5 | – | 1 | 2 | – | 6 | – | 1 |
| Muhlenberg | 0 | – | 4 | – | 0 | 2 | – | 7 | – | 0 |
Northern College Division
| Susquehanna x | 6 | – | 0 | – | 0 | 8 | – | 0 | – | 1 |
| Albright | 4 | – | 0 | – | 1 | 7 | – | 0 | – | 1 |
| Moravian | 4 | – | 1 | – | 1 | 4 | – | 3 | – | 1 |
| Wagner | 4 | – | 2 | – | 0 | 6 | – | 3 | – | 0 |
| Lycoming | 1 | – | 3 | – | 1 | 1 | – | 6 | – | 1 |
| Wilkes | 1 | – | 6 | – | 0 | 1 | – | 6 | – | 0 |
| Hofstra * | 2 | – | 0 | – | 0 | 7 | – | 2 | – | 0 |
| Juniata * | 1 | – | 2 | – | 0 | 3 | – | 4 | – | 0 |
| Upsala * | 0 | – | 4 | – | 0 | 0 | – | 7 | – | 0 |
Southern College Division
| Lebanon Valley x | 5 | – | 1 | – | 0 | 6 | – | 1 | – | 0 |
| Swarthmore | 4 | – | 2 | – | 0 | 5 | – | 2 | – | 0 |
| Western Maryland | 4 | – | 2 | – | 0 | 7 | – | 2 | – | 0 |
| Dickinson | 5 | – | 3 | – | 0 | 5 | – | 3 | – | 0 |
| Pennsylvania Military | 5 | – | 3 | – | 0 | 6 | – | 3 | – | 0 |
| Johns Hopkins | 2 | – | 3 | – | 1 | 3 | – | 4 | – | 1 |
| Ursinus | 2 | – | 5 | – | 0 | 2 | – | 5 | – | 0 |
| Drexel | 1 | – | 5 | – | 1 | 2 | – | 5 | – | 1 |
| Haverford | 0 | – | 6 | – | 1 | 0 | – | 6 | – | 1 |
| West Chester * | 0 | – | 0 | – | 0 | 7 | – | 2 | – | 0 |
| Franklin & Marshall * | 0 | – | 3 | – | 0 | 1 | – | 7 | – | 0 |
x – Division champion/co-champions; * – Ineligible for championship due to insufficient conference games; Rankings from major college AP poll for Rutgers and small college AP poll for Lehigh

1961 Midwest Athletic Association football standings
| | Conf. | | | | | Overall |
| Team | W | | L | | T | W | | L | | T |
|---|---|---|---|---|---|---|---|---|---|---|
| No. 13 Tennessee A&I $ | 3 | – | 0 | – | 0 | 4 | – | 4 | – | 1 |
| No. 14 Central State (OH) | 2 | – | 1 | – | 0 | 7 | – | 1 | – | 0 |
| Kentucky State | 1 | – | 2 | – | 0 | 6 | – | 3 | – | 0 |
| Lincoln (MO) | 0 | – | 3 | – | 0 | 2 | – | 6 | – | 0 |
$ – Conference champion; Rankings from Pittsburgh Courier

1961 Midwest Conference football standings
| | Conf. | | | | | Overall |
| Team | W | | L | | T | W | | L | | T |
|---|---|---|---|---|---|---|---|---|---|---|
| Cornell (IA) + | 6 | – | 2 | – | 0 | 6 | – | 2 | – | 0 |
| Grinnell + | 6 | – | 2 | – | 0 | 6 | – | 2 | – | 0 |
| St. Olaf + | 6 | – | 2 | – | 0 | 6 | – | 2 | – | 0 |
| Carleton | 5 | – | 2 | – | 1 | 5 | – | 2 | – | 1 |
| Ripon | 4 | – | 3 | – | 1 | 4 | – | 3 | – | 1 |
| Coe | 4 | – | 4 | – | 0 | 4 | – | 4 | – | 0 |
| Lawrence | 4 | – | 4 | – | 0 | 4 | – | 4 | – | 0 |
| Beloit | 2 | – | 6 | – | 0 | 2 | – | 6 | – | 0 |
| Knox | 1 | – | 7 | – | 0 | 1 | – | 7 | – | 0 |
| Monmouth (IL) | 1 | – | 7 | – | 0 | 1 | – | 7 | – | 0 |
+ – Conference co-champions

1961 Minnesota Intercollegiate Athletic Conference football standings
| | Conf. | | | | | Overall |
| Team | W | | L | | T | W | | L | | T |
|---|---|---|---|---|---|---|---|---|---|---|
| No. 18 Minnesota–Duluth $ | 7 | – | 0 | – | 0 | 8 | – | 1 | – | 0 |
| Saint John's (MN) | 5 | – | 2 | – | 0 | 6 | – | 2 | – | 0 |
| St. Thomas (MN) | 5 | – | 2 | – | 0 | 6 | – | 3 | – | 0 |
| Macalester | 4 | – | 3 | – | 0 | 6 | – | 3 | – | 0 |
| Augsburg | 3 | – | 4 | – | 0 | 4 | – | 4 | – | 0 |
| Concordia (MN) | 3 | – | 4 | – | 0 | 4 | – | 5 | – | 0 |
| Gustavus Adolphus | 1 | – | 6 | – | 0 | 2 | – | 7 | – | 0 |
| Hamline | 0 | – | 7 | – | 0 | 1 | – | 7 | – | 0 |
$ – Conference champion; Rankings from NAIA poll

1961 Missouri College Athletic Union football standings
| | Conf. | | | | | Overall |
| Team | W | | L | | T | W | | L | | T |
|---|---|---|---|---|---|---|---|---|---|---|
| No. 19 Missouri Valley $ | 4 | – | 0 | – | 0 | 9 | – | 0 | – | 1 |
| William Jewell | 3 | – | 1 | – | 0 | 7 | – | 3 | – | 0 |
| Graceland | 3 | – | 2 | – | 0 | 5 | – | 2 | – | 2 |
| Tarkio | 2 | – | 3 | – | 0 | 2 | – | 7 | – | 0 |
| Central (MO) | 0 | – | 2 | – | 1 | 1 | – | 6 | – | 1 |
| Culver–Stockton | 0 | – | 4 | – | 1 | 1 | – | 6 | – | 2 |
$ – Conference champion; Rankings from NAIA poll

1961 Missouri Intercollegiate Athletic Association football standings
| | Conf. | | | | | Overall |
| Team | W | | L | | T | W | | L | | T |
|---|---|---|---|---|---|---|---|---|---|---|
| NE Missouri State $ | 5 | – | 0 | – | 0 | 9 | – | 1 | – | 0 |
| SE Missouri State | 3 | – | 2 | – | 0 | 5 | – | 5 | – | 0 |
| Missouri–Rolla | 3 | – | 2 | – | 0 | 4 | – | 5 | – | 0 |
| SW Missouri State | 2 | – | 3 | – | 0 | 4 | – | 4 | – | 1 |
| Central Missouri State | 2 | – | 3 | – | 0 | 3 | – | 5 | – | 0 |
| NW Missouri State | 0 | – | 5 | – | 0 | 2 | – | 7 | – | 0 |
$ – Conference champion

1961 Montana Collegiate Conference football standings
| | Conf. | | | | | Overall |
| Team | W | | L | | T | W | | L | | T |
|---|---|---|---|---|---|---|---|---|---|---|
| Western Montana $ | 5 | – | 0 | – | 0 | 7 | – | 1 | – | 1 |
| Eastern Montana | 4 | – | 1 | – | 0 | 5 | – | 3 | – | 0 |
| Carroll (MT) | 2 | – | 2 | – | 1 | 4 | – | 3 | – | 1 |
| Northern Montana | 2 | – | 3 | – | 0 | 2 | – | 5 | – | 0 |
| Rocky Mountain | 1 | – | 4 | – | 0 | ? | – | ? | – | ? |
| Montana Mines | 0 | – | 4 | – | 1 | ? | – | ? | – | ? |
$ – Conference champion

1961 Nebraska College Conference football standings
| | Conf. | | | | | Overall |
| Team | W | | L | | T | W | | L | | T |
|---|---|---|---|---|---|---|---|---|---|---|
| Peru State $ | 5 | – | 0 | – | 1 | 7 | – | 1 | – | 1 |
| Kearney State | 4 | – | 2 | – | 0 | 7 | – | 2 | – | 0 |
| Hastings | 3 | – | 2 | – | 1 | 4 | – | 4 | – | 1 |
| Doane | 2 | – | 2 | – | 2 | 5 | – | 2 | – | 2 |
| Wayne State (NE) | 3 | – | 3 | – | 0 | 4 | – | 5 | – | 0 |
| Chadron State | 2 | – | 4 | – | 0 | 3 | – | 6 | – | 0 |
| Nebraska Wesleyan | 0 | – | 6 | – | 0 | 0 | – | 9 | – | 0 |
$ – Conference champion

1961 North Central Conference football standings
| | Conf. | | | | | Overall |
| Team | W | | L | | T | W | | L | | T |
|---|---|---|---|---|---|---|---|---|---|---|
| South Dakota State + | 5 | – | 1 | – | 0 | 8 | – | 2 | – | 0 |
| State College of Iowa + | 5 | – | 1 | – | 0 | 7 | – | 2 | – | 0 |
| North Dakota | 4 | – | 2 | – | 0 | 6 | – | 3 | – | 0 |
| Augustana (SD) | 4 | – | 2 | – | 0 | 5 | – | 3 | – | 1 |
| Morningside | 2 | – | 4 | – | 0 | 3 | – | 6 | – | 0 |
| North Dakota State | 1 | – | 5 | – | 0 | 3 | – | 6 | – | 0 |
| South Dakota | 0 | – | 6 | – | 0 | 1 | – | 8 | – | 0 |
+ – Conference co-champions

1961 North Dakota Intercollegiate Conference football standings
| | Conf. | | | | | Overall |
| Team | W | | L | | T | W | | L | | T |
|---|---|---|---|---|---|---|---|---|---|---|
| Mayville State $ | 6 | – | 0 | – | 0 | 8 | – | 0 | – | 0 |
| Wahpeton Science | 4 | – | 2 | – | 0 | 6 | – | 2 | – | 0 |
| Dickinson State | 4 | – | 2 | – | 0 | 5 | – | 3 | – | 0 |
| Jamestown | 3 | – | 3 | – | 0 | 4 | – | 4 | – | 0 |
| Minot State | 3 | – | 3 | – | 0 | 4 | – | 5 | – | 0 |
| Valley City State | 1 | – | 5 | – | 0 | 1 | – | 7 | – | 0 |
| Ellendale | 0 | – | 6 | – | 0 | 0 | – | 7 | – | 0 |
$ – Conference champion

1961 Northern State College Conference football standings
| | Conf. | | | | | Overall |
| Team | W | | L | | T | W | | L | | T |
|---|---|---|---|---|---|---|---|---|---|---|
| Mankato State $ | 5 | – | 0 | – | 0 | 6 | – | 3 | – | 0 |
| Moorhead State | 3 | – | 2 | – | 0 | 5 | – | 4 | – | 0 |
| Bemidji State | 3 | – | 2 | – | 0 | 3 | – | 6 | – | 0 |
| Winona State | 2 | – | 2 | – | 1 | 4 | – | 3 | – | 1 |
| Michigan Tech | 1 | – | 4 | – | 0 | 1 | – | 6 | – | 1 |
| St. Cloud State | 0 | – | 4 | – | 1 | 1 | – | 6 | – | 1 |
$ – Conference champion

1961 Northwest Conference football standings
| | Conf. | | | | | Overall |
| Team | W | | L | | T | W | | L | | T |
|---|---|---|---|---|---|---|---|---|---|---|
| No. 3 Linfield $^ | 5 | – | 0 | – | 0 | 10 | – | 1 | – | 0 |
| Lewis & Clark | 3 | – | 2 | – | 0 | 6 | – | 3 | – | 0 |
| College of Idaho | 3 | – | 2 | – | 0 | 5 | – | 4 | – | 0 |
| Willamette | 3 | – | 2 | – | 0 | 4 | – | 4 | – | 0 |
| Whitman | 1 | – | 4 | – | 0 | 1 | – | 7 | – | 0 |
| Pacific (OR) | 0 | – | 5 | – | 0 | 0 | – | 9 | – | 0 |
$ – Conference champion; ^ – NAIA playoff participant; Rankings from NAIA poll

1961 Ohio Athletic Conference football standings
| | Conf. | | | | | Overall |
| Team | W | | L | | T | W | | L | | T |
|---|---|---|---|---|---|---|---|---|---|---|
| Wittenberg $ | 6 | – | 0 | – | 0 | 8 | – | 1 | – | 0 |
| Akron | 6 | – | 1 | – | 0 | 6 | – | 2 | – | 0 |
| Otterbein | 5 | – | 1 | – | 0 | 8 | – | 1 | – | 0 |
| Muskingum | 5 | – | 1 | – | 0 | 7 | – | 2 | – | 0 |
| Capital | 5 | – | 2 | – | 1 | 5 | – | 2 | – | 1 |
| Wooster | 5 | – | 3 | – | 0 | 6 | – | 3 | – | 0 |
| Ohio Wesleyan | 4 | – | 3 | – | 0 | 6 | – | 3 | – | 0 |
| Kenyon | 2 | – | 4 | – | 0 | 3 | – | 4 | – | 1 |
| Mount Union | 2 | – | 5 | – | 0 | 3 | – | 6 | – | 0 |
| Denison | 2 | – | 6 | – | 0 | 3 | – | 6 | – | 0 |
| Heidelberg | 1 | – | 4 | – | 1 | 1 | – | 7 | – | 1 |
| Oberlin | 1 | – | 5 | – | 0 | 2 | – | 5 | – | 1 |
| Hiram | 1 | – | 5 | – | 0 | 1 | – | 7 | – | 0 |
| Marietta | 0 | – | 5 | – | 1 | 0 | – | 8 | – | 1 |
$ – Conference champion

1961 Ohio Valley Conference football standings
| | Conf. | | | | | Overall |
| Team | W | | L | | T | W | | L | | T |
|---|---|---|---|---|---|---|---|---|---|---|
| Tennessee Tech $ | 6 | – | 0 | – | 0 | 7 | – | 3 | – | 0 |
| Middle Tennessee | 5 | – | 1 | – | 0 | 7 | – | 3 | – | 0 |
| Western Kentucky | 4 | – | 2 | – | 0 | 6 | – | 3 | – | 0 |
| Eastern Kentucky | 3 | – | 3 | – | 0 | 4 | – | 5 | – | 0 |
| Murray State | 2 | – | 4 | – | 0 | 4 | – | 6 | – | 0 |
| East Tennessee State | 1 | – | 5 | – | 0 | 3 | – | 7 | – | 0 |
| Morehead State | 0 | – | 6 | – | 0 | 1 | – | 6 | – | 1 |
$ – Conference champion

1961 Oklahoma Collegiate Conference football standings
| | Conf. | | | | | Overall |
| Team | W | | L | | T | W | | L | | T |
|---|---|---|---|---|---|---|---|---|---|---|
| No. 9 Central State (OK) + | 6 | – | 1 | – | 0 | 9 | – | 1 | – | 0 |
| Langston + | 6 | – | 1 | – | 0 | 8 | – | 2 | – | 0 |
| No. 11 Panhandle A&M | 4 | – | 1 | – | 0 | 9 | – | 2 | – | 0 |
| East Central | 3 | – | 4 | – | 0 | 5 | – | 5 | – | 0 |
| SE Oklahoma State | 2 | – | 4 | – | 0 | 4 | – | 6 | – | 0 |
| Northeastern State | 2 | – | 4 | – | 0 | 3 | – | 6 | – | 0 |
| SW Oklahoma State | 2 | – | 5 | – | 0 | 2 | – | 8 | – | 0 |
| NW Oklahoma State | 1 | – | 6 | – | 0 | 1 | – | 8 | – | 0 |
$ – Conference champion; Rankings from NAIA poll

1961 Oregon Collegiate Conference football standings
| | Conf. | | | | | Overall |
| Team | W | | L | | T | W | | L | | T |
|---|---|---|---|---|---|---|---|---|---|---|
| Southern Oregon $ | 4 | – | 0 | – | 0 | 5 | – | 4 | – | 0 |
| Oregon College of Education | 2 | – | 1 | – | 1 | 4 | – | 3 | – | 1 |
| Portland State | 2 | – | 2 | – | 0 | 3 | – | 5 | – | 0 |
| Oregon Tech | 1 | – | 2 | – | 1 | 4 | – | 4 | – | 1 |
| Eastern Oregon | 0 | – | 4 | – | 0 | 1 | – | 7 | – | 0 |
$ – Conference champion

1961 Pennsylvania State College Conference football standings
| | Conf. | | | | | Overall |
| Team | W | | L | | T | W | | L | | T |
|---|---|---|---|---|---|---|---|---|---|---|
East Division
| No. 20 West Chester xy$ | 4 | – | 0 | – | 0 | 7 | – | 2 | – | 0 |
| East Stroudsburg | 5 | – | 1 | – | 0 | 7 | – | 1 | – | 0 |
| Bloomsburg | 2 | – | 2 | – | 0 | 4 | – | 4 | – | 0 |
| Millersville | 2 | – | 3 | – | 0 | 5 | – | 3 | – | 0 |
| Mansfield | 2 | – | 3 | – | 0 | 4 | – | 4 | – | 0 |
| Kutztown | 2 | – | 3 | – | 0 | 2 | – | 6 | – | 0 |
| Cheyney | 0 | – | 5 | – | 0 | 0 | – | 7 | – | 1 |
West Division
| Slippery Rock xy | 4 | – | 1 | – | 0 | 6 | – | 3 | – | 0 |
| California (PA) | 4 | – | 1 | – | 1 | 5 | – | 2 | – | 1 |
| Clarion | 3 | – | 2 | – | 1 | 4 | – | 3 | – | 1 |
| Lock Haven | 2 | – | 2 | – | 1 | 5 | – | 2 | – | 2 |
| Edinboro | 1 | – | 3 | – | 1 | 3 | – | 4 | – | 1 |
| Indiana (PA) | 1 | – | 4 | – | 0 | 2 | – | 7 | – | 0 |
| Shippensburg | 0 | – | 4 | – | 0 | 0 | – | 8 | – | 0 |
Championship: West Chester 21, Slippery Rock 0
$ – Conference champion; x – Division champion/co-champions; y – Championship game participant; Edinboro forfeited to Clarion.; Rankings from NAIA poll

1961 Prairie College Conference football standings
| | Conf. | | | | | Overall |
| Team | W | | L | | T | W | | L | | T |
|---|---|---|---|---|---|---|---|---|---|---|
| Principia + | 1 | – | 0 | – | 1 | 3 | – | 3 | – | 2 |
| Illinois College + | 1 | – | 0 | – | 1 | 2 | – | 4 | – | 2 |
| Rose Poly | 0 | – | 2 | – | 0 | 0 | – | 8 | – | 0 |
+ – Conference co-champions

1961 Presidents' Athletic Conference football standings
| | Conf. | | | | | Overall |
| Team | W | | L | | T | W | | L | | T |
|---|---|---|---|---|---|---|---|---|---|---|
| Allegheny $ | 5 | – | 1 | – | 0 | 6 | – | 1 | – | 0 |
| John Carroll | 4 | – | 1 | – | 0 | 5 | – | 2 | – | 0 |
| Western Reserve | 5 | – | 2 | – | 0 | 5 | – | 2 | – | 0 |
| Case Tech | 4 | – | 2 | – | 0 | 4 | – | 3 | – | 0 |
| Bethany (WV) | 2 | – | 4 | – | 0 | 2 | – | 5 | – | 0 |
| Thiel | 2 | – | 4 | – | 0 | 2 | – | 4 | – | 0 |
| Wayne State (MI) | 1 | – | 4 | – | 0 | 1 | – | 5 | – | 0 |
| Washington & Jefferson | 0 | – | 5 | – | 0 | 0 | – | 7 | – | 0 |
$ – Conference champion

1961 Rocky Mountain Conference football standings
| | Conf. | | | | | Overall |
| Team | W | | L | | T | W | | L | | T |
|---|---|---|---|---|---|---|---|---|---|---|
| Adams State $ | 4 | – | 0 | – | 0 | 8 | – | 2 | – | 0 |
| Colorado College | 2 | – | 2 | – | 0 | 5 | – | 3 | – | 1 |
| Western State (CO) | 2 | – | 2 | – | 0 | 4 | – | 5 | – | 0 |
| Colorado Mines | 2 | – | 2 | – | 0 | 3 | – | 6 | – | 0 |
| Colorado State–Greeley | 0 | – | 4 | – | 0 | 1 | – | 9 | – | 0 |
$ – Conference champion

1961 South Dakota Intercollegiate Conference football standings
| | Conf. | | | | | Overall |
| Team | W | | L | | T | W | | L | | T |
|---|---|---|---|---|---|---|---|---|---|---|
| No. 6 Northern State $^ | 6 | – | 0 | – | 0 | 9 | – | 1 | – | 0 |
| Huron | 5 | – | 1 | – | 0 | 7 | – | 2 | – | 0 |
| Southern State (SD) | 4 | – | 2 | – | 0 | 6 | – | 3 | – | 0 |
| South Dakota Tech | 2 | – | 4 | – | 0 | 3 | – | 5 | – | 0 |
| Black Hills | 2 | – | 4 | – | 0 | 3 | – | 5 | – | 0 |
| Dakota Wesleyan | 2 | – | 4 | – | 0 | 2 | – | 7 | – | 0 |
| General Beadle | 0 | – | 6 | – | 0 | 2 | – | 7 | – | 0 |
$ – Conference champion; ^ – NAIA playoff participant; Rankings from NAIA poll

1961 Southeastern Athletic Conference football standings
| | Conf. | | | | | Overall |
| Team | W | | L | | T | W | | L | | T |
|---|---|---|---|---|---|---|---|---|---|---|
| Edward Waters $ | 5 | – | 0 | – | 0 | 8 | – | 1 | – | 0 |
| Albany State | 3 | – | 2 | – | 0 | 6 | – | 3 | – | 0 |
| Claflin | 3 | – | 2 | – | 0 | 5 | – | 3 | – | 1 |
| Savannah State | 2 | – | 2 | – | 1 | 4 | – | 4 | – | 1 |
| Morris | 1 | – | 3 | – | 1 | 3 | – | 5 | – | 2 |
| Paine | 0 | – | 5 | – | 0 | 0 | – | 6 | – | 0 |
$ – Conference champion

1961 Southern California Intercollegiate Athletic Conference football standings
| | Conf. | | | | | Overall |
| Team | W | | L | | T | W | | L | | T |
|---|---|---|---|---|---|---|---|---|---|---|
| No. 4 Whittier $^ | 4 | – | 0 | – | 0 | 9 | – | 1 | – | 0 |
| Redlands | 3 | – | 1 | – | 0 | 6 | – | 4 | – | 0 |
| Occidental | 2 | – | 2 | – | 0 | 6 | – | 3 | – | 0 |
| Pomona | 1 | – | 3 | – | 0 | 5 | – | 4 | – | 0 |
| Claremont-Mudd | 0 | – | 4 | – | 0 | 3 | – | 6 | – | 0 |
$ – Conference champion; ^ – NAIA playoff participant; Rankings from NAIA poll

1961 Southern Intercollegiate Athletic Conference football standings
| | Conf. | | | | | Overall |
| Team | W | | L | | T | W | | L | | T |
|---|---|---|---|---|---|---|---|---|---|---|
| No. 5 Florida A&M $ | 5 | – | 0 | – | 0 | 10 | – | 0 | – | 0 |
| Alabama A&M | 5 | – | 0 | – | 0 | 8 | – | 1 | – | 0 |
| Allen | 4 | – | 2 | – | 0 | 5 | – | 4 | – | 0 |
| Bethune–Cookman | 5 | – | 2 | – | 0 | 5 | – | 3 | – | 0 |
| Morris Brown | 4 | – | 2 | – | 0 | 5 | – | 4 | – | 0 |
| Fisk | 4 | – | 2 | – | 0 | 5 | – | 4 | – | 0 |
| Tuskegee | 4 | – | 1 | – | 1 | 4 | – | 4 | – | 1 |
| Morehouse | 3 | – | 3 | – | 0 | 4 | – | 4 | – | 0 |
| Clark (GA) | 2 | – | 3 | – | 1 | 3 | – | 3 | – | 2 |
| Lane | 1 | – | 4 | – | 0 | 2 | – | 5 | – | 1 |
| Benedict | 2 | – | 4 | – | 0 | 2 | – | 7 | – | 0 |
| South Carolina State | 2 | – | 5 | – | 0 | 2 | – | 7 | – | 0 |
| Alabama State | 1 | – | 5 | – | 0 | 1 | – | 7 | – | 0 |
| Knoxville | 1 | – | 5 | – | 0 | 1 | – | 7 | – | 0 |
| Fort Valley State | 0 | – | 5 | – | 0 | 0 | – | 9 | – | 0 |
$ – Conference champion; Standings were based on Dickinson System ratings.; Rankings from NAIA poll

1961 Southwestern Athletic Conference football standings
| | Conf. | | | | | Overall |
| Team | W | | L | | T | W | | L | | T |
|---|---|---|---|---|---|---|---|---|---|---|
| Jackson State $ | 6 | – | 1 | – | 0 | 9 | – | 2 | – | 0 |
| Grambling | 5 | – | 2 | – | 0 | 8 | – | 2 | – | 0 |
| Southern | 5 | – | 2 | – | 0 | 7 | – | 3 | – | 0 |
| Texas Southern | 5 | – | 2 | – | 0 | 6 | – | 3 | – | 0 |
| Prairie View A&M | 3 | – | 4 | – | 0 | 5 | – | 4 | – | 1 |
| Wiley | 2 | – | 4 | – | 1 | 4 | – | 4 | – | 1 |
| Arkansas AM&N | 1 | – | 5 | – | 1 | 3 | – | 6 | – | 1 |
| Texas College | 0 | – | 7 | – | 0 | 0 | – | 9 | – | 0 |
$ – Conference champion

1961 Tri-State Conference football standings
| | Conf. | | | | | Overall |
| Team | W | | L | | T | W | | L | | T |
|---|---|---|---|---|---|---|---|---|---|---|
| Midland $ | 5 | – | 1 | – | 0 | 6 | – | 2 | – | 0 |
| Dana | 4 | – | 2 | – | 0 | 5 | – | 3 | – | 0 |
| Westmar | 4 | – | 2 | – | 0 | 4 | – | 4 | – | 0 |
| Northwestern (IA) | 3 | – | 3 | – | 0 | 3 | – | 4 | – | 1 |
| Concordia (NE) | 2 | – | 4 | – | 0 | 3 | – | 6 | – | 0 |
| Yankton | 2 | – | 4 | – | 0 | 5 | – | 4 | – | 0 |
| Sioux Falls | 1 | – | 5 | – | 0 | 1 | – | 8 | – | 0 |
$ – Conference champion

1961 Virginia Little Eight Conference football standings
| | Conf. | | | | | Overall |
| Team | W | | L | | T | W | | L | | T |
|---|---|---|---|---|---|---|---|---|---|---|
| Emory and Henry * | 1 | – | 0 | – | 0 | 5 | – | 4 | – | 0 |
| Hampden–Sydney $ | 2 | – | 1 | – | 0 | 3 | – | 6 | – | 0 |
| Randolph–Macon | 1 | – | 1 | – | 0 | 4 | – | 5 | – | 0 |
| Bridgewater | 0 | – | 2 | – | 0 | 0 | – | 8 | – | 0 |
$ – Conference champion; * – Emory and Henry did not play enough conference games to be eligible for the championship.

1961 West Penn Conference football standings
| | Conf. | | | | | Overall |
| Team | W | | L | | T | W | | L | | T |
|---|---|---|---|---|---|---|---|---|---|---|
| Westminster (PA) $ | 4 | – | 1 | – | 0 | 6 | – | 2 | – | 0 |
| Grove City | 2 | – | 0 | – | 0 | 5 | – | 4 | – | 0 |
| Waynesburg | 2 | – | 2 | – | 0 | 6 | – | 2 | – | 0 |
| Saint Vincent | 2 | – | 2 | – | 0 | 3 | – | 3 | – | 1 |
| Geneva | 1 | – | 2 | – | 0 | 4 | – | 4 | – | 0 |
| Carnegie Tech | 0 | – | 4 | – | 0 | 1 | – | 7 | – | 0 |
$ – Conference champion

1961 West Virginia Intercollegiate Athletic Conference football standings
| | Conf. | | | | | Overall |
| Team | W | | L | | T | W | | L | | T |
|---|---|---|---|---|---|---|---|---|---|---|
Eastern Division
| Salem x | 6 | – | 2 | – | 0 | 6 | – | 3 | – | 0 |
| West Liberty State | 5 | – | 2 | – | 0 | 6 | – | 2 | – | 0 |
| Davis & Elkins | 1 | – | 5 | – | 0 | 2 | – | 5 | – | 0 |
| West Virginia State | 0 | – | 4 | – | 0 | 0 | – | 7 | – | 0 |
Western Division
| West Virginia Wesleyan x$ | 4 | – | 1 | – | 0 | 8 | – | 1 | – | 0 |
| Glenville State | 5 | – | 2 | – | 0 | 5 | – | 2 | – | 0 |
| Fairmont State | 4 | – | 4 | – | 0 | 4 | – | 5 | – | 0 |
| Concord | 3 | – | 4 | – | 0 | 5 | – | 4 | – | 0 |
| Potomac State | 1 | – | 3 | – | 0 | 2 | – | 3 | – | 0 |
| West Virginia Tech | 1 | – | 3 | – | 0 | 2 | – | 5 | – | 1 |
Non-qualifiers
| Bluefield State | 1 | – | 0 | – | 0 | 3 | – | 3 | – | 1 |
| Shepherd | 1 | – | 2 | – | 0 | 4 | – | 2 | – | 2 |
| Bethany (WV) | 0 | – | 1 | – | 0 | 2 | – | 5 | – | 0 |
$ – Conference champion; x – Division champion/co-champions; Conference standings based on power ratings

1961 Wisconsin State College Conference football standings
| | Conf. | | | | | Overall |
| Team | W | | L | | T | W | | L | | T |
|---|---|---|---|---|---|---|---|---|---|---|
| Stevens Point State $ | 7 | – | 1 | – | 0 | 8 | – | 1 | – | 0 |
| La Crosse State | 5 | – | 1 | – | 0 | 5 | – | 3 | – | 0 |
| River Falls State | 4 | – | 2 | – | 0 | 5 | – | 4 | – | 0 |
| Whitewater State | 3 | – | 3 | – | 0 | 6 | – | 3 | – | 0 |
| Superior State | 2 | – | 3 | – | 1 | 3 | – | 4 | – | 2 |
| Stout State | 2 | – | 3 | – | 1 | 3 | – | 4 | – | 1 |
| Eau Claire State | 3 | – | 5 | – | 0 | 4 | – | 5 | – | 0 |
| Oshkosh State | 2 | – | 4 | – | 0 | 2 | – | 4 | – | 0 |
| Milwaukee | 2 | – | 4 | – | 0 | 2 | – | 6 | – | 0 |
| Platteville State | 1 | – | 5 | – | 0 | 1 | – | 6 | – | 0 |
$ – Conference champion

1961 Yankee Conference football standings
| | Conf. | | | | | Overall |
| Team | W | | L | | T | W | | L | | T |
|---|---|---|---|---|---|---|---|---|---|---|
| Maine $ | 5 | – | 0 | – | 0 | 8 | – | 0 | – | 1 |
| UMass | 3 | – | 1 | – | 0 | 5 | – | 4 | – | 0 |
| Connecticut | 2 | – | 2 | – | 0 | 2 | – | 7 | – | 0 |
| New Hampshire | 1 | – | 3 | – | 0 | 3 | – | 5 | – | 0 |
| Rhode Island | 1 | – | 4 | – | 0 | 2 | – | 6 | – | 1 |
| Vermont | 0 | – | 2 | – | 0 | 3 | – | 3 | – | 1 |
$ – Conference champion

=== Independents ===
1961 Eastern college football independents records
| | Conf. | | | Overall |
| Team | W | L | T | W | | L | | T |
|---|---|---|---|---|---|---|---|---|
| Middlebury | | – | | 5 | – | 1 | – | 1 |
| Villanova | | – | | 8 | – | 2 | – | 0 |
| Southern Connecticut State | | – | | 7 | – | 2 | – | 0 |
| Alfred | | – | | 6 | – | 2 | – | 0 |
| Montclair State | | – | | 6 | – | 2 | – | 0 |
| Delaware Valley | | – | | 6 | – | 2 | – | 0 |
| No. 17 Penn State | | – | | 8 | – | 3 | – | 0 |
| No. 14 Syracuse | | – | | 8 | – | 3 | – | 0 |
| Trinity (CT) | | – | | 5 | – | 2 | – | 1 |
| Holy Cross | | – | | 7 | – | 3 | – | 0 |
| C. W. Post | | – | | 6 | – | 3 | – | 0 |
| Army | | – | | 6 | – | 4 | – | 0 |
| Merchant Marine | | – | | 6 | – | 4 | – | 0 |
| Tufts | | – | | 5 | – | 3 | – | 0 |
| Rochester | | – | | 5 | – | 3 | – | 0 |
| Hamilton | | – | | 4 | – | 3 | – | 0 |
| Cortland State | | – | | 4 | – | 3 | – | 0 |
| American International | | – | | 5 | – | 4 | – | 0 |
| Colgate | | – | | 5 | – | 4 | – | 0 |
| Northeastern | | – | | 4 | – | 4 | – | 0 |
| Coast Guard | | – | | 4 | – | 4 | – | 0 |
| Ithaca | | – | | 4 | – | 4 | – | 0 |
| Boston University | | – | | 4 | – | 5 | – | 0 |
| Buffalo | | – | | 4 | – | 5 | – | 0 |
| Bridgeport | | – | | 4 | – | 5 | – | 0 |
| Norwich | | – | | 3 | – | 4 | – | 1 |
| Worcester Tech | | – | | 3 | – | 4 | – | 0 |
| Boston College | | – | | 4 | – | 6 | – | 0 |
| Union (NY) | | – | | 3 | – | 5 | – | 0 |
| Pittsburgh | | – | | 3 | – | 7 | – | 0 |
| Nichols | | – | | 2 | – | 3 | – | 0 |
| Trenton State | | – | | 1 | – | 6 | – | 0 |
| King's (PA) | | – | | 1 | – | 8 | – | 0 |
| Springfield | | – | | 0 | – | 7 | – | 1 |
| Brockport | | – | | 0 | – | 7 | – | 0 |
| RPI | | – | | 0 | – | 7 | – | 0 |
| Hobart | | – | | 0 | – | 8 | – | 0 |
Rankings from AP Poll

1961 Midwestern college football independents records
| | Conf. | | | Overall |
| Team | W | L | T | W | | L | | T |
|---|---|---|---|---|---|---|---|---|
| Baldwin–Wallace | | – | | 9 | – | 0 | – | 0 |
| Wheaton (IL) | | – | | 8 | – | 0 | – | 0 |
| Earlham | | – | | 7 | – | 1 | – | 0 |
| St. Norbert | | – | | 7 | – | 2 | – | 0 |
| Northern Michigan | | – | | 6 | – | 2 | – | 0 |
| Hillsdale | | – | | 6 | – | 3 | – | 0 |
| Ferris Institute | | – | | 5 | – | 3 | – | 0 |
| Bradley | | – | | 6 | – | 4 | – | 0 |
| Xavier | | – | | 6 | – | 4 | – | 0 |
| Eureka | | – | | 3 | – | 2 | – | 1 |
| Detroit | | – | | 5 | – | 4 | – | 0 |
| Drake | | – | | 5 | – | 4 | – | 0 |
| Wabash | | – | | 5 | – | 4 | – | 0 |
| Youngstown | | – | | 4 | – | 4 | – | 1 |
| Notre Dame | | – | | 5 | – | 5 | – | 0 |
| Concordia (IL) | | – | | 4 | – | 4 | – | 0 |
| St. Mary of the Plains | | – | | 4 | – | 5 | – | 0 |
| North Park | | – | | 3 | – | 5 | – | 0 |
| William Penn | | – | | 3 | – | 5 | – | 1 |
| St. Procopius | | – | | 2 | – | 4 | – | 0 |
| Dayton | | – | | 2 | – | 8 | – | 0 |
| Elmhurst | | – | | 1 | – | 6 | – | 1 |
| Rose Poly | | – | | 0 | – | 8 | – | 0 |
| Washington University | | – | | 0 | – | 9 | – | 0 |

1961 Southern college football independents records
| | Conf. | | | Overall |
| Team | W | L | T | W | | L | | T |
|---|---|---|---|---|---|---|---|---|
| Washington and Lee | | – | | 9 | – | 0 | – | 0 |
| Tampa | | – | | 8 | – | 1 | – | 0 |
| Mississippi College | | – | | 8 | – | 1 | – | 0 |
| Mississippi Southern | | – | | 8 | – | 2 | – | 0 |
| Memphis State | | – | | 8 | – | 2 | – | 0 |
| Delta State | | – | | 7 | – | 2 | – | 1 |
| Howard (AL) | | – | | 7 | – | 2 | – | 0 |
| South Carolina Trade | | – | | 6 | – | 2 | – | 0 |
| Maryville (TN) | | – | | 6 | – | 2 | – | 0 |
| Sewanee | | – | | 5 | – | 2 | – | 1 |
| Miles | | – | | 5 | – | 2 | – | 0 |
| Navy | | – | | 7 | – | 3 | – | 0 |
| Arlington State | | – | | 7 | – | 3 | – | 0 |
| Louisville | | – | | 6 | – | 3 | – | 0 |
| Miami (FL) | | – | | 7 | – | 4 | – | 0 |
| McMurry | | – | | 6 | – | 4 | – | 0 |
| Houston | | – | | 5 | – | 4 | – | 1 |
| Livingstone | | – | | 5 | – | 4 | – | 0 |
| Southwestern (TN) | | – | | 4 | – | 4 | – | 0 |
| Emory & Henry | | – | | 4 | – | 4 | – | 0 |
| Florida State | | – | | 4 | – | 5 | – | 1 |
| Norfolk State | | – | | 3 | – | 4 | – | 0 |
| Abilene Christian | | – | | 4 | – | 6 | – | 0 |
| Chattanooga | | – | | 4 | – | 6 | – | 0 |
| Georgetown (KY) | | – | | 2 | – | 3 | – | 1 |
| Arkansas State | | – | | 3 | – | 6 | – | 0 |
| Austin | | – | | 2 | – | 7 | – | 0 |
| Trinity (TX) | | – | | 2 | – | 7 | – | 0 |
| Millsaps | | – | | 1 | – | 5 | – | 2 |
| Centre | | – | | 1 | – | 7 | – | 0 |

1961 Western college football independents records
| | Conf. | | | Overall |
| Team | W | L | T | W | | L | | T |
|---|---|---|---|---|---|---|---|---|
| No. 17 Arizona | | – | | 8 | – | 1 | – | 1 |
| Westminster (UT) | | – | | 7 | – | 1 | – | 1 |
| La Verne | | – | | 7 | – | 2 | – | 0 |
| Idaho State | | – | | 5 | – | 2 | – | 1 |
| San Francisco | | – | | 4 | – | 2 | – | 0 |
| Cal Poly Pomona | | – | | 6 | – | 3 | – | 0 |
| San Jose State | | – | | 6 | – | 4 | – | 0 |
| Eastern New Mexico | | – | | 6 | – | 4 | – | 0 |
| Los Angeles Pacific | | – | | 5 | – | 3 | – | 0 |
| Montana State | | – | | 4 | – | 3 | – | 1 |
| Pacific (CA) | | – | | 5 | – | 4 | – | 0 |
| Azusa | | – | | 4 | – | 3 | – | 0 |
| Oregon State | | – | | 5 | – | 5 | – | 0 |
| Santa Clara | | – | | 3 | – | 3 | – | 0 |
| Oregon | | – | | 4 | – | 6 | – | 0 |
| Claremont | | – | | 3 | – | 6 | – | 0 |
| Air Force | | – | | 3 | – | 7 | – | 0 |
| Washington State | | – | | 3 | – | 7 | – | 0 |
| Cal Western | | – | | 3 | – | 7 | – | 0 |
| Idaho | | – | | 2 | – | 7 | – | 0 |
| San Diego | | – | | 2 | – | 8 | – | 0 |
| Southern California College | | – | | 1 | – | 5 | – | 0 |
| UC Riverside | | – | | 1 | – | 7 | – | 0 |
| Pepperdine | | – | | 1 | – | 9 | – | 0 |

1961 NAIA independents football records
| | Conf. | | | Overall |
| Team | W | L | T | W | | L | | T |
|---|---|---|---|---|---|---|---|---|
| No. 2 Baldwin–Wallace | | – | | 9 | – | 0 | – | 0 |
| No. 8 Tampa | | – | | 8 | – | 1 | – | 0 |
| Westminster (UT) | | – | | 7 | – | 1 | – | 1 |
| Earlham | | – | | 7 | – | 1 | – | 0 |
| Oklahoma Panhandle State | | – | | 9 | – | 2 | – | 0 |
| La Verne | | – | | 7 | – | 2 | – | 0 |
| Hillsdale | | – | | 6 | – | 3 | – | 0 |
| Eastern New Mexico | | – | | 6 | – | 4 | – | 0 |
| McMurry | | – | | 6 | – | 4 | – | 0 |
| St. Mary of the Plains | | – | | 4 | – | 5 | – | 0 |
| Georgetown (KY) | | – | | 2 | – | 3 | – | 1 |
| Austin | | – | | 2 | – | 7 | – | 0 |
Rankings from NAIA poll

== Rankings ==
=== Major college polls ===
==== Tracking No. 1 spot ====
| Week | No. 1 Team | Event |
|---|---|---|
| Preseason | Iowa | |
| 1 (Sep 23) | IOWA | Did not play |
| 2 (Sep 30) | Iowa | Iowa 28, California 7 |
| 3 (Oct 7) | Iowa | Iowa 35, USC 34 |
| 4 (Oct 14) | Ole Miss | Ole Miss 47, Houston 7 |
| 5 (Oct 21) | Michigan State | MSU 17, Notre Dame 7 |
| 6 (Oct 28) | Michigan State | MSU 35, Indiana 0 |
| 7 (Nov 4) | Michigan State | Minnesota 13, MSU 0 |
| 8 (Nov 11) | Texas | Texas 33, Baylor 7 |
| 9 (Nov 18) | Texas | TCU 6, Texas 0 |
| 10 (Nov 25) | Alabama | (Idle) |
| 11 (Dec 2) | Alabama | Alabama 34, Auburn 0 |

==== Final polls ====
AP writers poll
| Rank | Team | 1st | Points |
|---|---|---|---|
| 1 | Alabama (11–0) | 26 | 452 |
| 2 | Ohio State (8–0–1) | 20 | 436 |
| 3 | Texas (10–1) | | 348 |
| 4 | LSU (10–1) | 1 | 335 |
| 5 | Ole Miss (9–2) | 1 | 284 |
| 6 | Minnesota (8–2) | | 225 |
| 7 | Colorado (9–2) | | 171 |
| 8 | Michigan State (7–2) | | 128 |
| 9 | Arkansas (8–3 ) | | 105 |
| 10 | Utah State (9–1–1) | | 33 |

UPI coaches poll
| Rank | Team | 1st | Points |
|---|---|---|---|
| 1 | Alabama | 18 | 318 |
| 2 | Ohio State | 15 | 311 |
| 3 | LSU | | 239 |
| 4 | Texas | | 237 |
| 5 | Ole Miss | | 219 |
| 6 | Minnesota | | 163 |
| 7 | Colorado | 1 | 124 |
| 8 | Arkansas | | 91 |
| 9 | Michigan State | | 76 |
| 10 | Utah State | | 28 |
| 11 | Purdue (6–3) | | 11 |
| 11 | Missouri (7–2–1) | | 11 |
| 13 | Georgia Tech (7–4) | | 16 |
| 14 | Duke (7–3) | | 11 |
| 15 | Kansas (7–3–1) | | 10 |
| 16 | Syracuse (8–3) | | 8 |
| 17 | Wyoming (6–1–2) | | 7 |
| 18 | Wisconsin (6–3) | | 6 |
| 19 | Miami (FL) (7–4) | | 4 |
| 19 | Penn State (8–3) | | 4 |

=== Small college polls ===
In 1961, both United Press International (UPI) and the Associated Press (AP) conducted "small college" polls. The number one selection of both wire services was the Pittsburg State Gorillas, who compiled a regular season record of 9–0 while outscoring opponents 299–25 and registering seven shutouts. The Gorillas went on to win two NAIA postseason games and finished 11–0 for the season.

United Press International (coaches) final poll
Published on November 22

| Rank | School | Record | No. 1 votes | Total points |
|---|---|---|---|---|
| 1 | Pittsburg State | 9–0 | 14 | 250 |
| 2 | Baldwin–Wallace | 8–0† | 1 | 179 |
| 3 | Mississippi Southern | 7–2 | 4 | 163 |
| 4 | Southeastern Louisiana | 9–1 | | 148 |
| 5 | Fresno State | 9–0 | 8 | 147 |
| 6 | Florida A&M | 8–0 | | 82 |
| 7 | Wheaton (IL) | 8–0 | | 68 |
| 8 | Whittier | 9–0 | | 59 |
| 9 | Butler | 9–0 | | 56 |
| 10 | Northern Michigan | 6–2 | | 55 |

†Baldwin–Wallace was 9–0 when the poll was taken.

Associated Press (writers) final poll
Published on November 22

| Rank | School | Record | No. 1 votes | Total points |
|---|---|---|---|---|
| 1 | Pittsburg State | 9–0 | 5 | 70 |
| 2 | Baldwin–Wallace | 9–0 | | 60 |
| 3 | Fresno State | 9–0 | | 46 |
| 4 | Florida A&M | 8–0 | | 42 |
| T5 | Whittier | 9–0 | | 34 |
| T5 | Lehigh | 7–2 | | 34 |
| 7 | Linfield | 9–0 | 1 | 26 |
| 8 | Southeastern Louisiana | 9–1 | | 21 |
| 9 | Lenoir–Rhyne | 7–1–1 | 1 | 16 |
| T10 | Butler | 9–0 | | 13 |
| T10 | Mississippi Southern | 7–2 | | 13 |

== Postseason ==
=== Major bowls ===
Monday, January 1, 1962

| Bowl | | | | |
|---|---|---|---|---|
| Sugar | No. 1 Alabama Crimson Tide | 10 | No. 9 Arkansas Razorbacks | 3 |
| Cotton | No. 3 Texas Longhorns | 12 | No. 5 Mississippi Rebels | 7 |
| Orange | No. 4 LSU Tigers | 25 | No. 7 Colorado Buffaloes | 7 |
| Rose | No. 6 Minnesota Golden Gophers | 21 | No. 16 UCLA Bruins | 3 |

=== Other bowls ===
| Bowl | Location | Date | Winner | Score | Loser |
|---|---|---|---|---|---|
| Sun | El Paso, TX | December 30 | Villanova | 17–9 | Wichita State |
| Gator | Jacksonville, FL | December 30 | No. 17 Penn State | 30–15 | No. 13 Georgia Tech |
| Tangerine | Orlando, FL | December 29 | Lamar Tech | 21–14 | Middle Tennessee |
| Bluebonnet | Houston, TX | December 16 | Kansas | 33–7 | No. 17 Rice |
| Liberty | Philadelphia, PA | December 16 | No. 14 Syracuse | 15–14 | Miami (FL) |
| Aviation | Dayton, OH | December 9 | New Mexico | 28–12 | Western Michigan |
| Gotham | New York, NY | December 9 | Baylor | 24–9 | No. 10 Utah State |
| Mercy | Los Angeles, CA | November 23 | Fresno State | 36–6 | Bowling Green |
| Mineral Water | Excelsior Springs, MO | November 25 | Kirksville State | 22–8 | Parsons |
| All-Sports | Oklahoma City, OK | December 9 | Panhandle A&M | 28–14 | Langston |
| West Virginia | | | West Virginia Wesleyan | 12–0 | Salem |
| Missile | Orlando, FL | December 9 | Fort Eustis | 25–24 | Quantico Marines |
| Orange Blossom | Miami, FL | December 9 | Florida A&M | 14–8 | Jackson State |

- Prior to the 1975 season, the Big Ten and AAWU (later Pac-8) conferences allowed only one postseason participant each, for the Rose Bowl.

=== NAIA postseason ===
The 1961 NAIA season culminated in the sixth annual NAIA Football National Championship, played at Hughes Stadium in Sacramento, California. During its three years in Sacramento, the game was called the Camellia Bowl (separate from the later Camellia Bowl played in Montgomery, Alabama).

Pittsburg State defeated Linfield in the championship game, 12–7, to win their second NAIA national title and first since 1957.

Semifinals; December 2, 1961
Whittier | 7
Linfield* | 18
Northern State | 14
Pittsburg State* | 28

Championship; December 9, 1961; Camellia Bowl
Linfield | 7
Pittsburg State | 12

== Award season ==
=== Heisman Trophy ===
The Heisman Trophy is given to the year's most outstanding player

| Player | School | Position | 1st | 2nd | 3rd | Total |
|---|---|---|---|---|---|---|
| Ernie Davis | Syracuse | HB | 179 | 103 | 81 | 824 |
| Bob Ferguson | Ohio State | FB | 122 | 156 | 93 | 771 |
| Jimmy Saxton | Texas | HB | 81 | 105 | 98 | 551 |
| Sandy Stephens | Minnesota | QB | 104 | 78 | 68 | 543 |
| Pat Trammell | Alabama | QB | 76 | 45 | 44 | 362 |
| Joe Romig | Colorado | G | 55 | 40 | 34 | 279 |
| John Hadl | Kansas | QB | 33 | 25 | 23 | 172 |
| Gary Collins | Maryland | E | 28 | 31 | 21 | 167 |
| Roman Gabriel | NC State | QB | 23 | 27 | 32 | 155 |
| Merlin Olsen | Utah State | DT | 13 | 19 | 16 | 93 |

=== All-Americans ===
For the year 1961, the NCAA recognizes six published All-American teams as "official" designations for purposes of its consensus determinations. The following chart identifies the NCAA-recognized consensus All-Americans and displays which first-team designations they received.

| Name | Position | School | Number | Official | Other |
|---|---|---|---|---|---|
| Roy Winston | Guard | LSU | 6/6 | AFCA, AP, FWAA, NEA, SN, UPI | CP, Time, WC |
| Ernie Davis | Halfback | Syracuse | 6/6 | AFCA, AP, FWAA, NEA, SN, UPI | CP, Time, WC |
| Bob Ferguson | Fullback | Ohio State | 6/6 | AFCA, AP, FWAA, NEA, SN, UPI | CP, Time, WC |
| Billy Neighbors | Tackle | Alabama | 6/6 | AFCA, AP, FWAA, NEA, SN, UPI | CP, WC |
| Jimmy Saxton | Halfback | Texas | 6/6 | AFCA, AP, FWAA, NEA, SN, UPI | CP, WC |
| Gary Collins | End | Maryland | 5/6 | AFCA, FWAA, NEA, SN, UPI | CP, Time, WC |
| Joe Romig | Guard | Colorado | 5/6 | AFCA, FWAA, NEA, SN, UPI | WC |
| Alex Kroll | Center | Rutgers | 5/6 | AFCA, AP, FWAA, NEA, UPI | WC |
| Sandy Stephens | Quarterback | Minnesota | 5/6 | AP, FWAA, NEA, SN, UPI | WC |
| Bill Miller | End | Miami (Fla.) | 4/6 | AP, FWAA, NEA, SN | Time, WC |
| Merlin Olsen | Tackle | Utah State | 4/6 | AP, FWAA, NEA, UPI | Time, WC |

=== Other awards ===
- Maxwell Award - Bob Ferguson, Ohio State
- Sammy Baugh Trophy - Ron Miller, Wisconsin
- Outland Trophy (best lineman) - Merlin Olsen, Utah State
- AFCA Coach of the Year Award - Bear Bryant, Alabama
- FWAA Coach of the Year Award - Darrell Royal, Texas

== Statistical leaders ==
=== Individual ===
==== Total offense ====
The following players were the individual leaders in total offense during the 1961 season:

Major college

| Rank | Player | Team | Games | Plays | Total Yds | PtR |
|---|---|---|---|---|---|---|
| 1 | Dave Hoppmann | Iowa State | 10 | 320 | 1638 | 80 |
| 2 | Pat McCarthy | Holy Cross | 10 | 283 | 1509 | 128 |
| 3 | Ron Miller | Wisconsin | 9 | 234 | 1449 | 86 |
| 4 | Chon Gallegos | San Jose State | 10 | 237 | 1388 | 100 |
| 5 | Eddie Wilson | Arizona | 10 | 181 | 1377 | 120 |
| 6 | John Furman | Texas Western | 10 | 255 | 1334 | 89 |
| 7 | Pat Trammell | Alabama | 10 | 208 | 1314 | 108 |
| 8 | Sandy Stephens | Minnesota | 9 | 252 | 1281 | 96 |
| 9 | Preacher Pilot | New Mexico State | 10 | 191 | 1278 | 138 |
| 10 | Jerry Gross | Detroit | 9 | 189 | 1250 | 69 |

Small college

| Rank | Player | Team | Games | Plays | Total Yds |
|---|---|---|---|---|---|
| 1 | Denny Spurlock | Whitworth | 10 | 224 | 1760 |
| 2 | Jan Lloyd | Occidental | 9 | 264 | 1750 |
| 3 | Tom Gryzwinski | Defiance | 8 | 314 | 1749 |
| 4 | Roy Curry | Jackson State | 10 | 258 | 1511 |
| 5 | Doug Olsen | Southern Oregon | 9 | 259 | 1464 |
| 6 | Halsey | Carthage | 9 | 181 | 1379 |
| 7 | Cavalli | Wagner | 9 | 229 | 1354 |
| 8 | Giles | Louisville | 9 | 208 | 1346 |
| 9 | Nunes | Slippery Rock | 9 | 221 | 1345 |
| 10 | Connors | Salem (WV) | 9 | 163 | 1333 |

==== Passing ====
The following players were the individual leaders in pass completions during the 1961 season:

Major college

| Rank | Player | Team | Games | Compl. | Att. | Pct. Compl. | Yds. | Int. | TDs |
|---|---|---|---|---|---|---|---|---|---|
| 1 | Chon Gallegos | San Jose State | 10 | 117 | 197 | .594 | 1480 | 13 | 14 |
| 2 | Ron Miller | Wisconsin | 9 | 104 | 198 | .525 | 1487 | 11 | 11 |
| 3 | Roman Gabriel | NC State | 10 | 99 | 186 | .532 | 987 | 6 | 8 |
| 4 | Ron Klemick | Navy | 10 | 86 | 183 | .470 | 1045 | 13 | 6 |
| 5 | Bill Canty | Furman | 10 | 84 | 168 | .500 | 884 | 12 | 8 |
| 6 | John Furman | Texas Western | 10 | 84 | 180 | .467 | 1026 | 10 | 10 |
| 7 | Matt Szykowny | Iowa | 9 | 79 | 139 | .568 | 1078 | 15 | 7 |
| 8 | Eddie Wilson | Arizona | 10 | 79 | 154 | .513 | 1294 | 7 | 10 |
| 9 | Pat McCarthy | Holy Cross | 10 | 76 | 165 | .461 | 1081 | 11 | 11 |
| 10 | Pat Trammell | Alabama | 10 | 75 | 133 | .564 | 1035 | 2 | 8 |

Small college

| Rank | Player | Team | Games | Compl. | Att. | Pct. Compl. | Yds. | Int. | TDs |
|---|---|---|---|---|---|---|---|---|---|
| 1 | Tom Gryzwinski | Defiance | 8 | 127 | 258 | .492 | 1684 | 17 | 14 |
| 2 | Jan Lloyd | Occidental | 9 | 122 | 234 | .521 | 1748 | 8 | 11 |
| 3 | Denny Spurlock | Whitworth | 10 | 115 | 189 | .608 | 1708 | 16 | 26 |
| 4 | Bill Thorp | Cornell (IA) | 9 | 108 | 199 | .543 | 1231 | 10 | 15 |
| 5 | Doug McClary | Pacific Lutheran | 105 | 208 | .505 | 966 | 19 | 4 | |
| 6 | Hermann | Bradley | 10 | 104 | 201 | .517 | 1372 | 12 | 15 |
| 7 | Doug Olsen | Southern Oregon | 9 | 103 | 195 | .528 | 1379 | 16 | 10 |
| 8 | Jim Kuplic | Beloit | 8 | 95 | 178 | .534 | 827 | 8 | 6 |
| 9 | Norm McKinley | Los Angeles Pacific | 9 | 93 | 156 | .596 | 1220 | 4 | 11 |
| 10 | Earl Little | Gettysburg | 9 | 90 | 172 | .523 | 797 | 10 | 4 |

==== Rushing ====
The following players were the individual leaders in rushing yards during the 1961 season:
Major college

| Rank | Player | Team | Games | Yds | Rushes | Avg |
|---|---|---|---|---|---|---|
| 1 | Preacher Pilot | New Mexico State | 10 | 191 | 1278 | 6.69 |
| 2 | Pete Pedro | West Texas State | 10 | 137 | 976 | 7.12 |
| 3 | Bob Ferguson | Ohio State | 9 | 202 | 938 | 4.64 |
| 4 | Dave Hoppmann | Iowa State | 10 | 229 | 920 | 4.02 |
| 5 | Jimmy Saxton | Texas | 10 | 107 | 846 | 7.91 |
| 6 | Ernie Davis | Syracuse | 10 | 150 | 823 | 5.49 |
| 7 | Tommy Larscheid | Utah State | 10 | 121 | 773 | 6.39 |
| 8 | Tom Campbell | Furman | 10 | 157 | 767 | 4.89 |
| 9 | Bobby Lee Thompson | Arizona | 10 | 103 | 752 | 7.30 |
| 10 | Earl Stoudt | Richmond | 10 | 162 | 704 | 4.35 |

Small college

| Rank | Player | Team | Games | Yds | Rushes | Avg |
|---|---|---|---|---|---|---|
| 1 | Bob Lisa | St. Mary's (KS) | 9 | 156 | 1082 | 6.94 |
| 2 | Nelson Guthrie | Winston-Salem | 9 | 194 | 1077 | 5.55 |
| 3 | Joe Iacone | West Chester | 9 | 170 | 1059 | 6.23 |
| 4 | Steve Beguin | Linfield | 9 | 163 | 1058 | 6.49 |
| 5 | Bob Roma | Wofford | 11 | 130 | 1054 | 8.11 |
| 6 | Dan Boals | Iowa State College | 9 | 162 | 1003 | |
| 7 | John Knight | Valparaiso | 9 | 158 | 998 | |
| 8 | Grill | Lewis & Clark | 9 | 162 | 960 | |
| 9 | Thorne | South Dakota State | 10 | 174 | 958 | |
| 10 | Hauser | Westminster (UT) | 9 | 139 | 943 | |

==== Receiving ====
The following players were the individual leaders in receptions during the 1961 season:

Major college

| Rank | Player | Team | Games | Receptions | Receiving Yards | Touchdowns |
|---|---|---|---|---|---|---|
| 1 | Hugh Campbell | Washington State | 10 | 53 | 723 | 5 |
| 2 | Pat Richter | Wisconsin | 9 | 47 | 817 | 8 |
| 3 | Bill Miller | Miami (FL) | 10 | 43 | 640 | 2 |
| 4 | Al Snyder | Holy Cross | 10 | 38 | 558 | 5 |
| 5 | Oscar Donahue | San Jose State | 10 | 35 | 527 | 5 |
| 6 | Larry Vargo | Detroit | 9 | 32 | 601 | 8 |
| 7 | Tom Hutchinson | Kentucky | 10 | 32 | 543 | 4 |
| 8 | Buddy Iles | TCU | 10 | 479 | 2 | |
| 9 | Gary Collins | Maryland | 10 | 30 | 428 | 4 |
| 10 | Royce Cassell | New Mexico State | 10 | 29 | 519 | 7 |
| 10 | Joe Borich | Utah | 10 | 29 | 486 | 5 |

Small college

| Rank | Player | Team | Games | Receptions | Receiving Yards | Touchdowns |
|---|---|---|---|---|---|---|
| 1 | Martin Baumhower | Defiance | 8 | 57 | 708 | 4 |
| 2 | Howard Hartman | Southern Oregon | 9 | 51 | 611 | 6 |
| 3 | Ken Fisher | Cornell (IA) | 8 | 46 | 402 | 6 |
| 4 | John Murio | Whitworth | 10 | 45 | 811 | 13 |
| 5 | Jerry Griffin | Louisiana Tech | 9 | 45 | 435 | 3 |
| 6 | Dean Mack | Beloit | 8 | 44 | 311 | 2 |
| 7 | Dave Bottemiller | Pacific Lutheran | 9 | 43 | 381 | 2 |
| 8 | Karl Finch | Cal Poly Pomona | 9 | 41 | 767 | 8 |
| 9 | Davis | Bethune-Cookman | 8 | 40 | 670 | 9 |
| 9 | Houtz | Pepperdine | 10 | 40 | 590 | 4 |
| 9 | Ed Burton | Chico State | 10 | 40 | 566 | 5 |

==== Scoring ====
The following players were the individual leaders in scoring during the 1961 season:

Major college

| Rank | Player | Team | Pts | TD | PAT | FG |
|---|---|---|---|---|---|---|
| 1 | Preacher Pilot | New Mexico State | 138 | 21 | 12 | 0 |
| 2 | Pete Pedro | West Texas State | 132 | 22 | 0 | 0 |
| 3 | Tom Larscheid | Utah State | 96 | 15 | 6 | 0 |
| 4 | Ernie Davis | Syracuse | 94 | 15 | 4 | 0 |
| 4 | Wendell Harris | LSU | 94 | 8 | 28 | 6 |
| 6 | Bobby Smith | UCLA | 85 | 10 | 16 | 3 |
| 7 | Bobby Thompson | Arizona | 82 | 13 | 4 | 0 |
| 8 | Nolan Jones | Arizona State | 77 | 8 | 20 | 3 |
| 9 | Butch Blume | Rice | 74 | 6 | 20 | 6 |
| 10 | Sam Mudie | Rutgers | 70 | 10 | 10 | 0 |
| 11 | Bob Ferguson | Ohio State | 68 | 11 | 2 | 0 |
| 12 | Earl Stoudt | Richmond | 67 | 9 | 10 | 1 |
| 13 | Carter | Memphis State | 65 | 4 | 38 | 1 |
| 14 | Tom Haggerty | Columbia | 62 | 10 | 2 | 0 |
| 15 | Greg Mather | Navy | 61 | 1 | 22 | 11 |
| 16 | Billy Ray Adams | Ole Miss | 60 | 10 | 0 | 0 |
| 17 | Paul Allen | BYU | 58 | 9 | 4 | 0 |
| 17 | Jim Turner | Utah State | 58 | 3 | 34 | 2 |

Small college

| Rank | Player | Team | Pts | TD | PAT | FG |
|---|---|---|---|---|---|---|
| 1 | John Murlo | Whitworth | 129 | 15 | 33 | 2 |
| 2 | Jerry Domescik | Millikin | 120 | 20 | 0 | 0 |
| 3 | John Nachtsheim | Minnesota Duluth | 112 | 17 | 10 | 0 |
| 4 | Steve Beguin | Linfield | 108 | 18 | 0 | 0 |
| 5 | Bobby Lisa | St. Mary's (KS) | 98 | 15 | 8 | |
| 6 | Frank Melos | Wagner | 96 | 14 | 12 | 0 |
| 7 | Fred Fugazzi | Missouri Valley | 92 | 15 | 2 | 0 |
| 7 | Bill Winter | St. Olaf | 92 | 14 | 8 | 0 |
| 9 | Jim Pribula | West Chester | 91 | 8 | 28 | 5 |
| 10 | Toby Barkman | East Stroudsburg | 90 | 15 | 0 | 0 |
| 10 | Dave Arends | Cornell (IA) | 90 | 15 | 0 | 0 |

=== Team ===
==== Total offense ====
The following teams were the leaders in total offense during the 1961 season:

Major college

| Rank | Team | Games played | Total plays | Yards gained | Yards per game |
|---|---|---|---|---|---|
| 1 | Ole Miss | 10 | 674 | 4187 | 418.7 |
| 2 | New Mexico State | 10 | 631 | 4009 | 400.9 |
| 3 | Utah State | 10 | 669 | 3911 | 391.1 |
| 4 | Texas | 10 | 700 | 3831 | 383.1 |
| 5 | Arizona | 10 | 588 | 3782 | 378.2 |
| 6 | Penn State | 10 | 706 | 3691 | 369.1 |
| 7 | Memphis State | 10 | 610 | 3690 | 369.0 |
| 8 | Ohio State | 9 | 612 | 3142 | 349.1 |
| 9 | Arizona State | 10 | 658 | 3353 | 335.3 |
| 10 | West Texas State | 10 | 575 | 3290 | 329.0 |

Small college

| Rank | Team | Games played | Total plays | Yards gained | Yards per game |
|---|---|---|---|---|---|
| 1 | Florida A&M | 9 | 531 | 3722 | 413.6 |
| 2 | Whitworth | 10 | 659 | 4078 | 407.8 |
| 3 | South Dakota State | 10 | 676 | 4061 | 406.1 |
| 4 | Wittenberg | 9 | 669 | 3608 | 400.9 |
| 5 | Linfield | 9 | 607 | 3549 | 394.3 |
| 6 | Cal Poly Pomona | 9 | 562 | 3528 | 392.0 |
| 7 | St. Mary's (KS) | 9 | 572 | 3504 | 389.3 |
| 8 | Lewis & Clark | 9 | 640 | 3484 | 387.1 |
| 9 | Carthage | 9 | 501 | 3482 | 386.9 |
| 10 | West Chester | 9 | 572 | 3409 | 378.8 |

==== Scoring offense ====
The following teams were the leaders in scoring offense during the 1961 season:

Major college

| Rank | Team | Points per game |
|---|---|---|
| 1 | Utah State | 38.7 |
| 2 | New Mexico State | 34.1 |
| 3 | Memphis State | 33.2 |
| 4 | Ole Miss | 32.6 |
| 5 | West Texas State | 30.9 |
| 6 | Texas | 29.1 |
| 7 | Arizona | 28.8 |
| 8 | Arizona State | 28.7 |
| 8 | Alabama | 28.7 |
| 10 | Rutgers | 27.3 |

==== Rushing offense ====
The following teams were the leaders in rushing offense during the 1961 season:

Major college

| Rank | Team | Yards per game |
|---|---|---|
| 1 | New Mexico State | 299.1 |
| 2 | Texas | 285.8 |
| 3 | Utah State | 281.8 |
| 4 | Ohio State | 271.9 |
| 5 | West Texas State | 247.5 |
| 6 | Wyoming | 245.0 |
| 7 | Michigan State | 237.2 |
| 8 | Bowling Green | 236.9 |
| 9 | Ole Miss | 236.0 |
| 10 | Memphis State | 234.1 |

Small college

| Rank | Team | Yards per game |
|---|---|---|
| 1 | Huron | 313.1 |
| 2 | Lewis & Clark | 287.9 |
| 3 | St. Mary's (KS) | 282.4 |
| 4 | Central State (OH) | 280.7 |
| 5 | Carthage | 278.4 |

==== Passing offense ====
The following teams were the leaders in passing offense during the 1961 season:

Major college

| Rank | Team | Yards per game |
|---|---|---|
| 1 | Wisconsin | 188.4 |
| 2 | Ole Miss | 182.7 |
| 3 | Detroit | 182.1 |
| 4 | Holy Cross | 162.5 |
| 5 | Washington State | 156.1 |
| 5 | San Jose State | 156.1 |
| 7 | Navy | 154.5 |
| 8 | Iowa | 146.6 |
| 9 | Maryland | 146.4 |
| 10 | Arizona | 145.6 |

Small college

| Rank | Team | Yards per game |
|---|---|---|
| 1 | Cal Poly Pomona | 244.1 |
| 2 | Defiance | 227.9 |
| 3 | Occidental | 202.9 |
| 4 | Bethune-Cookman | 185.0 |
| 5 | Whitworth | 174.2 |

==== Total defense ====
The following teams were the leaders in total defense during the 1961 season:

Major college

| Rank | Team | Games played | Total plays | Yards gained | Yards per game |
|---|---|---|---|---|---|
| 1 | Alabama | 10 | 524 | 1326 | 132.6 |
| 2 | Utah State | 10 | 512 | 1393 | 139.3 |
| 3 | Ole Miss | 10 | 527 | 1453 | 145.3 |
| 4 | Bowling Green | 9 | 460 | 1456 | 161.8 |
| 5 | Wyoming | 9 | 438 | 1511 | 167.9 |
| 6 | LSU | 10 | 564 | 1703 | 170.3 |
| 7 | Villanova | 9 | 470 | 1559 | 173.2 |
| 8 | Texas | 10 | 577 | 1761 | 176.1 |
| 9 | Missouri | 10 | 560 | 1769 | 176.9 |
| 10 | Arkansas | 10 | 548 | 1774 | 177.4 |

Small college

| Rank | Team | Games played | Total plays | Yards gained | Yards per game |
|---|---|---|---|---|---|
| 1 | Florida A&M | 9 | 429 | 768 | 85.3 |
| 2 | East Stroudsburg | 8 | 405 | 863 | 107.9 |
| 3 | John Carroll | 7 | 342 | 766 | 109.4 |
| 4 | Washington & Lee | 8 | 428 | 927 | 115.9 |
| 5 | Wittenberg | 9 | 479 | 1065 | 118.3 |
| 6 | Edward Waters | 9 | 438 | 1117 | 124.1 |
| 7 | Delta State | 10 | 514 | 1282 | 128.2 |
| 8 | J.C. Smith | 9 | 536 | 1157 | 128.6 |
| 9 | Washington & Lee | 9 | 482 | 1163 | 129.2 |
| 10 | Winona State | 8 | 405 | 1086 | 135.8 |

==== Scoring defense ====
The following teams were the leaders in scoring defense during the 1961 season:

Major college

| Rank | Team | Points per game |
|---|---|---|
| 1 | Alabama | 2.2 |
| 2 | Ole Miss | 4.0 |
| 3 | Bowling Green | 4.7 |
| 4 | LSU | 5.0 |
| 4 | Georgia Tech | 5.0 |
| 6 | Michigan State | 5.6 |
| 7 | Missouri | 5.7 |
| 8 | Texas | 5.9 |
| 9 | Miami (FL) | 7.0 |
| 10 | Memphis State | 7.5 |

==== Rushing defense ====
The following teams were the leaders in rushing defense during the 1961 season:

Major college

| Rank | Team | Yards per game |
|---|---|---|
| 1 | Utah State | 50.8 |
| 2 | Alabama | 55.0 |
| 3 | Villanova | 71.1 |
| 4 | LSU | 79.4 |
| 5 | Ole Miss | 80.4 |
| 6 | Minnesota | 84.3 |
| 7 | Bowling Green | 86.7 |
| 8 | Wyoming | 89.2 |
| 9 | Texas | 90.2 |
| 10 | Georgia Tech | 94.9 |

Small college

| Rank | Team | Yards per game |
|---|---|---|
| 1 | Florida A&M | 20.1 |
| 2 | John Carroll | 37.4 |
| 3 | Washington & Lee | 37.4 |
| 4 | Hampton Institute | 58.3 |
| 5 | Parsons | 58.4 |

==== Passing defense ====
The following teams were the leaders in passing defense during the 1961 season:

Major college

| Rank | Team | Yards per game |
|---|---|---|
| 1 | Penn | 56.9 |
| 2 | Yale | 58.1 |
| 3 | Arkansas | 62.9 |
| 4 | Ole Miss | 64.9 |
| 5 | Dartmouth | 65.7 |
| 6 | Columbia | 65.8 |
| 7 | USC | 66.6 |
| 8 | Brown | 66.7 |
| 9 | Oregon | 67.2 |
| 10 | Kansas State | 68.7 |

Small college

| Rank | Team | Yards per game |
|---|---|---|
| 1 | Westminster | 24.8 |
| 2 | Principia | 31.8 |
| 3 | Ursinus | 37.6 |
| 4 | Western Maryland | 40.3 |
| 5 | Middlebury | 43.3 |
