= 1961 Florida A&M Rattlers football team =

American college football season

1961 Florida A&M Rattlers football

Black college national champion SIAC champion

Orange Blossom Classic, W 14–8 vs. Jackson State
- Conference: Southern Intercollegiate Athletic Conference
- Record: 10–0 (5–0 SIAC)
- Head coach: Jake Gaither (17th season)
- Home stadium: Bragg Memorial Stadium

1961 Southern Intercollegiate Athletic Conference football standings
	Conf.					Overall
Team	W		L		T	W		L		T
No. 5 Florida A&M $	5	–	0	–	0	10	–	0	–	0
Alabama A&M	5	–	0	–	0	8	–	1	–	0
Allen	4	–	2	–	0	5	–	4	–	0
Bethune–Cookman	5	–	2	–	0	5	–	3	–	0
Morris Brown	4	–	2	–	0	5	–	4	–	0
Fisk	4	–	2	–	0	5	–	4	–	0
Tuskegee	4	–	1	–	1	4	–	4	–	1
Morehouse	3	–	3	–	0	4	–	4	–	0
Clark (GA)	2	–	3	–	1	3	–	3	–	2
Lane	1	–	4	–	0	2	–	5	–	1
Benedict	2	–	4	–	0	2	–	7	–	0
South Carolina State	2	–	5	–	0	2	–	7	–	0
Alabama State	1	–	5	–	0	1	–	7	–	0
Knoxville	1	–	5	–	0	1	–	7	–	0
Fort Valley State	0	–	5	–	0	0	–	9	–	0
$ – Conference champion; Standings were based on Dickinson System ratings.; Rankings from NAIA poll

The 1961 Florida A&M Rattlers football team was an American football team that represented Florida A&M University as a member of the Southern Intercollegiate Athletic Conference (SIAC) during the 1961 college football season. In their 17th season under head coach Jake Gaither, the Rattlers compiled a perfect 10–0 record, including a victory over Jackson State in the Orange Blossom Classic for the black college football national championship, and shut out six of ten opponents. The team was ranked No. 4 in the final AP small college poll and No. 6 in the final UPI coaches poll.

Center Curtis Miranda received first-team honors on the 1961 Little All-America college football team.

The team's statistical leaders included Robert Paremore with 376 rushing yards, 11 touchdowns and 66 points scored, Emory Collier with 742 passing yards, and Al Denson with 395 receiving yards.

The team played its home games at Bragg Memorial Stadium in Tallahassee, Florida.

== Schedule ==
Date	Opponent	Rank	Site	Result	Attendance	Source
September 30	at Benedict		Columbia, SC	W 52–0		
October 7	vs. Lincoln (MO)*		Phillips Field; Tampa, FL	W 49–6		
October 14	Morris Brown^{†}		Bragg Memorial Stadium; Tallahassee, FL	W 56–0		
October 21	Bethune–Cookman		Bragg Memorial Stadium; Tallahassee, FL (Florida Classic)	W 76–0		
October 28	at South Carolina State		State College Stadium; Orangeburg, SC	W 60–0		
November 4	at North Carolina A&T*	No. 7	World War Memorial Stadium; Greensboro, NC	W 32–12		
November 11	Allen	No. 6	Bragg Memorial Stadium; Tallahassee, FL	W 71–0		
November 18	Southern*	No. 5	Bragg Memorial Stadium; Tallahassee, FL	W 46–0		
November 25	Texas Southern*	No. 4	Bragg Memorial Stadium; Tallahassee, FL	W 48–7		
December 9	vs. Jackson State*	No. 4	Miami Orange Bowl; Miami, FL (Orange Blossom Classic)	W 14–8	47,791	
*Non-conference game; ^{†}Homecoming; Rankings from AP Poll released prior to the game; Source:
