= Pat McCarthy (American football) =

American football quarterback

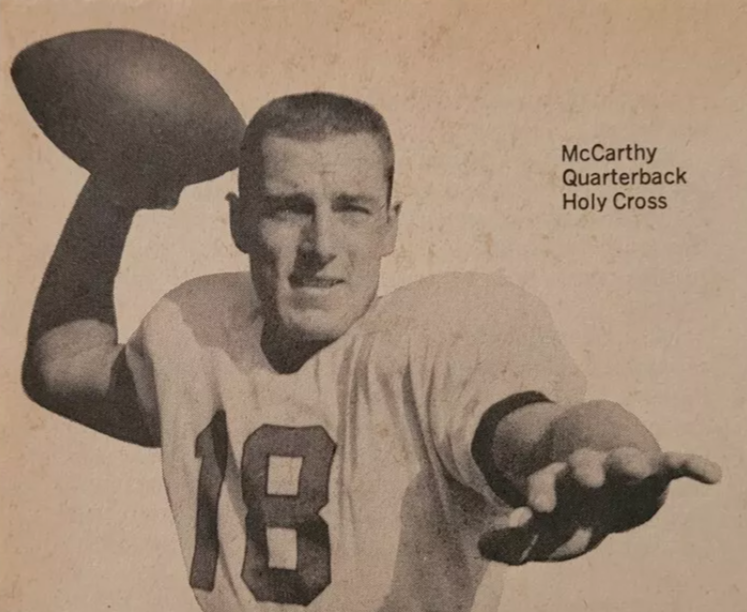
- Pat McCarthy, 1961

Profile
- Position: Quarterback

Personal information
- Born: c. 1939

Career information
- College: Holy Cross (1960–1962); Quantico Marines (1963–1964)

Patrick L. McCarthy (born c. 1939), or Lawrence Patrick McCarthy, is an American former football quarterback for the Holy Cross Crusaders. He was the Crusaders' starting quarterback on 1960, 1961, and 1962. As a sophomore in 1960, he won the Edward J. O'Melia Trophy after completing 15 of 22 passes for 247 yards against Boston College. As a junior in 1961, he ranked second in the country with 1,509 yards off total offense. He also set Holy Cross records for total offense in a season (1,721 yards in 1962) total offense in a career (4,534 yards). He also established NCAA records for two-point conversions scored (13) and two-point conversion passes (19). He was twice selected as an All-East player and received the 1961 Bulger Lowe Trophy as the best college football player in New England.

McCarthy grew up in Haverhill, Massachusetts. He played football and basketball at Lawrence Central Catholic High School. He was known as "Larry" during high school.

After graduating from Holy Cross, McCarthy joined the United States Marine Corps and played quarterback for the Quantico Marines Devil Dogs football team in 1963 and 1964. He also served three years in the Marines as an artillery officer in Vietnam.

McCarthy later served as the director of alumni relations at Holy Cross. He was inducted into the Holy Cross Varsity Club Hall of Fame in 1971.
