= 1961 Jackson State Tigers football team =

American college football season

1961 Jackson State Tigers football

SWAC champion

Orange Blossom Classic, L 8–14 vs. Florida A&M
- Conference: Southwestern Athletic Conference
- Record: 9–2 (6–1 SWAC)
- Head coach: John Merritt (10th season)
- Home stadium: Alumni Stadium

1961 Southwestern Athletic Conference football standings
	Conf.					Overall
Team	W		L		T	W		L		T
Jackson State $	6	–	1	–	0	9	–	2	–	0
Grambling	5	–	2	–	0	8	–	2	–	0
Southern	5	–	2	–	0	7	–	3	–	0
Texas Southern	5	–	2	–	0	6	–	3	–	0
Prairie View A&M	3	–	4	–	0	5	–	4	–	1
Wiley	2	–	4	–	1	4	–	4	–	1
Arkansas AM&N	1	–	5	–	1	3	–	6	–	1
Texas College	0	–	7	–	0	0	–	9	–	0
$ – Conference champion

The 1961 Jackson State Tigers football team represented Jackson College for Negro Teachers (now known as Jackson State University) as a member of the Southwestern Athletic Conference (SWAC) during the 1961 college football season. Led by tenth-year head coach John Merritt, the Tigers compiled an overall record of 9–2, with a conference record of 6–1, and finished as SWAC champion.

Back Roy Curry received third-team honors on the 1961 Little All-America college football team.

== Schedule ==
Date	Opponent	Site	Result	Attendance	Source
September 23	at Prairie View A&M	Blackshear Field; Prairie View, TX	W 20–14		
September 30	at Mississippi Vocational*	Magnolia Stadium; Itta Bena, MS	W 39–0		
October 7	at Arkansas AM&N	Pumphrey Stadium; Pine Bluff, AR	W 19–6		
October 14	Alcorn A&M^{†}	Alumni Stadium; Jackson, MS (rivalry)	W 28–20		
October 21	vs. Southern	Ladd Stadium; Mobile, AL (Claver Classic/rivalry)	L 7–17	8,000	
October 28	Grambling	Alumni Stadium; Jackson, MS	W 14–13	6,000	
November 4	Wiley	Alumni Stadium; Jackson, MS	W 20–0	3,500	
November 11	at Texas Southern	Jeppesen Stadium; Houston, TX	W 12–7		
November 18	at Texas College	Steer Stadium; Tyler, TX	W 78–0		
November 23	at Tennessee A&I*	Hale Stadium; Nashville, TN	W 12–6		
December 9	vs. No. 4 Florida A&M*	Miami Orange Bowl; Miami, FL (Orange Blossom Classic)	L 8–14	47,791	
*Non-conference game; ^{†}Homecoming; Rankings from Coaches' Poll released prior to the game
