= Grambling Stadium =

Stadium in Louisiana, United States

- Full name: Grambling Stadium
- Location: Grambling, Louisiana, United States
- Owner: Grambling State University
- Operator: Grambling State University
- Capacity: 18,000

Construction
- Closed: 1983

Tenant
- Grambling State Tigers football

Grambling Stadium was a stadium in Grambling, Louisiana, United States. It hosted the Grambling State University Tigers football team until the school moved to Eddie Robinson Stadium in 1983. The stadium held 18,000 people at its peak.

== See also ==
- Eddie Robinson Stadium
