= 1961 San Francisco State Gators football team =

American college football season

1961 San Francisco State Gators football

FWC co-champion
- Conference: Far Western Conference
- Record: 8–2 (4–1 FWC)
- Head coach: Vic Rowen (1st season)
- Home stadium: Cox Stadium

1961 Far Western Conference football standings
	Conf.					Overall
Team	W		L		T	W		L		T
No. 13/16 Humboldt State +	4	–	1	–	0	8	–	2	–	0
San Francisco State +	4	–	1	–	0	8	–	2	–	0
UC Davis	3	–	2	–	0	5	–	4	–	0
Nevada	2	–	3	–	0	5	–	4	–	0
Sacramento State	2	–	3	–	0	4	–	5	–	0
Chico State	0	–	5	–	0	4	–	6	–	0
+ – Conference co-champions; Rankings from NAIA poll and UPI small college poll

The 1961 San Francisco State Gators football team was an American football team that represented San Francisco State College (now known as San Francisco State University) as a member of the Far Western Conference (FWC) during the 1961 college football season. In their first year under head coach Vic Rowen, the Gators compiled an 8–2 record (4–1 in conference games), shared the FWC title with Humboldt State, and outscored opponents by a total of 261 to 102.

The team's statistical leaders included quarterback Dick Valdas (1,235 passing yards), halfback Tom Manney (561 rushing yards), and halfback Jesse Racines (396 receiving yards, 48 points scored).

The team played its home games at Cox Stadium in San Francisco.

== Schedule ==
Date	Opponent	Site	Result	Attendance	Source
September 16	UC Santa Barbara*	Cox Stadium; San Francisco, CA	W 59–0	2,500	
September 23	Long Beach State*	Cox Stadium; San Francisco, CA	W 14–9	5,500	
September 30	at Cal Poly Pomona*	L.A. State Stadium; Los Angeles, CA	W 26–19	3,000–4,200	
October 7	Humboldt State	Cox Stadium; San Francisco, CA	L 6–7	6,200	
October 14	at Los Angeles State*	L.A. State Stadium; Los Angeles, CA	L 21–28	3,750	
October 21	Nevada	Cox Stadium; San Francisco, CA	W 48–0	4,500	
October 28	UC Davis	Cox Stadium; San Francisco, CA	W 13–8	4,500	
November 4	at San Diego*	Torero Stadium; San Diego, CA	W 25–6	4,500	
November 11	at Sacramento State	Charles C. Hughes Stadium; Sacramento, CA	W 7–0	4,282	
November 18	at Chico State	College Field; Chico, CA	W 42–25	5,000	
*Non-conference game

== Statistics ==
The Gators tallied 3,098 yards of total offense (309.8 per game) consisting of 1,668 rushing yards (166.8 per game) and 1,430 passing games (143.0 per game). On defense, they gave up 2,039 yards (203.9 per game) including 1,153 rushing yards (115.3 per game) and 886 passing yards (88.6 per game).

Quarterback Dick Valois completed 88 of 156 passes for 1,235 yards with 15 touchdowns and 14 interceptions. Valois also led the team in total offense with 1,060 yards (a figure diminished by negative 175 rushing yards).

The team's rushing leaders were halfbacks Tom Manney (561 yards, 107 carries, 5.2-yard average) and Mike Jaramillo (505 yards, 84 carries, 6.0-yard average).

The leading receivers were halfback Jesse Racines (27 receptions, 396 yards, eight touchdowns) and end Jim Collopy (25 receptions, 319 yards, two touchdowns).

The leading scorers were halfbacks Jesse Racines (eight touchdowns, 48 points) and Tom Manney (seven touchdowns, 42 points).

George Moorhouse was the team's punter, kicking 42 times for an average of 38.7 yard per punt.

== Awards and honors ==
Eight San Francisco State players were selected as first-team players on the 1961 All-Far Western Conference football team:

- Dick Valois - quarterback (offense)
- Jesse Racines - halfback (offense)
- Jim Collopy - end (offense)
- Neil Loughlin - guard (offense)
- Ray Ponce - end (defense)
- Allan Abraham - guard (defense)
- Bill Baird - wingback (defense)
- John McGregor - halfback (defense)

Seven others were recognized on the second team:

- Bob Martin - end (offense)
- Mike Jaramillo - back (offense)
- Tom Manney - back (offense)
- Bob Burnette - fullback (offense)
- Ted Freeman - tackle (defense)
- Don Briemle - linebacker (defense)
- Lou Goins - halfback (defense)

Center Sam Dumas received honorable mention.

== Professional football ==
No San Francisco State players were selected in the 1962 NFL draft. Fullback Willie Simpson was not drafted, but appeared in 10 games for the 1962 Oakland Raiders.
