= 1961 Southern California Intercollegiate Athletic Conference football season =

- Sport: Football
- Number of teams: 5
- Champion: Whittier

Football seasons
- ← 1960

1961 Southern California Intercollegiate Athletic Conference football standings
	Conf.					Overall
Team	W		L		T	W		L		T
No. 4 Whittier $^	4	–	0	–	0	9	–	1	–	0
Redlands	3	–	1	–	0	6	–	4	–	0
Occidental	2	–	2	–	0	6	–	3	–	0
Pomona	1	–	3	–	0	5	–	4	–	0
Claremont-Mudd	0	–	4	–	0	3	–	6	–	0
$ – Conference champion; ^ – NAIA playoff participant; Rankings from NAIA poll

The 1961 Southern California Intercollegiate Athletic Conference football season was the season of college football played by the five member schools of the Southern California Intercollegiate Athletic Conference (SCIAC) as part of the 1961 college football season.

Whittier compiled a perfect 9–0 record in the regular season, won the SCIAC championship, and lost to Linfield in the semifinals of the NAIA playoffs. In the 1961 small college football rankings, Whittier was ranked No. 4 in the NAIA coaches poll, No. 5 in the Associated Press poll, and No. 8 in the United Press International poll.

== Teams ==
=== Whittier ===
1961 Whittier Poets football

SCIAC champion
- Conference: Southern California Intercollegiate Athletic Conference
- Record: 9–1 (4–0 SIAC)
- Head coach: John Godfrey (2nd season)

The 1961 Whittier Poets football team represented Whittier College of Whittier, California. In their second year under head coach John Godfrey, the Poets compiled a perfect 9–1 record (4–0 against SCIAC opponents) and won the SCIAC championship. In the 1961 small college football rankings, Whittier was ranked No. 4 in the NAIA coaches poll, No. 5 in the Associated Press poll, and No. 8 in the United Press International poll.

Quarterback Sei Miyano completed 63 of 115 passes for 1,154 yards with 15 touchdown passes and four interceptions. He also led the team with 1,291 yards of total offense. Halfback Dick Skinner led the team in rushing with 120 carries for 648 yards. Miyano was five feet, seven inches tall. He was one of four Japanese-American players on the 1961 Whittier team.

Three Whittier players were selected as first-team players on the 1961 All-SIAC football team: junior back Dick Skinner; junior end Stan Sanders; and senior guard Dave Okura.

Date	Opponent	Site	Result	Attendance	Source
September 16	San Diego*	Hadley Field; Whittier, CA	W 27–0		
September 23	at UC Santa Barbara*	La Playa Stadium; Santa Barbara, CA	W 20–0		
September 30	UC Davis*	Hadley Field; Whittier, CA	W 20–8		
October 7	vs. Pepperdine*	Sentinel Field; Inglewood, CA	W 28–11		
October 14	vs. Cal Western*	Hadley Field; Whittier, CA	W 46–12		
October 21	at Occidental	Eagle Rock, CA	W 28–8		
November 4	Pomona	Hadley Field; Whittier, CA	W 25–0		
November 11	at Claremont-Mudd	Claremont, CA	W 40–13		
November 18	Redlands	Hadley Field; Whittier, CA	W 24–6		
November 25	at Linfield*	McMinnville, OR (NAIA semifinal)	L 7–18		
*Non-conference game

=== Redlands ===
1961 Redlands Bulldogs football
- Conference: Southern California Intercollegiate Athletic Conference
- Record: 6–4 (3–1 SIAC)
- Head coach: Ted Runner (3rd season)

The 1961 Redlands Bulldogs football team represented University of Redlands of Redlands, California. In their third year under head coach Ted Runner, the Bulldogs compiled a 6–4 record (3–1 against SCIAC opponents) and finished second the SCIAC.

Four Redlands players were selected as first-team players on the 1961 All-SCIAC football team: senior quarterback Roger Chaney; senior tackle Myron Tarkanian; senior guard Marshall Nixon; and senior center Rollin Grider.

Date	Opponent	Site	Result	Attendance	Source
September 16	vs. Cal Western*	Point Loma High School; San Diego, CA	W 31–0		
September 23	Nevada*	U.R. stadium; Claremont, CA	W 25–0	3,000	
September 30	at Arizona State–Flagstaff*	Lumberjack Stadium; Flagstaff, AZ	L 10–13	3,500–4,450	
October 7	Cal Poly Pomona*	U.R. stadium; Claremont, CA	L 14–35	5,200	
October 14	San Diego State*	U.R. stadium; Claremont, CA	L 20–32	4,200	
October 21	Pomona^{†}	U.R. stadium; Claremont, CA	W 38–21	4,500	
October 28	at Claremont-Mudd	Claremont Field; Claremont, CA	W 26–7		
November 4	at Occidental	Eagle Rock, Los Angeles	W 27–19	5,000	
November 11	LaVerne*	U.R. stadium; Claremont, CA	W 40–28	4,000	
November 18	at Whittier	Hadley Field; Whittier, CA	L 6–24		
*Non-conference game; ^{†}Homecoming

=== Occidental ===
1961 Occidental Tigers football
- Conference: Southern California Intercollegiate Athletic Conference
- Record: 6–3 (2–2 SIAC)
- Head coach: Vic Schwenk (2nd season)

The 1961 Occidental Tigers football team represented Occidental College of Eagle Rock, Los Angeles. In their second year under head coach Vic Schwenk, the Tigers compiled a 6–2 record (2–2 against SCIAC opponents) and finished third in the SCIAC.

Three Occidental players were selected as first-team players on the 1961 All-SIAC team: junior back John Whitney; junior end Jerry Greenwalt; and senior tackle Mike Lewis.

Date	Opponent	Site	Result	Attendance	Source
September 23	Hamilton AFB*	Patterson Field; Eagle Rock, Los Angeles	L 14–20		
September 30	at Cal Western*	San Diego, CA	W 21–2		
October 7	at Santa Clara*	Santa Clara, CA	W 36–28		
October 13	Claremont-Mudd	Patterson Field; Eagle Rock, Los Angeles	W 61–0		
October 21	Whittier	Eagle Rock, CA	L 8–28		
October 28	at UC Santa Barbara*	La Playa Stadium; Santa Barbara, CA	W 14–13	6,000	
November 4	Redlands	Patterson Field; Eagle Rock, Los Angeles	L 19–27	5,000	
November 10	Caltech*	Patterson Field; Eagle Rock, Los Angeles	W 47–8	300	
November 18	at Pomona	Alumni Field; Pomona, CA	W 7–0		
*Non-conference game

=== Pomona ===
1961 Pomona Sagehens football
- Conference: Southern California Intercollegiate Athletic Conference
- Record: 5–4 (1–3 SIAC)
- Head coach: Chuck Mills (3rd season)

The 1961 Pomona Sagehens football team represented Pomona College of Claremont, California. In their third year under head coach Chuck Mills, the Sagehens compiled a 5–4 record (1–3 against SCIAC opponents) and finished fourth in the SCIAC. Senior back Pete Rodi was a first-team selection on the 1961 All-SCIAC team.

Date	Opponent	Site	Result	Attendance	Source
September 23	La Verne*	Alumni Field; Pomona, CA	L 28–37		
September 30	Azusa*	Claremont, CA	W 29–6		
October 7	Claremont-Mudd	Claremont, CA	W 8–6		
October 14	Caltech*	Claremont, CA	W 53–7		
October 21	Redlands		L 21–38	4,500	
October 28	at UC Riverside*	Riverside, CA	W 32–8		
November 4	Whittier	Hadley Field; Whittier, CA	L 0–25		
November 11	vs. Southern California College*	Newport Beach High School; Newport Beach, CA	W 40–0		
November 18	Occidental	Alumni Field; Pomona, CA	L 0–7		
*Non-conference game

=== Claremont-Mudd ===
1961 Claremont-Mudd Stags football
- Conference: Southern California Intercollegiate Athletic Conference
- Record: 3–6 (0–4 SIAC)
- Head coach: Jim Williams (1st season)

The 1961 Claremont-Mudd Stags football team represented Claremont College and Harvey Mudd College of Claremont, California. In their first year under head coach Jim Williams, the Stags compiled a 3–6 record (0–4 against SCIAC opponents) and finished last in the SCIAC.

Date	Opponent	Site	Result	Attendance	Source
September 23	El Toro Marines	Claremont, CA	L 20–27		
September 30	La Verne*	Claremont, CA	L 12–28		
October 7	Pomona	Claremont, CA	L 6–8		
October 13	at Occidental	Patterson Field; Eagle Rock, Los Angeles	L 0–61		
October 21	UC Riverside	Claremont, CA	W 21–14		
October 28	Redlands	Claremont Field; Claremont, CA	L 7–26		
November 4	Cal Western*	Claremont, CA	W 20–12		
November 11	Whittier	Claremont, CA	L 13–40		
November 18	at Caltech	Rose Bowl; Pasadena, CA	W 60–8		
*Non-conference game

== All-conference selections ==
At the end of the season, the conference coaches selected the best players at each position to their 1961 all-SIAC football team.

First team

- Quarterback - Roger Chaney, senior, Redlands
- Backs - John Whitney, junior, Occidental; Pete Rodi, senior, Pomona; Dick Skinner, junior, Whittier
- Ends - Jerry Greenwalt, junior, Occidental, and Stan Sanders Jr., Whittier
- Tackles - Myron Tarkanian, senior, Redlands; Mike Lewis, senior, Occidental
- Guards - Dave Okura, senior, Whittier; Marshall Nixon, senior, Redlands
- Center - Rollin Grider, senior, Redlands
