= 1961 Central Intercollegiate Conference football season =

- Sport: Football
- Number of teams: 6
- Champion: Pittsburg State

Football seasons
- ← 1960 1962 →

1961 Central Intercollegiate Conference football standings
	Conf.					Overall
Team	W		L		T	W		L		T
No. 1/1 Pittsburg State $^	5	–	0	–	0	11	–	0	–	0
Omaha	4	–	1	–	0	6	–	3	–	0
Fort Hays State	3	–	2	–	0	4	–	4	–	1
St. Benedict's	2	–	3	–	0	2	–	7	–	0
Emporia State	1	–	4	–	0	1	–	8	–	0
Washburn	0	–	5	–	0	3	–	6	–	0
$ – Conference champion; ^ – NAIA playoff participant; Rankings from NAIA poll and AP small college poll

The 1961 Central Intercollegiate Conference football season was the season of college football played by the six member schools of the Central Intercollegiate Conference (CIC) as part of the 1961 college football season.

The 1961 Pittsburg State Gorillas football team compiled a perfect 11–0 record, including a victory over Linfield in the Camellia Bowl to secure the NAIA national championship.

== Teams ==
=== Pittsburg State ===
1961 Pittsburg State Gorillas football

NAIA national champion; AP small college national champion; UPI small college national champion; CIC champion

Camellia Bowl, W 12–7 vs. Linfield
- Conference: Central Intercollegiate Conference
- Record: 11–0 (5–0 CIC)
- Head coach: Carnie Smith (13th season)
- Home stadium: Brandenburg Stadium

The 1961 Pittsburg State Gorillas football team compiled an 11–0 record, shut out seven of eleven opponents, and won the NAIA football national championship, the AP and UPI small college national championship, and the CIC championship.

=== Omaha ===
1961 Omaha Indians football
- Conference: Central Intercollegiate Conference
- Record: 6–3 (4–1 CIC)
- Head coach: Al Caniglia (2nd season)

The 1961 Omaha Indians football team was an American football team that represented the University of Omaha (now known as University of Nebraska Omaha of Omaha, Nebraska during the 1961 college football season. In their second season under head coach Al Caniglia, the team compiled an 6–3 record (4–1 against CIC opponents) and finished in second place in the CIC.

End Paul Blazevich received second-team honors on the 1961 Little All-America college football team.

Date	Opponent	Site	Result	Attendance	Source
September 16	Morningside*	Omaha, NE	W 32–6	5,100	
September 23	Colorado State–Greeley*	Omaha, NE	W 27–6	2,900	
September 30	at Colorado Mines*	Golden, CO	L 12–13		
October 14	at Fort Hays State	Hays, KS	W 26–0		
October 21	at Emporia State	Emporia, KS	W 27–21		
October 28	St. Benedict's	Omaha, NE	W 33–14	4,700–5,200	
November 4	Washburn	Omaha, NE	W 27–10	1,900	
November 11	at No. 1 Pittsburg State	Pittsburg, KS	L 18–34		
November 18	Drake	Omaha, NE	L 13–36	1,800–2,400	
*Non-conference game; Rankings from AP Poll released prior to the game

=== Fort Hays State ===
1961 Fort Hays State Tigers football
- Conference: Central Intercollegiate Conference
- Record: 4–4–1 (3–2 CIC)
- Head coach: Wayne J. McConnell (6th season)

The 1961 Fort Hays State Tigers football team was an American football team that represented Fort Hays State University of Hays, Kansas during the 1961 college football season. In their sixth season under head coach Wayne J. McConnell, the team compiled a 4–4–1 record (3–2 against CIC opponents) and finished in third place in the CIC.

Date	Opponent	Site	Result	Attendance	Source
September 16	Kearney State*	Hays, KS	W 24–0		
September 23	at Northwest Missouri State*	Maryville, MO	L 16–17		
September 30	at Colorado College*	Washburn Field; Colorado Springs, CO	L 6–14	1,000	
October 7	Eastern New Mexico*	Hays, KS	T 19–19		
October 14	Omaha	Hays, KS	L 0–26		
October 21	at No. 1 Pittsburg State	Pittsburg, KS	L 7–41		
October 28	Emporia State^{†}	Hays, KS	W 12–7		
November 4	St. Benedict's	Hays, KS	W 21–14		
November 10	at Washburn	Topeka, KS	W 14–7		
*Non-conference game; ^{†}Homecoming; Rankings from AP Poll released prior to the game

=== St. Benedict's ===
1961 St. Benedict's Ravens football
- Conference: Central Intercollegiate Conference
- Record: 2–7 (2–3 CIC)
- Head coach: Ivan Schottel (9th season)

The 1961 St. Benedict's Ravens football team represented St. Benedict's College (later renamed Benedictine College) of Atchison, Kansas, during the 1961 college football season. In their ninth season under head coach Ivan Schottel, the team compiled a 2–7 record (2–3 against CIC opponents) and finished in fourth place in the CIC.

Date	Opponent	Site	Result	Attendance	Source
September 23	at Hillsdale*	Hillsdale, MI	L 0–20		
September 30	Southeast Missouri State*	Amelia Earhart Field; Atchison, KS	L 0–14		
October 7	Southwest Missouri State*	Amelia Earhart Field; Atchison, KS	L 0–7		
October 14	at No. 4 Pittsburg State	Pittsburg, KS	L 0–26		
October 21	Washburn	Amelia Earhart Field; Atchison, KS	W 25–14		
October 28	at Omaha	Omaha, NE	L 14–33	4,700–5,200	
November 4	at Fort Hays State	Lewis Field; Hays, KS	L 14–21		
November 11	Emporia State	Amelia Earhart Field; Atchison, KS	W 19–0		
November 18	William Jewell*		L 14–34		
*Non-conference game; Rankings from AP Poll released prior to the game

=== Emporia State ===
1961 Emporia State Hornets football
- Conference: Central Intercollegiate Conference
- Record: 1–8 (1–4 CIC)
- Head coach: Keith Caywood (7th season)

The 1961 Emporia State Hornets football team represented Emporia State University of Emporia, Kansas, during the 1946 college football season. In their seventh season under head coach Keith Caywood, the team compiled a 1–8 record (1–4 against CIC opponents) and finished in fifth place in the CIC.

Date	Opponent	Site	Result	Attendance	Source
September 16	at Lincoln (MO)*	Jefferson City, MO	L 16–22		
September 23	at Southwest Missouri State*	Springfield, MO	L 12–19		
September 30	Central State (OK)*	Emporia, KS	L 7–27		
October 7	at Central Missouri State*	Warrensburg, MO	L 7–12		
October 14	Washburn	Emporia, KS	W 26–10		
October 21	Omaha	Emporia, KS	L 21–27		
October 28	Fort Hays State	Hays, KS	L 7–12		
November 4	No. 1 Pittsburg State	Emporia, KS	L 0–35		
November 11	St. Benedict's	Amelia Earhart Field; Atchison, KS	L 0–19		
*Non-conference game; Rankings from AP Poll released prior to the game

=== Washburn ===
1961 Washburn Ichabods football
- Conference: Central Intercollegiate Conference
- Record: 3–6 (0–5 CIC)
- Head coach: Ralph Brown (3rd season)

The 1961 Washburn Ichabods football team represented Washburn University of Topeka, Kansas, during the 1961 college football season. In their third season under head coach Ralph Brown, the team compiled an 3–6 record (0–5 against CIC opponents) and finished in last place in the CIC.

Date	Opponent	Site	Result	Attendance	Source
September 16	at Colorado College	Washburn Field; Colorado Springs, CO	W 18–14	1,000	
September 22	Northeast Missouri State*	Topeka, KS	L 9–27	4,200	
September 30	Central Missouri State*		W 27–13		
October 7	Colorado Mines*	Topeka, KS	W 20–6		
October 14	Emporia State		L 10–26		
October 21	St. Benedict's	Amelia Earhart Field; Atchison, KS	L 14–25		
October 28	No. 1 Pittsburg State	Topeka, KS	L 0–40	5,500	
November 4	Omaha		L 10–27	1,900	
November 10	Fort Hays State*		L 7–14		
*Non-conference game; Rankings from AP Poll released prior to the game
