= 1961 Fresno State Bulldogs football team =

American college football season

1961 Fresno State Bulldogs football

CCAA champion

Mercy Bowl, W 36–6 vs. Bowling Green
- Conference: California Collegiate Athletic Association

Ranking
- Coaches: No. 5 (UPI small college)
- AP: No. 3 (AP small college)
- Record: 10–0 (5–0 CCAA)
- Head coach: Cecil Coleman (3rd season)
- Home stadium: Ratcliffe Stadium

1961 California Collegiate Athletic Association football standings
	Conf.					Overall
Team	W		L		T	W		L		T
No. 3/5 Fresno State $	5	–	0	–	0	10	–	0	–	0
Cal Poly	3	–	2	–	0	4	–	4	–	0
San Diego State	2	–	2	–	1	7	–	2	–	1
Los Angeles State	2	–	2	–	1	4	–	4	–	1
Long Beach State	2	–	3	–	0	5	–	5	–	0
UC Santa Barbara	0	–	5	–	0	2	–	8	–	0
$ – Conference champion; Rankings from AP/UPI small college polls

The 1961 Fresno State Bulldogs football team was an American football team that represented Fresno State College (now known as California State University, Fresno) as a member of the California Collegiate Athletic Association (CCAA) during the 1961 college football season. In their third year head coach Cecil Coleman, the Bulldogs compiled a perfect 10–0 record (5–0 in conference games), won the CCAA championship for the fourth consecutive year, and outscored opponents by a total of 256 to 119.

At the end of the season, Fresno State took part in a charity bowl game, the Mercy Bowl, against Bowling Green. The game was played as a fundraiser in memory of 16 Cal Poly Mustangs football players killed in a plane crash following a game against Bowling Green a year earlier.

The team played its home games at Ratcliffe Stadium on the campus of Fresno City College in Fresno, California.

== Schedule ==
Date	Opponent	Rank	Site	Result	Attendance	Source
September 23	vs. Montana State*		Memorial Stadium; Great Falls, MT	W 16–13	6,000–6,800	
September 30	UC Santa Barbara		Ratcliffe Stadium; Fresno, CA	W 22–14	9,066–10,500	
October 7	at Pacific (CA)*		Pacific Memorial Stadium; Stockton, CA	W 20–19	9,500–10,000	
October 14	at Cal Poly		Mustang Stadium; San Luis Obispo, CA	W 42–13	6,000–7,250	
October 21	Los Angeles State	No. 10	Ratcliffe Stadium; Fresno, CA	W 35–6	11,151–13,000	
October 28	San Diego State	No. 6	Ratcliffe Stadium; Fresno, CA (rivalry)	W 27–6	6,595–8,000	
November 3	at Long Beach State	No. 6	Veterans Stadium; Long Beach, CA	W 37–14	4,800–5,000	
November 11	Abilene Christian*	No. 5	Ratcliffe Stadium; Fresno, CA	W 21–7	9,960–11,500	
November 18	San Jose State*	No. 3	Ratcliffe Stadium; Fresno, CA (rivalry)	W 36–27	14,141–15,000	
November 23	vs. Bowling Green*	No. 3	Los Angeles Memorial Coliseum; Los Angeles, CA (Mercy Bowl)	W 36–6	33,146	
*Non-conference game; Rankings from AP Poll released prior to the game

== Statistics ==
The team tallied 2,825 yards of total offense (313.9 yards per game), consisting of 1,798 rushing yards and 1,027 passing yards. On defense, the Bulldogs gave up 1,938 yards to opponents, including 1,069 rushing yards and 869 passing yards.

Quarterback Beau Carter led the team in passing, completing 43 of 86 passes (50%) for 557 yards with five touchdowns and four interceptions. He ranked second on the team in rushing with 480 yards on 59 carries. He also led the team in total offense with 981 yards ans scoring with 43 yards on six touchdowns, three extra point kicks, and a pair of two-point conversion runs.

Halfback Bill Kendrick led the team in rushing with 468 yards on 84 carries. End Gerald Houser led the team in receiving with 20 catches for 245 yards.

== Awards and seasons ==
Five Fresno State players were selected by the conference coaches as first-team players on the 1961 All-CCAA football team: back Bill Kendrick; tackles Montie Day and Sonny Biship; guard Doug Brown; and center J. R. Williams.

== Professional football ==
The following were selected in the 1962 NFL draft.

Player	Position	Round	Overall	NFL Team
Jesse Williams	Center	10	138	New York Giants
Bill Knocke	Halfback	17	233	Baltimore Colts
Sonny Bishop	Guard	18	249	Cleveland Browns
John Anabo	Quarterback	19	263	Cleveland Browns

The following were selected in the 1962 AFL draft.

Player	Position	Round	Overall	AFL Team
Sonny Bishop	Guard	11	88	San Diego Chargers
Jesse Williams	Center	21	168	San Diego Chargers
