= 1961 Humboldt State Lumberjacks football team =

American college football season

1961 Humboldt State Lumberjacks football

FWC co-champion
- Conference: Far Western Conference

Ranking
- Coaches: No. 16 (UPI small college)
- Record: 8–2 (4–1 FWC)
- Head coach: Phil Sarboe (11th season)
- Home stadium: Redwood Bowl

1961 Far Western Conference football standings
	Conf.					Overall
Team	W		L		T	W		L		T
No. 13/16 Humboldt State +	4	–	1	–	0	8	–	2	–	0
San Francisco State +	4	–	1	–	0	8	–	2	–	0
UC Davis	3	–	2	–	0	5	–	4	–	0
Nevada	2	–	3	–	0	5	–	4	–	0
Sacramento State	2	–	3	–	0	4	–	5	–	0
Chico State	0	–	5	–	0	4	–	6	–	0
+ – Conference co-champions; Rankings from NAIA poll and UPI small college poll

The 1961 Humboldt State Lumberjacks football team was an American football team that represented Humboldt State College (now known as California State Polytechnic University, Humboldt) as a member of the Far Western Conference (FWC) during the 1961 college football season. In their 11th year under head coach Phil Sarboe, the Lumberjacks compiled an 8–2 record (4–1 in conference games), tied for the FWC championship with San Francisco State, and outscored opponents by a total of 239 to 112. They were ranked No. 13 and No. 16 in the final AP and UPI small college polls.

The team's statistical leaders included fullback Ed White (696 rushing yards), quarterback Monty Feekes (356 passing yards), and end Drew Roberts (36 receptions, 507 yards). Five Humboldt players were selected as first-team players on the 1961 All-Far Western Conference football team: fullback Ed White; offensive end Drew Roberts; offensive tackle Vester Flanagan; offensive guard Al Frakes; defensive end Jim Walker; and defensive halfback Dennis Guiuntini.

The team played its home games at the Redwood Bowl in Arcata, California.

== Schedule ==
Date	Opponent	Rank	Site	Result	Attendance	Source
September 23	Eastern Washington*		Redwood Bowl; Arcata, CA	W 53–0	5,500	
September 30	at Willamette*		McCulloch Stadium; Salem, OR	W 27–13	4,500	
October 7	at San Francisco State	No. 5 AP / 4 UPI	Cox Stadium; San Francisco, CA	W 7–6	6,200	
October 14	at Sacramento State	No. 2 AP / 6 UPI	Charles C. Hughes Stadium; Sacramento, CA	L 7–19	6,000	
October 21	UC Davis	No. 9 UPI	Redwood Bowl; Arcata, CA	W 20–18	5,500	
October 28	Oregon Tech*	No. 14 UPI	Redwood Bowl; Arcata, CA	W 46–6	4,500	
November 4	at Chico State	No. 15 UPI	College Field; Chico, CA	W 29–12	5,000	
November 11	Nevada^{†}	No. 16 UPI	Redwood Bowl; Arcata, CA	W 16–14	7,500	
November 18	Central Washington*	No. 17 UPI	Redwood Bowl; Arcata, CA	W 34–14	5,000	
November 23	Whitworth*	No. 16 UPI	Redwood Bowl; Arcata, CA	L 0–10	3,500	
*Non-conference game; ^{†}Homecoming; Rankings from AP/UPI Poll released prior to the game

== Statistics ==
The Lumberjacks tallied 2,803 yards of total offense (280.3 per game), consisting of 1,857 rushing yards (185.7 per game) and 946 passing yards (94.6 per game). On defense, they gave up 2,075 yards (207.5 per game) with 1,376 rushing yards (137.6 per game) and 699 passing yards (69.9 per game).

Quarterback Monty Feekes completed 34 of 63 passes for 356 yards with two touchdowns and three interceptions. Backup quarterback Roger Toftt completed 20 of 41 passes for 279 yards.

Fullback Ed White led the team in rushing with 696 yards on 147 carries. Halfback Frank Buda ranked second with 552 yards on 121 carries. Buda led the team in scoring with 66 points on 11 touchdowns.

The team's leading receivers were ends Drew Roberts (36 catches, 507 yards) and Ron Remington (five catches for 167 yards).

== Awards and honors ==
Six Humboldt players were selected by the conference coaches and athletic directors for first-team honors on the 1961 All-Far Western Conference football team: end Drew Roberts; tackle Vester Flanagan; guard Al Frakes; fullback Ed White; defensive end Jim Walker; and defensive halfback Dennis Giuntini. Two others were named to the second team: center Parker Pollock and wingback Earl Love.
