= Ralph Brown (American football, born 1926) =

American football player and coach (1926–2016)

Biographical details
- Born: April 27, 1926; Newton, Kansas, U.S.
- Died: December 13, 2016 (aged 90); Salina, Kansas, U.S.

Playing career
- 1946: Oklahoma A&M
- 1947: Kansas
- Positions: Fullback, center

Coaching career (HC unless noted)
- 1950–1952: Sublette HS (KS)
- 1953: Junction City HS (KS)
- 1954–1957: Emporia HS (KS)
- 1958: Washburn (line)
- 1959–1961: Washburn

Head coaching record
- Overall: 9–18 (college)

Joseph Ralph Brown (April 27, 1926 – December 13, 2016) was an American football player and coach. He served as the head football coach at Washburn University in Topeka, Kansas, from 1959 to 1961, compiling a record of 9–18.

== Playing career ==
Brown played as a fullback in 1946 at Oklahoma Agricultural and Mechanical College—now known as Oklahoma State University–Stillwater. The next year, he transferred to the University of Kansas to play center. He did not play his last two years of college because of a back injury.

== Coaching career ==
Brown began his coaching career in the high-school rank in Kansas where he was the head football coach at Sublette High School (Sublette, Kansas) from 1950 to 1952, Junction City High School in 1953, and Emporia High School from 1954 to 1957.

In 1958, he was hired as head track coach and assistant football coach at Washburn University. After service a year as line coach under Dick Godlove, Brown was named the 26th head football coach at Washburn University, serving for three seasons, from 1959 to 1961, and compiling a record of compiling a record of 9–18.

== Head coaching record ==
=== College ===
Year	Team	Overall	Conference	Standing	Bowl/playoffs
Washburn Ichabods (Central Intercollegiate Conference) (1959–1961)
1959	Washburn	3–6	2–3	T–3rd	
1960	Washburn	3–6	2–3	T–3rd	
1961	Washburn	3–6	1–4	5th	
Washburn:		9–18	5–10		
Total:		9–18			
