= 1961 Los Angeles State Diablos football team =

American college football season

1961 Los Angeles State Diablos football
- Conference: California Collegiate Athletic Association
- Record: 4–4–1 (2–2–1 CCAA)
- Head coach: Leonard Adams (11th season)
- Home stadium: L.A. State Stadium; East Los Angeles College Stadium

1961 California Collegiate Athletic Association football standings
	Conf.					Overall
Team	W		L		T	W		L		T
No. 3/5 Fresno State $	5	–	0	–	0	10	–	0	–	0
Cal Poly	3	–	2	–	0	4	–	4	–	0
San Diego State	2	–	2	–	1	7	–	2	–	1
Los Angeles State	2	–	2	–	1	4	–	4	–	1
Long Beach State	2	–	3	–	0	5	–	5	–	0
UC Santa Barbara	0	–	5	–	0	2	–	8	–	0
$ – Conference champion; Rankings from AP/UPI small college polls

The 1961 Los Angeles State Diablos football team was an American football team that represented Los Angeles State College (now known as California State University, Los Angeles) as a member of the California Collegiate Athletic Association (CCAA) during the 1961 college football season. In their 11th year head coach Leonard Adams, the Diablos compiled a 4–4–1 record (2–2–1 in conference games), tied for third place in the CCAA, and were outscored by a total of 189 to 186.

The team's statistical leaders included quarterback Tom Kennedy (1,037 passing yards), halfback Joe Womack (668 rushing yards, 48 points scored), and end Dick Carey (424 receiving yards).

The Diablos played three home games at L.A. State Stadium in Los Angeles and two at East Los Angeles College Stadium in Monterey Park, California.

== Schedule ==
Date	Opponent	Site	Result	Attendance	Source
September 16	Cal Poly Pomona*	East Los Angeles College Stadium; Monterey Park, CA	L 11–21	5,200	
September 23	San Diego State	L.A. State Stadium; Los Angeles, CA	T 13–13	4,752	
September 30	University of Mexico*	East Los Angeles College Stadium; Monterey Park, CA	W 40–0		
October 7	at UC Santa Barbara	La Playa Stadium; Santa Barbara, CA	W 31–8	5,000	
October 14	San Francisco State*	L.A. State Stadium; Los Angeles, CA	W 28–21	3,750	
October 21	at No. 10 Fresno State	Ratcliffe Stadium; Fresno, CA	L 6–35	11,151	
October 28	at Pacific (CA)*	Pacific Memorial Stadium; Stockton, CA	L 27–45		
November 4	Cal Poly^{†}	L.A. State Stadium; Los Angeles, CA	L 13–40	2,000–4,983	
November 11	at Long Beach State	Veterans Stadium; Long Beach, CA	W 17–6	5,341–5,431	
*Non-conference game; ^{†}Homecoming; Rankings from AP Poll released prior to the game

== Statistics ==
The Diablos tallied 2,632 yards of total offense (292.4 per game), consisting of 1,305 passing yards (145.0 per game) and 1,327 rushing yards (147.5 per game). On defense, they gave up 2,585 yards (287.3 per game), including 1,150 passing yards (127.8 per game) and 1,435 rushing yards (159.4 per game).

Quarterback Tom Kennedy completed 70 of 155 passes for 1,037 yards with six touchdowns and eight interceptions. Despite losing 139 yards rushing, he also led the team in total offense with 897 yards of total offense. Kennedy was also the team's punter, averaging 34.9 yards on 46 punts.

Halfback Joe Womack led the team in rushing with 668 yards on 120 carries. Womack also led the team in scoring with 48 points on eight touchdowns.

End Dick Carey was the leading receiver with 29 receptions for 424 yards. He ranked second in scoring with 46 points on three touchdowns, 17 extra point kicks, three field goals, and a catch for a two-point conversion.

Other notable performers included fullback Bob Lyons (282 rushing yards on 71 carries) and end Darvin Howell (19 receptions, 388 yards).

== Awards and honors ==
End Dick Carey, guard Doug Brown, and halfback Joe Womack were selected as first-team players on the 1961 All-CCAA football team.

== Players in the NFL ==
The following Los Angeles State player was selected in the 1962 NFL draft.

Player	Position	Round	Overall	NFL team
Fred Gillett	Center, linebacker, guard	19	261	Baltimore Colts
