= 1961 Northern State Wolves football team =

American college football season

1961 Northern State Wolves football

SDIC champion

NAIA Semifinal, L 14–28 at Pittsburg State
- Conference: South Dakota Intercollegiate Conference
- Record: 9–1 (6–0 SDIC)
- Head coach: Clark Swisher (16th season)
- Home stadium: Simmons Field

1961 South Dakota Intercollegiate Conference football standings
	Conf.					Overall
Team	W		L		T	W		L		T
No. 6 Northern State $^	6	–	0	–	0	9	–	1	–	0
Huron	5	–	1	–	0	7	–	2	–	0
Southern State (SD)	4	–	2	–	0	6	–	3	–	0
South Dakota Tech	2	–	4	–	0	3	–	5	–	0
Black Hills	2	–	4	–	0	3	–	5	–	0
Dakota Wesleyan	2	–	4	–	0	2	–	7	–	0
General Beadle	0	–	6	–	0	2	–	7	–	0
$ – Conference champion; ^ – NAIA playoff participant; Rankings from NAIA poll

The 1961 Northern State Wolves football team was an American football team that represented Northern State Teachers College (now known as Northern State University) as a member of the South Dakota Intercollegiate Conference (SDIC) during the 1961 college football season. In their 16th year under head coach Clark Swisher, the Wolves compiled a 9–0 record in the regular season (6–0 in conference games), won the SDIC championship, outscored opponents by a total of 357 to 82, and were ranked No. 6 in the final NAIA poll. Northern State then lost to the eventual national champion, Pittsburg State, in an NAIA semifinal playoff game. The team played home games at Simmons Field in Aberdeen, South Dakota.

Senior fullback Jim Vogt scored 22 points against Dakota Wesleyan, and was one of the nation's leading rushers and scorers, but he was lost to the team after sustaining chipped vertebrae and a near fracture in his neck.

== Schedule ==
Date	Opponent	Site	Result	Source
September 9	Moorhead State*	Aberdeen, SD	W 46–10	
September 16	at Southern State (SD)	Springfield, SD	W 27–20	
September 23	South Dakota Tech	Aberdeen, SD	W 47–0	
September 30	Dakota Wesleyan	Aberdeen, SD	W 40–13	
October 7	Nebraska Wesleyan*^{†}	Aberdeen, SD (Gypsy Day)	W 32–0	
October 14	at Black Hills	Spearfish, SD	W 52–13	
October 21	Huron	Simmons Field; Aberdeen, SD	W 33–13	
October 28	at General Beadle	Madison, SD	W 41–13	
November 4	Dickinson State*	Aberdeen, SD	W 39–0	
November 23	at No. 1 Pittsburg State*	Pittsburg, KS (NAIA Semifinal)	L 14–28	
*Non-conference game; ^{†}Homecoming; Rankings from AP Poll released prior to the game
