= 1961 Chico State Wildcats football team =

American college football season

1961 Chico State Wildcats football
- Conference: Far Western Conference
- Record: 4–6 (0–5 FWC)
- Head coach: George Maderos (4th season)
- Home stadium: College Field

1961 Far Western Conference football standings
	Conf.					Overall
Team	W		L		T	W		L		T
No. 13/16 Humboldt State +	4	–	1	–	0	8	–	2	–	0
San Francisco State +	4	–	1	–	0	8	–	2	–	0
UC Davis	3	–	2	–	0	5	–	4	–	0
Nevada	2	–	3	–	0	5	–	4	–	0
Sacramento State	2	–	3	–	0	4	–	5	–	0
Chico State	0	–	5	–	0	4	–	6	–	0
+ – Conference co-champions; Rankings from NAIA poll and UPI small college poll

The 1961 Chico State Wildcats football team was an American football team that represented Chico State College (now known as California State University, Chico) as a member of the Far Western Conference (FWC) during the 1961 college football season. In their fourth year under head coach George Maderos, the Wildcats compiled a 4–6 record (0–5 in conference games), finished last out of six teams in the FWC, and were outscored by a total of 226 to 162.

The team's statistical leaders included quarterback Al Allison (803 passing yards), halfback/fullback Bill Morris (389 yards), and end Ed Burton (566 receiving yards, 44 points scored). Mario Serafin received first-team all-conference honors as a linebacker and second-team honors as an offensive guard.

The team played its home games at College Field in Chico, California.

== Schedule ==
Date	Opponent	Site	Result	Attendance	Source
September 16	Southern Oregon*	College Field; Chico, CA	W 27–7	3,800	
September 23	Pepperdine*	College Field; Chico, CA	W 27–16	3,850	
September 30	Pacific (OR)*	College Field; Chico, CA	W 20–17	3,700	
October 7	at Nevada	Mackay Stadium (Note: This stadium is the predecessor to the current Mackay Stadium, which was opened for the 1966 season.); Reno, NV	L 6–27	2,500	
October 14	at Linfield*	Maxwell Field; McMinnville, OR	L 7–34	1,200	
October 21	Sacramento State	College Field; Chico, CA	L 10–14	6,600	
October 28	at Santa Clara*	Mission Field; Santa Clara, CA	W 21–19	3,000	
November 4	Humboldt State	College Field; Chico, CA	L 12–29	5,000	
November 10	at UC Davis	Aggie Field; Davis, CA	L 7–28	4,000	
November 18	San Francisco State	College Field; Chico, CA	L 25–42	5,000	
*Non-conference game

== Statistics ==
The Wildcats tallied 2,672 yards of total offense (267.2 per game), consisting of 1,608 rushing yards (160.8 per game) and 1,064 passing yards (106.4 per game). On defense, they gave up 3,269 yards (326.9 per game) including 2,393 rushing yards (239.3 per game) and 876 passing yards (87.6 per game).

Quarterback Al Allison completed 54 of 139 passes for 803 yards with six touchdowns and 11 interceptions. He also led the team with 777 yards of total offense (including negative 26 rushing yards).

The team's leading rushers were halfback/fullback Bill Morris (389 yards, 93 carries, 4.18 yards per carry) and halfback Jess Castillo (365 yards, 69 carries, 5.29 yards per carry).

End Ed Burton led the team in both receiving (40 receptions, 566 yards) nand scoring (44 points on five touchdowns, 11 extra point kicks, and a field goal).

== Awards and honors ==
Mario Serafin was selected as a first-team linebacker on the 1961 All-Far Western Conference football team. He was also selected as a second-team guard on the offensive team. Two others received second team honors: end Ed Burton (offense); and tackle Tom McKerras (defense).
