= 1961 San Diego State Aztecs football team =

American college football season

1961 San Diego State Aztecs football
- Conference: California Collegiate Athletic Association
- Record: 7–2–1 (2–2–1 CCAA)
- Head coach: Don Coryell (1st season)
- Home stadium: Aztec Bowl

1961 California Collegiate Athletic Association football standings
| | Conf. | | | | | Overall |
| Team | W | | L | | T | W | | L | | T |
|---|---|---|---|---|---|---|---|---|---|---|
| No. 3/5 Fresno State $ | 5 | – | 0 | – | 0 | 10 | – | 0 | – | 0 |
| Cal Poly | 3 | – | 2 | – | 0 | 4 | – | 4 | – | 0 |
| San Diego State | 2 | – | 2 | – | 1 | 7 | – | 2 | – | 1 |
| Los Angeles State | 2 | – | 2 | – | 1 | 4 | – | 4 | – | 1 |
| Long Beach State | 2 | – | 3 | – | 0 | 5 | – | 5 | – | 0 |
| UC Santa Barbara | 0 | – | 5 | – | 0 | 2 | – | 8 | – | 0 |
$ – Conference champion; Rankings from AP/UPI small college polls

The 1961 San Diego State Aztecs football team was an American football team that represented San Diego State College (now known as San Diego State University (Note: San Diego State University) was known as San Diego State College from 1935 to 1971.) as a member of the California Collegiate Athletic Association (CCAA) during the 1961 college football season. In their first year under head coach Don Coryell, the Aztecs compiled a 7–2–1 record (2–2–1 in conference games), tied for third place in the CCAA, and outscored opponents by a total of 231 to 154. This was a big turn-around from the previous year, when they had won just a single game.

The team played its home games at Aztec Bowl in San Diego.

== Schedule ==
| Date | Opponent | Site | Result | Attendance | Source |
|---|---|---|---|---|---|
| September 23 | at Los Angeles State | L.A. State Stadium; Los Angeles, CA | T 13–13 | 4,752 | |
| September 30 | Cal Poly | Aztec Bowl; San Diego, CA | W 9–6 | 9,000 | |
| October 7 | Long Beach State | Aztec Bowl; San Diego, CA | L 15–17 | 9,000 | |
| October 14 | at Redlands* | Redlands Stadium (Note: This stadium is the predecessor to the current Ted Runner Stadium on the University of Redlands campus, which was opened for the 1968 season); Redlands, CA | W 32–20 | 4,200 | |
| October 21 | UC Santa Barbara^{†} | Aztec Bowl; San Diego, CA | W 21–6 | 8,500–9,500 | |
| October 28 | at No. 6 Fresno State | Ratcliffe Stadium; Fresno, CA (rivalry) | L 6–27 | 9,000 | |
| November 4 | at Pepperdine* | Sentinel Field; Inglewood, CA | W 21–6 | 9,000 | |
| November 11 | Cal Western* | Aztec Bowl; San Diego, CA | W 54–34 | 7,500 | |
| November 18 | San Diego* | Aztec Bowl; San Diego, CA | W 42–12 | 10,000 | |
| November 27 | San Diego Marines (Note: The Marine Corps Recruit Depot (MCRD) in San Diego fielded a team that played against colleges and other military teams from 1922 to 1964.)* | Aztec Bowl; San Diego, CA | W 18–13 | 8,000 | |
*Non-conference game; ^{†}Homecoming; Rankings from AP Poll released prior to the game

== Team awards ==
| Award | Player |
|---|---|
| Most Valuable Player (John Simcox Memorial Trophy) | Kern Carson |
| Outstanding Offensive & Defensive Linemen (Byron H. Chase Memorial Trophy) | David Lay |
| Most Inspirational Player | Warren Simmons |
