= 1960 Willamette Bearcats football team =

College football season

1960 Willamette Bearcats football

NWC champion
- Conference: Northwest Conference
- Record: 8–0 (5–0 NWC)
- Head coach: Ted Ogdahl (9th season)
- Home stadium: McCulloch Stadium

1960 Northwest Conference football standings
	Conf.					Overall
Team	W		L		T	W		L		T
No. 10 Willamette $	5	–	0	–	0	8	–	0	–	0
Linfield	4	–	1	–	0	7	–	2	–	0
Lewis & Clark	3	–	2	–	0	6	–	4	–	0
Pacific (OR)	2	–	3	–	0	5	–	4	–	0
Whitman	1	–	4	–	0	3	–	6	–	0
College of Idaho	0	–	5	–	0	2	–	8	–	0
$ – Conference champion; Rankings from NAIA poll

The 1960 Willamette Bearcats football team was an American football team that represented Willamette University of Salem, Oregon, as a member of the Northwest Conference during the 1960 NAIA football season. In their ninth season under head coach Ted Ogdahl, the Bearcats compiled an 8–0 record (5–0 against NWC opponents), won the conference championship, and were ranked No. 10 in the final NAIA football poll.

The team played its home games at McCulloch Stadium in Salem, Oregon.

== Schedule ==
Date	Opponent	Site	Result	Attendance	Source
September 17	Puget Sound*	McCulloch Stadium; Salem, OR	W 27–26		
September 24	at Western Washington*	Bellingham, WA	W 15–0		
October 1	at Pacific (OR)	Forest Grove, OR	W 25–14	2,500	
October 8	at Lewis & Clark	Griswold Stadium; Portland, OR]	W 40–13	2,500	
October 15	College of Idaho	McCulloch Stadium; Salem, OR	W 53–7	2,500	
October 22	Linfield	McCulloch Stadium; Salem, OR	W 14–13	5,100	
October 29	at Whitman	Walla Walla, WA	W 40–0	2,000	
November 12	UBC*	McCulloch Stadium; Salem, OR	W 33–17		
*Non-conference game
