= 1961 Long Beach State 49ers football team =

American college football season

1961 Long Beach State 49ers football
- Conference: California Collegiate Athletic Association
- Record: 5–5 (2–3 CCAA)
- Head coach: Don Reed (4th season)
- Home stadium: Veterans Memorial Stadium

1961 California Collegiate Athletic Association football standings
	Conf.					Overall
Team	W		L		T	W		L		T
No. 3/5 Fresno State $	5	–	0	–	0	10	–	0	–	0
Cal Poly	3	–	2	–	0	4	–	4	–	0
San Diego State	2	–	2	–	1	7	–	2	–	1
Los Angeles State	2	–	2	–	1	4	–	4	–	1
Long Beach State	2	–	3	–	0	5	–	5	–	0
UC Santa Barbara	0	–	5	–	0	2	–	8	–	0
$ – Conference champion; Rankings from AP/UPI small college polls

The 1961 Long Beach State 49ers football team was an American football team that represented Long Beach State College (now known as California State University, Long Beach) as a member of the California Collegiate Athletic Association (CCAA) during the 1961 college football season. In their fourth year under head coach Don Reed, the 49ers compiled a 5–5 record (2–3 in conference games), finished in fifth place in the CCAA, and were outscored by a total of 174 to 142.

The team's statistical leaders included quarterback Pete Yoder (624 passing yards), halfback Dallas Moon (402 rushing yards), end Bob Heberer (254 receiving yards), and fullback Steve Hartman (30 points scored, five rushing touchdowns).

The team played its home games at Veterans Memorial Stadium adjacent to the campus of Long Beach City College in Long Beach, California.

== Schedule ==
Date	Time	Opponent	Site	Result	Attendance	Source
September 16	8:00 pm	at Pacific (CA)*	Pacific Memorial Stadium; Stockton, CA	L 7–12	6,500	
September 23	2:00 pm	at San Francisco State*	Cox Stadium; San Francisco, CA	L 9–14	5,500	
September 30	8:00 pm	Sacramento State*	Veterans Memorial Stadium; Long Beach, CA	W 21–18	4,400	
October 7	8:00 pm	at San Diego State	Aztec Bowl; San Diego, CA	W 17–15	7,500–9,000	
October 13	8:15 pm	at UC Santa Barbara	La Playa Stadium; Santa Barbara, CA	W 18–13	3,100–4,000	
October 21	8:00 pm	at Cal Poly	Mustang Stadium; San Luis Obispo, CA	L 14–21	4,100–6,000	
October 28	8:00 pm	San Diego*	Veterans Memorial Stadium; Long Beach, CA	W 14–12	3,900	
November 3	8:00 pm	No. 6 Fresno State	Veterans Memorial Stadium; Long Beach, CA	L 14–37	4,900–5,000	
November 11	8:00 pm	Los Angeles State^{†}	Veterans Memorial Stadium; Long Beach, CA	L 6–17	5,341–5,431	
November 18	8:00 pm	at Pepperdine*	Sentinel Field; Inglewood, CA	W 22–15	1,500	
*Non-conference game; ^{†}Homecoming; Rankings from AP Poll released prior to the game

== Statistics ==
The 49ers tallied 2,421 yards of total offense (242.1 per game), consisting of 1,806 rushing yards (180.6 per game) and 715 passing yards (71.5 per game). On defense, they gave up 1,655 rushing yards (165.5 per game) and 1,032 passing yards (103.2 per game).

Quarterback Pete Yoder led the team in both passing yards and total offense. He completed 48 of 111 passes for 624 yards with five touchdowns and 12 interceptions. He tallied negative 100 rushing yards and led the team with 524 yards of total offense. Yoder also handled punting duties, averaging 33.2 yards on 45 punts.

Halfback Dallas Moon led the team in rushing, tallying 402 rushing yards on 72 carries. He ranked second on the team in scoring with 20 points on three touchdowns and a two-point conversion catch.

Fullback Steve Hartman led the team in scoring with 30 points on five touchdowns. He ranked second on the team in rushing with 351 yards on 76 carries.

== Players in the NFL or AFL ==
Guard/tackle Lynn Hoyem was drafted by the Dallas Cowboys in the 19th round (254th pick) of the 1962 NFL draft. Hoyem was also selected by the Denver Broncos in the 29th round (226th pick) of the 1962 AFL draft. He played for six years in the NFL.
