= 1961 Cal Poly Mustangs football team =

American college football season

1961 Cal Poly Mustangs football
- Conference: California Collegiate Athletic Association
- Record: 4–4 (3–2 CCAA)
- Head coach: LeRoy Hughes (12th season)
- Home stadium: Mustang Stadium

1961 California Collegiate Athletic Association football standings
| | Conf. | | | | | Overall |
| Team | W | | L | | T | W | | L | | T |
|---|---|---|---|---|---|---|---|---|---|---|
| No. 3/5 Fresno State $ | 5 | – | 0 | – | 0 | 10 | – | 0 | – | 0 |
| Cal Poly | 3 | – | 2 | – | 0 | 4 | – | 4 | – | 0 |
| San Diego State | 2 | – | 2 | – | 1 | 7 | – | 2 | – | 1 |
| Los Angeles State | 2 | – | 2 | – | 1 | 4 | – | 4 | – | 1 |
| Long Beach State | 2 | – | 3 | – | 0 | 5 | – | 5 | – | 0 |
| UC Santa Barbara | 0 | – | 5 | – | 0 | 2 | – | 8 | – | 0 |
$ – Conference champion; Rankings from AP/UPI small college polls

The 1961 Cal Poly Mustangs football team was an American football team that represented California Polytechnic State College (now known as California Polytechnic State University, San Luis Obispo) as a member of the California Collegiate Athletic Association (CCAA) during the 1961 college football season. In their 12th and final year under head coach LeRoy Hughes, the Mustangs compiled a 4–4 record (3–2 in conference games), finished in second place in the CCAA, and outscored opponents by a total of 181 to 138.

The team's statistical leaders included quarterback Ted Tollner (899 passing yards), halfback Paul Lewis (302 rushing yards), and end Fred Brown (430 receiving yards, 36 points scored). Tollner and Brown received first-team honors on the 1961 All-CCAA football team.

The Mustangs played home games at Mustang Stadium in San Luis Obispo, California.

== Schedule ==
| Date | Opponent | Site | Result | Attendance | Source |
|---|---|---|---|---|---|
| September 30 | at San Diego State | Aztec Bowl; San Diego, CA | L 6–9 | 4,000–9,000 | |
| October 7 | at Valley State* | Monroe High School; North Hills, CA | W 43–8 | 500 | |
| October 14 | Fresno State | Mustang Stadium; San Luis Obispo, CA | L 13–42 | 6,000–7,250 | |
| October 21 | Long Beach State | Mustang Stadium; San Luis Obispo, CA | W 21–14 | 4,100–6,000 | |
| October 28 | San Diego Marines (Note: The Marine Corps Recruit Depot (MCRD) in San Diego fielded a team that played against colleges and other military teams from 1922 to 1964.)* | Mustang Stadium; San Luis Obispo, CA | L 20–28 | 6,500 | |
| November 4 | at Los Angeles State | L.A. State Stadium; Los Angeles, CA | W 40–13 | 2,000–4,983 | |
| November 11 | Adams State* | Mustang Stadium; San Luis Obispo, CA | L 6–10 | 4,500–5,000 | |
| November 17 | UC Santa Barbara | Mustang Stadium; San Luis Obispo, CA | W 32–14 | 5,000 | |
*Non-conference game

== Statistics ==
The Mustangs tallied 2,228 yards of total offense (278.5 per game), consisting of 1,224 passing yards (153.0 per game) and 904 rushing yards (113.0 per game). On defense, they gave up 1,887 yards of total offense (235.9 per game), including 666 passing yards (83.3 per game) and 1,221 rushing yards (152.6 per game).<rer name=NCAA/>

Quarterback Ted Tollner completed 67 of 133 passes for 899 yards with 10 touchdowns and 14 interceptions. Despite losing 85 yards rushing, Tollner also led the team with 814 yards of total offense.

End Fred Brown led the team in both receiving (30 receptions, 430 yards, six touchdowns) and scoring (36 points scored).

The team's leading rushers were halfback Paul Lewis (302 yards, 47 carries) and fullback Wayne Maples (222 yards, 42 carries).

== Awards and honors ==
End Fred Brown and quarterback Ted Tollner were selected by conference coaches as first-team players on the 1961 All-CCAA football team.
