= 1961 UC Santa Barbara Gauchos football team =

American college football season

1961 UC Santa Barbara Gauchos football
- Conference: California Collegiate Athletic Association
- Record: 2–8 (0–5 CCAA)
- Head coach: Bill Hammer (2nd season)
- Home stadium: La Playa Stadium

1961 California Collegiate Athletic Association football standings
	Conf.					Overall
Team	W		L		T	W		L		T
No. 3/5 Fresno State $	5	–	0	–	0	10	–	0	–	0
Cal Poly	3	–	2	–	0	4	–	4	–	0
San Diego State	2	–	2	–	1	7	–	2	–	1
Los Angeles State	2	–	2	–	1	4	–	4	–	1
Long Beach State	2	–	3	–	0	5	–	5	–	0
UC Santa Barbara	0	–	5	–	0	2	–	8	–	0
$ – Conference champion; Rankings from AP/UPI small college polls

The 1961 UC Santa Barbara Gauchos football team was an American football team that represented University of California, Santa Barbara (UCSB) as a member of the California Collegiate Athletic Association (CCAA) during the 1961 college football season. In their second year under head coach Bill Hammer, the Gauchos compiled a 2–8 record (0–5 in conference games), finished in last place in the CCAA, and were outscored by a total of 231 to 100.

The team played its home games at La Playa Stadium in Santa Barbara, California.

== Schedule ==
Date	Opponent	Site	Result	Attendance	Source
September 16	at San Francisco State*	Cox Stadium; San Francisco, CA	L 0–59	2,500	
September 23	Whittier*	La Playa Stadium; Santa Barbara, CA	L 0–20	7,500	
September 30	at Fresno State	Ratcliffe Stadium; Fresno, CA	L 14–22	9,066–10,500	
October 7	Los Angeles State	La Playa Stadium; Santa Barbara, CA	L 8–31	5,000	
October 13	Long Beach State	La Playa Stadium; Santa Barbara, CA	L 13–18	3,100–4,000	
October 21	at San Diego State	Aztec Bowl; San Diego, CA	L 6–21	8,500–9,500	
October 28	Occidental*^{†}	La Playa Stadium; Santa Barbara, CA	L 13–14	6,000–6,500	
November 4	vs. UC Davis (Note: The game against UC Davis was part of an "All-UC Doubleheader" that was held annually from 1948 to 1963. The other game of the double-header was California vs. UCLA. The games were always held at the home stadium of either Cal or UCLA.)*	Los Angeles Memorial Coliseum; Los Angeles, CA	W 13–0	2,000	
November 10	Pepperdine*	La Playa Stadium; Santa Barbara, CA	W 19–14	2,000	
November 17	at Cal Poly	Mustang Stadium; San Luis Obispo, CA	L 14–32	4,500–5,000	
*Non-conference game; ^{†}Homecoming
