= Noah G. Allen =

American football coach and administrator (born 1927)

Biographical details
- Born: November 14, 1927 (age 98); Bristow, Oklahoma, U.S.

Playing career
- 1947–1949: Wichita

Coaching career (HC unless noted)
- 1950: Winfield HS (KS) (assistant)
- 1951–1953: Derby HS (KS)
- 1954: Sill Indian School (OK)
- 1955–1956: Chanute HS (KS)
- 1957–1960: New Mexico State (backfield)
- 1961–1964: Pacific (OR)

Administrative career (AD unless noted)
- 1961–1965: Pacific (OR)
- 1965–1968: Wichita State
- 1971: Haskell

Head coaching record
- Overall: 8–26 (college)

Noah G. Allen (born November 14, 1927) is an American former football coach and college athletics administrator. He served as the head football coach at Pacific University in Forest Grove, Oregon from 1961 to 1964, compiling a record of 8–26, and later served as the athletic director at his alma mater, Wichita State University.

== Head coaching record ==
=== College ===
| Year | Team | Overall | Conference | Standing | Bowl/playoffs |
|---|---|---|---|---|---|
Pacific Badgers (Northwest Conference) (1961–1964)
| 1961 | Pacific | 0–9 | 0–5 | 6th | |
| 1962 | Pacific | 1–8 | 1–4 | 5th | |
| 1963 | Pacific | 3–6 | 2–3 | 4th | |
| 1964 | Pacific | 5–3 | 3–2 | 3rd | |
| Pacific: | | 8–26 | 6–14 | | |
| Total: | | 8–26 | | | |
