= 1961 Nevada Wolf Pack football team =

American college football season

1961 Nevada Wolf Pack football
- Conference: Far Western Conference
- Record: 5–4 (2–3 FWC)
- Head coach: Dick Trachok (3rd season)
- Home stadium: Mackay Stadium

1961 Far Western Conference football standings
	Conf.					Overall
Team	W		L		T	W		L		T
No. 13/16 Humboldt State +	4	–	1	–	0	8	–	2	–	0
San Francisco State +	4	–	1	–	0	8	–	2	–	0
UC Davis	3	–	2	–	0	5	–	4	–	0
Nevada	2	–	3	–	0	5	–	4	–	0
Sacramento State	2	–	3	–	0	4	–	5	–	0
Chico State	0	–	5	–	0	4	–	6	–	0
+ – Conference co-champions; Rankings from NAIA poll and UPI small college poll

The 1961 Nevada Wolf Pack football team was an American football team that represented the University of Nevada as a member of the Far Western Conference (FWC) during the 1961 college football season. In their third year head under coach Dick Trachok, the Wolf Pack compiled a 5–4 record (2–3 in conference games), tied for fourth place in the FWC, and were outscored by a total of 179 to 153.

The team's statistical leaders included quarterback Jack Renwick (724 rushing yards, 53 points scored), halfback Bobby Herron (444 rushing yards), and end Jim Whitaker (294 receiving yards). Three Nevada players received first-team all-conference honors: end Jim Whitaker; defensive tackle Larry Moss; and linebacker Max Culp.

The team played its home games at Mackay Stadium in Reno, Nevada.

== Schedule ==
Date	Opponent	Site	Result	Attendance	Source
September 23	at Redlands*	Redlands Stadium; Redlands, CA	L 0–25	3,000	
September 30	Portland State*	Mackay Stadium; Reno, NV	W 41–20	4,000	
October 7	Chico State	Mackay Stadium; Reno, NV	W 27–6	3,350	
October 14	UC Davis	Mackay Stadium; Reno, NV	L 12–36	4,500–4,600	
October 21	at San Francisco State	Cox Stadium; San Francisco, CA	L 0–48	4,500	
October 28	Cal Poly Pomona*^{†}	Mackay Stadium; Reno, NV	W 28–20	4,500–4,600	
November 4	at Sacramento State	Charles C. Hughes Stadium; Sacramento, CA	W 14–8	6,500	
November 11	at Humboldt State	Redwood Bowl; Arcata, CA	L 14–16	7,400–7,500	
November 18	Colorado State–Greeley*	Mackay Stadium; Reno, NV	W 17–0	2,250	
*Non-conference game; ^{†}Homecoming

== Statistics ==
The team tallied 2,055 yards of total offense (228.3 per game) consisting of 1,186 rushing yards (131.8 per game) and 869 passing yards (96.5 per game). On defense, they allowed opponents to gain 2,566 yards (285.1 per game) including 1,233 rushing yards (137.0 per game) and 1,333 passing yards (148.1 per game).

QuarterbackJack Renwick led the team in passing, total offense, and scoring. He completed 52 of 111 passes for 724 yards with seven touchdowns and 11 interceptions. He also gained 110 rushing yards to boost his total offense to 834 yards. He scored 53 points on six touchdowns, 14 extra point kicks, and one field goal.

The team's rushing leaders were halfbacks Bobby Herron (444 yards, 96 carries) and Cal Campbell (241 yards, 65 carries). Campbell also ranked second in scoring with 42 yards on seven touchdowns.

The team's receiving leaders were end Jim Whitaker (21 receptions, 294 yards, one touchdown) and halfback Cal Campbell (11 receptions, 130 yards, three touchdowns).

Backup quarterback Bob Alfred handled punting, averaging 39.9 yards on 48 punts. Alfred also completed 13 of 27 passes for 129 yards with three interceptions.

== Awards and honors ==
Three Nevada players received first-team honors on the 1961 All-Far Western Conference football team: end Jim Whitaker (first-team offense, second-team defense); defensive tackle Larry Moss; and linebacker Max Culp. Five others received second-team honors: quarterback Jack Renwick; tackle Tony Klenakis; defensive end Gary Busch; and defensive tackle Tom McKerras.
