= Al Caniglia =

American football coach

Biographical details
- Born: August 21, 1921; Omaha, Nebraska, U.S.
- Died: February 19, 1974 (aged 52); Omaha, Nebraska, U.S.

Coaching career (HC unless noted)
- 1948–1949: Saint Louis (assistant)
- 1951–1958: Hillsboro HS (IL)
- 1959: Omaha (assistant)
- 1960–1973: Omaha/Nebraska–Omaha

Head coaching record
- Overall: 75–55–5 (college)
- Bowls: 1–0

Accomplishments and honors

Championships
- 5 CIC (1962–1963, 1965, 1967–1968)

Alfred Filadelfo Caniglia (August 21, 1921 – February 19, 1974) was an American football coach. He served as the head football coach at the University of Nebraska Omaha from 1960 to 1973, compiling a record of 75–55–5. Caniglia died on February 19, 1974, at Bergan Mercy Hospital in Omaha, Nebraska.

== Head coaching record ==
=== College ===
Year	Team	Overall	Conference	Standing	Bowl/playoffs
Omaha / Nebraska–Omaha Indians (Central Intercollegiate Conference) (1960–1968)
1960	Omaha	1–7–1	1–4	T–5th	
1961	Omaha	6–3	4–1	2nd	
1962	Omaha	8–1–1	4–0–1	1st	W All-Sports Bowl
1963	Omaha	7–2	4–0	1st	
1964	Omaha	5–4	2–2	T–2nd	
1965	Omaha	8–2	4–0	1st	
1966	Omaha	1–9	1–3	T–4th	
1967	Omaha	7–3	4–0	1st	
1968	Nebraska–Omaha	4–5	4–0	1st	
Nebraska–Omaha Indians/Mavericks (Rocky Mountain Athletic Conference) (1969–1971)
1969	Nebraska–Omaha	3–6	2–2	T–4th (Plains)	
1970	Nebraska–Omaha	4–5–1	4–2	3rd (Plains)	
1971	Nebraska–Omaha	5–4–1	2–2–1	3rd (Plains)	
Nebraska–Omaha Mavericks (Great Plains Athletic Conference) (1972)
1972	Nebraska–Omaha	8–2	4–2	T–2nd	
Nebraska–Omaha Mavericks (NCAA Division II independent) (1973)
1973	Nebraska–Omaha	7–2–1			
Omaha:		75–55–4	40–18–2		
Total:		75–55–4			
National championship Conference title Conference division title or championship game berth
