= Joe Huston =

American football player and coach

Biographical details
- Born: March 10, 1915; Colfax, Washington, U.S.
- Died: March 21, 1975 (aged 60); Portland, Oregon, U.S.

Playing career
- 1934–1937: Oregon
- 1938: Hollywood Stars
- Position: Guard

Coaching career (HC unless noted)
- 1940: Bend HS (OR)
- 1941: Roosevelt HS (OR)
- 1946: Grant HS (OR)
- 1947–1964: Lewis & Clark

Administrative career (AD unless noted)
- 1964–1972: Lewis & Clark

Head coaching record
- Overall: 100–52–7 (college); 24–11 (high school)

Accomplishments and honors

Championships
- 6 NWC (1949–1951, 1954–1955, 1963)

Joe Huston (March 10, 1915 – March 21, 1975) was an American football player and coach and college athletic administrator. He served as the head football coach at Lewis & Clark College in Portland, Oregon, from 1947 to 1964. Huston was also the school's athletic director from 1964 to 1972.

Huston began his coaching career at the high school level, first at Bend High School in Bend, Oregon, and then at Roosevelt High School and Grant High School in Portland. He was hired at Lewis & Clark in September 1947 to succeed Robert L. Mathews, who died suddenly on September 1.

Huston was born March 10, 1915, in Colfax, Washington. He died on March 21, 1975, of an apparent heart attack in his sleep, at his home in Portland.

== Head coaching record ==
=== College ===
Year	Team	Overall	Conference	Standing	Bowl/playoffs
Lewis & Clark Pioneers (Northwest Conference) (1947–1964)
1947	Lewis & Clark	2–3–3	0–3–2	8th	
1948	Lewis & Clark	6–2	4–2	T–3rd	
1949	Lewis & Clark	6–3	4–1	T–1st	
1950	Lewis & Clark	9–0	5–0	1st	
1951	Lewis & Clark	6–2	4–1	T–1st	
1952	Lewis & Clark	1–6–1	1–4	T–5th	
1953	Lewis & Clark	4–5	2–3	T–4th	
1954	Lewis & Clark	8–2	4–1	T–1st	
1955	Lewis & Clark	6–2	4–1	T–1st	
1956	Lewis & Clark	7–3	3–2	2nd	
1957	Lewis & Clark	4–6	1–4	5th	
1958	Lewis & Clark	4–4–1	2–2–1	3rd	
1959	Lewis & Clark	4–5	3–2	2nd	
1960	Lewis & Clark	6–4	3–2	3rd	
1961	Lewis & Clark	6–3	3–2	T–3rd	
1962	Lewis & Clark	7–1–1	3–1–1	T–2nd	
1963	Lewis & Clark	8–0	5–0	1st	
1964	Lewis & Clark	6–1–1	4–1	2nd	
Lewis & Clark:		100–52–7	55–32–4		
Total:		100–52–7			
National championship Conference title Conference division title or championship game berth
