= Kristine Dillon =

American academic administrator

President of Whittier College
- Incumbent
- Assumed office July 1, 2023
- Preceded by: Sal Johnston (interim)

Personal details
- Education: Whittier College; Claremont Graduate University

Kristine Elaine Dillon is an American academic administrator serving as the president of Whittier College since 2023 (interim July 1, 2023 through May 10, 2024). She was president of the Consortium on Financing Higher Education from 2002 to 2018.

== Life ==
Dillon earned a B.A. in English from Whittier College in 1973. She completed a M.Ed. (1977) and Ph.D. (1980) in the economics of higher education from Claremont Graduate University. Her dissertation was titled, The Rising Costs of Higher Education, 1946-1977. Howard Bowen was her doctoral advisor.

Dillon was a senior leader in student affairs at the University of Southern California from 1985 to 1998. From 1998 to 2002, she served as dean of academic services and student affairs at Tufts University. She was president of the Consortium on Financing Higher Education from 2002 to 2018. In 2019, Dillon became a senior advisor of higher education practice at Huron Consulting Group. On July 1, 2023, she became interim president of Whittier College, succeeding interim president Sal Johnston. She had served on its board from 1994 to 2013 and as chair of its enrollment and student life committee from 2002 to 2012. She rejoined the board in 2023.
