= Ted Ogdahl =

American football player and coach (1921–1988)

Biographical details
- Born: October 1, 1921
- Died: July 28, 1988 (aged 66); Salem, Oregon, U.S.

Playing career
- 1940–1943: Willamette
- 1946: San Diego Bombers
- Positions: Halfback, fullback

Coaching career (HC unless noted)
- 1948–1951: Grant HS (OR)
- 1952–1971: Willamette

Head coaching record
- Overall: 98–64–10 (college); 37–3–3 (high school)
- Tournaments: 0–1 (NAIA playoffs)

Accomplishments and honors

Championships
- 7 NWC (1954, 1958–1960, 1967–1968, 1971)

Tillman Theodore Ogdahl (October 1, 1921 – July 29, 1988) was an American football player and coach. He served as the head football coach at Willamette University in Salem, Oregon from 1952 to 1971, compiling a record of 98–64–10.

== Head coaching record ==
=== College ===
Year	Team	Overall	Conference	Standing	Bowl/playoffs
Willamette Bearcats (Northwest Conference) (1952–1971)
1952	Willamette	5–2–2	3–2	3rd	
1953	Willamette	2–5–1	2–2–1	3rd	
1954	Willamette	6–2	4–1	T–1st	
1955	Willamette	1–7	1–4	6th	
1956	Willamette	2–4–2	2–1–2	T–2nd	
1957	Willamette	5–2–2	3–1–1	3rd	
1958	Willamette	8–1	5–0	1st	
1959	Willamette	5–3–1	3–1–1	1st	
1960	Willamette	8–0	5–0	1st	
1961	Willamette	4–4	3–2	T–2nd	
1962	Willamette	6–3–1	3–1–1	T–2nd	
1963	Willamette	3–5	3–2	3rd	
1964	Willamette	5–3	2–3	4th	
1965	Willamette	6–1–1	4–1	2nd	
1966	Willamette	5–4	4–2	3rd	
1967	Willamette	7–2	5–1	T–1st	
1968	Willamette	9–1	6–0	1st	L NAIA Semifinal
1969	Willamette	2–7	1–5	T–6th	
1970	Willamette	4–4	3–3	T–4th	
1971	Willamette	5–4	4–2	T–1st	
Willamette:		98–64–10	66–34–6		
Total:		98–64–10			
National championship Conference title Conference division title or championship game berth
