= 1963 Lewis & Clark Pioneers football team =

American college football season

1963 Lewis & Clark Pioneers football

NWC champion
- Conference: Northwest Conference
- Record: 8–0 (5–0 NWC)
- Head coach: Joe Huston (17th season)

1963 Northwest Conference football standings
	Conf.					Overall
Team	W		L		T	W		L		T
No. 8 Lewis & Clark $	5	–	0	–	0	8	–	0	–	0
No. 16 Linfield	4	–	1	–	0	8	–	1	–	0
Willamette	3	–	2	–	0	3	–	5	–	0
Pacific (OR)	2	–	3	–	0	3	–	6	–	0
College of Idaho	1	–	4	–	0	3	–	6	–	0
Whitman	0	–	5	–	0	1	–	7	–	0
$ – Conference champion

The 1963 Lewis & Clark Pioneers football team was an American football team that represented Lewis & Clark College of Portland, Oregon, as a member of the Northwest Conference (NWC) during the 1963 NAIA football season. In their 17th year under head coach Joe Huston, the Pioneers compiled a perfect 8–0 record (5–0 in conference games), won the NWC championship, and outscored opponents by a total of 294 to 94.

Halfback Mickey Hergert was selected as a second-team player on the 1963 Little All-America college football team. Nine Lewis & Clark players were selected as first team players on the All-NWC football team: Hergert; quarterback Bill Henselman; offensive tackle Rick Wheatley; offensive guard Gary Boggs; defensive tackle Roger Paul; middle guard Mike Kostrba; linebackers Bob Reichert and Mike Gilbert; and defensive halfback Mike Gilbert.

The team played its home games at in Portland, Oregon.

== Schedule ==
Date	Opponent	Site	Result	Attendance	Source
September 21	Portland State*	Portland, OR	W 37–26		
September 28	at Chico State*	College Field; Chico, CA	W 16–14	3,300	
October 5	at Willamette	McCulloch Stadium; Salem, OR	W 41–13		
October 12	Linfield	Portland, OR	W 21–7		
October 19	Pacific Lutheran*	Portland, OR	W 63–27		
October 26	College of Idaho	Portland, OR	W 41–0		
November 2	at Whitman	Walla Walla, WA	W 40–0		
November 9	Pacific (OR)	Portland, OR	W 35–7		
*Non-conference game
