= John Godfrey (American football) =

American football player and coach (1921–2008)

Biographical details
- Born: August 13, 1921; Port Angeles, Washington, U.S.
- Died: September 14, 2008 (aged 87); Tualatin, Oregon, U.S.

Playing career
- 1942: Washington State
- 1946–1947: Washington State
- Position: Guard

Coaching career (HC unless noted)

Football
- 1948–1949: Punahou (HI) (line)
- 1950: Farrington HS (HI)
- 1952–1953: Punahou (HI)
- 1954–1955: Bellingham HS (WA)
- 1957–1959: Whittier (assistant)
- 1960–1979: Whittier

Track
- 1963: Whittier

Head coaching record
- Overall: 118–68–6 (college football)
- Tournaments: 0–1 (NAIA playoffs)

Accomplishments and honors

Championships
- Football; 9 SCIAC (1960–1964, 1967–1969, 1972)

John Henry "Tiger" Godfrey (August 13, 1921 – September 14, 2008) was an American football player and coach. He served as the head football coach at Whittier College in Whittier, California from 1960 to 1979, compiling a record of 118–68–6.

A native of Tacoma, Washington, Godfrey played college football at the State College of Washington—now known as Washington State University—Was a guard. He first lettered in 1942 during Babe Hollingbery's final year as head coach of the Washington State Cougars. Godfrey served as an infantryman in the United States Army during World War II, in New Guinea, the Philippines, and Japan. He returned to Washington State after the war and played two more seasons for the Cougars under head coach Phil Sarboe. Godfrey was co-captain of the 1947 Washington State Cougars football team and played in the Hula Bowl in 1948.

Godfrey began his coaching career in 1948 as an assistant football coach at the Punahou School in Honolulu. After two years as line coach at Punahou under head coach Fritz Minuth, Godfrey was appointed head football coach at Honolulu's Farrington High School. Godfrey spent 1951 on active military service duty and resumed coaching in 1952 as head football coach at Punahou. Godfrey returned to the Washington in 1954 as head football coach at Bellingham High School in Bellingham. He moved on to Whittier in 1957 and served as an assistant football coach under Don Coryell for three seasons before succeeding him as head coach in 1960.

Godfrey died on September 14, 2008, in Tualatin, Oregon, from complications of Parkinson's disease.

== Head coaching record ==
=== College football ===
Year	Team	Overall	Conference	Standing	Bowl/playoffs
Pomona/Whittier Poets (Southern California Intercollegiate Athletic Conference) (1960–1979)
1960	Whittier	8–2	4–1	T–1st	
1961	Whittier	9–1	4–0	1st	L NAIA Semifinal
1962	Whittier	8–1	3–0	1st	
1963	Whittier	6–2–1	2–1	T–1st	
1964	Whittier	9–1	4–0	1st	
1965	Whittier	4–5	2–2	T–3rd	
1966	Whittier	3–5–2	3–1–1	T–2nd	
1967	Whittier	4–6	4–1	1st	
1968	Whittier	5–4	4–1	1st	
1969	Whittier	5–5	4–0	1st	
1970	Whittier	4–6	2–2	T–3rd	
1971	Whittier	5–4–1	3–2	T–2nd	
1972	Whittier	7–2–1	5–0	1st	
1973	Whittier	6–3	3–2	T–2nd	
1974	Whittier	7–2	4–1	2nd	
1975	Whittier	3–6–1	2–3	T–3rd	
1976	Whittier	6–4	2–3	T–4th	
1977	Whittier	8–2	4–1	2nd	
1978	Whittier	6–3	3–2	3rd	
1979	Whittier	5–4	3–2	T–2nd	
Whittier:		118–68–6	65–25–1		
Total:		118–68–6			
National championship Conference title Conference division title or championship game berth
