= 1961 Sacramento State Hornets football team =

American college football season

1961 Sacramento State Hornets football
- Conference: Far Western Conference
- Record: 4–5 (2–3 FWC)
- Head coach: Ray Clemons (1st season)
- Home stadium: Charles C. Hughes Stadium

1961 Far Western Conference football standings
	Conf.					Overall
Team	W		L		T	W		L		T
No. 13/16 Humboldt State +	4	–	1	–	0	8	–	2	–	0
San Francisco State +	4	–	1	–	0	8	–	2	–	0
UC Davis	3	–	2	–	0	5	–	4	–	0
Nevada	2	–	3	–	0	5	–	4	–	0
Sacramento State	2	–	3	–	0	4	–	5	–	0
Chico State	0	–	5	–	0	4	–	6	–	0
+ – Conference co-champions; Rankings from NAIA poll and UPI small college poll

The 1961 Sacramento State Hornets football team was an American football team that represented Sacramento State College (now known as California State University, Sacramento) as a member of the Far Western Conference (FWC) during the 1961 college football season. In their first year under head coach Ray Clemons, the Hornets compiled a 4–5 record (2–3 in conference games), tied for fourth place in the FWC, and were outscored by a total of 117 to 106. \ The team's statistical leaders included quarterback Wayne Paulk (644 passing yards), fullback Gene Reyes (462 rushing yards), and end Jim Curtis (201 receiving yards). Three Sacramento State players received first-team honors on the 1961 All-Far Western Conference football team: Adolphus McGee at back; John Moreno at linebacker; and Gil Garcia at wingback.

The team played its home games at Charles C. Hughes Stadium in Sacramento, California.

== Schedule ==
Date	Time	Opponent	Site	Result	Attendance	Source
September 16		Pepperdine*	Charles C. Hughes Stadium; Sacramento, CA	W 21–0		
September 22	8:00 p.m.	at Cal Poly Pomona*	L.A. State Stadium; Los Angeles, CA	L 12–27	1,500	
September 30		at Long Beach State*	Veterans Stadium; Long Beach, CA	L 18–21	4,400	
October 7		Southern Oregon*	Charles C. Hughes Stadium; Sacramento, CA	W 25–6	3,000	
October 14		No. 2 Humboldt State	Charles C. Hughes Stadium; Sacramento, CA	W 19–7	6,000	
October 21		at Chico State	College Field; Chico, CA	W 14–10	6,600	
November 4		Nevada	Charles C. Hughes Stadium; Sacramento, CA	L 8–14	6,500	
November 11		San Francisco State	Charles C. Hughes Stadium; Sacramento, CA	L 0–7	4,282	
November 17		at UC Davis	Aggie Field; Davis, CA (rivalry)	L 0–14		
*Non-conference game; Rankings from AP Poll released prior to the game; All times are in Pacific time

== Statistics ==
Junior fullback Gene Reyes led the team in rushing, tallying 462 yards on 101 carries for a 4.6-yard average. Adolphus McGee ranked second with 450 yards.

Senior quarterback Wayne Paulk completed 46 of 112 passes for 644 yards. Paulk also ranked third on the team with 194 rushing yards on 77 carries for a 2.5-yard average.

Senior end Jim Curtis led the team in receiving with 12 catches for 201 yards. Adolphus McGee caught 14 passes for 155 yards, and Gary Kelly followed with 11 catches for 149 yards.

== Awards and honors ==
Three Sacramento State players received first-team honors on the 1961 All-Far Western Conference football team: Adolphus McGee at back (offense); John Moreno at linebacker (defense); and Gil Garcia at wingback (defense). Three others were named to the second team: Ed Auston at tackle (offense); John Moreno at guard (offense); and Gary Vincent at end (defense).
