= Consortium on Financing Higher Education =

Higher education finance organization

Formed in the mid-1970s, the Consortium on Financing Higher Education (COFHE) was an unincorporated, voluntary, institutionally-supported organization of 32 highly selective, private liberal arts colleges and universities, all of which were committed to meeting the full demonstrated financial need of admitted students. The Consortium officially ended its operations on December 31, 2025.

The Consortium’s data collection, research, and policy analysis had focused on matters pertaining to access, affordability, and assessment, particularly as they relate to undergraduate education, admissions, financial aid, and the financing of higher education.

The organization's officially stated goals were as follows:

- Collecting from and reporting to the member institutions historical data relating to admission, financial aid, and costs.
- Conducting periodic and special studies, as desired, to investigate aspects of institutional policy and administrative practices.
- Convening meetings of the membership for general policy and research discussions of broad interest and import.
- Monitoring developments within the federal government and the private sector as these developments relate to the financing of higher education, with specific emphasis on financial aid and student loan programs.
- Cooperating and coordinating with other organizations concerned with higher education.

Prior to closure, COFHE had two home offices, one at the Massachusetts Institute of Technology in Cambridge, Massachusetts and one at Johns Hopkins's Paul H. Nitze School of Advanced International Studies in the District of Columbia.

== Member institutions prior to close ==
- Amherst College
- Barnard College
- Bowdoin College
- Bryn Mawr College
- California Institute of Technology
- Carleton College
- Columbia University
- Cornell University
- Duke University
- Georgetown University
- Harvard University
- Haverford College
- Johns Hopkins University
- Macalester College
- Massachusetts Institute of Technology
- Middlebury College
- Mount Holyoke College
- Northwestern University
- Oberlin College
- Pomona College
- Smith College
- Stanford University
- Swarthmore College
- Trinity College
- University of Pennsylvania
- University of Rochester
- Vassar College
- Washington University in St. Louis
- Wellesley College
- Wesleyan University
- Williams College
- Yale University

== See also ==
- Kristine Dillon, COFHE president 2002-2018
