= 1961 Pittsburg State Gorillas football team =

American college football season

1961 Pittsburg State Gorillas football
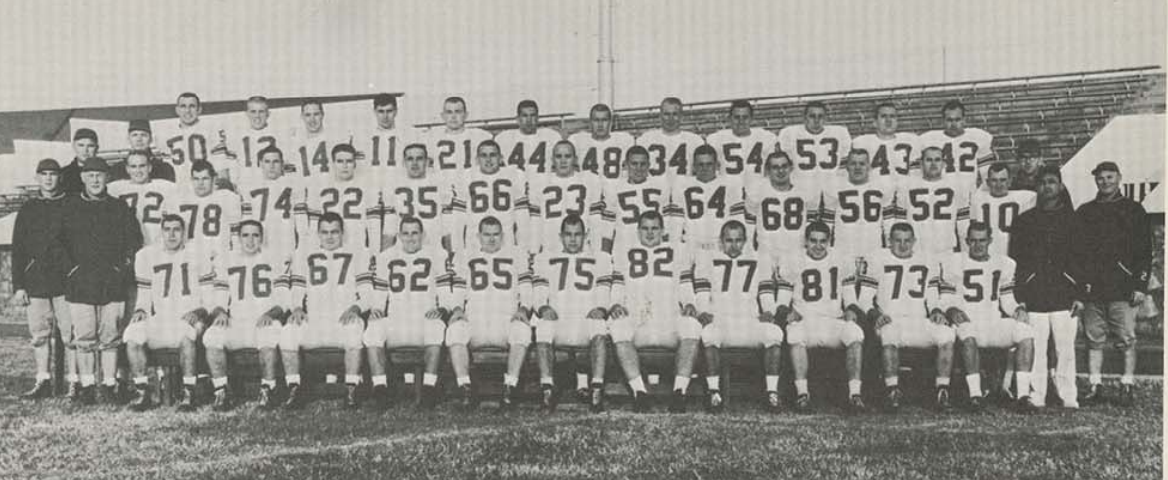

NAIA national champion; AP small college national champion; UPI small college national champion; CIC champion

Camellia Bowl, W 12–7 vs. Linfield
- Conference: Central Intercollegiate Conference
- Record: 11–0 (5–0 CIC)
- Head coach: Carnie Smith (13th season)
- MVP: Garry Snadon
- Captains: Richard Beal; Tom Gosch; Lewis Holmes
- Home stadium: Brandenburg Stadium

1961 Central Intercollegiate Conference football standings
	Conf.					Overall
Team	W		L		T	W		L		T
No. 1/1 Pittsburg State $^	5	–	0	–	0	11	–	0	–	0
Omaha	4	–	1	–	0	6	–	3	–	0
Fort Hays State	3	–	2	–	0	4	–	4	–	1
St. Benedict's	2	–	3	–	0	2	–	7	–	0
Emporia State	1	–	4	–	0	1	–	8	–	0
Washburn	0	–	5	–	0	3	–	6	–	0
$ – Conference champion; ^ – NAIA playoff participant; Rankings from NAIA poll and AP small college poll

The 1961 Pittsburg State Gorillas football team was an American football team that represented Kansas State College of Pittsburg (later renamed Pittsburg State University) as a member of the Central Intercollegiate Conference (CIC) during the 1961 college football season. In their 13th season under head coach Carnie Smith, the Gorillas compiled an 11–0 record (5–0 in conference games) and were ranked No. 1 the final 1961 small college football rankings issued by both the Associated Press (AP) and United Press International (UPI). During the regular season, Pittsburg State shut out seven of nine opponents and outscored all opponents by a total of 299 to 25. The Gorillas then advanced to the NAIA playoffs, defeating Northern State (28–14) in a semifinal game and Linfield (12–7) in the NAIA national championship game known as the Camellia Bowl.

The team was led by quarterback Phil Vogrin, fullback Gary Snadon, and halfback Bill Presson. Vogrin broke the school's single-season total offense record; Snadon led the team in scoring and received first-team honors on the 1961 Little All-America college football team; and Presson was the team's leading rusher. Three of the team's linemen received first-team honors on the 1961 NAIA All-America team: center Jerry Archer and tackles Richard Beal and Harlan Hess. Carnie Smith received the NAIA's Coach of the Year award. The team's assistant coaches were Ray Laing, Tom Lester, Joe Murphy, Al Ortolani, and Sam Carter. The team played its home games at Brandenberg Stadium in Pittsburg, Kansas.

== Schedule ==
Date	Opponent	Rank	Site	Result	Attendance	Source
September 16	at Southwest Missouri State*		Springfield, MO	W 21–0		
September 23	Central Missouri State*		Brandenburg Stadium; Pittsburg, KS	W 47–0		
September 30	at Missouri–Rolla*		Rolla, MO	W 20–0		
October 7	at Northwest Missouri State*	No. 7	Maryville, MO	W 35–0		
October 14	St. Benedict's	No. 4	Brandenburg Stadium; Pittsburg, KS	W 26–0		
October 21	Fort Hays State^{†}	No. 1	Brandenburg Stadium; Pittsburg, KS	W 41–7	13,000	
October 28	at Washburn	No. 1	Topeka, KS	W 40–0	5,500	
November 4	at Emporia State	No. 1	Emporia, KS	W 35–0		
November 11	Omaha	No. 1	Brandenburg Stadium; Pittsburg, KS	W 34–18	10,000	
November 23	Northern State*	No. 1	Pittsburg, KS (NAIA semifinal)	W 28–14		
December 9	vs. No. 7 Linfield*	No. 1	Charles C. Hughes Stadium; Sacramento, CA (NAIA championship game—Camellia Bowl)	W 12–7	10,000	
*Non-conference game; ^{†}Homecoming; Rankings from AP Poll released prior to the game

== NAIA playoffs ==
=== Semifinal ===
After completing its undefeated regular season, Pittsburg State was one of four teams invited to participate in the NAIA playoffs. On November 23, Pittsburg State hosted the undefeated Northern State Wolves of South Dakota in an NAIA semifinal playoff game at Brandenburg Stadium in Pittsburg. In nine regular season games, Pittsburg State had held opponents to an average of 2.8 points per game. Northern State's offense pushed through Pittsburg State's line for 235 rushing yards and 14 points, but the Wolves lost three fumbles in the second half, each resulting in Pittsburg State touchdowns. On offense, Pittsburg's star fullback Gary Snadon rushed for 90 yards and scored three touchdowns. After the game, coach Carnie Smith credited Snadon with having "played his finest game today" and stated that Snadon "got the necessary yardage whenever we needed it."

=== Camellia Bowl ===
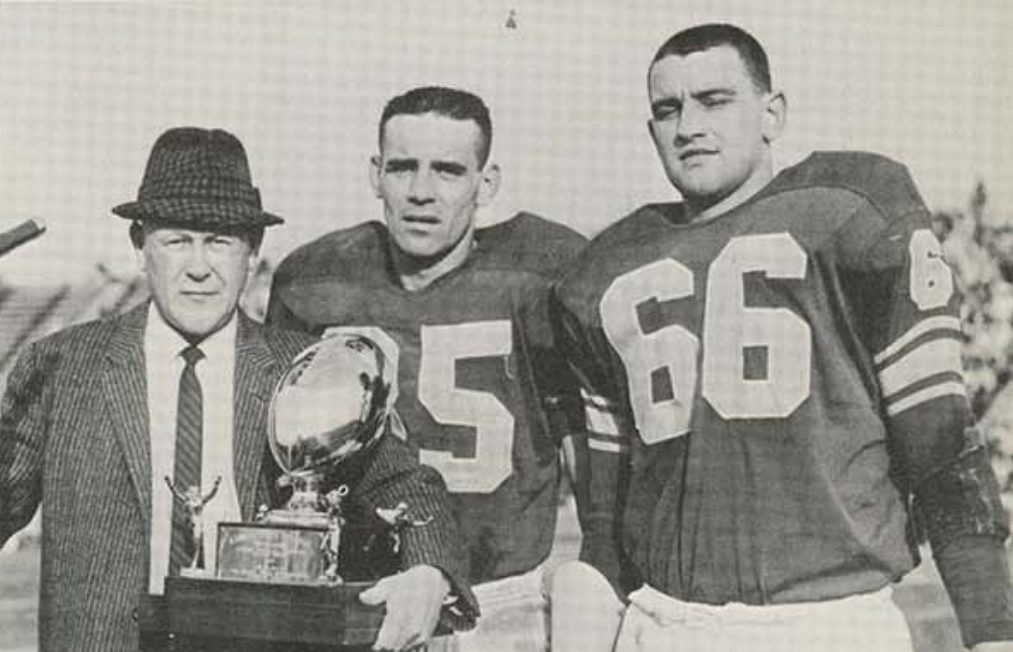
Carnie Smith, Gary Snadon and Harlan Hess accept UPI trophy at Camellia Bowl

On December 9, Pittsburg State defeated the Linfield Wildcats of Oregon, 12–7, in the NAIA national championship game known as the Camellia Bowl in Sacramento, California. On the first play from scrimmage, Pittsburg State halfback Bob Fulton took the ball on a pitchout from quarterback Phil Vogrin and ran around the right end for 64 yards and a touchdown. The extra point kick was blocked by Linfield middle guard Tom Buckner. After the opening play, neither team was able to score for the remainder of the first half or in the third quarter. Linfield intercepted two Pittsburg passes in the first half. Late in the second quarter, Linfield drove 65 yards to the Pittsburg 22-yard line, but the drive ended with an interception by Pittsburg's Gene John.

In the fourth quarter, Linfield drove deep into Pittsburg territory, but Pittsburg defensive halfback Archie Ringgenberg intercepted a Linfield pass and returned it 89 yards to the Linfield six-years line. Two plays later, Gary Snadon scored the game-winning touchdown on a one-yard run. The extra point kick failed again. Linfield then scored a touchdown with 4:08 remaining in the game and completed two passes in a final drive to the Pittsburg 40-yard line but the drive ended when the Gorillas sacked Linfield's quarterback on fourth down with 1:22 remaining in the game. Pittsburg quarterback Phil Vogrin completed five of 12 passes for 42 yards and was selected as the outstanding back and outstanding player of the game.

== Awards and honors ==
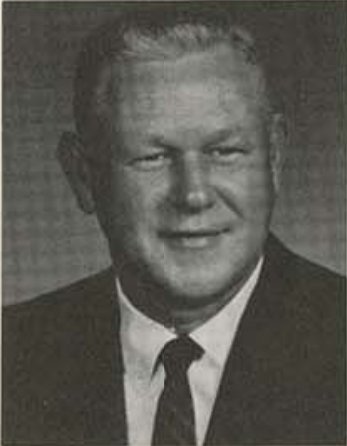
NAIA Coach of the Year Carnie Smith

- Carnie Smith was named "Coach of the Year" by the National Association of Intercollegiate Athletics (NAIA). Smith compiled a 116-52-6 record in 18 years as Pittsburg State's head coach.
- Fullback Gary Snadon received first-team honors on the 1961 Little All-America college football team. Snadon also won the W.G. Parrott Award as the Pittsburg State's most valuable player.
- Center/linebacker Jerry Archer (6'4", 245 pounds) and tackles Richard Beal (6', 225 pounds) and Harlan Hess (6'3", 220 pounds) were selected as first-team NAIA All-Americans.
- Seven Pittsburg State players received first-team honors on the 1961 All-CIC football team: Phil Vogrin at quarterback; Gary Snadon at fullback; Bruce Roach at end; Jerry Archer at center; Richard Beal and Harlan Hess at tackle; and Eddie Carter at guard. Three others received second-team honors: Bill Presson at halfback; Tom Gosch at end; and Bill Beeson at guard.
- Five members of the 1961 team have been inducted into the Pittsburg State Hall of Fame: quarterback Phil Vogrin (1988); fullback Gary Snadon (1989); tackle Harlan Hess (1990); center Jerry Archer (1992); tackle Richard Beal (1993); and halfback Bill Presson (2019). The first five were also named to Pittsburg State's 100th anniversary all-time football team.
- Richard Beal, Tom Gosch, and Lewis Holmes were selected at the team captains.

== Statistics ==
- The team recorded seven shutouts during the 1961 season. This remains a Pittsburg State single-season record.
- Halfback Bill Presson led the team in rushing with 640 yards and also established the school's career punt return record with an average of 17.25 yards per return. Presson also played on Pittsburg State's 1957 NAIA championship team.
- Quarterback Phil Vogrin led the team during the nine-game regular season in passing, completing 64 of 108 passes for 902 yards, seven touchdowns, and three interceptions. Vogrin also tallied 241 rushing yards in the regular season on 60 carries and led the team in total offense, setting a new school record with 1,143 yards. He also converted 39 of 47 extra point kicks.
- Fullback Gary Snadon led the team in scoring with 15 touchdowns for 90 points scored.

== Player gallery ==
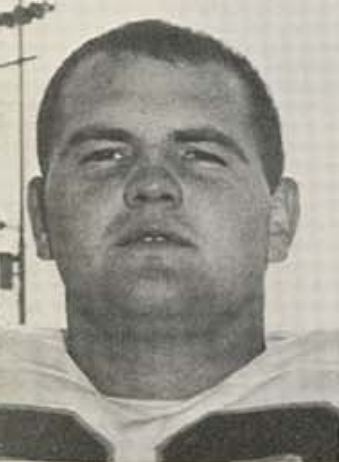
NAIA All-American center Jerry Archer

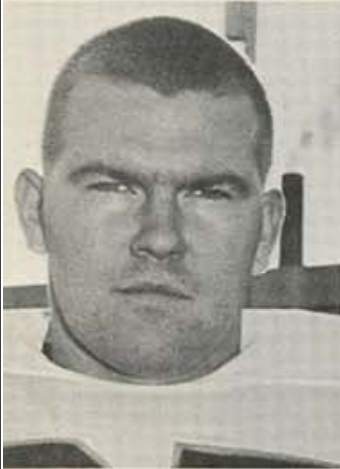
NAIA All-American tackle Richard Beal

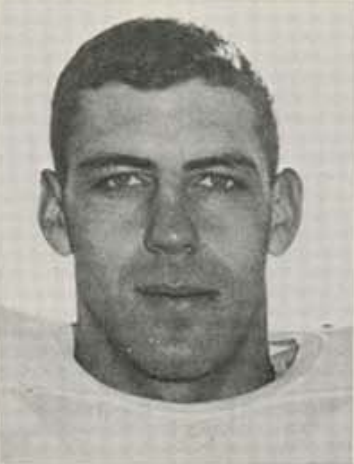
Second-team All-CIC guard Bill Beeson

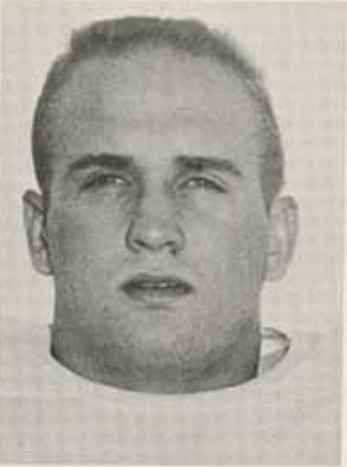
All-CIC guard Ed Carter

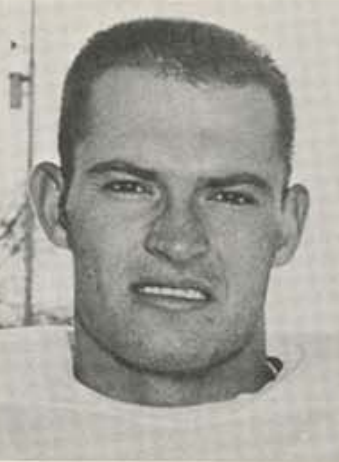
Co-captain Tom Gosch

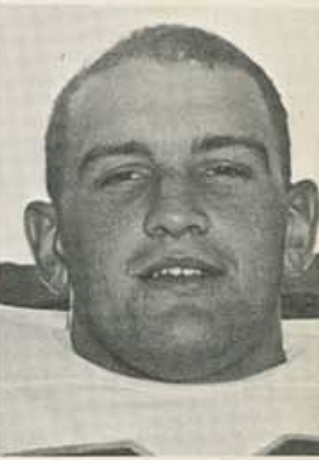
NAIA All-American tackle Harlan Hess

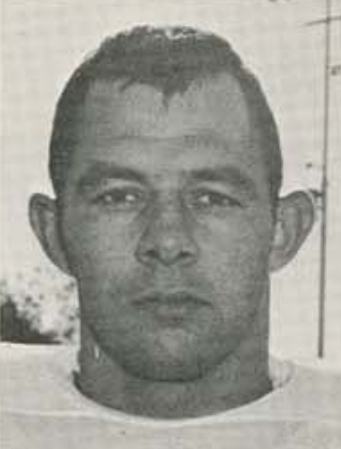
Co-captain Lewis Holmes

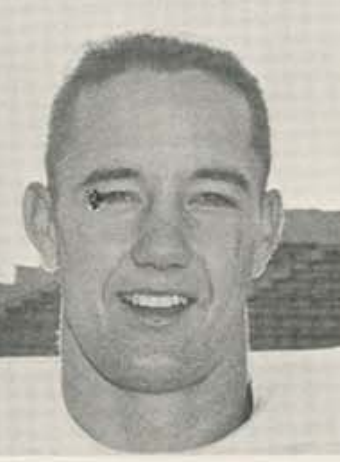
Halfback and rushing leader Bill Presson

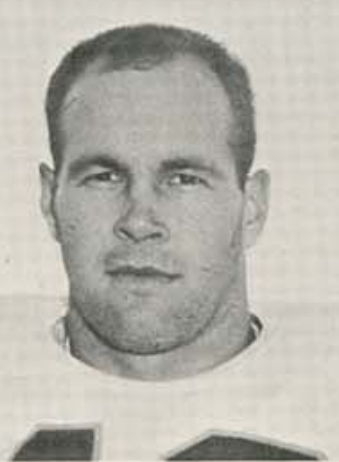
Defensive halfback Archie Ringgenberg

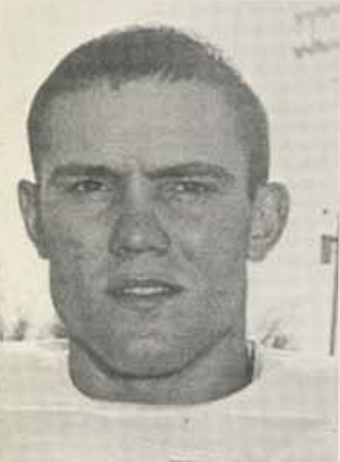
All-CIC end Bruce Roach

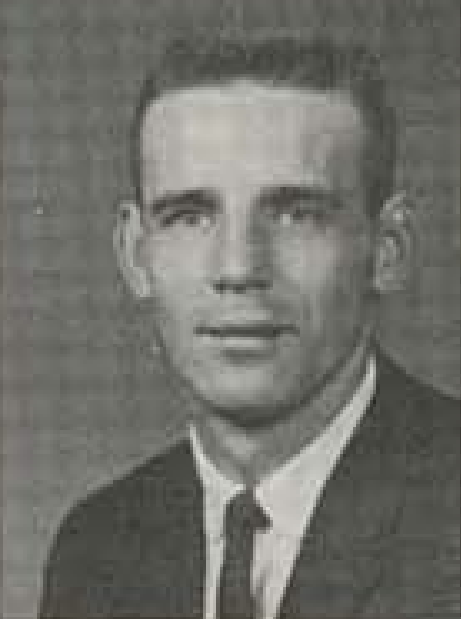
All-American fullback and MVP Garry Snadon

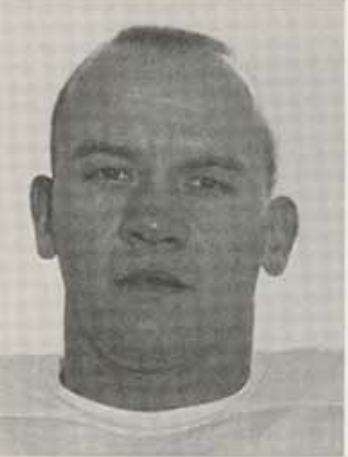
Quarterback Phil Vogrin
