= 1961 UC Davis Aggies football team =

American college football season

1961 UC Davis Aggies football
- Conference: Far Western Conference
- Record: 5–4 (3–2 FWC)
- Head coach: Will Lotter (6th season)
- Captain: Carl Ehret
- Home stadium: Aggie Field

1961 Far Western Conference football standings
	Conf.					Overall
Team	W		L		T	W		L		T
No. 13/16 Humboldt State +	4	–	1	–	0	8	–	2	–	0
San Francisco State +	4	–	1	–	0	8	–	2	–	0
UC Davis	3	–	2	–	0	5	–	4	–	0
Nevada	2	–	3	–	0	5	–	4	–	0
Sacramento State	2	–	3	–	0	4	–	5	–	0
Chico State	0	–	5	–	0	4	–	6	–	0
+ – Conference co-champions; Rankings from NAIA poll and UPI small college poll

The 1961 UC Davis Aggies football team, also known as the "Cal Aggies", was an American football team that represented the University of California, Davis as a member of the Far Western Conference (FWC) during the 1961 college football season. In their sixth year under head coach Will Lotter, the Aggies compiled a 5–4 record (3–2 in conference games), finished third in the FWC, and outscored opponents by a total of 173 to 111.

The Aggies played home games at Aggie Field in Davis, California.

== Schedule ==
Date	Opponent	Site	Result	Attendance	Source
September 22	Santa Clara*	Aggie Field; Davis, CA	W 21–14		
September 30	at Whittier*	Hadley Field; Whittier, CA	L 8–20		
October 7	UC Riverside*^{†}	Aggie Field; Davis, CA	W 40–12	1,600–3,300	
October 14	at Nevada	Mackay Stadium (Note: This stadium is the predecessor to the current Mackay Stadium, which was opened for the 1966 season.); Reno, NV	W 36–12	4,500	
October 21	at Humboldt State	Redwood Bowl; Arcata, CA	L 18–20	5,500	
October 28	at San Francisco State	Cox Stadium; San Francisco, CA	L 8–13	4,500	
November 4	vs. UC Santa Barbara (Note: The game against UC Santa Barbara was part of an "All-UC Doubleheader" that was held annually from 1948 to 1963. The other game of the double-header was California vs. UCLA. The games were always held at the home stadium of either Cal or UCLA.)*	Los Angeles Memorial Coliseum; Los Angeles, CA	L 0–13	2,000	
November 10	Chico State	Aggie Field; Davis, CA	W 28–7	4,000	
November 17	Sacramento State	Aggie Field; Davis, CA (rivalry)	W 14–0		
*Non-conference game; ^{†}Homecoming

== Statistics ==
The Aggies tallied 2,019 yards of total offense (224.4 per game), consisting of 1,450 rushing yards (161.6 per game) and 569 passing yards (63.2 per game). On defense, they gave up 2,435 yards (270.5 per game) including 1,531 rushing yards (170.1 per game) and 904 passing yards (100.3 per game).

Quarterback Dick Carriere completed 58 of 124 passes for 569 yards with four touchdowns and five interceptions. He also had 266 rushing yards and led the team with 835 yards of total offense. He also led the team in scoring with 34 points (three touchdowns, 11 extra point kicks, one field goal). Carriere was also the team's punter, averaging 33.9 yards on 49 punts.

The team's rushing leaders were halfbacks Terry Haynie (345 yards, 58 carries) and Mike Doyle (291 yards, 71 carries).

The team's leading receivers were end Ray DiGuilio (24 receptions, 190 yards) and halfback Ken Gardner (six receptions, 88 yards).

== Awards and honors ==
Five Cal Aggies players were selected as first-team hoorees on the 1961 All-Far Western Conference football team: back Bob Foster (offense); tackle Carl Ehret (offense); center Neil Laughlin (offense); end Jim Hanie (defense); and tackle Dick Williams (defense). Two others were named to the second team: linebacker Marlin Davis; and halfback Bill Moore (defense). Quarterback Dick Carriere and halfback Ron Sbragia received honorable mention.

== Players ==
- Linn Anderson (#59), guard (defense), 200 pounds
- Gary Carlson (#17), safety, 170 pounds
- Dick Carriere (#23), quarterback, 180 pounds
- Jim Clay (#83), end, 190 pounds
- Skip Davies (#36), halfback (defense), 200 pounds
- Carl Ehret (#75), tackle, 220 pounds
- Jim Ferrerier (#65), guard, 190 pounds
- Bob Foster (#34), fullback, 190 pounds
- Tom Giacomini (#81), end, 195 pounds
- Jim Haynie (#57), tackle (defense), 195 pounds
- Gordon Huntley (#64), guard, 195 pounds
- Gary Judd (#24), halfback, 160 pounds
- Larry McClish (#85), end (defense), 210 pounds
- Max Miller (#20), safety, 160 pounds
- Bill Moore (#40), middle linebacker, 195 pounds
- Bob Nichols (#72), tackle (defense), 220 pounds
- Terry Oldershaw, end (defense), 180 pounds
- Bill Raische (#26), halfback (defense), 170 pounds
- Ron Sbragla (#22), halfback, 175 pounds
- Roger Swearingen, (#58), center, 205 pounds
- Dale Wesihahn (#71), tackle, 212 pounds
- Dick Williams (#73), guard (defense), 195 pounds
