= Paul Durham (American football) =

American football and basketball coach (1913–2007)

Biographical details
- Born: October 18, 1913; Portland, Oregon, U.S.
- Died: June 22, 2007 (aged 93); Honolulu, Hawaii, U.S.

Playing career

Football
- c. 1935: Linfield

Basketball
- c. 1935: Linfield

Coaching career (HC unless noted)

Football
- ?–1947: Franklin HS (OR)
- 1948–1967: Linfield

Basketball
- 1949–1952: Linfield

Administrative career (AD unless noted)
- 1968–1975: Hawaii

Head coaching record
- Overall: 121–51–10 (college football); 31–48 (college basketball)
- Tournaments: Football; 2–3 (NAIA playoffs)

Accomplishments and honors

Championships
- Football; 7 NWC (1956–1957, 1961–1962, 1964–1965, 1967)

Awards
- Football; NAIA Coach of the Year (1962)

Paul H. Durham (October 18, 1913 – June 22, 2007) was an American football and basketball coach and a college athletics administrator. He served as the head football coach at Linfield College in McMinnville, Oregon from 1948 to 1967, compiling a record of 121–51–10 . During his tenure, he began a string of consecutive winning seasons at Linfield that continues to this day. Durham was also Linfield's head men's basketball coach from 1949 to 1952, tallying a mark of 31–48. He concluded his career as the athletic director at the University of Hawaii at Manoa.

As a student at Linfield, Durham competed in basketball, football, and track and field.

== Head coaching record ==
=== College football ===
| Year | Team | Overall | Conference | Standing | Bowl/playoffs |
|---|---|---|---|---|---|
Linfield Wildcats (Northwest Conference) (1948–1967)
| 1948 | Linfield | 3–6 | 1–5 | 6th | |
| 1949 | Linfield | 4–4 | 2–3 | 4th | |
| 1950 | Linfield | 6–3 | 3–2 | T–2nd | |
| 1951 | Linfield | 3–3–3 | 1–3–1 | T–4th | |
| 1952 | Linfield | 5–3–1 | 2–3 | 4th | |
| 1953 | Linfield | 5–4 | 3–2 | 2nd | |
| 1954 | Linfield | 3–6 | 1–4 | T–4th | |
| 1955 | Linfield | 3–6 | 2–3 | T–3rd | |
| 1956 | Linfield | 6–1–2 | 3–1–1 | 1st | |
| 1957 | Linfield | 8–1 | 5–0 | 1st | |
| 1958 | Linfield | 7–1–1 | 3–1–1 | 2nd | |
| 1959 | Linfield | 4–3–1 | 1–2–2 | 6th | |
| 1960 | Linfield | 7–2 | 4–1 | 2nd | |
| 1961 | Linfield | 10–1 | 5–0 | 1st | L NAIA Championship |
| 1962 | Linfield | 8–0–1 | 5–0 | 1st | |
| 1963 | Linfield | 8–1 | 4–1 | 2nd | |
| 1964 | Linfield | 8–1–1 | 5–0 | 1st | L NAIA Semifinal |
| 1965 | Linfield | 8–2 | 5–0 | 1st | L NAIA Championship |
| 1966 | Linfield | 7–2 | 5–1 | 2nd | |
| 1967 | Linfield | 8–1 | 5–1 | T–1st | |
| Linfield: | | 121–51–10 | 65–33–5 | | |
| Total: | | 121–51–10 | | | |
National championship Conference title Conference division title or championship game berth
