= Willie Simpson (American football) =

American football fullback

- Simpson in 1960

No. 39
- Position: Fullback

Personal information
- Born: March 11, 1938; Oklahoma, U.S.
- Died: August 26, 1982 (aged 44); Atlanta, Georgia, U.S.

Career information
- High school: Edison
- College: San Francisco (1959–1960)

Career history
- Pittsburgh Steelers (1961)*; Oakland Raiders (1962–1963)
- * Offseason or practice squad member only
- Stats at Pro Football Reference

William Lee Simpson (March 11, 1938 – August 26, 1982) was an American professional football fullback. He played for the Oakland Raiders of the American Football League (AFL).

== Life and career ==
Simpson was born in Oklahoma, the son of William Simpson Sr. and Lilie Payne. He attended Edison High School in Stockton, California. He played college football for the San Francisco State Gators at San Francisco State University from 1959 to 1960.

In 1961, Simpson joined the Pittsburgh Steelers of the National Football League (NFL), and he was released from the team in September 1961. In January 1962, he joined the Oakland Raiders of the American Football League (AFL). He started one game for the team, and he played in ten games during the 1962 AFL season, but was released from the team in September 1962. He later returned to the Oakland Raiders, but was released again in August 1963.

== Death ==
Simpson died on August 26, 1982, in Atlanta, Georgia, at the age of 44.
