= Whittier College =

Private liberal arts college in Whittier, California, US

- Former name: Whittier Academy (1887–1901)
- Motto: Lux, Poesis, Veritas, Pax, Amor Eruditionis
- Motto in English: Light, Creativity, Truth, Peace, and Love of Knowledge
- Type: Private liberal arts college
- Established: 1887; 139 years ago
- Religious affiliation: Secular (historically Quaker)
- Academic affiliations: Oberlin Group, CLAC
- Endowment: $112.9 million (2019)
- President: Kristine Dillon
- Faculty: 103 full-time, 36 part-time (Fall 2022)
- Students: 797 (2025)
- Location: Whittier, California, U.S. 33.9780°N 118.0296°W
- Campus: Suburban, 75 acres (30 ha)
- Colors: Purple & gold
- Nickname: Poets
- Sporting affiliations: NCAA Division III – SCIAC
- Mascot: Johnny Poet
- Website: whittier.edu

Whittier College is a private liberal arts college in Whittier, California, United States. Founded by Quakers in 1887, it is a federally-designated Hispanic-Serving Institution. As of fall 2025, it had 797 undergraduate and graduate students. Whittier athletic teams compete in NCAA Division III.

== History ==
Whittier College was founded in 1887 by members of the Religious Society of Friends (Quakers) and named after the poet and abolitionist John Greenleaf Whittier. Although the institution no longer has a formal Quaker affiliation, it maintains a tradition of emphasizing social responsibility and community engagement.

== Academics ==
Whittier College is a four-year liberal arts institution. The school enrolls around 800 undergraduates and has just over 100 full-time faculty members. It offers over 30 majors and 30 minors in 23 disciplines. Whittier offers one graduate degree – a master's degree in education. Its most popular undergraduate majors, based on 2021 graduates, were

- Business Administration and Management (62)
- Exercise Science and Kinesiology (52)
- Biology/Biological Sciences (40)
- Psychology (38)
- Social Sciences (29)
- English Language and Literature (24)

=== Whittier Law School ===
Whittier Law School was located on a satellite campus in Costa Mesa, California. It started in the Hancock Park section of Los Angeles in 1966 as Beverly Law School. In 1975, Beverly College joined Whittier with the law school, moving to Costa Mesa in 1997. Whittier Law School has 4,500 alumni practicing in 48 states and 14 countries. The school was accredited by the American Bar Association (ABA) beginning in 1978 and was a member of the Association of American Law Schools (AALS) beginning 1987.

On April 19, 2017, the law school announced that it would stop admitting students and begin the process of shutting down. The school ceased operations in July 2020.

Academic rankings

Liberal arts
- U.S. News & World Report: 95 (tie) of 185
- Washington Monthly: 64 of 199

National
- Forbes: 430 of 500

Student body composition as of May 2, 2022
Race and ethnicity	Total
Hispanic	53%
Asian	7%
Foreign national	4%
White	23%
Black	5%
Other (Note: Other consists of Multiracial Americans & those who prefer to not say.)	7%
Economic diversity
Low-income (Note: The percentage of students who received an income-based federal Pell grant intended for low-income students.)	36%
Affluent (Note: The percentage of students who are a part of the American middle class at the bare minimum.)	74%

== Athletics ==
Whittier athletics monogram

The Whittier Poets compete in the Southern California Intercollegiate Athletic Conference (SCIAC) of NCAA Division III. The school has fielded sports teams for over 100 years. Its current teams include men's and women's basketball, cross country, soccer, swimming and diving, tennis, track and field, lacrosse and water polo, women's softball and volleyball, and men's baseball and golf. In November 2022, Whittier announced that it was discontinuing its football team, men's lacrosse, and men's and women's golf. After community input, the Board of Trustees voted to reinstate the Football program, which is slated to return in the 2026-27 academic year, after alumni had raised more than $800,000 to support its revitalization.

The history of the Whittier football program began in 1907, and since the inception of the SCIAC in 1915, the Poets have won 26 conference titles. From 1957 to 1964, Whittier won eight straight SCIAC football titles under the direction of coaches George Allen (1951–1956), Don Coryell (1957–1959), and John Godfrey (1960–1979). Their most recent championships came back-to-back in 1997 and 1998. Twenty-three Poets have earned All-American honors, the most recent coming in 2007. The football program plays out of Newman Memorial Field, which seats 7,000. Whittier maintained a century-long football rivalry with Occidental Tigers. The two schools play for the shoes of 1939 All-American Myron Claxton.

The Whittier men's lacrosse program was established in 1980. In 1980, the Poets became a member of the Western Collegiate Lacrosse League (WCLL). From 1980 to 1999, Whittier won ten championships. In 1990, they were recognized by the NCAA but continued to compete in the WCLL. The Poets were the team to beat throughout the 1990s, and it was not until 2000 that Whittier decided to make their mark on the national scene by leaving the WCLL and focusing on being selected for the NCAA tournament. On November 15, 2022, it was announced that Whittier College would discontinue its men's lacrosse program after the conclusion of their season.

The Whittier men's and women's swimming and diving teams earned Academic All-American status—the women for the fourth straight year and the men for the first time after the College Swimming Coaches Association of America (CSCAA) announced the programs who achieved this honor for the 2015 Fall Semester. Five hundred forty-seven swimming and diving teams representing 354 colleges and universities have been named College Swimming Coaches Association of America (CSCAA) Scholar All-American Teams. The awards recognize teams with a grade point average of 3.0 or higher during the 2015 fall semester.

The termination of football, lacrosse, and golf in the fall of 2022 was greeted with controversy and strong community input. After fundraisers by alumni generated over $814,000 in donations, the football program was revived starting with the 2026 season.

=== Notable coaches ===
- George Allen- head football coach for the Poets from 1951 to 1956; former NFL head coach and a member of the Pro Football Hall of Fame.
- Tim Atkins- assistant coach for Poets football from 2004-2005; current safeties coach for Tampa Bay Buccaneers.
- Jerry Burns- assistant coach for Poets football team in 1952; former head coach Minnesota Vikings of the NFL.
- Leo B. Calland- former college football and basketball coach; highest winning percentage USC basketball history.
- Greg Carlson- head football coach for the Poets from 2003–2005.
- Don Coryell- head football coach for the Poets from 1957 to 1959; first and only coach to win at least 100 games at both the collegiate level and in the NFL.
- Ty Knott- former assistant coach for the Poets; former NFL assistant coach with the Jacksonville Jaguars, New Orleans Saints, and Green Bay Packers.
- Duval Love- offensive line coach for the Poets in 2008; former NFL offensive lineman.
- Samie Parker- wide receivers coach for the Poets in 2019; former NFL wide receiver.
- Omarr Smith- defensive backs coach for the Poets in 2004; former defensive back for the San Jose SaberCats of the Arena Football League
- Wallace Newman- head football coach for the Poets from 1929 to 1950; American Indian Tribal leader and mentor to future President of the United States Richard Nixon
- Hugh Mendez- former head football (1980–89) and baseball coach (1971–87) for Poets; former head coach in Austrian Football League, German Football League and other European leagues.

== Notable people ==
Notable alumni include 37th U.S. President Richard Nixon; actress Andrea Barber, known from the television comedy Full House and Fuller House; video blogger Cassey Ho; actors and brothers Geoff Stults, and George Stults; and author Jessamyn West. Notable faculty of Whittier College include former presidents Mary Chawner Woody and Kristine Dillon; and violinist Ruth Haroldson.

== Gallery ==
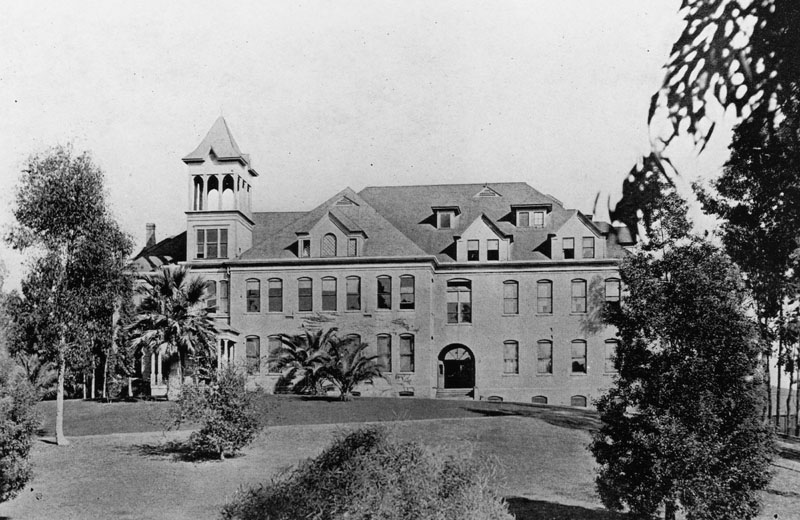
The college in 1912

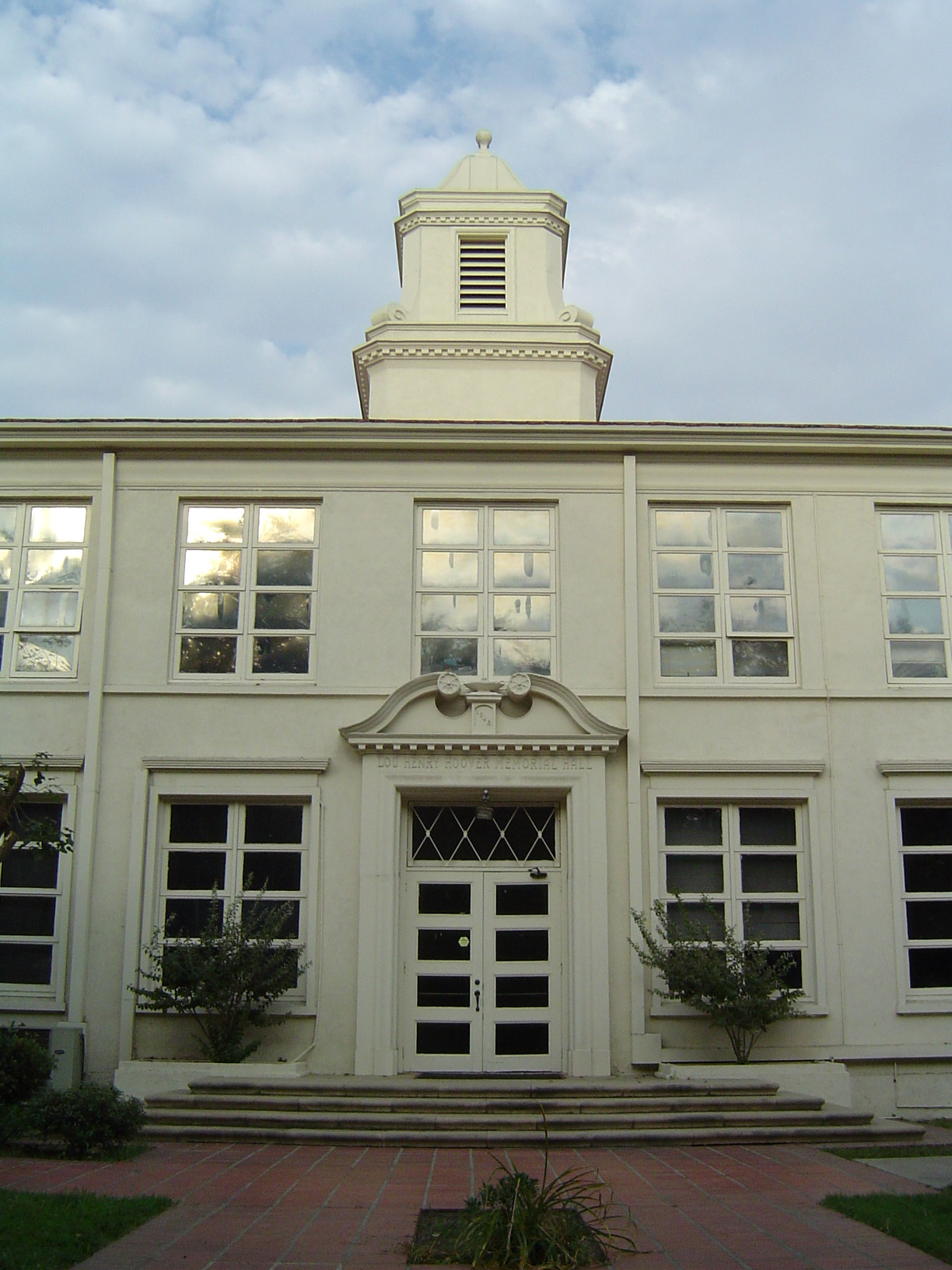
Hoover Hall

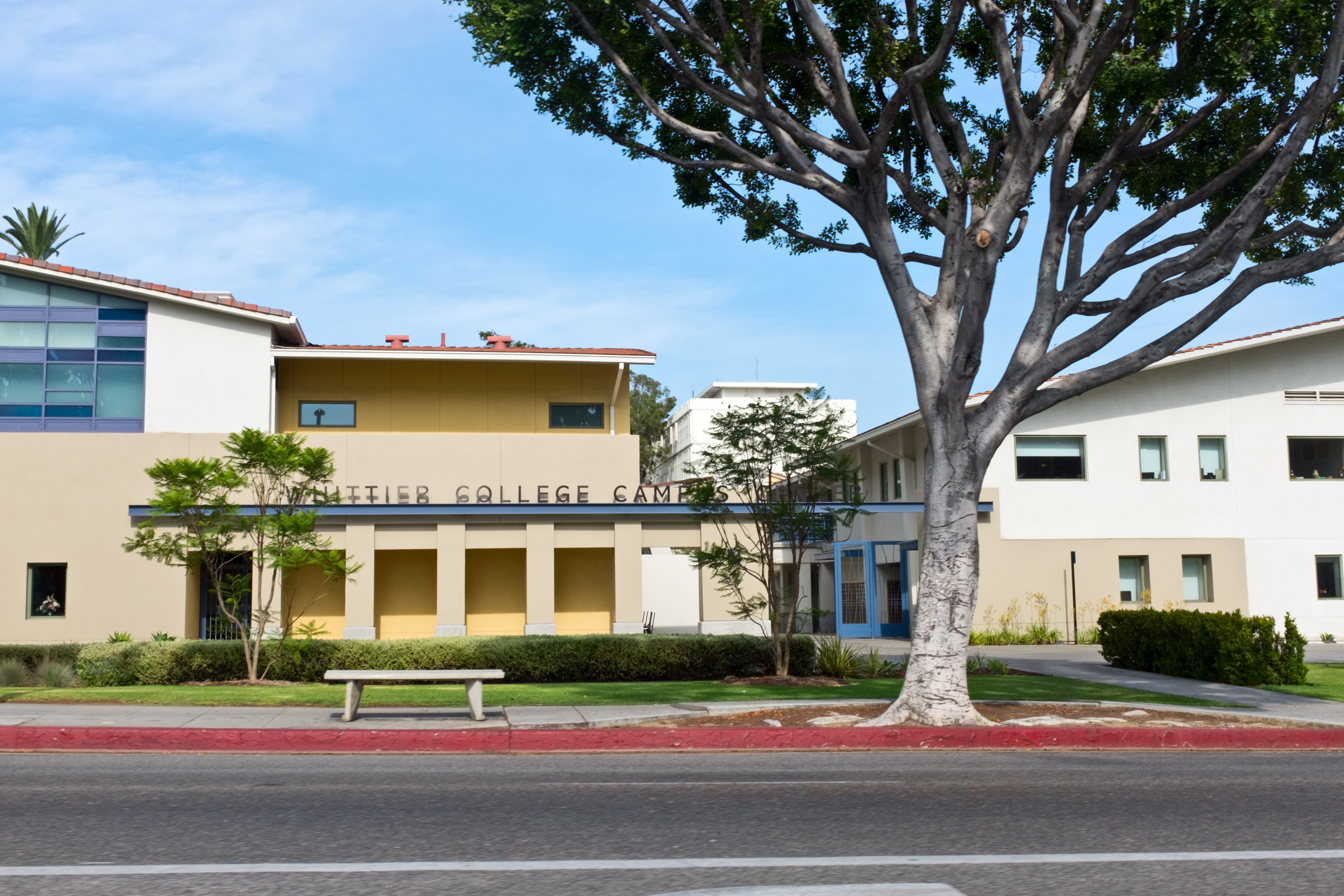
Entrance

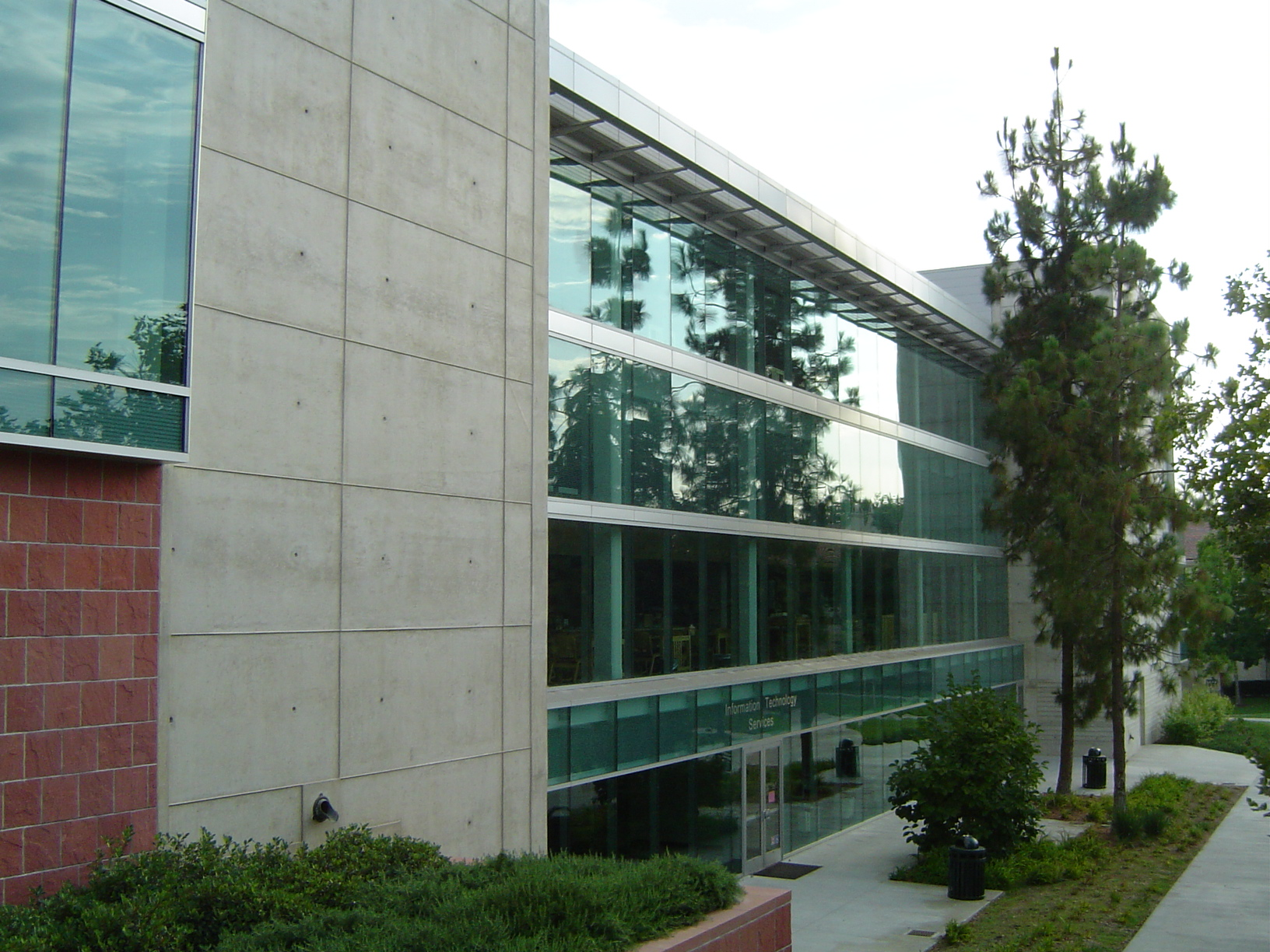
Library

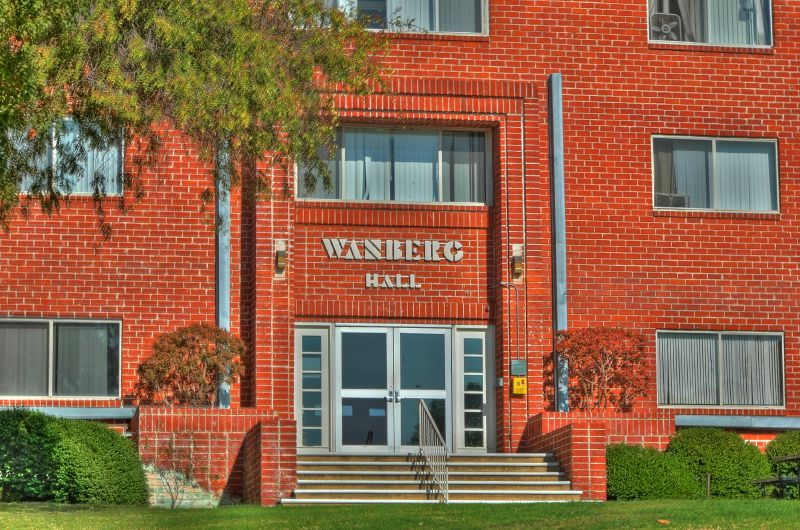
Wanberg Hall

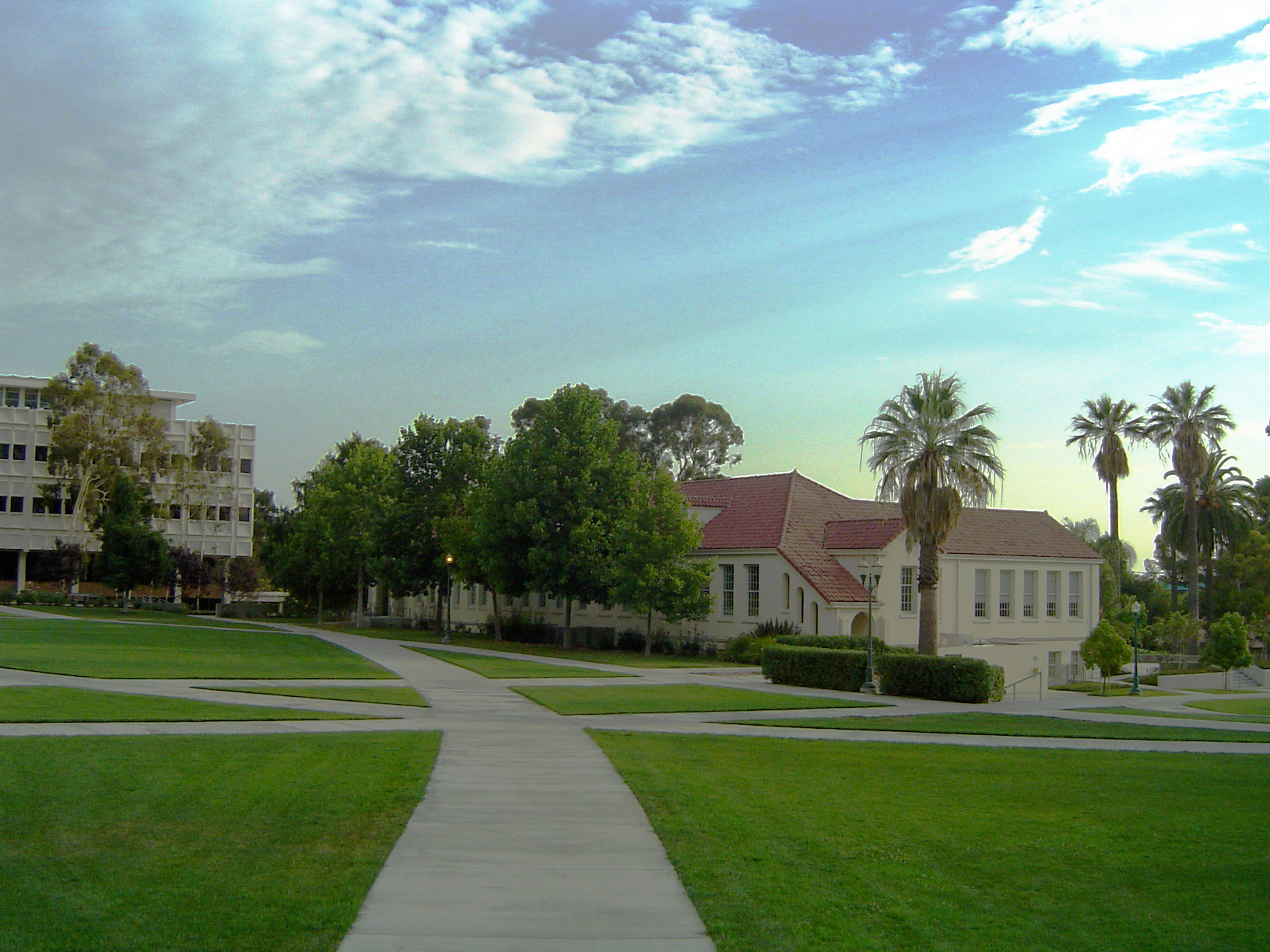
Southwest Quadrant
