= 1961 Northwest Conference football season =

- Sport: Football
- Number of teams: 6
- Champion: Linfield

Football seasons
- ← 1960 1962 →

1961 Northwest Conference football standings
	Conf.					Overall
Team	W		L		T	W		L		T
No. 3 Linfield $^	5	–	0	–	0	10	–	1	–	0
Lewis & Clark	3	–	2	–	0	6	–	3	–	0
College of Idaho	3	–	2	–	0	5	–	4	–	0
Willamette	3	–	2	–	0	4	–	4	–	0
Whitman	1	–	4	–	0	1	–	7	–	0
Pacific (OR)	0	–	5	–	0	0	–	9	–	0
$ – Conference champion; ^ – NAIA playoff participant; Rankings from NAIA poll

The 1961 Northwest Conference football season was the season of college football played by the six member schools of the Northwest Conference (NWC) as part of the 1961 college football season. The 1961 Linfield Wildcats football team won the conference championship with an undefeated 9–0 record in the regular season. They advanced to the NAIA playoffs where they defeated Whittier in the semifinals and lost to Pittsburg State in the Camellia Bowl, the NAIA national championship game.

== Teams ==
=== Linfield ===
1961 Linfield Wildcats football

NWC champion

Camellia Bowl, L 7–12 vs. Pittsburg State
- Conference: Northwest Conference
- Record: 10–1 (5–0 NWC)
- Head coach: Paul Durham (14th season)
- Home stadium: Maxwell Field

The 1961 Linfield Wildcats football team represented the Linfield University of McMinnville, Oregon. In their 14th year under head coach Paul Durham, the team compiled a 10–1 record (5–0 against NWC opponents) and won the Northwest Conference championship. The Wildcats advanced to the NAIA playoffs, defeated Whittier in the semifinals and lost to Pittsburg State in the Camellia Bowl, the NAIA national championship game.

Back Steve Beguin received third-team honors on the 1961 Little All-America college football team.

Date	Opponent	Rank	Site	Result	Attendance	Source
September 23	at Southern Oregon*		Ashland, OR	W 34–25		
September 30	Oregon College of Education*		Maxwell Field; McMinnville, OR	W 13–7		
October 7	at Lewis & Clark		Portland, OR	W 33–9		
October 14	Chico State*		Maxwell Field; McMinnville, OR	W 34–7	1,200	
October 21	Whitman^{†}		Maxwell Field; McMinnville, OR	W 52–0		
October 28	at College of Idaho		Caldwell, ID	W 44–7		
November 4	at Pacific (OR)		Forest Grove, OR	W 46–0		
November 11	Portland State*		Maxwell Field; McMinnville, OR	W 55–19		
November 18	Willamette		Maxwell Field; McMinnville, OR	W 34–12		
November 25	Whittier*		Maxwell Field; McMinnville, OR (NAIA semifinals)	W 18–7		
December 9	vs. No. 1 Pittsburg State*	No. 7	Sacramento, CA (NAIA Championship Game—Camellia Bowl)	L 7–12	10,000	
*Non-conference game; ^{†}Homecoming; Rankings from AP Poll released prior to the game

=== Lewis & Clark ===
1961 Lewis & Clark Pioneers football
- Conference: Northwest Conference
- Record: 8–3 (3–2 NWC)
- Head coach: Joe Huston (15th season)

The 1961 Lewis & Clark Pioneers football team represented Lewis & Clark College of Portland, Oregon. In their 15th year under head coach Joe Huston, the Pioneers compiled a 6–3 record (3–2 in conference games) and finished in a tie for second place in the conference.

Date	Opponent	Site	Result	Attendance	Source
September 23	Portland State*	Roosevelt HS field; Portland, OR	W 39–6	2,300	
September 30	at Southern Oregon*	Fuller Field; Ashland, OR	W 28–26		
October 7	Linfield	Portland, OR	L 9–33		
October 14	at Whitman	Walla Walla, WA	W 27–13		
October 21	College of Idaho	Portland, OR	W 46–0		
October 28	Willamette	McCulloch Stadium	L 7–14		
November 4	at San Diego Marine Recruit Depot	San Diego, CA	L 20–22		
November 11	at Oregon College of Education*	Monmouth, OR	W 28–13		
November 18	Pacific (OR)	Portland, OR	W 36–7		
*Non-conference game

=== College of Idaho ===
1961 College of Idaho Coyotes football
- Conference: Northwest Conference
- Record: 5–4 (3–2 NWC)
- Head coach: James A. Brown (4th season)

The 1961 College of Idaho Coyotes football team represented the College of Idaho of Caldwell, Idaho. In their fourth year under head coach James A. Brown, the team compiled a 5–4 record (3–2 against NWC opponents) and tied for second place in the Northwest Conference.

Date	Opponent	Site	Result	Attendance	Source
September 23	at Eastern Oregon*	La Grande, OR	W 14–0		
September 30	Westminster (UT)*	Caldwell, ID	L 7–13	250	
October 7	at Pacific (OR)	Forest Grove, OR	W 32–0		
October 14	Willamette	Caldwell, ID	W 34–24		
October 21	at Lewis & Clark	Portland, OR	L 0–46		
October 28	Linfield	Caldwell, ID	L 7–44		
November 4	Whitman	Caldwell, ID	W 67–0		
November 11	at Oregon Tech*	Modoc Field; Klamath Falls, OR	L 6–12		
November 18	Eastern Washington*		W 23–6		
*Non-conference game

=== Willamette ===
1961 Willamette Bearcats football
- Conference: Northwest Conference
- Record: 4–4 (3–2 NWC)
- Head coach: Ted Ogdahl (10th season)

The 1961 Willamette Bearcats football team epresented the Willamette University of Salem, Oregon. In their tenth season under head coach Ted Ogdahl, the team compiled a 4–4 record (3–2 against NWC opponents) and finished in fourth place in the conference.

Date	Opponent	Site	Result	Attendance	Source
September 23	at Puget Sound*	Tacoma, WA	L 19–20		
September 30	Humboldt State	McCulloch Stadium; Salem, OR	L 13–27	4,500	
October 14	at College of Idaho	Caldwell, ID	L 24–34		
October 21	Pacific (OR)		W 31–14		
October 28	Lewis & Clark	McCulloch Stadium; Salem, OR	W 14–7		
November 4	at British Columbia	Vancouver, BC	W 47–20		
November 11	Whitman	McCulloch Stadium; Salem, OR	W 53–7		
November 18	at Linfield	Maxwell Field; McMinnville, OR	L 12–34		
*Non-conference game

=== Whitman ===
1961 Whitman Fighting Missionaries football
- Conference: Northwest Conference
- Record: 1–7 (1–4 NWC)
- Head coach: Robert Thomsen (7th season)

The 1961 Whitman Fighting Missionaries football team represented Whitman College of Walla Walla, Washington. In their seventh season under head coach Robert Thomsen, the team compiled a 1–7 record (1–4 against NWC opponents) and finished in fifth place in the Northwest Conference.

Date	Opponent	Site	Result	Attendance	Source
September 23	at Central Washington*	Ellensburg, WA	L 0–19		
September 30	Eastern Oregon*	Walla Walla, WA	L 13–19		
October 7	at British Columbia	Vancouver, BC	L 0–16		
October 14	Lewis & Clark	Walla Walla, WA	L 13–27		
October 21	at Linfield	Maxwell Field; McMinnville, OR	L 0–52		
October 28	Pacific (OR)	Walla Walla, WA	W 19–13		
November 4	at College of Idaho	Caldwell, ID	L 0–67		
November 11	at Willamette	McCulloch Stadium; Salem, OR	L 7–53		
*Non-conference game

=== Pacific (OR) ===
1961 Pacific Badgers football
- Conference: Northwest Conference
- Record: 0–9 (0–5 NWC)
- Head coach: Noah G. Allen (1st season)
- Home stadium: McCready Stadium

The 1961 Pacific Badgers football team represented Pacific University of Forest Grove, Oregon. In their first season under head coach Noah G. Allen, the team compiled a 0–9 record (0–5 against NWC opponents) and finished in last place in the Northwest Conference.

Date	Opponent	Site	Result	Attendance	Source
September 23	Pacific Lutheran*	Forest Grove, OR	L 9–12		
September 30	at Chico State*	College Field; Chico, CA	L 17–20	3,700	
October 7	College of Idaho	Forest Grove, ID	L 0–32		
October 14	Oregon College of Education^{†}*	McCready Stadium; Forest Grove, OR	L 14–27		
October 21	Willamette		L 14–31		
October 28	at Whitman	Walla Walla, WA	L 13–19		
November 4	Linfield	Forest Grove, OR	L 0–46		
November 11	vs. Southern Oregon*	McCready Stadium; Forest Grove, OR	L 0–33		
November 18	at Lewis & Clark	Portland, OR	L 7–36		
*Non-conference game; ^{†}Homecoming
