= Jesse Williams (Canadian football) =

American gridiron football player (1940–2015)

Profile
- Position: Linebacker

Personal information
- Born: November 17, 1940; Corcoran, California, U.S.
- Died: September 17, 2015 (aged 74); Tulare, California, U.S.
- Listed height: 6 ft 4 in (1.93 m)
- Listed weight: 243 lb (110 kg)

Career information
- College: Fresno State
- AFL draft: 1962: 21st round, 168th overall pick

Career history
- 1964–1965: BC Lions

Awards and highlights
- Grey Cup champion (1964)

Jesse Ross "J. R." Williams (November 17, 1940 – September 17, 2015) was an American professional football player who played for the BC Lions. He won the Grey Cup with them in 1964. He played college football at Fresno State University and Bakersfield College. Williams was inducted into the Bob Elias Kern County Sports Hall of Fame in 2001. After his football career he was a football coach, coaching at Arvin High School and Highland High School in Bakersfield. He died in 2015.
