= 1961 Arizona Wildcats football team =

American college football season

1961 Arizona Wildcats football
- Conference: Independent

Ranking
- AP: No. 17
- Record: 8–1–1
- Head coach: Jim LaRue (3rd season)
- MVP: Eddie Wilson
- Captains: Bob Garis; Eddie Wilson
- Home stadium: Arizona Stadium

1961 Western college football independents records
	Conf.			Overall
Team	W	L	T	W		L		T
No. 17 Arizona		–		8	–	1	–	1
Westminster (UT)		–		7	–	1	–	1
La Verne		–		7	–	2	–	0
Idaho State		–		5	–	2	–	1
San Francisco		–		4	–	2	–	0
Cal Poly Pomona		–		6	–	3	–	0
San Jose State		–		6	–	4	–	0
Eastern New Mexico		–		6	–	4	–	0
Los Angeles Pacific		–		5	–	3	–	0
Montana State		–		4	–	3	–	1
Pacific (CA)		–		5	–	4	–	0
Azusa		–		4	–	3	–	0
Oregon State		–		5	–	5	–	0
Santa Clara		–		3	–	3	–	0
Oregon		–		4	–	6	–	0
Claremont		–		3	–	6	–	0
Air Force		–		3	–	7	–	0
Washington State		–		3	–	7	–	0
Cal Western		–		3	–	7	–	0
Idaho		–		2	–	7	–	0
San Diego		–		2	–	8	–	0
Southern California College		–		1	–	5	–	0
UC Riverside		–		1	–	7	–	0
Pepperdine		–		1	–	9	–	0

The 1961 Arizona Wildcats football team was an American football team that represented the University of Arizona as an independent during the 1961 college football season. In their third season under head coach Jim LaRue, the Wildcats compiled an 8–1–1 record, were ranked No. 17 in the final AP Poll, and outscored their opponents by a total of 288 to 131.

The team was led on offense by quarterback Eddie Wilson and halfback Bobby Thompson. Wilson ranked third nationally in passing (1,294 yards) and fifth in total offense (1,377 yards). Thompson ranked seventh nationally in scoring (82 points) and ninth in rushing (752 yards).

Three Arizona players were among the top 38 picks in the 1962 NFL draft: Joe Hernandez 15th; Wilson 24th; and Thompson 38th.

The team played its home games in Arizona Stadium in Tucson, Arizona.

== Schedule ==
Date	Time	Opponent	Site	Result	Attendance	Source
September 23		Colorado State*	Arizona Stadium; Tucson, AZ	W 28–6	24,300	
September 30	1:00 p.m.	at Nebraska*	Memorial Stadium; Lincoln, NE	T 14–14	34,721	
October 7		Hardin–Simmons	Arizona Stadium; Tucson, AZ	W 53–7	25,179	
October 14		at Oregon*	Multnomah Stadium; Portland, OR	W 15–6	18,651	
October 21		New Mexico	Arizona Stadium; Tucson, AZ (rivalry)	W 22–21		
October 28		at West Texas State	Buffalo Bowl; Canyon, TX	L 23–27	12,000	
November 4		Wyoming*	Arizona Stadium; Tucson, AZ	W 20–15	25,150	
November 11	8:00 p.m.	Idaho*	Arizona Stadium; Tucson, AZ	W 43–7	20,350	
November 18		Texas Western	Arizona Stadium; Tucson, AZ	W 48–15	22,200	
November 25		at Arizona State	Sun Devil Stadium; Tempe, AZ (rivalry)	W 22–13	40,164	
*Non-conference game; All times are in Mountain time

== Statistics ==
The Wilcats gained an average of 232.6 rushing yards and 145.6 passing yards per game. On defense, they gave up an average of 181.0 rushing yards and 79.1 passing yards per game.

Quarterback Eddie Wilson led the team in passing, completing 79 of 154 passes (51.3% completion) for 1,294 yards, 10 touchdowns, seven interceptions and a 134.2 quarterback rating. His 1,294 passing yards was the third most in major college football in 1961, trailing only Ron Miller of Wisconsin and Chon Gallegos of San Jose State. Wilson also led the team and ranked fifth nationally with 1,377 yards of total offense.

Halfback Bobby Thompson also ranked among the national leaders in both scoring and rushing yardage. He ranked seventh nationally with 82 points scored (13 touchdowns and four extra points) and ninth nationally with 752 rushing yards on 157 carries for an average of 4.89 yards per carry. Thompson also led the team in receiving with 468 receiving yards on 25 receptions for an average of 18.7 yards per catch.

The team's rushing leaders after Thompson were Walt Mince (328 yards, 53 carries, 6.2-yard average), Joe Hernandez (278 yards, 55 carries, 5.1-yard average), Ted Christy (194 yards, 47 carries, 4.1-yard average), and Jim Faulks (168 yards, 33 carries, 5.1-yard average).

The team's leading receivers after Thompson were Joe Hernandez (423 yards, 27 receptions, 15.7-yard average) and Walt Mince (201 yards, nine receptions, 22.3-yard average).

The leading scorers after Thompson were Joe Hernandez and Walt Mince, each with 42 points, and Eddie Wilson with 24 points.

== Awards ==
Quarterback Eddie Wilson was selected by the Associated Press (AP) as the third-team quarterback on the 1961 All-America college football team. He was the first Arizona player to win All-Americ honors since Jim Donarski was named to the second team in 1961. Three other Arizona players received honorable mention from the AP: center Bob Garis, halfback Bobby Thompson, and Joe Hernandez.

Wilson also received: the Governor's Award as the team's most valuable senior player; and The Arizona Daily Star's 1961 Athlete-of-the-Year award.

Wilson and center Bob Garis were selected as the team captains.

== Pro football drafts ==
Three Arizona players were selected among the top 38 players in the 1962 NFL draft. No other college team had so many player drafted in the early rounds. The players selected in the 1962 NFL and AFL drafts were:

- Joe Hernandez—15th pick in the NFL draft (Washington Redskins), 24th pick in the NFL draft (Detroit Lions), 33rd pick in the AFL draft (Oakland Raiders)
- Eddie Wilson—24th pick in the NFL draft (Detroit Lions), 19th pick in the AFL draft (Dallas Texans)
- Bobby Thompson—38th pick in the NFL draft (Detroit Lions), 91st pick in the AFL draft (Dallas Texans)
- Walt Mince—234th pick in the AFL draft (Denver Broncos)
