= Los Angeles College Prep Academy =

Charter school in Los Angeles, California, United States

Coordinates: 34.10266°N 118.18325°W

Location
- 625 Coleman Ave; Hermon, Los Angeles County, California; United States

Information
- Opened: September 6, 2005
- Closed: June 30, 2024
- Grades: 9-12
- Website: www.lacpacademy.org

Los Angeles College Prep Academy was originally the Los Angeles International Charter High School, an award winning charter school in Hermon, Los Angeles, California, near El Sereno. It was a prominent and distinguished school in North East Los Angeles from 2005-2024. It occupied the campus of the former Pacific Christian High School.

== History ==
The school opened on September 6, 2005.

Clifford Moseley, Vaughn Bernandez, and Ben Maurer who taught and were coworkers at the California Academy for Liberal Studies established LA International in collaboration with a group of parents in the Highland Park neighborhood.

Originally the school operated under a four-year charter from the Los Angeles Unified School District (LAUSD). It began with 90 students; Mitchell Landsberg of the Los Angeles Times said that the figure is what "most charter experts would say is too few to be financially sustainable." The school’s initial site was the American Legion hall and surrounding campus in Eagle Rock/ NE Los Angeles. When the school was denied usage of that site, and at the last minute, it had to move into a site in Sherman Oaks in the San Fernando Valley for its second year. The original LAUSD charter would later be renewed for one year.

In March 2009 LAUSD stated that it would not renew the charter because of fiscal issues. Ultimately, the Office of Education re-approved the charter. In January 2010 most students at LA International wanted to attend universities and colleges. Landsberg said that in 2010 "Today, the school has a new principal, some new teachers and a new lease on life. Students and parents speak enthusiastically, saying it is safe, nurturing and academically challenging."

Mosley said that the school had received more support from the county education office than from LAUSD.

Landsberg said that "L.A. International is an example of a charter school that has struggled to get on its feet, a reflection of just how difficult it is to start a new school from scratch. It is also an example of the relatively lax oversight -- and scant support -- that charters have historically received from the Los Angeles Unified School District. Finally, its students' devotion demonstrates how even academically struggling charters can connect to pupils who don't fit in at large, traditional schools."

The school closed on June 30, 2024.

== Academic performance ==
In a three-year turnaround, for the 2012-13 school year, its Academic Performance Index was 785, 154 points higher than its 2010 figure when the Times article was written, shortly after leaving LAUSD. That 2013 API was also 72 points higher than the 713 score posted by Franklin High School and 132 points higher than the 653 posted by Wilson High School—the two closest LAUSD high schools serving the same neighborhoods and which also have predominantly Hispanic and Latino student bodies.

In May 2014, State Superintendent of Public Instruction Tom Torlakson announced that Los Angeles International Charter High was one of four high schools in California (among the 106 total public schools) to receive the 2013-14 Title I Academic Achievement Award; the only high school so recognized in the Los Angeles area. To receive this distinction, the school must demonstrate that all students are making significant progress toward proficiency on California's academic content standards. Additionally, the school's socioeconomically disadvantaged students (77 percent of L.A. International's students at the time) must have doubled the achievement targets set for them for two consecutive years. This Award is given to schools receiving federal Title I funds as authorized by the Elementary and Secondary Education Act. Title I, the single largest federal educational program for K-12 public education, assists schools in meeting the educational needs of students living at or below the poverty line. Of the approximately 10,000 schools in California, more than 6,000 of them participate in the Title I program.
