= 1961 Pepperdine Waves football team =

American college football season

1961 Pepperdine Waves football
- Conference: Independent
- Record: 1–9
- Head coach: Pence Dacus (2nd season)
- Home stadium: Sentinel Field

1961 Western college football independents records
	Conf.			Overall
Team	W	L	T	W		L		T
No. 17 Arizona		–		8	–	1	–	1
Westminster (UT)		–		7	–	1	–	1
La Verne		–		7	–	2	–	0
Idaho State		–		5	–	2	–	1
San Francisco		–		4	–	2	–	0
Cal Poly Pomona		–		6	–	3	–	0
San Jose State		–		6	–	4	–	0
Eastern New Mexico		–		6	–	4	–	0
Los Angeles Pacific		–		5	–	3	–	0
Montana State		–		4	–	3	–	1
Pacific (CA)		–		5	–	4	–	0
Azusa		–		4	–	3	–	0
Oregon State		–		5	–	5	–	0
Santa Clara		–		3	–	3	–	0
Oregon		–		4	–	6	–	0
Claremont		–		3	–	6	–	0
Air Force		–		3	–	7	–	0
Washington State		–		3	–	7	–	0
Cal Western		–		3	–	7	–	0
Idaho		–		2	–	7	–	0
San Diego		–		2	–	8	–	0
Southern California College		–		1	–	5	–	0
UC Riverside		–		1	–	7	–	0
Pepperdine		–		1	–	9	–	0

The 1961 Pepperdine Waves football team represented George Pepperdine College (Note: Pepperdine University was known as George Pepperdine College from 1937 to 1970.) as an independent during the 1961 college football season. The team was led by second-year head coach Pence Dacus. The Waves played home games at Sentinel Field on the campus of Inglewood High School in Inglewood, California. Pepperdine finished the season with a record of 1–9 for the second year in a row.

On December 20, 1961, Pepperdine announced that it was dropping its football team due to financial considerations. In its 16 years of existence, the Waves football team compiled an overall 64–79–2 record, for a .448 winning percentage.

== Schedule ==
Date	Opponent	Site	Result	Attendance	Source
September 16	at Sacramento State	Charles C. Hughes Stadium; Sacramento, CA	L 0–21		
September 23	at Chico State	College Field; Chico, CA	L 16–27	3,850	
September 30	New Mexico Highlands	Lynwood High School; Lynwood, CA	L 16–18		
October 7	Whittier	Sentinel Field; Inglewood, CA	L 11–28		
October 14	at San Diego	Balboa Stadium; San Diego, CA	L 0–13		
October 21	at Cal Poly Pomona	L.A. State Stadium; Los Angeles, CA	L 14–26	2,500	
October 28	Cal Western (Note: Alliant International University was formed in 2001 via the merger of United States International University (USIU) and California School of Professional Psychology. USIU had been known as California Western University (Cal Western) from 1952 to 1967.)	Balboa Stadium ?; San Diego, CA	W 16–9		
November 4	San Diego State	Sentinel Field; Inglewood, CA	L 6–21	9,000	
November 10	at UC Santa Barbara	La Playa Stadium; Santa Barbara, CA	L 14–19	2,000	
November 18	Long Beach State	Sentinel Field; Inglewood, CA	L 15–22	1,500	
