= 1961 Arizona State Sun Devils football team =

American college football season

1961 Arizona State Sun Devils football
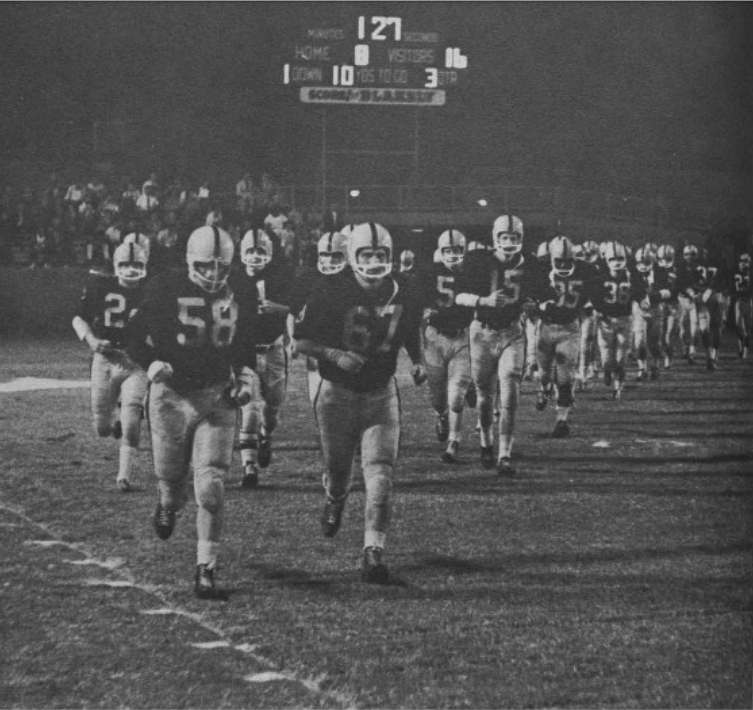
- Photograph of 1961 football team trotting onto the field (from The Sahuaro 1962)

Border champion
- Conference: Border Conference
- Record: 7–3 (3–0 Border)
- Head coach: Frank Kush (4th season)
- Home stadium: Sun Devil Stadium

1961 Border Conference football standings
	Conf.					Overall
Team	W		L		T	W		L		T
Arizona State §	3	–	0	–	0	7	–	3	–	0
West Texas State	3	–	1	–	0	6	–	4	–	0
New Mexico State	2	–	1	–	0	5	–	4	–	1
Texas Western	1	–	3	–	0	3	–	7	–	0
Hardin–Simmons	0	–	4	–	0	0	–	10	–	0
$ – Conference champion

The 1961 Arizona State Sun Devils football team was an American football team that represented Arizona State University as a member of the Border Conference during the 1961 college football season. In their fourth season under head coach Frank Kush, the Sun Devils compiled a 7–3 record (3–0 in conference games), won the Border Conference championship, and outscored opponents by a total of 287 to 163.

The team was led by senior quarterback Joe Zuger and senior halfback Nolan Jones. Zuger led the team in passing, total offense, interceptions, and punting. Jones led the team in rushing, scoring, place kicking, and punt returns, andranked second behind Zuger in total offense.

The team played its home games at Sun Devil Stadium in Tempe, Arizona.

== Schedule ==
Date	Opponent	Site	Result	Attendance	Source
September 23	Wichita*	Sun Devil Stadium; Tempe, AZ	W 21–7	29,600–30,000	
September 30	at Colorado State*	Colorado Field; Fort Collins, CO	W 14–6	8,800	
October 7	Utah*	Sun Devil Stadium; Tempe, AZ	L 26–28	31,300	
October 14	at West Texas State	Kimbrough Memorial Stadium; Canyon, TX	W 28–11	17,000	
October 21	Oregon State*	Sun Devil Stadium; Tempe, AZ	W 24–23	32,231	
October 28	Hardin–Simmons	Sun Devil Stadium; Tempe, AZ	W 47–0	21,112	
November 4	at San Jose State*	Spartan Stadium; San Jose, CA	L 26–32	19,000–20,000	
November 11	at Texas Western	Kidd Field; El Paso, TX	W 28–20	9,000	
November 18	Detroit*	Sun Devil Stadium; Tempe, AZ	W 40–6	23,508	
November 25	Arizona*	Sun Devil Stadium; Tempe, AZ (rivalry)	L 13–22	40,164	
*Non-conference game

== Statistics ==
The 1961 Sun Devils gained 3,354 yards of total offense (335.4 yards per game), consisting of 1,999 rushing yards (199.9 yards per game) and 1,355 passing yards (135.5 yards per game). On defense, they gave up 2,785 yards (278.5 yards per game), including 1,678 rushing yards and 1,107 passing yards.

Senior quarterback Joe Zuger played on offense, defense, and special teams, and led the team in passing, total offense (162 plays, 861 yards), interceptions (11), and punting (42.1-yard average). He completed 67 of 133 passes (50.4%) for 879 yards with eight touchdowns, eight interceptions, and a 113.7 quarterback rating.

Senior halfback Nolan Jones led the team in rushing (85 carries, 411 yards, 4.8-yard average), scoring (77 points), place kicking (18 of 28 on extra points and three for three on field goals), and punt returns (17 for 104 yards). Jones also ranked second behind Zuger in total offense (88 plays, 429 yards).

The Sun Devils had six players who carried the ball over 40 times and gained over 150 rushing yards. In addition to Jones, they were: John McFalls (387 yards, 66 carries, 5.9-yard average), Charley Taylor (277 yards, 57 carries, 4.9-yard average), Tony Lorick (239 yards, 44 carries, 5.4-yard average), Clay Freney (176 yards, 54 carries, 3.3-yard average), Dornel Nelson (171 yards, 44 carries, 3.9-yard average), and Ossie McCarty (160 yards, 41 carries, 3.9-yard average).

The team also had six players who tallied over 100 passing yards: Charley Taylor (13 receptions, 235 yards, 18.1-yard average); Roger Locke (14 receptions, 222 yards, 16.5-yard average); Dale Keller (11 receptions, 183 yards, 16.6-yard average); Herman Harrison (14 receptions, 175 yards, 12.5-yard average); Ossie McCarty (eight receptions, 144 yards, 18.0-yard average); and John McFalls (eight receptions, 105 yards, 13.1-yard average).

== Awards and honors ==
Seven Arizona State players received first-team honors, based on voting by the conference head coaches, on the 1961 All-Border Conference football team: Roger Locke at end; George Flint and Larry Reaves at tackle; Dick Locke at guard; Fred Rhoades at center; Nolan Jones at halfback; and Clay Freney at fullback. Roger and Dick Locke were brothers, coming to Arizona State from Muskegon, Michigan. Two others were named or the second team: Joe Zuger at quarterback and Dale Keller at end.

== Personnel ==
=== Players ===
- Jesse Bradford (#76), guard, 190 pounds
- Ron Cosner (#11), quarterback, 185 pounds
- Ken Craft (#65), guard, 200 pounds
- Steve Fedorchak (#70), center, 210 pounds
- George Flint (#64), tackle, 225 pounds
- Clay Freney (#35), fullback, 180 pounds
- Herman Harrison (#86), end, 200 pounds
- Nolan Jones (#16), halfback, 170 pounds
- Dale Keller (#88), end, 210 pounds
- Mike Krofchik (#61), tackle, 206 pounds
- Joe Kush (#69), guard, 190 pounds
- Tim Lee (#83), end, 180 pounds
- Dick Locke (#67), guard, 210 pounds
- Roger Locke (#87), end, 205 pounds
- Tony Lorick (#26), halfback, 210 pounds
- Ossie McCarty (#23), halfback, 165 pounds
- John McFalls (#25), halfback, 170 pounds
- Hase McKey (#77), tackle, 235 pounds
- Dornel Nelson (#42), fullback, 196 pounds
- Larry Reaves (#66), tackle, 220 pounds
- Fred Rhoades (#58), center, 200 pounds
- Charlie Taylor (#37), halfback, 186 pounds
- Bob Widmer (#62), guard, 185 pounds
- Joe Zuger (#15), 190 pounds

==== Gallery ====
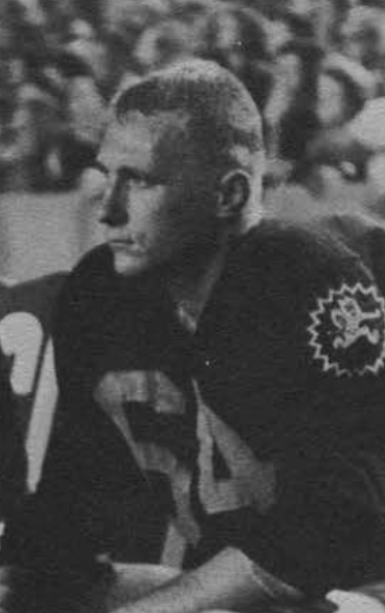
Tackle George Flint

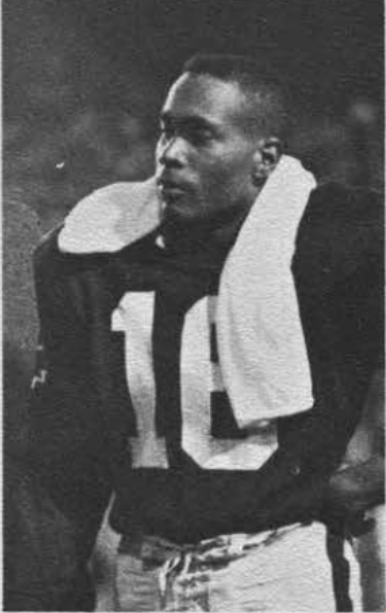
Halfback Nolan Jones

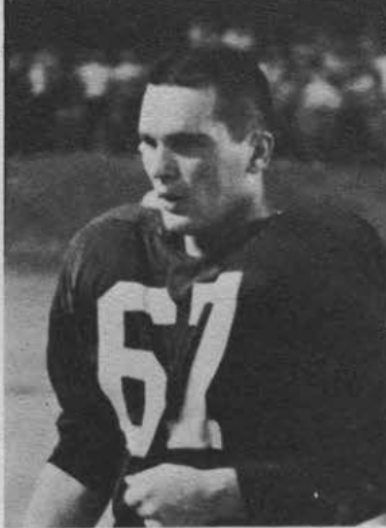
Guard Dick Locke

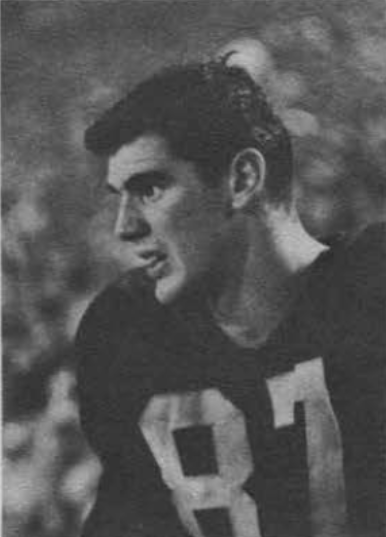
End Roger Locke

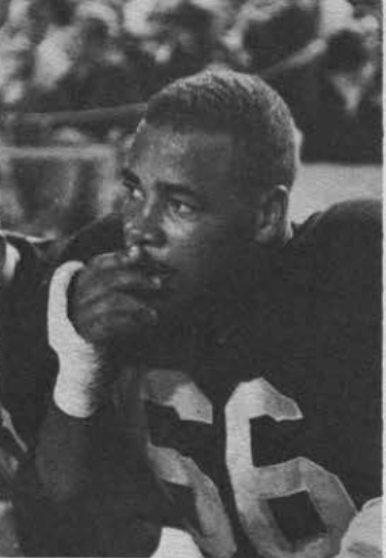
Tackle Larry Reaves

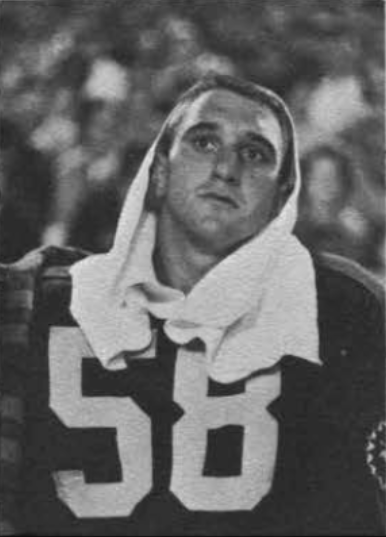
Center Fred Rhoades

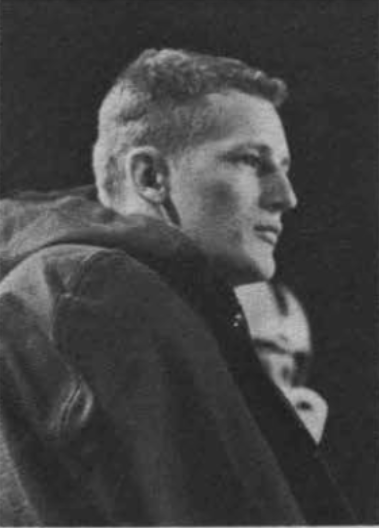
Quarterback Joe Zuger

=== Coaches ===
- Head coach: Frank Kush
- Assistant coaches: Gene Felker (end coach and scout)
