= 1961 San Jose State Spartans football team =

American college football season

1961 San Jose State Spartans football
- Conference: Independent
- Record: 6–4
- Head coach: Bob Titchenal (5th season)
- Home stadium: Spartan Stadium

1961 Western college football independents records
	Conf.			Overall
Team	W	L	T	W		L		T
No. 17 Arizona		–		8	–	1	–	1
Westminster (UT)		–		7	–	1	–	1
La Verne		–		7	–	2	–	0
Idaho State		–		5	–	2	–	1
San Francisco		–		4	–	2	–	0
Cal Poly Pomona		–		6	–	3	–	0
San Jose State		–		6	–	4	–	0
Eastern New Mexico		–		6	–	4	–	0
Los Angeles Pacific		–		5	–	3	–	0
Montana State		–		4	–	3	–	1
Pacific (CA)		–		5	–	4	–	0
Azusa		–		4	–	3	–	0
Oregon State		–		5	–	5	–	0
Santa Clara		–		3	–	3	–	0
Oregon		–		4	–	6	–	0
Claremont		–		3	–	6	–	0
Air Force		–		3	–	7	–	0
Washington State		–		3	–	7	–	0
Cal Western		–		3	–	7	–	0
Idaho		–		2	–	7	–	0
San Diego		–		2	–	8	–	0
Southern California College		–		1	–	5	–	0
UC Riverside		–		1	–	7	–	0
Pepperdine		–		1	–	9	–	0

The 1961 San Jose State Spartans football team represented San Jose State College—now known as San Jose State University—as an independent during the 1961 college football season. Led by fifth-year head coach Bob Titchenal, the Spartans compiled a record of 6–4 and were outscored by opponents 185 to 183. The team played home games at Spartan Stadium in San Jose, California.

San Jose State quarterback Chon Gallegos led the country in passing with 117 completions and 14 touchdown passes. He ranked second with 1,487 passing yards.

== Schedule ==
Date	Opponent	Site	Result	Attendance	Source
September 16	at BYU	Cougar Stadium (Note: This stadium is the predecessor to the current Cougar Stadium on the BYU campus, which was opened for the 1964 season); Provo, UT	W 14–13	9,289	
September 22	Pacific (CA)	Spartan Stadium; San Jose, CA (Victory Bell)	W 16–0	17,000	
September 30	at Idaho	Neale Stadium; Moscow, ID	L 18–27	5,000	
October 7	Colorado State	Spartan Stadium; San Jose, CA	W 14–0	15,000	
October 14	at Stanford	Stanford Stadium; Stanford, CA (rivalry)	L 6–17	45,000	
October 21	at Oregon	Hayward Field; Eugene, OR	L 6–21	10,200	
October 28	at Washington State	Memorial Stadium; Spokane, WA	W 21–19	7,700	
November 4	Arizona State	Spartan Stadium; San Jose, CA	W 32–26	19,000–20,000	
November 11	at Pacific (CA)	Pacific Memorial Stadium; Stockton, CA	W 29–26		
November 18	at Fresno State	Ratcliffe Stadium; Fresno, CA (rivalry)	L 27–36	14,141	

== Team players in the NFL/AFL ==
The following San Jose State players were selected in the 1962 NFL draft.

Player	Position	Round	Overall	NFL team
Jim Cadile	Guard – Tackle	4	49	Chicago Bears
Mac Burton	End	5	57	Chicago Bears
John Sutro	Tackle	6	79	Green Bay Packers
Oscar Donahue	Wide receiver	6	84	Green Bay Packers

The following San Jose State players were selected in the 1962 American Football League draft.

Player	Position	Round	Overall	NFL team
Oscar Donahue	Wide receiver	12	94	Oakland Raiders
John Sutro	Tackle	20	161	Oakland Raiders
Jim Cadile	Guard – Tackle	22	169	Oakland Raiders
Leon Donohue	Guard – Tackle	29	225	Oakland Raiders

The following finished their San Jose State career in 1961, were not drafted, but played in the AFL.

Player	Position	First NFL team
Chon Gallegos	Quarterback	1962 Oakland Raiders
