= 1961 Air Force Falcons football team =

American college football season

1961 Air Force Falcons football
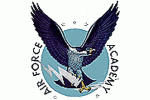
- Conference: Independent
- Record: 3–7
- Head coach: Ben Martin (4th season)
- Captain: Bob McDonough
- Home stadium: DU Stadium

1961 Western college football independents records
	Conf.			Overall
Team	W	L	T	W		L		T
No. 17 Arizona		–		8	–	1	–	1
Westminster (UT)		–		7	–	1	–	1
La Verne		–		7	–	2	–	0
Idaho State		–		5	–	2	–	1
San Francisco		–		4	–	2	–	0
Cal Poly Pomona		–		6	–	3	–	0
San Jose State		–		6	–	4	–	0
Eastern New Mexico		–		6	–	4	–	0
Los Angeles Pacific		–		5	–	3	–	0
Montana State		–		4	–	3	–	1
Pacific (CA)		–		5	–	4	–	0
Azusa		–		4	–	3	–	0
Oregon State		–		5	–	5	–	0
Santa Clara		–		3	–	3	–	0
Oregon		–		4	–	6	–	0
Claremont		–		3	–	6	–	0
Air Force		–		3	–	7	–	0
Washington State		–		3	–	7	–	0
Cal Western		–		3	–	7	–	0
Idaho		–		2	–	7	–	0
San Diego		–		2	–	8	–	0
Southern California College		–		1	–	5	–	0
UC Riverside		–		1	–	7	–	0
Pepperdine		–		1	–	9	–	0

The 1961 Air Force Falcons football team represented the United States Air Force Academy as an independent during the 1961 college football season. Led by fourth-year head coach Ben Martin, the Falcons played their home games at DU Stadium in Denver, Colorado. They were outscored by their opponents 173–87 and finished with a record of 3–7.

Both Army and Navy were off of Air Force's schedule this season and the next, when the new Falcon Stadium opened.

== Schedule ==
Date	Opponent	Site	Result	Attendance	Source
September 23	UCLA	DU Stadium; Denver, CO	L 6–19	27,500	
September 30	Kansas State	DU Stadium; Denver, CO	L 12–14	18,666	
October 7	at SMU	Cotton Bowl; Dallas, TX	L 7–9	28,000	
October 14	at Cincinnati	Nippert Stadium; Cincinnati, OH	W 8–6	15,000	
October 21	Maryland	DU Stadium; Denver, CO	L 0–21	21,500	
October 28	at New Mexico	University Stadium; Albuquerque, NM	L 6–21	17,130	
November 4	Colorado State	DU Stadium; Denver, CO (rivalry)	W 14–9	14,000–14,100	
November 11	at California	California Memorial Stadium; Berkeley, CA	W 15–14	38,000	
November 18	at Baylor	Baylor Stadium; Waco, TX	L 7–31	22,000	
December 2	at No. 7 Colorado	Folsom Field; Boulder, CO	L 12–29	23,287	
Rankings from AP Poll released prior to the game

== Roster ==
1961 Air Force Falcons football team roster
Players
Coaches
Offense

Pos.	#	Name	Class
QB		Terry Isaacson	So
OL		Joe Rodwell	So

Defense

Pos.	#	Name	Class

Special teams

Pos.	#	Name	Class

Head coach

- Ben Martin

Coordinators/assistant coaches

Legend

- (C) Team captain
- (S) Suspended
- (I) Ineligible
- Injured
- Redshirt
