= 1961 Montana State Bobcats football team =

American college football season

1961 Montana State Bobcats football
- Conference: Independent
- Record: 4–3–1
- Head coach: Herb Agocs (4th season)
- Home stadium: Gatton Field

1961 Western college football independents records
	Conf.			Overall
Team	W	L	T	W		L		T
No. 17 Arizona		–		8	–	1	–	1
Westminster (UT)		–		7	–	1	–	1
La Verne		–		7	–	2	–	0
Idaho State		–		5	–	2	–	1
San Francisco		–		4	–	2	–	0
Cal Poly Pomona		–		6	–	3	–	0
San Jose State		–		6	–	4	–	0
Eastern New Mexico		–		6	–	4	–	0
Los Angeles Pacific		–		5	–	3	–	0
Montana State		–		4	–	3	–	1
Pacific (CA)		–		5	–	4	–	0
Azusa		–		4	–	3	–	0
Oregon State		–		5	–	5	–	0
Santa Clara		–		3	–	3	–	0
Oregon		–		4	–	6	–	0
Claremont		–		3	–	6	–	0
Air Force		–		3	–	7	–	0
Washington State		–		3	–	7	–	0
Cal Western		–		3	–	7	–	0
Idaho		–		2	–	7	–	0
San Diego		–		2	–	8	–	0
Southern California College		–		1	–	5	–	0
UC Riverside		–		1	–	7	–	0
Pepperdine		–		1	–	9	–	0

The 1961 Montana State Bobcats football team was an American football team that represented Montana State College (now known as Montana State University) as an independent during the 1961 college football season. In its fourth season under head coach Herb Agocs, the team compiled a 4–3–1 record. Future Wyoming and Purdue Head Coach Joe Tiller was a sophomore on the Offensive Line.

== Schedule ==
Date	Opponent	Site	Result	Attendance	Source
September 16	at North Dakota	Memorial Stadium; Grand Forks, ND	L 0–46	5,500–5,778	
September 23	vs. Fresno State	Memorial Stadium; Great Falls, MT	L 13–16	6,000–6,800	
September 30	South Dakota State	Gatton Field; Bozeman, MT	W 17–12	4,500	
October 7	at Arkansas State	Kays Stadium; Jonesboro, AR	W 9–6		
October 14	at North Dakota State	Dacotah Field; Fargo, ND	W 35–0	5,000	
October 21	Augustana (SD)^{†}	Gatton Field; Bozeman, MT	T 6–6	2,500	
October 28	at Idaho State	Spud Bowl; Pocatello, ID	L 12–14	2,000	
November 11	Montana	Gatton Field; Bozeman, MT (rivalry)	W 10–9	8,600	
^{†}Homecoming
