= 1961 Idaho Vandals football team =

American college football season

1961 Idaho Vandals football
- Conference: Independent
- Record: 2–7
- Head coach: Skip Stahley (8th season)
- Home stadium: Neale Stadium

1961 Western college football independents records
	Conf.			Overall
Team	W	L	T	W		L		T
No. 17 Arizona		–		8	–	1	–	1
Westminster (UT)		–		7	–	1	–	1
La Verne		–		7	–	2	–	0
Idaho State		–		5	–	2	–	1
San Francisco		–		4	–	2	–	0
Cal Poly Pomona		–		6	–	3	–	0
San Jose State		–		6	–	4	–	0
Eastern New Mexico		–		6	–	4	–	0
Los Angeles Pacific		–		5	–	3	–	0
Montana State		–		4	–	3	–	1
Pacific (CA)		–		5	–	4	–	0
Azusa		–		4	–	3	–	0
Oregon State		–		5	–	5	–	0
Santa Clara		–		3	–	3	–	0
Oregon		–		4	–	6	–	0
Claremont		–		3	–	6	–	0
Air Force		–		3	–	7	–	0
Washington State		–		3	–	7	–	0
Cal Western		–		3	–	7	–	0
Idaho		–		2	–	7	–	0
San Diego		–		2	–	8	–	0
Southern California College		–		1	–	5	–	0
UC Riverside		–		1	–	7	–	0
Pepperdine		–		1	–	9	–	0

The 1961 Idaho Vandals football team represented the University of Idaho in the 1961 college football season. Led by eighth-year head coach Skip Stahley, the Vandals were an independent in the NCAA's University Division and went 2–7. Two home games were played on campus at Neale Stadium in Moscow, with one in Boise at old Bronco Stadium at Boise Junior College.

The Vandals suffered a seventh straight loss in the Battle of the Palouse with neighbor Washington State, blanked 0–34 in Pullman in mid-October. In the rivalry game with Montana, the Vandals regained the Little Brown Stein with a 16–14 win in the season finale at Boise.

In Idaho's seven losses, they were outscored 319 to 22, with three shutouts; the worst was a 69–0 rout by Utah State in a blizzard at Logan. Since the disbanding of the Pacific Coast Conference in the spring of 1959, Idaho's football teams had a 4–25 (.138) record in three seasons as an independent.

Stahley had taken on the dual role of athletic director in July 1960, and stepped down as head football coach in January 1962. He was succeeded by Dee Andros, hired in February, previously the line coach at Illinois in the Big Ten Conference. Stahley continued as Idaho's AD until mid-1964, when he departed for a similar position at Portland State College.

== Schedule ==
Date	Time	Opponent	Site	Result	Attendance	Source
September 23	1:30 pm	at Oregon	Hayward Field; Eugene, OR	L 0–51	17,800	
September 30	2:00 pm	San Jose State^{†}	Neale Stadium; Moscow, ID	W 27–18	5,000	
October 7	1:30 pm	at Oregon State	Parker Stadium; Corvallis, OR	L 6–44	9,239	
October 14	1:30 pm	at Washington State	Rogers Field; Pullman, WA (Battle of the Palouse)	L 0–34	19,432	
October 21	10:00 am	at Army	Michie Stadium; West Point, NY	L 7–51	18,275	
October 28	12:30 pm	at Utah State	old Romney Stadium; Logan, UT	L 0–69	2,000	
November 4	1:30 pm	Pacific (CA)	Neale Stadium; Moscow, ID	L 2–27	5,800	
November 11	7:00 pm	at Arizona	Arizona Stadium; Tucson, AZ	L 7–43	20,350	
November 18	1:00 pm	vs. Montana	old Bronco Stadium; Boise, Idaho (Little Brown Stein)	W 16–14	6,000	
^{†}Homecoming; All times are in Pacific time

== Coaching staff ==
- Sid Hall, line
- Gary Farnworth, backs
- Bill Peterson, ends
- George Goodell, freshmen

== All-Coast ==
Tight end Reggie Carolan was Idaho's only All-Coast selection, on the second team.

== NFL draft ==
One fifth-year senior from the 1961 Vandals was previously selected in the 1961 NFL draft:

Player	Position	Round	Pick	Franchise
Reggie Carolan	TE	8th	102	Los Angeles Rams
