= List of BYU Cougars head football coaches =

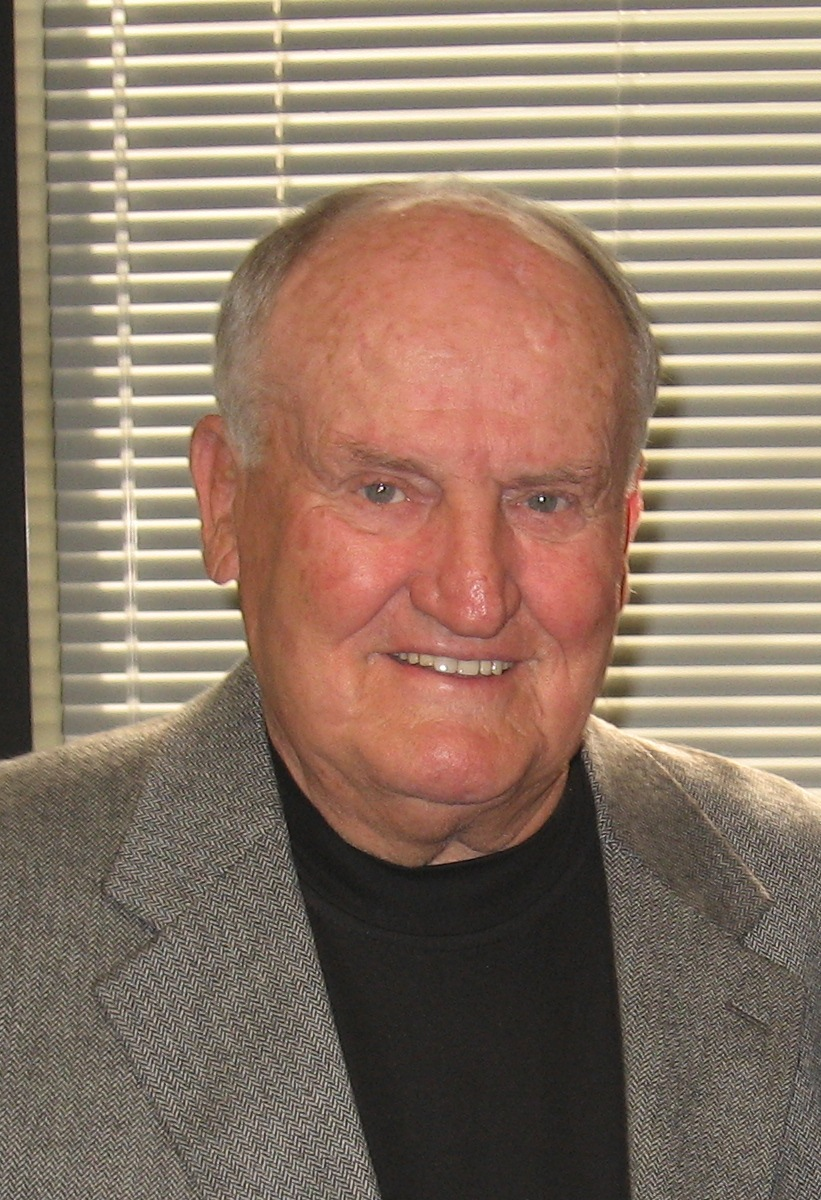
LaVell Edwards served as head coach of the BYU Cougars from 1972 to 2000 and is the winningest coach in program history.

The BYU Cougars college football team represents Brigham Young University (BYU) in the Big 12 Conference (Big 12). The Cougars competes as part of the NCAA Division I Football Bowl Subdivision. The program has had 14 head coaches since it began play during the 1922 season. Since December 2015, Kalani Sitake has served as head coach at BYU.

Five coaches have led BYU in postseason bowl games: Tommy Hudspeth, LaVell Edwards, Gary Crowton, Bronco Mendenhall, and Kalani Sitake. Four of those coaches also won conference championships: Hudspeth captured one and Edwards 18 as a member of the Western Athletic Conference; and Edwards and Crowton captured one and Mendenhall two as a member of the Mountain West Conference.

Edwards is the leader in seasons coached, games won, and winning percentage, with 257 victories (0.716 winning percentage) during his 29 years with the program. Hal Mitchell has the lowest winning percentage of those who have coached more than one game, with 0.267. Of the 14 different head coaches who have led the Cougars, Edwards has been inducted into the College Football Hall of Fame.

== Key ==
Key to symbols in coaches list
General		Overall		Conference		Postseason (Note: Although the first Rose Bowl Game was played in 1902, it has been continuously played since the 1916 game, and is recognized as the oldest bowl game by the NCAA. "—" indicates any season prior to 1916 when postseason games were not played.)	
No.	Order of coaches (Note: A running total of the number of head coaches, with coaches who served separate tenures being counted only once. Interim head coaches are represented with "Int" and are not counted in the running total. "—" indicates the team played but either without a coach or no coach is on record. "X" indicates an interim year without play.)	GC	Games coached	CW	Conference wins	PW	Postseason wins
DC	Division championships	OW	Overall wins	CL	Conference losses	PL	Postseason losses
CC	Conference championships	OL	Overall losses	CT	Conference ties	PT	Postseason ties
NC	National championships	OT	Overall ties (Note: Overtime rules in college football were introduced in 1996, making ties impossible in the period since.)	C%	Conference winning percentage		
†	Elected to the College Football Hall of Fame	O%	Overall winning percentage (Note: When computing the win–loss percentage, a tie counts as half a win and half a loss.)				

== Coaches ==
List of head football coaches showing season(s) coached, overall records, conference records, postseason records, championships and selected awards (Note: Statistics correct as of the end of the 2025 NCAA Division I FBS football season.)
No.	Name	Season(s) (Note: BYU did not field teams from 1943–1945 due to World War II.)	GC	OW	OL	OT	O%	CW	CL	CT	C%	PW	PL	PT	CC	NC
1	Alvin Twitchell	1922–1924	19	5	13	1	0.289	3	13	1	0.206	0	0	0	0	0
2	Charles J. Hart	1925–1927	20	6	12	2	0.350	6	11	1	0.361	0	0	0	0	0
3	G. Ott Romney	1928–1936	81	44	31	6	0.580	31	26	2	0.542	0	0	0	0	0
4 & 6	Eddie Kimball	1937–1941; 1946–1948	74	34	32	8	0.514	20	20	7	0.500	0	0	0	0	0
5	Floyd Millet	1942	7	2	5	0	0.286	1	4	0	0.200	0	0	0	0	0
7	Chick Atkinson	1949–1955	70	18	49	3	0.279	8	33	3	0.216	0	0	0	0	0
8	Hal Kopp	1956–1958	30	13	14	3	0.483	11	8	2	0.571	0	0	0	0	0
9	Tally Stevens	1959–1960	21	6	15	0	0.286	4	10	0	0.286	0	0	0	0	0
10	Hal Mitchell	1961–1963	30	8	22	0	0.267	4	10	0	0.286	0	0	0	0	0
11	Tommy Hudspeth	1964–1971	82	39	42	1	0.482	19	27	0	0.413	0	0	0	1	0
12	LaVell Edwards^{†}	1972–2000	361	257	101	3	0.716	175	42	2	0.804	7	14	1	19	1
13	Gary Crowton	2001–2004	49	26	23	—	0.531	16	12	—	0.571	0	1	—	1	0
14	Bronco Mendenhall	2005–2015	142	99	43	—	0.697	39	9	—	0.813	6	5	—	2	0
15	Kalani Sitake	2016–present	129	84	45	—	0.651	17	10	—	0.630	6	2	—	0	0

== Awards ==
LaVell Edwards was awarded the Bobby Dodd Coach of the Year Award (1979), the AFCA Coach of the Year (1984), the Eddie Robinson Coach of the Year (1984), and the Amos Alonzo Stagg Award (2003).
