= 1961 Wyoming Cowboys football team =

American college football season

1961 Wyoming Cowboys football

Skyline co-champion
- Conference: Skyline Conference

Ranking
- Coaches: No. 17
- Record: 6–1–2 (5–0–1 Skyline)
- Head coach: Bob Devaney (5th season)
- Captains: Bob Bisacre; Chuck Lamson
- Home stadium: War Memorial Stadium

1961 Skyline Conference football standings
	Conf.					Overall
Team	W		L		T	W		L		T
No. 10 Utah State +	5	–	0	–	1	9	–	1	–	1
Wyoming +	5	–	0	–	1	6	–	1	–	2
New Mexico	3	–	3	–	0	7	–	4	–	0
Utah	3	–	3	–	0	6	–	4	–	0
Montana	2	–	4	–	0	2	–	6	–	0
BYU	2	–	4	–	0	2	–	8	–	0
Colorado State	0	–	6	–	0	0	–	10	–	0
+ – Conference co-champions; Rankings from AP Poll

The 1961 Wyoming Cowboys football team was an American football team that represented the University of Wyoming as a member of the Skyline Conference during the 1961 college football season. In their fifth and final season under head coach Bob Devaney, the Cowboys compiled a 6–1–2 record (5–0–1 in conference game), tied for the conference championship, and outscored opponents by a total of 171 to 74. The Cowboys were ranked No. 17 in the final UPI coaches poll.

Wyoming ranked sixth nationally in rushing offense (245.0 yards per game) and fifth in total defense (167.9 yards per game). Senior quarterback and co-captain Chuck Lamson led the team in total offense (623 yards), rushing (451 yards), and scoring (32 points).

In February 1962, Devaney resigned as head coach at Wyoming to become head coach at Nebraska, and defensive line coach Lloyd Eaton was promoted as the new Wyoming head coach.

The team played its home games on campus at War Memorial Stadium in Laramie, Wyoming.

== Schedule ==
Date	Opponent	Site	Result	Attendance	Source
September 16	vs. Montana	Daylis Stadium; Billings, MT	W 29–0	8,100	
September 23	NC State*	War Memorial Stadium; Laramie, WY	W 15–14	17,301	
September 30	at Kansas*	Memorial Stadium; Lawrence, KS	T 6–6	33,000	
October 7	Utah State	War Memorial Stadium; Laramie, WY (rivalry)	T 6–6	18,090	
October 14	Colorado State	War Memorial Stadium; Laramie, WY (rivalry)	W 18–7	11,808	
October 21	BYU^{†}	War Memorial Stadium; Laramie, WY	W 36–8	15,381	
October 28	at Utah	Ute Stadium; Salt Lake City, UT	W 13–6	19,151	
November 4	at Arizona*	Arizona Stadium; Tucson, AZ	L 15–20	25,150	
November 11	at New Mexico	University Stadium; Albuquerque, NM	W 33–7	20,113	
*Non-conference game; ^{†}Homecoming

== Statistics ==
The team gained an average of 245.0 rushing yards and 78.1 passing yards per game. The Cowboys' average of 245 rushing yards per game ranked sixth nationally among major college teams. On defense, Wyoming gave up an average of 89.2 rushing yards and 78.7 passing yards per game. The team's total defense of 167.9 yards per game ranked fifth nationally among major college teams.

Senior quarterback and co-captain Chuck Lamson played on both offense and defense and led the team in total offense, rushing, and scoring. He tallied 623 yards of total offense. As a passer, he completed 13 of 25 passes (52.0%) for 172 yards with two touchdowns, one interception and a 128.2 quarterback rating. He also tallied a team-high 451 rushing yards on 93 carries for an average of 4.8 yards per carry. Lamson also tied for the team's leadership in scoring with 32 points on four touchdowns and eight of eleven points after touchdown.

Senior quarterback Andy Melosky ranked second with 534 yards of total offense. He led the team in passing yardage, completing 33 of 72 passes (45.8%) for 464 yards with three touchdowns, four interceptions, and a 102.6 quarterback rating. He also tallied 70 rushing yards on 24 carries.

Sophomore halfback Mike Walker tied with Lamson for scoring leadership with 32 points on five touchdowns and two points after touchdown. Walker led the team in receiving with nine receptions for 118 yards. Walker also ranked third on the team with 350 rushing yards on 91 carries.

Senior fullback and co-captain Bob Bisacre finished second in rushing with 368 yards on 82 carries for a 4.5-yard average.

== Awards and honors ==
Three Wyoming players received first-team honors from the Associated Press on its 1961 Skyline Conference all-star football team: Chuck Lamson at quarterback; Daryl Mathews at guard; and Lonnie Dunn at end. Three others received second-team honors: Mike Walker at back; Chuck Schmitt at end; and Dan Grego at tackle.
