= Rose Hills, Los Angeles =

Rose Hills
- Neighborhood of Los Angeles
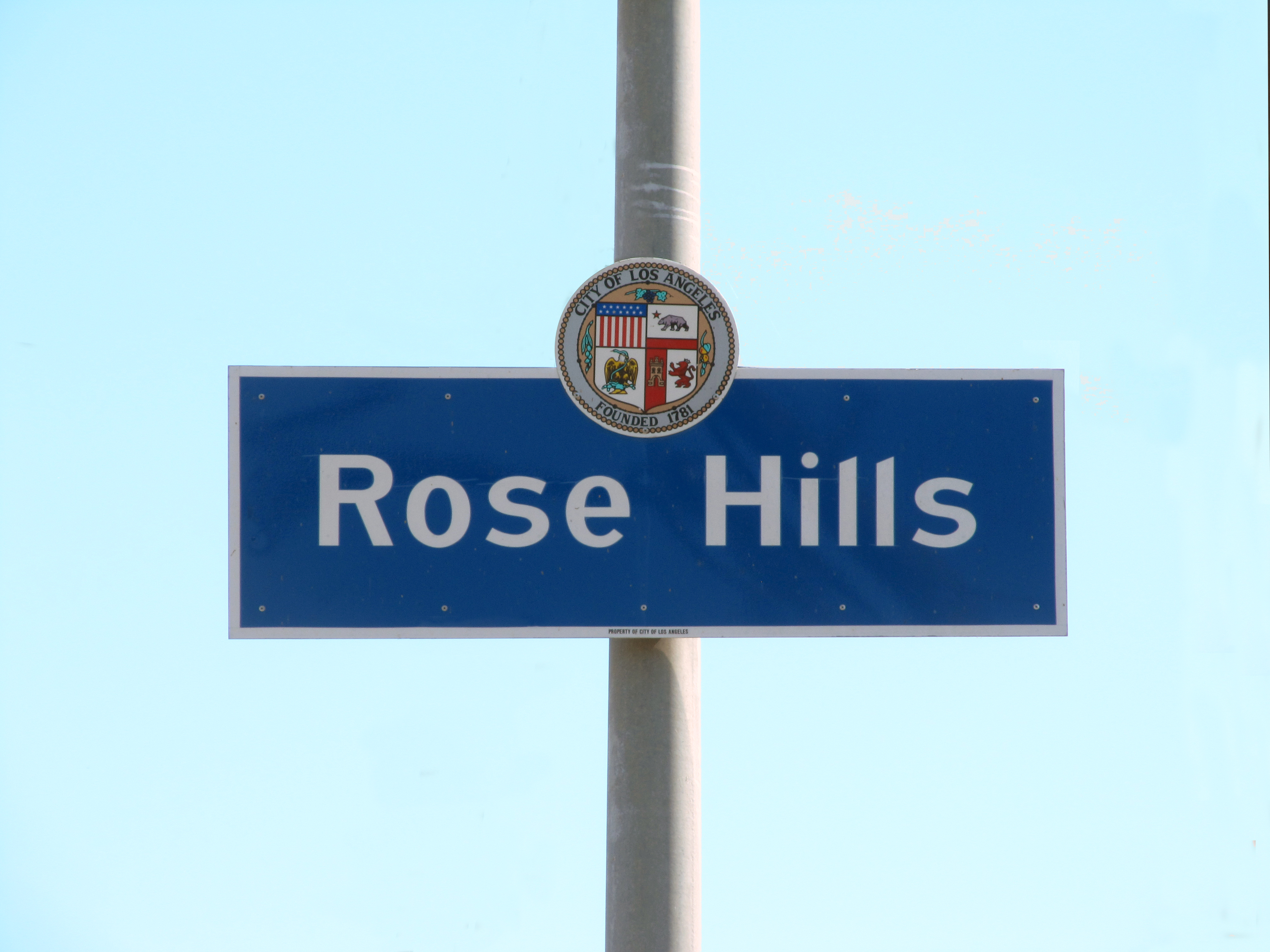
- Rose Hills neighborhood sign located at the intersection of Huntington Drive and Collis Avenue

- Location within Central Los Angeles
- Coordinates: 34.085943°N 118.190907°W
- Country: United States
- State: California
- County: Los Angeles
- City: Los Angeles

Government
  - City Council: José Huizar
  - State Assembly: Wendy Carrillo (D)
  - State Senate: Kevin de Leon (D)
  - U.S. House: Xavier Becerra (D)
- Time zone: UTC-8 (PST)
  - Summer (DST): UTC-7 (PDT)
- ZIP code: 90032
- Area code: 323

Rose Hills is a neighborhood on the Eastside of Los Angeles.

== History ==
=== Origin ===
The Rose Hill tract was subdivided in October 1904 by real estate developers Grider & Hamilton. This was not, however, the first time "Rose Hill" was used as a tract name in the Los Angeles area. In 1886, an area in Pasadena was named Rose Hill. In 1904, there was also a tract west of downtown Los Angeles that bore the same name.

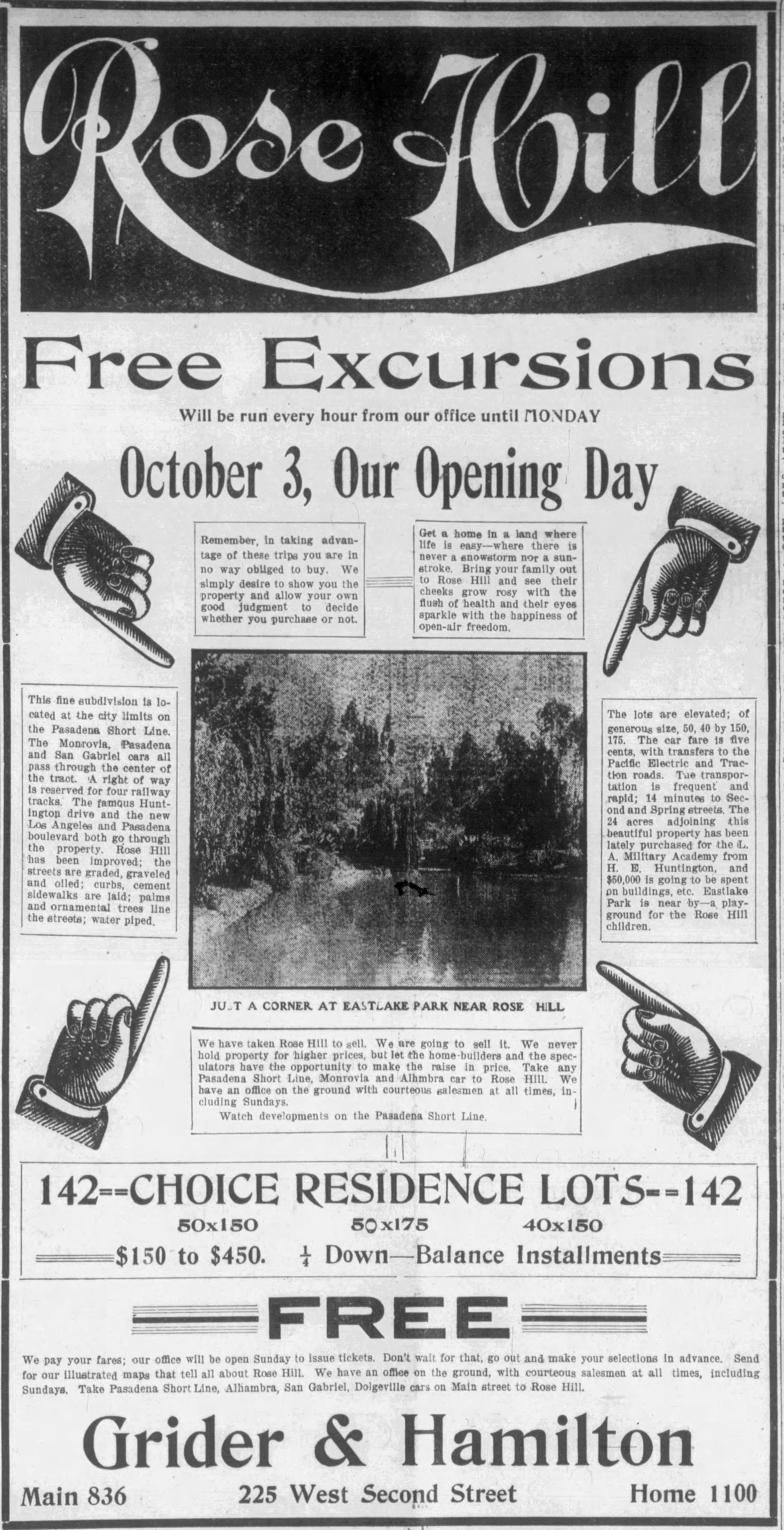
Rose Hill tract, 1904

=== 1920s ===
In 1921, residents protested "the establishment of a high class Japanese residential district" near Rose Hills. An anti-Japanese banner was hung across Huntington Drive and was removed by the police. Residents claimed no knowledge of who hung the sign. The Rose Hill Civic Improvement League stated that they did not sanction the sign, but did agree with the sentiment. The sign was later reinstalled on private property.

Also in 1921, the Rose Hill Civic Association protested the encroachment of oil wells in the community.

In 1922, women from the Civic Improvement League sought to raise funds to buy a bus to transport residents to the end of the yellow car line. The bus system was planned because the community was 3 blocks beyond the "6-cent zone" and the Improvement League was trying to convince the agency to adjust the dividing point between the inner and outer zones.

=== 1950s ===
In 1950, the federal government considered putting public housing in Rose Hills and Happy Valley. A resident of the Monterey Woods Improvement Association filed suit to prevent the project. Concurrently, residents of adjacent Montecito believed that residents of Rose Hills should accept the project as "their civic duty".

In the 1950s, there was an ongoing fight to locate Los Angeles State College in the Rose Hills section of El Sereno.

In 1954, the Rose Hill playground on Mercury Avenue opened.The recreation center building was constructed at a cost of $80,000 and was funded from a bond issued in 1947.

In 1956, there was a proposal by councilmember Ernest E Debs to build a golf course in El Sereno's Rose Hill.

=== 2000s ===
In 2006, The Rose Hills Neighborhood and Community Alliance gathered signatures on a petition stating that "the community of Rose Hills is requesting that our representative of the 14th District Council Office initiate a motion to request the City Council of Los Angeles to support the installation of additional community signs for recognition". Letters of support were submitted by state senator Ed Hernandez, Our Lady of Guadalupe Church, the Lincoln Heights Neighborhood Council and others.

A letter of support submitted by the Los Angeles Public library stating that "Los Angeles Public Library "recognizes Rose Hills, also once known as Rancho Rosa de Castilla, as an historic area in Los Angeles" was later clarified. A representative of the library later stated that the map librarian "does not have the authority to recognize historic areas in any official manner" and that "it would have been more appropriate for that letter to have merely stated the Library has maps that contain the appellation Rose Hill."

The El Sereno Historical Society was opposed to the naming and maintained that Rose Hills was part of El Sereno. More than 60 individuals showed up at the city council meeting to oppose the recognition and accompanying neighborhood signs.

== Geography ==
On September 12, 2013, city council issued a motion stating that "the community of Rose Hills has been in existence for hundreds of years". It noted that Rose Hills was among several communities surrounding El Sereno and instructed the Department of Transportation to install five neighborhood signs at the following locations: Monterey Road at the Monterey Road Pass, Huntington Drive North and Collis Avenue, Soto Street and Mission Road, before the Soto Street Bridge, Mission Road and Broadway Place, and Mercury Avenue and Reynolds Avenue.

The neighborhood of Hermon is located to the north, with signage installed on the north side of the Monterey Road Pass

== Education ==
- Huntington Drive Elementary School - 4435 N Huntington Drive (opened in 1909 as Rose Hill Elementary School)

== Parks and recreation ==
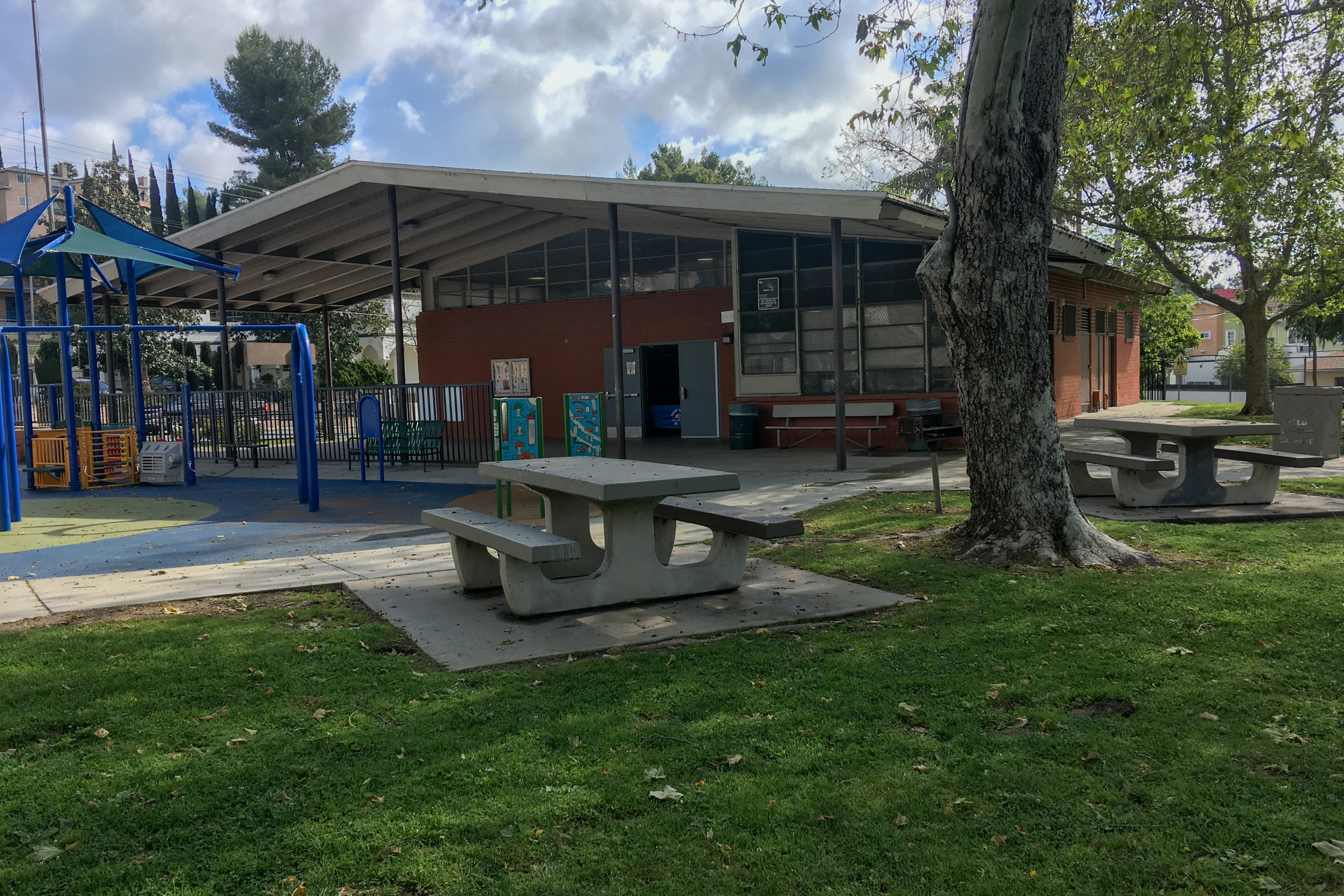
Rose Hill Recreation Center, 2024

- Rose Hill Recreation Center - 4560 Mercury Avenue
- Rose Hill Park - 3606 N. Boundary Avenue
