= 1961 West Texas State Buffaloes football team =

American college football season

1961 West Texas State Buffaloes football
- Conference: Border Conference
- Record: 6–4 (3–1 Border)
- Head coach: Joe Kerbel (2nd season)
- Home stadium: Buffalo Bowl

1961 Border Conference football standings
	Conf.					Overall
Team	W		L		T	W		L		T
Arizona State §	3	–	0	–	0	7	–	3	–	0
West Texas State	3	–	1	–	0	6	–	4	–	0
New Mexico State	2	–	1	–	0	5	–	4	–	1
Texas Western	1	–	3	–	0	3	–	7	–	0
Hardin–Simmons	0	–	4	–	0	0	–	10	–	0
$ – Conference champion

The 1961 West Texas State Buffaloes football team was an American football team that represented West Texas State College (now known as West Texas A&M University) as a member of the Border Conference during the 1961 college football season. In their second season under head coach Joe Kerbel, the Buffaloes compiled a 6–4 record (3–1 in conference games), finished in second place in the Border Conference, and outscored opponents by a total of 309 to 221.

Highlights of the season included a 27–23 victory over Arizona (the only loss for No. 18 Arizona) and high-scoring victories over BYU (55–8), Texas Western (56–27), and Hardin–Simmons (42–0).

Halfback Pete "Pistol Pete" Pedro ranked second among all major college players in the country in rushing (976 yards) and scoring (132 points) and led the country with 22 touchdowns. Pedro and guard Stu Johnson were selected as first-team players on the 1961 All-Border Conference football team.

The team played its home games at the Buffalo Bowl (later renamed Kimbrough Memorial Stadium) in Canyon, Texas.

== Schedule ==
Date	Opponent	Site	Result	Attendance	Source
September 23	BYU*	Buffalo Bowl; Canyon, TX	W 55–8	12,000–13,000	
September 30	at Texas Western	Kidd Field; El Paso, TX	W 56–27	12,000	
October 7	Wichita*	Buffalo Bowl; Canyon, TX	L 34–41	15,000	
October 14	Arizona State^{†}	Buffalo Bowl; Canyon, TX	L 11–28	17,000	
October 21	Hardin–Simmons	Buffalo Bowl; Canyon, TX	W 42–0	10,000	
October 28	Arizona*	Buffalo Bowl; Canyon, TX	W 27–23	12,000	
November 4	at Bowling Green*	University Stadium; Bowling Green, OH	L 6–28	11,000–11,250	
November 11	at Trinity (TX)*	Alamo Stadium; San Antonio, TX	W 29–28	2,000	
November 18	at New Mexico State	Memorial Stadium; Las Cruces, NM	W 35–22	7,100	
December 2	at Texas Tech*	Jones Stadium; Lubbock, TX	L 14–16	25,000	
*Non-conference game; ^{†}Homecoming

== Statistics ==
The 1961 Buffaloes gained an average of 247.5 rushing yards and 81.5 passing yards per game. On defense, they gave up 205.3 rushing yards and 47.7 passing yards per game.

Pete "Pistol Pete" Pedro ranked second among all major college players in the country with 976 rushing yards on 137 carries for an average of 7.12 yards per carry. He also ranked second in the country in scoring with 132 points and led the country with 22 touchdowns. Pedro's scoring total included six touchdowns against Texas Western.

Quarterback Jim Dawson completed 46 of 92 yards (50%) for 566 yards with seven touchdowns, eight interceptions, and a 109.4 quarterback rating.

Behind Pedro, the team's other leading rushers were Bill Lorance (452 yards, 90 carries, 5.0-yard average), Ollie Ross (346 yards, 68 carries, 5.1-yard average), and Jerry Don Logan (228 yards, 32 carries, 7.1-yard average).

== Awards and honors ==
Two West Texas players received first-team honors on the 1961 All-Border Conference football team based on a poll of the conference coaches. The West Texas honorees were Pete Pedro at halfback and Stu Johnson at guard. In addition, halfback Jerry Logan, end Dean Faulkenberry, guard Bill Bradley, and center Frank Thrasher were named to the second team. End Joe Granato received honorable mention.
