= 1961 Montana Grizzlies football team =

American college football season

1961 Montana Grizzlies football
- Conference: Skyline Conference
- Record: 2–6 (2–4 Skyline)
- Head coach: Ray Jenkins (4th season)
- Home stadium: Dornblaser Field

1961 Skyline Conference football standings
	Conf.					Overall
Team	W		L		T	W		L		T
No. 10 Utah State +	5	–	0	–	1	9	–	1	–	1
Wyoming +	5	–	0	–	1	6	–	1	–	2
New Mexico	3	–	3	–	0	7	–	4	–	0
Utah	3	–	3	–	0	6	–	4	–	0
Montana	2	–	4	–	0	2	–	6	–	0
BYU	2	–	4	–	0	2	–	8	–	0
Colorado State	0	–	6	–	0	0	–	10	–	0
+ – Conference co-champions; Rankings from AP Poll

The 1961 Montana Grizzlies football team represented the University of Montana in the 1961 college football season as a member of the Skyline Conference (Skyline). The Grizzlies were led by fourth-year head coach Ray Jenkins, played their home games at Dornblaser Field and finished the season with a record of two wins and six losses (2–6, 2–4 Skyline).

This was the last year for the conference; the new Western Athletic Conference (WAC) debuted the next season; Montana was an independent in 1962 and a charter member of the Big Sky Conference in 1963.

== Schedule ==
Date	Opponent	Site	Result	Attendance	Source
September 16	vs. Wyoming	Daylis Stadium; Billings, MT	L 0–29	8,100	
September 23	at Utah State	old Romney Stadium; Logan, UT	L 6–54	8,122–8,123	
September 30	New Mexico^{†}	Dornblaser Field; Missoula, MT	W 40–8	8,000	
October 7	at BYU	old Cougar Stadium; Provo, UT	L 6–7	6,519	
October 21	Utah	Dornblaser Field; Missoula, MT	L 12–24		
October 28	Colorado State	Dornblaser Field; Missoula, MT	W 22–19	4,500	
November 11	at Montana State*	Gatton Field; Bozeman, MT (rivalry)	L 9–10	8,600	
November 18	vs. Idaho*	old Bronco Stadium; Boise, ID (Little Brown Stein)	L 14–16	6,000	
*Non-conference game; ^{†}Homecoming
