= 1961 BYU Cougars football team =

American college football season

1961 BYU Cougars football
- Conference: Skyline Conference
- Record: 2–8 (2–4 Skyline)
- Head coach: Hal Mitchell (1st season)
- Home stadium: Cougar Stadium

1961 Skyline Conference football standings
	Conf.					Overall
Team	W		L		T	W		L		T
No. 10 Utah State +	5	–	0	–	1	9	–	1	–	1
Wyoming +	5	–	0	–	1	6	–	1	–	2
New Mexico	3	–	3	–	0	7	–	4	–	0
Utah	3	–	3	–	0	6	–	4	–	0
Montana	2	–	4	–	0	2	–	6	–	0
BYU	2	–	4	–	0	2	–	8	–	0
Colorado State	0	–	6	–	0	0	–	10	–	0
+ – Conference co-champions; Rankings from AP Poll

The 1961 BYU Cougars football team represented Brigham Young University (BYU) as a member of the Skyline Conference during the 1961 college football season. In their first season under head coach Hal Mitchell, the Cougars compiled an overall record of 2–8 with a mark of 2–4 against conference opponents, tied for fifth place in the Skyline, and were outscored by all opponents by a combined total of 289 to 130.

The team's statistical leaders included Eldon Fortie with 469 passing yards, 422 rushing yards, and 891 yards of total offense, and Paul Allen with 261 receiving yards and 58 points scored.

== Schedule ==
Date	Opponent	Site	Result	Attendance	Source
September 16	San Jose State*	Cougar Stadium; Provo, UT	L 13–14	9,289	
September 23	at West Texas State*	Buffalo Bowl; Canyon, TX	L 8–55	12,000–13,000	
September 30	at North Texas State*	Fouts Field; Denton, TX	L 30–31	8,000	
October 7	Montana	Cougar Stadium; Provo, UT	W 7–6	6,519	
October 14	at Utah	Ute Stadium; Salt Lake City, UT (rivalry)	L 20–21		
October 21	at Wyoming	War Memorial Stadium; Laramie, WY	L 8–36	15,381	
November 4	Utah State	Cougar Stadium; Provo, UT (rivalry)	L 8–31	13,123	
November 11	Colorado State	Cougar Stadium; Provo, UT	W 30–16	8,144	
November 18	at Oregon State*	Parker Stadium; Corvallis, OR	L 0–35	8,495	
November 25	at New Mexico	University Stadium; Albuquerque, NM	L 6–34	11,020	
*Non-conference game
