= 1961 New Mexico State Aggies football team =

American college football season

1961 New Mexico State Aggies football
- Conference: Border Conference
- Record: 5–4–1 (2–1 Border)
- Head coach: Warren B. Woodson (4th season)
- Home stadium: Memorial Stadium

1961 Border Conference football standings
| | Conf. | | | | | Overall |
| Team | W | | L | | T | W | | L | | T |
|---|---|---|---|---|---|---|---|---|---|---|
| Arizona State § | 3 | – | 0 | – | 0 | 7 | – | 3 | – | 0 |
| West Texas State | 3 | – | 1 | – | 0 | 6 | – | 4 | – | 0 |
| New Mexico State | 2 | – | 1 | – | 0 | 5 | – | 4 | – | 1 |
| Texas Western | 1 | – | 3 | – | 0 | 3 | – | 7 | – | 0 |
| Hardin–Simmons | 0 | – | 4 | – | 0 | 0 | – | 10 | – | 0 |
$ – Conference champion

The 1961 New Mexico State Aggies football team represented New Mexico State University during the 1961 college football season. In their fourth year under head coach Warren B. Woodson, the Aggies compiled a 5–4–1 record (2–1 against conference opponents) and finished in third place in the Border Conference.

The team's statistical leaders included Ron Logback with 796 passing yards, Preacher Pilot with 1,278 rushing yards, and R. Cassell with 519 receiving yards. For the third consecutive year, a New Mexico State back won the NCAA rushing title, Pervis Atkins in 1959, Bob Gaiters in 1960, and Preacher Pilot in 1961.

Head coach Warren Woodson was later inducted into the College Football Hall of Fame.

== Schedule ==
| Date | Opponent | Site | Result | Attendance | Source |
|---|---|---|---|---|---|
| September 16 | Arizona State–Flagstaff* | Memorial Stadium; Las Cruces, NM | W 56–6 | 8,000–8,150 | |
| September 23 | at New Mexico* | University Stadium; Albuquerque, NM (rivalry) | L 7–41 | 23,486 | |
| September 30 | McMurry* | Memorial Stadium; Las Cruces, NM | W 35–7 | 8,500 | |
| October 7 | at North Texas State* | Fouts Field; Denton, TX | T 14–14 | 8,000 | |
| October 14 | Pacific (CA)* | Memorial Stadium; Las Cruces, NM | W 70–19 | 8,200 | |
| October 21 | at Wichita*^{†} | Veterans Field; Wichita, KS | L 27–42 | 11,260 | |
| October 28 | at Texas Western | Kidd Field; El Paso, TX (rivalry) | W 42–6 | 12,000 | |
| November 4 | at Trinity (TX)* | Alamo Stadium; San Antonio, TX | L 14–17 | 1,743 | |
| November 18 | West Texas State | Memorial Stadium; Las Cruces, NM | L 22–35 | 7,100 | |
| November 25 | Hardin–Simmons | Memorial Stadium; Las Cruces, NM | W 54–8 | < 4,000 | |
*Non-conference game; ^{†}Homecoming
