= 1961 Colorado State Rams football team =

American college football season

1961 Colorado State Rams football
- Conference: Skyline Conference
- Record: 0–10 (0–6 Skyline)
- Head coach: Don Mullison (6th season)
- Home stadium: Colorado Field

1961 Skyline Conference football standings
	Conf.					Overall
Team	W		L		T	W		L		T
No. 10 Utah State +	5	–	0	–	1	9	–	1	–	1
Wyoming +	5	–	0	–	1	6	–	1	–	2
New Mexico	3	–	3	–	0	7	–	4	–	0
Utah	3	–	3	–	0	6	–	4	–	0
Montana	2	–	4	–	0	2	–	6	–	0
BYU	2	–	4	–	0	2	–	8	–	0
Colorado State	0	–	6	–	0	0	–	10	–	0
+ – Conference co-champions; Rankings from AP Poll

The 1961 Colorado State Rams football team was an American football team that represented Colorado State University in the Skyline Conference during the 1961 college football season. In their sixth season under head coach Don "Tuffy" Mullison, the Rams compiled a 0–10 record (0–6 against Skyline opponents), finished last in the Skyline Conference, and were outscored by a total of 249 to 74.

Three days after the last game of the season, Mullison was fired as the school's head coach. Mullison had been asked to resign, but refused. The Rams had lost 18 straight games dating back to October 15, 1960.

The Skyline Conference disbanded after the 1961 season, and Colorado State became an independent for the 1962 season.

== Schedule ==
Date	Opponent	Site	Result	Attendance	Source
September 16	at Utah	Ute Stadium; Salt Lake City, UT	L 0–40	16,274	
September 23	at Arizona*	Arizona Stadium; Tucson, AZ	L 6–28	24,300	
September 30	Arizona State*	Colorado Field; Fort Collins, CO	L 6–14	8,800	
October 7	at San Jose State*	Spartan Stadium; San Jose, CA	L 0–14	15,000	
October 14	at Wyoming	War Memorial Stadium; Laramie, WY (rivalry)	L 7–18	11,808	
October 21	Utah State^{†}	Colorado Field; Fort Collins, CO	L 3–49	10,700	
October 28	at Montana	Dornblaser Field; Missoula, MT	L 19–22	4,500	
November 4	at Air Force*	DU Stadium; Denver, CO (rivalry)	L 9–14	14,000–14,100	
November 11	at BYU	Cougar Stadium; Provo, UT	L 16–30	8,144	
November 18	New Mexico	Colorado Field; Fort Collins, CO	L 8–20	4,500	
*Non-conference game; ^{†}Homecoming

== Statistics ==
The team gained an average of 160.0 rushing yards and 77.3 passing yards per game. On defense, they gave up an average of 207.3 rushing yards and 109.0 passing yards per game.

The team's passing leaders were LeeRoy Gutierrez (37 of 82 for 387 yards with two touchdowns and five interceptions) and Bill Berringer (27 of 64 for 307 yards, 0 touchdowns and 10 interceptions).

The team's rushing leaders were Dennis Wohlhueter (308 yards, 69 carries, 4.5 yard average), Ken Hines (202 yards, 50 carries, 4.0 yard average), Alex Humackich (189 yards, 40 carries, 4.7 yard average), Ron Kaanehe (187 yards, 57 carries, 3.3 yard average), Rich Brown (185 yards, 39 carries, 4.7 yard average).

The team's receiving leaders were Kay McFarland (18 receptions, 196 yards) and Dennis Wohlhueter (12 receptions, 131 yards).

Three players tied for the scoring lead with 12 points each: Dennis Wohlhueter, Kay McFarland, and Ken Hines.
