= 1961 Hardin–Simmons Cowboys football team =

American college football season

1961 Hardin–Simmons Cowboys football
- Conference: Border Conference
- Record: 0–10 (0–4 Border)
- Head coach: Howard McChesney (2nd season)
- Home stadium: Shotwell Stadium

1961 Border Conference football standings
	Conf.					Overall
Team	W		L		T	W		L		T
Arizona State §	3	–	0	–	0	7	–	3	–	0
West Texas State	3	–	1	–	0	6	–	4	–	0
New Mexico State	2	–	1	–	0	5	–	4	–	1
Texas Western	1	–	3	–	0	3	–	7	–	0
Hardin–Simmons	0	–	4	–	0	0	–	10	–	0
$ – Conference champion

The 1961 Hardin–Simmons Cowboys football team was an American football team that represented Hardin–Simmons University in the Border Conference during the 1961 college football season. In its second and final season under head coach Howard McChesney, the team compiled a 0–10 record (0–4 against conference opponents), finished in last place in the conference, and was outscored by a total of 377 to 43.

No Hardin-Simmons players were named to the 1961 All-Border Conference football team.

== Schedule ==
Date	Opponent	Site	Result	Attendance	Source
September 16	at Tulsa*	Skelly Stadium; Tulsa, OK	L 0–27	14,408	
September 23	North Texas State*	Shotwell Stadium; Abilene, TX	L 7–9	4,000	
September 30	at Memphis State*	Crump Stadium; Memphis, TN	L 0–56	10,000–10,285	
October 7	at Arizona*	Arizona Stadium; Tucson, AZ	L 7–53	25,179	
October 14	Abilene Christian*	Shotwell Stadium; Abilene, TX	L 0–27	9,000	
October 21	at West Texas State	Buffalo Bowl; Canyon, TX	L 0–42	10,000	
October 28	at Arizona State	Sun Devil Stadium; Tempe, AZ	L 0–47	21,112	
November 4	Texas Western	Shotwell Stadium; Abilene, TX	L 7–35	2,500	
November 11	at McMurry*	Shotwell Stadium; Abilene, TX	L 14–27	3,000	
November 25	at New Mexico State	Memorial Stadium; Las Cruces, NM	L 8–54	< 4,000	
*Non-conference game
