= 1961 New Mexico Lobos football team =

American college football season

1961 New Mexico Lobos football

Aviation Bowl champion

Aviation Bowl, W 28–12 vs. Western Michigan
- Conference: Skyline Conference
- Record: 7–4 (3–3 Skyline)
- Head coach: Bill Weeks (2nd season)
- Home stadium: University Stadium

1961 Skyline Conference football standings
	Conf.					Overall
Team	W		L		T	W		L		T
No. 10 Utah State +	5	–	0	–	1	9	–	1	–	1
Wyoming +	5	–	0	–	1	6	–	1	–	2
New Mexico	3	–	3	–	0	7	–	4	–	0
Utah	3	–	3	–	0	6	–	4	–	0
Montana	2	–	4	–	0	2	–	6	–	0
BYU	2	–	4	–	0	2	–	8	–	0
Colorado State	0	–	6	–	0	0	–	10	–	0
+ – Conference co-champions; Rankings from AP Poll

The 1961 New Mexico Lobos football team was an American football team that represented the University of New Mexico in the Skyline Conference during the 1961 college football season. In their second season under head coach Bill Weeks, the Lobos compiled a 7–4 record (3–3 in conference games), finished in a tie for third place in the conference, and outscored opponents by a total of 215 to 197. The Lobos concluded their season with a victory over Western Michigan in the inaugural Aviation Bowl, played in snow and sleet at Dayton, Ohio.

The Lobos ran a wing-T offense featuring speedy backs and pulling guards. The offense was led by quarterback Jim Cromartie (533 passing yards, 168 rushing yards) and halfback Bobby Santiago (535 rushing yards, 107 receiving yards, five touchdowns).

The team played home games at University Stadium in Albuquerque, New Mexico.

== Schedule ==
Date	Opponent	Site	Result	Attendance	Source
September 23	New Mexico State*	University Stadium; Albuquerque, NM (rivalry)	W 41–7	24,000	
September 30	at Montana	Dornblaser Field; Missoula, MT	L 8–40	8,000	
October 7	Texas Western*	University Stadium; Albuquerque, NM	W 7–6	16,815	
October 14	at Utah State	Romney Stadium; Logan, UT	L 7–41	8,051	
October 21	at Arizona*	Arizona Stadium; Tucson, AZ (rivalry)	L 21–22		
October 28	Air Force*	University Stadium; Albuquerque, NM	W 21–6	17,130	
November 4	Utah^{†}	University Stadium; Albuquerque, NM	W 21–16	15,770	
November 11	Wyoming	University Stadium; Albuquerque, NM	L 7–33	20,113	
November 18	at Colorado State	Colorado Field; Fort Collins, CO	W 20–8	4,500	
November 25	BYU	University Stadium; Albuquerque, NM	W 34–6	11,020	
December 9	vs. Western Michigan*	Welcome Stadium; Dayton, OH (Aviation Bowl)	W 28–12	3,694	
*Non-conference game; ^{†}Homecoming

== Statistics ==
The team gained an average of 231.1 rushing yards and 71.0 passing yards per game. On defense, they gave up an average of 224.1 rushing yards and 118.9 passing yards per game.

Quarterback Jim Cromartie led the team in passing, completing 28 of 60 passes (46.7 completion percentage) for 533 yards, four touchdowns, and six interceptions.

The team's receiving leaders were Bobby Santiago (535 yards on 98 carries, 5.5-yard average), Bob Morgan (489 yards on 77 carries, 6.4-yard average), Herb Bradford (267 yards on 64 carries, 4.2-yard average), Gary Ness (229 yards on 55 carries, 4.3-yard average), and Jim Cromartie (168 yards on 86 carries, 2.0-yard average).

Larry Jasper led in receiving with five catchers for 161 receiving yards (32.2-yard average) and two touchdowns. Other leading receivers were Herb Bradford (five receptions, 130 yards, 26-yard average) and Bobby Santiago (eight receptions for 107 yards, 13.4-yard average).

Bobby Santiago led the team in scoring with 30 points on five rushing touchdowns. Jim Cromartie followed with 24 points on four rushing touchdowns.
