= 1961 Utah Utes football team =

American college football season

1961 Utah Utes football
- Conference: Skyline Conference
- Record: 6–4 (3–3 Skyline)
- Head coach: Ray Nagel (4th season)
- Home stadium: Ute Stadium

1961 Skyline Conference football standings
	Conf.					Overall
Team	W		L		T	W		L		T
No. 10 Utah State +	5	–	0	–	1	9	–	1	–	1
Wyoming +	5	–	0	–	1	6	–	1	–	2
New Mexico	3	–	3	–	0	7	–	4	–	0
Utah	3	–	3	–	0	6	–	4	–	0
Montana	2	–	4	–	0	2	–	6	–	0
BYU	2	–	4	–	0	2	–	8	–	0
Colorado State	0	–	6	–	0	0	–	10	–	0
+ – Conference co-champions; Rankings from AP Poll

The 1961 Utah Utes football team, or also commonly known as the Utah Redskins, was an American football team that represented the University of Utah as a member of the Skyline Conference during the 1961 college football season. In their fourth season under head coach Ray Nagel, the Utes compiled an overall record of 6–4 with a mark of 3–3 against conference opponents, tying for third place in the Skyline. Home games were played on campus at Ute Stadium in Salt Lake City.

Utah did not face longtime rival Colorado in the previous two years. This season the Utes upset the No. 8 Buffaloes at Folsom Field in Boulder, Colorado, Utah's first win in the rivalry since 1948. After 1962, the series went on hiatus until 2011, when both schools joined the Pac-12 Conference.

== Schedule ==
Date	Opponent	Site	Result	Attendance	Source
September 16	Colorado State	Ute Stadium; Salt Lake City, UT	W 40–0	16,274	
September 23	at Wisconsin*	Camp Randall Stadium; Madison, WI	L 0–7	36,325	
September 30	Oregon*	Ute Stadium; Salt Lake City, UT	W 14–6	26,578	
October 7	at Arizona State*	Sun Devil Stadium; Tempe, AZ	W 28–26	31,300	
October 14	BYU	Ute Stadium; Salt Lake City, UT (rivalry)	W 21–20		
October 21	at Montana	Dornblaser Field; Missoula, MT	W 24–12		
October 28	Wyoming^{†}	Ute Stadium; Salt Lake City, UT	L 6–13	19,151	
November 4	at New Mexico	University Stadium; Albuquerque, NM	L 16–21	15,770	
November 11	at No. 8 Colorado*	Folsom Field; Boulder, CO (rivalry)	W 21–12	25,000	
November 18	Utah State	Ute Stadium; Salt Lake City, UT (rivalry)	L 6–17	32,437	
*Non-conference game; ^{†}Homecoming; Rankings from AP Poll released prior to the game

== NFL draft ==
One Utah player was selected in the 1962 NFL draft.

Player	Position	Round	Pick	NFL team
Ed Pine	Center	2	22	San Francisco 49ers
