= Jack MacArthur =

American pastor (1914-2005)

Pastor Jack MacArthur
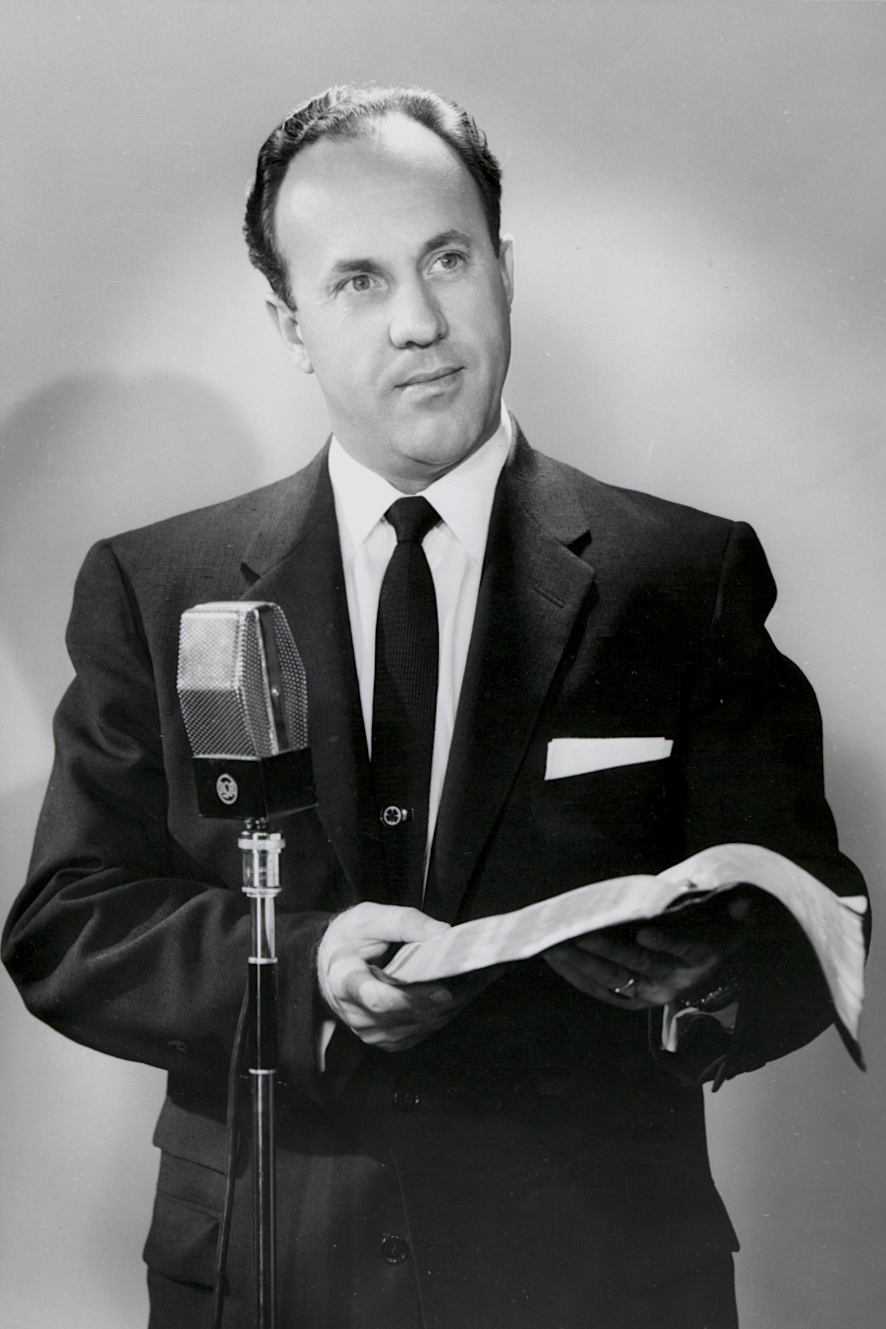
- Born: March 30, 1914; Calgary, Alberta, Canada
- Died: June 15, 2005 (aged 91)
- Education: Los Angeles City College; Eastern Baptist Theological Seminary in Philadelphia (Theology degree)
- Occupations: Minister, writer, broadcaster
- Known for: Clergymen
- Spouse: Irene MacArthur
- Children: John, Jeanette, Julie, and Jane
- Honors: Los Angeles Pacific College (defunct) (Litt.D.); Bob Jones University (D.D.)

John Fullerton MacArthur Sr. (March 30, 1914 – June 15, 2005) was an American pastor who was the founder and senior pastor at Calvary Bible Church in Burbank, California. He was the founder and host of the "Voice of Calvary" radio and television ministries, conference speaker, author, church planter, and father of pastor John F. MacArthur.

== Childhood ==
MacArthur was born in Calgary, Alberta, to Harry MacArthur (1890 - 1950), and Olivia Fullerton MacArthur (1892 - 1967). Harry was born in Summerside, Prince Edward Island, and Olivia's father was Rev. Thomas F. Fullerton, DD (1861 - 1921), a Presbyterian Church in Canada minister who served St. James Kirk in Charlottetown, Prince Edward Island from 1893 - 1921, who came from Scotland, serving previously in Australia, and at St. John, New Brunswick, where she was born. Her Paternal grandfather was reported to have been a minister in Scotland.

== Education ==
MacArthur grew up in Los Angeles, California, and graduated from Los Angeles City College and Eastern Baptist Theological Seminary in Philadelphia with best friend and roommate Rev. Raymond Ronald Robinson, a Virginian, of the Grace Brethren Churches.

Subsequently, while his son John was an undergraduate at Los Angeles Pacific College (defunct), a four-year microcollege, MacArthur was awarded an honorary doctorate of literature from the same school. In 1945, he was also awarded another honorary degree from Bob Jones College.

== Personal life ==
After marrying on June 25, 1937, MacArthur and his wife Irene (née Dockendorf) raised four children, including their oldest, pastor John MacArthur. John later wrote about his father: "It was my father's preaching that made the greatest impact. You don't grow up a pastor's son without hearing a few thousand sermons - some more than once...[but] what I found as I watched - and what has most profoundly influenced me - was that my father's life rang true...in a word, what he taught me was the value of integrity."

== Early ministry years ==
After MacArthur finished seminary, he first accepted the pastorate at Manchester Baptist Church in Los Angeles. MacArthur also traveled as an evangelist, preaching at many city and union campaigns throughout the United States, Canada, and Europe.

Later, he served as director of evangelism for the Charles F. Fuller Foundation and as a field evangelist for the Moody Bible Institute of Chicago. He became pastor at Fountain Avenue Baptist Church on January 4, 1948 and served for four years. From 1952 to 1954, he was pastor of the First Baptist Church of Downey.

== Calvary Bible Church and "Voice of Calvary" ==
In November 1954, MacArthur and his staff left that church to establish the independent, nondenominational Harry MacArthur Memorial Bible Church of Glendale, which was named for his father; it was later renamed Calvary Bible Church after moving to Burbank, where he served as senior pastor for 50 years.

While still pastoring in Southern California, he and Dr. J. Edwin Orr founded an outreach ministry to people in the film and television industry in the early 1940s" where Roy Rogers and Dale Evans came to Christ under his preaching in 1948, and eventually, lifelong friends. In 1942, the fruit of this endeavor was the "Voice of Calvary" radio program (which he hosted until his passing). Between 1956 and 1983, the program was also adapted for television. MacArthur supported the ministry of John M. Perkins, so Perkins named the ministry Voice of Calvary, a nod to MacArthur's radio program.
