= 1961 Utah State Aggies football team =

American college football season

1961 Utah State Aggies football

Skyline co-champion

Gotham Bowl, L 9–24 vs. Baylor
- Conference: Skyline Conference

Ranking
- Coaches: No. 10
- AP: No. 10
- Record: 9–1–1 (5–0–1 Skyline)
- Head coach: John Ralston (3rd season)
- Home stadium: Romney Stadium

1961 Skyline Conference football standings
	Conf.					Overall
Team	W		L		T	W		L		T
No. 10 Utah State +	5	–	0	–	1	9	–	1	–	1
Wyoming +	5	–	0	–	1	6	–	1	–	2
New Mexico	3	–	3	–	0	7	–	4	–	0
Utah	3	–	3	–	0	6	–	4	–	0
Montana	2	–	4	–	0	2	–	6	–	0
BYU	2	–	4	–	0	2	–	8	–	0
Colorado State	0	–	6	–	0	0	–	10	–	0
+ – Conference co-champions; Rankings from AP Poll

The 1961 Utah State Aggies football team was an American football team that represented Utah State University as a member of the Skyline Conference during the 1961 college football season. In their third year head coach John Ralston, the Aggies compiled a 9–1–1 record (5–0–1 in conference games), tied with Wyoming for the Skyline championship, and outscored opponents by a total of 387 to 78. They were ranked No. 10 in the final AP and UPI polls. The Aggies were undefeated in the regular season, having scored an average of 37.8 points per game while holding opponents to 5.0 points per game. They then lost to Baylor, 24–9, in the 1961 Gotham Bowl in New York City. Utah State did not play in another bowl game until 1993.

Tom Larscheid led the team in both rushing (773 yards) and scoring (78 points). Tackle Merlin Olsen won the Outland Trophy and was a consensus All-American.

The team played its home games at Romney Stadium in Logan, Utah.

== Schedule ==
Date	Opponent	Rank	Site	Result	Attendance	Source
September 16	Texas Western*		Romney Stadium; Logan, UT	W 21–6	9,231	
September 23	Montana		Romney Stadium; Logan, UT	W 54–6	8,122–8,123	
September 30	vs. Washington State*		Memorial Stadium; Spokane, WA	W 34–14	13,000	
October 7	at Wyoming		War Memorial Stadium; Laramie, WY (rivalry)	T 6–6	18,090	
October 14	New Mexico		Romney Stadium; Logan, UT	W 41–7	8,051	
October 21	at Colorado State		Colorado Field; Fort Collins, CO	W 49–3	10,700	
October 28	Idaho*		Romney Stadium; Logan, UT	W 69–0	6,934	
November 4	at BYU		Cougar Stadium; Provo, UT (rivalry)	W 31–8	13,123	
November 11	at Western Michigan*		Waldo Stadium; Kalamazoo, MI	W 65–22	11,750–14,000	
November 18	at Utah		Ute Stadium; Salt Lake City, UT (rivalry)	W 17–6	32,437	
December 9	vs. Baylor*	No. 10	Polo Grounds; New York, NY (Gotham Bowl)	L 9–24	15,123	
*Non-conference game; Rankings from AP Poll released prior to the game

== Statistics ==
Tom Larscheid led the team with 773 rushing yards on 121 carries (6.4-yard average). Larscheid also tallied 178 receiving yards and led the team in scoring with 78 points on 13 touchdowns. He also had an 85-yard punt return versus Utah in 1961.

The team averaged over 300 rushing yards per game. In addition to Larscheid, leading rushers included Ray Harward (390 yards on 57 carries, 6.8-yard average); Ron Prince (336 yards on 50 carries, 6.7-yard average); and Larry Bryan (277 yards, 41 carries (6.8-yard average).

The team also had a strong quarterback group consisting of:

- Mel Montalbo led the group, completing 23 of 46 passes for 478 passing yards, seven touchdowns, one interception, and a 183.2 quarterback rating.
- Sophomore Bill Munson completed 23 of 53 passes (43.4%) for 323 yards with two touchdowns and two interceptions. Munson broke the school's passing record with 1,699 passing yards in 1963 Utah State and later played 16 years in the National Football League (NFL).
- Jim Turner completed 15 of 33 passes for 292 yards. Turner later played for 16 years as a placekicker in the American Football League (AFL) and NFL.

The team's leading receivers were Bill Dahme (248 yards, seven receptions), Tom Larscheid (178 yards, 10 receptions), and Carl Hunt (120 yards, five receptions).

The scoring leaders were Larscheid (78 points), Ray Harward (30 points), and four players with 18 points each (Terry Cagaanan, Ron Prince, Bill Dahme, and Larry Bryan).

== Awards ==
Tackle Merlin Olsen received numerous awards at the end of the 1961 season:

- Olsen won the Outland Trophy as the best guard or tackle during the 1961 college football season.
- Olsen was a consensus All-American, having received first-team designation by the Associated Press (AP), United Press International (UPI), Football Writers Association of America (FWAA), Newspaper Enterprise Association (NEA), and Time magazine.
- Olsen was one of eight linemen to receive the National Football Foundation's annual scholar athlete of the year award, chosen on the basis of "high scholastic standing and achievement, football ability and dedictaion and all-around leadership."

Five Utah State players received first-team honors on the official 1961 All-Skyline Conference football team chosen by a vote of the league's players. The Utah State players receiving first-team honors were: halfback Tom Larscheid; end L. Aldridge; tackles Merlin Olsen and Clark Miller; and guard W. Redmond. Second-team honors went to Utah State's Bill Dahme at end; Bill Dickey at guard; and Ray Harward at fullback.
