= 1961 Texas Western Miners football team =

American college football season

1961 Texas Western Miners football
- Conference: Border Conference
- Record: 3–7 (1–3 Border)
- Head coach: Ben Collins (5th season)
- Home stadium: Kidd Field

1961 Border Conference football standings
	Conf.					Overall
Team	W		L		T	W		L		T
Arizona State §	3	–	0	–	0	7	–	3	–	0
West Texas State	3	–	1	–	0	6	–	4	–	0
New Mexico State	2	–	1	–	0	5	–	4	–	1
Texas Western	1	–	3	–	0	3	–	7	–	0
Hardin–Simmons	0	–	4	–	0	0	–	10	–	0
$ – Conference champion

The 1961 Texas Western Miners football team was an American football team that represented Texas Western College (now known as University of Texas at El Paso) as a member of the Border Conference during the 1961 college football season. In their fifth and final season under head coach Ben Collins, the Miners compiled a 3–7 record (1–3 in conference games), finished fourth out of five teams in the Border Conference, and were outscored by a total of 283 to 176.

The team played its home games at Kidd Field in El Paso, Texas.

== Schedule ==
Date	Opponent	Site	Result	Attendance	Source
September 16	at Utah State*	Romney Stadium; Logan, UT	L 6–21	9,231	
September 30	West Texas State	Kidd Field; El Paso, TX	L 27–56	12,000	
October 7	at New Mexico*	University Stadium; Albuquerque, NM	L 6–7	16,815	
October 14	McMurry*	Kidd Field; El Paso, TX	W 20–16	8,000	
October 21	at Trinity (TX)*	Alamo Stadium; San Antonio, TX	W 19–14	2,344	
October 28	New Mexico State	Kidd Field; El Paso, TX	L 6–42	12,000	
November 4	at Hardin–Simmons	Shotwell Stadium; Abilene, TX	W 35–7	2,500	
November 11	Arizona State^{†}	Kidd Field; El Paso, TX	L 28–48	9,000	
November 18	at Arizona*	Arizona Stadium; Tucson, AZ	L 15–48	22,200	
November 25	North Texas State*	Kidd Field; El Paso, TX	L 14–24	5,000	
*Non-conference game; ^{†}Homecoming

== Statistics ==
The team tallied 159.5 rushing yards and 122.7 passing yards per game. On defense, the Miners gave up 239.5 rushing yards and 118.9 passing yards per game.

John Furman led both the team and the Border in passing, completing 85 of 180 passes for 1,026 yards with 10 touchdowns and 11 interceptions. He also led the team and the conference in total offense with 1,337 yards. Furman also handled punting duties for the team, tallying 50 punts for 1,879 yards, an average of 37.4 yards per punt.

Don Boyce led the team (and ranked fourth in the conference) in rushing with 611 yards on 138 carries for an average of 4.4 yards per carry. Boyce also led the team in scoring with 36 points on six touchdowns. Del Williams was the second leading scorer with 30 points on five touchdowns.

The team had two of the leading receivers in the Border Conference. Ralph Kennedy ranked second in the conference with 18 receptions for 349 yards (19.4 yards per catch), and Williams ranked fourth with 16 receptions for 169 yards.
