= Arleta Richardson =

American author

Arleta Richardson (Flint, Michigan, March 9, 1923 – July 25, 2004) was an American religious and children's author, librarian, and a teacher. The Grandma's Attic series was her most well known series. She belonged to the Free Methodist Church.

== Life ==
Arleta spent her early life in various parts of the midwest. She served in World War II. In 1944, she graduated from Spring Arbor Junior College. After graduation, she served in the army for over a year. In 1949, she graduated from Western Michigan University. She worked as a teacher and a librarian at several schools including: Spring Arbor Junior College, Los Angeles Pacific College, East Los Angeles Light & Life School, and Immaculate Heart School of Library Science. In 1974, her first novel in the Grandma's Attic series was published. Then, in 1994 the first book in her Orphans' Journey series was published. She wrote eight books for the CYC missions program after that. She was Director of Missions Education in the Women's Missionary Society for nine years. At the age of 81, she died of cancer.

== Awards ==
- 1968 ~ California Association of Christian Schools Teacher of the Year Award
- 1986 ~ Writer of the Year ~ Mount Hermon Christian Writers Conference
- June 1996 ~ Alumni of the Year Award ~ Spring Arbor University

== Books ==
=== Grandma's Attic ===
1. Richardson, Arleta (1974). In Grandma's Attic. David C Cook. ISBN 978-0-7814-0379-5.
2. Richardson, Arleta (1979). More Stories From Grandma's Attic. Chariot Books. ISBN 978-0-89191-131-9.
3. Richardson, Arleta (1999). Still More Stories From Grandma's Attic. Illustrated by Dora Leder. David C Cook. ISBN 978-0-7814-3270-2.
4. Richardson, Arleta (1999). Treasures from Grandma. Illustrated by Susan Jerde. David C Cook. ISBN 978-0-7814-3271-9.
5. Richardson, Arleta (2000). Away From Home. David C. Cook. ISBN 978-0-7814-3290-0.
6. Richardson, Arleta (2000). A School of Her Own. David C Cook. ISBN 978-0-7814-3291-7.
7. Richardson, Arleta (1987). Wedding Bells Ahead. Chariot Books. ISBN 978-1-55513-061-9.
8. Richardson, Arleta (2003). At Home in North Branch. David C. Cook. ISBN 978-0-7814-3534-5.
9. Richardson, Arleta (1989). New Faces, New Friends. David C. Cook Publishing Company. ISBN 978-0-7814-3533-8.
10. Richardson, Arleta (2003). Stories From the Growing Years. David C. Cook Publishing Company. ISBN 978-0-7814-3905-3.
- The first four are available in booked set. Richardson, Arleta (2012). Grandma's Attic Treasury. ISBN 978-0-7814-0669-7.

=== Grandma's Attic Companion Volumes ===
1. Richardson, Arleta (1991). Christmas Stories from Grandma's Attic. ISBN 978-0-7814-0090-9.
2. Richardson, Arleta (1995). A Day at the Fair. Illustrated by Mary O'Keefe Young. David C. Cook. ISBN 978-0-7814-0249-1.
3. Richardson, Arleta (1993). Grandma's Attic Cookbook. Chariot Books. ISBN 978-0-7814-0065-7.
4. Richardson, Arleta (1993). Grandma's Attic Storybook. D.C. Cook. ISBN 978-0-7814-0070-1.
5. Richardson, Arleta (1995). Letters From Grandma's Attic. Illustrated by Eileen Dineley. Chariot Books. ISBN 978-0-7814-0229-3.

=== Orphans' Journey series ===
1. Richardson, Arleta (2000). Looking for Home. David C Cook. ISBN 978-0-7814-3538-3.
2. Richardson, Arleta (2000). Whistle-Stop West. David C Cook. ISBN 978-0-7814-3537-6.
3. Richardson, Arleta (2001). Prairie Homestead. ISBN 978-0-7814-3536-9.
4. Richardson, Arleta (2001). Across the Border. ISBN 978-0-7814-3535-2.

=== Other books ===
- Richardson, Arleta (1983). My Jesus Pocketbook Of The Lords Prayer. ISBN 978-1-55513-014-5.
- Richardson, Arleta (1989). A Heart for God in India. ISBN 978-0-89367-144-0.
- Richardson, Arleta (1998). Maria. ISBN 978-0-89367-227-0.
- Richardson, Arleta (1988). Passport to South America. ISBN 978-0-89367-130-3.
- Richardson, Arleta (1989). Payne, Peggy; Yoder, Tamra (eds.). Andrew's Secret. Illustrated by Emeline Secaur. ISBN 978-0-89367-143-3.

=== Books contributed to ===
- Richardson, Arleta (2004). "Forward". In Glaesemann, Karen; LaHar, Devon (eds.). Growing up on Memory Lane. Illustrated by Vanessa Barrett. Pleasanton, California: Small Town USA. pp. ix–x. ISBN 978-0-9749009-0-2. OCLC 70810440. OL 30912220M.
