= Pacific Christian on the Hill =

Coordinates: 34.1029°N 118.1826°W

- Los Angeles, California; United States

Information
- Type: Private, college-prep
- Motto: In Christo Vera Educatio
- Opened: 1904
- Closed: 2004
- Grades: 7–12
- Gender: Coeducational
- Colors: Red and black
- Mascot: Black panther

Pacific Christian on the Hill was a small private college preparatory school located in the Hermon area of Los Angeles.

== Origins ==
Pacific Christian on the Hill (PCH), originally Pacific Christian High School, was founded in 1965, but its roots went back to 1904 with the formation of Los Angeles Free Methodist Seminary (later Los Angeles Pacific College) by the Free Methodist Church. When the college was torn down, a new high school was built on the lot on the hill under the guidance of an independent, interdenominational board of directors. A private college preparatory high school was created for grades 9–12. Later it added a junior high school, grades 7 and 8.

== School description ==
The school provided a liberal arts education with a strong foundation in the Christian faith. There were no religious affiliation requirements for entry and the students came from many different Protestant denominations. However, true to its origins, chapel services for the students were held every Wednesday at the local Free Methodist church (Hermon Community Church) located close by.

PCH was fully accredited by the Western Association of Schools and Colleges (WASC), a member of the Association of Christian Schools International (ACSI), California Scholarship Federation (CSF) and the California Interscholastic Federation (CIF) for athletics.

The school mascot was the panther. This was reflected in the name of the school yearbook, Pardalis, Greek for panther.

Structures on campus (1970s–2000s):
Lingren Hall: the main building housed the class rooms, library, lab, darkroom, book storage, and lockers.
The Panther Den: housed yearbook and journalism classes, restrooms, and lunch sales.
The Office: used to be a two-story building. Housed administration offices, teachers' lounge, computer lab, and girls' locker room.
Boy's Locker room: housed the locker room, weight room, athletic equipment storage, and general grounds storage.
The amphitheater: pictured on this page.
Observatory: as of the 1990s this was the oldest building remaining on campus.

== Student population ==
In addition to supporting Hermon area children, PCHS reached out to enroll students from other towns in the northeastern suburbs of Los Angeles. The school was attractive to Christian parents who preferred to have their children schooled in a Christian environment. Hence, PCH was able to attract students from towns such as neighboring Highland Park, California, South Pasadena as well as towns further afield in the San Gabriel Valley such as Pasadena, San Gabriel, San Marino, Rosemead, Temple City, Alhambra and Eagle Rock, California. Many of the students were graduates of Christian middle schools based in Pasadena and San Gabriel. A rival Christian high school, Maranatha High School, originally based in Arcadia and now in Pasadena, provided healthy competition for the enrollment of these students. Coincidentally, the two schools were founded in the same year, 1965.

A junior high (middle school, grades 7–8) was added in 1975.

Student population generally hovered around 150, from the late 1970s until a few years before the school closed. By 2003, student enrollment had declined to less than 100 overall, hastening the school's eventual financial demise. The graduating class of 1986 was the largest in many years at 28 students.

== Closure ==
The Bowl. A unique feature of the school was an open-air amphitheater used for assemblies, the yearly school play, and other events.

The school closed in the summer 2004 just before celebrating its 100th anniversary; the school simply had no money to continue operating. While the school grounds remained shuttered, the school board and the Hermon community discussed the future of the school and its properties. Hermon Community Church retained the right of first-refusal. The school board and the church prepared to enter the courts to settle the matter. However, an appropriate buyer, agreeable to both sides appeared and on December 7, 2006, the school board agreed to the sale of the 7-acre (28,000 m^{2}) site to Bethesda Christian University.

Since 1965 the school had only four principals:

- 1965–1983 Gerald W. Harer
- 1984–1988 Thomas Hagerty (Gerald W. Harer worked as superintendent)
- 1988–1989 Dr. Donald E. Riggs
- 1989–2004 Dr. Richard Riesen
