= Hal Mitchell =

American football player (1930–1993)

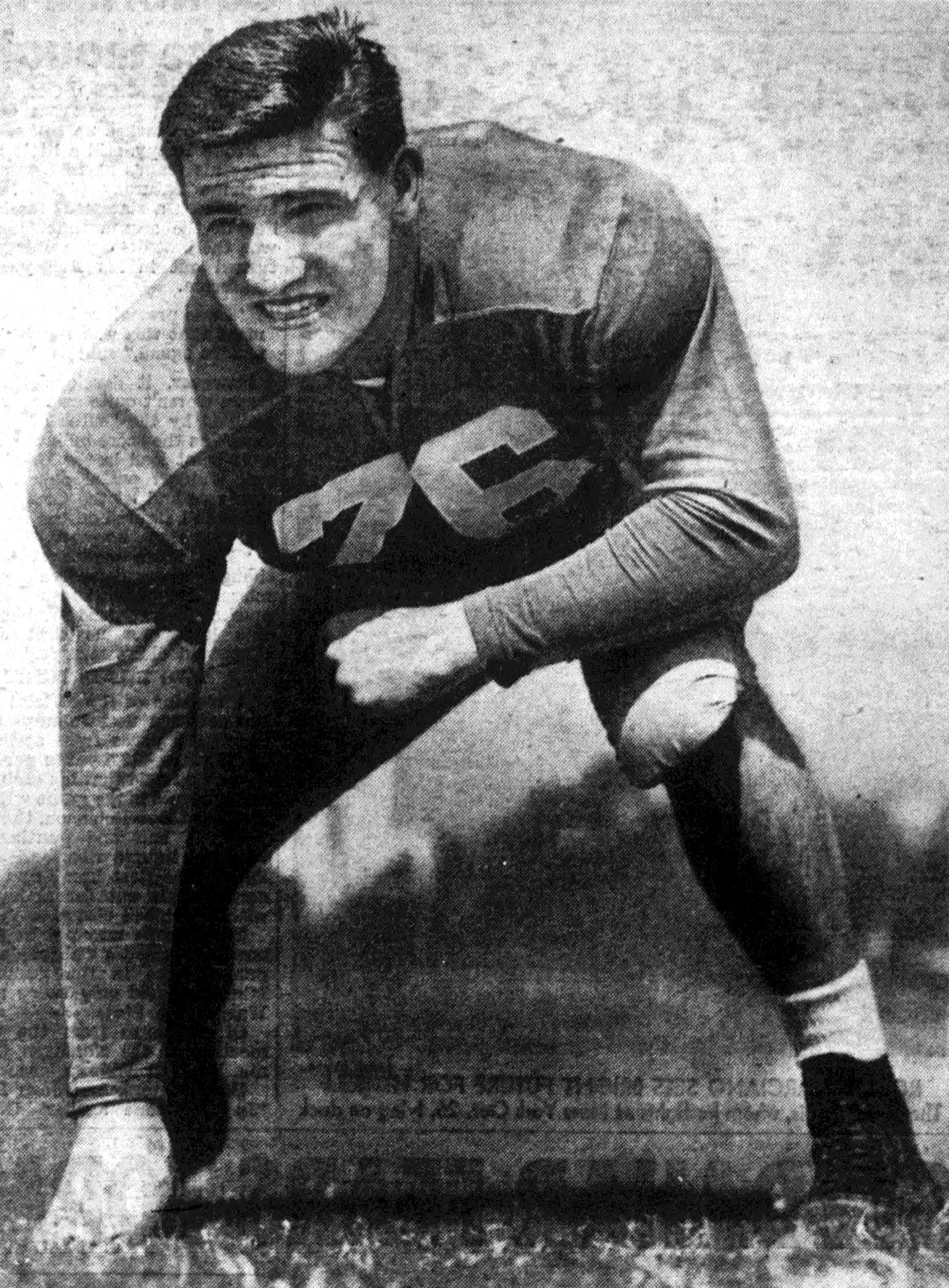
- Mitchell, circa 1951

No. 66
- Positions: Offensive tackle, guard

Personal information
- Born: August 11, 1930; Lawndale, California, U.S.
- Died: November 15, 1993 (aged 63); Corralitos, California, U.S.
- Listed height: 6 ft 1 in (1.85 m)
- Listed weight: 225 lb (102 kg)

Career information
- High school: Leuzinger (Lawndale)
- College: UCLA (1948–1951)
- NFL draft: 1952: 4th round, 167th overall pick

Career history

Playing
- New York Giants (1952)

Coaching
- BYU (1961–1963) Head coach

Awards and highlights
- WAC Coach of the Year (1962); First-team All-PCC (1951)

Career NFL statistics
- Games played: 11
- Games started: 7
- Fumble recoveries: 1
- Stats at Pro Football Reference

Head coaching record
- Career: 8–22 (.267)

Hal Dwane Mitchell (August 11, 1930 – November 15, 1993) was a professional American football offensive tackle in the National Football League (NFL) for the New York Giants. He played college football at the University of California, Los Angeles (UCLA) and was drafted in the 14th round of the 1952 NFL draft. Mitchell was the head football coach at Brigham Young University (BYU) from 1961 to 1963, compiling an 8–22 record. Mitchell died of cancer on November 27, 1993, at his home in Corralitos, California.

== Head coaching record ==
Year	Team	Overall	Conference	Standing	Bowl/playoffs
BYU Cougars (Skyline Conference) (1961)
1961	BYU	2–8	2–4	T–5th	
BYU Cougars (Western Athletic Conference) (1962–1963)
1962	BYU	4–6	2–2	T–3rd	
1963	BYU	2–8	0–4	6th	
BYU:		8–22	4–10		
Total:		8–22			
