= Chuck Lamson =

American football player (1939–2015)

No. 21, 44
- Position: Safety

Personal information
- Born: March 14, 1939; Webster City, Iowa, U.S.
- Died: November 23, 2015 (aged 76); Evergreen, Colorado, U.S.
- Listed height: 6 ft 0 in (1.83 m)
- Listed weight: 190 lb (86 kg)

Career information
- High school: Ames (Ames, Iowa)
- College: Iowa State (1957-1958); Wyoming (1960-1961)
- NFL draft: 1961: 4th round, 43rd overall pick

Career history
- Minnesota Vikings (1962–1963); Philadelphia Eagles (1964)*; Los Angeles Rams (1965–1967)
- * Offseason or practice squad member only

Career NFL statistics
- Interceptions: 11
- Fumble recoveries: 9
- Touchdowns: 1
- Stats at Pro Football Reference

Charles Watt Lamson (March 14, 1939 – November 23, 2015) was an American professional football player who was a defensive back for the Minnesota Vikings and Los Angeles Rams of the National Football League (NFL).
