= Eddie Wilson (American football) =

American football player (born 1940)

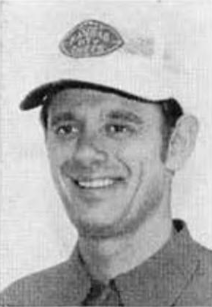
- Wilson, c. 1974

No. 12
- Positions: Quarterback, punter

Personal information
- Born: August 14, 1940 (age 86); Redding, California, U.S.
- Listed height: 6 ft 0 in (1.83 m)
- Listed weight: 190 lb (86 kg)

Career information
- High school: Chandler (Chandler, Arizona)
- College: Arizona
- NFL draft: 1962: 2nd round, 24th overall pick
- AFL draft: 1962: 3rd round, 19th overall pick

Career history

Playing
- Dallas Texans / Kansas City Chiefs (1962-1964); Boston Patriots (1965); Miami Dolphins (1966); Boston Patriots (1967)*
- * Offseason or practice squad member only

Coaching
- Kansas City Chiefs (1974) Receivers coach

Awards and highlights
- AFL champion (1962); Third-team All-American (1961)

Career AFL statistics
- Passing attempts: 186
- Passing completions: 90
- Completion percentage: 48.4%
- TD–INT: 5–6
- Passing yards: 1,251
- Passer rating: 65.9
- Stats at Pro Football Reference

Edward Adair Wilson (born August 14, 1940) is an American former professional football player who was a quarterback and punter in the American Football League (AFL). He played college football for the Arizona Wildcats and professionally for the Dallas Texans/Kansas City Chiefs and the Boston Patriots. He coached for Arizona, Army, Cornell, Duke, Florida State, Georgia Tech, Wake Forest, and the Kansas City Chiefs.

== See also ==
- List of NCAA major college football yearly passing leaders
- List of American Football League players
