= Bobby Thompson (defensive back) =

American gridiron football player (1939–2014)

No. 24, 27, 21
- Position: Cornerback

Personal information
- Born: March 30, 1939; Minden, Louisiana, U.S.
- Died: March 11, 2014 (aged 74); Los Angeles, California, U.S.
- Listed height: 5 ft 11 in (1.80 m)
- Listed weight: 188 lb (85 kg)

Career information
- High school: Centennial (Compton, California)
- College: Compton Junior College (1958–1959); Arizona (1960–1961)
- NFL draft: 1962: 3rd round, 38th overall pick
- AFL draft: 1962: 12th round, 91st overall pick

Career history
- Montreal Alouettes (1962–1963); Detroit Lions (1964–1968); New Orleans Saints (1969); Dallas Cowboys (1970)*; Montreal Alouettes (1970–1971)
- * Offseason or practice squad member only

Awards and highlights
- Grey Cup champion (1970)

Career NFL statistics
- Interceptions: 10
- Fumble recoveries: 4
- Punt/Kick return yards: 694
- Stats at Pro Football Reference

Robert Lee Thompson (March 30, 1939 – March 11, 2014) was an American professional football player who played for the Montreal Alouettes, Detroit Lions and New Orleans Saints. He won the Grey Cup with Montreal in 1970. He previously played college football at University of Arizona.
