= Hermon, Los Angeles =

Hermon
- Neighborhood of Los Angeles
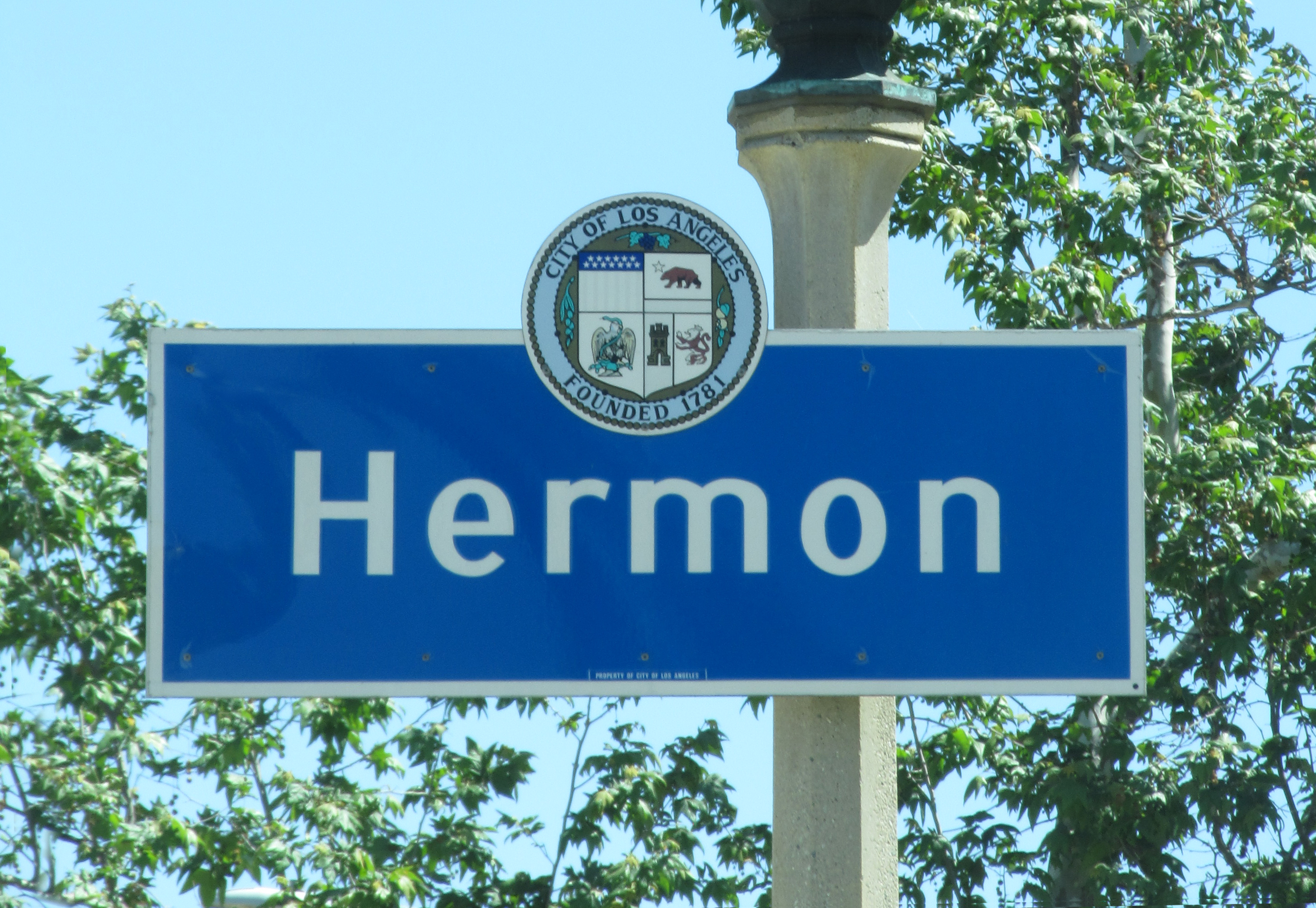
- Hermon Neighborhood Sign located on Via Marisol at the 110 Freeway exit

- Location within Central Los Angeles
- Coordinates: 34.103906°N 118.185077°W
- Country: United States
- State: California
- County: Los Angeles
- City: Los Angeles
- Time zone: UTC-8 (PST)
  - Summer (DST): UTC-7 (PDT)

Hermon is a neighborhood in the northeast area of Los Angeles. It was established in 1903 and became part of Los Angeles in 1912.

== History ==
Hermon was established in 1903, when the Free Methodist church group obtained the isolated valley from owner Ralph Rogers to establish a school. Rogers provided an additional one hundred building lots to sell for operating funds. The community of Hermon was organized around the campus, named after the biblical Mount Hermon, and largely populated by families whose children attended the school. The school grew to become Los Angeles Pacific College in 1934, then closed in 1965 after the buildings were found to be too damaged to bring up to code. Up until 2003, the school campus held a private college prep high school, Pacific Christian. It is now owned by Bethesda Christian University and has been leased to Los Angeles College Prep Academy (LACPA) (formerly L.A. International Charter High School).

Hermon was annexed into Los Angeles in 1912. Better links were established between Hermon and the rest of Los Angeles with the construction of a bridge across the Arroyo Seco at Avenue 60 in 1926, the Monterey Road pass to the south in 1930, and the Hermon Avenue bridge (renamed Via Marisol by the late Los Angeles City Council member Art Snyder in 1978 to honor his young daughter, Erin Marisol Snyder) to the west in 1939.

In the years since its inception, the neighborhood has grown from 100 small lots into a community of approximately 3,500 residents. The Hermon Neighborhood Council was certified in May 2017 as the 97th and smallest Los Angeles neighborhood advisory board.

== Geography ==
Hermon is situated in a half square-mile valley bordered by the Arroyo Seco and the 110 freeway to the west, Rose Hills to the south, and South Pasadena to the north and Monterey Hills to the east. When the "Hermon" sign at the Arroyo Seco Freeway exit was originally installed, it was mistakenly spelled "Herman".

== Education ==
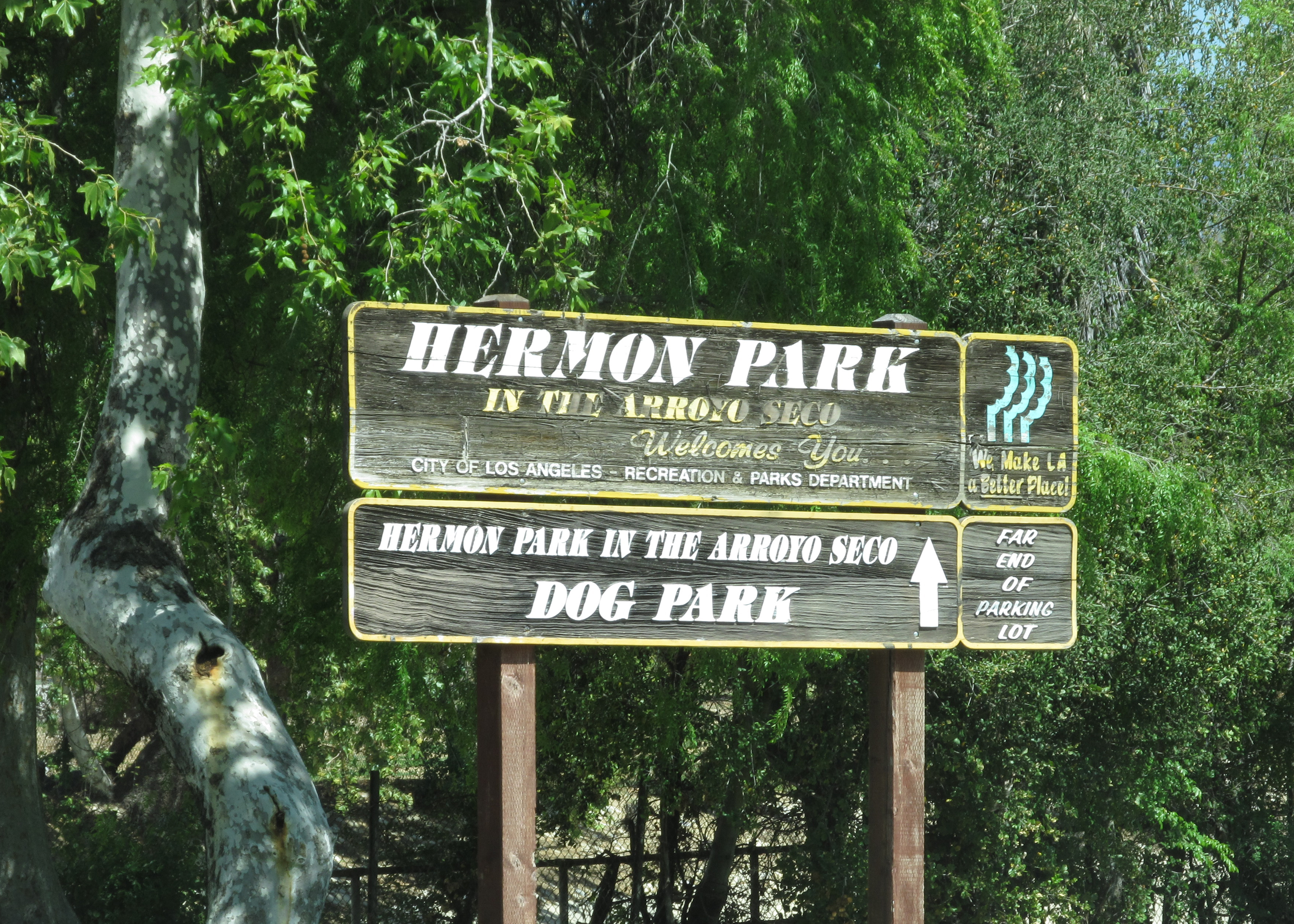
Signage for both Hermon Park and the Dog Park

The Los Angeles Unified School District operates district schools.

- Bushnell Way Elementary School - 5507 Bushnell Way, Los Angeles, CA 90042. Bushnell Way Elementary School was called the "American School" prior to Hermon's annexation by the City of Los Angeles in 1912.
- Los Angeles College Prep Academy - The school occupies the former campus of Pacific Christian on the Hill. That former school opened in 1904 as Los Angeles (Free Methodist) Seminary and had grades 1 through 12 with a total of 70 students. In 1911 the Seminary added community college courses making it what is believed to be the first junior college in California. In 1934 it became Los Angeles Pacific College, a four-year university. Los Angeles Pacific College merged with Azusa College to become the current Azusa Pacific University in the mid-1960s.

== Events ==
- Annual Holiday Tree Lighting - Wheeling Way and Monterey Road.

== Parks and recreation ==
- Hermon Park - 5566 Via Marisol, Los Angeles, CA 90042. The park has barbecue pits, children's play area, picnic tables, and lighted tennis courts.
- Hermon Dog Park - 5566 Via Marisol, Los Angeles, CA 90042.
