= Joe Zuger =

American football player (1940–2024)

Profile
- Positions: Punter, Quarterback

Personal information
- Born: February 25, 1940; Homestead, Pennsylvania, U.S.
- Died: November 24, 2024 (aged 84); Hamilton, Ontario, Canada

Career information
- College: Arizona State University
- NFL draft: 1962: 18th round, 248th overall pick

Career history
- 1962–1971: Hamilton Tiger-Cats

Awards and highlights
- 3× Grey Cup champion (1963, 65, 67); Grey Cup Most Valuable Player (1967)

Joseph Zuger (February 25, 1940 – November 24, 2024) was an American professional football player who spent his entire career with the Hamilton Tiger-Cats of the Canadian Football League (CFL). He played college football for the Arizona State Sun Devils and was selected by the Detroit Lions in the 18th round of the 1962 NFL draft.

== College career ==
Zuger attended Arizona State University, between 1959 and 1961, where he excelled on offence, defence and as a punter. As quarterback, he compiled a 24–7 record in three years as a starter. He also played defensive back and punter. During his senior season in 1961, Zuger completed 67-of-133 passes (50.4%) for 879 yards and eight touchdowns, and led the team and ranked among the nationally with 10 interceptions (the third best single-season mark in ASU history), and had a 42.1-yard punting average. He has been inducted into the Arizona State University Sports Hall of Fame.

== CFL playing career ==
Drafted by the NFL's Detroit Lions in the 18th round (248th overall) Zuger came to Canada for what would be a ten-year career (1962 to 1971) with the Hamilton Tiger-Cats. In 1962, his rookie season, Zuger shared quarterback duties with Frank Cosentino, as the #1 starter, Bernie Faloney, was injured. Zuger turned heads immediately when in his first game as the starting quarterback he threw for a team record 572 passing yards and a league record eight touchdown passes in a 67–21 win over the Saskatchewan Roughriders. That year, Zuger completed 55.7% of his 113 passes for 1,070 yards and had a 15-6 touchdown-to-interception ratio. In addition, he intercepted four passes as a defensive back and was the regular punter with a 43.3 yard average. With Faloney back in 1963, Zuger became a full-time defensive back and had five interceptions. Injuries limited Zuger to just eight games in 1964, and in 1965, with the trading of Faloney to Montreal, Zuger moved back to the quarterback position, sharing duties with Cosentino again, as well as in 1966, before taking over as the sole #1 quarterback in 1967 and leading Hamilton to victory in the 55th Grey Cup game against Saskatchewan, named as the Grey Cup Most Valuable Player. That year and 1968 were Zuger's best as quarterback, both with over 300 pass attempts and passing for 2,771 and 2,616 yards, respectively. Injuries cut Zuger back to 11 games in 1969 and nine in 1970. In his final season, in 1971, Zuger returned to play all 14 games, completing 48.6% of his 265 passes for 1,632 yards, but he had a bad 8-19 touchdown-to-interception ratio.

Zuger, as a punter recorded a league record 45.5-yard punting average over his career. Three times, he averaged over 48 yards-per-punt over a season and had punts of over 80 yards at least four times, including one of 85 yards in 1968.

He played in five Grey Cup games, winning three (1963, 1965, 1967).

== Post-playing CFL career ==
Zuger would later serve in Hamilton's front office. In 1981, he was appointed General Manager, a position he served for over a decade.

Zuger died in Hamilton on November 24, 2024, at the age of 84.
