= Los Angeles Pacific College =

American defunct liberal arts college

Coordinates: 34.062259°N 118.294966°W

Los Angeles Pacific College was a four-year, liberal-arts college in the Hermon neighborhood of Hispanic East Los Angeles, California.

The school was founded in 1903 to teach children and youth in grades one to twelve, by a group of laymen and staff of the Free Methodist Church, an Arminian Holiness sect. The campus also hosted a small all-women's (junior) college from 1911 to 1960. The college failed in 1965.

== History ==
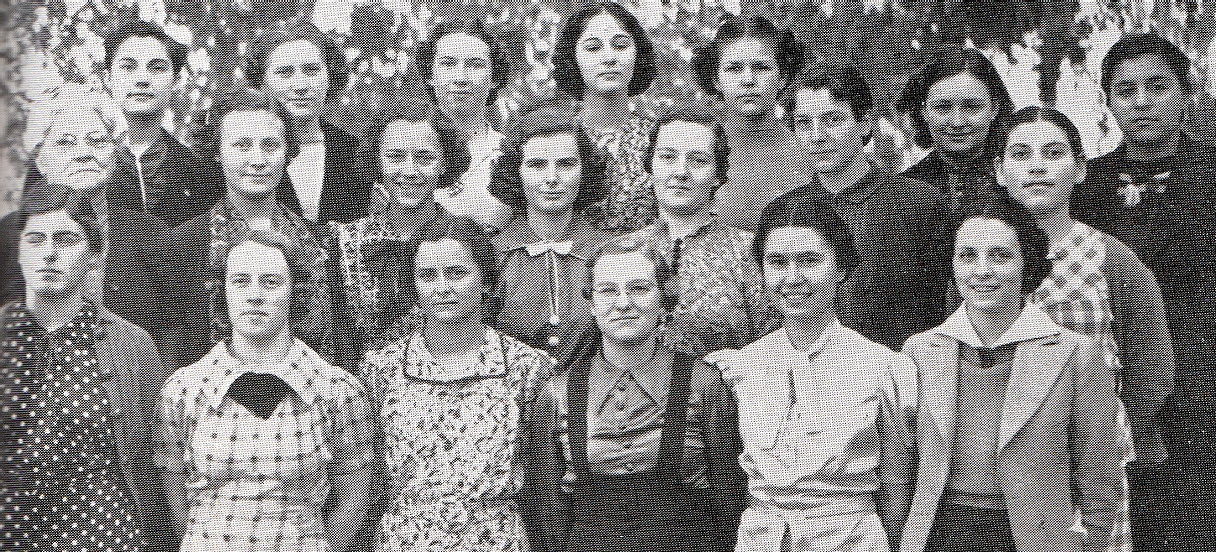
Adult students of LAPC, 1920

The founders of the school were the first developers of the urban community of Hermon in the city of Los Angeles, when it was still rural and tucked in the hills. Initially called Los Angeles Free Methodist Seminary, it was not a seminary for the education of ministers, but a school where children of the community could be taught in a Christian atmosphere.

The seminary (grades 1–12) opened in the fall of 1904 with 70 students. In 1911, the seminary added a junior college for women, the first in the state of California. As the small community of Hermon grew, a four-year college course was added in 1934 and the school came to be called Los Angeles Pacific College (LAPC). Part of the Free Methodist denomination, it taught the Free-Will System of religion.

In 1960, men were admitted; in 1961, an instructor created a football team for all male students regardless of ability, which practiced in public parks.

Following a major Chicago school fire in 1958, the city of Los Angeles' Department of Building and Safety began inspecting schools. Many of LAPC's aging bungalows were not up to code, so the Free Methodist Church sold off the assets. Official copies of student records, transcripts, and diplomas would all be lost when the college was bulldozed in 1965.

The corner lot became a liquor store, catty corner from the hill, which became Pacific Christian High School, carrying on the legacy of the original founders' concept of Christian classes in the Hermon neighborhood. A remnant of that lasted until 2004, when the high school closed due to financial failure. The site is now Los Angeles College Prep Academy, a secular public school, located on 5732 Ebey Avenue.

== Notable alumni ==
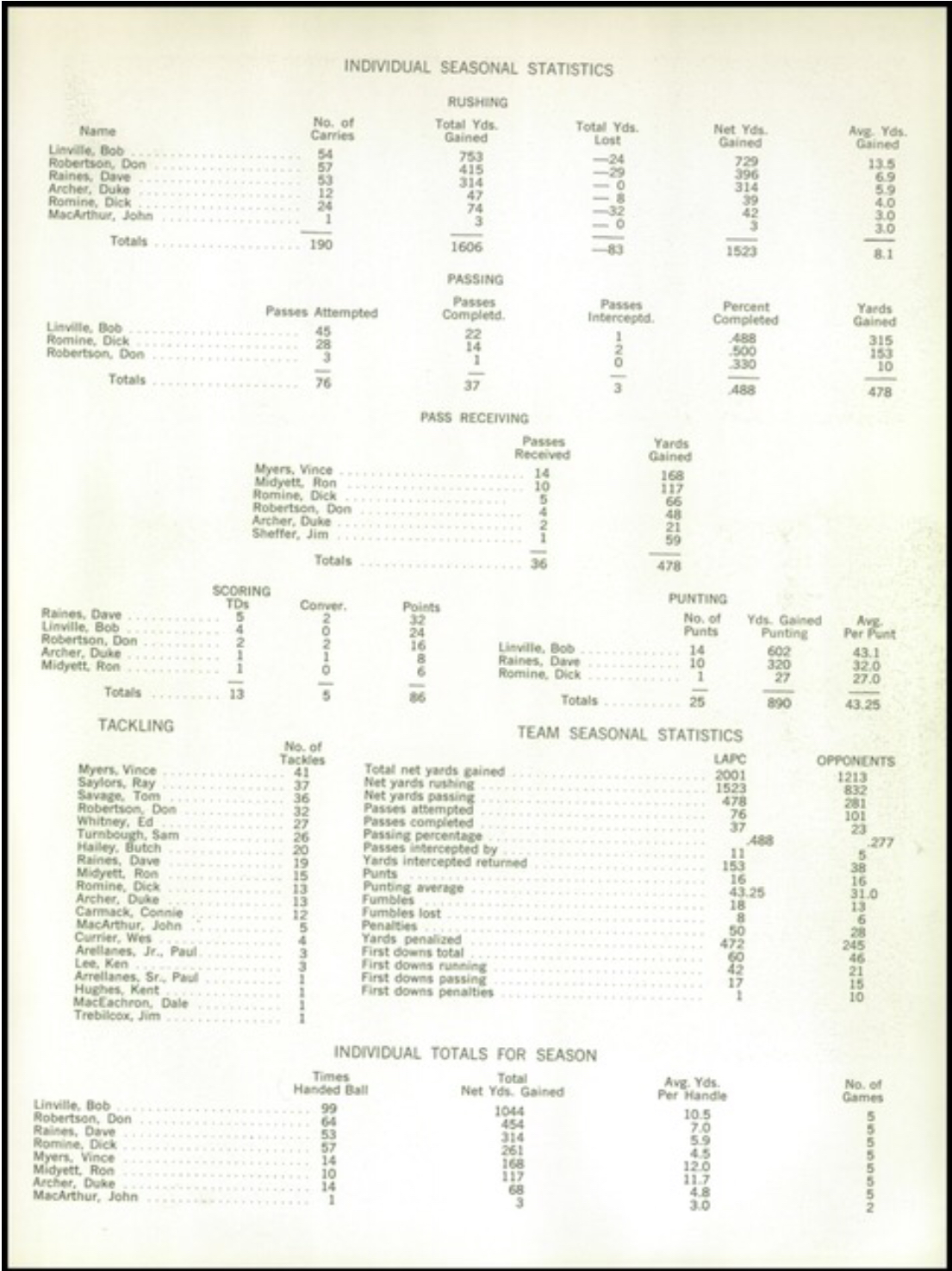
Los Angeles Pacific College's football roster and statistics in the 1962 yearbook

- Harry Bidwell Ansted (1893–1955), United States Army officer, pastor and educator, first president of Seoul National University, instructor of women at LAPC
- Arleta Richardson (1923–2004), a Christian children's author and teacher of women, librarian at LAPC
- Paul Cameron (born 1939), psychologist, founder of the Family Research Institute; graduated from LAPC in 1961, in the first class with males
- Jack MacArthur (1914–2005), pastor of Cavalry Bible Church and founder of Voice of Cavalry radio ministries; was given an honorary doctorate of literature by LAPC in 1961
- John MacArthur (born 1939), son of Jack Macarthur (above), pastor of Grace Community Church in Sun Valley, California; graduated from LAPC in 1962
