= 1961 C. W. Post Pioneers football team =

American college football season

1961 C. W. Post Pioneers football
- Conference: Independent
- Record: 6–3
- Head coach: Roy Ilowit (5th season)
- MVP: Phil Siino

1961 Eastern college football independents records
	Conf.			Overall
Team	W	L	T	W		L		T
Middlebury		–		5	–	1	–	1
Villanova		–		8	–	2	–	0
Southern Connecticut State		–		7	–	2	–	0
Alfred		–		6	–	2	–	0
Montclair State		–		6	–	2	–	0
Delaware Valley		–		6	–	2	–	0
No. 17 Penn State		–		8	–	3	–	0
No. 14 Syracuse		–		8	–	3	–	0
Trinity (CT)		–		5	–	2	–	1
Holy Cross		–		7	–	3	–	0
C. W. Post		–		6	–	3	–	0
Army		–		6	–	4	–	0
Merchant Marine		–		6	–	4	–	0
Tufts		–		5	–	3	–	0
Rochester		–		5	–	3	–	0
Hamilton		–		4	–	3	–	0
Cortland State		–		4	–	3	–	0
American International		–		5	–	4	–	0
Colgate		–		5	–	4	–	0
Northeastern		–		4	–	4	–	0
Coast Guard		–		4	–	4	–	0
Ithaca		–		4	–	4	–	0
Boston University		–		4	–	5	–	0
Buffalo		–		4	–	5	–	0
Bridgeport		–		4	–	5	–	0
Norwich		–		3	–	4	–	1
Worcester Tech		–		3	–	4	–	0
Boston College		–		4	–	6	–	0
Union (NY)		–		3	–	5	–	0
Pittsburgh		–		3	–	7	–	0
Nichols		–		2	–	3	–	0
Trenton State		–		1	–	6	–	0
King's (PA)		–		1	–	8	–	0
Springfield		–		0	–	7	–	1
Brockport		–		0	–	7	–	0
RPI		–		0	–	7	–	0
Hobart		–		0	–	8	–	0
Rankings from AP Poll

The 1961 C. W. Post Pioneers football team was an American football team that represented C. W. Post College (now known as LIU Post) of Brookville, New York, as an independent during the 1961 college football season. In their fifth season under head coach Roy Ilowit, the Pioneers compiled a 6–3 record and outscored opponents by a total of 133 to 104.

Halfback Phil Siino led the team in rushing (437 yards) and total offense (503 yards) and won the award as the team's outstanding player.

== Schedule ==
Date	Opponent	Site	Result	Attendance	Source
September 23	Moravian	Brookville, NY	W 21–19	3,000	
September 30	Cortland	Greenvale, NY	W 13–7	3,000	
October 7	at Trenton State	Ewing NJ	W 13–0	3,000	
October 14	Swarthmore	Brookville, NY	L 13–14	3,000	
October 28	Ithaca	Brookville, NY	W 26–20	3,000	
November 4	at Bridgeport	Bridgeport, CT	L 6–7	5,000	
November 11	at Montclair State	Sprague Field; Montclair, NJ	W 19–13	3,000	
November 18	King's (PA)		W 16–0	3,500	
November 23	at Hofstra	Hofstra College Stadium; Hempstead, NY	L 6–24	7,700	

== Statistics ==
The Pioneers gained 2,110 of total offense (234.4 yards per game), consisting of 1,537 rushing yards (170.8 yards per game) and 573 passing yards (63.7 yards per game). On defense, they gave up 1,483 yards (164.8 yards per game) with 781 rushing yards (86.8 yards per game) and 702 passing yards (78.0 yards per game).

The team's rushing leaders were halfback Phil Siino (437 yards, 103 carries, 4.2 yards per carry) and halfback Brian Smith (406 yards, 72 carries, 5.6 yards per carry). Siino and Smith also led the team in total offense with 503 and 408 yards, respectively. Siino won the Iggie Walczak Memorial Award as the team's outstanding player.

The team's passing leaders were quarterbacks Vin Salamone (21-for-57, 303 yards, one touchdown, 10 interceptions) and Andy Brennan (18-for-46, 194 yards, five touchdowns, seven interceptions).

The receiving leaders were Marco Bennedetto (12 receptions, 232 yards, two touchdowns) and halfback Brian Smith (12 receptions, 184 yards, three touchdowns).

The leading scorers were Brian Smith (60 points, 10 touchdowns) and Marco Bennedetti (two touchdowns and 8-for-14 on extra points kicks).

Junior halfback/quarterback Frank Scicchitano did the punting, totaling 850 yards on 27 punts for an average of 31.5 yards per punt. Scicchitano was five-feet, six inches tall and weighed 160 pounds.
