= 1961 Cortland State Red Dragons football team =

American college football season

1961 Cortland Red Dragons football
- Conference: Independent
- Record: 4–3
- Head coach: Carl A. Davis (30th season)

1961 Eastern college football independents records
	Conf.			Overall
Team	W	L	T	W		L		T
Middlebury		–		5	–	1	–	1
Villanova		–		8	–	2	–	0
Southern Connecticut State		–		7	–	2	–	0
Alfred		–		6	–	2	–	0
Montclair State		–		6	–	2	–	0
Delaware Valley		–		6	–	2	–	0
No. 17 Penn State		–		8	–	3	–	0
No. 14 Syracuse		–		8	–	3	–	0
Trinity (CT)		–		5	–	2	–	1
Holy Cross		–		7	–	3	–	0
C. W. Post		–		6	–	3	–	0
Army		–		6	–	4	–	0
Merchant Marine		–		6	–	4	–	0
Tufts		–		5	–	3	–	0
Rochester		–		5	–	3	–	0
Hamilton		–		4	–	3	–	0
Cortland State		–		4	–	3	–	0
American International		–		5	–	4	–	0
Colgate		–		5	–	4	–	0
Northeastern		–		4	–	4	–	0
Coast Guard		–		4	–	4	–	0
Ithaca		–		4	–	4	–	0
Boston University		–		4	–	5	–	0
Buffalo		–		4	–	5	–	0
Bridgeport		–		4	–	5	–	0
Norwich		–		3	–	4	–	1
Worcester Tech		–		3	–	4	–	0
Boston College		–		4	–	6	–	0
Union (NY)		–		3	–	5	–	0
Pittsburgh		–		3	–	7	–	0
Nichols		–		2	–	3	–	0
Trenton State		–		1	–	6	–	0
King's (PA)		–		1	–	8	–	0
Springfield		–		0	–	7	–	1
Brockport		–		0	–	7	–	0
RPI		–		0	–	7	–	0
Hobart		–		0	–	8	–	0
Rankings from AP Poll

The 1961 Cortland State Red Dragons football team was an American football team that represented Cortland State Teachers College (now known as State University of New York at Cortland as an independent during the 1961 college football season. In their 30th year under head coach Carl A. Davis, the Red Dragons compiled a 4–3 record and outscored opponents by a total of 209 to 118. Quarterback Michael "Mickey" Nugent led the team with 552 yards of total offense.

== Schedule ==
Date	Opponent	Site	Result	Attendance	Source
September 23	at Alfred	Alfred, NY	W 13–6	4,000	
September 30	C. W. Post	Greenvale, NY	L 7–13	3,000	
October 7	Bloomsburg	Cortland, NY	W 16–8	3,000	
October 14	at Ithaca	South Hill Field; Ithaca, NY (Cortaca Jug)	L 0–34	1,000–2,000	
October 21	King's (PA)	Cortland, NY	W 27–8	2,000	
October 28	Brockport^{†}	Cortland, NY	W 39–0	6,000	
November 4	at East Stroudsburg	East Stroudsburg, PA	L 0–24	1,500	
^{†}Homecoming

== Statistics ==
The Red Dragons tallied 1,756 yards of total offense (250.9 yards per game), consisting of 9929 rushing yards (131.4 yards per game) and 836 passing yards (119.4 yards per game). On defense, they gave up 1,724 yards by opponents (247.7 yards per game), including 1,018 rushing yards (145.4 yards per game) and 706 passing yards (100.9 yards per game).

The team's passing leaders were junior quarterback Michael "Mickey" Nugent (41 of 87 for 573 yards, five touchdowns and six interceptions) and quarterback George Tucci (21 of 50 for 261 yards with two touchdowns and nine interceptions). Nugent lost 21 rushing yards but still led the team with 552 yards of total offense.

The team's rushing leaders were junior fullback John O'Connor (245 yards, 61 carries) and junior halfback Bill Yelverton (194 yards, 47 carries).

The team's receiving leaders were junior end Jerry Hill (11 receptions, 222 yards) and senior Bob Hudak (15 receptions, 203 yards).

The leading scorers were end Robert Hudak (four touchdowns, 24 points) and halfback Bill Yelverton (two touchdowns, 12 points).

Sophomore guard Dominick Copozzi handled the punting, having 29 punts for 1,082 yards, an average of 37.3 yards per punt. He also kicked two field goals and converted one of two extra points conversions.
