= 1961 Delaware Valley Aggies football team =

American college football season

1961 Delaware Valley Aggies football
- Conference: Independent
- Record: 6–2
- Head coach: Robert D. Chiodi (3rd season)
- Home stadium: Alumni Field

1961 Eastern college football independents records
	Conf.			Overall
Team	W	L	T	W		L		T
Middlebury		–		5	–	1	–	1
Villanova		–		8	–	2	–	0
Southern Connecticut State		–		7	–	2	–	0
Alfred		–		6	–	2	–	0
Montclair State		–		6	–	2	–	0
Delaware Valley		–		6	–	2	–	0
No. 17 Penn State		–		8	–	3	–	0
No. 14 Syracuse		–		8	–	3	–	0
Trinity (CT)		–		5	–	2	–	1
Holy Cross		–		7	–	3	–	0
C. W. Post		–		6	–	3	–	0
Army		–		6	–	4	–	0
Merchant Marine		–		6	–	4	–	0
Tufts		–		5	–	3	–	0
Rochester		–		5	–	3	–	0
Hamilton		–		4	–	3	–	0
Cortland State		–		4	–	3	–	0
American International		–		5	–	4	–	0
Colgate		–		5	–	4	–	0
Northeastern		–		4	–	4	–	0
Coast Guard		–		4	–	4	–	0
Ithaca		–		4	–	4	–	0
Boston University		–		4	–	5	–	0
Buffalo		–		4	–	5	–	0
Bridgeport		–		4	–	5	–	0
Norwich		–		3	–	4	–	1
Worcester Tech		–		3	–	4	–	0
Boston College		–		4	–	6	–	0
Union (NY)		–		3	–	5	–	0
Pittsburgh		–		3	–	7	–	0
Nichols		–		2	–	3	–	0
Trenton State		–		1	–	6	–	0
King's (PA)		–		1	–	8	–	0
Springfield		–		0	–	7	–	1
Brockport		–		0	–	7	–	0
RPI		–		0	–	7	–	0
Hobart		–		0	–	8	–	0
Rankings from AP Poll

The 1961 Delaware Valley Aggies football team was an American football team that represented Delaware Valley College (now known as Delaware Valley University) of Doylestown, Pennsylvania, as an independent during the 1961 college football season. In their third season under head coach Robert D. Chiodi, the Aggies compiled a 6–2 record.

== Schedule ==
Date	Opponent	Site	Result	Attendance	Source
September 23	at Montclair State	Sprague Field; Montclair, NJ	L 13–40		
September 30	Gallaudet	Alumni Field; Doylestown, PA	W 27–6	4,000	
October 7	Lycoming	Williamsport, PA	W 7–6		
October 14	Kutztown^{†}	Alumni Field; Doylestown, PA	W 12–6	1,500	
October 21	at Grove City	Grove City, PA	W 6–0		
October 28	Susquehanna	Alumni Field; Doylestown, PA	L 0–30	2,200	
November 4	at King's (PA)	Kingston HS field; Kingston, PA	W 16–12	1,200	
November 11	Cheyney	Alumni Field; Doylestown, PA	W 27–0	2,500	
^{†}Homecoming
