= 1961 Montclair State Indians football team =

American college football season

1961 Montclair State Indians football
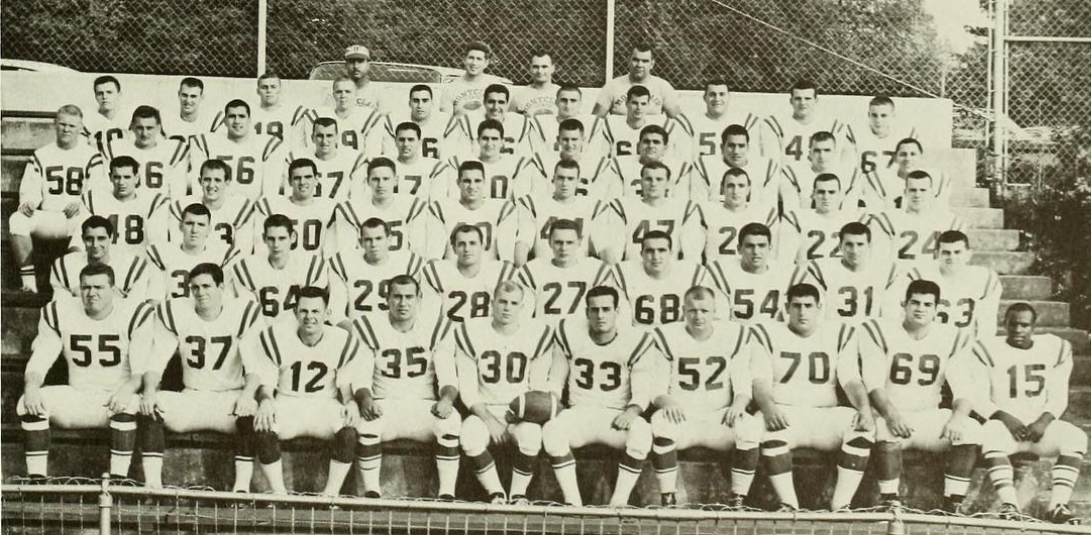
- Team portrait from La Camapana (1962)
- Conference: Independent
- Record: 6–2
- Head coach: Jerry Edwards (2nd season)
- Home stadium: Sprague Field

1961 Eastern college football independents records
	Conf.			Overall
Team	W	L	T	W		L		T
Middlebury		–		5	–	1	–	1
Villanova		–		8	–	2	–	0
Southern Connecticut State		–		7	–	2	–	0
Alfred		–		6	–	2	–	0
Montclair State		–		6	–	2	–	0
Delaware Valley		–		6	–	2	–	0
No. 17 Penn State		–		8	–	3	–	0
No. 14 Syracuse		–		8	–	3	–	0
Trinity (CT)		–		5	–	2	–	1
Holy Cross		–		7	–	3	–	0
C. W. Post		–		6	–	3	–	0
Army		–		6	–	4	–	0
Merchant Marine		–		6	–	4	–	0
Tufts		–		5	–	3	–	0
Rochester		–		5	–	3	–	0
Hamilton		–		4	–	3	–	0
Cortland State		–		4	–	3	–	0
American International		–		5	–	4	–	0
Colgate		–		5	–	4	–	0
Northeastern		–		4	–	4	–	0
Coast Guard		–		4	–	4	–	0
Ithaca		–		4	–	4	–	0
Boston University		–		4	–	5	–	0
Buffalo		–		4	–	5	–	0
Bridgeport		–		4	–	5	–	0
Norwich		–		3	–	4	–	1
Worcester Tech		–		3	–	4	–	0
Boston College		–		4	–	6	–	0
Union (NY)		–		3	–	5	–	0
Pittsburgh		–		3	–	7	–	0
Nichols		–		2	–	3	–	0
Trenton State		–		1	–	6	–	0
King's (PA)		–		1	–	8	–	0
Springfield		–		0	–	7	–	1
Brockport		–		0	–	7	–	0
RPI		–		0	–	7	–	0
Hobart		–		0	–	8	–	0
Rankings from AP Poll

The 1961 Montclair State Indians football team was an American football team that represented Monclair State College (now known as Montclair State University) as an independent during the 1961 college football season. In their second year under head coach Jerry Edwards, the Indians compiled a 6–2 record and outscored opponents by a total of 181 to 95. After going 8–0 in 1960, the Indians extended the winning streak to 14 games by winning the first six games of the 1961 season. They then lost the final two games of the season.

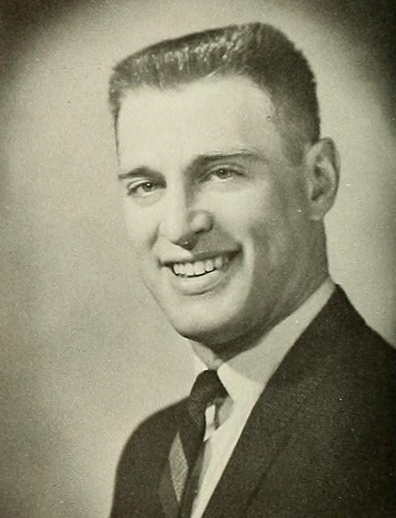
George Jeck

Players included quarterback George Jeck, George Jenkins, Roger Rubinetti, Bob Cannon, Dom Dee, Pete Carmichael, Ken Trimmer, and Jim Francini.

The team played two home games at Sprague Field in Montclair, New Jersey, and two others at Clifton Stadium in Clifton, New Jersey.

== Schedule ==
Date	Opponent	Site	Result	Attendance	Source
September 23	Delaware Valley	Sprague Field; Montclair, NJ	W 40–13		
September 30	at Cheyney	Cheyney, PA	W 48–0		
October 7	Central Connecticut	Clifton Stadium; Clifton, NJ	W 22–14	4,000	
October 14	at Trenton State	Trenton, NJ	W 15–6		
October 21	at Gallaudet	Hughes Field; Washington, DC	W 9–6		
October 28	Kutztown^{†}	Clifton Stadium; Clifton, NJ	W 20–6		
November 4	at Millersville	Millersville, PA	L 14–31	2,000	
November 11	C. W. Post	Sprague Field; Montclair, NJ	L 13–19	3,000	
^{†}Homecoming
