= 1961 RPI Engineers football team =

American college football season

1961 RPI Engineers football
- Conference: Independent
- Record: 0–7
- Head coach: Ed Hoffman (4th season)
- Home stadium: '86 Field

1961 Eastern college football independents records
	Conf.			Overall
Team	W	L	T	W		L		T
Middlebury		–		5	–	1	–	1
Villanova		–		8	–	2	–	0
Southern Connecticut State		–		7	–	2	–	0
Alfred		–		6	–	2	–	0
Montclair State		–		6	–	2	–	0
Delaware Valley		–		6	–	2	–	0
No. 17 Penn State		–		8	–	3	–	0
No. 14 Syracuse		–		8	–	3	–	0
Trinity (CT)		–		5	–	2	–	1
Holy Cross		–		7	–	3	–	0
C. W. Post		–		6	–	3	–	0
Army		–		6	–	4	–	0
Merchant Marine		–		6	–	4	–	0
Tufts		–		5	–	3	–	0
Rochester		–		5	–	3	–	0
Hamilton		–		4	–	3	–	0
Cortland State		–		4	–	3	–	0
American International		–		5	–	4	–	0
Colgate		–		5	–	4	–	0
Northeastern		–		4	–	4	–	0
Coast Guard		–		4	–	4	–	0
Ithaca		–		4	–	4	–	0
Boston University		–		4	–	5	–	0
Buffalo		–		4	–	5	–	0
Bridgeport		–		4	–	5	–	0
Norwich		–		3	–	4	–	1
Worcester Tech		–		3	–	4	–	0
Boston College		–		4	–	6	–	0
Union (NY)		–		3	–	5	–	0
Pittsburgh		–		3	–	7	–	0
Nichols		–		2	–	3	–	0
Trenton State		–		1	–	6	–	0
King's (PA)		–		1	–	8	–	0
Springfield		–		0	–	7	–	1
Brockport		–		0	–	7	–	0
RPI		–		0	–	7	–	0
Hobart		–		0	–	8	–	0
Rankings from AP Poll

The 1961 RPI Engineers football team was an American football team that represented Rensselaer Polytechnic Institute (RPI) as an independent during the 1961 college football season. In their fourth year under head coach Ed Hoffman, the Engineers compiled a 0–7 record, suffered four shutouts, and were outscored by a total of 168 to 24.

The 1961 season was part of a 43-game winless streak. The streak began on October 24, 1959, with a 16–0 loss to Middlebury College and ended six years later on October 23, 1965, with a 28-14 victory over Middlebury. RPI managed only a single tie (20–20 with Nichols College in 1964) during that span.

The team's leaders on offense included quarterback Dick Lundgren, fullback Rod Quirk, halfback Hank Light, and end Ron Leasman.

The team played its home games at '86 Field (a gift from the school's Class of 1886) in Troy, New York. Admission for home games was $1 for adults and 50 cents for children under age 14.

== Schedule ==
Date	Opponent	Site	Result	Attendance	Source
September 30	at St. Lawrence	Canton, NY	L 0–26		
October 7	Hamilton	'86 Field; Troy, NY	L 10–22		
October 21	Union (NY)	'86 Field; Troy, NY	L 8–10	3,000	
October 28	Middlebury	'86 Field; Troy, NY	L 6–20	2,800	
November 4	at Worcester Tech	Worcester, MA	L 0–40		
November 11	Coast Guard	'86 Field; Troy, NY	L 0–13	1,000	
November 18	at Rochester	Fauver Stadium; Rochester, NY	L 0–37	2,600	
