= 1961 Tufts Jumbos football team =

American college football season

1961 Tufts Jumbos football
- Conference: Independent
- Record: 5–3
- Head coach: Harry Arlanson (8th season)
- Home stadium: Tufts Oval

1961 Eastern college football independents records
	Conf.			Overall
Team	W	L	T	W		L		T
Middlebury		–		5	–	1	–	1
Villanova		–		8	–	2	–	0
Southern Connecticut State		–		7	–	2	–	0
Alfred		–		6	–	2	–	0
Montclair State		–		6	–	2	–	0
Delaware Valley		–		6	–	2	–	0
No. 17 Penn State		–		8	–	3	–	0
No. 14 Syracuse		–		8	–	3	–	0
Trinity (CT)		–		5	–	2	–	1
Holy Cross		–		7	–	3	–	0
C. W. Post		–		6	–	3	–	0
Army		–		6	–	4	–	0
Merchant Marine		–		6	–	4	–	0
Tufts		–		5	–	3	–	0
Rochester		–		5	–	3	–	0
Hamilton		–		4	–	3	–	0
Cortland State		–		4	–	3	–	0
American International		–		5	–	4	–	0
Colgate		–		5	–	4	–	0
Northeastern		–		4	–	4	–	0
Coast Guard		–		4	–	4	–	0
Ithaca		–		4	–	4	–	0
Boston University		–		4	–	5	–	0
Buffalo		–		4	–	5	–	0
Bridgeport		–		4	–	5	–	0
Norwich		–		3	–	4	–	1
Worcester Tech		–		3	–	4	–	0
Boston College		–		4	–	6	–	0
Union (NY)		–		3	–	5	–	0
Pittsburgh		–		3	–	7	–	0
Nichols		–		2	–	3	–	0
Trenton State		–		1	–	6	–	0
King's (PA)		–		1	–	8	–	0
Springfield		–		0	–	7	–	1
Brockport		–		0	–	7	–	0
RPI		–		0	–	7	–	0
Hobart		–		0	–	8	–	0
Rankings from AP Poll

The 1961 Tufts Jumbos football team was an American football team that represented Tufts University as an independent during the 1961 college football season. In their eighth season under head coach Harry Arlanson, the Jumbos compiled a 5–3 record.

Junior fullback Ron Deveaux and tackle Dave Thompson were selected as first-team players on the 1961 UPI All-New England small college football team.

== Schedule ==
Date	Opponent	Site	Result	Attendance	Source
September 23	at Bates	Garcelon Field; Lewiston, ME	W 42–12		
September 30	Bowdoin	Tufts Oval; Medford, MA	W 18–0	6,000	
October 7	Colby	Tufts Oval; Medford, MA	W 16–14	5,500	
October 14	at Trinity (CT)	Trinity Field; Hartford, CT	L 6–14	2,000	
October 28	Williams	Tufts Oval; Meford, MA	W 14–0	5,500–5,700	
November 4	Amherst	Tufts Oval; Medford, MA	L 6–40	7,500–8,000	
November 11	at Lafayette	Fisher Field; Easton, PA	L 17–27		
November 18	Coast Guard	Tufts Oval; Medford, MA	W 22–8	5,500	
