= 1961 Southern Connecticut State Owls football team =

American college football season

1961 Southern Connecticut State Owls football
- Conference: Independent
- Record: 7–2
- Head coach: Jess Dow (14th season)

1961 Eastern college football independents records
	Conf.			Overall
Team	W	L	T	W		L		T
Middlebury		–		5	–	1	–	1
Villanova		–		8	–	2	–	0
Southern Connecticut State		–		7	–	2	–	0
Alfred		–		6	–	2	–	0
Montclair State		–		6	–	2	–	0
Delaware Valley		–		6	–	2	–	0
No. 17 Penn State		–		8	–	3	–	0
No. 14 Syracuse		–		8	–	3	–	0
Trinity (CT)		–		5	–	2	–	1
Holy Cross		–		7	–	3	–	0
C. W. Post		–		6	–	3	–	0
Army		–		6	–	4	–	0
Merchant Marine		–		6	–	4	–	0
Tufts		–		5	–	3	–	0
Rochester		–		5	–	3	–	0
Hamilton		–		4	–	3	–	0
Cortland State		–		4	–	3	–	0
American International		–		5	–	4	–	0
Colgate		–		5	–	4	–	0
Northeastern		–		4	–	4	–	0
Coast Guard		–		4	–	4	–	0
Ithaca		–		4	–	4	–	0
Boston University		–		4	–	5	–	0
Buffalo		–		4	–	5	–	0
Bridgeport		–		4	–	5	–	0
Norwich		–		3	–	4	–	1
Worcester Tech		–		3	–	4	–	0
Boston College		–		4	–	6	–	0
Union (NY)		–		3	–	5	–	0
Pittsburgh		–		3	–	7	–	0
Nichols		–		2	–	3	–	0
Trenton State		–		1	–	6	–	0
King's (PA)		–		1	–	8	–	0
Springfield		–		0	–	7	–	1
Brockport		–		0	–	7	–	0
RPI		–		0	–	7	–	0
Hobart		–		0	–	8	–	0
Rankings from AP Poll

The 1961 Southern Connecticut State Owls football team was an American football team that represented Southern Connecticut State College (now known as Southern Connecticut State University) as an independent during the 1961 college football season. In their 14th year under head coach Jess Dow, the Owls compiled a 7–2 record. In the UPI New England small college coaches poll, they were ranked fifth behind Amherst, Maine, Williams and Trinity.

Southern Connecticut tallied an average of 351.6 yards per game of total offense, including 220.2 yards rushing. On defense, they held opponents to 103.0 rushing yards per game.

Junior fullback Ralph "Horse" Ferrisi led all New England college players with 68 points scored. Ferrisi also led the team with 734 rushing yards and 734 yards of total offense. Raymond Ciarleglio and Joe Landino shared the quarterback position and tallied 366 and 365 passing yards, respectively.

Tackle Brian O'Connor was selected as a second-team player on the 1961 Associated Press All New England football team; he was the only Southern Connecticut player named to the team. Other key players included quarterback Ray Ciarleglio, center Genaro Germe, and guard Larry McHugh.

== Schedule ==
Date	Opponent	Site	Result	Attendance	Source
September 23	Bridgeport	New Haven, CT	W 13–8	4,000	
September 30	vs. Maryland State	Griffith Stadium; Washington, DC (Capital Classic)	L 6–7	10,000	
October 7	Geneva	Yale Bowl; New Haven, CT	W 60–0	4,500	
October 14	at Youngstown	Rayen Stadium; Youngstown, OH	L 8–28	4,000	
October 21	at Ithaca	South Hill Field; Ithaca, NY	W 21–0	2,000	
October 28	at Quonset NAS	Quonset, RI	W 41–12	500	
November 4	Central Connecticut State	New Haven, CT	W 34–3	1,000	
November 11	Northeastern	New Haven, CT	W 23–0	1,200–1,800	
November 18	American International	New Haven, CT	W 33–6	3,000–3,500	
