= 1961 Trinity Bantams football team =

American college football season

1961 Trinity Bantams football
- Conference: Independent
- Record: 5–2–1
- Head coach: Dan Jessee (27th season)
- Captain: K. C. Cromwell
- Home stadium: Trinity Field

1961 Eastern college football independents records
	Conf.			Overall
Team	W	L	T	W		L		T
Middlebury		–		5	–	1	–	1
Villanova		–		8	–	2	–	0
Southern Connecticut State		–		7	–	2	–	0
Alfred		–		6	–	2	–	0
Montclair State		–		6	–	2	–	0
Delaware Valley		–		6	–	2	–	0
No. 17 Penn State		–		8	–	3	–	0
No. 14 Syracuse		–		8	–	3	–	0
Trinity (CT)		–		5	–	2	–	1
Holy Cross		–		7	–	3	–	0
C. W. Post		–		6	–	3	–	0
Army		–		6	–	4	–	0
Merchant Marine		–		6	–	4	–	0
Tufts		–		5	–	3	–	0
Rochester		–		5	–	3	–	0
Hamilton		–		4	–	3	–	0
Cortland State		–		4	–	3	–	0
American International		–		5	–	4	–	0
Colgate		–		5	–	4	–	0
Northeastern		–		4	–	4	–	0
Coast Guard		–		4	–	4	–	0
Ithaca		–		4	–	4	–	0
Boston University		–		4	–	5	–	0
Buffalo		–		4	–	5	–	0
Bridgeport		–		4	–	5	–	0
Norwich		–		3	–	4	–	1
Worcester Tech		–		3	–	4	–	0
Boston College		–		4	–	6	–	0
Union (NY)		–		3	–	5	–	0
Pittsburgh		–		3	–	7	–	0
Nichols		–		2	–	3	–	0
Trenton State		–		1	–	6	–	0
King's (PA)		–		1	–	8	–	0
Springfield		–		0	–	7	–	1
Brockport		–		0	–	7	–	0
RPI		–		0	–	7	–	0
Hobart		–		0	–	8	–	0
Rankings from AP Poll

The 1961 Trinity Bantams football team was an American football team that represented Trinity College of Hartford, Connecticut, as an independent during the 1961 college football season. In their 27th season under head coach Dan Jessee, the Bantams compiled a 5–2–1 record and outscored opponents by a total of 147 to 98. The team played home games at Trinity Field in Hartford.

== Schedule ==
Date	Opponent	Site	Result	Attendance	Source
September 30	at Williams	Weston Field; Williamstown, MA	W 8–6	4,500	
October 7	St. Lawrence	Trinity Field; Hartford, CT	T 14–14		
October 14	Tufts	Trinity Field; Hartford, CT	W 14–6	2,000	
October 21	Colby	Trinity Field; Hartford, CT	W 23–16	> 4,000	
October 28	at Franklin & Marshall	Lancaster, PA	W 26–0		
November 4	at Coast Guard	Jones Field; New London, CT	L 12–20	3,500	
November 11	at Amherst	Pratt Field; Amherst, MA	L 8–22	6,300	
November 18	Wesleyan	Trinity Field; Hartford, CT (rivalry)	W 42–14	6,500	
