= 1961 Penn State Nittany Lions football team =

American college football season

1961 Penn State Nittany Lions football

Lambert Trophy winner Gator Bowl champion

Gator Bowl, W 30–15 vs. Georgia Tech
- Conference: Independent

Ranking
- Coaches: No. 19
- AP: No. 17
- Record: 8–3
- Head coach: Rip Engle (12th season)
- Captain: Jim Smith
- Home stadium: Beaver Stadium

1961 Eastern college football independents records
	Conf.			Overall
Team	W	L	T	W		L		T
Middlebury		–		5	–	1	–	1
Villanova		–		8	–	2	–	0
Southern Connecticut State		–		7	–	2	–	0
Alfred		–		6	–	2	–	0
Montclair State		–		6	–	2	–	0
Delaware Valley		–		6	–	2	–	0
No. 17 Penn State		–		8	–	3	–	0
No. 14 Syracuse		–		8	–	3	–	0
Trinity (CT)		–		5	–	2	–	1
Holy Cross		–		7	–	3	–	0
C. W. Post		–		6	–	3	–	0
Army		–		6	–	4	–	0
Merchant Marine		–		6	–	4	–	0
Tufts		–		5	–	3	–	0
Rochester		–		5	–	3	–	0
Hamilton		–		4	–	3	–	0
Cortland State		–		4	–	3	–	0
American International		–		5	–	4	–	0
Colgate		–		5	–	4	–	0
Northeastern		–		4	–	4	–	0
Coast Guard		–		4	–	4	–	0
Ithaca		–		4	–	4	–	0
Boston University		–		4	–	5	–	0
Buffalo		–		4	–	5	–	0
Bridgeport		–		4	–	5	–	0
Norwich		–		3	–	4	–	1
Worcester Tech		–		3	–	4	–	0
Boston College		–		4	–	6	–	0
Union (NY)		–		3	–	5	–	0
Pittsburgh		–		3	–	7	–	0
Nichols		–		2	–	3	–	0
Trenton State		–		1	–	6	–	0
King's (PA)		–		1	–	8	–	0
Springfield		–		0	–	7	–	1
Brockport		–		0	–	7	–	0
RPI		–		0	–	7	–	0
Hobart		–		0	–	8	–	0
Rankings from AP Poll

The 1961 Penn State Nittany Lions football team was an American football team that represented the Pennsylvania State University as an independent during the 1961 college football season. In their 12th year under head coach Rip Engle, the Nittany Lions compiled an 8–3 record, were ranked No. 17 in the final AP Poll, and outscored opponents by a total of 231 to 128. They concluded their season with a 30–15 victory over No. 13 Georgia Tech in the 1961 Gator Bowl. The Nittany Lions also received the Lambert Trophy as the best major college football team in the East.

The team was led on offense by quarterback Galen Hall (951 passing yards) and halfback Roger Kochman (666 rushing yards, 226 receiving yards, 54 points). In addition, Robert Mitinger, who played at end on both offense and defense, was selected as a first-team All-American by the American Football Coaches Association.

Joe Paterno was the team's backfield coach. The team played its home games at Beaver Stadium in University Park, Pennsylvania.

== Schedule ==
Date	Opponent	Rank	Site	TV	Result	Attendance	Source
September 23	Navy	No. 7	Beaver Stadium; University Park, PA		W 20–10	39,340	
September 29	at Miami (FL)	No. 8	Orange Bowl; Miami, FL		L 8–25	45,657	
October 6	at Boston University		Boston University Field; Boston, MA		W 32–0	10,150	
October 14	Army		Beaver Stadium; University Park, PA		L 6–10	44,120	
October 21	Syracuse		Beaver Stadium; University Park, PA (rivalry)		W 14–0	44,390	
October 28	California^{†}		Beaver Stadium; University Park, PA		W 33–16	30,265	
November 4	at Maryland		Byrd Stadium; College Park, MD (rivalry)		L 17–21	39,000	
November 11	at West Virginia		Mountaineer Field; Morgantown, WV (rivalry)		W 20–6	30,000	
November 18	Holy Cross		Beaver Stadium; University Park, PA		W 34–14	32,746	
November 25	at Pittsburgh		Pitt Stadium; Pittsburgh, PA (rivalry)		W 47–26	37,271	
December 30	vs. Georgia Tech		Gator Bowl Stadium; Jacksonville, FL (Gator Bowl)	CBS	W 30–15	50,202	
^{†}Homecoming; Rankings from AP Poll released prior to the game

== Statistics ==
Quarterback Galen Hall led the team in passing during the regular season, completing 50 of 97 passes (51.5%) for 951 yards, eight touchdowns, and five interceptions. In the Gator Bowl, Hall completed 12 of 22 passes for 175 yards and three touchdown and was selected as the game's most valuable player.

Halfback Roger Kochman led the team in rushing during the regular season with 666 yards on 129 carries for a 5.2-yard average. He added 76 yards on 13 carries in the Gator Bowl. Kochman also led the team in scoring with 54 points on nine touchdowns.

The team's other leading passers were backup quarterbacks Don Caum (13-for-39, 33.3%, 210 yards, one touchdown, two interceptions) and Pete Liske (17-for-32, 53.1%, 216 yards, two touchdowns, one interception).

The other leading rushers were Buddy Torris (490 yards, 105 carries, 4.7-yard average); Dave Hayes (253 yards, 66 carries, 3.8-yard average); Junior Powell (226 yards, 41 carries, 5.5-yard average); Al Gursky (174 yards, 60 carries, 2.9-yard average); and Don Jonas (149 yards, 31 carries, 4.8-yard average).

The receiving leaders were Junior Powell (332 yards, 15 receptions, 22.1-yard average); Jim Schwab (257 yards, 16 receptions, 16.1-yard average); and Roger Kochman (226 yards, 10 receptions, 22.6-yard average).

The leading scorer following Kochman were Buddy Torris (24 points, four touchdowns). Four players had 18 points each.

== Awards ==
The Nittany Lions received the Lambert Trophy as the best major college football team in the East.

Robert Mitinger, who played at end on both offense and defense, was selected as a first-team All-American by the American Football Coaches Association.

Mitinger, quarterback Galen Hall, and halfback Roger Kochman all received first-team honors on the Associated Press (AP) 1961 All-Eastern football team.

Four Penn State players received first-team honors on the AP All-Pennsylvania football team: Hall; Mitinger; Jim Smith at tackle; and Jay Huffman at center. Kochman and end Jim Schwab received second-team honors.
