= 1961 Buffalo Bulls football team =

American college football season

1961 Buffalo Bulls football
- Conference: Independent
- Record: 4–5
- Head coach: Dick Offenhamer (7th season)
- Captains: Bill Selent; Jack Hartman
- Home stadium: Rotary Field

1961 Eastern college football independents records
	Conf.			Overall
Team	W	L	T	W		L		T
Middlebury		–		5	–	1	–	1
Villanova		–		8	–	2	–	0
Southern Connecticut State		–		7	–	2	–	0
Alfred		–		6	–	2	–	0
Montclair State		–		6	–	2	–	0
Delaware Valley		–		6	–	2	–	0
No. 17 Penn State		–		8	–	3	–	0
No. 14 Syracuse		–		8	–	3	–	0
Trinity (CT)		–		5	–	2	–	1
Holy Cross		–		7	–	3	–	0
C. W. Post		–		6	–	3	–	0
Army		–		6	–	4	–	0
Merchant Marine		–		6	–	4	–	0
Tufts		–		5	–	3	–	0
Rochester		–		5	–	3	–	0
Hamilton		–		4	–	3	–	0
Cortland State		–		4	–	3	–	0
American International		–		5	–	4	–	0
Colgate		–		5	–	4	–	0
Northeastern		–		4	–	4	–	0
Coast Guard		–		4	–	4	–	0
Ithaca		–		4	–	4	–	0
Boston University		–		4	–	5	–	0
Buffalo		–		4	–	5	–	0
Bridgeport		–		4	–	5	–	0
Norwich		–		3	–	4	–	1
Worcester Tech		–		3	–	4	–	0
Boston College		–		4	–	6	–	0
Union (NY)		–		3	–	5	–	0
Pittsburgh		–		3	–	7	–	0
Nichols		–		2	–	3	–	0
Trenton State		–		1	–	6	–	0
King's (PA)		–		1	–	8	–	0
Springfield		–		0	–	7	–	1
Brockport		–		0	–	7	–	0
RPI		–		0	–	7	–	0
Hobart		–		0	–	8	–	0
Rankings from AP Poll

The 1961 Buffalo Bulls football team was an American football team that represented the University of Buffalo as an independent during the 1961 college football season. In their seventh season under head coach Dick Offenhamer, the Bulls compiled a 4–5 record and were outscored by a total of 163 to 136. The team played home games at Rotary Field in Buffalo, New York.

Quarterback John Stofa broke Buffalo's single-season record for total offense with 807 passing yards and 92 rushing yards for a total of 899 yards in total offense.

== Schedule ==
Date	Opponent	Site	Result	Attendance	Source
September 16	Gettysburg	Rotary Field; Buffalo, NY	W 14–6	10,800	
September 23	at Boston University	Boston University Field; Boston, MA	W 24–12	11,500	
September 30	at Delaware	Delaware Stadium; Newark, DE	L 12–36	6,200–7,000	
October 7	Holy Cross	Rotary Field; Buffalo, NY	L 8–20	9,327	
October 14	at Villanova	Villanova Stadium; Villanova, PA	L 6–28	10,000	
October 21	Temple^{†}	Rotary Field; Buffalo, NY	W 30–3	6,921–7,500	
October 28	at Connecticut	Memorial Stadium; Storrs, CT	W 30–7	7,087	
November 4	Bucknell	Rotary Field; Buffalo, NY	L 6–12	8,100–8,126	
November 11	VMI	Rotary Field; Buffalo, NY	L 6–39	6,093–6,300	
^{†}Homecoming

== Statistics ==
The Bulls gained 2,182 yards of total offense (242.4 yards per game) consisting of 994 rushing yards (110.4 yards per game) and 1,188 passing yards (132 yards per game). On defense, they gave up 2,111 yards (234.5 yards per game) by opponents, including 876 rushing yards (97.2 yards per game) and 1,236 passing yards (137.3 yards per game)

The team's passing leaders were sophomore quarterback John Stofa (64-for 127, 807 yards, 50.4 completion percentage, six touchdowns, five interceptions) and quarterback Eugene Querrie (21-for-64, 304 yards, 32.8 completion percentage, three touchdowns, nine interceptions). Stofa and Querrie also led the team in total offense with 899 and 327 yards, respectively. Stofa's 899 yards of total offense set a new Buffalo single-season record.

The team's rushing leaders were fullback Jack Valentic (252 yards, 59 carries, 4.3 yards per carry), halfback Bob Baker (185 yards, 53 carries, 3.2 yards per carry), Ron Clayback (133 yards, 42 carries, 3.2 yards per carry), and quarterback John Stofa (92 yards, 66 carries, 1.4 yards average).

Valentic was also the team's leading scorer with three touchdowns for 18 points.

The team's leading receivers were halfback Bob Baker (23 receptions for 233 yards, 0 touchdowns), end Bill Selent (12 receptions, 171 yards, 2 touchdowns), Clayback (12 receptions, 136 yards, 1 touchdown), John Cimba (11 receptions, 115 yards, 1 touchdown), and Dick Dickman (9 receptions, 130 yards, 1 touchdown).

End John Michno handled punting for the team, tallying 1,298 yards on 38 punts for an average of 34.2 yards per punt. John Cimba led the team in punt returns, gaining 89 yards on eight returns (11.1 yards per return).
