= 1961 Ithaca Bombers football team =

American college football season

1961 Ithaca Bombers football
- Conference: Independent
- Record: 4–4
- Head coach: Richard S. Lyon (4th season)
- Home stadium: South Hill Field

1961 Eastern college football independents records
	Conf.			Overall
Team	W	L	T	W		L		T
Middlebury		–		5	–	1	–	1
Villanova		–		8	–	2	–	0
Southern Connecticut State		–		7	–	2	–	0
Alfred		–		6	–	2	–	0
Montclair State		–		6	–	2	–	0
Delaware Valley		–		6	–	2	–	0
No. 17 Penn State		–		8	–	3	–	0
No. 14 Syracuse		–		8	–	3	–	0
Trinity (CT)		–		5	–	2	–	1
Holy Cross		–		7	–	3	–	0
C. W. Post		–		6	–	3	–	0
Army		–		6	–	4	–	0
Merchant Marine		–		6	–	4	–	0
Tufts		–		5	–	3	–	0
Rochester		–		5	–	3	–	0
Hamilton		–		4	–	3	–	0
Cortland State		–		4	–	3	–	0
American International		–		5	–	4	–	0
Colgate		–		5	–	4	–	0
Northeastern		–		4	–	4	–	0
Coast Guard		–		4	–	4	–	0
Ithaca		–		4	–	4	–	0
Boston University		–		4	–	5	–	0
Buffalo		–		4	–	5	–	0
Bridgeport		–		4	–	5	–	0
Norwich		–		3	–	4	–	1
Worcester Tech		–		3	–	4	–	0
Boston College		–		4	–	6	–	0
Union (NY)		–		3	–	5	–	0
Pittsburgh		–		3	–	7	–	0
Nichols		–		2	–	3	–	0
Trenton State		–		1	–	6	–	0
King's (PA)		–		1	–	8	–	0
Springfield		–		0	–	7	–	1
Brockport		–		0	–	7	–	0
RPI		–		0	–	7	–	0
Hobart		–		0	–	8	–	0
Rankings from AP Poll

The 1961 Ithaca Bombers football team was an American football team that represented Ithaca College as an independent during the 1961 college football season. In their fourth season under head coach Richard S. Lyon, the Bombers compiled a 4–4 record and outscored opponents by a total of 176 to 101.

The 1961 Bombers gained 2,263 yards of total offense (282.8 yards per game), consisting of 1,317 rushing yards (164 yards per game) and 1,107 passing yards (138.3 yards per game). On defense, they gave up 2,064 yards to their opponents (258 yards per game), including 1,114 rushing yards (148 yards per game) and 950 passing yards (118.7 yards per game). The team's individual statistical leaders included:

- Junior quarterback Larry Karas led the team in both passing (40-for-76 for 785 yards, five touchdowns and five interceptions) and total offense (784 yards). Karas's tally of 785 passing yards broke Ithaca's prior single-season record of 600 yards set one year earlier by Charles Brady
- Junior right halfback Billy Odell led the team in rushing (521 yards, 84 carries, 6.2 yards per carry), receiving (17 receptions, 382 yards), and scoring (10 touchdowns, 60 points). His 10 touchdowns broke Ithaca's single-season record of nine touchdowns set in 1958 by Dick Carmean.
- End Jack Yengo handled punting, tallying 24 punts for 977 yards, an average of 40.7 yards per punt.

The team played its home games at South Hill Field in Ithaca, New York.

== Schedule ==
Date	Opponent	Site	Result	Attendance	Source
September 23	West Chester	South Hill Field; Ithaca, NY	L 7–13	700–3,000	
September 30	at Hobart	Geneva, NY	W 19–6	1,600	
October 7	at King's (PA)	Kingston High Stadium; Wilkes-Barre, PA	W 40–13	1,700	
October 14	Cortland State	South Hill Field; Ithaca, NY (Cortaca Jug)	W 34–0	1,000–2,000	
October 21	Southern Connecticut State	South Hill Field; Ithaca, NY	L 0–21	1,000–2,000	
October 28	at C. W. Post	Brookville, NY	L 20–26	3,000	
November 4	Alfred	South Hill Field; Ithaca, NY	L 7–14	600	
November 11	at Brockport	Brockport, NY	W 49–8	1,100	
