= 1961 American International Yellow Jackets football team =

American college football season

1961 American International Yellow Jackets football
- Conference: Independent
- Record: 5–4
- Head coach: Gayton Salvucci (6th season)

1961 Eastern college football independents records
	Conf.			Overall
Team	W	L	T	W		L		T
Middlebury		–		5	–	1	–	1
Villanova		–		8	–	2	–	0
Southern Connecticut State		–		7	–	2	–	0
Alfred		–		6	–	2	–	0
Montclair State		–		6	–	2	–	0
Delaware Valley		–		6	–	2	–	0
No. 17 Penn State		–		8	–	3	–	0
No. 14 Syracuse		–		8	–	3	–	0
Trinity (CT)		–		5	–	2	–	1
Holy Cross		–		7	–	3	–	0
C. W. Post		–		6	–	3	–	0
Army		–		6	–	4	–	0
Merchant Marine		–		6	–	4	–	0
Tufts		–		5	–	3	–	0
Rochester		–		5	–	3	–	0
Hamilton		–		4	–	3	–	0
Cortland State		–		4	–	3	–	0
American International		–		5	–	4	–	0
Colgate		–		5	–	4	–	0
Northeastern		–		4	–	4	–	0
Coast Guard		–		4	–	4	–	0
Ithaca		–		4	–	4	–	0
Boston University		–		4	–	5	–	0
Buffalo		–		4	–	5	–	0
Bridgeport		–		4	–	5	–	0
Norwich		–		3	–	4	–	1
Worcester Tech		–		3	–	4	–	0
Boston College		–		4	–	6	–	0
Union (NY)		–		3	–	5	–	0
Pittsburgh		–		3	–	7	–	0
Nichols		–		2	–	3	–	0
Trenton State		–		1	–	6	–	0
King's (PA)		–		1	–	8	–	0
Springfield		–		0	–	7	–	1
Brockport		–		0	–	7	–	0
RPI		–		0	–	7	–	0
Hobart		–		0	–	8	–	0
Rankings from AP Poll

The 1961 American International Yellow Jackets football team was an American football team that represented American International College as an independent during the 1961 college football season. In their sixth season under head coach Gayton Salvucci, the Yellow Jackets compiled a 5–4 record and were outscored by a total of 140 to 94.

== Schedule ==
Date	Opponent	Site	Result	Attendance	Source
September 23	at New Hampshire	Cowell Stadium; Durham, NH	W 6–0	4,000–4,500	
September 30	at UMass	Alumni Field; Amherst, MA	L 12–21	5,500	
October 7	at Amherst	Pratt Field; Amherst, MA	L 14–28	1,200–2,000	
October 14	Northeastern	AIC Park; Springfield, MA	L 15–33	1,000–1,200	
October 21	Central Connecticut State	Springfield, MA	W 27–0	1,200	
October 28	at Springfield^{†}	Pratt Field; Springfield, MA	W 7–6	6,000	
November 4	Maine Maritime	AIC Park; Springfield, MA	W 36–6	1,800	
November 11	at Bridgeport	Hedges Stadium; Bridgeport, CT	W 14–8	3,000–4,000	
November 18	at Southern Connecticut State	New Haven, CT	L 6–33	3,000–3,500	
^{†}Homecoming
