= 1961 Boston College Eagles football team =

American college football season

1961 Boston College Eagles football
- Conference: Independent
- Record: 4–6
- Head coach: Ernie Hefferle (2nd season)
- Captain: Joe Sikorski
- Home stadium: Alumni Stadium

1961 Eastern college football independents records
	Conf.			Overall
Team	W	L	T	W		L		T
Middlebury		–		5	–	1	–	1
Villanova		–		8	–	2	–	0
Southern Connecticut State		–		7	–	2	–	0
Alfred		–		6	–	2	–	0
Montclair State		–		6	–	2	–	0
Delaware Valley		–		6	–	2	–	0
No. 17 Penn State		–		8	–	3	–	0
No. 14 Syracuse		–		8	–	3	–	0
Trinity (CT)		–		5	–	2	–	1
Holy Cross		–		7	–	3	–	0
C. W. Post		–		6	–	3	–	0
Army		–		6	–	4	–	0
Merchant Marine		–		6	–	4	–	0
Tufts		–		5	–	3	–	0
Rochester		–		5	–	3	–	0
Hamilton		–		4	–	3	–	0
Cortland State		–		4	–	3	–	0
American International		–		5	–	4	–	0
Colgate		–		5	–	4	–	0
Northeastern		–		4	–	4	–	0
Coast Guard		–		4	–	4	–	0
Ithaca		–		4	–	4	–	0
Boston University		–		4	–	5	–	0
Buffalo		–		4	–	5	–	0
Bridgeport		–		4	–	5	–	0
Norwich		–		3	–	4	–	1
Worcester Tech		–		3	–	4	–	0
Boston College		–		4	–	6	–	0
Union (NY)		–		3	–	5	–	0
Pittsburgh		–		3	–	7	–	0
Nichols		–		2	–	3	–	0
Trenton State		–		1	–	6	–	0
King's (PA)		–		1	–	8	–	0
Springfield		–		0	–	7	–	1
Brockport		–		0	–	7	–	0
RPI		–		0	–	7	–	0
Hobart		–		0	–	8	–	0
Rankings from AP Poll

The 1961 Boston College Eagles football team represented Boston College as an independent during the 1961 college football season. Led by Ernie Hefferle in his second and final season as head coach, the Eagles compiled a record of 4–6. Boston College played home games at Alumni Stadium in Chestnut Hill, Massachusetts. After posting a losing record for the second consecutive year, Hefferle resigned become an assistant at Pittsburgh.

== Schedule ==
Date	Opponent	Site	Result	Attendance	Source
September 23	Cincinnati	Alumni Stadium; Chestnut Hill, MA	W 23–0	18,000	
September 30	at Northwestern	Dyche Stadium; Evanston, IL	L 0–45	35,418	
October 7	at Houston	Rice Stadium; Houston, TX	L 0–21	12,000	
October 13	at Detroit	University of Detroit Stadium; Detroit, MI	L 3–20	15,260	
October 21	Villanova	Alumni Stadium; Chestnut Hill, MA	W 22–6	20,500	
November 4	Iowa State	Alumni Stadium; Chestnut Hill, MA	W 14–10	17,600	
November 11	at Texas Tech	Jones Stadium; Lubbock, TX	L 6–14	20,000	
November 18	at Boston University	Boston University Field; Boston, MA (rivalry)	W 10–7	19,600	
November 25	Syracuse	Alumni Stadium; Chestnut Hill, MA	L 13–28	17,600	
December 2	at Holy Cross	Fitton Field; Worcester, MA (rivalry)	L 26–38	24,000	
