= 1961 Holy Cross Crusaders football team =

American college football season

1961 Holy Cross Crusaders football
- Conference: Independent
- Record: 7–3
- Head coach: Eddie Anderson (18th season)
- Captains: Jack Fellin; Jack Whalen
- Home stadium: Fitton Field

1961 Eastern college football independents records
	Conf.			Overall
Team	W	L	T	W		L		T
Middlebury		–		5	–	1	–	1
Villanova		–		8	–	2	–	0
Southern Connecticut State		–		7	–	2	–	0
Alfred		–		6	–	2	–	0
Montclair State		–		6	–	2	–	0
Delaware Valley		–		6	–	2	–	0
No. 17 Penn State		–		8	–	3	–	0
No. 14 Syracuse		–		8	–	3	–	0
Trinity (CT)		–		5	–	2	–	1
Holy Cross		–		7	–	3	–	0
C. W. Post		–		6	–	3	–	0
Army		–		6	–	4	–	0
Merchant Marine		–		6	–	4	–	0
Tufts		–		5	–	3	–	0
Rochester		–		5	–	3	–	0
Hamilton		–		4	–	3	–	0
Cortland State		–		4	–	3	–	0
American International		–		5	–	4	–	0
Colgate		–		5	–	4	–	0
Northeastern		–		4	–	4	–	0
Coast Guard		–		4	–	4	–	0
Ithaca		–		4	–	4	–	0
Boston University		–		4	–	5	–	0
Buffalo		–		4	–	5	–	0
Bridgeport		–		4	–	5	–	0
Norwich		–		3	–	4	–	1
Worcester Tech		–		3	–	4	–	0
Boston College		–		4	–	6	–	0
Union (NY)		–		3	–	5	–	0
Pittsburgh		–		3	–	7	–	0
Nichols		–		2	–	3	–	0
Trenton State		–		1	–	6	–	0
King's (PA)		–		1	–	8	–	0
Springfield		–		0	–	7	–	1
Brockport		–		0	–	7	–	0
RPI		–		0	–	7	–	0
Hobart		–		0	–	8	–	0
Rankings from AP Poll

The 1961 Holy Cross Crusaders football team was an American football team that represented the College of the Holy Cross as an independent during the 1961 college football season. Eddie Anderson returned for the 12th consecutive year as head coach, his 18th year overall. The team compiled a record of 7–3.

All home games were played at Fitton Field on the Holy Cross campus in Worcester, Massachusetts.

== Schedule ==
Date	Opponent	Site	Result	Attendance	Source
September 30	Villanova	Fitton Field; Worcester, MA	L 6–20	16,000	
October 7	at Buffalo	Rotary Field; Buffalo, NY	W 20–8	9,327–11,000	
October 14	at Boston University	Boston University Field; Boston, MA	W 20–7	10,000	
October 21	Dartmouth^{†}	Fitton Field; Worcester, MA	W 17–13	18,000	
October 28	at Syracuse	Archbold Stadium; Syracuse, NY	L 6–34	31,000	
November 4	Dayton^	Fitton Field; Worcester, MA	W 28–0	8,000	
November 11	UMass	Fitton Field; Worcester, MA	W 44–7	15,000	
November 18	at Penn State	Beaver Stadium; University Park, PA	L 14–34	28,500	
November 25	at Connecticut	Memorial Stadium; Storrs, CT	W 14–3	7,936	
December 2	Boston College	Fitton Field; Worcester, MA (rivalry)	W 38–26	24,200	
^{†}Homecoming; ^ Family Weekend

== Statistical leaders ==
Statistical leaders for the 1961 Crusaders included:

- Rushing: Pat McCarthy, 512 yards and 8 touchdowns on 128 attempts
- Passing: Pat McCarthy, 1,081 yards, 76 completions and 11 touchdowns on 165 attempts
- Receiving: Al Snyder, 558 yards and 5 touchdowns on 38 receptions
- Scoring: Pat McCarthy, 54 points from 8 touchdowns and 3 two-point conversions
- Total offense: Pat McCarthy, 1,593 yards (1,081 passing, 512 rushing)
- All-purpose yards: Al Snyder, 1,112 yards (558 receiving, 370 returning, 184 rushing)
