= 1961 Northeastern Huskies football team =

American college football season

1961 Northeastern Huskies football
- Conference: Independent
- Record: 4–4
- Head coach: Joe Zabilski (14th season)
- Home stadium: Kent Street Field

1961 Eastern college football independents records
	Conf.			Overall
Team	W	L	T	W		L		T
Middlebury		–		5	–	1	–	1
Villanova		–		8	–	2	–	0
Southern Connecticut State		–		7	–	2	–	0
Alfred		–		6	–	2	–	0
Montclair State		–		6	–	2	–	0
Delaware Valley		–		6	–	2	–	0
No. 17 Penn State		–		8	–	3	–	0
No. 14 Syracuse		–		8	–	3	–	0
Trinity (CT)		–		5	–	2	–	1
Holy Cross		–		7	–	3	–	0
C. W. Post		–		6	–	3	–	0
Army		–		6	–	4	–	0
Merchant Marine		–		6	–	4	–	0
Tufts		–		5	–	3	–	0
Rochester		–		5	–	3	–	0
Hamilton		–		4	–	3	–	0
Cortland State		–		4	–	3	–	0
American International		–		5	–	4	–	0
Colgate		–		5	–	4	–	0
Northeastern		–		4	–	4	–	0
Coast Guard		–		4	–	4	–	0
Ithaca		–		4	–	4	–	0
Boston University		–		4	–	5	–	0
Buffalo		–		4	–	5	–	0
Bridgeport		–		4	–	5	–	0
Norwich		–		3	–	4	–	1
Worcester Tech		–		3	–	4	–	0
Boston College		–		4	–	6	–	0
Union (NY)		–		3	–	5	–	0
Pittsburgh		–		3	–	7	–	0
Nichols		–		2	–	3	–	0
Trenton State		–		1	–	6	–	0
King's (PA)		–		1	–	8	–	0
Springfield		–		0	–	7	–	1
Brockport		–		0	–	7	–	0
RPI		–		0	–	7	–	0
Hobart		–		0	–	8	–	0
Rankings from AP Poll

The 1961 Northeastern Huskies football team was an American football team that represented Northeastern University as an independent during the 1961 college football season. In their 14th season under head coach Jim Zabilski, the Yellow Jackets compiled a 4–4 record and were outscored by a total of 118 to 117.

The Huskies tallied 1,687 yard of total offense (210.9 yards per game), consisting of 1,036 rushing yards and 651 passing yards. Quarterback Gerald Varnum led the team with 567 passing yards (42 completions on 110 attempts), 604 yards of total offense, and 24 points scored (four touchdowns). The leading rushers were fullback Paul Luciano (207 yards) and halfback Peter Furia (154 yards). The leading receivers were halfback Edward Brady (8 receptions for 170 yards) and end Frank Schettino (10 receptions for 166 yards).

== Schedule ==
Date	Opponent	Site	Result	Attendance	Source
September 23	Rhode Island	Kent Street Field; Brookline, MA	W 26–13	2,500–5,100	
September 30	at Norwich	Northfield, VT	W 24–2	2,500	
October 7	at Bridgeport	Bridgeport, CT	L 0–12	3,000	
October 14	at American International	AIC Park; Springfield, MA	W 33–15	1,000–1,200	
October 21	Springfield	Northeastern Field; Brookline, MA	W 27–21	2,100–4,800	
October 28	UMass	Kent Street Field; Brookline, MA	L 7–25	7,600	
November 4	Vermont	Kent Street Field; Brookline, MA	L 0–6	7,000–7,300	
November 11	at Southern Connecticut State	New Haven, CT	L 0–23	1,200–1,800	
