= 1961 Villanova Wildcats football team =

American college football season

1961 Villanova Wildcats football

Sun Bowl champion

Sun Bowl, W 17–9 vs. Wichita
- Conference: Independent
- Record: 8–2
- Head coach: Alexander F. Bell (2nd season)
- Captain: Richard Ross
- Home stadium: Villanova Stadium

1961 Eastern college football independents records
	Conf.			Overall
Team	W	L	T	W		L		T
Middlebury		–		5	–	1	–	1
Villanova		–		8	–	2	–	0
Southern Connecticut State		–		7	–	2	–	0
Alfred		–		6	–	2	–	0
Montclair State		–		6	–	2	–	0
Delaware Valley		–		6	–	2	–	0
No. 17 Penn State		–		8	–	3	–	0
No. 14 Syracuse		–		8	–	3	–	0
Trinity (CT)		–		5	–	2	–	1
Holy Cross		–		7	–	3	–	0
C. W. Post		–		6	–	3	–	0
Army		–		6	–	4	–	0
Merchant Marine		–		6	–	4	–	0
Tufts		–		5	–	3	–	0
Rochester		–		5	–	3	–	0
Hamilton		–		4	–	3	–	0
Cortland State		–		4	–	3	–	0
American International		–		5	–	4	–	0
Colgate		–		5	–	4	–	0
Northeastern		–		4	–	4	–	0
Coast Guard		–		4	–	4	–	0
Ithaca		–		4	–	4	–	0
Boston University		–		4	–	5	–	0
Buffalo		–		4	–	5	–	0
Bridgeport		–		4	–	5	–	0
Norwich		–		3	–	4	–	1
Worcester Tech		–		3	–	4	–	0
Boston College		–		4	–	6	–	0
Union (NY)		–		3	–	5	–	0
Pittsburgh		–		3	–	7	–	0
Nichols		–		2	–	3	–	0
Trenton State		–		1	–	6	–	0
King's (PA)		–		1	–	8	–	0
Springfield		–		0	–	7	–	1
Brockport		–		0	–	7	–	0
RPI		–		0	–	7	–	0
Hobart		–		0	–	8	–	0
Rankings from AP Poll

The 1961 Villanova Wildcats football team represented the Villanova University during the 1961 college football season. The head coach was Alexander F. Bell, coaching his second season with the Wildcats. The team played their home games at Villanova Stadium in Villanova, Pennsylvania. Villanova won the 1961 Sun Bowl and finished the season 8–2.

== Schedule ==
Date	Opponent	Site	Result	Attendance	Source
September 16	at Miami (OH)*	Miami Field; Oxford, OH	W 33–0		
September 23	VMI	Villanova Stadium; Villanova, PA	W 22–0	12,000	
September 30	at Holy Cross*	Fitton Field; Worcester, MA	W 20–6	16,000	
October 7	at UMass*	Alumni Field; Amherst, MA	W 33–13	6,309	
October 14	Buffalo	Villanova Stadium; Villanova, PA	W 28–6	10,000	
October 21	at Boston College	Alumni Stadium; Chestnut Hill, MA	L 6–22	20,500	
October 28	Quantico Marines*	Villanova Stadium; Villanova, PA	W 34–0		
November 4	West Chester*	Villanova Stadium; Villanova, PA	W 40–13	14,500	
November 10	at Detroit	University of Detroit Stadium; Detroit, MI	L 6–20	15,790	
December 30	vs. Wichita	Sun Bowl; El Paso, TX (Sun Bowl)	W 17–9	15,000	
*Non-conference game
