= 1961 Syracuse Orangemen football team =

American college football season

1961 Syracuse Orangemen football

Liberty Bowl champion

Liberty Bowl, W 15–14 vs. Miami (FL)
- Conference: Independent

Ranking
- Coaches: No. 16
- AP: No. 14
- Record: 8–3
- Head coach: Ben Schwartzwalder (13th season)
- Captain: Dick Easterly
- Home stadium: Archbold Stadium

1961 Eastern college football independents records
	Conf.			Overall
Team	W	L	T	W		L		T
Middlebury		–		5	–	1	–	1
Villanova		–		8	–	2	–	0
Southern Connecticut State		–		7	–	2	–	0
Alfred		–		6	–	2	–	0
Montclair State		–		6	–	2	–	0
Delaware Valley		–		6	–	2	–	0
No. 17 Penn State		–		8	–	3	–	0
No. 14 Syracuse		–		8	–	3	–	0
Trinity (CT)		–		5	–	2	–	1
Holy Cross		–		7	–	3	–	0
C. W. Post		–		6	–	3	–	0
Army		–		6	–	4	–	0
Merchant Marine		–		6	–	4	–	0
Tufts		–		5	–	3	–	0
Rochester		–		5	–	3	–	0
Hamilton		–		4	–	3	–	0
Cortland State		–		4	–	3	–	0
American International		–		5	–	4	–	0
Colgate		–		5	–	4	–	0
Northeastern		–		4	–	4	–	0
Coast Guard		–		4	–	4	–	0
Ithaca		–		4	–	4	–	0
Boston University		–		4	–	5	–	0
Buffalo		–		4	–	5	–	0
Bridgeport		–		4	–	5	–	0
Norwich		–		3	–	4	–	1
Worcester Tech		–		3	–	4	–	0
Boston College		–		4	–	6	–	0
Union (NY)		–		3	–	5	–	0
Pittsburgh		–		3	–	7	–	0
Nichols		–		2	–	3	–	0
Trenton State		–		1	–	6	–	0
King's (PA)		–		1	–	8	–	0
Springfield		–		0	–	7	–	1
Brockport		–		0	–	7	–	0
RPI		–		0	–	7	–	0
Hobart		–		0	–	8	–	0
Rankings from AP Poll

The 1961 Syracuse Orangemen football team was an American football team that represented Syracuse University as an independent during the 1961 college football season. In their 13th year underhead coach Ben Schwartzwalder, the Orangemen compiled an 8–3 record, outscored opponents by a total of 253 to 117, and defeated Miami (FL) in the 1961 Liberty Bowl. They were ranked No. 14 in the final AP poll and No. 16 in the final UPI poll.

Running back Ernie Davis rushed for 823 yards and 12 touchdowns, was selected as a consensus All-American, and became the first African-American player to win the Heisman Trophy.

The team played its home games at Archbold Stadium in Syracuse, New York.

== Schedule ==
Date	Opponent	Rank	Site	Result	Attendance	Source
September 23	at Oregon State	No. 10	Multnomah Stadium; Portland, OR	W 19–8	35,729	
September 30	West Virginia	No. 5	Archbold Stadium; Syracuse, NY (rivalry)	W 29–14	25,000	
October 7	at Maryland	No. 7	Byrd Stadium; College Park, MD	L 21–22	35,000	
October 14	at Nebraska		Memorial Stadium; Lincoln, NE	W 28–6	35,387	
October 21	at Penn State		Beaver Stadium; University Park, PA (rivalry)	L 0–14	44,390	
October 28	Holy Cross		Archbold Stadium; Syracuse, NY	W 34–6	31,000	
November 4	Pittsburgh		Archbold Stadium; Syracuse, NY (rivalry)	W 28–9	40,000	
November 11	Colgate		Archbold Stadium; Syracuse, NY (rivalry)	W 51–8	25,000	
November 18	at Notre Dame	No. 10	Notre Dame Stadium; Notre Dame, IN	L 15–17	49,246	
November 25	at Boston College		Alumni Stadium; Chestnut Hill, MA	W 28–13	17,600	
December 16	vs. Miami (FL)	No. 14	Philadelphia Municipal Stadium; Philadelphia, PA (Liberty Bowl)	W 15–14	15,712	
Rankings from AP Poll released prior to the game

== Statistics ==
Quarterback Dave Sarette was the team's passing leader. He completed 56 of 106 passes (51.9%) for 813 yards for nine touchdowns and eight interceptions.

Ernie Davis led the team in rushing with 823 yards on 150 carries for an average gain of 5.5 yards per attempt. Davis also caught 16 passes for 157 yards. He also led the team in scoring with 84 points on 14 touchdowns.

Davis was followed by Gary Fallon (299 yards, 66 carries, 4.5-yard average) and Bill Meyers (163 yards, 23 carries, 7.1-yard average).

The team's leading receivers were John Mackey (15 receptions, 321 yards) and Dick Easterly (12 receptions, 207 yards). Mackey later played tight end for the Baltimore Colts and was inducted into the Pro Football Hall of Fame.

== Awards and honors ==
Halfback Ernie Davis received numerous awards at the end of the 1961 season including the following:

- On November 28, 1961, Davis was announced at the winner of the Heisman Trophy as college football's player of the year. He was the first black player to receive the award. At the time, Davis called it "the thrill of a lifetime," "something you dream about but you never really believe it can happen to you."
- Davis was a unanimous first-team pick on the 1961 All-America college football team. He received first-team honors from the Associated Press (AP), United Press International (UPI), American Football Coaches Association, Football Writers Association of America, and The Sporting News, among others.
- He was also selected as the Associated Press Player of the Year and received the Chic Harley Award from the Touchdown Club of Columbus as the college football player of the year.

Davis was selected with the No. 1 pick in the 1962 NFL draft, but he was diagnosed with leukemia, never played professional football, and died in May 1963. He was posthumously inducted into the College Football Hall of Fame in 1979.

Four Syracuse players received honors from the AP or UPI on the 1961 All-Eastern football team: halfback Ernie Davis (AP-1, UPI-1), tackle John Brown, end John Mackey (AP-2, UPI-3), and center Bob Stern (UPI-2).

== 1962 NFL draft ==
Player	Round	Pick	Position	Club
Ernie Davis	1	1	Running back	Washington Redskins
Pete Brokaw	8	107	Back	Baltimore Colts
George Francovitch	10	131	Guard	St. Louis Cardinals
Gary Fallon	12	157	Halfback	Minnesota Vikings
Dick Easterly	14	190	Back	San Francisco 49ers
Bob Stem	19	265	Center	New York Giants

Ernie Davis was the first black player to be chosen first overall in the NFL Draft. Davis was drafted by the Washington Redskins then traded to the Clevand Browns in the first round of the 1962 American Football League draft. However, he never played in the NFL; he was diagnosed with leukemia shortly before he was to enter the league, and he died in May 1963, less than a year after his diagnosis.
