= 1961 Rochester Yellowjackets football team =

American college football season

1961 Rochester Yellowjackets football
- Conference: Independent
- Record: 5–3
- Head coach: Paul Bitgood (1st season)
- Captains: Tony Stranges; Vince Russo
- Home stadium: Fauver Stadium

1961 Eastern college football independents records
	Conf.			Overall
Team	W	L	T	W		L		T
Middlebury		–		5	–	1	–	1
Villanova		–		8	–	2	–	0
Southern Connecticut State		–		7	–	2	–	0
Alfred		–		6	–	2	–	0
Montclair State		–		6	–	2	–	0
Delaware Valley		–		6	–	2	–	0
No. 17 Penn State		–		8	–	3	–	0
No. 14 Syracuse		–		8	–	3	–	0
Trinity (CT)		–		5	–	2	–	1
Holy Cross		–		7	–	3	–	0
C. W. Post		–		6	–	3	–	0
Army		–		6	–	4	–	0
Merchant Marine		–		6	–	4	–	0
Tufts		–		5	–	3	–	0
Rochester		–		5	–	3	–	0
Hamilton		–		4	–	3	–	0
Cortland State		–		4	–	3	–	0
American International		–		5	–	4	–	0
Colgate		–		5	–	4	–	0
Northeastern		–		4	–	4	–	0
Coast Guard		–		4	–	4	–	0
Ithaca		–		4	–	4	–	0
Boston University		–		4	–	5	–	0
Buffalo		–		4	–	5	–	0
Bridgeport		–		4	–	5	–	0
Norwich		–		3	–	4	–	1
Worcester Tech		–		3	–	4	–	0
Boston College		–		4	–	6	–	0
Union (NY)		–		3	–	5	–	0
Pittsburgh		–		3	–	7	–	0
Nichols		–		2	–	3	–	0
Trenton State		–		1	–	6	–	0
King's (PA)		–		1	–	8	–	0
Springfield		–		0	–	7	–	1
Brockport		–		0	–	7	–	0
RPI		–		0	–	7	–	0
Hobart		–		0	–	8	–	0
Rankings from AP Poll

The 1961 Rochester Yellowjackets football team was an American football team that represented the University of Rochester as an independent during the 1961 college football season. In their first year under head coach Paul Bitgood, the Yellowjackets compiled a 5–3 record.

Tony Stranges and Vince Russo were the team's co-captains. The team played its home games at Fauver Stadium in Rochester, New York.

== Schedule ==
Date	Opponent	Site	Result	Attendance	Source
September 23	vs. St. Lawrence	Weeks Field; Canton, NY	L 0–7	3,700	
September 30	at Hamilton	Hamilton, NY	W 24–14		
October 7	Hobart	Fauver Stadium; Rochester, NY	W 27–6	5,000	
October 14	at Union (NY)	Schenectady, NY	L 0–15		
October 21	at Vermont	Centennial Field; Burlington, VT	L 0–18	6,500–8,000	
October 28	Carnegie Tech	Fauver Stadium; Rochester, NY	W 15–7	5,000	
November 11	Washington University	Fauver Stadium; Rochester, NY	W 20–6		
November 18	RPI	Fauver Stadium; Rochester, NY	W 37–0	2,600	
