= 1961 Colgate Red Raiders football team =

American college football season

1961 Colgate Red Raiders football
- Conference: Independent
- Record: 5–4
- Head coach: Alva Kelley (3rd season)
- Captain: Kenneth Kerr
- Home stadium: Colgate Athletic Field

1961 Eastern college football independents records
	Conf.			Overall
Team	W	L	T	W		L		T
Middlebury		–		5	–	1	–	1
Villanova		–		8	–	2	–	0
Southern Connecticut State		–		7	–	2	–	0
Alfred		–		6	–	2	–	0
Montclair State		–		6	–	2	–	0
Delaware Valley		–		6	–	2	–	0
No. 17 Penn State		–		8	–	3	–	0
No. 14 Syracuse		–		8	–	3	–	0
Trinity (CT)		–		5	–	2	–	1
Holy Cross		–		7	–	3	–	0
C. W. Post		–		6	–	3	–	0
Army		–		6	–	4	–	0
Merchant Marine		–		6	–	4	–	0
Tufts		–		5	–	3	–	0
Rochester		–		5	–	3	–	0
Hamilton		–		4	–	3	–	0
Cortland State		–		4	–	3	–	0
American International		–		5	–	4	–	0
Colgate		–		5	–	4	–	0
Northeastern		–		4	–	4	–	0
Coast Guard		–		4	–	4	–	0
Ithaca		–		4	–	4	–	0
Boston University		–		4	–	5	–	0
Buffalo		–		4	–	5	–	0
Bridgeport		–		4	–	5	–	0
Norwich		–		3	–	4	–	1
Worcester Tech		–		3	–	4	–	0
Boston College		–		4	–	6	–	0
Union (NY)		–		3	–	5	–	0
Pittsburgh		–		3	–	7	–	0
Nichols		–		2	–	3	–	0
Trenton State		–		1	–	6	–	0
King's (PA)		–		1	–	8	–	0
Springfield		–		0	–	7	–	1
Brockport		–		0	–	7	–	0
RPI		–		0	–	7	–	0
Hobart		–		0	–	8	–	0
Rankings from AP Poll

The 1961 Colgate Red Raiders football team was an American football team that represented Colgate University as an independent during the 1961 college football season. In its third season under head coach Alva Kelley, the team compiled a 5–4 record. Kenneth Kerr was the team captain.

The team played its home games at Colgate Athletic Field in Hamilton, New York.

== Schedule ==
Date	Opponent	Site	Result	Attendance	Source
September 30	at Cornell	Schoellkopf Field; Ithaca, NY (rivalry)	L 0–34	20,000	
October 7	Bucknell	Colgate Athletic Field; Hamilton, NY	W 13–0	5,200	
October 14	at Harvard	Harvard Stadium; Boston, MA	W 15–0	12,000	
October 21	at Princeton	Palmer Stadium; Princeton, NJ	W 15–0	12,000	
October 28	at Yale	Yale Bowl; New Haven, CT	W 14–8	32,936	
November 4	at Lehigh	Taylor Stadium; Bethlehem, PA	L 15–20	10,000	
November 11	at Syracuse	Archbold Stadium; Syracuse, NY (rivalry)	L 8–51	25,000	
November 18	Rutgers	Colgate Athletic Field; Hamilton, NY	L 6–26	8,500	
November 23	at Brown	Brown Stadium; Providence, RI	W 30–6	5,000	

== Leading players ==
Statistical leaders for the 1961 Red Raiders included:

- Rushing: Daniel Keating, 466 yards and 2 touchdowns on 104 attempts
- Passing: Daniel Keating, 495 yards, 35 completions and 4 touchdowns on 83 attempts
- Receiving: James Heilman, 191 yards and 2 touchdowns on 12 receptions
- Total offense: Daniel Keating, 961 yards (495 passing, 466 rushing)
- Scoring: James Heilman, 32 points from 4 touchdowns and 4 two-point conversions
- All-purpose yards: James Heilman, 713 yards (357 rushing, 264 receiving, 210 punt returning, 76 kickoff returning, 17 interception returning)
