= 1961 Army Cadets football team =

American college football season

1961 Army Cadets football
- Conference: Independent
- Record: 6–4
- Head coach: Dale Hall (3rd season)
- Captain: Michael Casp
- Home stadium: Michie Stadium

1961 Eastern college football independents records
	Conf.			Overall
Team	W	L	T	W		L		T
Middlebury		–		5	–	1	–	1
Villanova		–		8	–	2	–	0
Southern Connecticut State		–		7	–	2	–	0
Alfred		–		6	–	2	–	0
Montclair State		–		6	–	2	–	0
Delaware Valley		–		6	–	2	–	0
No. 17 Penn State		–		8	–	3	–	0
No. 14 Syracuse		–		8	–	3	–	0
Trinity (CT)		–		5	–	2	–	1
Holy Cross		–		7	–	3	–	0
C. W. Post		–		6	–	3	–	0
Army		–		6	–	4	–	0
Merchant Marine		–		6	–	4	–	0
Tufts		–		5	–	3	–	0
Rochester		–		5	–	3	–	0
Hamilton		–		4	–	3	–	0
Cortland State		–		4	–	3	–	0
American International		–		5	–	4	–	0
Colgate		–		5	–	4	–	0
Northeastern		–		4	–	4	–	0
Coast Guard		–		4	–	4	–	0
Ithaca		–		4	–	4	–	0
Boston University		–		4	–	5	–	0
Buffalo		–		4	–	5	–	0
Bridgeport		–		4	–	5	–	0
Norwich		–		3	–	4	–	1
Worcester Tech		–		3	–	4	–	0
Boston College		–		4	–	6	–	0
Union (NY)		–		3	–	5	–	0
Pittsburgh		–		3	–	7	–	0
Nichols		–		2	–	3	–	0
Trenton State		–		1	–	6	–	0
King's (PA)		–		1	–	8	–	0
Springfield		–		0	–	7	–	1
Brockport		–		0	–	7	–	0
RPI		–		0	–	7	–	0
Hobart		–		0	–	8	–	0
Rankings from AP Poll

The 1961 Army Cadets football team was an American football team that represented the United States Military Academy as an independent during the 1961 college football season. In their third year under head coach Dale Hall, the Cadets compiled a 6–4 record and outscored opponents by a total of 224 to 118.

Senior halfback Al Rushatz led the team in both rushing (556 yards) and scoring (48 points) and was selected as a first-team player on the 1961 All-Eastern football team.

The team played its home games at Michie Stadium in West Point, New York.

== Schedule ==
Date	Opponent	Site	TV	Result	Attendance	Source
September 23	Richmond	Michie Stadium; West Point, NY		W 24–6	11,250	
September 30	Boston University	Michie Stadium; West Point, NY		W 31–7	16,250	
October 7	at Michigan	Michigan Stadium; Ann Arbor, MI		L 8–38	65,012	
October 14	at Penn State	Beaver Stadium; University Park, PA		W 10–6	44,120	
October 21	Idaho	Michie Stadium; West Point, NY		W 51–7	18,275	
October 28	West Virginia	Michie Stadium; West Point, NY		L 3–7	23,525	
November 4	Detroit	Michie Stadium; West Point, NY		W 34–7	15,525	
November 11	William & Mary	Michie Stadium; West Point, NY		W 48–13	18,150	
November 18	vs. Oklahoma	Yankee Stadium; Bronx, NY	ABC	L 8–14	37,200	
December 2	vs. Navy	Philadelphia Municipal Stadium; Philadelphia, PA (Army–Navy Game)		L 7–13	101,000	

== Statistics ==
During their 10-game 1961 season, the Cadets gained an average of 206.1 rushing yards and 111.1 passing yards per game. On defense, they gave up an average of 118.5 rushing yards and 90.1 passing yards per game.

Senior halfback Al Rushatz led the team in both rushing (556 yards, 127 attempts, 4.4-yard average) and scoring (48 points, eight touchdowns). Rushatz scored every Army touchdown against Navy in 1960 and 1961.

The team's passing leaders were Dick Eckert (56-for-105, 53.3%, 649 yards, three touchdowns, six interceptions); Jim Beierschmitt (14-for-33, 42.4%, 237 yards, two touchdowns, two interceptions; and Art Lewis (11-for-17, 64.7%, 210 yards, two touchdowns, one interception).

The team's leading rushers following Rushatz were Joe Blackgrove (287 yards, 59 carries, 4.9-yard average); Tom Culver (233 yards, 38 carries, 6.1-yard average); Ray Paske (207 yards, 48 carries, 4.3-yard average); Pete King (153 yards, 38 carries, 4.0-yard average); and Dick Eckert (145 yards, 90 carries, 1.6-yard average).

The team's leading receivers were Tom Culver (305 yards, 20 receptions, 15.3-yard average); Paul Zmuida (127 yards, eight receptions, 15.9-yard average); and Joe Blackgrove (102 yards, five receptions, 20.4-yard average).

The leading scorers after Rushatz were Tom Culver (four touchdowns, 24 points) followed by George Pappas and Ray Paske with three touchdowns and 18 points each.
