= 1961 Alfred Saxons football team =

American college football season

1961 Alfred Saxons football
- Conference: Independent
- Record: 6–2
- Head coach: Alex Yunevich (21st season)
- Home stadium: Merrill Field

1961 Eastern college football independents records
| | Conf. | | | Overall |
| Team | W | L | T | W | | L | | T |
|---|---|---|---|---|---|---|---|---|
| Middlebury | | – | | 5 | – | 1 | – | 1 |
| Villanova | | – | | 8 | – | 2 | – | 0 |
| Southern Connecticut State | | – | | 7 | – | 2 | – | 0 |
| Alfred | | – | | 6 | – | 2 | – | 0 |
| Montclair State | | – | | 6 | – | 2 | – | 0 |
| Delaware Valley | | – | | 6 | – | 2 | – | 0 |
| No. 17 Penn State | | – | | 8 | – | 3 | – | 0 |
| No. 14 Syracuse | | – | | 8 | – | 3 | – | 0 |
| Trinity (CT) | | – | | 5 | – | 2 | – | 1 |
| Holy Cross | | – | | 7 | – | 3 | – | 0 |
| C. W. Post | | – | | 6 | – | 3 | – | 0 |
| Army | | – | | 6 | – | 4 | – | 0 |
| Merchant Marine | | – | | 6 | – | 4 | – | 0 |
| Tufts | | – | | 5 | – | 3 | – | 0 |
| Rochester | | – | | 5 | – | 3 | – | 0 |
| Hamilton | | – | | 4 | – | 3 | – | 0 |
| Cortland State | | – | | 4 | – | 3 | – | 0 |
| American International | | – | | 5 | – | 4 | – | 0 |
| Colgate | | – | | 5 | – | 4 | – | 0 |
| Northeastern | | – | | 4 | – | 4 | – | 0 |
| Coast Guard | | – | | 4 | – | 4 | – | 0 |
| Ithaca | | – | | 4 | – | 4 | – | 0 |
| Boston University | | – | | 4 | – | 5 | – | 0 |
| Buffalo | | – | | 4 | – | 5 | – | 0 |
| Bridgeport | | – | | 4 | – | 5 | – | 0 |
| Norwich | | – | | 3 | – | 4 | – | 1 |
| Worcester Tech | | – | | 3 | – | 4 | – | 0 |
| Boston College | | – | | 4 | – | 6 | – | 0 |
| Union (NY) | | – | | 3 | – | 5 | – | 0 |
| Pittsburgh | | – | | 3 | – | 7 | – | 0 |
| Nichols | | – | | 2 | – | 3 | – | 0 |
| Trenton State | | – | | 1 | – | 6 | – | 0 |
| King's (PA) | | – | | 1 | – | 8 | – | 0 |
| Springfield | | – | | 0 | – | 7 | – | 1 |
| Brockport | | – | | 0 | – | 7 | – | 0 |
| RPI | | – | | 0 | – | 7 | – | 0 |
| Hobart | | – | | 0 | – | 8 | – | 0 |
Rankings from AP Poll

The 1961 Alfred Saxons football team was an American football team that represented Alfred University as an independent during the 1961 college football season. In their 21st season under head coach Alex Yunevich, the Saxons compiled a 6–2 record and outscored opponents by a total of 110 to 87. The team played home games at Merrill Field in Alfred, New York.

== Schedule ==
| Date | Opponent | Site | Result | Attendance | Source |
|---|---|---|---|---|---|
| September 23 | Cortland State | Merrill Field; Alfred, NY | L 6–13 | | |
| September 30 | at Brockport | Brockport, NY | W 20–0 | | |
| October 7 | Union (NY) | Merrill Field; Alfred, NY | W 12–6 | 2,500 | |
| October 14 | St. Lawrence^{†} | Merrill Field; Alfred, NY | W 16–8 | 3,500 | |
| October 21 | at Hobart | Boswell Field; Geneva, NY | W 16–13 | 1,500 | |
| October 28 | at Grove City | Grove City, PA | L 14–31 | 1,700 | |
| November 4 | at Ithaca | South Hill Field; Ithaca, NY | W 14–7 | 600 | |
| November 11 | Upsala | Merrill Field; Alfred, NY | W 12–9 | 2,500 | |
^{†}Homecoming
