= 1961 Hamilton Continentals football team =

American college football season

1961 Hamilton Continentals football
- Conference: Independent
- Record: 4–3
- Head coach: Donald M. Jones (13th season)

1961 Eastern college football independents records
	Conf.			Overall
Team	W	L	T	W		L		T
Middlebury		–		5	–	1	–	1
Villanova		–		8	–	2	–	0
Southern Connecticut State		–		7	–	2	–	0
Alfred		–		6	–	2	–	0
Montclair State		–		6	–	2	–	0
Delaware Valley		–		6	–	2	–	0
No. 17 Penn State		–		8	–	3	–	0
No. 14 Syracuse		–		8	–	3	–	0
Trinity (CT)		–		5	–	2	–	1
Holy Cross		–		7	–	3	–	0
C. W. Post		–		6	–	3	–	0
Army		–		6	–	4	–	0
Merchant Marine		–		6	–	4	–	0
Tufts		–		5	–	3	–	0
Rochester		–		5	–	3	–	0
Hamilton		–		4	–	3	–	0
Cortland State		–		4	–	3	–	0
American International		–		5	–	4	–	0
Colgate		–		5	–	4	–	0
Northeastern		–		4	–	4	–	0
Coast Guard		–		4	–	4	–	0
Ithaca		–		4	–	4	–	0
Boston University		–		4	–	5	–	0
Buffalo		–		4	–	5	–	0
Bridgeport		–		4	–	5	–	0
Norwich		–		3	–	4	–	1
Worcester Tech		–		3	–	4	–	0
Boston College		–		4	–	6	–	0
Union (NY)		–		3	–	5	–	0
Pittsburgh		–		3	–	7	–	0
Nichols		–		2	–	3	–	0
Trenton State		–		1	–	6	–	0
King's (PA)		–		1	–	8	–	0
Springfield		–		0	–	7	–	1
Brockport		–		0	–	7	–	0
RPI		–		0	–	7	–	0
Hobart		–		0	–	8	–	0
Rankings from AP Poll

The 1961 Hamilton Continentals football team was an American football team that represented Hamilton College of Clinton, New York, as an independent during the 1961 college football season. In their 13th season under head coach Donald M. Jones, the Continentals compiled a 4–3 record and were outscored by a total of 153 to 144.

== Schedule ==
Date	Opponent	Site	Result	Attendance	Source
September 30	Rochester	Clinton, NY	L 14–24		
October 7	at RPI	'86 Field; Troy, NY	W 22–10		
October 14	Hobart	Clinton, NY	W 12–6		
October 28	St. Lawrence	Clinton, NY	W 30–23		
November 4	at Wesleyan	Andrus Field; Middletown, CT	L 20–21	3,000	
November 11	Wagner	Clinton, NY	L 20–48	1,900	
November 18	at Union (NY)	Schenectady, NY	W 26–21		
