= 1961 Springfield Maroons football team =

American college football season

1961 Springfield Maroons football
- Conference: Independent
- Record: 0–7–1
- Head coach: Ted Dunn (4th season)
- Home stadium: Pratt Field

1961 Eastern college football independents records
	Conf.			Overall
Team	W	L	T	W		L		T
Middlebury		–		5	–	1	–	1
Villanova		–		8	–	2	–	0
Southern Connecticut State		–		7	–	2	–	0
Alfred		–		6	–	2	–	0
Montclair State		–		6	–	2	–	0
Delaware Valley		–		6	–	2	–	0
No. 17 Penn State		–		8	–	3	–	0
No. 14 Syracuse		–		8	–	3	–	0
Trinity (CT)		–		5	–	2	–	1
Holy Cross		–		7	–	3	–	0
C. W. Post		–		6	–	3	–	0
Army		–		6	–	4	–	0
Merchant Marine		–		6	–	4	–	0
Tufts		–		5	–	3	–	0
Rochester		–		5	–	3	–	0
Hamilton		–		4	–	3	–	0
Cortland State		–		4	–	3	–	0
American International		–		5	–	4	–	0
Colgate		–		5	–	4	–	0
Northeastern		–		4	–	4	–	0
Coast Guard		–		4	–	4	–	0
Ithaca		–		4	–	4	–	0
Boston University		–		4	–	5	–	0
Buffalo		–		4	–	5	–	0
Bridgeport		–		4	–	5	–	0
Norwich		–		3	–	4	–	1
Worcester Tech		–		3	–	4	–	0
Boston College		–		4	–	6	–	0
Union (NY)		–		3	–	5	–	0
Pittsburgh		–		3	–	7	–	0
Nichols		–		2	–	3	–	0
Trenton State		–		1	–	6	–	0
King's (PA)		–		1	–	8	–	0
Springfield		–		0	–	7	–	1
Brockport		–		0	–	7	–	0
RPI		–		0	–	7	–	0
Hobart		–		0	–	8	–	0
Rankings from AP Poll

The 1961 Springfield Maroons football team was an American football team that represented Springfield College as an independent during the 1961 college football season. In their fourth season under head coach Ted Dunn, the Maroons compiled a 0–7–1 record and were outscored by a total of 173 to 75. The team played home games at Pratt Field in Springfield, Massachusetts.

The team tallied 1,583 yards of total offense (879 rushing yards, 704 passing yards). Quarterback Dave Leete led the team in multiple statistical categories, including passing yards (704), rushing yards (384), total offense (990 yards), and scoring (54 points on nine touchdowns). The team's receiving leaders were ends George McCombe (8 receptions for 166 yards) and Jim Curtis (13 receptions for 160 yards). Fullback Jack Charney was the team's number two rusher with 185 yards on 57 carries.

== Schedule ==
Date	Opponent	Site	Result	Attendance	Source
September 30	Amherst	Pratt Field; Springfield, MA	L 0–24	1,500–2,000	
October 7	Williams	Pratt Field; Springfield, MA	L 7–18	1,500	
October 14	at Colby	Waterville, ME	L 21–27	3,000	
October 21	at Northeastern	Northeastern Field; Brookline, MA	L 21–27	2,100–4,800	
October 28	American International	Pratt Field; Springfield, MA	L 6–7	6,000	
November 4	at Rhode Island	Meade Stadium; Kingston, RI	T 6–6	2,000–3,500	
November 11	New Hampshire	Pratt Field; Springfield, MA	L 14–36	2,500–3,300	
November 18	Hofstra	Pratt Field; Springfield, MA	L 0–28	3,000	
