= 1961 Worcester Tech Engineers football team =

American college football season

1961 Worcester Tech Engineers football
- Conference: Independent
- Record: 3–4
- Head coach: Robert W. Pritchard (15th season)
- Home stadium: Alumni Stadium

1961 Eastern college football independents records
	Conf.			Overall
Team	W	L	T	W		L		T
Middlebury		–		5	–	1	–	1
Villanova		–		8	–	2	–	0
Southern Connecticut State		–		7	–	2	–	0
Alfred		–		6	–	2	–	0
Montclair State		–		6	–	2	–	0
Delaware Valley		–		6	–	2	–	0
No. 17 Penn State		–		8	–	3	–	0
No. 14 Syracuse		–		8	–	3	–	0
Trinity (CT)		–		5	–	2	–	1
Holy Cross		–		7	–	3	–	0
C. W. Post		–		6	–	3	–	0
Army		–		6	–	4	–	0
Merchant Marine		–		6	–	4	–	0
Tufts		–		5	–	3	–	0
Rochester		–		5	–	3	–	0
Hamilton		–		4	–	3	–	0
Cortland State		–		4	–	3	–	0
American International		–		5	–	4	–	0
Colgate		–		5	–	4	–	0
Northeastern		–		4	–	4	–	0
Coast Guard		–		4	–	4	–	0
Ithaca		–		4	–	4	–	0
Boston University		–		4	–	5	–	0
Buffalo		–		4	–	5	–	0
Bridgeport		–		4	–	5	–	0
Norwich		–		3	–	4	–	1
Worcester Tech		–		3	–	4	–	0
Boston College		–		4	–	6	–	0
Union (NY)		–		3	–	5	–	0
Pittsburgh		–		3	–	7	–	0
Nichols		–		2	–	3	–	0
Trenton State		–		1	–	6	–	0
King's (PA)		–		1	–	8	–	0
Springfield		–		0	–	7	–	1
Brockport		–		0	–	7	–	0
RPI		–		0	–	7	–	0
Hobart		–		0	–	8	–	0
Rankings from AP Poll

The 1961 Worcester Tech Engineers football team was an American football team that represented the Worcester Polytechnic Institute (WPI) as an independent during the 1961 college football season. In their 15th year under head coach Robert W. Pritchard, the Engineers compiled a 3–4 record and outscored opponents by a total of 140 to 93. The team played home games at Alumni Stadium in Worcester, Massachusetts.

Quarterback Peter Martin led the team in both passing (39-for-89, 556 yards) and total offense (520 yards).

== Schedule ==
Date	Opponent	Site	Result	Attendance	Source
September 23	at Central Connecticut State	New Britain, CT	L 18–24	3,000	
October 7	Middlebury	Worcester, MA	L 2–6	3,100–3,700	
October 14	at Bates	Garcelon Field; Lewiston, ME	W 38–14	1,500	
October 21	Wesleyan^{†}	Worcester, MA	W 21–20	3,000–3,500	
October 28	at Coast Guard	Jones Field; New London, CT	L 14–21	3,500	
November 4	RPI	Worcester, MA	W 40–0	3,300	
November 11	at Norwich	Sabine Field; Northfield, VT	L 7–9	1,500	
^{†}Homecoming

== Statistics ==
Worcester Tech tallied 1,526 yards of total offense (218 yards per game), consisting of 937 rushing yards (134 yards per game) and 589 passing yards (84 yards per game). On defense, the Engineers gave up 1,297 yards (185.3 yards per game), including 787 rushing yards (112 yards per game) and 510 passing yards (73 yards per game).

Peter Martin led the team in passing, completing 39 of 89 attempts for 556 yards with five touchdowns and eight interceptions. Despite losing 36 rushing yards, Martin also led the team with 520 yards of total offense. The team's rushing leaders were Ronald Gemma (352 yards on 63 carries) and Robert Grenier (215 yards on 62 carries). The receiving leaders were George Oldham (10 receptions for 187 yards and no touchdowns) and William Shields (eight receptions for 127 yards and a touchdown). The scoring leaders were Robert Grenier (five touchdowns, 30 points) and Ronald Gemma and Michael Littizzio (four touchdowns and 24 points each). Richard Ryczek handled punting duties, making 19 punts for 640 yards, an average of 33.7 yards per punt.
