= 1961 Boston University Terriers football team =

American college football season

1961 Boston University Terriers football
- Conference: Independent
- Record: 4–5
- Head coach: Steve Sinko (5th season)
- Home stadium: Boston University Field

1961 Eastern college football independents records
	Conf.			Overall
Team	W	L	T	W		L		T
Middlebury		–		5	–	1	–	1
Villanova		–		8	–	2	–	0
Southern Connecticut State		–		7	–	2	–	0
Alfred		–		6	–	2	–	0
Montclair State		–		6	–	2	–	0
Delaware Valley		–		6	–	2	–	0
No. 17 Penn State		–		8	–	3	–	0
No. 14 Syracuse		–		8	–	3	–	0
Trinity (CT)		–		5	–	2	–	1
Holy Cross		–		7	–	3	–	0
C. W. Post		–		6	–	3	–	0
Army		–		6	–	4	–	0
Merchant Marine		–		6	–	4	–	0
Tufts		–		5	–	3	–	0
Rochester		–		5	–	3	–	0
Hamilton		–		4	–	3	–	0
Cortland State		–		4	–	3	–	0
American International		–		5	–	4	–	0
Colgate		–		5	–	4	–	0
Northeastern		–		4	–	4	–	0
Coast Guard		–		4	–	4	–	0
Ithaca		–		4	–	4	–	0
Boston University		–		4	–	5	–	0
Buffalo		–		4	–	5	–	0
Bridgeport		–		4	–	5	–	0
Norwich		–		3	–	4	–	1
Worcester Tech		–		3	–	4	–	0
Boston College		–		4	–	6	–	0
Union (NY)		–		3	–	5	–	0
Pittsburgh		–		3	–	7	–	0
Nichols		–		2	–	3	–	0
Trenton State		–		1	–	6	–	0
King's (PA)		–		1	–	8	–	0
Springfield		–		0	–	7	–	1
Brockport		–		0	–	7	–	0
RPI		–		0	–	7	–	0
Hobart		–		0	–	8	–	0
Rankings from AP Poll

The 1961 Boston University Terriers football team was an American football team that represented Boston University as an independent during the 1961 college football season. In their fifth season under head coach Steve Sinko, the Terriers compiled a 4–5 record and were outscored by a total of 142 to 100.

Quarterback Jack Farland led the team in passing (543 yards), total offense (706 yards), and scoring (30 points).

The team played its home games at Boston University Field in Boston.

== Schedule ==
Date	Opponent	Site	Result	Attendance	Source
September 23	Buffalo	Boston University Field; Boston, MA	L 12–24	11,500	
September 30	at Army	Michie Stadium; West Point, NY	L 7–31	16,250	
October 6	Penn State	Boston University Field; Boston, MA	L 0–32	10,150	
October 14	Holy Cross	Boston University Field; Boston, MA	L 7–20	10,000	
October 21	West Virginia	Boston University Field; Boston, MA	W 12–6	7,100	
October 27	at George Washington	District of Columbia Stadium; Washington, DC	W 20–6	7,800	
November 4	at UMass	Alumni Field; Amherst, MA	W 21–7	6,632	
November 11	Connecticut	Boston University Field; Boston, MA	W 14–6	8,000	
November 18	Boston College^{†}	Boston University Field; Boston, MA (rivalry)	L 7–10	19,600	
^{†}Homecoming

== Statistics ==
The Terriers tallied an average of 145.9 rushing yards and 90.4 passing yards per game. On defense, they gave up an average of 184.6 rushing yards and 99.4 passing yards per game.

The team's passing leaders were quarterbacks Jack Farland (47 of 99 passing for 543 yards, three touchdowns and nine interceptions) and Tom Daubney (19 of 40 passing for 258 yards, zero touchdowns and three interceptions).

The team's rushing leaders were fullback Charlie Meadows (318 yards, 79 carries, 4.0 yard average), halfback Joe DiPietro (297 yards, 47 carries, 6.3 yard average), George Byrd (187 yards, 52 carries, 3.6 yard average), Larry Bernstein (184 yards, 50 carries, 3.7 yard average), and Jack Farland (163 yards, 61 carries, 2.7 yard average).

The receiving leaders were halfback Dave Viti (16 receptions, 243 yards, 15.2 yard average) and Larry Bernstein (7 receptions, 85 yards, 12.1 yard average). Quarterback Jack Farland had one reception good for 63 yards and a touchdown.

Jack Farland was also the team's scoring leader with 30 points scored on five rushing touchdowns. Three players (George Byrd, Joe DiPietro, and Larry Bernstein) tallied 12 points each.
