= 1961 Coast Guard Cadets football team =

American college football season

1961 Coast Guard Cadets football
- Conference: Independent
- Record: 4–4
- Head coach: Otto Graham (3rd season)
- Home stadium: Jones Field

1961 Eastern college football independents records
	Conf.			Overall
Team	W	L	T	W		L		T
Middlebury		–		5	–	1	–	1
Villanova		–		8	–	2	–	0
Southern Connecticut State		–		7	–	2	–	0
Alfred		–		6	–	2	–	0
Montclair State		–		6	–	2	–	0
Delaware Valley		–		6	–	2	–	0
No. 17 Penn State		–		8	–	3	–	0
No. 14 Syracuse		–		8	–	3	–	0
Trinity (CT)		–		5	–	2	–	1
Holy Cross		–		7	–	3	–	0
C. W. Post		–		6	–	3	–	0
Army		–		6	–	4	–	0
Merchant Marine		–		6	–	4	–	0
Tufts		–		5	–	3	–	0
Rochester		–		5	–	3	–	0
Hamilton		–		4	–	3	–	0
Cortland State		–		4	–	3	–	0
American International		–		5	–	4	–	0
Colgate		–		5	–	4	–	0
Northeastern		–		4	–	4	–	0
Coast Guard		–		4	–	4	–	0
Ithaca		–		4	–	4	–	0
Boston University		–		4	–	5	–	0
Buffalo		–		4	–	5	–	0
Bridgeport		–		4	–	5	–	0
Norwich		–		3	–	4	–	1
Worcester Tech		–		3	–	4	–	0
Boston College		–		4	–	6	–	0
Union (NY)		–		3	–	5	–	0
Pittsburgh		–		3	–	7	–	0
Nichols		–		2	–	3	–	0
Trenton State		–		1	–	6	–	0
King's (PA)		–		1	–	8	–	0
Springfield		–		0	–	7	–	1
Brockport		–		0	–	7	–	0
RPI		–		0	–	7	–	0
Hobart		–		0	–	8	–	0
Rankings from AP Poll

The 1961 Coast Guard Cadets football team was an American football team that represented the United States Coast Guard Academy at New London, Connecticut, as an independent during the 1961 college football season. In their third year under head coach Otto Graham, the Cadets compiled a 4–4 record.

Guard James Lightner received third-team honors on the 1961 Little All-America college football team.

== Schedule ==
Date	Opponent	Site	Result	Attendance	Source
September 30	at Vermont	Centennial Field; Burlington, VT	L 8–28	4,800	
October 7	Norwich	Jones Field; New London, CT	L 6–7		
October 14	at Wesleyan	Middletown, CT	W 13–9	3,000	
October 21	Amherst	Jones Field; New London, CT	L 7–40	2,500–2,700	
October 28	Worcester Tech	Jones Field; New London, CT	W 21–14	3,500	
November 4	Trinity (CT)	Jones Field; New London, CT	W 20–12	3,500	
November 11	at RPI	'86 Field; Troy, NY	W 13–0	1,000	
November 18	at Tufts	Tufts Oval; Medford, MA	L 8–22	5,500	
