= 1961 Merchant Marine Mariners football team =

American college football season

1961 Merchant Marine Mariners football

Little Army-Navy Game, L 14–35 vs. Pennsylvania Military
- Conference: Independent
- Record: 6–4
- Head coach: Harry Wright (4th season)
- Home stadium: Tomb Memorial Field

1961 Eastern college football independents records
	Conf.			Overall
Team	W	L	T	W		L		T
Middlebury		–		5	–	1	–	1
Villanova		–		8	–	2	–	0
Southern Connecticut State		–		7	–	2	–	0
Alfred		–		6	–	2	–	0
Montclair State		–		6	–	2	–	0
Delaware Valley		–		6	–	2	–	0
No. 17 Penn State		–		8	–	3	–	0
No. 14 Syracuse		–		8	–	3	–	0
Trinity (CT)		–		5	–	2	–	1
Holy Cross		–		7	–	3	–	0
C. W. Post		–		6	–	3	–	0
Army		–		6	–	4	–	0
Merchant Marine		–		6	–	4	–	0
Tufts		–		5	–	3	–	0
Rochester		–		5	–	3	–	0
Hamilton		–		4	–	3	–	0
Cortland State		–		4	–	3	–	0
American International		–		5	–	4	–	0
Colgate		–		5	–	4	–	0
Northeastern		–		4	–	4	–	0
Coast Guard		–		4	–	4	–	0
Ithaca		–		4	–	4	–	0
Boston University		–		4	–	5	–	0
Buffalo		–		4	–	5	–	0
Bridgeport		–		4	–	5	–	0
Norwich		–		3	–	4	–	1
Worcester Tech		–		3	–	4	–	0
Boston College		–		4	–	6	–	0
Union (NY)		–		3	–	5	–	0
Pittsburgh		–		3	–	7	–	0
Nichols		–		2	–	3	–	0
Trenton State		–		1	–	6	–	0
King's (PA)		–		1	–	8	–	0
Springfield		–		0	–	7	–	1
Brockport		–		0	–	7	–	0
RPI		–		0	–	7	–	0
Hobart		–		0	–	8	–	0
Rankings from AP Poll

The 1961 Merchant Marine Mariners football team, also known as Kings Point, was an American football team that represented the United States Merchant Marine Academy at Kings Point, New York, during the 1961 college football season. In their fourth season under head coach Harry Wright, the Mariners compiled a 6–4 record.

The team played its home games at Tomb Memorial Field.

== Schedule ==
Date	Opponent	Rank	Site	Result	Attendance	Source
September 16	at Central Connecticut State		Arute Field; New Britain, CT	W 26–6	2,000	
September 23	at Temple		Temple Stadium; Philadelphia, PA	W 12–0	3,500–5,000	
September 30	at Upsala		East Orange, NJ	W 21–7	3,000	
October 7	Wagner		Tomb Memorial Field; Kings Point, NY	W 19–16	4,500	
October 14	at No. 19 Lehigh		Taylor Stadium; Bethlehem, PA	L 6–20	6,000	
October 21	No. 8 Hofstra		Tomb Memorial Field; Kings Point, NY	L 7–8	4,500–5,000	
October 28	at New Hampshire		Cowell Stadium; Durham, NH	L 7–8	4,000–5,000	
November 4	at Muhlenberg		Muhlenberg Field; Allentown, PA	W 43–42	5,000	
November 18	Bridgeport		Tomb Memorial Field; Kings Point, NY	W 21–8	5,500	
December 2	vs. Pennsylvania Military		Convention Hall; Atlantic City, NJ (Little Army-Navy Game)	L 14–35	9,300–13,000	
Rankings from UPI Poll released prior to the game
