= 1961 Middlebury Panthers football team =

American college football season

1961 Middlebury Panthers football
- Conference: Independent
- Record: 5–1–1
- Head coach: Duke Nelson (16th season)
- Captain: Porter Field

1961 Eastern college football independents records
	Conf.			Overall
Team	W	L	T	W		L		T
Middlebury		–		5	–	1	–	1
Villanova		–		8	–	2	–	0
Southern Connecticut State		–		7	–	2	–	0
Alfred		–		6	–	2	–	0
Montclair State		–		6	–	2	–	0
Delaware Valley		–		6	–	2	–	0
No. 17 Penn State		–		8	–	3	–	0
No. 14 Syracuse		–		8	–	3	–	0
Trinity (CT)		–		5	–	2	–	1
Holy Cross		–		7	–	3	–	0
C. W. Post		–		6	–	3	–	0
Army		–		6	–	4	–	0
Merchant Marine		–		6	–	4	–	0
Tufts		–		5	–	3	–	0
Rochester		–		5	–	3	–	0
Hamilton		–		4	–	3	–	0
Cortland State		–		4	–	3	–	0
American International		–		5	–	4	–	0
Colgate		–		5	–	4	–	0
Northeastern		–		4	–	4	–	0
Coast Guard		–		4	–	4	–	0
Ithaca		–		4	–	4	–	0
Boston University		–		4	–	5	–	0
Buffalo		–		4	–	5	–	0
Bridgeport		–		4	–	5	–	0
Norwich		–		3	–	4	–	1
Worcester Tech		–		3	–	4	–	0
Boston College		–		4	–	6	–	0
Union (NY)		–		3	–	5	–	0
Pittsburgh		–		3	–	7	–	0
Nichols		–		2	–	3	–	0
Trenton State		–		1	–	6	–	0
King's (PA)		–		1	–	8	–	0
Springfield		–		0	–	7	–	1
Brockport		–		0	–	7	–	0
RPI		–		0	–	7	–	0
Hobart		–		0	–	8	–	0
Rankings from AP Poll

The 1961 Middlebury Panthers football team was an American football team that represented Middlebury College as an independent during the 1961 college football season. In their 16th year under head coach Duke Nelson, the Panthers compiled a 5–1–1 record and outscored opponents by a total of 106 to 72. The Panthers took the Vermont state football championship for the fourth time in six years.

The team tallied 1,352 yards of total offense (193 yards per game), consisting of 826 rushing yards and 526 passing yards. On defense, the team allowed 1,308 yards by opponents (187 yards per game), consisting of 1,005 rushing yards and 303 passing yards.

Quarterback duties were split between Kernan "Kernie" Claflin (24 of 49 passing for 277 yards) and Christopher Morse (15 of 43 for 232 yards). Claflin also led the team with 411 yards of total offense. Fullback Gordon Van Nes led the team in rushing (228 yards) and scoring (36 points). Right end Gilbert Owren was the leading receiver with 15 catches for 196 yards; Owren was also the team's second leading scorer with 28 points.

Five Middlebury players were selected by WCAX-TV (Burlington) as first-team players on its 1961 all-state football team: Kernie Claflin; Jim Shattuck; Gordie Van Nes; Gil Owren; and Paul Fava. Duke Nelson was also named Coach of the year for the third consecutive year.

== Schedule ==
Date	Opponent	Site	Result	Attendance	Source
September 30	at Wesleyan	Andrus Field; Middletown, CT	W 20–14	3,200	
October 7	at Worcester Tech	Worcester, MA	W 6–2	3,100–3,700	
October 14	Williams^{†}	Porter Field; Middlebury, VT	L 0–12	2,000	
October 21	Bates	Porter Field; Middlebury, VT	T 20–20	3,500	
October 28	at RPI	'86 Field; Troy, NY	W 20–6	2,800	
November 4	at Norwich	Sabine Field; Northfield, VT	W 13–12	2,500	
November 11	Vermont	Porter Field; Middlebury, VT	W 27–6	3,200–4,500	
^{†}Homecoming
