= Carl Davis (disambiguation) =

Carl Davis (1936–2023) was an American-born composer and conductor based in Britain.

Carl Davis may also refer to:

- Carl Davis (music producer) (1934–2012), American record producer
- Carl Davis (boxer) (born 1973), American cruiserweight and heavyweight boxer
- Carl Davis (American football, born 1992), American football player
- Carl Davis (American football, born 1903) (1903–1959), American football player
- Carl Raymond Davis (1911–1940), South African-born flying ace
- Carl A. Davis (fl. 1922–1962), American football, basketball, and baseball coach

== See also ==
- Carl Davis Drumond (born 1975), Costa Rican heavyweight boxer
- Carl Davies (born 1964), British biathlete
- Carol Davis (disambiguation)
- Karl Davis (1962–1987), African-American fashion designer
- Karl Davis (wrestler) (1908–1977), American professional wrestler and actor
