= 1961 Williams Ephs football team =

American college football season

1961 Williams Ephs football

Little Three champion
- Conference: Little Three Conference
- Record: 6–2 (2–0 Little Three)
- Head coach: Len Watters (14th season)
- Home stadium: Weston Field

The 1961 Williams Ephs football team was an American football team that represented Williams College as a member of the Little Three Conference during the 1961 college football season. In their 14th year under head coach Len Watters, the Lord Jeffs compiled a 6–2 record (2–0 in conference games) and won the Little Three championship.

Quarterback Bruce Grinnell led the team with 388 passing yards and 538 yards of total offense. Halfback Tom Todd led the team in rushing with 247 yards on 60 carries. Center Michael Reilly received third-team honors on the 1961 Little All-America college football team.

== Schedule ==
Date	Opponent	Site	Result	Attendance	Source
September 30	Trinity (CT)*	Weston Field; Williamstown, MA	L 6–8	4,500	
October 7	at Springfield*	Pratt Field; Springfield, MA	W 18–7	1,500	
October 14	at Middlebury*	Porter Field; Middlebury, VT	W 12–0	2,000	
October 21	Bowdoin*	Weston Field; Williamstown, MA	W 9–3	4,000	
October 28	at Tufts*	Tufts Oval; Medford, MA	L 0–14	5,500–5,700	
November 4	Union (NY)*	Weston Field; Williamstown, MA	W 22–0	2,200	
November 11	Wesleyan	Andrus Field; Middletown, CT	W 14–0	5,200–5,300	
November 18	Amherst	Weston Field; Williamstown, MA (The Biggest Little Game in America)	W 12–0	7,500–10,000	
*Non-conference game
