= Carol Davis =

Carol Davis may refer to:

- Carol Davis (American football) (1932–2025), owner of the Las Vegas Raiders
- Carol Anne Davis (born 1961), Scottish crime novelist and writer on crime
- Carol Rymer Davis (1944–2010), American balloonist and radiologist

== See also ==
- Carole Davis (born 1958), English-American actress, model, singer/songwriter and writer
- Carl Davis (disambiguation)
