= 1961 Wesleyan Cardinals football team =

American college football season

1961 Wesleyan Cardinals football
- Conference: Little Three
- Record: 1–7 (0–2 Little Three)
- Head coach: Norm Daniels (17th season)
- Home stadium: Andrus Field

The 1961 Wesleyan Cardinals football team, also known as the Wesleyan Methodists, was an American football that represented Wesleyan University as a member of the Little Three during the 1961 college football season. In their 17th season under head coach Norm Daniels, the Cardinals compiled a 1–7 record (0–2 in conference games) and were outscored by a total of 209 to 86.

The team played its home games at Andrus Field in Middletown, Connecticut.

== Schedule ==
Date	Opponent	Site	Result	Attendance	Source
September 30	Middlebury*	Andrus Field; Middletown, CT	L 14–20	3,877	
October 7	at Bowdoin*	Brunswick, ME	L 0–27	5,000	
October 14	Coast Guard*	Andrus Field; Middletown, CT	L 9–13	3,000	
October 21	at Worcester Tech*	Alumni Stadium; Worcester, MA	L 20–21	3,000–3,500	
October 28	at Amherst	Pratt Field; Amherst, MA	L 8–48	5,000–6,000	
November 4	Hamilton*	Andrus Field; Middletown, CT	W 21–20	3,000	
November 11	Williams	Andrus Field; Middletown, CT	L 0–14	4,000–5,300	
November 18	at Trinity (CT)*	Trinity Field; Hartford, CT (rivalry)	L 14–42	6,500	
*Non-conference game

== Statistics ==
The 1961 Wesleyan Cardinals tallied 1,396 yards of total offense (178.5 per game), consisting of 877 rushing yards (110 per game) and 519 passing yards (65 per game). On defense, the Cardinals gave up 2,051 yards by opponents (257 per game), including 1,025 rushing yards (128 per game) and 1,032 passing yards (129 per game).

The team's rushing leaders were fullback Dave Snyder with 218 rushing yards on 96 carries and halfback Jim Fergeson with 205 yards on 41 carries. Snyder also led the team in scoring with 18 points on three touchdowns.

The team's passing leaders were quarterbacks John Driscoll (34-for-81, 318 yards, four touchdowns, six interceptions) and steve Humphrey (8-for-40, 166 yards, one touchdown, two interceptions). End John Buttles was the leading receiver with eight catches for 168 yards and one touchdown.

Halfback Jim Matteson led the team in punting with 26 punts for 978 yards, an average of 37.6 yards per punt.
