= 1961 Amherst Lord Jeffs football team =

American college football season

1961 Amherst Lord Jeffs football
- Conference: Little Three Conference
- Record: 7–1 (1–1 Little Three)
- Head coach: Jim Ostendarp (3rd season)
- Home stadium: Pratt Field

The 1961 Amherst Lord Jeffs football team was an American football team that represented Amherst College as a member of the Little Three Conference during the 1961 college football season. In their third year under head coach Jim Ostendarp, the Lord Jeffs compiled a 7–1 record and outscored by a total of 229 to 61. The team played home games at Pratt Field in Amherst, Massachusetts.

Tackle Paul Abodeely received third-team honors on the 1961 Little All-America college football team.

== Schedule ==
Date	Opponent	Site	Result	Attendance	Source
September 30	at Springfield*	Pratt Field; Springfield, MA	W 24–0	1,500–2,000	
October 7	American International*	Pratt Field; Amherst, MA	W 28–14	1,200–2,000	
October 14	Bowdoin*	Pratt Field; Amherst, MA	W 27–6	500	
October 21	at Coast Guard*	Jones Field; New London, CT	W 40–7	2,500–2,700	
October 28	Wesleyan	Pratt Field; Amherst, MA	W 48–8	5,000–6,000	
November 4	at Tufts*	Tufts Oval; Medford, MA	W 40–6	7,500–8,000	
November 11	Trinity (CT)*	Pratt Field; Amherst, MA	W 22–8	6,300	
November 18	at Williams	Weston Field; Williamstown, MA (The Biggest Little Game in America)	L 0–12	7,500–10,000	
*Non-conference game
