= Harry Arlanson =

American football and baseball coach (1909–1998)

Biographical details
- Born: May 4, 1909; Lynn, Massachusetts, U.S.
- Died: March 21, 1998 (aged 88); East Dennis, Massachusetts, U.S.

Playing career

Football
- 1927–1930: Tufts

Baseball
- 1928–1931: Tufts

Coaching career (HC unless noted)

Football
- 1935–1953: Weymouth HS (MA)
- 1954–1965: Tufts

Baseball
- 1936–1954: Weymouth HS (MA)

Head coaching record
- Overall: 57–35–2 (college football); 135–19–10 (high school football)

Harry Arlanson (May 4, 1909 – March 21, 1998) was an American football and baseball coach. He served as the head football coach at Tufts University from 1954 to 1965, compiling a record of 57–35–2. Arlanson coached football and baseball at Weymouth High School in Weymouth, Massachusetts from 1935 to 1954. His football teams at Weymouth had a record of 135–19–10.

== Playing career ==
Arlanson played both football and baseball at Tufts, and was captain of both teams, graduating in 1931. As a player, Arlanson's Tufts teams never posted a losing record. While at Tufts, he played summer baseball for Orleans in the Cape Cod Baseball League in 1929 and 1930, catching for an Orleans team that was managed by former Boston Red Sox skipper Patsy Donovan.

== Head coaching record ==
=== College football ===
Year	Team	Overall	Conference	Standing	Bowl/playoffs
Tufts Jumbos (NCAA College Division independent) (1954–1965)
1954	Tufts	6–2			
1955	Tufts	5–2			
1956	Tufts	6–1			
1957	Tufts	6–1–1			
1958	Tufts	6–2			
1959	Tufts	5–2–1			
1960	Tufts	7–1			
1961	Tufts	5–3			
1962	Tufts	5–3			
1963	Tufts	2–6			
1964	Tufts	3–5			
1965	Tufts	1–7			
Tufts:		57–35–2			
Total:		57–35–2			
