= Gayton Salvucci =

American football coach (1928–1998)

Biographical details
- Born: May 8, 1928; Quincy, Massachusetts, U.S.
- Died: August 2, 1998 (aged 70); Hampden, Massachusetts, U.S.
- Education: American International College (1953)

Playing career

Football
- 1949–1952: American International
- 1953: Green Bay Packers
- 1954: Fort Dix
- 1955: Green Bay Packers

Baseball
- 1949–1952: American International
- Positions: Halfback (football); Center fielder (baseball)

Coaching career (HC unless noted)

Football
- 1954: Fort Dix
- 1956–1970: American International
- 1971–1974: Holy Cross (backfield)

Head coaching record
- Overall: 57–79–6

Gayton William Salvucci (May 8, 1928 – August 2, 1998) is an American college football coach. He was the head football coach for American International College from 1956 to 1970. He also coached for Fort Dix and Holy Cross. He played college football for American International as a halfback and professionally for the Green Bay Packers of the National Football League (NFL).

== Head coaching record ==
Year	Team	Overall	Conference	Standing	Bowl/playoffs
Fort Dix Burros (Independent) (1954)
1954	Fort Dix	8–1–1			
Fort Dix:		8–1–1			
American International Yellow Jackets (Independent) (1956–1970)
1956	American International	4–4–1			
1957	American International	4–5			
1958	American International	3–4–1			
1959	American International	6–3			
1960	American International	3–5			
1961	American International	5–4			
1962	American International	4–5			
1963	American International	1–8			
1964	American International	3–5–1			
1965	American International	0–9			
1966	American International	1–8			
1967	American International	6–3			
1968	American International	3–4–1			
1969	American International	4–5			
1970	American International	2–6–1			
American International:		49–78–5			
Total:		57–79–6			
