= Len Watters =

American football player and coach (1898–1986)

Biographical details
- Born: June 4, 1898; Dubuque, Iowa, U.S.
- Died: December 1986 (aged 88)

Playing career
- c. 1921: Springfield
- 1924: Buffalo Bisons
- Position: End

Coaching career (HC unless noted)
- 1930–1947: White Plains HS (NY)
- 1948–1962: Williams

Head coaching record
- Overall: 68–47 (college)

Leonard Alvyn Watters (June 4, 1898 – December 1986) was an American football player and coach.

Watters was born in Dubuque, Iowa and attended Central High School in South Bend, Indiana, and Springfield College in Springfield, Massachusetts. He played professional football for the Buffalo Bisons in the 1924 NFL season, appearing in eight games for the Bisons. Watters spent 42 years as a coach, including 15 years as the head football coach for Williams College from 1948 to 1962. He compiled a record of 68–47 at Williams and ranks fourth in career wins among Williams Ephs football coaches.
