= Roy Ilowit =

American football player and coach (1917–1990)

Biographical details
- Born: April 3, 1917; New York City, U.S.
- Died: January 3, 1990 (aged 72); Dade County, Florida, U.S.

Playing career
- 1934–1936: CCNY
- 1937: Brooklyn Dodgers
- Position: Tackle

Coaching career (HC unless noted)
- 1957–1963: C. W. Post

Head coaching record
- Overall: 31–31

Roy K. Ilowit (April 3, 1917 – January 3, 1990) was an American football player and coach. He played professionally as a tackle in the National Football League (NFL) for one season, in 1937, with the Brooklyn Dodgers Ilowit served as the head football coach at C. W. Post—now known as LIU Post—from 1957 to 1963, compiling a record of 31–31.

== Head coaching record ==
Year	Team	Overall	Conference	Standing	Bowl/playoffs
C. W. Post Pioneers (NCAA College Division independent) (1957–1963)
1957	C. W. Post	3–5			
1958	C. W. Post	4–5			
1959	C. W. Post	4–5			
1960	C. W. Post	4–5			
1961	C. W. Post	6–3			
1962	C. W. Post	4–5			
1963	C. W. Post	6–3			
C. W. Post:		31–31			
Total:		31–31			
