= Ed Hoffman =

American football coach

Biographical details
- Died: October 30, 2014; Troy, New York, U.S.
- Education: Springfield

Coaching career (HC unless noted)
- 1957: RPI (assistant)
- 1958–1962: RPI

Administrative career (AD unless noted)
- 1963–1988: Briarcliff HS (NY)

Head coaching record
- Overall: 3–35

Edward J. Hoffman (? – October 30, 2014) was an American college football coach. He served as the head football coach at Rensselaer Polytechnic Institute (RPI) in Troy, New York from 1958 to 1962 compiling a record of 3–35. Hoffman was the athletic director at Briarcliff High School in Briarcliff Manor, New York from 1963 to 1988. His grandson also named Edward J. Hoffman currently attends Kenston High School in Bainbridge Township, Geauga County, Ohio.
