= Carl A. Davis =

American football, basketball, and baseball coach

Playing career

Football
- 1922–1925: SW Missouri State

Basketball
- 1922–1926: SW Missouri State
- Position: Halfback (football)

Coaching career (HC unless noted)

Football
- 1928–1929: Catawba
- 1932–1962: Cortland

Basketball
- 1928–1931: Catawba
- 1938–1950: Cortland

Baseball
- 1929–1932: Catawba
- 1933–1957: Cortland

Head coaching record
- Overall: 112–75–19 (football); 30–31 (basketball)

Carl Aaron "Chugger" Davis was an American football, basketball, and baseball coach. He began his coaching career as the head football coach (1928–1929), men's basketball coach (1928–1931), and baseball coach (1929–1932) at Catawba College in Salisbury, North Carolina.

Davis later served as the head football coach (1932–1942, 1946–1962) and head baseball coach (1933–1957) at Cortland Normal School–now State University of New York College at Cortland.
