= Sprague Field =

Stadium at Montclair State University

Coordinates: 40.8586°N 74.2012°W

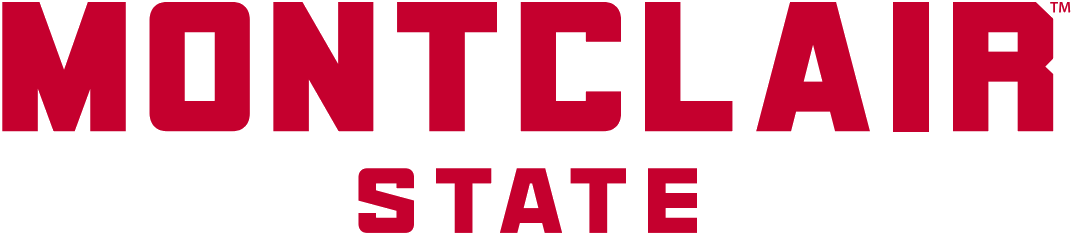
- Interactive map of Sprague Field
- Address: Montclair, NJ; U.S.
- Owner: Montclair State University
- Operator: Montclair State Athletics
- Capacity: 6,000
- Type: Stadium
- Surface: Artificial turf
- Current use: Football; Field hockey Lacrosse

Construction
- Opened: 1930s

Tenants
- Montclair State Red Hawks teams: football, field hockey, lacrosse

Website
- montclairathletics.com/sprague-field

Sprague Field is a 6,000-seat stadium located on the campus of Montclair State University in Montclair, New Jersey, USA. The stadium is located on the Normal Avenue side of the campus adjacent to the university's major indoor sporting venue, the Panzer Athletic Center, and is within walking distance of the Montclair Heights rail station.

Sprague Field is one of several athletic venues on campus and plays host to the Montclair State Red Hawks football team, its field hockey team, and its men's and women's lacrosse teams. At various times, it played host to the baseball, track, and soccer squads as well. The soccer team now plays at MSU Soccer Park at Pittser Field while the baseball team, which called Pittser home before its conversion, play at Yogi Berra Stadium on the opposite side of the campus.

== History ==
The stadium was built in the 1930s, and originally used for the Montclair State baseball and track and field teams. Sprague Field was the site of the first ever college football game in New Jersey to be played at night, which took place on October 3, 1941 and pitted the Red Hawks, then known as the Indians, against Hofstra University. The stadium has had an artificial surface since 1979, first AstroTurf and since 2006 FieldTurf.
