= Bridgeport Purple Knights =

- University: University of Bridgeport
- Nickname: Purple Knights
- NCAA: Division II
- Conference: CACC (primary)
- Athletic director: Anthony Vitti
- Location: Bridgeport, Connecticut
- Varsity teams: 14 (6 men's, 8 women's)
- Basketball arena: Harvey Hubbell Gymnasium
- Baseball stadium: Seaside Park
- Softball stadium: Seaside Park Softball Complex
- Soccer stadium: Knights Field
- Lacrosse stadium: Knights Field
- Colors: Purple and white
- Website: www.ubknights.com
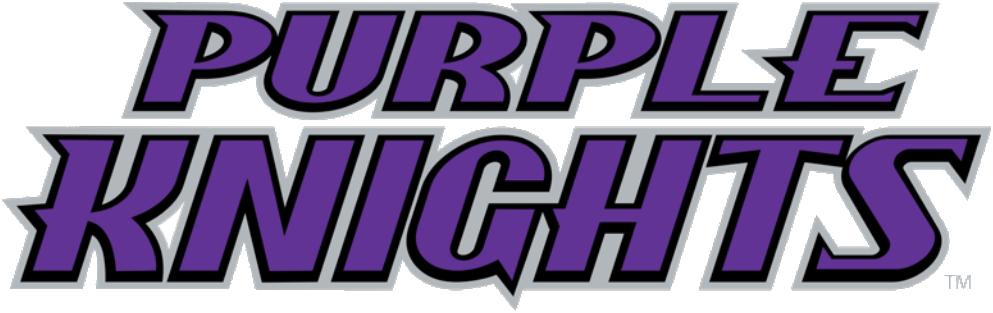

Team NCAA championships
- 1

The Bridgeport Purple Knights are the athletic teams that represent the University of Bridgeport, located in Bridgeport, Connecticut, in NCAA Division II intercollegiate sports. The Purple Knights compete as members of the Central Atlantic Collegiate Conference for most sports.

Knights Field is a 950-seat multipurpose stadium located in Bridgeport, Connecticut. It is primarily used as the soccer and lacrosse stadium of the Purple Knights.

== Varsity teams ==
Men's sports	Women's sports
Baseball	Basketball
Basketball	Cross country
Cross country	Gymnastics
Lacrosse	Lacrosse
Soccer	Soccer
Track and field^{1}	Softball
	Volleyball
	Track and field^{1}
^{1} – includes both, indoor and outdoor

== Individual sports ==
=== Gymnastics ===
In 2012, The University of Bridgeport women's gymnastics team won their fourth straight USA Gymnastics Collegiate National Championships. Also, in 2013 UB women's gymnastics team won their fifth consecutive USA Gymnastics Collegiate National Championship.

=== Soccer ===
Seth Roland was head coach of the soccer team from 1987 to 1992.

== National championships ==
=== Team ===
Association	Division	Sport	Year	Opponent/Runner-up	Score
NCAA	Division II	Women's Soccer	2018	Grand Valley State	1–0

== Notable alumni ==
=== Baseball ===
- John Papa - pitcher, Baltimore Orioles
- Phil Nastu - pitcher, San Francisco Giants
- Tom Shopay - outfielder, New York Yankees, Baltimore Orioles

=== Basketball ===
- Manute Bol - center, Washington Bullets, tied with Gheorghe Mureșan as the tallest player in the history of the NBA

=== Football ===
- George Dixon - running back, Montreal Alouettes, member of the Canadian Football Hall of Fame
- Andy Robustelli - defensive end, Los Angeles Rams and New York Giants, member of the Pro Football Hall of Fame
- Allan Webb - defensive back/halfback, New York Giants
