= TCNJ Lions =

- University: The College of New Jersey
- Nickname: Lions
- NCAA: Division III
- Conference: NJAC
- Athletic director: Liz Shatkus
- Location: Ewing, New Jersey
- Varsity teams: 11 men's, 11 women's
- Football stadium: Lions Stadium
- Basketball arena: Packer Hall
- Baseball stadium: George Ackerman Park
- Softball stadium: Dr. June Walker Field
- Soccer stadium: TCNJ Soccer Complex
- Aquatics center: TCNJ Aquatic Center
- Colors
- Mascot: Roscoe the Lion
- Website: tcnjathletics.com
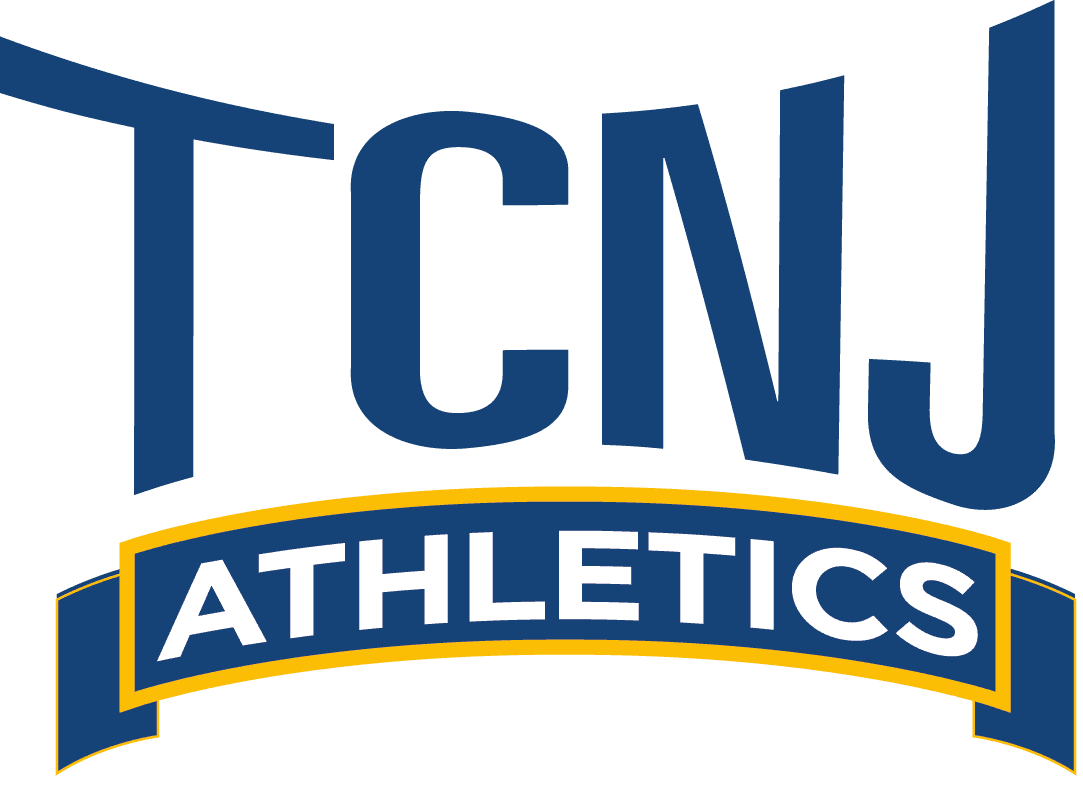

The TCNJ Lions are the athletic teams representing The College of New Jersey (TCNJ). They are a member of the New Jersey Athletic Conference (NJAC) and compete within Division III of the National Collegiate Athletic Association (NCAA).

== Overview ==
In 1957, TCNJ, then known as Trenton State College, was a founding member of the NJAC (then called the New Jersey State Athletic Conference) along with five other state institutions. Since then, and after the conference allowed women's sports in 1985, the school has been a powerhouse winning the most titles in men's cross country, women's cross country, field hockey, women's tennis, women's soccer.

The school fields 11 varsity sports teams for men and women each and has captured 44 team national championships, as well as more than 40 individual and relay national championships, across multiple programs. The school's two most successful are the Women's Lacrosse team with 12 NCAA Division III Championships and the Women's Field Hockey team with 11 Division III NCAA Championships, the most of any team in D-III for either sport.

== Varsity sports ==
TCNJ's varsity teams are the top combined first- and second-place finishers of all 424 Division III schools in the nation over more than 25 years.

Men's sports	Women's sports
Baseball	Basketball
Basketball	Cross country
Cross country	Field hockey
Football	Lacrosse
Soccer	Soccer
Swimming	Softball
Tennis	Swimming
Track and field	Tennis
Wrestling	Track and field
^{1} – includes both indoor and outdoor

=== Lacrosse ===
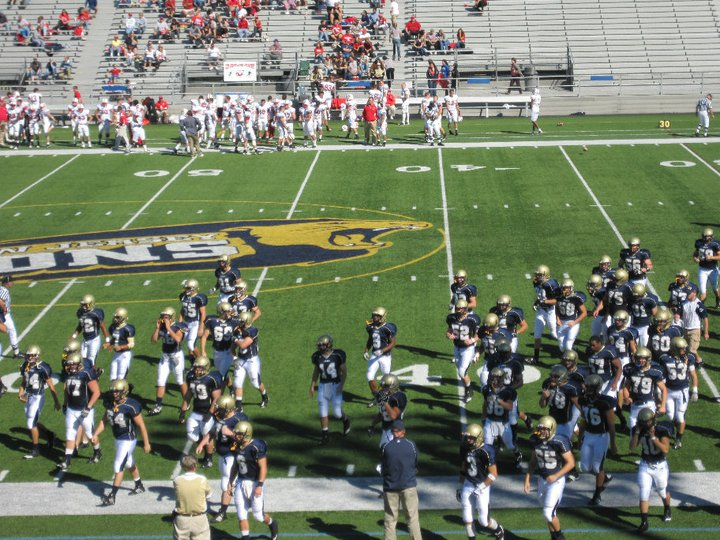
TCNJ football at the Lions Stadium

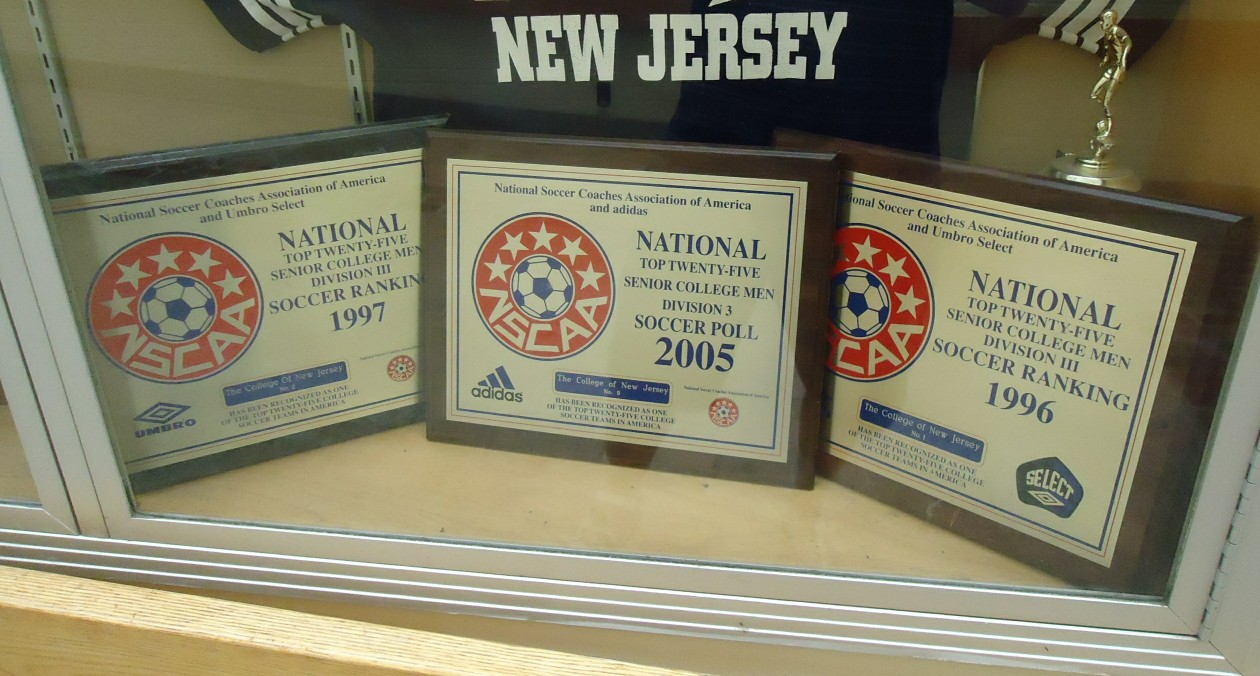
Soccer awards won by TCNJ

The women's lacrosse team has played in the championship game 16 out of 20 possible times, winning 11 (though the 1992 title was later vacated) and qualifying for the NCAA tournament 21 consecutive times through 2005, highlighted by a 93–1 record from 1991 to 1996. The women's field hockey team has won 10 Division III crowns in 14 championship appearances (both twice as many as any other school).

=== Soccer ===
The TCNJ men's soccer team won the 1996 National Championship and was the National Championship Runner-up in 1997. TCNJ was also a National Championship Finalist in 1991 and Final Four participant in 1994.

=== Track and field ===
The track and field teams have especially dominated the NJAC since the title was first contested in 1997, winning each year in both indoor and outdoor.

In 2017–18, TCNJ captured its first NJAC cup, after claiming titles in women’s cross country, field hockey, women’s tennis, women’s indoor track & field, and women’s lacrosse, and NJAC regular season titles in softball and baseball.

=== Wrestling ===
The TCNJ wrestling team has placed in the top 20 nationally for 30 consecutive years, including 5 national championships (1979, 1981, 1984, 1985, 1987), 5 runner-up finishes, and numerous finishes in the top 5.

== Varsity championships ==
=== National and NCAA championships ===
Source: List of individual TCNJ national champions

Sport	Titles	Winning years
Field Hockey	11	1981, 1983, 1985, 1988, 1990, 1991, 1995, 1996, 1999, 2011, 2014
Lacrosse (women's)	14	1981 (AIAW), 1985, 1987, 1988, 1991, 1992^{1}, 1993, 1994, 1995, 1996, 1998, 2000, 2005, 2006
Soccer (men's)	3	1964 (NAIA), 1965 (NAIA), 1996
Soccer (women's)	3	1993, 1994, 2000
Softball	6	1983, 1987, 1989, 1992, 1994, 1996
Tennis (women's)	1	1986
Wrestling	5	1979, 1981, 1984, 1985, 1987

- ^{1}The NCAA vacated the 1992 Women's Lacrosse title due to use of an ineligible player during the tournament

=== Conference championships ===
New Jersey Athletic Conference (NJAC) championships
Sport	Titles	Winning years
Baseball	11	1960, 1961, 1981, 2000, 2005, 2006, 2007, 2009, 2017, 2019, 2023
Basketball (men's)	6	1967, 1989, 1998, 2020, 2024, 2026
Basketball (women's)	5	2001, 2004, 2006, 2009, 2026
Cross Country (men's)	32	1965, 1967, 1968, 1969, 1991, 1994, 1995, 1996, 1997, 1998, 1999, 2000, 2001, 2002, 2003, 2004, 2005, 2006, 2007, 2008, 2009, 2010, 2011, 2012, 2013, 2014, 2015, 2016, 2018, 2020, 2021, 2025
Cross Country (women's)	35	1981, 1982, 1983, 1984, 1985, 1986, 1987, 1988, 1989, 1990, 1991, 1995, 1996, 1997, 1998, 1999, 2000, 2001, 2002, 2003, 2004, 2005, 2006, 2007, 2008, 2009, 2010, 2013, 2014, 2015, 2017, 2018, 2020-21, 2022, 2023
Field Hockey	26	1985, 1986, 1987, 1988, 1989, 1990, 1991, 1992, 1993, 1994, 1995, 1996, 1997, 1999, 2001, 2004, 2006, 2007, 2008, 2010, 2011, 2014, 2015, 2016, 2017, 2019
Football	8	1980, 1983, 1988, 1990, 1994, 1996, 1998, 2007
Lacrosse (women's)	16	2009, 2011, 2012, 2013, 2014, 2015, 2016, 2017, 2018, 2019, 2021, 2022, 2023, 2024, 2025, 2026
Soccer (men's)	15	1959, 1960, 1962, 1963, 1964, 1965, 1966, 1967, 1969, 1970, 1974, 1976, 1981, 1994, 2005
Soccer (women's)	22	1994, 1995, 1996, 1997, 1999, 2000, 2001, 2002, 2003, 2005, 2006, 2007, 2009, 2010, 2011, 2013, 2017, 2018, 2019, 2021, 2023, 2024
Softball	13	1985, 1986, 1987, 1988, 1991, 1992, 1993, 1995, 1996, 2000, 2019, 2021, 2023
Swimming (men's)	15	1994, 1995, 2009, 2010, 2011, 2012, 2013, 2014, 2015, 2016, 2021, 2023, 2024, 2025, 2026
Swimming (women's)	16	1987, 1988, 1989, 1990, 2000, 2001, 2002, 2003, 2009, 2010, 2011, 2012, 2013, 2014, 2015, 2016
Tennis (men's)	4	1997, 1998, 2019, 2026
Tennis (women's)	44	1982, 1983, 1984, 1985, 1986, 1987, 1988, 1989, 1990, 1991, 1992, 1993, 1994, 1995, 1996, 1997, 1998, 1999, 2000, 2001, 2002, 2003, 2004, 2005, 2006, 2007, 2008, 2009, 2010, 2011, 2012, 2013, 2014, 2015, 2016, 2017, 2018, 2019, 2021, 2022, 2023, 2024, 2025, 2026
Track & field (men's) –indoor	16	1998, 1999, 2000, 2001, 2002, 2003, 2004, 2005, 2006, 2007, 2008, 2009, 2010, 2011, 2012, 2013
Track & field (men's)	17	1998, 1999, 2000, 2001, 2002, 2003, 2004, 2005, 2006, 2007, 2008, 2009, 2010, 2011, 2012, 2013, 2014
Track & field (women's) –indoor	21	1998, 1999, 2000, 2001, 2002, 2003, 2004, 2005, 2006, 2007, 2008, 2009, 2010, 2011, 2018, 2019, 2020, 2022, 2023, 2024, 2025
Track & field (women's)	26	1985, 1986, 1987, 1988, 1989, 1990, 1991, 1993, 1994, 1995, 1996, 1997, 1998, 1999, 2000, 2001, 2002, 2003, 2004, 2005, 2006, 2007, 2008, 2009, 2010, 2011

== Club sports ==
Outside of varsity athletics the school also hosts 15 club sports including a men's ice hockey team that competes within the American Collegiate Hockey Association (ACHA) at Division I. The team is a member of the Northeast Collegiate Hockey League. Prior to 2022, the team competed in ACHA Division II and won championships in various conferences such as the Great Northeast Collegiate Hockey Conference (2012, 2014) and the Colonial States College Hockey Conference (2017, 2018, 2019, 2020). Following the jump to ACHA Division 1, a second men's ice hockey team was launched which currently competes in the Atlantic Coast Collegiate Hockey League (Men's 2A Tri-State Division).

The TCNJ cheerleading team has found success in the collegiate cheerleading world since its inception in 2000. In 2014, 2015, 2019, and 2020, the program was recognized as National Champions at Universal Cheerleaders Association's College championship.

=== Ice hockey ===
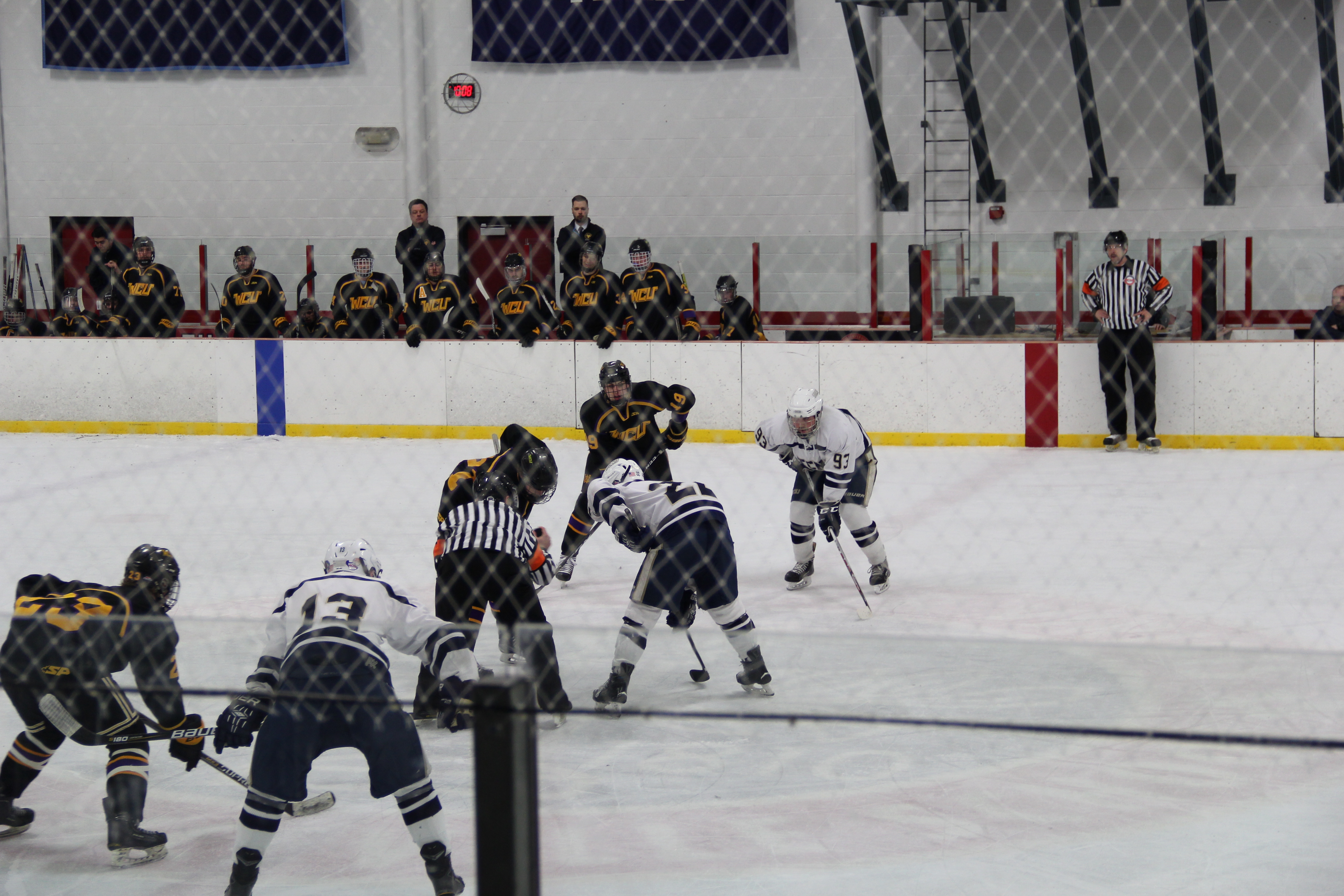
TCNJ vs West Chester in 2018

The school's club ice hockey team have found success as a member of multiple American Collegiate Hockey Association (ACHA) conferences since the group's creation in 1977.

The team currently plays in the Colonial State College Hockey Conference where it began play as a founding member in 2014, has won four conference championships (2017, 2018, 2019, 2020), and earned bids to the ACHA Southeast Regional Tournament. Prior to this as a member of the Great Northeast Collegiate Hockey Conference the team won two conference titles in 2012 and 2014.

In 2026, the ice hockey team won the Crab Pot Tournament, the oldest non-varsity college ice hockey tournament, hosted by United States Naval Academy. The Lions defeated Towson University and the University of Maryland to win the tournament for the first time in program history.

== Facilities ==
The main athletic facility, Lions Stadium, holds 6,000 spectators and is home to the football, field hockey, lacrosse, and intramural teams. The stadium opened in the fall of 1984 and featured the first North American installation of AstroTurf's vertical-drainage system. This system prevents the "duck-pond effect" commonly seen with other artificial surfaces.

In 2008, reports indicated that the turf contained higher-than-acceptable levels of lead and was subsequently removed. Now, the stadium is furnished with Tiger Turf, which is the first installation of the Trophy Turf in the United States. The stadium has hosted multiple NCAA tournaments and championship games, as well as the annual Special Olympics New Jersey and the annual USSBA Central Jersey Regional marching band competition.
