= Thomas Eck =

American football player and coach (1914–1988)

Biographical details
- Born: March 29, 1914; Allentown, Pennsylvania, U.S.
- Died: June 21, 1988 (aged 74); North Port, Florida, U.S.

Playing career
- 1935–1937: Colgate

Coaching career (HC unless noted)
- 1938–1941: Northampton HS (MA)
- 1942–1944: Massachusetts State (line)
- 1945: Massachusetts State
- 1946: Massachusetts State (line)
- 1947–1951: Massachusetts / UMass
- 1952–1955: Thornton Academy (ME)
- 1956–1960: New Bedford HS (MA)
- 1961?–1975: Chelmsford HS (MA)

Administrative career (AD unless noted)
- 1952–1955: Thornton Academy (ME)
- 1961?–1975: Chelmsford HS (MA)

Head coaching record
- Overall: 17–23–4 (college)

Thomas Woodrow Eck (March 29, 1914 – June 21, 1988) was an American football player and coach. He served as the head coach at the University of Massachusetts Amherst—known as Massachusetts State College until 1947—in 1945 and from 1947 to 1951, compiling a record of 17–23–4. He also served as the line coach from 1942 to 1944 and in 1946. Eck was the head coach when the Redmen, not known as the Minutemen until 1972, transitioned from independent status to their first official football conference, the Yankee Conference, in 1947.

Eck played college football for three years at Colgate University, from which he graduated in 1938. After coaching high school football in Massachusetts, he served as a special projects officer in the United States Army Air Forces during World War II. He began his coaching career with Northampton High School, he served that post until 1941. From 1952 to 1955, he coached football at Thornton Academy in Saco, Maine, tallying a mark of 33–4–2 that featured a 24-game winning streak. His teams at Thornton won two Western Maine Conference titles and two State of Maine Class FFF titles. He served as the head football coach for New Bedford High School from 1956 to 1960 and Chelmsford High School until 1975. He retired from coaching in 1975.

Eck had two sons and 3 daughters. His son Thomas W. Eck Jr. who was a Football coach at Weslyan, died on February 27, 1968, from injured sustained in a car crash. Eck Sr., died on June 21, 1988.

== Head coaching record ==
=== College ===
Year	Team	Overall	Conference	Standing	Bowl/playoffs
Massachusetts State Aggies (Independent) (1945)
1945	Massachusetts State	2–1–1			
Massachusetts Statesmen / UMass Redmen (Yankee Conference) (1947–1951)
1947	Massachusetts	3–4–1	0–1–1		
1948	UMass	3–4–1	2–0		
1949	UMass	3–5	1–1		
1950	UMass	3–5	1–1		
1951	UMass	3–4–1	2–0		
UMass:		17–23–4	6–3–1		
Total:		17–23–4			

== See also ==
- List of college football head coaches with non-consecutive tenure
