= Herb Maack =

American football player and coach (1917–2007)

Biographical details
- Born: April 16, 1917; Union City, New Jersey, U.S.
- Died: May 5, 2007 (aged 90); Narragansett, Rhode Island, U.S.

Playing career

Football
- 1939–1941: Columbia
- 1946: Brooklyn Dodgers (AAFC)

Basketball
- 1939–1940: Columbia
- 1941–1942: Columbia
- 1946–1947: Jersey City Atoms
- Position: Tackle (football)

Coaching career (HC unless noted)

Football
- 1946: Columbia (line)
- 1947–1952: Bucknell (line)
- 1953–1955: Rhode Island (line)
- 1956–1960: Rhode Island

Wrestling
- 1947–1953: Bucknell

Head coaching record
- Overall: 17–22–2 (football); 20–21–2 (wrestling)

Accomplishments and honors

Championships
- Football; 1 Yankee Conference (1957)

Herbert Henry Maack (April 16, 1917 – May 5, 2007) was an American football player and coach. He was the head coach of the Rhode Island Rams football team from 1956 through 1960. He compiled a 17–22–2 record and led the Rams to a share of the 1957 Yankee Conference championship.

Maack, a native of West New York, New Jersey, attended the Hun School of Princeton in Princeton for high school and then played football and basketball in college for the Columbia Lions. Maack played professionally for one season (1946) with the now-defunct Brooklyn Dodgers of the All-America Football Conference (AAFC).

Mack served as an officer in the United States Navy during World War II. He won battle stars for his action in New Guinea and the Philippines before he was discharged as a lieutenant commander.

== Head coaching record ==
=== Football ===
Year	Team	Overall	Conference	Standing	Bowl/playoffs
Rhode Island Rams (Yankee Conference) (1956–1960)
1956	Rhode Island	2–6	1–4	6th	
1957	Rhode Island	5–2–1	3–0–1	T–1st	
1958	Rhode Island	4–4	2–2	3rd	
1959	Rhode Island	3–5–1	1–1–1	T–4th	
1960	Rhode Island	3–5	1–4	5th	
Rhode Island:		17–22–2	8–11–2		
Total:		17–22–2			
National championship Conference title Conference division title or championship game berth
