= Hal Kopp =

American football player and coach (1909–1998)

Biographical details
- Born: January 19, 1909
- Died: May 10, 1998 (aged 89); Rhode Island, U.S.

Playing career
- 1932: Western Maryland

Coaching career (HC unless noted)
- 1937–1940: Northeastern (line)
- 1941–1943: Brown (line)
- late 1940s: Harvard (line)
- late 1940s: Yale (line)
- 1950: Rhode Island State
- 1952–1955: Rhode Island
- 1956–1958: BYU
- 1959: Boston University (line)
- 1960: Connecticut (line)
- 1964–1970: Waltham HS (MA)
- 1972–1975: Bentley

Head coaching record
- Overall: 51–39–6 (college)
- Bowls: 0–1

Accomplishments and honors

Championships
- 3 Yankee Conference (1952–1953, 1955)

Awards
- 2× Rhode Island Coach of the Year (1953, 1955); New England Coach of the Year (1955)

Harold W. Kopp (January 19, 1909 – May 10, 1998) was an American football coach. He served as the head football coach at the University of Rhode Island, Brigham Young University (BYU), and Bentley University, compiling a career college football record of 51–39–6.

At Rhode Island, Kopp led the Rams to three Yankee Conference titles in five seasons (two shared, one outright). When they won their first title in 1952, it was the first championship in the Rhode Island football program's history. In 1955, he led them to the program's first bowl game, the Refrigerator Bowl, where the Rams lost, 12–10, to Jacksonville State.

As the coach of the BYU Cougars football team, Kopp produced winning records in his last two seasons, but was dismissed from the university when rumors surfaced that he had committed a potential NCAA rules infraction. From 1964 to 1970 Kopp was head football coach at Waltham High School. The team went undefeated in 1965. Kopp was also the first-ever head coach for the Bentley Falcons football program when he took the reins in 1972. He coached there for four seasons.

Kopp was author of a book titled I've Seen It All. He died on May 10, 1998.

== Head coaching record ==
=== College ===
Year	Team	Overall	Conference	Standing	Bowl/playoffs
Rhode Island State Rams (Yankee Conference) (1950)
1950	Rhode Island State	3–5	2–3	3rd	
Rhode Island Rams (Yankee Conference) (1952–1955)
1952	Rhode Island	7–1	3–1	T–1st	
1953	Rhode Island	6–2	3–1	T–1st	
1954	Rhode Island	6–2	3–1	2nd	
1955	Rhode Island	6–1–2	4–0	1st	L Refrigerator
Rhode Island State / Rhode Island:		28–11–2	15–6		
BYU Cougars (Skyline Conference) (1956–1958)
1956	BYU	2–7–1	1–5–1	7th	
1957	BYU	5–3–2	5–1–1	2nd	
1958	BYU	6–4	5–2	3rd	
BYU:		13–14–3	11–8–2		
Bentley Falcons (Independent) (1972–1975)
1972	Bentley	4–2–1			
1973	Bentley	2–3			
1974	Bentley	3–3			
1975	Bentley	1–6			
Bentley:		10–14–1			
Total:		51–39–6			
National championship Conference title Conference division title or championship game berth
