= J. Edward Donnelly =

American football coach and administrator (1908–1999)

Biographical details
- Born: February 20, 1908; Norwich, Connecticut, U.S.
- Died: March 13, 1999 (aged 91); Burlington, Vermont, U.S.

Playing career

Football
- 1930: Chattanooga

Basketball
- 1930–1931: Chattanooga

Coaching career (HC unless noted)

Football
- 1945: Columbia (assistant backfield)
- 1947–1951: Boston University (assistant)
- 1952–1961: Vermont

Administrative career (AD unless noted)
- 1952–1973: Vermont

J. Edward Donnelly (February 20, 1908 – March 13, 1999) was an American college football coach and athletics administrator. He served as the head football coach at the University of Vermont from 1952 to 1961. He was also the athletic director as Vermont from 1952 to 1973. Donnelly played college football and college basketball at the University of Chattanooga—now known as the University of Tennessee at Chattanooga.

== Head coaching record ==
Year	Team	Overall	Conference	Standing	Bowl/playoffs
Vermont Catamounts (Yankee Conference) (1952–1961)
1952	Vermont	2–5	0–1	5th	
1953	Vermont	3–3–1	0–1	5th	
1954	Vermont	5–1–1	1–1	4th	
1954	Vermont	3–3–1	0–3	6th	
1956	Vermont	2–5	1–2	4th	
1957	Vermont	2–5	0–2	5th	
1958	Vermont	2–4–1	0–1	5th	
1959	Vermont	4–3	0–1	6th	
1960	Vermont	1–6	0–2	6th	
1961	Vermont	3–3–1	0–2	6th	
Vermont:		27–38–5	2–16		
Total:		27–38–5			
