= 1956 Vermont Catamounts football team =

American college football season

1956 Vermont Catamounts football
- Conference: Yankee Conference
- Record: 2–5 (1–2 Yankee)
- Head coach: J. Edward Donnelly (5th season)
- Home stadium: Centennial Field

1956 Yankee Conference football standings
	Conf.					Overall
Team	W		L		T	W		L		T
Connecticut $	3	–	0	–	1	6	–	2	–	1
Maine	3	–	1	–	0	5	–	2	–	0
New Hampshire	2	–	1	–	1	3	–	4	–	1
Vermont	1	–	2	–	0	2	–	5	–	0
UMass	1	–	3	–	0	2	–	5	–	1
Rhode Island	1	–	4	–	0	2	–	6	–	0
$ – Conference champion

The 1956 Vermont Catamounts football team was an American football team that represented the University of Vermont in the Yankee Conference during the 1956 college football season. In their fifth year under head coach J. Edward Donnelly, the team compiled a 2–5 record.

== Schedule ==
Date	Opponent	Site	Result	Attendance	Source
September 29	at Union (NY)*	Alexander Field; Schenectady, NY	L 6–13	3,500	
October 6	Maine^{†}	Centennial Field; Burlington, VT	L 0–14	6,500	
October 13	at Rhode Island	Meade Field; Kingston, RI	W 39–13		
October 20	at Rochester*	Fauver Stadium; Rochester, NY	W 6–0		
October 27	at Norwich*	Sabine Field; Northfield, VT	L 0–27		
November 3	UMass	Centennial Field; Burlington, VT	L 19–26		
November 10	Middlebury*	Centennial Field; Burlington, VT	L 6–7		
*Non-conference game; ^{†}Homecoming

== After the season ==
The following Catamount was selected in the 1957 NFL draft after the season.

Round	Pick	Player	Position	NFL club
19	218	Paul Harasimowicz	Tackle	Philadelphia Eagles
