= 1994 Maine Black Bears football team =

American college football season

1994 Maine Black Bears football
- Conference: Yankee Conference
- Record: 3–8 (2–6 Yankee)
- Head coach: Jack Cosgrove (2nd season)
- Co-offensive coordinators: Bob Wilder (1st season); Scott Walker (1st season)
- Defensive coordinator: Steve Spagnuolo (1st season)
- Captains: Steve Knight; Todd Park
- Home stadium: Alumni Field

1994 Yankee Conference football standings
	Conf.					Overall
Team	W		L		T	W		L		T
New England Division
No. 12 New Hampshire x$^	8	–	0	–	0	10	–	2	–	0
No. 9 Boston University ^	6	–	2	–	0	9	–	3	–	0
Connecticut	4	–	4	–	0	4	–	7	–	0
UMass	4	–	4	–	0	5	–	6	–	0
Rhode Island	2	–	6	–	0	2	–	9	–	0
Maine	2	–	6	–	0	3	–	8	–	0
Mid-Atlantic Division
No. 13 James Madison x^	6	–	2	–	0	10	–	3	–	0
No. 19 William & Mary x	6	–	2	–	0	8	–	3	–	0
Delaware	5	–	3	–	0	7	–	3	–	1
Villanova	2	–	6	–	0	5	–	6	–	0
Northeastern	2	–	6	–	0	2	–	9	–	0
Richmond	1	–	7	–	0	3	–	8	–	0
$ – Conference champion; x – Division champion/co-champions; ^ – NCAA Division I-AA playoff participant; Rankings from The Sports Network poll

The 1994 Maine Black Bears football team was an American football team that represented the University of Maine as a member of the Yankee Conference during the 1994 NCAA Division I-AA football season. In their second season under head coach Jack Cosgrove, the Black Bears compiled a 3–8 record (2–6 against conference opponents) and tied for last place in the New England Division of the Yankee Conference. Steve Knight and Todd Park were the team captains.

== Schedule ==
Date	Opponent	Site	Result	Attendance	Source
September 3	No. 7 UCF	Alumni Field; Orono, ME	L 6–28	6,296	
September 10	Rhode Island	Alumni Field; Orono, ME	L 21–28	4,013	
September 17	No. 7 Boston University	Alumni Field; Orono, ME	L 18–31		
September 24	at UMass	McGuirk Stadium; Hadley, MA	L 14–20	14,873	
October 1	No. 18 Delaware	Alumni Field; Orono, ME	W 19–13		
October 8	at Richmond	City Stadium; Richmond, VA	W 24–10	14,160	
October 15	at Connecticut	Memorial Stadium; Storrs, CT	W 35–31		
October 22	No. 25 New Hampshire	Alumni Field; Orono, ME (rivalry)	L 7–24	4,028	
October 29	vs. Buffalo	Fitzpatrick Stadium; Portland, ME	L 21–24	3,787	
November 5	at No. 20 William & Mary	Zable Stadium; Williamsburg, VA	L 0–17	14,687	
November 12	at Northeastern*	Parsons Field; Brookline, MA	L 16–23	3,100	
*Non-conference game; Rankings from The Sports Network Poll released prior to the game
