= 1950 Vermont Catamounts football team =

American college football season

1950 Vermont Catamounts football
- Conference: Yankee Conference
- Record: 2–5 (0–3 Yankee)
- Head coach: John C. Evans (8th season)
- Home stadium: Centennial Field

1950 Yankee Conference football standings
	Conf.					Overall
Team	W		L		T	W		L		T
New Hampshire $	4	–	0	–	0	8	–	0	–	0
Maine	3	–	1	–	0	5	–	1	–	1
Rhode Island State	2	–	2	–	0	3	–	5	–	0
UMass	1	–	1	–	0	3	–	5	–	0
Vermont	0	–	3	–	0	2	–	5	–	0
Connecticut	0	–	3	–	0	3	–	5	–	0
$ – Conference champion

The 1950 Vermont Catamounts football team was an American football team that represented the University of Vermont in the Yankee Conference during the 1950 college football season. In their eighth year under head coach John C. Evans, the team compiled a 2–5 record.

== Schedule ==
Date	Opponent	Site	Result	Attendance	Source
September 30	at Saint Michael's*	Athletic Field; Burlington, VT	L 6–27	6,000	
October 7	Maine	Centennial Field; Burlington, VT	L 7–15		
October 14	at Norwich*	Sabine Field; Northfield, VT	W 37–7	3,000	
October 21	at Rochester*	Fauver Stadium; Rochester, NY	L 12–25	6,500	
October 28	New Hampshire^{†}	Centennial Field; Burlington, VT	L 0–47	5,000	
November 4	at UMass	Alumni Field; Amherst, MA	L 13–27		
November 18	Middlebury*	Centennial Field; Burlington, VT	W 24–7		
*Non-conference game; ^{†}Homecoming
