= 1954 New Hampshire Wildcats football team =

American college football season

1954 New Hampshire Wildcats football

Yankee champion
- Conference: Yankee Conference
- Record: 7–1 (4–0 Yankee)
- Head coach: Chief Boston (6th season)
- Home stadium: Cowell Stadium

1954 Yankee Conference football standings
	Conf.					Overall
Team	W		L		T	W		L		T
New Hampshire $	4	–	0	–	0	7	–	1	–	0
Rhode Island	3	–	1	–	0	6	–	2	–	0
Maine	2	–	2	–	0	5	–	2	–	0
Vermont	1	–	1	–	0	5	–	1	–	1
UMass	1	–	3	–	0	4	–	4	–	0
Connecticut	0	–	4	–	0	1	–	8	–	0
$ – Conference champion

The 1954 New Hampshire Wildcats football team was an American football team that represented the University of New Hampshire as a member of the Yankee Conference during the 1954 college football season. In its sixth year under head coach Chief Boston, the team compiled a 7–1 record (4–0 against conference opponents) and won the Yankee Conference championship.

== Schedule ==
Date	Opponent	Site	Result	Attendance	Source
September 25	at Bridgeport*	Bridgeport, CT	W 37–6		
October 2	Rhode Island	Cowell Stadium; Durham, NH	W 33–6		
October 9	at Maine	Orono, ME (Battle for the Brice–Cowell Musket)	W 21–10		
October 16	Delaware*	Cowell Stadium; Durham, NH	L 13–19	9,000	
October 23	at Brandeis*	Waltham, MA	W 20–7		
October 30	Connecticut	Cowell Stadium; Durham, NH	W 34–0		
November 6	at UMass	Alumni Field; Amherst, MA (rivalry)	W 32–12		
November 13	Springfield*	Cowell Stadium; Durham, NH	W 48–0		
*Non-conference game
