= 1954 Maine Black Bears football team =

American college football season

1954 Maine Black Bears football

MIAA champion
- Conference: Yankee Conference, Maine Intercollegiate Athletic Association
- Record: 5–2 (2–2 Yankee, 3–0 MIAA)
- Head coach: Harold Westerman (4th season)
- Captains: Thomas Golden; Ernest Short
- Home stadium: Alumni Field

1954 Yankee Conference football standings
	Conf.					Overall
Team	W		L		T	W		L		T
New Hampshire $	4	–	0	–	0	7	–	1	–	0
Rhode Island	3	–	1	–	0	6	–	2	–	0
Maine	2	–	2	–	0	5	–	2	–	0
Vermont	1	–	1	–	0	5	–	1	–	1
UMass	1	–	3	–	0	4	–	4	–	0
Connecticut	0	–	4	–	0	1	–	8	–	0
$ – Conference champion

The 1954 Maine Black Bears football team was an American football team that represented the University of Maine as a member of the Yankee Conference and Maine Intercollegiate Athletic Association during the 1954 college football season. In its fourth season under head coach Harold Westerman, the team compiled a 5–2 record (2–2 against Yankee Conference and 3–0 against MIAA opponents), finished third out of the six teams in the Yankee Conference, and won the Maine "State Series" championship. The team played its home games at Alumni Field in Orono, Maine. Thomas Golden and Ernest Short were the team captains.

The team was led on offense by triple-threat quarterback Billy Pappas.

== Schedule ==
Date	Opponent	Site	Result	Attendance	Source
September 25	Rhode Island	Alumni Field; Orono, ME	L 7–14		
October 2	at Vermont	Centennial Field; Burlington, VT	W 23–20	6,500	
October 9	New Hampshire	Alumni Field; Orono, ME (rivalry)	L 10–21		
October 16	at Connecticut	Memorial Stadium; Storrs, CT	W 41–13	11,000	
October 23	Bates	Alumni Field; Orono, ME	W 35–0		
October 30	Colby	Alumni Field; Orono, ME	W 33–6	6,500	
November 6	at Bowdoin	Whittier Field; Brunswick, ME	W 27–13		
