= 1948 Connecticut Huskies football team =

American college football season

1948 Connecticut Huskies football
- Conference: Yankee Conference
- Record: 3–5 (2–1 Yankee)
- Head coach: J. Orlean Christian (14th season)
- Home stadium: Gardner Dow Athletic Fields

1948 Yankee Conference football standings
	Conf.					Overall
Team	W		L		T	W		L		T
New Hampshire $	3	–	1	–	0	5	–	3	–	0
Connecticut	2	–	1	–	0	3	–	5	–	0
Vermont	1	–	1	–	0	4	–	3	–	1
UMass	1	–	1	–	1	3	–	4	–	1
Maine	1	–	2	–	0	4	–	3	–	0
Rhode Island State	1	–	3	–	0	2	–	4	–	1
$ – Conference champion

The 1948 Connecticut Huskies football team represented the University of Connecticut in the 1948 college football season. The Huskies were led by 14th-year head coach J. Orlean Christian and completed the season with a record of 3–5.

Connecticut was ranked at No. 190 in the final Litkenhous Difference by Score System ratings for 1948.

== Schedule ==
Date	Opponent	Site	Result	Attendance	Source
October 2	at Yale*	Yale Bowl; New Haven, CT	L 0–7	25,000	
October 9	Springfield*	Gardner Dow Athletic Fields; Storrs, CT	L 7–10		
October 16	Maine^{†}	Gardner Dow Athletic Fields; Storrs, CT	W 34–6	6,200	
October 23	at Brown*	Brown Stadium; Providence, RI	L 6–49	10,000	
October 30	Champlain*	Gardner Dow Athletic Fields; Storrs, CT	W 64–7		
November 6	at Rhode Island State	Meade Stadium; Kingston, RI (rivalry)	W 28–6		
November 13	at New Hampshire	Lewis Field; Durham, NH	L 7–20		
November 20	Kent State*	Gardner Dow Athletic Fields; Storrs, CT	L 26–42		
*Non-conference game; ^{†}Homecoming
