= 1956 UMass Redmen football team =

American college football season

1956 UMass Redmen football
- Conference: Yankee Conference
- Record: 2–5–1 (1–4 Yankee)
- Head coach: Charlie O'Rourke (5th season)
- Home stadium: Alumni Field

1956 Yankee Conference football standings
	Conf.					Overall
Team	W		L		T	W		L		T
Connecticut $	3	–	0	–	1	6	–	2	–	1
Maine	3	–	1	–	0	5	–	2	–	0
New Hampshire	2	–	1	–	1	3	–	4	–	1
Vermont	1	–	2	–	0	2	–	5	–	0
UMass	1	–	3	–	0	2	–	5	–	1
Rhode Island	1	–	4	–	0	2	–	6	–	0
$ – Conference champion

The 1956 UMass Redmen football team represented the University of Massachusetts Amherst in the 1956 college football season as a member of the Yankee Conference in the NCAA's newly created College Division. The team was coached by Charlie O'Rourke and played its home games at Alumni Field in Amherst, Massachusetts. UMass finished the season with a record of 2–5–1 overall and 1–4 in conference play.

== Schedule ==
Date	Opponent	Site	Result	Attendance	Source
September 22	at American International*	Springfield, MA	T 6–6		
September 29	at Boston University*	Nickerson Field; Boston, MA	L 6–19		
October 13	at Connecticut	Alumni Field; Amherst, MA (rivalry)	L 6–71		
October 20	at Rhode Island	Meade Stadium; Kingston, RI	L 13–34		
October 27	Northeastern*	Alumni Field; Amherst, MA	W 12–6		
November 3	at Vermont	Centennial Field; Burlington, VT	W 26–19		
November 10	Brandeis*	Alumni Field; Amherst, MA	L 7–47		
November 17	New Hampshire	Alumni Field; Amherst, MA (rivalry)	L 7–28	4,500	
*Non-conference game
