= 1994 Richmond Spiders football team =

American college football season

1994 Richmond Spiders football
- Conference: Yankee Conference
- Record: 3–8 (1–7 Yankee)
- Head coach: Jim Marshall (6th season)
- Home stadium: UR Stadium

1994 Yankee Conference football standings
	Conf.					Overall
Team	W		L		T	W		L		T
New England Division
No. 12 New Hampshire x$^	8	–	0	–	0	10	–	2	–	0
No. 9 Boston University ^	6	–	2	–	0	9	–	3	–	0
Connecticut	4	–	4	–	0	4	–	7	–	0
UMass	4	–	4	–	0	5	–	6	–	0
Rhode Island	2	–	6	–	0	2	–	9	–	0
Maine	2	–	6	–	0	3	–	8	–	0
Mid-Atlantic Division
No. 13 James Madison x^	6	–	2	–	0	10	–	3	–	0
No. 19 William & Mary x	6	–	2	–	0	8	–	3	–	0
Delaware	5	–	3	–	0	7	–	3	–	1
Villanova	2	–	6	–	0	5	–	6	–	0
Northeastern	2	–	6	–	0	2	–	9	–	0
Richmond	1	–	7	–	0	3	–	8	–	0
$ – Conference champion; x – Division champion/co-champions; ^ – NCAA Division I-AA playoff participant; Rankings from The Sports Network poll

The 1994 Richmond Spiders football team was an American football team that represented the University of Richmond as a member of the Yankee Conference during the 1994 NCAA Division I-AA football season. In their sixth season under head coach Jim Marshall, Richmond compiled a 3–8 record, with a mark of 1–7 in conference play, finishing in sixth place in the Mid-Atlantic division of the Yankee conference.

== Schedule ==
Date	Opponent	Site	Result	Attendance	Source
September 3	at VMI*	Alumni Memorial Field; Lexington, VA (rivalry)	W 34–31	7,866	
September 10	No. 25 UMass	UR Stadium; Richmond, VA	W 14–13	9,822	
September 17	at Connecticut	Memorial Stadium; Storrs, CT	L 21–36	8,292	
September 24	at Northeastern	Parsons Field; Brookline, MA	W 23–11	3,800	
October 1	at Villanova	Villanova Stadium; Villanova, PA	L 6–38	9,343	
October 8	Maine	UR Stadium; Richmond, VA	L 10–24	14,160	
October 15	Delaware	UR Stadium; Richmond, VA	L 3–28	6,215	
October 22	at No. 7 Boston University	Nickerson Field; Boston, MA	L 24–40	10,533	
October 29	No. 10 James Madison	UR Stadium; Richmond, VA (rivalry)	L 16–29	17,210	
November 5	No. 19 New Hampshire	UR Stadium; Richmond, VA	L 14–42	3,069	
November 19	No. 20 William & Mary	UR Stadium; Richmond, VA (rivalry)	L 20–21	10,683	
*Non-conference game; Rankings from NCAA Division I-AA Football Committee Poll released prior to the game
