= 1957 Connecticut Huskies football team =

American college football season

1957 Connecticut Huskies football

Yankee Conference co-champion
- Conference: Yankee Conference
- Record: 5–4–1 (3–0–1 Yankee)
- Head coach: Bob Ingalls (6th season)
- Home stadium: Memorial Stadium

1957 Yankee Conference football standings
	Conf.					Overall
Team	W		L		T	W		L		T
Rhode Island +	3	–	0	–	1	5	–	2	–	1
Connecticut +	3	–	0	–	1	5	–	4	–	1
Maine	2	–	2	–	0	4	–	4	–	0
UMass	1	–	2	–	1	1	–	5	–	1
Vermont	0	–	2	–	0	2	–	5	–	0
New Hampshire	0	–	3	–	1	0	–	7	–	1
+ – Conference co-champions

The 1957 Connecticut Huskies football team represented the University of Connecticut in the 1957 college football season. The Huskies were led by sixth-year head coach Bob Ingalls, and completed the season with a record of 5–4–1.

== Schedule ==
Date	Time	Opponent	Site	Result	Attendance	Source
September 21	1:30 p.m.	at Springfield*	Pratt Field; Springfield, MA	L 14–19	5,100	
September 28		at Yale*	Yale Bowl; New Haven, CT	L 0–27	24,196	
October 5		at Rutgers*	Rutgers Stadium; Piscataway, NJ	L 7–14	5,500	
October 12		UMass	Memorial Stadium; Storrs, CT (rivalry)	W 19–6		
October 19		at Maine	Alumni Field; Orono, ME	W 19–0		
October 26		Delaware*	Memorial Stadium; Storrs, CT	W 13–9	7,643	
November 2		New Hampshire	Memorial Stadium; Storrs, CT	W 18–0		
November 9		at Northeastern*	Parsons Field; Brookline, MA	W 46–14		
November 16		Rhode Island	Memorial Stadium; Storrs, CT (rivalry)	T 0–0		
November 23		at Boston University*	Boston University Field; Boston, MA	L 7–32		
*Non-conference game; All times are in Eastern time

== After the season ==
=== NFL draft ===
The following Husky was drafted into the National Football League following the season.

Round	Pick	Player	Position	NFL club
18	210	Lenny King	Back	Washington Redskins
