= 1956 Connecticut Huskies football team =

American college football season

1956 Connecticut Huskies football

Yankee Conference champion
- Conference: Yankee Conference
- Record: 6–2–1 (3–0–1 Yankee)
- Head coach: Bob Ingalls (5th season)
- Home stadium: Memorial Stadium

1956 Yankee Conference football standings
	Conf.					Overall
Team	W		L		T	W		L		T
Connecticut $	3	–	0	–	1	6	–	2	–	1
Maine	3	–	1	–	0	5	–	2	–	0
New Hampshire	2	–	1	–	1	3	–	4	–	1
Vermont	1	–	2	–	0	2	–	5	–	0
UMass	1	–	3	–	0	2	–	5	–	1
Rhode Island	1	–	4	–	0	2	–	6	–	0
$ – Conference champion

The 1956 Connecticut Huskies football team represented the University of Connecticut in the 1956 college football season. The Huskies were led by fifth-year head coach Bob Ingalls, and completed the season with a record of 6–2–1.

== Schedule ==
Date	Time	Opponent	Site	Result	Attendance	Source
September 22	2:00 p.m.	Springfield*	Memorial Stadium; Storrs, CT	L 12–41	6,000	
September 29		at Yale*	Yale Bowl; New Haven, CT	L 14–19	17,828	
October 6		Rutgers*	Memorial Stadium; Storrs, CT	W 27–7	7,429	
October 13		UMass	Memorial Stadium; Storrs, CT (rivalry)	W 71–6		
October 20		Maine	Memorial Stadium; Storrs, CT	W 13–7		
October 26		Delaware*	Memorial Stadium; Storrs, CT	W 26–14	5,656	
November 3		at New Hampshire	Cowell Stadium; Durham, NH	T 0–0	8,000	
November 10		Northeastern*	Memorial Stadium; Storrs, CT	W 26–0		
November 17		at Rhode Island	Meade Stadium; Kingston, RI (rivalry)	W 51–6		
*Non-conference game; All times are in Eastern time
