= 1950 UMass Redmen football team =

American college football season

1950 UMass Redmen football
- Conference: Yankee Conference
- Record: 3–5 (1–1 Yankee)
- Head coach: Thomas Eck (5th season)
- Home stadium: Alumni Field

1950 Yankee Conference football standings
	Conf.					Overall
Team	W		L		T	W		L		T
New Hampshire $	4	–	0	–	0	8	–	0	–	0
Maine	3	–	1	–	0	5	–	1	–	1
Rhode Island State	2	–	2	–	0	3	–	5	–	0
UMass	1	–	1	–	0	3	–	5	–	0
Vermont	0	–	3	–	0	2	–	5	–	0
Connecticut	0	–	3	–	0	3	–	5	–	0
$ – Conference champion

The 1950 UMass Redmen football team represented the University of Massachusetts Amherst in the 1950 college football season as a member of the Yankee Conference. The team was coached by Thomas Eck and played its home games at Alumni Field in Amherst, Massachusetts. UMass finished the season with a record of 3–5 overall and 1–1 in conference play.

== Schedule ==
Date	Opponent	Site	Result	Source
September 30	Bates*	Alumni Field; Amherst, MA	W 26–0	
October 7	at Worcester Tech*	Alumni Field; Worcester, MA	L 20–21	
October 14	at Williams*	Weston Field; Williamstown, MA	L 34–42	
October 21	at Rhode Island State	Meade Stadium; Kingston, RI	L 27–38	
October 28	Northeastern*	Alumni Field; Amherst, MA	W 27–6	
November 4	Vermont	Alumni Field; Amherst, MA	W 27–13	
November 11	Springfield*	Alumni Field; Amherst, MA	L 0–26	
November 18	at Tufts*	Tufts Oval; Somerville, MA	L 6–7	
*Non-conference game
