= 1953 Maine Black Bears football team =

American college football season

1953 Maine Black Bears football

MIAA champion
- Conference: Yankee Conference, Maine Intercollegiate Athletic Association
- Record: 4–2–1 (1–2–1 Yankee, 3–0 MIAA)
- Head coach: Harold Westerman (3rd season)
- Captains: Ed Bogdanovich; Ed Cianchette
- Home stadium: Alumni Field

1953 Yankee Conference football standings
	Conf.					Overall
Team	W		L		T	W		L		T
New Hampshire +	3	–	1	–	0	6	–	2	–	0
Rhode Island +	3	–	1	–	0	6	–	2	–	0
Connecticut	2	–	1	–	1	3	–	4	–	1
Maine	1	–	2	–	1	4	–	2	–	1
Vermont	0	–	1	–	0	3	–	3	–	1
UMass	0	–	3	–	0	1	–	7	–	0
+ – Conference co-champions

The 1953 Maine Black Bears football team was an American football team that represented the University of Maine as a member of the Yankee Conference and Maine Intercollegiate Athletic Association during the 1953 college football season. In its third season under head coach Harold Westerman, the team compiled a 4–2–1 record (1–2–1 against Yankee Conference and 3–0 against MIAA opponents) and finished fourth out of the six teams in the Yankee Conference. The team played its home games at Alumni Field in Orono, Maine. Ed Bogdanovich and Ed Cianchette were the team captains.

== Schedule ==
Date	Opponent	Site	Result	Attendance	Source
September 26	at Rhode Island	Meade Stadium; Kingston, RI	L 6–13		
October 3	Vermont	Alumni Field; Orono, ME	W 13–0		
October 10	at New Hampshire	Cowell Stadium; Durham, NH (rivalry)	L 6–21		
October 17	Connecticut	Alumni Field; Orono, ME	T 18–18		
October 24	at Bates	Garcelon Field; Lewiston, ME	W 37–7		
October 31	at Colby	Seaverns Field; Waterville, ME	W 45–13		
November 7	Bowdoin	Alumni Field; Orono, ME	W 35–7		
