= 1994 Delaware Fightin' Blue Hens football team =

American college football season

1994 Delaware Fightin' Blue Hens football
- Conference: Yankee Conference
- Mid-Atlantic Division
- Record: 7–3–1 (5–3 Yankee)
- Head coach: Tubby Raymond (29th season)
- Offensive coordinator: Ted Kempski (27th season)
- Offensive scheme: Delaware Wing-T
- Defensive coordinator: Bob Sabol (4th season)
- Base defense: 4–3
- Home stadium: Delaware Stadium

1994 Yankee Conference football standings
	Conf.					Overall
Team	W		L		T	W		L		T
New England Division
No. 12 New Hampshire x$^	8	–	0	–	0	10	–	2	–	0
No. 9 Boston University ^	6	–	2	–	0	9	–	3	–	0
Connecticut	4	–	4	–	0	4	–	7	–	0
UMass	4	–	4	–	0	5	–	6	–	0
Rhode Island	2	–	6	–	0	2	–	9	–	0
Maine	2	–	6	–	0	3	–	8	–	0
Mid-Atlantic Division
No. 13 James Madison x^	6	–	2	–	0	10	–	3	–	0
No. 19 William & Mary x	6	–	2	–	0	8	–	3	–	0
Delaware	5	–	3	–	0	7	–	3	–	1
Villanova	2	–	6	–	0	5	–	6	–	0
Northeastern	2	–	6	–	0	2	–	9	–	0
Richmond	1	–	7	–	0	3	–	8	–	0
$ – Conference champion; x – Division champion/co-champions; ^ – NCAA Division I-AA playoff participant; Rankings from The Sports Network poll

The 1994 Delaware Fightin' Blue Hens football team represented the University of Delaware as a member of the Mid-Atlantic Division of the Yankee Conference during the 1994 NCAA Division I-AA football season. Led by 29th-year head coach Tubby Raymond, the Fightin' Blue Hens compiled an overall record of 7–3–1 with a mark of 5–3 in conference play, placing third in the Yankee Conference's Mid-Atlantic Division. The team played home games at Delaware Stadium in Newark, Delaware.

== Schedule ==
Date	Opponent	Rank	Site	Result	Attendance	Source
September 10	at No. 18 William & Mary	No. 12	Zable Stadium; Williamsburg, VA (rivalry)	L 10–31	12,136	
September 17	at Villanova	No. 24	Villanova Stadium; Villanova, PA (Battle of the Blue)	W 38–31 ^{OT}	9,175	
September 24	West Chester*	No. 20	Delaware Stadium; Newark, DE (rivalry)	W 58–55		
October 1	at Maine	No. 18	Alumni Field; Orono, ME	L 13–19		
October 8	No. 19 James Madison		Delaware Stadium; Newark, DE (rivalry)	L 10–30		
October 15	at Richmond		University of Richmond Stadium; Richmond, VA	W 28–3	6,215	
October 22	UMass^{†}		Delaware Stadium; Newark, DE	W 52–14	18,978	
October 29	Northeastern		Delaware Stadium; Newark, DE	W 42–20	20,047	
November 5	at Lehigh*		Goodman Stadium; Bethlehem, PA (rivalry)	W 45–29	10,480	
November 12	No. 23 Hofstra*		Delaware Stadium; Newark, DE	T 41–41		
November 19	Rhode Island		Delaware Stadium; Newark, DE	W 26–7	11,646	
*Non-conference game; ^{†}Homecoming; Rankings from The Sports Network Poll released prior to the game

== Roster ==
1994 Delaware Fightin' Blue Hens football team roster
Players
Coaches
Offense

Pos.	#	Name	Class
QB	19	Matt Alexander	So
WR	24	Mike Sye	Sr

Defense

Pos.	#	Name	Class
DB	4	Paul Williams	Jr

Special teams

Pos.	#	Name	Class

Head coach

- Tubby Raymond

Coordinators/assistant coaches

Legend

- (C) Team captain
- (S) Suspended
- (I) Ineligible
- Injured
- Redshirt

Roster
