= 1994 William & Mary Tribe football team =

American college football season

1994 William & Mary Tribe football

Yankee Mid-Atlantic division co-champion
- Conference: Yankee Conference
- Mid-Atlantic Division

Ranking
- Sports Network: No. 19
- Record: 8–3 (6–2 Yankee)
- Head coach: Jimmye Laycock (15th season)
- Offensive coordinator: Zbig Kepa (2nd season)
- Defensive coordinator: Joe Bottiglieri (4th season)
- Captains: Greg Applewhite; Mike Tomlin
- Home stadium: Zable Stadium

1994 Yankee Conference football standings
	Conf.					Overall
Team	W		L		T	W		L		T
New England Division
No. 12 New Hampshire x$^	8	–	0	–	0	10	–	2	–	0
No. 9 Boston University ^	6	–	2	–	0	9	–	3	–	0
Connecticut	4	–	4	–	0	4	–	7	–	0
UMass	4	–	4	–	0	5	–	6	–	0
Rhode Island	2	–	6	–	0	2	–	9	–	0
Maine	2	–	6	–	0	3	–	8	–	0
Mid-Atlantic Division
No. 13 James Madison x^	6	–	2	–	0	10	–	3	–	0
No. 19 William & Mary x	6	–	2	–	0	8	–	3	–	0
Delaware	5	–	3	–	0	7	–	3	–	1
Villanova	2	–	6	–	0	5	–	6	–	0
Northeastern	2	–	6	–	0	2	–	9	–	0
Richmond	1	–	7	–	0	3	–	8	–	0
$ – Conference champion; x – Division champion/co-champions; ^ – NCAA Division I-AA playoff participant; Rankings from The Sports Network poll

The 1994 William & Mary Tribe football team represented the College of William & Mary as member of the Mid-Atlantic Division of the Yankee Conference during the 1994 NCAA Division I-AA football season. Led by Jimmye Laycock in his 15th year as head coach, William & Mary finished the season with an overall record of 8–3 and a mark of 6–2 in Yankee Conference play, sharing the Mid-Atlantic Division title with James Madison. They were ranked No. 19 in the final Sports Network poll, but did not receive a bid to the NCAA Division I-AA playoffs.

== Schedule ==
Date	Opponent	Rank	Site	Result	Attendance	Source
September 3	at Rhode Island	No. 21	Meade Stadium; Kingston, RI	W 38–17	3,383	
September 10	No. 12 Delaware	No. 18	Zable Stadium; Williamsburg, VA (rivalry)	W 31–7	12,136	
September 17	at Furman*	No. 8	Paladin Stadium; Greenville, SC	W 28–26	11,244	
September 24	VMI*	No. 8	Zable Stadium; Williamsburg, VA (rivalry)	W 45–7	14,014	
October 1	at Virginia*	No. 8	Scott Stadium; Charlottesville, VA	L 3–37	38,300	
October 8	Northeastern	No. 8	Zable Stadium; Williamsburg, VA	W 17–12	7,894	
October 15	UMass	No. 7	Zable Stadium; Williamsburg, VA	L 14–23	9,042	
October 22	at No. 12 James Madison	No. 14	Bridgeforth Stadium; Harrisonburg, VA (rivalry)	L 7–33	12,500	
October 29	at Villanova	No. 23	Villanova Stadium; Villanova, PA	W 53–28	6,735	
November 5	Maine	No. 20	Zable Stadium; Williamsburg, VA	W 17–0	14,687	
November 19	at Richmond	No. 20	University of Richmond Stadium; Richmond, VA (I-64 Bowl)	W 21–20	10,683	
*Non-conference game; Rankings from The Sports Network Poll released prior to the game

== Roster ==
1994 William & Mary Tribe football team roster
Players
Coaches
Offense

Pos.	#	Name	Class
WR		Mike Tomlin	Sr

Defense

Pos.	#	Name	Class
S		Sean McDermott	Fr
DB	12	Darren Sharper	So

Special teams

Pos.	#	Name	Class

Head coach

- Jimmye Laycock

Coordinators/assistant coaches

Legend

- (C) Team captain
- (S) Suspended
- (I) Ineligible
- Injured
- Redshirt
