= 1994 Northeastern Huskies football team =

American college football season

1994 Northeastern Huskies football
- Conference: Yankee Conference
- Mid-Atlantic Division
- Record: 2–9 (2–6 Yankee)
- Head coach: Barry Gallup (4th season)
- Home stadium: Parsons Field

1994 Yankee Conference football standings
| | Conf. | | | | | Overall |
| Team | W | | L | | T | W | | L | | T |
|---|---|---|---|---|---|---|---|---|---|---|
New England Division
| No. 12 New Hampshire x$^ | 8 | – | 0 | – | 0 | 10 | – | 2 | – | 0 |
| No. 9 Boston University ^ | 6 | – | 2 | – | 0 | 9 | – | 3 | – | 0 |
| Connecticut | 4 | – | 4 | – | 0 | 4 | – | 7 | – | 0 |
| UMass | 4 | – | 4 | – | 0 | 5 | – | 6 | – | 0 |
| Rhode Island | 2 | – | 6 | – | 0 | 2 | – | 9 | – | 0 |
| Maine | 2 | – | 6 | – | 0 | 3 | – | 8 | – | 0 |
Mid-Atlantic Division
| No. 13 James Madison x^ | 6 | – | 2 | – | 0 | 10 | – | 3 | – | 0 |
| No. 19 William & Mary x | 6 | – | 2 | – | 0 | 8 | – | 3 | – | 0 |
| Delaware | 5 | – | 3 | – | 0 | 7 | – | 3 | – | 1 |
| Villanova | 2 | – | 6 | – | 0 | 5 | – | 6 | – | 0 |
| Northeastern | 2 | – | 6 | – | 0 | 2 | – | 9 | – | 0 |
| Richmond | 1 | – | 7 | – | 0 | 3 | – | 8 | – | 0 |
$ – Conference champion; x – Division champion/co-champions; ^ – NCAA Division I-AA playoff participant; Rankings from The Sports Network poll

The 1994 Northeastern Huskies football team was an American football team that represented Northeastern University as a member of the Mid-Atlantic Division of the Yankee Conference during the 1994 NCAA Division I-AA football season. Led by fourth-year head coach Barry Gallup, the team compiled an overall record of 2–9 with a mark of 2–6 in conference play, tying for fourth place in the Mid-Atlantic Division.

== Schedule ==
| Date | Opponent | Site | Result | Attendance | Source |
|---|---|---|---|---|---|
| September 3 | at Boise State* | Bronco Stadium; Boise, ID | L 26–36 | 19,509 | |
| September 10 | New Hampshire | Parsons Field; Brookline, MA | L 7–28 | | |
| September 17 | Rhode Island | Parsons Field; Brookline, MA | L 20–27 | 4,050 | |
| September 24 | Richmond | Parsons Field; Brookline, MA | L 11–23 | 3,800 | |
| October 8 | at No. 8 William & Mary | Zable Stadium; Williamsburg, VA | L 12–17 | 7,894 | |
| October 15 | at No. 10 Boston University | Nickerson Field; Boston, MA | L 14–35 | | |
| October 22 | Villanova | Parsons Field; Brookline, MA | L 9–13 | 6,250 | |
| October 29 | at Delaware | Delaware Stadium; Newark, DE | L 20–42 | 20,047 | |
| November 5 | at UMass | McGuirk Stadium; Hadley, MA | L 24–27 | 6,511 | |
| November 12 | Maine | Parsons Field; Brookline, MA | W 23–16 | 3,100 | |
| November 19 | at No. 5 James Madison | Bridgeforth Stadium; Harrisonburg, VA | W 9–6 ^{OT} | 10,000 | |
*Non-conference game; Rankings from The Sports Network Poll released prior to the game
