= 1994 James Madison Dukes football team =

American college football season

1994 James Madison Dukes football

Lambert Cup winner

NCAA Division I-AA Quarterfinal, L 21–28 at Marshall
- Conference: Yankee Conference
- Mid-Atlantic Division

Ranking
- Sports Network: No. 13
- Record: 10–3 (6–2 Yankee)
- Head coach: Rip Scherer (4th season)
- Home stadium: Bridgeforth Stadium

1994 Yankee Conference football standings
	Conf.					Overall
Team	W		L		T	W		L		T
New England Division
No. 12 New Hampshire x$^	8	–	0	–	0	10	–	2	–	0
No. 9 Boston University ^	6	–	2	–	0	9	–	3	–	0
Connecticut	4	–	4	–	0	4	–	7	–	0
UMass	4	–	4	–	0	5	–	6	–	0
Rhode Island	2	–	6	–	0	2	–	9	–	0
Maine	2	–	6	–	0	3	–	8	–	0
Mid-Atlantic Division
No. 13 James Madison x^	6	–	2	–	0	10	–	3	–	0
No. 19 William & Mary x	6	–	2	–	0	8	–	3	–	0
Delaware	5	–	3	–	0	7	–	3	–	1
Villanova	2	–	6	–	0	5	–	6	–	0
Northeastern	2	–	6	–	0	2	–	9	–	0
Richmond	1	–	7	–	0	3	–	8	–	0
$ – Conference champion; x – Division champion/co-champions; ^ – NCAA Division I-AA playoff participant; Rankings from The Sports Network poll

The 1994 James Madison Dukes football team was an American football team that represented James Madison University during the 1994 NCAA Division I-AA football season as a member of the Yankee Conference. In their fourth year under head coach Rip Scherer, the team compiled a 10–3 record.

== Schedule ==
Date	Opponent	Rank	Site	Result	Attendance	Source
September 3	Buffalo*		Bridgeforth Stadium; Harrisonburg, VA	W 35–0		
September 10	No. 13 Middle Tennessee*		Bridgeforth Stadium; Harrisonburg, VA	W 24–22	10,500	
September 17	at New Hampshire	No. 19	Cowell Stadium; Durham, NH	L 24–27	6,173	
October 1	at No. 7 Boston University		Nickerson Field; Boston, MA	W 24–21	7,809	
October 8	at Delaware	No. 19	Delaware Stadium; Newark, DE (rivalry)	W 30–10		
October 15	Villanova	No. 17	Bridgeforth Stadium; Harrisonburg, VA	W 31–23	15,000	
October 22	No. 14 William & Mary	No. 12	Bridgeforth Stadium; Harrisonburg, VA (rivalry)	W 33–7	12,500	
October 29	at Richmond	No. 10	City Stadium; Richmond, VA (rivalry)	W 29–16	17,210	
November 5	at VMI*	No. 10	Alumni Memorial Field; Lexington, VA	W 38–15		
November 12	Connecticut	No. 9	Bridgeforth Stadium; Harrisonburg, VA	W 48–20	11,000	
November 19	Northeastern	No. 5	Bridgeforth Stadium; Harrisonburg, VA	L 6–9 ^{OT}	10,000	
November 26	No. 10 Troy State*	No. 13	Bridgeforth Stadium; Harrisonburg, VA (NCAA Division I-AA First Round)	W 45–26	5,200	
December 3	at No. 2 Marshall*	No. 13	Marshall University Stadium; Huntington, WV (NCAA Division I-AA Quarterfinal)	L 21–28 ^{OT}	16,494	
*Non-conference game; Rankings from The Sports Network Poll released prior to the game
