= 1953 New Hampshire Wildcats football team =

American college football season

1953 New Hampshire Wildcats football

Yankee co-champion
- Conference: Yankee Conference
- Record: 6–2 (3–1 Yankee)
- Head coach: Chief Boston (5th season)
- Home stadium: Cowell Stadium

1953 Yankee Conference football standings
| | Conf. | | | | | Overall |
| Team | W | | L | | T | W | | L | | T |
|---|---|---|---|---|---|---|---|---|---|---|
| New Hampshire + | 3 | – | 1 | – | 0 | 6 | – | 2 | – | 0 |
| Rhode Island + | 3 | – | 1 | – | 0 | 6 | – | 2 | – | 0 |
| Connecticut | 2 | – | 1 | – | 1 | 3 | – | 4 | – | 1 |
| Maine | 1 | – | 2 | – | 1 | 4 | – | 2 | – | 1 |
| Vermont | 0 | – | 1 | – | 0 | 3 | – | 3 | – | 1 |
| UMass | 0 | – | 3 | – | 0 | 1 | – | 7 | – | 0 |
+ – Conference co-champions

The 1953 New Hampshire Wildcats football team was an American football team that represented the University of New Hampshire, as a member of the Yankee Conference during the 1953 college football season. In its fifth year under head coach Chief Boston, the team compiled a 6–2 record (3–1 against conference opponents) and tied for the Yankee Conference championship.

== Schedule ==
| Date | Opponent | Site | Result | Attendance | Source |
|---|---|---|---|---|---|
| September 26 | Upsala* | Cowell Stadium; Durham, NH | W 27–13 | | |
| October 3 | at Rhode Island | Meade Stadium; Kingston, RI | W 14–13 | | |
| October 10 | Maine | Cowell Stadium; Durham, NH (Battle for the Brice–Cowell Musket) | W 21–6 | | |
| October 17 | at Delaware | Delaware Stadium; Newark, DE | L 0–48 | 3,842 | |
| October 24 | St. Lawrence | Cowell Stadium; Durham, NH | W 34–0 | | |
| October 31 | at Connecticut | Memorial Stadium; Storrs, CT | L 0–6 | | |
| November 14 | at Springfield | Springfield, MA | W 7–6 | | |
| November 21 | UMass | Cowell Stadium; Durham, NH (rivalry) | W 32–12 | | |
*Non-conference game
