= 1948 New Hampshire Wildcats football team =

American college football season

1948 New Hampshire Wildcats football
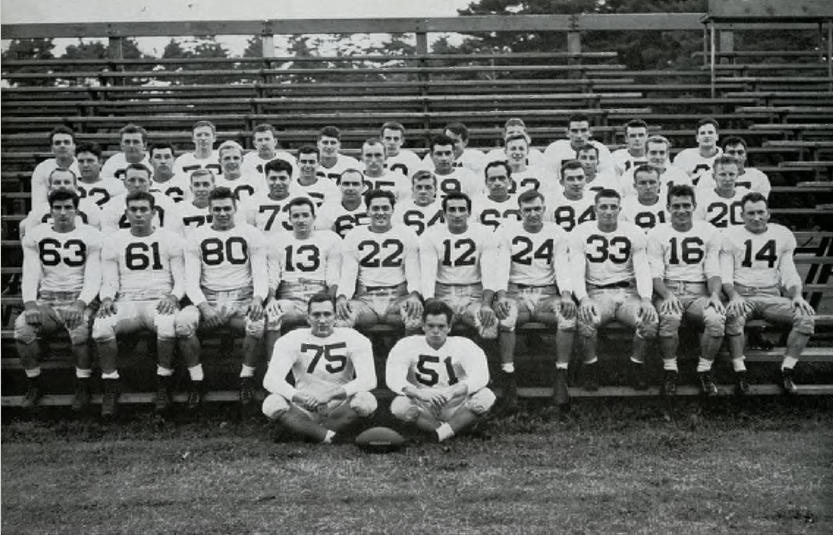

Yankee Conference champion
- Conference: Yankee Conference
- Record: 5–3 (3–1 Yankee)
- Head coach: Bill Glassford (3rd season)
- Offensive scheme: T formation
- Captain: Moe Ross & Ted Pieciorak
- Home stadium: Lewis Field

1948 Yankee Conference football standings
	Conf.					Overall
Team	W		L		T	W		L		T
New Hampshire $	3	–	1	–	0	5	–	3	–	0
Connecticut	2	–	1	–	0	3	–	5	–	0
Vermont	1	–	1	–	0	4	–	3	–	1
UMass	1	–	1	–	1	3	–	4	–	1
Maine	1	–	2	–	0	4	–	3	–	0
Rhode Island State	1	–	3	–	0	2	–	4	–	1
$ – Conference champion

The 1948 New Hampshire Wildcats football team was an American football team that represented the University of New Hampshire as a member of the Yankee Conference during the 1948 college football season. In its third year under head coach Bill Glassford, the team compiled a 5–3 record (3–1 against conference opponents) and won the Yankee Conference championship, outscoring opponents 155–103.

This was the first year that the rivalry game between New Hampshire and Maine saw a musket presented to the winning team—the musket was "donated by Portland alumni of the two institutions". The "Battle for the Brice-Cowell Musket" takes its name from former head coaches of the two programs; Fred Brice who coached at Maine (1921–1940) and Butch Cowell who coached at New Hampshire (1915–1936).

New Hampshire was ranked at No. 246 in the final Litkenhous Difference by Score System ratings for 1948.

The team played its home games at Lewis Field (also known as Lewis Stadium) in Durham, New Hampshire.

== Schedule ==
Date	Opponent	Site	Result	Attendance	Source
October 2	Rhode Island State	Lewis Field; Durham, NH	W 19–7	6,000	
October 9	at Maine	Alumni Field; Orono, ME (Battle for the Brice–Cowell Musket)	W 27–6		
October 16	Springfield*^{†}	Lewis Field; Durham, NH	L 0–23	6,500	
October 23	at Vermont	Centennial Field; Burlington, VT	L 0–14		
October 30	Northeastern*	Lewis Field; Durham, NH	W 48–0		
November 6	at Tufts*	Tufts Oval; Medford, MA	W 27–18		
November 13	Connecticut	Lewis Field; Durham, NH	W 20–7		
November 20	Toledo*	Lewis Field; Durham, NH	L 14–28		
*Non-conference game; ^{†}Homecoming; Source:
