= 1956 Rhode Island Rams football team =

American college football season

1956 Rhode Island Rams football
- Conference: Yankee Conference
- Record: 2–6 (1–4 Yankee)
- Head coach: Herb Maack (1st season)
- Home stadium: Meade Stadium

1956 Yankee Conference football standings
| | Conf. | | | | | Overall |
| Team | W | | L | | T | W | | L | | T |
|---|---|---|---|---|---|---|---|---|---|---|
| Connecticut $ | 3 | – | 0 | – | 1 | 6 | – | 2 | – | 1 |
| Maine | 3 | – | 1 | – | 0 | 5 | – | 2 | – | 0 |
| New Hampshire | 2 | – | 1 | – | 1 | 3 | – | 4 | – | 1 |
| Vermont | 1 | – | 2 | – | 0 | 2 | – | 5 | – | 0 |
| UMass | 1 | – | 3 | – | 0 | 2 | – | 5 | – | 1 |
| Rhode Island | 1 | – | 4 | – | 0 | 2 | – | 6 | – | 0 |
$ – Conference champion

The 1956 Rhode Island Rams football team was an American football team that represented the University of Rhode Island as a member of the Yankee Conference during the 1956 college football season. In its first season under head coach Herb Maack, the team compiled a 2–6 record (1–4 against conference opponents), finished in sixth/last place out of six teams in the Yankee Conference, and was outscored by a total of 235 to 87. The team played its home games at Meade Stadium in Kingston, Rhode Island.

== Schedule ==
| Date | Opponent | Site | Result | Source |
|---|---|---|---|---|
| September 22 | Northeastern* | Meade Stadium; Kingston, RI | W 13–12 | |
| September 29 | at Maine | Alumni Field; Orono, ME | L 7–40 | |
| October 6 | at New Hampshire | Cowell Stadium; Durham, NH | L 7–13 | |
| October 13 | Vermont | Meade Stadium; Kingtson, RI | L 13–39 | |
| October 20 | UMass | Meade Stadium; Kingston, RI | W 34–13 | |
| October 27 | at Brown* | Brown Stadium; Providence, RI (rivalry) | L 7–27 | |
| November 3 | at Springfield* | Springfield, MA | L 0–40 | |
| November 17 | Connecticut | Meade Stadium; Kingston, RI (rivalry) | L 6–51 | |
*Non-conference game
