= 1953 Rhode Island Rams football team =

American college football season

1953 Rhode Island Rams football

Yankee Conference co-champion
- Conference: Yankee Conference
- Record: 6–2 (3–1 Yankee)
- Head coach: Hal Kopp (3rd season)
- Home stadium: Meade Stadium

1953 Yankee Conference football standings
	Conf.					Overall
Team	W		L		T	W		L		T
New Hampshire +	3	–	1	–	0	6	–	2	–	0
Rhode Island +	3	–	1	–	0	6	–	2	–	0
Connecticut	2	–	1	–	1	3	–	4	–	1
Maine	1	–	2	–	1	4	–	2	–	1
Vermont	0	–	1	–	0	3	–	3	–	1
UMass	0	–	3	–	0	1	–	7	–	0
+ – Conference co-champions

The 1953 Rhode Island Rams football team was an American football team that represented the University of Rhode Island as a member of the Yankee Conference during the 1953 college football season. In its third season under head coach Hal Kopp, the team compiled a 6–2 record (3–1 against conference opponents), tied for the conference championship, and outscored opponents by a total of 148 to 100. The team played its home games at Meade Stadium in Kingston, Rhode Island.

== Schedule ==
Date	Opponent	Site	Result	Attendance	Source
September 19	Northeastern*	Meade Stadium; Kingston, RI	W 13–7		
September 26	Maine	Meade Stadium; Kingston, RI	W 13–6		
October 3	New Hampshire	Meade Stadium; Kingston, RI	L 13–14		
October 10	at Brown*	Brown Stadium; Providence, RI (rivalry)	W 19–13	8,000	
October 17	at UMass	Alumni Field; Amherst, MA	W 41–14		
October 24	at Hofstra*	Hempstead, NY	L 12–27		
October 31	Springfield*	Meade Stadium; Kingston, RI	W 18–6		
November 14	at Connecticut	Memorial Stadium; Storrs, CT (rivalry)	W 19–13		
*Non-conference game
