= 1957 Maine Black Bears football team =

American college football season

1957 Maine Black Bears football
- Conference: Yankee Conference, Maine Intercollegiate Athletic Association
- Record: 4–3 (2–2 Yankee, 2–1 MIAA)
- Head coach: Harold Westerman (7th season)
- Captain: Vernon Moulton
- Home stadium: Alumni Field

1957 Yankee Conference football standings
	Conf.					Overall
Team	W		L		T	W		L		T
Rhode Island +	3	–	0	–	1	5	–	2	–	1
Connecticut +	3	–	0	–	1	5	–	4	–	1
Maine	2	–	2	–	0	4	–	4	–	0
UMass	1	–	2	–	1	1	–	5	–	1
Vermont	0	–	2	–	0	2	–	5	–	0
New Hampshire	0	–	3	–	1	0	–	7	–	1
+ – Conference co-champions

The 1957 Maine Black Bears football team was an American football team that represented the University of Maine as a member of the Yankee Conference and Maine Intercollegiate Athletic Association during the 1957 college football season. In its seventh season under head coach Harold Westerman, the team compiled a 4–3 record (2–2 against Yankee Conference and 2–1 against MIAA opponents) and finished third out of the six teams in the Yankee Conference. The team played its home games at Alumni Field in Orono, Maine. Vernon Moulton was the team captain.

The team tallied 1,657 rushing yards and 213 passing yards. Its statistical leaders included halfback Charles Thibodeau with 312 rushing yards; quarterback Robert Pickett with 164 passing yards; end Edward Manson with 67 receiving yards; ad fullback John Theriault with 22 points scored (two touchdowns, 10 points after touchdown).

== Schedule ==
Date	Opponent	Site	Result	Attendance	Source
September 28	at Rhode Island	Meade Stadium; Kingston, RI	L 7–25		
October 5	Vermont	Alumni Field; Orono, ME	W 49–0	4,600	
October 12	at New Hampshire	Cowell Stadium; Durham, NH (rivalry)	W 7–0		
October 19	Connecticut	Alumni Field; Orono, ME	L 0–19		
October 26	at Bates	Garcelon Field; Lewiston, ME	L 0–7		
November 2	at Colby	Seaverns Field; Waterville, ME	W 14–13		
November 9	Bowdoin^{†}	Alumni Field; Orono, ME	W 40–0	7,714	
^{†}Homecoming
