= 1956 Maine Black Bears football team =

American college football season

1956 Maine Black Bears football
- Conference: Yankee Conference, Maine Intercollegiate Athletic Association
- Record: 5–2 (3–1 Yankee, 2–1 MIAA)
- Head coach: Harold Westerman (6th season)
- Captains: Thurlow Cooper; Peter Kostacopoulos
- Home stadium: Alumni Field

1956 Yankee Conference football standings
	Conf.					Overall
Team	W		L		T	W		L		T
Connecticut $	3	–	0	–	1	6	–	2	–	1
Maine	3	–	1	–	0	5	–	2	–	0
New Hampshire	2	–	1	–	1	3	–	4	–	1
Vermont	1	–	2	–	0	2	–	5	–	0
UMass	1	–	3	–	0	2	–	5	–	1
Rhode Island	1	–	4	–	0	2	–	6	–	0
$ – Conference champion

The 1956 Maine Black Bears football team was an American football team that represented the University of Maine as a member of the Yankee Conference and Maine Intercollegiate Athletic Association during the 1956 college football season. In its sixth season under head coach Harold Westerman, the team compiled a 5–2 record (3–1 against Yankee Conference and 2–1 against MIAA opponents) and finished second out of the six teams in the Yankee Conference. The team played its home games at Alumni Field in Orono, Maine. Thurlow Cooper and Peter Kostacopoulos were the team captains.

== Schedule ==
Date	Opponent	Site	Result	Attendance	Source
September 29	Rhode Island	Alumni Field; Orono, ME	W 40–7		
October 6	at Vermont	Centennial Field; Burlington, VT	W 14–0	6,500	
October 13	New Hampshire	Alumni Field; Orono, ME (rivalry)	W 29–7	6,600	
October 20	at Connecticut	Memorial Stadium; Storrs, CT	L 7–13		
October 27	Bates	Alumni Field; Orono, ME	L 13–19		
November 1	Colby	Alumni Field; Orono, ME	W 26–7		
November 8	at Bowdoin	Whittier Field; Brunswick, ME	W 33–7		
