= 1950 New Hampshire Wildcats football team =

American college football season

1950 New Hampshire Wildcats football

Yankee Conference champion
- Conference: Yankee Conference
- Record: 8–0 (4–0 Yankee)
- Head coach: Chief Boston (2nd season)
- Home stadium: Lewis Field

1950 Yankee Conference football standings
	Conf.					Overall
Team	W		L		T	W		L		T
New Hampshire $	4	–	0	–	0	8	–	0	–	0
Maine	3	–	1	–	0	5	–	1	–	1
Rhode Island State	2	–	2	–	0	3	–	5	–	0
UMass	1	–	1	–	0	3	–	5	–	0
Vermont	0	–	3	–	0	2	–	5	–	0
Connecticut	0	–	3	–	0	3	–	5	–	0
$ – Conference champion

The 1950 New Hampshire Wildcats football team was an American football team that represented the University of New Hampshire as a member of the Yankee Conference during the 1950 college football season. In its second year under head coach Chief Boston, the team compiled a perfect 8–0 record (4–0 against conference opponents), outscored opponents by a total of 236 to 53, and won the Yankee Conference championship.

The team tallied 2,424 rushing yards and 529 passing yards. On defense, they held opponents to 1,086 rushing yards and 700 passing yards.

Halfback Jack Bowes led the team in both scoring and rushing. He gained 644 yards on 124 carries for an average of 5.27 yards per carry. He scored 78 points on 13 touchdowns, including a 67-yard touchdown run against Rhode Island.

Fullback Dick Dewing rushed for 854 yards on 166 carries (5.05 yards per carry) and scored 36 points.

Guard Ed Douglas was selected as a first-team player on the Associated Press 1950 Little All-America college football team.

== Schedule ==
Date	Opponent	Site	Result	Attendance	Source
September 30	Champlain*	Lewis Field; Durham, NH	W 62–6	4,500	
October 7	Rhode Island State	Lewis Field; Durham, NH	W 27–14		
October 14	at Maine	Alumni Field; Orono, ME	W 19–0	6,000	
October 21	Springfield*^{†}	Lewis Field; Durham, NH	W 14–0	7,250	
October 28	at Vermont	Centennial Field; Burlington, VT	W 47–0		
November 4	Connecticut	Lewis Field; Durham, NH	W 21–7		
November 11	at Tufts*	The Oval; Medford, MA	W 33–19	9,000	
November 18	Kent State*	Lewis Field; Durham, NH	W 13–7	7,000	
*Non-conference game; ^{†}Homecoming
