= 1948 Vermont Catamounts football team =

American college football season

1948 Vermont Catamounts football
- Conference: Yankee Conference
- Record: 4–3–1 (1–1 Yankee)
- Head coach: John C. Evans (6th season)
- Home stadium: Centennial Field

1948 Yankee Conference football standings
	Conf.					Overall
Team	W		L		T	W		L		T
New Hampshire $	3	–	1	–	0	5	–	3	–	0
Connecticut	2	–	1	–	0	3	–	5	–	0
Vermont	1	–	1	–	0	4	–	3	–	1
UMass	1	–	1	–	1	3	–	4	–	1
Maine	1	–	2	–	0	4	–	3	–	0
Rhode Island State	1	–	3	–	0	2	–	4	–	1
$ – Conference champion

The 1948 Vermont Catamounts football team was an American football team that represented the University of Vermont in the Yankee Conference during the 1948 college football season. In their sixth year under head coach John C. Evans, the team compiled a 4–3–1 record.

== Schedule ==
Date	Opponent	Site	Result	Attendance	Source
September 25	Saint Michael's*	Centennial Field; Burlington, VT	L 13–2	5,000	
October 2	at St. Lawrence*	Weeks Field; Canton, NY	W 7–0		
October 9	Union (NY)*	Centennial Field; Burlington, VT	W 7–6	3,500	
October 16	at Norwich*	Sabine Field; Northfield, VT	W 14–0	3,000	
October 23	New Hampshire	Centennial Field; Burlington, VT	W 14–0		
October 30	at UMass	Alumni Field; Amherst, MA	L 0–33	3,000	
November 6	Rochester*	Centennial Field; Burlington, VT	T 14–14		
November 13	Middlebury*	Centennial Field; Burlington, VT	L 12–13	7,000	
*Non-conference game
