= 1950 Connecticut Huskies football team =

American college football season

1950 Connecticut Huskies football
- Conference: Yankee Conference
- Record: 3–5 (0–3 Yankee)
- Head coach: Arthur Valpey (1st season)
- Home stadium: Gardner Dow Athletic Fields

1950 Yankee Conference football standings
| | Conf. | | | | | Overall |
| Team | W | | L | | T | W | | L | | T |
|---|---|---|---|---|---|---|---|---|---|---|
| New Hampshire $ | 4 | – | 0 | – | 0 | 8 | – | 0 | – | 0 |
| Maine | 3 | – | 1 | – | 0 | 5 | – | 1 | – | 1 |
| Rhode Island State | 2 | – | 2 | – | 0 | 3 | – | 5 | – | 0 |
| UMass | 1 | – | 1 | – | 0 | 3 | – | 5 | – | 0 |
| Vermont | 0 | – | 3 | – | 0 | 2 | – | 5 | – | 0 |
| Connecticut | 0 | – | 3 | – | 0 | 3 | – | 5 | – | 0 |
$ – Conference champion

The 1950 Connecticut Huskies football team represented the University of Connecticut in the 1950 college football season. The Huskies were led by first-year head coach Arthur Valpey, and completed the season with a record of 3–5.

== Schedule ==
| Date | Opponent | Site | Result | Attendance | Source |
|---|---|---|---|---|---|
| September 23 | at Yale* | Yale Bowl; New Haven, CT | L 0–25 | 24,000 | |
| September 30 | American International* | Gardner Dow Athletic Fields; Storrs, CT | L 14–25 | | |
| October 7 | Ohio Wesleyan* | Gardner Dow Athletic Fields; Storrs, CT | W 20–14 | | |
| October 14 | at Springfield* | Springfield, MA | W 13–12 | | |
| October 21 | Maine | Gardner Dow Athletic Fields; Storrs, CT | L 7–16 | | |
| October 28 | NYU* | Gardner Dow Athletic Fields; Storrs, CT | W 14–7 | 8,000 | |
| November 4 | at New Hampshire | Lewis Field; Durham, NH | L 7–21 | | |
| November 18 | at Rhode Island State | Meade Stadium; Kingston, RI (rivalry) | L 7–14 | | |
*Non-conference game
