= 1994 Villanova Wildcats football team =

American college football season

1994 Villanova Wildcats football
- Conference: Yankee Conference
- Record: 5–6 (2–6 Yankee)
- Head coach: Andy Talley (10th season)
- Defensive coordinator: Dan MacNeill (7th season)
- Home stadium: Villanova Stadium

1994 Yankee Conference football standings
	Conf.					Overall
Team	W		L		T	W		L		T
New England Division
No. 12 New Hampshire x$^	8	–	0	–	0	10	–	2	–	0
No. 9 Boston University ^	6	–	2	–	0	9	–	3	–	0
Connecticut	4	–	4	–	0	4	–	7	–	0
UMass	4	–	4	–	0	5	–	6	–	0
Rhode Island	2	–	6	–	0	2	–	9	–	0
Maine	2	–	6	–	0	3	–	8	–	0
Mid-Atlantic Division
No. 13 James Madison x^	6	–	2	–	0	10	–	3	–	0
No. 19 William & Mary x	6	–	2	–	0	8	–	3	–	0
Delaware	5	–	3	–	0	7	–	3	–	1
Villanova	2	–	6	–	0	5	–	6	–	0
Northeastern	2	–	6	–	0	2	–	9	–	0
Richmond	1	–	7	–	0	3	–	8	–	0
$ – Conference champion; x – Division champion/co-champions; ^ – NCAA Division I-AA playoff participant; Rankings from The Sports Network poll

The 1994 Villanova Wildcats football team was an American football team that represented the Villanova University as a member of the Yankee Conference during the 1994 NCAA Division I-AA football season. In their tenth year under head coach Andy Talley, the team compiled a 5–6 record.

== Schedule ==
Date	Opponent	Site	Result	Attendance	Source
September 3	at Fordham*	Coffey Field; Bronx, NY	W 23–7	4,243	
September 9	Liberty*	Villanova Stadium; Villanova, PA	W 16–13	11,256	
September 17	Delaware	Villanova Stadium; Villanova, PA (rivalry)	L 31–38 ^{OT}	9,175	
September 24	No. 6 Boston University	Villanova Stadium; Villanova, PA	L 15–30	11,957	
October 1	Richmond	Villanova Stadium; Villanova, PA	W 38–6	9,343	
October 8	at Connecticut	Memorial Stadium; Storrs, CT	L 10–26	14,371	
October 15	at No. 17 James Madison	Bridgeforth Stadium; Harrisonburg, VA	L 23–31	15,000	
October 22	at Northeastern	Parsons Field; Brookline, MA	W 13–9	6,250	
October 29	No. 23 William & Mary	Villanova Stadium; Villanova, PA	L 28–53	6,735	
November 5	West Chester*	Villanova Stadium; Villanova, PA	W 35–14	5,911	
November 12	at No. 19 New Hampshire	Cowell Stadium; Durham, NH	L 14–21	8,863	
*Non-conference game; Rankings from The Sports Network Poll released prior to the game
