= 1948 Rhode Island State Rams football team =

American college football season

1948 Rhode Island State Rams football
- Conference: Yankee Conference
- Record: 2–4–1 (1–3 Yankee)
- Head coach: Bill Beck (4th season)
- Home stadium: Meade Field

1948 Yankee Conference football standings
	Conf.					Overall
Team	W		L		T	W		L		T
New Hampshire $	3	–	1	–	0	5	–	3	–	0
Connecticut	2	–	1	–	0	3	–	5	–	0
Vermont	1	–	1	–	0	4	–	3	–	1
UMass	1	–	1	–	1	3	–	4	–	1
Maine	1	–	2	–	0	4	–	3	–	0
Rhode Island State	1	–	3	–	0	2	–	4	–	1
$ – Conference champion

The 1948 Rhode Island Rams football team was an American football team that represented Rhode Island State College (later renamed the University of Rhode Island) as a member of the Yankee Conference during the 1948 college football season. In its fourth season under head coach Bill Beck, the team compiled a 2–4–1 record (1–3 against conference opponents) and finished in last place in the conference. The team played its home games at Meade Field in Kingston, Rhode Island.

== Schedule ==
Date	Opponent	Site	Result	Attendance	Source
September 18	Quonset Air Station*	Meade Field; Kingston, RI	W 56–0		
September 25	at Maine	Orono, ME	L 7–13		
October 2	at New Hampshire	Lewis Field; Durham, NH	L 7–19	6,000	
October 9	at Brown*	Brown Field; Providence, RI (rivalry)	L 0–33	11,000	
October 16	UMass	Meade Field; Kingston RI	W 19–12	2,500	
October 30	at Springfield*	Springfield, MA	T 21–21	4,000	
November 6	Connecticut^{†}	Meade Field; Kingston, RI (rivalry)	L 6–28		
*Non-conference game; ^{†}Homecoming
