= 1957 Vermont Catamounts football team =

American college football season

1957 Vermont Catamounts football
- Conference: Yankee Conference
- Record: 2–5 (0–2 Yankee)
- Head coach: J. Edward Donnelly (6th season)
- Home stadium: Centennial Field

1957 Yankee Conference football standings
	Conf.					Overall
Team	W		L		T	W		L		T
Rhode Island +	3	–	0	–	1	5	–	2	–	1
Connecticut +	3	–	0	–	1	5	–	4	–	1
Maine	2	–	2	–	0	4	–	4	–	0
UMass	1	–	2	–	1	1	–	5	–	1
Vermont	0	–	2	–	0	2	–	5	–	0
New Hampshire	0	–	3	–	1	0	–	7	–	1
+ – Conference co-champions

The 1957 Vermont Catamounts football team was an American football team that represented the University of Vermont in the Yankee Conference during the 1957 college football season. In their sixth year under head coach J. Edward Donnelly, the team compiled a 2–5 record.

== Schedule ==
Date	Opponent	Site	Result	Attendance	Source
September 28	Union (NY)*	Centennial Field; Burlington, VT	W 26–6	5,000	
October 5	at Maine	Alumni Field; Orono, ME	L 0–49	4,600	
October 12	Dartmouth B*	Centennial Field; Burlington, VT	W 18–6		
October 19	Rochester*	Centennial Field; Burlington, VT	L 6–14		
October 26	Norwich*	Centennial Field; Burlington, VT	L 12–19		
November 2	at UMass	Alumni Field; Amherst, MA	L 13–14	2,700	
November 9	at Middlebury*	Porter Field; Middlebury, VT	L 7–13	4,000	
*Non-conference game
