= 1953 UMass Redmen football team =

American college football season

1953 UMass Redmen football
- Conference: Yankee Conference
- Record: 1–7 (0–3 Yankee)
- Head coach: Charlie O'Rourke (2nd season)
- Home stadium: Alumni Field

1953 Yankee Conference football standings
	Conf.					Overall
Team	W		L		T	W		L		T
New Hampshire +	3	–	1	–	0	6	–	2	–	0
Rhode Island +	3	–	1	–	0	6	–	2	–	0
Connecticut	2	–	1	–	1	3	–	4	–	1
Maine	1	–	2	–	1	4	–	2	–	1
Vermont	0	–	1	–	0	3	–	3	–	1
UMass	0	–	3	–	0	1	–	7	–	0
+ – Conference co-champions

The 1953 UMass Redmen football team represented the University of Massachusetts Amherst in the 1953 college football season as a member of the Yankee Conference. The team was coached by Charlie O'Rourke and played its home games at Alumni Field in Amherst, Massachusetts. UMass finished the season with a record of 1–7 overall and 0–3 in conference play.

== Schedule ==
Date	Opponent	Site	Result
September 26	at Bates*	Garcelon Field; Lewiston, ME	W 34–12
October 3	Connecticut	Alumni Field; Amherst, MA (rivalry)	L 0–41
October 10	at Springfield*	Pratt Field; Springfield, MA	L 7–20
October 17	Rhode Island	Alumni Field; Amherst, MA	L 14–41
October 24	at Northeastern*	Kent Street Field; Brookline, MA	L 14–41
October 31	Brandeis*	Alumni Field; Amherst, MA	L 14–38
November 14	Tufts*	Alumni Field; Amherst, MA	L 6–14
November 21	at New Hampshire	Cowell Stadium; Durham, NH (rivalry)	L 12–32
*Non-conference game
