= 1957 UMass Redmen football team =

American college football season

1957 UMass Redmen football
- Conference: Yankee Conference
- Record: 1–5–1 (1–2–1 Yankee)
- Head coach: Charlie O'Rourke (6th season)
- Home stadium: Alumni Field

1957 Yankee Conference football standings
	Conf.					Overall
Team	W		L		T	W		L		T
Rhode Island +	3	–	0	–	1	5	–	2	–	1
Connecticut +	3	–	0	–	1	5	–	4	–	1
Maine	2	–	2	–	0	4	–	4	–	0
UMass	1	–	2	–	1	1	–	5	–	1
Vermont	0	–	2	–	0	2	–	5	–	0
New Hampshire	0	–	3	–	1	0	–	7	–	1
+ – Conference co-champions

The 1957 UMass Redmen football team represented the University of Massachusetts Amherst in the 1957 college football season as a member of the Yankee Conference. The team was coached by Charlie O'Rourke and played its home games at Alumni Field in Amherst, Massachusetts. UMass finished the season with a record of 1–5–1 overall and 1–2–1 in conference play.

== Schedule ==
Date	Opponent	Site	Result	Attendance	Source
September 21	American International*	Alumni Field; Amherst, MA	L 7–19		
September 28	at Boston University*	Boston University Field; Boston, MA	L 6–66		
October 12	at Connecticut	Memorial Stadium; Storrs, CT (rivalry)	L 6–19		
October 19	Rhode Island	Alumni Field; Amherst, MA	L 13–27		
November 2	Vermont	Alumni Field; Amherst, MA	W 14–13	2,700	
November 9	at Brandeis*	Brandeis Stadium; Waltham, MA	L 7–47		
November 16	at New Hampshire	Cowell Stadium; Durham, NH (rivalry)	T 7–7		
*Non-conference game
