= 1957 New Hampshire Wildcats football team =

American college football season

1957 New Hampshire Wildcats football
- Conference: Yankee Conference
- Record: 0–7–1 (0–3–1 Yankee)
- Head coach: Chief Boston (9th season)
- Home stadium: Cowell Stadium

1957 Yankee Conference football standings
	Conf.					Overall
Team	W		L		T	W		L		T
Rhode Island +	3	–	0	–	1	5	–	2	–	1
Connecticut +	3	–	0	–	1	5	–	4	–	1
Maine	2	–	2	–	0	4	–	4	–	0
UMass	1	–	2	–	1	1	–	5	–	1
Vermont	0	–	2	–	0	2	–	5	–	0
New Hampshire	0	–	3	–	1	0	–	7	–	1
+ – Conference co-champions

The 1957 New Hampshire Wildcats football team was an American football team that represented the University of New Hampshire as a member of the Yankee Conference during the 1957 college football season. In its ninth year under head coach Chief Boston, the team compiled a 0–7–1 record (0–3–1 against conference opponents) and finished last out of six teams in the Yankee Conference.

== Schedule ==
Date	Opponent	Site	Result	Attendance	Source
September 28	at Dartmouth*	Memorial Field; Hanover, NH (rivalry)	L 0–27	11,800	
October 5	at Rhode Island	Meade Stadium; Kingston, RI	L 13–28		
October 12	Maine	Cowell Stadium; Durham, NH (Battle for the Brice–Cowell Musket)	L 0–7		
October 19	at Delaware*	Delaware Stadium; Newark, DE	L 6–59	6,200	
October 26	Brandeis*	Cowell Stadium; Durham, NH	L 0–27		
November 2	at Connecticut	Memorial Stadium; Storrs, CT	L 0–18		
November 9	at Springfield*	Springfield, MA	L 6–28		
November 16	UMass	Cowell Stadium; Durham, NH (rivalry)	T 7–7		
*Non-conference game
