= 1953 Connecticut Huskies football team =

American college football season

1953 Connecticut Huskies football
- Conference: Yankee Conference
- Record: 3–4–1 (2–1 Yankee)
- Head coach: Bob Ingalls (2nd season)
- Home stadium: Memorial Stadium

1953 Yankee Conference football standings
	Conf.					Overall
Team	W		L		T	W		L		T
New Hampshire +	3	–	1	–	0	6	–	2	–	0
Rhode Island +	3	–	1	–	0	6	–	2	–	0
Connecticut	2	–	1	–	1	3	–	4	–	1
Maine	1	–	2	–	1	4	–	2	–	1
Vermont	0	–	1	–	0	3	–	3	–	1
UMass	0	–	3	–	0	1	–	7	–	0
+ – Conference co-champions

The 1953 Connecticut Huskies football team represented the University of Connecticut in the 1953 college football season. The Huskies were led by second-year head coach Bob Ingalls, and completed the season with a record of 3–4–1. For the first time, home games were played at Memorial Stadium, which replaced the Gardner Dow Athletic Fields as the Huskies' home venue.

== Schedule ==
Date	Opponent	Site	Result	Attendance	Source
September 26	at Yale*	Yale Bowl; New Haven, CT	L 0–32	20,000	
October 3	at UMass	Alumni Field; Amherst, MA (rivalry)	W 41–0		
October 10	St. Lawrence*	Memorial Stadium; Storrs, CT	W 26–6		
October 17	at Maine	Orono, ME	T 18–18		
October 24	Delaware*	Memorial Stadium; Storrs, CT	L 7–30	10,800	
October 31	New Hampshire	Memorial Stadium; Storrs, CT	W 6–0		
November 7	at Brown*	Brown Stadium; Providence, RI	L 7–42	3,000	
November 14	Rhode Island	Memorial Stadium; Storrs, CT (rivalry)	L 13–19		
*Non-conference game
