= 1950 Rhode Island State Rams football team =

American college football season

1950 Rhode Island State Rams football
- Conference: Yankee Conference
- Record: 3–5 (2–3 Yankee)
- Head coach: Hal Kopp (1st season)
- Home stadium: Meade Stadium

1950 Yankee Conference football standings
	Conf.					Overall
Team	W		L		T	W		L		T
New Hampshire $	4	–	0	–	0	8	–	0	–	0
Maine	3	–	1	–	0	5	–	1	–	1
Rhode Island State	2	–	2	–	0	3	–	5	–	0
UMass	1	–	1	–	0	3	–	5	–	0
Vermont	0	–	3	–	0	2	–	5	–	0
Connecticut	0	–	3	–	0	3	–	5	–	0
$ – Conference champion

The 1950 Rhode Island Rams football team was an American football team that represented Rhode Island State College (later renamed the University of Rhode Island) as a member of the Yankee Conference during the 1950 college football season. In its first season under head coach Hal Kopp, the team compiled a 3–5 record (2–3 against conference opponents) and finished in third place in the conference. The team played its home games at Meade Stadium in Kingston, Rhode Island.

== Schedule ==
Date	Opponent	Site	Result	Attendance	Source
September 23	Bates*		W 34–7		
September 30	at Maine		L 0–13		
October 7	at New Hampshire		L 14–27		
October 14	at Brown*	Providence, RI (rivalry)	L 13–55		
October 21	Massachusetts		W 38–27		
October 28	at Buffalo*		L 12–33	< 2,000	
November 4	at Springfield*		L 0–32		
November 18	Connecticut^{†}	(rivalry)	W 14–7		
*Non-conference game; ^{†}Homecoming
