= 1948 UMass Redmen football team =

American college football season

1948 UMass Redmen football
- Conference: Yankee Conference
- Record: 3–4–1 (1–1 Yankee)
- Head coach: Thomas Eck (3rd season)
- Home stadium: Alumni Field

1948 Yankee Conference football standings
	Conf.					Overall
Team	W		L		T	W		L		T
New Hampshire $	3	–	1	–	0	5	–	3	–	0
Connecticut	2	–	1	–	0	3	–	5	–	0
Vermont	1	–	1	–	0	4	–	3	–	1
UMass	1	–	1	–	1	3	–	4	–	1
Maine	1	–	2	–	0	4	–	3	–	0
Rhode Island State	1	–	3	–	0	2	–	4	–	1
$ – Conference champion

The 1948 UMass Redmen football team represented the University of Massachusetts Amherst in the 1948 college football season as a member of the Yankee Conference. The team was coached by Thomas Eck and played its home games at Alumni Field in Amherst, Massachusetts. UMass finished the season with a record of 3–4–1 overall and 1–1 in conference play.

== Schedule ==
Date	Opponent	Site	Result	Attendance	Source
September 25	Bates*	Alumni Field; Amherst, MA	W 7–6		
October 2	at Norwich*	Sabine Field; Northfield, VT	L 19–27		
October 9	Worcester Tech*	Alumni Field; Amherst, MA	W 26–7		
October 16	at Rhode Island State	Meade Stadium; Kingston, RI	L 12–19	2,500	
October 23	at Fort Devens*	Devens, MA	L 14–20		
October 30	Vermont	Alumni Field; Amherst, MA	W 33–0	3,000	
November 6	Springfield*	Alumni Field; Amherst, MA	L 0–31		
November 13	at Tufts*	Tufts Oval; Somerville, MA	T 13–13		
*Non-conference game
