= 1954 Vermont Catamounts football team =

American college football season

1954 Vermont Catamounts football
- Conference: Yankee Conference
- Record: 5–1–1 (1–1 Yankee)
- Head coach: J. Edward Donnelly (3rd season)
- Home stadium: Centennial Field

1954 Yankee Conference football standings
	Conf.					Overall
Team	W		L		T	W		L		T
New Hampshire $	4	–	0	–	0	7	–	1	–	0
Rhode Island	3	–	1	–	0	6	–	2	–	0
Maine	2	–	2	–	0	5	–	2	–	0
Vermont	1	–	1	–	0	5	–	1	–	1
UMass	1	–	3	–	0	4	–	4	–	0
Connecticut	0	–	4	–	0	1	–	8	–	0
$ – Conference champion

The 1954 Vermont Catamounts football team was an American football team that represented the University of Vermont in the Yankee Conference during the 1954 college football season. In their third year under head coach J. Edward Donnelly, the team compiled a 5–1–1 record.

== Schedule ==
Date	Opponent	Site	Result	Attendance	Source
September 25	at Union (NY)*	Alexander Field; Schenectady, NY	T 14–14		
October 2	Maine^{†}	Centennial Field; Burlington, VT	L 20–23	6,500	
October 9	Dartmouth B*	Centennial Field; Burlington, VT	W 19–12		
October 16	at Rochester*	Fauver Stadium; Rochester, NY	W 19–12		
October 23	at Norwich*	Sabine Field; Northfield, VT	W 41–0		
October 30	UMass	Centennial Field; Burlington, VT	W 27–25	7,500	
November 6	Middlebury*	Centennial Field; Burlington, VT	W 30–6	8,500	
*Non-conference game; ^{†}Homecoming
