= 1994 UMass Minutemen football team =

American college football season

1994 UMass Minutemen football
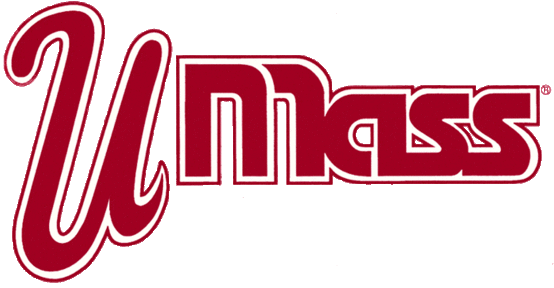
- Conference: Yankee Conference
- New England Division
- Record: 5–6 (4–4 Yankee)
- Head coach: Mike Hodges (3rd season)
- Defensive coordinator: Jerry Azzinaro (1st season)
- Home stadium: Warren McGuirk Alumni Stadium

1994 Yankee Conference football standings
	Conf.					Overall
Team	W		L		T	W		L		T
New England Division
No. 12 New Hampshire x$^	8	–	0	–	0	10	–	2	–	0
No. 9 Boston University ^	6	–	2	–	0	9	–	3	–	0
Connecticut	4	–	4	–	0	4	–	7	–	0
UMass	4	–	4	–	0	5	–	6	–	0
Rhode Island	2	–	6	–	0	2	–	9	–	0
Maine	2	–	6	–	0	3	–	8	–	0
Mid-Atlantic Division
No. 13 James Madison x^	6	–	2	–	0	10	–	3	–	0
No. 19 William & Mary x	6	–	2	–	0	8	–	3	–	0
Delaware	5	–	3	–	0	7	–	3	–	1
Villanova	2	–	6	–	0	5	–	6	–	0
Northeastern	2	–	6	–	0	2	–	9	–	0
Richmond	1	–	7	–	0	3	–	8	–	0
$ – Conference champion; x – Division champion/co-champions; ^ – NCAA Division I-AA playoff participant; Rankings from The Sports Network poll

The 1994 UMass Minutemen football team represented the University of Massachusetts Amherst in the 1994 NCAA Division I-AA football season as a member of the Atlantic 10 Conference. The team was coached by Mike Hodges and played its home games at Warren McGuirk Alumni Stadium in Hadley, Massachusetts. UMass finished the season with a record of 5–6 overall and 4–4 in conference play.

== Schedule ==
Date	Opponent	Rank	Site	Result	Attendance	Source
September 10	at Richmond*	No. 25	UR Stadium; Richmond, VA	L 13–14	9,822	
September 17	at Holy Cross*		Fitton Field; Worcester, MA	W 32–0	12,271	
September 24	Maine		McGuirk Stadium; Hadley, MA	W 20–14	14,873	
October 1	at Rhode Island^{†}		McGuirk Stadium; Hadley, MA	W 22–12	10,812	
October 8	at New Hampshire		Cowell Stadium; Durham, NH (rivalry)	L 11–14	9,018	
October 15	at No. 7 William & Mary		Zable Stadium; Williamsburg, VA	W 23–14	9,042	
October 22	at Delaware		Delaware Stadium; Newark, DE	L 14–52	18,978	
October 29	No. 8 Boston University		McGuirk Stadium; Hadley, MA	L 24–28	15,184	
November 5	Northeastern		McGuirk Stadium; Hadley, MA	W 27–24	6,511	
November 12	No. 1 Youngstown State*		McGuirk Stadium; Hadley, MA	L 9–28	6,150	
November 19	Connecticut		McGuirk Stadium; Hadley, MA (rivalry)	L 13–21	7,296	
*Non-conference game; ^{†}Homecoming; Rankings from The Sports Network Poll released prior to the game
