= 1994 Boston University Terriers football team =

American college football season

1994 Boston University Terriers football

NCAA Division I-AA Quarterfinal, L 23–30 at Eastern Kentucky
- Conference: Yankee Conference
- New England Division

Ranking
- Sports Network: No. 9
- Record: 9–3 (6–2 Yankee)
- Head coach: Dan Allen (5th season)
- Defensive coordinator: Tom Masella (2nd season)
- Home stadium: Nickerson Field

1994 Yankee Conference football standings
	Conf.					Overall
Team	W		L		T	W		L		T
New England Division
No. 12 New Hampshire x$^	8	–	0	–	0	10	–	2	–	0
No. 9 Boston University ^	6	–	2	–	0	9	–	3	–	0
Connecticut	4	–	4	–	0	4	–	7	–	0
UMass	4	–	4	–	0	5	–	6	–	0
Rhode Island	2	–	6	–	0	2	–	9	–	0
Maine	2	–	6	–	0	3	–	8	–	0
Mid-Atlantic Division
No. 13 James Madison x^	6	–	2	–	0	10	–	3	–	0
No. 19 William & Mary x	6	–	2	–	0	8	–	3	–	0
Delaware	5	–	3	–	0	7	–	3	–	1
Villanova	2	–	6	–	0	5	–	6	–	0
Northeastern	2	–	6	–	0	2	–	9	–	0
Richmond	1	–	7	–	0	3	–	8	–	0
$ – Conference champion; x – Division champion/co-champions; ^ – NCAA Division I-AA playoff participant; Rankings from The Sports Network poll

The 1994 Boston University Terriers football team was an American football team that represented Boston University as a member of the Yankee Conference during the 1994 NCAA Division I-AA football season. In their fifth season under head coach Dan Allen, the Terriers compiled a 9–3 record (6–2 against conference opponents), finished second in the New England Division of the Yankee Conference, lost to Eastern Kentucky in the first round of the (NCAA Division I-AA playoffs, and outscored opponents by a total of 396 to 252.

== Schedule ==
Date	Opponent	Rank	Site	Result	Attendance	Source
September 10	at Colgate*	No. 10	Andy Kerr Stadium; Hamilton, NY	W 45–7		
September 17	at Maine	No. 7	Alumni Field; Orono, ME	W 31–18		
September 24	at Villanova	No. 6	Villanova Stadium; Villanova, PA	W 30–15	11,957	
October 1	James Madison	No. 7	Nickerson Field; Boston, MA	L 21–24	7,809	
October 8	at Rhode Island	No. 12	Meade Stadium; Kingston, RI	W 45–23	3,714	
October 15	Northeastern	No. 10	Nickerson Field; Boston, MA	W 35–14		
October 22	Richmond	No. 7	Nickerson Field; Boston, MA	W 40–24	10,533	
October 29	at UMass	No. 8	McGuirk Stadium; Hadley, MA	W 28–24	15,184	
November 5	Connecticut	No. 7	Nickerson Field; Boston, MA	W 26–9	7,064	
November 12	at Army*	No. 7	Michie Stadium; West Point, NY	W 21–12	33,762	
November 19	No. 17 New Hampshire	No. 4	Nickerson Field; Boston, MA	L 51–52 ^{2OT}		
November 26	at No. 4 Eastern Kentucky*	No. 9	Roy Kidd Stadium; Richmond, KY (NCAA Division I-AA First Round)	L 23–30		
*Non-conference game; Rankings from The Sports Network Poll released prior to the game
