= 1948 Maine Black Bears football team =

American college football season

1948 Maine Black Bears football
- Conference: Yankee Conference
- Record: 4–3 (1–2 Yankee)
- Head coach: George E. Allen (4th season)
- Captain: Alton Sproul Jr.
- Home stadium: Alumni Field

1948 Yankee Conference football standings
	Conf.					Overall
Team	W		L		T	W		L		T
New Hampshire $	3	–	1	–	0	5	–	3	–	0
Connecticut	2	–	1	–	0	3	–	5	–	0
Vermont	1	–	1	–	0	4	–	3	–	1
UMass	1	–	1	–	1	3	–	4	–	1
Maine	1	–	2	–	0	4	–	3	–	0
Rhode Island State	1	–	3	–	0	2	–	4	–	1
$ – Conference champion

The 1948 Maine Black Bears football team was an American football team that represented the University of Maine as a member of the Yankee Conference during the 1948 college football season. In its fourth and final season under head coach George E. Allen, the team compiled a 4–3 record (1–2 against conference opponents) and finished fifth in the conference. Alton Sproul Jr. was the team captain. The team played its home games at Alumni Field in Orono, Maine.

== Schedule ==
Date	Opponent	Site	Result	Attendance	Source
September 25	at Rhode Island State	Meade Field; Kingston, RI	W 13–7		
October 2	at Northeastern*	Huntington Field; Brookline, MA	W 19–6		
October 9	New Hampshire	Alumni Field; Orono, ME (rivalry)	L 6–27		
October 16	at Connecticut	Gardner Dow Field; Storrs, CT	L 6–34	6,200	
October 23	Bates*	Alumni Field; Orono, ME	L 0–31		
October 30	Colby*	Alumni Field; Orono, ME	W 21–0		
November 6	at Bowdoin*	Brunswick, ME	W 7–6		
*Non-conference game
