= 1957 Rhode Island Rams football team =

American college football season

1957 Rhode Island Rams football

Yankee Conference co-champion
- Conference: Yankee Conference
- Record: 5–2–1 (3–0–1 Yankee)
- Head coach: Herb Maack (2nd season)
- Home stadium: Meade Stadium

1957 Yankee Conference football standings
	Conf.					Overall
Team	W		L		T	W		L		T
Rhode Island +	3	–	0	–	1	5	–	2	–	1
Connecticut +	3	–	0	–	1	5	–	4	–	1
Maine	2	–	2	–	0	4	–	4	–	0
UMass	1	–	2	–	1	1	–	5	–	1
Vermont	0	–	2	–	0	2	–	5	–	0
New Hampshire	0	–	3	–	1	0	–	7	–	1
+ – Conference co-champions

The 1957 Rhode Island Rams football team was an American football team that represented the University of Rhode Island as a member of the Yankee Conference during the 1957 college football season. In its second season under head coach Herb Maack, the team compiled a 5–2–1 record (3–0–1 against conference opponents), tied with Connecticut for the Yankee Conference championship, and outscored opponents by a total of 131 to 82. The team played its home games at Meade Stadium in Kingston, Rhode Island.

== Schedule ==
Date	Opponent	Site	Result	Attendance	Source
September 21	at Northeastern*	Boston, MA	W 12–7		
September 28	Maine	Meade Stadium; Kingston, RI	W 25–7		
October 5	New Hampshire	Meade Stadium; Kingston, RI	W 28–13		
October 12	at Brandeis*	Waltham, MA	W 32–7		
October 19	at UMass	Alumni Field; Amherst, MA	W 27–13		
October 26	at Brown*	Brown Stadium; Providence, RI (rivalry)	L 7–21	18,500	
November 2	Springfield*	Meade Stadium; Kingston, RI	L 0–14		
November 16	at Connecticut	Memorial Stadium; Storrs, CT (rivalry)	T 0–0		
*Non-conference game
