= 1994 New Hampshire Wildcats football team =

American college football season

1994 New Hampshire Wildcats football

Yankee champion Yankee New England Division champion

NCAA Division I-AA first round, L 10–17 vs. Appalachian State
- Conference: Yankee Conference
- New England Division

Ranking
- Sports Network: No. 12
- Record: 10–2 (8–0 Yankee)
- Head coach: Bill Bowes (23rd season)
- Offensive coordinator: Sean McDonnell (1st season)
- Home stadium: Cowell Stadium

1994 Yankee Conference football standings
	Conf.					Overall
Team	W		L		T	W		L		T
New England Division
No. 12 New Hampshire x$^	8	–	0	–	0	10	–	2	–	0
No. 9 Boston University ^	6	–	2	–	0	9	–	3	–	0
Connecticut	4	–	4	–	0	4	–	7	–	0
UMass	4	–	4	–	0	5	–	6	–	0
Rhode Island	2	–	6	–	0	2	–	9	–	0
Maine	2	–	6	–	0	3	–	8	–	0
Mid-Atlantic Division
No. 13 James Madison x^	6	–	2	–	0	10	–	3	–	0
No. 19 William & Mary x	6	–	2	–	0	8	–	3	–	0
Delaware	5	–	3	–	0	7	–	3	–	1
Villanova	2	–	6	–	0	5	–	6	–	0
Northeastern	2	–	6	–	0	2	–	9	–	0
Richmond	1	–	7	–	0	3	–	8	–	0
$ – Conference champion; x – Division champion/co-champions; ^ – NCAA Division I-AA playoff participant; Rankings from The Sports Network poll

The 1994 New Hampshire Wildcats football team was an American football team that represented the University of New Hampshire as a member of the New England Division of the Yankee Conference during the 1994 NCAA Division I-AA football season. In their 23rd year under head coach Bill Bowes, the Wildcats compiled a 10–2 record (8–0 in conference games), and outscored opponents by a total of 299 to 209. They won the Yankee Conference championship, and lost to Appalachian State in the first round of the NCAA Division I-AA playoffs.

The team was led on offense by senior quarterback Jim Stayer (61% pass completion, 12 touchdown passes, four interceptions) and running back Avrom Smith. Four New Hampshire players received first-team honors on the 1994 All-Yankee Conference team: linebacker Warren Armes; defensive back Jim Concannon; defensive linemen Joe Fleming and Mike Foley. Second-team honors were received by running back Avrom Smith; offensive linemen Chris Bourdon and Matt Gibby; and return specialist Calvin Jones. Third-team honors were received by defensive back Rob McCoy; offensive lineman Keith Novak; and tight end Jeff Tamulski. Bill Bowes won honors as the Yankee Conference coach of the year, New England coach of the year, and AFCA Division I-AA Region 1 coach of the year.

Warren Armes, Jim Concannon, and Mike Foley also won All-New England honors.

The team played its home games at Cowell Stadium in Durham, New Hampshire.

== Schedule ==
Date	Opponent	Rank	Site	Result	Attendance	Source
September 10	at Northeastern		Parsons Field; Brookline, MA	W 28–7		
September 17	No. 19 James Madison		Cowell Stadium; Durham, NH	W 27–24	6,173	
September 24	Connecticut		Cowell Stadium; Durham, NH	W 20–19		
October 1	at Hofstra*	No. 21	Hofstra Stadium; Hempstead, NY	L 6–28		
October 8	UMass		Cowell Stadium; Durham, NH (rivalry)	W 14–11	9,018	
October 15	Lehigh*		Cowell Stadium; Durham, NH	W 42–10	13,301	
October 22	at Maine	No. 25	Alumni Field; Orono, ME (rivalry)	W 24–7	4,028	
October 29	at Rhode Island	No. 22	Meade Stadium; Kingston, RI	W 13–7	5,239	
November 5	at Richmond	No. 19	UR Stadium; Richmond, VA	W 42–14	3,069	
November 12	Villanova	No. 19	Cowell Stadium; Durham, NH	W 21–14	8,863	
November 19	at No. 4 Boston University	No. 17	Nickerson Field; Boston, MA	W 52–51 ^{2OT}		
November 26	No. 17 Appalachian State	No. 12	Cowell Stadium; Durham, NH (NCAA Division I-AA First Round)	L 10–17 ^{OT}		
*Non-conference game; Rankings from The Sports Network Poll released prior to the game
