= 1994 Rhode Island Rams football team =

American college football season

1994 Rhode Island Rams football
- Conference: Yankee Conference
- New England Division
- Record: 2–9 (2–6 Yankee)
- Head coach: Floyd Keith (2nd season)
- Defensive coordinator: Mike Mallory (2nd season)
- Home stadium: Meade Stadium

1994 Yankee Conference football standings
	Conf.					Overall
Team	W		L		T	W		L		T
New England Division
No. 12 New Hampshire x$^	8	–	0	–	0	10	–	2	–	0
No. 9 Boston University ^	6	–	2	–	0	9	–	3	–	0
Connecticut	4	–	4	–	0	4	–	7	–	0
UMass	4	–	4	–	0	5	–	6	–	0
Rhode Island	2	–	6	–	0	2	–	9	–	0
Maine	2	–	6	–	0	3	–	8	–	0
Mid-Atlantic Division
No. 13 James Madison x^	6	–	2	–	0	10	–	3	–	0
No. 19 William & Mary x	6	–	2	–	0	8	–	3	–	0
Delaware	5	–	3	–	0	7	–	3	–	1
Villanova	2	–	6	–	0	5	–	6	–	0
Northeastern	2	–	6	–	0	2	–	9	–	0
Richmond	1	–	7	–	0	3	–	8	–	0
$ – Conference champion; x – Division champion/co-champions; ^ – NCAA Division I-AA playoff participant; Rankings from The Sports Network poll

The 1994 Rhode Island Rams football team was an American football team that represented the University of Rhode Island in the Yankee Conference during the 1994 NCAA Division I-AA football season. In their second season under head coach Floyd Keith, the Rams compiled a 2–9 record (2–6 against conference opponents) and finished in a tie for last place in the New England Division of the Yankee Conference.

== Schedule ==
Date	Opponent	Site	Result	Attendance	Source
September 3	No. 21 William & Mary	Meade Stadium; Kingston, RI	L 17–38	3,383	
September 10	at Maine	Alumni Field; Orono, ME	W 28–21	4,013	
September 17	at Northeastern	Parsons Field; Brookline, MA	W 27–20	4,050	
September 24	Brown*	Meade Stadium; Kingston, RI (rivalry)	L 29–32	5,692	
October 1	at UMass	McGuirk Stadium; Hadley, MA	L 12–22	10,812	
October 8	No. 12 Boston University	Meade Stadium; Kingston, RI	L 23–45	3,714	
October 22	at Connecticut	Memorial Stadium; Storrs, CT (rivalry)	L 16–33	13,119	
October 29	No. 22 New Hampshire^{†}	Meade Stadium; Kingston, RI	L 7–13	5,239	
November 4	at No. 23 Hofstra*	Hofstra Stadium; Hempstead, NY	L 16–42	5,081	
November 12	Delaware State*	Meade Stadium; Kingston, RI	L 26–28	3,009	
November 19	at Delaware	Delaware Stadium; Newark, DE	L 7–26	11,646	
*Non-conference game; ^{†}Homecoming; Rankings from The Sports Network Poll released prior to the game
