= 1956 New Hampshire Wildcats football team =

American college football season

1956 New Hampshire Wildcats football
- Conference: Yankee Conference
- Record: 3–4–1 (2–1–1 Yankee)
- Head coach: Chief Boston (8th season)
- Home stadium: Cowell Stadium

1956 Yankee Conference football standings
	Conf.					Overall
Team	W		L		T	W		L		T
Connecticut $	3	–	0	–	1	6	–	2	–	1
Maine	3	–	1	–	0	5	–	2	–	0
New Hampshire	2	–	1	–	1	3	–	4	–	1
Vermont	1	–	2	–	0	2	–	5	–	0
UMass	1	–	3	–	0	2	–	5	–	1
Rhode Island	1	–	4	–	0	2	–	6	–	0
$ – Conference champion

The 1956 New Hampshire Wildcats football team was an American football team that represented the University of New Hampshire as a member of the Yankee Conference during the 1956 college football season. In its eighth year under head coach Chief Boston, the team compiled a 3–4–1 record (2–1–1 against conference opponents) and finished third out of six teams in the Yankee Conference.

== Schedule ==
Date	Opponent	Site	Result	Attendance	Source
September 29	at Dartmouth*	Memorial Field; Hanover, NH (rivalry)	L 0–13	9,500	
October 6	Rhode Island	Cowell Stadium; Durham, NH	W 13–7		
October 13	at Maine	Alumni Field; Orono, ME (Battle for the Brice–Cowell Musket)	L 7–29	6,600	
October 20	Delaware*	Cowell Stadium; Durham, NH	L 18–20	7,000	
October 27	at Brandeis*	Gordon Field; Waltham, MA	W 20–13	4,000	
November 3	Connecticut	Cowell Stadium; Durham, NH	T 0–0	8,000	
November 10	Springfield*	Cowell Stadium; Durham, NH	L 14–40	5,000	
November 17	at UMass	Alumni Field; Amherst, MA (rivalry)	W 28–7	4,500	
*Non-conference game
