= 1953 Vermont Catamounts football team =

American college football season

1953 Vermont Catamounts football
- Conference: Yankee Conference
- Record: 3–3–1 (0–1 Yankee)
- Head coach: J. Edward Donnelly (2nd season)
- Home stadium: Centennial Field

1953 Yankee Conference football standings
	Conf.					Overall
Team	W		L		T	W		L		T
New Hampshire +	3	–	1	–	0	6	–	2	–	0
Rhode Island +	3	–	1	–	0	6	–	2	–	0
Connecticut	2	–	1	–	1	3	–	4	–	1
Maine	1	–	2	–	1	4	–	2	–	1
Vermont	0	–	1	–	0	3	–	3	–	1
UMass	0	–	3	–	0	1	–	7	–	0
+ – Conference co-champions

The 1953 Vermont Catamounts football team was an American football team that represented the University of Vermont in the Yankee Conference during the 1953 college football season. In their second year under head coach J. Edward Donnelly, the team compiled a 3–3–1 record.

== Schedule ==
Date	Opponent	Site	Result	Attendance	Source
September 26	Dartmouth B*	Centennial Field; Burlington, VT	W 38–13	2,500	
October 3	at Maine	Alumni Field; Orono, ME	L 0–13		
October 10	Saint Michael's*	Centennial Field; Burlington, VT	T 13–13	7,000	
October 17	Rochester*	Centennial Field; Burlington, VT	W 28–7		
October 24	Norwich*	Centennial Field; Burlington, VT	W 26–13	5,500	
October 31	at Northeastern*	Kent Street Field; Brookline, MA	L 18–33	5,000	
November 7	at Middlebury*	Porter Field; Middlebury, VT	L 0–7		
*Non-conference game
