= 1954 Rhode Island Rams football team =

American college football season

1954 Rhode Island Rams football
- Conference: Yankee Conference
- Record: 6–2 (3–1 Yankee)
- Head coach: Hal Kopp (4th season)
- Home stadium: Meade Stadium

1954 Yankee Conference football standings
| | Conf. | | | | | Overall |
| Team | W | | L | | T | W | | L | | T |
|---|---|---|---|---|---|---|---|---|---|---|
| New Hampshire $ | 4 | – | 0 | – | 0 | 7 | – | 1 | – | 0 |
| Rhode Island | 3 | – | 1 | – | 0 | 6 | – | 2 | – | 0 |
| Maine | 2 | – | 2 | – | 0 | 5 | – | 2 | – | 0 |
| Vermont | 1 | – | 1 | – | 0 | 5 | – | 1 | – | 1 |
| UMass | 1 | – | 3 | – | 0 | 4 | – | 4 | – | 0 |
| Connecticut | 0 | – | 4 | – | 0 | 1 | – | 8 | – | 0 |
$ – Conference champion

The 1954 Rhode Island Rams football team was an American football team that represented the University of Rhode Island as a member of the Yankee Conference during the 1954 college football season. In its fourth season under head coach Hal Kopp, the team compiled a 6–2 record (3–1 against conference opponents), finished second out of six teams in the Yankee Conference, and outscored opponents by a total of 164 to 111. The team played its home games at Meade Stadium in Kingston, Rhode Island.

== Schedule ==
| Date | Opponent | Site | Result | Attendance | Source |
|---|---|---|---|---|---|
| September 18 | Northeastern* | Meade Stadium; Kingston, RI | W 13–7 | | |
| September 25 | at Maine | Alumni Field; Orono, ME | W 14–7 | | |
| October 2 | at New Hampshire | Cowell Stadium; Durham, NH | L 6–33 | | |
| October 9 | at Brown* | Brown Stadium; Providence, RI (rivalry) | L 0–35 | 15,000 | |
| October 16 | UMass | Meade Stadium; Kingston, RI | W 52–6 | | |
| October 23 | Hofstra* | Meade Stadium; Kingston, RI | W 46–14 | | |
| October 30 | at Springfield* | Springfield, MA | W 13–9 | | |
| November 13 | Connecticut | Meade Stadium; Kingston, RI (rivalry) | W 20–0 | | |
*Non-conference game
