= 1954 UMass Redmen football team =

American college football season

1954 UMass Redmen football
- Conference: Yankee Conference
- Record: 4–4 (1–3 Yankee)
- Head coach: Charlie O'Rourke (3rd season)
- Home stadium: Alumni Field

1954 Yankee Conference football standings
| | Conf. | | | | | Overall |
| Team | W | | L | | T | W | | L | | T |
|---|---|---|---|---|---|---|---|---|---|---|
| New Hampshire $ | 4 | – | 0 | – | 0 | 7 | – | 1 | – | 0 |
| Rhode Island | 3 | – | 1 | – | 0 | 6 | – | 2 | – | 0 |
| Maine | 2 | – | 2 | – | 0 | 5 | – | 2 | – | 0 |
| Vermont | 1 | – | 1 | – | 0 | 5 | – | 1 | – | 1 |
| UMass | 1 | – | 3 | – | 0 | 4 | – | 4 | – | 0 |
| Connecticut | 0 | – | 4 | – | 0 | 1 | – | 8 | – | 0 |
$ – Conference champion

The 1954 UMass Redmen football team represented the University of Massachusetts Amherst in the 1954 college football season as a member of the Yankee Conference. The team was coached by Charlie O'Rourke and played its home games at Alumni Field in Amherst, Massachusetts. UMass finished the season with a record of 4–4 overall and 1–3 in conference play.

== Schedule ==
| Date | Opponent | Site | Result | Attendance | Source |
|---|---|---|---|---|---|
| September 25 | American International* | Alumni Field; Amherst, MA | W 32–27 | | |
| October 2 | at Harvard* | Harvard Stadium; Boston, MA | W 13–7 | 15,800 | |
| October 9 | Connecticut | Alumni Field; Amherst, MA (rivalry) | W 20–13 | | |
| October 16 | at Rhode Island | Meade Stadium; Kingston, RI | L 6–52 | | |
| October 23 | Northeastern* | Alumni Field; Amherst, MA | L 0–39 | | |
| October 30 | at Vermont | Centennial Field; Burlington, VT | L 25–27 | 7,500 | |
| November 6 | New Hampshire | Alumni Field; Amherst, MA (rivalry) | L 12–32 | | |
| November 13 | at Tufts* | Tufts Oval; Somerville, MA | W 19–13 | | |
*Non-conference game
