= 1954 Connecticut Huskies football team =

American college football season

1954 Connecticut Huskies football
- Conference: Yankee Conference
- Record: 1–8 (0–4 Yankee)
- Head coach: Bob Ingalls (3rd season)
- Home stadium: Memorial Stadium

1954 Yankee Conference football standings
	Conf.					Overall
Team	W		L		T	W		L		T
New Hampshire $	4	–	0	–	0	7	–	1	–	0
Rhode Island	3	–	1	–	0	6	–	2	–	0
Maine	2	–	2	–	0	5	–	2	–	0
Vermont	1	–	1	–	0	5	–	1	–	1
UMass	1	–	3	–	0	4	–	4	–	0
Connecticut	0	–	4	–	0	1	–	8	–	0
$ – Conference champion

The 1954 Connecticut Huskies football team represented the University of Connecticut in the 1954 college football season. The Huskies were led by third-year head coach Bob Ingalls, and completed the season with a record of 1–8.

== Schedule ==
Date	Opponent	Site	Result	Attendance	Source
September 25	at Yale*	Yale Bowl; New Haven, CT	L 0–27	25,000	
October 2	Boston University*	Memorial Stadium; Storrs, CT	L 13–41		
October 9	at UMass	Alumni Field; Amherst, MA (rivalry)	L 13–20		
October 16	Maine^{†}	Memorial Stadium; Storrs, CT	L 13–41	11,000	
October 23	at Delaware*	Delaware Stadium; Newark, DE	L 7–28	6,919	
October 30	at New Hampshire	Cowell Stadium; Durham, NH	L 0–34		
November 6	Northeastern*	Memorial Stadium; Storrs, CT	W 20–19		
November 13	at Rhode Island	Meade Stadium; Kingston, RI (rivalry)	L 0–20		
November 20	at Holy Cross*	Fitton Field; Worcester, MA	L 26–46	5,000	
*Non-conference game; ^{†}Homecoming
