= 1950 Maine Black Bears football team =

American college football season

1950 Maine Black Bears football
- Conference: Yankee Conference, Maine Intercollegiate Athletic Association
- Record: 5–1–1 (3–1 Yankee, 2–0–1 MIAA)
- Head coach: David M. Nelson (2nd season)
- Captain: Peter Pocius Jr.
- Home stadium: Alumni Field

1950 Yankee Conference football standings
	Conf.					Overall
Team	W		L		T	W		L		T
New Hampshire $	4	–	0	–	0	8	–	0	–	0
Maine	3	–	1	–	0	5	–	1	–	1
Rhode Island State	2	–	2	–	0	3	–	5	–	0
UMass	1	–	1	–	0	3	–	5	–	0
Vermont	0	–	3	–	0	2	–	5	–	0
Connecticut	0	–	3	–	0	3	–	5	–	0
$ – Conference champion

The 1950 Maine Black Bears football team was an American football team that represented the University of Maine as a member of the Yankee Conference and Maine Intercollegiate Athletic Association during the 1950 college football season. In its second and final season under head coach David M. Nelson, the team compiled a 5–1–1 record (3–1 against Yankee Conference and 2–0–1 against MIAA opponents). The team played its home games at Alumni Field in Orono, Maine. Peter Pocius Jr. was the team captain.

The team's statistical leaders included right halfback Lawrence Hersom with 484 rushing yards; quarterback Eugene Sturgeon with 102 passing yards; and end Richard Largay with 46 receiving yards. Three players (Hersom, Philip Coulombe, and Gordon Pendleton) tied with 18 points scored.

In February 1951, coach Nelson resigned his post as Maine's head football coach to become head football coach and athletic director at the University of Delaware. Nelson was the head coach at Delaware for 15 years and was inducted into the College Football Hall of Fame in 1987.

== Schedule ==
Date	Opponent	Site	Result	Attendance	Source
September 30	at Rhode Island State	Meade Field; Kingston, RI	W 13–0		
October 7	at Vermont	Centennial Field; Burlington, VT	W 15–7		
October 14	New Hampshire	Alumni Field; Orono, ME (rivalry)	L 0–19	6,000	
October 21	at Connecticut	Gardner Dow Athletic Fields; Storrs, CT	W 16–7		
October 28	Bates	Alumni Field; Orono, ME	W 19–6		
November 4	Colby	Alumni Field; Orono, ME	W 26–7		
November 11	at Bowdoin	Whittier Field; Brunswick, ME	T 6–6		
