= 1994 Connecticut Huskies football team =

American college football season

1994 Connecticut Huskies football
- Conference: Yankee Conference
- New England Division
- Record: 4–7 (4–4 Yankee)
- Head coach: Skip Holtz (1st season)
- Home stadium: Memorial Stadium

1994 Yankee Conference football standings
	Conf.					Overall
Team	W		L		T	W		L		T
New England Division
No. 12 New Hampshire x$^	8	–	0	–	0	10	–	2	–	0
No. 9 Boston University ^	6	–	2	–	0	9	–	3	–	0
Connecticut	4	–	4	–	0	4	–	7	–	0
UMass	4	–	4	–	0	5	–	6	–	0
Rhode Island	2	–	6	–	0	2	–	9	–	0
Maine	2	–	6	–	0	3	–	8	–	0
Mid-Atlantic Division
No. 13 James Madison x^	6	–	2	–	0	10	–	3	–	0
No. 19 William & Mary x	6	–	2	–	0	8	–	3	–	0
Delaware	5	–	3	–	0	7	–	3	–	1
Villanova	2	–	6	–	0	5	–	6	–	0
Northeastern	2	–	6	–	0	2	–	9	–	0
Richmond	1	–	7	–	0	3	–	8	–	0
$ – Conference champion; x – Division champion/co-champions; ^ – NCAA Division I-AA playoff participant; Rankings from The Sports Network poll

The 1994 Connecticut Huskies football team represented the University of Connecticut in the 1994 NCAA Division I-AA football season. The Huskies were led by first-year head coach Skip Holtz, and completed the season with a record of 4–7.

== Schedule ==
Date	Opponent	Site	Result	Attendance	Source
September 3	Nicholls State*	Memorial Stadium; Storrs, CT	L 7–16	12,156	
September 10	No. 7 Troy State*	Memorial Stadium; Storrs, CT	L 21–31		
September 17	Richmond	Memorial Stadium; Storrs, CT	W 36–21	8,292	
September 24	at New Hampshire	Cowell Stadium; Durham, NH	L 19–20		
October 1	at Yale*	Yale Bowl; New Haven, CT	L 17–28	9,314	
October 8	Villanova	Memorial Stadium; Storrs, CT	W 26–10	14,371	
October 15	Maine	Memorial Stadium; Storrs, CT	L 31–35		
October 22	Rhode Island	Memorial Stadium; Storrs, CT (rivalry)	W 33–16	13,119	
November 5	at No. 7 Boston University	Nickerson Field; Boston, MA	L 9–26	7,064	
November 12	at No. 9 James Madison	Bridgeforth Stadium; Harrisonburg, VA	L 20–48	11,000	
November 19	at UMass	Warren McGuirk Alumni Stadium; Amherst, MA (rivalry)	W 21–13	7,296	
*Non-conference game; Rankings from The Sports Network Poll released prior to the game
