= 1961 Western Maryland Green Terror football team =

American college football season

1961 Western Maryland Green Terror football

Mason–Dixon champion
- Conference: Mason–Dixon Conference, Middle Atlantic Conference
- Southern College Division
- Record: 7–2 (4–0 Mason–Dixon, 4–2 MAC)
- Head coach: Bob Waldorf (5th season)
- Home stadium: Hoffa Field

1961 Mason–Dixon Conference football standings
| | Conf. | | | | | Overall |
| Team | W | | L | | T | W | | L | | T |
|---|---|---|---|---|---|---|---|---|---|---|
| Western Maryland $ | 4 | – | 0 | – | 0 | 7 | – | 2 | – | 0 |
| Gallaudet * | 1 | – | 0 | – | 0 | 1 | – | 6 | – | 0 |
| Johns Hopkins | 1 | – | 1 | – | 0 | 3 | – | 4 | – | 1 |
| Hampden–Sydney | 2 | – | 2 | – | 0 | 3 | – | 6 | – | 0 |
| Randolph–Macon | 1 | – | 2 | – | 0 | 4 | – | 5 | – | 0 |
| Bridgewater | 0 | – | 4 | – | 0 | 0 | – | 8 | – | 0 |
$ – Conference champion; * – Ineligible for title

1961 Middle Atlantic Conference football standings
| | Conf. | | | | | Overall |
| Team | W | | L | | T | W | | L | | T |
|---|---|---|---|---|---|---|---|---|---|---|
University Division
| No. 15 Rutgers x | 4 | – | 0 | – | 0 | 9 | – | 0 | – | 0 |
| Bucknell | 5 | – | 2 | – | 0 | 6 | – | 3 | – | 0 |
| Delaware | 3 | – | 2 | – | 0 | 4 | – | 4 | – | 0 |
| No. 6 Lehigh | 3 | – | 2 | – | 0 | 7 | – | 2 | – | 0 |
| Gettysburg | 2 | – | 2 | – | 1 | 3 | – | 5 | – | 1 |
| Temple | 1 | – | 2 | – | 2 | 2 | – | 5 | – | 2 |
| Lafayette | 1 | – | 5 | – | 1 | 2 | – | 6 | – | 1 |
| Muhlenberg | 0 | – | 4 | – | 0 | 2 | – | 7 | – | 0 |
Northern College Division
| Susquehanna x | 6 | – | 0 | – | 0 | 8 | – | 0 | – | 1 |
| Albright | 4 | – | 0 | – | 1 | 7 | – | 0 | – | 1 |
| Moravian | 4 | – | 1 | – | 1 | 4 | – | 3 | – | 1 |
| Wagner | 4 | – | 2 | – | 0 | 6 | – | 3 | – | 0 |
| Lycoming | 1 | – | 3 | – | 1 | 1 | – | 6 | – | 1 |
| Wilkes | 1 | – | 6 | – | 0 | 1 | – | 6 | – | 0 |
| Hofstra * | 2 | – | 0 | – | 0 | 7 | – | 2 | – | 0 |
| Juniata * | 1 | – | 2 | – | 0 | 3 | – | 4 | – | 0 |
| Upsala * | 0 | – | 4 | – | 0 | 0 | – | 7 | – | 0 |
Southern College Division
| Lebanon Valley x | 5 | – | 1 | – | 0 | 6 | – | 1 | – | 0 |
| Swarthmore | 4 | – | 2 | – | 0 | 5 | – | 2 | – | 0 |
| Western Maryland | 4 | – | 2 | – | 0 | 7 | – | 2 | – | 0 |
| Dickinson | 5 | – | 3 | – | 0 | 5 | – | 3 | – | 0 |
| Pennsylvania Military | 5 | – | 3 | – | 0 | 6 | – | 3 | – | 0 |
| Johns Hopkins | 2 | – | 3 | – | 1 | 3 | – | 4 | – | 1 |
| Ursinus | 2 | – | 5 | – | 0 | 2 | – | 5 | – | 0 |
| Drexel | 1 | – | 5 | – | 1 | 2 | – | 5 | – | 1 |
| Haverford | 0 | – | 6 | – | 1 | 0 | – | 6 | – | 1 |
| West Chester * | 0 | – | 0 | – | 0 | 7 | – | 2 | – | 0 |
| Franklin & Marshall * | 0 | – | 3 | – | 0 | 1 | – | 7 | – | 0 |
x – Division champion/co-champions; * – Ineligible for championship due to insufficient conference games; Rankings from major college AP poll for Rutgers and small college AP poll for Lehigh

The 1951 Western Maryland Green Terror football team was an American football team that represented Western Maryland College (now known as McDaniel College) as a member of the Mason–Dixon Conference and the Middle Atlantic Conference (MAC) during the 1961 college football season. In their fifth season under head coach Bob Waldorf, the Green Terror compiled a 7–2 record (4–0 in Mason-Dixon games, 4–2 in MAC games), won the Mason-Dixon championship, and tied for second place in the MAC Southern College Division. They outscored opponents by a total of 171 to 90.

The team tallied 2,164 yards of total offense (240.44 yards per game), consisting of 1,694 rushing yards and 470 passing yards. On defense, the Green Terror gave up 1,971 yards (219.0 yards per game).

Tackle Jim Pusey, 6 feet and 215 pounds, was selected as the most valuable player in the MAC's Southern College Division. He was credited as the "nucleus" of the team's forward wall.

The team's statistical leaders included quarterback Roy Terry with 268 passing yards, 524 yards of total offense, and 912 punting yards (34.0 yards per punt). Fullback Don Hobart led the team with 291 rushing yards, and fullback Charles Brown led the team with 106 receiving yards and 26 points scored (four touchdowns and a two-point conversion).

The team played its home games at Hoffa Field on Westminster, Maryland.

== Schedule ==
| Date | Opponent | Site | Result | Attendance | Source |
|---|---|---|---|---|---|
| September 23 | at Bridgewater | Bridgewater, VA | W 38–0 | | |
| September 30 | Pennsylvania Military | Hoffa Field; Westminster, MD | L 8–18 | | |
| October 7 | Randolph–Macon | Hoffa Field; Westminster, MD | W 28–6 | | |
| October 14 | at Hampden–Sydney | Hampden Sydney, VA | W 8–0 | | |
| October 21 | at Susquehanna | University Field; Selinsgrove, PA | L 8–34 | 3,000 | |
| October 28 | Upsala^{†} | Hoffa Field; Westminster, MD | W 26–18 | | |
| November 4 | at Lycoming | Williamsport, PA | W 7–6 | | |
| November 11 | Drexel | Hoffa Field; Westminster, MD | W 18–0 | 2,500–3,000 | |
| November 18 | at Johns Hopkins | Baltimore, MD | W 30–8 | | ' |
^{†}Homecoming
