= 1961 Bucknell Bison football team =

American college football season

1961 Bucknell Bison football
- Conference: Middle Atlantic Conference
- University Division
- Record: 6–3 (5–2 MAC)
- Head coach: Bob Odell (3rd season)
- Captain: Kirk Foulke
- Home stadium: Memorial Stadium

1961 Middle Atlantic Conference football standings
	Conf.					Overall
Team	W		L		T	W		L		T
University Division
No. 15 Rutgers x	4	–	0	–	0	9	–	0	–	0
Bucknell	5	–	2	–	0	6	–	3	–	0
Delaware	3	–	2	–	0	4	–	4	–	0
No. 6 Lehigh	3	–	2	–	0	7	–	2	–	0
Gettysburg	2	–	2	–	1	3	–	5	–	1
Temple	1	–	2	–	2	2	–	5	–	2
Lafayette	1	–	5	–	1	2	–	6	–	1
Muhlenberg	0	–	4	–	0	2	–	7	–	0
Northern College Division
Susquehanna x	6	–	0	–	0	8	–	0	–	1
Albright	4	–	0	–	1	7	–	0	–	1
Moravian	4	–	1	–	1	4	–	3	–	1
Wagner	4	–	2	–	0	6	–	3	–	0
Lycoming	1	–	3	–	1	1	–	6	–	1
Wilkes	1	–	6	–	0	1	–	6	–	0
Hofstra *	2	–	0	–	0	7	–	2	–	0
Juniata *	1	–	2	–	0	3	–	4	–	0
Upsala *	0	–	4	–	0	0	–	7	–	0
Southern College Division
Lebanon Valley x	5	–	1	–	0	6	–	1	–	0
Swarthmore	4	–	2	–	0	5	–	2	–	0
Western Maryland	4	–	2	–	0	7	–	2	–	0
Dickinson	5	–	3	–	0	5	–	3	–	0
Pennsylvania Military	5	–	3	–	0	6	–	3	–	0
Johns Hopkins	2	–	3	–	1	3	–	4	–	1
Ursinus	2	–	5	–	0	2	–	5	–	0
Drexel	1	–	5	–	1	2	–	5	–	1
Haverford	0	–	6	–	1	0	–	6	–	1
West Chester *	0	–	0	–	0	7	–	2	–	0
Franklin & Marshall *	0	–	3	–	0	1	–	7	–	0
x – Division champion/co-champions; * – Ineligible for championship due to insufficient conference games; Rankings from major college AP poll for Rutgers and small college AP poll for Lehigh

The 1961 Bucknell Bison football team was an American football team that represented Bucknell University during the 1961 college football season. Bucknell ranked second in the University Division of the Middle Atlantic Conference.

In its third season under head coach Bob Odell, the team compiled a 6–3 record, and a 5–2 record against division opponents. Kirk Foulke was the team captain.

The team played its home games at Memorial Stadium on the university campus in Lewisburg, Pennsylvania.

== Schedule ==
Date	Opponent	Site	Result	Attendance	Source
September 23	vs. Gettysburg	Hershey Stadium; Hershey, PA (Rotary Bowl)	W 12–6	9,500	
September 30	at Temple	Temple Stadium; Philadelphia, PA	W 8–7	9,500	
October 7	at Colgate*	Colgate Athletic Field; Hamilton, NY	L 0–13	5,200	
October 14	Rutgers^{†}	Memorial Stadium; Lewisburg, PA	L 6–21	8,000	
October 21	at Lafayette	Fisher Field; Easton, PA	W 13–0	5,000	
October 28	Muhlenberg	Memorial Stadium; Lewisburg, PA	W 27–0	7,000	
November 4	at Buffalo*	Rotary Field; Buffalo, NY	W 12–6	8,100–8,126	
November 11	at Lehigh	Taylor Stadium; Bethlehem, PA	L 7–12	11,000	
November 18	Delaware	Memorial Stadium; Lewisburg, PA	W 22–14	6,000	
*Non-conference game; ^{†}Homecoming
