= 1961 Wagner Seahawks football team =

American college football season

1961 Wagner Seahawks football
- Conference: Middle Atlantic Conference
- Northern College Division
- Record: 6–3 (4–2 MAC)
- Head coach: Mickey Sullivan (5th season)
- Home stadium: Grymes Hill Stadium

1961 Middle Atlantic Conference football standings
	Conf.					Overall
Team	W		L		T	W		L		T
University Division
No. 15 Rutgers x	4	–	0	–	0	9	–	0	–	0
Bucknell	5	–	2	–	0	6	–	3	–	0
Delaware	3	–	2	–	0	4	–	4	–	0
No. 6 Lehigh	3	–	2	–	0	7	–	2	–	0
Gettysburg	2	–	2	–	1	3	–	5	–	1
Temple	1	–	2	–	2	2	–	5	–	2
Lafayette	1	–	5	–	1	2	–	6	–	1
Muhlenberg	0	–	4	–	0	2	–	7	–	0
Northern College Division
Susquehanna x	6	–	0	–	0	8	–	0	–	1
Albright	4	–	0	–	1	7	–	0	–	1
Moravian	4	–	1	–	1	4	–	3	–	1
Wagner	4	–	2	–	0	6	–	3	–	0
Lycoming	1	–	3	–	1	1	–	6	–	1
Wilkes	1	–	6	–	0	1	–	6	–	0
Hofstra *	2	–	0	–	0	7	–	2	–	0
Juniata *	1	–	2	–	0	3	–	4	–	0
Upsala *	0	–	4	–	0	0	–	7	–	0
Southern College Division
Lebanon Valley x	5	–	1	–	0	6	–	1	–	0
Swarthmore	4	–	2	–	0	5	–	2	–	0
Western Maryland	4	–	2	–	0	7	–	2	–	0
Dickinson	5	–	3	–	0	5	–	3	–	0
Pennsylvania Military	5	–	3	–	0	6	–	3	–	0
Johns Hopkins	2	–	3	–	1	3	–	4	–	1
Ursinus	2	–	5	–	0	2	–	5	–	0
Drexel	1	–	5	–	1	2	–	5	–	1
Haverford	0	–	6	–	1	0	–	6	–	1
West Chester *	0	–	0	–	0	7	–	2	–	0
Franklin & Marshall *	0	–	3	–	0	1	–	7	–	0
x – Division champion/co-champions; * – Ineligible for championship due to insufficient conference games; Rankings from major college AP poll for Rutgers and small college AP poll for Lehigh

The 1961 Wagner Seahawks football team was an American football team that represented Wagner College as a member of the Middle Atlantic Conference (MAC) during the 1961 college football season. In their fifth and final year under head coach Mickey Sullivan, the Seahawks compiled a 6–3 record (4–3 in conference games) and finished in fourth place in the MAC Northern College Division.

The team tallied 2,370 yards of total offense (263.3 yards per game), consisting of 1,009 rushing yards (112.1 yards per game) and 1,361 passing yards (151.2 yards per game). On defense, the team held opponents to 2,174 yards of total offense (241.6 yards per game) with 1,207 rushing yards (134.1 yards per game) and 967 passing yards (107.4 yards per game).

Quarterback Don Cavalli totaled 1,331 passing yards and 1,354 yards of total offense. For the second consecutive year, Cavalli led the MAC Northern College Division in both passing and total offense. He also ranked seventh among the NCAA's small college players.

Halfback Frank Melos led the team in rushing with 449 yards and scoring with 96 points on 14 touchdowns and six two-point conversions. Melos's 96 points ranked fifth among the NCAA's small college players. End Bruce Wilson was the team's leading receiver with 30 catches for 607 yards and nine touchdowns.

== Schedule ==
Date	Opponent	Site	Result	Attendance	Source
September 23	at Pennsylvania Military	Chester, PA	L 0–14		
September 30	Haverford	Staten Island, NY	W 34–6	3,500	
October 7	at Merchant Marine	Tomb Memorial Field; Kings Point, NY	L 16–19	4,500	
October 14	Susquehanna	Staten Island, NY	L 24–28	2,500	
October 21	at Dickinson	Biddle Field; Carlisle, PA	W 18–13		
October 28	Ursinus	Staten Island NY	W 20–12	3,400	
November 4	Trenton State*	Staten Island NY	W 34–0	3,200	
November 11	at Hamilton*	Clinton, NY	W 48–20	1,900	
November 18	at Upsala	Viking Field; East Orange, NJ	W 21–0		
*Non-conference game
