= 1961 Temple Owls football team =

American college football season

1961 Temple Owls football
- Conference: Middle Atlantic Conference
- University Division
- Record: 2–5–2 (1–2–2 MAC)
- Head coach: George Makris (2nd season)
- Captain: Game captains
- Home stadium: Temple Stadium

1961 Middle Atlantic Conference football standings
	Conf.					Overall
Team	W		L		T	W		L		T
University Division
No. 15 Rutgers x	4	–	0	–	0	9	–	0	–	0
Bucknell	5	–	2	–	0	6	–	3	–	0
Delaware	3	–	2	–	0	4	–	4	–	0
No. 6 Lehigh	3	–	2	–	0	7	–	2	–	0
Gettysburg	2	–	2	–	1	3	–	5	–	1
Temple	1	–	2	–	2	2	–	5	–	2
Lafayette	1	–	5	–	1	2	–	6	–	1
Muhlenberg	0	–	4	–	0	2	–	7	–	0
Northern College Division
Susquehanna x	6	–	0	–	0	8	–	0	–	1
Albright	4	–	0	–	1	7	–	0	–	1
Moravian	4	–	1	–	1	4	–	3	–	1
Wagner	4	–	2	–	0	6	–	3	–	0
Lycoming	1	–	3	–	1	1	–	6	–	1
Wilkes	1	–	6	–	0	1	–	6	–	0
Hofstra *	2	–	0	–	0	7	–	2	–	0
Juniata *	1	–	2	–	0	3	–	4	–	0
Upsala *	0	–	4	–	0	0	–	7	–	0
Southern College Division
Lebanon Valley x	5	–	1	–	0	6	–	1	–	0
Swarthmore	4	–	2	–	0	5	–	2	–	0
Western Maryland	4	–	2	–	0	7	–	2	–	0
Dickinson	5	–	3	–	0	5	–	3	–	0
Pennsylvania Military	5	–	3	–	0	6	–	3	–	0
Johns Hopkins	2	–	3	–	1	3	–	4	–	1
Ursinus	2	–	5	–	0	2	–	5	–	0
Drexel	1	–	5	–	1	2	–	5	–	1
Haverford	0	–	6	–	1	0	–	6	–	1
West Chester *	0	–	0	–	0	7	–	2	–	0
Franklin & Marshall *	0	–	3	–	0	1	–	7	–	0
x – Division champion/co-champions; * – Ineligible for championship due to insufficient conference games; Rankings from major college AP poll for Rutgers and small college AP poll for Lehigh

The 1961 Temple Owls football team was an American football team that represented Temple University as a member of the Middle Atlantic Conference (MAC) during the 1961 college football season. In its second season under head coach George Makris, the team compiled a 2–5–2 record (1–2–2 against MAC opponents) and finished seventh out of eight teams in the MAC's University Division. The team played its home games at Temple Stadium in Philadelphia.

== Schedule ==
Date	Opponent	Site	Result	Attendance	Source
September 23	at Merchant Marine*	Temple Stadium; Philadelphia, PA	L 0–12	3,500–5,000	
September 30	Bucknell	Temple Stadium; Philadelphia, PA	L 7–8	9,500	
October 7	Muhlenberg	Temple Stadium; Philadelphia, PA	W 36–12	7,500	
October 14	Lafayette	Temple Stadium; Philadelphia, PA	T 12–12	3,000	
October 21	at Buffalo*	Rotary Field; Buffalo, NY	L 3–30	6,921–7,500	
October 28	Hofstra*	Temple Stadium; Philadelphia, PA	W 14–12	6,500	
November 4	at Delaware	Delaware Stadium; Newark, DE	L 0–28	6,200	
November 11	at Gettysburg	Memorial Field; Gettysburg, PA	T 0–0	4,200	
November 18	Toledo*	Temple Stadium; Philadelphia, PA	L 14–15	5,000	
*Non-conference game
