= 1961 Drexel Dragons football team =

American college football season

1961 Drexel Dragons football
- Conference: Middle Atlantic Conference
- Southern College Division
- Record: 2–5–1 (1–5–1 MAC)
- Head coach: Tom Grebis (1st season)
- Home stadium: Drexel Field

1961 Middle Atlantic Conference football standings
	Conf.					Overall
Team	W		L		T	W		L		T
University Division
No. 15 Rutgers x	4	–	0	–	0	9	–	0	–	0
Bucknell	5	–	2	–	0	6	–	3	–	0
Delaware	3	–	2	–	0	4	–	4	–	0
No. 6 Lehigh	3	–	2	–	0	7	–	2	–	0
Gettysburg	2	–	2	–	1	3	–	5	–	1
Temple	1	–	2	–	2	2	–	5	–	2
Lafayette	1	–	5	–	1	2	–	6	–	1
Muhlenberg	0	–	4	–	0	2	–	7	–	0
Northern College Division
Susquehanna x	6	–	0	–	0	8	–	0	–	1
Albright	4	–	0	–	1	7	–	0	–	1
Moravian	4	–	1	–	1	4	–	3	–	1
Wagner	4	–	2	–	0	6	–	3	–	0
Lycoming	1	–	3	–	1	1	–	6	–	1
Wilkes	1	–	6	–	0	1	–	6	–	0
Hofstra *	2	–	0	–	0	7	–	2	–	0
Juniata *	1	–	2	–	0	3	–	4	–	0
Upsala *	0	–	4	–	0	0	–	7	–	0
Southern College Division
Lebanon Valley x	5	–	1	–	0	6	–	1	–	0
Swarthmore	4	–	2	–	0	5	–	2	–	0
Western Maryland	4	–	2	–	0	7	–	2	–	0
Dickinson	5	–	3	–	0	5	–	3	–	0
Pennsylvania Military	5	–	3	–	0	6	–	3	–	0
Johns Hopkins	2	–	3	–	1	3	–	4	–	1
Ursinus	2	–	5	–	0	2	–	5	–	0
Drexel	1	–	5	–	1	2	–	5	–	1
Haverford	0	–	6	–	1	0	–	6	–	1
West Chester *	0	–	0	–	0	7	–	2	–	0
Franklin & Marshall *	0	–	3	–	0	1	–	7	–	0
x – Division champion/co-champions; * – Ineligible for championship due to insufficient conference games; Rankings from major college AP poll for Rutgers and small college AP poll for Lehigh

The 1961 Drexel Dragons football team represented the Drexel Institute of Technology (renamed Drexel University in 1970) as a member of the Middle Atlantic Conference during the 1961 college football season. Tom Grebis was the team's head coach.

== Schedule ==
Date	Time	Opponent	Site	Result	Attendance	Source
September 30		Lebanon Valley	Drexel Field; Philadelphia, PA	L 6–17	2,500–3,000	
October 7	8:00 pm	at Albright	Albright Stadium; Reading, PA	L 6–47	4,500–5,000	
October 14		Lycoming	Drexel Field; Philadelphia, PA	T 6–6	2,500	
October 21		at Pennsylvania Military	Chester, PA	W 9–2	1,500	
October 28		Juniata	Drexel Field; Philadelphia, PA	L 7–17	5,000	
November 4		Howard*	Drexel Field; Philadelphia, PA	W 13–9	2,000	
November 11		at Western Maryland	Hoffa Field; Westminster, MD	L 0–18	2,500–3,000	
November 18		at Dickinson	Carlisle, PA	L 8–27	2,000	
*Non-conference game; All times are in Eastern time

== Roster ==
1961 Drexel Dragons football team roster
Players
Coaches
Offense

Pos.	#	Name	Class
TE		Frank Gallo
HB		Joe Buffalo	Jr
HB		Al Wagner	Jr
QB		Tony DiGiovacchino
QB		George Carter

Defense

Pos.	#	Name	Class

Special teams

Pos.	#	Name	Class

Head coach

- Tom Grebis (Drexel)

Coordinators/assistant coaches

- Don Shank (Penn State)

Legend

- (C) Team captain
- (S) Suspended
- (I) Ineligible
- Injured
- Redshirt
