= 1961 Susquehanna Crusaders football team =

American college football season

1961 Susquehanna Crusaders football

MAC Northern College Division champion
- Conference: Middle Atlantic Conference
- Northern College Division
- Record: 8–0–1 (6–0 MAC)
- Head coach: Jim Garrett (2nd season)
- Captain: Ben DiFrancesco
- Home stadium: University Field

1961 Middle Atlantic Conference football standings
	Conf.					Overall
Team	W		L		T	W		L		T
University Division
No. 15 Rutgers x	4	–	0	–	0	9	–	0	–	0
Bucknell	5	–	2	–	0	6	–	3	–	0
Delaware	3	–	2	–	0	4	–	4	–	0
No. 6 Lehigh	3	–	2	–	0	7	–	2	–	0
Gettysburg	2	–	2	–	1	3	–	5	–	1
Temple	1	–	2	–	2	2	–	5	–	2
Lafayette	1	–	5	–	1	2	–	6	–	1
Muhlenberg	0	–	4	–	0	2	–	7	–	0
Northern College Division
Susquehanna x	6	–	0	–	0	8	–	0	–	1
Albright	4	–	0	–	1	7	–	0	–	1
Moravian	4	–	1	–	1	4	–	3	–	1
Wagner	4	–	2	–	0	6	–	3	–	0
Lycoming	1	–	3	–	1	1	–	6	–	1
Wilkes	1	–	6	–	0	1	–	6	–	0
Hofstra *	2	–	0	–	0	7	–	2	–	0
Juniata *	1	–	2	–	0	3	–	4	–	0
Upsala *	0	–	4	–	0	0	–	7	–	0
Southern College Division
Lebanon Valley x	5	–	1	–	0	6	–	1	–	0
Swarthmore	4	–	2	–	0	5	–	2	–	0
Western Maryland	4	–	2	–	0	7	–	2	–	0
Dickinson	5	–	3	–	0	5	–	3	–	0
Pennsylvania Military	5	–	3	–	0	6	–	3	–	0
Johns Hopkins	2	–	3	–	1	3	–	4	–	1
Ursinus	2	–	5	–	0	2	–	5	–	0
Drexel	1	–	5	–	1	2	–	5	–	1
Haverford	0	–	6	–	1	0	–	6	–	1
West Chester *	0	–	0	–	0	7	–	2	–	0
Franklin & Marshall *	0	–	3	–	0	1	–	7	–	0
x – Division champion/co-champions; * – Ineligible for championship due to insufficient conference games; Rankings from major college AP poll for Rutgers and small college AP poll for Lehigh

The 1961 Susquehanna Crusaders football team was an American football team that represented Susquehanna University as a member of the Middle Atlantic Conference (MAC) during the 1961 college football season. In their second season under head coach Jim Garrett, the Crusaders compiled an 8–0–1 record (6–0 in conference games), won the MAC Northern College Division championship, and outscored opponents by a total of 224 to 71. The season was part of a 22-game unbeaten streak that began on October 22, 1960, and ended on September 21, 1963.

Two Susquehanna players received first-team honors on the 1961 MAC Southern College Division all-star team. The honorees were senior guard and team captain Ben DiFrancesco and sophomore fullback Larry Kerstetter. Di Francesco was also selected by the Associated Press as a second-team player on the 1961 All-Pennsylvania football team.

== Schedule ==
Date	Opponent	Site	Result	Attendance	Source
September 23	vs. Lycoming	Sunbury HS field; Sunbury, PA	W 7–0		
September 30	at Ursinus	Collegeville, PA	W 28–6		
October 7	Swarthmore	University Field; Selinsgrove, PA	W 34–12	4,000	
October 14	at Wagner	Staten Island, NY	W 28–24	2,500	
October 21	Western Maryland^{†}	University Field; Selinsgrove, PA	W 34–8	3,000	
October 28	at Delaware Valley*	Alumni Field; Doylestown, PA	W 30–0	2,200	
November 4	Oberlin*	University Field; Selinsgrove, PA	T 7–7	3,000	
November 11	Hobart*	University Field; Selinsgrove, PA	W 35–6		
November 18	Wilkes	Selingrove HS Field; Selinsgrove, PA	W 21–8		
*Non-conference game; ^{†}Homecoming

== Statistics ==
Susquehanna tallied 2,781 yards of total offense (309 yards per game), consisting of 2,376 rushing yards (264 yards per game) and 405 passing yards (45 yards per game). On defense, the team gave up 1,363 yards by opponents (151.4 yards per game) with 726 rushing yards (80.7 yards per game) and 637 passing yards (70.8 yards per game).

The team's individual statistical leaders included fullback Larry Kerstetter with 610 rushing yards and 62 points scored (nine touchdowns and four catches for two-point conversions); quarterback Don Green with 915 yards of total offense and 395 passing yards; end Ken Hauser with 11 receptions for 135 yards.
