= 1961 Rutgers Scarlet Knights football team =

American college football season

1961 Rutgers Scarlet Knights football
- Captain Alex Kroll and head coach John F. Bateman

MAC University Division champion
- Conference: Middle Atlantic Conference
- University Division

Ranking
- AP: No. 15
- Record: 9–0 (4–0 MAC)
- Head coach: John F. Bateman (2nd season)
- MVP: Sam Mudie
- Captain: Alex Kroll
- Home stadium: Rutgers Stadium

1961 Middle Atlantic Conference football standings
	Conf.					Overall
Team	W		L		T	W		L		T
University Division
No. 15 Rutgers x	4	–	0	–	0	9	–	0	–	0
Bucknell	5	–	2	–	0	6	–	3	–	0
Delaware	3	–	2	–	0	4	–	4	–	0
No. 6 Lehigh	3	–	2	–	0	7	–	2	–	0
Gettysburg	2	–	2	–	1	3	–	5	–	1
Temple	1	–	2	–	2	2	–	5	–	2
Lafayette	1	–	5	–	1	2	–	6	–	1
Muhlenberg	0	–	4	–	0	2	–	7	–	0
Northern College Division
Susquehanna x	6	–	0	–	0	8	–	0	–	1
Albright	4	–	0	–	1	7	–	0	–	1
Moravian	4	–	1	–	1	4	–	3	–	1
Wagner	4	–	2	–	0	6	–	3	–	0
Lycoming	1	–	3	–	1	1	–	6	–	1
Wilkes	1	–	6	–	0	1	–	6	–	0
Hofstra *	2	–	0	–	0	7	–	2	–	0
Juniata *	1	–	2	–	0	3	–	4	–	0
Upsala *	0	–	4	–	0	0	–	7	–	0
Southern College Division
Lebanon Valley x	5	–	1	–	0	6	–	1	–	0
Swarthmore	4	–	2	–	0	5	–	2	–	0
Western Maryland	4	–	2	–	0	7	–	2	–	0
Dickinson	5	–	3	–	0	5	–	3	–	0
Pennsylvania Military	5	–	3	–	0	6	–	3	–	0
Johns Hopkins	2	–	3	–	1	3	–	4	–	1
Ursinus	2	–	5	–	0	2	–	5	–	0
Drexel	1	–	5	–	1	2	–	5	–	1
Haverford	0	–	6	–	1	0	–	6	–	1
West Chester *	0	–	0	–	0	7	–	2	–	0
Franklin & Marshall *	0	–	3	–	0	1	–	7	–	0
x – Division champion/co-champions; * – Ineligible for championship due to insufficient conference games; Rankings from major college AP poll for Rutgers and small college AP poll for Lehigh

The 1961 Rutgers Scarlet Knights football team was an American football team that represented Rutgers University as a member of the Middle Atlantic Conference (MAC) during the 1961 college football season. In their second season under head coach John F. Bateman, the Scarlet Knights compiled a perfect 9–0 record (4–0 in conference games), won the MAC University Division championship, and outscored opponents by a total of 246 to 102. It was Rutgers' first undefeated season, 92 years after winning the first ever intercollegiate football game in 1869. The team ranked fifteenth in the final Associated Press writers poll.

Rutgers was one of two major teams to compile a perfect season in 1961, Alabama being the other. The Scarlet Knights were considered a contender for the 1962 Rose Bowl, but Rutgers officials stated that it was the university's policy to turn down any and all bowl bids.

Center and team captain Alex Kroll was a consensus first-team All-American and was later inducted into the College Football Hall of Fame.

Sam Mudie played quarterback on offense and safety on defense and was selected as the team's most valuable player. He led the team with 703 yards of total offense (402 rushing, 300 passing), 60 points scored, and six interceptions with 167 return yards.

The team played its home games at Rutgers Stadium in Piscataway, New Jersey.

== Schedule ==
Date	Opponent	Site	Result	Attendance	Source
September 30	at Princeton*	Palmer Stadium; Princeton, NJ (rivalry)	W 16–13	41,000	
October 7	Connecticut*	Rutgers Stadium; Piscataway, NJ	W 35–12	11,000	
October 14	at Bucknell	Memorial Stadium; Lewisburg, PA	W 21–6	8,000	
October 21	Lehigh^{†}	Rutgers Stadium; Piscataway, NJ	W 32–15	17,000	
October 28	at Penn*	Franklin Field; Philadelphia, PA	W 20–6	14,996	
November 4	at Lafayette	Fisher Field; Easton, PA	W 37–6	6,500	
November 11	Delaware	Rutgers Stadium; Piscataway, NJ	W 27–19	22,000	
November 18	at Colgate*	Colgate Athletic Field; Hamilton, NY	W 26–6	8,500	
November 25	Columbia*	Rutgers Stadium; Piscataway, NJ	W 32–19	25,000	
*Non-conference game; ^{†}Homecoming

== Awards ==
Alex Kroll, who played at center on offense and linebacker on defense, was a consensus first-team pick at center on the 1961 All-America team. He received first-team honors from the American Football Coaches Association, Associated Press, Football Writers Association of America, Newspaper Enterprise Association, and United Press International. With Kroll's strength in the middle of the line, Rutgers used the quarterback sneak as an offensive weapon, scoring seven touchdowns on the play. He was later inducted into the College Football Hall of Fame.

Kroll and fullback Steve Simms received first-team honors on the 1961 All-Eastern football team.

Quarterback Sam Mudie won the Homer Hazel Award as the team's most valuable player.

== Statistics ==
Rutgers tallied 2,612 yards of total offense, consisting of 1,968 rushing yards (218.7 yards per game) and 644 passing yards (71.6 yards per game). On defense, the team held opponents to 2,114 yards with 1,230 rushing yards (136.7 yards per game) and 884 passing yards (98.2 yards per game). Rutgers also intercepted 23 passes which they returned for 405 yards.

The team's passing leaders were Bill Speranza (15 of 46 for 318 yards with three touchdowns and six interceptions) and Sam Mudie (23 of 64 for 300 yards with four touchdowns and six interceptions).

The team's rushing leaders were Steve Simms (614 yards, 130 carries, 4.7 yard average), Sam Mudie (403 yards, 80 carries), Bill Thompson (372 yards, 67 carries), and Pierce Frauenheim (190 yards, 46 carries).

The receiving leaders were Lee Curley (12 catches, 274 yards), Pierce Frauenheim (six catches, 108 yards), and Bob Flower (five catches, 77 yards).

The scoring leaders were Sam Mudie (60 points), Pierce Frauenheim (32 points), Bill Speranza (30 points), Pierce Frauenheim (30 points), Steve Simms (30 points), Bill Thompson (18 points), and Lee Curley (18 points).

Mudie also led the team in total offense (703 yards on 144 plays).

Rutgers led the country with 23 interceptions. They tallied 405 return yards on the 23 interceptions. Mudie led the team with six interceptions and 167 return yards. He tallied three interceptions returned for 117 yards in Rutgers' victory over Colgate. Pierce Frauenheim added four interceptions for 50 yards, while Bob Yaksic and Keith Krayer had three each.

== Players ==
- Addison Bradley, guard
- Bill Craft, end
- Lee Curley, end
- Romeo Dixon, halfback
- George Elias, tackle
- Marv Engle, end
- Pierce Frauenheim, halfback and safety
- Gus Giebelhaus, tackle
- Bob Harrison, guard
- Bradley Harrison, guard
- Hoeflinger, guard
- Tom Kocaj, guard
- Joe Kowalski, fullback and corner linebacker
- Alex Kroll, center and captain
- Dick Lawrence, end
- Sam Mudie, quarterback and safety
- Jon Paulson, center
- Steve Simms, fullback
- Tony Simonelli, tackle
- Bill Speranza, quarterback
- Tom Tappen, tackle
- Bill Thompson, halfback
- Dick Webb, halfback
- Bob Yaksick, halfback and corner linebacker

== Helmet stickers ==
Michael Pellowski, in his book Rutgers Football: A Gridiron Tradition in Scarlet, credits Rutgers defensive backs coach Dewey King with being "one of the first" to award helmet stickers in 1961. The stickers were given for interceptions only. Every time there was an interception, the crowd yelled "give him the star." The stars can be seen in a photo of the 1961 Rutgers team walking from the locker room to the field prior to the season finale against Columbia.
