= 1961 Swarthmore Garnet Tide football team =

American college football season

1961 Swarthmore Garnet Tide football
- Conference: Middle Atlantic Conference
- Southern College Division
- Record: 5–2 (4–2 MAC)
- Head coach: Lew Elverson (20th season)

1961 Middle Atlantic Conference football standings
	Conf.					Overall
Team	W		L		T	W		L		T
University Division
No. 15 Rutgers x	4	–	0	–	0	9	–	0	–	0
Bucknell	5	–	2	–	0	6	–	3	–	0
Delaware	3	–	2	–	0	4	–	4	–	0
No. 6 Lehigh	3	–	2	–	0	7	–	2	–	0
Gettysburg	2	–	2	–	1	3	–	5	–	1
Temple	1	–	2	–	2	2	–	5	–	2
Lafayette	1	–	5	–	1	2	–	6	–	1
Muhlenberg	0	–	4	–	0	2	–	7	–	0
Northern College Division
Susquehanna x	6	–	0	–	0	8	–	0	–	1
Albright	4	–	0	–	1	7	–	0	–	1
Moravian	4	–	1	–	1	4	–	3	–	1
Wagner	4	–	2	–	0	6	–	3	–	0
Lycoming	1	–	3	–	1	1	–	6	–	1
Wilkes	1	–	6	–	0	1	–	6	–	0
Hofstra *	2	–	0	–	0	7	–	2	–	0
Juniata *	1	–	2	–	0	3	–	4	–	0
Upsala *	0	–	4	–	0	0	–	7	–	0
Southern College Division
Lebanon Valley x	5	–	1	–	0	6	–	1	–	0
Swarthmore	4	–	2	–	0	5	–	2	–	0
Western Maryland	4	–	2	–	0	7	–	2	–	0
Dickinson	5	–	3	–	0	5	–	3	–	0
Pennsylvania Military	5	–	3	–	0	6	–	3	–	0
Johns Hopkins	2	–	3	–	1	3	–	4	–	1
Ursinus	2	–	5	–	0	2	–	5	–	0
Drexel	1	–	5	–	1	2	–	5	–	1
Haverford	0	–	6	–	1	0	–	6	–	1
West Chester *	0	–	0	–	0	7	–	2	–	0
Franklin & Marshall *	0	–	3	–	0	1	–	7	–	0
x – Division champion/co-champions; * – Ineligible for championship due to insufficient conference games; Rankings from major college AP poll for Rutgers and small college AP poll for Lehigh

The 1961 Swarthmore Garnet Tide football team was an American football team that represented Swarthmore College as a member of the Middle Atlantic Conference (MAC) during the 1961 college football season. In their 20th season under head coach Lew Elverson, the Garnet Tide compiled a 5–2 record (4–2 in conference games), tied for second place in the MAC Southern College Division, and outscored opponents by a total of 129 to 89.

The team played its home games at Alumni Field in Swarthmore, Pennsylvania. Swarthmore had a total enrollment of 975 students in 1961.

== Schedule ==
Date	Opponent	Site	Result	Attendance	Source
September 30	Dickinson*	Swarthmore, PA	W 23–18		
October 7	at Susquehanna	University Field; Selinsgrove, PA	L 12–34	4,000	
October 14	at C. W. Post*	Brookville, NY	W 14–13	3,000	
October 21	Ursinus	Swarthmore, PA	W 6–0		
November 4	at Johns Hopkins	Baltimore, MD	W 33–0		
November 11	Pennsylvania Military	Swarthmore, PA	L 7–18	4,000	
November 18	Haverford	Swarthmore, PA (rivalry)	W 34–6	3,500	
*Non-conference game

== Statistics ==
The team tallied 1,777 yards of total offense (253.8 yards per game), consisting of 1,124 rushing yards (160.5 yards per game) and 639 (91.2 yards per game). They did not lead the MAC Southern College Division in any category but ranked second in total offense, passing offense, and scoring. On defense, the Garnet Tide held opponents to 1,720 yards (245.7 yards per game) with 958 rushing yards (136.8 yards per game) and 706 passing yards (100.8 yards per game).

The team's statistical leaders included halfback Harvey Buek with 390 rushing yards and 476 yards of total offense; quarterback Mike Lillie with 361 passing yards; halfback Bernie Beitman with 11 receptions and 34 points scored (five touchdowns and two two-point conversions).
