= 1961 Lafayette Leopards football team =

American college football season

1961 Lafayette Leopards football
- Conference: Middle Atlantic Conference
- University Division
- Record: 2–6–1 (1–5–1 MAC)
- Head coach: James McConlogue (4th season)
- Captains: Walter Doleschal; Peter Lehr
- Home stadium: Fisher Field

1961 Middle Atlantic Conference football standings
	Conf.					Overall
Team	W		L		T	W		L		T
University Division
No. 15 Rutgers x	4	–	0	–	0	9	–	0	–	0
Bucknell	5	–	2	–	0	6	–	3	–	0
Delaware	3	–	2	–	0	4	–	4	–	0
No. 6 Lehigh	3	–	2	–	0	7	–	2	–	0
Gettysburg	2	–	2	–	1	3	–	5	–	1
Temple	1	–	2	–	2	2	–	5	–	2
Lafayette	1	–	5	–	1	2	–	6	–	1
Muhlenberg	0	–	4	–	0	2	–	7	–	0
Northern College Division
Susquehanna x	6	–	0	–	0	8	–	0	–	1
Albright	4	–	0	–	1	7	–	0	–	1
Moravian	4	–	1	–	1	4	–	3	–	1
Wagner	4	–	2	–	0	6	–	3	–	0
Lycoming	1	–	3	–	1	1	–	6	–	1
Wilkes	1	–	6	–	0	1	–	6	–	0
Hofstra *	2	–	0	–	0	7	–	2	–	0
Juniata *	1	–	2	–	0	3	–	4	–	0
Upsala *	0	–	4	–	0	0	–	7	–	0
Southern College Division
Lebanon Valley x	5	–	1	–	0	6	–	1	–	0
Swarthmore	4	–	2	–	0	5	–	2	–	0
Western Maryland	4	–	2	–	0	7	–	2	–	0
Dickinson	5	–	3	–	0	5	–	3	–	0
Pennsylvania Military	5	–	3	–	0	6	–	3	–	0
Johns Hopkins	2	–	3	–	1	3	–	4	–	1
Ursinus	2	–	5	–	0	2	–	5	–	0
Drexel	1	–	5	–	1	2	–	5	–	1
Haverford	0	–	6	–	1	0	–	6	–	1
West Chester *	0	–	0	–	0	7	–	2	–	0
Franklin & Marshall *	0	–	3	–	0	1	–	7	–	0
x – Division champion/co-champions; * – Ineligible for championship due to insufficient conference games; Rankings from major college AP poll for Rutgers and small college AP poll for Lehigh

The 1961 Lafayette Leopards football team was an American football team that represented Lafayette College during the 1961 college football season. Lafayette finished second-to-last in the Middle Atlantic Conference, University Division, and last in the Middle Three Conference.

In their fourth year under head coach James McConlogue, the Leopards compiled a 2–6–1 record. Walter Doleschal and Peter Lehr were the team captains.

In conference play, Lafayette went 1–5–1 against University Division opponents, for the division's seventh-best win percentage. The Leopards were swept by their Middle Three rivals, losing to both Lehigh and Rutgers.

Lafayette played its home games at Fisher Field on College Hill in Easton, Pennsylvania.

== Schedule ==
Date	Opponent	Site	Result	Attendance	Source
September 23	at Muhlenberg	Muhlenberg Field; Allentown, PA	W 14–13	4,000	
September 30	at Penn*	Franklin Field; Philadelphia, PA	L 7–14	14,411	
October 7	Delaware	Fisher Field; Easton, PA	L 0–34	6,000	
October 14	at Temple	Temple Stadium; Philadelphia, PA	T 12–12	3,000	
October 21	Bucknell	Fisher Field; Easton, PA	L 0–13	5,000	
October 28	at Gettysburg	Memorial Field; Gettysburg, PA	L 0–6	5,500	
November 4	Rutgers	Fisher Field; Easton, PA	L 6–37	6,500	
November 11	Tufts*	Fisher Field; Easton, PA	W 27–17		
November 18	at No. 15 Lehigh	Taylor Stadium; Bethlehem, PA (The Rivalry)	L 14–17	15,000	
*Non-conference game; Rankings from UPI Poll released prior to the game
