= 1961 Lebanon Valley Flying Dutchmen football team =

American college football season

1961 Lebanon Valley Flying Dutchmen football

MAC Southern College Division champion
- Conference: Middle Atlantic Conference
- Southern College Division
- Record: 6–1 (5–1 MAC)
- Head coach: William D. McHenry (1st season)

1961 Middle Atlantic Conference football standings
	Conf.					Overall
Team	W		L		T	W		L		T
University Division
No. 15 Rutgers x	4	–	0	–	0	9	–	0	–	0
Bucknell	5	–	2	–	0	6	–	3	–	0
Delaware	3	–	2	–	0	4	–	4	–	0
No. 6 Lehigh	3	–	2	–	0	7	–	2	–	0
Gettysburg	2	–	2	–	1	3	–	5	–	1
Temple	1	–	2	–	2	2	–	5	–	2
Lafayette	1	–	5	–	1	2	–	6	–	1
Muhlenberg	0	–	4	–	0	2	–	7	–	0
Northern College Division
Susquehanna x	6	–	0	–	0	8	–	0	–	1
Albright	4	–	0	–	1	7	–	0	–	1
Moravian	4	–	1	–	1	4	–	3	–	1
Wagner	4	–	2	–	0	6	–	3	–	0
Lycoming	1	–	3	–	1	1	–	6	–	1
Wilkes	1	–	6	–	0	1	–	6	–	0
Hofstra *	2	–	0	–	0	7	–	2	–	0
Juniata *	1	–	2	–	0	3	–	4	–	0
Upsala *	0	–	4	–	0	0	–	7	–	0
Southern College Division
Lebanon Valley x	5	–	1	–	0	6	–	1	–	0
Swarthmore	4	–	2	–	0	5	–	2	–	0
Western Maryland	4	–	2	–	0	7	–	2	–	0
Dickinson	5	–	3	–	0	5	–	3	–	0
Pennsylvania Military	5	–	3	–	0	6	–	3	–	0
Johns Hopkins	2	–	3	–	1	3	–	4	–	1
Ursinus	2	–	5	–	0	2	–	5	–	0
Drexel	1	–	5	–	1	2	–	5	–	1
Haverford	0	–	6	–	1	0	–	6	–	1
West Chester *	0	–	0	–	0	7	–	2	–	0
Franklin & Marshall *	0	–	3	–	0	1	–	7	–	0
x – Division champion/co-champions; * – Ineligible for championship due to insufficient conference games; Rankings from major college AP poll for Rutgers and small college AP poll for Lehigh

The 1961 Lebanon Valley Flying Dutchmen football team was an American football team that represented Lebanon Valley College of Annville, Pennsylvania, as a member of the Middle Atlantic Conference (MAC) during the 1961 college football season. In their first year under head coach William D. McHenry, the Dutchmen compiled a 6–1 record (5–1 in MAC games), finished in a tie for second place in the MAC Southern College Division, and outscored opponents by a total of 134 to 86.

The team tallied 1,623 yards of total offense (231.8 yards per game), consisting of 1,284 rushing yards and 339 passing yards. On defense, Lebanon Valley held opponents to 1,405 yards of total offense (200.7 yards per game). Quarterback Wes MacMillen led the team in multiple categories, including rushing yards (303 yards), passing yards (199 yards), total offense (502 yards), and scoring (44 points).

The team played its home games at Lebanon High School Stadium in Lebanon, Pennsylvania.

== Schedule ==
Date	Opponent	Site	Result	Attendance	Source
September 30	at Drexel	Drexel Field; Philadelphia, PA	W 17–6	2,500–3,000	
October 14	at Muhlenberg*	Allentown, PA	W 15–6	1,500	
October 21	Moravian	Lebanon High School Stadium; Lebanon, PA	W 37–14	1,500	
October 28	Dickinson	Lebanon High School Stadium; Lebanon, PA	W 16–7	4,500	
November 4	Albright	Lebanon High School Stadium; Lebanon, PA	L 7–33	5,500	
November 11	at Ursinus	Collegeville, PA	W 27–6	1,500–2,000	
November 18	at Pennsylvania Military	Chester, PA	W 15–14	2,500	
*Non-conference game
