= 1961 Lehigh Engineers football team =

American college football season

1961 Lehigh Engineers football

Lambert Cup
- Conference: Middle Atlantic Conference
- University Division
- Record: 7–2 (3–2 MAC)
- Head coach: Bill Leckonby (16th season)
- Captain: Michael Semcheski
- Home stadium: Taylor Stadium

1961 Middle Atlantic Conference football standings
	Conf.					Overall
Team	W		L		T	W		L		T
University Division
No. 15 Rutgers x	4	–	0	–	0	9	–	0	–	0
Bucknell	5	–	2	–	0	6	–	3	–	0
Delaware	3	–	2	–	0	4	–	4	–	0
No. 6 Lehigh	3	–	2	–	0	7	–	2	–	0
Gettysburg	2	–	2	–	1	3	–	5	–	1
Temple	1	–	2	–	2	2	–	5	–	2
Lafayette	1	–	5	–	1	2	–	6	–	1
Muhlenberg	0	–	4	–	0	2	–	7	–	0
Northern College Division
Susquehanna x	6	–	0	–	0	8	–	0	–	1
Albright	4	–	0	–	1	7	–	0	–	1
Moravian	4	–	1	–	1	4	–	3	–	1
Wagner	4	–	2	–	0	6	–	3	–	0
Lycoming	1	–	3	–	1	1	–	6	–	1
Wilkes	1	–	6	–	0	1	–	6	–	0
Hofstra *	2	–	0	–	0	7	–	2	–	0
Juniata *	1	–	2	–	0	3	–	4	–	0
Upsala *	0	–	4	–	0	0	–	7	–	0
Southern College Division
Lebanon Valley x	5	–	1	–	0	6	–	1	–	0
Swarthmore	4	–	2	–	0	5	–	2	–	0
Western Maryland	4	–	2	–	0	7	–	2	–	0
Dickinson	5	–	3	–	0	5	–	3	–	0
Pennsylvania Military	5	–	3	–	0	6	–	3	–	0
Johns Hopkins	2	–	3	–	1	3	–	4	–	1
Ursinus	2	–	5	–	0	2	–	5	–	0
Drexel	1	–	5	–	1	2	–	5	–	1
Haverford	0	–	6	–	1	0	–	6	–	1
West Chester *	0	–	0	–	0	7	–	2	–	0
Franklin & Marshall *	0	–	3	–	0	1	–	7	–	0
x – Division champion/co-champions; * – Ineligible for championship due to insufficient conference games; Rankings from major college AP poll for Rutgers and small college AP poll for Lehigh

The 1961 Lehigh Engineers football team was an American football team that represented Lehigh University during the 1961 college football season. Despite not winning either of its two conferences, Lehigh was awarded the Lambert Cup as the best small-college football team in the East.

In their 16th year under head coach Bill Leckonby, the Engineers compiled a 7–2 record. Michael Semcheski was the team captain.

In conference play, Lehigh's 3–2 record against opponents in the Middle Atlantic Conference, University Division, secured a tie with Delaware, and placed them behind Rutgers (4–0) and Bucknell (5–2). The Engineers went 1–1 against the Middle Three, losing to Rutgers and beating Lafayette.

The Engineers were a sporadic entry on the national small college rankings. Lehigh was rated No. 9, with one first-place vote, in the October 5, 1961 AP poll, but dropped out of the top 10 the next week. The team returned to the AP rankings on November 9, 1961, at No. 8, before rising the next week to No. 6, its eventual year-end ranking. The season's first UPI coaches poll did not place Lehigh in the top 20, though the Engineers made it to No. 19 for two weeks in October 1961 before returning for good in mid-November 1961. Following the rivalry victory over Lafayette, Lehigh climbed to a final ranking of No. 11 in the coaches poll.

In both polls, Lehigh ended up the top-ranked team in the geographic area covered by the Lambert awards. Rutgers, which defeated Lehigh and won both conferences, was considered a "major" university and not eligible for the Lambert Cup. Of the eight members of the Lambert selection committee, seven listed Lehigh as their No. 1 choice, with the eighth listing it as No. 2. As the winners of the inaugural small-college Lambert Cup in 1957, Lehigh became the first college to receive the award twice.

Lehigh played its home games at Taylor Stadium on the university campus in Bethlehem, Pennsylvania.

== Schedule ==
Date	Opponent	Rank	Site	Result	Attendance	Source
September 23	at Delaware		Delaware Stadium; Newark, DE (rivalry)	L 6–14	7,100	
September 30	at Harvard*		Harvard Stadium; Boston, MA	W 22–17	11,000	
October 7	at Gettysburg		Memorial Field; Gettysburg, PA	W 20–6	5,000	
October 14	Merchant Marine*	No. 19	Taylor Stadium; Bethlehem, PA	W 20–6	6,000	
October 21	at Rutgers	No. 19	Rutgers Stadium; Piscataway, NJ	L 15–32	17,000	
October 28	at Columbia*		Baker Field; New York, NY	W 14–7	10,000–10,429	
November 4	Colgate		Taylor Stadium; Bethlehem, PA	W 20–15	10,000	
November 11	Bucknell	No. 11	Taylor Stadium; Bethlehem, PA	W 12–7	11,000	
November 18	Lafayette	No. 15	Taylor Stadium; Bethlehem, PA (The Rivalry)	W 17–14	15,000	
*Non-conference game; Rankings from UPI Poll released prior to the game
