= 1961 Delaware Fightin' Blue Hens football team =

American college football season

1961 Delaware Fightin' Blue Hens football
- Conference: Middle Atlantic Conference
- University Division
- Record: 4–4 (3–2 MAC)
- Head coach: David M. Nelson (11th season)
- Captains: Bill Grossman (injured); John Scholato (acting)
- Home stadium: Delaware Stadium

1961 Middle Atlantic Conference football standings
	Conf.					Overall
Team	W		L		T	W		L		T
University Division
No. 15 Rutgers x	4	–	0	–	0	9	–	0	–	0
Bucknell	5	–	2	–	0	6	–	3	–	0
Delaware	3	–	2	–	0	4	–	4	–	0
No. 6 Lehigh	3	–	2	–	0	7	–	2	–	0
Gettysburg	2	–	2	–	1	3	–	5	–	1
Temple	1	–	2	–	2	2	–	5	–	2
Lafayette	1	–	5	–	1	2	–	6	–	1
Muhlenberg	0	–	4	–	0	2	–	7	–	0
Northern College Division
Susquehanna x	6	–	0	–	0	8	–	0	–	1
Albright	4	–	0	–	1	7	–	0	–	1
Moravian	4	–	1	–	1	4	–	3	–	1
Wagner	4	–	2	–	0	6	–	3	–	0
Lycoming	1	–	3	–	1	1	–	6	–	1
Wilkes	1	–	6	–	0	1	–	6	–	0
Hofstra *	2	–	0	–	0	7	–	2	–	0
Juniata *	1	–	2	–	0	3	–	4	–	0
Upsala *	0	–	4	–	0	0	–	7	–	0
Southern College Division
Lebanon Valley x	5	–	1	–	0	6	–	1	–	0
Swarthmore	4	–	2	–	0	5	–	2	–	0
Western Maryland	4	–	2	–	0	7	–	2	–	0
Dickinson	5	–	3	–	0	5	–	3	–	0
Pennsylvania Military	5	–	3	–	0	6	–	3	–	0
Johns Hopkins	2	–	3	–	1	3	–	4	–	1
Ursinus	2	–	5	–	0	2	–	5	–	0
Drexel	1	–	5	–	1	2	–	5	–	1
Haverford	0	–	6	–	1	0	–	6	–	1
West Chester *	0	–	0	–	0	7	–	2	–	0
Franklin & Marshall *	0	–	3	–	0	1	–	7	–	0
x – Division champion/co-champions; * – Ineligible for championship due to insufficient conference games; Rankings from major college AP poll for Rutgers and small college AP poll for Lehigh

The 1961 Delaware Fightin' Blue Hens football team was an American football team that represented the University of Delaware in the Middle Atlantic Conference (MAC) during the 1961 college football season. In its 11th season under head coach David M. Nelson, the team compiled a 4–4 record (3–2 in MAC games), tied for third place in the MAC University Division, and outscored opponents by a total of 161 to 98.

Sophomore halfback Mike Brown led the team in both rushing (404 yards) and scoring (seven touchdowns). Three Delaware players were selected as first-team players on the 1961 All-MAC football team: center/linebacker Johnny Scholato; halfback Karl Lorenz; and guard Earl Ritchie.

The team played its home games at Delaware Stadium in Newark, Delaware.

== Schedule ==
Date	Opponent	Rank	Site	Result	Attendance	Source
September 23	Lehigh		Delaware Stadium; Newark, DE (rivalry)	W 14–6	7,000–7,100	
September 30	Buffalo*		Delaware Stadium; Newark, DE	W 36–12	6,200–7,000	
October 7	at Lafayette	No. 8	Fisher Field; Easton, PA	W 34–0	6,000	
October 14	at Hofstra*	No. 5	Hofstra College Stadium; Hempstead, NY	L 0–14	4,200–6,000	
October 28	Ohio*^{†}		Delaware Stadium; Newark, DE	L 16–17	8,750	
November 4	Temple		Delaware Stadium; Newark, DE	W 28–0	6,200	
November 11	at Rutgers	No. 12	Rutgers Stadium; New Brunswick, NJ	L 19–27	22,000	
November 18	at Bucknell		Memorial Stadium; Lewisburg, PA	L 14–22	6,000	
*Non-conference game; ^{†}Homecoming; Rankings from UPI Coaches Poll released prior to the game

== Statistics ==
Delaware tallied 2,245 yards of total offense (280.5 per game), consisting of 1,524 rushing yards (190.5 per game) and 720 passing yards (90 per game). On defense, the team gave up 1,624 yards (204.4 per game), including 813 rushing yards and 811 passing yards.

Sophomore halfback Mike Brown led the team in rushing with 404 yards in 89 carries for an average of 4.5 yards per carry. A sprinter for the track team, Brown was the fastest man on the team. The team's other rushing leaders were Joe Slobojan (354 yards, 89 carries), Johnny Wallace (201 yards), and Karl Lorenz (177 yards).

Brown also led the team in scoring with seven touchdowns, including one on an interception returned for a score. The other scoring leaders were Slobojan (30 points) and Wallace (23 points).

Quarterback Ted Kempski led the team in passing, completing 40 of 85 passes for 606 yards, three touchdowns and three interceptions.

The team's receiving leaders were end Ollie Baker (165 yards, six catchers), end Dick Broadbent (132 yards, 10 receptions), end Barry Fetterman (118 yards, eight reception), and Johnny Wallace (100 yards, five receptions).

End Arnie Rozental led the team in punting with 37 punts for 1,314 yards (36.5 yards per punt).

== Awards ==
Tackle Bill Grossman was selected as the 1961 team captain, but he sustained an eye injury in the opening game and missed the remainder of the season. Center and linebacker John Scholato served as acting team captains in several games following the injury to Grossman.

Three Delaware players were selected as first-team players on the 1961 All-MAC football team: center/linebacker Johnny Scholato; halfback Karl Lorenz; and guard Earl Ritchie. Halfback Mike Brown was named to the second team. Honorable mention was given to end Dick Broadbend, tackles Dick Evers and Paul Chesmore, guard Jim Quirk, and backs Ted Kempski, Joe Slobojan, and John Wallace.

Ted Kempski was later inducted into the Delaware Sports Museum and Hall of Fame.

== Players ==
The following 30 players received varsity letters for their participation in the 1961 Delaware football team:

1. Oliver Baker, senior
2. Robert Brayer, senior
3. Richard Broadbent, senior
4. Michael Brown, sophomore
5. Paul Chesmore, junior
6. Arthur Coury, senior
7. Robert Dowling, junior
8. Theodore Elder, senior
9. Richard Evers, sophomore
10. Barry Fetterman, senior
11. William Grossman, senior
12. Thomas Harrison, sophomore
13. Gary Hebert, senior
14. Theodore Kempski, junior
15. Karl Lorenz, junior
16. Ronald McCoy, junior
17. Thomas Michaels, junior
18. Leonard Nelson, senior
19. Raymond Otlowski, senior
20. James Quirk, junior
21. William Regan, senior
22. Earl Ritchie, senior
23. Arnie Rozental, sophomore
24. John Scholato, junior
25. Kenneth Schroeck, senior
26. Thomas Skidmore, senior
27. Joseph Slobojan, junior
28. John Wallace, sophomore
29. Clinton Ware, junior
30. Charles Zolak, sophomore
