= 1961 Albright Lions football team =

American college football season

1961 Albright Lions football
- Conference: Middle Atlantic Conference
- Northern College Division
- Record: 7–0–1 (4–0–1 MAC)
- Head coach: John Potsklan (7th season)
- Home stadium: Albright Stadium

1961 Middle Atlantic Conference football standings
	Conf.					Overall
Team	W		L		T	W		L		T
University Division
No. 15 Rutgers x	4	–	0	–	0	9	–	0	–	0
Bucknell	5	–	2	–	0	6	–	3	–	0
Delaware	3	–	2	–	0	4	–	4	–	0
No. 6 Lehigh	3	–	2	–	0	7	–	2	–	0
Gettysburg	2	–	2	–	1	3	–	5	–	1
Temple	1	–	2	–	2	2	–	5	–	2
Lafayette	1	–	5	–	1	2	–	6	–	1
Muhlenberg	0	–	4	–	0	2	–	7	–	0
Northern College Division
Susquehanna x	6	–	0	–	0	8	–	0	–	1
Albright	4	–	0	–	1	7	–	0	–	1
Moravian	4	–	1	–	1	4	–	3	–	1
Wagner	4	–	2	–	0	6	–	3	–	0
Lycoming	1	–	3	–	1	1	–	6	–	1
Wilkes	1	–	6	–	0	1	–	6	–	0
Hofstra *	2	–	0	–	0	7	–	2	–	0
Juniata *	1	–	2	–	0	3	–	4	–	0
Upsala *	0	–	4	–	0	0	–	7	–	0
Southern College Division
Lebanon Valley x	5	–	1	–	0	6	–	1	–	0
Swarthmore	4	–	2	–	0	5	–	2	–	0
Western Maryland	4	–	2	–	0	7	–	2	–	0
Dickinson	5	–	3	–	0	5	–	3	–	0
Pennsylvania Military	5	–	3	–	0	6	–	3	–	0
Johns Hopkins	2	–	3	–	1	3	–	4	–	1
Ursinus	2	–	5	–	0	2	–	5	–	0
Drexel	1	–	5	–	1	2	–	5	–	1
Haverford	0	–	6	–	1	0	–	6	–	1
West Chester *	0	–	0	–	0	7	–	2	–	0
Franklin & Marshall *	0	–	3	–	0	1	–	7	–	0
x – Division champion/co-champions; * – Ineligible for championship due to insufficient conference games; Rankings from major college AP poll for Rutgers and small college AP poll for Lehigh

The 1961 Albright Lions football team was an American football team that represented Albright College of Reading, Pennsylvania, as a member of the Middle Atlantic Conference (MAC) during the 1961 college football season. In their seventh year under head coach John Potsklan, the Lions compiled a 7–0–1 record (4–0–1 in MAC games), finished second in the MAC Northern College Division, and outscored opponents by a total of 264 to 68.

Coaches of the MAC Northern College Division selected quarterback Gary Chapman as the most valuable player in the division. Chapman and three other Albright players received first-team honors on the 1961 MAC Southern College Division all-star team. The other three honorees were end Gary Sheeler; tackle George Reagan; and guard George Sighman.

Chapman and Sheeler were also selected by the Associated Press as first-team players on the 1961 All-Pennsylvania football team. Reagan was named to the second team.

The Lions played their home games at Albright Stadium in Reading, Pennsylvania.

== Schedule ==
Date	Time	Opponent	Site	Result	Attendance	Source
September 30		Muhlenberg*	Albright Stadium; Reading, PA	W 52–20		
October 7	8:00 p.m.	Drexel	Albright Stadium; Reading, PA	W 47–6	4,500-5,000	
October 14		at Gettysburg	Gettysburg, PA	W 37–21		
October 21		Youngstown*	Albright Stadium; Reading, PA	W 20–6	2,500	
October 28		at Moravian	Moravian Field; Bethlehem, PA	T 8–8	3,500	
November 4		at Lebanon Valley	Lebanon High School Stadium; Lebanon, PA	W 33–7	5,500	
November 11		Juniata	Albright Stadium; Reading, PA (Shrine Pretzel Bowl)	W 21–0	9,000	
November 18		Franklin & Marshall	Albright Stadium; Reading, PA	W 46–0	4,000	
*Non-conference game; All times are in Eastern time

== Statistics ==
The team tallied 2,814 yards of total offense (351.75 yards per game), consisting of 1,708 rushing yards (213.5 yards per game) and 1,106 passing yards (138.25 yards per game). On defense, Albright held opponents to 1,186 yards of total offense (148.25 yards per game) with 648 rushing yards (81 yards per game) and 538 passing yards (67.25 yards per game).

The team's individual statistical leaders included halfback Tom Olivo with 561 rushing yards, quarterback Gary Chapman with 974 passing yards and 1,074 yards of total offense, end Steve Simon with 19 receptions for 360 yards, and halfback Doug Deicke with 57 points scored (7 touchdowns and 15 extra point kicks). Olivo broke Albright's all-time scoring record, surpassing the mark set by Dick Riffle from 1935 to 1937.
