= 1961 Hofstra Flying Dutchmen football team =

American college football season

1961 Hofstra Flying Dutchmen football
- Conference: Middle Atlantic Conference
- Northern College Division
- Record: 7–2 (2–0 MAC)
- Head coach: Howdy Myers (12th season)
- Captains: Bob DeNeef; Lou DiBlasi
- Home stadium: Hofstra College Stadium

1961 Middle Atlantic Conference football standings
	Conf.					Overall
Team	W		L		T	W		L		T
University Division
No. 15 Rutgers x	4	–	0	–	0	9	–	0	–	0
Bucknell	5	–	2	–	0	6	–	3	–	0
Delaware	3	–	2	–	0	4	–	4	–	0
No. 6 Lehigh	3	–	2	–	0	7	–	2	–	0
Gettysburg	2	–	2	–	1	3	–	5	–	1
Temple	1	–	2	–	2	2	–	5	–	2
Lafayette	1	–	5	–	1	2	–	6	–	1
Muhlenberg	0	–	4	–	0	2	–	7	–	0
Northern College Division
Susquehanna x	6	–	0	–	0	8	–	0	–	1
Albright	4	–	0	–	1	7	–	0	–	1
Moravian	4	–	1	–	1	4	–	3	–	1
Wagner	4	–	2	–	0	6	–	3	–	0
Lycoming	1	–	3	–	1	1	–	6	–	1
Wilkes	1	–	6	–	0	1	–	6	–	0
Hofstra *	2	–	0	–	0	7	–	2	–	0
Juniata *	1	–	2	–	0	3	–	4	–	0
Upsala *	0	–	4	–	0	0	–	7	–	0
Southern College Division
Lebanon Valley x	5	–	1	–	0	6	–	1	–	0
Swarthmore	4	–	2	–	0	5	–	2	–	0
Western Maryland	4	–	2	–	0	7	–	2	–	0
Dickinson	5	–	3	–	0	5	–	3	–	0
Pennsylvania Military	5	–	3	–	0	6	–	3	–	0
Johns Hopkins	2	–	3	–	1	3	–	4	–	1
Ursinus	2	–	5	–	0	2	–	5	–	0
Drexel	1	–	5	–	1	2	–	5	–	1
Haverford	0	–	6	–	1	0	–	6	–	1
West Chester *	0	–	0	–	0	7	–	2	–	0
Franklin & Marshall *	0	–	3	–	0	1	–	7	–	0
x – Division champion/co-champions; * – Ineligible for championship due to insufficient conference games; Rankings from major college AP poll for Rutgers and small college AP poll for Lehigh

The 1961 Hofstra Flying Dutchmen football team was an American football team that represented Hofstra College during the 1961 college football season. Hofstra had one of the better records in the Northern College Division of the Middle Atlantic Conference (MAC), but was ineligible for the championship.

In their 12th year under head coach Howard "Howdy" Myers Jr., the Flying Dutchmen compiled a 7–2 record, and outscored opponents 168 to 41. Pete Carew, Dick Cooney and Tim Gannon were the team captains.

Hofstra was one of three teams in the MAC Northern Division that finished the year undefeated in conference play. The other two, Susquehanna and Albright, finished in first and second place, but Hofstra was excluded from title contention. Conference rules required teams to play at least five games against opponents from the MAC's two "college" divisions, and Hofstra only played two. Three of its games were against MAC University Division members (Delaware, Gettysburg and Temple), but these did not count as conference games.

The Flying Dutchmen played their home games at Hofstra College Stadium in Hempstead on Long Island, New York.

== Schedule ==
Date	Opponent	Rank	Site	Result	Attendance	Source
September 30	at Lycoming		Bowman Field; Williamsport, PA	W 20–7	800	
October 7	at Upsala		Walker Stadium; East Orange, NJ	W 44–0	3,000	
October 14	No. 5 Delaware*		Hofstra College Stadium; Hempstead, NY	W 14–0	4,200–6,000	
October 21	at Merchant Marine*	No. 8	Tomb Field; Kings Point, NY	W 8–7	4,500–5,000	
October 28	at Temple*	No. 7	Temple Stadium; Philadelphia, PA	L 12–14	6,500	
November 4	Gettysburg*	No. 20	Hofstra College Stadium; Hempstead, NY	L 6–7	2,900	
November 11	Rhode Island*		Hofstra College Stadium; Hempstead, NY	W 12–0	4,233–5,000	
November 18	Springfield*		Pratt Field; Springfield, MA	W 28–0	3,000	
November 23	C.W. Post*		Hofstra College Stadium; Hempstead, NY	W 24–6	7,700	
*Non-conference game; Rankings from UPI Poll released prior to the game
