= 1961 Northeast Louisiana State Indians football team =

American college football season

1961 Northeast Louisiana State Indians football
- Conference: Gulf States Conference
- Record: 3–7 (1–4 GSC)
- Head coach: Jack C. Rowan (4th season)
- Home stadium: Brown Stadium

1961 Gulf States Conference football standings
	Conf.					Overall
Team	W		L		T	W		L		T
No. 7 Southeastern Louisiana +	4	–	1	–	0	9	–	1	–	0
No. 10 McNeese State +	4	–	1	–	0	7	–	2	–	0
Northwestern State	3	–	2	–	0	7	–	3	–	0
Louisiana Tech	3	–	2	–	0	5	–	4	–	0
Northeast Louisiana State	1	–	4	–	0	3	–	7	–	0
Southwestern Louisiana	0	–	5	–	0	2	–	8	–	0
+ – Conference co-champions; Rankings from NAIA poll

The 1961 Northeast Louisiana State Indians football team was an American football team that represented Northeast Louisiana State College (now known as the University of Louisiana at Monroe) in the Gulf States Conference (GSC) during the 1961 college football season. In their fourth year under head coach Jack C. Rowan, the team compiled a 3–7 record (1–4 in conference games), finished in fifth place in the GSC, and were outscored by a total of 171 to 145.

The team's statistical leaders included quarterback Ronnie Myrick (322 passing yards, 581 yards of total offense), fullback William Ragan (382 rushing yards, 31 points scored), and end Dewey Smith (118 receiving yards).

The team played its home games at Brown Stadium in Monroe, Louisiana.

== Schedule ==
Date	Opponent	Site	Result	Attendance	Source
September 16	Mexico Polytechical Institute*	Brown Stadium; Monroe, LA	W 28–0	5,000	
September 23	at Lamar Tech*	Greenie Stadium; Beaumont, TX	L 34–38	7,000–7,100	
September 30	East Texas State*	Brown Stadium; Monroe, LA	W 36–0	5,500	
October 7	at Northwestern State	Demon Stadium; Natchitoches, LA (rivalry)	L 7–28	6,000	
October 14	McNeese State	Brown Stadium; Monroe, LA	L 0–7	4,500–4,800	
October 21	No. 3 Southeastern Louisiana	Brown Stadium; Monroe, LA	L 0–7	3,000–4,250	
October 28	vs. Southwestern Louisiana	State Fair Stadium; Shreveport, LA (rivalry)	W 27–20	4,000	
November 4	Delta State*	Brown Stadium; Monroe, LA	L 0–9	5,600–5,700	
November 11	Arlington State*	Brown Stadium; Monroe, LA	L 6–35	2,500	
November 18	at Louisiana Tech	Tech Stadium; Ruston, LA (rivalry)	L 7–27	7,000–7,500	
*Non-conference game; Rankings from AP Poll released prior to the game

== Statistics ==
The Indians gained 2,429 yards of total offense (242.9 per game), consisting of 1,899 rushing yards (189.9 per game) and 530 passing yards (53.0 per game). On defense, they allowed opponents to gain 2,572 yards (257.2 per game), including 1,544 rushing yards (154.3 per game) and 928 passing yards (92.8 per game).

Quarterback Ronnie Myrick led the team in both passing and total offense. He completed 25 of 57 passes for 322 yards with no touchdowns and six interceptions. He also gained 259 rushing yards for 581 yards of total offense. He ranked second on the team in scoring with 30 points on five touchdowns.

Fullback William Ragan led the team in both rushing and scoring. He gained 382 rushing yards on 75 carries and scored 31 points on two touchdowns, 17 extra points, and a two-point conversion run.

End Dewey Smith was the team's leading receiver with four cathes for 118 yards.

Gordon Salsman was the team's punter, averaging 34.08 yards on 48 punts.

== Awards and honors ==
Guard Ross Nolan was selected by the writers as a first-team player on the 1961 All-Gulf States Conference football team. He was named to the second team by the coaches. Guard Larry Rambin received second-team honors from both the writers and coaches. Back Willie Ragan was also named to the second team by the writers.
