= 1961 Northwestern State Demons football team =

American college football season

1961 Northwestern State Demons football
- Conference: Gulf States Conference
- Record: 7–3 (3–2 GSC)
- Head coach: Jack Clayton (5th season)
- Home stadium: Demon Stadium

1961 Gulf States Conference football standings
	Conf.					Overall
Team	W		L		T	W		L		T
No. 7 Southeastern Louisiana +	4	–	1	–	0	9	–	1	–	0
No. 10 McNeese State +	4	–	1	–	0	7	–	2	–	0
Northwestern State	3	–	2	–	0	7	–	3	–	0
Louisiana Tech	3	–	2	–	0	5	–	4	–	0
Northeast Louisiana State	1	–	4	–	0	3	–	7	–	0
Southwestern Louisiana	0	–	5	–	0	2	–	8	–	0
+ – Conference co-champions; Rankings from NAIA poll

The 1961 Northwestern State Demons football team was an American football team that represented Northwestern State College of Louisiana (now known as Northwestern State University) as a member of the Gulf States Conference (GSC) during the 1961 college football season. In their fifth year under head coach Jack Clayton, the Demons compiled a 7–3 record (3–2 in conference games) and tied for third place in the GSC.

On October 27, the Demons were tied for No. 7 in the AP small college football rankings with Hofstra. They lost three of their last four games and dropped out of the rankings.

The team played its home games at Demon Stadium in Natchitoches, Louisiana.

== Schedule ==
Date	Time	Opponent	Rank	Site	Result	Attendance	Source
September 16	8:00 p.m.	vs. Stephen F. Austin*		State Fair Stadium; Shreveport, LA (rivalry)	W 35–19	6,000	
September 23		Mexico Polytechical Institute*		Demon Stadium; Natchitoches, LA	W 55–8	>6,000	
September 30	8:00 p.m.	at Louisiana College*		Bolton Stadium; Alexandria, LA	W 7–6	8,000	
October 7		Northeast Louisiana State		Demon Stadium; Natchitoches, LA (rivalry)	W 28–7	6,000	
October 14		Corpus Christi*		Demon Stadium; Natchitoches, LA	W 57–6	4,000	
October 21		vs. Louisiana Tech		State Fair Stadium; Shreveport, LA (rivalry)	W 19–7	22,000–27,000	
October 28		at Arkansas*	No. T–7	War Memorial Stadium; Little Rock, AR	L 7–42	31,500	
November 4		McNeese State		Demon Stadium; Natchitoches, LA (rivalry)	L 14–28	7,000	
November 11		at Southwestern Louisiana		McNaspy Stadium; Lafayette, LA	W 27–14	6,000–6,500	
November 18		at No. 9 Southeastern Louisiana		Strawberry Stadium; Hammond, LA (rivalry)	L 0–19	6,500	
*Non-conference game; Rankings from AP Poll released prior to the game; All times are in Central time

== Statistics ==
The Demons gained 2,657 yards of total offense (265.7 per game), consisting of 1,703 rushing yards (170.3 per game) and 954 passing yars (95.4 per game). On defense, they allowed opponents to gain 2,290 yards (229.0 per game), including 1,404 rushing yards (140.4 per game) and 886 passing yards (88.6 per game).

Halfback Kenny Thompson led the team with 363 rushing yards on 58 carries. He also led the team in total offense and scoring (48 points on eight touhdowns).

Quarterback Don Beasley completed 25 of 67 passes for 316 yards with three touchdowns and six interceptions. He ranked second on the team with 349 yards of total offense (316 passing yards, 33 rushing yards).

Halfback Gary Moore led the team in receiving with eight catches for 152 yards and two touchdowns.

Steve Murphy punted 52 times for an average of 34.2 yards per punt.

== Awards and honors ==
Halback Kenny Thompson received first-team honors on the 1961 All-Gulf States Conference football team. Tackle Octave Bernard and guard Jerry Fowler were named to the second team.
