= Alfred L. Atwood =

American football player and coach (1886–1965)

Biographical details
- Born: September 29, 1886; Norwood, Massachusetts, U.S.
- Died: August 19, 1965 (aged 78); Norwood, Massachusetts, U.S.

Playing career
- 1907–1909: Amhrest
- Position: Halfback

Coaching career (HC unless noted)
- 1910: Haverford

Alfred Loranus Atwood (September 29, 1886 – August 19, 1965) was an American football player and coach. A college football player and graduate of Amherst College, Atwood served as the head football coach at Haverford College in 1910.

Atwood was born on September 29, 1886, in Norwood, Massachusetts, to Horace T. and Clara Talbot Atwood. He pursued graduate work at the University of Pennsylvania and graduated from Boston University School of Law. Atwood later worked as a lawyer and a realtor. He died on August 19, 1965, at his home in Norwood.
