= William D. McHenry =

American football player and coach (1932–2023)

Biographical details
- Born: June 20, 1932; Swarthmore, Pennsylvania, U.S.
- Died: January 4, 2023 (aged 90); Hilton Head Island, South Carolina, U.S.

Playing career

Football
- 1950–1953: Washington and Lee
- Position: Center

Coaching career (HC unless noted)

Football
- 1954–1957: Pennsylvania Military (assistant)
- 1958–1960: Williams (assistant)
- 1961–1970: Lebanon Valley
- 1973–1977: Washington and Lee

Lacrosse
- 1959–1960: Williams

Administrative career (AD unless noted)
- 1971–1991: Washington and Lee
- 1991–1996: Wooster

Head coaching record
- Overall: 56–70–3 (football)

Accomplishments and honors

Championships
- 2 MAC Southern College Division (1961, 1969)

William Dunlap McHenry (June 20, 1932 – January 4, 2023) was an American football and lacrosse player and coach and college athletics administrator. An accomplished athlete at Washington and Lee University in Lexington, Virginia, McHenry was chosen by the Washington Redskins in the sixth round of the 1954 NFL draft. He also played lacrosse at Washington and Lee. McHenry served as the head coach at Lebanon Valley College in Pennsylvania from 1961 to 1970 before returning to his alma mater in 1973 where remained for five seasons, compiling a career college football coaching record of 56–70–3. In 1958, McHenry was hired as the head lacrosse coach at Williams College, where he also worked as an assistant football coach. McHenry finished his career in athletics by serving as the athletic director at the College of Wooster from 1991 until his retirement in 1996.

Dunlap died on January 4, 2023, in Hilton Head Island, South Carolina.

== Head coaching record ==
=== Football ===
Year	Team	Overall	Conference	Standing	Bowl/playoffs
Lebanon Valley Flying Dutchmen (Middle Atlantic Conference) (1961–1970)
1961	Lebanon Valley	6–1	5–1	1st (Southern College)	
1962	Lebanon Valley	5–3	4–2	T–3rd (Southern College)	
1963	Lebanon Valley	4–3	4–3	6th (Southern College)	
1964	Lebanon Valley	4–4	4–4	T–4th(Southern College)	
1965	Lebanon Valley	5–3	4–3	4th (Southern College)	
1966	Lebanon Valley	2–6	2–6	T–8th (Southern College)	
1967	Lebanon Valley	3–5	3–5	T–4th (Southern College)	
1968	Lebanon Valley	4–4	4–4	T–4th (Southern College)	
1969	Lebanon Valley	6–2	5–2	T–1st (Southern College)	
1970	Lebanon Valley	5–3–1	5–2–1	4th (Southern)	
Lebanon Valley:		44–34–1			
Washington and Lee Generals (NCAA Division III independent) (1973)
1973	Washington and Lee	2–7			
Washington and Lee Generals (Virginia College Athletic Association) (1974–1975)
1974	Washington and Lee	1–8–1	0–2–1		
1975	Washington and Lee	1–8–1	0–3	T–8th	
Washington and Lee Generals (Old Dominion Athletic Conference) (1976–1977)
1976	Washington and Lee	5–5	2–2	T–3rd	
1977	Washington and Lee	3–8	1–3	4th	
Washington and Lee:		12–36–2	3–10–1		
Total:		56–70–3			
National championship Conference title Conference division title or championship game berth
