= Les DeVall =

American football player and coach (1919–2008)

Biographical details
- Born: May 2, 1919; Ellisville, Mississippi, U.S.
- Died: August 27, 2008 (aged 89); Lake Charles, Louisiana, U.S.

Playing career

Football
- 1940–1941: Mississippi Southern
- Position: Blocking back

Coaching career (HC unless noted)

Football
- 1945–1953: Hinds
- 1954–1955: William Carey
- 1956: Louisiana College
- 1957–1965: McNeese State

Baseball
- 1955: William Carey

Head coaching record
- Overall: 75–32–2 (college football); 6–2 (college baseball); 84–13–2 (junior college football)
- Bowls: 1–0

Accomplishments and honors

Championships
- Football; 4 GSC (1957, 1961, 1963, 1965)

Awards
- Football; 3× GSC Coach of the Year (1957, 1961, 1963)

Leslie Coombs DeVall Jr. (May 2, 1919 – August 27, 2008) was an American football player and coach.

He played college football at the University of Southern Mississippi in 1940 and 1941 as a blocking back.

DeVall began his coaching career as the head football coach at Hinds Community College in Raymond, Mississippi and served as the head coach at William Carey University during the only two years (1954 and 1955) that the school offered football. He also served as William Carey's baseball coach for one season. DeVall was the head football coach at Louisiana College in Alexandria, Louisiana for one season before serving in the same role for nine seasons at McNeese State University.

DeVall died away in 2008.

== Head coaching record ==
=== College football ===
| Year | Team | Overall | Conference | Standing | Bowl/playoffs |
|---|---|---|---|---|---|
William Carey Crusaders () (1954–1955)
| 1954 | William Carey | 5–2 | | | |
| 1955 | William Carey | 6–2 | | | |
| William Carey: | | 11–4 | | | |
Louisiana College Wildcats () (1956)
| 1956 | Louisiana College | 6–4–1 | | | |
| Louisiana College: | | 6–4–1 | | | |
McNeese State Cowboys (Gulf States Conference) (1957–1965)
| 1957 | McNeese State | 8–2 | 4–1 | T–1st | |
| 1958 | McNeese State | 5–5 | 2–3 | T–4th | |
| 1959 | McNeese State | 6–3 | 2–3 | T–3rd | |
| 1960 | McNeese State | 7–3 | 3–2 | T–3rd | |
| 1961 | McNeese State | 7–2 | 4–1 | T–1st | |
| 1962 | McNeese State | 6–2–1 | 3–2 | 2nd | W Golden Isles Bowl |
| 1963 | McNeese State | 8–0 | 5–0 | 1st | |
| 1964 | McNeese State | 6–3 | 3–2 | 3rd | |
| 1965 | McNeese State | 5–4 | 4–1 | T–1st | |
| McNeese State: | | 58–24–1 | 30–15 | | |
| Total: | | 75–32–2 | | | |
National championship Conference title Conference division title or championship game berth
