= 1961 Louisiana Tech Bulldogs football team =

American college football season

1961 Louisiana Tech Bulldogs football
- Conference: Gulf States Conference
- Record: 5–4 (3–2 GSC)
- Head coach: Joe Aillet (21st season)
- Captains: Jack Lestage; Don Tippit; Hershel Vinyard
- Home stadium: Tech Stadium

1961 Gulf States Conference football standings
	Conf.					Overall
Team	W		L		T	W		L		T
No. 7 Southeastern Louisiana +	4	–	1	–	0	9	–	1	–	0
No. 10 McNeese State +	4	–	1	–	0	7	–	2	–	0
Northwestern State	3	–	2	–	0	7	–	3	–	0
Louisiana Tech	3	–	2	–	0	5	–	4	–	0
Northeast Louisiana State	1	–	4	–	0	3	–	7	–	0
Southwestern Louisiana	0	–	5	–	0	2	–	8	–	0
+ – Conference co-champions; Rankings from NAIA poll

The 1961 Louisiana Tech Bulldogs football team was an American football team that represented the Louisiana Polytechnic Institute (now known as Louisiana Tech University) as a member of the Gulf States Conference (GSC) during the 1961 college football season. In their twenty-first year under head coach Joe Aillet, the team compiled a 5–4 record (3–2 in conference games) and outscored opponents by a total of 156 to 109.

The team played its home games at Tech Stadium in Ruston, Louisiana.

== Schedule ==
Date	Opponent	Site	Result	Attendance	Source
September 23	Arkansas State*	Tech Stadium; Ruston, LA	W 47–8	6,500–7,500	
September 30	at McNeese State	Wildcat Stadium; Lake Charles, LA	W 21–16	7,500–8,000	
October 7	Southwestern Louisiana	Tech Stadium; Ruston, LA (rivalry)	W 12–0	7,500	
October 14	at Arlington State*	Memorial Stadium; Arlington, TX	L 7–8	5,000–7,000	
October 21	vs. Northwestern State	State Fair Stadium; Shreveport, LA (rivalry)	L 7–19	22,000–27,000	
October 28	at Tennessee Tech*	Overall Field; Cookeville, TN	W 21–10	6,500	
November 4	at No. 3 Southeastern Louisiana	Strawberry Stadium; Hammond, LA	L 14–34	6,000–8,500	
November 11	Mississippi Southern*	Tech Stadium; Ruston, LA (rivalry)	L 0–7	4,500	
November 18	Northeast Louisiana State	Tech Stadium; Ruston, LA (rivalry)	W 27–7	7,000–7,500	
*Non-conference game; Rankings from AP Poll released prior to the game

== Statistics ==
The Bulldogs gained 2,272 yards of total offense (252 per game), consisting of 1,143 rushing yards (127 per game) and 1,129 passing yards (129 per game). On defense, they allowed opponents to gain 1,806 yards (200 per game) with 1,186 rushing yards (131 per game) and 620 passing yard 68.8 per game).

Quarterback Mickey Slaughter completed 82 of 127 passes (64.6%) for 856 yards with six touchdowns and four interceptions. He also led the team with 829 yards of total offense (diminished by negative 27 rushing yads).

End Jerry Griffin was the leading receiver with 45 catches for 435 yards. The team's rushing leaders were halfbacks Jack Lestage and Andy Farless, both with 213 yards on 57 carries.

Bud Alexander led the team in scoring with 28 points on 19 extra points and three field goals. David Lee was the punter, averaging 40.1 yards on 49 punts.

== Awards and honors ==
Five Louisiana Tech players received honors on the 1961 All-Gulf States Conference football teams selected by the coaches and writers. The honorees were: end Jerry Griffin (writers-1; coaches-1); tackle Herschel Vinyard (writers-1; coaches-1); center John Williamson (writers-2; coaches-2); quarterback Mickey Slaughter (writers-2; coaches-2); and guard Don Tippit (writers-3; coaches-3).
