= Ernest Johnson (American football) =

American football coach (1921–1985)

Biographical details
- Born: November 19, 1921; Elk County, Pennsylvania, U.S.
- Died: December 9, 1985 (aged 64); Lakeland, Florida, U.S.
- Education: Clarion (1947)

Coaching career (HC unless noted)
- 1947–1956: Beaver Falls HS (PA)
- 1957–1962: Clarion

Head coaching record
- Overall: 23–23–3 (college)

Ernest William Johnson Jr. (November 19, 1921 – December 9, 1985) was an American football coach. He served as the head football coach at Clarion University of Pennsylvania from 1957 to 1962, compiling a record of 23–23–3.

== Head coaching record ==
=== College ===
Year	Team	Overall	Conference	Standing	Bowl/playoffs
Clarion Golden Eagles (Pennsylvania State Teachers College Conference / Pennsylvania State College Conference) (1957–1962)
1957	Clarion	2–6	1–4	13th	
1958	Clarion	3–6	2–4	10th	
1959	Clarion	6–1–1	4–1–1	4th	
1960	Clarion	3–4–1	2–4–1	4th (West)	
1961	Clarion	5–2–1	4–1–1	T–2nd (West)	
1962	Clarion	4–4	3–3	T–4th (West)	
Clarion:		23–23–3	16–17–3		
Total:		23–23–3			
