= 1961 Southeastern Louisiana Lions football team =

American college football season

1961 Southeastern Louisiana Lions football

GSC co-champion
- Conference: Gulf States Conference

Ranking
- Coaches: No. 4 (UPI small college)
- AP: No. 8 (AP small college)
- Record: 9–1 (4–1 GSC)
- Head coach: Stan Galloway (11th season)
- Home stadium: Strawberry Stadium

1961 Gulf States Conference football standings
	Conf.					Overall
Team	W		L		T	W		L		T
No. 7 Southeastern Louisiana +	4	–	1	–	0	9	–	1	–	0
No. 10 McNeese State +	4	–	1	–	0	7	–	2	–	0
Northwestern State	3	–	2	–	0	7	–	3	–	0
Louisiana Tech	3	–	2	–	0	5	–	4	–	0
Northeast Louisiana State	1	–	4	–	0	3	–	7	–	0
Southwestern Louisiana	0	–	5	–	0	2	–	8	–	0
+ – Conference co-champions; Rankings from NAIA poll

The 1961 Southeastern Louisiana Lions football team was an American football team that represented Southeastern Louisiana University as a member of the Gulf States Conference (GSC) during the 1961 college football season. In their 11th year under head coach Stan Galloway, the Lions compiled a 9–1 record (4–1 in conference games), tied for the GSC championship, and outscored opponents by a total of 221 to 55. They were ranked No. 4 in the final United Press International coaches small college poll and No. 8 in the final Associated Press writers small college poll.

The team tallied 2,954 yards of total offense (295.4 yards per game), consisting of 2,339 rushing yards and 615 passing yards. On defense, the team gave up 1,860 yards (186.0 yards per game).

The team's leading rushers were halfbacks Wilbur Derrick (581 yards on 116 carries) and Billy Ladner (502 yards on 95 carries). Ladner led the team with 66 points scored on 10 touchdowns and six extra points kicks. Quarterback Elbert Harris led the team with 592 yards of total offense, including 406 passing yards (20 of 49 passes completed with five touchdowns and one interception).

Billy Ladner was selected as the GSC outstanding back of 1961. He had the two longest scoring plays in the GSC during the 1961 season: a 98-yard interception return against Florence State and a 95-yard kickoff return against Louisiana Tech.

Four Southeastern Louisiana players received first-team honors on the 1961 All-Gulf State Conference football teams selected by the coaches and writers. The honorees were: halfback Billy Ladner (coaches and writers); tackle Paul Alexander (coaches and writers); guard Sam Gourieer (coaches); and center Billy Johnson (coaches and writers). Others received second-team honors: end Monty Crook (coaches and writers); and halfback Wilbur Derrick (coaches and writers).

Southeastern Louisiana played its home games at Strawberry Stadium in Hammond, Louisiana.

== Schedule ==
Date	Opponent	Rank	Site	Result	Attendance	Source
September 16	Southwestern Louisiana		Strawberry Stadium; Hammond, LA (Cypress Mug)	W 27–0	8,500	
September 23	at East Texas State*		Memorial Stadium; Commerce, TX	W 20–6	4,000	
September 29	Corpus Christi*		Strawberry Stadium; Hammond, LA	W 39–0	5,000	
October 6	Pensacola NAS*		Strawberry Stadium; Hammond, LA	W 7–5	5,000	
October 14	at Florence State*		Municipal Stadium; Florence, AL	W 33–6	6,000	
October 21	at Northeast Louisiana State	No. 3	Brown Stadium; Monroe, LA	W 7–0	3,000–4,250	
October 28	Tampa*	No. 4	Strawberry Stadium; Hammond, LA	W 27–3	6,500–8,000	
November 4	Louisiana Tech	No. 3	Strawberry Stadium; Hammond, LA	W 34–14	6,000–8,500	
November 11	at McNeese State	No. 3	Wildcat Stadium; Lake Charles, LA	L 8–21	7,400	
November 18	Northwestern State	No. 9	Strawberry Stadium; Hammond, LA (rivalry)	W 19–0	6,500	
*Non-conference game; Rankings from AP Poll released prior to the game
