= 1961 McNeese State Cowboys football team =

American college football season

1961 McNeese State Cowboys football

GSC co-champion
- Conference: Gulf States Conference
- Record: 7–2 (4–1 GSC)
- Head coach: Les DeVall (5th season)
- Home stadium: Wildcat Stadium

1961 Gulf States Conference football standings
	Conf.					Overall
Team	W		L		T	W		L		T
No. 7 Southeastern Louisiana +	4	–	1	–	0	9	–	1	–	0
No. 10 McNeese State +	4	–	1	–	0	7	–	2	–	0
Northwestern State	3	–	2	–	0	7	–	3	–	0
Louisiana Tech	3	–	2	–	0	5	–	4	–	0
Northeast Louisiana State	1	–	4	–	0	3	–	7	–	0
Southwestern Louisiana	0	–	5	–	0	2	–	8	–	0
+ – Conference co-champions; Rankings from NAIA poll

The 1961 McNeese State Cowboys football team was an American football team that represented McNeese State College (now known as McNeese State University) as a member of the Gulf States Conference (GSC) during the 1961 college football season. In their fifth year under head coach Les DeVall, the team compiled a 7–2 (4–1 in conference games), tied for the GSC championship, and outscored opponents by a total of 207 to 85.

The team played its home games at Wildcat Stadium in Lake Charles, Louisiana.

== Schedule ==
Date	Opponent	Site	Result	Attendance	Source
September 16	Pensacola NAS*	Wildcat Stadium; Lake Charles, LA	W 24–6	6,000	
September 30	Louisiana Tech	Wildcat Stadium; Lake Charles, LA	L 16–21	7,500–8,000	
October 7	Arlington State*	Wildcat Stadium; Lake Charles, LA	L 19–22	5,500	
October 14	at Northeast Louisiana State	Brown Stadium; Monroe, LA	W 7–0	4,500–4,800	
October 21	at Instituto Politécnico Nacional*	Estadio Olímpico Universitario; Mexico City, Mexico	W 60–8	30,000	
October 28	at Louisiana College*	Alumni Stadium; Pineville, LA	W 7–6	6,000	
November 4	at Northwestern State	Demon Stadium; Natchitoches, LA (rivalry)	W 28–14	7,000	
November 11	No. 3 Southeastern Louisiana	Wildcat Stadium; Lake Charles, LA	W 21–8	7,400	
November 18	at Southwestern Louisiana	McNaspy Stadium; Lafayette, LA (rivalry)	W 25–0	6,000	
*Non-conference game; Rankings from AP Poll released prior to the game

== Statistics ==
The Cowboys gained 2,666 yards of total offense (296.2 per game) consisting of 1,476 rushing yards (164.0 per game) and 1,190 passing yards (132.2 per game). On defense, they allowed opponents to gain 1,836 yards (204.1 per game), including 1,085 rushing yards (120.6 per game) and 752 passing yards (83.6 per game).

Senior quarterbacks Don Breaux and Nolan Viator led the offense. Breaux completed 55 of 103 passes for 713 yards with nine touchdowns and four interceptions. He also led the team with 724 yards of total offense. Viator completed 25 of 56 passes for 410 yards with four touchdowns and one interceptions. He also tallied 195 passing yards and ranked second on the team with 605 yards of total offense.

Fullback Don Bossier led the team with 499 rushing yards on 116 carries. He also led the team in scoring with 36 points on six touchdowns.

Halfback Lloyd Guillot ranked second in rushing with 248 yards on 46 carries, an average of 5.4 yards per carry.

End Jay Hebert set two school receiving records with 19 receptions and 292 yards. Halfback Charles Stevenson (15 receptions, 207 yards).

== Awards and honors ==
Guard Johnny Steed received the "outstanding lineman" award in the Gulf Coast Conference, and Les DeVall was selected as the coach of the year. Four McNeese players were selected to the first team of the 1961 All-Gulf States Conference football team: quarterback Don Breaux; back Don Bossler; end Tom Sestak; and guard Johnny Steed. Two others were named to the second team: end Jay Hebert; and tackle Julius Fincke.
