= 1961 Southwestern Louisiana Bulldogs football team =

American college football season

1961 Southwestern Louisiana Bulldogs football
- Conference: Gulf States Conference
- Record: 2–8 (0–5 GSC)
- Head coach: Russ Faulkinberry (1st season)
- Home stadium: McNaspy Stadium

1961 Gulf States Conference football standings
	Conf.					Overall
Team	W		L		T	W		L		T
No. 7 Southeastern Louisiana +	4	–	1	–	0	9	–	1	–	0
No. 10 McNeese State +	4	–	1	–	0	7	–	2	–	0
Northwestern State	3	–	2	–	0	7	–	3	–	0
Louisiana Tech	3	–	2	–	0	5	–	4	–	0
Northeast Louisiana State	1	–	4	–	0	3	–	7	–	0
Southwestern Louisiana	0	–	5	–	0	2	–	8	–	0
+ – Conference co-champions; Rankings from NAIA poll

The 1961 Southwestern Louisiana Bulldogs football team was an American football team that represented the University of Southwestern Louisiana (now known as the University of Louisiana at Lafayette) in the Gulf States Conference (GSC) during the 1961 college football season. In their first year under head coach Russ Faulkinberry, the Bulldogs compiled a 2–8 record (0–5 in conference games), finished in last pace in the GSC, and were outscored by a total of 194 to 99

The team's statistical leaders included quarterback Olie Cordill (466 passing yards, 582 yards total offense), fullback Carlton Falgout (430 rushing yards, 81 carries), and end Bob Verlander (13 receptions, 206 yards, 18 points).

The team played its home games at McNaspy Stadium in Lafayette, Louisiana.

== Schedule ==
Date	Opponent	Site	Result	Attendance	Source
September 16	at Southeastern Louisiana	Strawberry Stadium; Hammond, LA (rivalry)	L 0–27	8,500	
September 23	at Arlington State*	Memorial Stadium; Arlington, TX	L 0–26	5,000–8,000	
September 30	Mississippi Southern*	McNaspy Stadium; Lafayette, LA	L 6–22	5,500	
October 7	at Louisiana Tech	Tech Stadium; Ruston, LA (rivalry)	L 0–12	7,000	
October 21	Louisiana College*	McNaspy Stadium; Lafayette, LA	L 9–14		
October 28	vs. Northeast Louisiana State	State Fair Stadium; Shreveport, LA (rivalry)	L 20–27	4,000	
November 4	at Pensacola NAS*	NAS Stadium; Pensacola, FL	W 9–7	4,000	
November 11	Northwestern State	McNaspy Stadium; Lafayette, LA	L 14–27	6,000–6,500	
November 18	McNeese State	McNaspy Stadium; Lafayette, LA (rivalry)	L 0–25	6,500	
November 25	Henderson State*	McNaspy Stadium; Lafayette, LA	W 41–7	2,500	
*Non-conference game

== Statistics ==
The Bulldogs gained 2,010 yards of total offense (201.0 per game) consisting of 1,368 rushing yards (136.8 per game) and 642 passing yards (64.2 per game). On defense, they allowed opponents to gain 3,362 yards (336.2 per game), including 2,514 rushing yards (251.4 per game) and 788 passing yards (78.8 per game).

Quarterback Olie Cordill completed 45 of 122 passes (36.9%) for 466 yards with five touchdowns and six interceptions. He also gained 115 rushing yards and led the team with 582 yards of total offense. Cordill also led the team in punting with an average of 39.1 yard on 27 punts.

Left end Bob Verlander led the team in receiving and scoring. He had 13 receptions for 206 yards and scored 18 points on three touchdowns.

Fullback Carlton Falgoutt led the team in rushing with 430 yards on 81 carries for an average of 5.3 yards per carry.

== Awards and honors ==
Three Southwestern Louisiana players received recognition from the coaches or writers on the 1961 All-Gulf States Conference football teams:

- Carlton Falgout was recognized by the coaches as the first-team fullback; he was recognized by the writers as a second-team back and a third-team tackle.
- Cliff O'Neal was recognized by the coaches as a second-team end.
- Bob Verlander was recognized by the writers as a third-team end.
