= Bob Waldorf =

American football player and coach (1918–1996)

Biographical details
- Born: August 29, 1918
- Died: February 5, 1996 (aged 77)
- Education: George Washington (1971 Ed.D.)

Playing career
- 1936–1939: Missouri
- Position: Guard

Coaching career (HC unless noted)
- 1940–1941: Simpson (IA)
- 1946–1952: Battle Creek Central HS (MI)
- 1953–1956: Washington-Lee HS (VA)
- 1957–1964: Western Maryland

Administrative career (AD unless noted)
- 1957–1965: Western Maryland

Head coaching record
- Overall: 44–38–6 (college); 63–34–4 (high school)

Accomplishments and honors

Championships
- 4 Mason–Dixon (1960–1963); 1 MAC Southern College Division (1963)

Awards
- Second-team All-American (1939); First-team All-Big Six (1939)

Robert J. Waldorf (August 29, 1918 – February 5, 1996) was an American football player and coach. He served as the head football coach at Simpson College in Indianola, Iowa from 1940 to 1941 and at Western Maryland College–now known as McDaniel College–from 1957 to 1964, compiling a career college football coaching record of 44–38–6. In between his stints at Simpson and Western Maryland, Waldorf coached in the high school football ranks, at Battle Creek Central High School in Battle Creek, Michigan from 1946 to 1952 and Washington-Lee High School in Arlington, Virginia from 1953 to 1956.

Waldorf played college football at the University of Missouri, where he was a member of the 1939 College Football All-America Team as a guard.

== Head coaching record ==
=== College ===
Year	Team	Overall	Conference	Standing	Bowl/playoffs
Simpson Redmen (Iowa Conference) (1940–1941)
1940	Simpson	1–7–1	1–4–1	11th	
1941	Simpson	3–5–1	1–4	10th	
Simpson:		4–12–2	2–8–1		
Western Maryland Green Terror (Mason–Dixon Conference) (1957)
1957	Western Maryland	1–6–1	0–2–1	5th	
Western Maryland Green Terror (Middle Atlantic Conference / Mason–Dixon Conference) (1958–1964)
1958	Western Maryland	3–6	1–4 / 2–2	T–4th (Southern College) / 3rd	
1959	Western Maryland	5–2–2	3–2–1 / 2–1–1	3rd (Southern College) / T–2nd	
1960	Western Maryland	6–3	3–2 / 3–1	3rd (Southern College) / T–1st	
1961	Western Maryland	7–2	4–2 / 4–0	T–2nd (Southern College) / 1st	
1962	Western Maryland	8–1	5–1 / 4–0	T–1st (Southern College) / 1st	
1963	Western Maryland	6–1–1	4–0 / 2–0–1	1st (Southern College) / 1st	
1964	Western Maryland	4–5	2–4 / 2–1	T–8th (Southern College) / 2nd	
Western Maryland:		40–26–4			
Total:		44–38–6			
National championship Conference title Conference division title or championship game berth
