= 1961 small college football rankings =

- Selectors: AP, NAIA, UPI
- No. 1: Pittsburg State
- Small college football rankings (AP, UPI)
- «1960 1962»

The 1961 small college football rankings are rankings of college football teams representing smaller college and university teams during the 1961 college football season. Separate rankings were published by the Associated Press (AP) and the United Press International (UPI). The AP rankings were selected by a board of experts, and the UPI rankings were selected by a board of small-college coaches from throughout the country.

In its final rankings, the AP selected the 1961 Pittsburg State Gorillas football team as the small-college national champion. The Gorillas finished the season with a perfect 11–0 record, shut out seven opponents, and defeated Linfield in the Camellia Bowl. For its second through fifth spots, the AP selected four other undefeated teams: Baldwin–Wallace (9–0); Fresno State (10–0); Florida A&M (10–0); and Whittier (8–0).

The UPI board of coaches also selected Pittsburg as the small-college champion with first-place votes from 14 of the participating coaches and 250 total points. The UPI rated Baldwin–Wallace second, Mississippi Southern (8–2) third, and Southeastern Louisiana (9–1) fourth.

The National Association of Intercollegiate Athletics (NAIA) also conducted a poll of coaches at the end of the 1961 regular season. Pittsburg was selected as the national champion in the NAIA poll.

== Legend ==
	Increase in ranking
	Decrease in ranking
	Not ranked previous week
(#–#)	Win–loss record
(Italics)	Number of first place votes
т	Tied with team above or below also with this symbol

== AP poll ==
	Week 1 Oct 5	Week 2 Oct 12	Week 3 Oct 19	Week 4 Oct 26	Week 5 Nov 2	Week 6 Nov 9	Week 7 Nov 16	Week 8 Nov 23	
1.	Texas A&I	Texas A&I (3–0) (5)	Pittsburg State (5–0) (3)	Pittsburg State (6–0) (4)	Pittsburg State (7–0) (6)	Pittsburg State (8–0) (3)	Pittsburg State (9–0) (5)	Pittsburg State (9–0) (5)	1.
2.	Hillsdale (1)	Humboldt State (3–0) (2)	Baldwin–Wallace (4–0)	Northern Michigan (5–1)	Baldwin–Wallace (5–0)	Baldwin–Wallace (6–0) (1)	Baldwin–Wallace (8–0)	Baldwin–Wallace (9–0)	2.
3.	Southeastern Louisiana (1)	Southeastern Louisiana (4–0) (1)	Southeastern Louisiana (4–0)	Baldwin–Wallace (4–0) (2)	Southeastern Louisiana (7–0)	Southeastern Louisiana (8–0) (2)	Fresno State (8–0)	Fresno State (9–0)	3.
4.	Southern Illinois	Pittsburg State (4–0)	Northern Michigan (4–1) (1)	Southeastern Louisiana (6–0)	Northern Michigan (5–1)	Northern Michigan (6–1)	Whittier (8–0)	Florida A&M (8–0)	4.
5.	Humboldt State	Southern Illinois	Whittier (5–0)	Whittier	Whittier	Fresno State (7–0)	Florida A&M (7–0)	Whittier (9–0)	5.
6.	Mississippi Southern	Northern Michigan (3–1)	Hofstra (3–0)	Fresno State (5–0)	Fresno State (6–0)	Florida A&M (6–0)	Lehigh (6–2)	Lehigh (7–2)	6.
7.	Pittsburg State	Baldwin–Wallace (3–0)	Texas A&I (3–1) (1)	Hofstra (4–0) т	Florida A&M (5–0)	Whittier (7–0)	Lenoir–Rhyne (7–1–1) (1)	Linfield (9–0) (1)	7.
8.	Northern Michigan	Delaware (3–0)	Lamar Tech (4–0)	Northwestern State (6–0) (1) т (Note: In the actual printed polls, Northwestern State was listed as Northwestern Louisiana)	Mississippi Southern (5–1)	Lehigh	Linfield (8–0) (1)	Southeastern Louisiana (9–1)	8.
9.	Lehigh (1)	Whittier (4–0) (1)	West Chester (4–0) (1)	West Chester	Lenoir–Rhyne	Linfield (7–0) (1)	Southeastern Louisiana (8–1)	Lenoir–Rhyne (7–1–1) (1)	9.
10.	Newberry (1) т	West Chester (3–0) (1)	Fresno State (5–0)	Mississippi Southern (5–1)	Lamar Tech (1) т	Lenoir–Rhyne (6–1–1) (1)	Amherst (9–0) (1)	Butler (9–0) т	10.
11.	Southern (1) т				Linfield т			Mississippi Southern (7–2) т	11.
	Week 1 Oct 5	Week 2 Oct 12	Week 3 Oct 19	Week 4 Oct 26	Week 5 Nov 2	Week 6 Nov 9	Week 7 Nov 16	Week 8 Nov 23	
		Dropped: 2 Hillsdale; 6 Mississippi Southern; 9 Lehigh; 10 Newberry; 11 Southern	Dropped: 2 Humboldt State; 5 Southern Illinois; 8 Delaware	Dropped: 7 Texas A&I; 8 Lamar Tech	Dropped: 7 Hofstra; 8 Northwestern State; 9 West Chester	Dropped: 8 Mississippi Southern; 10 Lamar Tech	Dropped: 4 Northern Michigan	Dropped: 10 Amherst	

== UPI coaches poll ==
	Week 1 Oct 4	Week 2 Oct 11	Week 3 Oct 18	Week 4 Oct 25	Week 5 Nov 1	Week 6 Nov 8	Week 7 Nov 15	Week 8 Nov 22	
1.	Mississippi Southern (7)	Mississippi Southern (3–0)	Northern Michigan (4–1) (5)	Northern Michigan (5–1) (14)	Mississippi Southern (5–1) (14)	Pittsburg State (8–0) (9)	Pittsburg State (9–0) (13)	Pittsburg State (9–0) (14)	1.
2.	Hillsdale (7) т	Northern Michigan (3–1)	Mississippi Southern (3–1) (9)	Mississippi Southern (4–1) (10)	Pittsburg State (7–0) (3)	Northern Michigan (6–1) (4)	Baldwin–Wallace (8–0) (3)	Baldwin–Wallace (9–0) (1)	2.
3.	Kent State (2) т	Louisiana Tech (3–0)	Louisiana Tech (3–1) (2)	Pittsburg State (6–0) (3)	Northern Michigan (5–1) (3)	Southeastern Louisiana (8–0) (8)	Mississippi Southern (6–2) (5)	Mississippi Southern (7–2) (4)	3.
4.	Humboldt State (4) т	Texas A&I (3–0)	Texas A&I (3–1) (1)	Southeastern Louisiana (6–0) (1)	Southeastern Louisiana (7–0) (5)	Mississippi Southern (5–2) (6)	Southeastern Louisiana (8–1) (4)	Southeastern Louisiana (9–1)	4.
5.	Louisiana Tech (2) т	Delaware (3–0)	Fresno State (4–0) (3)	Fresno State (5–0) (1)	Fresno State (6–0) (2)	Baldwin–Wallace (6–0) (1)	Fresno State (8–0) (5)	Fresno State (9–0) (8)	5.
6.	Northern Michigan	Humboldt State (3–0)	Southeastern Louisiana (5–0) (2)	Baldwin–Wallace (4–0) (3)	Baldwin–Wallace (5–0) (2)	Fresno State (7–0) (4)	Florida A&M (7–0) (1)	Florida A&M (8–0)	6.
7.	Texas A&I (3)	Fresno State (3–0)	Pittsburg State (5–0) (3)	Hofstra (4–0) (1)	Idaho State (5–0) (2)	Wheaton (IL) (8–0)	Northern Michigan (6–2) (1)	Wheaton (IL) (8–0)	7.
8.	Delaware (1)	Pittsburg State (4–0)	Hofstra (3–0) (2)	Louisiana Tech (3–2)	Wheaton (IL) (7–0)	Florida A&M (6–0) (1)	Wheaton (IL) (8–0)	Whittier (9–0)	8.
9.	Arkansas State (3)	Southeastern Louisiana (4–0)	Humboldt State (3–1)	Wheaton (IL) (6–0) (1)	Florida A&M (5–0) (1)	Idaho State (5–1)	Butler (8–0)	Butler (9–0)	9.
10.	Chattanooga (1) т	Kent State (2–2)	Baldwin–Wallace (3–0) (1)	Idaho State (4–0)	West Chester (5–1)	Butler (7–0)	Whittier (8–0)	Northern Michigan (6–2)	10.
11.	Pittsburg State (1) т	Baldwin–Wallace	Idaho State (1)	Texas A&I	Butler	Lehigh (1)	Idaho State	Lehigh (7–2) т	11.
12.	Fresno State (1)	Arkansas State	Wheaton (IL) (1)	West Chester	Louisiana Tech	Delaware т	Central State (OK)	Linfield (9–0) т	12.
13.	Lenoir–Rhyne	Hillsdale т	Kent State	Butler	Texas A&I	Lenoir–Rhyne (6–1–1) т	Linfield (8–0)	Idaho State	13.
14.	Louisville (1)	Southern Illinois т	Butler	Humboldt State	Whittier	Northwestern State	Amherst (7–0) т	Central State (OK)	14.
15.	Southeastern Louisiana (1)	Idaho State	Florida A&M	Northwestern State (6–0) (1)	Humboldt State	Amherst	Lehigh (6–2) т	Northern State	15.
16.	Lamar Tech	Lenoir–Rhyne	Hillsdale (1)	Florida A&M	Northwestern State	Humboldt State	Tampa	Humboldt State т	16.
17.	Baldwin–Wallace т	Louisville	Lamar Tech (4–0) (2)	Lamar Tech	Lenoir–Rhyne	Whittier (7–0)	Humboldt State т	Lenoir–Rhyne (7–1–1) т	17.
18.	Butler т	Wheaton (IL)	Lenoir–Rhyne	Montana State	Lamar Tech	Texas A&I	Lenoir–Rhyne (7–1–1) т	Tampa	18.
19.	East Texas State т	Butler т	Lehigh	Albright (4–0) т	Southern Illinois	Northern State (7–0)	Louisiana Tech	Chattanooga	19.
20.	Florida A&M т	Lehigh т	Montana State	Lenoir–Rhyne т	Hofstra	Central State (OK) т	Southern Illinois	Ottawa	20.
21.	Idaho State т					Chattanooga т			21.
	Week 1 Oct 4	Week 2 Oct 11	Week 3 Oct 18	Week 4 Oct 25	Week 5 Nov 1	Week 6 Nov 8	Week 7 Nov 15	Week 8 Nov 22	
		Dropped: 10 Chattanooga; 16 Lamar Tech; 19 East Texas State; 20 Florida A&M	Dropped: 5 Delaware; 12 Arkansas State; 14 Southern Illinois; 17 Louisville	Dropped: 13 Kent State; 16 Hillsdale; 19 Lehigh	Dropped: 18 Montana State; 19 Albright	Dropped: 10 West Chester; 12 Louisiana Tech; 18 Lamar Tech; 19 Southern Illinois; 20 Hofstra	Dropped: 12 Delaware; 14 Northwestern State; 18 Texas A&I; 19 Northern State; 20 Chattanooga	Dropped: 14 Amherst; 19 Louisiana Tech; 20 Southern Illinois	

== NAIA coaches poll ==
The National Association of Intercollegiate Athletics (NAIA) also conducted a poll of coaches at the end of the 1961 regular season. The NAIA coaches poll ranked the top 20 teams, as presented in the below table. Four teams advanced to the postseason, with Pittsburg winning the bracket tournament.

1. Pittsburg State†
2. Baldwin–Wallace
3. Linfield †
4. Whittier †
5. Florida A&M
6. Northern State †
7. Southeastern Louisiana
8. Tampa
9. Central State (OK)
10. McNeese State
11. Panhandle A&M
12. Parsons
13. Humboldt State
14. Millikin
15. Lenoir Rhyne
16. Ottawa (KS)
17. Arkansas Tech
18. Minnesota–Duluth
19. Missouri Valley
20. West Chester

† Team participated in the NAIA postseason

== Pittsburgh Courier rankings ==
The Pittsburgh Courier, a leading African American newspaper, ranked the top 1961 teams from historically black colleges and universities in an era when college football was often racially segregated.

The rankings were published on December 2:

- 1. Florida A&M (10–0)
- 2. Jackson State (9–1)
- 3. North Carolina College (7–0–2)
- 4. Grambling (8–2)
- 5. Southern (7–3)
- 6. Texas Southern (6–3)
- 7. North Carolina A&T (5–4)
- 8. Winston-Salem State (6–1–1)
- 9. Johnson C. Smith (8–1)
- 10. Morris Brown (6–4)
- 11. Maryland State (4–2–1)
- 12. Prairie View A&M (5–4–1)
- 13. Tennessee A&I (4–4–1)
- 14. Central State (7–1)
- 15. Alabama A&M (7–1)
