= Upsala College =

Private college in East Orange, New Jersey, US (1893–1995)

- Motto: Vincit omnia veritas
- Motto in English: Truth Conquers All
- Type: Private liberal arts college
- Active: 1893–May 31, 1995
- Affiliations: Evangelical Lutheran Church in America
- Location: East Orange, New Jersey, United States; 40.776064°N 74.208146°W
- Campus: Urban
- Nickname: Vikings

Upsala College (UC) was a private college affiliated with the Swedish-American Augustana Synod (later the Evangelical Lutheran Church in America) and located in East Orange in Essex County, New Jersey, United States, with an additional campus in Wantage Township in Sussex County. Upsala was founded in 1893 in Brooklyn, New York City, and moved to Kenilworth, and finally to East Orange in 1924. Despite a turnaround strategy that involved recruiting minority and international students, declining enrollment and financial difficulties forced the school to close in 1995.

== History ==
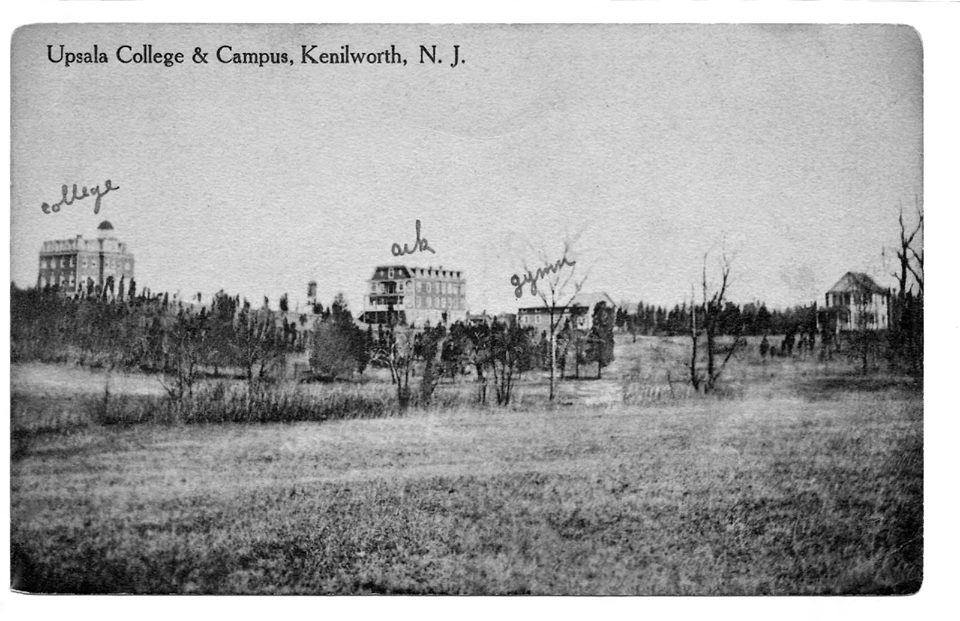
In its early years, Upsala College was invited to build its campus in Kenilworth, New Jersey (seen here, circa 1906) where it operated for 25 years before moving to East Orange in 1924.

Upsala College was founded at the 1893 annual meeting of the Swedish Evangelical Lutheran Augustana Synod in North America, known as the Augustana Synod—a Lutheran church body with roots in the Swedish immigrant community. (Note: The Augustana Synod, which was known by several names over the years (as Augustana Evangelical Lutheran Church, Augustana Lutheran Synod, Scandinavian Evangelical Lutheran Augustana Synod in North America and Swedish Evangelical Lutheran Augustana Synod in North America) was merged into the Lutheran Church in America in 1962, which merged in 1987 with the two other national Lutheran bodies (The American Lutheran Church and Association of Evangelical Lutheran Churches) to in 1988 form the Evangelical Lutheran Church in America (ELCA).) The Augustana Synod placed emphasis on mission, ecumenism, and social service. Meeting at Augustana College in Rock Island, Illinois, the polity decided to open the college in Brooklyn, New York, in October 1893. The Synod chose a young minister, the Rev. Lars Herman Beck (1859–1935), as the college's first president. Beck, a Swedish immigrant to the United States, had received his Ph.D. from Yale University in the previous year and turned down a teaching position at Yale to assume the post at Upsala.

The name Upsala was chosen to honor both the historic Uppsala University in Sweden and the Meeting of Uppsala. (Note: Upsala is an historical variant spelling of Uppsala. The modern spelling featuring two p's replaced this historical spelling in the early of the twentieth century.) That 1593 meeting—exactly 300 years before the founding of Upsala College—firmly established Lutheran Orthodoxy in Sweden after the attempts by King John III to reintroduce Roman Catholic liturgy.

On October 3, 1893, Upsala College opened in the Swedish Evangelical Lutheran Bethlehem Church in Brooklyn. The first day, Beck began instruction with 16 students. By the end of the year, Upsala had 75 students. Early instruction had been in Swedish as the student body largely consisted of Scandinavian immigrants. In 1897, the college moved to Kenilworth, New Jersey (formerly "New Orange, New Jersey") when the "New Orange Industrial Association" offered the young school fourteen acres of land. Upsala erected its first building on the Kenilworth campus in 1899. The college granted its first Bachelor of Arts (B.A.) degrees in 1905 to four students. By 1910, Upsala offered Bachelor of Arts in modern and classical languages, and Bachelor of Science (B.S.) degrees in Mathematics and Sciences, while offering a three-year college preparatory program, instruction in music for preparing "teachers of music, organist and choir leaders, and in general to afford its students a musical education", instruction in commerce and business to "train young men and women for a business career" and in stenography for students seeking "to fill positions as stenographers and private secretaries." While the college was identified by its connection with the Swedish Lutheran community, Upsala was the first college in New Jersey to admit women, and its student body welcomed students from many other nationalities and religions. In 1908, the student body consisted of "79 Swedes, 2 Finns, 1 Jew, 1 'American', 1 Chinese, 1 Korean, and 1 Persian."

The college moved to East Orange in 1924 after purchasing a 45-acre site in the city in the previous year.

In 1978, Wallace R. Wirths, a former Westinghouse Corporation executive, author, local newspaper columnist and radio commentator, donated a 229-acre tract of land in rural Wantage Township in Sussex County to the college for the construction of a second campus. Upsala did not erect any buildings on the property; the only building was a former barn that Wirths converted to offices and a lecture hall. About 300 students were enrolled at the campus in 1992. When the college closed and its assets were sold, the Wirths family bought back the land from the college for $75,000.

Throughout the 1970s and 1980s, Upsala suffered from severe financial problems and declining enrollment. The demographics of East Orange had changed in the aftermath of the 1967 Newark riots, becoming a city of largely minority residents; this resulted in it gaining a reputation as dangerous, leading to a decline in recruiting prospective students. The student body had decreased from approximately 1,400 students at its peak in 1969, to 475 by 1990.

In the 1980s, the college took out a roughly US$12,000,000 loan at a high interest rate in order to update and maintain its buildings. The college experienced difficulties in refinancing the loan, and it also prevented the college from making "cooperative agreements" with other campuses. A turnaround strategy implemented by then-college president Robert E. Karsten in the early 1990s resulted in the increase of the student body to 882 in 1992. This increase in students was due to the college changing its recruiting efforts to focus on minority and international students. By 1992, 35 percent of the student body was black or African American and 30 percent were international students. A major fundraising effort raised US$1,000,000 in the first six months of 1992, and a consortium of multiple lenders and Lutheran colleges provided the college with a US$4,000,000 loan. In June 1994, the college told employees that it would no longer be able to pay them by the end of the month. The Middle States Association of Colleges and Schools then notified the college that its accreditation would be revoked on December 31, 1994. It instituted cuts in staffing and voted to stay open in July 1994, pending aid from the New Jersey state government. The financial difficulties the college experienced during 1994 caused its enrollment to fall by two thirds, with many students choosing to transfer to other colleges.

The college further cut faculty salaries by 40 percent, and on March 3, 1995, the college's trustees voted to close the college on May 31, 1995. The college had hoped that an infusion of cash from South Korean industrialist In Tae Kim would help it avoid closure, but the college's administration stated that South Korea's ban on exporting funds to nonprofit organizations prevented it from obtaining the money. At the time of the vote, the Middle States Association of Colleges and Schools stated it would revoke the college's accreditation on the same day of its closure. The last class of approximately 200 graduated on May 14, 1995. The number of students was 435 at the time of the college's closure. The college closed with approximately US$12,500,000 in debt and filed for bankruptcy the next month. The school's ninth and last president, Paul V. DeLomba, a partner and project manager with the financial services and accountancy firm Price Waterhouse, was hired by the board of trustees to close the college and dissolve its assets.

After its closure, the college's campus was sold to the East Orange School District, which built a new high school, East Orange Campus High School, on its eastern half. Several of the college's former buildings were incorporated into the new school. During this time, the western half of the campus deteriorated, became blighted and its buildings were looted and vandalized. The western half was slated for redevelopment by the city government in 1997 and demolished in summer 2005; a residential development of single-family homes, Woodlands at Upsala, was built on the site beginning in 2006 by developers The Alpert Group and the Applied Development Company.

Upsala's campus radio station, WFMU, remains in operation; a nonprofit company known as Auricle Communications, formed by station staff in 1992, purchased WFMU's license in 1994, one year before the college closed. WFMU continued to occupy space on the campus until 1998, when it purchased and moved to another building in Jersey City.

Roughly 60 percent of Upsala's library was sold to the newly established Florida Gulf Coast University in Fort Myers, Florida. The university's first classes were held in August 1997. A German investor and nearby Fairleigh Dickinson University bought the remainder of the collection.

Upsala student transcripts can be obtained from Felician University, which is also located in New Jersey. The college records were given to Augustana College.

== See also ==
- List of colleges and universities in New Jersey
- List of Lutheran colleges and universities in the United States
