= 1961 Pennsylvania State College Conference football season =

- Sport: Football
- Teams: 14
- Champion: West Chester

Football seasons
- 1960 1962

1961 Pennsylvania State College Conference football standings
	Conf.					Overall
Team	W		L		T	W		L		T
East Division
No. 20 West Chester xy$	4	–	0	–	0	7	–	2	–	0
East Stroudsburg	5	–	1	–	0	7	–	1	–	0
Bloomsburg	2	–	2	–	0	4	–	4	–	0
Millersville	2	–	3	–	0	5	–	3	–	0
Mansfield	2	–	3	–	0	4	–	4	–	0
Kutztown	2	–	3	–	0	2	–	6	–	0
Cheyney	0	–	5	–	0	0	–	7	–	1
West Division
Slippery Rock xy	4	–	1	–	0	6	–	3	–	0
California (PA)	4	–	1	–	1	5	–	2	–	1
Clarion	3	–	2	–	1	4	–	3	–	1
Lock Haven	2	–	2	–	1	5	–	2	–	2
Edinboro	1	–	3	–	1	3	–	4	–	1
Indiana (PA)	1	–	4	–	0	2	–	7	–	0
Shippensburg	0	–	4	–	0	0	–	8	–	0
Championship: West Chester 21, Slippery Rock 0
$ – Conference champion; x – Division champion/co-champions; y – Championship game participant; Edinboro forfeited to Clarion.; Rankings from NAIA poll

The 1961 Pennsylvania State College Conference football season was the season of college football played by the 14 member schools of the Pennsylvania State College Conference (PSTC) as part of the 1961 college football season.

The 1961 West Chester Golden Rams football team compiled a 7–2 overall record during the regular season (4–0 in PSCC games) and won the East Division championship.

The 1961 Slippery Rock Rockets football team compiled at 6–2 overall record in the regular season (4–1 in PSCC games) and won the West Division title.

In the PSCC championship game, West Chester defeated Slippry Rock, 21–0, to in the PSCC championship.

== East Division ==
=== West Chester ===
1961 West Chester Golden Rams football

PSCC champion PSCC East Division champion

PSCC Championship Game, W 21–0 vs. Slippery Rock
- Conference: Pennsylvania State College Conference
- East Division
- Record: 7–2 (4–0 PSCC)
- Head coach: James Bonder (2nd season)
- Home stadium: Farrell Field

The 1961 West Chester Golden Rams football team represented West Chester State College (now known as West Chester University) of West Chester, Pennsylvania. In their second year under head coach James Bonder, the Golden Rams compiled a 7–2 record (4–0 against PSCC opponents), won the PSCC championship, and outscored opponents by a total of 271 to 107. They were ranked 20th in the final NAIA poll.

West Chester's junior fullback Joe Iacone rushed for 1,059 yards in 1961; he was selected as a first-team player on the 1961 Little All-America college football team.

Date	Opponent	Site	Result	Attendance	Source
September 23	at Ithaca*	South Hill Field; Ithaca, NY	W 13–7	700–3,000	
September 30	at East Stroudsburg	East Stroudsburg, PA	W 28–7	5,500	
October 6	Millersville	West Chester, PA	W 56–6	6,000–7,000	
October 13	Clarion	West Chester, PA	W 51–20	6,000–6,500	
October 21	at Kutztown	Kutztown, PA	W 47–0	500	
October 28	Muskingum*	West Chester, PA	L 16–19	9,000	
November 4	at Villanova*	Villanova Stadium; Villanova, PA	L 13–40	14,500	
November 11	at Bloomsburg	Bloomsburg, PA	W 26–7	4,000	
November 18	Slippery Rock	West Chester, PA (PSCC Championship Game)	W 21–0	5,500	
*Non-conference game

=== East Stroudsburg ===
1961 East Stroudsburg Warriors football
- Conference: Pennsylvania State Teachers College Conference
- Record: 7–1 (5–1 PSTCC)
- Head coach: Jack Gregory (3rd season)

The 1961 East Stroudsburg Warriors football team represented East Stroudsburg State College (now known as East Stroudsburg University of Pennsylvania) of East Stroudsburg, Pennsylvania. In their third year under head coach Jack Gregory, the Warriors compiled a 7–1 record (5–1 against PSCC opponents), finished in second place in the PSCC East Division, and outscored opponents by a total of 288 to 45.

Date	Opponent	Site	Result	Attendance	Source
September 15	Millersville	East Stroudsburg, PA	W 37–7		
September 23	at Kutztown	Kutztown, PA	W 45–0		
September 30	West Chester	East Stroudsburg, PA	L 7–28	5,500	
October 7	at Shippensburg	Shippensburg, PA	W 47–7		
October 14	Mansfield	East Stroudsburg, PA	W 38–3		
October 21	at Cheyney	Cheyney, PA	W 54–0		
October 28	at Bloomsburg	Bloomsburg, PA	W 36–0		
November 4	Cortland*	East Stroudsburg, PA	W 24–0	1,500	
*Non-conference game

=== Bloomsburg ===
1961 Bloomsburg Huskies football
- Conference: Pennsylvania State College Conference
- Record: 4–4 (2–2 PSTCC)
- Head coach: Walter R. Blair (5th season)

The 1961 Bloomsburg Huskies football team represented Bloomsburg State College (now known as Bloomsburg University of Pennsylvania) of Bloomsburg, Pennsylvania. In their fifth year uner head coach Walter R. Blair, the Huskies compiled a 4–4 record (2–3 against PSCC opponents), finished in third place in the East Division of the PSCC, and outscored opponents by a total of 136 to 122.

Date	Opponent	Site	Result	Attendance	Source
September 23	Shippensburg	Bloomsburg, PA	W 34–7		
September 29	King's (PA)*	Bloomsburg, PA	W 31–12		
October 7	at Cortland*	Cortland, NY	L 8–16		
October 14	at Lock Haven	Lock Haven, PA	L 7–18		
October 21	at Mansfield	Mansfield, OH	W 21–7		
October 28	East Stroudsburg^{†}	Bloomsburg, PA	L 0–36		
November 4	at Cheyney	Cheyney, PA	W 28–0		
November 11	West Chester	Bloomsburg, PA	L 7–26	4,000	
*Non-conference game; ^{†}Homecoming

=== Millersville ===
1961 Millersville Marauders football
- Conference: Pennsylvania State College Conference
- Record: 5–3 (2–3 PSCC)
- Head coach: George Katchmer (8th season)

The 1961 Millersville Marauders football team represented Millersville State College (now known as Millersville University of Pennsylvania) of Millersville, Pennsylvania. In their eighth year under head coach George Katchmer, the Marauders compiled a 5–3 record (2–3 against PSCC opponents) and finished in a tie for fourth place in the East Division of the PSCC.

Date	Opponent	Site	Result	Attendance	Source
September 15	at East Stroudsburg	East Stroudsburg, PA	L 7–37		
September 23	Randolph–Macon*	Millersville, PA	W 20–12		
	Kutztown		L 0–7		
October 6	at West Chester	West Chester, PA	L 6–56	6,000	
	Cheyney		W 48–6		
	Trenton State*		W 26–0		
	Mansfield		W 26–6		
November 4	Montclair State*	Millersville, PA	W 31–14	2,000	
*Non-conference game

=== Mansfield ===
1961 Mansfield Mountaineers football
- Conference: Pennsylvania State College Conference
- Record: 4–4 (2–3 PSCC)
- Head coach: Ed Stelmack (7th season)

The 1961 Mansfield Mountaineers football team represented Mansfield State College (now known as Mansfield University of Pennsylvania) of Mansfield, Pennsylvania. In their seventh and final year under head coach Ed Stelmack, the Mountaineers compiled a 4–4 record (2–3 against PSCC opponents) and finished in a tie for fourth place in the East Division of the PSCC.

Date	Opponent	Site	Result	Attendance	Source
	Cheyney		W 60–13		
September 30	at Shippensburg	Shippensburg, PA	W 26–21		
	Brockport*		W 21–0		
October 14	at East Stroudsburg	East Stroudsburg, PA	L 3–38		
October 21	Bloomsburg	Mansfield, OH	L 7–21		
	Millersville		L 6–26		
	Kutztown		W 20–0		
	at Lock Haven	Lock Haven, PA	L 19–43		
*Non-conference game

=== Kutztown ===
1961 Kutztown Golden Bears football
- Conference: Pennsylvania State College Conference
- Record: 2–6 (2–3 PSCC)
- Head coach: Bud Heilman (2nd season)

The 1961 Kutztown Golden Bears football team represented Kutztown State College (now known as Kutztown University of Pennsylvania) of Kutztown, Pennsylvania. In their second year under head coach Bud Heilman, the Golden Bears compiled a 2–6 record (2–3 against PSCC opponents) and finished in a tie for fourth place in the East Division of the PSCC.

Date	Opponent	Site	Result	Attendance	Source
September 23	East Stroudsburg	Kutztown, PA	L 0–45		
	Cheyney		W 25–0		
October 14	at Delaware Valley*	Alumni Field; Doylestown, PA	L 6–12	1,500	
October 21	West Chester	Kutztown, PA	L 0–47	500	
October 28	at Montclair State*	Clifton High School Stadium; Clinton, NJ	L 6–20		
	Central Connecticut State*		L 7–20		
	Millersville		W 7–0		
	Mansfield		L 0–20		
*Non-conference game

=== Cheyney ===
1961 Cheyney Wolves football
- Conference: Pennsylvania State College Conference
- Record: 0–7–1 (0–5 PSCC)
- Head coach: James Stevenson (4th season)

The 1961 Cheyney Wolves football team represented Cheyney State College (now known as Cheyney University of Pennsylvania) of Cheyney, Pennsylvania. In their fourth year under head coach James Stevenson, the Golden Bears compiled a 0–7–1 record (0–5 against PSCC opponents) and finished in seventh place in the East Division of the PSCC.

== West Division ==
=== Slippery Rock ===
1961 Slippery Rock Rockets football

PSCC West Division champion

PSCC Championship Game, L 0–21 at West Chester
- Conference: Pennsylvania State College Conference
- Record: 6–3 (4–1 PSCC)
- Head coach: Charles Goldlasky (3rd season)

The 1961 Slippery Rock Rockets football team represented Slippery Rock State College (now known as Slippery Rock University of Pennsylvania) of Slippery Rock, Pennsylvania. The team compiled a 6–3 record (4–1 against PSCC opponents), finished in first place in the West Division of the PSCC, and outscored opponents by a total of 176 to 132.

Date	Opponent	Site	Result	Attendance	Source
September 23	Delaware State*	Slippery Rock, PA	W 21–12	3,500	
September 30	Edinboro	Slippery Rock, PA	W 36–6		
October 7	at Waynesburg*	Waynesburg, PA	L 7–18	2,500	
October 14	at Indiana (PA)	Indiana, PA	L 7–14		
October 21	California (PA)	Slippery Rock, PA	W 45–21		
October 28	Shippensburg	Slippery Rock, PA	W 19–13		
November 4	at Westminster*	New Wilmington, PA	W 21–14		
November 11	at Clarion	Clarion, PA	W 20–13		
November 18	at West Chester	West Chester, PA (PSCC Championship Game)	L 0–21		
*Non-conference game

=== California (PA) ===
1961 California Vulcans football
- Conference: Pennsylvania State College Conference
- Record: 5–2–1 (4–1–1 PSCC)
- Head coach: Ted Nemeth (12th season)

The 1961 California Vulcans football team represented California State College (now known as California University of Pennsylvania) of California, Pennsylvania. In their 12th and final year under head coach Ted Nemeth, the team compiled a 5–2–1 record and finished in second place in the West Division of the PSCC.

Date	Opponent	Site	Result	Attendance	Source
September 23	at Indiana (PA)	Indiana, PA	W 13–7		
September 30	at Lock Haven	Lock Haven, PA	W 21–7	2,500	
October 7	vs. Saint Vincent*	Charleroi, PA	W 7–0	3,500	
October 14	Shippensburg^{†}	California, PA	W 47–7	3,000	
October 21	at Slippery Rock	Slippery Rock, PA	L 21–45		
October 28	at Clarion	Clarion, PA	T 14–14		
November 4	Waynesburg*	California, PA	L 7–12		
November 11	Edinboro	California, PA	W 26–19		
*Non-conference game; ^{†}Homecoming

=== Clarion ===
1961 Clarion Golden Eagles football
- Conference: Pennsylvania State College Conference
- Record: 4–3–1 (3–2–1 PSCC)
- Head coach: Ernest Johnson (5th season)

The 1961 Clarion Golden Eagles football team represented Clarion State College (now known as Clarion University of Pennsylvania) of Clarion, Pennsylvania. In their fifth year under head coach Ernest Johnson, the Golden Eagles compiled a 4–3–1 record (3–2–1 against PSCC opponents) and finished in third place in the West Division of the PSCC.

Date	Opponent	Site	Result	Attendance	Source
September 23	Edinboro	Edinboro, PA	L 12–13 (forfeit)		
September 30	at Grove City*	Grove City, PA	W 20–0		
October 7	Lock Haven	Clarion, PA	W 17–7		
October 13	at West Chester	West Chester, PA	L 20–51	6,500	
October 21	Indiana (PA)	Clarion, PA	W 17–6		
October 28	California (PA)	Clarion, PA	T 14–14		
November 4	at Shippensburg	Shippensburg, PA	W 28–26		
November 11	vs. Slippery Rock	Oil City, PA	L 13–20	4,500	
*Non-conference game

=== Lock Haven ===
1961 Lock Haven Bald Eagles football
- Conference: Pennsylvania State College Conference
- Record: 5–2–2 (2–2–1 PSCC)
- Head coach: Hubert Jack (16th season)

The 1961 Lock Haven Bald Eagles football team represented Lock Haven State Teachers College (now known as Lock Haven University of Pennsylvania) of Lock Haven, Pennsylvania. In their 16th year under head coach Hubert Jack, the Bald Eagles compiled a 5–2–2 record (2–2–1 against PSTCC opponents) and finished in fourth place in the PSCC.

Date	Opponent	Site	Result	Attendance	Source
September 16	at Shippensburg	Shippensburg, PA	W 20–0		
	at Brockport*		W 14–0		
	California (PA)	Lock Haven, PA	L 7–21		
	at Clarion	Clarion, PA	L 7–17		
October 14	Bloomsburg*	Lock Haven, PA	W 18–7		
October 21	Edinboro	Lock Haven, PA	T 7–7		
	at Indiana (PA)		W 40–19		
November 4	St. Vincent*	Lock Haven, PA	T 7–7		
	Mansfield	Lock Haven, PA	W 43–19		
*Non-conference game

=== Edinboro ===
1961 Edinboro Fighting Scots football
- Conference: Pennsylvania State College Conference
- Record: 3–4–1 (1–3–1 PSCC)
- Head coach: Loyal K. Park (2nd season)

The 1961 Edinboro Fighting Scots football team represented Edinboro State College (now known as Edinboro University of Pennsylvania) of Edinboro, Pennsylvania. In their second year under head coach Loyal K. Park, the Fighting Scots compiled a 3–4–1 record (1–3–1 against PSCC opponents) and finished in fifth place in the West Division of the PSCC.

Date	Opponent	Site	Result	Attendance	Source
September 23	Clarion	Edinboro, PA	W 13–12 (forfeit)		
September 30	at Slippery Rock	Slippery Rock, PA	L 6–36		
October 7	Indiana (PA)	Edinboro, PA	W 33–7		
October 14	Frederick Community College*	Edinboro, PA	L 6–14		
October 21	at Lock Haven	Lock Haven, PA	T 7–7		
October 28	Lycoming*	Edinboro, PA	W 20–6		
November 4	at Brockport*		W 35–6		
November 11	at California (PA)	California, PA	L 19–26		
*Non-conference game

=== Indiana (PA) ===
1961 Indiana Indians football
- Conference: Pennsylvania State College Conference
- Record: 2–7 (1–4 PSCC)
- Head coach: Sam Smith (13th season)

The 1961 Indiana Indians football team represented Indiana State College (now known as Indiana University of Pennsylvania) of Indiana, Pennsylvania. In their 13th year under head coach Sam Smith, Indiana compiled a 2–7 record (1–6 against PSCC opponents) and finished in sixth place in the PSCC.

Date	Opponent	Site	Result	Attendance	Source
September 16	at East Carolina*	College Stadium; Greenville, NC	L 6–19		
September 23	California (PA)	Indiana, PA	L 7–13		
September 30	at Westminster (PA)*	New Wilmington, PA	L 7–19		
October 7	at Edinboro	Edinboro, PA	L 7–33		
October 14	Slippery Rock	Indiana, PA	W 14–7		
October 21	at Clarion	Clarion, PA	L 6–17		
October 28	Lock Haven		L 19–40		
November 4	Geneva*	Indiana, PA	L 0–6		
November 11	Case Tech*	Indiana, PA	W 37–6		
*Non-conference game

=== Shippensburg ===
1961 Shippensburg Red Raiders football
- Conference: Pennsylvania State College Conference
- Record: 0–8 (0–4 PSCC)
- Head coach: Jack Roddick (7th season)

The 1961 Shippensburg Red Raiders football team represented Shippensburg State College (now known as Shippensburg University of Pennsylvania) of Shippensburg, Pennsylvania. In their eleventh season under head coach Eddie Gulian, the Raiders compiled a 2–5–1 record (1–5–1 against PSTCC opponents) and finished in seventh place in the PSCC.

Date	Opponent	Site	Result	Attendance	Source
September 16	Lock Haven	Shippensburg, PA	L 0–20		
September 23	at Bloomsburg	Bloomsburg, PA	L 7–34		
September 30	Mansfield	Shippensburg, PA	L 21–26		
October 7	East Stroudsburg	Shippensburg, PA	L 7–47		
October 14	at California (PA)	California, PA	L 7–47	3,000	
October 21	at Shepherd*		L 12–32		
October 28	at Slippery Rock	Slippery Rock, PA	L 13–19		
November 4	Clarion	Shippensburg, PA	L 26–28		
*Non-conference game
