= Haverford Fords football =

American college football program

- First season: 1879; 147 years ago
- Last season: 1972; 54 years ago
- Location: Haverford, Pennsylvania
- NCAA division: Division III
- Conference: Middle Atlantic Conference
- Colors: Red and Black
- All-time record: 242–358–39 (.409)
- Rivalries: Swarthmore

The Haverford Fords football team represented Haverford College in college football. The team started in 1879, the third school in Pennsylvania to field a football team, and ended play in 1972 due to a lack of players. The team was rivals with Swarthmore.

== History ==
=== Establishment and early years ===
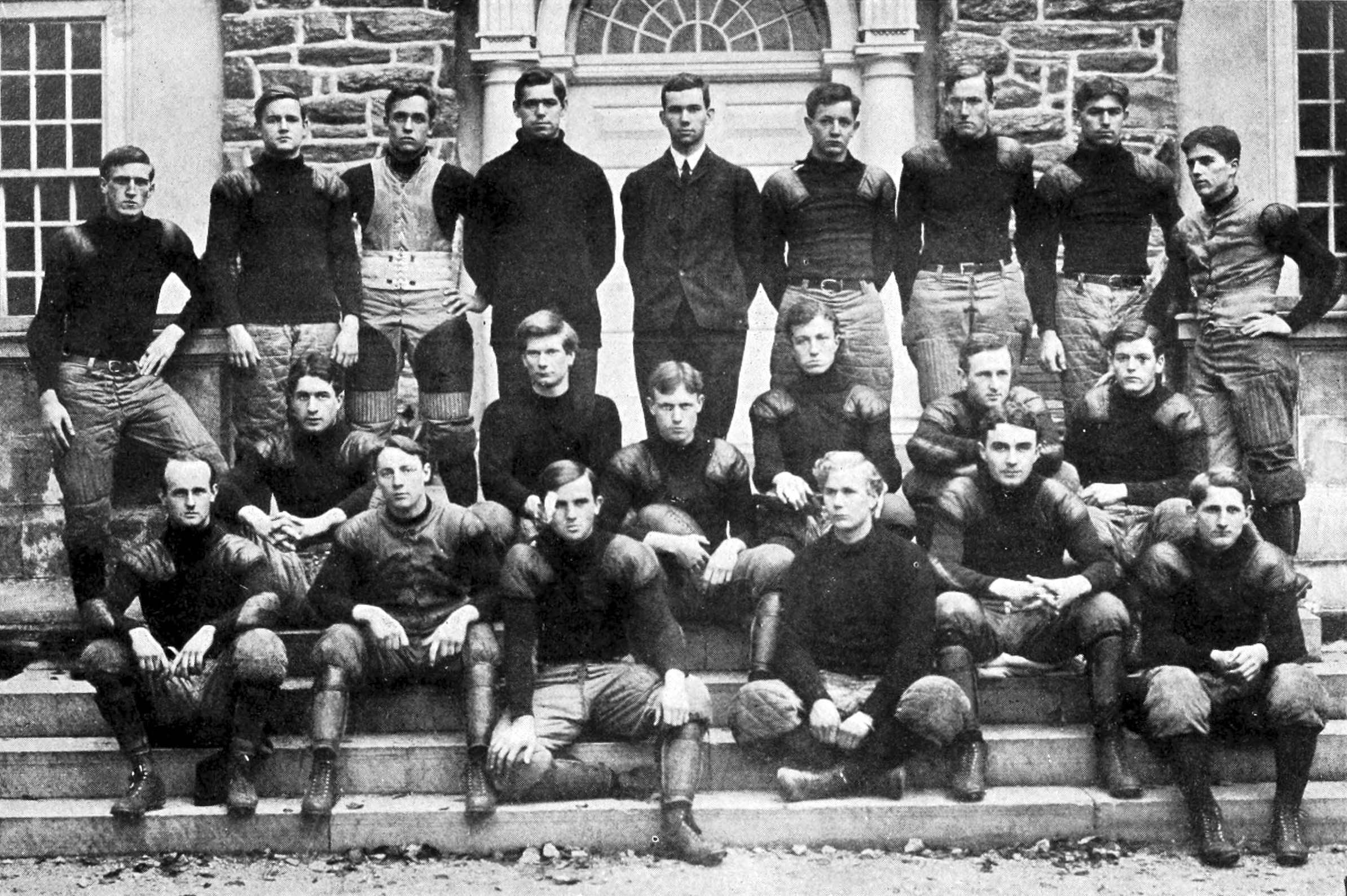
Haverford football team of 1904

In the 1870s, games of football were played informally on Haverford's Founders Green, with classes playing against each other rather than other schools. At the time, the school did not have enough students to field a team for an entire season. The Fords began play as a team in 1879, and claim to be the third school in Pennsylvania to field a football squad. In their inaugural season, they defeated rival Swarthmore, although the team then did not play again until the 1883 season.

A 1894 game between Haverford and Swarthmore features the first known "action shot" photograph of a game, which Swarthmore won 32-0. College athletic director James Babbitt was an important figure in the 1905 rules negotiations that brought the forward pass, 10-yard first down and other innovations into the game.

Haverford is sometimes listed as an original member of Middle Atlantic Conference, which began in 1922. The Fords were a member of the conference beginning at least in the 1945-1946 academic year, and competed in the conference until the dissolution of the football program.

=== End of the program ===
Haverford ended the football program in 1972, after only 9 players joined the team of the expected 30, an insufficient number to field a team, despite the overall enrollment at the school reaching a then-high at 750 students. At the time, Haverford did not recruit for football or offer scholarships for the sport. This resulted in the cancellation of all eight games scheduled for the 1972 season.

Low interest in football was attributed to a reluctance to engage in violent sports by Mike Davis, then a defensive back on the team. Sports historian Benjamin Rader posited that the association of football's violence with Richard Nixon, the unpopular Vietnam War, and right-wing politics contributed to its demise. Former Haverford Athletic director Greg Kannerstein attribute the team's demise to rule changes in the 1960s which allowed teams to substitute at-will, greatly expanding the size of football rosters. From 1959 to 1971, the Fords never won more than two games per season.

Haverford ended play with an all-time record of 242-358-39.

There was discussion in 1973 about restarting the football team. Dana Swan, at the time head football coach, told a task force of students and faculty that a credible program would need between 40 and 45 players, which effectively killed any effort to restart the program. William Hohenstein, at the time a professor of sociology at Haverford, told the Haverford-Bryn Mawr College News, a student newspaper, that football should not return at the expense of lowering academic standards or reducing female enrollment.
