= 1961 Ivy League football season =

- League: NCAA University Division
- Sport: Football
- Duration: September 30, 1961 – November 25, 1961
- Teams: 8

1962 NFL Draft
- Top draft pick: None

Regular season
- Champions: Columbia; Harvard

Football seasons
- ← 1960 1962 →

1961 Ivy League football standings
	Conf.					Overall
Team	W		L		T	W		L		T
Columbia +	6	–	1	–	0	6	–	3	–	0
Harvard +	6	–	1	–	0	6	–	3	–	0
Dartmouth	5	–	2	–	0	6	–	3	–	0
Princeton	5	–	2	–	0	5	–	4	–	0
Yale	3	–	4	–	0	4	–	5	–	0
Cornell	2	–	5	–	0	3	–	6	–	0
Penn	1	–	6	–	0	2	–	7	–	0
Brown	0	–	7	–	0	0	–	9	–	0
+ – Conference co-champions

The 1961 Ivy League football season was the sixth season of college football play for the Ivy League and was part of the 1961 college football season. The season began on September 30, 1961, and ended on November 25, 1961. Ivy League teams were 4–11 against non-conference opponents and Columbia and Harvard won the conference co-championship.

== Season overview ==
Conf. Rank	Team	Head coach	AP final	AP high	Overall record	Conf. record	PPG	PAG
1 (tie)	Columbia	Aldo Donelli	NR	NR	6–3	6–1	26.7	13.0
1 (tie)	Harvard	John Yovicsin	NR	NR	6–3	6–1	17.8	10.8
3 (tie)	Dartmouth	Bob Blackman	NR	NR	6–3	5–2	21.9	11.6
3 (tie)	Princeton	Dick Colman	NR	NR	5–4	5–2	19.2	14.2
5	Yale	Jordan Olivar	NR	NR	4–5	3–4	11.0	11.7
6	Cornell	Tom Harp	NR	NR	3–6	2–5	15.9	15.2
7	Penn	John Stiegman	NR	NR	2–7	1–6	4.7	21.6
8	Brown	John McLaughry	NR	NR	0–9	0–7	2.7	27.2

== Schedule ==
Index to colors and formatting
Ivy League member won
Ivy League member lost
Ivy League teams in **bold**

=== Week 1 ===
Date	Visiting team	Home team	Site	Result
September 30	**Columbia**	Brown	Brown Stadium • Providence, RI	**COL** 50–0
September 30	Lehigh	Harvard	Harvard Stadium • Boston, MA	**L** 17–22
September 30	New Hampshire	Dartmouth	Memorial Field • Hanover, NH	**W** 28–3
September 30	Rutgers	Princeton	Palmer Stadium • Princeton, NJ	**L** 13–16
September 30	Connecticut	Yale	Yale Bowl • New Haven, CT	**W** 18–0
September 30	Colgate	Cornell	Schoellkopf Field • Ithaca, NY	**W** 34–0
September 30	Lafayette	Penn	Franklin Field • Philadelphia, PA	**W** 14–7

=== Week 2 ===
Date	Visiting team	Home team	Site	Result
October 7	**Princeton**	**Columbia**	Baker Field • New York City, NY	**PRIN** 30–20
October 7	**Cornell**	**Harvard**	Harvard Stadium • Boston, MA	**HAR** 14–0
October 7	**Dartmouth**	**Penn**	Franklin Field • Philadelphia, PA	**DART** 30–0
October 7	**Brown**	**Yale**	Yale Bowl • New Haven, CT	**YALE** 14–3

=== Week 3 ===
Date	Visiting team	Home team	Site	Result
October 14	**Columbia**	**Yale**	Yale Bowl • New Haven, CT	**COL** 11–0
October 14	Colgate	**Harvard**	Harvard Stadium • Boston, MA	**L** 0–15
October 14	**Brown**	**Dartmouth**	Memorial Field • Hanover, NH	**DART** 34–0
October 14	**Penn**	**Princeton**	Palmer Stadium • Princeton, NJ	**PRIN** 9–3
October 14	Navy	**Cornell**	Schoellkopf Field • Ithaca, NY	**L** 7–31

=== Week 4 ===
Date	Visiting team	Home team	Site	Result
October 21	**Columbia**	**Harvard**	Harvard Stadium • Boston, MA	**COL** 26–14
October 21	**Dartmouth**	Holy Cross	Fitton Field • Worcester, MA	**L** 13–17
October 21	Colgate	**Princeton**	Palmer Stadium • Princeton, NJ	**L** 0–15
October 21	**Yale**	**Cornell**	Schoellkopf Field • Ithaca, NY	**YALE** 12–0
October 21	**Brown**	**Penn**	Franklin Field • Philadelphia, PA	**PENN** 7–0

=== Week 5 ===
Date	Visiting team	Home team	Site	Result
October 28	Lehigh	Columbia	Baker Field • New York City, NY	**L** 7–14
October 28	**Dartmouth**	Harvard	Harvard Stadium • Boston, MA	**HAR** 21–15
October 28	**Cornell**	Princeton	Palmer Stadium • Princeton, NJ	**PRIN** 30–25
October 28	Colgate	Yale	Yale Bowl • New Haven, CT	**L** 8–14
October 28	Rutgers	Penn	Franklin Field • Philadelphia, PA	**L** 6–20
October 28	Rhode Island	Brown	Brown Stadium • Providence, RI	**L** 9–12

=== Week 6 ===
Date	Visiting team	Home team	Site	Result
November 4	**Columbia**	**Cornell**	Schoellkopf Field • Ithaca, NY	**COL** 35–7
November 4	**Harvard**	**Penn**	Franklin Field • Philadelphia, PA	**HAR** 37–6
November 4	**Dartmouth**	**Yale**	Yale Bowl • New Haven, CT	**DART** 24–8
November 4	**Princeton**	**Brown**	Brown Stadium • Providence, RI	**PRIN** 52–0

=== Week 7 ===
Date	Visiting team	Home team	Site	Result
November 11	**Dartmouth**	**Columbia**	Baker Field • New York City, NY	**COL** 35–14
November 11	**Princeton**	**Harvard**	Harvard Stadium • Boston, MA	**HAR** 9–7
November 11	**Yale**	**Penn**	Franklin Field • Philadelphia, PA	**YALE** 23–0
November 11	**Brown**	**Cornell**	Schoellkopf Field • Ithaca, NY	**COR** 25–0

=== Week 8 ===
Date	Visiting team	Home team	Site	Result
November 18	**Penn**	**Columbia**	Baker Field • New York City, NY	**COL** 37–6
November 18	**Brown**	**Harvard**	Harvard Stadium • Boston, MA	**HAR** 21–6
November 18	**Cornell**	**Dartmouth**	Memorial Field • Hanover, NH	**DART** 15–14
November 18	**Yale**	**Princeton**	Palmer Stadium • Princeton, NJ	**PRIN** 26–16

=== Week 9 ===
Date	Visiting team	Home team	Site	Result
November 23	Colgate	**Brown**	Brown Stadium • Providence, RI	**L** 6–30
November 25	**Columbia**	Rutgers	Rutgers Stadium • Piscataway, NJ	**L** 19–32
November 25	**Harvard**	**Yale**	Yale Bowl • New Haven, CT	**HAR** 27–0
November 25	**Dartmouth**	**Princeton**	Palmer Stadium • Princeton, NJ	**DART** 24–6
November 25	**Cornell**	**Penn**	Franklin Field • Philadelphia, PA	**COR** 31–0
