= Bob Clifford (American football) =

American football player and coach (1913–2006)

Biographical details
- Born: October 10, 1913; East Orange, New Jersey, U.S.
- Died: January 28, 2006 (aged 92); Epsom, New Hampshire, U.S.

Playing career
- 1935–1937: Western State (CO)

Coaching career (HC unless noted)
- 1939–1940: Sugar City HS (CO)
- 1941: Littleton HS (CO)
- 1946: Washington Irving HS (NY)
- 1947–1950: Northwestern (freshmen)
- 1951–1953: Northwestern (line)
- 1954–1955: Williams (line)
- 1956–1961: Colby
- 1962–1969: Vermont

Head coaching record
- Overall: 60–48–1

Robert E. Clifford (October 10, 1913 – January 28, 2006) was an American football player and coach. Following his playing career at Western Colorado University, he served as the head football coach at Colby College in Waterville, Maine from 1956 to 1961 and at the University of Vermont from 1962 to 1969. He is the winningest coach in Vermont history. He compiled a career college football coaching record of 60–48–1.

== Biography ==
Clifford was born in East Orange, New Jersey and raised in Ware, Massachusetts and New Haven, Connecticut. He graduated from Wilbur Cross High School and Western State College, where he was captain of the football and golf teams and a member of the basketball team. He received his B.A. from Western State in 1939 and began his coaching career at Sugar City High School in Sugar City, Colorado. In 1941, he moved to Littleton High School in Littleton, Colorado. During World War II, he was a PT boat captain in New Guinea, the Philippines, and Borneo. From 1946 to 1947, Clifford did graduate work in health and administration at Teachers College, Columbia University and coached football and basketball at Washington Irving High School in Tarrytown, New York.

In 1947, Clifford joined the athletic staff at Northwestern University as freshman football and basketball coach. He became assistant varsity coach and head coach of the junior varsity squad for those sports in 1951. In 1954, he became the line coach of the Williams College football team. He also served as the school's assistant swimming coach and freshman golf coach.

In 1956, Clifford was named head football coach at Colby College. He also coached the school's golf team. In his six seasons as football coach, Clifford compiled a 23–19 record. In 1962, he left Colby to become the head football coach at the University of Vermont. Over eight seasons with the Catamounts, he amassed a 37–29–1 and became the winningest coach in school history. In 1966, he was a candidate for the head coaching job at Brown University, but withdrew his name from consideration. In Vermont with 3–6 and 1969 and at the end of the season, 13 of the team's 15 seniors publicly expressed concern over the team's low morale. Clifford resigned as head coach on December 11, 1969.

== Head coaching record ==
Year	Team	Overall	Conference	Standing	Bowl/playoffs
Colby Mules (Independent) (1956–1961)
1956	Colby	1–6			
1957	Colby	3–3			
1958	Colby	5–2			
1959	Colby	5–2			
1960	Colby	5–2			
1961	Colby	4–4			
Colby:		23–19			
Vermont Catamounts (Yankee Conference) (1962–1969)
1962	Vermont	3–5	1–3	5th	
1963	Vermont	6–2	2–2	4th	
1964	Vermont	7–1	3–1	2nd	
1965	Vermont	6–2	2–2	T–3rd	
1966	Vermont	6–2	3–2	2nd	
1967	Vermont	3–5–1	1–3–1	5th	
1968	Vermont	3–6	1–4	6th	
1969	Vermont	3–6	2–3	4th	
Vermont:		37–29–1	15–20–1		
Total:		60–48–1			
