= 1961 Columbia Lions football team =

American college football season

1961 Columbia Lions football
- 1961 Columbia football team in Baker Field stands

Ivy League co-champion
- Conference: Ivy League
- Record: 6–3 (6–1 Ivy)
- Head coach: Aldo Donelli (5th season)
- Offensive scheme: Wing-T
- Captain: Bill Campbell
- Home stadium: Baker Field

1961 Ivy League football standings
	Conf.					Overall
Team	W		L		T	W		L		T
Columbia +	6	–	1	–	0	6	–	3	–	0
Harvard +	6	–	1	–	0	6	–	3	–	0
Dartmouth	5	–	2	–	0	6	–	3	–	0
Princeton	5	–	2	–	0	5	–	4	–	0
Yale	3	–	4	–	0	4	–	5	–	0
Cornell	2	–	5	–	0	3	–	6	–	0
Penn	1	–	6	–	0	2	–	7	–	0
Brown	0	–	7	–	0	0	–	9	–	0
+ – Conference co-champions

The 1961 Columbia Lions football team was an American football team that represented Columbia University in the 1961 college football season as a member of the Ivy League. In their fifth year head coach Aldo Donelli, the Lions compiled a 6–3 record (6–1 in conference game) and outscored opponents by a total of 240 to 117. They won Columbia's first Ivy League championship, sharing the title with Harvard. Columbia did not again claim a share of the title until 2024.

Although Columbia had accumulated an Ivy record of 4–10 in the previous two seasons, expectations for the team in 1961 were high; the Columbia Spectator wrote before the season, "[i]f practically no one gets hurt, if a few key sophomores come through, and most important of all, if [Aldo] Donelli's nineteen experienced seniors get fighting mad, then no Ivy League squad will have a chance against the Lions."

The Lions began the season on the road against Brown, whom they defeated in one of the most lopsided victories in Columbia Lions history, but followed up with a homecoming defeat against Princeton; despite this, Princeton's head coach, Dick Colman, said, "I'll tell you this much–they had the better team." Although the team had led the Tigers 14–0, depth was and remained an issue throughout the season for the Lions; Columbia had only 14 players that consistently played and did not have separate offensive and defensive units. The team entered the penultimate week of the season having to defeat Penn to win a share of the conference title. Playing without their captain, Bill Campbell, who had been injured, the Lions defeated the Quakers, 37–6.

The team played its home games at Baker Field in the Inwood neighborhood of Manhattan, New York City.

== Schedule ==
Date	Opponent	Site	Result	Attendance	Source
September 30	at Brown	Brown Stadium; Providence, RI	W 50–0	9,000	
October 7	Princeton^{†}	Baker Field; New York, NY	L 20–30	23,700	
October 14	at Yale	Yale Bowl; New Haven, CT	W 11–0	22,188	
October 21	at Harvard	Harvard Stadium; Boston, MA	W 26–14	11,000	
October 28	Lehigh*	Baker Field; New York, NY	L 7–14	10,000–10,429	
November 4	at Cornell	Schoellkopf Field; Ithaca, NY (rivalry)	W 35–7	8,000	
November 11	Dartmouth	Baker Field; New York, NY	W 35–14	25,106	
November 18	Penn	Baker Field; New York, NY	W 37–6	17,066	
November 25	at Rutgers*	Rutgers Stadium; Piscataway, NJ	L 19–32	25,500	
*Non-conference game; ^{†}Homecoming

== Statistics ==
The 1961 Lions tallied 2,726 yards of total offense in nine games for an average 302.9 yards per game. The team's offensive output was divided between 1,920 rushing yards and 806 passing yards. On defense, the Lions held opponents to 1,914 yards (212.7 yards per game), consisting of 1,322 rushing yards and 592 passing yards.

Halfback Tom Haggerty led the team with 647 rushing yards on 131 carries for an average of 4.9 yards per carry. He also led the team in scoring with 62 points on ten touchdowns and two points after touchdown. He also returned a punt 85 yards for a touchdown, completed a pass, had six pass receptions, intercepted a pass while playing on defense, and led the team with 652 yards of total offense.

Russ Warren was also a major contributor on offense. He tallied 489 rushing yards on 109 carries for an average of 4.5 yards per carry. He also caubht 12 passes for 189 yards (second most on the team). His totals of 48 points scored (seven touchdowns, three two-point conversions) and 678 all-purpose yards were second best on the team. Warren was also the team's punter, totaling 25 punts for 1,027 yards, an average of 41.1 yards per punt.

Tom O'Connor was the team's third-best rusher with 418 yards on 84 carries for an average of 5.0 yards per carry. O'Connor also handled place-kicking and converted all four of his field goal attempts. He ranked third on the team in scoring with 46 points (four touchdowns, four field goals, four extra point kicks, and three two-point conversions. He also had a pass interception on defense.

Quarterback Tommy Vasell completed 52 of 101 passes (51.5%) for 639 yards with four touchdowns, and nine interceptions. He ranked second on the team with 597 yards of total offense.

Len DeFiore led the team in interceptions with four. Al Butts had three, and Mike Hassan had two.

== Awards and honors ==
Four Columbia players received first-team honors on the 1961 All All-Ivy football team: tackle Bob Asack, guard Tony Day, halfback Tom Haggerty, and back Tom O'Connor. Three others were named to the second team: tackle Ed Little, center Lee Black, and quarterback Tom Vasell.

In 2006, the 1961 Columbia Lions football team became the fourth sports team to be inducted into the Columbia University Athletics Hall of Fame, in recognition of their championship season.

== Players ==
- Bob Asack, tackle
- Lee Black, center
- Al Butts, fullback/halfback, sophomore
- Bill Campbell (#67), captain
- Buzz Congram, end
- Tony Day (#60), guard
- Len DiFiore, quarterback
- Tom Haggerty, halfback
- Dick Hassan, end
- Mike Hassan, halfback
- Ed Little, tackle
- Fred Mundorff, halfback
- Tom O'Connor (#30), fullback
- Dick Sakala, quarterback
- Russ Warren, tailback
- Tom Vasell, quarterback
- Ron Williams, end
