= 1951 Maine Black Bears football team =

American college football season

1951 Maine Black Bears football

Yankee Conference champion MIAA champion
- Conference: Yankee Conference, Maine Intercollegiate Athletic Association
- Record: 6–0–1 (3–0–1 Yankee, 3–0 MIAA)
- Head coach: Harold Westerman (1st season)
- Captain: Peter Pocius Jr.
- Home stadium: Alumni Field

1951 Yankee Conference football standings
	Conf.					Overall
Team	W		L		T	W		L		T
Maine $	3	–	0	–	1	6	–	0	–	1
UMass	2	–	0	–	0	3	–	4	–	1
Connecticut	2	–	1	–	0	4	–	4	–	0
New Hampshire	1	–	2	–	1	5	–	2	–	1
Rhode Island	1	–	3	–	0	3	–	5	–	0
Vermont	0	–	3	–	0	0	–	7	–	0
$ – Conference champion

The 1951 Maine Black Bears football team was an American football team that represented the University of Maine as a member of the Yankee Conference and Maine Intercollegiate Athletic Association during the 1951 college football season. In its first season under head coach Harold Westerman, the team compiled a 6–0–1 record (3–0–1 against Yankee Conference and 3–0 against MIAA opponents) and won the Yankee Conference and MIAA championships, and outscored opponents by a total of 193 to 40. It was the first undefeated season in the history of the Maine football program.

The team gained 1,601 rushing yards and 379 passing yards (21 for 55). On defense, they gave up 934 rushing yards and 706 passing yards. The team's individual statistical leaders included:

- Halfback Ed Bogdanovich gained 562 rushing yards on 113 carries. He was also the leading rusher in the Yankee Conference and the only unanimous choice for the All-Yankee Conference team.
- Gene Sturgeon and Steve Novick shared the quarterback position. Sturgeon completed nine of 25 passes for 185 yards, two touchdowns and six interceptions. Novick completed 10 of 23 passes for 155 yards, two touchdowns, and four interceptions.
- End Bob Whytock caught 10 passes for 239 receiving yards.
- Bogdanovich and fullback Gordon Pendleton tied with 30 points each.

Seven Maine players received all-conference honors: Bogdanovich; Sturgeon; center Winfred "Bud" Brown; offensive end Harry Easton; offensive guard and team captain Peter Pocius; defensive tackle Gordon Thorburn; and defensive backJack Butterfield.

The team played its home games at Alumni Field in Orono, Maine.

== Schedule ==
Date	Opponent	Site	Result	Attendance	Source
September 29	Rhode Island	Alumni Field; Orono, ME	W 12–0		
October 6	Vermont	Alumni Field; Orono, ME	W 42–0		
October 13	at New Hampshire	Lewis Field; Durham, NH (rivalry)	T 0–0		
October 20	Connecticut	Athletic Field; Orono, ME	W 49–19		
October 27	at Bates	Garcelon Field; Lewiston, ME	W 26–7		
November 3	at Colby	Seaverns Field; Waterville, ME	W 24–0	3,500	
November 10	Bowdoin^{†}	Alumni Field; Orono, ME	W 40–14	11,600	
^{†}Homecoming
