= 1965 Maine Black Bears football team =

American college football season

1965 Maine Black Bears football

Yankee Conference champion, Lambert Trophy

Tangerine Bowl, L 0-31 vs. East Carolina
- Conference: Yankee Conference

Ranking
- Coaches: No. 6
- AP: No. 7
- Record: 8–2 (5–0 Yankee)
- Head coach: Harold Westerman (16th season)
- Captains: Alan Riley; Walter Hirst
- Home stadium: Alumni Field

1965 Yankee Conference football standings
| | Conf. | | | | | Overall |
| Team | W | | L | | T | W | | L | | T |
|---|---|---|---|---|---|---|---|---|---|---|
| Maine $ | 5 | – | 0 | – | 0 | 8 | – | 2 | – | 0 |
| UMass | 4 | – | 1 | – | 0 | 7 | – | 2 | – | 0 |
| Vermont | 2 | – | 2 | – | 0 | 6 | – | 2 | – | 0 |
| Connecticut | 2 | – | 2 | – | 0 | 3 | – | 6 | – | 0 |
| Rhode Island | 1 | – | 4 | – | 0 | 2 | – | 7 | – | 0 |
| New Hampshire | 0 | – | 5 | – | 0 | 0 | – | 8 | – | 0 |
$ – Conference champion

The 1965 Maine Black Bears football team was an American football team that represented the University of Maine as a member of the Yankee Conference during the 1965 NCAA College Division football season. In its 15th season under head coach Harold Westerman, the team compiled an 8–2 record (5–0 against conference opponents), won the Yankee Conference championship, and lost to East Carolina in the 1965 Tangerine Bowl. Alan Riley and Walter Hirst were the team captains.

The team's statistical leaders included halfback Frank Harney with 416 rushing yards, 410 receiving yards, and 54 points scored; and quarterback Dick De Varney with 1,592 passing yards.

== Schedule ==
| Date | Opponent | Rank | Site | Result | Attendance | Source |
|---|---|---|---|---|---|---|
| September 18 | UMass | | Alumni Field; Orono, ME | W 10–8 | 9,200–9,215 | |
| September 25 | at Boston University* | | Nickerson Field; Boston, MA | W 18–7 | 11,000 | |
| October 2 | Vermont | | Alumni Field; Orono, ME | W 35–6 | 6,900–7,900 | |
| October 9 | at New Hampshire | No. 6 | Cowell Stadium; Durham, NH (rivalry) | W 48–13 | 7,000–7,500 | |
| October 16 | Connecticut^{†} | No. 4 | Alumni Field; Orono, ME | W 24–6 | 9,400 | |
| October 23 | at Rhode Island | No. 3 | Meade Stadium; Kingston, RI | W 36–0 | 10,000–10,669 | |
| October 30 | at Colby* | No. 2 | Seavern Field; Waterville, ME | W 42–14 | 6,000 | |
| November 6 | Youngstown State* | No. 2 | Alumni Field; Orono, ME | W 27–22 | 7,500 | |
| November 13 | at Tampa* | No. 2 | Phillips Field; Tampa, FL | L 0–2 | 11,000 | |
| December 12 | vs. No. 8 East Carolina* | No. 7 | Tangerine Bowl; Orlando, FL (Tangerine Bowl) | L 0–31 | 8,350 | |
*Non-conference game; ^{†}Homecoming; Rankings from AP Poll released prior to the game
