= 1961 Maine Black Bears football team =

American college football season

1961 Maine Black Bears football

Yankee Conference champion Lewis O. Barrows Trophy (MIAA champion)
- Conference: Yankee Conference, Maine Intercollegiate Athletic Association
- Record: 8–0–1 (5–0 Yankee, 2–0–1 MIAA)
- Head coach: Harold Westerman (11th season)
- Captains: Robert Kinney; Dave Cloutier
- Home stadium: Alumni Field

1961 Yankee Conference football standings
	Conf.					Overall
Team	W		L		T	W		L		T
Maine $	5	–	0	–	0	8	–	0	–	1
UMass	3	–	1	–	0	5	–	4	–	0
Connecticut	2	–	2	–	0	2	–	7	–	0
New Hampshire	1	–	3	–	0	3	–	5	–	0
Rhode Island	1	–	4	–	0	2	–	6	–	1
Vermont	0	–	2	–	0	3	–	3	–	1
$ – Conference champion

The 1961 Maine Black Bears football team was an American football team that represented the University of Maine as a member of the Yankee Conference and Maine Intercollegiate Athletic Association during the 1961 college football season. In its 11th season under head coach Harold Westerman, the Black Bears compiled an 8–0–1 record (5–0 in Yankee Conference and 2–0–1 in MIAA games) and won the Yankee Conference championship. They also compiled a 2–0–1 record in Maine State Series competition to win the Lewis O. Barrows Trophy.

The team was led by quarterback Manchester Wheeler (715 passing yards), halfback Dave Cloutier (42 points scored), and end Dick Kinney (171 receiving yards). All three were selected as first-team players on the 1961 All-Yankee Conference team. Kinney and Cloutier were also the team captains.

The team played its home games at Alumni Field in Orono, Maine.

== Schedule ==
Date	Opponent	Site	Result	Attendance	Source
September 23	Army B team*	Alumni Field; Orono, ME	W 21–6	4,800	
September 30	at Rhode Island	Meade Stadium; Kingston, RI	W 22–20	3,500	
October 7	Vermont	Alumni Field; Orono, ME	W 34–14	4,600–5,000	
October 14	at New Hampshire	Cowell Stadium; Durham, NH (Battle for the Brice–Cowell Musket)	W 7–6	7,500–8,500	
October 21	Connecticut	Alumni Field; Orono, ME	W 2–0	8,000	
October 28	at Bates	Garcelon Field; Lewiston, ME	T 15–15	4,500-8,500+	
November 4	at Colby	Seaverns Field; Waterville, ME	W 14–0	5,000	
November 11	Bowdoin*	Alumni Field; Orono, ME	W 13–8	9,000	
November 22	UMass	Alumni Field; Orono, ME	W 10–7	4,500	
*Non-conference game

== Statistics ==
The 1961 Black Bears tallied 2,242 yards of total offense (249.1 per game), consisting of 1,482 rushing yards (164.7 per game) and 760 passing yards (84.4 per game). On defense, they gave up 1,618 yards (179.8 per game) with 761 rushing yards (84.6 per game) and 857 passing yards (95.2 per game).

Fullback Dale Curry led the team in rushing with 291 yards on 82 carries. Halfback Dave Cloutier ranked second with 230 yards on 50 carries. Cloutier led the team in scoring with 42 points on seven touchdowns.

Quarterback Manchester Wheeler complete 43 of 96 passes for 715 yards with 11 interceptions and eight touchdowns. The leading receivers were end Richard Kinney (10 receptions, 171 yards, two touchdowns) and halfback Dave Cloutier (seve receptions, 161 yards, three touchdowns).

== Honors and awards ==
Three Maine players were selected by the conference coaches as first-team players on the 1961 All-Yankee Conference football team: Manchester Wheeler at quarterback; Dave Cloutier at halfback; and Dick Kinney at end.

Cloutier was also selected by the Dallas Cowboys in the 18th round, 242nd overall pick, of the 1962 NFL draft.
