= 1962 Maine Black Bears football team =

American college football season

1962 Maine Black Bears football

MIAA champion
- Conference: Yankee Conference, Maine Intercollegiate Athletic Association
- Record: 4–4 (1–4 Yankee, 3–0 MIAA)
- Head coach: Harold Westerman (12th season)
- Captains: Alton Hadley III; John Roberts
- Home stadium: Alumni Field

1962 Yankee Conference football standings
	Conf.					Overall
Team	W		L		T	W		L		T
New Hampshire $	4	–	0	–	1	7	–	0	–	1
UMass	4	–	1	–	0	6	–	3	–	0
Connecticut	2	–	2	–	0	3	–	6	–	0
Rhode Island	1	–	3	–	1	2	–	5	–	2
Vermont	1	–	3	–	0	3	–	5	–	0
Maine	1	–	4	–	0	4	–	4	–	0
$ – Conference champion

The 1962 Maine Black Bears football team was an American football team that represented the University of Maine as a member of the Yankee Conference and Maine Intercollegiate Athletic Association during the 1962 NCAA College Division football season. In its 12th season under head coach Harold Westerman, the team compiled a 4–4 record (1–4 against Yankee Conference and 3–0 against MIAA opponents) and finished last out of the six teams in the Yankee Conference. The team played its home games at Alumni Field in Orono, Maine. Alton Hadley III and John Roberts were the team captains.

The team's statistical leaders included fullback William Chard with 297 rushing yards; quarterback Tom Austin with 340 passing yards; end Robert Robertson with 95 receiving yards; and halfback Michael Haley with 24 points scored.

== Schedule ==
Date	Opponent	Site	Result	Attendance	Source
September 22	at UMass	Alumni Field; Amherst, MA	L 0–10	7,000–7,058	
September 29	Rhode Island	Alumni Field; Orono, ME	L 7–14	5,000	
October 6	at Vermont	Centennial Field; Burlington, VT	W 9–6	5,500–6,000	
October 13	New Hampshire	Alumni Field; Orono, ME (rivalry)	L 6–21	7,000	
October 20	at Connecticut	Memorial Stadium; Storrs, CT	L 6–14	11,088–12,500	
October 27	Bates	Alumni Field; Orono, ME	W 20–0	4,000	
November 3	Colby	Alumni Field; Orono, ME	W 27–0	5,000	
November 10	at Bowdoin	Whittier Field; Brunswick, ME	W 27–2	3,500	
