= 1961 Princeton Tigers football team =

American college football season

1961 Princeton Tigers football
- Conference: Ivy League
- Record: 5–4 (5–2 Ivy)
- Head coach: Dick Colman (5th season)
- Captain: Edwin A. Weihenmayer
- Home stadium: Palmer Stadium

1961 Ivy League football standings
	Conf.					Overall
Team	W		L		T	W		L		T
Columbia +	6	–	1	–	0	6	–	3	–	0
Harvard +	6	–	1	–	0	6	–	3	–	0
Dartmouth	5	–	2	–	0	6	–	3	–	0
Princeton	5	–	2	–	0	5	–	4	–	0
Yale	3	–	4	–	0	4	–	5	–	0
Cornell	2	–	5	–	0	3	–	6	–	0
Penn	1	–	6	–	0	2	–	7	–	0
Brown	0	–	7	–	0	0	–	9	–	0
+ – Conference co-champions

The 1961 Princeton Tigers football team was an American football team that represented Princeton University as a member of the Ivy League during the 1961 college football season. In their fifth year under head coach Dick Colman, the Tigers compiled a 5–4 record (5–2 in conference games), tied for third place in the Ivy League, and outscored opponents by a total of 173 to 128 (160 to 97 in conference games).

On November 4, 1961, Princeton defeated Brown, 52-0, the worst defeat in the history of Brown football. Princeton at that point was in first place in the Ivy League with a 4-0 conference record. However, the team sustained a spate of injuries and lost two of its final three games "after the injury jinx struck.

Senior guard Edwin A. Weihenmayer was the team captain. Tailback Greg Riley led the Ivy League with 693 yards of total offense (459 rushing, 265 passing). Greg Riley led the team in rushing with 459 yards. Riley and end Barry Schuman were selected as first-team players on the 1961 All-Ivy League football team.

Princeton under Colman in the 1960s was the last major college team to rely on the single-wing formation offense.

Princeton played its home games at Palmer Stadium on the university campus in Princeton, New Jersey.

== Schedule ==
Date	Opponent	Site	Result	Attendance	Source
September 30	Rutgers*	Palmer Stadium; Princeton, NJ (rivalry)	L 13–16	41,000	
October 7	at Columbia	Baker Field; New York, NY	W 30–20	23,700	
October 14	Penn	Palmer Stadium; Princeton, NJ (rivalry)	W 9–3	22,000	
October 21	Colgate*	Palmer Stadium; Princeton, NJ	L 0–15	12,000	
October 28	Cornell	Palmer Stadium; Princeton, NJ	W 30–25	28,000	
November 4	at Brown	Brown Stadium; Providence, RI	W 52–0	10,000	
November 11	at Harvard	Harvard Stadium; Boston, MA (rivalry)	L 7–9	30,000	
November 18	Yale	Palmer Stadium; Princeton, NJ (rivalry)	W 26–16	42,000	
November 25	Dartmouth	Palmer Stadium; Princeton, NJ	L 6–24	30,000	
*Non-conference game

== Statistics ==
The 1961 Princeton Tigers tallied an average of 195.0 rushing yards and 125.2 passing yards per game. On defense, they gave up 193.4 rushing yards and 85.1 passing yards per game.

Tailback Greg Riley led the team with 459 rushing yards on 90 carries, an average of 5.1 yards per game. He also completed 24 of 43 passes for 265 yards with one touchdown and four interceptions. His combined total of 693 yards led the Ivy League in total offense.

Tailback Pete Porietis led the team in passing, completing 25 of 44 passes for 304 yards with three touchdowns and three interceptions. He also tallied 389 rushing yards on 90 carries for an average of 4.3 yards per carry.

The team's leading receivers were wingback Jim Rockenbach (seven receptions, 241 yards), Barry Schuman (15 receptions, 178 yards), Hank Large (nine receptions, 145 yards), and Jim Hunter (11 receptions, 134 yards).

== Players ==
- Tim Callard, guard
- Andy Conner, tackle
- Costello, tackle
- John Henrich, quarterback/blocking back
- Hank Large, end
- Arlyn Lichthardt, end
- Hugh MacMillan, tailback
- Bill Merlini, fullback
- Pete Porietis, tailback, sophomore
- Greg Riley, halfback/tailback
- Jim Rockenbach, wingback, sophomore
- Barry Schuman, end
- Dan Terpack, halfback/wingback
- Brad Urquhart, fullback/wingback
- Bob Van DerVoort, center
- Ed Weihenmayer, guard and captain
- West, end
