= 1961 Harvard Crimson football team =

American college football season

1961 Harvard Crimson football

Ivy League co-champion
- Conference: Ivy League
- Record: 6–3 (6–1 Ivy)
- Head coach: John Yovicsin (5th season)
- Captain: Alex W. “Pete” Hart
- Home stadium: Harvard Stadium

1961 Ivy League football standings
	Conf.					Overall
Team	W		L		T	W		L		T
Columbia +	6	–	1	–	0	6	–	3	–	0
Harvard +	6	–	1	–	0	6	–	3	–	0
Dartmouth	5	–	2	–	0	6	–	3	–	0
Princeton	5	–	2	–	0	5	–	4	–	0
Yale	3	–	4	–	0	4	–	5	–	0
Cornell	2	–	5	–	0	3	–	6	–	0
Penn	1	–	6	–	0	2	–	7	–	0
Brown	0	–	7	–	0	0	–	9	–	0
+ – Conference co-champions

The 1961 Harvard Crimson football team was an American football team that represented Harvard University as a member of the Ivy League during the 1961 college football season. In their fifth year under head coach John Yovicsin, the Crimson compiled a 6–3 record (6–1 in conference games) and outscored opponents by a total of 160 to 97 (143 to 60 in conference games). They tied with Columbia for the Ivy League championship even though Harvard lost to Columbia by a 26–14 score during the season.

Alex W. "Pete" Hart was the team captain. Three Harvard players received first-team all-conference honors: end Bob Boyds; tackle Darwin Wile; and guard Bill Swinford.

Harvard played its home games at Harvard Stadium in the Allston neighborhood of Boston, Massachusetts.

== Schedule ==
Date	Opponent	Site	Result	Attendance	Source
September 30	Lehigh*	Harvard Stadium; Boston, MA	L 17–22	11,000	
October 7	Cornell	Harvard Stadium; Boston, MA	W 14–0	11,000	
October 14	Colgate*	Harvard Stadium; Boston, MA	L 0–15	12,000	
October 21	Columbia	Harvard Stadium; Boston, MA	L 14–26	11,000	
October 28	Dartmouth	Harvard Stadium; Boston, MA (rivalry)	W 21–15	32,500	
November 4	at Penn	Franklin Field; Philadelphia, PA (rivalry)	W 37–6	15,345	
November 11	Princeton	Harvard Stadium; Boston, MA (rivalry)	W 9–7	30,000	
November 18	Brown	Harvard Stadium; Boston, MA	W 21–6	10,000	
November 25	at Yale	Yale Bowl; New Haven, CT (The Game)	W 27–0	61,789	
*Non-conference game

== Statistics ==
The 1961 Crimson gained an average of 215.3 rushing yards and 32.7 passing yards per game. On defense, they held opponents to 152.2 rushing yards and 78.7 passing yards per game.

In their run-oriented offense, Harvard had eight players who rushed for at least 100 yards. Bill Grana led the group with 431 yards on 94 carries for a 4.6-yard average. He was followed by Bill Taylor (350 yards, 79 carries, 4.4-yard average), Ted Halaby (288 yards, 51 carries, 5.6-yard average), Mike Bassett (174 yards, 44 carries, 4.0-yard average), and Chuck Reed (169 yards, 42 carries, 4.0-yard average).

The team's passing leaders were Bill Humenuk (13-for-31, 195 yards) and Mike Bassett (13-for-40, 125 yards). The leading receivers were Pete Hart (five receptions, 64 yards) and Bill Taylor (seven receptions, 58 yards).

== Awards and honors ==
Three Harvard players received first-team honors on the 1961 All All-Ivy football team: end Bob Boyds; tackle Darwin Wile; and guard Bill Swinford.

== Players ==
- Mike Bassett, quarterback, sophomore, 5'11", 175 pounds
- Tom Boone, halfback, junior, 6'0", 190 pounds
- Bob Boyds (#82), end, senior, 6'1", 203 pounds, Carnegie, PA
- Tom Gaston (#65), guard, senior, 6'1", 205 pounds
- Bill Grana, fullback, sophomore, 5'11", 195 pounds, St. Louis, MO
- Ted Halaby, quarterback, senior, 5'10", 175 pounds, Rochester, NY
- Alex W. "Pete" Hart, end and captain, senior, 6'2", 215 pounds
- Bill Humenuk, quarterback, sophomore, 6'2", 185 pounds, Philadelphia, PA
- Chuck Reed, halfback
- Mike Sheridan, tackle
- Ed Smith (#78), tackle, 6'3", 215 pounds
- Bill Swinford (#61), guard, senior, 5'10", 180 pounds, Oklahoma City
- Bill Taylor, halfback, junior, 6'0", 190 pounds
- Tony Watters, center, senior, 6'2", 195 pounds
- Darwin Wile (#76), tackle, senior, 6'0", 215 pounds, Middletown, PA
