= Chief Boston =

American football player and coach (1917–2002)

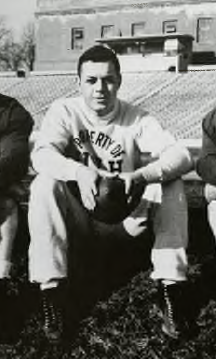
- Boston in The Granite yearbook of New Hampshire, during the 1949 season

Biographical details
- Born: April 13, 1917; Providence, Rhode Island, U.S.
- Died: May 4, 2002 (aged 85); Nashville, Indiana, U.S.
- Education: Harvard (1939)

Playing career
- 1936–1938: Harvard
- Positions: Quarterback, (Note: During the era that Boston played, the quarterback position was a "blocking back".) kicker

Coaching career (HC unless noted)
- 1939: University School (OH)
- 1940–1941: Harvard (freshmen)
- 1946–1947: Harvard (JV)
- 1948: Army (backfield)
- 1949–1964: New Hampshire

Head coaching record
- Overall: 60–57–10

Accomplishments and honors

Championships
- 4 Yankee Conference (1950, 1953, 1954, 1962)

Clarence Elijah "Chief" Boston (April 13, 1917 – May 4, 2002) was an American football player, college football coach—most notably at the University of New Hampshire—and United States Army officer.

== Early years ==
Boston was born in Providence, Rhode Island, graduated from Moses Brown School there, and attended Harvard. His father, a newspaper reporter, was also nicknamed "Chief", as his father had been the chief of police in Woonsocket, Rhode Island. At Harvard, Boston competed in wrestling, baseball, and football. He was a champion wrestler, and graduated from Harvard in 1939.

== Coaching career ==
Boston coached high school football at University School near Cleveland, before returning to Harvard in 1940 as coach of the freshman football team. After coaching football for two seasons, and also coaching wrestling, Boston entered the United States Army in February 1942. Boston served in the Third Army, commanded by George S. Patton, and received a Bronze Star and the Legion of Merit, while rising to the rank of major. Boston returned to Harvard in 1946, coaching the junior varsity football team and wrestling. In May 1948, he was named as backfield coach for Army, under head coach Earl Blaik.

In March 1949, Boston was named head coach of the New Hampshire Wildcats, succeeding Bill Glassford, who had resigned to coach Nebraska. Boston coached the Wildcats from 1949 to 1964, compiling a record of 60–57–10. During his 16 seasons with New Hampshire, the Wildcats won four Yankee Conference titles, and in 1962, he was named New England small college coach of the year by the Boston Football Writers Association. He resigned in January 1965, after the team had gone a combined 3–12–1 during the 1963 and 1964 seasons.

== Personal life ==
Boston was inducted to the Harvard Varsity Club hall of fame in 1971, and the University of New Hampshire athletic hall of fame in 1995. He remained active in the Army Reserve, holding the rank of lieutenant colonel in the 1960s while serving as executive officer of the 304th Infantry Regiment based in Portsmouth, New Hampshire. Boston and his wife, Mary, had two daughters and a son. Boston died in May 2002 at his home in Nashville, Indiana, and was buried at Greenlawn Cemetery there.

== Head coaching record ==
Year	Team	Overall	Conference	Standing	Bowl/playoffs
New Hampshire Wildcats (Yankee Conference) (1949–1964)
1949	New Hampshire	4–4	1–3	5th	
1950	New Hampshire	8–0	4–0	1st	
1951	New Hampshire	5–2–1	1–2–1	4th	
1952	New Hampshire	3–4–1	0–4	6th	
1953	New Hampshire	6–2	3–1	T–1st	
1954	New Hampshire	7–1	4–0	1st	
1955	New Hampshire	2–4–2	1–1–2	T–3rd	
1956	New Hampshire	3–4–1	2–1–1	3rd	
1957	New Hampshire	0–7–1	0–3–1	6th	
1958	New Hampshire	2–6	0–4	6th	
1959	New Hampshire	3–3–2	1–2–1	T–4th	
1960	New Hampshire	4–3	2–2	4th	
1961	New Hampshire	3–5	1–3	4th	
1962	New Hampshire	7–0–1	4–0–1	1st	
1963	New Hampshire	2–6	2–3	3rd	
1964	New Hampshire	1–6–1	0–4–1	6th	
New Hampshire:		60–57–10	26–33–8		
Total:		60–57–10			
National championship Conference title Conference division title or championship game berth
