= Vic Fusia =

American football player and coach (1913–1991)

Biographical details
- Born: November 13, 1913; Wilkinsburg, Pennsylvania, U.S.
- Died: January 18, 1991 (aged 77); Amherst, Massachusetts, U.S.

Playing career
- 1934–1937: Manhattan
- 1942: Jacksonville NAS
- Position: Halfback

Coaching career (HC unless noted)
- 1948–1950: Indiana HS (PA)
- 1951–1954: Brown (backfield)
- 1955–1960: Pittsburgh (backfield)
- 1961–1970: UMass

Head coaching record
- Overall: 59–32–2 (college)
- Bowls: 0–1

Accomplishments and honors

Championships
- 5 Yankee (1963–1964, 1966–1967, 1969)

Awards
- New England Coach of the Year (1964)

Victor H. Fusia (November 13, 1913 – January 18, 1991) was an American football player and coach. He served as the head coach at the University of Massachusetts Amherst from 1961 to 1970. He compiled a 59–32–2 overall record and won five Yankee Conference championships.

Born in Wilkinsburg, Pennsylvania, Fusia was a 1938 graduate of Manhattan College and a Navy veteran of World War II. He coached five years in the Pennsylvania high school system in the 1950s and was an assistant coach at Brown and the Pittsburgh before becoming the head coach at Massachusetts. He resigned after the 1970 season to become the school's staff associate in charge of sports promotion. He remained with the school until his retirement in 1982. Fusia died of a heart attack on January 18, 1991.

== Head coaching record ==
=== College ===
Year	Team	Overall	Conference	Standing	Bowl/playoffs
UMass Redmen (Yankee Conference) (1961–1970)
1961	UMass	5–4	3–1	2nd	
1962	UMass	6–3	4–1	2nd	
1963	UMass	8–0–1	5–0	1st	
1964	UMass	8–2	5–0	1st	L Tangerine
1965	UMass	7–2	4–1	2nd	
1966	UMass	6–3	5–0	1st	
1967	UMass	7–2	5–0	1st	
1968	UMass	2–8	2–3	T–3rd	
1969	UMass	6–3	5–0	1st	
1970	UMass	4–5–1	3–1–1	2nd	
UMass:		59–32–2	41–7–1		
Total:		59–32–2			
National championship Conference title Conference division title or championship game berth
