= 1962 New Hampshire Wildcats football team =

American college football season

1962 New Hampshire Wildcats football

Yankee Conference champion
- Conference: Yankee Conference
- Record: 7–0–1 (4–0–1 Yankee)
- Head coach: Chief Boston (14th season)
- Home stadium: Cowell Stadium

1962 Yankee Conference football standings
| | Conf. | | | | | Overall |
| Team | W | | L | | T | W | | L | | T |
|---|---|---|---|---|---|---|---|---|---|---|
| New Hampshire $ | 4 | – | 0 | – | 1 | 7 | – | 0 | – | 1 |
| UMass | 4 | – | 1 | – | 0 | 6 | – | 3 | – | 0 |
| Connecticut | 2 | – | 2 | – | 0 | 3 | – | 6 | – | 0 |
| Rhode Island | 1 | – | 3 | – | 1 | 2 | – | 5 | – | 2 |
| Vermont | 1 | – | 3 | – | 0 | 3 | – | 5 | – | 0 |
| Maine | 1 | – | 4 | – | 0 | 4 | – | 4 | – | 0 |
$ – Conference champion

The 1962 New Hampshire Wildcats football team was an American football team that represented the University of New Hampshire as a member of the Yankee Conference during the 1962 NCAA College Division football season. In their 14th year under head coach Chief Boston, the Wildcats compiled a 7–0–1 record (4–0–1 in conference games), won the Yankee Conference championship, and outscored opponents by a total of 100 to 46. The team's only setback was a 6–6 tie with Rhode Island.

The team was led by its defensive play, giving up only 5.7 points, 84.6 rushing yards, and 52.8 passing yards per game. On offense, they tallied 989 rushing yards (123.6 yards per game) and 726 passing yards (90.8 yards per game). The team's leaders on offense include:

- Quarterback Lloyd Wells completed 47 of 85 passes for 726 yards and six touchdowns. He was selected by the Associated Press as the quarterback on the 1962 AP Little All New England football team.
- Halfback Dan Serieka led the team in rushing (288 yards on 73 carries), receiving (14 receptions, 293 yards), scoring (30 points), and punting (45 punts, 1,524 yards, 33.9-yards average).

The team played its home games at Cowell Stadium in Durham, New Hampshire.

== Schedule ==
| Date | Opponent | Site | Result | Attendance | Source |
|---|---|---|---|---|---|
| September 29 | at Colby* | Waterville, ME | W 18–14 | < 2,000 - 3,000 | |
| October 6 | Rhode Island | Cowell Stadium; Durham, NH | T 6–6 | 1,000–5,000 | |
| October 13 | at Maine | Orono, ME (Battle for the Brice–Cowell Musket) | W 21–6 | 7,000 | |
| October 20 | Vermont^{†} | Cowell Stadium; Durham, NH | W 19–6 | 7,000–8,000 | |
| October 27 | at Northeastern* | Northeastern University Field; Brookline, MA | W 6–0 | 5,400 | |
| November 3 | Connecticut | Cowell Stadium; Durham, NH | W 7–0 | 3,500 | |
| November 10 | Springfield* | Cowell Stadium; Durham, NH | W 7–0 | 1,000 | |
| November 17 | at UMass | Alumni Field; Amherst, MA (rivalry) | W 16–14 | 8,557 | |
*Non-conference game; ^{†}Homecoming
