= 1951 New Hampshire Wildcats football team =

American college football season

1951 New Hampshire Wildcats football
- Conference: Yankee Conference
- Record: 5–2–1 (1–2–1 Yankee)
- Head coach: Chief Boston (3rd season)
- Home stadium: Lewis Field

1951 Yankee Conference football standings
	Conf.					Overall
Team	W		L		T	W		L		T
Maine $	3	–	0	–	1	6	–	0	–	1
UMass	2	–	0	–	0	3	–	4	–	1
Connecticut	2	–	1	–	0	4	–	4	–	0
New Hampshire	1	–	2	–	1	5	–	2	–	1
Rhode Island	1	–	3	–	0	3	–	5	–	0
Vermont	0	–	3	–	0	0	–	7	–	0
$ – Conference champion

The 1951 New Hampshire Wildcats football team was an American football team that represented the University of New Hampshire as a member of the Yankee Conference during the 1951 college football season. In its third year under head coach Chief Boston, the team compiled a 5–2–1 record (1–2–1 against conference opponents) and finished fourth out of six teams in the Yankee Conference.

== Schedule ==
Date	Opponent	Site	Result	Attendance	Source
September 29	at Brandeis*	Brandeis Stadium; Waltham, MA	W 33–20	4,500	
October 6	at Rhode Island	Meade Stadium; Kingston, RI	L 0–27		
October 13	Maine	Lewis Field; Durham, NH (Battle for the Brice–Cowell Musket)	T 0–0		
October 20	at Springfield*	Springfield, MA	W 20–7		
October 27	Vermont	Lewis Field; Durham, NH	W 54–6	6,500	
November 3	at Connecticut	Gardner Dow Athletic Fields; Storrs, CT	L 0–20		
November 10	Tufts*	Lewis Field; Durham, NH	W 60–0		
November 17	at Kent State*	Memorial Stadium; Kent, OH	W 7–0	1,000	
*Non-conference game
