= 1961 Vermont Catamounts football team =

American college football season

1961 Vermont Catamounts football
- Conference: Yankee Conference
- Record: 3–3–1 (0–2 Yankee)
- Head coach: J. Edward Donnelly (10th season)
- Home stadium: Centennial Field

1961 Yankee Conference football standings
	Conf.					Overall
Team	W		L		T	W		L		T
Maine $	5	–	0	–	0	8	–	0	–	1
UMass	3	–	1	–	0	5	–	4	–	0
Connecticut	2	–	2	–	0	2	–	7	–	0
New Hampshire	1	–	3	–	0	3	–	5	–	0
Rhode Island	1	–	4	–	0	2	–	6	–	1
Vermont	0	–	2	–	0	3	–	3	–	1
$ – Conference champion

The 1961 Vermont Catamounts football team was an American football team that represented the University of Vermont in the Yankee Conference during the 1961 college football season. In their tenth year under head coach J. Edward Donnelly, the team compiled a 3–3–1 record.

== Schedule ==
Date	Opponent	Site	Result	Attendance	Source
September 30	Coast Guard*	Centennial Field; Burlington, VT	W 28–8	4,800	
October 7	at Maine	Alumni Field; Orono, ME	L 14–34	4,600–5,000	
October 14	Rhode Island	Centennial Field; Burlington, VT	L 6–18	3,500–3,800	
October 21	Rochester*	Centennial Field; Burlington, VT	W 18–0	6,500–8,000	
October 28	Norwich*	Centennial Field; Burlington, VT	T 6–6	6,500–8,000	
November 4	at Northeastern*	Kent Street Field; Brookline, MA	W 6–0	7,000–7,300	
November 11	at Middlebury*	Porter Field; Middlebury, VT	L 6–27	3,200–4,500	
*Non-conference game
