= 1961 Penn Quakers football team =

American college football season

1961 Penn Quakers football
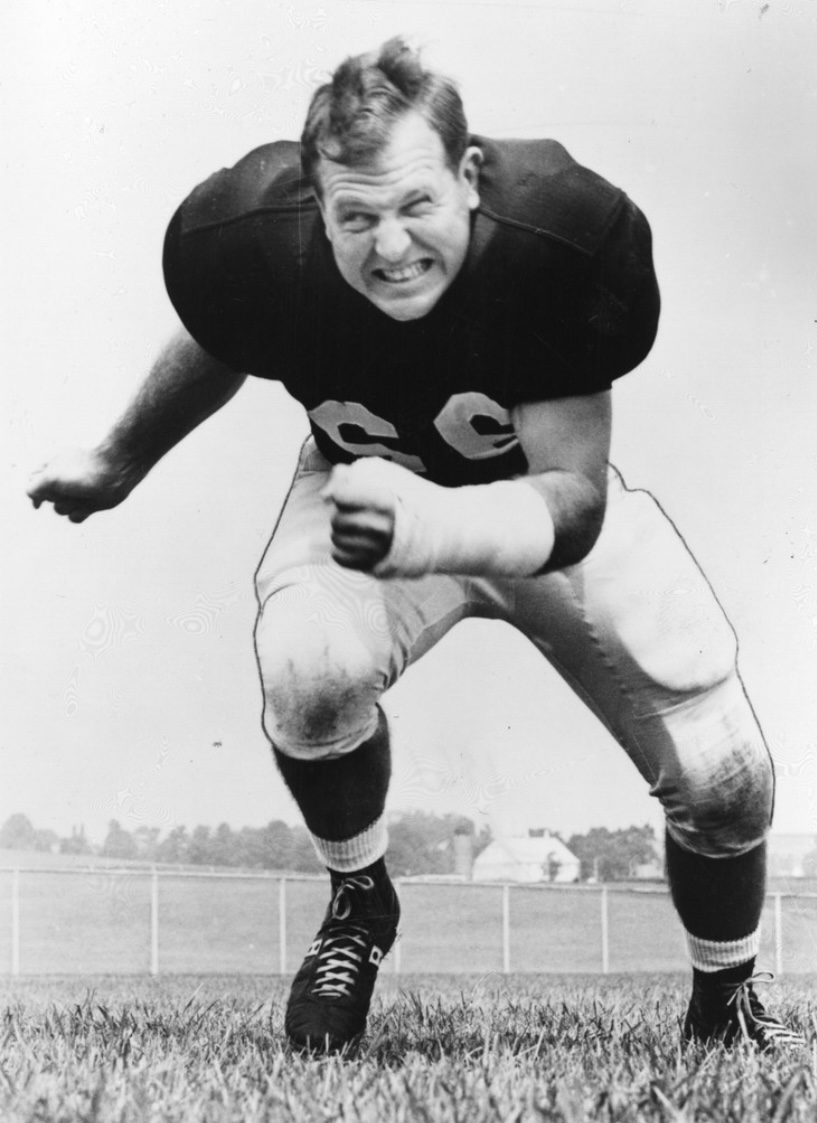
- Team captain Mike Natale
- Conference: Ivy League
- Record: 2–7 (1–6 Ivy)
- Head coach: John Stiegman (2nd season)
- Captain: Mike Natale
- Home stadium: Franklin Field

1961 Ivy League football standings
	Conf.					Overall
Team	W		L		T	W		L		T
Columbia +	6	–	1	–	0	6	–	3	–	0
Harvard +	6	–	1	–	0	6	–	3	–	0
Dartmouth	5	–	2	–	0	6	–	3	–	0
Princeton	5	–	2	–	0	5	–	4	–	0
Yale	3	–	4	–	0	4	–	5	–	0
Cornell	2	–	5	–	0	3	–	6	–	0
Penn	1	–	6	–	0	2	–	7	–	0
Brown	0	–	7	–	0	0	–	9	–	0
+ – Conference co-champions

The 1961 Penn Quakers football team was an American football team that represented the University of Pennsylvania as a member of the Ivy League during the 1961 college football season. In their second year under head coach John Stiegman, the Quakers compiled a 2–7 record (1–6 in conference games), finished in seventh place out of eight teams in the Ivy League, and were outscored by a total of 194 to 42 (167 to 22 in Ivy League games).

Guard Mike Natale was the team captain. The team's statistical leaders included tailback John Owens (294 rushing yards), quarterback Bill Gray (150 passing yards), and end Ron Allshouse (125 receiving yards).

The team played its home games at Franklin Field adjacent to the university's campus in Philadelphia.

== Schedule ==
Date	Opponent	Site	Result	Attendance	Source
September 30	Lafayette*	Franklin Field; Philadelphia, PA	W 14–7	14,411	
October 7	Dartmouth	Franklin Field; Philadelphia, PA	L 0–30	12,596	
October 14	at Princeton	Palmer Stadium; Princeton, NJ (rivalry)	L 3–9	22,000	
October 21	Brown	Franklin Field; Philadelphia, PA	W 7–0	6,867	
October 28	Rutgers*	Franklin Field; Philadelphia, PA	L 6–20	14,996	
November 4	Harvard	Franklin Field; Philadelphia, PA (rivalry)	L 6–37	15,345	
November 11	Yale	Franklin Field; Philadelphia, PA	L 0–23	14,093	
November 18	at Columbia	Baker Field; New York, NY	L 6–37	17,066	
November 25	Cornell	Franklin Field; Philadelphia, PA (rivalry)	L 0–31	12,204	
*Non-conference game
