= 1962 UMass Redmen football team =

American college football season

1962 UMass Redmen football
- Conference: Yankee Conference
- Record: 6–3 (4–1 Yankee)
- Head coach: Vic Fusia (2nd season)
- Home stadium: Alumni Field

1962 Yankee Conference football standings
	Conf.					Overall
Team	W		L		T	W		L		T
New Hampshire $	4	–	0	–	1	7	–	0	–	1
UMass	4	–	1	–	0	6	–	3	–	0
Connecticut	2	–	2	–	0	3	–	6	–	0
Rhode Island	1	–	3	–	1	2	–	5	–	2
Vermont	1	–	3	–	0	3	–	5	–	0
Maine	1	–	4	–	0	4	–	4	–	0
$ – Conference champion

The 1962 UMass Redmen football team represented the University of Massachusetts Amherst in the 1962 NCAA College Division football season as a member of the Yankee Conference. The team was coached by Vic Fusia and played its home games at Alumni Field in Amherst, Massachusetts. UMass finished the season with a record of 6–3 overall and 4–1 in conference play.

== Schedule ==
Date	Opponent	Site	Result	Attendance	Source
September 22	Maine	Alumni Field; Amherst, MA	W 10–0	7,000–7,058	
September 29	at Dartmouth*	Memorial Field; Hanover, NH	L 3–27	8,500	
October 6	at Bucknell*	Memorial Stadium; Lewisburg, PA	W 21–20	6,000–8,000	
October 13	Connecticut	Alumni Field; Amherst, MA (rivalry)	W 16–6	10,075	
October 20	at Rhode Island	Meade Stadium; Kingston, RI	W 42–8	7,440–7,500	
October 27	Boston University*	Alumni Field; Amherst, MA	L 6–20	7,656	
November 3	at Vermont	Centennial Field; Burlington, VT	W 34–6	6,500	
November 10	at Villanova*	Villanova Stadium; Philadelphia, PA	W 19–18	8,000	
November 17	New Hampshire	Alumni Field; Amherst, MA (rivalry)	L 14–16	8,557	
*Non-conference game
