= Arthur Valpey =

American football player and coach (1915–2007)

- Valpey from 1935 Michigan team photograph

Biographical details
- Born: August 5, 1915; Dayton, Ohio, U.S.
- Died: March 12, 2007 (aged 91)

Playing career
- 1935–1937: Michigan
- Position: End

Coaching career (HC unless noted)
- 1940–1942: Midland HS (MI)
- 1943–1947: Michigan (assistant)
- 1948–1949: Harvard
- 1950–1951: Connecticut

Head coaching record
- Overall: 12–21 (college)

Arthur Ludgate Valpey Jr. (August 5, 1915 – March 12, 2007) was an American football player and coach. He served as the head football coach at Harvard University from 1948 to 1949 and at the University of Connecticut from 1950 to 1951, compiling a career college football coach record of 12–21. Valpey played college football at the University of Michigan.

== Playing career ==
A native of Dayton, Ohio, Valpey was an all-state halfback at Steele High School. Valpey enrolled at the University of Michigan in 1934, where freshman football coach Wally Weber moved him to the end position. Valpey played end for the 1935, 1936 and 1937 Michigan Wolverines football teams coached by Harry Kipke.

== Coaching career ==
After graduating, Valpey became a high school football coach for five years, working for one year each in Ida, Michigan, and Manchester, Michigan, and eventually at Midland, Michigan. He was next hired in April 1940 to serve as the head football coach and athletic director at Midland High School, where he remained for three years. Valpey was hired as the freshman line coach at the University of Michigan at the end of the 1942 season and was on the school's coaching staff from 1943 through 1947. In 1945 and 1946, Valpey became the chief scout and line coach under Michigan's legendary coach Fritz Crisler. In 1947, Valpey served as the ends coach for the undefeated Michigan team that is considered the greatest football team in the school's history. Under Valpey's tutelage, both of Michigan's starting ends Bob Mann and Len Ford were selected as second- and third-team All-Americans for the 1947 season.

In February 1948, Valpey was hired by Harvard University as its head football coach, succeeding retiring coach Dick Harlow. Valpey won his first game as the head coach at Harvard, becoming the last Harvard coach to accomplish that feat until 1994. Valpey was Harvard's football coach in 1948 and 1949. In his first season, Harvard's football team had a 4–4 record, but in his second season as coach, the team compiled a 1–9 record, reported at the time to be "the worst season in the history of Harvard football." Despite the team's poor record in 1949, Valpey became a popular member of the Harvard community. When Valpey announced in February 1950 that he had accepted the head coaching job at the University of Connecticut, The Harvard Crimson wrote the following about Valpey:

"There was every reason for him to go to Connectient: his contract was due to run out next fall, he was faced with a schedule which is sure to produce few victories; and in that situation, the Provost could not be expected to guarantee a contract renewal at this early date. Valpey, being young, has to think of the future. All these considerations made the decision clear. But Harvard will not only be losing a coach who has a keen eye for his professional future. Art Valpey has managed to build up, through a fairly dismal two year period, a respect and affection in associates that has been remarkable."

When he left Harvard, Valpey still had a year remaining on his contract, and told the press that Harvard had given him permission to negotiate for a new job, though he had also been told he could remain at Harvard for the 1950 season.

Valpey was the head football coach at the University of Connecticut in the 1950 and 1951 seasons, compiling records of 3–5 in 1950 and 4–4 in 1951.

In July 1952, Valpey was replaced as Connecticut's head coach with Robert Ingalls. Valpay told reporters at the time that he intended to go into private business.

== Later life ==
Valpey worked for the Arab American Oil Company (ARAMCO) from 1952 until 1969, when he retired from his position as a company representative in Ras Tanura in eastern Saudi Arabia.

Valpey died in March 2007 at age 91. His last residence was at Boothbay Harbor, Maine.

== Head coaching record ==
=== College ===
Year	Team	Overall	Conference	Standing	Bowl/playoffs
Harvard Crimson (Independent) (1948–1949)
1948	Harvard	4–4			
1949	Harvard	1–8			
Harvard:		5–12			
Connecticut Huskies (Yankee Conference) (1950–1951)
1950	Connecticut	3–5	0–3	T–5th	
1951	Connecticut	4–4	2–1	3rd	
Connecticut:		7–9	2–4		
Total:		12–21			
