= 1965 Rhode Island Rams football team =

American college football season

1965 Rhode Island Rams football
- Conference: Yankee Conference
- Record: 2–7 (1–4 Yankee)
- Head coach: Jack Zilly (3rd season)
- Home stadium: Meade Stadium

1965 Yankee Conference football standings
	Conf.					Overall
Team	W		L		T	W		L		T
Maine $	5	–	0	–	0	8	–	2	–	0
UMass	4	–	1	–	0	7	–	2	–	0
Vermont	2	–	2	–	0	6	–	2	–	0
Connecticut	2	–	2	–	0	3	–	6	–	0
Rhode Island	1	–	4	–	0	2	–	7	–	0
New Hampshire	0	–	5	–	0	0	–	8	–	0
$ – Conference champion

The 1965 Rhode Island Rams football team was an American football team that represented the University of Rhode Island as a member of the Yankee Conference during the 1965 NCAA College Division football season. In its third season under head coach Jack Zilly, the team compiled a 2–7 record (1–4 against conference opponents), finished in fifth place out of six teams in the Yankee Conference, and was outscored by a total of 181 to 52. The team played its home games at Meade Stadium in Kingston, Rhode Island.

== Schedule ==
Date	Opponent	Site	Result	Attendance	Source
September 25	at Brown*	Brown Stadium; Providence, RI (rivalry)	W 14–6	8,300	
October 2	New Hampshire	Meade Stadium; Kingston, RI	W 23–6	7,300–7,413	
October 9	at Vermont	Centennial Field; Burlington, VT	L 6–26	7,000	
October 16	at UMass	Alumni Field; Amherst, MA	L 0–30	16,100	
October 23	No. 3 Maine	Meade Stadium; Kingston, RI	L 0–36	10,000–10,669	
October 30	Springfield*	Meade Stadium; Kingston, RI	L 6–7	4,000	
November 6	at Temple*	Temple Stadium; Philadelphia, PA	L 0–28	5,500	
November 13	Connecticut	Meade Stadium; Kingston, RI (rivalry)	L 0–14	3,200	
November 20	at Boston University*	Nickerson Field; Boston, MA	L 3–28	8,000	
*Non-conference game; Rankings from AP Poll released prior to the game
