= 1965 Vermont Catamounts football team =

American college football season

1965 Vermont Catamounts football
- Conference: Yankee Conference
- Record: 6–2 (2–2 Yankee)
- Head coach: Bob Clifford (4th season)
- Home stadium: Centennial Field

1965 Yankee Conference football standings
	Conf.					Overall
Team	W		L		T	W		L		T
Maine $	5	–	0	–	0	8	–	2	–	0
UMass	4	–	1	–	0	7	–	2	–	0
Vermont	2	–	2	–	0	6	–	2	–	0
Connecticut	2	–	2	–	0	3	–	6	–	0
Rhode Island	1	–	4	–	0	2	–	7	–	0
New Hampshire	0	–	5	–	0	0	–	8	–	0
$ – Conference champion

The 1965 Vermont Catamounts football team was an American football team that represented the University of Vermont in the Yankee Conference during the 1965 NCAA College Division football season. In their fourth year under head coach Bob Clifford, the team compiled a 6–2 record.

== Schedule ==
Date	Opponent	Site	Result	Attendance	Source
September 18	at American International*	AIC Park; Springfield, MA	W 42–19	1,500–3,000	
September 25	WPI*	Centennial Field; Burlington, VT	W 42–0	6,000	
October 2	at Maine	Alumni Field; Orono, ME	L 6–35	6,900–7,900	
October 9	Rhode Island^{†}	Centennial Field; Burlington, VT	W 26–6	7,000	
October 16	New Hampshire	Centennial Field; Burlington, VT	W 23–7	5,000	
October 23	Norwich*	Centennial Field; Burlington, VT	W 7–6	5,500	
October 30	at UMass	Alumni Stadium; Hadley, MA	L 6–41	8,400	
November 6	at Middlebury*	Porter Field; Middlebury, VT	W 7–0	4,500	
*Non-conference game; ^{†}Homecoming
