= 1961 Cornell Big Red football team =

American college football season

1961 Cornell Big Red football
- Conference: Ivy League
- Record: 3–6 (2–5 Ivy)
- Head coach: Tom Harp (1st season)
- Captains: Dave McKelvey; George Telesh
- Home stadium: Schoellkopf Field

1961 Ivy League football standings
	Conf.					Overall
Team	W		L		T	W		L		T
Columbia +	6	–	1	–	0	6	–	3	–	0
Harvard +	6	–	1	–	0	6	–	3	–	0
Dartmouth	5	–	2	–	0	6	–	3	–	0
Princeton	5	–	2	–	0	5	–	4	–	0
Yale	3	–	4	–	0	4	–	5	–	0
Cornell	2	–	5	–	0	3	–	6	–	0
Penn	1	–	6	–	0	2	–	7	–	0
Brown	0	–	7	–	0	0	–	9	–	0
+ – Conference co-champions

The 1961 Cornell Big Red football team was an American football team that represented Cornell University as a member of the Ivy League during the 1961 college football season. In its first season under head coach Tom Harp, the team compiled a 3–6 record (2–5 in conference games), finished in sixth place in the Ivy League, and outscored opponents by a total of 143 to 137 (102 to 106 in conference games). Dave McKelvey and George Telesh were the team captains.

Quarterback Gary Wood led the team in passing (456 yards), rushing (449 yards), and total offense (905 yards).

Cornell played its home games at Schoellkopf Field in Ithaca, New York.

== Schedule ==
Date	Opponent	Site	Result	Attendance	Source
September 30	Colgate*	Schoellkopf Field; Ithaca, NY (rivalry)	W 34–0	20,000	
October 7	at Harvard	Harvard Stadium; Boston, MA	L 0–14	11,000	
October 14	Navy*	Schoellkopf Field; Ithaca, NY	L 7–31	22,000	
October 21	Yale	Schoellkopf Field; Ithaca, NY	L 0–12	20,000	
October 28	at Princeton	Palmer Stadium; Princeton, NJ	L 25–30	28,000	
November 4	Columbia	Schoellkopf Field; Ithaca, NY (rivalry)	L 7–35	8,000	
November 11	Brown	Schoellkopf Field; Ithaca, NY	W 25–0	8,000	
November 18	at Dartmouth	Memorial Field; Hanover, NH (rivalry)	L 14–15	11,000	
November 25	at Penn	Franklin Field; Philadelphia, PA (rivalry)	W 31–0	12,204	
*Non-conference game

== Statistics ==
Cornell gained an average of 193.1 rushing yards and 67.0 passing yards per game. On defense, they gave up an average of 192.2 rushing yards and 46.5 passing yards per game.

Quarterback Gary Wood led the team in multiple categories. He completed 28 of 75 passes (37.3%) for 456 yards with six touchdowns, three interceptions, and a 106.8 quarterback rating. He also led the team in rushing, gaining 449 yards on 94 carries (4.8-yard average) with touchdowns.

Ken Hoffman was the team's leading receiver with 10 catches for 159 passing yards, an average of 25.0 yards per catch.

Other significant contributors included Jim Lampkins (293 rushing yards, 98 receiving yards); George Telesh (224 rushing yards, 30 receiving yards), Tony Pascal (165 rushing yards), Bob Palmisciano (158 rushing yards), and Al Aragona (87 rushing yards, 100 receiving yards).

== Awards and honors ==
Quarterback Gary Wood was selected as a first-team player on the 1961 All-Ivy League football team. Guard Dave Thomas and back George Telesh were named to the second team. End Ken Hoffman and guard Carmine DiGiacomo received honorable mention.
