= 1962 Rhode Island Rams football team =

American college football season

1962 Rhode Island Rams football
- Conference: Yankee Conference
- Record: 2–5–2 (1–3–1 Yankee)
- Head coach: John Chironna (2nd season)
- Home stadium: Meade Stadium

1962 Yankee Conference football standings
	Conf.					Overall
Team	W		L		T	W		L		T
New Hampshire $	4	–	0	–	1	7	–	0	–	1
UMass	4	–	1	–	0	6	–	3	–	0
Connecticut	2	–	2	–	0	3	–	6	–	0
Rhode Island	1	–	3	–	1	2	–	5	–	2
Vermont	1	–	3	–	0	3	–	5	–	0
Maine	1	–	4	–	0	4	–	4	–	0
$ – Conference champion

The 1962 Rhode Island Rams football team was an American football team that represented the University of Rhode Island as a member of the Yankee Conference during the 1962 NCAA College Division football season. In its second and final season under head coach John Chironna, the team compiled a 2–5–2 record (1–3–1 against conference opponents), finished in fourth place out of six teams in the Yankee Conference, and was outscored by a total of 176 to 84. The team played its home games at Meade Stadium in Kingston, Rhode Island.

== Schedule ==
Date	Opponent	Site	Result	Attendance	Source
September 22	Northeastern*	Meade Stadium; Kingston, RI	L 0–28	4,500	
September 29	at Maine	Alumni Field; Orono, ME	W 14–7	1,000–5,000	
October 6	at New Hampshire	Cowell Stadium; Durham, NH	T 6–6	5,000	
October 13	Vermont	Meade Stadium; Kingston, RI	L 12–21	4,000	
October 20	UMass	Meade Stadium; Kingston, RI	L 8–42	7,440–7,500	
October 27	at Brown*	Brown Stadium; Providence, RI (rivalry)	T 12–12	10,000–12,000	
November 3	at Springfield*	Springfield, MA	W 24–13	1,000	
November 10	Hofstra*	Meade Stadium; Kingston, RI	L 8–20	1,000–3,500	
November 17	at Connecticut	Memorial Stadium; Storrs, CT (rivalry)	L 0–27	9,540–10,000	
*Non-conference game
