= 1965 Tangerine Bowl =

American college football game

Maine Black Bears	East Carolina Pirates
(8–1)	(8–1)
Yankee Conference	Southern Conference
0	31
Head coach: Harold Westerman	Head coach: Clarence Stasavich
	1	2	3	4	Total
Maine	0	0	0	0	0
East Carolina	0	10	14	7	31
- Date: December 11, 1965
- Season: 1965
- Stadium: Tangerine Bowl
- Location: Orlando, Florida
- MVP: Dave Alexander
- Attendance: 8,350

The 1965 Tangerine Bowl was a postseason college football bowl game between the Maine Black Bears and the East Carolina Pirates.

== Background ==
The Pirates were champion of the Southern Conference in their first year of play after years of independence. The Black Bears were the champion of the Yankee Conference since 1961. The game was one of four regional finals in the College Division, the predecessor of Division II; the other three postseason games were the Pecan, Grantland Rice, and Camellia bowls, also played on December 11.

== Game summary ==
Dick DeVarney went down early in the game with both a leg injury and a separated shoulder, hurting the chances of the Black Bears. Pete Kriz gave the Pirates a lead on a 24-yard field goal in the second quarter. George Richardson threw a 35-yard touchdown pass to Jim Abernathy to increase the lead to 10 before halftime. The Pirates piled on in the third quarter with a touchdown run by fullback Dave Alexander, and a touchdown pass from him to Churchill Grimes (after an interception), which made it 24–0. Finally, Alexander ran for a 55-yard touchdown in the fourth quarter to put an exclamation point on the game and give the Pirates their third consecutive bowl victory. Alexander was named the game's MVP. It was East Carolina's second straight victory in the Tangerine Bowl, the College Division's Eastern regional final, and the Pirates' third straight 9–1 season.

== Aftermath ==
East Carolina moved up to the University Division for the next season but the Pirates did not play in a bowl game until 1978, in the Independence Bowl. The Black Bears did not win another conference title until 1974, sharing it with UMass. When the College Division was retired after the 1972 season, Maine went to Division II in 1973 and moved up to Division I FCS when it started in 1978 as Division I-AA.

== Statistics ==
Statistics	Maine	ECU
First downs	9	18
Yards rushing	66	171
Yards passing	86	184
Total yards	152	355
Punts-Average	8-38	5-40
Fumbles lost	2	3
Interceptions	4	1
Penalty yards	50	59
