= 1961 Yale Bulldogs football team =

American college football season

1961 Yale Bulldogs football
- Conference: Ivy League
- Record: 4–5 (3–4 Ivy)
- Head coach: Jordan Olivar (10th season)
- Captain: Paul Bursiek
- Home stadium: Yale Bowl

1961 Ivy League football standings
	Conf.					Overall
Team	W		L		T	W		L		T
Columbia +	6	–	1	–	0	6	–	3	–	0
Harvard +	6	–	1	–	0	6	–	3	–	0
Dartmouth	5	–	2	–	0	6	–	3	–	0
Princeton	5	–	2	–	0	5	–	4	–	0
Yale	3	–	4	–	0	4	–	5	–	0
Cornell	2	–	5	–	0	3	–	6	–	0
Penn	1	–	6	–	0	2	–	7	–	0
Brown	0	–	7	–	0	0	–	9	–	0
+ – Conference co-champions

The 1961 Yale Bulldogs football team was an American football team that represented Yale University as a member of the Ivy League during the 1961 college football season. In their tenth year under head coach Jordan Olivar, the Bulldogs compiled a 4–5 record (3–4 in conference games), finished in fifth place in the Ivy League, and were outscored by at total of 105 to 99.

The team included only one returning starter, guard Paul Bursiek, from the undefeated 1960 team that won the Ivy League championship. Yale's statistical leaders for 1961 included fullback Dick Niglio with 330 rushing yards, quarterback Bill Leckonby with 411 passing yards, and halfback Randy Egloff with 133 receiving yards.

Center Matt Black was selected as the first-team center on the 1961 All-Ivy League football team. Guard Paul Bursiek was named to the second team.

The team played its home games at the Yale Bowl in New Haven, Connecticut.

== Schedule ==
Date	Opponent	Site	Result	Attendance	Source
September 30	Connecticut*	Yale Bowl; New Haven, CT	W 18–0	34,786	
October 7	Brown	Yale Bowl; New Haven, CT	W 14–3	23,605	
October 14	Columbia	Yale Bowl; New Haven, CT	L 0–11	22,188	
October 21	at Cornell	Schoellkopf Field; Ithaca, NY	W 12–0	20,000	
October 28	Colgate*	Yale Bowl; New Haven, CT	L 8–14	32,936	
November 4	Dartmouth	Yale Bowl; New Haven, CT	L 8–24	41,974	
November 11	at Penn	Franklin Field; Philadelphia, PA	W 23–0	14,093	
November 18	at Princeton	Palmer Stadium; Princeton, NJ (rivalry)	L 16–26	42,000	
November 25	Harvard	Yale Bowl; New Haven, CT (The Game)	L 0–27	61,789	
*Non-conference game

== Statistics ==
Quarterback Bill Leckonby was the team's leading passer. He completed 32 of 80 passes (40.0%) for 411 yards with three touchdowns, six interceptions, and an 80.5 quarterback rating. He also tallied 140 rushing yards for 551 yards of total offense. Leckonby was the son of long-time Lehigh head coach and athletic director Bill Leckonby.

Fullback Dick Niglio was the team's leading rusher. He tallied 330 yards on 91 carries for an average of 3.6 yards per carry. Ted Hard ranked second on the team with 306 rushing yards on 81 carries for a 3.8-yard average. Lee Marsh had 176 yards on 35 yards for 5.0 yards per carry.

Halback Randy Egloff was the team's leading receiver. He talied 10 catches for 133 yards, an average of 13.3 yards per reception.

== Players ==
- Matt Black, center, 185 pounds
- Jim Brewster, guard, 190 pounds
- Paul Bursiek, guard and captain, 185 pounds
- Jud Calkins, halfback
- Rudy Carpenter, end, 184 pounds
- Chris Clark, halfback, 170 pounds
- Wolf Dietrick, guard
- Randy Egloff, halfback
- Ted Hard, fullback, 185 pounds
- Henry Higdon, halfback, 165 pounds
- Lyn Hinojosa
- Erick Jensen, tackle
- Bill Leckonby, quarterback, senior, 185 pounds
- Lee Marsh, halfback
- Dave Mawicke, tackle, 220 pounds
- Dick Niglio, fullback
- Brian Rapp, quarterback, sophomore
- Stan Riveles, guard, junior
- Connie Shimer, end, 195 pounds
- Perry Wickstrom, tackle
- Dick Williams, tackle, 200 pounds
