= Harold Westerman =

American football and basketball coach

Biographical details
- Born: December 21, 1917; Ann Arbor, Michigan, U.S.
- Died: December 29, 2011 (aged 94); Orono, Maine, U.S.

Playing career

Basketball
- 1939–1941: Michigan
- 1945–1946: Michigan

Coaching career (HC unless noted)

Football
- 1946–1948: Hillsdale (assistant)
- 1949–1950: Maine (assistant)
- 1951–1966: Maine

Basketball
- 1946–1949: Hillsdale

Administrative career (AD unless noted)
- 1966–1982: Maine

Head coaching record
- Overall: 80–38–7 (football); 18–36 (basketball)
- Bowls: 0–1

Accomplishments and honors

Championships
- Football; 4 Yankee (1951–1952, 1961, 1965); 7 MIAA (1951, 1953–1955, 1961–1962, 1964)

Harold Scott Westerman (December 21, 1917 – December 29, 2011) was an American football and basketball coach and college athletic administrator. He served as the head football coach at the University of Maine from 1951 to 1966, compiling a record of 80–38–7 and winning four conference championships. Westerman was the head basketball coach at Hillsdale College from 1946 to 1949, tallying a mark of 18–36. He played college basketball for the University of Michigan.

== Head coaching record ==
=== Football ===
| Year | Team | Overall | Conference | Standing | Bowl/playoffs |
|---|---|---|---|---|---|
Maine Black Bears (Yankee Conference / Maine Intercollegiate Athletic Association) (1951–1964)
| 1951 | Maine | 6–0–1 | 3–0–1 / 3–0 | 1st / 1st | |
| 1952 | Maine | 4–3 | 3–1 / 1–2 | T–1st / | |
| 1953 | Maine | 4–2–1 | 1–2–1 / 3–0 | 4th / 1st | |
| 1954 | Maine | 5–2 | 2–2 / 3–0 | 3rd / 1st | |
| 1955 | Maine | 5–1–1 | 2–1–1 / 3–0 | 2nd / 1st | |
| 1956 | Maine | 5–2 | 3–1 / 2–1 | 2nd / | |
| 1957 | Maine | 4–3 | 2–2 / 2–1 | 3rd / | |
| 1958 | Maine | 6–2 | 3–1 / 2–1 | 2nd / | |
| 1959 | Maine | 3–3–2 | 1–2–2 / 2–1 | T–3rd / | |
| 1960 | Maine | 4–3–1 | 3–2 / 1–1–1 | 3rd / | |
| 1961 | Maine | 8–0–1 | 5–0 / 2–0–1 | 1st / T–1st | |
| 1962 | Maine | 4–4 | 1–4 / 3–0 | 6th / 1st | |
| 1963 | Maine | 5–3 | 3–2 / 2–1 | 2nd / | |
| 1964 | Maine | 5–3 | 2–3 / 3–0 | 4th / 1st | |
Maine Black Bears (Yankee Conference) (1965–1966)
| 1965 | Maine | 8–2 | 5–0 | 1st | L Tangerine |
| 1966 | Maine | 4–5 | 2–3 | 4th | |
| Maine: | | 80–38–7 | 41–26–5 (Yankee); 32–8–2 (MIAA) | | |
| Total: | | 80–38–7 | | | |
National championship Conference title Conference division title or championship game berth
