= 1965 New Hampshire Wildcats football team =

American college football season

1965 New Hampshire Wildcats football
- Conference: Yankee Conference
- Record: 0–8 (0–5 Yankee)
- Head coach: Andy Mooradian (1st season)
- Home stadium: Cowell Stadium

1965 Yankee Conference football standings
	Conf.					Overall
Team	W		L		T	W		L		T
Maine $	5	–	0	–	0	8	–	2	–	0
UMass	4	–	1	–	0	7	–	2	–	0
Vermont	2	–	2	–	0	6	–	2	–	0
Connecticut	2	–	2	–	0	3	–	6	–	0
Rhode Island	1	–	4	–	0	2	–	7	–	0
New Hampshire	0	–	5	–	0	0	–	8	–	0
$ – Conference champion

The 1965 New Hampshire Wildcats football team represented the University of New Hampshire as a member of the Yankee Conference during the 1965 NCAA College Division football season. Led by Andy Mooradian in his first and only season as head coach, the Wildcats compiled an overall record of 0–8 with a mark of 0–5 in conference play, placing last out of six teams in the Yankee Conference. New Hampshire played home games at Cowell Stadium in Durham, New Hampshire.

== Schedule ==
Date	Opponent	Site	Result	Attendance	Source
September 25	at Dartmouth*	Memorial Field; Hanover, NH (rivalry)	L 6–56	10,000	
October 2	at Rhode Island	Meade Stadium; Kingston, RI	L 6–23	7,300–7,413	
October 9	No. 6 Maine	Cowell Stadium; Durham, NH (Battle for the Brice–Cowell Musket)	L 13–48	7,000–7,500	
October 16	at Vermont	Centennial Field; Burlington, VT	L 7–23	5,000	
October 23	Northeastern*	Cowell Stadium; Durham, NH	L 13–26	7,000	
October 30	at Connecticut	Memorial Stadium; Storrs, CT	L 0–27	9,962	
November 6	at Springfield*	Stagg Field; Springfield, MA	L 13–43	2,400	2,400
November 13	UMass	Cowell Stadium; Durham, NH (rivalry)	L 0–46	3,000–5,000	
*Non-conference game; Rankings from AP Poll released prior to the game
