= 1951 Vermont Catamounts football team =

American college football season

1951 Vermont Catamounts football
- Conference: Yankee Conference
- Record: 0–7 (0–3 Yankee)
- Head coach: John C. Evans (9th season)
- Home stadium: Centennial Field

1951 Yankee Conference football standings
	Conf.					Overall
Team	W		L		T	W		L		T
Maine $	3	–	0	–	1	6	–	0	–	1
UMass	2	–	0	–	0	3	–	4	–	1
Connecticut	2	–	1	–	0	4	–	4	–	0
New Hampshire	1	–	2	–	1	5	–	2	–	1
Rhode Island	1	–	3	–	0	3	–	5	–	0
Vermont	0	–	3	–	0	0	–	7	–	0
$ – Conference champion

The 1951 Vermont Catamounts football team was an American football team that represented the University of Vermont in the Yankee Conference during the 1951 college football season. In their ninth year under head coach John C. Evans, the team compiled a 0–7 record.

== Schedule ==
Date	Opponent	Site	Result	Attendance	Source
September 29	Saint Michael's*	Centennial Field; Burlington, VT	L 7–41	6,000	
October 6	at Maine	Alumni Field; Orono, ME	L 0–42		
October 13	Norwich*	Centennial Field; Burlington, VT	L 0–7	6,000	
October 19	Rochester*	Centennial Field; Burlington, VT	L 0–7	1,800	
October 27	at New Hampshire	Lewis Field; Durham, NH	L 6–54	6,500	
November 3	UMass	Centennial Field; Burlington, VT	L 0–6	200	
November 17	at Middlebury*	Porter Field; Middlebury, VT	L 12–51		
*Non-conference game
