= 1951 Rhode Island Rams football team =

American college football season

1951 Rhode Island Rams football
- Conference: Yankee Conference
- Record: 3–5 (1–3 Yankee)
- Head coach: Ed Doherty (1st season)
- Home stadium: Meade Stadium

1951 Yankee Conference football standings
	Conf.					Overall
Team	W		L		T	W		L		T
Maine $	3	–	0	–	1	6	–	0	–	1
UMass	2	–	0	–	0	3	–	4	–	1
Connecticut	2	–	1	–	0	4	–	4	–	0
New Hampshire	1	–	2	–	1	5	–	2	–	1
Rhode Island	1	–	3	–	0	3	–	5	–	0
Vermont	0	–	3	–	0	0	–	7	–	0
$ – Conference champion

The 1951 Rhode Island Rams football team was an American football team that represented the University of Rhode Island as a member of the Yankee Conference during the 1951 college football season. It was the first and only season under head coach Ed Doherty, who took the job on a temporary basis after Hal Kopp was called to active duty in the United States Army. The team compiled a 3–5 record (1–3 against conference opponents), finished in fifth place out of six teams in the Yankee Conference, and was outscored by a total of 133 to 130. The team played its home games at Meade Stadium in Kingston, Rhode Island.

== Schedule ==
Date	Opponent	Site	Result	Attendance	Source
September 22	at Northeastern*	Kent Street Field; Brookline, MA	L 0–21		
September 29	at Maine	Alumni Field; Orono, ME	L 0–12		
October 6	New Hampshire	Meade Stadium; Kingston, RI	W 27–0		
October 13	at Brown*	Brown Stadium; Providence, RI (rivalry)	L 13–20	10,000	
October 20	at UMass	Alumni Field; Amherst, MA	L 7–40		
November 3	Springfield*	Meade Stadium; Kingston, RI	W 25–19		
November 10	Brooklyn*	Meade Stadium; Kingston, RI	W 52–0		
November 17	at Connecticut	Gardner Dow Athletic Fields; Storrs, CT (rivalry)	L 6–21		
*Non-conference game
