= 1965 Connecticut Huskies football team =

American college football season

1965 Connecticut Huskies football
- Conference: Yankee Conference
- Record: 3–6 (2–2 Yankee)
- Head coach: Rick Forzano (2nd season)
- Home stadium: Memorial Stadium

1965 Yankee Conference football standings
	Conf.					Overall
Team	W		L		T	W		L		T
Maine $	5	–	0	–	0	8	–	2	–	0
UMass	4	–	1	–	0	7	–	2	–	0
Vermont	2	–	2	–	0	6	–	2	–	0
Connecticut	2	–	2	–	0	3	–	6	–	0
Rhode Island	1	–	4	–	0	2	–	7	–	0
New Hampshire	0	–	5	–	0	0	–	8	–	0
$ – Conference champion

The 1965 Connecticut Huskies football team represented the University of Connecticut as a member of the Yankee Conference during the 1965 NCAA College Division football season. Led by second-year head coach Rick Forzano, Huskies compiled an overall record of 3–6 with a mark of 2–2 in conference play, tying for third place in the Yankee Conference.

== Schedule ==
Date	Opponent	Site	Result	Attendance	Source
September 25	at Yale*	Yale Bowl; New Haven, CT	W 13–6	34,157	
October 2	Rutgers*	Memorial Stadium; Storrs, CT	L 8–17	10,629	
October 9	UMass	Memorial Stadium; Storrs, CT (rivalry)	L 7–20	12,551	
October 16	at No. 4 Maine	Alumni Field; Orono, ME	L 6–24	9,400	
October 23	Temple*	Memorial Stadium; Storrs, CT	L 11–12	7,048	
October 30	New Hampshire	Memorial Stadium; Storrs, CT	W 27–0	9,962	
November 6	at Boston University*	Nickerson Field; Boston, MA	L 14–15	6,500	
November 13	at Rhode Island	Meade Stadium; Kingston, RI (rivalry)	W 14–0	3,200	
November 20	Holy Cross*	Memorial Stadium; Storrs, CT	L 0–22	1,164	
*Non-conference game; Rankings from AP Poll released prior to the game
