= 1965 UMass Redmen football team =

American college football season

1965 UMass Redmen football
- Conference: Yankee Conference
- Record: 7–2 (4–1 Yankee)
- Head coach: Vic Fusia (5th season)
- Home stadium: Alumni Stadium

1965 Yankee Conference football standings
| | Conf. | | | | | Overall |
| Team | W | | L | | T | W | | L | | T |
|---|---|---|---|---|---|---|---|---|---|---|
| Maine $ | 5 | – | 0 | – | 0 | 8 | – | 2 | – | 0 |
| UMass | 4 | – | 1 | – | 0 | 7 | – | 2 | – | 0 |
| Vermont | 2 | – | 2 | – | 0 | 6 | – | 2 | – | 0 |
| Connecticut | 2 | – | 2 | – | 0 | 3 | – | 6 | – | 0 |
| Rhode Island | 1 | – | 4 | – | 0 | 2 | – | 7 | – | 0 |
| New Hampshire | 0 | – | 5 | – | 0 | 0 | – | 8 | – | 0 |
$ – Conference champion

The 1965 UMass Redmen football team represented the University of Massachusetts Amherst in the 1965 NCAA College Division football season as a member of the Yankee Conference. The team was coached by Vic Fusia and played its home games at Alumni Stadium in Hadley, Massachusetts. The 1965 season was the Redmen's first in Alumni Stadium, their home field until 2012. UMass finished the season with a record of 7–2 overall and 4–1 in conference play.

== Schedule ==
| Date | Opponent | Site | Result | Attendance | Source |
|---|---|---|---|---|---|
| September 18 | at Maine | Alumni Field; Orono, ME | L 8–10 | 9,200–9,215 | |
| September 25 | American International* | Alumni Stadium; Hadley, MA | W 41–0 | 9,648 | |
| October 2 | Buffalo* | Alumni Stadium; Hadley, MA (rivalry) | L 6–18 | 10,200 | |
| October 9 | at Connecticut | Memorial Stadium; Storrs, CT (rivalry) | W 20–7 | 12,551 | |
| October 16 | Rhode Island^{†} | Alumni Stadium; Hadley, MA | W 30–0 | 16,100 | |
| October 23 | at Boston University* | Nickerson Field; Boston, MA | W 34–18 | 13,000 | |
| October 30 | Vermont | Alumni Stadium; Hadley, MA | W 41–6 | 8,400 | |
| November 6 | Holy Cross* | Alumni Stadium; Hadley, MA | W 27–0 | 17,400 | |
| November 13 | at New Hampshire | Cowell Stadium; Durham, NH (rivalry) | W 46–0 | 3,000–5,000 | |
*Non-conference game; ^{†}Homecoming
