= 1961 Dartmouth Indians football team =

American college football season

1961 Dartmouth Indians football
- Conference: Ivy League
- Record: 6–3 (5–2 Ivy)
- Head coach: Bob Blackman (7th season)
- Captain: James Lemen
- Home stadium: Memorial Field

1961 Ivy League football standings
	Conf.					Overall
Team	W		L		T	W		L		T
Columbia +	6	–	1	–	0	6	–	3	–	0
Harvard +	6	–	1	–	0	6	–	3	–	0
Dartmouth	5	–	2	–	0	6	–	3	–	0
Princeton	5	–	2	–	0	5	–	4	–	0
Yale	3	–	4	–	0	4	–	5	–	0
Cornell	2	–	5	–	0	3	–	6	–	0
Penn	1	–	6	–	0	2	–	7	–	0
Brown	0	–	7	–	0	0	–	9	–	0
+ – Conference co-champions

The 1961 Dartmouth Indians football team was an American football team that represented Dartmouth College as a member of the Ivy League during the 1961 college football season. In their seventh season under head coach Bob Blackman, the Indians compiled a 6–3 record (5–2 in conference games), tied for third place in the Ivy League, and outscored opponents by a toal of 197 to 104. Fullback James Lemen was the team captain. They outscored Ivy opponents, 156 to 84.

The team's statistical leaders included quarterback Bill King with 711 passing yards and John Krumme with 416 rushing yards and 192 receiving yards. Tackle Carter Strickland was selected as a second-team player on the 1961 All-Ivy League football team.

Dartmouth played its home games at Memorial Field on the college campus in Hanover, New Hampshire.

== Schedule ==
Date	Opponent	Site	Result	Attendance	Source
September 30	New Hampshire*	Memorial Field; Hanover, NH (rivalry)	W 28–3	10,500	
October 7	at Penn	Franklin Field; Philadelphia, PA	W 30–0	12,596	
October 14	Brown	Memorial Field; Hanover, NH	W 34–0	9,000	
October 21	at Holy Cross*	Fitton Field; Worcester, MA	L 13–17	18,000	
October 28	at Harvard	Harvard Stadium; Boston, MA (rivalry)	L 15–21	32,500	
November 4	at Yale	Yale Bowl; New Haven, CT	W 24–8	41,974	
November 11	at Columbia	Baker Field; New York, NY	L 14–35	25,106	
November 18	Cornell	Memorial Field; Hanover, NH	W 15–14	11,000	
November 25	at Princeton	Palmer Stadium; Princeton, NJ	W 24–6	30,000	
*Non-conference game

== Statistics ==
Junior quarterback Bill King completed 49 of 98 passes (50.0%) for 711 yards with 10 touchdowns, four interceptions, and a 136.5 quarterback rating. He also had 176 rushing yards and led the team in scoring with 36 points.

Halfback John Krumme led the team in both rushing (416 yards, 99 carries, 4.2-yard average) and receiving (17 receptions, 192 yards).

Other significant contributors included halfbacks Tom Spangenberg (393 rushing yards on 90 carries, 120 receiving yards on nine receptions), Dave Lawson (149 rushing yards on 33 carries, 37 receiving yards on four receptions), and Chris Vancura (135 rushing yards on 41 carries, 38 receiving yards on four receptions), and ends Frank Finsthwait (three receptions, 87 receiving yards), Dave Usher (82 receiving yards), and Carl Funke (two receptions, 75 receiving yards).

== Players ==
- Pete Benzien, fullback
- Bill Blumenschein, 200 pounds
- Ed Boies (#56), center
- Greg Cooke, halfback 174 pounds
- Dave Evans, fullback
- Finsthwait, end
- Carl Funke (#82), end, 193 pounds
- Walter Grudi (#72), tackle
- Chuck Hegeman, guard, 185 pounds
- Billy King (#14), quarterback, 178 pounds
- John Krumme (#33), halfback
- Steve Lasch (#64), guard, 192 pounds
- Dave Lawson
- Jim Lemen (#45), fullback and captain, 195 pounds
- Don McKinnon, center, 212 pounds
- Tom Parkinson, fullback
- Runge, tackle
- Ron Schram, quarterback
- Skinner, center
- Tom Spangenberg (#23), halfback
- Gary Spiess, halfback, 163 pounds
- Carter Strickland (#73), tackle, 222 pounds
- Bill Tragakis (#61), guard
- Dave Usher (#84), end, 201 pounds
- Chris "Swish" Vancura, halfback
- Bill Wellstead, kicker
