= 1962 Vermont Catamounts football team =

American college football season

1962 Vermont Catamounts football
- Conference: Yankee Conference
- Record: 3–5 (1–3 Yankee)
- Head coach: Bob Clifford (1st season)
- Home stadium: Centennial Field

1962 Yankee Conference football standings
	Conf.					Overall
Team	W		L		T	W		L		T
New Hampshire $	4	–	0	–	1	7	–	0	–	1
UMass	4	–	1	–	0	6	–	3	–	0
Connecticut	2	–	2	–	0	3	–	6	–	0
Rhode Island	1	–	3	–	1	2	–	5	–	2
Vermont	1	–	3	–	0	3	–	5	–	0
Maine	1	–	4	–	0	4	–	4	–	0
$ – Conference champion

The 1962 Vermont Catamounts football team was an American football team that represented the University of Vermont in the Yankee Conference during the 1962 NCAA College Division football season. In their first year under head coach Bob Clifford, the team compiled a 3–5 record.

== Schedule ==
Date	Opponent	Site	Result	Attendance	Source
September 22	American International*	Centennial Field; Burlington, VT	L 8–14	5,200	
September 29	at RPI*	Troy, NY	W 82–6	1,000–1,500	
October 6	Maine	Centennial Field; Burlington, VT	L 6–9	5,500–6,000	
October 13	at Rhode Island	Meade Stadium; Kingston, RI	W 21–12	4,000	
October 20	at New Hampshire	Alumni Field; Durham, NH	L 6–19	7,000–8,000	
October 27	at Norwich*	Sabine Field; Northfield, VT	W 21–8	4,000	
November 3	UMass	Centennial Field; Burlington, VT	L 6–34	6,500	
November 10	Middlebury*	Centennial Field; Burlington, VT	L 6–14	4,500	
*Non-conference game
