= Andy Mooradian =

American football, basketball, and baseball player, coach, and administrator

Biographical details
- Born: August 26, 1923; Revere, Massachusetts, U.S.
- Died: October 26, 1994 (aged 71); Dover, New Hampshire, U.S.

Coaching career (HC unless noted)

Football
- 1951–1964: New Hampshire (assistant)
- 1965: New Hampshire

Basketball
- 1950–1951: New Hampshire

Baseball
- 1963–1965: New Hampshire

Administrative career (AD unless noted)
- 1966–1987: New Hampshire
- 1978–1987: Yankee Conf. (commissioner)
- 1985–1986: NACDA (president)

Head coaching record
- Overall: 0–8 (football); 4–12 (basketball); 18–34 (baseball)

Andrew T. Mooradian (August 26, 1923 – October 26, 1994) was an American football, basketball, and baseball player, coach, and college athletics administrator. He served as the head coach of the University of New Hampshire's men's basketball team during the 1950–51 season, compiling a 4–12 record. He served as the head coach of the university's football team for the 1965 season, compiling an 0–8 record. Mooradian was also the Wildcats' head baseball coach for three seasons, from 1963 to 1965.

Mooradian died of cancer on October 26, 1994.

== Head coaching record ==
=== Football ===
Year	Team	Overall	Conference	Standing	Bowl/playoffs
New Hampshire Wildcats (Yankee Conference) (1965)
1965	New Hampshire	0–8	0–5	6th	
New Hampshire:		0–8	0–5		
Total:		0–8			
