= 1962 Connecticut Huskies football team =

American college football season

1962 Connecticut Huskies football
- Conference: Yankee Conference
- Record: 3–6 (2–2 Yankee)
- Head coach: Bob Ingalls (11th season)
- Home stadium: Memorial Stadium

1962 Yankee Conference football standings
	Conf.					Overall
Team	W		L		T	W		L		T
New Hampshire $	4	–	0	–	1	7	–	0	–	1
UMass	4	–	1	–	0	6	–	3	–	0
Connecticut	2	–	2	–	0	3	–	6	–	0
Rhode Island	1	–	3	–	1	2	–	5	–	2
Vermont	1	–	3	–	0	3	–	5	–	0
Maine	1	–	4	–	0	4	–	4	–	0
$ – Conference champion

The 1962 Connecticut Huskies football team represented the University of Connecticut in the 1962 NCAA College Division football season. The Huskies were led by 11th-year head coach Bob Ingalls, and completed the season with a record of 3–6.

== Schedule ==
Date	Opponent	Site	Result	Attendance	Source
September 29	at Yale*	Yale Bowl; New Haven, CT	L 14–18	37,636	
October 6	Rutgers*	Memorial Stadium; Storrs, CT	W 15–9	6,852	
October 13	at UMass	Alumni Field; Amherst, MA (rivalry)	L 6–16	10,075	
October 20	Maine	Memorial Stadium; Storrs, CT	W 14–6	11,088–12,500	
October 27	at Delaware*	Delaware Stadium; Newark, DE	L 0–34	8,300–8,500	
November 3	at New Hampshire	Cowell Stadium; Durham, NH	L 0–7	3,500	
November 10	Boston University*	Memorial Stadium; Storrs, CT	L 7–13	5,579	
November 17	Rhode Island	Memorial Stadium; Storrs, CT (rivalry)	W 27–0	9,540–10,000	
November 24	at Holy Cross*	Fitton Field; Worcester, MA	L 14–36	9,000	
*Non-conference game
