= 1951 UMass Redmen football team =

American college football season

1951 UMass Redmen football
- Conference: Yankee Conference
- Record: 3–4–1 (2–0 Yankee)
- Head coach: Thomas Eck (6th season)
- Home stadium: Alumni Field

1951 Yankee Conference football standings
| | Conf. | | | | | Overall |
| Team | W | | L | | T | W | | L | | T |
|---|---|---|---|---|---|---|---|---|---|---|
| Maine $ | 3 | – | 0 | – | 1 | 6 | – | 0 | – | 1 |
| UMass | 2 | – | 0 | – | 0 | 3 | – | 4 | – | 1 |
| Connecticut | 2 | – | 1 | – | 0 | 4 | – | 4 | – | 0 |
| New Hampshire | 1 | – | 2 | – | 1 | 5 | – | 2 | – | 1 |
| Rhode Island | 1 | – | 3 | – | 0 | 3 | – | 5 | – | 0 |
| Vermont | 0 | – | 3 | – | 0 | 0 | – | 7 | – | 0 |
$ – Conference champion

The 1951 UMass Redmen football team represented the University of Massachusetts Amherst in the 1951 college football season as a member of the Yankee Conference. The team was coached by Thomas Eck and played its home games at Alumni Field in Amherst, Massachusetts. The 1951 season was Eck's last as coach of the Minutemen. UMass finished the season with a record of 3–4–1 overall and 2–0 in conference play.

== Schedule ==
| Date | Opponent | Site | Result | Attendance | Source |
|---|---|---|---|---|---|
| September 29 | at Bates* | Garcelon Field; Lewiston, ME | W 21–7 | | |
| October 6 | Worcester Tech* | Alumni Field; Amherst, MA | L 13–14 | | |
| October 13 | Williams* | Alumni Field; Amherst, MA | L 7–14 | | |
| October 20 | Rhode Island | Alumni Field; Amherst, MA | W 40–7 | | |
| October 27 | at Northeastern* | Kent Street Field; Brookline, MA | L 7–20 | | |
| November 3 | at Vermont | Centennial Field; Burlington, VT | W 6–0 | 200 | |
| November 10 | at Springfield* | Pratt Field; Springfield, MA | L 14–42 | | |
| November 17 | Tufts* | Alumni Field; Amherst, MA | T 6–6 | | |
*Non-conference game
