= 1961 Brown Bears football team =

American college football season

1961 Brown Bears football
- Conference: Ivy League
- Record: 0–9 (0–7 Ivy)
- Head coach: John McLaughry (3rd season)
- Captain: N. J. Rohrback
- Home stadium: Brown Stadium

1961 Ivy League football standings
	Conf.					Overall
Team	W		L		T	W		L		T
Columbia +	6	–	1	–	0	6	–	3	–	0
Harvard +	6	–	1	–	0	6	–	3	–	0
Dartmouth	5	–	2	–	0	6	–	3	–	0
Princeton	5	–	2	–	0	5	–	4	–	0
Yale	3	–	4	–	0	4	–	5	–	0
Cornell	2	–	5	–	0	3	–	6	–	0
Penn	1	–	6	–	0	2	–	7	–	0
Brown	0	–	7	–	0	0	–	9	–	0
+ – Conference co-champions

The 1961 Brown Bears football team was an American football team that represented Brown University as a member of the Ivy League during the 1961 college football season. In their third season under head coach John McLaughry, the Bears compiled a 0–9 record (0–7 in conference games), finished in last place in the Ivy League, and were outscored by a total of 245 to 24 (203 to 9 in conference games). N.J. Rohrback was the team captain.

The team's statistical leaders included Jack Rohrbach (411 passing yards), Raymond Barry (334 rushing yards), and Dave Nelson (106 receiving yards.

Brown played its home games at Brown Stadium in Providence, Rhode Island.

== Schedule ==
Date	Opponent	Site	Result	Attendance	Source
September 30	Columbia	Brown Stadium; Providence, RI	L 0–50	9,000	
October 7	at Yale	Yale Bowl; New Haven, CT	L 3–14	23,605	
October 14	at Dartmouth	Memorial Field; Hanover, NH	L 0–34	9,000	
October 21	at Penn	Franklin Field; Philadelphia, PA	L 0–7	6,867	
October 28	Rhode Island*	Brown Stadium; Providence, RI (rivalry)	L 9–12	11,000–11,038	
November 4	Princeton	Brown Stadium; Providence, RI	L 0–52	10,000	
November 11	at Cornell	Schoellkopf Field; Ithaca, NY	L 0–25	8,000	
November 18	at Harvard	Harvard Stadium; Boston, MA	L 6–21	10,000	
November 23	Colgate*	Brown Stadium; Providence, RI	L 6–30	5,000	
*Non-conference game

== Statistics ==
Brown gained an average of 134.7 rushing yards and 69.0 passing yards per game. On defense, the Bears allowed opponents to gain an average of 234.0 rushing yards and 66.7 passing yards per game.

Brown's passing game was led by quarterbacks Jack Rohrbach and Dennis Hauflaire. Rohrbach completed 44 of 111 passes (39.6%) for 411 yards with one interception, 16 interceptions, and a 44.9 quarterback rating. Hauflaire completed 21 of 49 passes (42.9%) for 192 yards.

Brown had six backs who rushed for over 100 yards, led by Raymond Barry (334 yards, 90 carries, 3.7-yard average), Jan Moyer (271 yards, 65 carries, 4.2-yard average), Bill Lemire (182 yards, 40 carries, 4.6-yard average), and Jon Meeker (173 yards, 57 carries, 3.0-yard average).

The team's leading receivers were Dave Nelson (nine receptions, 106 yards), Don Boyle (10 receptions, 98 yards), and Tom Draper (eight receptions, 87 yards).
