= 1951 Connecticut Huskies football team =

American college football season

1951 Connecticut Huskies football
- Conference: Yankee Conference
- Record: 4–4 (2–1 Yankee)
- Head coach: Arthur Valpey (2nd season)
- Home stadium: Gardner Dow Athletic Fields

1951 Yankee Conference football standings
	Conf.					Overall
Team	W		L		T	W		L		T
Maine $	3	–	0	–	1	6	–	0	–	1
UMass	2	–	0	–	0	3	–	4	–	1
Connecticut	2	–	1	–	0	4	–	4	–	0
New Hampshire	1	–	2	–	1	5	–	2	–	1
Rhode Island	1	–	3	–	0	3	–	5	–	0
Vermont	0	–	3	–	0	0	–	7	–	0
$ – Conference champion

The 1951 Connecticut Huskies football team represented the University of Connecticut in the 1951 college football season. The Huskies were led by second-year head coach Arthur Valpey, and completed the season with a record of 4–4.

== Schedule ==
Date	Opponent	Site	Result	Attendance	Source
September 29	Delaware*	Gardner Dow Athletic Fields; Storrs, CT	W 27–14	7,500	
October 13	at Williams*	Weston Field; Williamstown, MA	L 6–7		
October 13	Springfield*	Gardner Dow Athletic Fields; Storrs, CT	W 7–0		
October 20	at Maine	Orono, ME	L 19–49		
October 27	at Buffalo*	Civic Stadium; Buffalo, NY	L 6–20		
November 3	New Hampshire	Gardner Dow Athletic Fields; Storrs, CT	W 20–0		
November 10	American International*	Gardner Dow Athletic Fields; Storrs, CT	L 0–6		
November 17	Rhode Island	Gardner Dow Athletic Fields; Storrs, CT (rivalry)	W 21–6		
*Non-conference game
