= 1961 New Hampshire Wildcats football team =

American college football season

1961 New Hampshire Wildcats football
- Conference: Yankee Conference
- Record: 3–5 (1–3 Yankee)
- Head coach: Chief Boston (13th season)
- Home stadium: Cowell Stadium

1961 Yankee Conference football standings
	Conf.					Overall
Team	W		L		T	W		L		T
Maine $	5	–	0	–	0	8	–	0	–	1
UMass	3	–	1	–	0	5	–	4	–	0
Connecticut	2	–	2	–	0	2	–	7	–	0
New Hampshire	1	–	3	–	0	3	–	5	–	0
Rhode Island	1	–	4	–	0	2	–	6	–	1
Vermont	0	–	2	–	0	3	–	3	–	1
$ – Conference champion

The 1961 New Hampshire Wildcats football team was an American football team that represented the University of New Hampshire as a member of the Yankee Conference during the 1961 college football season. In its 13th year under head coach Chief Boston, the Wildcats compiled a 3–5 record (1–3 in conference games), outscored opponents by a total of 103 to 101, and finished fourth out of six teams in the Yankee Conference.

The team played its home games at Cowell Stadium in Durham, New Hampshire.

== Schedule ==
Date	Opponent	Site	Result	Attendance	Source
September 23	American International*	Cowell Stadium; Durham, NH	L 0–6	4,000–4,500	
September 30	at Dartmouth*	Memorial Field; Hanover, NH (rivalry)	L 3–28	10,500	
October 7	at Rhode Island	Meade Stadium; Kingston, RI	W 20–0	2,000–3,500	
October 14	Maine	Cowell Stadium; Durham, NH (Battle for the Brice–Cowell Musket)	L 6–7	7,500–8,500	
October 28	Merchant Marine*	Cowell Stadium; Durham, NH	W 8–7	4,000–5,000	
November 4	at Connecticut	Memorial Stadium; Storrs, CT	L 23–30	7,400–7,464	
November 11	at Springfield*	Springfield, MA	W 36–14	2,500–3,300	
November 18	UMass	Cowell Stadium; Durham, NH (rivalry)	L 7–9	3,800–5,500	
*Non-conference game

== Statistics ==
The 1961 Wildcats tallied 1,615 yards of total offense (202 per game), consisting of 1,032 rushing yards (129 per game) and 583 passing yards (72.9 per game). On defense, they gave up 1,537 yards (192 per game) with 1,050 rushing yards (131.2 per game) and 387 passing yards (48.2 per game).

Quarterback Robert Dickson completed 59 of 139 passes (42.4%) for 560 yards with 11 interceptions and five touchdowns. The leading receiver was end Edward Facey with 19 receptions for 160 yards and one touchdown.

Halfback Richard Mezquita led the team in both rushing (407 yards on 96 carries) and scoring (18 points on three touchdowns). Fullback Charles Beach ranked second in rushing with 184 yards on 34 carries.

== Awards and honors ==
Two New Hampshire players received first-team honors on the 1961 All-Yankee Conference football team selected by the conference coaches. The New Hampshire honorees, Paul D'Allesandro and Ed Cramer, were both named at the guard position.
