= John Chironna =

American football and baseball coach (1928–2010)

Biographical details
- Born: July 4, 1928; Plainfield, New Jersey, U.S.
- Died: October 15, 2010 (aged 82)

Playing career

Football
- 1951–1954: Bucknell
- Position: Guard

Coaching career (HC unless noted)

Football
- 1961–1962: Rhode Island

Baseball
- 1960–1961: Rhode Island

Head coaching record
- Overall: 4–11–3 (football); 16–15–1 (baseball)

John F. Chironna (July 4, 1928 – October 15, 2010) was an American football and baseball coach. He served as the head coach of the Rhode Island Rams football team in 1961 and 1962, compiling a record of 4–11–3. Chironna was also head coach of the Rhode Island Rams baseball program from 1960 to 1961, tallying a mark of 16–15–1.

Born in Plainfield, New Jersey, Chironna was raised in Westfield, New Jersey and played football and basketball at Westfield High School. He then played both sports at Bucknell University and was named an All-East selection three times. Chironna was inducted into the Bucknell Hall of Fame in 1984 and was named to Bucknell's "Football Team of the Century" in 1996.

Former Notre Dame head coach Charlie Weis credited Chironna for influencing his view of football. Weis said, "John Chironna taught me the game of football. Parcells and Belichick taught me how to navigate at this level, but Chironna, he taught me the game." Weis taught English and was an assistant coach to Chironna at Morristown High School in Morris County, New Jersey during Weis' early coaching career.

== Head coaching record ==
=== Football ===
Year	Team	Overall	Conference	Standing	Bowl/playoffs
Rhode Island Rams (Yankee Conference) (1961–1962)
1961	Rhode Island	2–6–1	1–4	5th	
1962	Rhode Island	2–5–2	1–3	T–4th	
Rhode Island:		4–11–3	2–7		
Total:		4–11–3			

=== Baseball ===
Record table
Season	Team	Overall	Conference	Standing	Postseason
Rhode Island (Yankee Conference) (1960–1961)
1960	Rhode Island	8–6–1			
1961	Rhode Island	8–9			
Rhode Island:		316–15–1			
Total:		16–15–1			
