= 1961 Rhode Island Rams football team =

American college football season

1961 Rhode Island Rams football
- Conference: Yankee Conference
- Record: 2–6–1 (1–4 Yankee)
- Head coach: John Chironna (1st season)
- Home stadium: Meade Stadium

1961 Yankee Conference football standings
	Conf.					Overall
Team	W		L		T	W		L		T
Maine $	5	–	0	–	0	8	–	0	–	1
UMass	3	–	1	–	0	5	–	4	–	0
Connecticut	2	–	2	–	0	2	–	7	–	0
New Hampshire	1	–	3	–	0	3	–	5	–	0
Rhode Island	1	–	4	–	0	2	–	6	–	1
Vermont	0	–	2	–	0	3	–	3	–	1
$ – Conference champion

The 1961 Rhode Island Rams football team was an American football team that represented the University of Rhode Island as a member of the Yankee Conference during the 1961 college football season. In its first season under head coach John Chironna, the team compiled a 2–6–1 record (1–4 against conference opponents), finished in fifth place out of six teams in the Yankee Conference, and was outscored by a total of 163 to 69. The team played its home games at Meade Stadium in Kingston, Rhode Island.

== Schedule ==
Date	Opponent	Site	Result	Attendance	Source
September 23	at Northeastern*	Kent Street Field; Brookline, MA	L 13–26	2,500–5,100	
September 30	Maine	Meade Stadium; Kingston, RI	L 20–22	3,500	
October 7	New Hampshire	Meade Stadium; Kingston, RI	L 0–20	2,000–3,500	
October 14	at Vermont	Centennial Field; Burlington, VT	W 18–6	3,500	
October 21	at UMass	Alumni Field; Amherst, MA	L 0–25	4,500	
October 28	at Brown*	Brown Stadium; Providence, RI (rivalry)	W 12–9	11,000–11,038	
November 4	Springfield*	Meade Stadium; Kingston, RI	T 6–6	2,000–3,500	
November 11	at Hofstra*	Hofstra College Stadium; Hempstead, NY	L 0–12	4,233–5,000	
November 18	Connecticut	Meade Stadium; Kingston, RI (rivalry)	L 0–37	6,000	
*Non-conference game
