= 1961 UMass Redmen football team =

American college football season

1961 UMass Redmen football
- Conference: Yankee Conference
- Record: 5–4 (3–1 Yankee)
- Head coach: Vic Fusia (1st season)
- Home stadium: Alumni Field

1961 Yankee Conference football standings
	Conf.					Overall
Team	W		L		T	W		L		T
Maine $	5	–	0	–	0	8	–	0	–	1
UMass	3	–	1	–	0	5	–	4	–	0
Connecticut	2	–	2	–	0	2	–	7	–	0
New Hampshire	1	–	3	–	0	3	–	5	–	0
Rhode Island	1	–	4	–	0	2	–	6	–	1
Vermont	0	–	2	–	0	3	–	3	–	1
$ – Conference champion

The 1961 UMass Redmen football team represented the University of Massachusetts Amherst in the 1961 college football season as a member of the Yankee Conference. The team was coached by Vic Fusia and played its home games at Alumni Field in Amherst, Massachusetts. The 1961 season was Fusia's first as coach of the Redmen. UMass finished the season with a record of 5–4 overall and 3–1 in conference play.

== Schedule ==
Date	Opponent	Site	Result	Attendance	Source
September 30	American International*	Alumni Field; Amherst, MA	W 21–12	5,500	
October 7	Villanova*	Alumni Field; Amherst, MA	L 13–33	6,309	
October 14	at Connecticut	Memorial Stadium; Storrs, CT (rivalry)	W 31–13	10,079	
October 21	Rhode Island	Alumni Field; Amherst, MA	W 25–0	4,500	
October 28	at Northeastern*	Kent Street Field; Brookline, MA	W 26–7	7,600	
November 4	Boston University*	Alumni Field; Amherst, MA	L 7–21	6,632	
November 11	at Holy Cross*	Fitton Field; Worcester, MA	L 7–44	15,000	
November 18	at New Hampshire	Cowell Stadium; Durham, NH (rivalry)	W 9–7	3,800–5,500	
November 22	at Maine	Alumni Field; Orono, ME	L 7–10	4,500	
*Non-conference game
