= Tom Harp =

American football player and coach

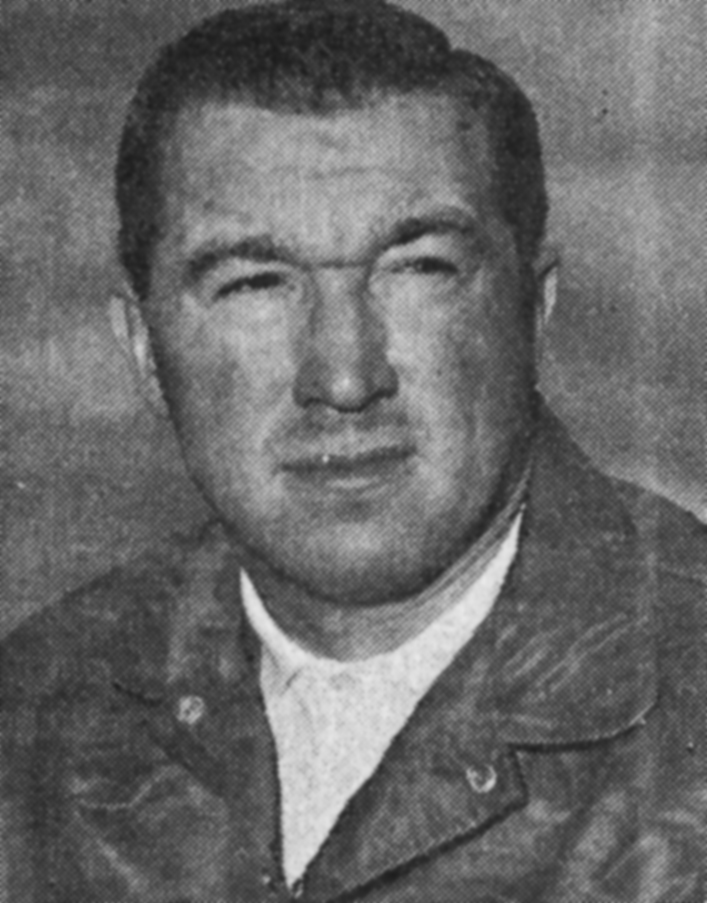
- Harp, c. 1967

Biographical details
- Born: c. 1927

Playing career
- 1945: Miami (OH)
- 1949–1950: Muskingum
- Positions: Quarterback, fullback

Coaching career (HC unless noted)
- 1951–1953: Carrollton HS (OH)
- 1954–1955: Massillon Washington HS (OH)
- 1956–1960: Army (backfield)
- 1961–1965: Cornell
- 1966–1970: Duke
- 1973–1977: Indiana State

Head coaching record
- Overall: 61–82–4 (college); 38–8–1 (high school)

Thomas Harp (born c. 1927) is an American former football player and coach. He served as the head football coach at Cornell University (1961–1965), Duke University (1967–1970), and Indiana State University (1973–1977), compiling a career college football record of 61–82–4.

== Playing career ==
Harp played football as a fullback at Miami University in 1945 and then as a quarterback at Muskingum University in 1949 and 1950, where he was a member of back-to-back Ohio Athletic Conference championship squads.

== Coaching career ==
Harp began his coaching career in 1951 at Carrollton High School in Carrollton, Ohio, where he compiled a record of 20–6–1 over three seasons. He then moved on to Massillon Washington High School in Massillon, Ohio, tallying a mark of 18–2 over two seasons and winning the Ohio State title in 1954. From 1956 to 1960, Harp coached the backfield at the United States Military Academy under head coaches Earl Blaik and Dale Hall. Harp was the architect of the "Lonesome End" concept during his West Point tenure.

From 1961 to 1965, Harp coached at Cornell, where he compiled a 19–23–3 record; when he began at Cornell, at age 33, he was the youngest head coach in the Ivy League. From 1966 to 1970, he coached at Duke, where he compiled a 22–28–1 record. From 1973 to 1977, he coached at Indiana State, where he compiled a 20–31 record.

== Family ==
Harp is the stepfather of former Miami Dolphins head coach Cam Cameron.

== Head coaching record ==
Year	Team	Overall	Conference	Standing	Bowl/playoffs
Cornell Big Red (Ivy League) (1961–1965)
1961	Cornell	3–6	2–5	6th	
1962	Cornell	4–5	4–3	T–3rd	
1963	Cornell	5–4	4–3	T–4th	
1964	Cornell	3–5–1	3–4	T–5th	
1965	Cornell	4–3–2	3–3–1	4th	
Cornell:		19–23–3	16–18–1		
Duke Blue Devils (Atlantic Coast Conference) (1966–1970)
1966	Duke	5–5	2–3	5th	
1967	Duke	4–6	2–4	6th	
1968	Duke	4–6	3–4	5th	
1969	Duke	3–6–1	3–3–1	T–3rd	
1970	Duke	6–5	5–2	T–2nd	
Duke:		22–28–1	15–16–1		
Indiana State Sycamores (NCAA Division II independent) (1973–1975)
1973	Indiana State	4–7			
1974	Indiana State	5–5			
1975	Indiana State	5–5			
Indiana State Sycamores (NCAA Division I independent) (1976)
1976	Indiana State	3–7			
Indiana State Sycamores (Missouri Valley Conference) (1977)
1977	Indiana State	3–7	2–3	T–4th	
Indiana State:		20–31	2–3		
Total:		61–82–4			
