= 1961 Connecticut Huskies football team =

American college football season

1961 Connecticut Huskies football
- Conference: Yankee Conference
- Record: 2–7 (2–2 Yankee)
- Head coach: Bob Ingalls (10th season)
- Home stadium: Memorial Stadium

1961 Yankee Conference football standings
	Conf.					Overall
Team	W		L		T	W		L		T
Maine $	5	–	0	–	0	8	–	0	–	1
UMass	3	–	1	–	0	5	–	4	–	0
Connecticut	2	–	2	–	0	2	–	7	–	0
New Hampshire	1	–	3	–	0	3	–	5	–	0
Rhode Island	1	–	4	–	0	2	–	6	–	1
Vermont	0	–	2	–	0	3	–	3	–	1
$ – Conference champion

The 1961 Connecticut Huskies football team represented the University of Connecticut in the 1961 college football season. The Huskies were led by tenth-year head coach Bob Ingalls, and completed the season with a record of 2–7.

== Schedule ==
Date	Opponent	Site	Result	Attendance	Source
September 30	at Yale*	Yale Bowl; New Haven, CT	L 0–18	34,786	
October 7	at Rutgers*	Rutgers Stadium; Piscataway, NJ	L 12–35	11,000	
October 14	UMass	Memorial Stadium; Storrs, CT (rivalry)	L 13–31	10,079	
October 21	at Maine	Alumni Field; Orono, ME	L 0–2	8,000	
October 28	Buffalo*	Memorial Stadium; Storrs, CT	L 7–30	7,087	
November 4	New Hampshire	Memorial Stadium; Storrs, CT	W 30–23	7,400–7,464	
November 11	at Boston University*	Boston University Field; Boston, MA	L 6–14	8,000	
November 18	at Rhode Island	Meade Stadium; Kingston, RI (rivalry)	W 37–0	6,000	
November 25	Holy Cross*	Memorial Stadium; Storrs, CT	L 3–14	7,936	
*Non-conference game

== After the season ==
=== NFL draft ===
The following Huskies were drafted into the National Football League following the season.

Round	Pick	Player	Position	NFL club
11	153	Dave Bishop	Back	New York Giants
16	213	John Contoulis	Tackle	New York Giants
