= Washington Irving High School (Tarrytown, New York) =

Historic school building in Tarrytown, New York

- former Washington Irving High School
- U.S. National Register of Historic Places
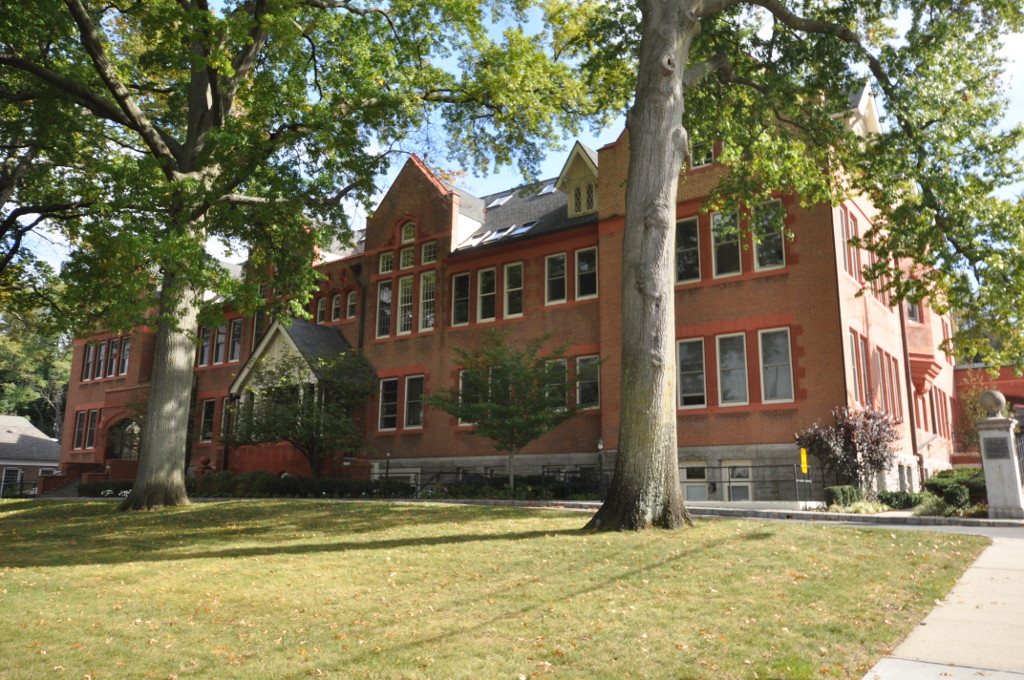

- Location within New York Location within the United States
- Location: 18 N. Broadway, Tarrytown, New York
- Coordinates: 41°3′32″N 73°51′28″W
- Area: 1 acre (0.40 ha)
- Built: 1898
- Architect: Manning, A. J.
- Architectural style: Tudor Revival, Other, Elizabethan Revival
- NRHP reference No.: 84003437
- Added to NRHP: April 26, 1984

Washington Irving High School at 18 North Broadway in Tarrytown, New York, was built c. 1897. Noted for its turn-of-the-century Elizabethan/Tudor Revival architecture, the former school building was entered on the National Register of Historic Places on April 26, 1984. The site of the school is considered to be one possibility – of many – for the location of the Elizabeth Van Tassel house, a Revolutionary War-era tavern mentioned by Washington Irving in The Legend of Sleepy Hollow.

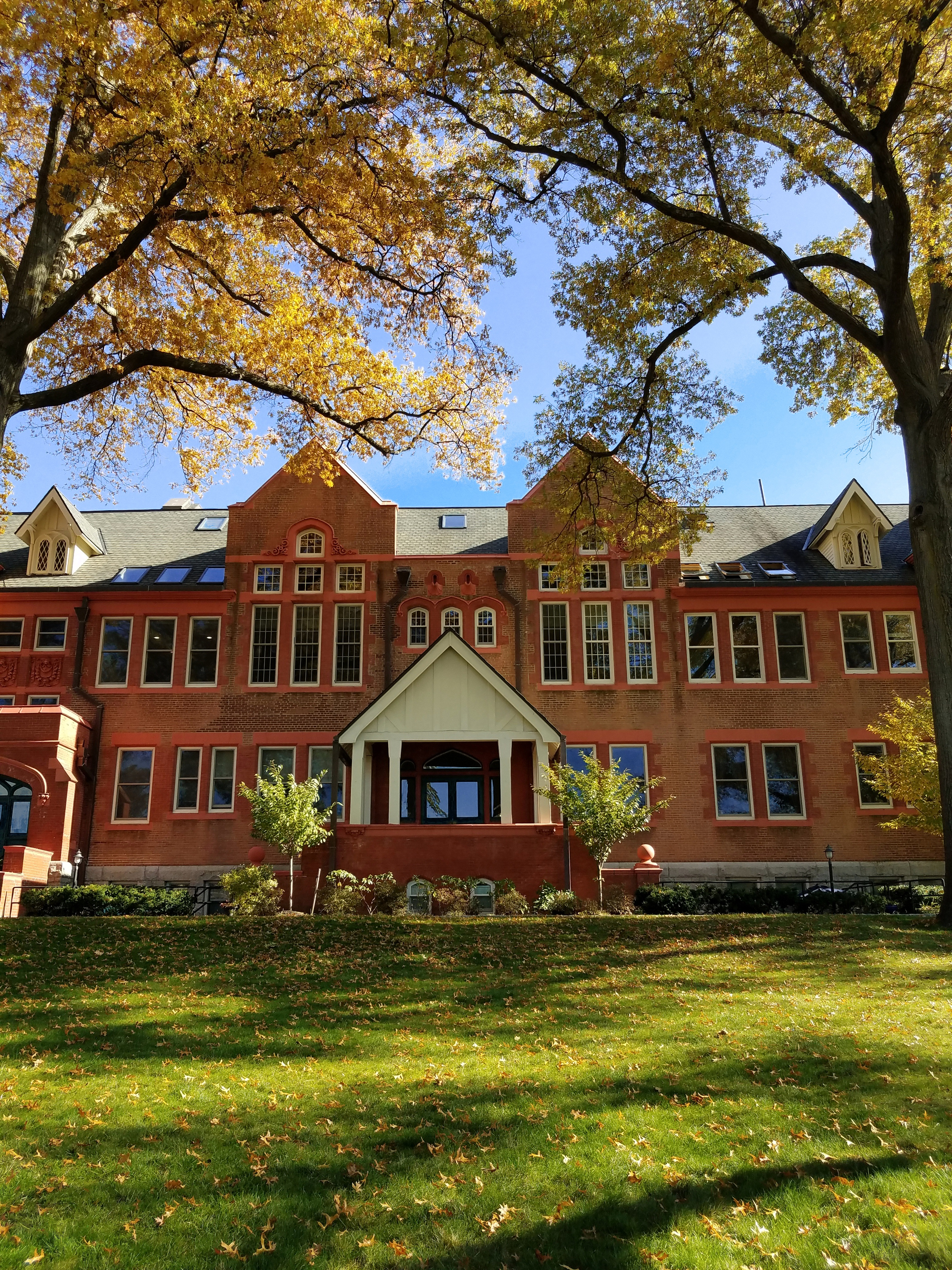
West facade

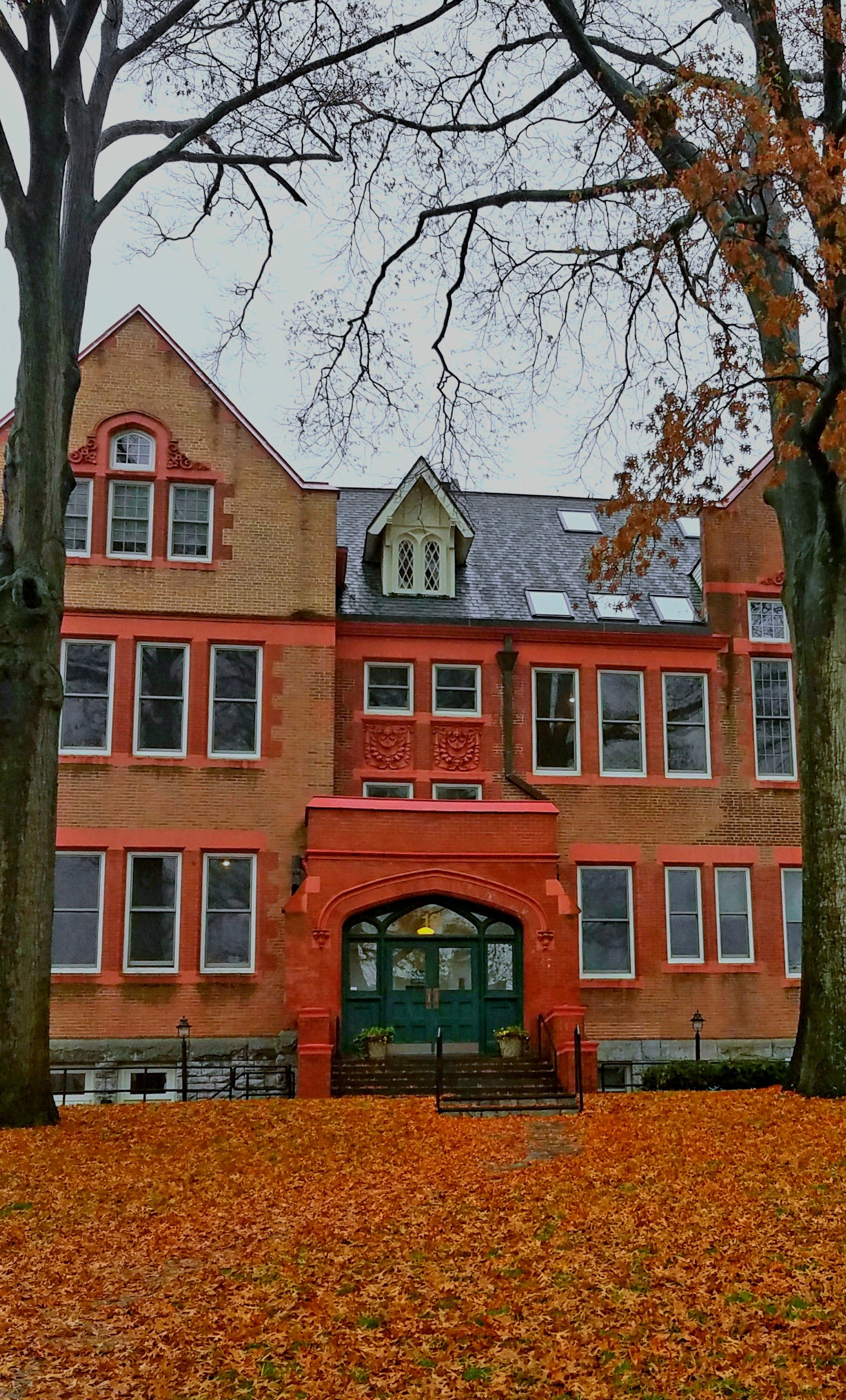
Side entrance

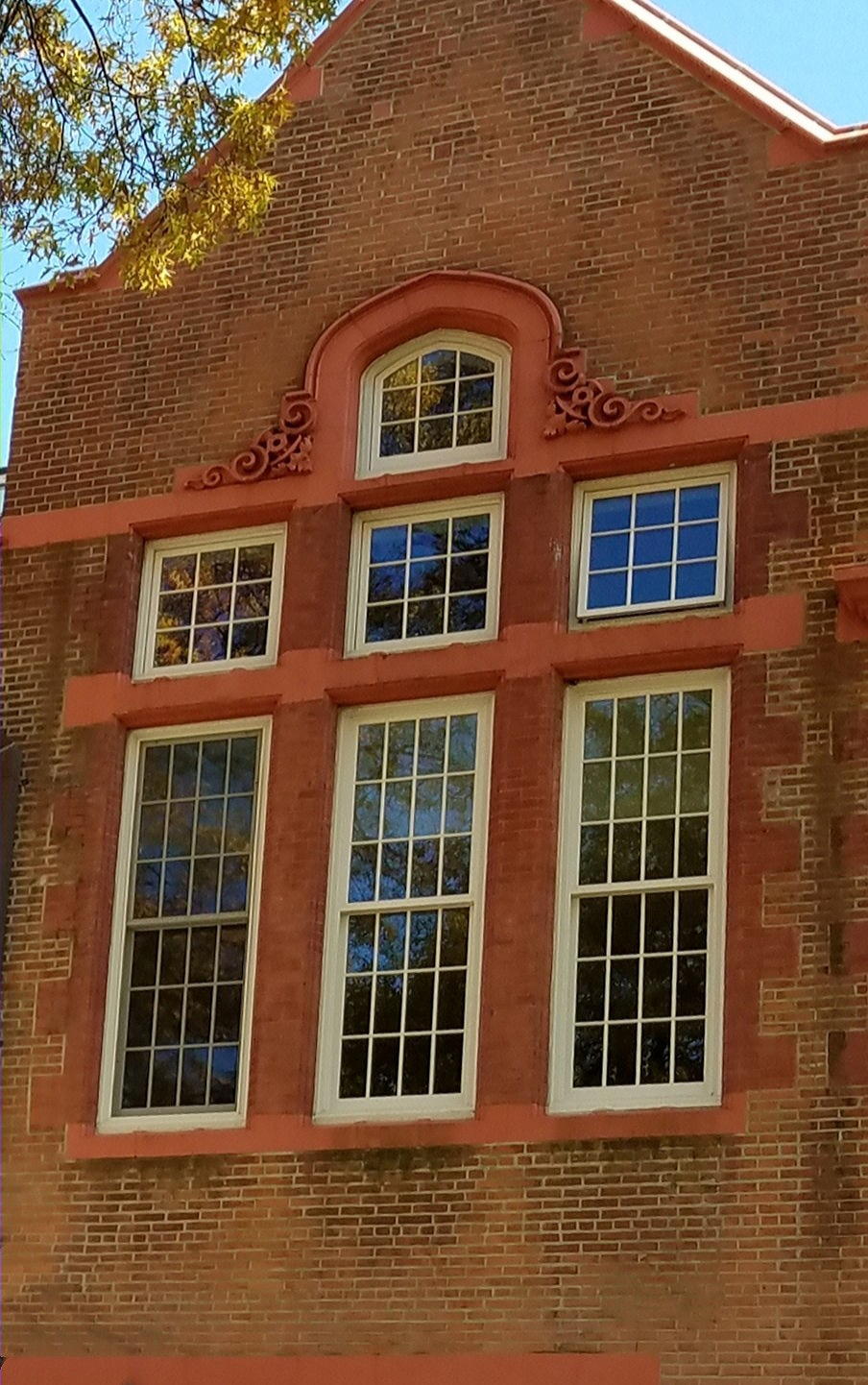
One of the four front gables

The school building was designed by Irvington architect Alfred J. Manning and constructed by local builder James Parr. Situated prominently on Broadway, near the heart of the village, the structure was built using a blend of brick, sandstone, and terracotta. Its design was an Elizabethan-style take on the popular Tudor Revival movement—a sharp contrast to the neoclassical style Manning used for the Irvington Town Hall around that same period. (That building is also on the National Register of Historic Places.) The exterior features a raised granite foundation, four prominent front-facing gables, red-brick walls, terracotta detailing, and Tudor-arched windows and porch designed to resemble the historic college buildings of Oxford and Cambridge.

The school was named after Tarrytown’s most iconic resident, the author Washington Irving, whose estate, Sunnyside, is located on the southern boundary of the village. Though designated as a "high school," it served more than 580 students across grades 1 through 12. For its time, the facility was remarkably sophisticated, boasting modern heating and ventilation, dedicated faculty restrooms, gymnasiums for boys and girls, and a versatile assembly hall. The interior featured 12 standard classrooms alongside specialized spaces for a library, a vocational shop, and science labs for chemistry and physics.

In 1925, a larger high school opened about a half mile south on Broadway and took over the original name. The original building was rechristened the Pierson School to honor Frank R. Pierson, a prominent local leader and school board president. The building operated as an elementary school until its eventual closure in 1979.

After the school closed, the building was derelict for several years. In the 1980s, Italian architect and developer Rosaria Piomelli bought the building and converted it into residential apartments. Its original exterior, however, was preserved, and new windows were custom-made to historic specifications. In 1985, during its conversion into apartments, a fire caused significant damage to the roof and interior; however, the primary structure remained intact. The complex is now named Landmark Condominiums.

== See also ==
- National Register of Historic Places listings in northern Westchester County, New York
