= Dick Colman =

American football player and coach (1914–1982)

Biographical details
- Born: November 11, 1914; New York, New York, U.S.
- Died: April 5, 1982 (aged 67); Middlebury, Vermont, U.S.

Playing career
- 1935–1936: Williams

Coaching career (HC unless noted)
- 1937–1944: Williams (assistant)
- 1945–1956: Princeton (assistant)
- 1957–1968: Princeton

Administrative career (AD unless noted)
- 1969–1977: Middlebury

Head coaching record
- Overall: 75–33

Accomplishments and honors

Championships
- 4 Ivy League (1957, 1963–1964, 1966)
- College Football Hall of Fame; Inducted in 1990 (profile)

Richard Whiting Colman Jr. (November 11, 1914 – April 5, 1982) was an American football player and coach. He served as the head football coach at Princeton University from 1957 to 1968, compiling a record of 75–33. Colman had been the assistant to Princeton's previous coach, Charlie Caldwell; like Caldwell, Colman was known for his successful reliance on the single-wing formation offense, and ultimately he became the last major college coach to use the single wing, which Princeton gave up only after Colman's departure in 1969.

After retiring from coaching, Colman was the athletic director at Middlebury College from 1969 to 1977. Colman was inducted into the College Football Hall of Fame as a coach in 1990.

== Head coaching record ==
Year	Team	Overall	Conference	Standing	Bowl/playoffs	Coaches^{#}	AP^{°}
Princeton Tigers (Ivy League) (1957–1968)
1957	Princeton	7–2	6–1	1st			
1958	Princeton	6–3	5–2	T–2nd			
1959	Princeton	4–5	3–4	T–5th			
1960	Princeton	7–2	6–1	2nd			
1961	Princeton	5–4	5–2	T–3rd			
1962	Princeton	5–4	4–3	T–3rd			
1963	Princeton	7–2	5–2	T–1st			
1964	Princeton	9–0	7–0	1st		13	
1965	Princeton	8–1	6–1	2nd			
1966	Princeton	7–2	6–1	T–1st			
1967	Princeton	6–3	4–3	T–4th			
1968	Princeton	4–5	4–3	4th			
Princeton:		75–33	61–23				
Total:		75–33					
National championship Conference title Conference division title or championship game berth
^{#}Rankings from final Coaches Poll.; ^{°}Rankings from final AP Poll.
