= Maine Black Bears football =

Intercollegiate American football team for the University of Maine

2026 Maine Black Bears football team
- First season: 1892; 134 years ago
- Athletic director: Jude Killy
- Head coach: Jordan Stevens; 5th season, 15–31 (.326)
- Location: Orono, Maine
- Stadiums: Alfond Sports Stadium (capacity: 10,000)
- Field: Morse Field
- NCAA division: Division I FCS
- Conference: CAA Football
- Colors: Maine blue, white, and navy
- All-time record: 566–551–38 (.506)

Conference championships
- Yankee: 1949, 1951, 1952, 1961, 1965, 1974, 1982, 1987, 1989 A10: 2001, 2002 CAA: 2013, 2018
- Rivalries: New Hampshire (rivalry)
- Fight song: Stein Song / For Maine!
- Mascot: Bananas T. Bear
- Marching band: Pride of Maine Black Bear Marching Band
- Outfitter: New Balance
- Website: goblackbears.com/football

The Maine Black Bears football program is the intercollegiate American football team for the University of Maine located in the U.S. state of Maine. The team competes in the NCAA Division I Football Championship Subdivision (FCS) and are members of the Coastal Athletic Association Football Conference. Maine's first football team was fielded in 1892. The team plays its home games at the 8,419 seat Alfond Stadium in Orono, Maine.

== History ==
=== Conference affiliations ===
- 1892: Independent
- 1893–1946: Maine Intercollegiate Athletic Association
- 1947–1996: Yankee Conference
- 1997–2006: Atlantic 10 Conference
- 2007–present: Coastal Athletic Association Football Conference

== Playoffs ==
The Black Bears have appeared in the Division I-AA/FCS Playoffs eight times. They have a 5–8 record in playoff games.

Year	Round	Opponent	Result
1987	First Round	Georgia Southern	L 28–31
1989	First Round	Southwest Missouri State	L 35–38
2001	First Round; Quarterfinals	McNeese State; Northern Iowa	W 14–10; L 28–56
2002	First Round; Quarterfinals	Appalachian State; Georgia Southern	W 14–13; L 7–31
2008	First Round	Northern Iowa	L 15–40
2011	Second Round; Quarterfinals	Appalachian State; Georgia Southern	W 34–12; L 23–35
2013	Second Round	New Hampshire	L 27–41
2018	Second Round; Quarterfinals; Semifinals	Jacksonville State; Weber State; Eastern Washington	W 55–27; W 23–18; L 19–50

== Bowl games ==
Maine has participated in one bowl game. Their record is 0–1.

Season	Bowl	Opponent	Result
1965	Tangerine Bowl	East Carolina	L 0–31

== Conference championships ==
Maine has won thirteen conference championships, seven shared and six outright.

Season	Conference	Coach	Record	Conference record
1949†	Yankee Conference	David M. Nelson	2–4–1	2–0–1
1951	Yankee Conference	Harold Westerman	6–0–1	3–0–1
1952†	Yankee Conference	Harold Westerman	4–3	3–1
1961	Yankee Conference	Harold Westerman	8–0–1	5–0
1965	Yankee Conference	Harold Westerman	8–2	5–0
1974†	Yankee Conference	Walter Abbott	4–6	4–2
1982	Yankee Conference	Ron Rogerson	7–4	3–2
1987†	Yankee Conference	Tim Murphy	8–4	6–1
1989†	Yankee Conference	Tom Lichtenberg	9–3	6–2
2001†	Atlantic 10 Conference	Jack Cosgrove	9–3	7–2
2002†	Atlantic 10 Conference	Jack Cosgrove	11–3	7–2
2013	CAA Football	Jack Cosgrove	10–3	7–1
2018	CAA Football	Joe Harasymiak	8–3	7–1

† – Conference co-champions

== Notable former players ==
Notable alumni include:

- Sherrod Baltimore
- Jovan Belcher
- Mike Buck
- Accie Connor
- Stephen Cooper
- Jamil Demby
- Mike DeVito
- Nick DiPaolo
- Mike Flynn
- Brian Gaine
- John Huard
- Dan Jones
- Phil McGeoghan
- Brandon McGowan
- Kevin McMahan
- Kendall James
- Justin Perillo
- Jerron McMillian
- Matthew Mulligan
- Christophe Mulumba-Tshimanga
- Montell Owens
- Jim Reid
- Jeff Reinebold
- Patrick Ricard
- Ben Sirmans
- Justin Strzelczyk
- Lofa Tatupu

== Future non-conference opponents ==
Announced schedules as of March 9, 2026.

2026	2027	2028	2029	2030
at Appalachian State	Merrimack	at UCF	at Stonehill	at Boston College
Merrimack	at Penn State			Colgate
at Boston College	at Akron			
