= Howard/Samford Bulldogs football, 1960–1969 =

American college football seasons

The Howard/Samford Bulldogs football program, 1960–1969 represented Howard College, which became Samford University in 1966, during the 1960s in college football. During this time, the Bulldogs were led by four different head coaches and had an overall record for the decade of 57–33–5. During this decade, the Bulldogs competed as an independent and played their home games at Seibert Stadium on-campus in Homewood, Alabama.

From 1960 to 1962, Bobby Bowden served as head coach, and led the Bulldogs to an overall record of 22–5 and a loss in the 1962 Golden Isles Bowl during this period of his tenure. After his resignation in January 1963 to accept an assistant coaching position at Florida State, Bubba Scott was hired as the next head coach at Howard. Before his resignation in April 1966, Scott compiled an overall record of 13–13–2 as head coach of the Bulldogs.

In January 1966, Howard College officially became Samford University. In June 1966 John Lee Armstrong was hired as head coach at Samford, and he led the Bulldogs to an overall record of 20–9–2 and a victory in the Space City Classic during his three-year tenure. After his resignation, Armstrong's former assistant coach Wayne Grubb was promoted to head coach. Grubb led Samford to a 2–6–1 in 1969 to close out the decade.

== 1960 ==
1960 Howard Bulldogs football
- Conference: Independent
- Record: 8–1
- Head coach: Bobby Bowden (2nd season)
- Home stadium: Howard Stadium

1960 Southern non-major college football independents records
| | Conf. | | | Overall |
| Team | W | L | T | W | | L | | T |
|---|---|---|---|---|---|---|---|---|
| Washington and Lee | | – | | 8 | – | 0 | – | 1 |
| Arlington State | | – | | 9 | – | 2 | – | 0 |
| Howard (AL) | | – | | 8 | – | 1 | – | 0 |
| Louisville | | – | | 7 | – | 2 | – | 0 |
| Mississippi Southern | | – | | 6 | – | 4 | – | 0 |
| Sewanee | | – | | 4 | – | 3 | – | 1 |
| Abilene Christian | | – | | 5 | – | 5 | – | 0 |
| Chattanooga | | – | | 5 | – | 5 | – | 0 |
| Arkansas State | | – | | 4 | – | 5 | – | 0 |
| Tampa | | – | | 2 | – | 7 | – | 1 |
| Trinity (TX) | | – | | 2 | – | 7 | – | 1 |

The 1960 Howard Bulldogs football team was an American football team that represented Howard College (now known as Samford University) as an independent during the 1960 college football season. In their second year under head coach Bobby Bowden, the team compiled an 8–1 record. Howard played their home games on campus at Howard Stadium in Homewood, Alabama.

Schedule

| Date | Opponent | Site | Result | Attendance | Source |
|---|---|---|---|---|---|
| September 16 | Maryville (TN) | Howard Stadium; Homewood, AL | W 14–0 | | |
| September 23 | Sewanee | Howard Stadium; Homewood, AL | W 56–0 | | |
| October 1 | at Georgetown (KY) | Hinton Field; Georgetown, KY | W 40–0 | | |
| October 8 | Mississippi College^{†} | Howard Stadium; Homewood, AL | L 20–24 | | |
| October 15 | at Millsaps | Newell Field; Jackson, MS | W 42–0 | | |
| October 22 | Delta State | Howard Stadium; Homewood, AL | W 28–14 | | |
| November 5 | at Livingston State | Tiger Stadium; Livingston, AL | W 22–6 | | |
| November 12 | at Southwestern (TN) | Fargason Field; Memphis, TN | W 26–0 | | |
| November 18 | vs. Troy State | Cramton Bowl; Montgomery, AL | W 48–14 | 3,000–5,000 | |
^{†}Homecoming

== 1961 ==
1961 Howard Bulldogs football
- Conference: Independent
- Record: 7–2
- Head coach: Bobby Bowden (3rd season)
- Home stadium: Seibert Stadium

1961 Southern college football independents records
| | Conf. | | | Overall |
| Team | W | L | T | W | | L | | T |
|---|---|---|---|---|---|---|---|---|
| Washington and Lee | | – | | 9 | – | 0 | – | 0 |
| Tampa | | – | | 8 | – | 1 | – | 0 |
| Mississippi College | | – | | 8 | – | 1 | – | 0 |
| Mississippi Southern | | – | | 8 | – | 2 | – | 0 |
| Memphis State | | – | | 8 | – | 2 | – | 0 |
| Delta State | | – | | 7 | – | 2 | – | 1 |
| Howard (AL) | | – | | 7 | – | 2 | – | 0 |
| South Carolina Trade | | – | | 6 | – | 2 | – | 0 |
| Maryville (TN) | | – | | 6 | – | 2 | – | 0 |
| Sewanee | | – | | 5 | – | 2 | – | 1 |
| Miles | | – | | 5 | – | 2 | – | 0 |
| Navy | | – | | 7 | – | 3 | – | 0 |
| Arlington State | | – | | 7 | – | 3 | – | 0 |
| Louisville | | – | | 6 | – | 3 | – | 0 |
| Miami (FL) | | – | | 7 | – | 4 | – | 0 |
| McMurry | | – | | 6 | – | 4 | – | 0 |
| Houston | | – | | 5 | – | 4 | – | 1 |
| Livingstone | | – | | 5 | – | 4 | – | 0 |
| Southwestern (TN) | | – | | 4 | – | 4 | – | 0 |
| Emory & Henry | | – | | 4 | – | 4 | – | 0 |
| Florida State | | – | | 4 | – | 5 | – | 1 |
| Norfolk State | | – | | 3 | – | 4 | – | 0 |
| Abilene Christian | | – | | 4 | – | 6 | – | 0 |
| Chattanooga | | – | | 4 | – | 6 | – | 0 |
| Georgetown (KY) | | – | | 2 | – | 3 | – | 1 |
| Arkansas State | | – | | 3 | – | 6 | – | 0 |
| Austin | | – | | 2 | – | 7 | – | 0 |
| Trinity (TX) | | – | | 2 | – | 7 | – | 0 |
| Millsaps | | – | | 1 | – | 5 | – | 2 |
| Centre | | – | | 1 | – | 7 | – | 0 |

The 1961 Howard Bulldogs football team was an American football team that represented Howard College (now known as Samford University) as an independent during the 1961 college football season. In their third year under head coach Bobby Bowden, the team compiled an 7–2 record. Howard played their home games on campus at Seibert Stadium in Homewood, Alabama.

Schedule

| Date | Opponent | Site | Result | Attendance | Source |
|---|---|---|---|---|---|
| September 23 | at Memphis Navy | Millington High School Stadium; Millington, TN | W 60–0 | | |
| September 30 | Georgetown (KY) | Seibert Stadium; Homewood, AL | W 64–6 | | |
| October 7 | at Wofford | Snyder Field; Spartanburg, SC | W 16–13 | | |
| October 14 | at Furman | Sirrine Stadium; Greenville, SC | L 14–21 | 9,500 | |
| October 21 | Delta State^{†} | Seibert Stadium; Homewood, AL | W 20–14 | 5,500 | |
| October 28 | at Carson–Newman | McCown Field; Jefferson City, TN | W 18–7 | | |
| November 4 | at Mississippi College | Robinson Field; Clinton, MS | L 14–15 | | |
| November 11 | Southwestern (TN) | Seibert Stadium; Homewood, AL | W 34–7 | | |
| November 18 | at Troy State | Veterans Memorial Stadium; Troy, AL | W 80–0 | 5,000 | |
^{†}Homecoming

== 1962 ==
1962 Howard Bulldogs football

Golden Isles Bowl, L 14–21 vs. McNeese State
- Conference: Independent
- Record: 7–2
- Head coach: Bobby Bowden (4th season)
- Home stadium: Seibert Stadium

1962 NCAA College Division independents football records
| | Conf. | | | Overall |
| Team | W | L | T | W | | L | | T |
|---|---|---|---|---|---|---|---|---|
| Cal Poly Pomona | | – | | 9 | – | 1 | – | 0 |
| Southern Miss | | – | | 9 | – | 1 | – | 0 |
| Drake | | – | | 8 | – | 2 | – | 0 |
| Howard (AL) | | – | | 7 | – | 2 | – | 0 |
| Southern Connecticut State | | – | | 7 | – | 2 | – | 0 |
| St. Norbert | | – | | 7 | – | 2 | – | 0 |
| Hawaii | | – | | 6 | – | 2 | – | 0 |
| Montana State | | – | | 7 | – | 3 | – | 0 |
| Arkansas State | | – | | 6 | – | 3 | – | 0 |
| Northern Michigan | | – | | 6 | – | 3 | – | 0 |
| Northeastern | | – | | 5 | – | 3 | – | 0 |
| Wabash | | – | | 5 | – | 3 | – | 1 |
| Abilene Christian | | – | | 6 | – | 4 | – | 0 |
| East Carolina | | – | | 5 | – | 4 | – | 0 |
| Weber State | | – | | 5 | – | 4 | – | 0 |
| Wheaton (IL) | | – | | 5 | – | 4 | – | 0 |
| Chattanooga | | – | | 5 | – | 5 | – | 0 |
| Arlington State | | – | | 4 | – | 6 | – | 0 |
| Southern Illinois | | – | | 4 | – | 6 | – | 0 |
| Findlay | | – | | 4 | – | 5 | – | 0 |
| Tampa | | – | | 3 | – | 4 | – | 2 |
| UC Riverside | | – | | 3 | – | 5 | – | 0 |
| Idaho State | | – | | 3 | – | 6 | – | 0 |
| Eastern Michigan | | – | | 2 | – | 5 | – | 0 |
| Mississippi Vocational | | – | | 2 | – | 5 | – | 0 |
| Santa Clara | | – | | 2 | – | 6 | – | 0 |
| Carnegie Tech | | – | | 1 | – | 7 | – | 0 |
| Rose Poly | | – | | 1 | – | 7 | – | 0 |
| Union (NY) | | – | | 1 | – | 7 | – | 0 |
| Trinity (TX) | | – | | 1 | – | 8 | – | 0 |

The 1962 Howard Bulldogs football team was an American football team that represented Howard College (now known as Samford University) as an independent during the 1962 NCAA College Division football season. In their fourth year under head coach Bobby Bowden, the team compiled an 7–2 record. Howard played their home games on campus at Seibert Stadium in Homewood, Alabama.

In January 1963, Bowden resigned as head coach at Howard to accept an assistant coaching position at Florida State.

Schedule

| Date | Opponent | Site | Result | Attendance | Source |
|---|---|---|---|---|---|
| September 15 | at Chattanooga | Chamberlain Field; Chattanooga, TN | W 22–12 | 7,500 | |
| September 29 | UNAM | Seibert Stadium; Homewood, AL | W 40–0 | 4,000 | |
| October 6 | at Louisiana College | Alumni Field; Pineville, LA | W 14–12 | 5,000 | |
| October 13 | at Furman | Sirrine Stadium; Greenville, SC | W 14–7 | 9,000 | |
| October 20 | at Delta State | Delta Field; Cleveland, MS | L 8–15 | | |
| October 27 | Carson–Newman | Seibert Stadium; Homewood, AL | W 47–0 | 6,000 | |
| November 3 | Mississippi College^{†} | Seibert Stadium; Homewood, AL | W 21–3 | 4,000 | |
| November 10 | Wofford | Seibert Stadium; Homewood, AL | W 34–28 | | |
| December 1 | vs. McNeese State | Brunswick, GA (Golden Isles Bowl) | L 14–21 | | |
^{†}Homecoming

== 1963 ==
1963 Howard Bulldogs football
- Conference: Independent
- Record: 5–3–1
- Head coach: Bubba Scott (1st season)
- Home stadium: Seibert Stadium

1963 NCAA College Division independents football records
| | Conf. | | | Overall |
| Team | W | L | T | W | | L | | T |
|---|---|---|---|---|---|---|---|---|
| East Carolina | | – | | 9 | – | 1 | – | 0 |
| Abilene Christian | | – | | 8 | – | 1 | – | 0 |
| Northeastern | | – | | 8 | – | 1 | – | 0 |
| Wheaton (IL) | | – | | 8 | – | 1 | – | 0 |
| Mississippi Vocational | | – | | 6 | – | 3 | – | 0 |
| Santa Clara | | – | | 6 | – | 3 | – | 0 |
| St. Norbert | | – | | 6 | – | 3 | – | 0 |
| Arizona State–Flagstaff | | – | | 5 | – | 3 | – | 1 |
| Howard (AL) | | – | | 5 | – | 3 | – | 1 |
| Cortland | | – | | 4 | – | 3 | – | 0 |
| Lamar Tech | | – | | 5 | – | 4 | – | 0 |
| Parsons | | – | | 5 | – | 4 | – | 0 |
| Drake | | – | | 4 | – | 4 | – | 0 |
| Hawaii | | – | | 5 | – | 5 | – | 0 |
| Northern Michigan | | – | | 4 | – | 4 | – | 1 |
| Southern Connecticut State | | – | | 4 | – | 4 | – | 0 |
| Wabash | | – | | 4 | – | 4 | – | 1 |
| Tampa | | – | | 4 | – | 5 | – | 1 |
| Southern Illinois | | – | | 4 | – | 5 | – | 0 |
| UC Riverside | | – | | 4 | – | 5 | – | 0 |
| UC Santa Barbara | | – | | 4 | – | 5 | – | 0 |
| Chattanooga | | – | | 4 | – | 6 | – | 0 |
| Lake Forest | | – | | 2 | – | 4 | – | 1 |
| Hardin–Simmons | | – | | 2 | – | 6 | – | 1 |
| Arkansas State | | – | | 2 | – | 6 | – | 0 |
| Eastern Michigan | | – | | 2 | – | 6 | – | 0 |
| Rose Poly | | – | | 2 | – | 6 | – | 0 |
| Union (NY) | | – | | 2 | – | 6 | – | 0 |
| Cal Poly Pomona | | – | | 2 | – | 7 | – | 0 |
| Trinity (TX) | | – | | 1 | – | 6 | – | 1 |
| Carnegie Tech | | – | | 1 | – | 6 | – | 0 |
| Arlington State | | – | | 1 | – | 8 | – | 0 |

The 1963 Howard Bulldogs football team was an American football team that represented Howard College (now known as Samford University) as an independent during the 1963 NCAA College Division football season. In their first year under head coach Bubba Scott, the team compiled a 5–3–1 record. Howard played their home games on campus at Seibert Stadium in Homewood, Alabama.

In February 1963, Scott was hired as head coach at Howard, and replaced Bobby Bowden. Prior to his arrival at Howard, Scott served as head coach at Haleyville High School where he compiled an overall record of 76–21–3 during his 14-year tenure.

Schedule

| Date | Opponent | Site | Result | Attendance | Source |
|---|---|---|---|---|---|
| September 21 | at Mississippi State | Scott Field; Starkville, MS | L 0–43 | 11,000 | |
| September 28 | Southeastern Louisiana | Seibert Stadium; Homewood, AL | W 7–0 | 7,000 | |
| October 5 | at McNeese State | Wildcat Stadium; Lake Charles, LA | L 0–28 | 5,500 | |
| October 12 | at Northeast Louisiana State | Brown Stadium; Monroe, LA | W 13–7 | 3,600 | |
| October 19 | Delta State^{†} | Seibert Stadium; Homewood, AL | W 6–0 | 6,000 | |
| October 26 | at UNAM | Estadio Universitario; Mexico City, Mexico | W 26–14 | 25,000 | |
| November 2 | at Mississippi College | Robinson Field; Clinton, MS | T 3–3 | 6,000 | |
| November 9 | at Carson–Newman | McCown Field; Jefferson City, TN | W 9–0 | | |
| November 16 | Louisiana College | Seibert Stadium; Homewood, AL | L 16–17 | 2,500 | |
^{†}Homecoming

== 1964 ==
1964 Howard Bulldogs football
- Conference: Independent
- Record: 4–4–1
- Head coach: Bubba Scott (2nd season)
- Home stadium: Seibert Stadium

1964 NCAA College Division independents football records
| | Conf. | | | Overall |
| Team | W | L | T | W | | L | | T |
|---|---|---|---|---|---|---|---|---|
| Montclair State | | – | | 7 | – | 0 | – | 0 |
| East Carolina | | – | | 9 | – | 1 | – | 0 |
| Cortland | | – | | 8 | – | 1 | – | 0 |
| Santa Clara | | – | | 7 | – | 2 | – | 0 |
| Chattanooga | | – | | 7 | – | 3 | – | 0 |
| Parsons | | – | | 6 | – | 3 | – | 0 |
| St. Norbert | | – | | 5 | – | 2 | – | 2 |
| Northeastern | | – | | 5 | – | 3 | – | 0 |
| Northern Michigan | | – | | 5 | – | 3 | – | 0 |
| Drake | | – | | 6 | – | 4 | – | 0 |
| Mississippi Valley State | | – | | 5 | – | 4 | – | 0 |
| Arizona State–Flagstaff | | – | | 5 | – | 4 | – | 0 |
| Howard (AL) | | – | | 4 | – | 4 | – | 1 |
| Wabash | | – | | 3 | – | 3 | – | 2 |
| Hawaii | | – | | 4 | – | 5 | – | 0 |
| Milwaukee | | – | | 4 | – | 5 | – | 0 |
| Tampa | | – | | 4 | – | 6 | – | 0 |
| Lake Forest | | – | | 3 | – | 5 | – | 0 |
| UC Santa Barbara | | – | | 4 | – | 7 | – | 0 |
| Southern Connecticut State | | – | | 2 | – | 6 | – | 1 |
| Rose Poly | | – | | 2 | – | 6 | – | 0 |
| UC Riverside | | – | | 2 | – | 7 | – | 0 |
| Wheaton (IL) | | – | | 2 | – | 7 | – | 0 |
| Southern Illinois | | – | | 2 | – | 8 | – | 0 |
| Cal Poly Pomona | | – | | 1 | – | 6 | – | 0 |
| Carnegie Tech | | – | | 1 | – | 8 | – | 0 |
| Pacific (CA) | | – | | 1 | – | 9 | – | 0 |

The 1964 Howard Bulldogs football team was an American football team that represented Howard College (now known as Samford University) as an independent during the 1964 NCAA College Division football season. In their second year under head coach Bubba Scott, the team compiled a 4–4–1 record. Howard played their home games on campus at Seibert Stadium in Homewood, Alabama.

Schedule

| Date | Opponent | Site | Result | Attendance | Source |
|---|---|---|---|---|---|
| September 11 | at Pensacola Navy | Kane Field; Pensacola, FL | T 7–7 | 3,000 | |
| September 19 | Troy State | Seibert Stadium; Homewood, AL | W 33–13 | 8,000 | |
| September 26 | at East Carolina | Ficklen Memorial Stadium; Greenville, NC | L 20–31 | 13,000 | |
| October 3 | McNeese State | Seibert Stadium; Homewood, AL | L 6–7 | 4,000 | |
| October 10 | Northeast Louisiana State | Seibert Stadium; Homewood, AL | W 20–17 | 4,200 | |
| October 17 | at Delta State | Delta Field; Cleveland, MS | W 26–8 | 4,500 | |
| October 31 | Mississippi College^{†} | Seibert Stadium; Homewood, AL | W 24–7 | | |
| November 7 | Carson–Newman | Seibert Stadium; Homewood, AL | L 0–3 | | |
| November 14 | at Chattanooga | Chamberlain Field; Chattanooga, TN | L 13–28 | | |
^{†}Homecoming

== 1965 ==
1965 Howard Bulldogs football
- Conference: Independent
- Record: 4–6
- Head coach: Bubba Scott (3rd season)
- Home stadium: Seibert Stadium

1965 NCAA College Division independents football records
| | Conf. | | | Overall |
| Team | W | L | T | W | | L | | T |
|---|---|---|---|---|---|---|---|---|
| Springfield | | – | | 9 | – | 0 | – | 0 |
| Ithaca | | – | | 8 | – | 0 | – | 0 |
| Parsons | | – | | 8 | – | 1 | – | 0 |
| Santa Clara | | – | | 8 | – | 1 | – | 0 |
| UC Santa Barbara | | – | | 8 | – | 2 | – | 0 |
| Cortland | | – | | 7 | – | 2 | – | 0 |
| Wabash | | – | | 7 | – | 2 | – | 0 |
| Northeastern | | – | | 6 | – | 2 | – | 0 |
| UC Riverside | | – | | 6 | – | 2 | – | 0 |
| Tampa | | – | | 6 | – | 2 | – | 1 |
| Northern Michigan | | – | | 7 | – | 3 | – | 0 |
| Mississippi Valley State | | – | | 6 | – | 3 | – | 0 |
| St. Norbert | | – | | 6 | – | 3 | – | 0 |
| Rose Poly | | – | | 5 | – | 3 | – | 0 |
| Drake | | – | | 6 | – | 4 | – | 0 |
| Chattanooga | | – | | 5 | – | 4 | – | 1 |
| Arizona State–Flagstaff | | – | | 5 | – | 4 | – | 1 |
| Lake Forest | | – | | 4 | – | 4 | – | 0 |
| Cal Poly Pomona | | – | | 4 | – | 5 | – | 0 |
| Howard (AL) | | – | | 4 | – | 6 | – | 0 |
| Portland State | | – | | 4 | – | 6 | – | 0 |
| Colorado College | | – | | 3 | – | 5 | – | 0 |
| Milwaukee | | – | | 2 | – | 6 | – | 0 |
| Southern Illinois | | – | | 2 | – | 8 | – | 0 |
| Pacific (CA) | | – | | 2 | – | 8 | – | 0 |
| Hawaii | | – | | 1 | – | 8 | – | 1 |
| Carnegie Tech | | – | | 1 | – | 7 | – | 0 |
| Wheaton (IL) | | – | | 1 | – | 8 | – | 0 |

The 1965 Howard Bulldogs football team was an American football team that represented Howard College (now known as Samford University) as an independent during the 1965 NCAA College Division football season. In their third year under head coach Bubba Scott, the team compiled a 4–6 record. Howard played their home games on campus at Seibert Stadium in Homewood, Alabama.

In April 1966, Scott resigned as head coach to become the Executive Secretary of the Alabama High School Athletic Association.

Schedule

| Date | Opponent | Site | Result | Attendance | Source |
|---|---|---|---|---|---|
| September 18 | at Troy State | Veterans Memorial Stadium; Troy, AL | W 37–6 | 4,200 | |
| September 25 | at Jacksonville State | Paul Snow Stadium; Jacksonville, AL (rivalry) | L 3–23 | | |
| October 2 | Louisiana College | Seibert Stadium; Homewood, AL | W 26–2 | | |
| October 9 | at Southeastern Louisiana | Strawberry Stadium; Hammond, LA | L 7–13 | | |
| October 16 | Delta State | Seibert Stadium; Homewood, AL | L 0–17 | | |
| October 23 | Southwestern Louisiana^{†} | Seibert Stadium; Homewood, AL | L 0–7 | 4,000 | |
| October 28 | at Mississippi College | Robinson Field; Clinton, MS | W 20–12 | | |
| November 6 | at Carson–Newman | McCown Field; Jefferson City, TN | W 6–3 | | |
| November 13 | Chattanooga | Seibert Stadium; Homewood, AL | L 10–25 | 2,000 | |
| November 20 | No. 5 East Carolina | Seibert Stadium; Homewood, AL | L 10–35 | 3,000 | |
^{†}Homecoming; Rankings from AP Poll released prior to the game

== 1966 ==
1966 Samford Bulldogs football
- Conference: Independent
- Record: 6–3–1
- Head coach: John Lee Armstrong (1st season)
- Home stadium: Seibert Stadium

1966 NCAA College Division independents football records
| | Conf. | | | Overall |
| Team | W | L | T | W | | L | | T |
|---|---|---|---|---|---|---|---|---|
| St. Norbert | | – | | 7 | – | 1 | – | 1 |
| Parsons | | – | | 9 | – | 2 | – | 0 |
| Drake | | – | | 8 | – | 2 | – | 0 |
| Northern Illinois | | – | | 8 | – | 2 | – | 0 |
| Indiana (PA) | | – | | 7 | – | 2 | – | 0 |
| Santa Clara | | – | | 7 | – | 2 | – | 0 |
| Cortland | | – | | 6 | – | 2 | – | 0 |
| Northeastern | | – | | 6 | – | 2 | – | 0 |
| Akron | | – | | 6 | – | 3 | – | 0 |
| Northern Michigan | | – | | 6 | – | 3 | – | 1 |
| Samford | | – | | 6 | – | 3 | – | 1 |
| Carnegie Tech | | – | | 5 | – | 3 | – | 0 |
| Eastern Michigan | | – | | 5 | – | 3 | – | 1 |
| Ashland | | – | | 5 | – | 3 | – | 2 |
| Northern Arizona | | – | | 6 | – | 4 | – | 0 |
| UC Santa Barbara | | – | | 6 | – | 4 | – | 0 |
| Wheaton (IL) | | – | | 5 | – | 4 | – | 0 |
| Boston University | | – | | 5 | – | 5 | – | 0 |
| Cal Poly Pomona | | – | | 5 | – | 5 | – | 0 |
| Chattanooga | | – | | 5 | – | 5 | – | 0 |
| Colorado College | | – | | 4 | – | 4 | – | 0 |
| Wabash | | – | | 4 | – | 4 | – | 1 |
| Milwaukee | | – | | 4 | – | 5 | – | 1 |
| Southern Illinois | | – | | 4 | – | 5 | – | 1 |
| UC Riverside | | – | | 4 | – | 5 | – | 0 |
| Tampa | | – | | 4 | – | 5 | – | 0 |
| Rose Poly | | – | | 3 | – | 4 | – | 1 |
| Hawaii | | – | | 4 | – | 6 | – | 0 |
| Portland State | | – | | 4 | – | 6 | – | 0 |
| Mississippi Valley State | | – | | 3 | – | 6 | – | 0 |
| Lake Forest | | – | | 2 | – | 5 | – | 0 |
| Wayne State (MI) | | – | | 2 | – | 6 | – | 0 |

The 1966 Samford Bulldogs football team was an American football team that represented Samford University as an independent during the 1966 NCAA College Division football season. In their first year under head coach John Lee Armstrong, the team compiled a 6–3–1 record. Samford played their home games on campus at Seibert Stadium in Homewood, Alabama. This season marked the first the Bulldogs played as Samford and not as Howard following its formal name change in January 1966.

In June 1966, Armstrong was hired as head coach at Howard, and replaced Bubba Scott. Prior to his arrival at Howard, Armstrong served as head coach at Woodlawn High School for their 1965 season.

Schedule

| Date | Opponent | Site | Result | Attendance | Source |
|---|---|---|---|---|---|
| September 17 | Troy State | Seibert Stadium; Homewood, AL | W 14–13 | 5,000 | |
| September 24 | Jacksonville State | Seibert Stadium; Homewood, AL (rivalry) | W 28–14 | 6,000 | |
| October 1 | at Louisiana College | Alumni Field; Pineville, LA | W 17–3 | 3,000 | |
| October 8 | Guilford | Seibert Stadium; Homewood, AL | W 20–7 | 5,200 | |
| October 15 | at Delta State | Delta Field; Cleveland, MS | L 14–31 | | |
| October 22 | at Southwestern Louisiana | McNaspy Stadium; Lafayette, LA | L 3–6 | 9,500 | |
| October 29 | Mississippi College^{†} | Seibert Stadium; Homewood, AL | W 45–21 | 6,000 | |
| November 5 | Carson–Newman | Seibert Stadium; Homewood, AL | L 13–14 | 3,000 | |
| November 12 | at Furman | Sirrine Stadium; Greenville, SC | W 17–7 | 7,500 | |
| November 19 | at Florence State | Braly Municipal Stadium; Florence, AL | T 31–31 | 5,000 | |
^{†}Homecoming

== 1967 ==
1967 Samford Bulldogs football

Space City Classic, W 20–7 vs. Arkansas A&M
- Conference: Independent
- Record: 8–2–1
- Head coach: John Lee Armstrong (2nd season)
- Home stadium: Seibert Stadium

1967 NCAA College Division independents football records
| | Conf. | | | Overall |
| Team | W | L | T | W | | L | | T |
|---|---|---|---|---|---|---|---|---|
| Ashland | | – | | 8 | – | 0 | – | 1 |
| Northern Michigan | | – | | 9 | – | 1 | – | 0 |
| Indiana (PA) | | – | | 8 | – | 1 | – | 0 |
| Santa Clara | | – | | 8 | – | 1 | – | 0 |
| Northeastern | | – | | 7 | – | 1 | – | 0 |
| Wheaton (IL) | | – | | 7 | – | 2 | – | 0 |
| Samford | | – | | 8 | – | 2 | – | 1 |
| Wayne State (MI) | | – | | 6 | – | 2 | – | 0 |
| Chattanooga | | – | | 7 | – | 3 | – | 0 |
| Eastern Michigan | | – | | 6 | – | 3 | – | 0 |
| Tennessee A&I | | – | | 6 | – | 3 | – | 0 |
| Parsons | | – | | 6 | – | 3 | – | 1 |
| Kentucky State | | – | | 5 | – | 3 | – | 1 |
| Hawaii | | – | | 6 | – | 4 | – | 0 |
| St. Norbert | | – | | 5 | – | 4 | – | 0 |
| Akron | | – | | 4 | – | 4 | – | 1 |
| Carnegie Mellon | | – | | 4 | – | 4 | – | 0 |
| Cortland | | – | | 4 | – | 4 | – | 0 |
| Northern Arizona | | – | | 5 | – | 5 | – | 0 |
| Northern Illinois | | – | | 5 | – | 5 | – | 0 |
| UC Riverside | | – | | 4 | – | 4 | – | 1 |
| UC Santa Barbara | | – | | 5 | – | 5 | – | 0 |
| Drake | | – | | 4 | – | 5 | – | 0 |
| Pacific (CA) | | – | | 4 | – | 5 | – | 0 |
| Portland State | | – | | 4 | – | 6 | – | 0 |
| Lincoln (MO) | | – | | 3 | – | 5 | – | 0 |
| Boston University | | – | | 3 | – | 6 | – | 0 |
| Lake Forest | | – | | 3 | – | 6 | – | 0 |
| Milwaukee | | – | | 3 | – | 6 | – | 0 |
| Mississippi Valley State | | – | | 3 | – | 6 | – | 0 |
| Southern Illinois | | – | | 3 | – | 7 | – | 0 |
| Colorado College | | – | | 2 | – | 5 | – | 1 |
| Rose Poly | | – | | 1 | – | 6 | – | 2 |
| Tampa | | – | | 2 | – | 7 | – | 0 |
| Wabash | | – | | 2 | – | 7 | – | 0 |
| Cal Poly Pomona | | – | | 2 | – | 8 | – | 0 |

The 1967 Samford Bulldogs football team was an American football team that represented Samford University as an independent during the 1967 NCAA College Division football season. In their second year under head coach John Lee Armstrong, the team compiled a 8–2–1 record. Samford played their home games on campus at Seibert Stadium in Homewood, Alabama.

Schedule

| Date | Opponent | Site | Result | Attendance | Source |
|---|---|---|---|---|---|
| September 16 | at Troy State | Veterans Memorial Stadium; Troy, AL | L 14–17 | 6,000 | |
| September 23 | at Jacksonville State | Paul Snow Stadium; Jacksonville, AL (rivalry) | W 20–13 | | |
| September 30 | Louisiana College | Seibert Stadium; Homewood, AL | W 20–3 | 4,000 | |
| October 14 | Delta State | Seibert Stadium; Homewood, AL | W 34–10 | 6,000 | |
| October 21 | at Georgetown (KY) | Hinton Field; Georgetown, KY | W 40–13 | | |
| October 28 | at Mississippi College | Robinson Field; Clinton, MS | W 28–21 | 3,000 | |
| November 4 | Chattanooga | Seibert Stadium; Homewood, AL | L 0–28 | 5,200 | |
| November 11 | Furman^{†} | Seibert Stadium; Homewood, AL | W 42–28 | | |
| November 18 | vs. Florence State | Milton Frank Stadium; Huntsville, AL | T 14–14 | | |
| December 2 | Livingston State | Seibert Stadium; Homewood, AL | W 51–27 | 3,000 | |
| December 9 | vs. Arkansas A&M | Milton Frank Stadium; Huntsville, AL (Space City Classic) | W 20–7 | 3,000 | |
^{†}Homecoming

== 1968 ==
1968 Samford Bulldogs football
- Conference: Independent
- Record: 6–4
- Head coach: John Lee Armstrong (3rd season)
- Home stadium: Seibert Stadium

1968 NCAA College Division independents football records
| | Conf. | | | Overall |
| Team | W | L | T | W | | L | | T |
|---|---|---|---|---|---|---|---|---|
| No. 2 San Diego State | | – | | 9 | – | 0 | – | 1 |
| No. 3 Chattanooga | | – | | 9 | – | 1 | – | 0 |
| Indiana State | | – | | 9 | – | 1 | – | 0 |
| Indiana (PA) | | – | | 9 | – | 1 | – | 0 |
| Nevada Southern | | – | | 8 | – | 1 | – | 0 |
| Ashland | | – | | 8 | – | 2 | – | 0 |
| No. 7 Eastern Michigan | | – | | 8 | – | 2 | – | 0 |
| Lincoln (MO) | | – | | 8 | – | 2 | – | 0 |
| St. Norbert | | – | | 6 | – | 2 | – | 1 |
| Tennessee State | | – | | 6 | – | 2 | – | 1 |
| UC Riverside | | – | | 6 | – | 2 | – | 1 |
| Hawaii | | – | | 7 | – | 3 | – | 0 |
| No. 14 Tampa | | – | | 7 | – | 3 | – | 0 |
| No. 17 Akron | | – | | 7 | – | 3 | – | 1 |
| Northeastern | | – | | 6 | – | 3 | – | 0 |
| Southern Illinois | | – | | 6 | – | 3 | – | 0 |
| Cortland | | – | | 5 | – | 3 | – | 0 |
| Boston University | | – | | 5 | – | 3 | – | 1 |
| Northern Arizona | | – | | 6 | – | 4 | – | 0 |
| Pacific (CA) | | – | | 6 | – | 4 | – | 0 |
| Samford | | – | | 6 | – | 4 | – | 0 |
| Northern Michigan | | – | | 5 | – | 4 | – | 0 |
| Parsons | | – | | 5 | – | 4 | – | 0 |
| Wheaton (IL) | | – | | 5 | – | 4 | – | 0 |
| Drake | | – | | 5 | – | 5 | – | 0 |
| UC Santa Barbara | | – | | 4 | – | 4 | – | 1 |
| Santa Clara | | – | | 4 | – | 5 | – | 0 |
| Portland State | | – | | 4 | – | 6 | – | 0 |
| Wayne State (MI) | | – | | 3 | – | 6 | – | 0 |
| Wabash | | – | | 3 | – | 6 | – | 0 |
| Colorado College | | – | | 2 | – | 6 | – | 0 |
| Kentucky State | | – | | 2 | – | 7 | – | 0 |
| Milwaukee | | – | | 2 | – | 7 | – | 0 |
| Lake Forest | | – | | 2 | – | 8 | – | 0 |
| Northern Illinois | | – | | 2 | – | 8 | – | 0 |
| Mississippi Valley State | | – | | 1 | – | 7 | – | 0 |
| UC San Diego | | – | | 0 | – | 7 | – | 0 |
| Rose Poly | | – | | 0 | – | 8 | – | 0 |
| Cal Poly Pomona | | – | | 0 | – | 10 | – | 0 |
Rankings from AP small college poll

The 1968 Samford Bulldogs football team was an American football team that represented Samford University as an independent during the 1968 NCAA College Division football season. In their third year under head coach John Lee Armstrong, the team compiled a 6–4 record. Samford played their home games on campus at Seibert Stadium in Homewood, Alabama.

In June 1968, Armstrong resigned as head coach to a full-time position as an assistant professor at Samford in their Health and Physical Education Division.

Schedule

| Date | Opponent | Site | Result | Attendance | Source |
|---|---|---|---|---|---|
| September 14 | Troy State | Seibert Stadium; Homewood, AL | L 31–49 | | |
| September 21 | Jacksonville State | Seibert Stadium; Homewood, AL (rivalry) | W 20–14 | 6,000 | |
| October 5 | at Louisiana College | Alumni Field; Pineville, LA | W 30–3 | 3,000 | |
| October 12 | at Guilford | Armfield Athletic Center; Greensboro, NC | W 26–23 | 2,000 | |
| October 19 | Georgetown (KY) | Seibert Stadium; Homewood, AL | W 43–7 | 4,000 | |
| October 26 | Mississippi College^{†} | Seibert Stadium; Homewood, AL | W 41–0 | 5,000 | |
| November 2 | at Florence State | Braly Municipal Stadium; Florence, AL | L 10–36 | | |
| November 9 | at Furman | Sirrine Stadium; Greenville, SC | W 17–12 | 1,000 | |
| November 23 | at No. 4 Chattanooga | Chamberlain Field; Chattanooga, TN | L 7–40 | 5,000–7,500 | |
| November 28 | at Livingston | Tiger Stadium; Livingston, AL | L 16–22 | | |
^{†}Homecoming; Rankings from AP Poll released prior to the game

== 1969 ==
1969 Samford Bulldogs football
- Conference: Independent
- Record: 2–6–1
- Head coach: Wayne Grubb (1st season)
- Home stadium: Seibert Stadium

1969 NCAA College Division independents football records
| | Conf. | | | Overall |
| Team | W | L | T | W | | L | | T |
|---|---|---|---|---|---|---|---|---|
| No. 3 Akron | | – | | 9 | – | 1 | – | 0 |
| Indiana (PA) | | – | | 8 | – | 1 | – | 0 |
| Boston University | | – | | 9 | – | 2 | – | 0 |
| No. 9 Tampa | | – | | 8 | – | 2 | – | 0 |
| Tennessee State | | – | | 7 | – | 1 | – | 1 |
| Colorado College | | – | | 6 | – | 2 | – | 0 |
| Drake | | – | | 7 | – | 2 | – | 2 |
| Northern Arizona | | – | | 7 | – | 3 | – | 0 |
| Mankato State | | – | | 6 | – | 3 | – | 0 |
| Hawaii | | – | | 6 | – | 3 | – | 1 |
| Indiana State | | – | | 6 | – | 3 | – | 1 |
| Ashland | | – | | 5 | – | 3 | – | 1 |
| Lincoln (MO) | | – | | 5 | – | 3 | – | 1 |
| Portland State | | – | | 6 | – | 4 | – | 0 |
| Santa Clara | | – | | 6 | – | 4 | – | 0 |
| UNLV | | – | | 6 | – | 4 | – | 0 |
| Eastern Michigan | | – | | 5 | – | 4 | – | 0 |
| St. Norbert | | – | | 5 | – | 4 | – | 0 |
| Cortland | | – | | 4 | – | 4 | – | 0 |
| Northern Michigan | | – | | 5 | – | 5 | – | 0 |
| Nevada | | – | | 5 | – | 5 | – | 0 |
| Rose Poly | | – | | 4 | – | 4 | – | 0 |
| Southern Illinois | | – | | 5 | – | 5 | – | 0 |
| Wayne State (MI) | | – | | 4 | – | 4 | – | 0 |
| Chattanooga | | – | | 4 | – | 6 | – | 0 |
| Chicago | | – | | 2 | – | 4 | – | 0 |
| Milwaukee | | – | | 3 | – | 6 | – | 0 |
| Northeastern | | – | | 3 | – | 6 | – | 0 |
| Wabash | | – | | 3 | – | 6 | – | 0 |
| Wheaton (IL) | | – | | 3 | – | 6 | – | 0 |
| Samford | | – | | 2 | – | 6 | – | 1 |
| Lake Forest | | – | | 2 | – | 6 | – | 0 |
| Parsons | | – | | 2 | – | 8 | – | 0 |
| Kentucky State | | – | | 0 | – | 8 | – | 0 |
Rankings from AP small college poll

The 1969 Samford Bulldogs football team was an American football team that represented Samford University as an independent during the 1969 NCAA College Division football season. In their first year under head coach Wayne Grubb, the team compiled a 2–6–1 record. Samford played their home games on campus at Seibert Stadium in Homewood, Alabama.

In June 1969, Grubb was hired as head coach at Howard, and replaced John Lee Armstrong. Prior to his being promoted to head coach, Grubb served as an assistant coach at Samford under Armstrong.

Schedule

| Date | Opponent | Site | Result | Attendance | Source |
|---|---|---|---|---|---|
| September 13 | vs. Troy State | Rip Hewes Stadium; Dothan, AL | L 7–35 | 10,000 | |
| September 20 | at Jacksonville State | Paul Snow Stadium; Jacksonville, AL (rivalry) | L 10–20 | 8,200 | |
| September 27 | at Pensacola Navy | Kane Field; Pensacola, FL | L 15–21 | | |
| October 11 | Livingston | Seibert Stadium; Homewood, AL | T 30–30 | 6,000 | |
| October 18 | Furman | Seibert Stadium; Homewood, AL | W 34–14 | 2,800 | |
| October 25 | at Mississippi College | Robinson Field; Clinton, MS | L 7–45 | 4,000 | |
| November 1 | Florence State | Seibert Stadium; Homewood, AL | W 24–15 | 2,000 | |
| November 8 | Western Carolina^{†} | Seibert Stadium; Homewood, AL | L 13–47 | 5,500 | |
| November 15 | Appalachian State | Seibert Stadium; Homewood, AL | L 36–49 | 1,000 | |
^{†}Homecoming
