= 1961 Miami Hurricanes football team =

American college football season

1961 Miami Hurricanes football

Liberty Bowl, L 14–15 vs. Syracuse
- Conference: Independent

Ranking
- Coaches: No. 19
- Record: 7–4
- Head coach: Andy Gustafson (14th season)
- Home stadium: Miami Orange Bowl

1961 Southern college football independents records
| | Conf. | | | Overall |
| Team | W | L | T | W | | L | | T |
|---|---|---|---|---|---|---|---|---|
| Washington and Lee | | – | | 9 | – | 0 | – | 0 |
| Tampa | | – | | 8 | – | 1 | – | 0 |
| Mississippi College | | – | | 8 | – | 1 | – | 0 |
| Mississippi Southern | | – | | 8 | – | 2 | – | 0 |
| Memphis State | | – | | 8 | – | 2 | – | 0 |
| Delta State | | – | | 7 | – | 2 | – | 1 |
| Howard (AL) | | – | | 7 | – | 2 | – | 0 |
| South Carolina Trade | | – | | 6 | – | 2 | – | 0 |
| Maryville (TN) | | – | | 6 | – | 2 | – | 0 |
| Sewanee | | – | | 5 | – | 2 | – | 1 |
| Miles | | – | | 5 | – | 2 | – | 0 |
| Navy | | – | | 7 | – | 3 | – | 0 |
| Arlington State | | – | | 7 | – | 3 | – | 0 |
| Louisville | | – | | 6 | – | 3 | – | 0 |
| Miami (FL) | | – | | 7 | – | 4 | – | 0 |
| McMurry | | – | | 6 | – | 4 | – | 0 |
| Houston | | – | | 5 | – | 4 | – | 1 |
| Livingstone | | – | | 5 | – | 4 | – | 0 |
| Southwestern (TN) | | – | | 4 | – | 4 | – | 0 |
| Emory & Henry | | – | | 4 | – | 4 | – | 0 |
| Florida State | | – | | 4 | – | 5 | – | 1 |
| Norfolk State | | – | | 3 | – | 4 | – | 0 |
| Abilene Christian | | – | | 4 | – | 6 | – | 0 |
| Chattanooga | | – | | 4 | – | 6 | – | 0 |
| Georgetown (KY) | | – | | 2 | – | 3 | – | 1 |
| Arkansas State | | – | | 3 | – | 6 | – | 0 |
| Austin | | – | | 2 | – | 7 | – | 0 |
| Trinity (TX) | | – | | 2 | – | 7 | – | 0 |
| Millsaps | | – | | 1 | – | 5 | – | 2 |
| Centre | | – | | 1 | – | 7 | – | 0 |

The 1961 Miami Hurricanes football team was an American football team that represented the University of Miami as an independent during the 1961 college football season. In their 14th year under head coach Andy Gustafson, the Hurricanes compiled a 7–4 record, outscored opponents by a total of 146 to 85, and were ranked No. 19 in the final UPI poll. They defeated Penn State (25–8), Georgia (32–7), and Florida (15–6) in the regular season and lost to Syracuse (14–15) in the 1961 Liberty Bowl.

The team was led on offense by quarterback George Mira (896 passing yards), end Bill Miller (637 receiving yards), and fullback Jim Vollenweider (472 yards). Miller was a consensus first-team pick on the 1961 All-America college football team.

The team played its home games at the Orange Bowl in Miami, Florida.

== Schedule ==
| Date | Opponent | Site | Result | Attendance | Source |
|---|---|---|---|---|---|
| September 16 | Pittsburgh | Orange Bowl; Miami, FL | L 7–10 | 33,292 | |
| September 23 | at Kentucky | McLean Stadium; Lexington, KY | W 14–7 | 35,000 | |
| September 29 | No. 8 Penn State | Orange Bowl; Miami, FL | W 25–8 | 45,657 | |
| October 6 | Navy | Orange Bowl; Miami, FL | L 6–17 | 53,182 | |
| October 13 | Colorado | Orange Bowl; Miami, FL | L 7–9 | 40,393–40,397 | |
| October 27 | North Carolina | Orange Bowl; Miami, FL | W 10–0 | 29,612–29,671 | |
| November 3 | Georgia | Orange Bowl; Miami, FL | W 32–7 | 38,210 | |
| November 11 | at Tulane | Tulane Stadium; New Orleans, LA | W 6–0 | 15,000 | |
| November 24 | Northwestern | Orange Bowl; Miami, FL | W 10–6 | 46,282 | |
| December 2 | at Florida | Florida Field; Gainesville, FL (rivalry) | W 15–6 | 42,000 | |
| December 16 | vs. No. 14 Syracuse | Philadelphia Municipal Stadium; Philadelphia, PA (Liberty Bowl) | L 14–15 | 15,712 | |
Rankings from AP Poll released prior to the game

== Statistics ==
Miami players led the State of Florida in passing, total offense, rushing, and receiving:

- Quarterback George Mira led in passing, completing 74 of 151 passes for 896 yards. Mira also led the state in total offense with 1,075 yards.
- Miami's ends took first and second place in the state in receiving: Bill Miller with 43 receptions for 637 yards and Larry Wilson with 18 receptions for 257 yards.
- Fullback Jim Vollenweider led in rushing with 472 yards on 101 carries. Vollenweider's rushing yardage also qualified him for fifth place in the state in total offense. He also tied for fourth in the state with 18 points scored.

== Awards and honors ==
End Bill Miller was a consensus first-team pick on the 1961 All-America college football team, receiving first-team honors from the Associated Press (AP), United Press International (UPI), and the Football Writers Association of America (FWAA), among others.

Miller and quarterback George Mira were unanimous picks on the 1961 all-state football team selected in a poll of 12 Florida sports writers. Guard Bob Eggert and halfback Nick Ryder were also named to the first team. Five Miami players were named to the second team: end Larry Wilson; tackle Billy Watts; guard Jerry Reynolds; center Charley Livingston; and fullback Jim Vollenweider.

== Personnel ==
=== Players ===
- John Bahen (#30), halfback, 175 pounds
- John Bennett (#12), quarterback, 202 pounds
- James Bruno (#25), fullback, 188 pounds
- Dan Conners (#74), tackle, 225 pounds
- Bob Dentel (#56), center, 222 pounds
- Bill Diamond (#61), guard, 225 pounds
- Bob Eggert (#68), guard, 190 pounds
- Sam Fernandez (#46), fullback, 195 pounds
- Foster (#83), punter
- Ron Fritzsche (#23), halfback, 193 pounds
- Leo Lillimagi (#52), center, 212 pounds
- Charles Livingston (#75), center and kicker, 231 pounds
- Stan Maluty (#78), tackle, 218 pounds
- Bill Miller (#82), end, 192 pounds
- George Mira (#10), quarterback, sophomore, 176 pounds
- Jim O'Mahoney (#64), guard, 202 pounds
- Frank Reinhart (#89), end, 205 pounds
- Jerry Reynolds (#63), guard, 196 pounds
- Ben Rizzo (#81), end, 198 pounds
- Nick Ryder (#36), halfback, 190 pounds
- Joe Smerdel (#67), tackle, 215 pounds
- Nick Spinelli (#20), halfback, 176 pounds
- Jim Vollenweider (#33), fullback, 197 pounds
- Bill Watts (#77), tackle, 231 pounds
- Bobby Weaver, quarterback
- B. Wilson (#86), kicker
- Larry Wilson (#85), end, 198 pounds
