= Lee McLaughlin =

Lee McLaughlin may refer to:

- Lee McLaughlin (American football)
- Lee McLaughlin (actor)
