= 1961 Liberty Bowl =

American college football game

- 3rd Liberty Bowl
| Syracuse Orangemen | Miami Hurricanes |
| (7–3) | (7–3) |
| Independent | Independent |
| 15 | 14 |
| Head coach: Ben Schwartzwalder | Head coach: Andy Gustafson |
| AP / Coaches; 14 / 16 | AP / Coaches; NR / 19 |
| | 1 | 2 | 3 | 4 | Total |
|---|---|---|---|---|---|
| Syracuse | 0 | 0 | 8 | 7 | 15 |
| Miami | 6 | 8 | 0 | 0 | 14 |
- Date: December 16, 1961
- Season: 1961
- Stadium: Philadelphia Municipal Stadium
- Location: Philadelphia, Pennsylvania
- MVP: RB Dick Easterly
- Attendance: 15,712

The 1961 Liberty Bowl was a college football postseason bowl game played on December 16, 1961. The third edition of the Liberty Bowl, the game featured the Syracuse Orangemen and the Miami Hurricanes, both independent programs.

== Background ==
Syracuse running back Ernie Davis became the first African-American football player to win the Heisman Trophy. This was Syracuse's fifth bowl game in 8 years. Miami was making their first bowl appearance since 1952.

== Game summary ==
Jim Vollenweider scored on a 12-yard touchdown run to give Miami a 6–0 lead (though the extra point failed) in the first quarter. Nick Spineli scored on a 60-yard punt return to add onto the lead, and George Mira scored on the conversion pass to make it 14–0 at halftime. Syracuse culminated a 42-yard drive with an Ernie Davis touchdown plunge to make it 14–8 (with a Dave Sarette pass to Dick Easterly to get the two-point conversion). On the first play of the fourth quarter, Miami fumbled the ball, and Bill Schoonover recovered at the Orange 49. Nine plays and 51 yards later, Sarette threw a touchdown pass to Easterly to make it 14–14, with the extra point proving to be important. Ken Erickson's extra point was good, as the Orange won, 15–14. Ernie Davis rushed for 140 yards on 30 carries. Easterly caught four passes for 50 yards.

== Aftermath ==
Davis died of leukemia before he ever played a snap in the National Football League. Miami returned to the Liberty Bowl in 1966, while Syracuse returned in 1996.

== Statistics ==
| Statistics | Syracuse | Miami |
|---|---|---|
| First downs | 21 | 11 |
| Rushing yards | 221 | 109 |
| Passing yards | 148 | 94 |
| Total yards | 369 | 203 |
| Punts–average | 7–31.4 | 9–30.3 |
| Punt return yards | 14 | 78 |
| Kickoff return yards | 60 | 32 |
| Fumbles–lost | 3–2 | 3–1 |
| Penalties–yards | 5–35 | 3–29 |
