= List of Samford Bulldogs head football coaches =

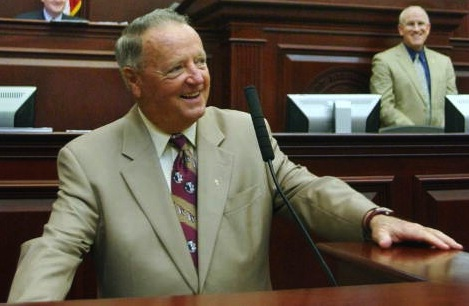
Bobby Bowden served as the 26th head coach of the Sanford Bulldogs from 1959 to 1962.

The Samford Bulldogs college football team represents Samford University (Note: Samford University previously competed as Howard College from 1841 to 1965.) as a member of the Southern Conference (SoCon). The Bulldogs competes as part of the NCAA Division I Football Championship Subdivision. The program has had 37 head coaches, and one interim head coach since it began play during the 1902 season. Since December 2025, John Grass has served as head coach at Samford.

Five coaches have led Samford to the postseason: Bobby Bowden, Wayne Grubb, Terry Bowden, Pat Sullivan, and Hatcher. Four of those coaches also won conference championships: Eddie McLane captured one and Billy Bancroft two, as a member of the Dixie Conference; Sullivan and Hatcher each captured one as a member of Southern Conference.

Hatcher is the leader in seasons coached, with 10 years as head coach and games coached (100) and won (57). Bobby Bowden has the highest winning percentage at 0.838. Maxwell James and Bub Walker have the lowest winning percentage of those who have coached more than one game, with 0.000. Of the 36 different head coaches who have led the Bulldogs, Bobby Bowden and Sullivan have been inducted into the College Football Hall of Fame.

== Key ==
Key to symbols in coaches list
General		Overall		Conference		Postseason (Note: Although the first Rose Bowl Game was played in 1902, it has been continuously played since the 1916 game, and is recognized as the oldest bowl game by the NCAA. "—" indicates any season prior to 1916 when postseason games were not played.)	
No.	Order of coaches (Note: A running total of the number of head coaches, with coaches who served separate tenures being counted only once. Interim head coaches are represented with "Int" and are not counted in the running total. "—" indicates the team played but either without a coach or no coach is on record. "X" indicates an interim year without play.)	GC	Games coached	CW	Conference wins	PW	Postseason wins
DC	Division championships	OW	Overall wins	CL	Conference losses	PL	Postseason losses
CC	Conference championships	OL	Overall losses	CT	Conference ties	PT	Postseason ties
NC	National championships	OT	Overall ties (Note: Overtime rules in college football were introduced in 1996, making ties impossible in the period since.)	C%	Conference winning percentage		
†	Elected to the College Football Hall of Fame	O%	Overall winning percentage (Note: When computing the win–loss percentage, a tie counts as half a win and half a loss.)				

== Coaches ==
List of head football coaches showing season(s) coached, overall records, conference records, postseason records, championships and selected awards (Note: Statistics correct as of the end of the 2024 NCAA Division I FCS football season.)
No.	Name	Season(s) (Note: Samford did not field teams in 1904, 1942, 1946–1947, and from 1974–1983.)	GC	OW	OL	OT	O%	CW	CL	CT	C%	PW	PL	PT	CC	NC	Awards
1	Houston Gwin	1902–1903	7	4	3	0	0.571	—	—	—	—	—	—	—	—	0	—
2	Walter T. O'Hara	1903	2	1	1	0	0.500	—	—	—	—	—	—	—	—	0	—
3	Davis F. Stakely	1905	4	1	2	1	0.375	—	—	—	—	—	—	—	—	0	—
4	John Counselman (Note: Counselman resigned after the first two games of the 1908 season. Winton M. Blount served as head coach for the final four games. Howard finished the season with an overall record of 2–4.)	1906–1908	20	9	10	1	0.475	—	—	—	—	—	—	—	—	0	—
5	William A. Blount	1908	4	2	2	0	0.500	—	—	—	—	—	—	—	—	0	—
6	John B. Longwell	1909; 1911; 1916–1917	31	14	14	3	0.500	3	11	2	0.250	—	—	—	0	0	—
7	James C. Donnelly	1910	9	1	8	0	0.111	0	5	0	.000	—	—	—	0	0	—
8	B. L. Noojin	1912–1914	25	10	13	2	0.440	0	4	0	.000	—	—	—	0	0	—
9	Eugene Caton	1915	8	3	4	1	0.438	0	3	0	.000	—	—	—	0	0	—
10	C. W. Streit (Note: John B. Longwell coached only the first five games of the 1917 season. Streit coached the final two games of the season.)	1917	2	1	1	0	0.500	0	0	0	–	—	—	—	0	0	—
11	Maxwell James	1918	2	0	2	0	.000	0	1	0	.000	—	—	—	0	0	—
12	Chester C. Dillon	1919; 1927–1928	32	16	11	5	0.578	5	8	2	0.400	—	—	—	0	0	—
13	Robert C. Marshall	1920–1921	18	6	11	1	0.361	3	7	0	0.300	—	—	—	0	0	—
14	Harris G. Cope	1922–1923	20	5	10	5	0.375	1	5	1	0.214	—	—	—	0	0	—
15	Jenks Gillem	1924–1926	27	13	12	2	0.519	7	8	1	0.469	—	—	—	0	0	—
16	Eddie McLane	1929–1933	53	28	19	6	0.585	16	11	4	0.581	—	—	—	1	0	—
17	Clyde Propst	1934	9	3	4	2	0.444	2	2	1	0.500	—	—	—	0	0	—
18	Billy Bancroft	1935–1939	44	22	18	4	0.545	15	6	3	0.688	—	—	—	2	0	—
19	William C. White	1940–1941; 1954	28	10	17	1	0.375	6	1	1	0.813	—	—	—	0	0	—
20	Euil Snider	1943	4	2	2	0	0.500	—	—	—	—	—	—	—	—	0	—
21	Bub Walker	1944–1945	10	0	10	0	.000	—	—	—	—	—	—	—	—	0	—
22	Ted McCrary	1948	8	4	4	0	0.500	—	—	—	—	—	—	—	—	0	—
23	Earl Gartman	1949–1953	43	14	28	1	0.337	—	—	—	—	—	—	—	—	0	—
24	Howard Foote	1955–1956	18	3	13	2	0.222	—	—	—	—	—	—	—	—	0	—
25	Virgil Ledbetter	1957–1958	17	6	10	1	0.382	—	—	—	—	—	—	—	—	0	—
26	Bobby Bowden^{†}	1959–1962	37	31	6	0	0.838	—	—	—	—	1	1	0	—	0	—
27	Bubba Scott	1963–1965	28	13	13	2	0.500	—	—	—	—	0	0	0	—	0	—
28	John Lee Armstrong	1966–1968	31	20	9	2	0.677	—	—	—	—	0	0	0	—	0	—
29	Wayne Grubb	1969–1973	48	25	20	3	0.552	—	—	—	—	1	0	0	—	0	—
30	Kim Alsop	1984–1986	27	6	21	0	0.222	—	—	—	—	0	0	0	—	0	—
31	Terry Bowden	1987–1992	69	45	23	1	0.659	—	—	—	—	1	2	0	—	0	—
32	Chan Gailey	1993	11	5	6	0	0.455	—	—	—	—	0	0	0	—	0	—
33	Pete Hurt	1994–2001	82	42	39	1	0.518	—	—	—	—	0	0	0	—	0	—
34	Bill Gray	2001–2006	60	27	33	—	0.450	31	32	—	0.492	0	0	0	0	0	OVC Coach of the Year (2003)
35	Pat Sullivan^{†}	2007–2014	90	47	43	—	0.522	31	32	—	0.492	0	1	0	1	0	SoCon Co-Coach of the Year (2012)
36	Chris Hatcher	2015–2025	121	62	59	—	0.512	47	40	—	0.540	1	3	0	1	0	—
Int	Scot Sloan (Note: Scot Sloan was named interim head coach for the final two games of the 2025 season, following the termination of Chris Hatcher as head coach.)	2025	2	0	2	—	.000	0	2	—	.000	0	0	—	0	0	—
37	John Grass	2026–present	0	0	0	—	–	0	0	—	–	0	0	0	0	0	—
