= 1961 Florida State Seminoles football team =

American college football season

1961 Florida State Seminoles football
- Conference: Independent
- Record: 4–5–1
- Head coach: Bill Peterson (2nd season)
- Captain: Steve Klesius
- Home stadium: Doak Campbell Stadium

1961 Southern college football independents records
	Conf.			Overall
Team	W	L	T	W		L		T
Washington and Lee		–		9	–	0	–	0
Tampa		–		8	–	1	–	0
Mississippi College		–		8	–	1	–	0
Mississippi Southern		–		8	–	2	–	0
Memphis State		–		8	–	2	–	0
Delta State		–		7	–	2	–	1
Howard (AL)		–		7	–	2	–	0
South Carolina Trade		–		6	–	2	–	0
Maryville (TN)		–		6	–	2	–	0
Sewanee		–		5	–	2	–	1
Miles		–		5	–	2	–	0
Navy		–		7	–	3	–	0
Arlington State		–		7	–	3	–	0
Louisville		–		6	–	3	–	0
Miami (FL)		–		7	–	4	–	0
McMurry		–		6	–	4	–	0
Houston		–		5	–	4	–	1
Livingstone		–		5	–	4	–	0
Southwestern (TN)		–		4	–	4	–	0
Emory & Henry		–		4	–	4	–	0
Florida State		–		4	–	5	–	1
Norfolk State		–		3	–	4	–	0
Abilene Christian		–		4	–	6	–	0
Chattanooga		–		4	–	6	–	0
Georgetown (KY)		–		2	–	3	–	1
Arkansas State		–		3	–	6	–	0
Austin		–		2	–	7	–	0
Trinity (TX)		–		2	–	7	–	0
Millsaps		–		1	–	5	–	2
Centre		–		1	–	7	–	0

The 1961 Florida State Seminoles football team represented Florida State University as an independent during the 1961 college football season. This was Bill Peterson's second year as head coach, and he led the team to a 4–5–1 record.

== Schedule ==
Date	Opponent	Site	Result	Attendance	Source
September 16	George Washington	Doak Campbell Stadium; Tallahassee FL	W 15–7	19,200	
September 30	at No. 17 Florida	Florida Field; Gainesville, FL (rivalry)	T 3–3	46,000	
October 7	at No. 2 Ole Miss	Hemingway Stadium; Oxford, MS	L 0–33	12,000	
October 14	Georgia	Doak Campbell Stadium; Tallahassee, FL	W 3–0	21,200	
October 21	Richmond	Doak Campbell Stadium; Tallahassee, FL	W 13–7	13,600	
October 28	at Virginia Tech	Miles Stadium; Blacksburg, VA	L 7–10	14,000	
November 4	at Kentucky	McLean Stadium; Lexington, KY	L 0–20	20,000	
November 11	The Citadel	Doak Campbell Stadium; Tallahassee, FL	W 44–8	14,600	
November 18	Mississippi Southern	Doak Campbell Stadium; Tallahassee, FL	L 0–12	18,700	
November 25	at Houston	Rice Stadium; Houston, TX	L 8–28	7,000	
Rankings from AP Poll released prior to the game
