= 1961 Washington and Lee Generals football team =

American college football season

1961 Washington and Lee Generals football
- Conference: Independent
- Record: 9–0
- Head coach: Lee McLaughlin (5th season)
- Captains: Barton Dick; Ned Hobbs
- Home stadium: Wilson Field

1961 Southern college football independents records
	Conf.			Overall
Team	W	L	T	W		L		T
Washington and Lee		–		9	–	0	–	0
Tampa		–		8	–	1	–	0
Mississippi College		–		8	–	1	–	0
Mississippi Southern		–		8	–	2	–	0
Memphis State		–		8	–	2	–	0
Delta State		–		7	–	2	–	1
Howard (AL)		–		7	–	2	–	0
South Carolina Trade		–		6	–	2	–	0
Maryville (TN)		–		6	–	2	–	0
Sewanee		–		5	–	2	–	1
Miles		–		5	–	2	–	0
Navy		–		7	–	3	–	0
Arlington State		–		7	–	3	–	0
Louisville		–		6	–	3	–	0
Miami (FL)		–		7	–	4	–	0
McMurry		–		6	–	4	–	0
Houston		–		5	–	4	–	1
Livingstone		–		5	–	4	–	0
Southwestern (TN)		–		4	–	4	–	0
Emory & Henry		–		4	–	4	–	0
Florida State		–		4	–	5	–	1
Norfolk State		–		3	–	4	–	0
Abilene Christian		–		4	–	6	–	0
Chattanooga		–		4	–	6	–	0
Georgetown (KY)		–		2	–	3	–	1
Arkansas State		–		3	–	6	–	0
Austin		–		2	–	7	–	0
Trinity (TX)		–		2	–	7	–	0
Millsaps		–		1	–	5	–	2
Centre		–		1	–	7	–	0

The 1961 Washington and Lee Generals football team was an American football team that represented the Washington and Lee University as an independent during the 1961 college football season. In their fifth year under head coach Lee McLaughlin, the Generals compiled a perfect 9–0 record, held seven opponents to fewer than seven points, and outscored all opponents by a total of 297 to 44. It was their first perfect season since the 1914 team went 9–0. At the end of the season, the team received the Timmie Trophy as the outstanding small college football team in the country. The team was inducted in 2008 into the Washington and Lee Hall of Fame.

In November 1961, Sports Illustrated published a profile on the team, noting: "At Washington and Lee football is strictly amateur. No athletic scholarships are given, nor have any been given for the past seven years, a decision which at the time it was taken brought screams of protest from ardent alumni. But this year's team, made up purely of students who play football rather than football players who study, is proving that winning football on an unsubsidized basis can be as much fun to play and as exciting to watch as any football anywhere."

The team was led on defense by linebacker Terry Fohs. Fohs received second-team honors on the 1961 Little All-America college football team.

On offense, Charlie Gummey and Doug Martin led the team in scoring with 54 points each.

The team played its home games at Wilson Field in Lexington, Virginia.

== Schedule ==
Date	Opponent	Site	Result	Attendance	Source
September 23	Hampden–Sydney	Wilson Field; Lexington, VA	W 7–6	3,000	
October 7	at Franklin & Marshall	Lancaster, PA	W 40–0	3,000	
October 14	Randolph–Macon^{†}	Wilson Field; Lexington, VA	W 43–0	3,000–3,500	
October 21	at Johns Hopkins	Homewood Field; Baltimore, MD	W 38–6	137	
October 28	Emory and Henry	Lexington, VA	W 27–6	4,500–6,000	
November 4	at Centre	Farris Stadium; Danville, KY	W 53–0	2,000	
November 11	at Sewanee	Hardee Field; Sewanee, TN	W 26–6	2,500	
November 18	Frederick	Wilson Field; Lexington, VA	W 30–0	2,500	
November 23	at Washington University	Francis Field; St. Louis, MO	W 33–20	2,500	
^{†}Homecoming
