= 1961 Sewanee Tigers football team =

American college football season

1961 Sewanee Tigers football
- Conference: Independent
- Record: 5–2–1
- Head coach: Shirley Majors (5th season)
- Home stadium: Hardee Field

1961 Southern college football independents records
	Conf.			Overall
Team	W	L	T	W		L		T
Washington and Lee		–		9	–	0	–	0
Tampa		–		8	–	1	–	0
Mississippi College		–		8	–	1	–	0
Mississippi Southern		–		8	–	2	–	0
Memphis State		–		8	–	2	–	0
Delta State		–		7	–	2	–	1
Howard (AL)		–		7	–	2	–	0
South Carolina Trade		–		6	–	2	–	0
Maryville (TN)		–		6	–	2	–	0
Sewanee		–		5	–	2	–	1
Miles		–		5	–	2	–	0
Navy		–		7	–	3	–	0
Arlington State		–		7	–	3	–	0
Louisville		–		6	–	3	–	0
Miami (FL)		–		7	–	4	–	0
McMurry		–		6	–	4	–	0
Houston		–		5	–	4	–	1
Livingstone		–		5	–	4	–	0
Southwestern (TN)		–		4	–	4	–	0
Emory & Henry		–		4	–	4	–	0
Florida State		–		4	–	5	–	1
Norfolk State		–		3	–	4	–	0
Abilene Christian		–		4	–	6	–	0
Chattanooga		–		4	–	6	–	0
Georgetown (KY)		–		2	–	3	–	1
Arkansas State		–		3	–	6	–	0
Austin		–		2	–	7	–	0
Trinity (TX)		–		2	–	7	–	0
Millsaps		–		1	–	5	–	2
Centre		–		1	–	7	–	0

The 1961 Sewanee Tigers football team was an American football team that represented Sewanee: The University of the South as an independent during the 1961 college football season. In their fifth season under head coach Shirley Majors, the Tigers compiled a 5–2–1 record.

Key players included fullback Sam Gill; tailback M.L. Agnew; and end Bob Davis.

The team played its home games at Hardee Field in Sewanee, Tennessee.

== Schedule ==
Date	Opponent	Site	Result	Attendance	Source
October 1	at Millsaps	Jackson, MS	T 0–0	4,000	
October 7	Hampden–Sydney	Hardee Field; Sewanee, TN	W 21–9	1,500	
October 14	at Austin	Louis Calder Stadium; Sherman, TX	W 21–12	1,100	
October 21	Randolph–Macon^{†}	Hardee Field; Sewanee, TN	W 21–0	1,800	
October 28	at Centre	Danville, KY	W 41–0	2,000	
November 4	at Southwestern (TN)	Memphis, TN	W 27–12	1,500	
November 11	Washington and Lee	Hardee Field; Sewanee, TN	L 8–26	2,500	
November 18	Mississippi College	Hardee Field; Sewanee, TN	L 6–42		
^{†}Homecoming
