= 1961 Memphis State Tigers football team =

American college football season

1961 Memphis State Tigers football
- Conference: Independent
- Record: 8–2
- Head coach: Billy J. Murphy (4th season)
- Captains: Don Coffey; Jack Carter
- Home stadium: Crump Stadium

1961 Southern college football independents records
	Conf.			Overall
Team	W	L	T	W		L		T
Washington and Lee		–		9	–	0	–	0
Tampa		–		8	–	1	–	0
Mississippi College		–		8	–	1	–	0
Mississippi Southern		–		8	–	2	–	0
Memphis State		–		8	–	2	–	0
Delta State		–		7	–	2	–	1
Howard (AL)		–		7	–	2	–	0
South Carolina Trade		–		6	–	2	–	0
Maryville (TN)		–		6	–	2	–	0
Sewanee		–		5	–	2	–	1
Miles		–		5	–	2	–	0
Navy		–		7	–	3	–	0
Arlington State		–		7	–	3	–	0
Louisville		–		6	–	3	–	0
Miami (FL)		–		7	–	4	–	0
McMurry		–		6	–	4	–	0
Houston		–		5	–	4	–	1
Livingstone		–		5	–	4	–	0
Southwestern (TN)		–		4	–	4	–	0
Emory & Henry		–		4	–	4	–	0
Florida State		–		4	–	5	–	1
Norfolk State		–		3	–	4	–	0
Abilene Christian		–		4	–	6	–	0
Chattanooga		–		4	–	6	–	0
Georgetown (KY)		–		2	–	3	–	1
Arkansas State		–		3	–	6	–	0
Austin		–		2	–	7	–	0
Trinity (TX)		–		2	–	7	–	0
Millsaps		–		1	–	5	–	2
Centre		–		1	–	7	–	0

The 1961 Memphis State Tigers football team was an American football team that represented Memphis State College (now known as the University of Memphis) as an independent during the 1961 college football season. In its fourth season under head coach Billy J. Murphy, the Tigers compiled an 8–2 record and outscored opponents by a total of 332 to 75.

The team's statistical leaders included James Earl Wright with 604 passing yards, fullback Dave Casinelli with 646 rushing yards and 54 points scored, and Don Coffey with 312 receiving yards. Coffey and Jack Carter were the team captains.

The team played its home games at Crump Stadium in Memphis, Tennessee.

== Schedule ==
Date	Opponent	Site	Result	Attendance	Source
September 16	The Citadel	Crump Stadium; Memphis, TN	W 40–0	17,345	
September 23	at Tulsa	Skelly Stadium; Tulsa, OK	W 48–12	14,252	
September 30	Hardin–Simmons	Crump Stadium; Memphis, TN	W 56–0	10,000–10,285	
October 7	at Louisville	Cardinal Stadium; Louisville, KY (rivalry)	W 28–13	11,332	
October 14	Mississippi Southern	Crump Stadium; Memphis, TN (Black and Blue Bowl)	W 21–7	22,119	
October 21	Abilene Christian^{†}	Crump Stadium; Memphis, TN	W 35–0		
October 28	Mississippi State	Crump Stadium; Memphis, TN	L 16–23	30,092	
November 4	Furman	Crump Stadium; Memphis, TN	L 6–7	6,036	
November 11	North Texas State	Crump Stadium; Memphis, TN	W 41–0	6,921	
November 23	at Chattanooga	Chamberlain Field; Chattanooga, TN	W 41–13		
^{†}Homecoming
