= 1961 Houston Cougars football team =

American college football season

1961 Houston Cougars football
- Conference: Independent
- Record: 5–4–1
- Head coach: Hal Lahar (5th season)
- Captains: Ken Bolin; Bill Brown; Joe Bob Isbell
- Home stadium: Rice Stadium

1961 Southern college football independents records
	Conf.			Overall
Team	W	L	T	W		L		T
Washington and Lee		–		9	–	0	–	0
Tampa		–		8	–	1	–	0
Mississippi College		–		8	–	1	–	0
Mississippi Southern		–		8	–	2	–	0
Memphis State		–		8	–	2	–	0
Delta State		–		7	–	2	–	1
Howard (AL)		–		7	–	2	–	0
South Carolina Trade		–		6	–	2	–	0
Maryville (TN)		–		6	–	2	–	0
Sewanee		–		5	–	2	–	1
Miles		–		5	–	2	–	0
Navy		–		7	–	3	–	0
Arlington State		–		7	–	3	–	0
Louisville		–		6	–	3	–	0
Miami (FL)		–		7	–	4	–	0
McMurry		–		6	–	4	–	0
Houston		–		5	–	4	–	1
Livingstone		–		5	–	4	–	0
Southwestern (TN)		–		4	–	4	–	0
Emory & Henry		–		4	–	4	–	0
Florida State		–		4	–	5	–	1
Norfolk State		–		3	–	4	–	0
Abilene Christian		–		4	–	6	–	0
Chattanooga		–		4	–	6	–	0
Georgetown (KY)		–		2	–	3	–	1
Arkansas State		–		3	–	6	–	0
Austin		–		2	–	7	–	0
Trinity (TX)		–		2	–	7	–	0
Millsaps		–		1	–	5	–	2
Centre		–		1	–	7	–	0

The 1961 Houston Cougars football team was an American football team that represented the University of Houston as an independent during the 1961 college football season. In their fifth and final season under head coach Hal Lahar, the Cougars compiled a 5–4–1 record.

Ken Bolin, Bill Brown, and Joe Bob Isbell were the team captains.

The team played its home games at Rice Stadium in Houston.

== Schedule ==
Date	Opponent	Site	Result	Attendance	Source
September 23	at Texas A&M	Kyle Field; College Station, TX	T 7–7	22,000	
September 30	Mississippi State	Rice Stadium; Houston, TX	L 7–10	27,000	
October 7	Boston College	Rice Stadium; Houston, TX	W 21–0	12,000	
October 14	vs. No. 1 Ole Miss	Crump Stadium; Memphis, TN	L 7–47	15,610	
October 21	at Cincinnati	Nippert Stadium; Cincinnati, OH	W 13–7	11,000	
October 28	No. 4 Alabama^{†}	Rice Stadium; Houston, TX	L 0–17	24,000	
November 11	at Tulsa	Skelly Stadium; Tulsa, OK	W 14–2	10,278	
November 18	at Oklahoma State	Lewis Field; Stillwater, OK	L 24–28	10,000	
November 25	Florida State	Rice Stadium; Houston, TX	W 28–8	7,000	
December 2	Oregon State	Rice Stadium; Houston, TX	W 23–12	12,000	
^{†}Homecoming; Rankings from AP Poll released prior to the game

== Statistics ==
The Cougars gained an average of 127.3 rushing yards and 96.9 passing yards per game during the 1961 season. On defense, they held opponents to 107.3 rushing yards and 106.6 passing yards per game.

The team's passing leaders were quarterbacks Don Sessions (48 of 111 for 549 yards, four touchdowns, 10 interceptions) and Billy Roland (41 of 79 for 420 yards, four touchdowns, five interceptions).

The team's rushing leaders were Ken Bolin (355 yards, 50 carries, 5.9 yard average), Billy Roland (288 yards, 108 carries, 2.7 yard average), Bobby Brezina (236 yards, 60 carries, 3.9 yard average), and Larry Broussard (213 yards, 65 carries, 3.3 yard average).

The team's receiving leaders were Bill McMillan (15 receptions, 244 yards) and Clem Beard (10 receptions, 124 yards).

Billy Roland and Larry Broussard tied as the team's leading scorers with 24 points each. Ken Bolin and Milt Perkins followed with 18 points each.
