= 1961 Delta State Statesmen football team =

American college football season

1961 Delta State Statesmen football
- Conference: Independent
- Record: 7–2–1
- Head coach: Horace McCool (1st season)
- Home stadium: Delta Field

1961 Southern college football independents records
| | Conf. | | | Overall |
| Team | W | L | T | W | | L | | T |
|---|---|---|---|---|---|---|---|---|
| Washington and Lee | | – | | 9 | – | 0 | – | 0 |
| Tampa | | – | | 8 | – | 1 | – | 0 |
| Mississippi College | | – | | 8 | – | 1 | – | 0 |
| Mississippi Southern | | – | | 8 | – | 2 | – | 0 |
| Memphis State | | – | | 8 | – | 2 | – | 0 |
| Delta State | | – | | 7 | – | 2 | – | 1 |
| Howard (AL) | | – | | 7 | – | 2 | – | 0 |
| South Carolina Trade | | – | | 6 | – | 2 | – | 0 |
| Maryville (TN) | | – | | 6 | – | 2 | – | 0 |
| Sewanee | | – | | 5 | – | 2 | – | 1 |
| Miles | | – | | 5 | – | 2 | – | 0 |
| Navy | | – | | 7 | – | 3 | – | 0 |
| Arlington State | | – | | 7 | – | 3 | – | 0 |
| Louisville | | – | | 6 | – | 3 | – | 0 |
| Miami (FL) | | – | | 7 | – | 4 | – | 0 |
| McMurry | | – | | 6 | – | 4 | – | 0 |
| Houston | | – | | 5 | – | 4 | – | 1 |
| Livingstone | | – | | 5 | – | 4 | – | 0 |
| Southwestern (TN) | | – | | 4 | – | 4 | – | 0 |
| Emory & Henry | | – | | 4 | – | 4 | – | 0 |
| Florida State | | – | | 4 | – | 5 | – | 1 |
| Norfolk State | | – | | 3 | – | 4 | – | 0 |
| Abilene Christian | | – | | 4 | – | 6 | – | 0 |
| Chattanooga | | – | | 4 | – | 6 | – | 0 |
| Georgetown (KY) | | – | | 2 | – | 3 | – | 1 |
| Arkansas State | | – | | 3 | – | 6 | – | 0 |
| Austin | | – | | 2 | – | 7 | – | 0 |
| Trinity (TX) | | – | | 2 | – | 7 | – | 0 |
| Millsaps | | – | | 1 | – | 5 | – | 2 |
| Centre | | – | | 1 | – | 7 | – | 0 |

The 1961 Delta State Statesmen football team was an American football team that represented Delta State Teachers College (now known as the Delta State University) as an independent during the 1961 college football season. In their first year under head coach Horace McCool, the Statesmen compiled a 7–2–1 record and outscored opponents 210 to 83.

The team's assistant coaches were Gene (Chad) Chadwik, John Watts, and student assistant Benny Price.

The team played its home games at Delta Field in Cleveland, Mississippi.

== Schedule ==
| Date | Opponent | Site | Result | Attendance | Source |
|---|---|---|---|---|---|
| September 16 | at Florence State | Florence, AL | L 6–9 | 6,000 | |
| September 21 | Arkansas A&M | Delta Field; Cleveland, MS | W 34–0 | 3,500 | |
| September 30 | at Jacksonville State | Paul Snow Stadium; Jacksonville, AL | W 32–15 | 5,000 | |
| October 7 | Southeast Missouri State | Delta Field; Cleveland, MS | W 13–6 | 4,000 | |
| October 14 | Troy State | Delta Field; Cleveland, MS | W 48–0 | 3,000–4,000 | |
| October 21 | at Howard (AL) | Seibert Stadium; Homewood, AL | L 14–20 | 5,500 | |
| October 28 | Tennessee–Martin^{†} | Delta Field; Cleveland, MS | W 22–8 | 4,000 | |
| November 4 | at Northeast Louisiana State | Brown Stadium; Monroe, LAA | W 9–0 | 5,600–5,700 | |
| November 18 | Louisiana College | Delta Field; Cleveland, MS | T 6–6 | 1,500 | |
| November 23 | at Ouachita Baptist | Williams Field; Arkadelphia, AR | W 26–19 | 757 | |
^{†}Homecoming

== Statistics ==
The team tallied 3,446 yards of total offense (344.6 yards per game), consisting of 2,755 rushing yards (275.5 yards per game) and 691 passing yards (69.1 yards per game). On defense, the team held opponents to 1,282 yards of total offense (128.2 yards per game) with 911 rushing yards (91.1 yards per game) and 610 passing yards (61.0 yards per game).

Despite missing a game due to injury, left halfback Les Henning of Brookhaven, Mississippi, led the team in rushing (502 yards on 84 carries), receiving (141 yards on eight catches), total offense (502 yards), and punting (29 punts for an average of 36.0 yards per punt). Right halfback Billy Bowman led the team in scoring with 50 points on eight touchdowns and a two-point conversion.

Quarterback Sonny Hill completed 14th of 20 passes for 222 yards with four touchdowns and one interception. Hill broke his foot in the Southeast Missouri game and was replaced for the last half of the season by Chester Norris.
