= 1961 Maryville Scots football team =

American college football season

1961 Maryville Scots football
- Conference: Independent
- Record: 6–2
- Head coach: Boydson Baird (3rd season)
- Home stadium: Honaker Field

1961 Southern college football independents records
	Conf.			Overall
Team	W	L	T	W		L		T
Washington and Lee		–		9	–	0	–	0
Tampa		–		8	–	1	–	0
Mississippi College		–		8	–	1	–	0
Mississippi Southern		–		8	–	2	–	0
Memphis State		–		8	–	2	–	0
Delta State		–		7	–	2	–	1
Howard (AL)		–		7	–	2	–	0
South Carolina Trade		–		6	–	2	–	0
Maryville (TN)		–		6	–	2	–	0
Sewanee		–		5	–	2	–	1
Miles		–		5	–	2	–	0
Navy		–		7	–	3	–	0
Arlington State		–		7	–	3	–	0
Louisville		–		6	–	3	–	0
Miami (FL)		–		7	–	4	–	0
McMurry		–		6	–	4	–	0
Houston		–		5	–	4	–	1
Livingstone		–		5	–	4	–	0
Southwestern (TN)		–		4	–	4	–	0
Emory & Henry		–		4	–	4	–	0
Florida State		–		4	–	5	–	1
Norfolk State		–		3	–	4	–	0
Abilene Christian		–		4	–	6	–	0
Chattanooga		–		4	–	6	–	0
Georgetown (KY)		–		2	–	3	–	1
Arkansas State		–		3	–	6	–	0
Austin		–		2	–	7	–	0
Trinity (TX)		–		2	–	7	–	0
Millsaps		–		1	–	5	–	2
Centre		–		1	–	7	–	0

The 1961 Maryville Scots football team was an American football team that represented Maryville College of Maryville, Tennessee, as an independent during the 1961 college football season. In their third year under head coach Boydson Baird, the Scots compiled a 6–2 record and outscored opponents by a total of 148 to 72.

The team tallied 1,878 yards of total offense (232 yards per game), consisting of 1,322 rushing yards (165 yards per game) and 546 passing yards (68 yards per game). On defense, the Scots gave up 1,842 yards to their opponents with 1,217 rushing yards (152 yards per game) and 625 passing yards (77 yards per game).

The team's individual statistical leaders included halfback Tom Bowers with 227 rushing yards; quarterback Eddy Bruce with 399 passing yards; end Bill Owenby with 169 receiving yards; and halfback Ron Lingenfelter with 40 points scored on six touchdowns and two two-point conversion catches.

The team played its home games at Honaker Field in Maryville, Tennessee.

== Schedule ==
Date	Opponent	Site	Result	Source
September 30	Centre	Honaker Field; Maryville, TN	W 34–0	
October 7	Georgetown (KY)	Honaker Field; Maryville, TN	W 27–14	
October 14	at Emory and Henry	Emory, VA	L 0–12	
October 21	at Bridgewater	Bridgewater, VA	W 31–0	
October 28	Southwestern (TN)	Honaker Field; Maryville, TN	W 22–10	
November 4	at Millsaps	Jackson, MS	W 6–0	
November 11	Frederick	Portsmouth, VA	W 8–7	
November 18	Carson–Newman	Honaker Field; Maryville, TN	L 20–29	
