= 1961 Arlington State Rebels football team =

American college football season

1961 Arlington State Rebels football
- Conference: Independent
- Record: 7–3
- Head coach: Chena Gilstrap (9th season)
- Home stadium: Memorial Stadium

1961 Southern college football independents records
	Conf.			Overall
Team	W	L	T	W		L		T
Washington and Lee		–		9	–	0	–	0
Tampa		–		8	–	1	–	0
Mississippi College		–		8	–	1	–	0
Mississippi Southern		–		8	–	2	–	0
Memphis State		–		8	–	2	–	0
Delta State		–		7	–	2	–	1
Howard (AL)		–		7	–	2	–	0
South Carolina Trade		–		6	–	2	–	0
Maryville (TN)		–		6	–	2	–	0
Sewanee		–		5	–	2	–	1
Miles		–		5	–	2	–	0
Navy		–		7	–	3	–	0
Arlington State		–		7	–	3	–	0
Louisville		–		6	–	3	–	0
Miami (FL)		–		7	–	4	–	0
McMurry		–		6	–	4	–	0
Houston		–		5	–	4	–	1
Livingstone		–		5	–	4	–	0
Southwestern (TN)		–		4	–	4	–	0
Emory & Henry		–		4	–	4	–	0
Florida State		–		4	–	5	–	1
Norfolk State		–		3	–	4	–	0
Abilene Christian		–		4	–	6	–	0
Chattanooga		–		4	–	6	–	0
Georgetown (KY)		–		2	–	3	–	1
Arkansas State		–		3	–	6	–	0
Austin		–		2	–	7	–	0
Trinity (TX)		–		2	–	7	–	0
Millsaps		–		1	–	5	–	2
Centre		–		1	–	7	–	0

The 1961 Arlington State Rebels football team was an American football team that represented Arlington State College (now known as the University of Texas at Arlington) as an independent during the 1961 college football season. In their ninth year under head coach Chena Gilstrap, the team compiled a 7–3 record.

== Schedule ==
Date	Opponent	Site	Result	Attendance	Source
September 16	at Mississippi Southern	Faulkner Field; Hattiesburg, MS	L 7–30	6,000–8,500	
September 23	Southwestern Louisiana	Memorial Stadium; Arlington, TX	W 26–0	5,000–8,000	
September 30	Stephen F. Austin	Memorial Stadium; Arlington, TX	W 26–0	4,800–5,500	
October 7	at McNeese State	Wildcat Stadium; Lake Charles, LA	W 22–19	5,500	
October 14	Louisiana Tech	Memorial Stadium; Arlington, TX	W 8–7	5,000–7,000	
October 21	at McMurry	Shotwell Stadium; Abilene, TX	L 22–23	3,000–6,000	
October 28	at Trinity (TX)	Alamo Stadium; San Antonio, TX	W 19–14	2,300–3,000	
November 4	Abilene Christian	Memorial Stadium; Arlington, TX	L 15–17	5,600	
November 11	at Northeast Louisiana State	Brown Stadium; Monroe, LA	W 35–6	2,500	
November 18	Southwestern Oklahoma State	Memorial Stadium; Arlington, TX	W 27–0	5,000	
