= 1961 Navy Midshipmen football team =

American college football season

1961 Navy Midshipmen football
- Conference: Independent
- Record: 7–3
- Head coach: Wayne Hardin (3rd season)
- Captain: John Hewitt
- Home stadium: Navy–Marine Corps Memorial Stadium

1961 Southern college football independents records
	Conf.			Overall
Team	W	L	T	W		L		T
Washington and Lee		–		9	–	0	–	0
Tampa		–		8	–	1	–	0
Mississippi College		–		8	–	1	–	0
Mississippi Southern		–		8	–	2	–	0
Memphis State		–		8	–	2	–	0
Delta State		–		7	–	2	–	1
Howard (AL)		–		7	–	2	–	0
South Carolina Trade		–		6	–	2	–	0
Maryville (TN)		–		6	–	2	–	0
Sewanee		–		5	–	2	–	1
Miles		–		5	–	2	–	0
Navy		–		7	–	3	–	0
Arlington State		–		7	–	3	–	0
Louisville		–		6	–	3	–	0
Miami (FL)		–		7	–	4	–	0
McMurry		–		6	–	4	–	0
Houston		–		5	–	4	–	1
Livingstone		–		5	–	4	–	0
Southwestern (TN)		–		4	–	4	–	0
Emory & Henry		–		4	–	4	–	0
Florida State		–		4	–	5	–	1
Norfolk State		–		3	–	4	–	0
Abilene Christian		–		4	–	6	–	0
Chattanooga		–		4	–	6	–	0
Georgetown (KY)		–		2	–	3	–	1
Arkansas State		–		3	–	6	–	0
Austin		–		2	–	7	–	0
Trinity (TX)		–		2	–	7	–	0
Millsaps		–		1	–	5	–	2
Centre		–		1	–	7	–	0

The 1961 Navy Midshipmen football team represented the United States Naval Academy (USNA) as an independent during the 1961 college football season. The team was led by third-year head coach Wayne Hardin.

== Schedule ==
Date	Opponent	Site	Result	Attendance	Source
September 23	at Penn State	Beaver Stadium; University Park, PA	L 10–20	39,340	
September 30	William & Mary^{†}	Navy–Marine Corps Memorial Stadium; Annapolis, MD	W 44–6	17,803	
October 6	at Miami (FL)	Miami Orange Bowl; Miami, FL	W 17–6	53,182	
October 14	at Cornell	Schoellkopf Field; Ithaca, NY	W 31–7	22,000	
October 20	at Detroit	University of Detroit Stadium; Detroit, MI	W 37–19	31,279	
October 28	at Pittsburgh	Pitt Stadium; Pittsburgh, PA	L 14–28	36,875	
November 4	at Notre Dame	Notre Dame Stadium; Notre Dame, IN (rivalry)	W 13–10	59,075	
November 11	vs. Duke	Foreman Field; Norfolk, VA (Oyster Bowl)	L 9–30	32,000–32,127	
November 18	Virginia	Navy–Marine Corps Memorial Stadium; Annapolis, MD	W 13–3	23,565	
December 2	vs. Army	Philadelphia Municipal Stadium; Philadelphia, PA (Army–Navy Game)	W 13–7	101,000	
^{†}Homecoming
