= 1961 Arkansas State Indians football team =

American college football season

1961 Arkansas State Indians football
- Conference: Independent
- Record: 3–6
- Head coach: King Block (2nd season)
- Home stadium: Kays Stadium

1961 Southern college football independents records
	Conf.			Overall
Team	W	L	T	W		L		T
Washington and Lee		–		9	–	0	–	0
Tampa		–		8	–	1	–	0
Mississippi College		–		8	–	1	–	0
Mississippi Southern		–		8	–	2	–	0
Memphis State		–		8	–	2	–	0
Delta State		–		7	–	2	–	1
Howard (AL)		–		7	–	2	–	0
South Carolina Trade		–		6	–	2	–	0
Maryville (TN)		–		6	–	2	–	0
Sewanee		–		5	–	2	–	1
Miles		–		5	–	2	–	0
Navy		–		7	–	3	–	0
Arlington State		–		7	–	3	–	0
Louisville		–		6	–	3	–	0
Miami (FL)		–		7	–	4	–	0
McMurry		–		6	–	4	–	0
Houston		–		5	–	4	–	1
Livingstone		–		5	–	4	–	0
Southwestern (TN)		–		4	–	4	–	0
Emory & Henry		–		4	–	4	–	0
Florida State		–		4	–	5	–	1
Norfolk State		–		3	–	4	–	0
Abilene Christian		–		4	–	6	–	0
Chattanooga		–		4	–	6	–	0
Georgetown (KY)		–		2	–	3	–	1
Arkansas State		–		3	–	6	–	0
Austin		–		2	–	7	–	0
Trinity (TX)		–		2	–	7	–	0
Millsaps		–		1	–	5	–	2
Centre		–		1	–	7	–	0

The 1961 Arkansas State Indians football team represented Arkansas State College—now known as Arkansas State University—as an independent during the 1961 college football season. Led by second-year head coach King Block, the Indians compiled a record of 3–6.

== Schedule ==
Date	Opponent	Site	Result	Attendance	Source
September 16	at South Dakota	Inman Field; Vermillion, SD	W 21–9	1,500–3,000	
September 23	at Louisiana Tech	Tech Stadium; Ruston, LA	L 8–47	6,500–7,500	
September 30	Florence State	Kays Stadium; Jonesboro, AR	W 14–6		
October 7	Montana State	Kays Stadium; Jonesboro, AR	L 6–9		
October 14	at Mississippi State	Scott Field; Starkville, MS	L 0–38	20,000	
October 21	at Mississippi Southern	Faulkner Field; Hattiesburg, MS	L 0–20	6,100	
October 28	Murray State	Kays Stadium; Jonesboro, AR	W 22–14		
November 11	Whitewater State	Kays Stadium; Jonesboro, AR	L 7–8		
November 18	at The Citadel	Johnson Hagood Stadium; Charleston, SC	L 6–28	13,100	
