= 1961 Mississippi Southern Southerners football team =

American college football season

1961 Mississippi Southern Southerners football
- Conference: Independent
- Record: 8–2
- Head coach: Thad Vann (13th season)
- Home stadium: Faulkner Field

1961 Southern college football independents records
	Conf.			Overall
Team	W	L	T	W		L		T
Washington and Lee		–		9	–	0	–	0
Tampa		–		8	–	1	–	0
Mississippi College		–		8	–	1	–	0
Mississippi Southern		–		8	–	2	–	0
Memphis State		–		8	–	2	–	0
Delta State		–		7	–	2	–	1
Howard (AL)		–		7	–	2	–	0
South Carolina Trade		–		6	–	2	–	0
Maryville (TN)		–		6	–	2	–	0
Sewanee		–		5	–	2	–	1
Miles		–		5	–	2	–	0
Navy		–		7	–	3	–	0
Arlington State		–		7	–	3	–	0
Louisville		–		6	–	3	–	0
Miami (FL)		–		7	–	4	–	0
McMurry		–		6	–	4	–	0
Houston		–		5	–	4	–	1
Livingstone		–		5	–	4	–	0
Southwestern (TN)		–		4	–	4	–	0
Emory & Henry		–		4	–	4	–	0
Florida State		–		4	–	5	–	1
Norfolk State		–		3	–	4	–	0
Abilene Christian		–		4	–	6	–	0
Chattanooga		–		4	–	6	–	0
Georgetown (KY)		–		2	–	3	–	1
Arkansas State		–		3	–	6	–	0
Austin		–		2	–	7	–	0
Trinity (TX)		–		2	–	7	–	0
Millsaps		–		1	–	5	–	2
Centre		–		1	–	7	–	0

The 1961 Mississippi Southern Southerners football team was an American football team that represented Mississippi Southern College (now known as the University of Southern Mississippi) as an independent during the 1961 college football season. In their thirteenth year under head coach Thad Vann, the team compiled a 8–2 record.

== Schedule ==
Date	Opponent	Rank	Site	Result	Attendance	Source
September 16	Arlington State		Faulkner Field; Hattiesburg, MS	W 30–7	6,000–8,500	
September 30	at Southwestern Louisiana		McNaspy Stadium; Lafayette, LA	W 22–6	3,500	
October 7	Chattanooga	No. 6	Faulkner Field; Hattiesburg, MS	W 24–7	13,000	
October 14	at Memphis State		Crump Stadium; Memphis, TN (rivalry)	L 7–21	22,119	
October 21	Arkansas State		Faulkner Field; Hattiesburg, MS	W 20–0	6,100	
October 28	Abilene Christian^{†}	No. 10	Faulkner Field; Hattiesburg, MS	W 33–6	11,000	
November 4	NC State	No. 8	Ladd Stadium; Mobile, AL	L 6–7	13,000	
November 11	at Louisiana Tech		Tech Stadium; Ruston, LA (rivalry)	W 7–0	2,500	
November 18	at Florida State		Doak Campbell Stadium; Tallahassee, FL	W 12–0	18,700	
November 25	Trinity (TX)	No. T–10	Faulkner Field; Hattiesburg, MS	W 22–14	5,000	
^{†}Homecoming; Rankings from AP Poll released prior to the game
