= 1961 Mississippi College Choctaws football team =

American college football season

1961 Mississippi College Choctaws football
- Conference: Independent
- Record: 8–1
- Head coach: Hartwell McPhail (3rd season)
- MVP: Alton Greenlee
- Captains: Alton Greenlee; G. T. Thames
- Home stadium: Robinson Field

1961 Southern college football independents records
	Conf.			Overall
Team	W	L	T	W		L		T
Washington and Lee		–		9	–	0	–	0
Tampa		–		8	–	1	–	0
Mississippi College		–		8	–	1	–	0
Mississippi Southern		–		8	–	2	–	0
Memphis State		–		8	–	2	–	0
Delta State		–		7	–	2	–	1
Howard (AL)		–		7	–	2	–	0
South Carolina Trade		–		6	–	2	–	0
Maryville (TN)		–		6	–	2	–	0
Sewanee		–		5	–	2	–	1
Miles		–		5	–	2	–	0
Navy		–		7	–	3	–	0
Arlington State		–		7	–	3	–	0
Louisville		–		6	–	3	–	0
Miami (FL)		–		7	–	4	–	0
McMurry		–		6	–	4	–	0
Houston		–		5	–	4	–	1
Livingstone		–		5	–	4	–	0
Southwestern (TN)		–		4	–	4	–	0
Emory & Henry		–		4	–	4	–	0
Florida State		–		4	–	5	–	1
Norfolk State		–		3	–	4	–	0
Abilene Christian		–		4	–	6	–	0
Chattanooga		–		4	–	6	–	0
Georgetown (KY)		–		2	–	3	–	1
Arkansas State		–		3	–	6	–	0
Austin		–		2	–	7	–	0
Trinity (TX)		–		2	–	7	–	0
Millsaps		–		1	–	5	–	2
Centre		–		1	–	7	–	0

The 1961 Mississippi College Choctaws football team was an American football team that represented Mississippi College as an independent during the 1961 college football season. In their third year under head coach Hartwell McPhail, the Choctaws compiled an 8–1 record, shut out their first four opponents, and outscored all opponents by a total of 209 to 60 points. The Choctaws' 8–1 record marked the program's best season since 1927 Choctaws compiled a perfect 8–0 record. The team set a school record with an average of 264.0 rushing yards per game, while holding opponents to an average of only 99.9 rushing yards per game.

Quarterback Alton Greenlee, weighing only 150 pounds, was selected as the team's most valuable player. He led the team in total offense (371 rushing yards, 272 passing yards) and 68 points scored (10 touchdowns and four two-point conversion). Fullback G. T. Thames led the team in rushing with 483 yards on 98 carries (4.9 yard average). Reserve quarterback Charles Garrett set a new school record with an average of 20.0 yards on 11 punt returns.

The team played its home games at Robinson Field in Clinton, Mississippi.

== Schedule ==
Date	Opponent	Site	Result	Source
September 16	at Arkansas A&M	Monticello, AR	W 27–0	
September 23	at Southern State (AR)	Magnolia, AR	W 20–0	
September 30	Austin	Robinson Field; Clinton, MS	W 29–0	
October 7	at Henderson State	Arkadelphia, AR	W 13–0	
October 14	Southwestern (TN)^{†}	Robinson Field; Clinton, MS	W 22–6	
October 21	at Jacksonville State	Paul Snow Stadium; Jacksonville, AL	L 6–21	
November 4	Howard (AL)	Robinson Field; Clinton, MS	W 15–14	
November 11	Carson–Newman	Robinson Field; Clinton, MS	W 25–14	
November 18	at Sewanee	McGee Field; Sewanee, TN	W 42–6	
^{†}Homecoming

== Personnel ==
=== Players ===
Players receiving varsity letters in 1961 were:

- Fred Akers, fullback
- Bill Bobo, guard
- Bob Bobo, tackle, winner of most-improved player award
- George Bond, guard
- John Bowlin, tackle
- Vonnie Mac Breland, tackle
- Jerry Bustin, guard
- Charles Faulkner, end
- Jerry Foshee, guard, winner of best blocker award
- Charles Garrett, quarterback
- Alton Greenlee, quarterback and co-captain
- Dewey Herring, end
- Benson Holland, halfback
- Tommy Hudson, guard
- Jimmy Jinkins, tackle
- Billy Kelson, halfback
- Eddie Killough, guard
- Mart McMullan, center, winner of sportsmanship award
- Benny McKibbens, end
- Ray McPhail, halfback
- James Merritt, fullback
- Norman Minton, halfback
- Billy Newman, end
- Paul Pounds, end
- Jimbo Robertson, center
- Jack Root, quarterback
- Charles Simmons, tackle
- Clem Stovall, fullback
- G. T. Thames, fullback and co-captain
- Charles Underwood, halfback
- Mike Vinson, end
- Pat Watts, halfback
- Bud Yeats, center

=== Coaches ===
- Head coach - Hartwell McPhail
- Assistant coaches

- Bernard Blackwell (line)
- Ken Bramlett (ends)
- James Parkman (backfield)
