= 1961 Miles Golden Bears football team =

American college football season

1961 Miles Golden Bears football
- Conference: Independent
- Record: 5–2
- Head coach: T. J. Knox (25th season)
- Home stadium: Alumni Stadium

1961 Southern college football independents records
	Conf.			Overall
Team	W	L	T	W		L		T
Washington and Lee		–		9	–	0	–	0
Tampa		–		8	–	1	–	0
Mississippi College		–		8	–	1	–	0
Mississippi Southern		–		8	–	2	–	0
Memphis State		–		8	–	2	–	0
Delta State		–		7	–	2	–	1
Howard (AL)		–		7	–	2	–	0
South Carolina Trade		–		6	–	2	–	0
Maryville (TN)		–		6	–	2	–	0
Sewanee		–		5	–	2	–	1
Miles		–		5	–	2	–	0
Navy		–		7	–	3	–	0
Arlington State		–		7	–	3	–	0
Louisville		–		6	–	3	–	0
Miami (FL)		–		7	–	4	–	0
McMurry		–		6	–	4	–	0
Houston		–		5	–	4	–	1
Livingstone		–		5	–	4	–	0
Southwestern (TN)		–		4	–	4	–	0
Emory & Henry		–		4	–	4	–	0
Florida State		–		4	–	5	–	1
Norfolk State		–		3	–	4	–	0
Abilene Christian		–		4	–	6	–	0
Chattanooga		–		4	–	6	–	0
Georgetown (KY)		–		2	–	3	–	1
Arkansas State		–		3	–	6	–	0
Austin		–		2	–	7	–	0
Trinity (TX)		–		2	–	7	–	0
Millsaps		–		1	–	5	–	2
Centre		–		1	–	7	–	0

The 1961 Miles Golden Bears football team was an American football team that represented Miles College of Fairfield, Alabama, as an independent during the 1961 college football season. In their 25th year under head coach T. J. Knox, the Golden Bears compiled a 5–2 record.

The team's players included quarterback Charles Jackson, halfbacks Clarence Byrd and Jesse "Shakey" Williams, ends Eugene Underwood and Edward McCall, and guard Harold Battle. The team's assistant coaches were James Pettus and Oscar Catlin Jr.

== Schedule ==
Date	Opponent	Site	Result	Attendance	Source
September 23	Albany State	Alumni Stadium; Fairfield, AL	W 26–12	> 3,000	
October 7	Rust	Alumni Stadium; Fairfield, AL	W 27–0		
October 14	Claflin^{†}	Alumni Stadium; Fairfield, AL	W 27–8		
October 28	at Benedict	Columbia, SC	L 6–37		
November 4	at Tuskegee	Tuskegee, AL	W 26–12		
November 11	Fort Valley State	Alumni Stadium; Fairfield, AL	W 14–13		
November 18	at Alabama A&M	Normal, AL	L 14–26		
^{†}Homecoming
