= 1961 Chattanooga Moccasins football team =

American college football season

1961 Chattanooga Moccasins football
- Conference: Independent
- Record: 4–6
- Head coach: Scrappy Moore (31st season)
- Captain: Carey Henley
- Home stadium: Chamberlain Field

1961 Southern college football independents records
| | Conf. | | | Overall |
| Team | W | L | T | W | | L | | T |
|---|---|---|---|---|---|---|---|---|
| Washington and Lee | | – | | 9 | – | 0 | – | 0 |
| Tampa | | – | | 8 | – | 1 | – | 0 |
| Mississippi College | | – | | 8 | – | 1 | – | 0 |
| Mississippi Southern | | – | | 8 | – | 2 | – | 0 |
| Memphis State | | – | | 8 | – | 2 | – | 0 |
| Delta State | | – | | 7 | – | 2 | – | 1 |
| Howard (AL) | | – | | 7 | – | 2 | – | 0 |
| South Carolina Trade | | – | | 6 | – | 2 | – | 0 |
| Maryville (TN) | | – | | 6 | – | 2 | – | 0 |
| Sewanee | | – | | 5 | – | 2 | – | 1 |
| Miles | | – | | 5 | – | 2 | – | 0 |
| Navy | | – | | 7 | – | 3 | – | 0 |
| Arlington State | | – | | 7 | – | 3 | – | 0 |
| Louisville | | – | | 6 | – | 3 | – | 0 |
| Miami (FL) | | – | | 7 | – | 4 | – | 0 |
| McMurry | | – | | 6 | – | 4 | – | 0 |
| Houston | | – | | 5 | – | 4 | – | 1 |
| Livingstone | | – | | 5 | – | 4 | – | 0 |
| Southwestern (TN) | | – | | 4 | – | 4 | – | 0 |
| Emory & Henry | | – | | 4 | – | 4 | – | 0 |
| Florida State | | – | | 4 | – | 5 | – | 1 |
| Norfolk State | | – | | 3 | – | 4 | – | 0 |
| Abilene Christian | | – | | 4 | – | 6 | – | 0 |
| Chattanooga | | – | | 4 | – | 6 | – | 0 |
| Georgetown (KY) | | – | | 2 | – | 3 | – | 1 |
| Arkansas State | | – | | 3 | – | 6 | – | 0 |
| Austin | | – | | 2 | – | 7 | – | 0 |
| Trinity (TX) | | – | | 2 | – | 7 | – | 0 |
| Millsaps | | – | | 1 | – | 5 | – | 2 |
| Centre | | – | | 1 | – | 7 | – | 0 |

The 1961 Chattanooga Moccasins football team was an American football team that represented the University of Chattanooga (now known as the University of Tennessee at Chattanooga) during the 1961 college football season. In their 31st year under head coach Scrappy Moore, the team compiled a 4–6 record.

== Schedule ==
| Date | Opponent | Site | Result | Attendance | Source |
|---|---|---|---|---|---|
| September 16 | Jacksonville State | Chamberlain Field; Chattanooga, TN | W 13–7 | 8,520 | |
| September 23 | Tennessee Tech | Chamberlain Field; Chattanooga, TN | W 19–9 | 8,000 | |
| September 29 | East Tennessee State | Chamberlain Field; Chattanooga, TN | W 27–6 | 7,300 | |
| October 7 | at No. 6 Mississippi Southern | Faulkner Field; Hattiesburg, MS | L 7–24 | 13,000 | |
| October 14 | at Auburn | Cliff Hare Stadium; Auburn, AL | L 7–35 | 22,000 | |
| October 21 | at Middle Tennessee | Horace Jones Field; Murfreesboro, TN | W 25–12 | 7,000 | |
| October 28 | at Tennessee | Shields–Watkins Field; Knoxville, TN | L 7–20 | 25,000 | |
| November 4 | Presbyterian^{†} | Chamberlain Field; Chattanooga, TN | L 9–10 | | |
| November 11 | at No. 7 (major) Ole Miss | Hemingway Stadium; Oxford, MS | L 0–54 | 10,000 | |
| November 23 | Memphis State | Chamberlain Field; Chattanooga, TN | L 13–41 | | |
^{†}Homecoming; Rankings from AP Poll released prior to the game
