= 1961 Louisville Cardinals football team =

American college football season

1961 Louisville Cardinals football
- Conference: Independent
- Record: 6–3
- Head coach: Frank Camp (16th season)
- Home stadium: Fairgrounds Stadium

1961 Southern college football independents records
	Conf.			Overall
Team	W	L	T	W		L		T
Washington and Lee		–		9	–	0	–	0
Tampa		–		8	–	1	–	0
Mississippi College		–		8	–	1	–	0
Mississippi Southern		–		8	–	2	–	0
Memphis State		–		8	–	2	–	0
Delta State		–		7	–	2	–	1
Howard (AL)		–		7	–	2	–	0
South Carolina Trade		–		6	–	2	–	0
Maryville (TN)		–		6	–	2	–	0
Sewanee		–		5	–	2	–	1
Miles		–		5	–	2	–	0
Navy		–		7	–	3	–	0
Arlington State		–		7	–	3	–	0
Louisville		–		6	–	3	–	0
Miami (FL)		–		7	–	4	–	0
McMurry		–		6	–	4	–	0
Houston		–		5	–	4	–	1
Livingstone		–		5	–	4	–	0
Southwestern (TN)		–		4	–	4	–	0
Emory & Henry		–		4	–	4	–	0
Florida State		–		4	–	5	–	1
Norfolk State		–		3	–	4	–	0
Abilene Christian		–		4	–	6	–	0
Chattanooga		–		4	–	6	–	0
Georgetown (KY)		–		2	–	3	–	1
Arkansas State		–		3	–	6	–	0
Austin		–		2	–	7	–	0
Trinity (TX)		–		2	–	7	–	0
Millsaps		–		1	–	5	–	2
Centre		–		1	–	7	–	0

The 1961 Louisville Cardinals football team was an American football team that represented the University of Louisville as an independent during the 1961 college football season. In their 16th season under head coach Frank Camp, the Cardinals compiled a 6–3 record and outscored opponents by a total of 180 to 92. Quarterback Johnny Giles set a new school record with 1,346 yards of total offense during the 1961 season.

The team played its home games at Fairgrounds Stadium in Louisville, Kentucky.

== Schedule ==
Date	Opponent	Site	Result	Attendance	Source
September 16	Tennessee Tech	Fairgrounds Stadium; Louisville, KY	W 29–13	6,148	
September 22	at Eastern Kentucky	Richmond, KY	W 33–6	4,000	
September 30	Marshall	Fairgrounds Stadium; Louisville, KY	W 32–6	3,126–3,162	
October 7	Memphis State	Fairgrounds Stadium; Louisville, KY (rivalry)	L 13–28	11,332	
October 14	Dayton	Fairgrounds Stadium; Louisville, KY	L 6–7	4,236	
October 21	Western Kentucky	Fairgrounds Stadium; Louisville, KY	W 20–0	4,825	
November 4	at Xavier	Xavier Stadium; Cincinnati, OH	L 8–16	4,532	
November 11	at Kent State	Memorial Stadium; Kent, OH	W 19–15	4,000	
November 18	at North Texas State	Fouts Field; Denton, TX	W 20–0	4,000	

== Statistics ==
The Cardinals tallied 2,987 yards of total offense (332 yards per game), consisting of 1,770 rushing yards (196 yards per game) and 1,217 passing yards (135 yards per game). On defense, they held opponents to 1,835 yards of total offense (204 yards per game) with 1,109 rushing yards and 726 passing yards.

Junior quarterback Johnny Giles set a new Louisville single-season record with 1,346 yards of total offense, including 1,209 passing yards. His total offense mark ranked eight among the nation's small college players during the 1961 season. Giles also tied Johnny Unitas' Louisville single-game record with four touchdown passes in a victory over Marshall.

Junior end Don Hockensmith and junior halfback Lee Calland tied as the team's leading scorers with 36 points each. They were followed by Ernie Green with 32 points and Tanny Phelps with 30.

The team's rushing leaders were Lee Calland with (600 yards, 108 carries) and Ernie Green (397 yards, 87 carries).

The team's receiving leaders were Don Hockensmith (20 receptions, 392 yards) and Lee Calland (16 receptions, 223 yards).
