= 1961 McMurry Indians football team =

American college football season

1961 McMurry Indians football
- Conference: Independent
- Record: 6–4
- Head coach: Grant Teaff (2nd season)
- Home stadium: Shotwell Stadium

1961 Southern college football independents records
	Conf.			Overall
Team	W	L	T	W		L		T
Washington and Lee		–		9	–	0	–	0
Tampa		–		8	–	1	–	0
Mississippi College		–		8	–	1	–	0
Mississippi Southern		–		8	–	2	–	0
Memphis State		–		8	–	2	–	0
Delta State		–		7	–	2	–	1
Howard (AL)		–		7	–	2	–	0
South Carolina Trade		–		6	–	2	–	0
Maryville (TN)		–		6	–	2	–	0
Sewanee		–		5	–	2	–	1
Miles		–		5	–	2	–	0
Navy		–		7	–	3	–	0
Arlington State		–		7	–	3	–	0
Louisville		–		6	–	3	–	0
Miami (FL)		–		7	–	4	–	0
McMurry		–		6	–	4	–	0
Houston		–		5	–	4	–	1
Livingstone		–		5	–	4	–	0
Southwestern (TN)		–		4	–	4	–	0
Emory & Henry		–		4	–	4	–	0
Florida State		–		4	–	5	–	1
Norfolk State		–		3	–	4	–	0
Abilene Christian		–		4	–	6	–	0
Chattanooga		–		4	–	6	–	0
Georgetown (KY)		–		2	–	3	–	1
Arkansas State		–		3	–	6	–	0
Austin		–		2	–	7	–	0
Trinity (TX)		–		2	–	7	–	0
Millsaps		–		1	–	5	–	2
Centre		–		1	–	7	–	0

The 1961 McMurry Indians football team was an American football team that represented McMurry College (now known as McMurry University) as an independent during the 1961 college football season. In their second year under head coach Grant Teaff, the Indians compiled a 6–4 record.

== Schedule ==
Date	Opponent	Site	Result	Attendance	Source
September 9	vs. Texas Lutheran	Breckenridge, TX	W 6–0	3,000	
September 16	Howard Payne	Shotwell Stadium; Abilene, TX	W 28–8	3,000	
September 23	at Trinity (TX)	San Antonio, TX	L 0–19		
September 30	at New Mexico State	Memorial Stadium; Las Cruces, NM	L 7–35		
October 7	at Southwest Texas State	Evans Field; San Marcos, TX	L 13–28	4,500	
October 14	at Texas Western	Kidd Field; El Paso, TX	L 16–20		
October 21	Arlington State	Shotwell Stadium; Abilene, TX	W 24–22	3,000–6,000	
November 4	at Tarleton State	Stephenville, TX	W 42–8		
November 11	Hardin–Simmons	Shotwell Stadium; Abilene, TX (rivalry)	W 27–14	3,000	
November 25	Abilene Christian	Shotwell Stadium; Abilene, TX	W 33–28	10,000	
