= In the Light of the Moon =

- Film poster with the alternate title of Ed Gein
- Directed by: Chuck Parello
- Written by: Stephen Johnston
- Produced by: Hamish McAlpine; Michael Muscal
- Starring: Steve Railsback; Carrie Snodgress
- Cinematography: Vanja Cernjul
- Edited by: Elena Maganini
- Music by: Robert McNaughton
- Production company: Tartan Films
- Distributed by: Tartan Films
- Release dates: October 2000 (Sitges Film Festival); May 4, 2001 (United States)
- Running time: 89 minutes
- Countries: United States; United Kingdom
- Language: English

In the Light of the Moon (also known as Ed Gein) is a 2000 crime horror film directed by Chuck Parello, and written by Stephen Johnston. It is based on the crimes of Ed Gein, an American murderer who killed at least two women in Plainfield, Wisconsin, during the 1950s. It stars Steve Railsback as Gein, and Carrie Snodgress as Gein's domineering, fundamentalist mother, Augusta.

== Plot ==
Growing up on a farm in rural Wisconsin, Ed Gein is abused by both his Christian fundamentalist mother, Augusta, and his alcoholic father, George. George dies of a heart attack in 1940, and four years later, Ed kills his older brother, Henry, in a fit of rage after Henry insults Augusta. Ed makes it look like Henry died in a brush fire, and lives alone with Augusta until she dies of a stroke in 1945. Ed becomes depressed after his mother's death, and lets the family farm become squalid and dilapidated, with the exception of Augusta's room, which is sealed off by Ed.

Living off of agricultural subsidies and the money that he makes from leasing land and babysitting children, the increasingly unstable Ed makes nightly excursions to the Plainfield Cemetery and digs up recently deceased elderly women. He makes futile attempts at reviving them, before decorating his home with pieces of their corpses, at one point passing "shrunken heads" off as gifts from a cousin in the Philippines.

Ed begins suffering from hallucinations of Augusta, who commands him to kill "sinful" women, starting with a tavern owner named Mary Hogan. Ed shoots Mary and takes her to his farm, where he leaves her bound to a bed until she dies. Ed butchers her body, consuming some of it, and using the rest to add to his crudely designed "woman suit." Ed's delusions worsen, and he becomes convinced that Mary's death has resurrected Augusta, who implores Ed to kill a hardware store owner named Collette Marshall. Ed shoots Collette and brings her body back to his farm before having dinner with the Andersons, a neighboring family who he surprises with "Venison steaks."

Colette's employee, Brian, returns from a hunting trip to find the unmanned store full of blood, and calls the police. Brian suspects Ed of being involved in Mary and Collette's disappearances, and races to Ed's farm, followed by Sheriff Jim Stillwell. After finding Collette's decapitated and "dressed out" body hanging in Ed's barn, an enraged Brian tracks Ed down to the Anderson residence, but is talked out of shooting Ed by Sheriff Stillwell, who arrests Ed.

The film ends with a nonlinear montage that consists of the police uncovering evidence in Ed's home, interviews with Ed after he was diagnosed with schizophrenia and placed in a psychiatric hospital, and scenes in which Ed tries to keep his urges in check through prayer and rituals. He also exhumes corpses, only to rebury them after snapping out of a fugue state. An intertitle states that Ed died of respiratory failure in 1984, and was buried next to his mother.

== Cast ==
- Steve Railsback as Ed Gein
- Carrie Snodgress as Augusta W. Gein
- Carol Mansell as Collette Marshall
- Sally Champlin as Mary Hogan
- Steve Blackwood as Brian
- Nancy Linehan Charles as Eleanor M. Adams
- Bill Cross as George Gein
- Jan Hoag as Judy Anderson
- Brian Evers as Henry Gein
- Pat Skipper as Sheriff Jim Stillwell
- Craig Zimmerman as Pete Anderson
- Lee McLaughlin as Phil Anderson
- Ryan Thomas Brockington as Ed Gein at 16
- Austin James Peck as Ed Gein at 10
- Luke Rowland as Henry Gein at 14
- Devin Alexander as Doris Wickstrom
- Rick Simpson as Henry Gein at 20
- Danny Keogh as Hunter

== Release ==
Ed Gein premiered in America, in a single theater in Los Angeles, on May 4, 2001. On its opening weekend, the film grossed $5,708, and by May 11 had grossed $11,821.

=== Home media ===
Ed Gein was released on VHS by Millennium on July 24, 2001. That same year, the film was released on DVD by both First Look Home Entertainment on June 24 and Tartan Video on November 29. On April 22, 2003, it was re-released by First Look as part of a three-disk box set which included Dahmer and Ted Bundy. That same day, it was released as a single-feature by Velocity Home Entertainment. It was last released in 2005 by both Prism and First Look on February 14 and August 26, respectively.

== Reception ==
On Rotten Tomatoes, the film holds an approval rating of 10% based on 10 reviews, with a weighted average rating of 4.1/10.

Ain't It Cool News praised Steve Railsback's performance as Gein, and concluded, "Ed Gein is not must-see but it's a lot better than I thought it would be. I would recommend a rental to the curious horror or true crime fans out there looking for something sort of along the lines of Henry: Portrait of a Serial Killer, but tamer, but at the same time a lot sicker." Time Out found the film to be "a surprisingly sober response to a potentially salacious subject" and wrote, "As with the best scenes of Deranged, the conjunction of colourful case history, odd impulses, gallows humour, low budget austerity and genuinely grotesque iconography produces a felicitous and engaging variant of American Gothic."

In a review written for AllMovie, Richard Gilliam commended the film's historical accuracy, production design, and "low-key" approach to its source material, but also found it to be lacking in style, writing, "The problem with the authenticity here is that the filmmakers have managed to authentically capture the dull, boring parts of life in 1950s rural Wisconsin. Ed Gein is so under-the-top that what should be compelling merely becomes unpleasant." Nathan Rabin of The A.V. Club had a lukewarm response to the film, writing, "Half character study, half exploitation film, Ed Gein is most effective when it focuses on Gein's halting attempts to connect with his neighbors, who treat him with the polite but decided distance of an adult dealing with a misbehaving but well-intentioned child. Where the film falters is in its attempts to explain away Gein's madness with a massive dose of pop psychology."

While The Guardian's Philip French offered praise to Railsback's performance as Gein, he found the film itself to be "a generally unsensational chunk of bizarre Americana" that "adds little to our understanding of the man." Fellow Guardian reviewer Peter Bradshaw had a similar response to the film, writing, "Really, it's the same old pulpy, paranoid voyeuristic stuff, and Ed's fear and hatred of women is never that edifying. It's well acted, and effectively put together, but there is an insurmountable problem: gloomy, grave-robbing, body-chopping old Ed is, in the end, just a little bit of a bore." Kevin Thomas of the Los Angeles Times afforded the film moderate praise, commending the performances, the atmosphere, and the historical accuracy, but went on to write, "Ed Gein resists cheap humor in favor of moments that are inherently darkly comic, and tries for a seriousness of purpose, yet is at times awkward and under-inspired, creating a question as to whether so gloomy and repugnant a tale was worth telling simply for its own sake."

Neil Smith of the BBC called the film "gross and repellent" and awarded it a score of 2/5, writing, "Parello's stated intention is to explore the psychology of his twisted protagonist, but the result has all the hallmarks of a low-budget exploitationer, right down to its B movie leads Steve Railsback and Carrie Snodgress. Would it be too much to expect some thought or consideration for Gein's victims? Evidently so, given Hollywood's depressing habit of turning serial killers into cult heroes." Variety's Robert Koehler gave Ed Gein a wholly negative review, deriding it for being both lackluster and "a disappointingly mild re-creation of true events."

Chuck Parello and Steve Railsback won Best Film and Best Actor, respectively, at the 2000 Sitges Film Festival.

== See also ==
- The Hillside Strangler, another true crime film directed by Chuck Parello and written by Stephen Johnston
