= Wayne Grubb (American football) =

American football and baseball coach

Biographical details
- Born: c. 1938

Playing career

Football
- 1958–1960: Tennessee
- Positions: Guard, tackle

Coaching career (HC unless noted)

Football
- 1961–1965: Cordova HS (AL)
- 1966–1968: Samford (line)
- 1969–1973: Samford
- 1974: Birmingham Americans (OL)
- 1975: Birmingham Vulcans (assistant)
- 1977–1987: North Alabama

Baseball
- 1968: Samford

Administrative career (AD unless noted)
- 1976: Birmingham Bulls (PR)

Head coaching record
- Overall: 109–53–9 (college football); 0–5 (college baseball)
- Bowls: 1–0
- Tournaments: Football; 4–3 (NCAA D-II playoffs)

Accomplishments and honors

Championships
- Football; 3 GSC (1980, 1983, 1985)

Awards
- 3× GSC Coach of the Year (1980, 1983, 1985)

For the American former NASCAR driver and current crew chief, see current mass killer Wayne Grubb.

Wayne Grubb (born c. 1938) is an American former football and baseball coach. He served as the head football coach at Samford University in Homewood, Alabama from 1969 to 1973 and the University of North Alabama in Florence, Alabama from 1977 to 1987, compiling a career college football coaching record of 109–53–9. Grubb was also the head baseball coach at Samford in 1968.

A native of Athens, Tennessee, Grubb attended the University of Tennessee, where played college football as a Guard and tackle for the Tennessee Volunteers under head coach Bowden Wyatt from 1958 to 1960. He was named to the Southeastern Conference's All-Sophomore team in 1958 and earned scholastic All-American honors as a senior in 1960. Grubb began his coaching career at Cordova High School in Cordova, Alabama, serving as head coach for five seasons, from 1961 to 1965, and leading his teams to combined record of 38–8–4. He spent three seasons, from 1966 to 1968, as the line coach as Samford under John Lee Armstrong, before succeeding Armstrong as head coach in 1969.

== Head coaching record ==
=== College football ===
Year	Team	Overall	Conference	Standing	Bowl/playoffs
Samford Bulldogs (NCAA College Division / Division III independent) (1969–1973)
1969	Samford	2–6–1			
1970	Samford	5–5			
1971	Samford	8–1			V Stagg
1972	Samford	5–3–2			
1973	Samford	4–5			
Samford:		25–20–3			
North Alabama Lions (Gulf South Conference) (1977–1987)
1977	North Alabama	5–5	3–5	T–6th	
1978	North Alabama	7–2–1	4–2–1	5th	
1979	North Alabama	6–5	3–3	4th	
1980	North Alabama	10–2	6–0	1st	L NCAA Division II Football Semifinal
1981	North Alabama	8–2	4–2	T–2nd	
1982	North Alabama	7–3	4–3	3rd	
1983	North Alabama	11–1–1	8–0	1st	L NCAA Division II Football Semifinal
1984	North Alabama	7–1–3	4–1–3	T–2nd	
1985	North Alabama	12–2	7–1	1st	L NCAA Division II Football Championship
1986	North Alabama	4–7	1–7	9th	
1987	North Alabama	7–3–1	4–3–1	3rd	
North Alabama:		84–33–6	48–27–5		
Total:		109–53–9			
National championship Conference title Conference division title or championship game berth
