= Sally Champlin =

American actress

Sally Champlin (often credited as Sally J. Champlin) is an American character actress, director, screenwriter and singer/recording artist.

== Early life ==
Champlin attended Tamalpais High School in Mill Valley, California. After joining the choir, she began professional voice training and performed in several productions before graduating in 1962. After high school, she attended San Francisco State College. Her brother is musician Bill Champlin, a founder of the '60s rock band Sons of Champlin and later a member of Chicago.

== Career ==
Champlin has appeared in such films as Die Watching (1993), starring Christopher Atkins; the television film An Element of Truth (1995), with Donna Mills and Peter Riegert; and the 2000 horror film In the Light of the Moon (aka Ed Gein) starring Steve Railsback. Critics noted her portrayal of quick-witted, earthy bar owner Mary Hogan, one of Gein's victims. Champlin also portrayed the President of the United States in the 2001 film Perfect Lover (aka The Woman Every Man Wants).

She appeared in 10 episodes of The Young and the Restless as Judge Pat Stewart in 2002. She also had a small recurring role in 2009 on the fourth season of Heroes as Lynette, featured in the episodes Shadowboxing and Once Upon a Time In Texas. Other television shows Champlin has appeared on include Dallas, Murphy Brown (in 3 episodes as Maureen), Frasier, Designing Women, Beverly Hills, 90210, and Mike & Molly.
