= Ben Schwartzwalder =

American football player and coach (1909–1993)

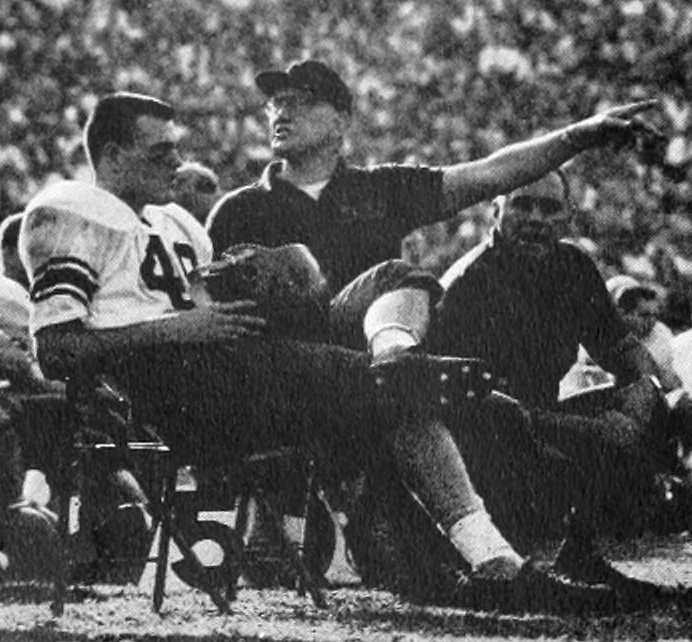
- Schwartzwalder with quarterback Dick Easterly at the Los Angeles Memorial Coliseum, 1959

Biographical details
- Born: June 2, 1909; Point Pleasant, West Virginia, U.S.
- Died: April 28, 1993 (aged 83); St. Petersburg, Florida, U.S.

Playing career
- 1930–1932: West Virginia
- Position: Center

Coaching career (HC unless noted)
- 1935: Sistersville HS (WV)
- 1936–1940: Parkersburg HS (WV)
- 1941: Canton McKinley HS (OH)
- 1946–1948: Muhlenberg
- 1949–1973: Syracuse

Head coaching record
- Overall: 178–96–3 (college)
- Bowls: 2–5

Accomplishments and honors

Championships
- 1 National (1959)

Awards
- AFCA Coach of the Year (1959); Eddie Robinson Coach of the Year (1959); Amos Alonzo Stagg Award (1977)
- College Football Hall of Fame; Inducted in 1982 (profile)

Floyd Burdette "Ben" Schwartzwalder (June 2, 1909 – April 28, 1993) was an American football coach at Syracuse University, where he trained future National Football League (NFL) stars such as Jim Brown, Larry Csonka, Floyd Little and Ernie Davis, the first African American to win the Heisman Trophy. He is in the school's Hall of Fame

Schwartzwalder was also a hero of the D-Day invasion and several other important engagements of World War II.

He played center at West Virginia University, despite weighing only 146 pounds, and was an all-campus wrestler in 1930 in the 155-pound weight class. He was captain of the football team in 1933.

== Early life and career ==
Schwartzwalder was born in Point Pleasant, West Virginia. He coached high school football for six years in West Virginia — a year at Sistersville High School, followed by the Parkersburg High School Big Reds football from 1936 to 1940 — and Ohio — a year at Canton McKinley High School — and won two state championships. In 1941, he was coach of Canton McKinley High School in Ohio when, even though he was in his 30s, he was commissioned in the US Army and fought in World War II.

As a captain in the 82nd Airborne (CO of Company G of the 507th), Schwartzwalder earned a distinction during the invasion of Normandy and battles that followed in the last days of the war. He played key roles in the capture of the La Fière Causeway and Sainte-Mère-Église, crucial points of entry into France during the D-Day invasion. By the time the 507th reached the battle for Hill 95, they had suffered more than 65% casualties. Schwartzwalder continued his campaign all the way into Germany and acted as military governor of the town of Essen for a period of six months. He was awarded a Silver Star, a Bronze Star, a Purple Heart, four battle stars, Presidential Unit Citation and was promoted to the rank of Major for his actions during the invasion. When he was personally decorated by General Matthew Ridgway, the General said "Ben, I never expected to see you here to receive this award."

Even as a paratrooper, Schwartzwalder remained focused on his football career. He organized an athletic league from among the soldiers being assembled in England in preparation for D-Day in order to keep the troops motivated and fit. He coached the 507th PIR football team, leading them through a ten-game season in which the 507th was never defeated and never even scored upon.

== College coaching ==
After returning home, Schwartzwalder began his college coaching career at Muhlenberg College, where he went 25–5. He coached at Syracuse from 1949 to 1973, compiling a 178–96–3 record, and winning one national championship in 1959 while going undefeated with an 11–0 record. The 1959 team was an unprecedented powerhouse with both the toughest offense (313.6 yards rushing, 451.5 yard total and 39 points per game on average) and the toughest defense (giving only 19.3 yards rushing, 96.2 yards total per game on average) in the country. This remains Syracuse's only football national championship to date.

Schwartzwalder's teams went to seven bowl games and won four Lambert Trophies. In 1959, he also won the national coach of the year award. During his 25 years as head coach Syracuse teams outrushed their opponents by more than 22,000 yards.

Schwartzwalder had a knack for developing excellent running backs through their college careers, including Heisman Trophy winner Ernie Davis, Jim Brown, Floyd Little, Jim Nance, and Larry Csonka.

Schwartzwalder had a significant history of recruiting and developing black players during the 1950s and 1960s when many other major programs refused to do so. He coached the first African-American to win a Heisman Trophy and maintained team unity and cohesiveness in a racially charged environment to defeat the all-white Texas Longhorns in the 1960 Cotton Bowl Classic and win a national championship.

== Personal life ==
In 1973, Schwartzwalder retired from coaching and moved to St. Petersburg, Florida. Following his death in 1993, Schwartzwalder was survived by his daughters, Susan Walker and Mary Scofield. His wife Ruth "Reggie" Schwartzwalder died on August 25, 2012, aged 100. He is buried in the Onondaga County Veterans Memorial Cemetery in Syracuse, NY.

== Legacy ==
In 1967, Schwartzwalder was elected president of the American Football Coaches Association. He was inducted into the College Football Hall of Fame in 1982. On September 23, 2023, prior to the game against Army, his name was placed in the Ring of Honor in the JMA Wireless Dome on the campus of Syracuse University.

The coach is also remembered through the Ben Schwartzwalder Trophy which, goes to the winner of each game between West Virginia University (where he had played as a college student) and Syracuse University. The trophy was established in 1993 and was sculpted by Syracuse sports hall-of-famer Jim Ridlon.

=== The Express ===
Schwartzwalder is portrayed by actor Dennis Quaid in the 2008 Universal Pictures film The Express: The Ernie Davis Story, a biographical film about Syracuse University Heisman Trophy winner Ernie Davis.

== Head coaching record ==
=== College ===
Year	Team	Overall	Conference	Standing	Bowl/playoffs	Coaches^{#}	AP^{°}
Muhlenberg Mules (Independent) (1946–1948)
1946	Muhlenberg	9–1			W Tobacco		
1947	Muhlenberg	9–1					
1948	Muhlenberg	7–3					
Muhlenberg:		25–5					
Syracuse Orangemen (Independent) (1949–1973)
1949	Syracuse	4–5					
1950	Syracuse	5–5					
1951	Syracuse	5–4					
1952	Syracuse	7–3			L Orange		14
1953	Syracuse	5–3–1					
1954	Syracuse	4–4					
1955	Syracuse	5–3					
1956	Syracuse	7–2			L Cotton	8	8
1957	Syracuse	5–3–1					
1958	Syracuse	8–2			L Orange	10	9
1959	Syracuse	11–0			W Cotton	1	1
1960	Syracuse	7–2					19
1961	Syracuse	8–3			W Liberty	16	14
1962	Syracuse	5–5					
1963	Syracuse	8–2				12	
1964	Syracuse	7–4			L Sugar	12	
1965	Syracuse	7–3				19	
1966	Syracuse	8–3			L Gator	16	
1967	Syracuse	8–2				12	
1968	Syracuse	6–4					
1969	Syracuse	5–5					
1970	Syracuse	6–4					
1971	Syracuse	5–5–1					
1972	Syracuse	5–6					
1973	Syracuse	2–9					
Syracuse:		153–91–3					
Total:		178–96–3					
National championship Conference title Conference division title or championship game berth
^{#}Rankings from final Coaches Poll.; ^{°}Rankings from final AP Poll.

== See also ==
- List of teachers portrayed in films
