= Die Watching =

- DVD cover
- Directed by: Charles Davis
- Written by: Kenneth J. Hall
- Produced by: Nanda Rao
- Starring: Christopher Atkins; Tim Thomerson; Carlos Palomino; Vali Ashton
- Cinematography: Howard Wexler
- Edited by: Clayton Halsey
- Music by: David Scott Cohen; Scott Roewe
- Distributed by: New World Pictures
- Release date: August 25, 1993
- Running time: 88 minutes
- Country: United States
- Language: English

Die Watching is a 1993 American direct-to-video erotic thriller film starring former teen idol Christopher Atkins as a psychotic pornographic film director named Michael Terrence, who moonlights as a voyeuristic murderer. The story borrows heavily from Michael Powell's British film Peeping Tom (1960). It was originally released on VHS in the United States on August 25, 1993, and on DVD by Image Entertainment in 1999. It is the last film to be released by New World Pictures.

== Plot ==
Scarred by repressed memories of his late mother, Michael Terrence overcomes his inner pain through the merciless slaughter of various women. His killing spree characterizes a very peculiar modus operandi: he films each murder with his video camera and forces each victim to watch the film as they die. However, his dark side is penetrated via the romantic attentions of pretty neighbor Nola Carlisle (Vali Ashton), who seems intent on learning all she can about her handsome new friend.

== Cast ==
- Christopher Atkins - Michael Terrence
- Vali Ashton - Nola Carlisle
- Mike Jacobs Jr. - Adam Parker
- Tim Thomerson - Detective Lewis
- Carlos Palomino - Detective Barry
- Erika Nann - Gabrielle
- Sally Champlin - Julienne
- Michael E. Bauer - Jake
- Ewing Miles Brown - Lucky, studio director
- Melanie Good - Sheila Walsh
- Avalon Anders - Marie
- Allen Fawcett - Michael's father
- Ashley F. Brooks - Michael's mother
- Matthew J. Boyle - young Michael
- Tammy Elaine - girl #1
