= Lee McLaughlin (actor) =

American actor

Lee McLaughlin (4 May 1936 – 20 September 2007) was an American stunt man and film and television actor from Pennsylvania. He had minor roles in the television shows Bonanza, Starsky & Hutch, CHiPs, and Fantasy Island and the films Bound for Glory, Silver Streak, The Car, Elvira, Mistress of the Dark.

== Biography ==
McLaughlin was born in Chester, Pennsylvania. His acting career began in 1969 with a bit part in "Bonanza", which was the first of three appearances on the show. He had minor roles in Up Your Alley in 1971, "Starsky & Hutch" in 1975, and Silver Streak and Bound For Glory in 1976. He returned to television with other minor roles, including "Switch", "One Day at a Time", "Starsky & Hutch", and "CHiPs", as well as a bit part in the film The Car in 1977.

In 1978, he did "Fantasy Island", his third and final "Starsky & Hutch", and The Cheap Detective.

His final acting credit was 2003's Greasewood Flat.

McLaughlin died on 20 September 2007 in Northridge, California.

== Filmography ==
Year	Title	Role	Notes
1969-1972	Bonanza	Clerk / 2nd Poker Player / Bum #2	3 episodes
1971	Up Your Alley	Sissy	
1975-1978	Starsky & Hutch	Earl / Al O'Riley / Frisco Fats	3 episodes
1976	Silver Streak	Fat Man #2	
1976	Bound for Glory	Heavy Chandler - "Insane" Man	
1977	Switch	Bodyguard	Episode: "The Snitch"
1977	One Day at a Time	Beer Belly	Episode: "Schneider Loves Ginny"
1977	The Car	Marvin Fats	
1977	CHiPs	Onion Driver	Episode: "Taking Its Toll"
1978	Fantasy Island	The Bartender	Episode: "The Prince/The Sheriff"
1978	The Cheap Detective	Fat Man	
1981	Back Roads	Deputy	
1985	Gus Brown and Midnight Brewster		TV movie
1985	The Fall Guy		Episode: "Dead Ringer"
1988	Bonanza: The Next Generation	The Mayor	TV movie
1988	Elvira: Mistress of the Dark	Earl Hooter	
1993	The Skateboard Kid	Sheriff	
1994	Forced to Kill	Bartender	
1996	Raven Hawk	Dunbar	TV movie
1996	Baby Face Nelson	Farmer	
1996	Renegade	Fat Ernie	Episode: "High Rollers"
2000	Ed Gein	Warren Hill	
2003	Greasewood Flat	Jim	(final film role)
