= Dick Easterly =

American gridiron football player (born 1939)

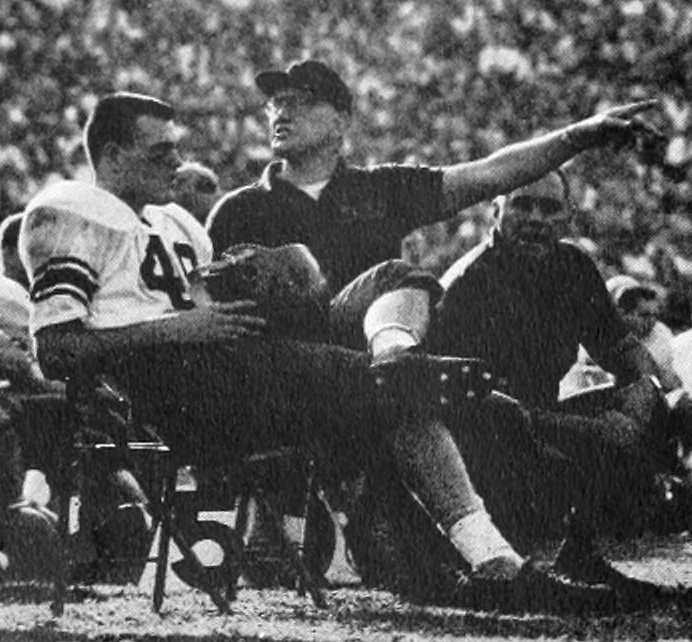
- Easterly with Syracuse head coach Ben Schwartzwalder at the Los Angeles Coliseum, 1959

Profile
- Positions: QB, End

Personal information
- Born: April 13, 1939 (age 87); New York, U.S.
- Listed height: 5 ft 11 in (1.80 m)
- Listed weight: 185 lb (84 kg)

Career information
- High school: Syracuse (NY) North
- College: Syracuse
- NFL draft: 1962: 14th round, 190th overall pick

Career history
- 1962–1964: Hamilton Tiger-Cats

Awards and highlights
- Grey Cup champion (1963); National champion (1959)

Richard B. Easterly (born April 13, 1939) is an American former football player. He played wide receiver the Hamilton Tiger-Cats of the Canadian Football League (CFL), and won the Grey Cup with the Tiger-Cats in 1963.

Easterly played college football at Syracuse University, participating in the Syracuse University 1959 National Football Cotton Bowl, Orange Bowl, Liberty Bowl where he was the MVP, Blue Gray Game, North/South Game, and the US Bowl. He also went to the College Baseball World Series. He was invited to training camp for the San Francisco 49ers but wound up playing for the Hamilton Tiger-Cats from 1962 to 1964. In his first CFL game, he scored two touchdowns. His most productive period was his rookie season, when, despite playing just four games, he caught 15 passes for 378 yards (25.2 yards/catch), one for 79 yards, and five touchdowns. He also caught 15 passes in 1963 but only one in 1964. He also served as a punt and kick returner.

In 2012, Easterley was inducted into the Greater Syracuse Sports Hall of Fame.
