= Bubba Scott =

American football coach and administrator (1927–2012)

Biographical details
- Born: April 24, 1927; Prattville, Alabama, U.S.
- Died: March 11, 2012 (aged 84); Montgomery, Alabama, U.S.

Playing career
- 1948: Troy State

Coaching career (HC unless noted)
- 1952–1963: Haleyville HS (AL)
- 1963–1965: Howard (AL)

Administrative career (AD unless noted)
- 1966–1990: AHSAA (executive director)

Head coaching record
- Overall: 13–13–2 (college); 76–21–3 (high school)

Herman L. "Bubba" Scott (April 24, 1927 – March 11, 2012) was an American football coach and athletics administrator. He served as the head football coach at Howard College—now known as Samford University— in Homewood, Alabama from 1963 to 1965 and as the executive director of the Alabama High School Athletic Association from 1966 to 1990.

== Head coaching record ==
=== College ===
Year	Team	Overall	Conference	Standing	Bowl/playoffs
Howard Bulldogs (NCAA College Division independent) (1963–1965)
1963	Howard	5–3–1			
1964	Howard	4–4–1			
1965	Howard	4–6			
Howard:		13–13–2			
Total:		13–13–2			
