= Lee McLaughlin (American football) =

American football player and coach (1917–1968)

Biographical details
- Born: February 28, 1917; Brownsburg, Virginia, U.S.
- Died: August 13, 1968 (aged 51); Lexington, Virginia, U.S.

Playing career
- 1938–1940: Virginia
- 1941: Green Bay Packers
- Position: Guard

Coaching career (HC unless noted)
- c. 1950: Episcopal HS (VA)
- 1957–1967: Washington and Lee

Head coaching record
- Overall: 48–43–4 (college)

Accomplishments and honors

Championships
- 1 CAC (1962)

Lee Massey McLaughlin (February 28, 1917 – August 13, 1968) was an American football player with the Green Bay Packers of the National Football League (NFL) and a head football coach at Washington and Lee University.

== Biography ==
McLaughlin was born on February 28, 1917, in Brownsburg, Virginia. During World War II, he served as an officer in the United States Navy Lee also went on to start Camp Maxwelton and Camp Lachlan with his wife Rosa in Lexington, Va. He died on August 13, 1968.

== Playing career ==
McLaughlin was the captain of the track team and played football at the collegiate level for the University of Virginia. He was subsequently drafted and played Guard for the Green Bay Packers, starting all eight games of the 1941 NFL season, before leaving football to fight in World War II.

== Coaching career ==
After the war, McLaughlin began coaching for Episcopal High School in Alexandria, Virginia. After successful seasons coaching at the high school level, McLaughlin was named head football coach at Washington and Lee University in 1957. There he the team to the National Small College Championship in 1961 and was named National College Coach of the Year that season. In 1966, he was awarded the Sports Illustrated Silver Anniversary Award.

He was inducted into the Virginia Sports Hall of Fame in 1987.

== Head coaching record ==
=== College ===
Year	Team	Overall	Conference	Standing	Bowl/playoffs
Washington and Lee Generals (Independent) (1957–1961)
1957	Washington and Lee	0–8			
1958	Washington and Lee	1–7			
1959	Washington and Lee	3–4–1			
1960	Washington and Lee	8–0–1			
1961	Washington and Lee	9–0			
Washington and Lee Generals (College Athletic Conference) (1962–1963)
1962	Washington and Lee	8–1	3–0	1st	
1963	Washington and Lee	5–3	2–1	2nd	
Washington and Lee Generals (College Athletic Conference / Virginia Little Eight Conference) (1964–1965)
1964	Washington and Lee	4–5	2–2 / 1–2	3rd / 5th	
1965	Washington and Lee	3–6	1–3 / 1–2	4th / 4th	
Washington and Lee Generals (College Athletic Conference) (1966–1967)
1966	Washington and Lee	2–5–2	1–3	T–4th	
1967	Washington and Lee	5–4	2–2	T–2nd	
Washington and Lee:		48–43–4	13–15		
Total:		48–43–4			
National championship Conference title Conference division title or championship game berth
