= Jim Vollenweider =

American football player (1939-1998)

No. 33, 35
- Position: Halfback

Personal information
- Born: September 2, 1939; Schofield, Wisconsin, U.S.
- Died: June 1, 1998 (aged 58) 'Ewa Beach, Hawaii, U.S.
- Listed height: 6 ft 1 in (1.85 m)
- Listed weight: 205 lb (93 kg)

Career information
- High school: D.C. Everest (Weston, Wisconsin)
- College: Miami (FL) (1958–1961)
- NFL draft: 1962: 8th round, 106th overall pick
- AFL draft: 1962: 18th round, 137th overall pick

Career history
- San Francisco 49ers (1962–1963); Toronto Argonauts (1964)

Career NFL statistics
- Rushing yards: 161
- Rushing average: 2.8
- Receptions: 5
- Receiving yards: 47
- Total touchdowns: 2
- Stats at Pro Football Reference

Jim Vollenweider (September 2, 1989 - June 1, 1998) was a player in the National Football League (NFL) for the San Francisco 49ers in 1962 and 1963 as a halfback. He played at the collegiate level at the University of Miami. Vollenweider was drafted in the eighth round of the 1962 NFL draft by the 49ers. He was also drafted in the eighteenth round of the 1962 American Football League draft by the Oakland Raiders.

== Personal Life ==
James Stephen Vollenweider was born on September 2, 1939. He attended D.C. Everest High School in Weston, Wisconsin. Vollenweider died June 1, 1998, in 'Ewa Beach, Hawaii.
