= John Lee Armstrong =

American football player and coach (1932–2012)

Biographical details
- Born: December 15, 1932; Attalla, Alabama, U.S.
- Died: November 1, 2012 (aged 79); Birmingham, Alabama, U.S.

Playing career
- 1950–1953: Howard (AL)

Coaching career (HC unless noted)
- 1965: Woodlawn HS (AL)
- 1966–1968: Samford
- 1972–1977: E.B. Erwin (AL)

Head coaching record
- Overall: 20–9–2 (college); 34–32–3 (high school)

John Lee Armstrong (December 15, 1932 – November 1, 2012) was an American football player and coach. He was a college football player at Howard College—now known as Samford University—in Homewood, Alabama from 1950 to 1953. Armstrong returned to his alma mater to serve as head football coach from 1966 to 1968, compiling a record of 20–9–2.

== Head coaching record ==
=== College ===
Year	Team	Overall	Conference	Standing	Bowl/playoffs
Samford Bulldogs (NCAA College Division independent) (1966–1968)
1966	Samford	6–3–1			
1967	Samford	8–2–1			
1968	Samford	6–4			
Samford:		20–9–2			
Total:		20–9–2			

=== High school ===
Year	Team	Overall	Conference	Standing	Bowl/playoffs
Woodlawn Colonels () (1965)
1965	Woodlawn	4–4–1			
Woodlawn:		4–4–1			
E.B. Erwin Eagles () (1972–1977)
1972	E.B. Erwin	6–4			
1973	E.B. Erwin	7–2–1			
1974	E.B. Erwin	5–5			
1975	E.B. Erwin	1–8–1	1–3		
1976	E.B. Erwin	8–2	3–1		
1977	E.B. Erwin	3–7	2–2		
E.B. Erwin:		30–28–2	6–6		
Total:		34–32–3			
