= 1961 Tampa Spartans football team =

American college football season

1961 Tampa Spartans football
- Conference: Independent
- Record: 8–1
- Head coach: Marcelino Huerta (10th season)
- Home stadium: Phillips Field

1961 NAIA independents football records
	Conf.			Overall
Team	W	L	T	W		L		T
No. 2 Baldwin–Wallace		–		9	–	0	–	0
No. 8 Tampa		–		8	–	1	–	0
Westminster (UT)		–		7	–	1	–	1
Earlham		–		7	–	1	–	0
Oklahoma Panhandle State		–		9	–	2	–	0
La Verne		–		7	–	2	–	0
Hillsdale		–		6	–	3	–	0
Eastern New Mexico		–		6	–	4	–	0
McMurry		–		6	–	4	–	0
St. Mary of the Plains		–		4	–	5	–	0
Georgetown (KY)		–		2	–	3	–	1
Austin		–		2	–	7	–	0
Rankings from NAIA poll

The 1961 Tampa Spartans football team was an American football team that represented the University of Tampa as an independent during the 1961 college football season. In their 25th season of college football and their 10th season under head coach Marcelino Huerta, the Spartans compiled an 8–1 record and outscored opponents by a total of 188 to 98.

Huerta resigned as the Spartans' head coach on January 8, 1962, to take the same position at Wichita State.

The team played its home games at Phillips Field in Tampa, Florida.

== Schedule ==
Date	Opponent	Site	Result	Attendance	Source
September 23	Livingston State	Phillips Field; Tampa, FL	W 41–8	7,800–8,000	
September 30	Western Carolina	Phillips Field; Tampa, FL	W 24–14	7,000	
October 14	Elon	Phillips Field; Tampa, FL	W 13–0	5,000	
October 21	at Presbyterian	Bailey Stadium; Clinton, SC	W 17–16	3,500	
October 28	at No. 4 Southeastern Louisiana	Strawberry Stadium; Hammond, LA	L 3–27	6,500–8,000	
November 4	at Troy State	Veterans Memorial Stadium; Troy, AL	W 27–6	3,000	
November 11	No. 4 Northern Michigan	Phillips Field; Tampa, FL	W 27–6	8,500–9,000	
November 18	Appalachian State	Phillips Field; Tampa, FL	W 14–0	8,500–10,000	
November 25	Wofford	Phillips Field; Tampa, FL	W 22–21	6,500	
Rankings from AP Poll released prior to the game

== Statistics ==
The team gained 2,203 yards of total offense (244.8 yards per game), consisting of 1,500 rushing yards (166.6 yards per game) and 803 passing yards (79.2 yards per game). On defense, the Spartans held opponents to 1,689 yards (187.7 yards per game) with 1,250 rushing yards and 439 passing yards.

Quarterback Vaden Bessent led the team in both passing (38-for-65, 557 yards, six touchdowns, zero interceptions) and total offense (627 yards).

The team's leading rushers were fullback Bob Moore (356 yards, 82 carries) and Dick O'Brien (232 yards, 56 carries). Moore also led the team in scoring with 60 points on 10 touchdowns.

The leading receivers were halfback Dick O'Brien (12 receptions, 157 yards) and end Charlie Rose (12 receptions, 137 yards).

== Players ==
- Charles Bailey, end and captain, wenior, 6'1", 195 pounds
- Bob Banks, tackle, junior, 6'1", 225 pounds
- Vaden Bessent, quarterback, sophomore, 6'0", 165 pounds
- Jim Caldwell, halfback, freshman, 5'9", 180 pounds
- Bill Croft, guard, junior, 5'9", 220 pounds
- Max Davis, tackle, junior, 6'1", 210 pounds
- Jim Galmin, end, sophomore, 6'4", 215 pounds
- Paul Gore, center, junior, 6'1", 210 pounds
- Bob Moore, fullback, sophomore, 6'1", 230 pounds
- Jim Neve, guard, sophomore, 5'9", 200 pounds
- Dick O'Brien, halfback, sophomore, 5'11", 175 pounds
- Wayne "Buddy" Owen, quarterback, 6'0", 165 pounds
- Ronnie Perez, quarterback, junior, 6'1", 200 pounds
- Charles Rose, end, junior, 6'1", 190 pounds
- Gene Rowell, guard, freshman, 5'10", 195 pounds
- Don Scott, tackle, junior 6'2", 250 pounds
- Ernie Stout, halfback, sophomore, 6'1", 185 pounds
- Blaine Turner, tackle, sophomore, 6'2", 225 pounds
