= 1962 American Football League draft =

American Football League draft

1962 AFL draft

General information
- Date: December 2, 1961, February 23, 1962

Overview
- 272 total selections in 34 rounds
- League: AFL
- First selection: Roman Gabriel, QB; Oakland Raiders
- Mr. Irrelevant: Phil Lohman, C San Diego Chargers
- Hall of Famers: 3

The 1962 American Football League draft was held on December 2, 1961 for rounds 1-25 and February 23, 1962 for rounds 26-28. Rounds 29-34 included players drafted by the NFL in 1961 and occurred before the 1962 AFL draft. With the first overall pick, the Oakland Raiders selected quarterback Roman Gabriel.

In addition to the normal draft, the AFL held an "equalization draft" on August 15th, in which teams were able to draft players off the rosters of other teams - or their own. The two lowest-ranking teams, Oakland and Denver, were allowed to select up to 6 players and the other six were allowed to select up to 4.

== Player selections ==
= Pro Bowler (Note: Players are identified as a Pro Bowler if they were selected for the Pro Bowl at any time in their career.)	= AFL All-Star (Note: Players are identified as an All-Star if they were selected for the All-Star game at any time in their career.)	= Hall of Famer

=== Round 1 ===
Pick #	AFL team	Player	Position	College
1	Oakland Raiders	Roman Gabriel	QB	NC State
2	Denver Broncos	Merlin Olsen	DT	Utah State
3	Dallas Texans	Ronnie Bull	RB	Baylor
4	Buffalo Bills	Ernie Davis	HB	Syracuse
5	New York Titans	Sandy Stephens	QB	Minnesota
6	Boston Patriots	Gary Collins	FL	Maryland
7	Houston Oilers	Ray Jacobs	DT	Howard Payne
8	San Diego Chargers	Bob Ferguson	FB	Ohio State

=== Round 2 ===
Pick #	AFL team	Player	Position	College
9	Oakland Raiders	Lance Alworth	FL	Arkansas
10	Denver Broncos	Jerry Hillebrand	LB	Colorado
11	Dallas Texans	Bill Miller	SE	Miami (FL)
12	Buffalo Bills	Glenn Glass	DB	Tennessee
13	New York Titans	Alex Kroll	OT	Rutgers
14	Boston Patriots	Leroy Jackson	HB	Western Illinois
15	Houston Oilers	Earl Gros	FB	LSU
16	San Diego Chargers	Dick Hudson	OT	Memphis State

=== Round 3 ===
Pick #	AFL team	Player	Position	College
17	Oakland Raiders	Ed Pine	LB	Utah
18	Denver Broncos	Charles Holmes	FB	Maryland State
19	Dallas Texans	Eddie Wilson	QB	Arizona
20	Buffalo Bills	Jack Elwell	WR	Purdue
21	New York Titans	Fate Echols	OT	Northwestern
22	Boston Patriots	Sherwyn Thorson	G	Iowa
23	Houston Oilers	Pete Case	G	Georgia
24	San Diego Chargers	John Hadl	QB	Kansas

=== Round 4 ===
Pick #	AFL team	Player	Position	College
25	Oakland Raiders	John Meyers	DT	Washington
26	Denver Broncos	John Furman	QB	Texas Western
27	Dallas Texans	Chuck Hinton	DT	North Carolina Central
28	Dallas Texans	Irv Goode	G	Kentucky
29	New York Titans	Ed Blaine	G	Missouri
30	Houston Oilers	Gary Cutsinger	DE	Oklahoma State
31	San Diego Chargers	Bob Bill	OT	Notre Dame
32	San Diego Chargers	Mack Burton	HB	San José State

=== Round 5 ===
Pick #	AFL team	Player	Position	College
33	Oakland Raiders	Joe Hernandez	WR	Arizona
34	San Diego Chargers	Robert Mitinger	LB	Penn State
35	Dallas Texans	Bobby Plummer	OT	TCU
36	Buffalo Bills	Tom Dellinger	HB	NC State
37	New York Titans	Bobby Ply	DB	Baylor
38	Boston Patriots	Bill Hull	DE	Wake Forest
39	Houston Oilers	Bill Rice	E	Alabama
40	San Diego Chargers	John Cornett	OT	Rice

=== Round 6 ===
Pick #	AFL team	Player	Position	College
41	Oakland Raiders	Dan Birdwell	DT	Houston
42	San Diego Chargers	Roy Winston	LB	LSU
43	Dallas Texans	Al Hinton	E	Iowa
44	Buffalo Bills	Dave Viti	E	Boston University
45	New York Titans	Mel Melin	QB	Washington State
46	Boston Patriots	Billy Neighbors	G	Alabama
47	Houston Oilers	Ray Pinion	G	TCU
48	San Diego Chargers	Frank Buncom	LB	USC

=== Round 7 ===
Pick #	AFL team	Player	Position	College
49	Oakland Raiders	Jim Norris	DT	Houston
50	Denver Broncos	John McGeever	CB	Auburn
51	San Diego Chargers	Wendell Harris	CB	LSU
52	Buffalo Bills	Jim LeCompte	G	North Carolina
53	New York Titans	George Mans	E	Michigan
54	Boston Patriots	John Schopf	OT	Michigan
55	Houston Oilers	Gus Gonzales	G	Tulane
56	San Diego Chargers	Bob Jackson	FB	New Mexico State

=== Round 8 ===
Pick #	AFL team	Player	Position	College
57	Oakland Raiders	Ferrell Yarborough	E	Northwestern State
58	Denver Broncos	Elbert Harris	HB	Southeastern Louisiana
59	Dallas Texans	Larry Bowie	G	Purdue
60	Buffalo Bills	Paul White	HB	Florida
61	New York Titans	John Lomakowski	OT	Western Michigan
62	Boston Patriots	Bennie McRae	CB	Michigan
63	Houston Oilers	Clyde Brock	OT	Utah State
64	San Diego Chargers	Jerry Robinson	FL	Grambling

=== Round 9 ===
Pick #	AFL team	Player	Position	College
65	Oakland Raiders	Jim Dillard	HB	Oklahoma State
66	Denver Broncos	Larry Jepson	C	Furman
67	Dallas Texans	Marshall Shirk	OT	UCLA
68	Buffalo Bills	Bill Saul	LB	Penn State
69	New York Titans	Gary Barnes	WR	Clemson
70	Boston Patriots	Bill Triplett	RB	Miami (OH)
71	Houston Oilers	Larry Onesti	LB	Northwestern
72	San Diego Chargers	Tom Minter	DB	Baylor

=== Round 10 ===
Pick #	AFL team	Player	Position	College
73	Oakland Raiders	Hank Rivera	DB	Oregon State
74	Denver Broncos	Gale Weidner	QB	Colorado
75	Dallas Texans	Jimmy Saxton	HB	Texas
76	Buffalo Bills	Amos Bullocks	HB	Southern Illinois
77	New York Titans	Ted Stute	OT	Ohio
78	Boston Patriots	John Knight	HB	Valparaiso
79	Houston Oilers	Bob Moses	E	Texas
80	San Diego Chargers	Dan Sullivan	G	Boston College

=== Round 11 ===
Pick #	AFL team	Player	Position	College
81	Dallas Texans	Bobby Hunt	S	Auburn
82	Denver Broncos	Mike Kline	G	Oregon State
83	Dallas Texans	Guy Reese	DT	SMU
84	Buffalo Bills	Jerry Croft	G	Bowling Green
85	New York Titans	Curtis Miranda	C	Florida A&M
86	Buffalo Bills	Tom Pennington	E / K	Georgia
87	Houston Oilers	John Thomas	G	McMurry
88	San Diego Chargers	Sonny Bishop	G	Fresno State

=== Round 12 ===
Pick #	AFL team	Player	Position	College
89	Oakland Raiders	Jim Skaggs	G	Washington
90	New York Titans	Bill Winter	OT	West Virginia
91	Dallas Texans	Bobby Thompson	DB	Arizona
92	Oakland Raiders	Gary Schwertfeger	LB	Montana
93	San Diego Chargers	Ralph Smith	TE	Ole Miss
94	Oakland Raiders	Oscar Donahue	WR	San José State
95	Houston Oilers	Jack Collins	HB	Texas
96	San Diego Chargers	George Andrie	DE	Marquette (Note: The Warriors discounted football after 1960, however he stayed at the university and was selected out of Marquette.)

=== Round 13 ===
Pick #	AFL team	Player	Position	College
97	Oakland Raiders	George Pierovich	FB	California
98	Denver Broncos	Bob Cegelski	C	Montana State
99	Buffalo Bills	Ron Gassert	DT	Virginia
100	Buffalo Bills	Mike Stratton	LB	Tennessee
101	New York Titans	Wilburn Hollis	QB	Iowa
102	Boston Patriots	Nick Buoniconti	LB	Notre Dame
103	Houston Oilers	Royce Cassell	E	New Mexico State
104	San Diego Chargers	Chuck Bryant	E	Ohio State

=== Round 14 ===
Pick #	AFL team	Player	Position	College
105	Oakland Raiders	Bert Coan	HB	Kansas
106	Denver Broncos	Sonny Gibbs	QB	TCU
107	Dallas Texans	Bookie Bolin	G	Ole Miss
108	Buffalo Bills	Ron Scufca	OT	Purdue
109	New York Titans	Bert Wilder	DE	NC State
110	Boston Patriots	Chuck Sieminski	DT	Penn State
111	Houston Oilers	Glynn Griffing	QB	Ole Miss
112	San Diego Chargers	Jim Bates	HB	USC

=== Round 15 ===
Pick #	AFL team	Player	Position	College
113	Oakland Raiders	Floyd Dean	LB	Florida
114	Denver Broncos	Bill Louden	G	St. Benedict's (KS)
115	Dallas Texans	Dave Graham	OT	Virginia
116	Buffalo Bills	Roger Kochman	HB	Penn State
117	New York Titans	Sam Mudie	HB	Rutgers
118	Boston Patriots	Gerry Goerlitz	C	Northern Michigan
119	Houston Oilers	Ken Shaffer	OT	Marquette
120	San Diego Chargers	Fred Moore	DT	Memphis State

=== Round 16 ===
Pick #	AFL team	Player	Position	College
121	Oakland Raiders	Pat Russ	DT	Purdue
122	Denver Broncos	Gary Ballman	FL	Michigan State
123	Dallas Texans	Pettis Norman	TE	Johnson C. Smith
124	Buffalo Bills	Frank Imperiale	OT	Southern Illinois
125	New York Titans	Jim Smith	OT	Penn State
126	Boston Patriots	Ken Byers	G	Cincinnati
127	Houston Oilers	Billy Ray Adams	FB	Ole Miss

=== Round 17 ===
Pick #	AFL team	Player	Position	College
129	Oakland Raiders	Larry Ferguson	HB	Iowa
130	Denver Broncos	Jerry Tarr	WR	Oregon
131	Dallas Texans	Tommy Brooker	E	Alabama
132	Buffalo Bills	Tom Sestak	DT	McNeese State
133	New York Titans	Allen Miller	LB	Ohio
134	Boston Patriots	Scott Maentz	E	Michigan
135	Houston Oilers	Bill Miller	DT	New Mexico Highlands
136	San Diego Chargers	Frank Gardner	OT	North Carolina Central

=== Round 18 ===
Pick #	AFL team	Player	Position	College
137	Oakland Raiders	Jim Vollenweider	HB	Miami (FL)
138	Denver Broncos	Pete Schenck	E	Washington State
139	Dallas Texans	Joe Carollo	OT	Notre Dame
140	Buffalo Bills	Joe Kehoe	E	Virginia
141	New York Titans	Buddy Iles	E	TCU
142	Boston Patriots	Tom Chandler	OT	Florida A&M
143	Houston Oilers	Art Perkins	FB	North Texas State
144	San Diego Chargers	Dennis Biodrowski	G	Memphis State

=== Round 19 ===
Pick #	AFL team	Player	Position	College
145	Oakland Raiders	Dennis Spurlock	QB	Whitworth
146	Oakland Raiders	Kent Horne	OT	BYU
147	Dallas Texans	Lee Welch	HB	Mississippi State
148	Buffalo Bills	Bill Johnson	LB	Southeastern Louisiana
149	New York Titans	Reed Bohovich	G	Lehigh
150	Boston Patriots	Ron Meyers	E	Villanova
151	Houston Oilers	Bobby Jancik	CB	Lamar Tech

=== Round 20 ===
Pick #	AFL team	Player	Position	College
153	Oakland Raiders	John Sutro	OT	San José State
154	Denver Broncos	Mike Martin	E	Washington State
155	Dallas Texans	Mike Semcheski	G	Lehigh
156	Buffalo Bills	Sam Tidmore	LB	Ohio State
157	New York Titans	Judge Dickson	FB	Minnesota
158	Boston Patriots	Tommy Neck	DB	LSU
159	Houston Oilers	Joe Isbell	G	Houston
160	San Diego Chargers	Ron Herman	QB	Bradley

=== Round 21 ===
Pick #	AFL team	Player	Position	College
161	Oakland Raiders	Bill Tunnicliff	FB	Michigan
162	Denver Broncos	Jim Perkins	OT	Colorado
163	Dallas Texans	Kent Martin	OT	Wake Forest
164	Buffalo Bills	Carey Henley	HB	Chattanooga
165	New York Titans	Ron Hatcher	FB	Michigan State
166	Boston Patriots	John Traynham	HB	VMI
167	Houston Oilers	Roland Jackson	FB	Rice
168	San Diego Chargers	Jesse Williams	C	Fresno State

=== Round 22 ===
Pick #	AFL team	Player	Position	College
169	Oakland Raiders	Jim Cadile	G	San José State
170	Denver Broncos	Don Kasso	HB	Oregon State
171	Dallas Texans	Jim Bernhardt	OT	Linfield
172	Buffalo Bills	Tom Hall	WR	Minnesota
173	New York Titans	Tom Nolan	OT	Pennsylvania Military
174	Boston Patriots	Bob Asack	OT	Columbia
175	Houston Oilers	Kenny Bolin	HB	Houston
176	San Diego Chargers	Jim Thibert	LB	Toledo

=== Round 23 ===
Pick #	AFL team	Player	Position	College
177	Oakland Raiders	Elvin Basham	G	Kansas
178	Denver Broncos	Ken Tureaud	HB	Michigan
179	Dallas Texans	Russ Foret	OT	Georgia Tech
180	Buffalo Bills	Ray Abruzzese	S	Alabama
181	New York Titans	John Kuprok	E	Pittsburgh
182	Boston Patriots	Walt Crate	HB	Pennsylvania Military
183	Houston Oilers	Bill Van Buren	C	Iowa
184	San Diego Chargers	Dick Farris	G	North Texas State

=== Round 24 ===
Pick #	AFL team	Player	Position	College
185	Oakland Raiders	Mickey Bruce	HB	Oregon
186	Denver Broncos	Neil Thomas	G	Hillsdale
187	Dallas Texans	Pat Trammell	QB	Alabama
188	Buffalo Bills	Stan Sczurek	LB	Purdue
189	New York Titans	Johnny Counts	HB	Illinois
190	Boston Patriots	Don Christman	C	Richmond
191	Houston Oilers	Boyd Melvin	OT	Northwestern
192	San Diego Chargers	Homer Jones	HB	Texas Southern

=== Round 25 ===
Pick #	AFL team	Player	Position	College
193	Oakland Raiders	Tom Cagaanan	HB	Utah State
194	Denver Broncos	Dave Edwards	LB	Auburn
195	Dallas Texans	John Burrell	WR	Rice
196	Buffalo Bills	Dave Gash	E	Kentucky
197	New York Titans	Russ Warren	HB	Columbia
198	Boston Patriots	Bob Stem	C	Syracuse
199	Houston Oilers	Bob Johnson	OT	Rice
200	San Diego Chargers	Sam Gruneisen	C	Villanova

=== Round 26 ===
Pick #	AFL team	Player	Position	College
201	Oakland Raiders	Fred Miller	DT	LSU
202	Denver Broncos	Jim Roberts	OT	Ole Miss
203	Dallas Texans	Walt Rappold	QB	Duke
204	Buffalo Bills	Ed Reynolds	OT	Tulane
205	New York Titans	Chuck Morris	HB	Ole Miss
206	Boston Patriots	Jimmy Field	QB	LSU
207	Houston Oilers	Harold Hays	LB	Mississippi Southern
208	San Diego Chargers	Mike Woulfe	LB	Colorado

=== Round 27 ===
Pick #	AFL team	Player	Position	College
209	Oakland Raiders	Keith Luhnow	FB	Santa Ana
210	Denver Broncos	Andy Von Sonn	LB	UCLA
211	Dallas Texans	Scott Tyler	HB	Miami (OH)
212	Buffalo Bills	Claude Crabb	CB	Colorado
213	New York Titans	Jerry Archer	C	Pittsburg State
214	Boston Patriots	Albert Gursky	LB	Penn State
215	Houston Oilers	Roger McFarland	HB	Kansas
216	San Diego Chargers	Mel Rideout	QB	Richmond

=== Round 28 ===
Pick #	AFL team	Player	Position	College
217	Oakland Raiders	Marv Marinovich	G	USC
218	Denver Broncos	Paul Holmes	OT	Georgia
219	Dallas Texans	Jim Thrush	OT	Xavier
220	Buffalo Bills	Roy Walker	FB	Purdue
221	New York Titans	Walter Nikirk	OT	Houston
222	Boston Patriots	Charlie Dickerson	OT	Illinois
223	Houston Oilers	Gary Henson	E	Colorado
224	San Diego Chargers	Ben Wilson	FB	USC

=== Round 29 ===
Pick #	AFL team	Player	Position	College
225	Oakland Raiders	Leon Donohue	G	San José State
226	Denver Broncos	Lynn Hoyem	G	Long Beach State
227	Dallas Texans	Ed Ryan	HB	Michigan State
228	Buffalo Bills	Jim Beaver	DT	Florida
229	New York Titans	Frank Parker	DT	Oklahoma State
230	Boston Patriots	Julius Fincke	OT	McNeese State
231	Houston Oilers	Ron Osborne	OT	Clemson
232	San Diego Chargers	Paul Dudley	HB	Arkansas

=== Round 30 ===
Pick #	AFL team	Player	Position	College
233	Oakland Raiders	Pete Nicklas	OT	Baylor
234	Denver Broncos	Walt Mince	HB	Arizona
235	Dallas Texans	Don Goodman	HB	Florida
236	Buffalo Bills	Cody Binkley	C	Vanderbilt
237	New York Titans	Mike McClellan	DB	Oklahoma
238	Boston Patriots	John Finn	OT	Louisville
239	Houston Oilers	Bob Clemens	FB	Pittsburgh
240	San Diego Chargers	John Denvir	G	Colorado

=== Round 31 ===
Pick #	AFL team	Player	Position	College
241	Oakland Raiders	Bob Elliott	FB	North Carolina
242	Denver Broncos	Bill Williamson	OT	Bakersfield
243	Dallas Texans	Everisto Nino	OT	East Texas State
244	Buffalo Bills	Jim Collier	TE	Arkansas
245	New York Titans	L. E. Hicks	OT	Florida
246	Boston Patriots	Mike Ingram	G	Ohio State
247	Houston Oilers	Al Kimbrough	HB	Northwestern
248	San Diego Chargers	Doug Elmore	P / QB	Ole Miss

=== Round 32 ===
Pick #	AFL team	Player	Position	College
249	Oakland Raiders	Bobby Richards	DE	LSU
250	Denver Broncos	Vester Flanagan	OT	Humboldt State
251	Dallas Texans	Joel Arrington	HB	Duke
252	Buffalo Bills	Ken Ericson	E	Syracuse
253	New York Titans	Don Jonas	HB	Penn State
254	Boston Patriots	Charley Taylor	HB	Ole Miss
255	Houston Oilers	Bernard Wyatt	HB	Iowa
256	San Diego Chargers	Wayne Frazier	C	Auburn

=== Round 33 ===
Pick #	AFL team	Player	Position	College
257	Oakland Raiders	Gene White	HB	Florida A&M
258	Denver Broncos	Duane Allen	TE	Mt. San Antonio
259	Dallas Texans	Jack Wilson	HB	Duke
260	Buffalo Bills	Tony Parrilli	G	Illinois
261	New York Titans	Nick Maravich	OT	NC State
262	Boston Patriots	Steve Jastrzembski	E	Pittsburgh
263	Houston Oilers	Al Lerderle	E	Georgia Tech
264	San Diego Chargers	Jacque MacKinnon	TE	Colgate

=== Round 34 ===
Pick #	AFL team	Player	Position	College
265	Oakland Raiders	Bill Worrell	OT	Georgia
266	Denver Broncos	Steve Stonebreaker	LB	Detroit
267	Dallas Texans	Roger Shoals	OT	Maryland
268	Buffalo Bills	Ben Charles	QB	USC
269	New York Titans	Dick Wilson	C	Penn State
270	Boston Patriots	Ray Lardani	OT	Miami (FL)
271	Houston Oilers	Don Talbert	OT	Texas
272	San Diego Chargers	Phil Lohman	C	Oklahoma

== Notable undrafted players ==
^{†}	= Pro Bowler

Original NFL team	Player	Pos.	College	Notes
Buffalo Bills	Booker Edgerson ^{†}	CB	Western Illinois	
Denver Broncos	Tom Erlandson ^{†}	CB	Washington State	
Houston Oilers	Charley Frazier ^{†}	WR	Texas Southern	
Oakland Raiders	Charlie Rieves	LB	Houston	
San Diego Chargers	Gerry McDougall	RB	UCLA	Former CFL All-Star

== Equalization Draft ==
Some of the picks from the equalization draft. In addition to those listed below, Denver chose two additional players and Dallas and Oakland each took one. New York and San Diego chose to protect players with all of their picks.

- Dallas drafted Sonny Bishop from San Diego
- Houston drafted Frank Gardner from San Diego
- Oakland drafted Jerry Richardson from San Diego
- Dallas drafted George Belotti from San Diego
- Denver drafted John Denvir from San Diego
- Denver drafted Charles Bolden from Houston
- Buffalo drafted Joe Fowlkes from Boston
- Boston drafted Claude King from Houston
- Denver drafted Richie Lucas from Buffalo

== See also ==
- List of American Football League players
- History of American Football League draft
- List of professional American football drafts

== Notes and references ==
References
