= Earl Gros =

American football player (1940–2013)

No. 40, 34, 38
- Position: Running back

Personal information
- Born: August 29, 1940; Lafourche Parish, Louisiana, U.S.
- Died: July 15, 2013 (aged 72); Prairieville, Louisiana, U.S.
- Listed height: 6 ft 3 in (1.91 m)
- Listed weight: 220 lb (100 kg)

Career information
- High school: Terrebonne (Houma, Louisiana)
- College: LSU
- NFL draft: 1962: 1st round, 14th overall pick
- AFL draft: 1962: 2nd round, 15th overall pick

Career history
- Green Bay Packers (1962–1963); Philadelphia Eagles (1964–1966); Pittsburgh Steelers (1967–1969); New Orleans Saints (1970)

Awards and highlights
- NFL champion (1962)

Career NFL statistics
- Rushing yards: 3,157
- Rushing average: 3.8
- Receptions: 142
- Receiving yards: 1,255
- Total touchdowns: 38
- Stats at Pro Football Reference

Earl Roy Gros (August 29, 1940 – July 15, 2013) was an American football running back who played in the National Football League (NFL) for nine seasons. Born and raised in Louisiana, he played college football at Louisiana State University (LSU) in Baton Rouge.

== Early life ==
Gros was born on August 29, 1940, in Lafourche Parish, Louisiana. He attended Terrebonne High School. Gros was a fullback on the football team. He was a standout in the 1958 Louisiana high school football All-Star Game. As a senior, the 195-pound (88.5 kg) Gros was named by the Associated Press (AP) second-team Triple-A All-State at running back. He was also a member of the track and field team, running the 180-yard low hurdles.

== College career ==
Gros attended Louisiana State University (LSU), and played on the varsity football team from 1959 to 1961, under head coach Paul Dietzel. He started his first game for LSU in September 1961, at fullback. As a senior in 1961, he had 90 rushing attempts for 406 yards and four touchdowns. During the regular season, Gros did not have one rush for a loss of yardage in his 90 attempts. His teammates included future NFL players Billy Truax, Roy Winston and Jerry Stovall, among others. The 1961 LSU Tigers had a 10–1 record, and were ranked No. 4 in the final Associated Press (AP) poll that year. They defeated Colorado in the Orange Bowl, 25–7. Gros played a valuable role rushing and blocking in the Orange Bowl victory, and led all runners with 55 yards in 10 carries.

In 1962, Gros received the Percy E. Roberts Award as LSU's Most Valuable Player. The 220-pound (99.8 kg) Gros was selected to play in the Senior Bowl. Gros played in the 1962 Chicago College All-Star Game against the Green Bay Packers, who had drafted him. Gros scored a touchdown against the Packers in the game on August 3, 1962.

== Professional career ==
Gros played two seasons with the Green Bay Packers (1962–63), three seasons with the Philadelphia Eagles (1964–1966), three with the Pittsburgh Steelers (1967–1969), and one game in 1970 with the New Orleans Saints.

=== Green Bay Packers ===
Gros was selected in the first round of the 1962 NFL draft by the Green Bay Packers (14th overall), and in the second round of the 1962 American Football League (AFL) Draft by the Houston Oilers (15th overall). LSU great and future NFL Hall of Fame fullback Jim Taylor of the Packers was courting Gros to join Green Bay, while former LSU Heisman Trophy winner Billy Cannon was pursuing Gros to join the Oilers. Gros opted for the NFL.

Before the 1962 season started, Gros, his wife Mickey and 10-month-old son Earl II had moved from Louisiana to Green Bay. When Mickey suffered a pancreatic ailment and had to be hospitalized for 10 days, Green Bay citizens volunteered to help watch baby Earl while Gros attended to his wife in the hospital. Gros was appreciative of this northern hospitality.

He was the backup fullback to Taylor in his 1962 rookie season, rushing for 155 yards on 29 carries with two touchdowns. Taylor led the NFL in rushing attempts, yards and touchdowns. The Packers had a 13–1 record, winning the West Division. The Packers then repeated as NFL champions in 1962. They had defeated the New York Giants 37–0 in the 1961 NFL Championship Game, and won the 1962 game 16–7, though Gros did not play in that game.

Gros again served as Taylor's backup in 1963. He had 203 yards in 48 attempts and two touchdowns. Before the start of the 1964 season, he was traded with Hall of Fame center Jim Ringo to the Philadelphia Eagles for linebacker Lee Roy Caffey (and a first round draft choice) in May 1964. The draft choice was used to select halfback Donny Anderson as a "future pick" in the 1965 NFL draft.

== Philadelphia Eagles ==
Gros's best season was in 1964 with the Eagles. He rushed for 748 yards on 152 attempts, averaging 4.9 yards per carry. He also had 29 receptions for 234 yards. His 4.9 yard average was fourth best in the NFL, behind only future Hall of Famers Jim Brown (often considered football's greatest player) and Taylor, and the Baltimore Colts' Tony Lorick. His 748 rushing yards were seventh best in the NFL.

While Gros started all 14 games for the Eagles in 1965, he also suffered injuries (including a painful hamstring). His yards per carry fell to 3.3, with 479 rushing yards on 145 carries; though he did score seven rushing touchdowns and catch 29 passes for 271 yards and two more touchdowns. He was tied for ninth in the NFL in total touchdowns. In an early December 1965 game against the Dallas Cowboys, Gros threw a 63-yard touchdown pass to Ray Poage on the Eagles first play from scrimmage. It was the only completed pass of four attempted in his career.

In 1966, Gros shared time at fullback with Tom Woodeshick and Israel ("Izzy") Lang. He rushed for 396 yards on 102 carries and again had seven rushing touchdowns. He had 18 receptions for 214 yards and two receiving touchdowns. He was again tied for ninth in the NFL in total touchdowns.

== Pittsburgh Steelers and New Orleans Saints ==
In March 1967, the Eagles traded Gros, guard Bruce Van Dyke and a 1967 third round draft pick to the Pittsburgh Steelers for receiver Gary Ballman. The Steelers used the draft pick on center Rockne Freitas. The Steelers had been the NFL's worst rushing team in 1966, and the trade was part of Coach Bill Austin's plan to remedy that situation. Austin had been one of Gros's coaches in Green Bay, and he considered Gros the best blocking fullback in the NFL.

Gros suffered a knee injury in 1967. He played in only 12 games for the Steelers, starting just seven. He had 252 yards in 72 rushing attempts with one touchdown. He also had 19 receptions for 175 yards. Gros came back in 1968 to start 13 games for the Steelers. He gained 579 rushing yards (second most in a season during his career) in 151 attempts. He had three rushing touchdowns. Gros also had 27 receptions for 211 yards and three receiving touchdowns. His six total touchdowns were second on the team to receiver Roy Jefferson's 11.

Gros started 11 games for the Steelers in 1969, gaining 343 yards on 116 carries, with four rushing touchdowns. He added 17 receptions for 131 yards and three receiving touchdowns. His seven total touchdowns were again second to Jefferson, who had nine. In early September 1970, the Steelers traded Gros to his home state New Orleans Saints for an undisclosed 1971 draft choice. He played in the Saints first game on September 20, 1970, with two yards in four attempts. The Saints waived Gros the next day, ending his NFL career.

He finished his career with 821 rushes for 3,157 yards (3.8 yards per carry) and 28 touchdowns; he also had 142 receptions for 1,255 yards (8.8 yards per reception) and ten touchdowns.

== NFL career statistics ==
Legend
	Won the NFL championship
**Bold**	Career high

Year	Team	Games		Rushing					Receiving				
Year	Team	GP	GS	Att	Yds	Avg	Lng	TD	Rec	Yds	Avg	Lng	TD
1962	GNB	14	0	29	155	**5.3**	26	2	0	0	0.0	0	0
1963	GNB	14	0	48	203	4.2	19	2	1	19	**19.0**	19	0
1964	PHI	13	12	**154**	**748**	4.9	**59**	2	**29**	234	8.1	29	0
1965	PHI	14	14	145	479	3.3	33	**7**	**29**	**271**	9.3	37	2
1966	PHI	14	6	102	396	3.9	26	**7**	18	214	11.9	**48**	2
1967	PIT	12	7	72	252	3.5	23	1	19	175	9.2	22	0
1968	PIT	13	13	151	579	3.8	44	3	27	211	7.8	21	**3**
1969	PIT	13	11	116	343	3.0	16	4	17	131	7.7	20	**3**
1970	NOR	1	0	4	2	0.5	4	0	2	0	0.0	0	0
		108	63	821	3,157	3.8	59	28	142	1,255	8.8	48	10

== Death ==
Gros died at age 72 in Schriever, Louisiana. He was predeceased by his wife June (Overton) Gros, and survived by his son Earl Roy Gros II and his mother Flora Trosclair Gros.
