= Neil Thomas =

Neil Thomas may refer to:

- Neil Thomas (Canadian football) (born c. 1940), Canadian football player
- Neil Thomas (gymnast) (born 1968), English Olympic gymnast
