= 1961 LSU Tigers football team =

American college football season

1961 LSU Tigers football
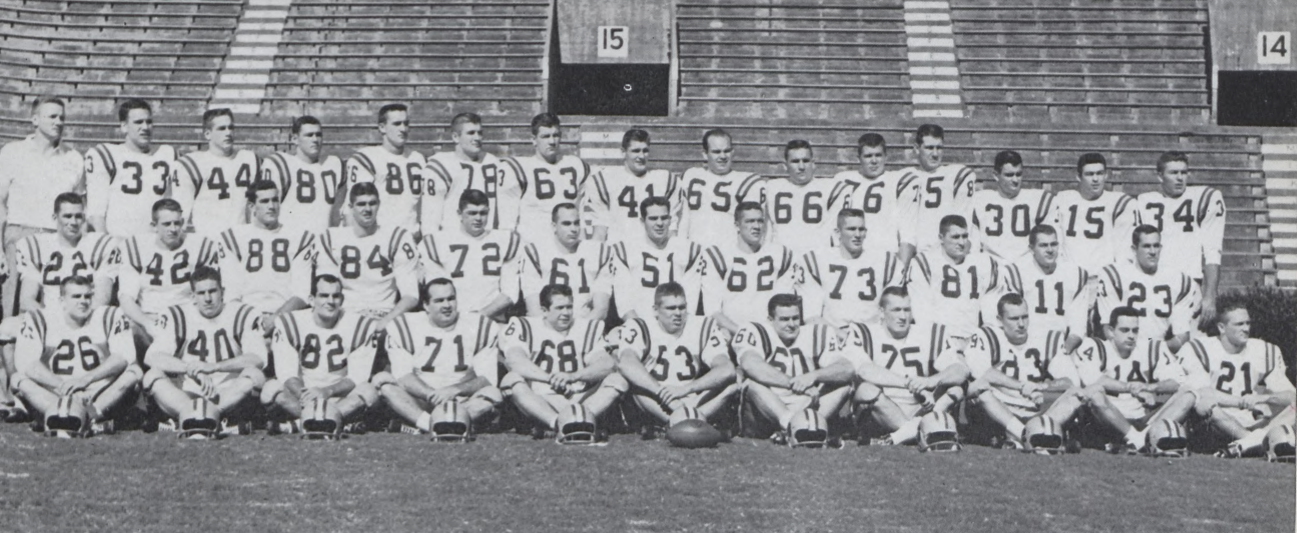
- Official team portrait from 1962 Gumbo

SEC co-champion Orange Bowl champion

Orange Bowl, W 25–7 vs. Colorado
- Conference: Southeastern Conference

Ranking
- Coaches: No. 3
- AP: No. 4
- Record: 10–1 (6–0 SEC)
- Head coach: Paul Dietzel (7th season)
- Captain: Roy Winston
- Home stadium: Tiger Stadium

1961 Southeastern Conference football standings
	Conf.					Overall
Team	W		L		T	W		L		T
No. 1 Alabama +	7	–	0	–	0	11	–	0	–	0
No. 4 LSU +	6	–	0	–	0	10	–	1	–	0
No. 5 Ole Miss	5	–	1	–	0	9	–	2	–	0
No. 13 Georgia Tech	4	–	3	–	0	7	–	4	–	0
Tennessee	4	–	3	–	0	6	–	4	–	0
Florida	3	–	3	–	0	4	–	5	–	1
Auburn	3	–	4	–	0	6	–	4	–	0
Kentucky	2	–	4	–	0	5	–	5	–	0
Georgia	2	–	5	–	0	3	–	7	–	0
Mississippi State	1	–	5	–	0	5	–	5	–	0
Tulane	1	–	5	–	0	2	–	8	–	0
Vanderbilt	1	–	6	–	0	2	–	8	–	0
+ – Conference co-champions; Rankings from AP Poll

The 1961 LSU Tigers football team was an American football team that represented Louisiana State University (LSU) as a member of the Southeastern Conference (SEC) during the 1961 college football season. In their seventh and final year under head coach Paul Dietzel, the Tigers compiled a 10–1 record (6–0 in conference games), tied with Alabama for the SEC championship, and were ranked No. 3 in the final UPI coaches poll and No. 4 in the final AP writers poll. After losing the season opener to Rice, The Tigers won 10 consecutive games, including a 10–0 victory over No. 3 Georgia Tech, a 10–7 victory over No. 2 Ole Miss, and a 25–7 victory over No. 7 Colorado in the 1962 Orange Bowl. They shut out five opponents, outscored all opponents by a total of 234 to 50, and ranked fourth nationally in both scoring defense (5.0 points per game) and rushing defense (79.4 yards per game).

LSU guard Roy Winston was a consensus first-team pick on the 1961 All-America football team. Other key players for LSU included halfback and College Football Hall of Fame inductee Jerry Stovall, fullback Wendell Harris, end Gene Sykes, tackle Billy Booth, and guard Monk Guillot.

From 1958 to 1961, Paul Dietzel led LSU to three bowl games, a national championship in 1958, and a 35–7–1 record. Four days after the 1962 Orange Bowl, Dietzel left LSU (with four of his assistant coaches) to become the head coach at Army. Top assistant Charles McClendon succeeded Dietzel as head coach.

LSU played its home games at Tiger Stadium in Baton Rouge, Louisiana.

== Schedule ==
Date	Time	Opponent	Rank	Site	TV	Result	Attendance	Source
September 23		at Rice*	No. 5	Rice Stadium; Houston, TX		L 16–3	73,000	
September 30	8:00 p.m.	Texas A&M*		Tiger Stadium; Baton Rouge, LA (rivalry)		W 16–7	64,000	
October 7	8:00 p.m.	No. 3 Georgia Tech		Tiger Stadium; Baton Rouge, LA		W 10–0	68,000	
October 14		at South Carolina*		Carolina Stadium; Columbia, SC		W 42–0	28,000	
October 21	8:00 p.m.	Kentucky^{†}	No. 10	Tiger Stadium; Baton Rouge, LA		W 24–14	66,000	
October 28		at Florida	No. 7	Florida Field; Gainesville, FL (rivalry)		W 23–0	46,000	
November 4	8:00 p.m.	No. 2 Ole Miss	No. 6	Tiger Stadium; Baton Rouge, LA (rivalry)		W 10–7	68,000	
November 11		at North Carolina*	No. 4	Kenan Memorial Stadium; Chapel Hill, NC		W 30–0	28,000	
November 18	8:00 p.m.	Mississippi State	No. 4	Tiger Stadium; Baton Rouge, LA (rivalry)		W 14–6	58,000	
November 25	8:00 p.m.	Tulane	No. 4	Tiger Stadium; Baton Rouge, LA (Battle for the Rag)		W 62–0	63,500	
January 1, 1962	12:30 p.m.	vs. No. 7 Colorado*	No. 4	Miami Orange Bowl; Miami, FL (Orange Bowl)	ABC	W 25–7	62,391	
*Non-conference game; ^{†}Homecoming; Rankings from AP Poll released prior to the game

== Statistics ==
During its 10-game regular season, LSU tallied 2,196 rushing yards (219.6 yard per game) and 704 passing yards. The Tigers ran 516 rushing plays for an average gain of 4.2 yards. On defense, they held opponents to 794 rushing yards (79.4 yards per game) and 909 passing yards. The team ranked fourth nationally in both scoring defense (5.0 points per game) and rushing defense (79.4 yards per game).

LSU's passing leaders during the regular season were Lynn Amedee (40-for-94, 485 yards, 2 touchdowns, 5 interceptions, 80.5 quarterback rating) and Jimmy Field (12-for 25, 239 yards, 2 touchdowns 1 interception, 146.7 quarterback rating).

The team's leading rushers during the regular season were Earl Gros (406 yards, 90 carries, 4.5-yard average); Jerry Stovall (405 yards, 65 carries, 6.2-yard average); Bo Campbell (319 yards, 48 carries, 6.6-yard average); Ray Wilkins (264 yards, 66 carries, 4.0-yard average); Wendell Harris (241 yards, 65 carries, 3.7-yard average); Jimmy Field (199 yards, 53 carries, 3.7-yard average); and Charles Cranford (156 yards, 48 carries, 3.2-yard average).

The leading receivers were Wendell Harris (10 receptions, 177 yards, 17.7-yard average, two touchdowns), Jerry Stovall (9 receptions, 135 yards, 14.0-yard average, 0 touchdowns); Charles Cranford (7 receptions, 101 yards, 14.4-yard average, 0 touchdowns); and Ray Wilkins (9 receptions, 72 yards, 8.0-yard average.

Wendell Harris led the team, and ranked fourth in the nation, in scoring with 94 points on eight touchdowns, six-of-nine on field goals, 26-of-29 on extra points, and a two-point conversion run. Two players (Campbell and Gros) tied for second place in scoring with 24 points each.

Punting was handled by Jerry Stovall (51 punts, 37.8-yard average) and Danny Neumann (10 punds, 43.6-yard average).

== Awards and honors ==
LSU guard Roy Winston was a consensus first-team pick on the 1961 All-America college football team. He received first-team honors from the American Football Coaches Association, Associated Press (AP), United Press International (UPI), and Football Writers Association of America, among others.

Seven LSU players received recognition from the AP or UPI on the 1961 All-SEC football team: guard Roy Winston (AP-1, UPI-1); halfback Jerry Stovall (AP-2, UPI-1); fullback Wendell Harris (AP-1, UPI-2); tackle Billy Booth (AP-2, UPI-3); guard Monk Guillot (AP-2); fullback Earl Gros (AP-3); and end Gene Sykes (AP-3).

Jerry Stovall was inducted into the College Football Hall of Fame in 2010.

== Personnel ==
=== Players ===
- Lynn Amedee, quarterback, junior, 175 pounds
- Billy Booth, tackle, senior, 225 pounds
- Edward Campbell
- Charles Cranford, fullback
- Don Estes, tackle, junior, 225 pounds
- Jimmy Field, quarterback
- Bob Flurry, end, 200 pounds
- Dexter Gary, guard, 204 pounds
- Jack Gates, end, junior, 198 pounds
- Dennis Gaubatz (#53), center, junior, 209 pounds
- Earl Gros, fullback, senior, 215 pounds
- Monk Guillot, guard, senior, 200 pounds
- Edward Habert, guard, 196 pounds
- Buddy Hamic, fullback
- Dan Hargett, guard
- Wendell Harris, fullback, senior, 197 pounds
- Robbie Hucklebridge, guard
- Gary Kinchen, center
- John Mercer
- Fred Miller, tackle, 227 pounds
- Mike Morgan, end
- Tommy Neck (#34), halfback, senior, 187 pounds
- Danny Neumann, end, 192 pounds
- Sammy Odom, guard
- Ralph Pere, tackle, 200 pounds
- Dwight Robinson, quarterback
- Bob Richards, tackle
- Buddy Soefker, halfback
- Jerry Stovall, halfback, junior, 193 pounds
- Gene Sykes, end, junior, 185 pounds
- Billy Truax, end
- Steve Ward, fullback/linebacker, junior
- Ray Wilkins, halfback
- Roy Winston, guard and captain, senior, 224 pounds
- Jerry Young, end

=== Coaches and administrators ===
- Head coach: Paul Dietzel
- Assistant coaches: Charles McClendon, George Terry, Larry Jones, Charles Pevey, and Bill Shalosky
- Athletic director: Jim Corbett

=== Gallery ===
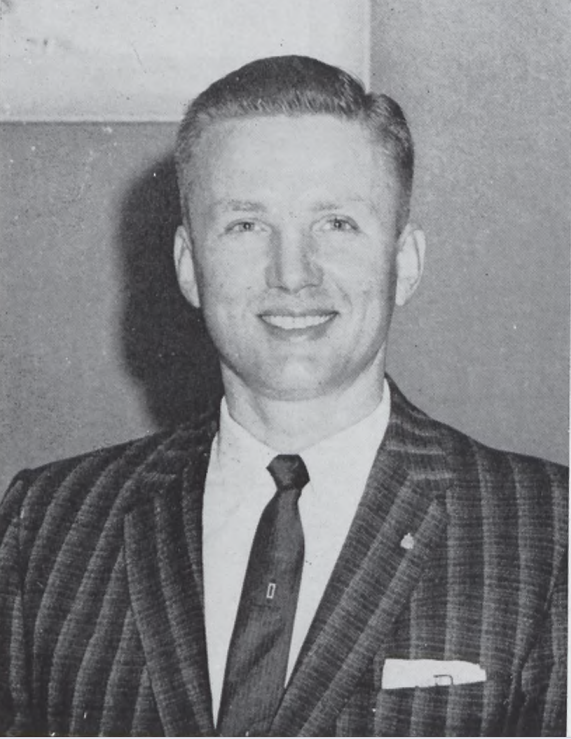
Paul Dietzel, head coach

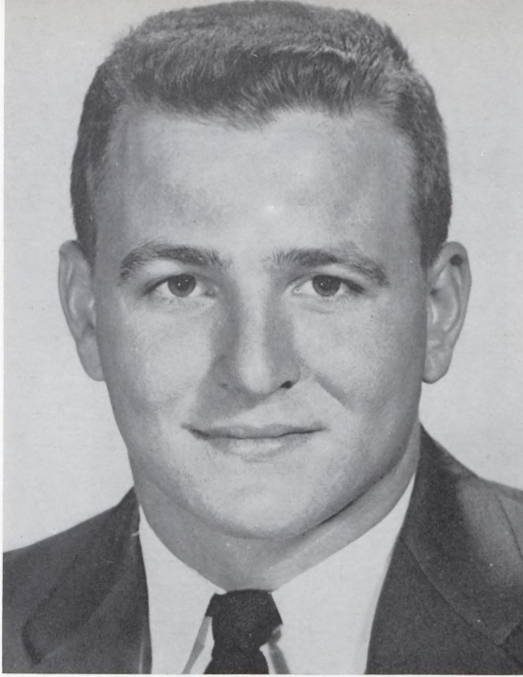
Roy Winston, guard

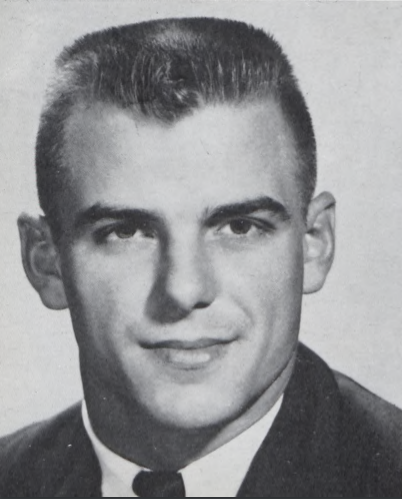
Wendell Harris, fullback

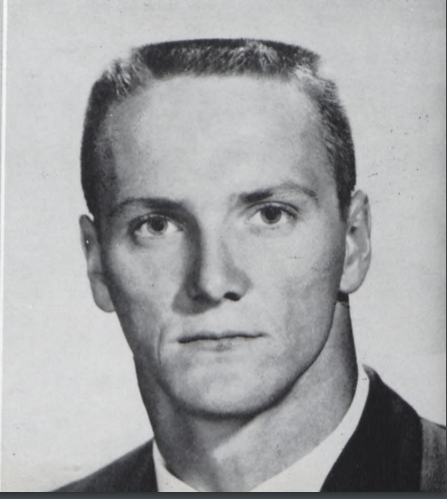
Jerry Stovall, halfback

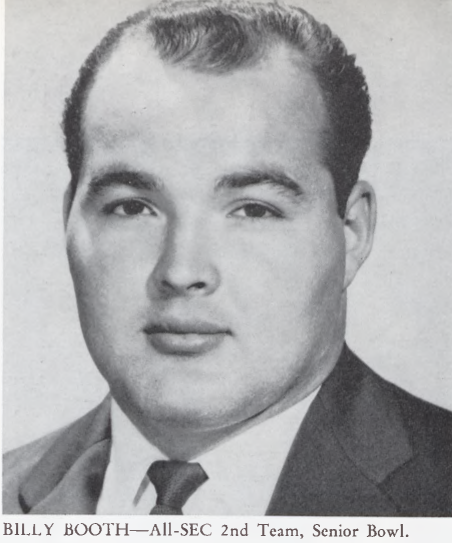
Billy Booth, tackle

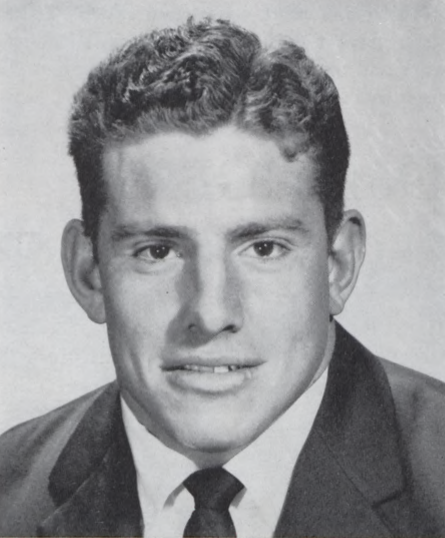
Earl Gros, fullback

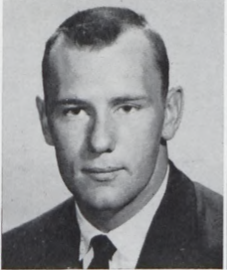
Gene Sykes, end
