= Gary Henson =

American football player (1940–2015)

No. 80, 89
- Position: End

Personal information
- Born: September 8, 1940; Oklahoma City, Oklahoma, U.S.
- Died: January 20, 2015 (aged 74)
- Listed height: 6 ft 3 in (1.91 m)
- Listed weight: 200 lb (91 kg)

Career information
- High school: East (Denver, Colorado)
- College: Colorado (1959–1960)
- NFL draft: 1962: 14th round, 184th overall pick
- AFL draft: 1962: 28th round, 223rd overall pick

Career history
- Philadelphia Eagles (1963); Denver Broncos (1964)

Career NFL statistics
- Games played: 12
- Fumble recoveries: 1
- Return yards: 21
- Stats at Pro Football Reference

Gary Owen Henson (September 8, 1940 – January 20, 2015) was an American professional football player who was an end for the Philadelphia Eagles of the National Football League (NFL) and the Denver Broncos of the American Football League (AFL). He played college football for the Colorado Buffaloes.

== College career ==
Henson played college football for the Colorado Buffaloes from 1959 to 1960. In 1959, he played in 10 games, recording 11 receptions for 201 yards and two touchdowns. The following year, Henson caught eight passes for 206 yards and another two touchdowns.

== Professional career ==
Henson was selected by the Los Angeles Rams in the 14th round as the 184th overall pick in the 1962 NFL draft and the Houston Oilers in the 28th round as the 223rd pick in the 1962 AFL draft.

=== Philadelphia Eagles ===
In 1963, Henson signed with the Philadelphia Eagles of the National Football League (NFL). He played in 11 games where he returned three kickoffs for 21 yards. Henson also recovered a fumble.

=== Denver Broncos ===
In 1964, Henson signed with the Denver Broncos of the American Football League (AFL). He appeared in one game against the Oakland Raiders, but recorded no statistics.
