= 1961 Ole Miss Rebels football team =

American college football season

1961 Ole Miss Rebels football

Cotton Bowl Classic, L 7–12 vs. Texas
- Conference: Southeastern Conference

Ranking
- Coaches: No. 5
- AP: No. 5
- Record: 9–2 (5–1 SEC)
- Head coach: Johnny Vaught (15th season)
- Home stadium: Hemingway Stadium; Mississippi Veterans Memorial Stadium

1961 Southeastern Conference football standings
	Conf.					Overall
Team	W		L		T	W		L		T
No. 1 Alabama +	7	–	0	–	0	11	–	0	–	0
No. 4 LSU +	6	–	0	–	0	10	–	1	–	0
No. 5 Ole Miss	5	–	1	–	0	9	–	2	–	0
No. 13 Georgia Tech	4	–	3	–	0	7	–	4	–	0
Tennessee	4	–	3	–	0	6	–	4	–	0
Florida	3	–	3	–	0	4	–	5	–	1
Auburn	3	–	4	–	0	6	–	4	–	0
Kentucky	2	–	4	–	0	5	–	5	–	0
Georgia	2	–	5	–	0	3	–	7	–	0
Mississippi State	1	–	5	–	0	5	–	5	–	0
Tulane	1	–	5	–	0	2	–	8	–	0
Vanderbilt	1	–	6	–	0	2	–	8	–	0
+ – Conference co-champions; Rankings from AP Poll

The 1961 Ole Miss Rebels football team was an American football team that represented the University of Mississippi (Ole Miss) as a member of the Southeastern Conference (SEC) during the 1961 college football season. In their 15th year under head coach Johnny Vaught, the Rebels compiled a 9–2 record (5–1 in conference games), finished third in the SEC, shut out five opponents, and outscored all opponents by a total of 326 to 40. The Rebels finished the season ranked No. 5 in both the AP writers poll and UPI coaches poll and lost to No. 3 Texas, 12–7, in the 1962 Cotton Bowl. Having won national championships in 1959 and 1960, Ole Miss was favored in every game throughout the 1961 season.

The team scored an average of 29.6 points and gained an average of 487.1 yards of total offense per game. On defense, they held opponents to 3.6 points and 161.4 yards per game. Fullback Billy Ray Adams led the team in rushing (575 yards) and was a first-team pick on the 1961 All-America college football team. Quarterback Doug Elmore led the team in total offense (1,086 yards) and was selected as a first-team All-American by the Central Press.

The team played its home games at Hemingway Stadium in Oxford, Mississippi.

== Schedule ==
Date	Opponent	Rank	Site	Result	Attendance	Source
September 23	Arkansas*	No. 9	Mississippi Veterans Memorial Stadium; Jackson, MS (rivalry)	W 16–0	46,000	
September 30	at Kentucky	No. 2	McLean Stadium; Lexington, KY	W 20–6	33,000	
October 7	Florida State*	No. 2	Hemingway Stadium; Oxford, MS	W 33–0	12,000	
October 14	vs. Houston*	No. 1	Crump Stadium; Memphis, TN	W 47–7	15,610	
October 21	Tulane	No. 2	Memorial Stadium; Jackson, MS (rivalry)	W 41–0	40,000	
October 28	at Vanderbilt	No. 2	Dudley Field; Nashville, TN (rivalry)	W 47–0	25,000	
November 4	at No. 6 LSU	No. 2	Tiger Stadium; Baton Rouge, LA (rivalry)	L 7–10	68,000	
November 11	Chattanooga*	No. 7	Hemingway Stadium; Oxford, MS	W 54–0	10,000	
November 18	vs. Tennessee	No. 6	Crump Stadium; Memphis, TN (rivalry)	W 24–10	32,428	
December 2	at Mississippi State	No. 5	Scott Field; Starkville, MS (Egg Bowl)	W 37–7	34,500	
January 1	vs. No. 3 Texas*	No. 5	Cotton Bowl; Dallas, TX (Cotton Bowl Classic)	L 7–12	75,000	
*Non-conference game; Rankings from AP Poll released prior to the game

== Statistics ==
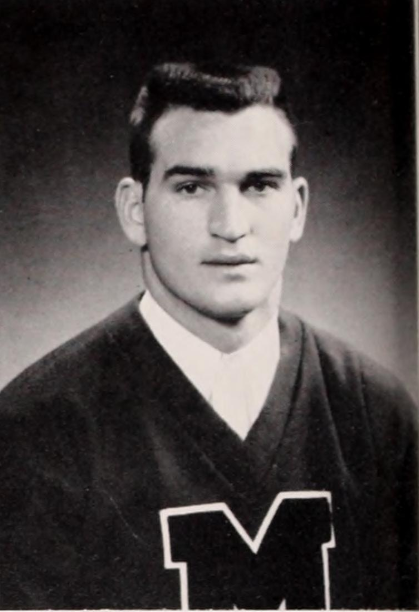
Quarterback Doug Elmore

The Rebels averaged 262.8 rushing yards and 224.3 passing yards per game. On defense, they gave up an average of only 89.3 rushing yards and 72.1 passing yards per game.

The Rebels had three quarterbacks who had quarterback ratings over 147:

- Glynn Griffing completed 46 of 91 passes (50.5%) for 785 yards with 10 touchdown passes, two interceptions and a 154.9 quarterback rating.
- Doug Elmore completed 50 of 84 passes (59.5%) for 741 yards with six touchdowns, four interceptions, and a 147.7 quarterback rating. Elmore also tallied 345 rushing yards for a team-high total of 1,086 yard of total offense.
- Perry Lee Dunn completed 13 of 27 passes (48.1%) for 301 yards with three touchdowns, two interceptions, and a 163.6 quarterback rating.

The Rebels also had ten backs who tallied at least 99 rushing yards. They were led by Billy Ray Adams (575 yards, 91 carries, 6.3 yards per carry), Doug Elmore (345 yards, 77 carries, 4.5 yards per carry), Buck Randall (200 yards, 48 carries, 4.2 yards per carry), Art Doty (182 yards, 35 carries, 5.2 yards per carry), and Perry Lee Dunn (175 yards, 39 carries, 4.5 yards per carry).

The team also had ten players with at least 100 receiving yards. The group was led by Catfish Smith (14 receptions, 254 yards), Billy Ray Adams (11 receptions 198 yards), Wesley Sullivan (nine receptions, 163 yards), Willis Dabbs (seven receptions, 155 yards), and A.J. Holloway (14 receptions, 148 yards).

Billy Ray Adams led the team in scoring with 54 points on nine touchdowns.

== Awards and honors ==
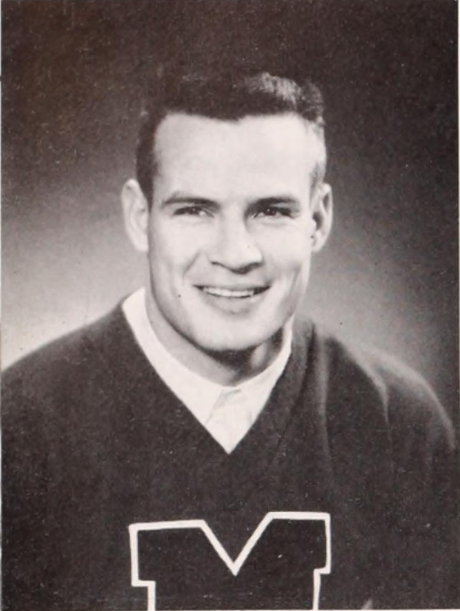
Fullback Billy Ray Adams

Four Ole Miss players were recognized on the 1961 All-America college football team:

- Fullback Billy Ray Adams was named to the first-team by the Football Writers Association of America (FWAA), to the second-team by the Associated Press (AP) and to the third team by the United Press International (UPI).
- Quarterback Doug Elmore was named to the first team by the Central Press.
- Guard Bookie Bolin was named to the first team by Time magazine.
- Tackle Jim Dunaway was named to the second team by the UPI.

Six players were honored on the 1961 All-SEC football team: fullback Billy Ray Adams (AP-1 [halfback], UPI-1 [halfback]); tackle Jim Dunaway (AP-1, UPI-1); end Ralph Smith (AP-2, UPI-2); quarterback Doug Elmore (AP-2, UPI-2); guard Bookie Bolin (UPI-2); and guard Billy Ray Jones (AP-3, UPI-3).

== Personnel ==
=== Players ===
- Billy Ray Adams, fullback, 210 pounds
- Bookie Bolin, guard, 222 pounds
- Jerry Brown, tackle, 226 pounds
- Woody Dabbs, end, 200 pounds
- Art Doty, halfback, 185 pounds
- Jim Dunaway, tackle, 250 pounds
- Doug Elmore, quarterback, 187 pounds
- Glynn Griffing, quarterback
- Louis Guy, halfback, 181 pounds
- Whaley Hall, tackle
- Billy Ray Jones, guard, 212 pounds
- Walt Kinnebrew, halfback
- Fred Lentjes, center, senior, 212 pounds
- Sam Owen, guard
- Richard Ross, center
- Ralph Smith, end, 200 pounds

=== Coaches and administrators ===
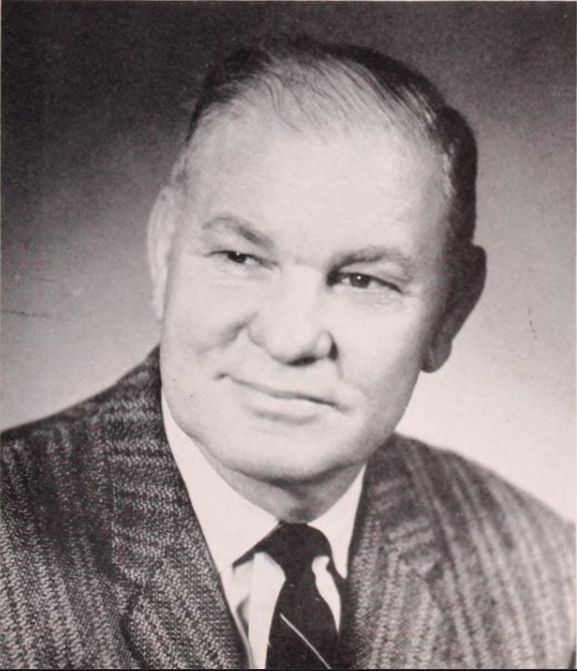
Johnny Vaught

- Head coach: Johnny Vaught
- Assistant coaches: Wes "Doc" Knight, Johnny Cain, Junie Hovious, Bruiser Kinard, J. W. "Wobble" Davidson, Ray Poole, Tom Swayze, Roland Dale, Buster Poole, B. L. Graham
- Athletic director: Tad Smith
