= Jim Thibert =

American football linebacker

Jim Thilbert

No. 57, 63
- Position: Linebacker

Personal information
- Born: June 14, 1940 (age 86); Toledo, Ohio, U.S.

Career information
- High school: Central Catholic
- College: Toledo (1959–1962)

Career history
- Edmonton Eskimos (1964); Green Bay Packers (1964–1965)*; Denver Broncos (1965)
- * Offseason or practice squad member only
- Stats at Pro Football Reference

James Gerald Thibert (born June 14, 1940) is an American professional football linebacker. He played for the Edmonton Eskimos of the Canadian Football League (CFL), and played for the Denver Broncos of the American Football League (AFL).

== Life and career ==
Thibert was born in Toledo, Ohio. He played high school football as a right end at Central Catholic High School. He then enrolled at the University of Toledo to play college football for the Toledo Rockets. He was on the freshman team in 1959, and was a three-year varsity letterman from 1960 to 1962.

In December 1961, Thibert was selected by the San Diego Chargers of the American Football League (AFL) in the 22nd round of the 1962 AFL draft, and he joined the team in May 1963. He was later released from the team, and in 1964, he joined the Edmonton Eskimos of the Canadian Football League (CFL). He played in two games during the 1964 CFL season, and in December 1964, he joined the Green Bay Packers of the National Football League (NFL). He was released from the team on September 7, 1965, and on September 18, 1965, he joined the Denver Broncos. He played in thirteen games during the 1965 AFL season, but was released from the team in August 1966.
