= Gary Schwertfeger =

American gridiron football player (born 1940)

Profile
- Positions: Centre, Linebacker

Personal information
- Born: July 24, 1940 (age 86); Milwaukee, Wisconsin, U.S.
- Listed height: 6 ft 4 in (1.93 m)
- Listed weight: 225 lb (102 kg)

Career information
- College: Montana
- AFL draft: 1962: 12th round, 92nd overall pick

Career history
- 1962–1965: BC Lions

Awards and highlights
- Grey Cup champion (1964)

Gary Schwertfeger (born July 24, 1940) is an American former professional football player who played for the BC Lions. He won the Grey Cup with them in 1964. He played college football at the University of Montana.
