= Gary Cutsinger =

American football player (1940–2026)

No. 80
- Position: Defensive end

Personal information
- Born: February 4, 1940; Perry, Oklahoma, U.S.
- Died: May 16, 2026 (aged 86)
- Listed height: 6 ft 5 in (1.96 m)
- Listed weight: 245 lb (111 kg)

Career information
- High school: Elk City (Elk City, Oklahoma)
- College: Oklahoma State
- NFL draft: 1962: 7th round, 98th overall pick
- AFL draft: 1962: 4th round, 30th overall pick

Career history
- Houston Oilers (1962–1968)

Career AFL statistics
- Fumble recoveries: 1
- Interceptions: 2
- Sacks: 23.5
- Stats at Pro Football Reference

Gary Leon Cutsinger (February 4, 1940 – May 16, 2026) was an American professional football player who was a defensive end for six seasons with the Houston Oilers of the American Football League (AFL). He played college football for the Oklahoma State Cowboys.

Cutsinger died on May 16, 2026, at the age of 86.
