= Billy Ray Adams =

American football player (1938–2023)

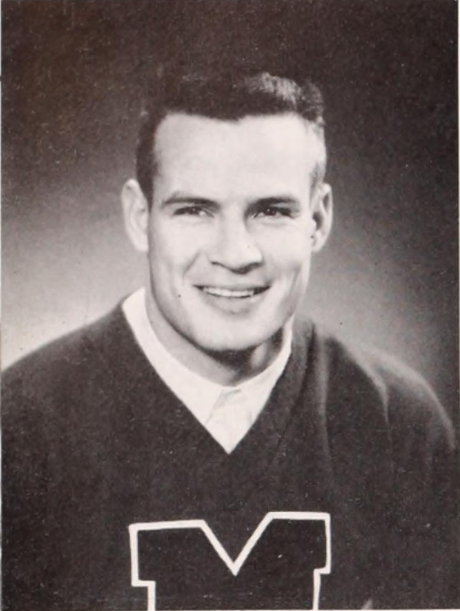

Personal information
- Born: October 18, 1938; Reform, Alabama, U.S.
- Died: June 1, 2023 (aged 84); Madison, Mississippi, U.S.

Career information
- College: Ole Miss (1959–1961)
- NFL draft: 1962: 3rd round, 36th overall pick
- AFL draft: 1962: 16th round, 127th overall pick

Career history
- San Francisco 49ers (1962)*
- * Offseason or practice squad member only

Awards and highlights
- First-team All-American (1961); First-team All-SEC (1961); Mississippi Sports Hall of Fame

Billy Ray Adams (October 18, 1938 – June 1, 2023) was an American college football player for the Ole Miss Rebels. He was named a first-team All-American as a senior in 1961.

Adams was born on October 18, 1938, in Reform, Alabama. He grew up in Columbus, Mississippi, where he graduated from Stephen D. Lee High School. He attended the University of Mississippi and played under coach Johnny Vaught on his Rebels teams from 1959 to 1961 as a left cornerback and fullback. Adams graduated in 1962. He was inducted into the Mississippi Sports Hall of Fame in 1987.

Adams died in Madison, Mississippi, on June 1, 2023, at the age of 84.

== See also ==
- 1961 College Football All-America Team
