= Pete Nicklas =

American football player (born 1939)

No. 70
- Position: Offensive tackle

Personal information
- Born: July 24, 1939 (age 87); Akron, Ohio, U.S.
- Listed height: 6 ft 4 in (1.93 m)
- Listed weight: 240 lb (109 kg)

Career information
- High school: Whittier (CA)
- College: Cerritos; Baylor
- NFL draft: 1961: 9th round, 119th overall pick
- AFL draft: 1962: 30th round, 233rd overall pick

Career history
- Oakland Raiders (1962); Buffalo Bills (1963)*
- * Offseason or practice squad member only

Career AFL statistics
- Games played: 14
- Games started: 1
- Stats at Pro Football Reference

Peter Lawrence Nicklas (born July 24, 1939) is an American former professional football player who was an offensive tackle for one season with the Oakland Raiders of the American Football League (AFL). He played college football for the Baylor Bears.

== Early life and education ==
Nicklas was born on July 24, 1939, in Akron, Ohio. He attended Whittier High School in California, graduating in 1957. He joined Cerritos Junior College following his graduation from high school, blocking a punt in the Junior College Rose Bowl. He was a "star player" for the school in 1958, being named first-team all-conference at the conclusion of the season. After playing the 1959 season with the team, Nicklas transferred to Baylor University.

A 1960 profile in the Austin American-Statesman called Nicklas a player who, "turns in occasional big plays but needs to be consistent." He suffered a broken nose in mid-December which caused him to miss the end of the season. A 1961 article in The Waco News-Tribune wrote, "The Bruin situation is similar to that of the Longhorns: to be a standout contender they need a top-flight first-team tackle combination. The key name probably is Pete Nicklas, who has been erratic at times but also has shown the ability to make the big play. If Nicklas can have a banner year the Bruin front line might be very good, indeed."

== Professional career ==
Though he was selected in the 9th round (119th overall) of the 1961 NFL draft by the Baltimore Colts, he did not play with them and continued his education. After graduating from Baylor in 1962, he was the 233rd selection in the 1962 AFL draft by the Oakland Raiders. He officially signed with the team on February 26, 1962. He was the team's backup tackle, and could play on either the right side or left side of the line. He also was occasionally used on defense. Overall, in the 1962 season, he appeared in all fourteen games, and started one. The Raiders finished the season 1–13, and he was traded to the Buffalo Bills in June 1963. He was waived at roster cuts, ending his professional career.
