= 1961 Gator Bowl =

American college football game

Penn State Nittany Lions	Georgia Tech Yellow Jackets
(7–3)	(7–3)
Independent	SEC
30	15
Head coach: Rip Engle	Head coach: Bobby Dodd
AP / Coaches; NR / 19	AP / Coaches; 13 / 13
	1	2	3	4	Total
Penn State	0	14	6	10	30
Georgia Tech	2	7	0	6	15
- Date: December 30, 1961
- Season: 1961
- MVP: QB Galen Hall (Penn State); HB Joe Auer (Georgia Tech)
- Referee: James Artley (SEC; split crew: SEC, EIFA)

United States TV coverage
- Network: CBS

The 1961 Gator Bowl was an American college football bowl game played on December 30, 1961, at Gator Bowl Stadium in Jacksonville, Florida. The game pitted the Penn State Nittany Lions and the Georgia Tech Yellow Jackets.

== Background ==
Penn State started the season ranked #7, though a loss to Miami early in the season dropped them out. Penn state had a three-game winning streak going into this bowl game, which was their third straight bowl appearance.

The Yellow Jackets managed to have a winning season for the first time in two years, with highlights being a win over #7 ranked Rice and a four-game winning streak in the middle season, with losses to LSU, Tennessee, and Alabama compounding their season. This was the third straight bowl appearance in the Gator Bowl.

== Game summary ==
- Georgia Tech - Safety
- Georgia Tech - Joe Auer, 68 yard touchdown run (Billy Lothridge kick)
- Penn State - Al Gursky, 13 yard touchdown pass from Galen Hall (Don Jonas kick)
- Penn State - Roger Kochman, 27 yard touchdownpass from Hall (Jonas kick)
- Penn State - Hal Powell, 35 yard touchdown pass from Hall (kick failed)
- Georgia Tech - Auer, 14 yard touchdown run (run failed)
- Penn State - Jonas, 23 yard field goal
- Penn State - Buddy Torris, 1 yard touchdown run (Jonas kick)

For Penn State, Galen Hall threw 12-of-22 for 175 yards and three touchdowns in an MVP effort. Joe Auer rushed for 98 yards on 10 carries for Georgia Tech in an MVP effort. Georgia Tech outrushed and outpassed Penn State (211 to 138 and 201 to 175, respectively), but the Yellow Jackets turned the ball over five times, while the Nittany Lions only turned it over once.

== Aftermath ==
The Nittany Lions went to three more bowl games in the decade, two of them being Gator Bowls. Georgia Tech went to three more bowl games in the decade (the latter being Dodd's last game as coach), with one being a Gator Bowl.
