= Jim Perkins (American football) =

American football player (1939–1992)

- Perkins, circa 1957

No. 71
- Position: Offensive tackle

Personal information
- Born: June 16, 1939; Loyalton, California, U.S.
- Died: July 24, 1992 (aged 53); Roseville, California, U.S.
- Listed height: 6 ft 2 in (1.88 m)
- Listed weight: 250 lb (113 kg)

Career information
- High school: Loyalton
- College: Colorado
- AFL draft: 1962: 21st round, 162nd overall pick

Career history
- Denver Broncos (1962–1964)
- Stats at Pro Football Reference

James William Perkins (June 16, 1939 – July 24, 1992) was an American professional football offensive tackle who played for the Denver Broncos of the American Football League (AFL). He played college football for the Colorado Buffaloes and was selected by the Broncos in the 21st round of the 1962 AFL draft.

== Early life ==
James William Perkins was born on June 16, 1939, in Loyalton, California. He played high school football at Loyalton High School and was a four-year varsity letterman. He reportedly earned the most letters in school history. Perkins graduated in 1957. He spent the summer of 1957 working for the forest service.

== College career ==
Perkins accepted a full-ride athletic scholarship to attend the University of Colorado and play college football for the Buffaloes. He sat out the 1957 season as a freshman. He was on the varsity team in 1958 but did not earn a letter. Perkins was a three-year varsity letterman from 1959 to 1961.

== Professional career ==
Perkins was selected by the Philadelphia Eagles in the seventh round, with the 86th overall pick, of the 1962 NFL draft and by the Denver Broncos in the 21st round, with the 162nd overall pick, of the 1962 AFL draft. He chose to sign with the Broncos. He played in all 42 games, starting 30, at offensive tackle for Denver from 1962 to 1964. Perkins was released on August 23, 1965.

== Personal life ==
Perkins served in the United States Army. On July 24, 1992, in Roseville, California, he died of a heart attack while working out.
