= Reed Bohovich =

American football player (1941–2011)

No. 73
- Positions: Guard, Tackle

Personal information
- Born: November 18, 1941; Buffalo, New York, U.S.
- Died: October 1, 2011 (aged 69); Richmond, Texas, U.S.
- Listed height: 6 ft 1 in (1.85 m)
- Listed weight: 260 lb (118 kg)

Career information
- High school: Tonawanda (NY) St. Joseph's
- College: Lehigh
- NFL draft: 1962: 9th round, 125th overall pick
- AFL draft: 1962: 19th round, 149th overall pick

Career history
- New York Giants (1962); Cleveland Browns (1963)*
- * Offseason or practice squad member only

Career NFL statistics
- Games played: 10
- Games started: 8
- Stats at Pro Football Reference

George Reed Bohovich (November 28, 1941 – October 1, 2011) was an American professional football guard. He played for the New York Giants in 1962.
