= 1961 Tulane Green Wave football team =

American college football season

1961 Tulane Green Wave football
- Conference: Southeastern Conference
- Record: 2–8 (1–5 SEC)
- Head coach: Andy Pilney (8th season)
- Home stadium: Tulane Stadium

1961 Southeastern Conference football standings
	Conf.					Overall
Team	W		L		T	W		L		T
No. 1 Alabama +	7	–	0	–	0	11	–	0	–	0
No. 4 LSU +	6	–	0	–	0	10	–	1	–	0
No. 5 Ole Miss	5	–	1	–	0	9	–	2	–	0
No. 13 Georgia Tech	4	–	3	–	0	7	–	4	–	0
Tennessee	4	–	3	–	0	6	–	4	–	0
Florida	3	–	3	–	0	4	–	5	–	1
Auburn	3	–	4	–	0	6	–	4	–	0
Kentucky	2	–	4	–	0	5	–	5	–	0
Georgia	2	–	5	–	0	3	–	7	–	0
Mississippi State	1	–	5	–	0	5	–	5	–	0
Tulane	1	–	5	–	0	2	–	8	–	0
Vanderbilt	1	–	6	–	0	2	–	8	–	0
+ – Conference co-champions; Rankings from AP Poll

The 1961 Tulane Green Wave football team was an American football team that represented Tulane University during the 1961 college football season as a member of the Southeastern Conference (SEC). In its eighth year under head coach Andy Pilney, the team compiled a 2–8 record (1–5 in conference games), finished 11th in conference games, and was outscored by a total of 225 to 60.

The team gained an average of 97.7 rushing yards and 60.6 passing yards per game. On defense, it gave up an average of 188.7 rushing yards and 91.1 passing yards per game. Tulane's individual leaders included Jack Dominique with 338 passing yards, Gordon Rush with 191 rushing yards, and Thomas Emerson with 116 receiving yards.

The Green Wave played its home games at Tulane Stadium in New Orleans.

== Schedule ==
Date	Opponent	Site	Result	Attendance	Source
September 23	at Stanford*	Stanford Stadium; Stanford, CA	L 7–9	19,000	
September 30	at No. 4 Alabama	Ladd Memorial Stadium; Mobile, AL	L 0–9	33,000	
October 6	Florida	Tulane Stadium; New Orleans, LA	L 3–14	30,000	
October 14	Virginia Tech*	Tulane Stadium; New Orleans, LA	W 27–14		
October 21	at No. 2 Ole Miss	Mississippi Veterans Memorial Stadium; Jackson, MS (rivalry)	L 0–41	40,000	
October 28	No. 9 Georgia Tech^{†}	Tulane Stadium; New Orleans, LA	L 0–35	22,000	
November 4	at Clemson*	Memorial Stadium; Clemson, SC	L 6–21	25,000	
November 11	Miami (FL)*	Tulane Stadium; New Orleans, LA	L 0–6	15,000	
November 17	Vanderbilt	Tulane Stadium; New Orleans, LA	W 17–14	15,000	
November 25	at No. 4 LSU	Tiger Stadium; Baton Rouge, LA (Battle for the Rag)	L 0–62	63,500	
*Non-conference game; ^{†}Homecoming; Rankings from AP Poll released prior to the game
