= 1961 Florida Gators football team =

American college football season

1961 Florida Gators football
- Conference: Southeastern Conference
- Record: 4–5–1 (3–3 SEC)
- Head coach: Ray Graves (2nd season)
- Captain: Jim Beaver
- Home stadium: Florida Field

1961 Southeastern Conference football standings
	Conf.					Overall
Team	W		L		T	W		L		T
No. 1 Alabama +	7	–	0	–	0	11	–	0	–	0
No. 4 LSU +	6	–	0	–	0	10	–	1	–	0
No. 5 Ole Miss	5	–	1	–	0	9	–	2	–	0
No. 13 Georgia Tech	4	–	3	–	0	7	–	4	–	0
Tennessee	4	–	3	–	0	6	–	4	–	0
Florida	3	–	3	–	0	4	–	5	–	1
Auburn	3	–	4	–	0	6	–	4	–	0
Kentucky	2	–	4	–	0	5	–	5	–	0
Georgia	2	–	5	–	0	3	–	7	–	0
Mississippi State	1	–	5	–	0	5	–	5	–	0
Tulane	1	–	5	–	0	2	–	8	–	0
Vanderbilt	1	–	6	–	0	2	–	8	–	0
+ – Conference co-champions; Rankings from AP Poll

The 1961 Florida Gators football team was an American football team that represented the University of Florida as a member of the Southeastern Conference (SEC) during the 1961 college football season. In their second year under head coach Ray Graves, the Gators compiled a 4–5–1 record (3–3 in conference games), finished in sixth place in the SEC, and outscored opponents by a total of 146 to 97.

The Gators attempted LSU coach Paul Dietzel's three-platoon system.

The team's statistical leaders included Tom Batten (460 passing yards), Don Goodman (455 rushing yards), and Larry Libertore (671 yards total offense). Other notable players included Lindy Infante (369 rushing yards).

The team played its home games at Florida Field in Gainesville, Florida.

== Schedule ==
Date	Opponent	Site	Result	Attendance	Source
September 23	Clemson*	Florida Field; Gainesville, FL	W 21–7	42,000	
September 30	Florida State*	Florida Field; Gainesville, FL (rivalry)	T 3–3	46,000	
October 6	at Tulane	Tulane Stadium; New Orleans, LA	W 14–3	30,000	
October 14	at Rice*	Rice Stadium; Houston, TX	L 10–19	32,000	
October 21	at Vanderbilt	Dudley Field; Nashville, TN	W 7–0	18,000	
October 28	No. 7 LSU^{†}	Florida Field; Gainesville, FL (rivalry)	L 0–23	46,000	
November 4	at No. 7 Georgia Tech	Grant Field; Atlanta, GA	L 0–20	44,940	
November 11	vs. Georgia	Gator Bowl Stadium; Jacksonville, FL (rivalry)	W 21–14	47,000	
November 25	at Auburn	Cliff Hare Stadium; Auburn, AL (rivalry)	L 15–32	33,000	
December 2	Miami (FL)*	Florida Field; Gainesville, FL (rivalry)	L 6–15	42,000	
*Non-conference game; ^{†}Homecoming; Rankings from AP Poll released prior to the game

== Statistics ==
The Gators gained an average of 142.2 rushing yards and 101.7 passing yards per game. On defense, they gave up 144.9 rushing yards and 82.0 passing yards per game.

Quarterback Larry Libertore, who weighed only 138 pounds, led the team with 671 yards of total offense. He completed 18 of 52 passes (34.6%) for 330 yards with two touchdowns, seven interceptions, and a 73.7 quarterback rating. He also tallied 341 rushing yards on 120 carries for an average of 2.8 yards per carry.

The team's rushing leaders included fullback Don Goodman (455 yards, 111 carries, 4.1-yard average) and halfback Lindy Infante (369 yards, 85 carries, 4.3-yard average).

The team's passing leader was Tom Batten who completed 30 of 67 passes (44.8%) for 460 yards with three touchdowns, five interceptions, and a 102.3 quarterback rating.

The leading receivers were Russ Brown (13 passes, 239 yards), Bob Hoover (9 receptions, 213 yards), and Lindy Infante (11 receptions, 129 yards).

== Awards and honors ==
Tackle Jim Beaver was selected as the team captain.

Two Florida players were recognized on the 1961 All-SEC football team. Tackle Jim Beaver received second-team honors from the United Press International (UPI) and third-team honors from the Associated Press (AP). Halfback Don Goodman received third-team honors from both the AP and UPI.

== Personnel ==
=== Players ===
- Tom Batten, quarterback, junior, 5'11", 158 pounds, Miami, FL
- Jim Beaver, tackle and captain, senior, 6'1", 226 pounds, West Palm Beach, FL
- Russ Brown, end, sophomore, 6'2", 195 pounds, Miami, FL
- Bruce Culpepper, center, junior, 6'1", 225 pounds, Tallahassee, FL
- Floyd Dean, tackle, junior, 6'4", 230 pounds, Eagle Lake, FL
- Bobby Dodd Jr., quarterback, junior, 6'0", 173 pounds, Atlanta, GA
- Wade Entzminger, guard, junior, 5'10", 188 pounds, Tampa, FL
- Don Goodman, fullback, senior, 6'0", 197 pounds, Miami, FL
- Walt Hickenlooper, halfback, junior, 5'11", 170 pounds, Palatka, FL
- Sam Holland, end, junior, 6'1", 190 pounds, Key West, FL
- Bob Hoover, halfback, junior, 6'0", 197 pounds, Jacksonville, FL
- Lindy Infante, halfback, junior, 5'11", 178 pounds, Miami, FL
- Larry Libertore, quarterback, junior, 5'8", 138 pounds, Miami, FL
- Jim O'Donnell, fullback, sophomore, 5'11", 188 pounds, Clearwater, FL
- Fred Pearson, tackle, sophomore, 6'2", 225 pounds, Ocala, FL
- Anton Peters, tackle, junior, 6'4", 228 pounds, Tampa, FL
- Tom Smith, end, senior, 6'2", 193 pounds, Atlanta, GA
- Ron Stoner, halfback, junior, 5'10", 175 pounds, Troy, OH
- Jack Thompson, guard, sophomore, 5'9", 180 pounds, Savannah, GA
- Larry Travis, guard, junior, 6'0", 205 pounds, Miami, FL

=== Coaches and administrators ===
- Head coach: Ray Graves (2nd season)
- Assistant coaches: Pepper Rodgers (offensive backfield coach), Jim Powell (ends coach), John F. (Jack) Green (defensive line coach), Jimmy Dunn (backfield coach), John Donaldson (defensive backfield coach)

== Bibliography ==
- Golenbock, Peter (2002). Go Gators! An Oral History of Florida's Pursuit of Gridiron Glory. St. Petersburg, Florida: Legends Publishing, LLC. ISBN 0-9650782-1-3.
