= 1961 Kentucky Wildcats football team =

American college football season

1961 Kentucky Wildcats football
- Conference: Southeastern Conference
- Record: 5–5 (2–4 SEC)
- Head coach: Blanton Collier (8th season)
- Home stadium: McLean Stadium

1961 Southeastern Conference football standings
	Conf.					Overall
Team	W		L		T	W		L		T
No. 1 Alabama +	7	–	0	–	0	11	–	0	–	0
No. 4 LSU +	6	–	0	–	0	10	–	1	–	0
No. 5 Ole Miss	5	–	1	–	0	9	–	2	–	0
No. 13 Georgia Tech	4	–	3	–	0	7	–	4	–	0
Tennessee	4	–	3	–	0	6	–	4	–	0
Florida	3	–	3	–	0	4	–	5	–	1
Auburn	3	–	4	–	0	6	–	4	–	0
Kentucky	2	–	4	–	0	5	–	5	–	0
Georgia	2	–	5	–	0	3	–	7	–	0
Mississippi State	1	–	5	–	0	5	–	5	–	0
Tulane	1	–	5	–	0	2	–	8	–	0
Vanderbilt	1	–	6	–	0	2	–	8	–	0
+ – Conference co-champions; Rankings from AP Poll

The 1961 Kentucky Wildcats football team was an American football team that represented the University of Kentucky as a member of the Southeastern Conference (SEC) during the 1961 college football season. In their eighth season under head coach Blanton Collier, the Wildcats compiled a 5–5 record (2–4 in conference games), finished in eighth place in the SEC, and outscored opponents by a total of 138 to 123.

The Wildcats' statistical leaders included quarterback Jerry Woolum (892 passing yards), end Tom Hutchinson (32 receptions, 543 receiving yards), Gary Steward (285 rushing yards). Hutchinson was the only Kentucky player to receive first-team honors on the 1961 All-SEC football team.

The team played its home games at McLean Stadium in Lexington, Kentucky.

== Schedule ==
Date	Opponent	Site	Result	Attendance	Source
September 23	Miami (FL)*	McLean Stadium; Lexington, KY	L 7–14	35,000	
September 30	No. 2 Ole Miss	McLean Stadium; Lexington, KY	L 6–20	33,000	
October 7	at Auburn	Cliff Hare Stadium; Auburn, AL	W 14–12	32,000	
October 14	Kansas State*	McLean Stadium; Lexington, KY	W 21–8	23,000	
October 21	at No. 10 LSU	Tiger Stadium; Baton Rouge, LA	L 14–24	66,000	
October 28	at Georgia	Sanford Stadium; Athens, GA	L 15–16	31,000	
November 4	Florida State*	McLean Stadium; Lexington, KY	W 20–0	20,000	
November 11	at Vanderbilt	Dudley Field; Nashville, TN (rivalry)	W 16–3	23,000	
November 18	Xavier*	McLean Stadium; Lexington, KY	W 9–0	25,000	
November 25	Tennessee	McLean Stadium; Lexington, KY (rivalry)	L 16–26	37,000	
*Non-conference game; Rankings from Coaches' Poll released prior to the game

== Statistics ==
The Wildcats gained an average of 132.7 rushing yards and 126.5 passing yards per game. On defense, they gave up an average of 117.1 rushing yards and 89.3 passing yards per game.

Quarterback Jerry Woolum completed 70 of 125 passes (56.0%) for 892 yards with four touchdowns, seven interceptions, and a 115.3 quarterback rating. Backup quarterback John Rampulla completed 25 of 60 (41.7%) for 373 yards.

Kentucky had five backs who gained over 160 yards, led by halfback Gary Steward (285 yards, 79 carries, 3.6 yards per carry), halfback Bill Ransdell (278 yards, 73 carries, 3.8 yards per carry), and fullback Howard Dunnebacke (276 yards, 67 carries, 4.1 yards per carry).

End Tom Hutchinson led the team with 32 receptions for 543 yards and also led the team in scoring with 30 points.

Darrell Cox returned 21 punts for 281 yards, an average of 13.4 yards per return.

== Awards and honors ==
End Tom Hutchinson won first-team honors from both the Associated Press (AP) and United Press International (UPI) on the 1961 All-SEC football team. Quarterback Jerry Woolum, center Irv Goode, and end Dave Gash were named to the third team by the UPI.

== Personnel ==
=== Players ===
- Perky Bryant, fullback
- Bob Butler, tackle/guard
- Mel Chandler, guard
- Gary Cochran, fullback
- Darrell Cox, halfback
- Jerry Dickerson, guard
- Howard Dunnebacke, fullback
- Dave Gash, end, junior
- Irv Goode, center, senior
- Junior Hawthorne, tackle, junio4
- Tom Hutchinson, end, junior
- Jon Jurgens, guard
- John Mutchler, center
- John Rampulla, quarterback
- Bill Ransdell, halfback
- Tommy Simpson, end, junior
- Gary Steward, halfback
- Herschel Turner, tackle
- Jerry Woolum, quarterback

=== Coaches and administrators ===
- Head coach: Blanton Collier
- Assistant coaches:
