= Roy Winston =

American football player (1940–2022)

No. 60
- Position: Linebacker

Personal information
- Born: September 15, 1940; Baton Rouge, Louisiana, U.S.
- Died: March 5, 2022 (aged 81); Birmingham, Alabama, U.S.
- Listed height: 6 ft 1 in (1.85 m)
- Listed weight: 230 lb (104 kg)

Career information
- High school: Istrouma (Baton Rouge, LA)
- College: LSU
- NFL draft: 1962: 4th round, 45th overall pick
- AFL draft: 1962: 6th round, 42nd overall pick

Career history
- Minnesota Vikings (1962–1976)

Awards and highlights
- NFL champion (1969); 50 Greatest Vikings; Minnesota Vikings 25th Anniversary Team; Unanimous All-American (1961); First-team All-SEC (1961); Second-team All-SEC (1960)

Career NFL statistics
- Interceptions: 12
- Interception yards: 138
- Fumble recoveries: 14
- Sacks: 15.5
- Safeties: 1
- Total touchdowns: 3
- Stats at Pro Football Reference

Roy Charles Winston (September 15, 1940 – March 5, 2022) was an American professional football player. He played 15 seasons as a linebacker in the National Football League (NFL) for the Minnesota Vikings.

Winston graduated from Louisiana State University, where he was a standout guard and linebacker in the 10–7 LSU victory over arch-rival Ole Miss in 1961. Following the season he was named a unanimous All-American as LSU finished as Southeastern Conference co-champions with Alabama. LSU finished the regular season 9-1 and ranked fourth in the polls, then defeated Colorado 25–7 in the Orange Bowl.

He was drafted in the fourth round of the 1962 NFL draft by the Vikings, for whom he played until he retired after the 1976 season. During that time, he was one of 11 players to play in all four of the Vikings Super Bowl appearances (Super Bowl IV, Super Bowl VIII, Super Bowl IX, Super Bowl XI). Winston started the first three Viking Super Bowls at left (strong side) linebacker; by time the Vikings reached Super Bowl XI, he was a reserve, replaced in the starting lineup by Matt Blair. Winston's counterpart at right (weak side) linebacker, Wally Hilgenberg, also played in all four Viking Super Bowls, as did fellow defenders Carl Eller, Alan Page, Jim Marshall and Paul Krause.

Winston delivered one of the most devastating tackles ever filmed. In a game against the Miami Dolphins in 1972, fullback Larry Csonka circled out into the flat to catch a pass. Just as he caught the pass, Winston hit him from behind with such force that the 240-pound Csonka was nearly cut in half. The tackle was so grotesque it was shown on The Tonight Show. Csonka dropped the ball and rolled on the field in agony. He thought his back was broken and literally crawled off the field (he was not seriously injured, however). After their respective retirements from the NFL, Winston and Csonka remained close friends. Csonka invited Winston to be his guest when Csonka was inducted into the Pro Football Hall of Fame.

In 1976, Winston was inducted into the LSU Hall of Fame; in 1991, into the Louisiana Sports Hall of Fame in Natchitoches.

Winston died on March 5, 2022, at the age of 81.
