= Doug Elmore =

American football player (1939–2002)

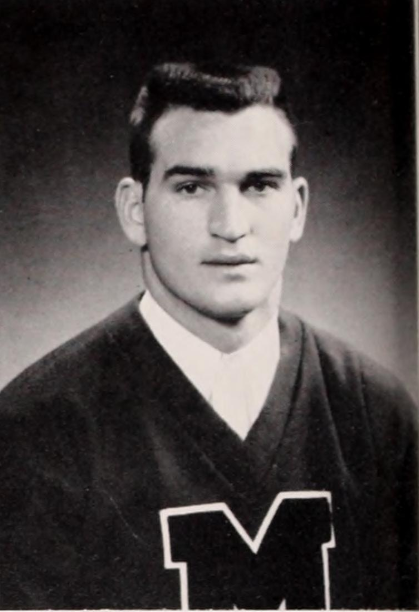

No. 48
- Positions: Punter, defensive back, quarterback

Personal information
- Born: December 15, 1939; Reform, Alabama, U.S.
- Died: June 28, 2002 (aged 62); Jackson, Mississippi, U.S.
- Listed height: 6 ft 0 in (1.83 m)
- Listed weight: 188 lb (85 kg)

Career information
- High school: Pickens County (AL)
- College: Ole Miss
- NFL draft: 1961: 13th round, 171st overall pick
- AFL draft: 1962: 31st round, 248th overall pick

Career history
- Washington Redskins (1962); Calgary Stampeders (1963)

Awards and highlights
- National champion (1960); Second-team All-SEC (1961); Ole Miss Sports Hall of Fame; Mississippi Sports Hall of Fame

Career NFL statistics
- Punts: 54
- Punting yards: 1,860
- Longest punt: 52
- Interceptions: 2
- Fumble recoveries: 1
- Stats at Pro Football Reference

James Douglas Elmore (December 15, 1939 – June 28, 2002) was an American professional football player who was a punter in the National Football League (NFL) for the Washington Redskins and in the Canadian Football League (CFL) for the Calgary Stampeders. He played college football and baseball at the University of Mississippi.

== Early life ==
Elmore attended and played high school football at Pickens County High School in Reform, Alabama. He received Alabama All-State and Class A "Back of the Year" honors in 1956 when he served as the team's captain. Elmore earned three letters in football, basketball, and baseball.

== College career ==
=== Football ===
Elmore attended and played college football at the University of Mississippi, during which the Rebels posted a 29-3-1 record. He was also a member of Rebels when they won a share of the national championship in 1959 and 1960 and played in two Sugar Bowls (1960, 1961) and one Cotton Bowl Classic (1962).

During his senior year in 1961, Elmore completed 50-of-84 passes (59.5 percent) for 741 yards and six touchdowns, and ranked second on team in rushing with 345 yards on 77 carries (4.5 average) with three touchdowns. He also recorded two pass interceptions for 76 yards, averaged 32.3 yards on 24 punts, returned one kickoff for 18 yards and averaged 6.5 yards on four punt returns. In 1961, Elmore helped lead Ole Miss to a 9–2 record that season and was an All-America first-team selection. He received All-Southeastern Conference second-team honors from Associated Press and United Press International, and also earned Academic All-America and Academic All-SEC accolades in 1961. Following the season, Elmore played in the 1962 Coaches Association All-America Bowl.

For his career, Elmore completed 82-of-139 passes for 1,216 yards and 11 touchdowns, and his 59.0 completion percentage still ranks fourth best in Ole Miss history. He had 1,827 career total offense yards (611 rushing, 1,216 passing) on 275 plays, averaging 6.64 yards per play. The 6.64 yard-per-play average still ranks fourth best all-time at Ole Miss. Elmore also accounted for 22 touchdowns.

=== Baseball ===
Elmore also played baseball for the Rebels as a center fielder and helped Ole Miss win 1960 Southeastern Conference championship. He earned All-SEC and All-SEC Western Division baseball honors in 1961.

== Professional career ==
Elmore was selected in the thirteenth round of the 1961 NFL draft by the Washington Redskins. He was also selected in the 31st round of the 1961 AFL draft by the San Diego Chargers. He played for the Redskins during the 1962 season and in the CFL for the Calgary Stampeders during the 1963 season.

== After football ==
Elmore was an assistant coach for one year at Southeastern Louisiana University, then was the vice president of Boyles Moak Brickell Marchetti Insurance, Inc.

== Personal ==
Elmore had a wife, Linda; a son, Jimmy; a daughter, Sharon Duncan; and four grandchildren.
