= 1961 Georgia Bulldogs football team =

American college football season

1961 Georgia Bulldogs football
- Conference: Southeastern Conference
- Record: 3–7 (2–5 SEC)
- Head coach: Johnny Griffith (1st season)
- Home stadium: Sanford Stadium

1961 Southeastern Conference football standings
	Conf.					Overall
Team	W		L		T	W		L		T
No. 1 Alabama +	7	–	0	–	0	11	–	0	–	0
No. 4 LSU +	6	–	0	–	0	10	–	1	–	0
No. 5 Ole Miss	5	–	1	–	0	9	–	2	–	0
No. 13 Georgia Tech	4	–	3	–	0	7	–	4	–	0
Tennessee	4	–	3	–	0	6	–	4	–	0
Florida	3	–	3	–	0	4	–	5	–	1
Auburn	3	–	4	–	0	6	–	4	–	0
Kentucky	2	–	4	–	0	5	–	5	–	0
Georgia	2	–	5	–	0	3	–	7	–	0
Mississippi State	1	–	5	–	0	5	–	5	–	0
Tulane	1	–	5	–	0	2	–	8	–	0
Vanderbilt	1	–	6	–	0	2	–	8	–	0
+ – Conference co-champions; Rankings from AP Poll

The 1961 Georgia Bulldogs football team was an American football team that represented the University of Georgia as a member of the Southeastern Conference (SEC) during the 1961 college football season. In their first year under head coach Johnny Griffith, the Bulldogs compiled a 3–7 record (2–5 in conference games), finished in ninth place in the SEC, and were outscored by a total of 177 to 84.

The team's statistical leaders included Larry Rakestraw (710 passing yards) and Billy McKenny (328 rushing yards, 202 receiving yards). Tackle Peter Case received first-team honors on the 1961 All-SEC football team.

The team played its home games at Sanford Stadium in Athens, Georgia.

== Schedule ==
Date	Opponent	Site	Result	Attendance	Source
September 23	No. 3 Alabama	Sanford Stadium; Athens, GA (rivalry)	L 6–32	44,000	
September 30	Vanderbilt	Sanford Stadium; Athens, GA (rivalry)	L 0–21	22,000	
October 7	South Carolina*	Sanford Stadium; Athens, GA (rivalry)	W 17–14	30,000	
October 14	at Florida State*	Doak Campbell Stadium; Tallahassee, FL	L 0–3	21,200	
October 21	vs. Mississippi State	Grant Field; Atlanta, GA	W 10–7	18,000	
October 28	Kentucky^{†}	Sanford Stadium; Athens, GA	W 16–15	31,000	
November 3	at Miami (FL)*	Miami Orange Bowl; Miami, FL	L 7–32	38,210	
November 11	vs. Florida	Gator Bowl Stadium; Jacksonville, FL (rivalry)	L 14–21	47,000	
November 18	Auburn	Sanford Stadium; Athens, GA (rivalry)	L 7–10	41,000	
December 2	at Georgia Tech	Grant Field; Atlanta, GA (rivalry)	L 7–22	47,098	
*Non-conference game; ^{†}Homecoming; Rankings from AP Poll released prior to the game

== Statistics ==
The Bulldogs gained an average of 104.3 rushing yards and 92.0 passing yards per game. On defense, they gave up 138.5 rushing yards and 91.0 passing yards per game.

Quarterback Larry Rakestraw completed 68 of 136 passes (50.0%) for 710 yards with four touchdowns, 12 interceptions, and an 85.9 quarterback rating. Rakestraw also rushed for 131 yards for a team-best 841 yards of total offense.

Bill McKenny led the team in both rushing (328 yards, 81 carries, 4.0-yard average) and receiving (23 passes, 202 yards). Other notable performers were Bill Godfrey (234 rushing yards, 64 carries, 3.7-yard average) and John Landry (11 receptions, 191 yards).

== Awards and honors ==
Tackle Peter Case received first-team honors from the Associated Press (AP) and second team honors from the United Press International (UPI) on the 1961 All-SEC football team.

Quarterback Larry Rakestraw was selected as the quarterback on the AP's All-SEC sophomore football team.

== Personnel ==
=== Players ===
- Bobby Allen, guard, 207 pounds
- Frederick Amtower
- Michael Babb
- Elmer Blanchard
- Richard Boykin, halfback, 165 pounds
- Rooks Boynton
- Ronald Lee "Pete" Case, tackle and captain, 221 pounds
- George Cheek
- Clyde Childers, end, 207 pounds
- Ray Clark, end and captain, 207 pounds
- James Cone
- MacArthur Faircloth
- David Aaron Godfrey, fullback, 195 pounds
- Bobby Green
- Carlton Guthrie
- Len Hauss, center, 215 pounds
- Paul Holmes, Jr., tackle, 212 pounds
- William Ivey
- Richard Kelly
- William Knowles, Jr., halfback, 167 pounds
- John Landry, Jr., end, 182 pounds
- Raymond Maddox
- John McEachern
- Charles J. McKenny, III
- Bill McKenny, halfback, 185 pounds
- Durward Pennington, Jr.
- Larry Rakestraw, quarterback, sophomore, 188 pounds
- Jake Saye, quarterback, 176 pounds
- Patrick Smith, center, 200 pounds
- Wayne Taylor, fullback, 195 pounds
- Kenneth Vann, guard, 215 pounds
- Leonard Vella
- A.D. Watson, III
- Ralph Westmoreland
- Langdale Williams
- Wallace Williamson, guard, 200 pounds
- Brigham Woodward

=== Coaches and staff ===
- Head coach: Johnny Griffith
