= 1961 Vanderbilt Commodores football team =

American college football season

1961 Vanderbilt Commodores football
- Conference: Southeastern Conference
- Record: 2–8 (1–6 SEC)
- Head coach: Art Guepe (9th season)
- Home stadium: Dudley Field

1961 Southeastern Conference football standings
	Conf.					Overall
Team	W		L		T	W		L		T
No. 1 Alabama +	7	–	0	–	0	11	–	0	–	0
No. 4 LSU +	6	–	0	–	0	10	–	1	–	0
No. 5 Ole Miss	5	–	1	–	0	9	–	2	–	0
No. 13 Georgia Tech	4	–	3	–	0	7	–	4	–	0
Tennessee	4	–	3	–	0	6	–	4	–	0
Florida	3	–	3	–	0	4	–	5	–	1
Auburn	3	–	4	–	0	6	–	4	–	0
Kentucky	2	–	4	–	0	5	–	5	–	0
Georgia	2	–	5	–	0	3	–	7	–	0
Mississippi State	1	–	5	–	0	5	–	5	–	0
Tulane	1	–	5	–	0	2	–	8	–	0
Vanderbilt	1	–	6	–	0	2	–	8	–	0
+ – Conference co-champions; Rankings from AP Poll

The 1961 Vanderbilt Commodores football team represented Vanderbilt University in the 1961 college football season. The Commodores were led by head coach Art Guepe in his ninth season and finished the season with a record of two wins and eight losses (2–8 overall, 1–6 in the SEC).

== Schedule ==
Date	Opponent	Site	Result	Attendance	Source
September 23	West Virginia*	Dudley Field; Nashville, TN	W 16–6	18,000	
September 30	at Georgia	Sanford Stadium; Athens, GA (rivalry)	W 21–0	22,000	
October 7	No. 4 Alabama	Dudley Field; Nashville, TN	L 6–35	32,500	
October 14	at UCLA*	Los Angeles Memorial Coliseum; Los Angeles, CA	L 21–28	23,704	
October 21	Florida	Dudley Field; Nashville, TN	L 0–7	18,000	
October 28	No. 2 Ole Miss	Dudley Field; Nashville, TN (rivalry)	L 0–47	25,000	
November 11	Kentucky	Dudley Field; Nashville, TN (rivalry)	L 3–16	23,000	
November 17	at Tulane	Tulane Stadium; New Orleans, LA	L 14–17	15,000	
November 25	South Carolina*	Dudley Field; Nashville, TN	L 7–23	12,500	
December 2	at Tennessee	Shields–Watkins Field; Knoxville, TN (rivalry)	L 7–41	29,130	
*Non-conference game; Rankings from AP Poll released prior to the game
