= 1961 Auburn Tigers football team =

American college football season

1961 Auburn Tigers football
- Conference: Southeastern Conference
- Record: 6–4 (3–4 SEC)
- Head coach: Ralph Jordan (11th season)
- Home stadium: Cliff Hare Stadium; Legion Field

1961 Southeastern Conference football standings
	Conf.					Overall
Team	W		L		T	W		L		T
No. 1 Alabama +	7	–	0	–	0	11	–	0	–	0
No. 4 LSU +	6	–	0	–	0	10	–	1	–	0
No. 5 Ole Miss	5	–	1	–	0	9	–	2	–	0
No. 13 Georgia Tech	4	–	3	–	0	7	–	4	–	0
Tennessee	4	–	3	–	0	6	–	4	–	0
Florida	3	–	3	–	0	4	–	5	–	1
Auburn	3	–	4	–	0	6	–	4	–	0
Kentucky	2	–	4	–	0	5	–	5	–	0
Georgia	2	–	5	–	0	3	–	7	–	0
Mississippi State	1	–	5	–	0	5	–	5	–	0
Tulane	1	–	5	–	0	2	–	8	–	0
Vanderbilt	1	–	6	–	0	2	–	8	–	0
+ – Conference co-champions; Rankings from AP Poll

The 1961 Auburn Tigers football team was an American football team that represented Auburn University as a member of the Southeastern Conference (SEC) during the 1961 college football season. In their 11th year under head coach Ralph "Shug" Jordan, the Tigers compiled a 6–4 record (3–4 in conference games), finished in seventh place in the SEC, and outscored opponents by a total of 174 to 137. It was the Tigers' 70th overall and 28th season as a member of the SEC.

The team's statistical leaders included Bobby Hunt (703 passing yards, 1,051 yards of total offense), Larry Rawson (448 rushing yards), and Dave Edwards (372 receiving yards).

The team played five of its home games at Cliff Hare Stadium in Auburn, Alabama, and two at Legion Field in Birmingham, Alabama.

== Schedule ==
Date	Opponent	Site	Result	Attendance	Source
September 30	at Tennessee	Shields–Watkins Field; Knoxville, TN	W 24–21	44,600	
October 7	Kentucky	Cliff Hare Stadium; Auburn, AL	L 12–14	32,000	
October 14	Chattanooga*	Cliff Hare Stadium; Auburn, AL	W 35–7	22,000	
October 21	at No. 8 Georgia Tech	Grant Field; Atlanta, GA	L 6–7	45,376	
October 28	Clemson*^{†}	Cliff Hare Stadium; Auburn, AL	W 24–14	36,000	
November 4	Wake Forest*	Cliff Hare Stadium; Auburn, AL	W 21–7	20,000	
November 11	Mississippi State	Legion Field; Birmingham, AL	L 10–11	35,000	
November 18	at Georgia	Sanford Stadium; Athens, GA (rivalry)	W 10–7	41,000	
November 25	Florida	Cliff Hare Stadium; Auburn, AL (rivalry)	W 32–15	33,000	
December 2	vs. No. 1 Alabama	Legion Field; Birmingham, AL (Iron Bowl)	L 0–34	54,000	
*Non-conference game; ^{†}Homecoming; Rankings from AP Poll released prior to the game

== Statistics ==
The Tigers gained an average of 243.7 yards per game (143.6 rushing, 100.1 passing). On defense, they gave up 144.3 rushing yards and 79.7 passing yards per game.

The offense was led by senior quarterback Bobby Hunt who completed 54 of 118 passes (45.8%) for 703 yards with two touchdowns, eight interceptions, and an 87.8 quarterback rating. Hunt also ranked second in rushing (247 yards) and pass interceptions (three). He led the team with 1,050 yards of total offense; he finished his Auburn career with 2,279 yards of total offense, third best in Auburn history to that date. Hunt and kicking specialist Woody Woodall tied for the team's scoring lead with 36 points each. After the season, head coach Jordan said, "I don't know what we'd have done without [Hunt]."

The rushing defense was led by sophomore fullback Larry Rawson (448 yards, 121 carries, 3.7-yard average), Bobby Hunt (347 yards, 101 carries, 3.4-yard average), Don Machen (187 yards, 38 carries, 4.9-yard average), Jimmy Burson (187 yards, 44 carries, 4.3-yard average), and Larry Laster (187 yards, 44 carries, 4.4-yard average).

The team's leading receivers were Dave Edwards (372 yards, 25 receptions) and Bobby Foret (131 yards, 10 receptions).

Bo Davis was the team's punter, kicking 55 times for 2,034 yards, an average of 36.9 yards per punt.

== Awards and honors ==
Four Auburn players were recognized by the Associated Press (AP) or United Press International (UPI) on the 1961 All-SEC football team: end Dave Edwards (AP-1, UPI-1); halfback Bobby Hunt (UPI-3); center Wayne Frazier (AP-3); and tackle Billy Wilson (UPI-3).

== Personnel ==
=== Players ===
- Joe Baughan (#76), guard, junior, 6'3", 225 pounds, Bessemer, AL
- Jimmy Burson (#22), halfback, junior, 5'10", 178 pounds, LaGrange, GA
- Bo Davis, punter
- Don Downs (#88), end, junior, 6'0", 200 pounds, Birmingham, AL
- Dave Edwards (#80), end, senior, 6'1", 198 pounds, Abbeyville, AL
- Bobby Foret (#85), end, senior, 6'1", 198 pounds, New Orleans, LA
- Wayne Frazier (#51), center, senior, 6'2", 230 pounds, Evergreen, AL
- Winky Giddens (#79), tackle, junior, 6'2", 225 pounds, Childersburg, AL
- George Gross
- Bobby Hunt (#12), quarterback, senior, 6'1, 180 pounds, Lanett, AL
- Mailon Kent (#15), quarterback, sophomore, 6'2", 185 pounds, Birmingham, AL
- Larry Laster (#35), fullback, junior, 5'11", 195 pounds, Covington, GA
- Don Machen (#23), halfback, senior, 5'9", 150 pounds, Sylacauga, AL
- John McGeever (#36), halfback, senior, 6'0", 195 pounds, Birmingham, AL
- Joe Overton (#16), quarterback, junior, 6'2", 190 pounds, Greenville, MS
- Jim Price (#58), center, junior, 6'3", 225 pounds, Birmingham, AL
- Jimmy Putnam (#65), guard, senior, 6'0", 200 pounds, Birmingham, AL
- Larry Rawson (#30), fullback, sophomore, 6'0", 202 pounds, Pensacola, FL
- Billy Wilson (#78), tackle, senior, 6'2", 250 pounds, Birmingham, AL
- Woody Woodall, kicking specialist

=== Coaches ===
- Head coach: Ralph Jordan
- Assistant coaches: George Atkins, Joe Connally, Vince Dooley, Joel Eaves, Hal Herring, Billy Kinard, Gene Lorendo, Dick McGovern, J. D. Roberts, Erk Russell, C.L. Senn
