= Neil Thomas (Canadian football) =

Canadian football player (born c. 1940)

Profile
- Position: Defensive tackle

Personal information
- Born: c. 1940
- Listed height: 6 ft 1 in (1.85 m)
- Listed weight: 250 lb (113 kg)

Career information
- College: Hillsdale
- AFL draft: 1962: 24th round, 186th overall pick

Career history
- 1962–1964: Winnipeg Blue Bombers

Awards and highlights
- Grey Cup champion (1962)

Neil Thomas (born c. 1940) was a Canadian football player who played for the Winnipeg Blue Bombers. He won the Grey Cup with them in 1962. He played college football at Hillsdale College in Hillsdale, Michigan. He was drafted by the Denver Broncos in the 1962 American Football League Draft.
