= 1961 Georgia Tech Yellow Jackets football team =

American college football season

1961 Georgia Tech Yellow Jackets football

Gator Bowl, L 15–30 vs. Penn State
- Conference: Southeastern Conference

Ranking
- Coaches: No. 13
- AP: No. 13
- Record: 7–4 (4–3 SEC)
- Head coach: Bobby Dodd (17th season)
- Captains: Chick Graning; Willie McGaughey; Billy Williamson
- Home stadium: Grant Field

1961 Southeastern Conference football standings
	Conf.					Overall
Team	W		L		T	W		L		T
No. 1 Alabama +	7	–	0	–	0	11	–	0	–	0
No. 4 LSU +	6	–	0	–	0	10	–	1	–	0
No. 5 Ole Miss	5	–	1	–	0	9	–	2	–	0
No. 13 Georgia Tech	4	–	3	–	0	7	–	4	–	0
Tennessee	4	–	3	–	0	6	–	4	–	0
Florida	3	–	3	–	0	4	–	5	–	1
Auburn	3	–	4	–	0	6	–	4	–	0
Kentucky	2	–	4	–	0	5	–	5	–	0
Georgia	2	–	5	–	0	3	–	7	–	0
Mississippi State	1	–	5	–	0	5	–	5	–	0
Tulane	1	–	5	–	0	2	–	8	–	0
Vanderbilt	1	–	6	–	0	2	–	8	–	0
+ – Conference co-champions; Rankings from AP Poll

The 1961 Georgia Tech Yellow Jackets football team was an American football team that represented the Georgia Institute of Technology (Georgia Tech) as a member of the Southeastern Conference (SEC) during the 1961 college football season. In their 17th year under head coach Bobby Dodd, the Yellow Jackets compiled a 7–3 record (4–3 in conference games), tied for fourth place in the SEC, and outscored opponents by a total of 162 to 50. They were ranked 13th in the final AP and UPI polls, and were invited to the 1961 Gator Bowl, where they lost to Penn State.

The team played its home games at Grant Field in Atlanta.

== Schedule ==
Date	Opponent	Rank	Site	TV	Result	Attendance	Source
September 22	at USC*		Los Angeles Memorial Coliseum; Los Angeles, CA		W 27–7	36,950	
September 30	No. 7 Rice*		Grant Field; Atlanta, GA		W 24–0	43,501	
October 7	at LSU	No. 3	Tiger Stadium; Baton Rouge, LA		L 0–10	66,000	
October 14	Duke*		Grant Field; Atlanta, GA		W 21–0	44,015	
October 21	Auburn	No. 8	Grant Field; Atlanta, GA (rivalry)		W 7–6	45,376	
October 28	at Tulane	No. 9	Tulane Stadium; New Orleans, LA		W 35–0	22,000	
November 4	Florida^{†}	No. 7	Grant Field; Atlanta, GA		W 20–0	44,940	
November 11	at Tennessee	No. 9	Shields–Watkins Field; Knoxville, TN (rivalry)		L 6–10	46,000	
November 18	at No. 2 Alabama		Legion Field; Birmingham, AL (rivalry)		L 0–10	53,000	
December 2	Georgia		Grant Field; Atlanta, GA (rivalry)		W 22–7	47,098	
December 30	vs. No. 17 Penn State*	No. 13	Gator Bowl Stadium; Jacksonville, FL (Gator Bowl)	CBS	L 15–30	50,202	
*Non-conference game; ^{†}Homecoming; Rankings from AP Poll released prior to the game

== Statistics ==
The team gained an average of 164.9 rushing yards and 91.2 passing yards per game. On defense, they gave up 105.4 rushing yards and 47.0 passing yards per game.

The passing offense was led by quarterbacks Stan Gann (43-for-79, 450 yards) and Billy Lothridge (26-for-63, 371 yards).

The rushing offense was led by backs Mike McNamee (350 yards, 94 carries, 3.7-yard average), Billy Williamson (331 yards, 63 carries, 5.3-yard average), and Chick Graning (184 yards, 48 carries, 3.8-yard average).

The team's leading receivers were Billy Martin (16 receptions, 233 yards), Billy Williamson (21 receptions, 221 yards), and Joe Auer (10 receptions, 145 yards).

== Awards and honors ==
The team selected three captains for the 1961 team: center Willie McGaughey and halfbacks Billy Williamson and Chick Graning.

Guard Dave Watson was selected by both the Associated Press (AP) and United Press International (UPI) as a first-team player on the 1961 All-SEC football team. Others receiving All-SEC honors were halfback Billy Williamson (AP-3, UPI-2) and guards Harold Erickson (AP-2) and Rufus Guthrie (UPI-2).

== Personnel ==
=== Players ===
- Joe Auer, halfback
- Foy Bentley, guard
- Mike Biddle, guard
- Bobby Caldwell, center
- Mickey Carmack, halfback
- Joe Chapman, end
- Ed Chancey, center
- Doug Cooper, halfback
- Ted Davis, end
- Wink Davis, linebacker
- Bob Dobyns, guard
- Buddy Elders, end
- Harold Erickson, guard
- Bill Farrington, tackle
- Russ Foret, tackle
- Stan Gann, quarterback
- Chick Granning, halfback
- Ed Griffin, tackle
- Ronnie Grubbs, guard
- Rufus Guthrie, guard
- Raymond Holt, center
- Vic Laxson, tackle
- Al Lederle, end
- Bob Lincoln, tackle
- Harry Littleton, halfback
- Billy Lothridge, quarterback
- Billy Martin, end
- Jon Martin, fullback
- John Matlock, guard
- Willie McGaughey, center
- Mike McNames, fullback
- Ray Mendheim, fullback
- Jack Moss, guard
- Jimmy Nail, halfback
- Mike Nicholl, tackle
- Mike O'Neill, fullback
- Lee Reid, fullback
- Frank Sexton, end
- Bob Sheridan, halfback
- Zollie Sircy, halfback
- Bob Solomon, end
- Larry Stallings, tackle
- Dave Steadman, tackle
- George Swanson, guard/tackle
- Don Toner, corner linebacker/halfback
- Carlton Waskey, center
- Dave Watson, guard
- Ed Weinman, corner linebacker/fullback
- Billy Williamson, halfback
- Bill Wilson, tackle
- Tom Winninger, halfback
- John Wright, end

=== Coaches and administrators ===
- Head coach: Bobby Dodd
- Assistant coaches: Jack Griffin, Charlie Tate, Lewis Woodruff, Dick Inman, John Robert Bell, Jimmy Carlen, Art Davis, Jesse Berry, Jim Luck, Spec Landrum, Billy "Dynamite" Goodloe
- Trainer: Henry L. "Buck" Andel
- Athletic director: Bobby Dodd
