= 1961 Alabama Crimson Tide football team =

American college football season

1961 Alabama Crimson Tide football
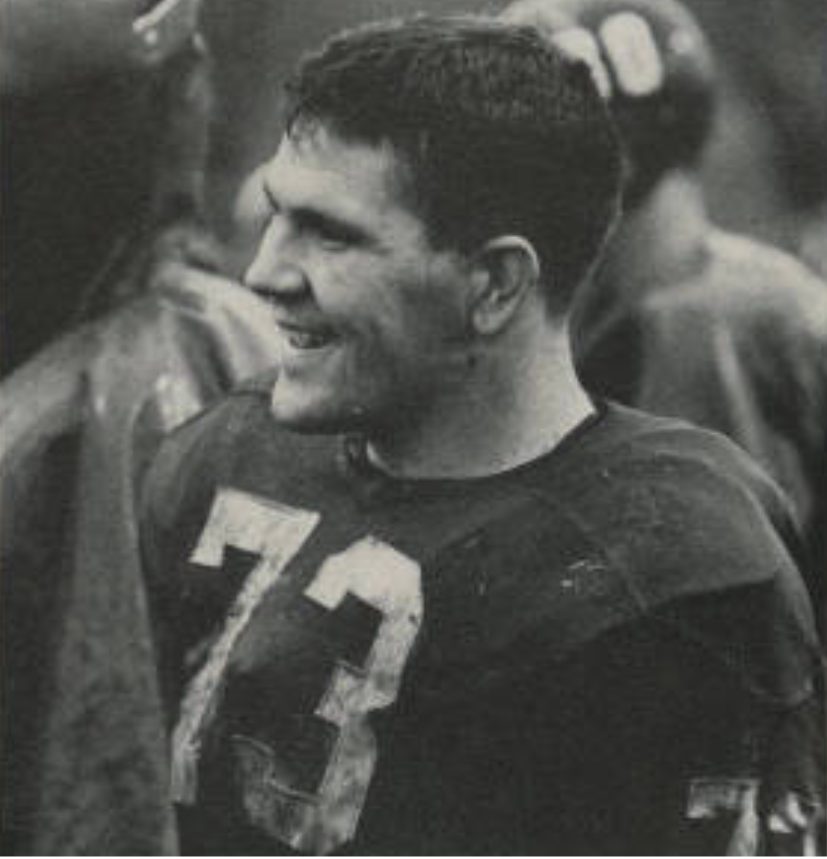
- Billy Neighbors during NC State game, 1961

Consensus national champion NFF national champion Sugar Bowl champion SEC co-champion

Sugar Bowl, W 10–3 vs. Arkansas
- Conference: Southeastern Conference

Ranking
- Coaches: No. 1
- AP: No. 1
- Record: 11–0 (7–0 SEC)
- Head coach: Bear Bryant (4th season)
- Offensive coordinator: Howard Schnellenberger (1st season)
- Captains: Billy Neighbors; Pat Trammell
- Home stadium: Denny Stadium; Legion Field; Ladd Memorial Stadium

1961 Southeastern Conference football standings
	Conf.					Overall
Team	W		L		T	W		L		T
No. 1 Alabama +	7	–	0	–	0	11	–	0	–	0
No. 4 LSU +	6	–	0	–	0	10	–	1	–	0
No. 5 Ole Miss	5	–	1	–	0	9	–	2	–	0
No. 13 Georgia Tech	4	–	3	–	0	7	–	4	–	0
Tennessee	4	–	3	–	0	6	–	4	–	0
Florida	3	–	3	–	0	4	–	5	–	1
Auburn	3	–	4	–	0	6	–	4	–	0
Kentucky	2	–	4	–	0	5	–	5	–	0
Georgia	2	–	5	–	0	3	–	7	–	0
Mississippi State	1	–	5	–	0	5	–	5	–	0
Tulane	1	–	5	–	0	2	–	8	–	0
Vanderbilt	1	–	6	–	0	2	–	8	–	0
+ – Conference co-champions; Rankings from AP Poll

The 1961 Alabama Crimson Tide football team (variously "Alabama", "UA" or "Bama") represented the University of Alabama in the 1961 college football season. It was the Crimson Tide's 67th overall and 28th season as a member of the Southeastern Conference (SEC). The team was led by head coach Bear Bryant, in his fourth year, and played their home games at Denny Stadium in Tuscaloosa, Legion Field in Birmingham and Ladd Stadium in Mobile, Alabama. They finished season undefeated with eleven wins (11–0 overall, 7–0 in the SEC), with a victory over Arkansas in the Sugar Bowl and as consensus national champions. The 1961 national championship was the first of the six that Bear Bryant would win as head coach of the Crimson Tide.

Alabama opened the season with a win over Georgia on the road in week one, and then defeated Tulane in its first home game at Ladd Stadium in week two. After they won their second road game of the season at Vanderbilt, Alabama returned to Tuscaloosa where they defeated NC State in the first Denny Stadium game of the season. The next week, Alabama defeated Tennessee for the first time since the 1954 season in the first Legion Field game of the year.

The Crimson Tide then defeated Houston in their final road game of the season and then returned home and defeated Mississippi State on homecoming in Tuscaloosa. The next week Alabama scored their most points in a game since the 1951 season when they defeated Richmond, 66–0. They then closed the regular season with wins over Georgia Tech and Auburn in the Iron Bowl. At the end of the regular season, they were ranked No. 1 in both the AP writers poll and the UPI coaches poll. The Crimson Tide then closed the season with a victory over Arkansas in the Sugar Bowl.

== Schedule ==
Date	Opponent	Rank	Site	TV	Result	Attendance	Source
September 23	at Georgia	No. 3	Sanford Stadium; Athens, GA (rivalry)		W 32–6	44,000	
September 30	Tulane	No. 4	Ladd Memorial Stadium; Mobile, AL		W 9–0	33,000	
October 7	at Vanderbilt	No. 4	Dudley Field; Nashville, TN		W 35–6	32,500	
October 14	NC State*	No. 3	Denny Stadium; Tuscaloosa, AL		W 26–7	30,000	
October 21	Tennessee	No. 5	Legion Field; Birmingham, AL (Third Saturday in October)	ABC	W 34–3	48,000	
October 28	at Houston*	No. 4	Rice Stadium; Houston, TX		W 17–0	24,000	
November 4	Mississippi State^{†}	No. 4	Denny Stadium; Tuscaloosa, AL (rivalry)		W 24–0	39,000	
November 11	Richmond*	No. 2	Denny Stadium; Tuscaloosa, AL		W 66–0	28,000	
November 18	Georgia Tech	No. 2	Legion Field; Birmingham, AL (rivalry)		W 10–0	53,000	
December 2	vs. Auburn	No. 1	Legion Field; Birmingham, AL (Iron Bowl)		W 34–0	54,000	
January 1, 1962	vs. No. 9 Arkansas*	No. 1	Tulane Stadium; New Orleans, LA (Sugar Bowl)	NBC	W 10–3	82,910	
*Non-conference game; ^{†}Homecoming; Rankings from AP Poll released prior to the game; Source:

== Game summaries ==
=== Georgia ===
Team	1	2	3	4	Total
• #3 Alabama	3	7	7	15	32
Georgia	0	0	0	6	6

- Date: September 23
- Location: Sanford Stadium
  Athens, Georgia
- Game attendance: 44,000

To open the 1961 season, the Crimson Tide defeated the Georgia Bulldogs 32–6 on the road at Athens. Alabama took a 10–0 halftime lead after Tim Davis connected on a 41-yard field goal in the first quarter and Mike Fracchia scored on a one-yard touchdown run in the second quarter. After a 37-yard Pat Trammell touchdown pass to Butch Wilson in the third, the Crimson Tide scored a pair of fourth-quarter touchdowns that extended their lead to 32–0. Fracchia scored first on a two-yard run and was followed with a seven-yard Mal Moore touchdown pass to Red Wilkins. The Bulldogs then scored on a 12-yard Langdale Williams touchdown pass to Carlton Guthrie that ended Alabama's bid for a shutout and made the final score 32–6.

=== Tulane ===
Team	1	2	3	4	Total
Tulane	0	0	0	0	0
• #4 Alabama	6	0	0	3	9

- Date: September 30
- Location: Ladd Stadium
  Mobile, Alabama
- Game attendance: 33,000

After their victory over Georgia in their season opener, Alabama dropped one position in the polls to the No. 4 position. At Mobile, the Crimson Tide shutout the Tulane Green Wave for the first time since the 1959 season in this 9–0 victory. Alabama scored their only touchdown in the first quarter on a 22-yard Pat Trammell pass to Tommy Brooker for a 6–0 lead. The Crimson Tide did not score again until a 25-yard Tim Davis field goal in the fourth quarter made the final score 9–0.

=== Vanderbilt ===
Team	1	2	3	4	Total
• #4 Alabama	13	15	7	0	35
Vanderbilt	0	6	0	0	6

- Date: October 7
- Location: Dudley Field
  Nashville, Tennessee
- Game attendance: 32,500

After their victory over Tulane at Ladd Stadium, Alabama retained the No. 4 position in the AP Poll prior to their game against Vanderbilt. Against the Commodores, the Crimson Tide won by a final score of 35–6 at Dudley Stadium in Nashville. Alabama took a 13–0 first quarter lead on touchdown runs of 66-yards by Mike Fracchia and eight-yards by Pat Trammell. Early in the second quarter, Trammell scored his second touchdown on a 16-yard run. This was followed with a 13-yard Henry Lesesne touchdown pass to Marion Starling for the Commodores and a one-yard Larry Wall touchdown run for Alabama that made the halftime score 28–6. Trammell then scored the final touchdown of the game in the third on a three-yard run that made the final score 35–6.

=== NC State ===
Team	1	2	3	4	Total
NC State	0	7	0	0	7
• #3 Alabama	0	12	0	14	26

- Date: October 14
- Location: Denny Stadium
  Tuscaloosa, Alabama
- Game attendance: 30,000

After their victory over Vanderbilt, Alabama moved up one position in the polls to the No. 3 spot prior to their first Denny Stadium game of the season. In what was their first non-conference game of the season, Alabama defeated the NC State Wolfpack 26–7 in Tuscaloosa. After a scoreless first quarter, the Wolfpack scored their only points of the game on a one-yard Roman Gabriel touchdown run for a 7–0 lead. The Crimson Tide responded with 26 unanswered points and won the game 26–7. Alabama touchdowns were scored on Pat Trammell passes of 12-yards to Richard Williamson and two-yards to Bill Battle in the second and on runs of five-yards by Trammell and 45-yards by Eddie Versprille in the fourth quarter.

=== Tennessee ===
Third Saturday in October

Team	1	2	3	4	Total
Tennessee	3	0	0	0	3
• #5 Alabama	14	6	7	7	34

- Date: October 21
- Location: Legion Field
  Birmingham, Alabama
- Game attendance: 48,000

Prior to their game against Tennessee, Alabama dropped two positions in the polls to the No. 5 spot prior to their first Legion Field game of the season. Against the Volunteers, Alabama won 34–3, and the victory was both the first for Alabama over Tennessee since the 1954 season and the largest since their 51–0 win in 1906. After Tennessee took an early 3–0 lead on a 53-yard George Shuford field goal, Alabama responded with 34 unanswered points. The Crimson Tide scored first-quarter touchdowns on a five-yard Mike Fracchia run and a nine-yard Pat Trammell pass to Butch Wilson and a pair of Tim Davis field goals in the second quarter for a 20–3 halftime lead. They then closed the game with touchdown runs of eight-yards by Billy Richardson in the third and one-yard by Trammell in the fourth quarter. After their win, Alabama was formally extended an invitation to compete in the inaugural National Trophy Bowl at Washington, D.C., only to later decline the invitation.

=== Houston ===
Team	1	2	3	4	Total
• #4 Alabama	0	10	7	0	17
Houston	0	0	0	0	0

- Date: October 28
- Location: Rice Stadium
  Houston, Texas
- Game attendance: 24,000

After their victory over Tennessee, the Crimson Tide moved up into the No. 4 position in the polls prior to their road game at Houston. In the first night game of the year, Alabama defeated a tough Cougars squad 17–0 at Rice Stadium. After a scoreless first quarter, the Crimson Tide took a 10–0 halftime lead on a 33-yard Tim Davis field goal and a five-yard Pat Trammell touchdown pass to Bill Oliver in the second quarter. Trammell then made the final score 17–0 with his two-yard touchdown run in the third quarter.

=== Mississippi State ===
Team	1	2	3	4	Total
Mississippi State	0	0	0	0	0
• #4 Alabama	14	3	0	7	24

- Date: November 4
- Location: Denny Stadium
  Tuscaloosa, Alabama
- Game attendance: 39,000

After their road shutout at Houston, Alabama returned to play Mississippi State in Tuscaloosa as the No. 4 ranked team for the second consecutive week. On what was homecoming in Denny Stadium, the Crimson Tide shutout the Bulldogs 24–0. Alabama took a 14–0 first quarter lead on touchdown runs of four-yards by Billy Richardson and one-yard by Pat Trammell, and after a 26-yard Tim Davis field goal in the second quarter led 17–0 at halftime. After a scoreless third quarter, the Crimson Tide closed the game with a one-yard Larry Wall touchdown run in the fourth quarter and made the final score 24–0.

=== Richmond ===
Team	1	2	3	4	Total
Richmond	0	0	0	0	0
• #2 Alabama	14	20	13	19	66

- Date: November 11
- Location: Denny Stadium
  Tuscaloosa, Alabama
- Game attendance: 28,000

Prior to their game against Richmond, the Crimson Tide moved into the No. 2 position in the weekly polls. In what was the only all-time meeting against the Spiders, Alabama won 66–0 and scored the most points in a game since their 89–0 win over Delta State in 1951. The Crimson Tide took a 34–0 halftime lead after first-quarter touchdown runs of one-yard by Pat Trammell and 30-yards by Larry Wall and second-quarter touchdowns on a four-yard Trammell pass to Richard Williamson and runs of 12 and one-yard by Wall. Alabama then closed the game with five second half touchdowns and won 66–0. Touchdowns were scored in the third quarter on a 66-yard Benny Nelson punt return and a 26-yard Jack Hurlbut pass to Red Wilkins and in the fourth quarter on runs of three-yards by Eddie Versprille, two-yards by Marlin Mooneyham and on a 28-yard Mal Moore pass to Jimmy Dill.

=== Georgia Tech ===
Team	1	2	3	4	Total
Georgia Tech	0	0	0	0	0
• #2 Alabama	0	7	3	0	10

- Date: November 18
- Location: Legion Field
  Birmingham, Alabama
- Game attendance: 53,000

For their game at Legion Field against Georgia Tech, the Crimson Tide remained in the No. 2 position in the national polls. Against the Yellow Jackets, Alabama won in a 10–0 shutout to move their record to nine wins and zero losses. After a scoreless first quarter, the Crimson Tide scored their only touchdown on a 16-yard Mike Fracchia run for a 7–0 lead. Tim Davis then made the final score 10–0 with his 32-yard field goal in the third quarter.

=== Auburn ===
Iron Bowl

Team	1	2	3	4	Total
Auburn	0	0	0	0	0
• #1 Alabama	7	17	7	3	34

- Date: December 2
- Location: Legion Field
  Birmingham, Alabama
- Game attendance: 54,000

After their win over Tech combined with No. 1 Texas' loss to TCU, the Crimson Tide moved into the No. 1 position in the polls prior to their game against Auburn. Against the Tigers in the annual Iron Bowl game at Legion Field, Alabama shutout Auburn for the third consecutive season, this time by a score of 34–0 and completed an undefeated regular season. After Billy Richardson gave Alabama a 7–0 first quarter lead with his 11-yard touchdown run, they scored 17 second quarter points and took a 24–0 halftime lead. In the second, Pat Trammell scored on a one-yard run, Tim Davis connected on a 35-yard field goal and Trammell threw a 19-yard touchdown pass to Richard Williamson. Alabama then closed the game with a six-yard Richardson touchdown run in the third and a 34-yard field goal in the fourth to win 34–0.

=== Arkansas ===
1962 Sugar Bowl

Team	1	2	3	4	Total
#9 Arkansas	0	0	3	0	3
• #1 Alabama	7	3	0	0	10

- Date: January 1, 1962
- Location: Tulane Stadium
  New Orleans
- Game attendance: 82,910

After the Crimson Tide was recognized as national champions by the major wire services, they defeated the Arkansas Razorbacks 10–3 in the 1962 edition of the Sugar Bowl in what was the first all-time meeting between the schools. The Crimson Tide took a 10–0 halftime lead after they scored on a 12-yard Pat Trammell touchdown run in the first quarter and on a 32-yard Tim Davis field goal in the second quarter. Although Alabama was held scoreless in the second half, the Razorbacks only managed to score a 23-yard Mickey Cissell field goal in the third quarter that made the final score 10–3 in favor of Alabama.

== Awards ==
After the season, several Alabama players were recognized for their on-field performances. Billy Neighbors was a unanimous selection to the 1961 College Football All-America Team at the tackle position. Second-team All-America selections included Lee Roy Jordan at center and Pat Trammell at quarterback. Additionally, Alabama had four players selected to the All-SEC First Team: Mike Fracchia at back, Jordan, Neighbors and Trammell. Trammell was also selected as the SEC Most Valuable Player for the 1961 season and Neighbors won the Jacobs Blocking Trophy. In addition, Bear Bryant was recognized as the AP, UPI and coaches' SEC Coach of the Year.

== NFL/AFL Draft ==
Several players that were varsity lettermen from the 1961 squad were drafted into the National Football League (NFL) and the American Football League (AFL) between the 1962 and 1965 drafts. These players included the following:

Year	Round	Overall	Player name	Position	NFL/AFL team
1962 NFL draft	4	43	Billy Neighbors	Tackle	Washington Redskins
1962 NFL draft	5	69	Bill Rice	End	St. Louis Cardinals
1962 NFL draft	16	211	Tommy Brooker	End	Washington Redskins
1962 NFL draft	16	219	Ray Abruzzese	Running back	Baltimore Colts
1962 AFL draft	5	39	Bill Rice	End	Houston Oilers
1962 AFL draft	6	46	Billy Neighbors	Guard	Boston Patriots
1962 AFL draft	17	131	Tommy Brooker	End	Dallas Texans
1962 AFL draft	23	180	Ray Abruzzese	Safety	Buffalo Bills
1962 AFL draft	24	187	Pat Trammell	Quarterback	Dallas Texans
1963 NFL draft	1	6	Lee Roy Jordan	Linebacker	Dallas Cowboys
1963 NFL draft	2	24	Butch Wilson	Back	Baltimore Colts
1963 NFL draft	3	33	Mike Fracchia	Back	St. Louis Cardinals
1963 AFL draft	2	14	Lee Roy Jordan	Linebacker	Boston Patriots
1963 AFL draft	6	41	Butch Wilson	Tight end	Oakland Raiders
1963 AFL draft	7	55	Richard Williamson	End	Boston Patriots
1964 NFL draft	5	61	Benny Nelson	Halfback	Detroit Lions
1964 NFL draft	11	151	Eddie Versprille	Running back	Cleveland Browns
1964 AFL draft	12	94	Benny Nelson	Defensive back	Houston Oilers

== Freshman squad ==
Prior to the 1972 NCAA University Division football season, NCAA rules prohibited freshmen from participating on the varsity team, and as such many schools fielded freshmen teams. For the 1961 season, the Alabama freshmen squad was coached by Sam Bailey and finished their season with a record of two wins and one tie (2–0–1). The 1961 freshman squad was noted for its being led by Joe Namath at quarterback after he chose to attend Alabama after he received more than 50 athletic scholarship offers from other schools.

In their first game of the season, Alabama came from behind and defeated Mississippi State 20–14 before 3,500 fans at Denny Stadium. After the Bulldogs took a 7–0 first quarter lead on a six-yard Ray Reed pass to Tommy Inman, Alabama tied the game 7–7 on an eight-yard Namath touchdown run early in the second. The Crimson Tide then took a 13–7 halftime lead on a nine-yard Namath pass to Creed Gilmer late in the second. State retook a 14–13 lead in the third on an eight-yard Reed to Inman pass, but Alabama scored the game-winning touchdown on a 36-yard Ron McKinney run that made the final score 20–13.

In their second game, the Baby Tide defeated Tulane 32–6 at Denny Stadium in a game they scored touchdowns in all four quarters. After the Green Wave scored their only points on the first play of the game when Leon Verriere recovered the fumbled kickoff in the end zone for a touchdown, Alabama responded on the next drive and tied the game 6–6 after Namath threw an 11-yard touchdown pass to Ray Ogden. The Crimson Tide then took a 12–6 lead in the second quarter on a 26-yard Tommy Tolleson double reverse. Alabama then closed the game with a pair of Namath touchdown runs and a touchdown pass to Creed Gilmer in the second half that made the final score 32–6.

In their final game of the season, Alabama tied the Auburn freshman team 7–7 before 7,000 fans in the rain at Cliff Hare Stadium. Both touchdowns came in the first quarter. Alabama took a 7–0 lead when Namath threw a 46-yard touchdown pass to Creed Gilmer, and Auburn tied the game 7–7 on the kickoff that ensued after Tucker Frederickson returned it 92-yards for a touchdown.

== Personnel ==
=== Varsity letter winners ===
Player	Number	Position	Weight	Hometown
Steve Allen	63	Guard	210	Athens, Alabama
Bill Battle	84	End	197	Birmingham, Alabama
Tom Bible	75	Tackle		Piedmont, Alabama
Tommy Brooker	81	End	212	Demopolis, Alabama
Glynn Burleson	55	Linebacker	188	Pine Hill, Alabama
James Cain		Tackle		Pensacola, Florida
Cotton Clark	45	Halfback	185	Kansas, Alabama
Elbert Cook	51	Linebacker	185	Jacksonville, Florida
Curtis Crenshaw	88	Tackle	202	Mobile, Alabama
Ingram Culwell	11	Halfback, Punter	187	Tuscaloosa, Alabama
Tim Davis	40	Placekicker	165	Columbus, Georgia
Mike Fracchia	30	Fullback	185	Memphis, Tennessee
Butch Henry	80	End	201	Selma, Alabama
Darwin Holt	32	Linebacker	174	Gainesville, Texas
Mike Hopper	86	End	178	Huntsville, Alabama
Lee Roy Jordan	54	Linebacker	202	Excel, Alabama
Al Lewis	78	Guard	219	Covington, Kentucky
Gary Martin	42	Halfback	173	Dothan, Alabama
Duff Morrison	24	Halfback	189	Memphis, Tennessee
Billy Neighbors	73	Tackle	229	Northport, Alabama
Benny Nelson	28	Halfback	173	Huntsville, Alabama
John O'Linger	52	Center	187	Scottsboro, Alabama
Bill Oliver	21	Defensive back	170	Livingston, Alabama
James Patton	82	End	182	Tuscumbia, Alabama
Charley Pell	69	Tackle	199	Albertville, Alabama
Bob Pettee	62	Guard	186	Bradenton, Florida
William Rice	70	Guard	218	Troy, Alabama
Billy Richardson	35	Halfback	172	Jasper, Alabama
Norbie Ronsonet		End		Biloxi, Mississippi
Jack Rutledge	60	Guard	198	Birmingham, Alabama
Jimmy Sharpe	61	Guard	191	Montgomery, Alabama
Pat Trammell	12	Quarterback	193	Scottsboro, Alabama
Eddie Versprille	31	Fullback	181	Norfolk, Virginia
Larry Wall	36	Fullback	179	Fairfax, Alabama
Red Wilkins	85	End	198	Bay Minette, Alabama
Richard Williamson	83	End	181	Fort Deposit, Alabama
Butch Wilson	20	Halfback	204	Hueytown, Alabama
Jimmy Wilson	64	Guard	198	Haleyville, Alabama

=== Coaching staff ===
Name	Position	Seasons at Alabama	Alma mater
Bear Bryant	Head coach	4	Alabama (1936)
Sam Bailey	Assistant coach	4	Ouachita Baptist (1949)
Charlie Bradshaw	Assistant coach	4	Kentucky (1950)
Phil Cutchin	Assistant coach	4	Kentucky (1943)
Jim Goostree	Assistant coach	5	Tennessee (1952)
Clem Gryska	Assistant coach	2	Alabama (1948)
Dude Hennessey	Assistant coach	2	Kentucky (1955)
Pat James	Assistant coach	4	Kentucky (1951)
Carney Laslie	Assistant Head coach,	4	Alabama (1934)
Hayden Riley	Assistant coach	4	Alabama (1948)
Howard Schnellenberger	Assistant coach	1	Kentucky (1956)
Gene Stallings	Assistant coach	4	Texas A&M (1957)
