= 1961 Tennessee Volunteers football team =

American college football season

1961 Tennessee Volunteers football
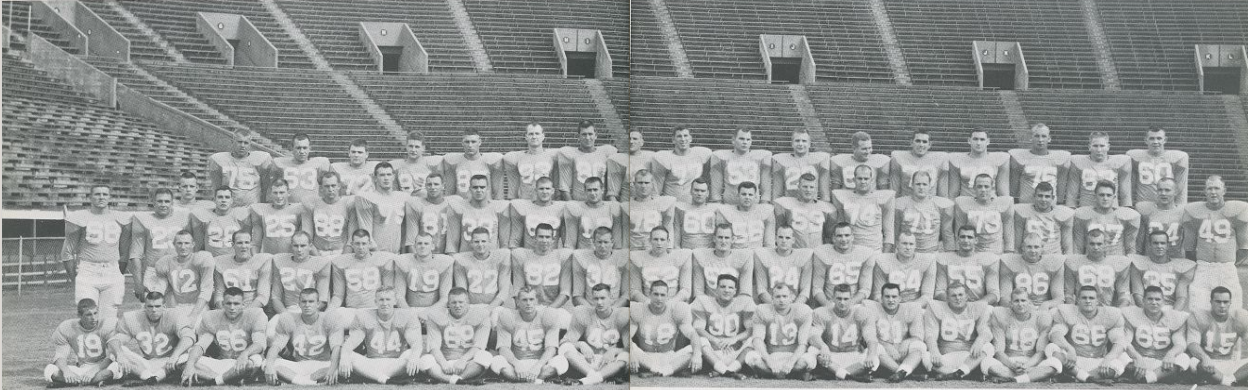
- Conference: Southeastern Conference
- Record: 6–4 (4–3 SEC)
- Head coach: Bowden Wyatt (7th season)
- Captain: Mike Lucci
- Home stadium: Shields–Watkins Field

1961 Southeastern Conference football standings
	Conf.					Overall
Team	W		L		T	W		L		T
No. 1 Alabama +	7	–	0	–	0	11	–	0	–	0
No. 4 LSU +	6	–	0	–	0	10	–	1	–	0
No. 5 Ole Miss	5	–	1	–	0	9	–	2	–	0
No. 13 Georgia Tech	4	–	3	–	0	7	–	4	–	0
Tennessee	4	–	3	–	0	6	–	4	–	0
Florida	3	–	3	–	0	4	–	5	–	1
Auburn	3	–	4	–	0	6	–	4	–	0
Kentucky	2	–	4	–	0	5	–	5	–	0
Georgia	2	–	5	–	0	3	–	7	–	0
Mississippi State	1	–	5	–	0	5	–	5	–	0
Tulane	1	–	5	–	0	2	–	8	–	0
Vanderbilt	1	–	6	–	0	2	–	8	–	0
+ – Conference co-champions; Rankings from AP Poll

The 1961 Tennessee Volunteers football team (variously "Tennessee", "UT" or the "Vols") was an American football team that represented the University of Tennessee as a member of the Southeastern Conference (SEC) during the 1961 college football season. In their seventh year under head coach Bowden Wyatt, the team compiled a 6–4 record (4–3 in conference games). tied for fourth place in the SEC, and outscored opponents by a total of 221 to 149.

Tailback Mallon Faircloth led the team in passing (460 yards), rushing (475 yards), total offense (935 yards), and scoring (36 points, six touchdowns). Center and captain Mike Lucci was the only Tennessee player to receive first-team honors on the 1961 All-SEC football team.

The team played its home games at Shields–Watkins Field in Knoxville, Tennessee.

== Schedule ==
Date	Opponent	Site	TV	Result	Attendance	Source
September 30	Auburn	Shields–Watkins Field; Knoxville, TN (rivalry)		L 21–24	44,600	
October 7	Mississippi State^{†}	Shields–Watkins Field; Knoxville, TN		W 17–3	31,600	
October 14	Tulsa*	Shields–Watkins Field; Knoxville, TN		W 52–6	23,439	
October 21	at No. 5 Alabama	Legion Field; Birmingham, AL (Third Saturday in October)	ABC	L 3–34	48,000	
October 28	Chattanooga*	Shields–Watkins Field; Knoxville, TN		W 20–7	25,000	
November 4	at North Carolina*	Kenan Memorial Stadium; Chapel Hill, NC		L 21–22	35,000	
November 11	No. 9 Georgia Tech	Shields–Watkins Field; Knoxville, TN (rivalry)		W 10–6	46,000	
November 18	vs. No. 6 Ole Miss	Crump Stadium; Memphis, TN (rivalry)		L 10–24	32,428	
November 25	at Kentucky	McLean Stadium; Lexington, KY (rivalry)		W 26–16	37,000	
December 2	Vanderbilt	Shields–Watkins Field; Knoxville, TN (rivalry)		W 41–7	29,130	
*Non-conference game; ^{†}Homecoming; Rankings from AP Poll released prior to the game

== Statistics ==
The Volunteers gained an average of 183.2 rushing yards and 62.0 passing yards per game. On defense, they gave up an average of 159.7 rushing yards and 117.6 passing yards per game.

Tailback Mallon Faircloth completed 31 of 52 passes (59.6%) for 460 yards with eight touchdowns, zero interceptions, and a 184.7 quarterback rating. He also led the team in rushing (475 yards), total offense (935 yards), and scoring (36 points, six touchdowns).

The team's leading rushers after Faircloth were Bunny Orr (332 yards, 67 carries), Glenn Glass (261 yards, 59 carries), Jack Nichols (231 yards, 53 carries), and George Canale (146 yards, 42 carries).

The team's leading receivers were Hubert McClain (11 receptions, 149 yards) and Mike Stratton (nine receptions, 142 yards).

== Awards and honors ==
Center Mike Lucci was selected as the team captain. Lucci also won first-team honors from the Associated Press (AP) on the 1961 All-SEC football team and second-team honors from the United Press International (UPI). Tailback Mallon Faircloth was named to the second team by the AP and the third team by the UPI.

Halfback Glenn Glass was drafted by the Chicago Bears in the 17th round of the 1962 NFL draft.

== Personnel ==
=== Players ===
- Pat Augustine (#84), end, junior, 6'0", 185 pounds
- Warren Blankenship (#52), center, senior, 6'0", 200 pounds
- Kenny Brown (79), tackle, junior, 6'1", 196 pounds
- George Canale (#45), tailback, junior, 5'9", 175 pounds
- J.W. Carter (#34), fullback, senior, 6'1", 190 pounds
- Wayne Coleman (#23), blocking back, junior, 5'9", 175 pounds
- Bob Dalton (#66), guard, sophomore, 6'0", 183 pounds
- Dick Evey (#75), tackle, sophomore, 6'4", 220 pounds
- Morgan Faircloth (#43), tailback, sophomore, 5'11", 182 pounds, Cordele, GA
- Buddy Fisher (#85), end, sophomore, 6'3", 190 pounds
- Joe Foxall (#63), guard, junior, 6'1", 192 pounds
- Glenn "Red" Glass (#49), tailback, senior, 6'1", 185 pounds
- L.T. Helton (#50), center, senior, 6'1", 200 pounds
- Ken Honea (#20), blocking back, 6'0", 185 pounds
- Johnny Hudson (#88), end, junior, 6'2", 201 pounds
- Paul Inglett (#65), guard, senior, 195 pounds
- Mike Lucci (#55), center, senior, 6'2", 200 pounds
- Cliff Marquart (#74), tackle, senior, 6'2", 204 pounds
- Hubert McClain (#19), wingback, sophomore, 5'11", 175 pounds
- Bobby Morton (#42), tailback, sophomore, 5'10", 161 pounds
- Jack Nichols (#33), fullback, junior, 6'0", 200 pounds
- Bunny Orr (#32), fullback, senior, 5'11", 185 pounds
- Larry Richards (#60), guard, junior, 6'2", 190 pounds
- Mike Stratton (#86), end, senior, 6'3", 205 pounds
- Paul Tilson (#76), tackle, junior, 6'1", 195 pounds
- Tom Williams (#70), tackle, junior, 6'1", 195 pounds
- Charles Wyrick (#12), wingback, junior, 6'0", 185 pounds

=== Coaches and administrators ===
- Head coach: Bowden Wyatt
- Assistant coaches: George Cafego (backfield), Ralph Chancey, Bob Woodruff, Harvey Robinson, Dale Haupt, John Mauer, Jim McDonald
- Trainer: Mickey O'Brien
- Athletic director: Robert Neyland
