= Gene Sykes =

American football player (1941–2018)

No. 23
- Position: Defensive back

Personal information
- Born: September 26, 1942; New Orleans, Louisiana, U.S.
- Died: October 26, 2018 (aged 76); Baton Rouge, Louisiana, U.S.
- Listed height: 6 ft 1 in (1.85 m)
- Listed weight: 201 lb (91 kg)

Career information
- High school: Covington (LA)
- College: LSU
- NFL draft: 1963: 8th round, 106th overall pick
- AFL draft: 1963: 19th round, 148th overall pick

Career history
- Buffalo Bills (1963–1965); Denver Broncos (1966)

Awards and highlights
- 2× AFL champion (1964, 1965)

Career AFL statistics
- Interceptions: 4
- Fumble recoveries: 1
- Stats at Pro Football Reference

Eugene Charle Sykes (September 26, 1941 – October 26, 2018) was an American football defensive back. Sykes scored a touchdown in LSU's 25–7 defeat of Colorado in the 1962 Orange Bowl. In 1963, he appeared with the LSU team in the Cotton Bowl, where they defeated Texas 13–0, and in the Hula Bowl All-Star Game.

As a professional, Sykes was drafted by the American Football League (AFL)'s Buffalo Bills, playing for them in 1963 and for their AFL Championship teams of 1964 and 1965. He finished his Professional Football career with the AFL's Denver Broncos in 1966.

== See also ==
- List of American Football League players
