= 1961 Mississippi State Bulldogs football team =

American college football season

1961 Mississippi State Bulldogs football
- Conference: Southeastern Conference
- Record: 5–5 (1–5 SEC)
- Head coach: Wade Walker (6th season)
- Home stadium: Scott Field; Mississippi Veterans Memorial Stadium

1961 Southeastern Conference football standings
	Conf.					Overall
Team	W		L		T	W		L		T
No. 1 Alabama +	7	–	0	–	0	11	–	0	–	0
No. 4 LSU +	6	–	0	–	0	10	–	1	–	0
No. 5 Ole Miss	5	–	1	–	0	9	–	2	–	0
No. 13 Georgia Tech	4	–	3	–	0	7	–	4	–	0
Tennessee	4	–	3	–	0	6	–	4	–	0
Florida	3	–	3	–	0	4	–	5	–	1
Auburn	3	–	4	–	0	6	–	4	–	0
Kentucky	2	–	4	–	0	5	–	5	–	0
Georgia	2	–	5	–	0	3	–	7	–	0
Mississippi State	1	–	5	–	0	5	–	5	–	0
Tulane	1	–	5	–	0	2	–	8	–	0
Vanderbilt	1	–	6	–	0	2	–	8	–	0
+ – Conference co-champions; Rankings from AP Poll

The 1961 Mississippi State Bulldogs football team was an American football team that represented Mississippi State University as a member of the Southeastern Conference (SEC) during the 1961 college football season. In their sixth year under head coach Wade Walker, the team compiled an overall record of 5–5, with a mark of 1–5 in conference play, and finished 10th in the SEC.

After the season, Wade Walker was fired as head coach, but continued to be the athletic director. This was the first season that Mississippi State athletic teams were known as the Bulldogs.

== Schedule ==
Date	Opponent	Site	Result	Attendance	Source
September 23	Texas Tech*	Mississippi Veterans Memorial Stadium; Jackson, MS	W 6–0	33,000	
September 30	at Houston*	Rice Stadium; Houston, TX	W 10–7	27,000	
October 7	at Tennessee	Shields–Watkins Field; Knoxville, TN	L 3–17	31,600	
October 14	Arkansas State*	Scott Field; Starkville, MS	W 38–0	20,000	
October 21	vs. Georgia	Grant Field; Atlanta, GA	L 7–10	18,000	
October 28	at Memphis State*	Crump Stadium; Memphis, TN	W 23–16	30,092	
November 4	at No. 4 Alabama	Denny Stadium; Tuscaloosa, AL (rivalry)	L 0–24	39,000	
November 11	at Auburn	Legion Field; Birmingham, AL	W 11–10	35,000	
November 18	at No. 4 LSU	Tiger Stadium; Baton Rouge, LA (rivalry)	L 6–14	58,000	
December 2	No. 5 Ole Miss	Scott Field; Starkville, MS (Egg Bowl)	L 7–37	34,500	
*Non-conference game; Rankings from AP Poll released prior to the game
