= 1961 Texas Longhorns football team =

American college football season

1961 Texas Longhorns football
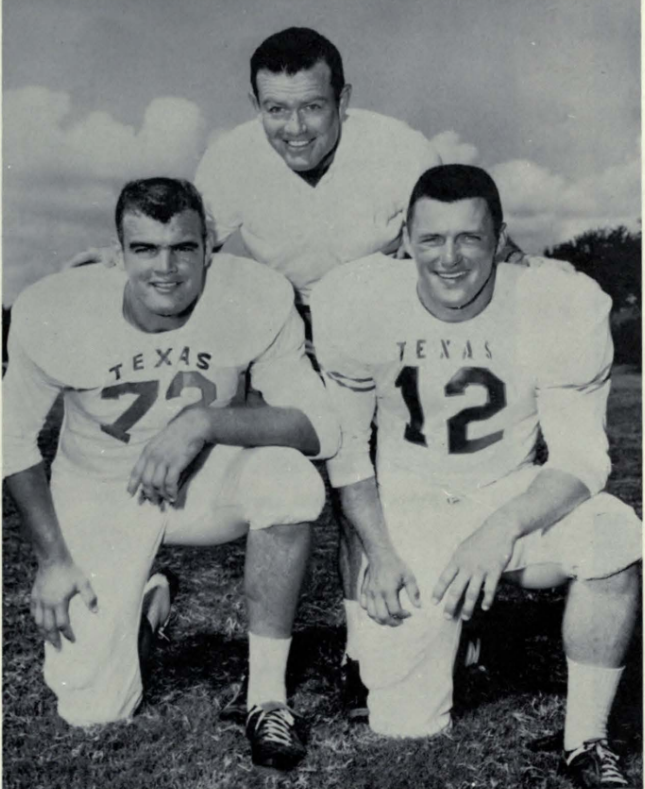
- Darrell Royal (center) with co-captains Don Talbert (left) and Mike Cotten (right)

SWC co-champion Cotton Bowl Classic champion

Cotton Bowl Classic, W 12–7 vs. Ole Miss
- Conference: Southwest Conference

Ranking
- Coaches: No. 4
- AP: No. 3
- Record: 10–1 (6–1 SWC)
- Head coach: Darrell Royal (5th season)
- Home stadium: Memorial Stadium

1961 Southwest Conference football standings
	Conf.					Overall
Team	W		L		T	W		L		T
No. 3 Texas +	6	–	1	–	0	10	–	1	–	0
No. 9 Arkansas +	6	–	1	–	0	8	–	3	–	0
Rice	5	–	2	–	0	7	–	4	–	0
Texas A&M	3	–	4	–	0	4	–	5	–	1
TCU	2	–	4	–	1	3	–	5	–	2
Baylor	2	–	5	–	0	6	–	5	–	0
Texas Tech	2	–	5	–	0	4	–	6	–	0
SMU	1	–	5	–	1	2	–	7	–	1
+ – Conference co-champions; Rankings from AP Poll

The 1961 Texas Longhorns football team was an American football team that represented the University of Texas (now known as the University of Texas at Austin) as a member of the Southwest Conference (SWC) during the 1961 college football season. In their fifth year under head coach Darrell Royal, the Longhorns compiled a 10–1 record (6–1 in conference games) and tied with Arkansas for the SWC championship. The Longhorns defeated Arkansas (33–7) and Oklahoma (28–7), and were ranked No. 1 until they lost, 6–0, to unranked TCU on November 18. At the end of the regular season, the Longhorns were ranked No. 3 in the final AP poll and No. 4 in the final UPI poll. They concluded their season with a victory over No. 5 Ole Miss in the Cotton Bowl Classic.

Texas outscored all opponents by a total of 291 to 59. They were ranked fourth nationally in total offense (383.1 yards per game) and seventh nationally in total defense (176.1 yards per game). Consensus All-American Jimmy Saxton led the team with 846 rushing yards (7.9 yards per carry) and finished third in the Heisman Trophy voting. Tackle Don Talbert also received first-team All-American honors, and Darrell Royal was selected by the Football Writers Association of America as the 1961 "Coach of the Year".

The team played its home games at Memorial Stadium in Austin, Texas.

== Schedule ==
Date	Time	Opponent	Rank	Site	TV	Result	Attendance	Source
September 23	3:30 p.m.	at California*	No. 4	California Memorial Stadium; Berkeley, CA		W 28–3	41,500	
September 30	7:30 p.m.	Texas Tech	No. 6	Memorial Stadium; Austin, TX (rivalry)		W 42–14	43,500	
October 7	7:30 p.m.	Washington State*	No. 5	Memorial Stadium; Austin, TX		W 41–8	40,000	
October 14	2:00 p.m.	vs. Oklahoma*	No. 4	Cotton Bowl; Dallas, TX (rivalry)	ABC	W 28–7	75,504	
October 21	2:00 p.m.	at No. 10 Arkansas	No. 3	Razorback Stadium; Fayetteville, AR (rivalry)		W 33–7	33,000	
October 28	7:30 p.m.	Rice	No. 3	Memorial Stadium; Austin, TX (rivalry)		W 34–7	62,310	
November 4	2:00 p.m.	at SMU	No. 3	Cotton Bowl; Dallas, TX		W 27–0	41,000	
November 11	2:00 p.m.	Baylor	No. 1	Memorial Stadium; Austin, TX (rivalry)		W 33–7	62,000	
November 18	2:00 p.m.	TCU	No. 1	Memorial Stadium; Austin, TX (rivalry)		L 0–6	50,000	
November 23	1:30 p.m.	at Texas A&M	No. 4	Kyle Field; College Station, TX (rivalry)	ABC	W 25–0	42,000	
January 1	1:30 p.m.	vs. No. 5 Ole Miss*	No. 3	Cotton Bowl; Dallas, TX (Cotton Bowl Classic)	CBS	W 12–7	75,000	
*Non-conference game; Rankings from AP Poll released prior to the game; All times are in Central time

== Game summaries ==
=== TCU ===
TCU Horned Frogs (2–5–1) at #1 Texas Longhorns (8–0)

Quarter	1	2	3	4	Total
TCU	0	6	0	0	6
Texas	0	0	0	0	0

at Memorial Stadium, Austin, Texas

- Date: November 18, 1961
- Game weather: Cloudy, 60 °F (16 °C)
- Game attendance: 50,000
- Box Score

Game information

First quarter

- No scoring

Second quarter

- TCU – Buddy Iles 50-yard pass from Sonny Gibbs (kick failed), 9:20. TCU 6–0. Drive: 8 plays, 80 yards, 3:51.

Third quarter

- No scoring

Fourth quarter

- No scoring

Top passers

- TCU
- UT – Mike Cotten – 3/6, 62 yards, INT

Top rushers

- TCU
- UT – Jimmy Saxton – 17 rushes, 85 yards

Top receivers

- TCU
- UT – Jimmy Saxton – 1 reception, 45 yards

It's not what they eat and tote off, it's what they fall into and mess up that hurts.

— Darrell Royal, postgame comparing TCU to cockroaches

== Statistics ==
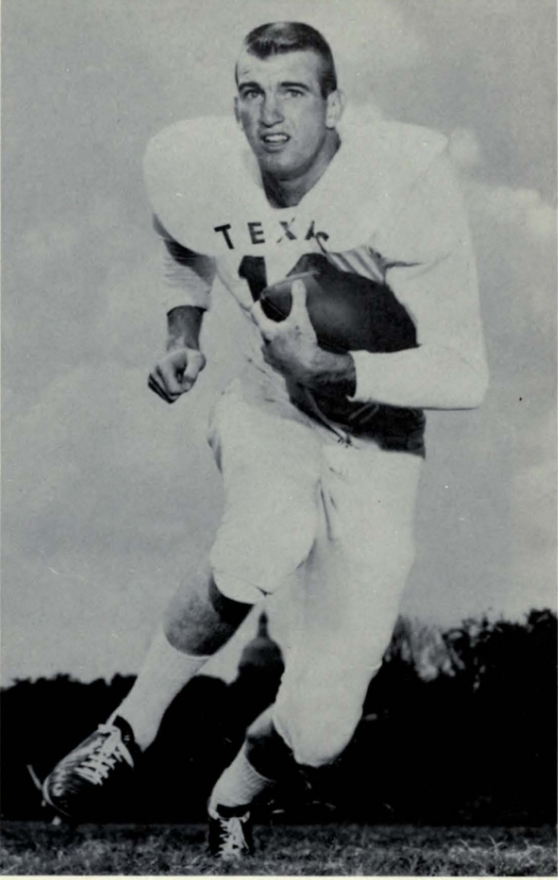
All-American halfback Jimmy Saxton

Texas ranked fourth nationally in total offense, tallying 3,821 yards in ten regular-season games, an average of 383.1 yards per game. On defense, the Longhorns ranked seventh nationally, giving up 1,761 yards, an average of 176.1 yards per game.

Texas had four of the top ten rushers in the Southwest Conference during the 1961 season. Jimmy Saxton led the conference with 846 yards on 107 carries for an average of 7.9 yards per carry. Jerry Cook ranked second in the conference with 527 yards on 96 carries (5.5-yard average). Tommy Ford ranked seventh with 415 yards on 83 carries (5.0-yard average). Ray Poage ranked ninth with 383 yards on 77 carries (5.1-yard average).

Jimmy Saxton was also the team's total offense leader. Adding 46 passing yards to his 8846 rushing yards, he finished the regular season with 892 yards of total offense.

Quarterback Mike Cotten led the Longhorns in passing, completing 44 of 77 passes (.574 completion percentage) for 500 yards with two interceptions and seven touchdown passes.

End Bob Moses was the team's leading receiver, tallying 14 catches for 177 yards (12.6 yards per catch) and five touchdowns.

== Awards and honors ==
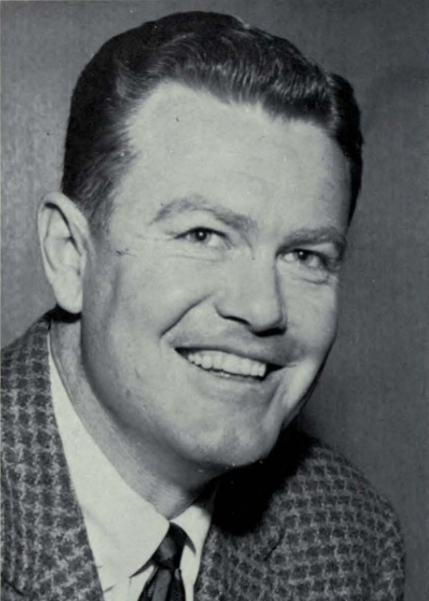
Coach of the Year Darrell Royal

Head coach Darrell Royal was selected by the Football Writers Association of America (FWAA) as the 1961 "Coach of the Year".

Halfback Jimmy Saxton received numerous honors and awards following the 1961 season, including

- Saxton was a consensus pick on the 1961 All-America college football team, having received first-team honors from the Associated Press (AP), United Press International (UPI), American Football Coaches Association, and FWAA, among others.
- Saxton finished third in the voting for the 1961 Heisman Trophy, receiving 81 first-place votes and 551 points. His total yardage (846) and average yards per carry (7.9) were both higher than the Heisman winner Ernie Davis.
- Saxton was featured on the cover of Sports Illustrated on November 27, 1961, with the headline "Football's Fanciest Runner"
- Saxton was voted by his teammates as the most valuable player on the 1961 Texas team.
- Saxton was selected by the Texas Sports Writers Association as the top amateur athlete of 1961.
- Saxton was inducted into the College Football Hall of Fame in 1996.

Tackle Don Talbert was selected by the FWAA as a first-team All-American.

Six Texas players received first-team honors from the AP or the UPI on the 1961 All-Southwest Conference football team: Saxton (AP-1, UPI-1); Talbert (AP-1, UPI-1); quarterback Mike Cotten (AP-1, UPI-1); end Bob Moses (AP-1, UPI-1); guard Johnny Treadwell (AP-1, UPI-2); and center David Kristynik (UPI-1). Fullback Ray Poage received second-team honors from the UPI.

Mike Cotten and Bob Moses were named the most valuable players of the Cotton Bowl.

== Personnel ==
=== Players ===
The following 37 players received varsity letters for their roles on the 1961 Texas team:

- Scott Appleton (#70), tackle, sophomore
- George Bass (#68), guard, sophomore
- Clarence V. Bray (#53), sophomore
- George Brucks (#66), guard, sophomore
- Duke Carlisle (#11), quarterback, sophomore
- Jack Collins (#49), wingback, senior, 195 pounds
- Jerry Cook (#38), junior
- John Allen Cook (#38), junior
- Mike Cotten (#12), quarterback and co-captain, senior, 189 pounds
- Pat Culpepper (#31), linebacker, junior
- Staley Faulkner (#77), tackle, sophomore
- Ken Ferguson (#78), tackle, sophomore
- Tommy Ford (#24), sophomore, fullback, 185 pounds
- Bobby Gamblin (#65), guard, sophomore
- Johnny Genung (#14), quarterback, junior
- Deene Gott (#87), end, senior
- James Hejl, center, senior
- Ben House (#83), end, sophomore
- David Kristynik (#64), center, senior, 203 pounds
- Marvin Kubin (#55), guard, junior, 198 pounds
- Tommy Ray Lucas (#80), end, junior, 195 pounds
- David McWilliams (#50), center/linebacker, sophomore
- Perry McWilliams (#61), center, junior
- Eldon Moritz (#23), kicking specialist, senior
- Bob Moses (#88), end, senior, 195 pounds
- Bobby Nunis (#36), wingback, junior
- Derrell M. Oliver (#25), fullback, sophomore
- Eddie Padgett (#74), tackle, senior, 205 pounds
- Ray Poage (#33), fullback, junior, 201 pounds
- Gordon Roberts (#76), tackle, sophomore
- David Russell (#40), wingback, senior
- Walter Cayce Sands (#85), end, sophomore
- Jimmy Saxton (#10), halfback, senior, 5'11", 164 pounds
- Charles Talbert (#89), end, sophomore
- Don Talbert (#72), tackle and co-captain, senior, 220 pounds
- Johnny Treadwell (#60), guard, junior, 200 pounds
- Tommy York (#84), end, junior

=== Coaches and administration ===
- Head coach - Darrell Royal
- Assistant coaches - James "T" Jones, Mike Campbell, Bill Ellington, Charles Shira, Bob Schulze, Jim Pittman, Russell Coffee
- Athletic director - Edwin Werner Cole
- Chairman, Athletic Council - Myron Louis Begeman
- Trainer - Frank Edwin Medina

=== Gallery ===
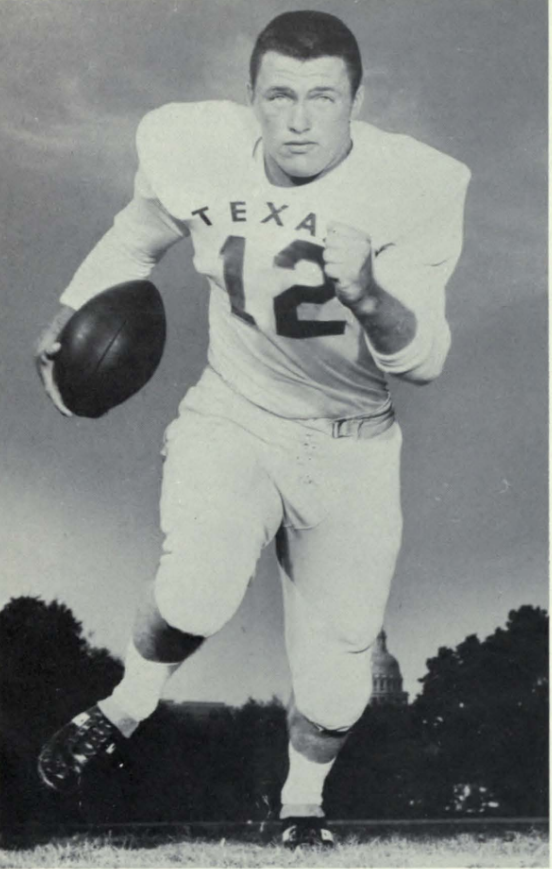
Quarterback and captain Mike Cotten

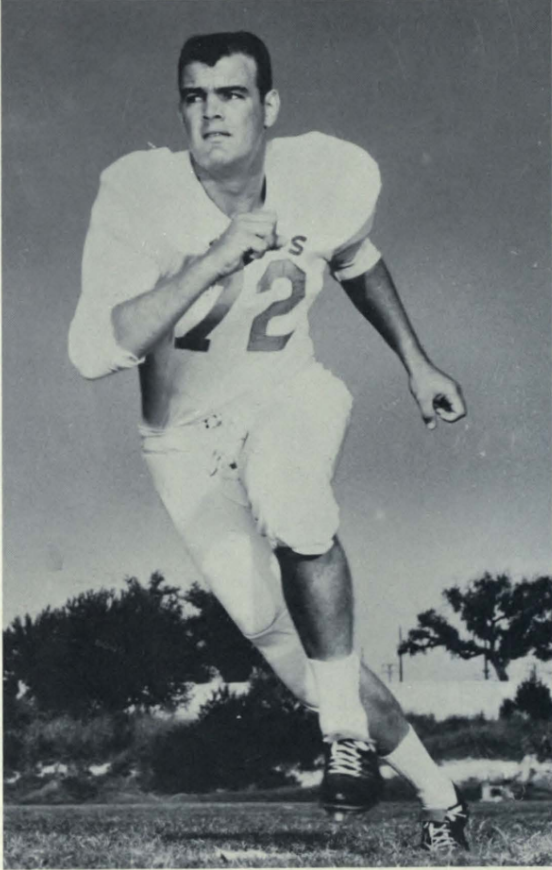
All-American tackle and captain Don Talbert

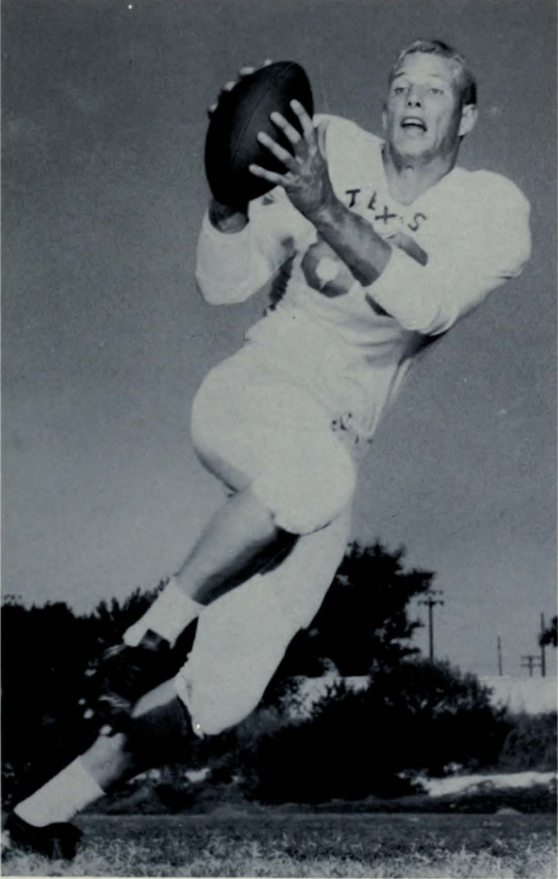
All-SWC end Bob Moses

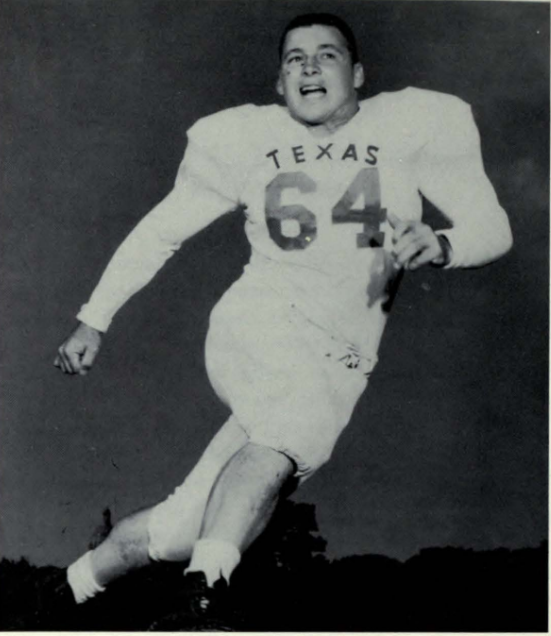
All-SWC center David Kristynik

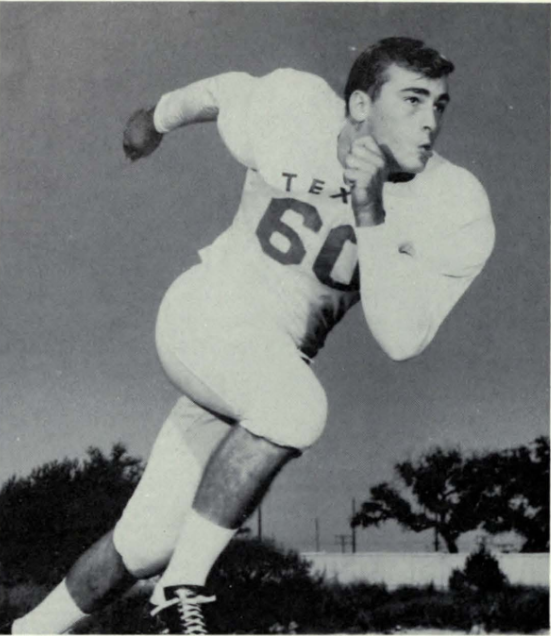
All-SWC guard Johnny Treadwell

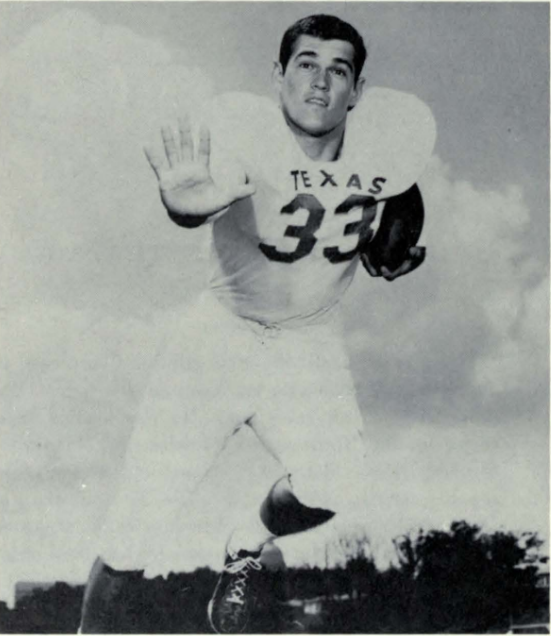
All-SWC fullback Ray Poage

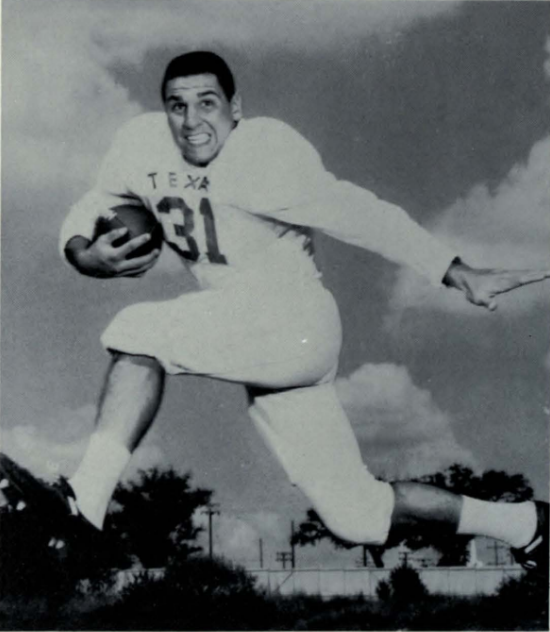
Linebacker Pat Culpepper

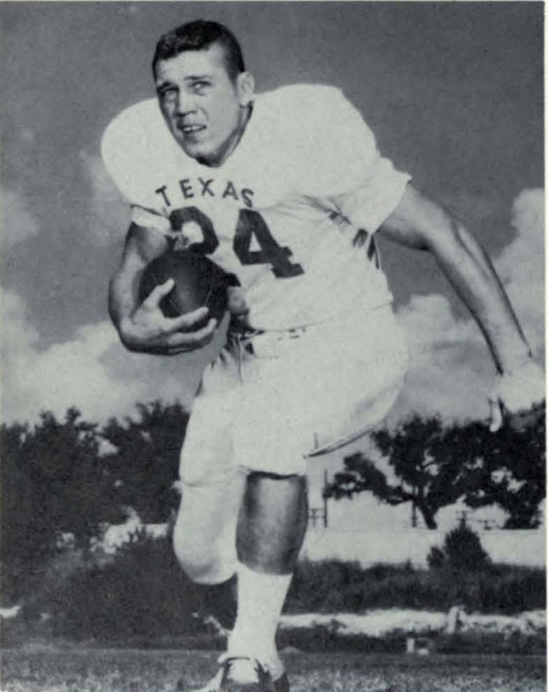
Back Tommy Ford

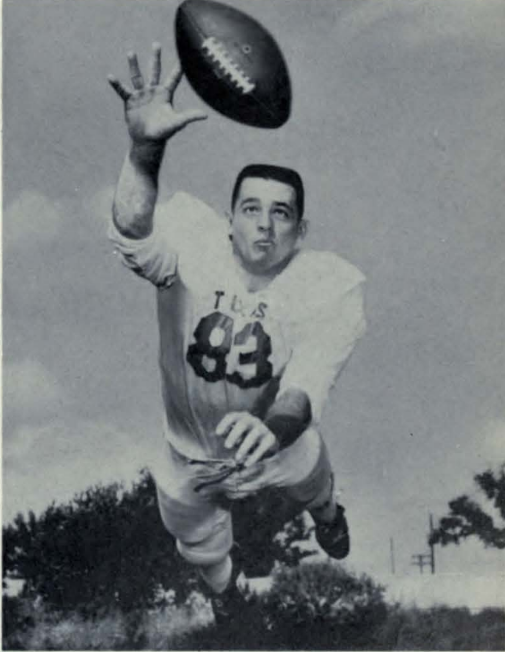
End Ben House
