= 1961 TCU Horned Frogs football team =

American college football season

1961 TCU Horned Frogs football
- Conference: Southwest Conference
- Record: 3–5–2 (2–4–1 SWC)
- Head coach: Abe Martin (9th season)
- Offensive scheme: Meyer spread
- Home stadium: Amon G. Carter Stadium

1961 Southwest Conference football standings
	Conf.					Overall
Team	W		L		T	W		L		T
No. 3 Texas +	6	–	1	–	0	10	–	1	–	0
No. 9 Arkansas +	6	–	1	–	0	8	–	3	–	0
Rice	5	–	2	–	0	7	–	4	–	0
Texas A&M	3	–	4	–	0	4	–	5	–	1
TCU	2	–	4	–	1	3	–	5	–	2
Baylor	2	–	5	–	0	6	–	5	–	0
Texas Tech	2	–	5	–	0	4	–	6	–	0
SMU	1	–	5	–	1	2	–	7	–	1
+ – Conference co-champions; Rankings from AP Poll

The 1961 TCU Horned Frogs football team was an American football team that represented Texas Christian University (TCU) as a member of the Southwest Conference (SWC) during the 1961 college football season. In their ninth year under head coach Abe Martin, the Horned Frogs compiled a 3–5–2 (2–4–1 in conference games), finished in fifth place in the SWC, and were outscored by a total of 194 to 113.

The team's statistical leaders included Sonny Gibbs (999 passing yards), Tommy Joe Crutcher (577 rushing yards), and Buddy Iles (479 receiving yards).

The Frogs played their home games in Amon G. Carter Stadium, which is located on TCU's campus in Fort Worth, Texas.

== Schedule ==
Date	Time	Opponent	Site	Result	Attendance	Source
September 23		No. 8 Kansas*	Amon G. Carter Stadium; Fort Worth, TX	W 17–16	27,000	
September 30	1:30 p.m.	at No. 3 Ohio State*	Ohio Stadium; Columbus, OH	T 7–7	82,878	
October 7		at Arkansas	War Memorial Stadium; Little Rock, AR	L 3–28	40,000	
October 14		at Texas Tech	Jones Stadium; Lubbock, TX (rivalry)	L 0–10	25,500	
October 21		Texas A&M	Amon G. Carter Stadium; Fort Worth, TX (rivalry)	W 15–14	43,000	
November 4		Baylor	Baylor Stadium; Waco, TX (rivalry)	L 14–28	23,000	
November 10		at UCLA*	Los Angeles Memorial Coliseum; Los Angeles, CA	L 7–28	29,236	
November 18	2:00 p.m.	at No. 1 Texas	Memorial Stadium; Austin, TX (rivalry)	W 6–0	50,000	
November 25		Rice	Amon G. Carter Stadium; Fort Worth, TX	L 16–35	22,000	
December 2		SMU	Amon G. Carter Stadium; Fort Worth, TX (rivalry)	T 28–28	20,000	
*Non-conference game; Rankings from AP Poll released prior to the game; All times are in Central time

== Game summaries ==
=== At Texas ===
TCU Horned Frogs (2–5–1) at #1 Texas Longhorns (8–0)

Quarter	1	2	3	4	Total
TCU	0	6	0	0	6
Texas	0	0	0	0	0

at Memorial Stadium, Austin, Texas

- Date: November 18, 1961
- Game weather: Cloudy, 60 °F (16 °C)
- Game attendance: 50,000
- Box Score

Game information

First quarter

- No scoring

Second quarter

- TCU – Buddy Iles 50-yard pass from Sonny Gibbs (kick failed), 9:20. TCU 6–0. Drive: 8 plays, 80 yards, 3:51.

Third quarter

- No scoring

Fourth quarter

- No scoring

Top passers

- TCU
- UT – Mike Cotten – 3/6, 62 yards, INT

Top rushers

- TCU
- UT – Jimmy Saxton – 17 rushes, 85 yards

Top receivers

- TCU
- UT – Jimmy Saxton – 1 reception, 45 yards

== Personnel ==
1961 TCU Horned Frogs football team roster
Players
Coaches
Offense

Pos.	#	Name	Class
OL		Bobby Biehunko
RB		Marv Chipman
RB		Tommy Joe Crutcher
RB		Roy Dent
QB		Sonny Gibbs
WR		Dale Glasscock
WR		Pete Hill
WR		Buddy Iles
OL		Don Jackson
WR		Tom Magoffin
QB		Gray Mills
RB		Lloyd Mynatt
OL		Bill Phillips
OL		Ray Pinion
OL		Bobby Plummer
WR		Ben Nix
OL		Don Smith
RB		Donny Smith
WR		Garry Thomas
WR		Larry Thomas

Defense

Pos.	#	Name	Class

Special teams

Pos.	#	Name	Class

Head coach

- Abe Martin

Coordinators/assistant coaches

Legend

- (C) Team captain
- (S) Suspended
- (I) Ineligible
- Injured
- Redshirt
