= Pat Culpepper =

American football player and coach (born September 19, 1941)

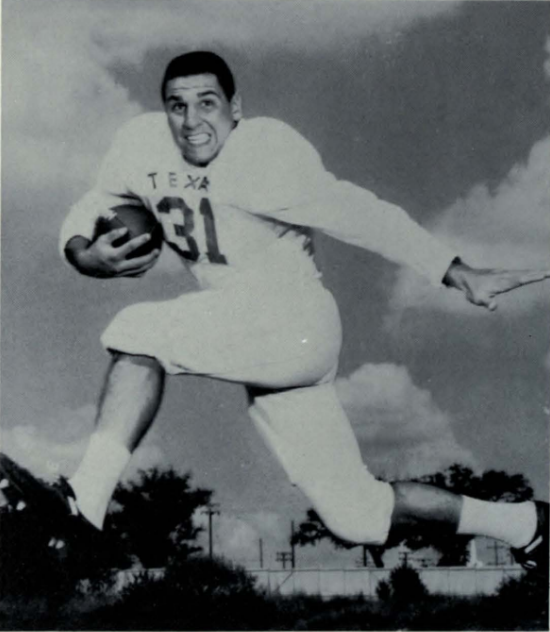
- Culpepper Yearbook Photo 1961

Biographical details
- Born: (September 19, 1941); Cleburne, TX
- Education: The University of Texas

Playing career
- 1960–1962: Texas
- Positions: Linebacker, fullback

Coaching career (HC unless noted)
- 1963–1964: Texas (Freshmen and linebackers)
- 1965: Colorado (assistant)
- 1966-1967: Tulane (assistant)
- 1968: Colorado (Linebackers)
- 1969-1973: Baylor (DC)
- 1974: Memphis State (DC)
- 1975: Northern Illinois (DC)
- 1976-1979: Northern Illinois
- 1980–1983: Midland HS (TX)
- 1984–1991: Lufkin HS (TX)
- 1992: Galveston Ball High School
- 1993: Westfield High School
- 1994-1995: Cleburne High School

Head coaching record
- Overall: 14–29–1 (college)

Accomplishments and honors

Awards
- As a player: Nils V. "Swede" Nelson Award (1962); 1962 Academic All-American; 1962 NFF Scholar-Athlete; Southwest Conference Champion - (1961, 1962); 1962 Cotton Bowl Champion; 1960 Bluebonnet Bowl Co-champion; As a coach: 1963 National Champion - Assistant coach

John Patrick Culpepper Jr. (born 1941) is an American former football player and coach. He served as the head football coach at Northern Illinois University from 1976 to 1979, compiling a record of 14–29–1. He was an Academic All-American in college and won a National Championship as an assistant coach at Texas in 1963.

== Early life ==
Culpepper was a native of Johnson County, Texas where he played football at Cleburne High School with another Longhorn player and coach - David McWilliams. Culpepper was the co-captain of the Cleburne Yellow Jackets team that reached the state semifinals - after a 40 years of not making the playoffs at all. He also played center field for the State Semi-Finalist baseball team.

== Player ==
Culpepper was a linebacker and fullback for the Texas Longhorns from 1960 to 1962.

in 1959 he played on the freshman team, the Shorthorns, that went 4-0-1. Against Rice he was responsible for all of the scoring as he had a 78-yard pick six, rushed for another TD and threw the 2-point conversion pass.

In 1960 he played in 10 games, with 71 tackles and a 78-yard interception for a TD against Oklahoma on defense and carried the ball 15 times for 46 yards on offense. His pick-six against Oklahoma was the 3rd longest in school history at the time. He helped the Longhorns go to the 1960 Bluebonnet Bowl game against Alabama, which they tied.

In 1961, he played in 9 games, recording 53 tackles, a forced fumble, a fumble recovery and, against Texas A&M, a 19 yard interception return on defense while also carrying the ball once for 2 yards. He helped the Longhorns to the Southwest Conference championship and he helped them wi the Cotton Bowl with a 13-yard carry and tough defensive play. He was selected to the Dallas News' all SWC team as the wildcard player, made ABC-TV's All-American team for his defensive play against Texas A&M and was an honorable mention All-SWC selection by the UPI. He was also named to the Academic All-SWC Team and was a second team Academic All-American.

Culpepper was a team co-captain as a senior. He played in 9 games, recording 72 tackles, a forced fumble and 2 blocked passes on defense while carrying the ball 16 times for 72 yards and a touchdown. He is best remembered for his hit (along with Johnny Treadwell) on Arkansas' Danny Brabham in 1962 that forced a fumble at the goal line and spurred the Longhorns to a 7–3 victory and the SWC title. In addition to helping his team repeat as SWC champions and go to the Cotton Bowl again, he earned Second-team All-Southwest Conference honors.

He continued to receive honors for his off-the-field exploits as well. He became the only Longhorn to win the Nils V. "Swede" Nelson Award which is awarded to "the player who by his conduct on and off the gridiron demonstrates a high esteem for the football code and exemplifies sportsmanship to an outstanding degree." He made the Academic All-SWC team and the Academic All-American Team and was named a National Football Foundation/Earl Blaik Scholar-Athlete award winner. He graduated with a B.A. with honors in history.

In 1991, he was inducted into the Longhorn Hall of Honor.

== Coaching career ==
=== College ===
After college he had planned to go to law school, but Coach Royal convinced him to stay on as a coach of linebackers and the freshman team. He stayed with the Longhorns for 2 years as an assistant coach, giving up a Marine Corps commission to do so, and helped them win the 1963 National Championship.

He spent the next 11 years on the coaching staffs at Colorado, Tulane, Baylor, Memphis State, and Northern Illinois. He moved to Colorado in 1965 where he was an assistant coach and the next year he went to Tulane. He went back to Colorado in 1968 and coached linebackers, and in 1969 he moved to Baylor where he was the Defensive Coordinator until 1974 when he took the same job at Memphis state. In 1975 he was hired as the defensive coordinator at Northern Illinois.

In 1976 he was promoted to head coach at Northern Illinois, and stayed in that position until 1979. He led the team to better finishes in the Mid-American Conference every year, going from last in 1976 to 6th in 1979, but after a 4th non-winning season he was fired in December 1979.

=== High School ===
He returned to Texas to coach high school football at Midland where he went 17-22 over 4 seasons and earned more money than at Northern Illinois. From Midland he moved on to Lufkin where he compiled a 49-29-7 over 8 years, and led Lufkin to the playoffs twice including the Regional Semifinals in 1988. He coached a season at Galveston Ball, where he led the team to a 9-3 record and the Area Championships in the playoffs, but was reprimanded for using ineligible players in spring training, and a season at Spring Westfield where he resigned after one season when the school was forced to forfeit 4 games for using an ineligible player. He then returned to his alma mater at Cleburne, where he coached and taught history until his retirement.

He was inducted into the Texas High School Football Hall of Fame in 2011 and the Cleburne Wall of Honor in 2025.

== Head coaching record ==
Year	Team	Overall	Conference	Standing	Bowl/playoffs
Northern Illinois Huskies (Mid-American Conference) (1976–1979)
1976	Northern Illinois	1–10	0–6	10th	
1977	Northern Illinois	3–8	2–5	8th	
1978	Northern Illinois	5–6	2–4	7th	
1979	Northern Illinois	5–5–1	3–3–1	T–4th	
Northern Illinois:		14–29–1	7–18–1		
Total:		14–29–1			
