= 1961 Arkansas Razorbacks football team =

American college football season

1961 Arkansas Razorbacks football

SWC co-champion

Sugar Bowl, L 3–10 vs. Alabama
- Conference: Southwest Conference

Ranking
- Coaches: No. 8
- AP: No. 9
- Record: 8–3 (6–1 SWC)
- Head coach: Frank Broyles (4th season)
- Captains: John Childress; Harold Horton; George McKinney
- Home stadium: Razorback Stadium; War Memorial Stadium

1961 Southwest Conference football standings
	Conf.					Overall
Team	W		L		T	W		L		T
No. 3 Texas +	6	–	1	–	0	10	–	1	–	0
No. 9 Arkansas +	6	–	1	–	0	8	–	3	–	0
Rice	5	–	2	–	0	7	–	4	–	0
Texas A&M	3	–	4	–	0	4	–	5	–	1
TCU	2	–	4	–	1	3	–	5	–	2
Baylor	2	–	5	–	0	6	–	5	–	0
Texas Tech	2	–	5	–	0	4	–	6	–	0
SMU	1	–	5	–	1	2	–	7	–	1
+ – Conference co-champions; Rankings from AP Poll

The 1961 Arkansas Razorbacks football team was an American football team that represented the University of Arkansas in the Southwest Conference (SWC) during the 1961 college football season. In their fourth year under head coach Frank Broyles, the Razorbacks compiled an 8–3 record (6–1 in conference games), finished in a tie with Texas for the SWC championship, and outscored opponents by a total of 183 to 97. The Razorbacks' only losses during the regular season came against Ole Miss by a 16–0 score and to Texas by a 33–7 score. The team was ranked No. 9 in the final Associated Press (AP) writers poll and No. 8 in the final United Press International (UPI) coaches poll and went on to lose to the undefeated national champion Alabama in the 1962 Sugar Bowl by a 10–3 score.

Arkansas halfback Lance Alworth was selected by the Football Writers Association of America as a first-team player on the 1961 College Football All-America Team. He was also honored as a second-team All-American by the Associated Press and UPI. Alworth was later inducted into both the College Football Hall of Fame and Pro Football Hall of Fame.

== Schedule ==
Date	Opponent	Rank	Site	TV	Result	Attendance	Source
September 23	at No. 9 Ole Miss*		Memorial Stadium; Jackson, MS (rivalry)	ABC	L 0–16	46,000	
September 30	Tulsa*		Razorback Stadium; Fayetteville, AR		W 6–0	18,000	
October 7	TCU		War Memorial Stadium; Little Rock, AR		W 28–3	40,000	
October 14	at No. 9 Baylor		Baylor Stadium; Waco, TX		W 23–13	34,000	
October 21	No. 3 Texas	No. 10	Razorback Stadium; Fayetteville, AR (rivalry)		L 7–33	33,000	
October 28	No. T–7 (small) Northwestern State*		War Memorial Stadium; Little Rock, AR		W 42–7	31,500	
November 4	Texas A&M		Razorback Stadium; Fayetteville, AR (rivalry)		W 15–8		
November 11	at Rice		Rice Stadium; Houston, TX		W 10–0	43,000	
November 18	at SMU		Cotton Bowl; Dallas, TX		W 21–7	17,000	
November 25	Texas Tech*	No. 9	War Memorial Stadium; Little Rock, AR (rivalry)		W 28-0	41,000	
January 1	vs. No. 1 Alabama*	No. 9	Tulane Stadium; New Orleans, LA (Sugar Bowl)	NBC	L 3–10	82,910	
*Non-conference game; Rankings from AP Poll released prior to the game

== Awards ==
Lance Alworth was the only Arkansas player to receive first-team honors on the 1961 All-America football team. He received the honor from the Football Writers Association of America (FWAA) for Look magazine. He was named to the second team by the Associated Press (AP) and United Press International (UPI).

Firve Arkansas players were recognized by the AP or UPI on the 1961 All-Southwest Conference football team: Lance Alworth (AP-1, UPI-1); guard Dean Garrett (AP-1, UPI-1); end Jim Collier (AP-2, UPI-1); back George McKinney (AP_2); and tackle John Childress (AP-2).

== Statistics ==
The team's rushing leaders were Lance Alworth (531 yards, 110 carries); Paul Dudley (364 yards, 77 carries); Billy Joe Moody (298 yards, 81 carries); Jesse Branch (286 yards, 69 carries); George McKinney (284 yards, 68 carries); and Billy Moore (252 yards, 62 carries).

The passing leaders were George McKinney (32 of 68 for 426 yards with six touchdowns and five interceptions); and Billy Moore (14 of 35 for 231 yards with two touchdowns and five interceptions).

The team's receiving leaders were Alworth (18 catches, 320 yards); Jimmy Collier (10 catches, 139 yards); and Paul Dudley (seven catches, 121 yards).

The scoring leaders were Alworth (30 points); George McKinney (24 points); Paul Dudley (24 points); and Billy Moore (18 points).

== Personnel ==
=== Players ===
- Lance Alworth, halfback, 6'0", 178 pounds
- Danny Brabham, guard, 6'4", 210 pounds
- Jesse Branch, fullback, 5'11", 190 pounds
- Mickey Cissell, fullback, 6'2", 194 pounds
- Billy Clay, tackle, 6'3", 206 pounds
- Jim Collier, end, 6'1", 187 pounds
- Paul Dudley, halfback
- Hoover Evans, end, 6'1", 195 pounds
- Dean Garrett, guard, 6'0", 200 pounds
- Harold Horton, halfback, 5'8", 160 pounds
- Jim John, end, 6'0", 190 pounds
- Tim Langston, end, 6'1", 185 pounds
- Jerry Lineberger, center, 6'0", 194 pounds
- Jerry Mazzanti, tackle, 6'2", 200 pounds
- George McKinney, quarterback, 5'11", 185 pounds
- Freddy Melder, halfbacks, 5'8", 170 pounds
- Billy Jay Moody, fullback, 6'1" 195 pounds
- Billy Moore, quarterback, 5'10", 175 pounds
- Charlie Moore, guard, 6'5", 212 pounds
- Ray Trail, guard, 5'11", 208 pounds
- Darrell Williams, halfback, 5'11", 170 pounds
- Jim Worthington, fullback, 6'1", 192 pounds

=== Staff ===
- Frank Broyles, head coach
- John H. Barnhill, athletic director
- George Cole, assistant athletic director
- Dixie B. White (offensive line)
- Hayden Fry (offensive backfield)
- Steed White (offensive ends)
- Jim Mackenzie (defensive line)
- Wilson Matthews (defensive backfield)
- Douglas Dickey (pass defense)
- Jim Davis (freshmen)
- C. A. (Ab) Bidwell (T-Team)
- Bill Ferrell (trainer)
