= Lee Roy Caffey =

American football player (1941–1994)

No. 34, 60, 50
- Position: Linebacker

Personal information
- Born: June 3, 1941; Thorndale, Texas, U.S.
- Died: January 18, 1994 (aged 52); Houston, Texas, U.S.
- Listed height: 6 ft 3 in (1.91 m)
- Listed weight: 247 lb (112 kg)

Career information
- High school: Thorndale
- College: Texas A&M
- NFL draft: 1963: 7th round, 88th overall pick
- AFL draft: 1963: 4th round, 25th overall pick

Career history
- Philadelphia Eagles (1963); Green Bay Packers (1964–1969); Chicago Bears (1970); Dallas Cowboys (1971); San Diego Chargers (1972)

Awards and highlights
- 3× Super Bowl champion (1966, 1967, 1971); 3× NFL champion (1965–1967); First-team All-Pro (1966); Pro Bowl (1965); NFL All-rookie team (1963); Green Bay Packers Hall of Fame; Green Bay Packers 75th Anniversary All Time Team; Texas A&M Hall Of Fame; Texas A&M All Decade Team (1960s)

Career NFL statistics
- Interceptions: 11
- Fumble recoveries: 11
- Total touchdowns: 3
- Sacks: 17
- Stats at Pro Football Reference

Lee Roy Caffey (June 3, 1941 – January 18, 1994) was an American professional football player who was an outside linebacker in the National Football League (NFL) for the Philadelphia Eagles, Green Bay Packers, Chicago Bears, Dallas Cowboys and San Diego Chargers. Caffey is one of the top 100 Green Bay Packers of All-Time. Caffey and teammates, Ray Nitschke and Dave Robinson, were named one of the top 10 best linebacking trios in the history of the NFL by ESPN. He played college football for the Texas A&M Aggies.

== Early life ==
Born and raised in Texas, Caffey started his football career in Thorndale at the age of ten, when he played on a pee wee league that played a team from Oklahoma in the 'Milk Bowl Championship' and shook hands with American legend, Pro Football Hall of Fame member and Olympic gold medalist Jim Thorpe.

At Thorndale High School, Caffey won the state title in the high jump and was all-state in basketball as a senior in 1959. He broke his collarbone in football his senior year and was out most of the season. He was recruited to play college basketball by Shelby Metcalfe at Texas A&M but decided to try out for the football team when he got there, earning a scholarship and was a 3-year letterman.

== College career ==
Caffey accepted a football scholarship from Texas A&M University, where he played both sides of the ball and led the Aggies in rushing as a fullback in his junior season of 1961. Defensively, the Aggies had 11 games where they allowed just 7 points or less and in 3 years gave up an average of 12 points.

Following his senior season in 1962, Caffey played in the 1963 Challenge Bowl and on the College All-Star team, which beat the two-time defending champion Green Bay Packers 20−17 in early August, prompting head coach and general manager Vince Lombardi to trade for him the next season. According to Caffey, Lombardi personally called him and said “you’re going to be my linebacker”.

Caffey was a three-year letterman and is a member of the Texas A&M Hall of Fame, and a member of the Texas A&M All-Decade Team of the 1960s. He was the first Texas A&M Aggie to play in a Super Bowl and is considered one of Texas A&M's top 10 best players in the NFL. Caffey wore #34 during his college years.

In 1993, he was inducted into the Texas A&M Athletic Hall of Fame.

== Professional career ==
=== Philadelphia Eagles ===
Caffey was selected by the Philadelphia Eagles in the seventh round (88th overall) of the 1963 NFL draft. He was also an AFL fourth round draft choice (25th overall) of the Houston Oilers. He started 6 out of 14 games and was named to the NFL All Rookie team. He returned an interception 87 yards for a touchdown against the New York Giants. Caffey wore #34 as an Eagle.

=== Green Bay Packers ===
On May 5, 1964, Caffey was acquired by the Green Bay Packers in the famous Jim Ringo trade and played under head coach Vince Lombardi. He started in 11 games his first year with Green Bay, during his six years with the team he would start in 80 of a possible 84 regular season games, and would become an All-Pro Player. At 6 ft 3 in (1.91 m) with 10.0 speed in the 100 yards (91 m), he was one of the fastest linebackers in the league, and was versatile enough to play both the outside or middle position. Caffey intercepted nine passes, returning two for touchdowns, most notably one for 52 yards against Johnny Unitas and the Baltimore Colts in the 1966 season opener at Milwaukee.

He played on the unprecedented three consecutive championship teams at Green Bay, which include the 1965 NFL championship, Super Bowl I, where he led the team with 7 tackles, and Super Bowl II. Caffey played in the legendary Ice Bowl in 1967 and was a crucial factor in the outcome of that championship. He is credited with making 3 tackles for a loss, forcing a fumble, and accounted for the Packers' only sack by dumping Don Meredith for a 9-yard loss; then spilling running backs Dan Reeves and Craig Baynham for 4- and 3-yard losses.

Caffey was named AP and UPI All-Pro in 1966. Caffey was selected to the Pro Bowl following the 1965 season. In 2006, Caffey and fellow linebackers Dave Robinson and Ray Nitschke were named one of the top 10 best linebacking trios in the history of the NFL. Caffey wore #60 as a Packer.

=== Chicago Bears ===
On January 21, 1970, after Lombardi's departure from Green Bay, Caffey, Elijah Pitts, and Bob Hyland were traded to the Chicago Bears for the second overall pick in the 1970 NFL draft (#2-Mike McCoy). Caffey would start all 14 games as outside linebacker for the Bears, beside Hall of Famer Dick Butkus, in the 1970 season under Head Coach Jim Dooley. Caffey wore #60 as a Bear.

=== Dallas Cowboys ===
On September 21, 1971, Caffey was acquired by the Dallas Cowboys in a trade for a seventh round draft choice (#182-Jim Osborne) and played in 6 games as a Cowboy. After acquiring several other former Packers, Head Coach Tom Landry called Caffey his ‘insurance policy’. He was also a player mentor for the franchise's first championship team (Super Bowl VI) under Tom Landry, where Caffey received his third career Super Bowl ring and fourth NFL championship ring. Caffey wore #60 as a Cowboy.

=== San Diego Chargers ===
In September 1972 he joined the San Diego Chargers and appeared in 12 games with 9 starts. Caffey was set to be traded to the Pittsburgh Steelers who were rebuilding their team and wanted him at linebacker alongside future Hall of Famer Jack Ham, when he decided to announce his retirement. Caffey wore #50 as a Charger.

== Legacy ==
Caffey is considered one of the most underrated linebackers in the NFL and gave very few interviews. He is a member of the Green Bay Packers Hall of Fame and was selected to the 75th Anniversary All Time Packer Team. He ranks #57 on the Top 100 Green Bay Packers of All-Time, was selected to the Texas High School All Super Bowl Team, and was nominated for ESPN's All Time Super Bowl Team.

In 2006, the Green Bay Packers' linebacking corps of Ray Nitschke, Dave Robinson, and Lee Roy Caffey were named one of the NFL's Top 10 Greatest Linebacking Trios in the history of the NFL.

== Personal life ==
In early 1994 at age 52, Caffey lost a lengthy battle with colon cancer at MD Anderson Cancer Hospital in Houston. He is buried in Milam County at Salty Cemetery, southeast of his hometown, Thorndale, and many former teammates attended his funeral. Some of the pall bearers included former NFL greats Jerry Kramer, Boyd Dowler, Donny Anderson, Tommy Joe Crutcher, Forrest Gregg, and Don and Diron Talbert. He was survived by his wife of 33 years, Dana, two daughters, and a son.
