= 1961 Rice Owls football team =

American college football season

1961 Rice Owls football
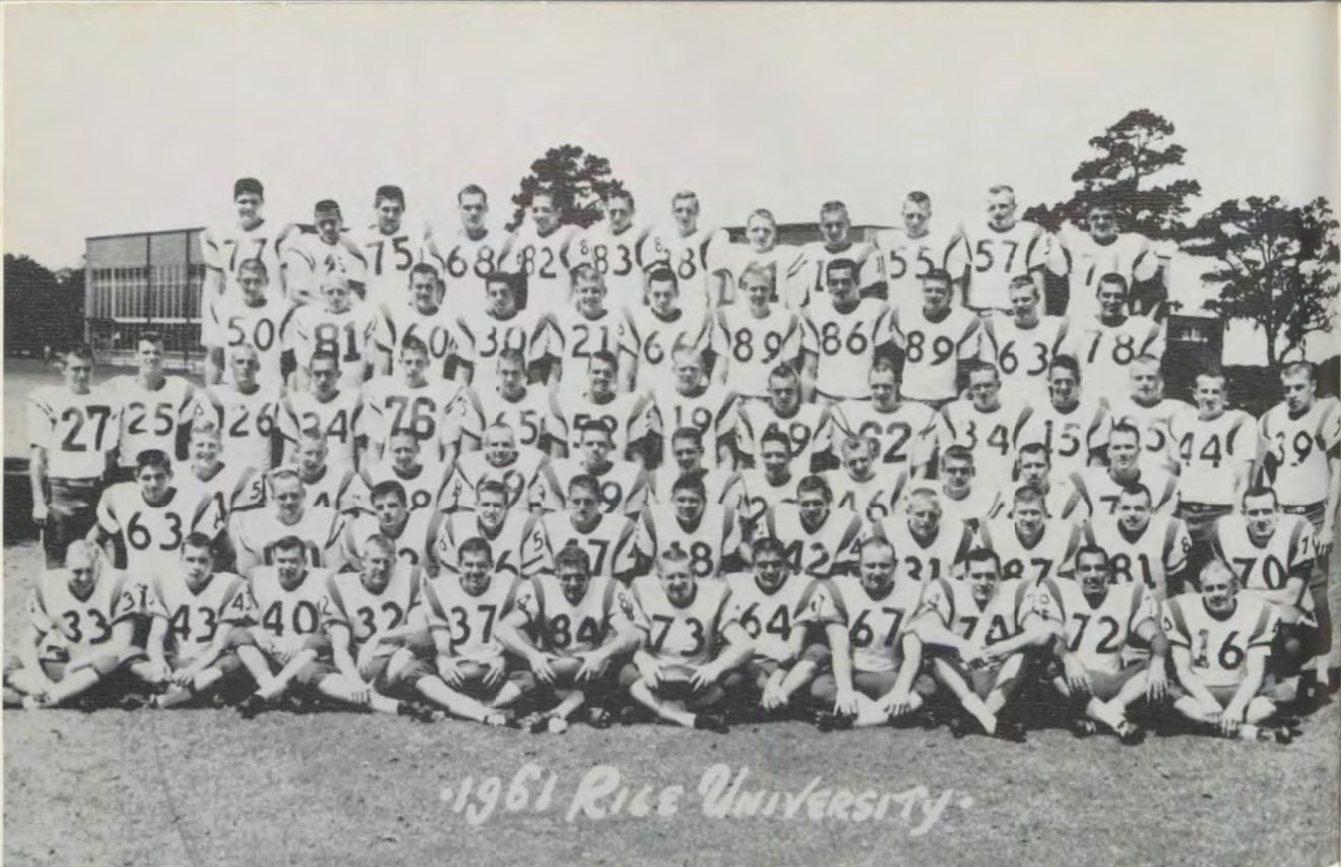
- 1961 team portrait from The Campanile

Bluebonnet Bowl, L 7–33 vs. Kansas
- Conference: Southwest Conference
- Record: 7–4 (5–2 SWC)
- Head coach: Jess Neely (22nd season)
- MVP: Les "Butch" Blume
- Captains: Ray Alborn; John Burrell; Roland Jackson
- Home stadium: Rice Stadium

1961 Southwest Conference football standings
	Conf.					Overall
Team	W		L		T	W		L		T
No. 3 Texas +	6	–	1	–	0	10	–	1	–	0
No. 9 Arkansas +	6	–	1	–	0	8	–	3	–	0
Rice	5	–	2	–	0	7	–	4	–	0
Texas A&M	3	–	4	–	0	4	–	5	–	1
TCU	2	–	4	–	1	3	–	5	–	2
Baylor	2	–	5	–	0	6	–	5	–	0
Texas Tech	2	–	5	–	0	4	–	6	–	0
SMU	1	–	5	–	1	2	–	7	–	1
+ – Conference co-champions; Rankings from AP Poll

The 1961 Rice Owls football team was an American football team that represented Rice University as a member of the Southwest Conference (SWC) during the 1961 college football season. In their 22nd year under head coach Jess Neely, the Owls compiled a 7–3 record (5–2 in conference games), finished in third place in the SWC, and outscored opponents by a total of 176 to 125. They concluded their season with a 33–7 loss to Kansas in the 1961 Bluebonnet Bowl

Halfback Butch Blume scored 74 points to break Rice's single-season scoring record, and fullback Roland Jackson led the team with 415 rushing yards. Jackson, end John Burrell, and tackle Robert Johnston received first-team honors on the 1961 All-Southwest Conference football team.

The Owls were ranked No. 7 in the AP writers poll early in the season, but dropped out of the rankings following their September 30 loss to Georgia Tech. They have not been ranked in the AP poll since that time.

The Owls played their home games at Rice Stadium in Houston, Texas.

== Schedule ==
Date	Opponent	Rank	Site	TV	Result	Attendance	Source
September 23	No. 5 LSU*		Rice Stadium; Houston, TX		W 16–3	73,000	
September 30	at Georgia Tech*	No. 7	Grant Field; Atlanta, GA		L 0–24	43,501	
October 14	Florida*		Rice Stadium; Houston, TX		W 19–10	32,000	
October 21	SMU		Rice Stadium; Houston, TX (rivalry)		W 10–0	37,000	
October 28	at No. 3 Texas		Memorial Stadium; Austin, TX (rivalry)		L 7–34	62,310	
November 4	at Texas Tech		Jones Stadium; Lubbock, TX		W 42–7	34,000	
November 11	Arkansas		Rice Stadium; Houston, TX		L 0–10	43,000	
November 18	Texas A&M		Rice Stadium; Houston, TX		W 21–7	53,000	
November 25	at TCU		Amon G. Carter Stadium; Fort Worth, TX		W 35–16	22,000	
December 2	Baylor		Rice Stadium; Houston, TX		W 26–14	30,000	
December 16	vs. Kansas*		Rice Stadium; Houston, TX (Bluebonnet Bowl)	CBS	L 7–33	52,000	
*Non-conference game; Rankings from AP Poll released prior to the game

== Statistics ==
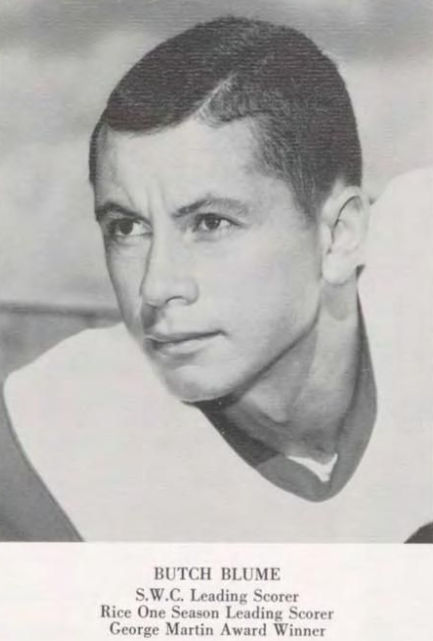
Halfback and MVP Les "Butch" Blume

The 1961 Owls gained an average of 174.0 rushing yards and 90.3 passing yards per game. On defense, they gave up an average of 175.6 rushing yards and 118.7 passing yards per game.

Rice halfback Les "Butch" Blume, a 5'9" clarinetist from LaGrange, Texas, scored 74 points in the regular season to win the 1961 Southwest Conference scoring championship. His point tally included six field goals and broke Dicky Moegle's Rice scoring record of 72 points in 1954.

Fullback Roland Jackson led the team with 415 rushing yards on 88 carries in 10 regular season games for an average of 4.7 yards per game. Other leading rushers included Butch Blume (308 yards, 44 carries, 5.6-yard average) and Randall Kerbow (249 yards, 72 carries, 3.5-yards average).

The team's passing leaders were quarterbacks Randall Kerbow (37-for-79, 505 yards, three touchdowns, six interceptions) and Billy Cox (23-for-52, 287 yards, five touchdowns, one interception). The leading receivers were Johnny Burrell (seven catches, 133 yards) and Gene Raesz (eight catches, 112 yards).

== Awards and honors ==
The team's tri-captains were tackle Ray Alborn, end John Burrell, and fullback Roland Jackson.

Halfback Les "Butch" Blume won the George Martin Award as the team's most valuable player.

Three Rice players received first-team honors from the Associated Press (AP) or the United Press International (UPI) on the 1961 All-Southwest Conference football team: Roland Jackson at fullback (AP-1, UPI-1); John Burrell at end (AP-1); and Robert Johnston at tackle (AP-1).

== Personnel ==
=== Players ===
The principal players featured in The Campanile yearbook were:

- Ray Alborn, tackle, senior, 6'1", 220 pounds, Houston, TX
- Larry Anthony, guard, senior, 6'0", 223 pounds, Lamesa, TX
- Les "Butch" Blume, halfback, junior, 5'9", 170 pounds, LaGrange, TX
- Mike Bowen, back, senior, 6'0", 190 pounds, Houston, TX
- Spencer Brown, back, senior, 6'0", 180 pounds, Kerryville, TX
- Johnny Burrell, end, senior, 6'3", 185 pounds, Fort Worth, TX
- Lonnie Caddell, back, senior, 6'2", 203 pounds, Dallas, TX
- Jerry Candler, halfback, junior, 6'0", 186 pounds, Ballinger, TX
- Johnny Cole, center, junior, 6'2", 202 pounds, Ft. Worth, TX
- John Cornett, tackle, senior, 6'4", 242 pounds, Alice, TX
- Billy Cox, quarterback, junior, 5'11", 188 pounds, Galena Park, TX
- Mike Fritsch, tackle, sophomore, 6'3", 241 pounds, Lockhart, TX
- Pat Gerald, center, junior, 6'0", 178 pounds, Sweetwater, TX
- Roland Jackson, fullback, senior, 6'0", 203 pounds, Ruston, LA
- Robert Johnston, tackle, 6'4", 217 pounds, Pine Bluff, AR
- George Karam, tackle, senior, 6'1", 210 pounds, McAllen, TX
- Jerry Kelly, end, sophomore, 6'0", 187 pounds, Eunice, NM
- Randall Kerbow, quarterback, junior, 6'0", 183 pounds, Pasadena, TX
- Dan Malin, center, junior, 6'3", 221 pounds, Temple, TX
- John Mims, tackle, sophomore, 6'3", 240 pounds, Mission, TX
- Johnny Nicols, guard, sophomore, 5'11", 200 pounds, Galena Park, TX
- Gary Poage, back, senior, 6'1", 185 pounds, Happy, TX
- Gene Raesz, end, junior, 6'1", 197 pounds, Taylor, TX
- Tommy Rees, end, junior, 6'4", 210 pounds, Big Lake, TX
- Ronny Schultz, end, senior, 6'3", 201 pounds, Austin, TX
- Kenny Simmons, guard, junior, 6'0", 194 pounds, Colorado City, TX
- John Sylvester, end, sophomore, 6'1", 175 pounds, Baytown, TX
- Bob Wayt, back, senior, 6'0", 178 pounds, White Oak, TX
- Dickie Woods, guard, senior, 5'11", 205 pounds, Sweetwater, TX

=== Coaching staff ===
- Head coach: Jess Neely
- Director of Athletics: Jess Neely
- Assistant coaches: Cecil B. Grigg, Charles E. Moore, A.M. "Red" Bale, Joe W. Davis, Bo Hagen
- Freshman football coach: Nick Lanza
- Trainer: Eddie Wojecki

=== Gallery ===
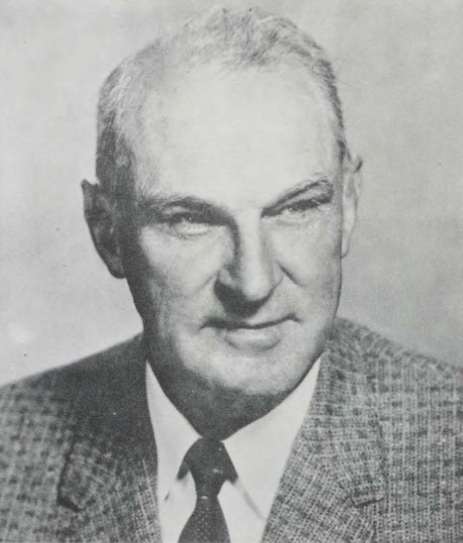
Head coach Jess Neely

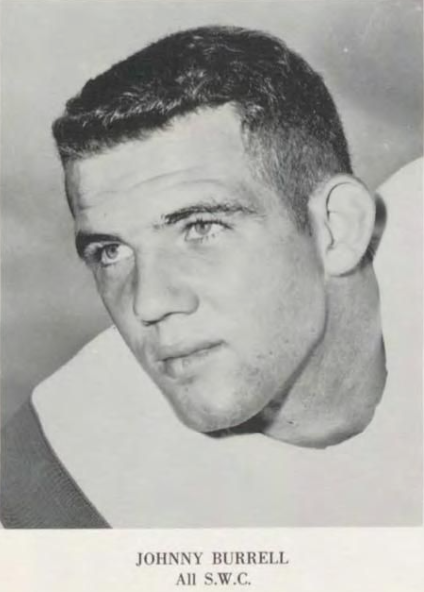
End Johnny Burrell

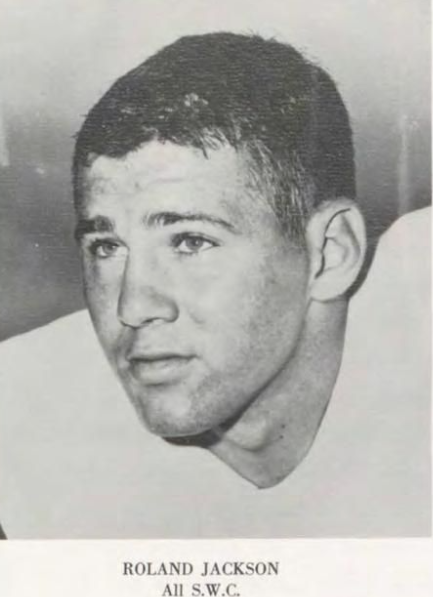
Fullback Roland Jackson

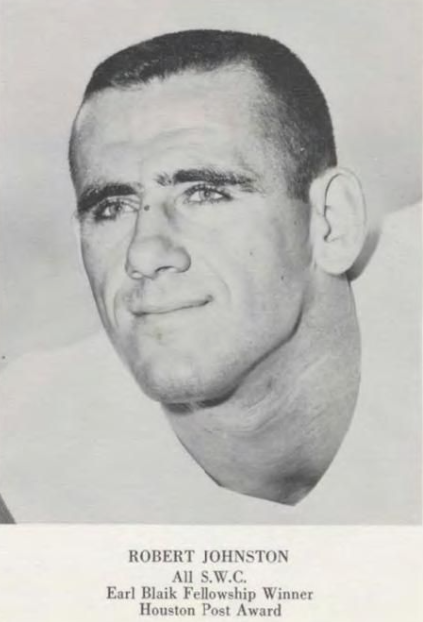
Tackle Robert Johnston

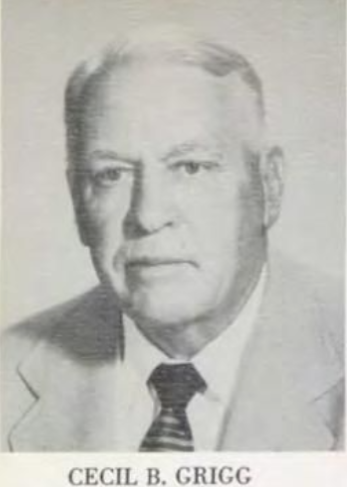
Assistant coach Cecil Grigg
