= 1961 Bluebonnet Bowl =

Kansas Jayhawks	Rice Owls
(6–3–1)	(7–3)
33	7
Head coach: Jack Mitchell	Head coach: Jess Neely
AP / Coaches; NR / 15
	1	2	3	4	Total
Kansas	6	6	13	8	33
Rice	0	7	0	0	7
- Date: December 16, 1961
- Season: 1961
- Stadium: Rice Stadium
- Location: Houston, Texas
- Attendance: 52,000

United States TV coverage
- Network: CBS

The 1961 Bluebonnet Bowl was a college football postseason bowl game between the Rice Owls and the Kansas Jayhawks.

== Background ==
This was the Owls' sixth bowl game in 14 years, and second in the year of 1961, having appeared in the Sugar Bowl in January, though they had lost the last two. This was the Jayhawks' first bowl game since 1948.

== Game summary ==
Rice was playing the game on its home turf, in the second annual Bluebonnet Bowl. Ken Coleman of Wichita ran for a 1-yard touchdown for Kansas, but the extra point fell short. Johnny Burrell caught a 5-yard touchdown pass from Randy Kerbow to give Rice a 7-6 lead. When Kansas was forced to punt later in the quarter, John Hadl mishandled the snap and ran 41 yards to give the Jayhawks crucial position. Coleman would score his second touchdown of the day to give Kansas a 12-7 lead at halftime. Rodger McFarland and Curtis McClinton both scored on rushing touchdowns on reverse plays to give Kansas a 25-7 lead by the fourth quarter, and McFarland scored his second touchdown in the fourth quarter to make the final score 33-7, giving Kansas their first-ever bowl win.

== Aftermath ==
This would be the last bowl game for the Owls until 2006. The Jayhawks would return to a bowl game in 1969.

== Statistics ==
Statistics	Kansas	Rice
First downs	21	11
Yards rushing	293	58
Yards passing	64	163
Total yards	357	221
Punts-Average	3-37.0	6-31.0
Fumbles lost	0	3
Penalty yards	15	0
