= 1961 Baylor Bears football team =

American college football season

1961 Baylor Bears football

Gotham Bowl champion

Gotham Bowl, W 24–9 vs. Utah State
- Conference: Southwest Conference
- Record: 6–5 (2–5 SWC)
- Head coach: John Bridgers (3rd season)
- Captains: Ronald Stanley; Bill Hicks; Bobby Lane
- Home stadium: Baylor Stadium

1961 Southwest Conference football standings
	Conf.					Overall
Team	W		L		T	W		L		T
No. 3 Texas +	6	–	1	–	0	10	–	1	–	0
No. 9 Arkansas +	6	–	1	–	0	8	–	3	–	0
Rice	5	–	2	–	0	7	–	4	–	0
Texas A&M	3	–	4	–	0	4	–	5	–	1
TCU	2	–	4	–	1	3	–	5	–	2
Baylor	2	–	5	–	0	6	–	5	–	0
Texas Tech	2	–	5	–	0	4	–	6	–	0
SMU	1	–	5	–	1	2	–	7	–	1
+ – Conference co-champions; Rankings from AP Poll

The 1961 Baylor Bears football team was an American football team that represented Baylor University as a member of the Southwest Conference (SWC) during the 1961 college football season. In their third year under head coach John Bridgers, the Bears compiled a 6–5 record (2–5 in conference games), tied for sixth place in the Big 8, and outscored opponents by a total of 188 to 164. Baylor played in the first Gotham Bowl, defeating the previously undefeated Utah State Aggies, 24–9.

Senior halfback Ronnie Bull led the team in rushing (441 yards), scoring (48 points), and pass receptions (19). Center Bill Hicks and guard Herbie Adkins received first-team honors on the 1961 All-Southwest Conference football team:

The team played its home games at Baylor Stadium in Waco, Texas.

== Schedule ==
Date	Opponent	Rank	Site	Result	Attendance	Source
September 23	Wake Forest*		Baylor Stadium; Waco, TX	W 31–0	28,000	
September 30	at Pittsburgh*		Pitt Stadium; Pittsburgh, PA	W 16–13	41,194	
October 14	Arkansas	No. 9	Baylor Stadium; Waco, TX	L 13–23	34,000	
October 21	at Texas Tech		Jones Stadium; Lubbock, TX (rivalry)	L 17–19	32,500	
October 28	at Texas A&M		Kyle Field; College Station, TX (Battle of the Brazos)	L 0–23	29,000	
November 4	TCU^{†}		Baylor Stadium; Waco, TX (rivalry)	W 28–14	23,000	
November 11	at No. 1 Texas		Memorial Stadium; Austin, TX (rivalry)	L 7–33	62,000	
November 18	Air Force*		Baylor Stadium; Waco, TX	W 31–7	22,000	
November 25	SMU		Baylor Stadium; Waco, TX	W 31–6	17,000	
December 2	at No. 17 Rice		Rice Stadium; Houston, TX	L 14–26	30,000	
December 9	vs. No. 10 Utah State*		Polo Grounds; New York, NY (Gotham Bowl)	W 24–9	15,123	
*Non-conference game; ^{†}Homecoming; Rankings from AP Poll released prior to the game

== Statistics ==
During the regular season, the 1961 Baylor team outscored opponents by a total of 188 to 164. They outgained opponents by a total of 2,867 yards to 2,486. In the air, they outgained opponents by 1,314 yards to 927.

Senior halfback Ronnie Bull led the team in both rushing (441 yards on 91 carries, 4.8-yard average), scoring (48 points), and pass receptions (19 receptions for 199 yards). Claude Pearson led the team in receiving yards with 217 yards on 18 receptions.

The team's passing leaders were Bobby Ply (39-for-86, 468 yards, six touchdowns, four interceptions), Ronnie Stanley (44-for-84, 451 yards, four touchdowns, eight interceptions), and Don Trull (26-for-56, 359 yards, four touchdowns, four interceptions).

== Awards and honors ==
Three Baylor players were honored on the 1961 All-Southwest Conference football team: center Bill Hicks (AP-1); guard Herby Adkins (AP-2, UPI-1); and halfback Ronnie Bull (AP-2).

== Personnel ==
=== Players ===
- Herbie Adkins, guard
- Ronnie Bull, halfback/fullback
- Robert Burk, guard
- John Frongillo, tackle
- Ronnie Goodwin, halfback
- Herbert Harlan, end
- Bill Hicks, center
- Dalton Hoffman, fullback
- James Ingram, end
- Johnny Jessup, tackle
- Bobby Lane, end
- Robert Mankin, guard
- Butch Maples, center
- Jon Markham, tackle
- Tommy Minter, halfback
- Bobby Moore, tackle
- Pete Nicklas, tackle
- Bobby Norvell, halfback
- Jim Oldham, halfback, senior
- Claude Pearson, end
- Ted Plumb, end
- Bobby Ply, quarterback
- Ronny Rogers, guard
- Ronnie Stanley, quarterback
- Bert Tate, halfback
- Don Trull, quarterback
- Sonny Whorton, fullback

=== Coaches and administration ===
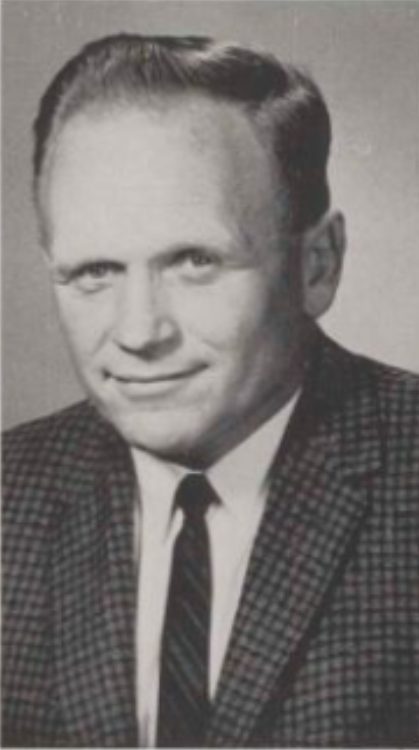
Head coach John Bridgers

- Head coach: John Bridgers
- Athletic director: John Bridgers
- Assistant coaches: Walt Hackett, Charles Driver, Purvis Chuck, Harris Wayne,
- Trainers: Weaver Jordan, Herb Zimmerman
