= 1961 Texas Tech Red Raiders football team =

American college football season

1961 Texas Tech Red Raiders football
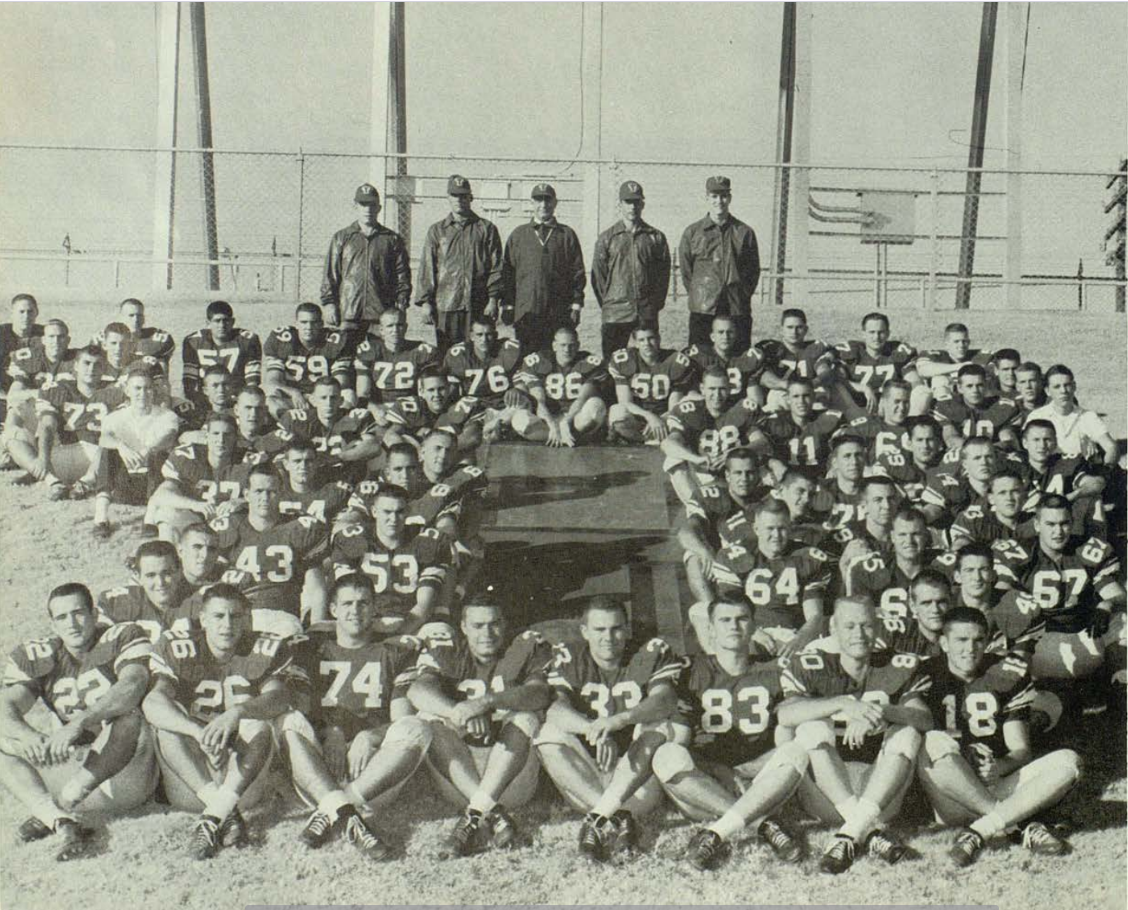
- 1961 team portrait from La Ventana yearbook
- Conference: Southwest Conference
- Record: 4–6 (2–5 SWC)
- Head coach: J. T. King (1st season)
- Offensive scheme: T formation
- Base defense: 4–3
- Home stadium: Jones Stadium

1961 Southwest Conference football standings
	Conf.					Overall
Team	W		L		T	W		L		T
No. 3 Texas +	6	–	1	–	0	10	–	1	–	0
No. 9 Arkansas +	6	–	1	–	0	8	–	3	–	0
Rice	5	–	2	–	0	7	–	4	–	0
Texas A&M	3	–	4	–	0	4	–	5	–	1
TCU	2	–	4	–	1	3	–	5	–	2
Baylor	2	–	5	–	0	6	–	5	–	0
Texas Tech	2	–	5	–	0	4	–	6	–	0
SMU	1	–	5	–	1	2	–	7	–	1
+ – Conference co-champions; Rankings from AP Poll

The 1961 Texas Tech Red Raiders football team was an American football team that represented Texas Technological College (now known as Texas Tech University) as a member of the Southwest Conference (SWC) during the 1961 college football season. In their first season under head coach J. T. King, the Red Raiders compiled a 4–6 record (2–5 in conference games), tied for sixth place in the SWC, and were outscored by a combined total of 201 to 94. The Raiders won conference games over TCU and Baylor and non-conference games over Boston College and West Texas State.

The team played its home games at Clifford B. and Audrey Jones Stadium in Lubbock, Texas.

== Schedule ==
Date	Opponent	Site	Result	Attendance	Source
September 23	at Mississippi State*	Mississippi Veterans Memorial Stadium; Jackson, MS	L 0–6	33,000	
September 30	at No. 6 Texas	Memorial Stadium; Austin, TX (rivalry)	L 14–42	43,500	
October 7	Texas A&M	Jones Stadium; Lubbock, TX (rivalry)	L 7–38	38,500	
October 14	TCU	Jones Stadium; Lubbock, TX (rivalry)	W 10–0	25,500	
October 21	Baylor	Jones Stadium; Lubbock, TX (rivalry)	W 19–17	32,500	
October 28	at SMU	Cotton Bowl; Dallas, TX	L 7–8	17,000	
November 4	Rice^{†}	Jones Stadium; Lubbock, TX	L 7–42	34,000	
November 11	Boston College*	Jones Stadium; Lubbock, TX	W 14–6	20,000	
November 25	at No. 9 Arkansas	War Memorial Stadium; Little Rock, AR (rivalry)	L 0–28	41,000	
December 2	West Texas State*	Jones Stadium; Lubbock, TX	W 16–14	25,000	
*Non-conference game; ^{†}Homecoming; Rankings from AP Poll released prior to the game

== Statistics ==
Texas Tech gained an average of 172.0 rushing yards and 89.1 passing yards per game. On defense, they gave up 202.7 rushing yards and 102.9 passing yards per game.

The Red Raiders' rushing offense was led by Coolidge Hunt who gained 486 yards on 128 carries for a 3.8-yard average. Other significant contributors included Johnny Lovelace (282 yards, 89 carries, 3.2-yard average), Bill Worley (217 yards, 49 carries, 4.4-yard average), David Rankin (190 yards, 58 carries, 3.3-yard average), Bake Turner (185 yards, 41 carries, 4.5-yard average), and H.L. Daniels (144 yards, 45 carries, 3.2-yard average).

The passing offense was led by quarterbacks Doug Cannon (37-for-77, 442 yards, one touchdown, six interceptions) and Johnny Lovelace (28-for-69, 359 yards, no touchdowns, four interceptions). The only two players with more than five receptions were Bob Witucki (26 receptions, 335 yards) and David Parks (16 receptions, 209 yards)

== Awards and honors ==
Back Coolidge Hunt received second-team honors from the Associated Press (AP) on the 1961 All-Southwest Conference football team. End David Parks received honorable mention.
