= 1963 All-Southwest Conference football team =

American college football all-star team

The 1963 All-Southwest Conference football team consists of American football players chosen by various organizations for All-Southwest Conference teams for the 1963 NCAA University Division football season. The selectors for the 1963 season included the Associated Press (AP) and the United Press International (UPI). Players selected as first-team players by both the AP and UPI are designated in bold.

== All Southwest selections ==
=== Backs ===
- **Don Trull**, Baylor (AP-1; UPI-1 [QB])
- **Tommy Ford**, Texas (AP-1; UPI-1 [HB])
- **Tommy Crutcher**, Texas Christian (AP-1; UPI-1 [FB])
- Donny Anderson, Texas Tech (AP-2; UPI-1 [HB])
- Paul Piper, Rice (AP-2; UPI-2)
- Duke Carlisle, Texas (AP-2; UPI-2)
- Billy Gannon, SMU (AP-2; UPI-3)
- Jim Fauver, TCU (UPI-2)
- Russell Wayt, Rice (UPI-2)
- Gene Fleming, Rice (UPI-3)
- Jim Lindsey, Arkansas (UPI-3)
- Dalton Hoffman, Baylor (UPI-3)

=== Ends ===
- **Dave Parks**, Texas Tech (AP-1; UPI-1)
- **Larry Elkins**, Baylor (AP-1 [back]; UPI-1)
- Jerry Lamb, Arkansas (AP-1; UPI-2)
- Jim Ingram, Baylor (AP-2; UPI-3)
- Jerry Kelley, Rice (AP-2)
- John Sylvester, Rice (UPI-2)
- Charles Talbert, Texas (UPI-3)

=== Tackles ===
- **Scott Appleton**, Texas (AP-1; UPI-1)
- **Bobby Crenshaw**, Baylor (AP-1; UPI-1)
- Bill Ward, Texas A&M (AP-2; UPI-2)
- Ken Henson, TCU (AP-2)
- Staley Faulkner, Texas (UPI-2)
- Wesley Brown, Arkansas (UPI-3)
- John Knee, SMU (UPI-3)

=== Guards ===
- Tommy Nobis, Texas (UPI-1)
- John Hughes, SMU (AP-2; UPI-1)
- Johnny Nichols, Rice (AP-1; UPI-2)
- Martin Cude, SMU (AP-1; UPI-3)
- Bob Mangun, TCU (AP-2; UPI-2)
- Steven Garmon, TCU (UPI-3)

=== Centers ===
- **Malcolm Walker**, Rice (AP-1; UPI-1)
- Ronnie Caveness, Arkansas (AP-2; UPI-2)
- David McWilliams, Texas (UPI-3)

== Key ==
AP = Associated Press

UPI = United Press International

Bold = Consensus first-team selection of both the AP and UP

== See also ==
- 1963 College Football All-America Team
