= James Saxton =

James, Jim or Jimmy Saxton may refer to:

- Jim Saxton (born 1943), American politician from New Jersey
- Jimmy Saxton (born 1940), American football player
- James Saxton (actor), see Braham Murray

== See also ==
- James Sexton, trade unionist and politician
