= 1961 Texas A&M Aggies football team =

American college football season

1961 Texas A&M Aggies football
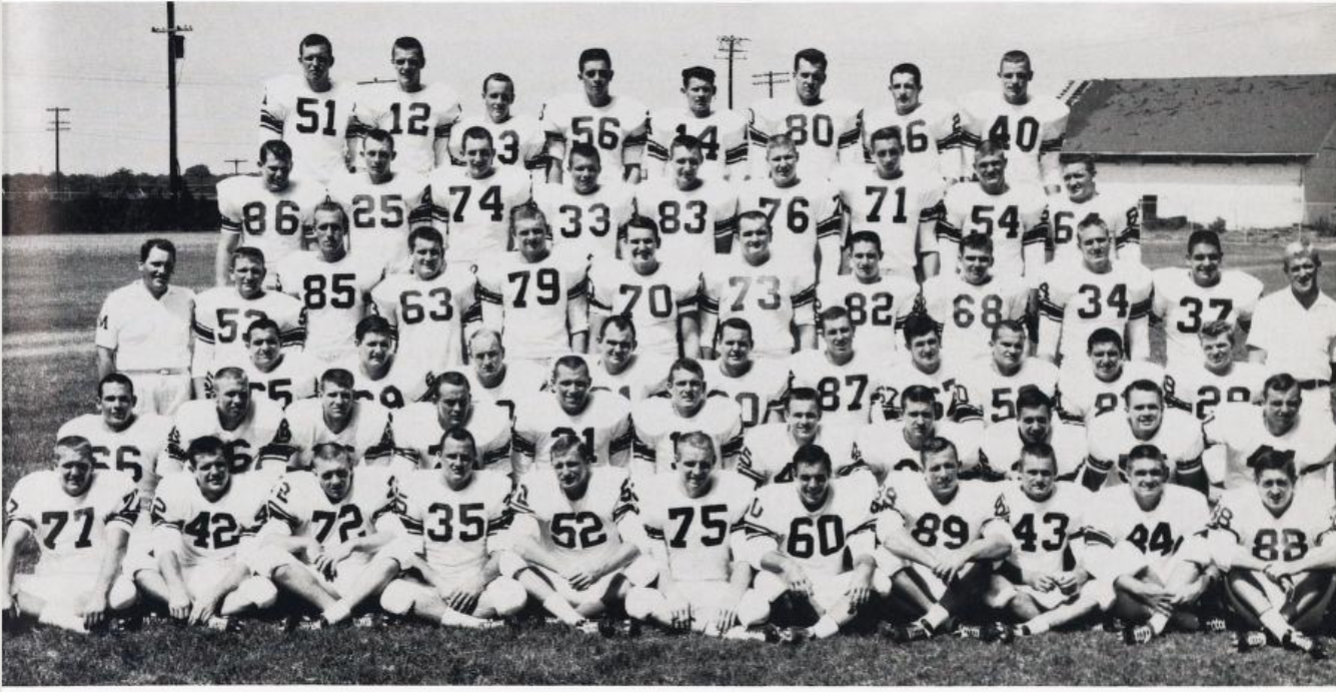
- 1961 team portrait from 1962 Aggieland yearbook
- Conference: Southwest Conference
- Record: 4–5–1 (3–4 SWC)
- Head coach: Jim Myers (4th season)
- Captains: Wayne Freiling; Wayland Simmons
- Home stadium: Kyle Field

1961 Southwest Conference football standings
	Conf.					Overall
Team	W		L		T	W		L		T
No. 3 Texas +	6	–	1	–	0	10	–	1	–	0
No. 9 Arkansas +	6	–	1	–	0	8	–	3	–	0
Rice	5	–	2	–	0	7	–	4	–	0
Texas A&M	3	–	4	–	0	4	–	5	–	1
TCU	2	–	4	–	1	3	–	5	–	2
Baylor	2	–	5	–	0	6	–	5	–	0
Texas Tech	2	–	5	–	0	4	–	6	–	0
SMU	1	–	5	–	1	2	–	7	–	1
+ – Conference co-champions; Rankings from AP Poll

The 1961 Texas A&M Aggies football team was an American football that represented Texas A&M University in the 1961 college football season as a member of the Southwest Conference (SWC). In their fourth and final year under head coach Jim Myers, the Aggies compiled a 4–5–1 record (3–4 in conference games), finished in fourth place in the SWC, and outscored opponents by a total of 184 to 118.

The school's yearbook described the season as "a year of great victories and narrow, bitter defeats," pointing to a 55–0 victory over Trinity (TX) followed one week later by a 15–14 loss to TCU. One day after the Aggies' season-ending loss to Texas, the university announced that Myers' contract as head coach would not be renewed. In four years under Myers, the Aggies won only five conference games and compiled an overall record of 12–24–4.

The team played its home games at Kyle Field in College Station, Texas.

== Schedule ==
Date	Opponent	Site	Result	Attendance	Source
September 23	Houston*	Kyle Field; College Station, TX	T 7–7	22,000	
September 30	at LSU*	Tiger Stadium; Baton Rouge, LA (rivalry)	L 7–16	64,000	
October 7	at Texas Tech	Jones Stadium; Lubbock, TX (rivalry)	W 38–7	38,500	
October 14	at Trinity (TX)*	Alamo Stadium; San Antonio, TX	W 55–0	13,500	
October 21	at TCU	Amon G. Carter Stadium; Fort Worth, TX	L 14–15	43,000	
October 28	Baylor	Kyle Field; College Station, TX (Battle of the Brazos)	W 23–0	29,000	
November 4	at Arkansas	Razorback Stadium; Fayetteville, AR (rivalry)	L 8–15		
November 11	SMU	Kyle Field; College Station, TX	W 25–12	18,000	
November 18	at Rice	Rice Stadium; Houston, TX	L 7–21	53,000	
November 23	No. 4 Texas	Kyle Field; College Station, TX (rivalry)	L 0–25	42,000	
*Non-conference game; Rankings from AP Poll released prior to the game

== Statistics ==
The 1961 Aggies gained an average of 162.7 rushing yards and 78.9 passing yards per game. On defense, they gave up 142.1 rushing yards and 98.7 passing yards per game.

The team's rushing offense featured ten players with at least 20 carries. Fullback Lee Roy Caffey led the group with 371 rushing yards on 85 carries, an average of 4.4 yards per carry. Others included fullback Sam Byer (256 rushing yards, 74 carries, 3.5-yard average), halfback Jim Linnstaedter (243 yards, 60 carries, 4.1-yards average), fullback Jerry Rodgers (174 yards, 49 carries, 3.4-yard average), and halfback Travis Reagan (168 yard, 49 carries, 3.4-yard average).

The team's passing offense included three quarterbacks who had at least 18 passing attempts:

- John Erickson led the group, completing 34 of 73 passes (46.6%) for 468 yards with two touchdowns, five interceptions, and a 95.8 quarterback rating.
- Ronnie Brice ranked second on the team, completing 13 of 24 passes (54.2%) for 149 yards with two touchdowns, one interception, and a 125.5 quarterback rating.
- Jim Keller completed seven of 18 passes for 83 yards win no touchdowns, two interceptions, and a 55.4 quarterback rating.

Halfback Travis Reagan was the team's leading receiver with 10 receptions for 201 yards, an average of 20.1 yards per catch. Reagan also led the team in scoring with 38 points on six touchdowns and two points after touchdown.

== Awards and honors ==
No Texas A&M players were selected by the Associated Press (AP) or United Press International (UPI) as first-team players on the 1961 All-Southwest Conference football team. Guard Wayne Freiling was named to the second team by the AP. Six Texas A&M players received honorable mention from the AP: end Russell Hill, tackles Joe Eilers and Wayland Simmons, center Jerry Hopkins; and backs Lee Roy Caffey and Travis Reagan.

== Personnel ==
=== Players ===
The principal players featured in Aggieland yearbook were:

- Ronnie Brice (#11), quarterback
- Larry Broaddus (#35), fullback
- Sam Byer (#37), fullback
- Lee Roy Caffey (#34), fullback
- Ronnie Carpenter (#82), end
- Bob Caskey (#43), halfback
- Mike Clark (#31), fullback
- Babe Craig (#21), halfback
- James Craig, tackle
- Larry Crutsinger (#82), end
- Guy Dillon (# 69), guard
- Joe Eilers (#72), tackle
- Bobby Elliott, quarterback
- John Erickson (#16), quarterback
- Bobby Evans (#80), end
- Jim Farris (#26), halfback
- Franklin Fisher (#89), end
- Wayne Freiling (#60), guard
- George Hargett (#23), halfback
- Jim Harper (#62), guard
- Russell Hill, end
- George Hogan (#70), tackle
- Jerry Hopkins (#50), center
- Bobby Huntington (#81), end
- Jerry Jenkins (#52), center
- Daryle Keeling (#84), end
- Jim Keller (#12), quarterback
- John Kolacek (#76), tackle
- Ben Krenek (#79), tackle
- Raymond Kubala (#51), center
- Raymond Kubesch (#25), halfback
- Walter LaGrone (#67), guard
- Pat Latham (#87), end
- Ronnie Ledbetter (#29), halfback
- Jim Linnsteadter (#14), halfback
- Bill Miller (#73), tackle
- Jim Murphy (#42), halfback
- Phil Peter (#40), halfback
- Jim Phillips (#63), guard
- Jerry Pizzitola (#65), guard
- David Powitsky (#78), tackle
- Travis Reagan (#41), halfback
- Jerry Rodgers (#33), fullback
- Wayland Simmons (#75), tackle
- Mike Swan (#56), guard
- Wayland Ward, tackle

=== Coaching staff ===
- Head coach: Jim Myers
- Assistant coaches: Bobby Drake Keith, Travis Hughes, Elmer Smith, Tom Ellis, Ty Bain, Jack Thomas
