= Jim Fauver =

Canadian football player

Profile
- Position: Halfback

Personal information
- Born: 1943 (age 82–83)
- Listed height: 5 ft 10 in (1.78 m)
- Listed weight: 195 lb (88 kg)

Career information
- College: Texas Christian

Career history
- 1965: Edmonton Eskimos

Awards and highlights
- Second-team All-SWC (1963)

Jim "Purple Hoss" Fauver (born 1943) is a Canadian football player who played for the Edmonton Eskimos. He played college football at Texas Christian University.
