= 1961 SMU Mustangs football team =

American college football season

1961 SMU Mustangs football
- Conference: Southwest Conference
- Record: 2–7–1 (1–5–1 SWC)
- Head coach: Bill Meek (5th season)
- Captains: Bobby Hunt; Max Christian; Mike Rice
- Home stadium: Cotton Bowl

1961 Southwest Conference football standings
	Conf.					Overall
Team	W		L		T	W		L		T
No. 3 Texas +	6	–	1	–	0	10	–	1	–	0
No. 9 Arkansas +	6	–	1	–	0	8	–	3	–	0
Rice	5	–	2	–	0	7	–	4	–	0
Texas A&M	3	–	4	–	0	4	–	5	–	1
TCU	2	–	4	–	1	3	–	5	–	2
Baylor	2	–	5	–	0	6	–	5	–	0
Texas Tech	2	–	5	–	0	4	–	6	–	0
SMU	1	–	5	–	1	2	–	7	–	1
+ – Conference co-champions; Rankings from AP Poll

The 1961 SMU Mustangs football team was an American football team that represented Southern Methodist University (SMU) as a member of the Southwest Conference (SWC) during the 1961 college football season. In their fifth and final year under head coach Bill Meek, the Mustangs compiled a 2–7–1 record (1–5–1 in conference games), finished last out of eight teams in the SWC, and were outscored by a total of 191 to 92.

The team's statistical leaders were Jerry Rhome (693 passing yards), Billy Gannon (187 rushing yards), and Buddy Nichols (161 receiving yards).

A few hours after the final game of the season, SMU announced that Meek had been fired as the team's head coach. In five seasons under Meek, SMU won only 10 SWC games and compiled an overall record of 17–29–4.

The team played its home games at the Cotton Bowl in Dallas.

== Schedule ==
Date	Opponent	Site	Result	Attendance	Source
September 23	Maryland*	Cotton Bowl; Dallas, TX	L 6–14	17,000	
September 29	at USC*	Los Angeles Memorial Coliseum; Los Angeles, CA	L 16–21	29,148	
October 7	Air Force*	Cotton Bowl; Dallas, TX	W 9–7	28,000	
October 21	at Rice	Rice Stadium; Houston, TX (rivalry)	L 0–10	37,000	
October 28	Texas Tech	Cotton Bowl; Dallas, TX	W 8–7	17,000	
November 4	No. 3 Texas	Cotton Bowl; Dallas, TX	L 0–27	41,000	
November 11	at Texas A&M	Kyle Field; College Station, TX	L 12–25	18,000	
November 18	Arkansas	Cotton Bowl; Dallas, TX	L 7–21	17,000	
November 25	at Baylor	Baylor Stadium; Waco, TX	L 6–31	17,000	
December 2	at TCU	Amon G. Carter Stadium; Fort Worth, TX (rivalry)	T 28–28	20,000	
*Non-conference game; Rankings from AP Poll released prior to the game

== Roster ==
1961 SMU Mustangs football team roster
Players			Coaches
Offense: Pos. / # / Name / Class; QB / 17 / Jerry Rhome / So	Defense: Pos. / # / Name / Class	Special teams: Pos. / # / Name / Class	Head coach: Bill Meek; Coordinators/assistant coaches Legend: (C) Team captain; (S) Suspended; (I) Ineligible; Injured; Redshirt
