= Ron Goodwin (American football) =

American football player (1941–2013)

No. 81
- Position: Wide receiver

Personal information
- Born: January 9, 1941; Phillips, Texas, U.S.
- Died: December 12, 2013 (aged 72); San Angelo, Texas, U.S.
- Listed height: 5 ft 11 in (1.80 m)
- Listed weight: 180 lb (82 kg)

Career information
- College: Baylor
- NFL draft: 1963: 16th round, 214th overall pick
- AFL draft: 1963: 11th round, 83rd overall pick

Career history
- Philadelphia Eagles (1963–1968)

Awards and highlights
- First-team All-SWC (1962)
- Stats at Pro Football Reference

Ronald Ray Goodwin (January 9, 1941 – December 12, 2013) was an American football wide receiver in the National Football League (NFL) who played for the Philadelphia Eagles. He played college football for the Baylor Bears.

== Early life ==
In 1959, Goodwin was named the "Most Outstanding Back" at the Texas Coaching School's All-Star Game.

== Professional career ==
Goodwin was drafted by the Eagles in 1963. Goodwin chose professional football over a $40,000 signing bonus to play professional baseball. After Goodwin had a strong training camp, the Eagles released former "world's fastest man" Frank Budd. Goodwin missed the start of his rookie season due to appendicitis. He was reinstated to the active roster on October 8, 1963. Goodwin finished his rookie season with 15 catches for 215 yards and four touchdowns. After the season, Goodwin was named to UPI's NFL All-Rookie Team.

After the 1968 season, Goodwin retired from football to pursue a career in law.

== Post-career ==
Goodwin was elected to the Baylor Athletics Hall of Fame in 1977.

== Death ==
Goodwin died on December 12, 2013, in San Angelo, Texas.
