= 1962 Sugar Bowl =

American college football game

- 28th Sugar Bowl
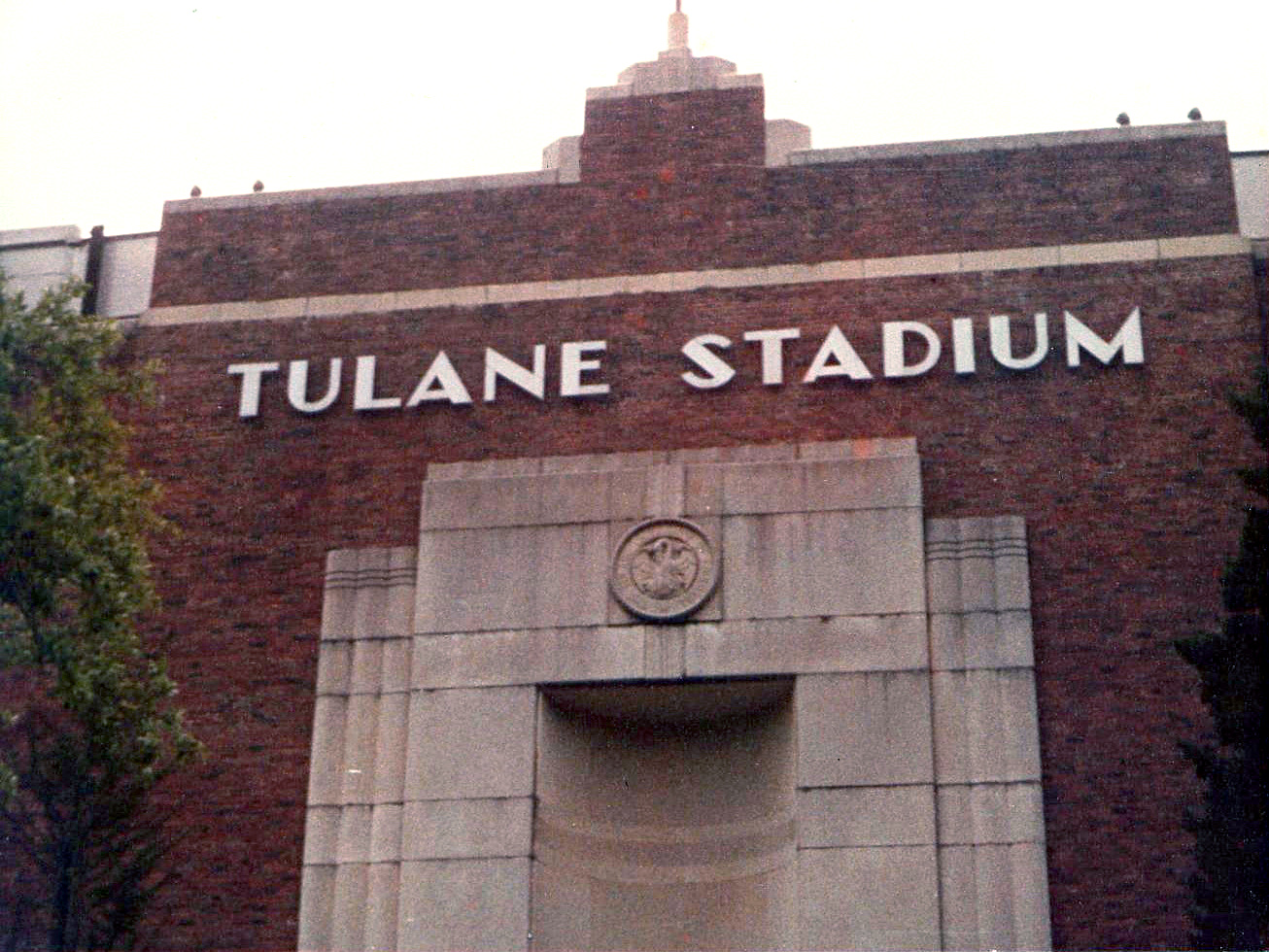
- Tulane Stadium in New Orleans, Louisiana, hosted the Sugar Bowl.
Alabama Crimson Tide	Arkansas Razorbacks
(10–0)	(8–2)
SEC	SWC
10	3
Head coach: Bear Bryant	Head coach: Frank Broyles
AP / Coaches; 1 / 1	AP / Coaches; 9 / 8
	1	2	3	4	Total
Alabama	7	3	0	0	10
Arkansas	0	0	3	0	3
- Date: January 1, 1962
- Season: 1961
- Stadium: Tulane Stadium
- Location: New Orleans, Louisiana
- MVP: Mike Fracchia
- Referee: Harold Matthews (SWC) (split crew between SWC & SEC)
- Attendance: 82,910

United States TV coverage
- Network: NBC

The 1962 Sugar Bowl featured the top-ranked Alabama Crimson Tide, and the ninth-ranked Arkansas Razorbacks.

== Setting ==
=== Alabama ===
Alabama entered the contest undefeated and as champions of the SEC.

=== Arkansas ===
The Razorback defense held opponents to 62.9 passing yards per game, the third best mark in the nation. The total defense (total yards given up) ranked tenth nationally, yielding only 177.4 ypg. Arkansas had tied for the SWC championship.

== Game summary ==
Alabama scored on a 12-yard Pat Trammell touchdown run, leading 7–0. A 32-yard Davis field goal in the second quarter extended Alabama's lead to 10–0. In the third quarter, Arkansas got on the board following a 23-yard Mickey Cissell field goal. In the end, Alabama's defense proved too much, as they shutout the Razorbacks the rest of the way. Mike Fracchia was named Sugar Bowl MVP.

Scoring summary

Quarter	Time	Drive			Team	Scoring information	Score	
Quarter	Time	Plays	Yards	TOP	Team	Scoring information	ALA	ARK
1			79		ALA	Pat Trammell 12-yard touchdown run, Davis kick good	7	0
2			4		ALA	32-yard field goal by Davis	10	0
3			83		ARK	23-yard field goal by Mickey Cissell	10	3
"TOP" = time of possession. For other American football terms, see Glossary of American football.							10	3
