= 1962 All-Southwest Conference football team =

American college football all-star team

The 1962 All-Southwest Conference football team consists of American football players chosen by various organizations for All-Southwest Conference teams for the 1962 NCAA University Division football season. The selectors for the 1962 season included the Associated Press (AP) and the United Press International (UPI). Players selected as first-team players by both the AP and UPI are designated in bold.

== All Southwest selections ==
=== Backs ===
- **Billy Moore**, Arkansas (AP-1; UPI-1)
- **Ron Goodwin**, Baylor (AP-1; UPI-1)
- **Tommy Ford**, Texas (AP-1; UPI-1)
- Jesse Branch, Arkansas (AP-2; UPI-1)
- Danny Brabham, Arkansas (AP-1; UPI-2)
- Don Trull, Baylor (AP-2; UPI-2)
- Ray Poage, Texas (AP-2; UPI-2)
- Pat Culpepper, Texas (AP-2; UPI-2)

=== Ends ===
- **Dave Parks**, Texas Tech (AP-1; UPI-1)
- **Gene Raesz**, Rice (AP-1; UPI-1)
- Tommy Lucas, Texas (AP-2; UPI-2)
- Tom Magoffin, Texas Christian (AP-2; UPI-2)

=== Tackles ===
- **Jerry Mazzanti**, Arkansas (AP-1; UPI-1)
- Scott Appleton, Texas (AP-2; UPI-1)
- Ray Schoenke, SMU (AP-1; UPI-2)
- Melvin Simmons, Texas A&M (AP-2; UPI-2)

=== Guards ===
- **Johnny Treadwell**, Texas (AP-1; UPI-1)
- Ray Trail, Arkansas (AP-2; UPI-1)
- Robert Burk, Baylor (AP-1; UPI-2)
- Robert Mangum, Texas Christian (AP-2; UPI-2)

=== Centers ===
- **Jerry Hopkins**, Texas A&M (AP-1; UPI-1)
- John Hughes, SMU (AP-2; UPI-2)

== Key ==
AP = Associated Press

UPI = United Press International

Bold = Consensus first-team selection of both the AP and UP

== See also ==
- 1962 College Football All-America Team
