= 1961 Gotham Bowl =

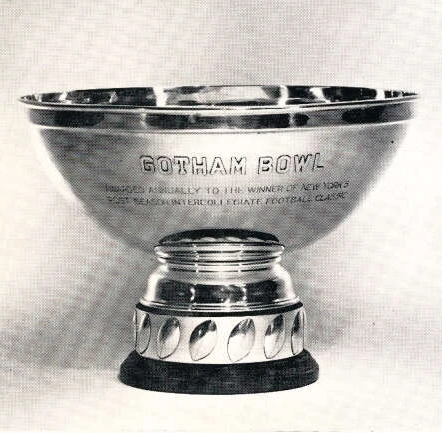
- The game trophy
Utah State Aggies	Baylor Bears
(9–0–1)	(5–5)
9	24
Head coach: John Ralston	Head coach: John Bridgers
AP / Coaches; 10 / 10
	1	2	3	4	Total
Utah State	0	0	3	6	9
Baylor	7	3	7	7	24
- Date: December 9, 1961
- Season: 1961
- Stadium: Polo Grounds
- Location: Upper Manhattan, New York
- MVP: RB Ronnie Bull, Baylor
- Referee: David H. Buchanan
- Attendance: 15,123

The 1961 Gotham Bowl was a college football postseason bowl game between the Utah State Aggies and the Baylor Bears at the Polo Grounds in New York. The game attracted a modest crowd of 15,153 fans because of inclement weather.

== Background ==
For the second straight year, the Aggies were champion of the Mountain States Conference. The Bears had finished tied for 6th in the Southwest Conference. Both teams were making bowl games for the 2nd straight year. This became the inaugural Gotham Bowl after attempts to invite schools such as Syracuse and Holy Cross to last year's game failed, leaving the bowl makers to cancel the game and wait for 1961.

== Game summary ==
- Baylor – Bull 14 yard touchdown run (Choate kick)
- Baylor – Choate 22 yard field goal
- Utah State – Turner 32 yard field goal
- Baylor – Trull 2 yard touchdown run (Choate kick)
- Baylor – Plumb 38 yard touchdown pass from Trull (Choate kick)
- Utah State – Munson 4 yard touchdown run (run failed)

Ronnie Bull scored on a 14-yard run to give the Bears a 7–0 lead as the first quarter expired, all set up by an Aggie fumble. Carl Choate added in a field goal later in the 2nd to make it 10–0 with 5:28 remaining in the half, which turned out to be the halftime lead. The Aggies narrowed the lead with a 36-yard field goal with 8:47 in the 3rd, but Don Trull increased the lead on a touchdown sneak with 1:22 remaining in the quarter to make it 17–3. Ted Plumb caught a 38-yard pass from Trull to make it 24–3 with 9:48 to go in the game. Munson made the final score 24–9 on his TD run, but by then there was only five minutes remaining as Baylor won their first bowl game since 1956. The Aggies turned the ball over eight times, while Don Trull threw 11-of-16 for 116 yards for the Bears. Bull rushed for 61 yards on 13 carries and caught 4 passes for 25 yards.

== Aftermath ==
The Aggies did not reach another bowl game again until 1993. The Bears played in the Bluebonnet Bowl two years later.

== Statistics ==
Statistics	Baylor	Utah State
First downs	14	10
Rushing yards	113	153
Passing yards	153	41
Passing (C–A–I)	13–26–0	3–14–3
Total yards	266	194
Punts–average	6–31.0	5–36.6
Fumbles–lost	5–2	6–5
Penalty–yards	3–16	2–32
