= Gene Raesz =

Canadian football player

Profile
- Positions: End, Halfback

Personal information
- Born: November 20, 1940; Williamson County, Texas, U.S.
- Died: April 1, 2024 (aged 83)
- Listed height: 6 ft 1 in (1.85 m)
- Listed weight: 198 lb (90 kg)

Career information
- College: Rice
- AFL draft: 1963: 23rd round, 182nd overall pick

Career history
- 1963: Edmonton Eskimos

Awards and highlights
- First-team All-SWC (1962)

Eugene Ernest Raesz Jr. (b. November 20, 1940 - d. April 1, 2024) is an American-born Canadian football player who played for the Edmonton Eskimos.
