= 1962 Cotton Bowl Classic =

- 26th Cotton Bowl Classic
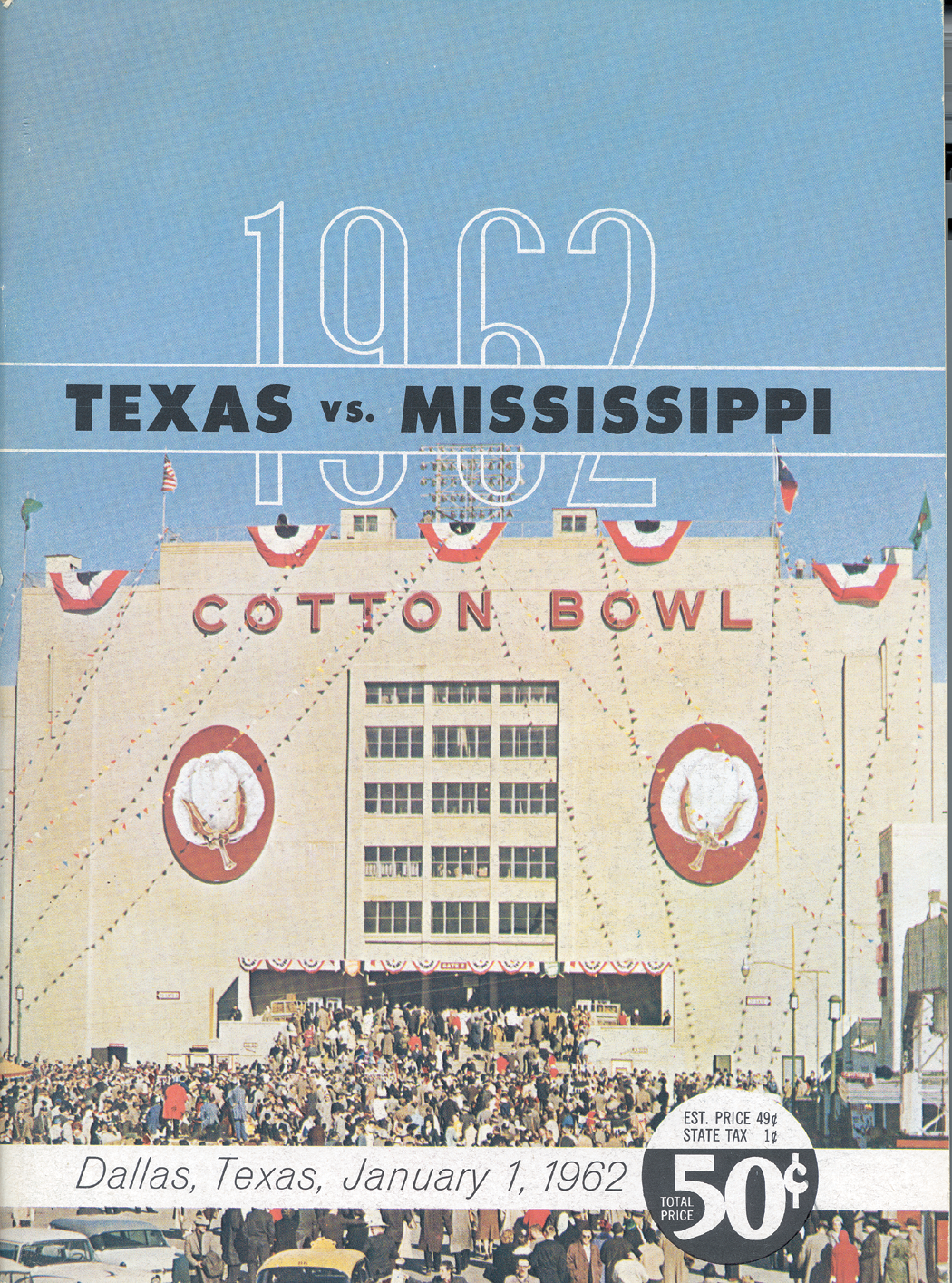
Ole Miss Rebels	Texas Longhorns
(9–1)	(9–1)
SEC	SWC
7	12
Head coach: Johnny Vaught	Head coach: Darrell Royal
AP / Coaches; 5 / 5	AP / Coaches; 3 / 4
	1	2	3	4	Total
Ole Miss	0	0	7	0	7
Texas	6	6	0	0	12
- Date: January 1, 1962
- Season: 1961
- Stadium: Cotton Bowl
- Location: Dallas, Texas
- MVP: Mike Cotten (Texas QB); Bob Moses (Texas E)
- Favorite: Ole Miss by 3 points
- Referee: Charles W. Bowen (SEC; split crew: SEC, SWC)
- Attendance: 75,504
- Payout: US$175,000 per team

United States TV coverage
- Network: CBS
- Announcers: Chris Schenkel, Johnny Lujack

The Cotton Bowl in Dallas, Texas, hosted the Cotton Bowl Classic.

The 1962 Cotton Bowl Classic was the 26th edition of the college football bowl game, played at the Cotton Bowl in Dallas, Texas, on Monday, January 1. Part of the 1961–62 bowl game season, the game featured the No. 3 Texas Longhorns of the Southwest Conference (SWC) and the No. 5 Ole Miss Rebels of the Southeastern Conference (SEC). Ole Miss was slightly favored, but Texas won, 12–7.

== Teams ==
Both teams had been ranked first in the polls before-mid season losses knocked them out of championship contention. At the end of the regular season, both were still ranked in the top five, which made for an interesting bowl matchup.

The Longhorns were co-champions of the Southwestern Conference while Ole Miss finished third in the Southeastern Conference. Texas was fourth in offense while Ole Miss was first. Both teams were in the middle of bowl streaks, the Longhorns were in their third consecutive bowl game, while Ole Miss was in their fifth consecutive bowl game.

=== Texas ===
The Longhorns were making their first of three consecutive Cotton Bowl appearances.

== Game summary ==
Tommy Ford intercepted Glynn Griffing's pass, which gave the Longhorns the ball at the Rebels' 34. Seven plays later, James Saxton scored from a yard out to give Texas the lead 47 seconds into the game. But Eldon Moritz's extra point attempt was blocked by James Dunaway to make it only 6–0. Mike Cotten drove his team 72 yards which culminated in a 24-yard touchdown pass to Jack Collins. But when Texas tried to make the two-point conversion, it fell short as the Longhorns held a 12–0 halftime lead.

Four minutes into the third quarter, Griffing drove his team 86 yards and threw a twenty-yard touchdown pass to Reed Davis to narrow the lead to five. But the Longhorn defense took over from there. Ole Miss had only one serious chance the rest of the game, as they drove to the 23 with eight minutes to go in the third. But Moses sacked Griffing on fourth down, as both teams did not score the rest of the game as Ole Miss lost their first game against the Southwest Conference.

=== Scoring ===
First quarter

- Texas – James Saxton 1-yard run (kick blocked)

Second quarter

- Texas – Jack Collins 24-yard pass from Mike Cotten (run failed)

Third quarter

- Ole Miss – Reed Davis 20-yard pass from Glynn Griffing (Sullivan kick)

Fourth quarter

No scoring

== Statistics ==
Statistics	Texas	Miss
First downs	12	17
Yards rushing	123	127
Yards passing	60	192
Total yards	183	319
Punts–Average	5–40.2	4–32.5
Fumbles–Lost	2–1	1–1
Interceptions	3	5
Penalties–Yards	3–35	4–30

== Aftermath ==
Texas went to the next two Cotton Bowls and later six straight (1969–1974), which included several national championships. The Longhorns also won the 1965 Orange Bowl over top-ranked Alabama.

Ole Miss went undefeated the following year and won the Sugar Bowl, but USC was declared champion by both major polls (AP, UPI). However, since other polls voted them champion, Ole Miss claims the 1962 title; their next Cotton Bowl was in January 2004.
