= Don Talbert =

American football player (born 1939)

No. 71, 72
- Position: Offensive tackle

Personal information
- Born: March 1, 1939 (age 87); Louisville, Mississippi, U.S.
- Listed height: 6 ft 5 in (1.96 m)
- Listed weight: 255 lb (116 kg)

Career information
- High school: Texas City (Texas City, Texas)
- College: Texas
- NFL draft: 1961: 8th round, 100th overall pick
- AFL draft: 1962: 34th round, 271st overall pick

Career history
- Dallas Cowboys (1962, 1965); Atlanta Falcons (1966–1968); New Orleans Saints (1969–1970); Dallas Cowboys (1971); Houston Texans/Shreveport Steamer (1974)

Awards and highlights
- Super Bowl champion (VI); First-team All-American (1961); First-team All-SWC (1961); Southwest Conference Co-Champion (1959, 1961); 1962 Cotton Bowl Classic Champion; 1960 Bluebonnet Bowl Co-Champion

Career NFL statistics
- Games played: 103
- Games started: 32
- Fumble recoveries: 3
- Military career
- Allegiance: United States
- Branch: United States Army
- Service years: 1963–1965
- Rank: Lieutenant
- Unit: Military Police Corps
- Conflicts: Vietnam War
- Awards: Vietnam Campaign Medal
- Stats at Pro Football Reference

Don Larry Talbert (born March 1, 1939) is an American former professional football player who was an offensive tackle for eight years, interrupted by two years in Vietnam, in the National Football League (NFL) for the Atlanta Falcons, New Orleans Saints and Dallas Cowboys including the Super Bowl VI champion Cowboys. He was previously an All-American playing college football for the Texas Longhorns.

== Early life ==
Talbert attended Texas City High School, where he played football and basketball.

He played college football at the University of Texas at Austin, where he was a two-way tackle and a three year letterman. He missed the 1958 season with a broken leg.

As a fifth-year senior in 1961, he was named All-SWC, an All-American and was voted outstanding SWC lineman in the Dallas Times Herald poll. He helped Texas to win co-conference championships twice, tie Alabama in the 1960 Bluebonnet Bowl and win the 1962 Cotton Bowl Classic. The Longhorns finished the 1961 season ranked #3, the best final ranking since 1950.

In 1992, he was inducted into the Longhorns Hall of Honor.

== Professional career ==
=== Dallas Cowboys (first stint) ===
Talbert was selected by the Dallas Cowboys in the eighth round (100th overall) of the 1961 NFL draft with a future draft pick, which allowed the team to draft him before his college eligibility was over. He was also selected by the Houston Oilers in the 34th round (271st overall) of the 1962 AFL draft.

As a rookie in 1962, although he played as a defensive end and linebacker, he was mostly the backup at right offensive tackle and got a chance to start in four games.

Talbert was in the reserve officer program at Texas and had to miss the next two seasons because of military service in the Vietnam War, where he was a police lieutenant in Saigon. He returned to the team in 1965, and played in all 14 games as a backup.

=== Atlanta Falcons ===
The Atlanta Falcons selected him from the Cowboys roster in the 1966 NFL expansion draft. He was the franchise's first starter at left tackle. He was a three-year starter. On July 3, 1969, he was traded along with Errol Linden to the New Orleans Saints in exchange for offensive linemen Roy Schmidt, Jim Ferguson and Jerry Jones.

=== New Orleans Saints ===
Talbert was a two-year starter at left tackle with the New Orleans Saints. On August 2, 1971, he was traded to the Dallas Cowboys in exchange for defensive end Doug Moore and a fourth round draft choice (#104-Eric Allen).

=== Dallas Cowboys (third stint) ===
In 1971, he was a backup until replacing Ralph Neely in the starting lineup at left tackle in the eighth game, after Neely had a motorcycle accident. Talbert promptly sprained his ankle, and was first replaced with Forrest Gregg and later by Tony Liscio. Nonetheless, he was able to be a part of the Super Bowl VI-winning team.

He was waived on September 7, 1972 and was later put on the future list, where he remained for the rest of the season. He was re-signed in 1973, but was waived on September 5 and placed on the team taxi squad, before being waived again on September 19.

=== Houston Texans/Shreveport Steamer (WFL) ===
Talbert was selected by the Chicago Fire in the sixth round (64th overall) of the 1974 WFL Pro Draft of NFL and CFL Players. He was signed by the Houston Texans. After playing 11 games, the team relocated to Shreveport, Louisiana on September 18, where they were renamed as the Shreveport Steamer.

== Personal life ==
Both of Talbert's brothers played college football at Texas as well. Charlie was a two-way starter at defensive end and receiver, the leading receiver on the 1963 National Championship team. His youngest brother, Diron Talbert, played defensive tackle in the NFL for the Los Angeles Rams and Washington Redskins. Diron was also inducted into the Longhorn Hall of Honor in 2005, after being all-southwest conference player.
