= Bill Hicks (American football) =

American football player and coach (born 1940)

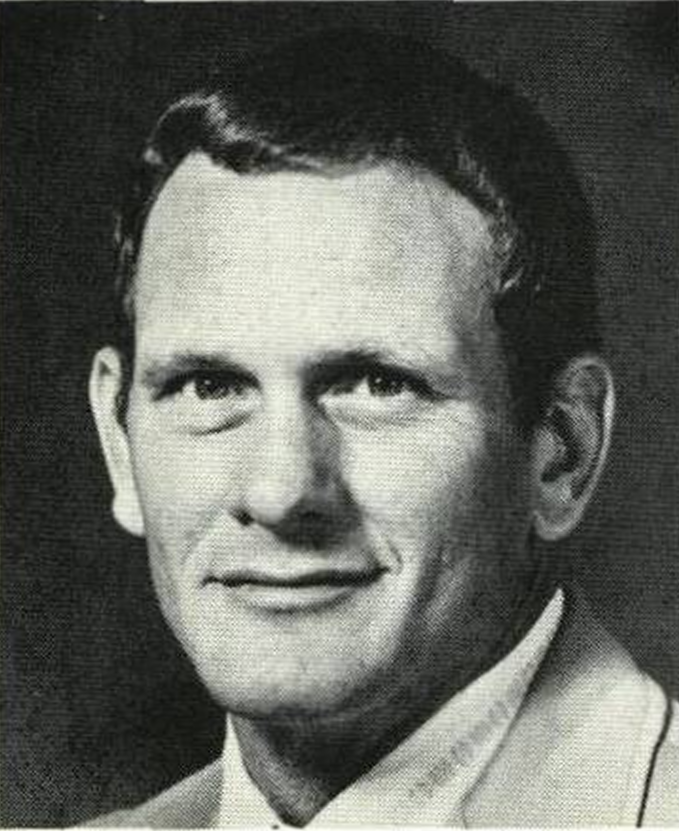
- Hicks, c. 1976

Biographical details
- Born: May 16, 1940 (age 85)

Playing career
- 1959–1961: Baylor
- Position: Center

Coaching career (HC unless noted)
- 1964–1965: Texas A&I (line)
- 1966–1968: West Virginia (DL)
- 1969–1981: Baylor (defensive assistant)
- 1982–1985: Howard Payne
- 1986–1988: Texas (defensive assistant)

Head coaching record
- Overall: 8–29–3

Accomplishments and honors

Awards
- First-team All-SWC (1961)

Bill Hicks (born May 16, 1940) is an American former football player and coach. He was the 15th head football at Howard Payne University in Brownwood, Texas, serving for four seasons, from 1982 to 1985, and compiling a record of 8–29–3. As a player, Hicks was an All-Southwest Conference center at Baylor University in 1961, and was named to the Baylor All-Decade team of the 1960s. Hick began his coaching career as an assistant at Texas College of Arts and Industries—now known as Texas A&M University–Kingsville and West Virginia University. He returned to Baylor to coach in 1969 and spent over a decade there as a defensive assistant. He was elected to the Baylor Athletics Hall of Fame in 2017. After leaving Howard Payne, he spent three years on the defensive staff at the University of Texas at Austin. He then coached at the high school level in Texas, retiring in 2013.

== Head coaching record ==
Year	Team	Overall	Conference	Standing	Bowl/playoffs
Howard Payne Yellow Jackets (Lone Star Conference) (1982–1985)
1982	Howard Payne	3–7	1–6	T–7th	
1983	Howard Payne	2–8	1–6	T–7th	
1984	Howard Payne	1–8–1	0–4	5th	
1985	Howard Payne	2–6–2	0–5	6th	
Howard Payne:		8–29–3	2–21		
Total:		8–29–3			
