= Dalton Hoffman =

American gridiron football player (born 1941)

No. 34
- Position: Fullback

Personal information
- Born: December 23, 1941 (age 84); Ballinger, Texas
- Listed height: 6 ft 0 in (1.83 m)
- Listed weight: 207 lb (94 kg)

Career information
- High school: Ballinger (TX)
- College: Baylor

Career history
- Houston Oilers (1964–1965); Edmonton Eskimos (1965)
- Stats at Pro Football Reference

Dalton Hoffman (born December 23, 1941) is an American former football fullback. He played for the Houston Oilers from 1964 to 1965.
