= Tommy Ford (American football) =

American football player

Texas Longhorns
- Position: Tailback

Personal information
- Born: c. 1942

Career information
- College: Texas

Awards and highlights
- National champion (1963); First-team All-American (1963); 2× First-team All-SWC (1962, 1963)

Tommy Ford (born c. 1942) was an American football player. He played for the Texas Longhorns football team from 1961 to 1963. He was the leading rusher (738 yards) on the 1963 Texas Longhorns football team that won the national championship. He was also selected by the Football Writers Association of America as a first-team back on the 1963 College Football All-America Team.
