= Randy Kerbow =

American football player (born 1940)

Profile
- Positions: Quarterback, Wide receiver

Personal information
- Born: December 19, 1940 (age 85); Paris, Texas
- Listed height: 6 ft 1 in (1.85 m)
- Listed weight: 190 lb (86 kg)

Career information
- College: Rice
- NFL draft: 1953: 6th round, 63rd overall pick

Career history
- 1963: Houston Oilers
- 1965–1968: Edmonton Eskimos
- Stats at Pro Football Reference

Randall Morris Kerbow (born December 19, 1940) is a former football player in the National Football League and Canadian Football League.

A quarterback for the Rice Owls football team from 1960 to 1962, Kerbow made the Houston Oilers as a wide receiver in 1963. After failing to make the Oilers in 1964, he made the Edmonton Eskimos in 1965 as a quarterback. In 1966, Kerbow led Edmonton to its first Western Football Conference playoff berth in five seasons. Benched in favor of Heisman Trophy winner Terry Baker in 1967, Kerbow left Edmonton to try out for the New Orleans Saints in 1968. After failing to make the team, he rejoined the Eskimos where he split playing time with Frank Cosentino. Although he was expected to regain the starting job full-time in 1969, Kerbow opted to retire.
