= Sonny Gibbs =

American football player (1939–2026)

- Gibbs on cover of 1962 Official Collegiate Football Record Book

No. 11, 10, 18
- Position: Quarterback

Personal information
- Born: October 25, 1939; Graham, Texas, U.S.
- Died: February 27, 2026 (aged 86)
- Listed height: 6 ft 7 in (2.01 m)
- Listed weight: 225 lb (102 kg)

Career information
- High school: Graham
- College: TCU
- NFL draft: 1962: 2nd round, 18th overall pick
- AFL draft: 1962: 14th round, 106th overall pick

Career history
- Dallas Cowboys (1963); Toledo Tornadoes (1964); Detroit Lions (1964); Philadelphia Bulldogs (1965); Brooklyn Dodgers (1966); Akron Vulcans (1967); Charleston Rockets (1967)

Awards and highlights
- Second-team All-SWC (1961)

Career NFL statistics
- Passing yards: 3
- TD–INT: 0-1
- Passer rating: 2.8
- Stats at Pro Football Reference

Guy Gilbert Gibbs Jr. (October 25, 1939 – February 27, 2026) was an American professional football player who was a quarterback in the National Football League (NFL) for the Dallas Cowboys and Detroit Lions. He played college football for the TCU Horned Frogs.

== Early life ==
Gibbs was a highly recruited athlete coming out of Graham High School. He accepted a football scholarship from Texas Christian University, to become part of the school's tradition at quarterback. In college, he was a highly publicized athlete, who was usually mentioned in pre-season All-American teams, but could never reach that type of success.

As a sophomore, he shared the quarterback position with Donald George, recording 47 completions (second in the conference) out of 111 attempts (second in the conference) for 473 yards (fifth in the conference), three touchdowns (tied for fifth in the conference) and nine interceptions.

In 1961, as a junior he registered 71 completions (second in the conference) out of 137 attempts (led the conference) for 999 yards (led the conference), six touchdowns (tied for second in the conference) and eight interceptions. He also played a key role in beating No. 1–ranked Texas and received the Rogers Trophy as the team MVP at the end of the season.

As a senior, he was the second leading passer in the conference with 89 completions out of 169 attempts for 1,013 passing yards, nine touchdowns and nine interceptions. He played in the East-West Shrine Game, the Hula Bowl and the Chicago College All-Star Game. As a three-year starter, he finished with 207 completions for 2,485 passing yards and 18 touchdowns.

== Professional career ==
=== Dallas Cowboys ===
With no first round draft choice in the 1962 NFL draft, the Dallas Cowboys selected Gibbs in the second round (18th overall) with a future draft pick, which allowed the team to draft him before his college eligibility was over. He was also selected by the Denver Broncos in the 14th round (106th overall) of the 1962 AFL draft.

In 1963, Gibbs entered the league as the tallest quarterback in NFL history (until 1991 when Dan McGwire broke the record). Being the third string quarterback, he wasn't activated for any game of the season. He also developed a close relationship with Don Meredith, where Gibbs tried to emulate his lifestyle. He was waived on September 3, 1964.

=== Toledo (UFL) ===
In 1964, he signed with the Toledo Tornadoes of the United Football League at the request of the Dallas Cowboys.

=== Detroit Lions ===
Even though he signed a three-year no-cut contract that was honored by the Dallas Cowboys, he was released before the start of the 1964 season. On October 27, 1964, because the Cowboys still held Gibbs rights, the Detroit Lions traded a fourth-round draft choice (#53-Bob Svihus) and paid over US$40,000 to be able to sign him, so he could back up Milt Plum, after Earl Morrall was lost for the year with a broken collarbone.

In 1965, he walked away from the NFL, after Gibbs was told that he was going to be traded.

=== Philadelphia Bulldogs (Continental League) ===
In 1965, he signed with the Philadelphia Bulldogs of the Continental Football League. He was a backup behind Bob Brodhead, making 9-of-19 completions (47.4%) for 196 yards, 2 touchdowns and one interception.

=== Brooklyn Dodgers (Continental League) ===
In 1966, he was selected in the Continental Football League expansion draft by the Brooklyn Dodgers. He shared the position with quarterback Tom Kennedy, registering 59-of-113 completions (52.2%) for 848 yards, 4 touchdowns and 7 interceptions.

=== Akron Vulcans (Continental League) ===
In July 1967, he was signed by the new Akron Vulcans franchise. He started 4 games and went 1-3, before the club folded. He tallied 49-of-102 completions (48%) for 640 yards, one touchdown and 4 interceptions.

=== Charleston Rockets (Continental League) ===
On September 27, 1967, he was signed by the Charleston Rockets to replace quarterback Ron Miller. He passed 98-of-219 completions (44.7%) for 1,118 yards, 8 touchdowns and 8 interceptions. He finished his career the same year.

== Death ==
Gibbs died on February 27, 2026, at the age of 86.
