= John Burrell (wide receiver) =

American football player (1940–2024)

No. 86, 48
- Position: Wide receiver

Personal information
- Born: November 22, 1940 (age 85); Fort Worth, Texas, U.S.
- Listed height: 6 ft 3 in (1.91 m)
- Listed weight: 185 lb (84 kg)

Career information
- College: Rice (1958-1961)
- NFL draft: 1962: 7th round, 92nd overall pick
- AFL draft: 1962: 25th round, 195th overall pick

Career history
- San Francisco 49ers (1961)*; Pittsburgh Steelers (1962–1964); Washington Redskins (1966); Virginia Sailors (1967); Washington Redskins (1967)
- * Offseason or practice squad member only

Awards and highlights
- 2× First-team All-SWC (1960, 1961)

Career NFL statistics
- Receptions: 26
- Receiving yards: 437
- Rushing yards: 38
- Stats at Pro Football Reference

John Buster Burrell (November 22, 1940 – September 28, 2024) was an American professional football wide receiver in the National Football League (NFL) for the San Francisco 49ers, Pittsburgh Steelers, and Washington Redskins. He played college football at Rice University and was drafted in the seventh round of the 1962 NFL draft. Burrell was also selected in the 25th round of the 1962 AFL draft by the Dallas Texans. Burrell died on September 28, 2024, at the age of 83.
