= Johnny Treadwell =

American football player (1941–2014)

Profile
- Positions: Offensive guard, Linebacker

Personal information
- Born: May 19, 1941; Austin, Texas, U.S.
- Died: December 14, 2014 (aged 73); Texas, U.S.

Career information
- High school: Austin (TX) Stephen F. Austin
- College: Texas

Awards and highlights
- Unanimous All-American (1962); 2× First-team All-SWC (1961, 1962)

John C Treadwell (May 19, 1941 – December 14, 2014) was an American football player.

Treadwell was born in Austin, Texas, in 1941. He attended Stephen F. Austin High School and then enrolled at the University of Texas. He played college football at the offensive guard and linebacker positions for the Texas Longhorns football team from 1960 to 1962. He was a consensus first-team guard on the 1962 All-America team, and was also named an Academic All-American in 1962 and 1963. The Houston Post named him the Most Valuable Player on defense in the Southwest Conference for 1962, and he played in the 1963 Hula Bowl.

Treadwell later worked as a veterinarian for almost 40 years. He suffered from chronic traumatic encephalopathy, caused by repetitive brain trauma, in his later years. He died in 2014 of natural causes at age 73.
