= Tommy Joe Crutcher =

American football player (1941–2002)

No. 37, 56
- Position: Linebacker

Personal information
- Born: August 10, 1941; McKinney, Texas, U.S.
- Died: February 16, 2002 (aged 60); Port Isabel, Texas, U.S.
- Listed height: 6 ft 3 in (1.91 m)
- Listed weight: 229 lb (104 kg)

Career information
- High school: McKinney
- College: TCU
- NFL draft: 1964: 3rd round, 41st overall pick
- AFL draft: 1964: 11th round, 82nd overall pick

Career history
- Green Bay Packers (1964–1967); New York Giants (1968–1969); Green Bay Packers (1971–1972)

Awards and highlights
- 2× Super Bowl champion (I, II); 3× NFL champion (1965-1967); First-team All-American (1963); First-team All-SWC (1963)

Career NFL statistics
- Interceptions: 3
- Sacks: 1
- Stats at Pro Football Reference

Tommy Joe Crutcher (August 10, 1941 – February 16, 2002) was an American football player who played for the Green Bay Packers, New York Giants, and the Los Angeles Rams of the National Football League (NFL). He played college football at Texas Christian University.

Tommy Joe Crutcher (6’ 3” 192) with 10.5 speed, was one of the finest fullbacks and defensive linebackers in Texas High School football during the late 1950s. As a junior in 1958, Crutcher was a strong, punishing runner who rushed for 1,070 yards in 13 games to lead the McKinney Lions offense. Crutcher was an All-District as a junior and also an outstanding outside linebacker that had numerous unassisted tackles as the Lions lost in the 1958 AAA semi-final game to eventual AAA state champion Breckenridge. Despite missing 3 games with a shoulder injury his senior year in 1959, Crutcher still managed to lead the Lions with 850 yards rushing on 143 carries over 7 games. He was also well known for his crushing tackles from his defensive linebacker position. He was co-captain of the football team and a 1959 AAA Honorable Mention All-State selection. Tommy Joe, a High School Football All-American, was highly respected by his coaches, teachers, teammates, and the people of McKinney.

Crutcher attended Texas Christian University where he was first-team All-America in 1963. As a TCU sophomore in 1961, he rushed for 580 yards. During his junior year in 1962, Crutcher rushed for 542 yards on 108 carries and was an All-Conference selection, while in 1963, he rushed for 473 yards on 108 carries to lead the Hornfrogs offense. He was also Co-Captain and played fullback on offense and linebacker on defense.

He was drafted by the Green Bay Packers in the third round of the 1964 NFL draft and he played linebacker on the Packers' Super Bowl teams of '66 & '67. He also played with the New York Giants, Los Angeles Rams, and was later traded back to the Green Bay Packers. He had been dealt by the Giants to the Rams for 1972 third- (69th overall–Houston running back Tom Mozisek) and seventh-round (177th overall–Notre Dame defensive tackle Mike Zikas) selections on May 30, 1970. He finished his 8-year pro career in 1972.

Crutcher died at age 60 in Port Isabel, Texas, on February 16, 2002. He was managing the Southwest Grain Company in McCook, Texas, prior to his death.
