= Danny Brabham =

American football player (1941–2011)

No. 85
- Position: Linebacker

Personal information
- Born: February 25, 1941; Magnolia, Mississippi, U.S.
- Died: January 22, 2011 (aged 69); Prairieville, Louisiana, U.S.
- Listed height: 6 ft 4 in (1.93 m)
- Listed weight: 235 lb (107 kg)

Career information
- High school: Greensburg (LA)
- College: Arkansas
- NFL draft: 1963: 3rd round, 30th overall pick
- AFL draft: 1963: 1st round, 6th overall pick

Career history
- Houston Oilers (1963-1967); Cincinnati Bengals (1968)

Awards and highlights
- First-team All-SWC (1962)

Career AFL statistics
- Interceptions: 1
- Sacks: 2
- Stats at Pro Football Reference

Danny Brabham (February 25, 1941 – January 22, 2011) was an American football player who played collegiately at linebacker for the University of Arkansas, and for six seasons in the American Football League (AFL) for the Houston Oilers and the Cincinnati Bengals.

Brabham died in his home in Prairieville, Louisiana, on January 22, 2011. He was one of at least 345 NFL players to be diagnosed after death with chronic traumatic encephalopathy (CTE), caused by repeated hits to the head.

== See also ==
- List of American Football League players
