= Jimmy Saxton =

American football player (1940–2014)

- Saxton on cover of Sports Illustrated (1961) ("Football's Fanciest Runner")

No. 10
- Position: Halfback

Personal information
- Born: May 21, 1940; Bryan, Texas, U.S.
- Died: May 28, 2014 (aged 74); Austin, Texas, U.S.
- Listed height: 5 ft 11 in (1.80 m)
- Listed weight: 173 lb (78 kg)

Career information
- High school: Palestine (Palestine, Texas)
- College: Texas
- NFL draft: 1962: 11th round, 146th overall pick
- AFL draft: 1962: 10th round, 75th overall pick

Career history
- Dallas Texans (1962)

Awards and highlights
- AFL champion (1962); Unanimous All-American (1961); 2× First-team All-SWC (1960, 1961)

Career AFL statistics
- Rushing yards: 1
- Rushing average: 0.3
- Receptions: 5
- Receiving yards: 64
- Stats at Pro Football Reference
- College Football Hall of Fame

James Everett Saxton Jr. (May 21, 1940 – May 28, 2014) was an American professional football player who was a halfback for the Dallas Texans of the American Football League (AFL) in 1962, when the team won the AFL Championship. He played college football at Texas, where he was an All-American and a finalist for the Heisman Trophy in 1961. He was inducted into the College Football Hall of Fame in 1996.

== College career ==
Though he never took a snap in high school, Texas coach Darrell Royal envisioned Saxton as a quarterback, and so during his freshman and sophomore years that was the position he played. However, in 1959, Texas would have no fewer than 6 quarterbacks and Saxton would see the least playing time of all of them.

After the 1959 season, Royal asked Saxton to switch to halfback, the prime running back in the Wing T formation and Saxton agreed. The following season, he led the Longhorns in rushing.

In his senior season, Saxton and the Longhorns broke out. That season, he set the school and Southwest Conference record for yards per carry, became Texas' first consensus All-American running back, and finished third in Heisman voting behind Syracuse's Ernie Davis and Ohio State's Bob Ferguson. The Longhorns, meanwhile, were ranked #1 for only the 3rd time in school history and the 1961 team was the first in school history to hold the #1 ranking for two weeks. It was the first Royal team to contend for the National Championship and went 10–1. After beating everyone but Oklahoma by at least 3 touchdowns and with only two very beatable teams left on the schedule, they seemed to be a lock to finish the season ranked #1. But they suffered their only loss in a shocking 6–0 upset at the hands of 24-point underdog TCU on a trick play, in a game that Saxton had to leave after he was knocked unconscious on a controversial knee-to-the-head early in the game. He finished his career with a win over Mississippi in the 1962 Cotton Bowl in which he set the school record for longest punt in a bowl game with a 73-yard quick kick.

== Professional career ==
Saxton was selected in the 11th round (146th overall) of the 1962 NFL draft by the St. Louis Cardinals and in the 10th round (75th overall) of the 1962 AFL draft by the Dallas Texans. He signed with Dallas and saw limited play with them during their AFL Championship 1962 season. He played halfback and punter and returned kickoffs while being tooled as a flanker. He punted twice in, what was at the time, the longest game in AFL/NFL history, the 1962 AFL Championship game. During the 1963 off season, the Texans moved to Kansas City to become the Chiefs and Saxton declined to go with them; he only wanted to play in Texas to stay close to his business interests.

After leaving football, he went into the banking business in Austin where he worked for 27 years. During that time he was chairman of the board of Texas Commerce Bank in Austin, head of the Austin Chamber of Commerce, and chairman of the State Board of Insurance.

He died of dementia on May 28, 2014, and was buried on the shores of Red Lake near the town of Fairfield, Texas.
