= 1961 All-Southwest Conference football team =

American college football all-star team

The 1961 All-Southwest Conference football team consists of American football players chosen by various organizations for All-Southwest Conference teams for the 1961 college football season. The selectors for the 1961 season included the Associated Press (AP) and the United Press International (UPI). Players selected as first-team players by both the AP and UPI are designated in bold.

== All Southwest selections ==
=== Backs ===
- **Jimmy Saxton**, Texas (AP-1; UPI-1)
- **Mike Cotten**, Texas (AP-1; UPI-1)
- **Lance Alworth**, Arkansas (AP-1; UPI-1)
- **Roland Jackson**, Rice (AP-1; UPI-1)
- Sonny Gibbs, Texas Christian (AP-2)
- Ronnie Bull, Baylor (AP-2)
- Coolidge Hunt, Texas Tech (AP-2)
- George McKinney, Arkansas (AP-2)

=== Ends ===
- **Bob Moses**, Texas (AP-1; UPI-1)
- John Burrell, Rice (AP-1)
- Jim Collier, Arkansas (AP-2; UPI-1)
- Buddy Iles, Texas Christian (AP-2)

=== Tackles ===
- **Don Talbert**, Texas (AP-1; UPI-1)
- Robert Johnston, Rice (AP-1)
- Bobby Plummer, TCU (AP-2; UPI-1)
- John Childress, Arkansas (AP-2)

=== Guards ===
- **Dean Garrett**, Arkansas (AP-1; UPI-1)
- Ray Schoenke, SMU (AP-1)
- Johnny Treadwell, Texas (AP-1)
- Herby Adkins, Baylor (AP-2; UPI-1)
- Wayne Freiling, Texas A&M (AP-2)

=== Centers ===
- Bill Hicks, Baylor (AP-1)
- David Kristynik, Texas (UPI-1) (brother of Marvin Kristynik)
- Max Christian, SMU (AP-2)

== Key ==
AP = Associated Press

UPI = United Press International

Bold = Consensus first-team selection of both the AP and UPI

== See also ==
- 1961 College Football All-America Team
