= Landmark Theatre (Syracuse, New York) =

Theater in Syracuse, New York

- Loew's State Theater
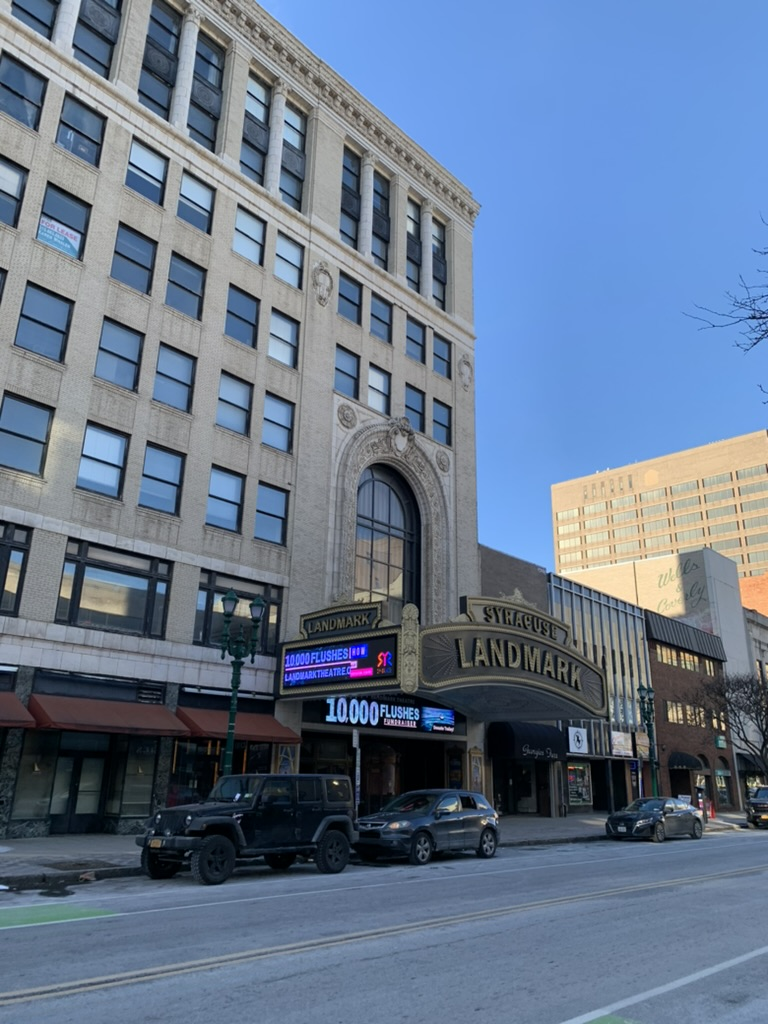
- The Theatre's exterior in January 2023
- Interactive map of Landmark Theatre
- Address: 362 S. Salina Street; Syracuse, New York; United States
- Owner: Syracuse Area Landmark Theatre
- Capacity: 2,908
- Type: Movie palace
- Screen: 1
- Current use: Performing arts center

Construction
- Opened: February 18, 1928

Website
- landmarktheatre.org
- Loew's State Theater
- U.S. National Register of Historic Places
- Location within New York
- Location: 362-374 S. Salina St., Syracuse, NY
- Coordinates: 43°2′50.67″N 76°9′9.36″W
- Architect: Thomas W. Lamb
- Architectural style: Classical Revival
- NRHP reference No.: 77000970
- Added to NRHP: May 02, 1977

The Landmark Theatre, originally known as Loew's State Theater, is a historic theater from the era of movie palaces, located on South Salina Street in Syracuse, New York, United States. Designed by Thomas W. Lamb, it is the city's only surviving example of the opulent theatrical venues of the 1920s. The Landmark is on the National Register of Historic Places.

== History ==
The Loew's Corporation announced plans for a new theater on February 19, 1926. It would be built at the intersection of South Salina Street and West Jefferson Street, previously the location of the Jefferson Hotel. The Loew's State Theatre opened on February 18, 1928, and offered double bills of famous vaudeville stage acts and first-run films. During the Great Depression and World War II it continued to do good business, as theater patrons escaped for a few hours into its plush grandeur.

However, by the 1970s, the theater suffered from low attendance and was in disrepair. It closed in 1975 and was in danger of demolition. In 1976, Syracuse Area Landmark Theatre, or SALT, was formed to preserve and renovate the venue. The concert impresario Murray Bernthal and his first wife, Rose, were among those who worked to save the theater. Rose Bernthal became its first executive director in 1977.

With the help of an October 11, 1977 benefit concert by Harry Chapin, the group successfully raised $65,000 to purchase the property, at which time Loew's State was renamed the Landmark Theatre. SALT gained ownership of the theater while the remainder of the building including the upper floors remained with then-owner Sutton Real Estate.

The Landmark eventually purchased the first two floors of the building and a $16 million renovation project lasting from October 2010 to November 2011 expanded the backstage area, also providing new dressing rooms and green rooms in a plan to try to attract larger, longer-running events to the theater. The aging, recessed loading dock in the theater's rear on South Clinton Street was removed and replaced with a new two-bay dock. The box office was relocated from Jefferson Street to Salina Street, next to the lobby entrance and the original wooden ticket booth, both disused since its Loews State days. Awnings over the street-level storefronts were removed.

In addition to the theater, the building also includes several storefronts and offices on the upper floors. The Clinton Street storefronts were eliminated during the backstage expansion, the display windows now used for event posters. The upper floors have a separate entrance on West Jefferson Street and are collectively referred to as the Loews Building. Three floors have been converted by developer Robert Doucette into 24 condominium apartments. On September 12, 2008, the Landmark hosted the world premiere of The Express, a fictionalized account of the life of Syracuse University alumnus Ernie Davis, attended by stars Rob Brown and Dennis Quaid. Several blocks of South Salina Street, normally a main thoroughfare through downtown, were closed to traffic for the event.

== Architecture ==
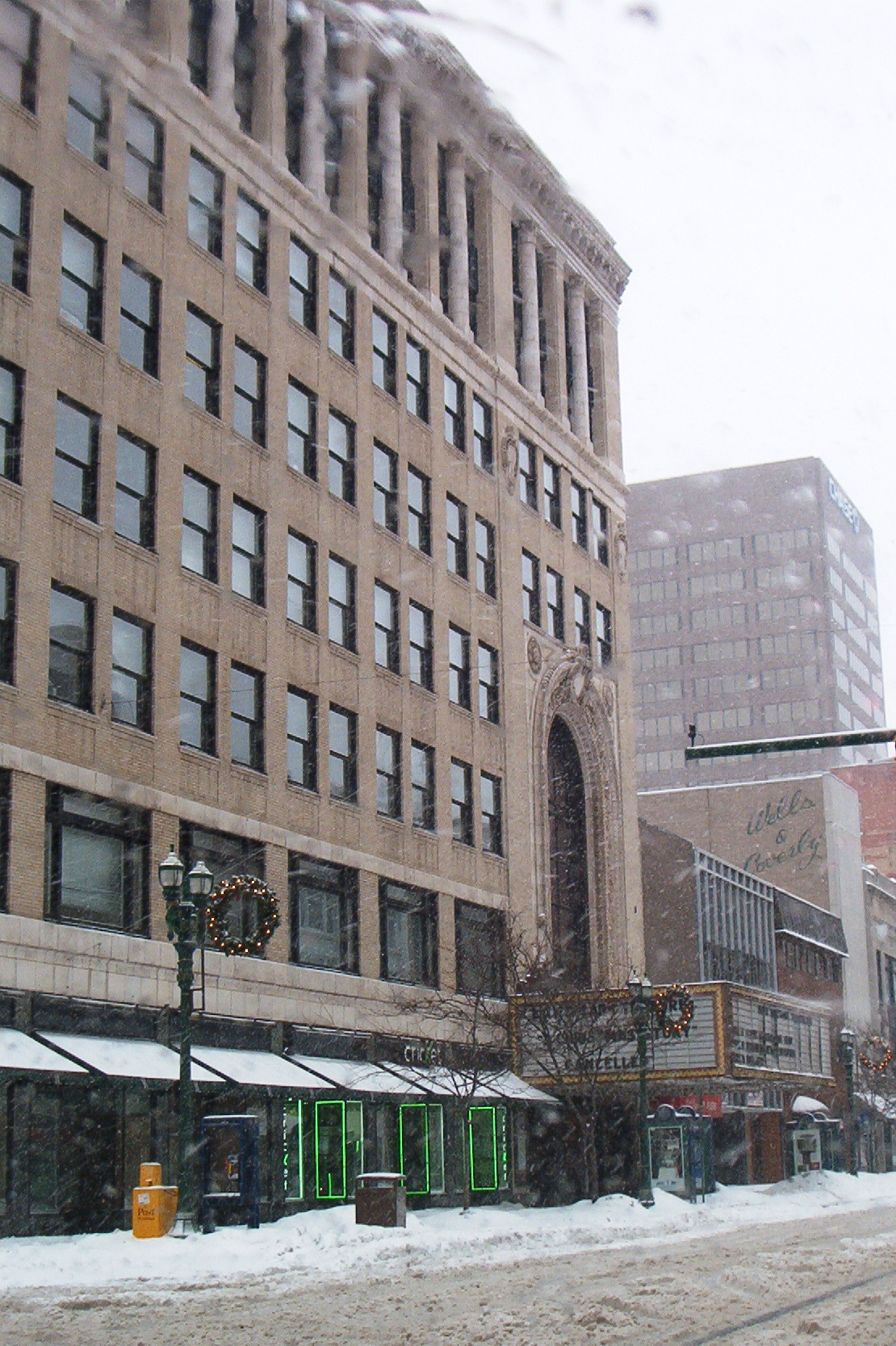
Loews State Theatre, broader view of exterior.

According to Peter Baum of SALT, Loew's State was the first great "Oriental-style" movie theater, predating two of Loew's "Oriental palaces" in New York City. Architect Thomas Lamb described the theatre as "European, Byzantine, Romanesque – which is the Orient as it came to us through the merchants of Venice." A large chandelier once hung in the lobby, originally designed by Louis Tiffany for Cornelius Vanderbilt's mansion. The chandelier was sold during the 1970s. A 1,400-pipe Wurlitzer organ was also once a major feature of the venue, but was also gone by the time SALT purchased the property. The promenade lobby, reached via a grand staircase, once held a fishpond with a Japanese pagoda fountain. The Landmark's red and gold decor and several large murals have been preserved and restored. The restored lobby is closed to the public and is only open for special events.
