= 1962 All-East football team =

American college football all-star team

The 1962 All-East football team consists of American football players chosen by various selectors as the best players at each position among the Eastern colleges and universities during the 1962 NCAA University Division football season.

== Backs ==
- Bill King, Dartmouth (AP-1; UPI-1)
- Roger Kochman, Penn State (AP-1; UPI-1)
- Paul Martha, Pittsburgh (AP-1; UPI-1)
- Rick Leeson, Pittsburgh (AP-1; UPI-1)
- Gary Wood, Cornell (AP-2; UPI-3)
- Pete Liske, Penn State (AP-2; UPI-3)
- Roger Staubach, Navy (AP-3; UPI-2)
- Al Snyder, Holy Cross (AP-3; UPI-2)
- Harry Crump, Boston College (AP-2; UPI-3)
- Billy Joe, Villanova (AP-2)
- Pat McCarthy, Holy Cross (UPI-2)
- Jack Concannon, Boston College (AP-3)
- Joe Iacone, West Chester (AP-3)
- Tom Hennessey, Holy Cross (UPI-3)

== Ends ==
- Dave Robinson, Penn State (AP-1; UPI-1)
- John Mackey, Syracuse (AP-2; UPI-1)
- Art Graham, Boston College (AP-1; UPI-2)
- Walt Sweeney, Syracuse (AP-2; UPI-3)
- Dave Hudepohl, Harvard (AP-3)
- Ron Allshouse, Penn (AP-3)
- Dick Tyrrell, Bucknell (UPI-3)

== Tackles ==
- Ron Testa, Navy (AP-1; UPI-1)
- Chuck Sieminski, Penn State (AP-1; UPI-1)
- Charlie Johnson, Villanova (AP-2; UPI-2)
- Lou Cioci, Boston College (AP-2)
- Bill Hawkins, Army (UPI-2)
- Dennis Golden, Holy Cross (AP-3; UPI-3)
- John Contoulis, Connecticut (AP-3; UPI-3)

== Guards ==
- Hatch Rosdahl, Penn State (AP-1; UPI-1)
- Dave Meggyesy, Syracuse (AP-2; UPI-1)
- Dick Nowak, Army (AP-1; UPI-2)
- Joe Blasenstein, Penn State (AP-2; UPI-2)
- Jim Irwin, Pittsburgh (AP-3)
- Tony Day, Columbia (AP-3)
- Tony Hoeflinger, Rutgers (UPI-3)
- Steve Hoy, Navy (UPI-3)

== Center ==
- Don McKinnon, Dartmouth (AP-1; UPI-1)
- Jon Morris, Holy Cross (AP-2; UPI-2)
- Mike Reily, Williams (AP-3)
- Mike Heffernan, Colgate (UPI-3)

== Key ==
- AP = Associated Press
- UPI = United Press International

== See also ==
- 1962 College Football All-America Team
