= Joe Goldenberg =

American basketball player and coach

Personal information
- Born: c. 1937 Philadelphia, Pennsylvania, U.S.
- Died: October 26, 2026 Blue Bell, Pennsylvania, U.S.
- Listed height: 5 ft 7 in (1.70 m)

Career information
- High school: West Philadelphia High School (Philadelphia, Pennsylvania)
- College: Temple (1956–1959)
- Position: Guard

Career history

Coaching
- 1969–1990: West Philadelphia High School

Joe Goldenberg (c. 1937-October 26, 2026) was an American former basketball player and coach. He played college basketball at Temple (1956-1959) and coached at West Philadelphia High School (1969-1990).

== Early life ==
A native of Philadelphia, Pennsylvania, Goldenberg played high school basketball at West Philadelphia High School from 1952 to 1955.

== College career ==
Goldenberg played college basketball for the Temple Owls men's basketball team from 1956 to 1959. At Temple he averaged 2.1 points per game and 1.4 points per game respectively in his first two seasons, before averaging 10.6 points per game in 25 games played in the 1958-59 season. He was a member of the 1957–58 Temple Owls men's basketball team that went 27–3 and reached the Final Four.

== Coaching career ==
Goldenberg was the head coach at his alma mater West Philadelphia High School from 1969 until 1990, where he earned 410 wins as a head coach. One of the greatest coaches in school history, he led his team to five consecutive Public League titles from 1975-1979 and four city championships from 1976-1979. West Philadelphia had a 68 game winning streak under his leadership from 1976 to 1978.

His 1977 team at West Philadelphia High was ranked as the top high school boy's basketball team in the country, led by the quartet of Gene Banks, Clarence Tillman, Darryl Warwick, and Joe Garrett. Banks went on to the NBA while Tillman, Warwick, and Garrett all played collegiately.

== Honors ==
He is an inductee into the Philadelphia Jewish Sports Hall of Fame. He has been honored with commendations from the City Council of Philadelphia in 1975, 1976, 1977, 1978, 1988, and 1990 and from the Pennsylvania House of Representatives in 1979 and 1987.
