= Gary Fleder =

American film director

- Born: December 19, 1965 (age 60); Norfolk, Virginia, U.S.
- Occupations: Film director, producer
- Years active: 1992–present
- Children: 1

Gary Fleder (/ˈfleɪdər/; born December 19, 1965) is an American film director, screenwriter, and producer. His most recently completed film, Homefront, was released by Open Road Films and Millennium Films in November 2013. In recent years he has been a prolific director of television pilots.

== Life and career ==
Fleder was born to a Jewish family in Norfolk, Virginia, the son of Lorraine and Harry Fleder. A graduate of Boston University and the USC School of Cinematic Arts, Fleder began his television career in 1992 with the episode "Seance" followed by the award-winning episode of Tales from the Crypt ("Forever Ambergris", starring Steve Buscemi and Roger Daltrey). Since then, he has directed pilots and episodes of more than a dozen television series, including L.A. Doctors, Blind Justice, The Evidence, The Shield, Life on Mars, Happy Town, Star-Crossed, Turn: Washington's Spies and Kingdom. He was an executive producer and frequent director of October Road, Life Unexpected, and The Art of More.

Fleder directed "Subway" a 1996 episode of Homicide: Life on the Street that earned a Peabody Award for its guest star, Vincent D'Onofrio. He also collaborated with producer Tom Hanks to direct an episode of the Emmy Award winning mini-series From the Earth to the Moon.

Things to Do in Denver When You're Dead, Fleder's feature film debut, premiered at the 1995 Cannes Film Festival. This crime film, written by Fleder's Boston University classmate and frequent collaborator Scott Rosenberg, remains a cult favorite and has been credited with reviving the career of Treat Williams. Denver marked Fleder's first work with several artists who have become recurring collaborators, including production designer/art director Nelson Coates, costume designer Abigail Murray, script supervisor Elizabeth Ludwick, and composer Steve Weisberg.

Since then, Fleder has directed a series of thrillers, including Kiss the Girls (1997), starring Ashley Judd and Morgan Freeman; Don't Say a Word (2001), featuring Brittany Murphy and Michael Douglas; Impostor (2001), a sci-fi thriller based on a Philip K. Dick short story, starring Gary Sinise, Madeleine Stowe, and Vincent D'Onofrio; and Runaway Jury (2003), starring John Cusack and Academy Award winners Gene Hackman and Dustin Hoffman, and based on the novel by John Grisham.

The Express: The Ernie Davis Story, released in October 2008, stars Dennis Quaid, Rob Brown, and Charles S. Dutton. It tells the story of Ernie Davis (1939–1963), the first African-American winner of the Heisman Trophy.

Fleder is a member of the Directors Guild's Special Projects Committee and has served as adjunct faculty at USC School of Cinematic Arts. Fleder also served as a mentor on student productions, including the USC thesis film Eyeball Eddie (2001), directed by Elizabeth Allen Rosenbaum. He and Scott Rosenberg sponsor an annual short screenplay contest at the Redstone Film Festival in Boston. He is depicted in Brian Michael Bendis' autobiographical graphic novel Fortune and Glory, which follows Bendis' exploits when Hollywood comes calling to adapt one of his works into a film.

== Filmography ==
=== Film ===
Year	Title	Director	Producer
1995	Things to Do in Denver When You're Dead	Yes	No
1997	Kiss the Girls	Yes	No
2001	Don't Say a Word	Yes	No
2001	Impostor	Yes	Yes
2003	Runaway Jury	Yes	Yes
2008	The Express: The Ernie Davis Story	Yes	No
2013	Homefront	Yes	No

=== Executive producer ===
- Pearl (2020)

=== Television ===
Year	Title	Director	Executive Producer	Notes
1992–1993	Tales from the Crypt	Yes	No	2 episodes
1997	Homicide: Life on the Street	Yes	No	1 episode
1998	From the Earth to the Moon	Yes	No	1 episode
1998	L.A. Doctors	Yes	Consulting	3 episodes
2000	Falcone	Yes	No	1 episode
2002	Going to California	Yes	No	1 episode
2002	The Shield	Yes	No	1 episode
2005	Blind Justice	Yes	No	3 episodes
2006	The Evidence	Yes	Yes	2 episodes
2007–2008	October Road	Yes	Yes	6 episodes
2008	Life on Mars	Yes	No	1 episode
2010	Happy Town	Yes	Yes	2 episodes
2010	Life Unexpected	Yes	Yes	5 episodes
2012	The River	Yes	No	1 episode
2012	Vegas	Yes	No	1 episode
2012–2014	Beauty & the Beast	Yes	Yes	1 episode
2014	Star-Crossed	Yes	Yes	2 episodes
2014	Scorpion	Yes	No	1 episode
2014–2016	Kingdom	Yes	No	5 episodes
2015	Turn: Washington's Spies	Yes	No	1 episode
2015	The Art of More	Yes	Yes	2 episodes
2016	Guilt	Yes	No	2 episodes
2016–2017	Zoo	Yes	No	2 episodes
2017	The Bold Type	Yes	Yes	1 episode
2020	Lincoln Rhyme: Hunt for the Bone Collector	Yes	No	2 episodes
2020	Tiny Pretty Things	Yes	Yes	2 episodes
2025	Reacher	Yes	No	1 episode

=== TV movies ===
Year	Title	Director	Producer	Notes
1992	Air Time	Yes	Yes	
1994	The Companion	Yes	No	
2002	R.U.S./H.	Yes	No	failed TV pilot
2008	Finnegan	Yes	No	failed TV pilot
2010	Boston's Finest	Yes	No	failed TV pilot
2011	Identity	Yes	No	failed TV pilot
2014	Identity	Yes	No	failed TV pilot
2015	Evil Men	Yes	Executive	failed TV pilot
2017	Salamander	Yes	No	failed TV pilot
2017	A Midsummer's Nightmare	Yes	Executive	

== Unrealized projects ==
- Pinball, based on the novel by Jerzy Kosiński, with Guinevere Turner as writer
- Trillion, a sports drama starring Edward Burns set up at New Line Cinema
- Max and Barry, a dark comedy about hoaxes on talk shows, was set up at New Line Cinema
- Piece of My Heart, a biopic about Janis Joplin for Lakeshore Entertainment
- Five Killers Killing, a crime thriller about five British assassins taking down an assassin on their turf, was set up at Sony Pictures
- Darkling Cove, a thriller about a woman discovering a crime, set up at 20th Century Fox
- Protection, a thriller written by Allan Loeb about a college professor investigating the disappearance of his wife and daughter, was set up at 20th Century Fox
- The Bayou, a crime thriller starring Joey King, Gary Oldman, and Dylan O'Brien for Millennium Media
- Line of Control, an espionage thriller
- Poker Face
- Papa Alpha Heavy
- Sacrament, a revenge thriller
- True Haunting, a supernatural horror film set up at Screen Gems, starring Erin Moriarty and Jamie Campbell Bower
- A Guy Walks Into a Bar, a dark comedy starring Kumail Nanjiani and Sam Rockwell and written by Scott Rosenberg
- Just Play Dead
