= 1961 All-Eastern football team =

American all-star college football team

The 1961 All-Eastern football team consists of American football players chosen by various selectors as the best players at each position among the Eastern colleges and universities during the 1961 college football season.

The 1961 All-Eastern team included 1961 Heisman Trophy winner Ernie Davis of Syracuse.

== Backs ==
- Ernie Davis, Syracuse (AP-1; UPI-1)
- Al Rushatz, Army (AP-1; UPI-1)
- Pat McCarthy, Holy Cross (AP-1; UPI-2)
- Steve Simms, Rutgers (AP-1; UPI-2)
- Galen Hall, Penn State (AP-2; UPI-1)
- Roger Kochman, Penn State (UPI-1)
- Fred Cox, Pittsburgh (AP-2; UPI-3)
- Tom Hennessey, Holy Cross (AP-2; UPI-2)
- Harry Crump, Boston College (AP-2)
- Tom Haggerty, Columbia (UPI-2)
- Bill King, Dartmouth (UPI-3)
- Russ Warren, Columbia (UPI-3)
- Rick Leeson, Pittsburgh (UPI-3)

== Ends ==
- Robert Mitinger, Penn State (AP-1; UPI-1)
- Greg Mather, Navy (AP-1; UPI-1)
- Dave Viti, Boston University (AP-2; UPI-2)
- John Mackey, Syracuse (AP-2; UPI-3)
- John Ellerson, Army (UPI-2)
- John Sikorski, Boston College (UPI-3)

== Tackles ==
- Bob Asack, Columbia (AP-1; UPI-1)
- John Brown, Syracuse (AP-2; UPI-1)
- Dale Kuhns, Army (AP-1)
- Jim Smith, Penn State (AP-2)
- Gary Kaltenbach, Pittsburgh (UPI-2)
- Mike Semcheski, Lehigh (UPI-2)
- Pete Perreault, Boston University (UPI-3)
- Ron Testa, Navy (UPI-3)

== Guards ==
- Larry Vignali, Pittsburgh (AP-1; UPI-1)
- John Hewitt, Navy (AP-1)
- John Timper, Holy Cross (UPI-1)
- Richie Ross, Villanova (AP-2; UPI-2)
- Mike Casp, Army (AP-2; UPI-3)
- Stu Benedict, Colgate (UPI-2)
- Bill Swinford, Harvard (UPI-3)

== Center ==
- Alex Kroll, Rutgers (AP-1; UPI-1)
- Jay Huffman, Penn State (AP-2; UPI-3)
- Bob Stern, Syracuse (UPI-2)

== Key ==
- AP = Associated Press
- UPI = United Press International

== See also ==
- 1961 College Football All-America Team
