= Barbara Albom =

American basketball player

Career information
- High school: Herricks (Searingtown, New York)
- College: Penn (1980–1984)

Career highlights
- All-Ivy League (1984)

Barbara Albom is an American former basketball player. As a member of the Penn Quakers women's basketball team she earned All-Ivy League honors in 1984 and was the team's MVP for the 1984 season. She was later inducted into the Philadelphia Jewish Sports Hall of Fame and the Philadelphia Big Five Hall of Fame.

== Early life ==
Albom is a native of Long Island, New York and played high school basketball at Herricks High School.

== Playing career ==
Albom played for the Penn Quakers women's basketball team from 1980 to 1984. In 1984, Albom was Penn women's basketball's most valuable player, leading the team in scoring, earning All-Ivy League and All-Big Five team honors. She represented the United States in the Maccabiah Games as a member of the U.S. Maccabiah women's basketball team in 1981 and 1984, winning a silver medal in 1984.

== Halls of fame ==
Albom is an inductee in the Philadelphia Jewish Sports Hall of Fame. In 1992 she was inducted into the Philadelphia Big Five Hall of Fame.
