= Benedict Coren =

American football player

Profile
- Position: Guard / Tackle

Personal information
- Born: March 3, 1924
- Died: April 24, 2018 (aged 94)
- Listed height: 6 ft 2 in (1.88 m)
- Listed weight: 245 lb (111 kg)

Career information
- High school: West (Philadelphia, Pennsylvania)
- College: Nevada (1943–1944); West Chester (1946–1947)

Career history
- Wilmington Clippers (1948)

Awards and highlights
- All-Pacific Coast (1944); Little All-America (1947); All-East Coast (1947)

Benedict Coren (March 3, 1924 – April 24, 2018) was an American former football player. He played college football at the University of Nevada, Reno and West Chester University. He played professionally for the Wilmington Clippers.

== Early life ==
Coren grew up in Philadelphia, Pennsylvania, beginning his football career at West Philadelphia High School in the early 1940s. Playing the guard position on the offensive line, Coren was a member of the West Philadelphia Speedboys' city high school championship team in 1942. He was also named an All-Public guard in high school.

== College career ==
Coren played football at Nevada in 1943 and 1944. At Nevada he was named an All-Pacific Coast center in 1944.

Coren transferred to West Chester University and played football there from 1946 to 1947.

In 1947, Coren earned Little All-America team honors while playing for West Chester, named a Little All-American guard, Honorable Mention All-American guard, All-East Coast, and All-State.

== Professional career ==
Coren played six games and started one as a professional football player, playing for the Wilmington Clippers of the American Football League as a tackle in 1948. The Clippers lost the 1948 AFL championship game to the Paterson Panthers 24–14.

== Post-playing career ==
Coren was both a professor and offensive coordinator for the football team at Cheyney University for 18 years. He was also a coach at West Chester High School and Sun Valley High School.

== Halls of fame ==
Coren has been inducted into several Halls of Fame, including the West Chester University Athletics Hall of Fame, Cheyney University Hall of Fame, Pennsylvania Sports Hall of Fame, Philadelphia Jewish Sports Hall of Fame, and Chester County Sports Hall of Fame.
