= Tom Hennessey =

American gridiron football player (1942–2012)

No. 30
- Position: Defensive back

Personal information
- Born: February 15, 1942; Boston, Massachusetts
- Died: July 22, 2012 (aged 70); Brookline, Massachusetts

Career information
- College: Holy Cross

Career history
- Boston Patriots (1965–1966)

Awards and highlights
- Second-team All-Eastern (1961); Third-team All-Eastern (1962)

Career statistics
- Interceptions: 8
- Stats at Pro Football Reference

Thomas Paul Hennessey (February 15, 1942 – July 22, 2012) was an American football defensive back in the American Football League. He played for the Boston Patriots. He played college football for the Holy Cross Crusaders.

== See also ==
- List of NCAA major college yearly punt and kickoff return leaders
