= Pete Leaness =

American soccer player, baseball player, and soccer coach

William P. Leaness
Personal information
- Date of birth: June 5, 1904
- Date of death: September 1, 1972 (aged 68)

College career
Years	Team	Apps	(Gls)
1925–1929	Temple Owls men's soccer		
1925–1929	Temple Owls baseball		

Managerial career
- 1930–1970: Temple Owls men's soccer

William P. "Pete" Leaness (July 5, 1904 – September 1972) was an American soccer player, baseball player, and soccer coach. He was an All-American in baseball and soccer at Temple University and later served as the men's soccer coach at Temple for over 40 years.

== Playing career ==
At Temple University, Leaness was an All-American player in both baseball and soccer. In 1929, he was honored as Temple's first All-American in soccer.

== Coaching career ==
Leaness was named head coach of the Temple Owls men's soccer team in 1930 and coached the team for 41 years until 1971. In his 41-year career as Temple soccer coach, he coached 36 All-Americans and earned 245 career victories. Temple recognizes two national championships in men's soccer under Leaness' leadership: 1951 and 1953. The 1951 championship came after winning the 1952 Soccer Bowl 2–1 over San Francisco. The 1953 national championship was voted on by the ISFL/ISFA.

== Halls of fame ==
Leaness is a member of the Philadelphia Jewish Sports Hall of Fame. He was a 1971 inductee in the Temple Athletics Hall of Fame.

He was inducted in 2005 to the United Soccer Coaches Hall of Fame.
