= Chuck Sieminski =

American football player (1940–2020)

No. 65, 77, 61
- Position: Defensive tackle

Personal information
- Born: July 3, 1939; Swoyersville, Pennsylvania, U.S.
- Died: May 16, 2020 (aged 79); Upper Chichester, Pennsylvania, U.S.
- Listed height: 6 ft 5 in (1.96 m)
- Listed weight: 250 lb (113 kg)

Career information
- High school: Swoyersville
- College: Penn State
- NFL draft: 1962: 4th round, 46th overall pick
- AFL draft: 1962: 14th round, 110th overall pick

Career history
- San Francisco 49ers (1963–1965); Atlanta Falcons (1966–1967); Detroit Lions (1968); Philadelphia Eagles (1970)*
- * Offseason or practice squad member only

Awards and highlights
- Third-team All-American (1962); First-team All-East (1962)

Career NFL statistics
- Fumble recoveries: 2
- Sacks: 7
- Stats at Pro Football Reference

Charles Lee Sieminski (July 3, 1940 – May 16, 2020) was an American football player who played for the San Francisco 49ers, the Detroit Lions and the Atlanta Falcons of the National Football League (NFL). He played college football at Penn State University. After his playing career was over, he served as a high school football coach and sports official in his native Northeastern Pennsylvania for many years.
