= Dave Viti =

American gridiron football player (1939–2023)

No. 73, 70
- Position: End

Personal information
- Born: September 28, 1939
- Died: June 2023 (aged 83)
- Listed height: 6 ft 2 in (1.88 m)
- Listed weight: 229 lb (104 kg)

Career information
- College: Boston University
- NFL draft: 1962: 9th round, 113th overall pick
- AFL draft: 1962: 6th round, 44th overall pick

Career history
- 1962–1969: Hamilton Tiger-Cats

Awards and highlights
- 3× Grey Cup champion (1963, 1965, 1967); Second-team All-Eastern (1961)

David M. Viti (September 28, 1939 – June 2023) was an American professional football player who was an end for the Hamilton Tiger-Cats of the Canadian Football League (CFL). He played college football for the Boston University Terriers and later professionally with the Tiger-Cats for eight seasons from 1962 to 1969. He helped Hamilton win three Grey Cup championships, in 1963, 1965 and 1967.

== Early life and education ==
Viti was born on September 28, 1939, and grew up in Fort Lauderdale, Florida. He attended Pleasant High School in Providence, Rhode Island, before transferring to Massanutten Military Academy. He began attending Boston University in 1958, majoring in science. Viti earned his first varsity letter in 1959, playing as an end for the Terriers. He was a starter by the 1960 season and played on both sides of the ball, receiving praise from coach Steve Sinko for being "the best blocking end on the team." He caught four passes for 72 yards in the 1959 season and 13 passes for 183 yards in 1960.

Viti had his best year as a senior in 1961, being the ninth-best receiver nationally through the first four games before suffering an injury. A feature story from Associated Press (AP) described him as one of the bright spots for the Boston team that won only one of their first five games, mentioning him as an "outstanding" candidate for All-New England and All-East honors. Sinko commented that Viti was the most well-liked player on the team and his position coach said that he was "the greatest two-way end I've ever had the pleasure of coaching." He finished the year with 16 catches for 243 yards and was named All-New England by United Press International (UPI) and AP, and was selected second-team All-East while being chosen to play in the Blue–Gray Football Classic. In his collegiate career, Viti totaled 33 catches for 498 yards and one touchdown.

== Professional career ==
Viti received interest from several professional teams during his college career and was pursued by teams from multiple leagues after he graduated. The Hamilton Tiger-Cats of the Canadian Football League (CFL) wanted him, the Buffalo Bills of the American Football League (AFL) selected him in the sixth round (44th overall) of the 1962 AFL draft, and the Washington Redskins of the National Football League (NFL) chose him in the ninth round (113th overall) of the 1962 NFL draft.

Viti had been noticed by the Tiger-Cats when future Canadian Football Hall of Famer Ralph Sazio went on a trip to scout a teammate of Viti's at Boston University. Sazio was so impressed with Viti that he immediately offered him a contract. He signed it, believing that it was a non-binding contract, i.e., if an American team drafted him (the contract was made prior to the AFL and NFL drafts) and made a better offer he would be able to play with them instead. However, when he was drafted by Buffalo and signed their offer, he was told that the Hamilton offer was binding and that he could only play with them.

Viti ended up playing with Hamilton. He appeared in nine games as a rookie, helping them reach the 50th Grey Cup while playing offensive end and additionally sometimes at tackle. There was controversy when Viti played at tackle, as he wore a number (73) that could not be worn by players at that position. The CFL commissioner Sydney Halter initially ruled that he would need to change his number and that he would only be able to play one position or the other, but later reversed his decision.

Viti caught 14 receptions for 206 yards with one touchdown in his nine games in 1962, and also scored a touchdown in the Grey Cup as Hamilton lost by one point to the Winnipeg Blue Bombers, in what would be the first of five championship appearances for him. The following season, he appeared in all 14 games and served as placekicker in addition to end. He helped them reach and win the 51st Grey Cup while totaling 27 catches for 361 yards with one score as a receiver, and converting four-of-eight field goals, 13-of-17 extra points and scoring one single as a kicker.

In subsequent seasons, Viti mainly played as a defensive end, making only one catch in 1964 and two the next year while playing all but two games. He helped them win another Grey Cup in 1965. In the late 1960s, Viti was a member of one of the best defensive lines in team history, which also featured Angelo Mosca, Billy Ray Locklin and John Barrow; the 1967 team did not allow any offensive touchdowns in the final six games and won the Grey Cup.

Viti saw more time on offense in his final two years, posting 12 receptions for 207 yards with one score in 1968 and 18 catches for 234 yards in 1969. He was waived prior to the 1970 season, which ended his career. He finished his career with 105 games played in eight seasons with the Tiger-Cats, appearing in every regular season game from 1965 to 1969. Viti totaled 84 receptions for 1,237 yards with four touchdowns and additionally made four fumble recoveries and one interception on defense.

== Death ==
Viti died in June 2023, aged 83.
