= Larry Goldsborough =

American basketball player

Personal information
- Listed height: 5 ft 10 in (1.78 m)
- Listed weight: 165 lb (75 kg)

Career information
- High school: Overbrook (Philadelphia, Pennsylvania)
- College: Cornell (1949–1952)
- NBA draft: 1952: undrafted
- Position: Guard

Larry J. Goldsborough is an American former basketball player. He played college basketball at Cornell University and is a member of the Philadelphia Jewish Sports Hall of Fame.

== Early life ==
A native of Philadelphia, Pennsylvania, Goldsborough attended Overbrook High School. In the late 1940s he was a three-year starter at Overbrook and, as captain, led the team to the Public League title in 1948. After his senior season he received the William Markward Award as the top player and scholar among Philadelphia high school basketball players. He was the second person to receive it.

== College career ==
Goldsborough attended Cornell University and played for the Big Red men's basketball team. He played the guard position. Goldsborough played three varsity seasons with Cornell, from 1949–50 through 1951–52. Playing under head coach Royner Greene, Goldsborough was a member of some of the best Cornell teams in program history. As of 2026, the 1950–51 team ranks as the fifth-most wins in a season in program history (20) while the 1949–50 team ranks tied for 8th all-time (18). At the time these were both team records.

== Later life ==
After two years in the United States Army, Goldsborough attended the University of Pennsylvania Law School and practiced law for over 40 years. He was later inducted into the Philadelphia Jewish Sports Hall of Fame.
