= Larry Friedman =

American basketball player

Personal information
- Listed height: 6 ft 2 in (1.88 m)

Career information
- High school: Central High School (Philadelphia)
- College: Muhlenberg (1951-1954)
- Position: Guard

Larry Friedman is an American basketball player. He played college basketball at Muhlenberg College in the 1950s and was inducted into Muhlenberg’s Athletics Hall of Fame in 1996.

== Early life ==
Friedman played high school basketball at Central High School. He is a native of Bala Cynwyd, Pennsylvania, a community on in the Philadelphia metropolitan area that is a part of the Philadelphia Main Line.

== Playing career ==
Friedman played college basketball at Muhlenberg College from 1951 to 1954. He was one of the best players of the 1950s at Muhlenberg where he was team MVP and led team in points and assists in 1952, 1953, and 1954. Friedman was also the third player in school history to reach 1,000 career points.

As of 2026, he still ranks 27th in Muhlenberg career scoring at 1,094 points, 9th in career points per game at 16.1 PPG, 8th in career total assists at 282, and 3rd in single season total assists at 168 (1951-52 season).

== Honors ==
Friedman is a member of the Philadelphia Jewish Sports Hall of Fame, inducted in 2007. He is a 1996 inductee into the Muhlenberg College Athletics Hall of Fame.
