= John Brown (offensive tackle) =

American football player (born 1939)

No. 70, 74
- Position: Offensive tackle

Personal information
- Born: June 9, 1939 (age 87); Camden, New Jersey, U.S.
- Listed height: 6 ft 2 in (1.88 m)
- Listed weight: 248 lb (112 kg)

Career information
- High school: Camden
- College: Syracuse
- NFL draft: 1961: 4th round, 55th overall pick
- AFL draft: 1961: 22nd round, 176th overall pick

Career history
- Cleveland Browns (1962–1966); Pittsburgh Steelers (1967–1971)

Awards and highlights
- NFL champion (1964); National champion (1959); First-team All-Eastern (1961)

Career NFL statistics
- Games played: 136
- Games started: 100
- Fumble recoveries: 2
- Stats at Pro Football Reference

John Calvin Brown Jr. (born June 9, 1939) is an American former professional football player who was a tackle for 11 seasons with the Cleveland Browns and Pittsburgh Steelers of the National Football League (NFL). He played college football for the Syracuse Orange.

Brown played high school football at Camden High School in his hometown. He played tackle at Syracuse University alongside Ernie Davis. They became close friends in college, which included a 1959 championship for the school, the only one in team history.

In 1961, Brown was selected by the San Diego Chargers and the Cleveland Browns. He did not play in the 1961 season. However, he chose to go to the Cleveland Browns to be teammates with Davis, who had been quickly traded to Cleveland when he refused to play for his draft team in the Washington Redskins. Davis never took the field in Cleveland in a pro game due to being diagnosed with leukemia in the summer of 1962, with Brown sharing a bungalow with him in Cleveland while Davis went through treatment in the hospital.

After his career ended, he became interested in banking, where he later rose to being an executive before retirement. Brown named his youngest son after Davis and had Marie Davis Fleming serve as the child's godmother. As of 2023, he lives in Pittsburgh.

In the 2008 movie The Express, the character of Jack Buckley (played by Omar Benson Miller), depicted as the best friend of Davis and his roommate, is based on Brown.
