= Whitney Weinraub =

American soccer player

Whitney Weinraub-Tucci
Personal information
- Place of birth: Holland, Pennsylvania, U.S.
- Position: Forward

Youth career
- 2003–2007: Council Rock South High School

College career
Years	Team	Apps	(Gls)
2007–2010	Charlotte 49ers		

Whitney Weinraub-Tucci also known as Whitney Weinraub or Whitney Tucci is an American former college soccer player. She was an All-American and Atlantic 10 offensive player of the year while playing for the Charlotte 49ers women's soccer team.

== High school career ==
A native of Holland, Pennsylvania, Weinraub-Tucci played high school soccer as a forward at Council Rock South High School. She had a stellar high school career in her four years with the Golden Hawks, scoring 60 goals, winning a state title, two regional titles, and three district titles.

== College career ==
Weinraub-Tucci played college soccer at the University of North Carolina Charlotte, beginning with her freshman year in 2007. As a freshman in 2007 she was named to the Jewish Sports Review's All-American team, Atlantic 10 Rookie of the Week, and was third on the team with 14 points at the end of the season.

As a sophomore in 2008, she was named the A-10 offensive player of the year, named to the first-team All-A-10 team, A-10 championship all-tournament team, and named again to the Jewish Sports Review's All-American team.

In 2009, her junior year at Charlotte, she was again named A-10 offensive player of the year for a second straight year. She was on the Jewish Sports Review's All-American team for a third straight year.

As a senior in 2010, she earned first team all-conference honors for a third straight year. She did not win a third consecutive A-10 offensive player of the year as it was awarded to Colleen Williams of University of Dayton.

== Honors and awards ==
Weinraub-Tucci is a member of the Philadelphia Jewish Sports Hall of Fame. She had her No. 6 jersey number retired with the Charlotte 49ers women's soccer team on September 2, 2018.

At the time of her graduation, she held the program records for goals, points, and game-winning goals for 49ers women's soccer.
