= Joe Blasenstein =

American football player

Profile
- Position: Offensive line (OL)

Personal information
- Born: 1941 (age 84–85)
- Listed height: 5 ft 11 in (1.80 m)
- Listed weight: 210 lb (95 kg)

Career information
- High school: West Philadelphia
- College: Penn State

Awards and highlights
- AP All-East Third Team (1961); AP and UPI All-America honorable mention (1962); AP All-East second team (1962); Lambert-Meadowlands Trophy (1961, 1962)

Joe Blasenstein (also spelled Joe Blasentine) is an American former football player. He played college football for Penn State and was an All-America honorable mention in 1962.

== Early life ==
Blasenstein attended West Philadelphia High School where he played football and settled on the position of offensive guard, winning All-Public and All-Interscholastic selections in 1957 and 1958.

== College career ==
In 1959, Blasenstein committed to play football at Penn State, spending his first season on the freshman team. He would go on to play in three bowl games with the Nittany Lions in 1960, 1961, and 1962. As a senior in 1962, Blasenstein earned Associated Press and United Press International All-America Honorable Mention and Associated Press All-East second team honors.

== Professional career ==
Blasenstein signed with the Harrisburg Capitols of the Atlantic Coast Football League in 1963.

== Halls of Fame ==
Blasenstein was inducted into the Philadelphia Jewish Sports Hall of Fame as part of the Class of 2007.
