= Pete Perreault =

American football player (1939–2001)

Profile
- Positions: Guard, Linebacker

Personal information
- Born: March 1, 1939; Shrewsbury, Massachusetts, U.S.
- Died: December 8, 2001 (aged 62); Graceville, Florida, U.S.

Career information
- College: Boston University
- NFL draft: 1963: undrafted

Career history
- New York Jets (1963–1967); Cincinnati Bengals (1968); New York Jets (1969); New York Jets (1970); Minnesota Vikings (1971)

Awards and highlights
- Third-team All-Eastern (1961)
- Stats at Pro Football Reference

Pete Perreault (March 1, 1939 – December 8, 2001) was an American football guard who played nine seasons of professional football. He played for the American Football League (AFL)'s New York Jets from 1963 through 1967, for the AFL's Cincinnati Bengals in 1968, then returned to the Jets in 1969. He also played for the National Football League (NFL)'s Jets in 1970 and the Minnesota Vikings in 1971.

Peter W. Perrault was born in Shrewsbury, Massachusetts. He attended Shrewsbury High School, Cheshire Academy and Boston University. He was inducted into the Shrewsbury High School Athletic Hall of Fame in 1991, and is remembered in the Peter Perreault Student/Athlete Of The Year Scholarship Award, presented each year since 2003.

== See also ==
- Other American Football League players
