= Gary Martin (lacrosse) =

American lacrosse player

Personal information
- Nationality: USA

Sport
- NCAA team: Penn State Nittany Lions
- NLL teams: Philadelphia Wings

Gary Martin is an American former lacrosse player. He was a two-time All-American for the Penn State Nittany Lions men's lacrosse team in college.

Professionally, Martin was a four-time champion as a player with the Philadelphia Wings of the National Lacrosse League.

== Early life ==
Martin is a native of Deer Park, New York. He attended Deer Park High School.

== College career ==
During his time with the Penn State Nittany Lions men's lacrosse in the 1980s, Martin was a player in college lacrosse. He was named an All-American in 1982 and 1983.

One of the greatest players in Penn State men's lacrosse history, Martin’s name still litters the record books as of the 2026 season. Martin remains tied for first for the single game assists record, recording nine assists on May 2, 1983 vs. Bucknell. He is first in the single game points record, with 14 points also on May 2, 1983 vs. Bucknell.

His historic 1982 season still ranks 10th all-time in Penn State single season records for goals scored (42), second all-time in assists (44), and third all-time in points (86).

== Professional career ==
After his college career, Martin played for the Philadelphia Wings of the National Lacrosse League. With the Wings, he won five championships, with four championships as a player (1989, 1990, 1994, 1995) and later one championship as a coach (1998).

== Halls of fame ==
Martin is a member of the Philadelphia Jewish Sports Hall of Fame.

In December 2025, it was announced that Martin was selected for the Penn State men's lacrosse Ring of Pride, the program's highest honor.
