= Criminal Activities =

2015 film by Jackie Earle Haley

- Theatrical release poster
- Directed by: Jackie Earle Haley
- Written by: Robert Lowell
- Produced by: Howard Burd; Wayne Allan Rice; Micah Sparks
- Starring: Michael Pitt; Dan Stevens; John Travolta; Edi Gathegi; Rob Brown; Jackie Earle Haley
- Cinematography: Seamus Tierney
- Edited by: Alex Marquez
- Music by: Keefus Ciancia
- Production companies: Capacity Pictures; May Day Movies; NeeNee Productions; Phoenix Rising Motion Pictures
- Distributed by: RLJ Entertainment; Image Entertainment
- Release date: November 20, 2015
- Running time: 94 minutes
- Country: United States
- Language: English
- Budget: $7 million

Criminal Activities is a 2015 American crime thriller film directed by Jackie Earle Haley in his directorial debut and written by Robert Lowell. The film stars Michael Pitt, Dan Stevens, John Travolta, Christopher Abbott, Edi Gathegi, Rob Brown, and Jackie Earle Haley. The film was released on November 20, 2015, by RLJ Entertainment and Image Entertainment.

== Plot ==
Four people invest borrowed money in a company guaranteed to return their venture capital tenfold or more. It does not bother them that the privileged information on which they are acting is derived from insider trading. Two things go wrong. The company suddenly folds under the pressure of federal scrutiny and their financial benefactor turns out to be a mid level, yet friendly mobster.

The mobster, named Eddie (John Travolta), offers them a way out of their awkward situation. They are to kidnap a man and hold a man for 24 hours before turning the man over to Eddie and his offsiders. This action will clear their massive debt with him, and everyone will cheerfully go their separate ways. But a couple more annoying things crop up. One of them is that the kidnap victim is related to a mob boss who offers a two million dollar reward to the first one to recover his nephew. Another one is that the four kidnappers are now required to each murder the victim before being allowed to leave the building.

Adding to these challenges is the fact that things are often not what they appear to be. Perceived motivations may differ slightly from actual ones, and what initially seems mundane usually is.

== Cast ==
- Michael Pitt as Zach
- Dan Stevens as Noah
- John Travolta as Eddie
- Rob Brown as Bryce
- Christopher Abbott as Warren
- Edi Gathegi as Marques
- Jackie Earle Haley as Gerry

== Production ==
=== Filming ===
The shooting of the film began on May 27, 2014 in Cleveland, Ohio and finished on June 26. A list of road closures was published by the news. Previously planned to be set in Detroit, it was eventually set in Cleveland.

== Release ==
The film was acquired by Image Entertainment for a planned fall 2015 release in the United States and the United Kingdom.

== Reception ==
Criminal Activities received mixed reviews. On Rotten Tomatoes, it holds a 50% score, and an average rating of 5.9/10, sampled from 20 reviews. Metacritic gives a score of 51 out of 100, based on 9 reviews, indicating "mixed or average" reviews.
