= Emma C. Chappell =

American banker (1941–2021)

- Born: Emma Carolyn Bayton; February 18, 1941; Philadelphia, Pennsylvania, U.S.
- Died: March 16, 2021 (aged 80); Philadelphia, Pennsylvania, U.S.
- Resting place: West Laurel Hill Cemetery, Bala Cynwyd, Pennsylvania, U.S.
- Education: West Philadelphia High School; Temple University; Rutgers University
- Known for: Banking and Community Service
- Children: 2

Emma Carolyn Chappell (née Bayton, February 18, 1941 – March 16, 2021) was an American banker who founded and was CEO of the United Bank of Philadelphia. She was the second African-American woman to found a bank in the US after Maggie L. Walker in 1903. She was the first African-American woman to found a full-service commercial bank in the US and the first female vice president of a major bank in the state of Pennsylvania. Her banking initiatives funded redevelopment in Philadelphia, minority- and women-owned businesses, and loans for lower-income residents to purchase homes.

She was treasurer for the Jesse Jackson 1984 presidential campaign, helped found his Rainbow Coalition, and was executive director of the Rainbow/PUSH Wall Street Project.

== Early life and education ==
Chappell was born in Philadelphia, Pennsylvania, on February 18, 1941, to Emma and George Bayton. Her mother died when Chappell was 14 years old and she was raised by her father. She attended West Philadelphia High School and was a member of Zion Baptist Church. Her pastor, Rev. Leon Sullivan, a leader in the Philadelphia civil rights movement, recognized her mathematical skills after giving her an aptitude test and encouraged her to work in a banking career.

She received a bachelors degree from Temple University in 1967 and a master's degree from the Stonier Graduate School of Banking at Rutgers University. Her master's degree thesis was titled "A Banking Strategy for Minority Business Development". She received five honorary degrees.

== Career ==
She began her career as a bank clerk at Continental Bank and held other roles such as credit specialist for loan reviews. In 1967, Chappell entered the executive training program and was promoted to assistant treasurer in 1971 after completing the program. By 1977, she had become Continental Bank's first African American vice president. She was the first female vice president of a major bank in Pennsylvania.

Chappell was in charge of the Community Business Loan and Development Department for loans to minority-owned and women-owned small businesses. She granted over $30 million in loans to black-owned businesses. In 1974, she was one of the organizers of the Philadelphia Commercial Development Corporation which helped rebuild Philadelphia through commercial loans. She was a founder of the Delaware Valley Mortgage Plan which helped lower income residents purchase homes.

She took a leave of absence from the bank in 1984 to serve as national treasurer for Jesse Jackson's presidential campaign and helped found Jackson's Rainbow Coalition.

In 1987, a group of prominent black Philadelphians approached Chappell with the possibility of starting a black-controlled bank. They contributed $600,000, but were delayed by the stock market crash of October 1987. In 1992, after a five-year effort to raise the $5 million required by Pennsylvania regulators in order to capitalize a bank, Chappell founded the United Bank of Philadelphia. She raised $3 million from the black community by selling shares in $500 blocks, and raised another $3 million from big investors, resulting in $1 million more than was required. This made her the second African-American woman to found a bank since Maggie L. Walker did in 1903, and the first African-American woman to found a full-service commercial bank in the United States. At that time, the United Bank of Philadelphia was the only commercial, bank owned by African-Americans north of the Mason-Dixon line. The last African-American owned bank in Philadelphia, Citizens & Southern National Bank, had gone out of business in 1956.

She created the United Bank of Philadelphia with intentions to foster community development by providing quality, personalized, comprehensive banking services to businesses and individuals in Philadelphia. The bank expanded through the purchase of six branches from the Resolution Trust Corporation and grew from one location with deposits of $18 million to seven locations and deposits of $87.2 million. In 1994, United Bank of Philadelphia was named financial company of the year by Black Enterprise. By 1997, the bank had $106 million in assets, issued their own credit cards, and partnered with American Express to offer financial investment advice. In 1999, in recognition of the bank's exponential growth, the United Bank received the coveted Blue Chip Enterprises Award, sponsored by Mass Mutual and the United States Chamber of Commerce.

Chappell left the bank in 2000 in what looked like a voluntary decision. However, in 2001, the United Bank of Philadelphia sued her and it was revealed that she was asked to leave and accused of fraudulent real estate deals, charging employees exorbitant parking fees, and charging the bank for her limousine and parking fees. She settled the lawsuit and as part of the agreement was required to remain silent about what happened.

She served as executive director for the Rainbow/PUSH Wall Street Project which promoted financial firms to hire minorities. She help found the Black Women's Leadership Council of Philadelphia and co-hosted a radio program on WURD with the same name. She was appointed by President Clinton to serve as a member of the board of directors of the Southern African Enterprise Development Fund and the board of trustees of the Malcolm Baldrige National Quality Award.

Chappell spearheaded a program "Passport 2000" to introduce 2000 students to savings and money management as the key to economic independence. In 2015, she was appointed to the transition team of Pennsylvania Governor Tom Wolf as a financial advisor.

She was a member of the American Bankers Association, the National Bankers Association, and an honorary member of Alpha Kappa Alpha. She received numerous recognitions for her achievements including from BlackBook magazine, the National Association of Colored Women's Clubs, the North Philadelphia branch of the NAACP, the Philadelphia Police Department, and the Society for Advancement of Management.

Chappell died on March 16, 2021, due to sepsis and was interred at West Laurel Hill Cemetery in Bala Cynwyd, Pennsylvania.

== Personal life ==
She married Verdayne Chappell on May 7, 1960. They had two children but later divorced.

== Legacy ==
In 2025, the 700 block of Market Street in Philadelphia was named Emma Chappell Way in her honor.
