= Dan Wigrizer =

American lacrosse player

Personal information
- Nationality: USA
- Born: Villanova, Pennsylvania, U.S.

Sport
- Position: Goalie
- NCAA team: Duke

Dan Wigrizer is an American former college lacrosse player. Wigrizer was a high school All-American and won two national championships in 2010 and 2013 as a member of the Duke Blue Devils men's lacrosse team. In 2010 he became the sixth true freshman starting goalie to win a national title.

== Early life ==
Wigrizer is a native of Villanova, Pennsylvania. He attended the Haverford School where he was a star lacrosse goalie and was a 4-year letter winner and High School All-American. He was the 2009 Delaware County Player of the Year.

== Career ==
Wigrizer attended Duke University and played for the Duke Blue Devils men's lacrosse team. With the Blue Devils, Wigrizer as a freshman helped Duke to the program's first-ever national title in 2010 at the 2010 NCAA Division I men's lacrosse tournament. He became the sixth true freshman starting goalie to win a national championship.

As a sophomore in 2011, Wigrizer started 17 games as goalie with a 9.20 goals against average. The Blue Devils attempt at going back-to-back ended after a 9–4 loss to Maryland in the Final 4 of the 2011 NCAA Division I men's lacrosse tournament.

In his junior year in 2012 he started 14 games and helped Duke to a 15–5 record. For the second straight year, Duke's season ended with a Final 4 loss to Maryland in the 2012 NCAA Division I men's lacrosse tournament.

Wigrizer started six games in his senior season in 2013 before suffering a career-ending injury. Duke went on to win the national championship in the 2013 NCAA Division I men's lacrosse tournament, earning Wigrizer his second NCAA championship despite not playing in the tournament.

== Awards and honors ==
Wigrizer is a member of the Philadelphia Jewish Sports Hall of Fame.
