= Bernie Lemonick =

American football player and football coach

Personal information
- Born: 1928
- Died: February 13, 2015; Jenkintown, Pennsylvania

Career information
- High school: Olney (Olney)
- College: Penn (1948–1950)
- NFL draft: 1951: 21st round, 254th overall pick

Career history
- St. Joseph's Prep (1951–1954) Defensive line coach; Penn (1955–1959) Defensive line coach

Awards and highlights
- As a player: First-team All-American (1950)

Bernard Lemonick (1928 – February 13, 2015) was an American football player and football coach. He was an All-American football player at Penn, playing for the Quakers from 1948 to 1950. After his playing career, he coached as an assistant coach and defensive line coach at Penn.

== Early life ==
Lemonick was a native of Philadelphia, Pennsylvania. Lemonick was an all-public guard at Olney High School in the Olney neighborhood in Philadelphia.

== College career ==
Lemonick was a First Team All-America selection while on the University of Pennsylvania football team in the late 1940s and early 1950s. Playing at Penn from 1948-1950, he was one of the best linemen in the country while being named to several All-America teams.

== Professional career ==
Lemonick was selected by the New York Giants in the 1951 NFL draft with the 254th overall pick in the 21st round. He never appeared in an NFL game.

== Coaching career ==
Lemonick was an assistant football coach at Penn for five seasons and was a defensive line coach. He helped Penn football win its first Ivy League title in 1959.

== Halls of fame ==
Lemonick is a member of the Philadelphia Jewish Sports Hall of Fame. He was a 1996 inductee into the Penn Athletics Hall of Fame.

== Death ==
Lemonick died on February 13, 2015 at his home in Jenkintown, Pennsylvania. He died of complications from Alzheimer’s disease.
