= Al Laverson =

American soccer player, soccer coach, and tennis coach

Personal information
- Date of birth: June 7, 1920
- Date of death: August 2, 2014 (aged 94)

College career
Years	Team	Apps	(Gls)
1938–1940, 1946	Temple Owls		

Managerial career
- 1948–1991: Drexel Dragons men's soccer (assistant)
- 1961–1993: Drexel Dragons men's tennis

Albert “Al” Laverson (June 7, 1920 – August 2, 2014) was an American soccer player, soccer coach, and tennis coach. Laverson was an All-American soccer player at Temple (1938–1940, 1946). He was an assistant coach for the Drexel Dragons men's soccer team for 43 years and the head coach of Drexel Dragons men's tennis team for 32 years.

== Playing career ==
Leaverson was an All-American soccer player at Temple University. He played as a center midfielder in 1939 and 1940 before going on to serve in the US Army in World War II from 1941-1945, returning in 1946 and being named to the All-America team selected by the National Soccer Coaches Association of America.

== Coaching career ==
Laverson was the men's tennis coach at Drexel University for 32 years and an assistant soccer coach for 43 years.

He was the men's tennis head coach at Drexel for 32 years from 1961–1993. Drexel tennis joined the Division I level in 1974 and Laverson coached the team for 19 more seasons until 1993. At the DI level, he finished with a 62–159–1 record.

Laverson was an assistant coach for the Drexel Dragons men's soccer team for 43 years, coaching under head coach Don Yonker for 29 years and under Johnson Bowie for 14 years. In 1958, he was on the coaching staff for the 1958 national tournament team.

== Halls of fame ==
Laverson is a member of the Philadelphia Jewish Sports Hall of Fame. He was a 1996 inductee into the Drexel University Athletics Hall of Fame
