= Roger Kochman =

American football player (born 1941)

No. 45
- Position: Running back

Personal information
- Born: June 16, 1941 (age 85); Pittsburgh, Pennsylvania, U.S.
- Listed height: 6 ft 2 in (1.88 m)
- Listed weight: 205 lb (93 kg)

Career information
- College: Penn State
- NFL draft: 1962: 4th round, 47th overall pick
- AFL draft: 1962: 15th round, 116th overall pick

Career history
- Buffalo Bills (1963)

Awards and highlights
- First-team All-American (1962); 2× First-team All-Eastern (1961, 1962)

Career AFL statistics
- Rushing yards: 232
- Rushing average: 4.9
- Receptions: 4
- Receiving yards: 148
- Total touchdowns: 1
- Stats at Pro Football Reference

Roger Kochman (Pronounced: KAFF-man) (born June 16, 1941) is an American former professional football player who was a running back for the Buffalo Bills of the American Football League (AFL). He played college football for the Penn State Nittany Lions, earning first-team All-American honors as a halfback in 1962. He played one season with the Bills in 1963, accumulating 232 yards in 47 rushing attempts with 4 receptions for 148 yards and a touchdown.

== See also ==
- Other American Football League players
