= Floyd Little =

American football player (1942–2021)

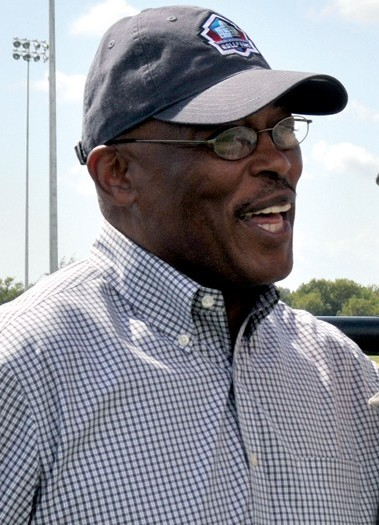
- Little in 2012

No. 44
- Position: Halfback

Personal information
- Born: July 4, 1942; New Haven, Connecticut, U.S.
- Died: January 1, 2021 (aged 78); Henderson, Nevada, U.S.
- Listed height: 5 ft 10 in (1.78 m)
- Listed weight: 196 lb (89 kg)

Career information
- High school: Hillhouse (New Haven)
- College: Syracuse (1964–1966)
- NFL draft: 1967: 1st round, 6th overall pick

Career history
- Denver Broncos (1967–1975)

Awards and highlights
- First-team All-Pro (1969); 5× Pro Bowl (1968–1971, 1973); NFL rushing yards leader (1971); NFL rushing touchdowns co-leader (1973); Denver Broncos Ring of Fame; Denver Broncos No. 44 retired; 3× First-team All-American (1964–1966); Nils V. "Swede" Nelson Award (1966); 3× First-team All-East (1964–1966); Syracuse Orange No. 44 retired

Career NFL statistics
- Rushing yards: 6,323
- Rushing average: 3.9
- Rushing touchdowns: 43
- Receptions: 215
- Receiving yards: 2,418
- Receiving touchdowns: 9
- Stats at Pro Football Reference
- Pro Football Hall of Fame
- College Football Hall of Fame

Floyd Douglas Little (July 4, 1942 – January 1, 2021) was an American professional football player who was a halfback for the Denver Broncos, initially in the American Football League (AFL) and later the National Football League (NFL). He played college football for the Syracuse Orangemen, twice earning All-American honors. Little was the sixth overall selection of the 1967 NFL/AFL draft, the first common draft. He was the first first-round draft pick to sign with the AFL's Broncos, where he was known as "the Franchise". Little was elected to the College Football Hall of Fame in 1983 and the Pro Football Hall of Fame in 2010.

== Early life ==
Little was born in New Haven, Connecticut, on July 4, 1942. He attended the Hillhouse High School in New Haven and the Bordentown Military Institute in Bordentown, New Jersey.

== College career ==
Little was recruited by Gen. Douglas MacArthur to play football at the United States Military Academy and had told him that he'd ascend to the rank of general if he enrolled at West Point. He was also recruited by the University of Notre Dame. Little ultimately chose to attend Syracuse University at the persuasion of the first African-American Heisman Trophy winner, Ernie Davis. Little would inherit the number 44 jersey from Davis and would add to that number's legacy as the only three-time All-American running back to have played for the Orange.

Little played for Syracuse for three seasons. In 1964 he made 157 carries for 874 yards and nine touchdowns and 17 catches for 257 yards and 1 touchdown. In 1965 he made 193 carries for 1,065 yards and 14 touchdowns and 21 catches for 248 yards and one touchdown. In 1966 he made 162 carries for 811 yards and 12 touchdowns and 13 catches for 86 yards and two touchdowns. Little finished fifth in Heisman Trophy voting in both 1965 and 1966.

== Professional career ==
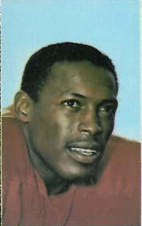
1969 Glendale stamp of Little

In his rookie year, he was elected a team captain; he would be the last Broncos rookie to do so until Bo Nix in 2024.

In 1975, Little retired as the NFL's seventh all-time leading rusher with 6,323 yards rushing and 54 total touchdowns (rushing, receiving and returns). He also threw a touchdown pass to receiver Jerry Simmons in a 1972 upset over the Oakland Raiders. During his rookie year, Little led the AFL in punt returns with a 16.9-yard average. He led the AFL in combined yards in 1967 and 1968. Little was Denver Broncos' team captain in all of his nine seasons with the team, including his rookie campaign.

Little was a charter member of the Broncos' Ring of Fame in 1984, which also included; Rich Jackson, Lionel Taylor, and Goose Gonsoulin. He was the first Bronco to win a rushing title, leading the AFC in rushing in 1970 with 901 yards and the following year he became the first Bronco to eclipse 1,000 yards, gaining 1,133 to lead the NFL. Little was the first player to lead his conference in rushing for a last-place team and the 13th player ever in professional football to rush for at least 1,000 yards in one season. He was an American Football League All-Star in 1968. In a week 12 win over Buffalo, he caught four passes out of the backfield for 165 yards, including a 66-yard touchdown, setting a franchise record of 41.25 yards per reception, which still stands. He was named first-team "All-AFL" in 1969, and made the AFC-NFC Pro Bowl in 1970, 1971, and 1973. At 5′10″ and 195 pounds, Little was the smallest back to lead the league in rushing since World War II. He led the league in combined yards in 1967 and 1968 and was the only player to return punts for touchdowns in both seasons. During a six-year period (1968–1973), Little rushed for more yards and more yards from scrimmage (rushing and receiving) than any running back in the NFL.

Little acquired his nickname "the Franchise" because his decision to sign with the AFL's Broncos was credited with generating sufficient fan interest to keep the team from relocating in the 1960s, and with helping to convince Denver voters to approve funding for the purchase and expansion of Mile High Stadium.

In 2005, Little was named to the Professional Football Researchers Association Hall of Very Good in the association's third HOVG class.

In 2009, Little was a finalist for induction into the Pro Football Hall of Fame. He was voted in on February 6, 2010, his induction took place in Canton, Ohio, on August 7, 2010. Little is one of five players in the Super Bowl era to make the Hall of Fame without ever playing a postseason game.

From July 2011 to June 2016, Little served as the special assistant to the athletic director at Syracuse University.

== Awards and honors ==
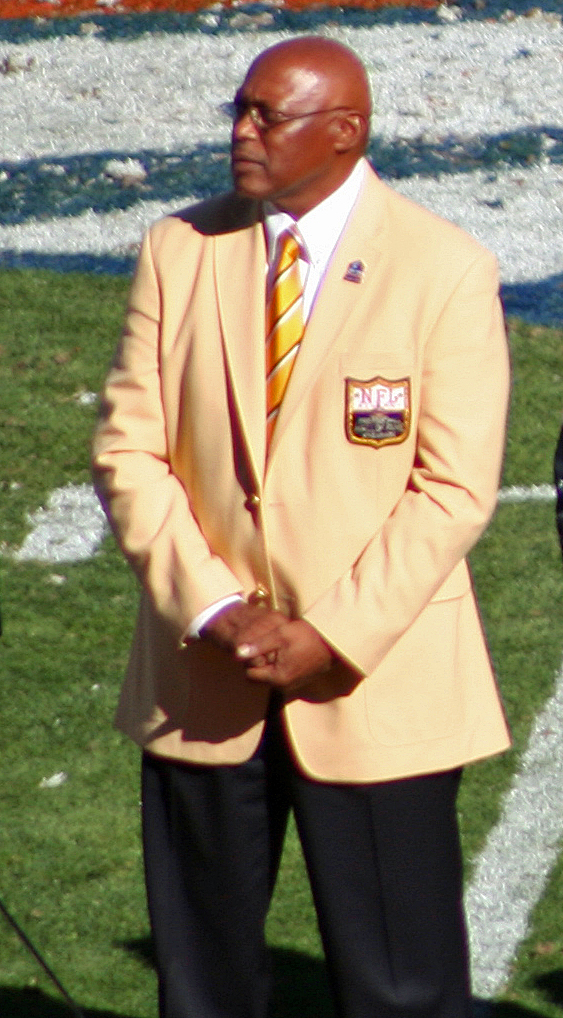
Little during the ceremony of induction to the Pro Football Hall of Fame in August 2010

Little's jersey number, 44, was retired by the Broncos in 1975 in his honor and by the Syracuse football program on November 12, 2005, to honor Little, Ernie Davis, and Jim Brown, and the eight other players who wore the number. Little was inducted into the College Football Hall of Fame in 1983. He was inducted into the Denver Broncos' Ring of Fame on October 1, 1984.

On August 7, 2010, Little was inducted into the Pro Football Hall of Fame alongside Jerry Rice, Emmitt Smith, Russ Grimm, Rickey Jackson, John Randle, and Dick LeBeau. On September 15, 2011, the New Haven Athletic Center, billed as the largest scholastic athletics facility in New England, was renamed the Floyd Little Athletic Center. On May 15, 2016, Little received his honorary doctorate from Syracuse University in Humane Letters. On May 17, 2019, Little was awarded the University of Denver's Distinguished Alumni Award and on May 18, 2019, Little was awarded an Honorary Doctorate of Laws as speaker at DU's Sturm College of Law's commencement ceremonies. Syracuse's football practice facility has a bronze statue of Little alongside Jim Brown and Ernie Davis.

== Personal life ==
Little lived with his wife DeBorah in Las Vegas. Little finished 40th in his class of 140 at the University of Denver law school, from which he received his master's degree in legal administration in 1975. Little owned automobile dealerships in Denver, the Seattle area and Santa Barbara. In May 2020, his former Syracuse teammate Pat Killorin announced that Little had been fighting cancer.

His grand nephew, J. Michael Sturdivant, plays wide receiver for the Green Bay Packers.

Little died on January 1, 2021, at the age of 78.

== Career statistics ==
Year	Team	GP	Rushing				Receiving			
Year	Team	GP	Att	Yds	Avg	TD	Rec	Yds	Avg	TD
1967	DEN	13	130	381	2.9	1	7	11	1.6	0
1968	DEN	11	158	584	3.7	3	19	331	17.4	1
1969	DEN	9	146	729	5.0	6	19	218	11.5	1
1970	DEN	14	209	901	4.3	3	17	161	9.5	0
1971	DEN	14	284	1,133	4.0	6	26	255	9.8	0
1972	DEN	14	216	859	4.0	9	28	367	13.1	4
1973	DEN	14	256	979	3.8	12	41	423	10.3	1
1974	DEN	14	117	312	2.7	1	29	344	11.9	0
1975	DEN	14	125	445	3.6	2	29	308	10.6	2
Career		117	1,641	6,323	3.9	43	215	2,418	11.2	9

== Legacy ==
Floyd Little is portrayed by actor Chadwick Boseman in the 2008 Universal Pictures film The Express: The Ernie Davis Story, a biographical film about Syracuse University Heisman Trophy winner Ernie Davis.

== See also ==
- List of NCAA major college yearly punt and kickoff return leaders
- List of American Football League players
