= Philadelphia Jewish Sports Hall of Fame =

Sports hall of fame

- Abbreviation: PJSHOF
- Formation: 1997
- Type: Hall of Fame
- Region served: Philadelphia, PA, U.S.
- Website: https://phillyjewishsports.org/

The Philadelphia Jewish Sports Hall of Fame is the Philadelphia hall of fame for Jewish athletes and special contributors to the world of sport from the Greater Philadelphia area. The Hall of Fame was founded in 1997 by Harvey Brodsky, Sam Rabinowitz, and William Steerman.

The Philadelphia Jewish Sports Hall of Fame Museum, also known as the Adolph & Rose Levis Museum, is located in Wynnewood, PA.

The Hall of Fame inductees include 18 Olympians, six Olympic medal winners, two world boxing champions, and several college All-Americans. Among the most notable inductees are NBA and NCAA champion Larry Brown and Super Bowl champion Randy Grossman.

== Notable Inductees ==
=== Olympians ===
- Cliff Bayer, fencing
- Larry Brown, basketball
- Don Cohan, sailing
- Steve Cohen, gymnast
- Ken Dreyfuss, rowing
- Samuel N. Gerson, wrestling
- Arie Gluck, track and field
- Samuel Goldstein, swimming
- Mike Koplove, baseball
- Samuel Mattis, track and field
- Dave Mayor, weight lifting
- Dave Micahnik, fencing
- Irv Mondschein, decathlon
- Chris O’Loughlin, fencing
- Allen Rosenberg, rowing
- Ed Sabol, swimming
- Frank Spellman, weightlifting
- Fred Turoff, gymnast

=== All-Americans ===
- Joe Blasenstein, football
- Tal Brody, basketball
- Colby Cohen, hockey
- Josh Cohen, tennis
- Benedict Coren, football
- Menchy Goldblatt, basketball
- Carol Schultz Greenberg, lacrosse
- Randy Grossman, football
- Al Laverson, soccer
- William P. Leaness, soccer
- Bernie Lemonick, football
- Chad Levitt, football
- Gary Martin, lacrosse
- Tracy Nelson, lacrosse
- Chris O’Loughlin, fencing
- Bonnie Rosen, lacrosse
- Dolph Schayes, basketball
- Whitney Tucci, soccer
- Dan Wigrizer, lacrosse
- Marty Zippel, basketball

=== Basketball ===
- Barbara Albom
- Steve Bilsky
- Nelson Bobb
- Mel Brodsky
- Tal Brody
- Bob Brooks
- Larry Brown
- Bryan Cohen
- Fred Cohen
- Sam Cozen
- Glenn Fine
- Larry Friedman
- Lexie Gerson
- Menchy Goldblatt
- Joe Goldenberg
- Larry Goldsborough
- Eddie Gottlieb
- Carol Schultz Greenberg
- Norm Grekin
- Sam Jacobs
- Jimmy Kieserman
- Louis "Red" Klotz
- Howie Landa
- Howard Lassoff
- Bruce Lefkowitz
- Ed Lerner
- Harry Litwack
- Barry Love
- Jules Love
- Brandi Butler Millis
- Cecil Mosenson
- Jeff Neuman
- Stan Novak
- Harvey Pollack
- Dan Promislo
- Harold Reinfeld
- Richie Richman
- Petey Rosenberg
- Dolph Schayes
- Brian Schiff
- Alan Stein
- Moe Tener
- Sol Tollin
- Rich Yankowitz
- Marty Zippel

=== Football ===
- Joe Blasenstein
- Larry Cardonick
- Ron Cohen
- Ben Coren
- Randy Grossman
- Bernie Lemonick
- Chad Levitt
- Brent Novoselsky
- Richie Richman
- Richard Rosenbleeth
- Larry Shane
- Morton Shiekman
- Steve Shull
- Sonny Slosburg
- Leonard Tose
- Jerry Wolman

=== Sportscasters ===
- Jeff Asch
- Michael Barkann
- Carl Cherkin
- Howard Eskin
- Merrill Reese
- Marc Zumoff

=== Sports Media ===
- Buzz Bissinger
- Frank Dolson
- Mel Greenberg
- Stan Hochman
- Phil Jasner
- Andrea Kremer
- Franz Lidz
- Glen Macnow
- Al Meltzer
- Marc Rayfield
- Merrill Reese
- Ed Sabol
- Steve Sabol
- Jon Slobotkin
- Jayson Stark
- Michael Tollin
- Dave Zinkoff
