= Tracy Nelson (lacrosse player) =

American lacrosse player and coach

Personal information
- Nationality: USA
- Born: Plymouth Meeting, Pennsylvania, U.S.

Sport
- Position: Goalkeeper
- NCAA team: Virginia Cavaliers

Tracy Nelson is an American former college lacrosse player and lacrosse coach. She was an All-American goalkeeper at the University of Virginia.

== Career ==
Nelson played lacrosse at Plymouth Whitemarsh High School and was named team MVP in 1985.

Nelson went on to play college lacrosse for the Virginia Cavaliers women's lacrosse team. With the Cavaliers, she was a three-year starter at goalkeeper and team captain, helping Virginia to the NCAA Final Four in 1986-1989. She was an All-American at Virginia in 1989.

From 1990-1993, Nelson was an assistant coach at her alma mater Virginia. She was on the coaching staff for the Cavaliers women's lacrosse national championship in 1991. She was the lacrosse head coach at The Baldwin School and later assistant coach and head coach at Episcopal Academy.

Nelson was a member of the United States women's national lacrosse team from 1989-1991.

Nelson was then a math teacher and middle school athletic director at The Haverford School. She joined the Haverford Middle School in 1995 and worked there for 27 years until her departure in June 2022.

== Awards and honors ==
In 2002, Nelson was named to the ACC's 50th anniversary women's lacrosse team.

Nelson is a member of the Philadelphia Jewish Sports Hall of Fame.
