= Ernie Davis =

American football player (1939–1963)

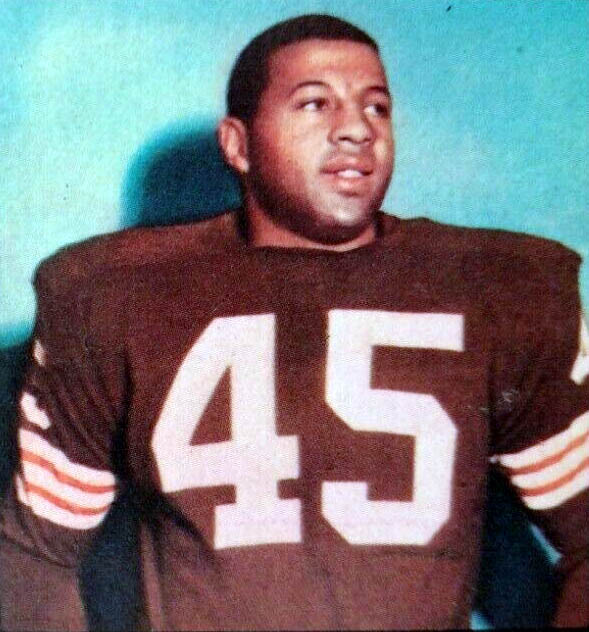
- Davis with the Cleveland Browns in 1962

No. 45
- Position: Halfback

Personal information
- Born: December 14, 1939; New Salem, Pennsylvania, U.S.
- Died: May 18, 1963 (aged 23); Cleveland, Ohio, U.S.
- Listed height: 6 ft 2 in (1.88 m)
- Listed weight: 210 lb (95 kg)

Career information
- High school: Elmira Free (Elmira, New York)
- College: Syracuse (1959–1961)
- NFL draft: 1962: 1st round, 1st overall pick
- AFL draft: 1962: 1st round, 4th overall pick

Career history
- Cleveland Browns (1962)*
- * Offseason or practice squad member only

Awards and highlights
- Cleveland Browns No. 45 retired; National champion (1959); Heisman Trophy (1961); Chic Harley Award (1961); Unanimous All-American (1961); Consensus All-American (1960); Second-team All-American (1959); 2× First-team All-Eastern (1960, 1961); Syracuse Orange No. 44 retired
- College Football Hall of Fame

Ernest R. Davis (December 14, 1939 – May 18, 1963) was an American college football player who was a halfback for the Syracuse Orangemen and won the Heisman Trophy in 1961. He was the award's first black recipient. Davis was selected first overall by the Washington Redskins in the 1962 NFL draft but was almost immediately traded to the Cleveland Browns. He was diagnosed with leukemia that same year, and died shortly after at age 23 without ever playing in a professional game. He was inducted into the College Football Hall of Fame in 1979 and was the subject of the 2008 film The Express: The Ernie Davis Story.

== Early life ==
Davis was born in New Salem, Pennsylvania. His father was killed in an accident shortly after his birth, and his mother, Avis Marie Davis Fleming, could not raise him alone. At 14 months, he was cared for by his maternal grandparents, Willie and Elizabeth Davis. At age 12, he went to live with his mother and stepfather in Elmira, New York, where he excelled in baseball, basketball, and football in grade school. He attended Elmira Free Academy, where he earned two All-American honors. At the end of his senior season he was recruited by numerous colleges, and chose to attend Syracuse University after being persuaded by Jim Brown, a Syracuse alumnus.

== College career ==
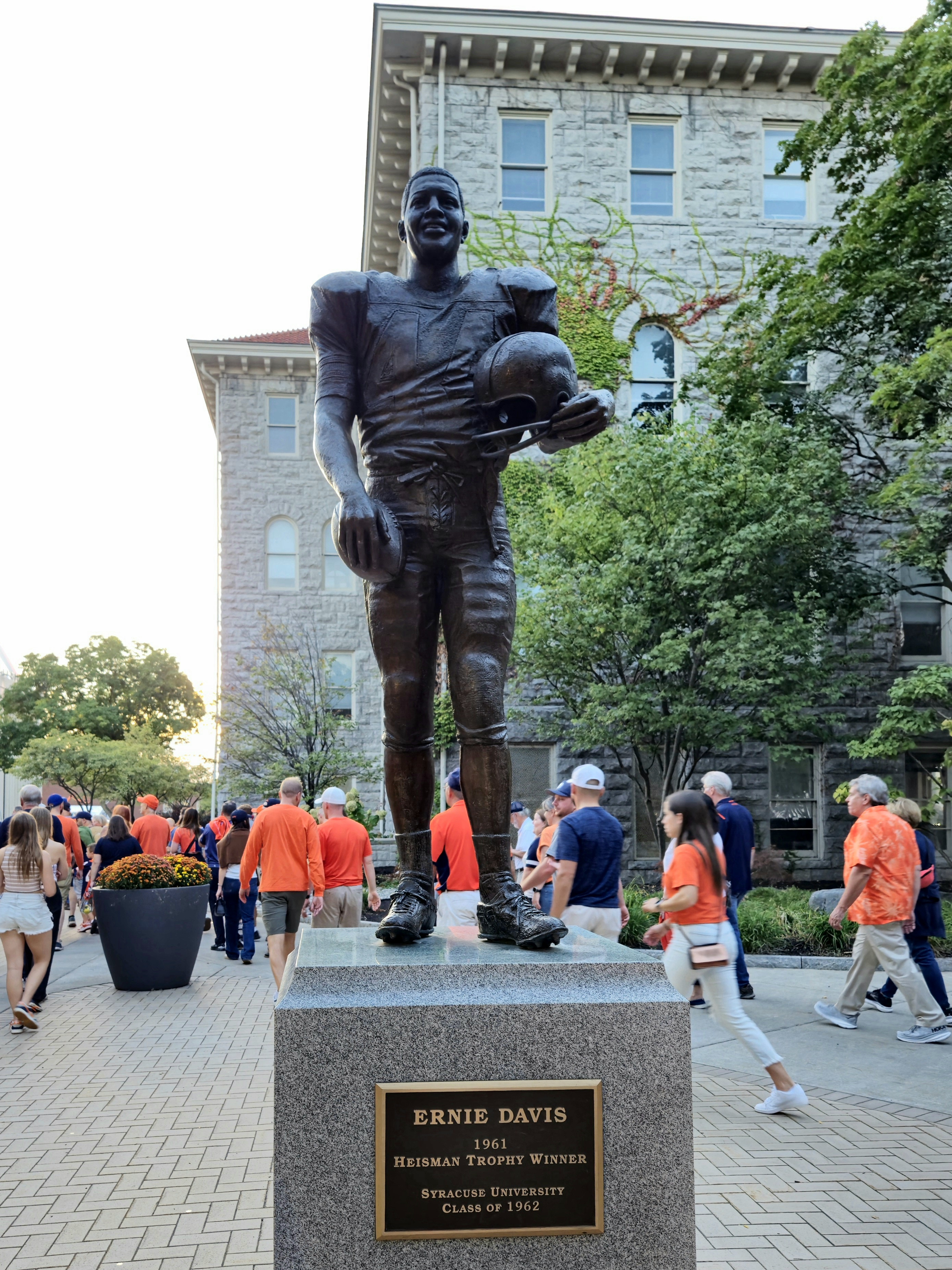
Ernie Davis Statue at Syracuse University campus.

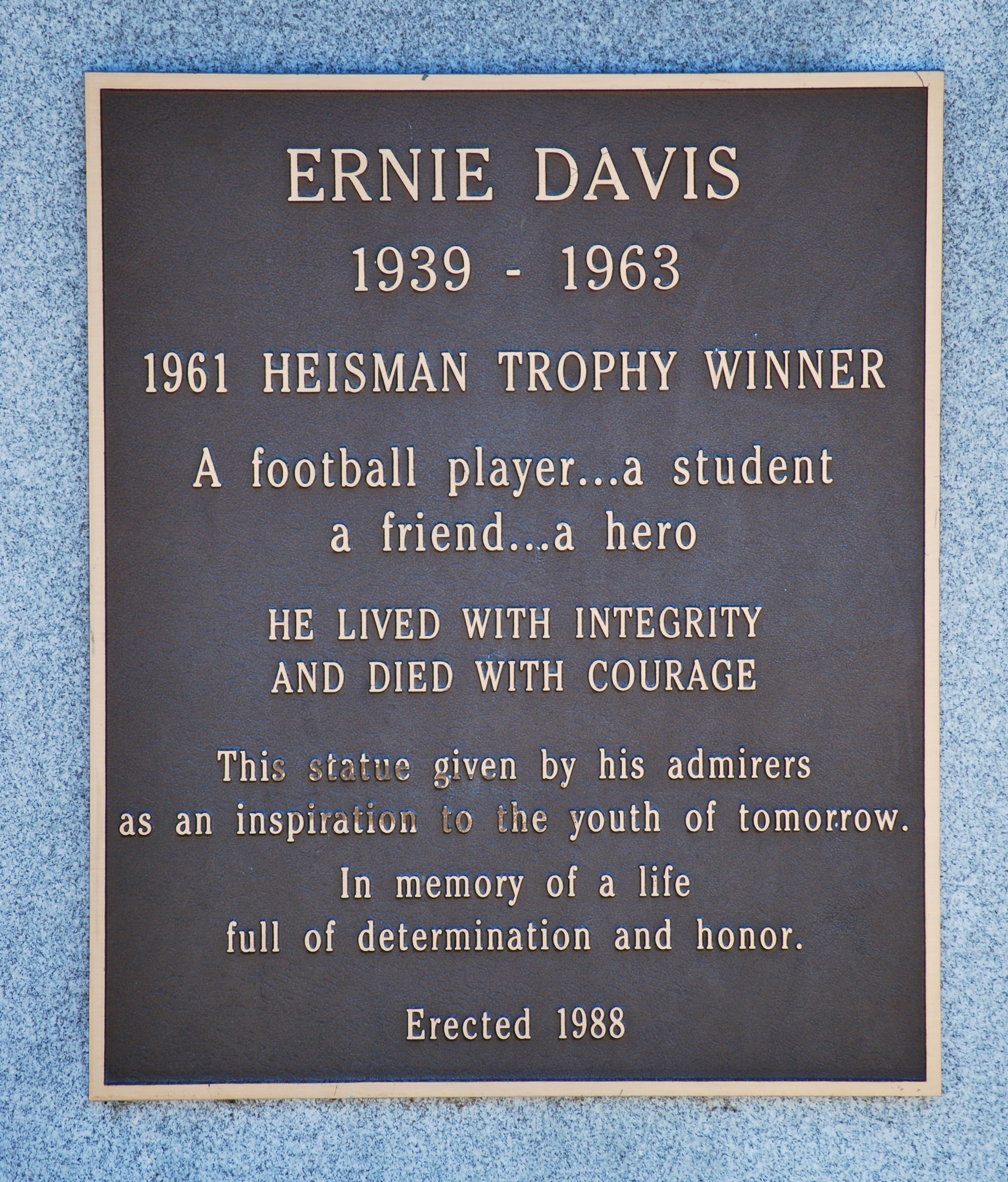
Plaque on statue, Ernie Davis Academy, Elmira, New York

Davis played football for coach Ben Schwartzwalder at Syracuse University from 1959 to 1961, and went on to national fame in each of those three seasons, twice winning first-team All-American honors. As a sophomore, Davis led the 1959 Syracuse team to a national championship, capping an 11–0 season with a 23–14 win over the Texas Longhorns in the 1960 Cotton Bowl Classic, where Davis was named Most Valuable Player. That same season, Elmira Star-Gazette sports writer Al Mallette coined the nickname for Davis, the "Elmira Express". In his junior year, 1960, he set a record of 7.8 yards per carry and was the third leading rusher in the country with 877 yards, having rushed for 100 yards in six of nine games. The 1960 Syracuse Orangemen finished with a record of 7–2 and did not play in a post-season bowl game. In Ernie's senior year, the 1961 Orangemen finished with a record of 8–3, closing the season with a 15–14 victory over the Miami Hurricanes in the Liberty Bowl, played at Philadelphia's Franklin Field. College football used limited substitution rules at the time and players played both offense and defense.

Discrimination was prevalent in the American South and during Davis' Cotton Bowl visit to host city Dallas, Texas. Author Jocelyn Selim writes that at the banquet following the 1960 game, Davis was told he could only accept his award and then would be required to leave the segregated facility. Davis and his black teammates were allowed to finish their meals at the banquet. When dessert was brought, a gentleman quietly approached them and told them they would have to leave when the doors were opened to the public for a dance. The three got up to leave and when the teammates found out, they wanted to leave too, but were told that it would only cause a bigger problem, so they stayed.

A different account of the banquet is given by John Brown. He was Davis' teammate at Syracuse and on the Cleveland Browns, his roommate and a close friend. According to an article in the Houston Chronicle, all the players from the game attended the banquet. Brown recalls that the teams sat on opposite sides of the room. After everyone ate and the trophies were handed out, the three black Syracuse players, Brown, Davis and Art Baker were asked to leave and were taken to another party in Dallas by local NAACP representatives. One Syracuse player, Gerhard Schwedes, recommended that the whole Syracuse team leave the banquet to show solidarity with their black teammates, but the suggestion was overruled by Syracuse officials. When the Chronicle asked Brown whether the film The Express is a truthful portrayal of his friend, Brown said " ... in short, no."

Davis became the first black athlete to be awarded the Heisman Trophy (the highest individual honor in collegiate football) and he also won the Walter Camp Memorial Trophy following his 1961 senior-year season at Syracuse University. President John F. Kennedy had followed Davis' career and requested to meet him while he was in New York to receive the trophy. Later in 1963, when Elmira chose February 3 to celebrate Davis' achievements, Kennedy sent a telegram, reading:

Seldom has an athlete been more deserving of such a tribute. Your high standards of performance on the field and off the field, reflect the finest qualities of competition, sportsmanship and citizenship. The nation has bestowed upon you its highest awards for your athletic achievements. It's a privilege for me to address you tonight as an outstanding American, and as a worthy example of our youth. I salute you.

During his time at Syracuse, Davis wore the same number, 44, as had legendary Orangeman Jim Brown, helping to establish a tradition at the school that was acknowledged on November 12, 2005, when the school retired the number in an on-field ceremony. After winning the Heisman Trophy, Ernie Davis talked Floyd Little into doing an about face and playing football for Syracuse instead of Notre Dame. Davis also played basketball at Syracuse for one season 1960–1961. Syracuse University, as a way to honor all of the athletes that have worn the number 44, was granted permission by the United States Postal Service to change its ZIP code to 13244.

While attending Syracuse, Davis was a member of the Sigma Alpha Mu fraternity, a nationally recognized Jewish fraternity. Davis was the first African-American to become part of the organization not only at the Syracuse chapter, but for the national fraternity as a whole. He was also a candidate in the university's Army ROTC program and was commissioned as a second lieutenant following graduation.

Davis was posthumously inducted into the College Football Hall of Fame in 1979.

Davis was a member of The Pigskin Club of Washington, D.C. National Intercollegiate All-American Football Players Honor.

In 1999, Sports Illustrated included him on its All-Century Team for college football.

== Professional football career ==
Davis was the first overall pick in the 1962 NFL draft on December 4, 1961. Selected by the Washington Redskins, he was then almost immediately traded to the Cleveland Browns.

He was also drafted in the first round two days earlier by the Buffalo Bills of the American Football League.

Redskins founder and owner George Preston Marshall was an avowed racist who kept the Redskins entirely white long after the other teams had integrated. He openly admitted that his unwillingness to sign a black player was an effort to appeal to his mostly Southern fan base (they had been the southernmost team in the league for a quarter century). The signing only came when Interior Secretary Stewart Udall issued an ultimatum to Marshall: sign a black player by the start of the 1962 season, or he would revoke the Redskins' 30-year lease on D.C. Stadium (now Robert F. Kennedy Memorial Stadium). The stadium was a city-owned facility, and the Washington city government has long been legally reckoned as a branch of the federal government (given that the Constitution gives Congress ultimate authority over the capital). Marshall could not bring himself to draft a black player, so he left the decision to general manager and head coach Bill McPeak, who picked Davis. Davis refused to play for the Redskins and demanded a trade. A deal with Cleveland was engineered by Browns coach Paul Brown without the knowledge of the owner Art Modell. This had been standard operating procedure with the Browns from their inception in 1946; Brown served as his own general manager, and had enjoyed a free hand in football matters. The Redskins traded the rights to Davis to the Cleveland Browns for Bobby Mitchell and first-round draft pick Leroy Jackson. Davis chose to go to the Cleveland Browns where his classmate John Brown would be his roommate and Jim Brown, whom he admired, was already playing.

Davis signed a three-year, $200,000 contract with the Browns in late December 1961 in San Francisco while preparing for the East-West Shrine Game. Originally reported at $80,000, the contract, according to Davis's attorney, Tony DeFilippo, consisted of $80,000 for playing football, including a $15,000 signing bonus; $60,000 for ancillary rights, such as image marketing; and $60,000 for off-season employment. It was the most lucrative contract for an NFL rookie up to that time.

The Browns' dream of pairing Davis with Jim Brown took a tragic turn when Davis was diagnosed with leukemia. The rift between Coach Brown and Modell worsened when Modell brought in doctors who said Davis was well enough to play and Brown still refused to allow it. Although Davis' leukemia was in remission at the time, Brown felt letting him play would hurt team morale. This contributed to Modell's decision to replace Brown before the 1963 season.

Davis was allowed to practice on the field without physical contact and helped Brown draw up game plans but he never played a meaningful down. His only appearance at Cleveland Stadium came at a pre-season game on August 18, in which he ran onto the field as a spotlight followed him. Following his death, the Browns retired his number 45 jersey.

== Death ==
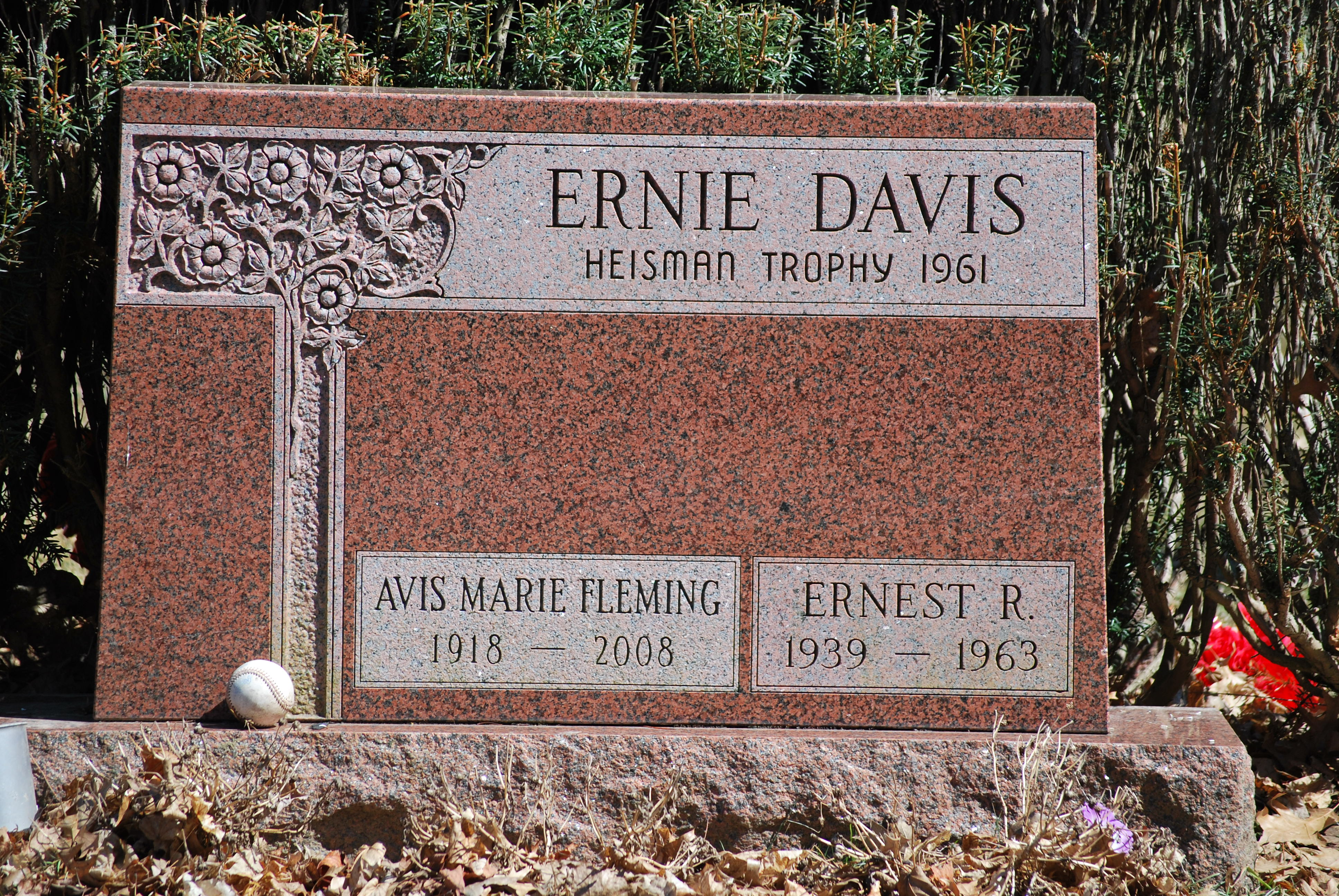
Davis' gravestone, Woodlawn Cemetery, Elmira, NY

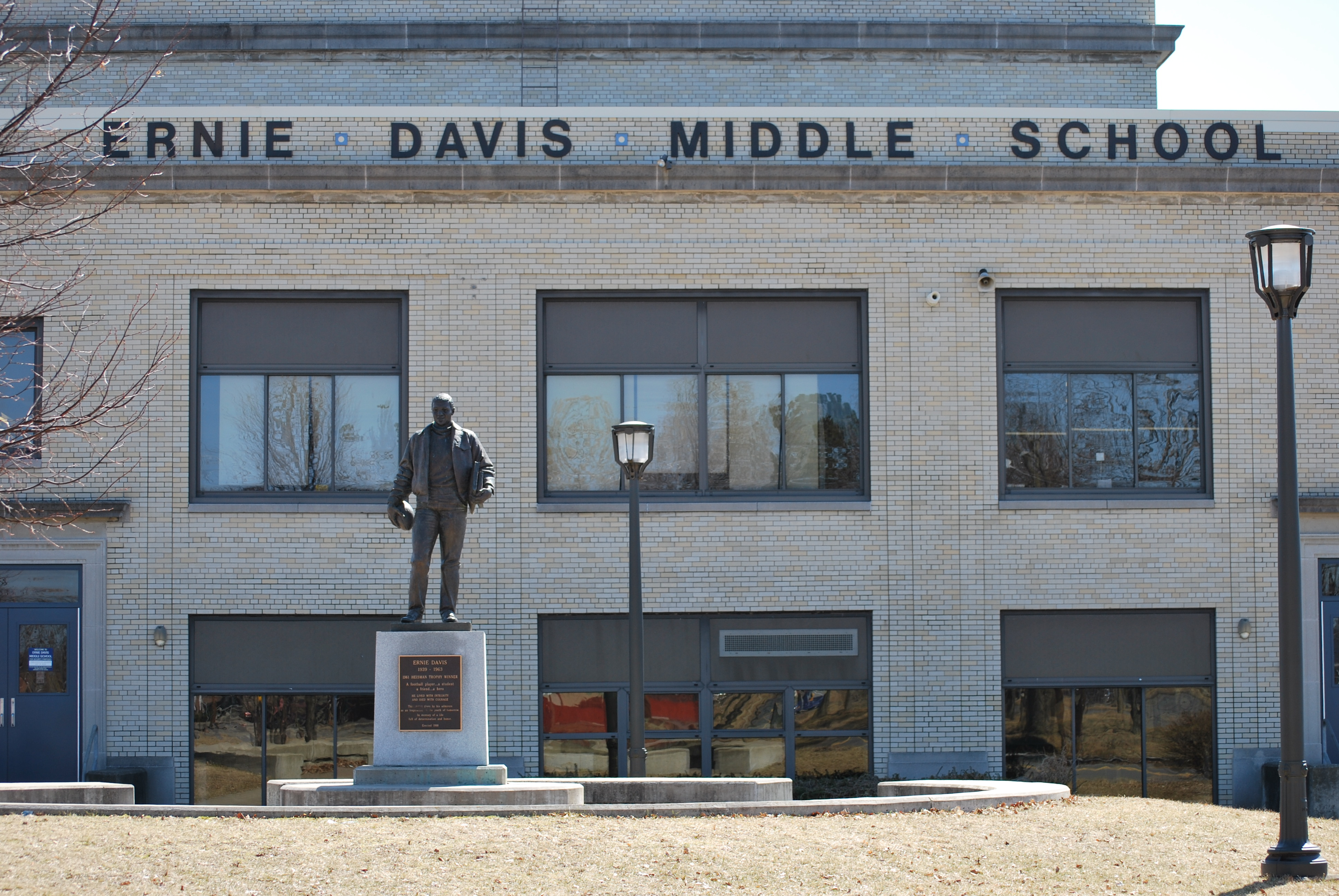
Statue at Ernie Davis Middle School (now at Ernie Davis Academy), Elmira, NY

While preparing to play in the College All-Star Game against the Green Bay Packers in Chicago in July during the summer of 1962, Davis awoke with a swollen neck and was hospitalized, with mumps or mononucleosis initially suspected. He was diagnosed with acute monocytic leukemia on August 1, and he had the deadly blood disease since April of 1962. He then began receiving medical treatment. Davis went to Johns Hopkins in Baltimore when he was dying —three months after being diagnosed— and, through chemical treatments, experienced a four- to five-month remission. The disease was then incurable, and Davis died at age 23 at Cleveland Lakeside Hospital at 2:00 A.M. on Saturday, May 18, 1963.

Both houses of the United States Congress eulogized Davis, and a wake was held at The Neighborhood House in Elmira, New York, where more than 10,000 mourners paid their respects. During the funeral, a message was received from President Kennedy, and it was read aloud to all of the people attending the service. Davis is buried at Woodlawn Cemetery in Elmira. His commemorative statue now stands in front of the school named in his honor, Ernie Davis Academy. Another statue of Davis stands on the campus of Syracuse University, near the steps of Hendricks Chapel and the Quad where pre-game pep rallies are held. He was elected to the College Football Hall of Fame in the fall of 1979. In the southern-tier region of New York, the best high-school football players, in their final year of eligibility, are invited to play in the Ernie Davis Classic. The game is traditionally played Thanksgiving Day, or the night before Thanksgiving.

== The Express ==
A motion picture biography, The Express: The Ernie Davis Story, directed by Gary Fleder and based on the non-fiction book The Elmira Express: the Story of Ernie Davis by Robert C. Gallagher, began production in April 2007 and was released on October 10, 2008. Rob Brown plays Davis, with Dennis Quaid portraying Davis' Syracuse University coach, Ben Schwartzwalder.

In 2011, rival schools Southside High School (Elmira, New York) and Elmira Free Academy combined their athletic teams, which together were renamed the Elmira Express, named after Ernie Davis.

== See also ==
- List of gridiron football players who died during their careers
