= Rob Brown (actor) =

American actor (born 1984)

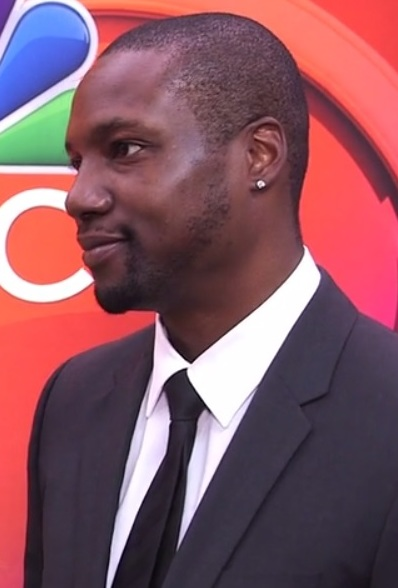
- Brown in 2015
- Born: Robert Brown; March 11, 1984 (age 42); Harlem, New York, U.S.
- Education: Amherst College (BA)
- Occupation: Actor
- Years active: 2000–present
- Children: 1

Robert Brown (born March 11, 1984) is an American actor. He is known for his roles in the films Finding Forrester (2000), Coach Carter (2005), Take the Lead (2006), and The Express: The Ernie Davis Story (2008), and for starring in the HBO series Treme (2010–13) and NBC series Blindspot (2015-2020).

== Early life ==
Brown was born in Harlem, New York, on March 11, 1984, the middle of three children. Brown's mother works as a substance abuse counselor. He was raised in Brooklyn. Brown attended Poly Prep Country Day School and Prep for Prep, where he played on the school's football team as a wide receiver. He graduated from Amherst College, where he balanced his education and acting career. Prior to being cast in Finding Forrester, Brown's only acting experience was a school play during childhood.

== Career ==
When he turned 16, Brown auditioned for Finding Forrester, expecting to be cast as an extra. However, the film's director Gus Van Sant claimed Brown was the actor he was seeking to portray high school basketball player Jamal Wallace, and cast him in the role. Brown made his acting debut in the 2000 film, opposite Sean Connery. Brown received positive reviews in his first acting role. One critic believed Brown shone more than his veteran co-star. A film reviewer stated Brown held his own "remarkably well" alongside Connery, with a third opining the two actors had an "appealing chemistry."

In 2005, he played the role of basketball player Kenyon Stone in the drama film Coach Carter, starring Samuel L. Jackson. Reviewer A. O. Scott opined Brown had a "strong" showing in the movie. The following year, he appeared as a high school student Jason "Rock" Rockwell in the dance film Take the Lead, starring Antonio Banderas and Alfre Woodard. Brown portrayed football player Ernie Davis in The Express: The Ernie Davis Story (2008).

Brown landed his first television role as jazz musician Delmond Lambreaux on drama series Treme in 2010. He continued portraying the character until the show ended in 2013. Brown was cast in the NBC drama Blindspot (2015−20) as FBI Special Agent Edgar Reade. He appeared as Bobby in Don Jon (2013) and played the role of Bryce in Criminal Activities (2015). In 2022, Brown recurred as Maurice Ward in miniseries We Own This City.

== Personal life ==
=== Racial profiling lawsuit ===
In 2013, CNN reported that actor Rob Brown had reached a “settlement in principle” in his racial profiling lawsuits against Macy’s and the City of New York, according to court documents and a statement from the retailer.

The lawsuits stemmed from an incident earlier that year in which Brown was arrested after allegedly purchasing a watch for his mother with a “fake” credit card at Macy’s in New York City. He was later released without charges when it was confirmed that the American Express card was his. Macy’s staff had reportedly become suspicious—possibly because of the cost of the watch, his age, or his ethnicity—but failed to verify the card’s validity or match it with his driver’s license."

== Filmography ==
=== Film ===
Year	Title	Role	Notes
2000	Finding Forrester	Jamal Wallace	
2005	The Orphan King	Tye	
2005	Coach Carter	Kenyon Stone	
2006	Take the Lead	Jason "Rock" Rockwell	
2007	Live!	Byron	
2008	Stop-Loss	Isaac "Eyeball" Butler	
2008	The Express: The Ernie Davis Story	Ernie Davis	
2012	The Dark Knight Rises	Detective Crispus Allen	
2013	Don Jon	Bobby	
2015	Criminal Activities	Bryce	

=== Television ===
Year	Title	Role	Notes
2010–2013	Treme	Delmond Lambreaux	Main role
2015–2020	Blindspot	Special Agent Edgar Reade	Main role (seasons 1–4); Recurring role (season 5)
2016–2017	Shooter	Donny Fenn	Recurring role
2022	We Own This City	Maurice Ward	Recurring role

=== Video games ===
Year	Title	Role	Notes
2020	NBA 2K21	Coach Emmanuel (voice)	
