= Harry Crump (American football) =

American football player (1940–2020)

Harry M. Crump (June 18, 1940 – September 4, 2020) in Framingham, Massachusetts, often regarded as "Harry the Thump", was an American professional football player who was a fullback for the Boston Patriots of the American Football League (AFL). He played college football for the Boston College Eagles.
