= West Philadelphia High School =

High school in Pennsylvania, United States

Location
- 4901 Chestnut St. Philadelphia, Pennsylvania 19139; United States; 39.9581°N 75.2196°W

Information
- Type: Public high school
- Motto: Where Every Student Thrives!
- Established: 1912
- School district: School District of Philadelphia
- Principal: Marla Travis
- Staff: 49.30 (FTE)
- Grades: 9–12
- Enrollment: 593 (2023–2024)
- Student to teacher ratio: 12.03
- Colors: Orange and Blue
- Nickname: Speedboys and Speedgirls
- Yearbook: The Flame
- Website: West Philadelphia High School
- West Philadelphia High School
- U.S. National Register of Historic Places
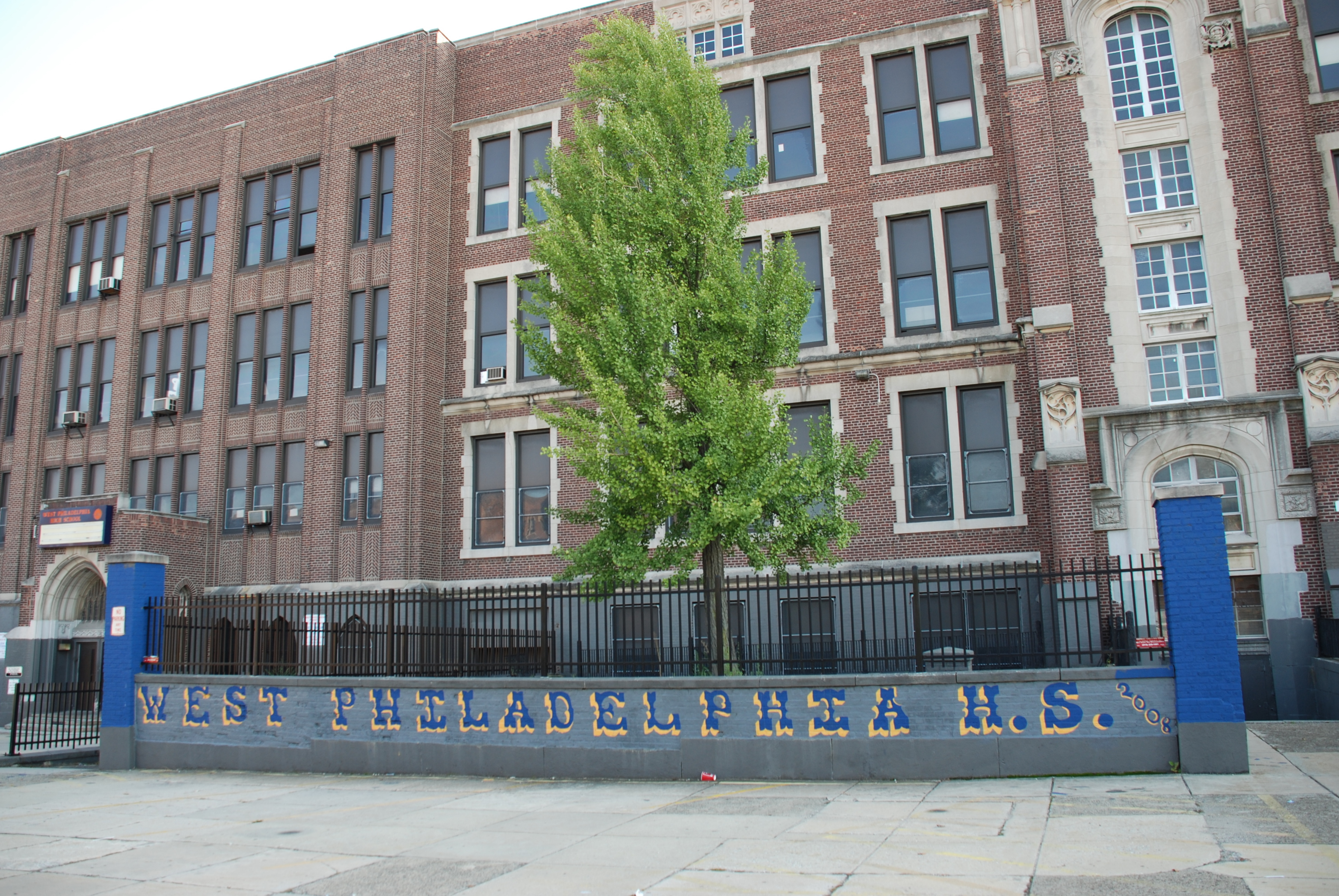
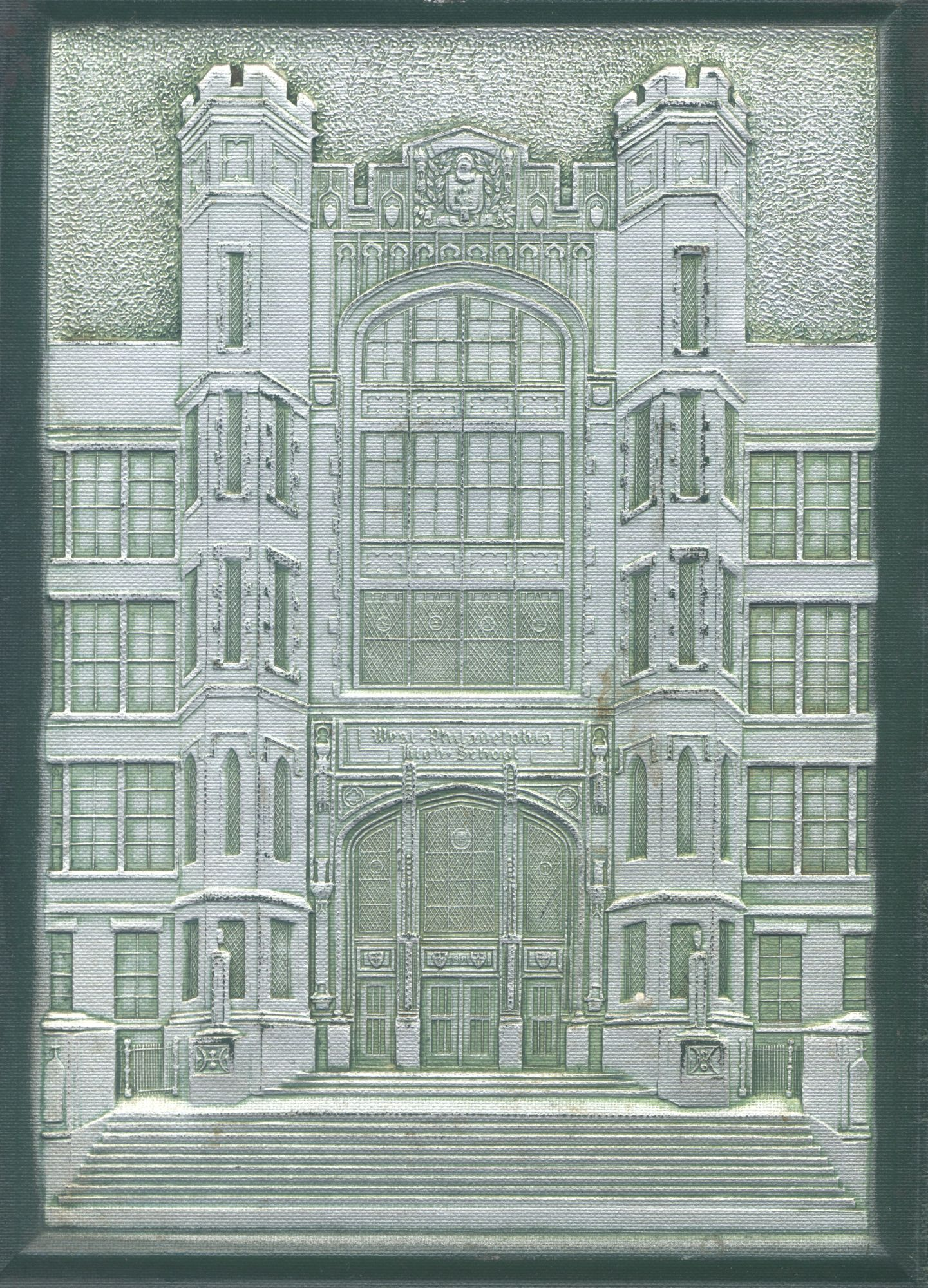
- The original West Philadelphia High School Front of the original West Philadelphia High School building, as depicted in yearbook covers 1939-1949

- Location within Philadelphia Location within Pennsylvania Location within the United States
- Location: 4700 Walnut St., Philadelphia, Pennsylvania
- Coordinates: 39.9555°N 75.2167°W
- Area: West Philadelphia
- Built: 1912
- Architect: Henry deCoursey Richards, Grays & Co.
- MPS: Philadelphia Public Schools TR
- NRHP reference No.: 86003345
- Added to NRHP: December 4, 1986

West Philadelphia High School is a secondary school located in the West Philadelphia section of Philadelphia, Pennsylvania, at the intersection of 49th Street and Chestnut Street.

== History ==
=== 20th century ===
The original West Philadelphia High School (WPHS) building opened in 1912 as Philadelphia's first secondary school west of the Schuylkill, occupying an entire city block bounded by 47th, 48th, Walnut, and Locust Streets. The student population at that time was in excess of 5,500. Such was the press on the new high school, which originally stood as two separate buildings for boys and girls, that the City was compelled to open Overbrook High School in 1926. A third high school, John Bartram, followed in 1935.

The building was added to the National Register of Historic Places in 1986.

The school's motto was "Alere Flammam," to feed the flame. It derived from the Latin verb "alere," to nourish or to feed, and the Latin noun "flammam," flame.

WPHS's athletic field, which is located at 48th and Spruce Street, was formerly known as Passon Field and home to Negro league baseball in the 1930s. It was the home field of the Eastern Colored League's Philadelphia Bacharach Giants starting in 1931, and the Negro National League's Philadelphia Stars in 1934 and 1935. In 1936, the Stars moved to Penmar Park at 44th and Parkside, where they played the majority of their home games through their final season in 1952. The field is still in use by West Philadelphia High School's football and baseball teams.

=== 21st century ===
In September 2011, the school moved to a new building at its current building at 49th and Chestnut Streets. The new building is much smaller due to reduced enrollment at the high school. The former building at 47th Street & Walnut Street was converted into housing as the West Lofts, for about 268 apartments.

In June 2013, the school district allowed the Sustainability Workshop to take all of the space in the auto mechanic building, prompting community opposition.

In November 2016, the water from some faucets at the high school was found to be discolored, and was declared unsafe by school officials the following month.

== Small learning communities ==
- AUTO: Automotive Academy
- B&T: Business and Technology
- UL: Urban Leadership
- 9: Ninth Grade Success Academy
- CAPA: Creative & Performing Arts

== Sports programs and extracurricular activities ==
- Cheerleading Squad
- Dance Club
- Musicals
- Choir
- Volleyball
- Baseball
- Boys Basketball - 1977 national champions
- Girls Basketball
- Football
- Track

== Notable alumni ==
- Gene Banks, former professional basketball player, Chicago Bulls and San Antonio Spurs
- Tyrell Biggs, heavyweight boxing champion, 1984 Summer Olympics
- Emma C. Chappell (1941-2021), founder and CEO of United Bank of Philadelphia
- Benedict Coren, football player
- Linda Harriott-Gathright, politician
- John McDermott, first American U.S. Open golf tournament winner, 1911
- Anne Rudin, former Mayor of Sacramento, 1983 to 1992
- Ray Scott, former professional basketball player and coach, Detroit Pistons
- Art Spector, former professional basketball player, Boston Celtics
- Teair Tart, professional football player, Tennessee Titans, Los Angeles Chargers, and Houston Texans
- McCoy Tyner, Grammy award-winning jazz pianist
- LeAnna Washington, former Pennsylvania state senator
