= 1961 Indiana Collegiate Conference football season =

- Sport: Football
- Teams: 7
- Champion: Butler

Football seasons

1961 Indiana Collegiate Conference football standings
	Conf.					Overall
Team	W		L		T	W		L		T
Butler $	6	–	0	–	0	9	–	0	–	0
Valparaiso	5	–	1	–	0	7	–	2	–	0
Evansville	3	–	3	–	0	4	–	5	–	0
DePauw	2	–	4	–	0	5	–	4	–	0
Ball State	2	–	4	–	0	2	–	5	–	1
Indiana State	2	–	4	–	0	2	–	6	–	0
Saint Joseph's (IN)	1	–	5	–	0	1	–	7	–	0
$ – Conference champion

The 1961 Indiana Collegiate Conference football season was the season of college football played by the seven member schools of the Indiana Collegiate Conference (ICC) as part of the 1961 college football season.

The 1961 Butler Bulldogs football team, in their 21st year under head coach Tony Hinkle, defeated all six conference opponents to win the conference championship and compiled a perfect 9–0 overall record.

The 1961 Valparaiso Crusaders football team, in their 16th year under head coach Emory Bauer, compiled a 7–2 record (5–1 in conference games) and finished in second place in the ICC.

== Teams ==
=== Butler ===
1961 Butler Bulldogs football

ICC champion
- Conference: Indiana Collegiate Conference
- Record: 9–0 (6–0 ICC)
- Head coach: Tony Hinkle (21st season)
- Home stadium: Butler Bowl

The 1961 Butler Bulldogs football team represented Butler University of Indianapolis as a member of the Indiana Collegiate Conference (ICC) during the 1961 college football season. In their 21st year under head coach Tony Hinkle, the Bulldogs compiled a perfect 9–0 record (6–0 against ICC opponents), won the ICC championship, and outscored opponents by a total of 251 to 65.

==== Schedule ====
Date	Opponent	Site	Result	Attendance	Source
September 23	Bradley*	Butler Bowl; Indianapolis, IN	W 34–23	6,950	
September 30	Ball State	Butler Bowl; Indianapolis, IN	W 48–6	7,450	
October 7	at Wabash*	Ingalls Field; Crawfordsville, IN (Iron Key)	W 34–7	2,150	
October 14	at DePauw	Greencastle, IN (Old Gold Day)	W 12–6	5,000	
October 21	Saint Joseph's (IN)^{†}	Butler Bowl; Indianapolis, IN	W 27–7	9,000	
October 28	at Indiana State	Memorial Stadium; Terre Haute, IN	W 26–0	1,000–1,100	
November 4	Valparaiso	Butler Bowl; Indianapolis, IN (rivalry)	W 14–2	11,200	
November 11	at Evansville	Evansville, IN	W 30–7	1,000	
November 18	Washington University*	Butler Bowl; Indianapolis, IN	W 26–7		
*Non-conference game; ^{†}Homecoming

=== Valparaiso ===
1961 Valparaiso Crusaders football
- Conference: Indiana Collegiate Conference
- Record: 7–2 (5–1 ICC)
- Head coach: Emory Bauer (16th season)
- Home stadium: Brown Field

The 1961 Valparaiso Crusaders football team represented Valparaiso University of Valparaiso, Indiana, as a member of the Indiana Collegiate Conference (ICC) during the 1961 college football season. In their 16th year under head coach Emory Bauer, the Crusaders compiled a 7–2 record (5–1 in conference games) and finished in second place in the ICC.

==== Schedule ====
Date	Opponent	Site	Result	Attendance	Source
September 16	at Wheaton (IL)*	McCully Field; Wheaton, IL	L 13–35		
September 23	Hope*	Valparaiso, IN	W 14–6		
September 30	at Saint Joseph's (IN)	Rensselaer, IN	W 16–6		
October 7	Indiana State	Brown Field; Valparaiso, IN	W 20–6	4,500	
October 14	Washington University*^{†}	Brown Field; Valparaiso, IN	W 29–0	4,594	
October 21	at Evansville	Evansville, IN	W 29–18		
October 28	Ball State	Brown Field; Valparaiso, IN	W 28–20		
November 4	at Butler	Butler Bowl; Indianapolis, IN (rivalry)	L 2–14	11,200	
November 11	DePauw	Brown Field; Valparaiso, IN	W 35–14	3,447	
*Non-conference game; ^{†}Homecoming

=== Evansville ===
1961 Evansville Purple Aces football
- Conference: Indiana Collegiate Conference
- Record: 4–5 (3–3 ICC)
- Head coach: Paul Beck (8th season)
- Home stadium: Reitz Bowl

The 1961 Evansville Purple Aces football team represented Evansville College (now known as the University of Evansville) as a member of the Indiana Collegiate Conference (ICC) during the 1961 college football season. In their eighth year under head coach Paul Beck, the Purple Aces compiled a 4–5 record (3–3 in conference games) and finished in third place in the ICC.

==== Schedule ====
Date	Opponent	Site	Result	Attendance	Source
September 16	at Hanover*	Hanover, IN	W 26–0	2,000	
September 23	at Wabash*	Ingalls Field; Crawfordsville, IN	L 7–12		
September 30	at DePauw	Greencastle, IN	W 9–7		
October 7	Saint Joseph's (IN)	Bosse Field; Evansville, IN	W 15–13	2,500	
October 14	at Indiana State	Terre Haute, IN; Terre Haute, IN	W 15–14		
October 21	Valparaiso	Evansville, IN	L 18–29		
October 28	Western Illinois*	Evansville, IN	L 0–26	3,800–5,000	
November 4	at Ball State	Ball State Field; Muncie, IN	L 3–6		
November 11	Butler	Evansville, IN	L 7–30	1,000	
*Non-conference game

=== DePauw ===
1961 DePauw Tigers football
- Conference: Indiana Collegiate Conference
- Record: 5–4 (2–4 ICC)
- Head coach: Tommy Mont (3rd season)

The 1961 DePauw Tigers football team represented DePauw University of Greencastle, Indiana, as a member of the Indiana Collegiate Conference (ICC) during the 1961 college football season. In their third year under head coach Tommy Mont, the Tigers compiled a 5–4 record (2–4 in conference games) and tied for fourth place in the ICC.

==== Schedule ====
Date	Opponent	Site	Result	Attendance	Source
September 23	at Illinois Wesleyan*	Bloomington, IL	W 8–0		
September 30	Evansville	Greencastle, IN	L 7–9		
October 7	at Ball State	Ball State Field; Muncie, IN	W 48–6	7,450	
October 14	Butler	Greencastle, IN (Old Gold Day)	L 6–12	5,000	
October 21	at Washington University*	Francis Field; St. Louis, MO	W 27–6		
October 28	at Saint Joseph's	Rensselaer, IN	L 7–8		
November 4	Indiana State	Greencastle, IN	W 28–14		
November 11	at Valparaiso	Valparaiso, IN	L 14–35		
November 18	Wabash*	Greencastle, IN (Monon Bell)	W 20–7		
*Non-conference game

=== Ball State ===
1961 Ball State Cardinals football
- Conference: Indiana Collegiate Conference
- Record: 2–5–1 (2–4 ICC)
- Head coach: Jim Freeman (6th season)
- Home stadium: Ball State Field

The 1961 Ball State Cardinals football team was an American football team that represented Ball State College (later renamed Ball State University) in the Indiana Collegiate Conference (ICC) during the 1961 college football season. In its sixth season under head coach Jim Freeman, the team compiled a 2–5–1 record and finished in a three-way tie for fourth place out of seven teams in the ICC.

==== Schedule ====
Date	Opponent	Site	Result	Attendance	Source
September 23	Eastern Michigan*	Ball State Field; Muncie, IN	T 0–0	> 7,500	
September 30	at Butler	Butler Bowl; Indianapolis, IN	L 6–48	7,450	
October 7	DePauw	Ball State Field; Muncie, IN	L 8–10		
October 14	at Saint Joseph's (IN)	Collegeville, IN	W 8–0		
October 21	Indiana State*	Ball State Field; Muncie, IN (Blue Key Victory Bell)	L 0–41	> 9,000	
October 28	at Valparaiso	Valparaiso, IN	L 20–28		
November 4	Evansville	Ball State Field; Muncie, IN	W 6–3		
November 11	at Ohio Northern*	Ada, OH	L 20–49		
*Non-conference game

=== Indiana State ===
1961 Indiana State Sycamores football
- Conference: Indiana Collegiate Conference
- Record: 2–6 (2–4 ICC)
- Head coach: Bill Jones (5th season)

The 1961 Indiana State Sycamores football team represented Indiana State College (now known as Indiana State University) of Terre Haute, Indiana, as a member of the Indiana Collegiate Conference (ICC) during the 1961 college football season. In their fifth year under head coach Bill Jones, the Sycamores compiled a 2–6 record (2–4 in conference games) and finished in a three-way tie for fourth place in the ICC.

==== Schedule ====
Date	Opponent	Site	Result	Attendance	Source
September 23	Eastern Illinois*	Memorial Stadium; Terre Haute, IN	L 20–23		
September 30	Indiana Central*	Indianapolis, IN	L 20–26		
October 7	at Valparaiso	Brown Field; Valparaiso, IN	L 7–20	4,500	
October 14	Evansville	Memorial Stadium; Terre Haute, IN	L 14–15		
October 21	at Ball State	Ball State Field; Muncie, IN (Blue Key Victory Bell)	W 41–0	> 9,000	
October 28	Butler	Memorial Stadium; Terre Haute, IN	L 0–26	1,000–1,100	
November 4	at DePauw	Greencastle, IN	L 14–28		
November 11	Saint Joseph's (IN)	Memorial Stadium; Terre Haute, IN	W 13–9		
*Non-conference game

=== Saint Joseph's ===
1961 Saint Joseph's Pumas football
- Conference: Indiana Collegiate Conference
- Record: 1–7 (1–5 ICC)
- Head coach: Ed Dwyer (1st season)

The 1961 Saint Joseph's Pumas football team represented Saint Joseph’s College of Collegeville, Indiana, as a member of the Indiana Collegiate Conference (ICC) during the 1961 college football season. In their first year under head coach Ed Dwyer, the Pumas compiled a 1–7 record (1–5 in conference games) and finished in last place in the ICC.

==== Schedule ====
Date	Opponent	Site	Result	Attendance	Source
September 16	Hillsdale*	Rensselaer, IN	L 7–28		
September 30	Valparaiso	Rensselaer, IN	L 6–16		
October 7	at Evansville	Evansville, IN	L 13–15		
October 14	Ball State	Rensselaer, IN	L 0–8		
October 21	at Butler	Butler Bowl; Indianapolis, IN	L 7–27	9,000	
October 28	DePauw	Rensselaer, IN	W 8–7		
November 4	at Central State (OH)*	Wilberforce, OH	L 16–34		
November 11	at Indiana State	Memorial Stadium; Terre Haute, IN	L 9–13		
*Non-conference game
