= List of Valparaiso Beacons head football coaches =

The Valparaiso Beacons football program is a college football team that represents Valparaiso University in the Pioneer Football League, a part of the NCAA Division I Football Championship Subdivision. The team has had 20 head coaches since its first recorded football game in 1906, although records do not record a coach until 1919. Since December 2024 Andy Waddle has served as head coach at Valparaiso.

== Key ==
Key to symbols in coaches list
General		Overall		Conference		Postseason (Note: Although the first Rose Bowl Game was played in 1902, it has been continuously played since the 1916 game, and is recognized as the oldest bowl game by the NCAA. "—" indicates any season prior to 1916 when postseason games were not played.)	
No.	Order of coaches (Note: A running total of the number of head coaches, with coaches who served separate tenures being counted only once. Interim head coaches are represented with "Int" and are not counted in the running total. "—" indicates the team played but either without a coach or no coach is on record. "X" indicates an interim year without play.)	GC	Games coached	CW	Conference wins	PW	Postseason wins
DC	Division championships	OW	Overall wins	CL	Conference losses	PL	Postseason losses
CC	Conference championships	OL	Overall losses	CT	Conference ties	PT	Postseason ties
NC	National championships	OT	Overall ties (Note: Overtime rules in college football were introduced in 1996, making ties impossible in the period since.)	C%	Conference winning percentage		
†	Elected to the College Football Hall of Fame	O%	Overall winning percentage (Note: When computing the win–loss percentage, a tie counts as half a win and half a loss.)				

== Coaches ==
Statistics correct as of the end of the 2025 college football season.

No.	Name	Term	GC	OW	OL	OT	O%	CW	CL	CT	C%	PW	PL	CCs	NCs	Awards
0	Unknown	1906–1907	2	0	2	0	.000	—	—	—		—	—	—	—	
1	George Keogan	1919–1920	16	10	6	0	.625	0	0	0		0	0	0	0	
2	Earl Goheen	1921–1922	12	5	4	3	.542	—	—	—		—	—	—	—	
3	William Shadoan	1923–1924	17	9	5	3	.618	—	—	—		—	—	—	—	
4	Millard Anderson	1925	7	1	6	0	.143	—	—	—		—	—	—	—	
5	Conrad Moll	1926	6	1	4	1	.250	—	—	—		—	—	—	—	
6	Earl Scott	1927–1928	13	2	11	0	.154	—	—	—		—	—	—	—	
7	Jake Christiansen	1929–1940	97	50	43	4	.536	—	—	—		—	—	—	—	
8	Victor Dauer	1941	8	0	8	0	.000	—	—	—		—	—	—	—	
9	Loren Ellis	1942	8	4	4	0	.500	—	—	—		—	—	—	—	
X	No Team	1943–1944	0	0	0	0	—	—	—	—		—	—	—	—	
9	Loren Ellis	1945	7	6	1	0	.857	0	0	0		0	0	1	0	
10	Emory Bauer	1946–1956	99	59	35	5	.621	23	8	1	.734	—	1	3	—	
11	Emory Bauer & Walt Reiner	1957–1964	71	40	29	2	.577	25	20	1	.554	—	—	1	—	
10	Emory Bauer	1965–1967	27	9	18	0	.333	4	13	0	.235	—	—	3	—	
12	Norm Amundsen	1968–1976	87	44	40	3	.523	21	24	0	.467	—	—	2	—	
13	Bill Koch	1977–1988	117	43	71	3	.380	20	46	2	.309	—	—	—	—	
14	Tom Horne	1989–2004	169	67	101	1	.399	25	61	1	.293	—	—	2	—	
15	Stacy Adams	2005–2009	55	15	40	0	.273	6	28	0	.176	—	—	—	—	
16	Dale Carlson	2010–2013	43	3	40	0	.070	3	29	0	.094	—	—	—	—	
Int	Mike Gravier (interim)	2013	1	0	1	0	.000	0	1	0	.000		—	—	—	
17	Dave Cecchini	2014–2018	55	17	38	0	.309	13	27	0	.325	—	—	—	—	
18	Landon Fox	2019–2024	63	21	42	0	.333	16	26	0	.381	—	—	—	—	
19	Andy Waddle	2025–present	12	2	10	0	.167	1	7	0	.125	—	—	—	—	
