= List of Valparaiso Beacons men's basketball seasons =

This is a list of seasons completed by the Valparaiso Beacons men's college basketball team.

== Seasons ==
Statistics overview
Season	Coach	Overall	Conference	Standing	Postseason
Sidney Winters (Independent) (1917–1919)
1917–18	Sidney Winters	7–2			
1918–19	Sidney Winters	1–2			
Sidney Winters:		8–4 (.667)			
George Keogan (Independent) (1919–1921)
1919–20	George Keogan	12–8			
1920–21	George Keogan	19–5			
George Keogan:		31–13 (.705)			
Earl Goheen (Independent) (1921–1923)
1921–22	Earl Goheen	15–7			
1922–23	Earl Goheen	15–5			
Earl Goheen:		30–12 (.714)			
William Shadoan (Independent) (1923–1925)
1923–24	William Shadoan	24–4			
1924–25	William Shadoan	9–5			
William Shadoan:		33–9 (.786)			
Millard Anderson (Independent) (1925–1926)
1925–26	Millard Anderson	6–13			
Millard Anderson:		6–13 (.316)			
Conrad Moll (Independent) (1926–1927)
1926–27	Conrad Moll	10–10			
Conrad Moll:		10–10 (.500)			
Earl Scott (Independent) (1927–1929)
1927–28	Earl Scott	11–4			
1928–29	Earl Scott	11–20			
Earl Scott:		22–14 (.611)			
Jake Christiansen (Independent) (1929–1941)
1929–30	Jake Christiansen	4–11			
1930–31	Jake Christiansen	16–2			
1931–32	Jake Christiansen	12–12			
1932–33	Jake Christiansen	14–2			
1933–34	Jake Christiansen	9–9			
1934–35	Jake Christiansen	2–13			
1935–36	Jake Christiansen	8–8			
1936–37	Jake Christiansen	9–9			
1937–38	Jake Christiansen	13–6			NAIA second round
1938–39	Jake Christiansen	5–10			
1939–40	Jake Christiansen	6–14			
1940–41	Jake Christiansen	4–12			
Jake Christiansen:		102–108 (.486)			
Loren Ellis (Independent) (1941–1947)
1941–42	Loren Ellis	4–13			
1942–43	Loren Ellis	17–5			NAIA first round
1943–44	Loren Ellis	17–8			
1944–45	Loren Ellis	21–3			
1945–46	Loren Ellis	17–11			
1946–47	Loren Ellis	11–20			
Loren Ellis:		87–60 (.592)			
Emory Bauer (Independent) (1947–1948)
1947–48	Emory Bauer	8–15			
Emory Bauer:		8–15 (.348)			
Don Warnke (Independent) (1948–1949)
1948–49	Don Warnke	8–17			
Don Warnke:		8–17 (.320)			
Sonny Allen (Independent) (1949–1950)
1949–50	Sonny Allen	15–8			
Sonny Allen (Indiana Collegiate Conference) (1950–1951)
1950–51	Sonny Allen	12–10	5–3	3rd	
Sonny Allen:		27–18 (.600)	5–3 (.625)		
Kenneth Suesens (Indiana Collegiate Conference) (1951–1958)
1951–52	Kenneth Suesens	12–12	6–4	2nd	
1952–53	Kenneth Suesens	9–15	2–8	6th	
1953–54	Kenneth Suesens	10–13	7–5	3rd	
1954–55	Kenneth Suesens	13–11	8–4	2nd	
1955–56	Kenneth Suesens	12–14	8–4	2nd	
1956–57	Kenneth Suesens	11–14	6–6	4th	
1957–58	Kenneth Suesens	7–14	4–9	6th	
Kenneth Suesens:		74–93 (.443)	41–88 (.318)		
Paul Meadows (Indiana Collegiate Conference) (1958–1964)
1958–59	Paul Meadows	12–11	5–7	5th	
1959–60	Paul Meadows	12–13	8–4	3rd	
1960–61	Paul Meadows	7–16	3–9	6th	
1961–62	Paul Meadows	17–8	7–5	3rd	NCAA College Division Elite Eight
1962–63	Paul Meadows	7–16	1–11	7th	
1963–64	Paul Meadows	9–15	2–10	7th	
Paul Meadows:		64–79 (.448)	26–46 (.361)		
Gene Bartow (Indiana Collegiate Conference) (1964–1970)
1964–65	Gene Bartow	12–12	5–7	3rd	
1965–66	Gene Bartow	18–10	7–5	4th	NCAA College Division Sweet Sixteen
1966–67	Gene Bartow	21–8	7–5	2nd	NCAA College Division Elite Eight
1967–68	Gene Bartow	11–15	3–9	6th	
1968–69	Gene Bartow	16–12	4–4	T–2nd	NCAA College Division Sweet Sixteen
1969–70	Gene Bartow	13–13	2–6	5th	
Gene Bartow:		91–70 (.565)	28–36 (.438)		
Bill Purden (Indiana Collegiate Conference) (1970–1976)
1970–71	Bill Purden	13–13	4–4	T–2nd	
1971–72	Bill Purden	15–11	4–4	3rd	
1972–73	Bill Purden	17–11	8–4	T–1st	NCAA College Division Sweet Sixteen
1973–74	Bill Purden	15–11	8–4	T–3rd	
1974–75	Bill Purden	14–11	8–4	T–2nd	
1975–76	Bill Purden	12–14	7–5	3rd	
Bill Purden:		86–71 (.548)	39–25 (.609)		
Ken Rochlitz (Indiana Collegiate Conference) (1976–1978)
1976–77	Ken Rochlitz	13–12	5–5	3rd	
1977–78	Ken Rochlitz	6–19	1–4	3rd	
Ken Rochlitz (Independent) (1978–1980)
1978–79	Ken Rochlitz	4–21			
1979–80	Ken Rochlitz	8–18			
Ken Rochlitz:		31–70 (.307)	6–9 (.400)		
Tom Smith (Independent) (1980–1982)
1980–81	Tom Smith	12–15			
1981–82	Tom Smith	9–18			
Tom Smith (Mid–Continent Conference) (1982–1988)
1982–83	Tom Smith	13–15	4–9	6th	
1984–85	Tom Smith	8–20	4–10	7th	
1985–86	Tom Smith	9–19	5–9	6th	
1986–87	Tom Smith	12–16	4–10	6th	
1987–88	Tom Smith	12–16	3–11	8th	
Tom Smith:		84–138 (.378)	20–49 (.290)		
Homer Drew (Mid–Continent Conference) (1988–2002)
1988–89	Homer Drew	10–19	4–8	T–5th	
1989–90	Homer Drew	4–24	1–11	7th	
1990–91	Homer Drew	5–22	2–14	9th	
1991–92	Homer Drew	5–22	2–14	9th	
1992–93	Homer Drew	12–16	7–9	T–6th	
1993–94	Homer Drew	20–8	14–4	T–2nd	
1994–95	Homer Drew	20–8	14–4	1st	
1995–96	Homer Drew	22–10	13–5	1st	NCAA Division I first round
1996–97	Homer Drew	24–7	13–3	1st	NCAA Division I first round
1997–98	Homer Drew	23–10	13–3	1st	NCAA Division I Sweet Sixteen
1998–99	Homer Drew	23–9	10–4	T–1st	NCAA Division I first round
1999–2000	Homer Drew	19–13	10–6	T–2nd	NCAA Division I first round
2000–01	Homer Drew	24–8	13–3	1st	
2001–02	Homer Drew	25–8	12–2	1st	NCAA Division I first round
Scott Drew (Mid–Continent Conference) (2002–2003)
2002–03	Scott Drew	20–11	12–2	1st	NIT first round
Scott Drew:		20–11 (.645)	12–2 (.857)		
Homer Drew (Mid–Continent Conference) (2003–2007)
2003–04	Homer Drew	18–13	11–5	1st	NCAA Division I first round
2004–05	Homer Drew	15–16	10–6	3rd	
2005–06	Homer Drew	17–12	8–8	4th	
2006–07	Homer Drew	16–15	9–5	3rd	
Homer Drew (Horizon League) (2007–2011)
2007–08	Homer Drew	22–14	9–9	4th	CBI quarterfinal
2008–09	Homer Drew	9–22	5–13	9th	
2009–10	Homer Drew	15–17	10–8	4th	
2010–11	Homer Drew	23–12	12–6	4th	CIT first round
Homer Drew:		370–306 (.547)	159–95 (.626)		
Bryce Drew (Horizon League) (2011–2016)
2011–12	Bryce Drew	22–12	14–4	1st	NIT first round
2012–13	Bryce Drew	26–8	13–3	1st	NCAA Division I second round
2013–14	Bryce Drew	18–16	9–7	4th	CIT first round
2014–15	Bryce Drew	28–6	13–3	1st	NCAA Division I second round
2015–16	Bryce Drew	30–7	16–2	1st	NIT Runner–up
Bryce Drew:		124–49 (.717)	65–19 (.774)		
Matt Lottich (Horizon League) (2016–2017)
2016–17	Matt Lottich	24–9	14–4	T–1st	NIT first round
Matt Lottich (Missouri Valley Conference) (2017–2023)
2017–18	Matt Lottich	15–17	6–12	10th	
2018–19	Matt Lottich	15–18	7–11	T–8th	
2019–20	Matt Lottich	19–16	9–9	T–6th	No postseason held
2020–21	Matt Lottich	10–18	7–11	T–5th	
2021–22	Matt Lottich	14–18	6–12	7th	
2022–23	Matt Lottich	11–21	5–15	10th	
Matt Lottich:		108–117(.480)	54–74 (.422)		
Roger Powell (Missouri Valley Conference) (2023–present)
2023–24	Roger Powell Jr	7–25	3–17	12th	
2024–25	Roger Powell Jr	15–19	6–14	11th	
2025–26	Roger Powell Jr	18–15	11–9	T–6th	
Roger Powell:		40–59(.404)	20–40 (.333)		
Total:		1,223–1,136			
National champion Postseason invitational champion Conference regular season champion Conference regular season and conference tournament champion Division regular season champion Division regular season and conference tournament champion Conference tournament champion
