= 1959 Butler Bulldogs football team =

American college football season

1959 Butler Bulldogs football

ICC champion
- Conference: Indiana Collegiate Conference
- Record: 9–0 (6–0 ICC)
- Head coach: Tony Hinkle (19th season)
- Home stadium: Butler Bowl

1959 Indiana Collegiate Conference football standings
	Conf.					Overall
Team	W		L		T	W		L		T
Butler $	6	–	0	–	0	9	–	0	–	0
Evansville	4	–	2	–	0	6	–	3	–	0
Indiana State	3	–	3	–	0	5	–	3	–	0
Saint Joseph's (IN)	3	–	3	–	0	4	–	4	–	0
Valparaiso	3	–	3	–	0	5	–	4	–	0
DePauw	1	–	5	–	0	1	–	7	–	1
Ball State	1	–	5	–	0	1	–	7	–	0
$ – Conference champion

The 1959 Butler Bulldogs football team was an American football team that represented Butler University as a member of the Indiana Collegiate Conference (ICC) during the 1959 college football season. In their 19th year under head coach Tony Hinkle, the Bulldogs compiled a perfect 9–0 record (6–0 in conference games), won the ICC championship, and outscored opponents by a total of 255 to 66. Hinkle rated the 1959 team as his greatest.

Two Butler players, tackle Walt Stockslager and center Jim Ringer, were selected as first-team players on the 1959 All-ICC football team. Five others were named to the second team: quarterback Bob Stryzinski; halfback Cliff Oilar; end Dave Flowers; tackle Jerry Vlasic; and guard Jim Douglas.

Prior to 1959, Butler had not had an undefeated season since 1936. Butler compiled two perfect seasons in three years with both the 1959 and 1961 teams going undefeated and untied. Between October 5, 1957, and October 20, 1962, the Bulldogs won four consecutive ICC championships and lost only two games.

The team played its home games at the Butler Bowl in Indianapolis.

== Schedule ==
Date	Opponent	Site	Result	Attendance	Source
September 19	Bradley*	Butler Bowl; Indianapolis, IN	W 27–8	8,000	
September 26	at Wabash*	Crawfordsville, IN	W 28–8		
October 3	at Saint Joseph's (IN)	Rensselaer, IN	W 20–7		
October 10	Indiana State	Butler Bowl; Indianapolis, IN	W 41–6	7,700	
October 17	at Valparaiso	Valparaiso, IN (rivalry)	W 10–7		
October 24	Ball State	Butler Bowl; Indianapolis, IN	W 27–0	5,500	
October 31	at Evansville	Evansville, IN	W 33–14		
November 7	DePauw	Butler Bowl; Indianapolis, IN	W 21–3		
November 14	Washington University*	Butler Bowl; Indianapolis, IN	W 48–13	6,000	
*Non-conference game

== Players ==
- Egidio Caporale, fullback
- Jim Douglas, guard
- Dave Flowers, end
- Bill Gamblin, guard
- Cliff Oilar, halfback
- Ames Powell, tackle
- Jim Ringer, senior, center, 6'0", 210 pounds, Sullivan, Indiana
- Dick Roberts, end
- John Skirchak, halfback
- Walt Stockslager, senior, tackle, 6'0", 220 pounds, West Milton, Ohio
- Jerry Vlasic, tackle
