= 1961 Valparaiso Crusaders football team =

American college football season

1961 Valparaiso Crusaders football
- Conference: Indiana Collegiate Conference
- Record: 7–2 (5–1 ICC)
- Head coach: Emory Bauer (16th season)

1961 Indiana Collegiate Conference football standings
	Conf.					Overall
Team	W		L		T	W		L		T
Butler $	6	–	0	–	0	9	–	0	–	0
Valparaiso	5	–	1	–	0	7	–	2	–	0
Evansville	3	–	3	–	0	4	–	5	–	0
DePauw	2	–	4	–	0	5	–	4	–	0
Ball State	2	–	4	–	0	2	–	5	–	1
Indiana State	2	–	4	–	0	2	–	6	–	0
Saint Joseph's (IN)	1	–	5	–	0	1	–	7	–	0
$ – Conference champion

The 1961 Valparaiso Crusaders football team represented Valparaiso University as a member of the Indiana Collegiate Conference (ICC) during the 1961 college football season. Led by 16th-year head coach Emory Bauer, the Crusaders compiled an overall record of 7–2 with a mark of 5–1 in conference play, placing second in the ICC.

Valparaiso's senior halfback John Knight.was voted as the most valuable back in the ICC. He set a new ICC record with 686 rushing yards on 118 carries. He also led the ICC in scoring with 44 points (five touchdowns, 14 conversions).

== Schedule ==
Date	Opponent	Site	Result	Attendance	Source
September 16	at Wheaton (IL)*	McCully Field; Wheaton, IL	L 13–35		
September 23	Hope*	Valparaiso, IN	W 14–6		
September 30	at Saint Joseph's (IN)	Rensselaer, IN	W 6–16		
October 7	Indiana State	Brown Field; Valparaiso, IN	W 20–6	4,500	
October 14	Washington University*^{†}	Brown Field; Valparaiso, IN	W 29–0	4,594	
October 21	at Evansville	Evansville, IN	W 29–18		
October 28	Ball State	Brown Field; Valparaiso, IN	W 28–20		
November 4	at Butler	Butler Bowl; Indianapolis, IN (rivalry)	L 2–14	11,200	
November 11	DePauw	Brown Field; Valparaiso, IN	W 35–14	3,447	
*Non-conference game; ^{†}Homecoming
