= 1961 Butler Bulldogs football team =

American college football season

1961 Butler Bulldogs football

ICC champion
- Conference: Indiana Collegiate Conference
- Record: 9–0 (6–0 ICC)
- Head coach: Tony Hinkle (21st season)
- Home stadium: Butler Bowl

1961 Indiana Collegiate Conference football standings
	Conf.					Overall
Team	W		L		T	W		L		T
Butler $	6	–	0	–	0	9	–	0	–	0
Valparaiso	5	–	1	–	0	7	–	2	–	0
Evansville	3	–	3	–	0	4	–	5	–	0
DePauw	2	–	4	–	0	5	–	4	–	0
Ball State	2	–	4	–	0	2	–	5	–	1
Indiana State	2	–	4	–	0	2	–	6	–	0
Saint Joseph's (IN)	1	–	5	–	0	1	–	7	–	0
$ – Conference champion

The 1961 Butler Bulldogs football team was an American football team that represented Butler University as a member of the Indiana Collegiate Conference (ICC) during the 1961 college football season. In their 21st year under head coach Tony Hinkle, the Bulldogs compiled a perfect 9–0 record (6–0 in conference games), won the ICC championship, and outscored opponents by a total of 251 to 65.

Quarterback Phil Long completed 51 of 99 passes for 758 yards with six touchdowns and 12 interceptions. He received received the team's most valuable player award at the end of the 1961 season. During Long's three years with Butler, the team compiled a 26–1 record and won three consecutive ICC championships.

Long, halfback Larry Shook, and tackle Don Benbow won first-team spots on the 1961 All-ICC football team. Long and Benbow were honored for the second consecutive year. Benbow won the team's Hilton Brown award for mental attitude and leadership.

Prior to 1959, Butler had not had an undefeated season since 1936. Butler compiled two perfect seasons in three years with both the 1959 and 1961 teams going undefeated and untied. Between October 5, 1957, and October 20, 1962, the Bulldogs won four consecutive ICC championships and lost only two games.

The team played its home games at the Butler Bowl in Indianapolis.

== Schedule ==
Date	Opponent	Site	Result	Attendance	Source
September 23	Bradley*	Butler Bowl; Indianapolis, IN	W 34–23	6,950	
September 30	Ball State	Butler Bowl; Indianapolis, IN	W 48–6	7,450	
October 7	at Wabash*	Ingalls Field; Crawfordsville, IN (Iron Key)	W 34–7	2,150	
October 14	at DePauw	Greencastle, IN (Old Gold Day)	W 12–6	5,000	
October 21	Saint Joseph's (IN)^{†}	Butler Bowl; Indianapolis, IN	W 27–7	9,000	
October 28	at Indiana State	Terre Haute, IN	W 26–0	1,000–1,100	
November 4	Valparaiso	Butler Bowl; Indianapolis, IN (rivalry)	W 14–2	11,200	
November 11	at Evansville	Evansville, IN	W 30–7	1,000	
November 18	Washington University*	Butler Bowl; Indianapolis, IN	W 26–7		
*Non-conference game; ^{†}Homecoming

== Players ==
- Don Benbow, tackle, senior, 6'0", 220 pounds, Muncie, Indiana
- John Brown, halfback, junior, 5'7", 160 pounds, Indianapolis
- Ken Freeman, end, senior, 6'3", 190 pounds
- Larry Goens, guard, senior, 5'7", 210 pounds
- Gary Green, fullback, senior, 6'0", 190 pounds, Wheatfield, Indiana
- Lee Grimm, guard, sophomore, 6'0", 195 pounds, Indianapolis
- Larry Helms, center, senior, 6'3", 190 pounds
- Jack Krebs, end, senior, 6'2", 165 pounds, Shelbyville, Indiana
- Phil Long, quarterback, senior, 6'0", 175 pounds, Indianapolis
- Pete Madelaus, fullback, sophomore, 6'0", 175 pounds, Detroit
- Phil Mercer, halfback, junior, 5'9", 175 pounds, Indianapolis
- Dave Oberting, quarterback, senior, 6'2", 196 pounds, Indianapolis
- Mickey Seal, halfback, senior, 6'0", 170 pounds
- Larry Shook, halfback, junior, 6'0", 170 pounds, Richmond, Indiana
- Jerry Shultz, tackle, senior, 6'4', 210 pounds, Memphis Tennessee
