= 1957 Ball State Cardinals football team =

American college football season

1957 Ball State Cardinals football
- Conference: Indiana Collegiate Conference
- Record: 2–5–1 (2–3–1 ICC)
- Head coach: Jim Freeman (2nd season)

1957 Indiana Collegiate Conference football standings
	Conf.					Overall
Team	W		L		T	W		L		T
Saint Joseph's (IN) $	5	–	0	–	0	8	–	1	–	0
Butler	5	–	1	–	0	7	–	2	–	0
DePauw	3	–	2	–	0	6	–	2	–	0
Ball State	2	–	3	–	1	2	–	5	–	1
Valparaiso	1	–	2	–	1	4	–	2	–	2
Evansville	1	–	4	–	0	1	–	6	–	0
Indiana State	0	–	5	–	0	1	–	6	–	0
$ – Conference champion

The 1957 Ball State Cardinals football team was an American football team that represented Ball State Teachers College (later renamed Ball State University) in the Indiana Collegiate Conference (ICC) during the 1957 college football season. In its second season under head coach Jim Freeman, the team compiled a 2–5–1 record (2–3–1 against ICC opponents) and finished in fourth place out of seven teams in the ICC.

== Schedule ==
Date	Opponent	Site	Result	Attendance	Source
September 14	at Hanover*	Hanover, IN	L 6–34		
September 21	Illinois State*	Ball State Field; Muncie, IN	L 12–14		
September 28	Valparaiso	Ball State Field; Muncie, IN	T 26–26		
October 12	at Evansville	Evansville, IN	W 27–13		
October 19	DePauw	Ball State Field; Muncie, IN	L 14–40		
October 26	at Butler	Indianapolis, IN	L 7–27		
November 2	Saint Joseph's (IN)	Ball State Field; Muncie, IN	L 7–55		
November 9	at Indiana State	Memorial Stadium; Terre Haute, IN (Blue Key Victory Bell)	W 20–0		
*Non-conference game
