= 1960 Indiana State Sycamores football team =

American college football season

1960 Indiana State Sycamores football
- Conference: Indiana Collegiate Conference
- Record: 3–4 (3–3 ICC)
- Head coach: Bill Jones (4th season)
- Home stadium: Memorial Stadium

1960 Indiana Collegiate Conference football standings
	Conf.					Overall
Team	W		L		T	W		L		T
Butler $	5	–	1	–	0	7	–	1	–	0
Evansville	4	–	2	–	0	5	–	3	–	0
Saint Joseph's (IN)	3	–	2	–	1	3	–	4	–	1
Indiana State	3	–	3	–	0	3	–	4	–	0
Ball State	2	–	4	–	0	3	–	5	–	0
Valparaiso	2	–	4	–	0	3	–	6	–	0
DePauw	1	–	4	–	1	2	–	5	–	1
$ – Conference champion

The 1960 Indiana State Sycamores football team represented Indiana State University as a member of the Indiana Collegiate Conference ICC) during the 1960 college football season. Led by fourth-year head coach Bill Jones, the Sycamores compiled and overall record of 3–4 with a mark of 3–3 in conference play, placing fourth in the ICC. Indiana State played home games at Memorial Stadium in Terre Haute, Indiana.

== Schedule ==
Date	Opponent	Site	Result	Attendance	Source
September 1	at Eastern Illinois*	Lincoln Field; Charleston, IL	L 0–14		
September 24	Evansville	Memorial Stadium; Terre Haute, IN	L 7–11		
October 1	at DePauw	Blackstock Stadium; Greencastle, IN	L 7–15		
October 8	Butler^{†}	Memorial Stadium; Terre Haute, IN	L 13–20		
October 15	at Saint Joseph's (IN)	Saint Joseph's Stadium; Rensselaer, IN	W 21–7		
October 29	Valparaiso	Memorial Stadium; Terre Haute, IN	W 14–13		
November 5	at Ball State	Ball State Field; Muncie, IN (Blue Key Victory Bell)	W 26–23	3,500	
*Non-conference game; ^{†}Homecoming
