= 1960 Ball State Cardinals football team =

American college football season

1960 Ball State Cardinals football
- Conference: Indiana Collegiate Conference
- Record: 3–5 (2–4 ICC)
- Head coach: Jim Freeman (5th season)
- Home stadium: Ball State Field

1960 Indiana Collegiate Conference football standings
| | Conf. | | | | | Overall |
| Team | W | | L | | T | W | | L | | T |
|---|---|---|---|---|---|---|---|---|---|---|
| Butler $ | 5 | – | 1 | – | 0 | 7 | – | 1 | – | 0 |
| Evansville | 4 | – | 2 | – | 0 | 5 | – | 3 | – | 0 |
| Saint Joseph's (IN) | 3 | – | 2 | – | 1 | 3 | – | 4 | – | 1 |
| Indiana State | 3 | – | 3 | – | 0 | 3 | – | 4 | – | 0 |
| Ball State | 2 | – | 4 | – | 0 | 3 | – | 5 | – | 0 |
| Valparaiso | 2 | – | 4 | – | 0 | 3 | – | 6 | – | 0 |
| DePauw | 1 | – | 4 | – | 1 | 2 | – | 5 | – | 1 |
$ – Conference champion

The 1960 Ball State Cardinals football team was an American football team that represented Ball State Teachers College (later renamed Ball State University) in the Indiana Collegiate Conference (ICC) during the 1960 college football season. In its fifth season under head coach Jim Freeman, the team compiled a 3–5 record and tied for fifth place out of seven teams in the ICC.

== Schedule ==
| Date | Opponent | Site | Result | Attendance | Source |
|---|---|---|---|---|---|
| September 17 | at Illinois State* | Normal, IL | L 3–7 | 4,200 | |
| September 24 | vs. Valparaiso | Fort Wayne, IN | L 8–10 | 3,700 | |
| October 1 | Eastern Illinois* | Ball State Field; Muncie, IN | W 14–6 | 6,500 | |
| October 8 | Evansville | Ball State Field; Muncie, IN | L 7–10 | 9,000 | |
| October 15 | at DePauw | Greencastle, IN | W 24–20 | 4,000 | |
| October 22 | Butler | Ball State Field; Muncie, IN | L 0–27 | 5,200 | |
| October 29 | at Saint Joseph's (IN) | Rensselaer, IN | W 23–7 | 2,000 | |
| November 5 | Indiana State | Ball State Field; Muncie, IN (Blue Key Victory Bell) | L 23–26 | 3,500 | |
*Non-conference game
