= 1961 Ball State Cardinals football team =

American college football season

1961 Ball State Cardinals football
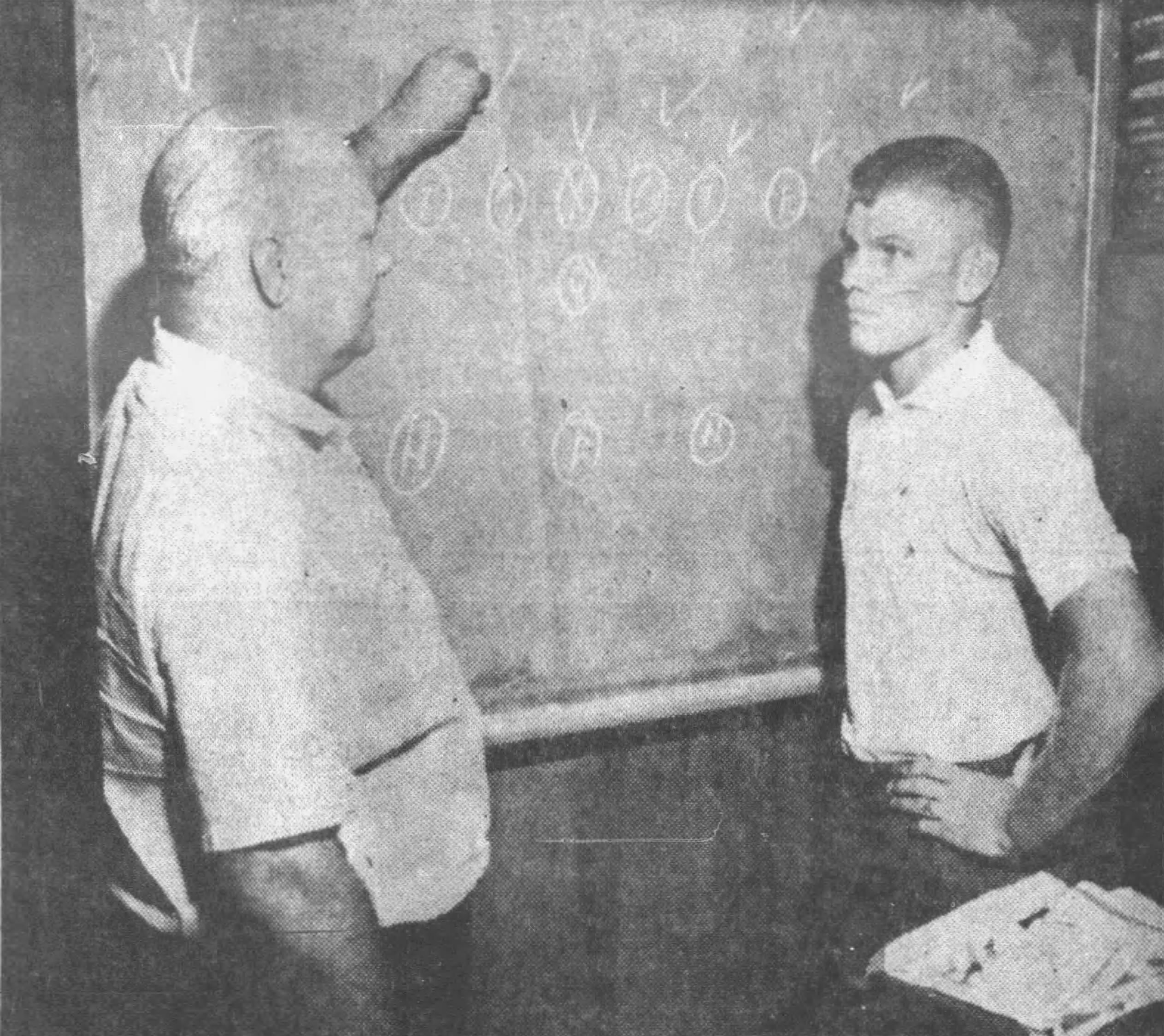
- Head coach Jim Freeman diagrams a play for quarterback Phil Sullivan, 1961
- Conference: Indiana Collegiate Conference
- Record: 2–5–1 (2–4 ICC)
- Head coach: Jim Freeman (6th season)
- Captains: Peter Jubeck; Al Thomas
- Home stadium: Ball State Field

1961 Indiana Collegiate Conference football standings
	Conf.					Overall
Team	W		L		T	W		L		T
Butler $	6	–	0	–	0	9	–	0	–	0
Valparaiso	5	–	1	–	0	7	–	2	–	0
Evansville	3	–	3	–	0	4	–	5	–	0
DePauw	2	–	4	–	0	5	–	4	–	0
Ball State	2	–	4	–	0	2	–	5	–	1
Indiana State	2	–	4	–	0	2	–	6	–	0
Saint Joseph's (IN)	1	–	5	–	0	1	–	7	–	0
$ – Conference champion

The 1961 Ball State Cardinals football team was an American football team that represented Ball State College (later renamed Ball State University) in the Indiana Collegiate Conference (ICC) during the 1961 college football season. In its sixth season under head coach Jim Freeman, the Cardinals compiled a 2–5–1 record, were outscored by a total of 179 to 68, and finished in a three-way tie for fourth place out of seven teams in the ICC.

Fullback Peter Jubeck and center Al Thomas were the team's co-captains.

== Schedule ==
Date	Opponent	Site	Result	Attendance	Source
September 23	Eastern Michigan*	Ball State Field; Muncie, IN	T 0–0	> 7,500	
September 30	at Butler	Butler Bowl; Indianapolis, IN	L 6–48	7,450	
October 7	DePauw	Ball State Field; Muncie, IN	L 8–10		
October 14	at Saint Joseph's (IN)	Rensselaer, IN	W 8–0		
October 21	Indiana State^{†}	Ball State Field; Muncie, IN (Blue Key Victory Bell)	L 0–41	> 9,000	
October 28	at Valparaiso	Valparaiso, IN	L 20–28		
November 4	Evansville	Ball State Field; Muncie, IN	W 6–3		
November 11	at Ohio Northern*	Ada, OH	L 20–49		
*Non-conference game; ^{†}Homecoming

== Statistics ==
The Cardinals tallied 1,729 yards of total offense (216.1 yards per game), consisting of 1,256 rushing yards (157 yards per game) and 473 passing yards (59.1 yards per game). On defense, the Cardinals gave up 2,102 yards (262.8 yards per game) with and 1,496 rushing yards (187 yards per game) and 606 passing yards (75.8 yards per game).

The team set a program record by losing 33 fumbles in a season -- an average of more than four fumbles lost per game. The record remains unbroken as of the 2024 season.

Senior quarterback Phil Sullivan led the team in passing, completing 20 of 69 passes (28.9% completion percentage) for 269 yards. He also led the team with 374 yards of total offense.

Halfback Joe Burvan in rushing, tallying 278 rushing yards on 54 carries for an average of 5.1 yards per carry.

Halfback Joe Robinson led the team in scoring with 20 points on three touchdowns and a two-point conversion.

End Larry Hamel was the team's receiving leader with 145 receiving yards on 9 receptions for an average of 16.1 yards per reception.

== Awards ==
The John Magnabosco Award for the most outstanding player of 1961 went to center and co-captain Al Thomas.

== Players ==
- Jim Biltz, halfback, 156 pounds
- Terry Bonta, quarterback, sophomore, 170 pounds
- John Burtrum, halfback, 175 pounds
- Joe Burvan, halfback, 170 pounds
- Frank Cerqueira, tackle, sophomore, 196 pounds
- Larry Dreasky, fullback, sophomore, 173 pounds
- Colin Duffala, end
- Jim Freeman, guard, 215 pounds
- Larry Hamell (sometimes Hamel), end, 209 pounds
- Ted Huber, guard, 190 pounds
- Don Hunter, center
- Peter Jubeck (sometimes listed as Jubek), fullback and co-captain, senior
- Dick Lootens, guard, 187 pounds
- George McKay, end, 204 pounds
- Dick Rinehart, tackle, 221 pounds
- Joe Robinson, halfback, 180 pounds
- John Shipley, quarterback, 161 pounds
- Max Smith, end
- Phil Sullivan, quarterback, senior, 160 pounds
- Al Thomas, center and co-captain, 207 pounds
- John Walker, halfback
- Ron Webb, end, 193 pounds
- Dave Welcome, tackle, 225 pounds
- Bob Wetnight, fullback, sophomore
- Jim Zielinski, tackle, 224 pounds

Jim Freeman was regarded as one of the ICC's best lineman, sustained a serious knee injury in the Cardinals' homecoming loss to Indiana State and was lost to the team for the remainder of the season.
