= List of Manhattan Jaspers men's basketball head coaches =

The following is a list of Manhattan Jaspers men's basketball head coaches. There have been 25 head coaches of the Jaspers in their 117-season history.

Manhattan's current head coach is John Gallagher. He was hired in March 2023, replacing RaShawn Stores, who was not promoted to the full-time position after serving as interim coach for the 2022–23 season following the firing of Steve Masiello just before the year.

No.	Tenure	Coach	Years	Record	Pct.
1	1904–1909	John O'Donnell	5	22–33	.400
2	1909–1912; 1913–1920	Edward Hanrahan	10	74–72	.507
3	1912–1913	Fred J. Murphy	1	8–10	.444
4	1920–1922	Edward P. Winters	2	3–11	.214
5	1922–1924; 1925–1926	Arthur T. Carroll	3	26–21	.553
6	1924–1925	Ward Brennan	1	10–10	.500
7	1926–1928	Chief Muller	2	22–12	.647
8	1928–1929	James Houlihan	1	4–11	.267
9	1929–1942	Neil Cohalan	13	165–82	.668
10	1942–1943	Joe Daher	1	18–3	.857
11	1945–1946	Honey Russell	1	15–8	.652
12	1946–1968	Ken Norton	22	310–205	.602
13	1968–1978	John Powers	10	142–114	.555
14	1978–1981	Brian Mahoney	3	16–62	.205
15	1981–1985	Gordon Chiesa	4	43–68	.387
16	1985–1986	Tom Sullivan	1	2–26	.071
17	1986–1988	Bob Delle Bovi	2	13–44	.228
18	1988–1992	Steve Lappas	4	56–62	.475
19	1992–1996	Fran Fraschilla	4	86–34	.717
20	1996–1999	John Leonard	3	26–57	.313
21	1999–2006	Bobby Gonzalez	7	129–77	.626
22	2006–2011	Barry Rohrssen	5	58–95	.379
23	2011–2022	Steve Masiello	11	162–177	.478
24	2022–2023* (Note: Steve Masiello was fired on October 25, 2022. Stores was named interim head coach for the 2022–23 season.)	RaShawn Stores	1	12–18	.400
25	2023–present	John Gallagher	0	0–0	–
Totals		25 coaches	117 seasons	1,422–1,312	.520
Records updated through end of 2022–23 season Source
