= 1958 Ball State Cardinals football team =

American college football season

1958 Ball State Cardinals football
- Conference: Indiana Collegiate Conference
- Record: 6–2 (4–2 ICC)
- Head coach: Jim Freeman (3rd season)

1958 Indiana Collegiate Conference football standings
	Conf.					Overall
Team	W		L		T	W		L		T
Butler $	5	–	1	–	0	8	–	1	–	0
Ball State	4	–	2	–	0	6	–	2	–	0
Saint Joseph's (IN)	4	–	2	–	0	5	–	4	–	0
Valparaiso	3	–	3	–	0	6	–	3	–	0
Evansville	3	–	3	–	0	4	–	5	–	0
DePauw	1	–	5	–	0	2	–	7	–	0
Indiana State	1	–	5	–	0	2	–	6	–	0
$ – Conference champion

The 1958 Ball State Cardinals football team was an American football team that represented Ball State Teachers College (later renamed Ball State University) in the Indiana Collegiate Conference (ICC) during the 1958 college football season. In their third season under head coach Jim Freeman, the Cardinals compiled a 6–2 record (4–2 against ICC opponents).

== Schedule ==
Date	Opponent	Site	Result	Attendance	Source
September 20	at Illinois State*	McCormick Field; Normal, IL	W 31–14		
September 27	at Valparaiso	Valparaiso, IN	L 0–6		
October 4	Wooster*	Muncie, IN	W 14–6	7,000	
October 11	Evansville	Muncie, IN	W 35–16	9,000	
October 18	at DePauw	Greencastle, IN (Old Gold Day)	W 20–6	4,000	
October 25	Butler	Muncie, IN	W 14–7	3,000	
November 1	at Saint Joseph's (IN)	Rensselaer, IN	L 0–6		
November 8	Indiana State	Muncie, IN (Blue Key Victory Bell)	W 26–8		
*Non-conference game
