= 1959 Ball State Cardinals football team =

American college football season

1959 Ball State Cardinals football
- Conference: Indiana Collegiate Conference
- Record: 1–7 (1–5 ICC)
- Head coach: Jim Freeman (4th season)

1959 Indiana Collegiate Conference football standings
	Conf.					Overall
Team	W		L		T	W		L		T
Butler $	6	–	0	–	0	9	–	0	–	0
Evansville	4	–	2	–	0	6	–	3	–	0
Indiana State	3	–	3	–	0	5	–	3	–	0
Saint Joseph's (IN)	3	–	3	–	0	4	–	4	–	0
Valparaiso	3	–	3	–	0	5	–	4	–	0
DePauw	1	–	5	–	0	1	–	7	–	1
Ball State	1	–	5	–	0	1	–	7	–	0
$ – Conference champion

The 1959 Ball State Cardinals football team was an American football team that represented Ball State Teachers College (later renamed Ball State University) in the Indiana Collegiate Conference (ICC) during the 1959 college football season. In its fourth season under head coach Jim Freeman, the team compiled a 1–7 record and finished in last place in the ICC.

== Schedule ==
Date	Opponent	Site	Result	Attendance	Source
September 19	Illinois State*	Ball State Field; Muncie, IN	L 6–22	5,500	
September 26	Valparaiso	Ball State Field; Muncie, IN	L 6–24	5,000	
October 3	at Eastern Illinois*	Lincoln Field; Charleston, IL	L 8–14	1,200	
October 10	at Evansville	Evansville, IN	L 0–10	3,000	
October 17	DePauw	Ball State Field; Muncie, IN	W 30–24	9,000	
October 24	at Butler	Indianapolis, IN	L 0–27	5,500	
October 31	Saint Joseph's (IN)	Ball State Field; Muncie, IN	L 8–22	2,500	
November 7	at Indiana State	Terre Haute, IN (Blue Key Victory Bell)	L 8–29	1,000	
*Non-conference game
