= 1961 Illinois State Normal Redbirds football team =

American college football season

1961 Illinois State Normal Redbirds football
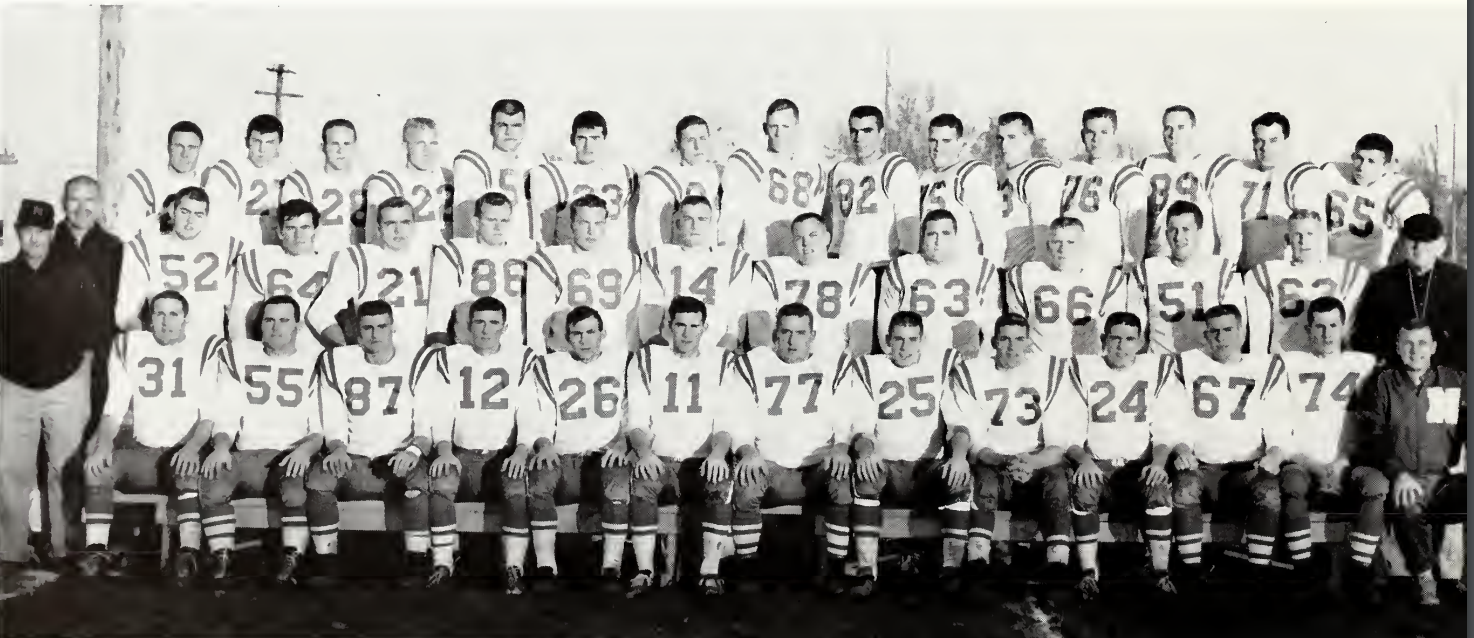
- Official 1961 team portrait from "The Index" yearbook
- Conference: Interstate Intercollegiate Athletic Conference
- Record: 5–4 (4–2 IIAC)
- Head coach: Edwin Struck (17th season)
- MVP: Ron Schieber
- Captains: Keith Rieger; Dave Babcock
- Home stadium: McCormick Field

1961 Interstate Intercollegiate Athletic Conference football standings
	Conf.					Overall
Team	W		L		T	W		L		T
Southern Illinois $	5	–	1	–	0	7	–	3	–	0
Western Illinois	4	–	2	–	0	5	–	3	–	0
Illinois State Normal	4	–	2	–	0	5	–	4	–	0
Eastern Illinois	3	–	2	–	1	4	–	3	–	1
Northern Illinois	3	–	2	–	1	4	–	4	–	1
Central Michigan	1	–	5	–	0	2	–	8	–	0
Eastern Michigan	0	–	6	–	0	0	–	8	–	1
$ – Conference champion

The 1961 Illinois State Normal Redbirds football team was an American football team that represented Illinois State Normal University (now known as Illinois State University) as a member of the Interstate Intercollegiate Athletic Conference (IIAC) during the 1961 college football season. In their 17th year under head coach Edwin Struck, the Redbirds compiled a 5–4 record (4–2 in conference games), tied for second place in the IIAC, and were outscored by a total of 142 to 129.

The team played its home games at McCormick Field in Normal, Illinois.

== Schedule ==
Date	Opponent	Site	Result	Attendance	Source
September 23	Millikin*	McCormick Field; Normal, IL	L 16–22	1,000	
September 30	at Eastern Illinois	Lincoln Field; Charleston, IL (rivalry)	W 18–0	2,000	
October 6	at Eastern Michigan	Briggs Field; Ypsilanti, MI	W 13–0		
October 14	Central Michigan	McCormick Field; Normal, IL	W 32–21	5,000	
October 21	at Northern Michigan*	Memorial Stadium; Marquette, MI	L 6–47		
October 28	Southern Illinois^{†}	McCormick Field; Normal, IL	L 14–34	6,000	
November 4	at Northern Illinois	Glidden Field; DeKalb, IL	W 7–0	11,500	
November 11	at Western Illinois	Hanson Field; Macomb, IL	L 7–12	4,000	
November 18	Illinois Wesleyan*	McCormick Field; Normal, IL	W 16–6	4,000	
*Non-conference game; ^{†}Homecoming

== Statistics ==
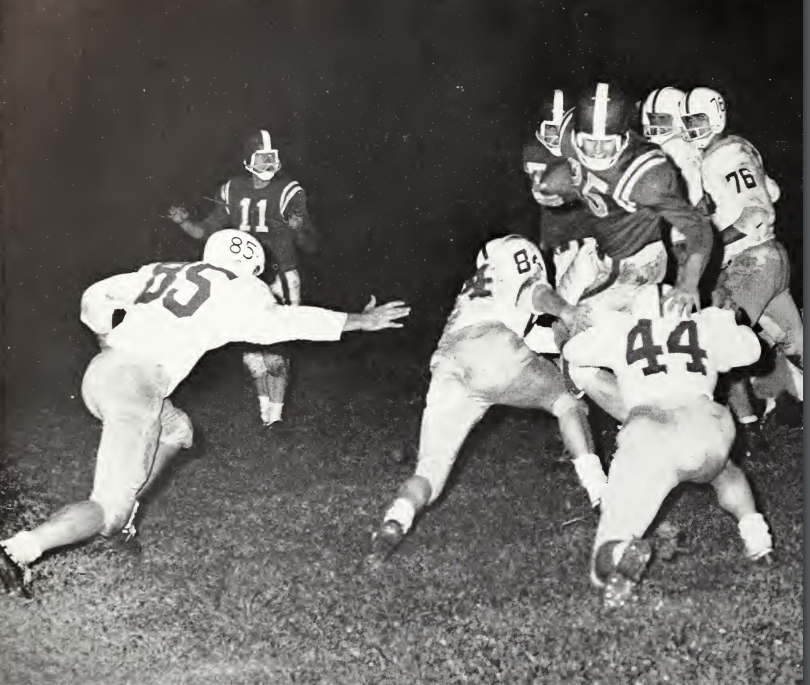
Ron Schieber carries the ball against Central Michigan

The 1961 Redbirds gained 1,913 yards of total offense (212.5 per game) consisting of 1,358 rushing yards (150.8 per game) and 555 passing yards (61.6 per game). On defense, they gave up 2,279 yards (253.2 per game), including 1,431 rushing yard (159 per game) and 848 passing yards (94.2 per game).

The team's leading rushers were halfbacks Ron Schieber (577 yards, 134 carries) and Bert Popejoy (424 yards, 100 carries, 4.24-yard average). Schieber also led the team in total offense (577 yards) and scoring (54 points on nine touchdowns).

Quarterback Keith Rieger completed 52 of 121 passes (42.9%) for 540 yards with five touchdowns and six interceptions. End Bill Monken was the leading receiver with 22 catches for 304 yards and two touchdowns.

== Awards and honors ==
Senior quarterback Keith Rieger from Forrest, Illinois, and senior tackle Dave Babock from Cerro Gordo, Illinois, were the team's co-captains.

Halfback Ron Schieber was selected as the team's most valuable player for the 1961 season.

Three Illinois State players received first-team honors on the 1961 All-IIAC football team: Bill Monken at offensive end; Tom Mackiewicz at defensive end; and Dave Babcock at defensive tackle.

== Gallery ==
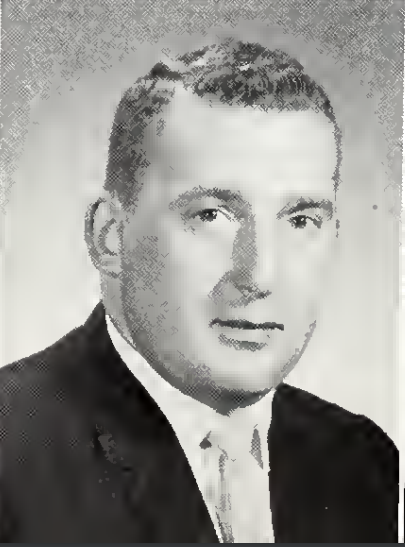
Tackle Dave Babcock

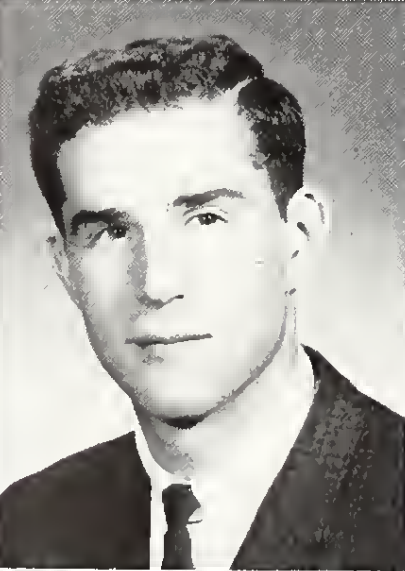
Quarterback Keith Rieger

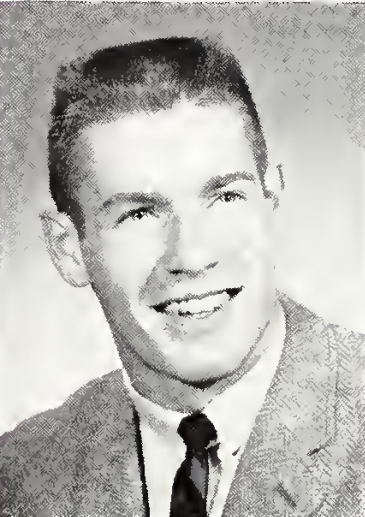
Halfback Ron Schieber
