= 1961 Eastern Illinois Panthers football team =

American college football season

1961 Eastern Illinois Panthers football
- Conference: Interstate Intercollegiate Athletic Conference
- Record: 4–3–1 (3–2–1 IIAC)
- Head coach: Ralph Kohl (5th season)
- Home stadium: Lincoln Field

1961 Interstate Intercollegiate Athletic Conference football standings
	Conf.					Overall
Team	W		L		T	W		L		T
Southern Illinois $	5	–	1	–	0	7	–	3	–	0
Western Illinois	4	–	2	–	0	5	–	3	–	0
Illinois State Normal	4	–	2	–	0	5	–	4	–	0
Eastern Illinois	3	–	2	–	1	4	–	3	–	1
Northern Illinois	3	–	2	–	1	4	–	4	–	1
Central Michigan	1	–	5	–	0	2	–	8	–	0
Eastern Michigan	0	–	6	–	0	0	–	8	–	1
$ – Conference champion

The 1961 Eastern Illinois Panthers football team represented Eastern Illinois University as a member of the Interstate Intercollegiate Athletic Conference (IIAC) during the 1961 college football season. The team was led by fifth-year head coach Ralph Kohl and played their home games at Lincoln Field in Charleston, Illinois. The Panthers finished the season with a 4–3–1 record overall and a 3–2–1 record in conference play.

== Schedule ==
Date	Opponent	Site	Result	Attendance	Source
September 23	at Indiana State*	Memorial Stadium; Terre Haute, IN	W 23–20		
September 30	Illinois State Normal	Lincoln Field; Charleston, IL (rivalry)	L 0–18	2,000	
October 7	Ferris Institute*	Lincoln Field; Charleston, IL	L 16–20	940	
October 14	Northern Illinois	Lincoln Field; Charleston, IL	T 20–20	3,600–7,000	
October 21	at Southern Illinois	McAndrew Stadium; Carbondale, IL	L 6–33	13,000	
October 28	Eastern Michigan	Lincoln Field; Charleston, IL	W 0–7	583	
November 4	Western Illinois	Lincoln Field; Charleston, IL	W 14–0	997–4,000	
November 11	at Central Michigan	Alumni Field; Mount Pleasant, MI	W 22–13	5,000	
*Non-conference game
