= Bill Sylvester =

American football player, coach, and administrator (1928–2022)

Biographical details
- Born: August 21, 1928; Indianapolis, Indiana, U.S.
- Died: March 30, 2022 (aged 93)

Playing career
- 1946–1948: Butler
- Position: Quarterback

Coaching career (HC unless noted)
- 1953–1959: Scecina Memorial HS (IN)
- 1960: Purdue (assistant)
- 1961–1963: Indianapolis Cathedral HS (IN) (assistant)
- 1964–1969: Butler (assistant)
- 1970–1984: Butler

Administrative career (AD unless noted)
- 1975–1989: Butler

Head coaching record
- Overall: 84–65–2 (college)
- Tournaments: 0–1 (NCAA D-II playoffs)

Accomplishments and honors

Championships
- 5 ICC (1972–1975, 1977); 1 HCC (1983)

William L. Sylvester (August 21, 1928 – March 30, 2022) was an American football player and coach and college athletics administrator. He served as the head football coach at Butler University in Indianapolis, Indiana from 1970 to 1984, compiling a record of 84–65–2. Sylvester was also the athletic director at Butler from 1975 to 1989.

== Head coaching record ==
=== College ===
Year	Team	Overall	Conference	Standing	Bowl/playoffs
Butler Bulldogs (Indiana Collegiate Conference) (1970–1977)
1970	Butler	3–6–1	2–2	3rd	
1971	Butler	3–7	1–3	T–5th	
1972	Butler	5–5	4–1	T–1st	
1973	Butler	5–5	4–1	1st	
1974	Butler	8–2	6–0	1st	
1975	Butler	9–1	6–0	1st	
1976	Butler	6–4	2–3	T–4th	
1977	Butler	5–5	3–1	T–1st	
Butler Bulldogs (Heartland Collegiate Conference) (1978–1984)
1978	Butler	5–5	3–2	T–2nd	
1979	Butler	5–5	3–2	3rd	
1980	Butler	5–5	3–4	T–5th	
1981	Butler	3–7	2–5	T–5th	
1982	Butler	7–3	5–2	T–2nd	
1983	Butler	9–1–1	5–0–1	1st	L NCAA Division II First Round
1984	Butler	6–4	4–2	T–2nd	
Butler:		84–65–2	55–28–1		
Total:		84–65–2			
National championship Conference title Conference division title or championship game berth
