= Bill Jones (Indiana State football coach) =

American football player and coach (1914–1999)

Biographical details
- Born: October 2, 1914; Clinton, Indiana, U.S.
- Died: May 25, 1999 (aged 84)

Playing career
- 1935–1938: Ohio Wesleyan
- Position: Fullback

Coaching career (HC unless noted)
- 1939–1956: Sullivan HS (IN)
- 1957–1965: Indiana State

Head coaching record
- Overall: 32–37 (college); 80–51–5 (high school)

Accomplishments and honors

Awards
- 3× ICC Coach of the Year (1959, 1960, 1963)

William Jones (October 2, 1914 – May 25, 1999) was an American football player and coach. He served as the head football coach at Indiana State University in Terre Haute, Indiana from 1957 to 1965. A graduate of Ohio Wesleyan University, Jones was named the most valuable player by his teammate his senior year.

In the fall of 1957, Jones became the head football coach at Indiana State University, where he served through 1965. During his tenure, he won the program's only Indiana Collegiate Conference championship and was named conference Coach of the Year three times. He ranks fourth in the program's history for coaching wins.

He held degrees from Ohio Wesleyan (B.A.) and Indiana State (M.A.); he won conferences titles at Indiana State as well as Sullivan High.

== Head coaching record ==
=== College ===
Year	Team	Overall	Conference	Standing	Bowl/playoffs
Indiana State Sycamores (Indiana Collegiate Conference) (1957–1965)
1957	Indiana State	1–6	0–6	7th	
1958	Indiana State	2–6	1–5	T–6th	
1959	Indiana State	5–3	3–3	T–3rd	
1960	Indiana State	3–4	3–3	4th	
1961	Indiana State	2–6	2–4	T–4th	
1962	Indiana State	5–3	4–2	T–2nd	
1963	Indiana State	4–4	2–4	T–5th	
1964	Indiana State	6–2	4–2	T–1st	
1965	Indiana State	4–3–1	2–3–1	4th	
Indiana State:		32–37–1	21–31–1		
Total:		32–37–1			
National championship Conference title Conference division title or championship game berth
