= 1961 Western Illinois Leathernecks football team =

American college football season

1961 Western Illinois Leathernecks football
- Conference: Interstate Intercollegiate Athletic Conference
- Record: 5–3 (4–2 IIAC)
- Head coach: Art Dufelmeier (2nd season)
- Home stadium: Hanson Field

1961 Interstate Intercollegiate Athletic Conference football standings
	Conf.					Overall
Team	W		L		T	W		L		T
Southern Illinois $	5	–	1	–	0	7	–	3	–	0
Western Illinois	4	–	2	–	0	5	–	3	–	0
Illinois State Normal	4	–	2	–	0	5	–	4	–	0
Eastern Illinois	3	–	2	–	1	4	–	3	–	1
Northern Illinois	3	–	2	–	1	4	–	4	–	1
Central Michigan	1	–	5	–	0	2	–	8	–	0
Eastern Michigan	0	–	6	–	0	0	–	8	–	1
$ – Conference champion

The 1961 Western Illinois Leathernecks football team was an American football team that represented Western Illinois University as a member of the Interstate Intercollegiate Athletic Conference (IIAC) during the 1961 college football season. In their second year under head coach Art Dufelmeier, the Leathernecks compiled a 5–3 record (4–2 in conference games) and tied for second place in the IIAC.

Halfback Leroy Jackson led the team with 560 rushing yards and 56 points scored. He also finished third in the NCAA in the 100-yard dash, received first-team honors on the 1961 Little All-America college football team, and was selected by the Cleveland Browns in the first round (11th overall pick) of the 1962 NFL draft.

Quarterback Bill Roper led the team with 635 passing yards.

== Schedule ==
Date	Opponent	Rank	Site	Result	Attendance	Source
September 30	Eastern Michigan		Hanson Field; Macomb, IL	W 43–0	4,000	
October 7	at Central Michigan		Alumni Field; Mount Pleasant, MI	W 12–7	5,000–5,100	
October 14	No. 5 Southern Illinois		Hansn Field; Macomb, IL	W 22–13	9,900	
October 21	at Northern Illinois		Glidden Field; De Kalb, IL	L 22–23	12,000–14,000	
October 28	at Evansville*		Evansville, IN	W 26–0	3,800–5,000	
November 4	at Eastern Illinois		Lincoln Field; Charleston, IL	L 0–14	997–4,000	
November 11	Illinois State Normal		Hanson Field; Macomb, IL	W 12–7	4,000	
November 18	Bradley*		Hanson Field; Macomb, IL	L 18–23	4,500	
*Non-conference game; Rankings from AP Poll released prior to the game
