= 1961 Northern Illinois Huskies football team =

American college football season

1961 Northern Illinois Huskies football
- Conference: Interstate Intercollegiate Athletic Conference
- Record: 4–4–1 (3–2–1 IIAC)
- Head coach: Howard Fletcher (6th season)
- MVP: Tom Beck
- Captains: Marv Baker; Tom Beck
- Home stadium: Glidden Field

1961 Interstate Intercollegiate Athletic Conference football standings
	Conf.					Overall
Team	W		L		T	W		L		T
Southern Illinois $	5	–	1	–	0	7	–	3	–	0
Western Illinois	4	–	2	–	0	5	–	3	–	0
Illinois State Normal	4	–	2	–	0	5	–	4	–	0
Eastern Illinois	3	–	2	–	1	4	–	3	–	1
Northern Illinois	3	–	2	–	1	4	–	4	–	1
Central Michigan	1	–	5	–	0	2	–	8	–	0
Eastern Michigan	0	–	6	–	0	0	–	8	–	1
$ – Conference champion

The 1961 Northern Illinois Huskies football team represented Northern Illinois University as a member of the Interstate Intercollegiate Athletic Conference (IIAC) during the 1961 college football season. Led by sixth-year head coach Howard Fletcher, the Huskies compiled an overall record of 4–4–1 with a mark of 3–2–1 in conference play, tying for third place in the IIAC.

The team tallied 2,270 yards of total offense (252.2 yards per game), consisting of 851 rushing yards and 1,419 passing yards. On defense, the Bulldogs gave up 2,343 yards of total offense (260.3 yards per game), consisting of 1,704 rushing yards and 639 passing yards.

The team's statistical leaders included quarterback George Bork with 841 passing yards, halfbacks Mickey Stevens with 225 rushing yards, end Rich Bader with 430 receiving yards, and halfbacks/fullback Gary Starns with 38 points scored.

The team played its home games at the 5,500-seat Glidden Field, located on the east end of campus, in DeKalb, Illinois.

== Schedule ==
Date	Opponent	Site	Result	Attendance	Source
September 16	Northwest Missouri State*	Glidden Field; DeKalb, IL	W 49–0	4,000	
September 23	Wheaton (IL)*	Glidden Field; DeKalb, IL	L 2–7	3,600	
September 29	at Northeast Missouri State*	Stokes Stadium; Kirksville, MO	L 13–28	2,300–4,100	
October 7	at No. 4 Southern Illinois	McAndrew Stadium; Carbondale, IL	L 6–35	10,500	
October 14	Eastern Illinois	Lincoln Field; Charleston, IL	T 20–20	3,600–7,000	
October 21	Western Illinois^{†}	Glidden Field; DeKalb, IL	W 23–22	12,000–14,000	
October 28	at Central Michigan	Mount Pleasant, MI	W 11–0	8,000–8,100	
November 4	Illinois State Normal	Glidden Field; DeKalb, IL	L 0–7	11,500	
November 11	Eastern Michigan	Glidden Field; DeKalb, IL	W 35–10	4,700	
*Non-conference game; ^{†}Homecoming; Rankings from AP Poll released prior to the game
