= 1961 Southern Illinois Salukis football team =

American college football season

1961 Southern Illinois Salukis football

IIAC champion
- Conference: Interstate Intercollegiate Athletic Conference
- Record: 7–3 (5–1 IIAC)
- Head coach: Carmen Piccone (3rd season)
- Home stadium: McAndrew Stadium

1961 Interstate Intercollegiate Athletic Conference football standings
	Conf.					Overall
Team	W		L		T	W		L		T
Southern Illinois $	5	–	1	–	0	7	–	3	–	0
Western Illinois	4	–	2	–	0	5	–	3	–	0
Illinois State Normal	4	–	2	–	0	5	–	4	–	0
Eastern Illinois	3	–	2	–	1	4	–	3	–	1
Northern Illinois	3	–	2	–	1	4	–	4	–	1
Central Michigan	1	–	5	–	0	2	–	8	–	0
Eastern Michigan	0	–	6	–	0	0	–	8	–	1
$ – Conference champion

The 1961 Southern Illinois Salukis football team was an American football team that represented Southern Illinois University) as a member of the Interstate Intercollegiate Athletic Conference (IIAC) during the 1961 college football season. In their third year under head coach Carmen Piccone, the Salukis compiled a 7–3 record (5–1 in conference games) and won the IIAC championship.

The team was led on offense by quarterback Ron Winter and running back Amos Bullocks who broke Southern Illinois' career records for passing yards (Winter, 2,054 yards), total offense (Winter, yards), rushing yards (Bullocks, 2,441 yards) and scoring (Bullocks, 206 points).

The team played its home games at McAndrew Stadium in Carbondale, Illinois.

== Schedule ==
Date	Opponent	Rank	Site	Result	Attendance	Source
September 16	at Missouri Mines*		Rolla, MO	W 44–0	3,000	
September 23	Drake*		McAndrew Stadium; Carbondale, IL	L 0–7	10,000	
September 30	Central Michigan		McAndrew Stadium; Carbondale, IL	W 18–0	5,500	
October 7	Northern Illinois	No. 4	McAndrew Stadium; Carbondale, IL	W 35–6	10,500	
October 14	at Western Illinois	No. 5	Hanson Field; Macomb, IL	L 13–22	9,900	
October 21	Eastern Illinois^{†}		McAndrew Stadium; Carbondale, IL	W 33–6	13,000	
October 28	at Illinois State Normal		McCormick Field; Normal, IL	W 34–14	6,000	
November 4	at Eastern Michigan		Briggs Field; Ypsilanti, MI	W 20–14		
November 11	La Crosse State*		McAndrew Stadium; Carbondale, IL	W 47–13	8,000	
November 18	Bowling Green*		McAndrew Stadium; Carbondale, IL	L 0–20	7,000–7,500	
*Non-conference game; ^{†}Homecoming; Rankings from AP Poll released prior to the game

== Statistics ==
Senior quarterback Ron Winter led the team with 1,123 yards of total offense. In his three years playing for Southern Illinois, Winter set a new school record with 2,054 passing yards. He also tallied 672 rushing yards to set a new school record with 2,726 yards of total offense.

Amos Bullocks also set new career records at Southern Illinois with 2,441 rushing yards and 206 points scored. He led the team with 875 rushing yards in 1961. The team's other leading rushers were Charles Hamilton (403 yards), Ron Winter (285 yards), Dennis Harley (275 yards), Charles Lerch (272 yards), and Charles Kimbrel (160 yards).

Junior end Charles O'Neill led the team in pass receiving, catching 23 passes for 385 yards.

The team's scoring leaders were Amos Bullocks (60 points), Hamilton (44 points), Winter (36 points), and Lerch (30 points).

== Awards and honors ==
Ron Winter was selected by his teammates as the most valuable player on the 1961 Southern Illinois team. Winter missed two early games with a dislocated shoulder, but came in strong in the remaining games. He was one of the lightest players on the team at 175 pounds and was described as "an agile, quick-thinking runner who employs his blockers with tremendous skill."

Seven Southern Illinois players received first-team honors on the 1961 IIAC all-conference football team: Winter at quarterback; Amos Bullocks at back; Sam Silas at offensive tackle; Jim Thompson and Frank Imperiale at defensive tackle; Jim Minton at linebacker; and Denny Harmon at defensive back.
