= 1961 Central Michigan Chippewas football team =

American college football season

1961 Central Michigan Chippewas football
- Conference: Interstate Intercollegiate Athletic Conference
- Record: 2–8 (1–5 IIAC)
- Head coach: Kenneth Kelly (11th season)
- MVP: Jim Hasse
- Home stadium: Alumni Field

1961 Interstate Intercollegiate Athletic Conference football standings
	Conf.					Overall
Team	W		L		T	W		L		T
Southern Illinois $	5	–	1	–	0	7	–	3	–	0
Western Illinois	4	–	2	–	0	5	–	3	–	0
Illinois State Normal	4	–	2	–	0	5	–	4	–	0
Eastern Illinois	3	–	2	–	1	4	–	3	–	1
Northern Illinois	3	–	2	–	1	4	–	4	–	1
Central Michigan	1	–	5	–	0	2	–	8	–	0
Eastern Michigan	0	–	6	–	0	0	–	8	–	1
$ – Conference champion

The 1961 Central Michigan Chippewas football team represented Central Michigan University in the Interstate Intercollegiate Athletic Conference (IIAC) during the 1961 college football season. In their 11th season under head coach Kenneth Kelly, the Chippewas compiled a 2–8 record (1–5 against IIAC opponents) and were outscored by their opponents by a combined total of 214 to 95.

The team's statistical leaders included quarterback Gary Harrington with 239 passing yards and Chuck Koons with 402 rushing yards and 130 receiving yards. Guard Jim Hasse received the team's most valuable player award. Two Central Michigan players (Hasse and defensive end Bill Johnson) received first-team honors on the All-IIAC team.

== Schedule ==
Date	Opponent	Site	Result	Attendance	Source
September 9	vs. Northern Michigan*	Arthur Hill Stadium; Saginaw, MI	L 0–35	8,500	
September 16	Western Michigan*	Alumni Field; Mount Pleasant, MI (rivalry)	L 21–27	6,800	
September 21	at Youngstown*	Youngstown, OH	L 7–36	7,500	
September 30	at Southern Illinois	McAndrew Stadium; Carbondale, IL	L 0–18	5,500	
October 7	Western Illinois	Alumni Field; Mount Pleasant, MI	L 7–12	5,000–5,100	
October 14	at Illinois State Normal	McCormick Field; Normal, IL	L 21–32	5,000	
October 21	at Eastern Michigan	Briggs Field; Ypsilanti, MI (rivalry)	W 13–11	5,500	
October 28	Northern Illinois^{†}	Alumni Field; Mount Pleasant, MI	L 0–11	8,000–8,100	
November 4	Hillsdale*	Alumni Field; Mount Pleasant, MI	W 13–10	5,000	
November 11	Eastern Illinois	Alumni Field; Mount Pleasant, MI	L 13–22	5,000	
*Non-conference game; ^{†}Homecoming
