= Ed Dwyer =

American football player and coach (1932–2007)

Biographical details
- Born: July 27, 1932; Camden, New Jersey, U.S.
- Died: December 8, 2007 (aged 75); Indianapolis, Indiana, U.S.

Playing career
- 1952–1955: Purdue
- Position: End

Coaching career (HC unless noted)
- 1961–1964: Saint Joseph's (IN)
- 1967–1969: Indiana Central

Head coaching record
- Overall: 11–47–2

Edward F. Dwyer (September 27, 1932 – December 8, 2007) was an American college football player and coach.

Dwyer played college football at Purdue, where he started at end. He was selected by the Cleveland Browns in the 27th round of the 1956 NFL draft but never played pro football. He served as the head football coach at St. Joseph's College of Rensselaer, Indiana from 1961 to 1964 and at Indiana Central College—now known as the University of Indianapolis—from 1967 to 1969, compiling a career head coaching record of 11–47–2.

== Head coaching record ==
| Year | Team | Overall | Conference | Standing | Bowl/playoffs |
|---|---|---|---|---|---|
Saint Joseph's Pumas (Indiana Collegiate Conference) (1961–1964)
| 1961 | Saint Joseph's | 1–7 | 1–5 | 7th | |
| 1962 | Saint Joseph's | 4–4–1 | 3–3 | T–4th | |
| 1963 | Saint Joseph's | 2–7 | 1–5 | 7th | |
| 1964 | Saint Joseph's | 0–8 | 0–6 | 7th | |
| Saint Joseph's: | | 7–26–1 | 5–19 | | |
Indiana Central Greyhounds (Hoosier Conference) (1967–1969)
| 1967 | Indiana Central | 1–7–1 | 1–5 | 7th | |
| 1968 | Indiana Central | 2–6 | 1–5 | T–6th | |
| 1969 | Indiana Central | 1–8 | 1–5 | 7th | |
| Indiana Central: | | 4–21–1 | 3–15 | | |
| Total: | | 11–47–2 | | | |
