= Denbo, Pennsylvania =

Unincorporated community in Pennsylvania, US

Denbo
- Unincorporated community / coal town
- Interactive map of Denbo
- Coordinates: 40.012°N 79.932°W
- Country: United States
- State: Pennsylvania
- County: Washington
- Borough: Centerville
- Elevation: 791 ft (241 m)
- ZIP code: 15429
- GNIS feature ID: 1192348

Denbo is a populated place in the Centerville, Washington County, Pennsylvania, United States. It is a coal patch town, located near the former Vesta No. 6 Mine.

== History ==
Vesta No. 6 was owned and operated by Jones and Laughlin Steel Company. It was located in the Klondike Coalfield. A patch town was built to house miners. The mine ran from about 1903 until 1947. The entryway was sealed and covered over.

== Notable people ==
- Joe Freeman, football player and coach
- Joe Ratica, football player
