= 1961 Eastern Michigan Hurons football team =

American college football season

1961 Eastern Michigan Hurons football
- Conference: Interstate Intercollegiate Athletic Conference
- Record: 0–8–1 (0–6 IIAC)
- Head coach: Fred Trosko (10th season)
- MVP: Norm Jacobs
- Captains: Norm Jacobs; Don Drinkham
- Home stadium: Briggs Field

1961 Interstate Intercollegiate Athletic Conference football standings
	Conf.					Overall
Team	W		L		T	W		L		T
Southern Illinois $	5	–	1	–	0	7	–	3	–	0
Western Illinois	4	–	2	–	0	5	–	3	–	0
Illinois State Normal	4	–	2	–	0	5	–	4	–	0
Eastern Illinois	3	–	2	–	1	4	–	3	–	1
Northern Illinois	3	–	2	–	1	4	–	4	–	1
Central Michigan	1	–	5	–	0	2	–	8	–	0
Eastern Michigan	0	–	6	–	0	0	–	8	–	1
$ – Conference champion

The 1961 Eastern Michigan Hurons football team was an American football team that represented Eastern Michigan University as a member of the Interstate Intercollegiate Athletic Conference (IIAC) during the 1961 college football season. In their 10th season under head coach Fred Trosko, the Hurons compiled a 0–8–1 record (0–6 in conference games), finished last in the IIAC, and were outscored by a total of 171 to 49. The team's only game that was not a loss was a scoreless tie with Ball State. The 1961 season was part of a 30-game winless streak that spanned from 1959 to 1962.

Norm Jacobs and Don Drinkham were the team captains. Jacobs received the team's most valuable player award. Jacobs was also selected as a first-team all-IIAC player on both offense (at center) and on defense (at guard).

The team's statistical leaders included George Beaudette with 696 passing yards and 703 yards of total offense, Don Oboza with 207 rushing yards, and Pat Dignan with 195 receiving yards.

The team played its home games at Briggs Field in Ypsilanti, Michigan.

== Schedule ==
Date	Opponent	Site	Result	Attendance	Source
September 16	at Albion*	Alumni Field; Albion, MI	L 0–13	1,500–4,000	
September 23	at Ball State*	Ball State Field; Muncie, IN	T 0–0	> 7,500	
September 30	at Western Illinois	Hanson Field; Macomb, IL	L 0–43	4,000	
October 6	Illinois State Normal	Briggs Field; Ypsilanti, MI	L 0–13		
October 13	No. 7 Baldwin–Wallace*	Briggs Field; Ypsilanti, MI	L 14–27	1,500	
October 21	Central Michigan^{†}	Briggs Field; Ypsilanti, MI (rivalry)	L 11–13	5,500	
October 28	at Eastern Illinois	Lincoln Field; Charleston, IL	L 0–7	583	
November 4	Southern Illinois	Briggs Field; Ypsilanti, MI	L 14–20		
November 11	at Northern Illinois	Glidden Field; DeKalb, IL	L 10–35	4,700	
*Non-conference game; ^{†}Homecoming; Rankings from AP Poll released prior to the game

== Statistics ==
The 1961 Hurons gained 1,559 yards of total offense (173.3 yards per game), consisting of 814 rushing yards (90.4 yards per game) and 745 passing yards (82.8 yards per game). On defense, they gave up 1,914 yards (212.7 yards per game) with 1,102 rushing yards (122.4 yards per game) and 821 passing yards (91.1 yards per game).

Senior quarterback George Beaudette (6'2", 215 pounds) completed 50 of 155 passes (32.2%) for 696 yards with three touchdowns and 14 interceptions. Beaudette also led the team in total offense with 703 yards on 191 plays (3.7 yards per play).

The team's rushing leaders were fullback Don Oboza (207 yards, 75 carries, 2.7-yard average) and halfback Ray Smith (94 yards, 34 carries, 2.7-yard average).

The team's receiving leaders were halfbacks Pat Dignan (12 catches, 195 yards, one touchdown) and Lavern Mann (four catches, 138 yards, two touchdowns). Mann led the team in scoring with 12 points on two touchdown receptions.

Senior fullback Dave Catherman (6'0", 135 pounds) punted 51 times for 1,614 yards, an average of 31.6 yards per punt.
