= Tony Hinkle =

American college football and basketball coach (1899–1992)

Biographical details
- Born: December 19, 1899; Logansport, Indiana, U.S.
- Died: September 22, 1992 (aged 92); Indianapolis, Indiana, U.S.

Playing career

Football
- 1918–1920: Chicago

Basketball
- 1918–1921: Chicago

Baseball
- 1918–1920: Chicago
- Positions: End (football); Guard (basketball)

Coaching career (HC unless noted)

Football
- 1921–1925: Butler (assistant)
- 1926: Butler
- 1935–1941: Butler
- 1942–1943: Great Lakes Navy
- 1946–1969: Butler

Basketball
- 1926–1942: Butler
- 1942–1944: Great Lakes Navy
- 1945–1970: Butler

Baseball
- 1921–1928: Butler
- 1933–1941: Butler
- 1942–1944: Great Lakes Navy (assistant)
- 1946–1970: Butler

Administrative career (AD unless noted)
- 1926–1927: Butler
- 1931–1942: Butler
- 1945–1970: Butler

Head coaching record
- Overall: 183–104–16 (football); 560–392 (basketball); 335–309–3 (baseball)
- Tournaments: Basketball; 2–1 (NCAA University Division); 1–2 (NIT)

Accomplishments and honors

Championships
- Football; 8 IIC (1935–1940, 1946–1947); 9 ICC (1952, 1953, 1958–1964) Basketball; 2 MVC regular season (1933–1934); MAC regular season (1947); 7 ICC regular season (1952–1954, 1959, 1961, 1962, 1970)
- Basketball Hall of Fame; Inducted in 1965 (profile)
- College Basketball Hall of Fame; Inducted in 2006

Paul D. "Tony" Hinkle (December 19, 1899 – September 22, 1992) was an American football, basketball, and baseball player, coach, and college athletic administrator. He attended the University of Chicago, where he won varsity letters in three sports. Hinkle captained the Chicago Maroons basketball team for two seasons and was twice selected as an All-American, in 1919 and 1920. After graduating from the University of Chicago, Hinkle moved on to Butler University as a coach. There, over the course of nearly 50 years, he served as the head football coach (1926, 1935–1941, 1946–1969), head basketball coach (1926–1942, 1945–1970), and head baseball coach (1921–1928, 1933–1941, 1946–1970). Hinkle was inducted into the Naismith Memorial Basketball Hall of Fame as a contributor in 1965. Butler's home basketball arena was renamed as Hinkle Fieldhouse in the coach's honor in 1966.

== Early life and playing career ==
Hinkle was born in Logansport, Indiana, to Edgar Clayton and Winnie (Ray) Hinkle. He graduated in 1917 from Calumet High School in Chicago, Illinois, and attended the University of Chicago from 1917 to 1921. As a player at Chicago, he lettered three times in basketball, was twice All-Big Ten, twice team captain, named to the Helms All-America team in 1919 and 1920, and was a member of the Big Ten Conference championship team in 1919–20 that lost the national championship to Penn.

== Coaching career ==
Hinkle joined Butler University in 1921 when it was still at the Irvington campus; the university bought Fairview Park in 1922 and moved the campus there in 1928. At Butler, Hinkle served as a teacher, coach and athletic administrator for nearly half a century. Although he coached football, basketball, and baseball, he was primarily known as a basketball coach. His teams were fearless, gaining a reputation as "Big Ten killers". In 1929, the Butler Bulldogs basketball team he led to a 17–2 record was crowned national champion; in 1924. He had been the assistant coach when they won the National AAU Tournament and received similar honors. Overall, his basketball teams scored 560 victories versus 392 defeats, and he tallied more than 1,000 victories in all sports.

Hinkle was instrumental in ending the rule providing for a jump ball after every basket and in the introduction of the three-second rule.

Basketballs were generally brown until Hinkle introduced the orange basketball in the late 1950s. He also came up with the "Hinkle System" offense strategy, based on a complex system of motion, passes, picks and screens; it was adopted by many of the over 200 high school and college coaches trained by Hinkle.

Hinkle was president of the National Association of Basketball Coaches from 1954 to 1955, and served on their board. He won the NABC's top award in 1962 for contributions to the betterment of the game of basketball. He was named chairman of the Rules Committee of the National Basketball Committee of the U.S. and Canada. Hinkle was inducted into the Naismith Memorial Basketball Hall of Fame in 1965, the Indiana Basketball Hall of Fame in 1964, and the Indiana Football Hall of Fame in 1974.

Hinkle's legacy is remembered on the Butler campus with Hinkle Fieldhouse, longtime site of Indiana's state high school championships and featured in the film Hoosiers. The fieldhouse, originally named Butler Fieldhouse, was the largest basketball arena in the United States for decades. It was renamed as Hinkle Fieldhouse in 1966. Hinkle coached 41 seasons of basketball at Butler, ending in 1970, and remained with Butler University until his death in 1992.

Hinkle is buried alongside his wife, Jane Murdock Stewart Hinkle (1907–1959) at Crown Hill Cemetery in Indianapolis.

== Head coaching record ==
=== Football ===
Year	Team	Overall	Conference	Standing	Bowl/playoffs	AP^{#}
Butler Bulldogs (Independent) (1926)
1926	Butler	3–6				
Butler Bulldogs (Indiana Intercollegiate Conference) (1935–1941)
1935	Butler	7–1	6–0	1st		
1936	Butler	6–0–2	5–0	1st		
1937	Butler	5–2–1	3–0–1	1st		
1938	Butler	4–4	3–0	1st		
1939	Butler	7–0–1	4–0	1st		
1940	Butler	4–4–1	4–0	T–1st		
1941	Butler	5–4	3–1	T–3rd		
Great Lakes Navy Bluejackets (Independent) (1942–1943)
1942	Great Lakes Navy	8–3–1				
1943	Great Lakes Navy	10–2				6
Great Lakes Navy:		18–5–3				
Butler Bulldogs (Indiana Intercollegiate Conference) (1946)
1946	Butler	7–1	6–0	1st		
Butler Bulldogs (Indiana Intercollegiate Conference / Mid-American Conference) (1947)
1947	Butler	5–3–1	/ 1–3	1st / T–3rd		
Butler Bulldogs (Mid-American Conference) (1948–1949)
1948	Butler	3–5	0–4	6th		
1949	Butler	2–6	0–3	6th		
Butler Bulldogs (Independent) (1950)
1950	Butler	4–4–1				
Butler Bulldogs (Indiana Collegiate Conference) (1951–1969)
1951	Butler	4–4–1	3–2	3rd		
1952	Butler	5–3–1	3–1–1	T–1st		
1953	Butler	6–2	5–0	1st		
1954	Butler	4–4–1	3–2	4th		
1955	Butler	3–5	3–3	4th		
1956	Butler	6–2	5–1	2nd		
1957	Butler	7–2	5–1	2nd		
1958	Butler	8–1	5–1	1st		
1959	Butler	9–0	6–0	1st		
1960	Butler	8–1	5–1	1st		
1961	Butler	9–0	6–0	1st		
1962	Butler	5–2–2	4–1–1	1st		
1963	Butler	8–1	6–0	1st		
1964	Butler	4–4–1	4–2	T–1st		
1965	Butler	6–3	4–2	2nd		
1966	Butler	4–5	4–2	T–2nd		
1967	Butler	2–7	1–5	T–6th		
1968	Butler	2–7	1–3	4th		
1969	Butler	3–6	2–2	3rd		
Butler:		183–104–16				
Total:		183–104–16				
National championship Conference title Conference division title or championship game berth
^{#}Rankings from final AP Poll.

=== Basketball ===
1929 Butler basketball national championship trophy awarded by the Veteran Athletes of Philadelphia

Record table
Season	Team	Overall	Conference	Standing	Postseason
Butler Bulldogs (Independent) (1926–1932)
1926–27	Butler	17–4			
1927–28	Butler	19–3			
1928–29	Butler	17–2			John J. McDevitt; National Championship Trophy (Veteran Athletes of Philadelphia)
1929–30	Butler	12–8			
1930–31	Butler	17–2			
1931–32	Butler	14–5			
Butler Bulldogs (Missouri Valley Conference) (1932–1934)
1932–33	Butler	16–5	9–1	1st	
1933–34	Butler	14–7	9–1	1st	
Butler Bulldogs (Independent) (1934–1942)
1934–35	Butler	13–7			
1935–36	Butler	6–15			
1936–37	Butler	6–15			
1937–38	Butler	11–12			
1938–39	Butler	14–6			
1939–40	Butler	17–6			
1940–41	Butler	13–9			
1941–42	Butler	13–9			
Great Lakes Navy Bluejackets (Independent) (1942–1944)
1942–43	Great Lakes Navy	34–3			Sugar Bowl Classic Championship
1943–44	Great Lakes Navy	33–3			
Great Lakes Navy:		67–6 (.918)			
Butler Bulldogs (Independent) (1945–1946)
1945–46	Butler	12–8			
Butler Bulldogs (Mid-American Conference) (1946–1950)
1946–47	Butler	16–7	4–1	1st	
1947–48	Butler	14–7	4–2	2nd	
1948–49	Butler	18–5	8–2	2nd	
1949–50	Butler	12–12	6–4	3rd	
Butler Bulldogs (Indiana Collegiate Conference) (1950–1970)
1950–51	Butler	5–19	3–9		
1951–52	Butler	12–12	10–2	1st	
1952–53	Butler	14–9	9–3	1st	
1953–54	Butler	13–12	7–4	1st	
1954–55	Butler	10–14	8–4		
1955–56	Butler	14–9	8–4		
1956–57	Butler	11–14	6–6		
1957–58	Butler	16–10	10–2		NIT first round
1958–59	Butler	19–9	10–2	1st	NIT quarterfinal
1959–60	Butler	15–11	10–2		
1960–61	Butler	15–11	10–2	1st	
1961–62	Butler	22–6	10–2	1st	NCAA University Division Regional Third Place
1962–63	Butler	16–10	10–2		
1963–64	Butler	13–13	9–3		
1964–65	Butler	11–15	5–7		
1965–66	Butler	16–10	8–4		
1966–67	Butler	9–17	5–7		
1967–68	Butler	11–14	6–6		
1968–69	Butler	11–15	4–4		
1969–70	Butler	15–11	6–2	1st	
Butler:		560–392 (.588)	248–88 (.738)		
Total:		560–392 (.588)			
National champion Postseason invitational champion Conference regular season champion Conference regular season and conference tournament champion Division regular season champion Division regular season and conference tournament champion Conference tournament champion

== See also ==
- List of college football head coaches with non-consecutive tenure
