= Jim Freeman (American football) =

American football player and coach (1914–2015)

- Freeman, c. 1960

Biographical details
- Born: January 23, 1914; Denbo, Pennsylvania, U.S.
- Died: August 11, 2015 (aged 101); Cape Coral, Florida, U.S.

Playing career
- 1935–1937: Indiana
- Position: Guard

Coaching career (HC unless noted)
- 1946–1947: Connecticut (line)
- 1948–1951: Indiana (line)
- 1956–1961: Ball State

Head coaching record
- Overall: 18–28–2

James Andrew Sirtosky (January 23, 1914 – August 11, 2015), known as Jim Freeman, was an American football player and coach, drafted in the ninth round of the 1938 NFL draft. He served as the head football coach at Ball State Teachers College—now Ball State University—from 1956 to 1961, compiling a record of 18–28–2. Born January 23, 1914, he turned 100 in 2014 and died on August 11, 2015, aged 101.

== Head coaching record ==
Year	Team	Overall	Conference	Standing	Bowl/playoffs
Ball State Cardinals (Indiana Collegiate Conference) (1956–1961)
1956	Ball State	4–4	2–4	5th	
1957	Ball State	2–5–1	2–3–1	4th	
1958	Ball State	6–2	4–2	T–2nd	
1959	Ball State	1–7	1–5	T–6th	
1960	Ball State	3–5	2–4	T–5th	
1961	Ball State	2–5–1	2–4	T–4th	
Ball State:		18–28–2	13–22–1		
Total:		18–28–2			
