= Chief Muller =

American basketball player and coach

Charles Fred "Chief" Muller (March 7, 1885 – March 10, 1956) was an American basketball player and coach.

== Playing ==
He had a long professional career for multiple teams, including Norwalk, South Side, Paterson, Gloversville, and Yonkers. He, Ed Wachter, and Jack Inglis led the Troy club to multiple championships, but Muller quit the team in 1913 rather than pay a $10 fine for an infraction of team rules. He was the player-coach of Newburgh team the following season, but when club moved to Syracuse, New York in January 1914, he rejoined the Trojans for the remainder of the season. He was the second leading scorer in the New York State League that season, scoring 481 points in 60 games. He was a member of the Gloversville team for the 1914–15 season. He later played for Jersey City, the Bronx Athletic Club, De Neri, Camden, and Wilkes-Barre.

Muller started the 1919–20 season with the North Philadelphia Americans, but he and Andy Suils were sold to the Trenton Bengals in November 1919. Muller also played for Troy and Ansonia that season. In February 1920, he was suspended indefinitely by the Bengals for failure to report to certain games. He spent his final seasons as a member of the Gloversville, Cohoes, Troy, Wilkes-Barre, and Hartford clubs.

== Coaching ==
Muller coached professional teams in Newburgh, New York, Wilkes-Barre, Pennsylvania, Gloversville, New York, and Hartford, Connecticut. From 1926 to 1928, he was the head coach at Manhattan College and compiled a 22–12 record. He later coached at Xavier High School and Holy Trinity High School in Brooklyn.

== Death ==
On March 10, 1956, Muller died of a heart attack while taking a bus in the Bronx after a fishing trip on City Island. He was 71 years old.
