= Conrad Moll =

American football, basketball, and baseball coach

Biographical details
- Born: November 27, 1899
- Died: March 26, 1987 (aged 87); Truth or Consequences, New Mexico, U.S.

Coaching career (HC unless noted)

Football
- 1926: Valparaiso

Basketball
- 1926–1927: Valparaiso

Baseball
- 1927–1928: Valparaiso

Head coaching record
- Overall: 1–4–1 (football); 10–10 (basketball); 1–9 (baseball)

Conrad Stephen Moll (November 27, 1899 – March 26, 1987) was an American football, basketball, and baseball coach. He was a graduate of Concordia College (Indiana), also attended Indiana University and in 1925 attended the Y.M.C.A. College of Physical Education in Chicago. He served as the head football, basketball and baseball coach at Valparaiso University during the 1926–27 academic year. He continued coaching baseball Valparaiso in 1928. Moll died on March 26, 1987, in Truth or Consequences, New Mexico.

== Head coaching record ==
=== Football ===
Year	Team	Overall	Conference	Standing	Bowl/playoffs
Valparaiso Crusaders (Independent) (1926)
1926	Valparaiso	1–4–1			
Valparaiso:		1–4–1			
Total:		1–4–1			
