= Millard Anderson =

American athlete, coach, and college athletics administrator

Playing career

Football
- c. 1923: Valparaiso

Basketball
- c. 1923: Valparaiso

Baseball
- c. 1923: Valparaiso
- Positions: End (football); Center (basketball); Catcher (baseball)

Coaching career (HC unless noted)

Football
- 1925: Valparaiso

Basketball
- 1925–1926: Valparaiso

Baseball
- 1926: Valparaiso

Administrative career (AD unless noted)
- 1925–1926: Valparaiso

Head coaching record
- Overall: 1–6 (football); 6–13 (basketball); 3–4 (baseball)

Millard "Andy" Anderson was an American football, basketball, and baseball player, coach, and college athletics administrator. He served as the athletic director and head football, basketball, and baseball coach at Valparaiso University during the 1925–26 academic year. Anderson graduated from Valparaiso in 1924. He played football, basketball, and baseball as a student-athlete. Anderson coached at Key West High School from 1926 to 1929. Thereafter he worked as a civil engineer until 1970.

== Head coaching record ==
=== Football ===
Year	Team	Overall	Conference	Standing	Bowl/playoffs
Valparaiso Crusaders (Western Interstate Conference) (1925)
1925	Valparaiso	1–6	0–3	T–6th	
Valparaiso:		1–6	0–3		
Total:		1–6			
