= Earl Scott (coach) =

American football and basketball coach

Coaching career (HC unless noted)

Football
- 1927–1928: Valparaiso

Basketball
- 1927–1929: Valparaiso

Head coaching record
- Overall: 2–11 (football); 22–14(basketball)

Earl Scott was an American football and basketball coach. He served as the head football and basketball coach at Valparaiso University during the 1927–28 and 1928–29 academic years.

== Head coaching record ==
| Year | Team | Overall | Conference | Standing | Bowl/playoffs |
|---|---|---|---|---|---|
Valparaiso Crusaders (Independent) (1927–1928)
| 1927 | Valparaiso | 1–5 | | | |
| 1928 | Valparaiso | 1–6 | | | |
| Valparaiso: | | 2–11 | | | |
| Total: | | 2–11 | | | |
