= Loren Ellis =

American football and basketball coach and college athletics administrator

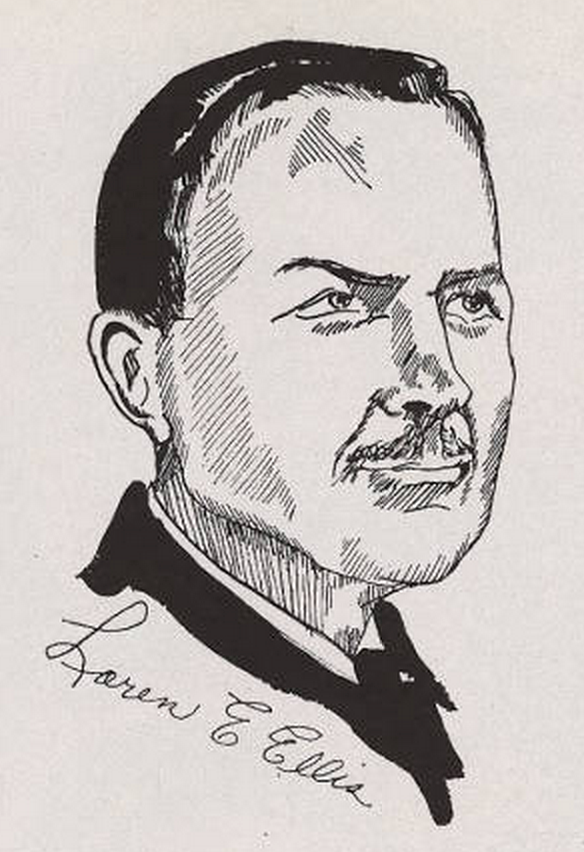
- Ellis pictured in The Beacon 1943, Valparaiso yearboo

Biographical details
- Born: January 7, 1904
- Died: December 19, 1984 (aged 80); Eustis, Florida, U.S.

Coaching career (HC unless noted)

Football
- 1941: Valparaiso (assistant)
- 1942–1945: Valparaiso

Basketball
- 1930–1941: Michigan City HS (IN)
- 1941–1947: Valparaiso
- 1950–1951: Stetson

Administrative career (AD unless noted)
- 1942–1949: Valparaiso

Head coaching record
- Overall: 10–5 (college football); 101–71 (college basketball); 132–95 (high school basketball); 21-41 (pro basketball)

Accomplishments and honors

Championships
- Football; 1 IIC (1945)

Loren Edward Ellis (January 7, 1904 – December 19, 1984) was an American football and basketball coach and college athletics administrator. He served as the head basketball coach at Valparaiso University from 1941 to 1947 and at Stetson University during the 1950–51 season, compiling a career college basketball record of 101–71. His best squad was his 1944–45 team, they finished with a 21–3 record and a 10-game winning streak. They were inducted into the Valparaiso Hall of Fame in 2004. His best player was Robert Dille, a consensus All-American following the 1943–44 season.

Ellis was also the football coach at Valparaiso from 1942 to 1945, though the school did not field a football team in 1943 or 1944. He tallied a total record of 10–5, his 1945 squad won the Indiana Intercollegiate Conference championship, with an overall record of 6–1. He remains to this day, the winningest coach (by percentage) in Valparaiso history.

Ellis served as the university's athletic director; he resigned following the 1947 season in order to accept the position of head coach and general manager of the Hammond Buccaneers of the National Basketball League (NBL). When that franchise folded in 1949, he accepted the position of head coach basketball at Stetson University.

Ellis was graduate of Indiana State Teachers College—now known as Indiana State University. He was the head basketball coach at Michigan City High School in Michigan City, Indiana from 1930 to 1941; totaling a record of 132-95 (.592), with 3 Sectional titles, 2 Regional titles and 2 berths in the State Semi-Finals. Ellis died on December 19, 1984, in Eustis, Florida, following an illness lasting six months.

== Head coaching record ==
=== College football ===
Year	Team	Overall	Conference	Standing	Bowl/playoffs
Valparaiso Crusaders (Indiana Intercollegiate Conference) (1942–1945)
1942	Valparaiso	4–4	3–2	6th	
1943	No team—World War II				
1944	No team—World War II				
1945	Valparaiso	6–1	4–0	1st	
Valparaiso:		10–5	7–2		
Total:		10–5			
National championship Conference title Conference division title or championship game berth
