= Earl Goheen =

American football, basketball, and baseball coach

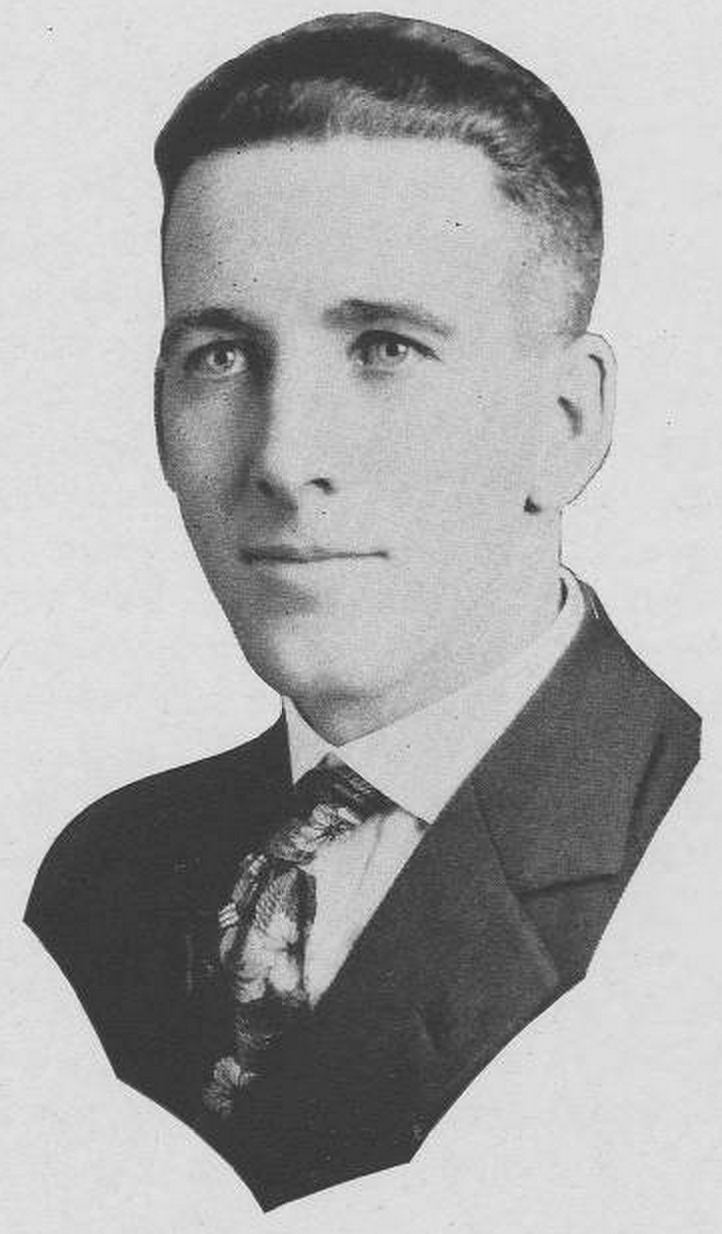
- Pictured in The Record 1922, Valparaiso yearbook

Biographical details
- Born: June 11, 1895; Minnesota, U.S.
- Died: August 29, 1985 (aged 90); Los Angeles, California, U.S.

Coaching career (HC unless noted)

Football
- 1921–1922: Valparaiso

Basketball
- 1921–1923: Valparaiso

Baseball
- 1922–1923: Valparaiso

Head coaching record
- Overall: 5–4–3 (football); 30–12 (basketball); 17–5 (baseball)

Earl J. Goheen (June 11, 1895 – August 29, 1985) was an American football, basketball, and baseball coach. He served as head football, basketball, and baseball coach at Valparaiso University during the 1921–22 and 1922–23 academic years. In 1932 he became head football coach at his alma mater, Saint Thomas Academy in Minnesota.

== Head coaching record ==
=== Football ===
Year	Team	Overall	Conference	Standing	Bowl/playoffs
Valparaiso Crusaders (Independent) (1921–1922)
1921	Valparaiso	2–2–1			
1922	Valparaiso	3–2–2			
Valparaiso:		5–4–3			
Total:		5–4–3			
