= Emory Bauer =

American football, basketball, and baseball coach

Biographical details
- Born: February 13, 1913; Herscher, Illinois, U.S.
- Died: October 1, 1989 (aged 76); Valparaiso, Indiana, U.S.

Coaching career (HC unless noted)

Football
- 1934–1940: Herscher HS (IL)
- 1941–1942: Concordia Teachers (IL)
- 1943–1944: Iowa Pre-Flight (assistant)
- 1946–1967: Valparaiso

Basketball
- 1947–1948: Valparaiso

Baseball
- 1954–1981: Valparaiso

Administrative career (AD unless noted)
- 1970–1975: Valparaiso

Head coaching record
- Overall: 114–89–8 (college football); 8–15 (college basketball); 361–243–2 (college baseball); 32–16 (high school football)
- Bowls: 0–1

Accomplishments and honors

Championships
- Football; 4 ICC (1951–1951, 1954, 1964)

Emory George Bauer (February 13, 1913 – October 1, 1989) was an American football, basketball, and baseball coach and college athletics administrator. He served as the head football coach at Concordia Teachers College—now known as Concordia University Chicago–in River Forest, Illinois from 1941 to 1942 and at Valparaiso University from 1946 to 1967, compiling a career college football record of 114–89–8. Bauer was also the head basketball coach at Valparaiso for one season in 1947–48, tallying a mark of 8–15, and the school's head baseball coach from 1954 to 1981, amassing a record of 361–243–2. He was Valparaiso's athletic director from 1970 to 1975.

== Head coaching record ==
=== College football ===
Year	Team	Overall	Conference	Standing	Bowl/playoffs
Concordia Teachers (Independent) (1941–1942)
1941	Concordia Teachers	3–4			
1942	Concordia Teachers	2–4–1			
Concordia Teachers:		5–8–1			
Valparaiso Crusaders (Indiana Intercollegiate Conference) (1946)
1946	Valparaiso	1–7	0–3	15th	
Valparaiso Crusaders (Independent) (1947–1950)
1947	Valparaiso	2–5–1			
1948	Valparaiso	4–5			
1949	Valparaiso	8–1–1			
1950	Valparaiso	9–1			L Cigar
Valparaiso Crusaders (Indiana Collegiate Conference) (1951–1967)
1951	Valparaiso	9–0	4–0	1st	
1952	Valparaiso	5–3–1	3–1–1	T–1st	
1953	Valparaiso	5–2–1	3–2	T–2nd	
1954	Valparaiso	6–2–1	5–1	1st	
1955	Valparaiso	5–4	4–2	3rd	
1956	Valparaiso	6–4	4–2	3rd	
1957	Valparaiso	4–2–2	1–2–1	5th	
1958	Valparaiso	6–3	3–3	T–4th	
1959	Valparaiso	5–4	3–3	T–3rd	
1960	Valparaiso	3–6	2–4	T–5th	
1961	Valparaiso	7–2	5–1	2nd	
1962	Valparaiso	6–3	4–2	T–2nd	
1963	Valparaiso	3–6	3–3	T–3rd	
1964	Valparaiso	6–3	4–2	T–1st	
1965	Valparaiso	3–6	2–4	T–5th	
1966	Valparaiso	3–6	1–5	T–6th	
1967	Valparaiso	3–6	1–5	T–6th	
Valparaiso:		109–81–7	52–45–2		
Total:		114–89–8			
National championship Conference title Conference division title or championship game berth
