= Hoosier Helmet Trophy =

Rivalry trophy between the Butler Bulldogs and the Valparaiso Crusaders

- Butler Bulldogs Valparaiso Beacons
- Sport: Football
- First meeting: October 1, 1927; Butler 58, Valparaiso 0
- Latest meeting: September 26, 2026; Butler 33, Valparaiso 28
- Next meeting: 2027
- Trophy: Hoosier Helmet Trophy

Statistics
- Total meetings: 86
- All-time series: Butler leads, 56–30
- Trophy series: Butler leads, 15–7
- Largest victory: Butler, 72–12 (2013)
- Longest win streak: Butler, 13 (1981–1993)
- Current win streak: Butler, 5 (2022–present)

Locations of Butler and Valparaiso

The Hoosier Helmet Trophy is the name of the rivalry trophy between the Butler Bulldogs and Valparaiso Beacons.

== History ==
Both schools are members of the Pioneer Football League. Butler and Valparaiso first played in 1927, and have played each other in football every year since 1951. The two teams have met 86 times on the football field, with Butler currently holding a 56–30 edge in the all-time series. In 2006, at the suggestion of Butler head coach Jeff Voris, the Hoosier Helmet Trophy was created to commemorate and intensify the long-standing rivalry between the two schools.

The trophy is a white football helmet with Butler's logo on one side, and Valparaiso's logo on the other; mounted on a hardwood plaque. An inscription is added to the base each year with the winner and the score of each game. Since the trophy was established in 2006, Butler leads in the trophy series, 15–7.

== Game results ==
Butler victories	Valparaiso victories

No.	Date	Location	Winner	Score
1	October 1, 1927	Indianapolis, IN	Butler	58–0
2	November 4, 1933	Indianapolis, IN	Valparaiso	20–7
3	November 17, 1934	Indianapolis, IN	Butler	12–7
4	October 25, 1935	Indianapolis, IN	Butler	39–0
5	November 7, 1936	Indianapolis, IN	Butler	41–0
6	October 9, 1937	Indianapolis, IN	Butler	33–0
7	November 10, 1945	Indianapolis, IN	Valparaiso	6–0
8	November 16, 1946	Indianapolis, IN	Butler	25–0
9	November 15, 1947	Valparaiso, IN	Butler	27–6
10	September 22, 1951	Indianapolis, IN	Valparaiso	41–7
11	November 1, 1952	Valparaiso, IN	Valparaiso	14–13
12	October 31, 1953	Indianapolis, IN	Butler	32–20
13	October 30, 1954	Michigan City, IN	Valparaiso	39–7
14	October 29, 1955	Indianapolis, IN	Valparaiso	24–14
15	November 3, 1956	Valparaiso, IN	Butler	20–6
16	October 19, 1957	Valparaiso, IN	Butler	27–0
17	October 18, 1958	Indianapolis, IN	Butler	34–0
18	October 17, 1959	Valparaiso, IN	Butler	10–7
19	October 15, 1960	Indianapolis, IN	Butler	27–20
20	November 4, 1961	Indianapolis, IN	Butler	14–2
21	November 3, 1962	Valparaiso, IN	Butler	16–14
22	November 2, 1963	Indianapolis, IN	Butler	20–12
23	October 31, 1964	Valparaiso, IN	Valparaiso	23–14
24	October 9, 1965	Valparaiso, IN	Valparaiso	23–21
25	October 8, 1966	Indianapolis, IN	Valparaiso	15–12
26	October 7, 1967	Valparaiso, IN	Valparaiso	21–7
27	October 12, 1968	Indianapolis, IN	Valparaiso	10–7
28	November 8, 1969	Indianapolis, IN	Butler	38–20
29	November 7, 1970	Valparaiso, IN	Butler	34–31
30	November 6, 1971	Indianapolis, IN	Valparaiso	48–12
31	November 4, 1972	Valparaiso, IN	Butler	17–10
32	October 13, 1973	Indianapolis, IN	Butler	12–6
33	September 28, 1974	Valparaiso, IN	Butler	31–15
34	October 11, 1975	Indianapolis, IN	Butler	38–9
35	October 2, 1976	Valparaiso, IN	Valparaiso	49–29
36	October 1, 1977	Indianapolis, IN	Butler	14–7
37	September 30, 1978	Valparaiso, IN	Butler	24–20
38	September 29, 1979	Indianapolis, IN	Butler	25–22
39	September 27, 1980	Valparaiso, IN	Valparaiso	25–13
40	October 3, 1981	Indianapolis, IN	Butler	16–0
41	October 2, 1982	Valparaiso, IN	Butler	27–3
42	October 1, 1983	Indianapolis, IN	Butler	41–35
43	November 3, 1984	Indianapolis, IN	Butler	28–27
44	November 2, 1985	Valparaiso, IN	Butler	26–15

No.	Date	Location	Winner	Score
45	November 1, 1986	Indianapolis, IN	Butler	28–6
46	November 7, 1987	Valparaiso, IN	Butler	29–22
47	October 15, 1988	Valparaiso, IN	Butler	56–0
48	October 14, 1989	Indianapolis, IN	Butler	31–0
49	October 13, 1990	Indianapolis, IN	Butler	37–0
50	October 19, 1991	Valparaiso, IN	Butler	22–2
51	October 17, 1992	Indianapolis, IN	Butler	42–13
52	October 9, 1993	Indianapolis, IN	Butler	10–0
53	October 8, 1994	Valparaiso, IN	Valparaiso	20–14
54	October 7, 1995	Indianapolis, IN	Valparaiso	44–42
55	October 12, 1996	Valparaiso, IN	Valparaiso	50–29
56	October 18, 1997	Indianapolis, IN	Valparaiso	19–17
57	October 17, 1998	Valparaiso, IN	Valparaiso	17–10
58	October 9, 1999	Indianapolis, IN	Valparaiso	38–20
59	October 14, 2000	Valparaiso, IN	Valparaiso	33–7
60	October 6, 2001	Indianapolis, IN	Butler	38–21
61	November 2, 2002	Valparaiso, IN	Butler	52–22
62	November 8, 2003	Indianapolis, IN	Butler	25–21
63	November 6, 2004	Valparaiso, IN	Valparaiso	31–26
64	October 15, 2005	Indianapolis, IN	Valparaiso	34–21
65	October 21, 2006	Indianapolis, IN	Butler	32–10
66	October 13, 2007	Valparaiso, IN	Valparaiso	42–37
67	October 18, 2008	Valparaiso, IN	Butler	48–21
68	October 17, 2009	Indianapolis, IN	Butler	23–14
69	October 30, 2010	Valparaiso, IN	Butler	48–0
70	October 15, 2011	Indianapolis, IN	Butler	42–14
71	October 6, 2012	Valparaiso, IN	Butler	56–17
72	November 9, 2013	Indianapolis, IN	Butler	72–12
73	November 8, 2014	Valparaiso, IN	Valparaiso	17–3
74	November 7, 2015	Indianapolis, IN	Butler	42–21
75	October 29, 2016	Valparaiso, IN	Butler	23–12
76	November 11, 2017	Indianapolis, IN	Valparaiso	36–28
77	October 13, 2018	Valparaiso, IN	Valparaiso	35–17
78	November 16, 2019	Indianapolis, IN	Butler	24–21
79	March 13, 2021	Indianapolis, IN	Valparaiso	24–14
80	March 27, 2021	Valparaiso, IN	Valparaiso	28–25
81	November 13, 2021	Indianapolis, IN	Valparaiso	47–3
82	October 15, 2022	Valparaiso, IN	Butler	26–25
83	October 28, 2023	Indianapolis, IN	Butler	17–7
84	November 9, 2024	Valparaiso, IN	Butler	24–17
85	November 22, 2025	Indianapolis, IN	Butler	27–20
86	September 26, 2026	Valparaiso, IN	Butler	33–28
Series: Butler leads 56–30

== See also ==
- List of NCAA college football rivalry games
