= Butler Bulldogs football =

American football team of Butler University

2026 Butler Bulldogs football team
- First season: 1884; 142 years ago
- Athletic director: Grant Leiendecker
- Head coach: Kevin Lynch; 2nd season, 16–8 (.667)
- Location: Indianapolis, Indiana
- Stadium: Bud and Jackie Sellick Bowl (capacity: 7,500)
- NCAA division: Division I FCS
- Conference: Pioneer Football League
- Colors: Blue and white
- All-time record: 634–511–35 (.552)
- Bowl record: 1–3 (.250)

Conference championships
- ICC: 1952, 1953, 1958, 1959, 1960, 1961, 1962, 1963, 1964, 1972, 1973, 1974, 1975 HCC: 1977, 1983, 1985, 1987, 1988, 1989 MIFC: 1991, 1992 PFL: 1994, 2009, 2012, 2013, 2026
- Consensus All-Americans: 17
- Rivalries: Valparaiso (rivalry)

Uniforms
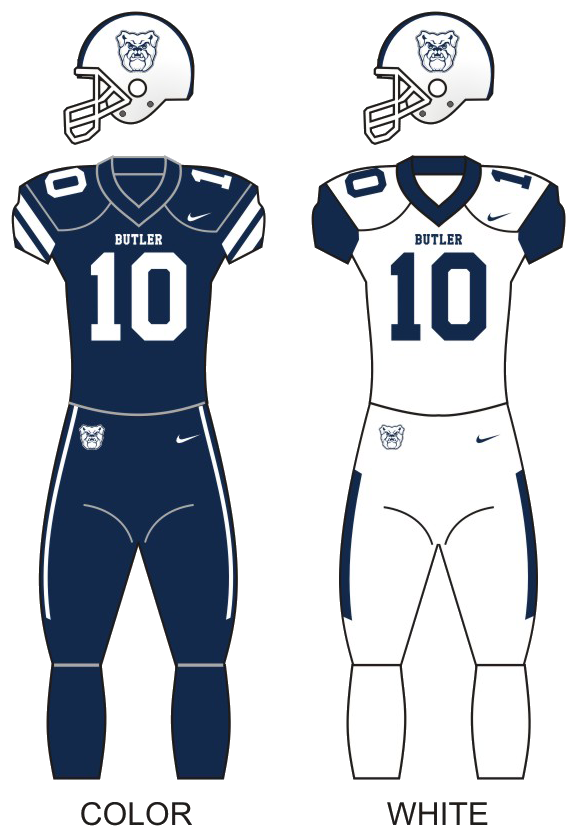
- Fight song: The Butler War Song
- Mascot: Butler Blue IV
- Website: butlersports.com

The Butler Bulldogs football program is the intercollegiate American football team for Butler University located in the U.S. state of Indiana. The team competes in the NCAA Division I Football Championship Subdivision (FCS) and is a member of the Pioneer Football League (PFL). Butler's first football team was fielded in 1887. The team plays its home games at the 7,500 seat Bud and Jackie Sellick Bowl (historically Butler Bowl) in Indianapolis. The Bulldogs are coached by Kevin Lynch.

== History ==
=== Classifications ===
- 1962–1972: NCAA College Division
- 1973–1992: NCAA Division II
- 1993–present: NCAA Division I–AA/FCS

=== Conference memberships ===
- 1884–1913: Independent
- 1914–1922: Indiana College Athletic League
- 1923–1931: Indiana Intercollegiate Conference
- 1932–1933: Missouri Valley Conference
- 1934–1947: Indiana Intercollegiate Conference
- 1948–1949: Mid-American Conference
- 1950-1977: Indiana Collegiate Conference
- 1978-1989: Heartland Collegiate Conference
- 1990–1992: Midwest Intercollegiate Football Conference
- 1993–present: Pioneer Football League

== Notable former players ==
Notable alumni include:

- Bill Lynch
- Arnold Mickens
- Chris Salvi
- Joseph "The Gentle Giant" Holzmer
- David "Mr. Automatic" Lang

== Championships ==
=== Football Conference championships ===
Year	Conference	Coach	Overall Record	Conference Record
1952	Indiana Collegiate Conference (co-championship)	Tony Hinkle	5–3–1	3–1–1
1953	Indiana Collegiate Conference	Tony Hinkle	6–2	5–0
1958	Indiana Collegiate Conference	Tony Hinkle	8–1	5–1
1959	Indiana Collegiate Conference	Tony Hinkle	9–0	6–0
1960	Indiana Collegiate Conference	Tony Hinkle	8–1	5–1
1961	Indiana Collegiate Conference	Tony Hinkle	9–0	6–0
1962	Indiana Collegiate Conference	Tony Hinkle	5–2–2	4–1–1
1963	Indiana Collegiate Conference	Tony Hinkle	8–1	6–0
1964	Indiana Collegiate Conference (co-championship)	Tony Hinkle	4–4–1	4–2
1972	Indiana Collegiate Conference (co-championship)	Bill Sylvester	5–5	4–1
1973	Indiana Collegiate Conference	Bill Sylvester	5–5	4–1
1974	Indiana Collegiate Conference	Bill Sylvester	8–2	6–0
1975	Indiana Collegiate Conference	Bill Sylvester	9–1	6–0
1977	Heartland Collegiate Conference (co-championship)	Bill Sylvester	5–5	3–1
1983	Heartland Collegiate Conference	Bill Sylvester	9–1–1	5–0–1
1985	Heartland Collegiate Conference (co-championship)	Bill Lynch	8–2	5–1
1987	Heartland Collegiate Conference	Bill Lynch	8–1–1	4–0–1
1988	Heartland Collegiate Conference	Bill Lynch	8–2–1	3–0–1
1989	Heartland Collegiate Conference	Bill Lynch	7–2–1	4–0
1991	Midwest Intercollegiate Football Conference	Bob Bartolomeo	9–2	9–1
1992	Midwest Intercollegiate Football Conference (co-championship)	Ken LaRose	8–2	8–2
1994	Pioneer Football League (co-championship)	Ken LaRose	7–3	4–1
2009	Pioneer Football League (co-championship)	Jeff Voris	11–1	7–1
2012	Pioneer Football League (co-championship)	Jeff Voris	8–3	7–1
2013	Pioneer Football League (co-championship)	Jeff Voris	9–4	7–1
2026	Pioneer Football League (co-championship)	Kevin Lynch	10–2	7–1
Total conference championships (modern era)			26	

== Playoff appearances ==
=== NCAA Division I-AA/FCS playoffs ===
The Bulldogs have appeared in the FCS playoffs once, with an overall record of 0–1.

Year	Round	Opponent	Result
2013	First Round	Tennessee State	L, 0–31

=== NCAA Division II playoffs ===
The Bulldogs made three appearances in the Division II playoffs, with a combined record of 0–3.

Year	Round	Opponent	Result
1983	Quarterfinals	UC Davis	L, 6–25
1988	First Round	Tennessee–Martin	L, 6–23
1991	First Round	Pittsburg State	L, 16–26

=== PFL Gridiron Classic results ===
From 2006 through 2009, the PFL and Northeast Conference (NEC) staged the Gridiron Classic, an exempted postseason football game that matched the champions of the two conferences which were technically members of Division I FCS, but which were not the recipients of automatic invitations to the football championship playoff at the time. The Bulldogs appeared in the PFL Gridiron Classic once, with an overall record of 1–0.

Year	Opponent	Result
2009	Central Connecticut	W, 28–23

== Future non-conference opponents ==
Announced schedules as of July 13, 2026.

2026	2027	2028
Georgetown (KY)	at Northern Iowa	at Austin Peay
at Montana State		
Franklin College (IN)		
Chicago State		
