= Bud and Jackie Sellick Bowl =

Multi-purpose stadium on the Butler University campus in Indianapolis, IN, US

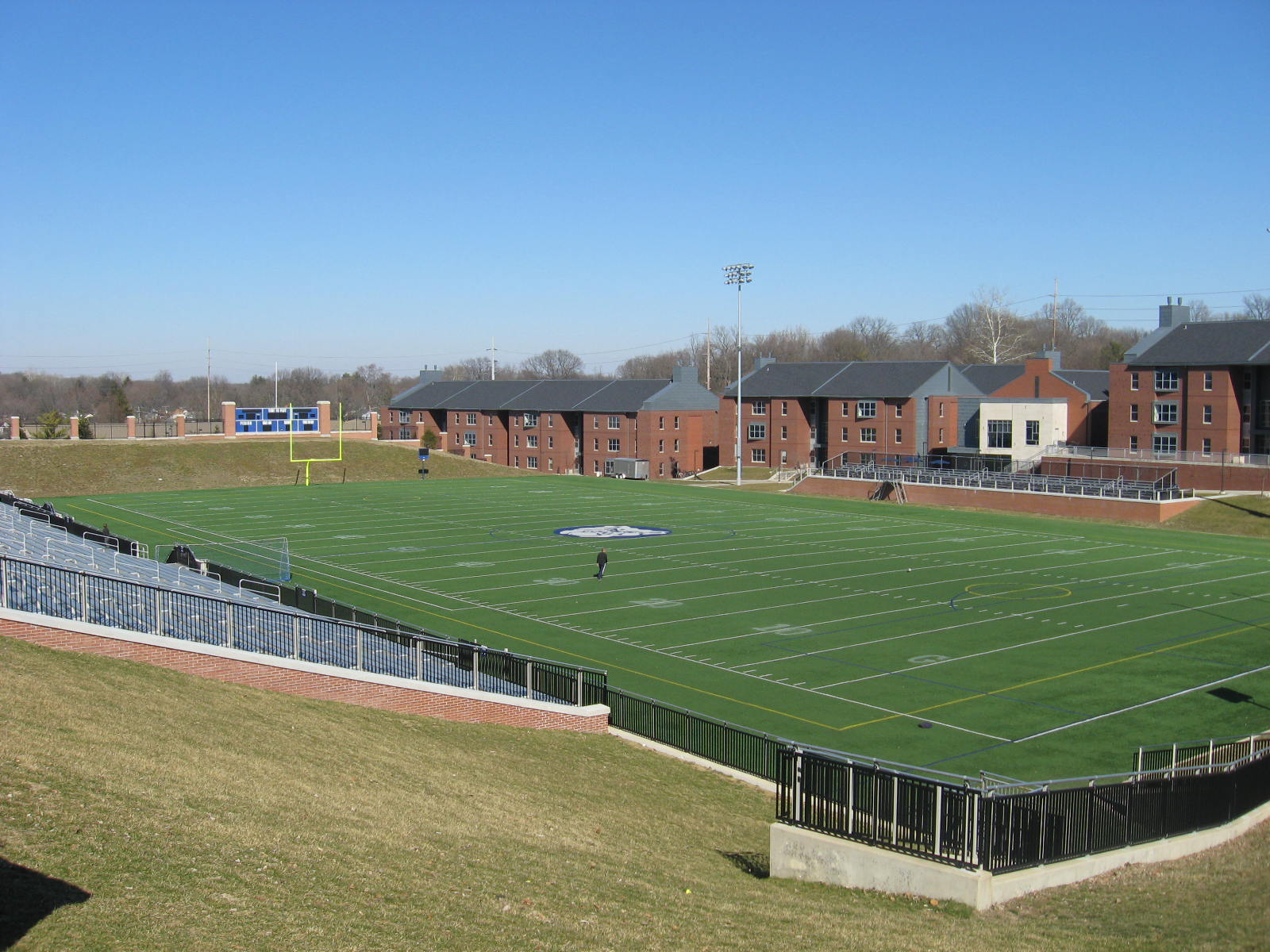
- View of the stadium in 2012
- Interactive map of Bud and Jackie Sellick Bowl
- Location: Sunset Ave & W. 46th St., Indianapolis, Indiana, United States
- Coordinates: 39°50′40″N 86°9′57″W
- Owner: Butler University
- Operator: Butler University
- Capacity: 5,647 (seated); 7,500 (approximate with standing room)
- Surface: FieldTurf (installed in 2006)

Construction
- Opened: 1928; 98 years ago

Tenants
- Butler Bulldogs (NCAA; 1928–present); Indianapolis Daredevils (ASL; 1978–1979)

Website
- butlersports.com/stadium}

Bud and Jackie Sellick Bowl is a multi-purpose stadium in Indianapolis, Indiana, United States. It opened in 1928 and is home to the Butler University Bulldogs football and soccer teams. The original seating was 36,000.

== History ==
In 1955, the seating was reduced to 20,000 with the addition of the Hilton U. Brown Theater, and later renovations dropped seating capacity to below 6,000.

Renovations to the stadium and its landscape have included removal of the Hilton U. Brown Theater in 2004, widening of the sidelines and installation of a synthetic turf playing surface in fall 2005, and the addition of the Apartment Village on the east side of the complex in 2006. A new press box and new seating on the west and east ends of the stadium were completed by 2010, with the student hill at the south end of the Bowl. New lighting was installed by 2011, and new south end seating and the new entrance was scheduled to be completed by 2013. The additional south end seating will bring the seating capacity back up to approximately 7,500. Construction completed on the 2010 phase of the renovation includes the building of a brick press box with multi-use booths and new seating on the west and east sides of the playing surface. The renovation of the facility increased the seating capacity to 5,647 with the addition of new bleacher seats along the west side of the field and a section of seating for visiting fans on the east side. The brick press box is approximately 40 yards long, reaching between the field's two 30-yard lines. The main level has home and visitor radio booths along with private booths for home and visiting coaches. Also, there is an expanded area for game operations and the top-level houses a video booth and an observation deck.

On September 8, 2012, the stadium held its first night football game in over 70 years. The Bulldogs defeated Franklin, 42–14, before a crowd of 4,148.

In 2017, after having been known as the Butler Bowl since its completion, the stadium was renamed the Bud and Jackie Sellick Bowl.

== Gallery ==
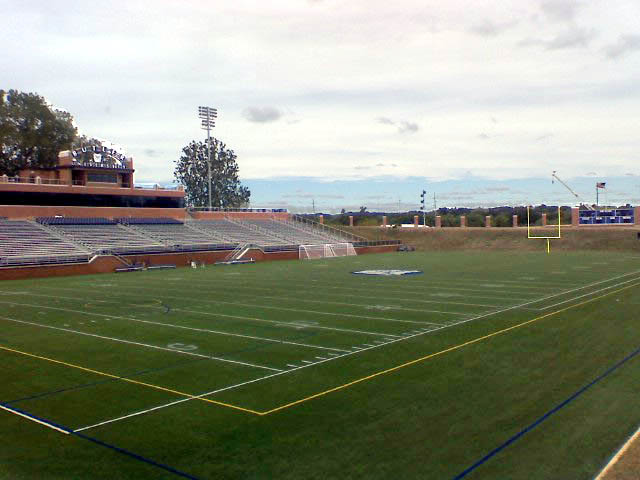
Game field, 2011

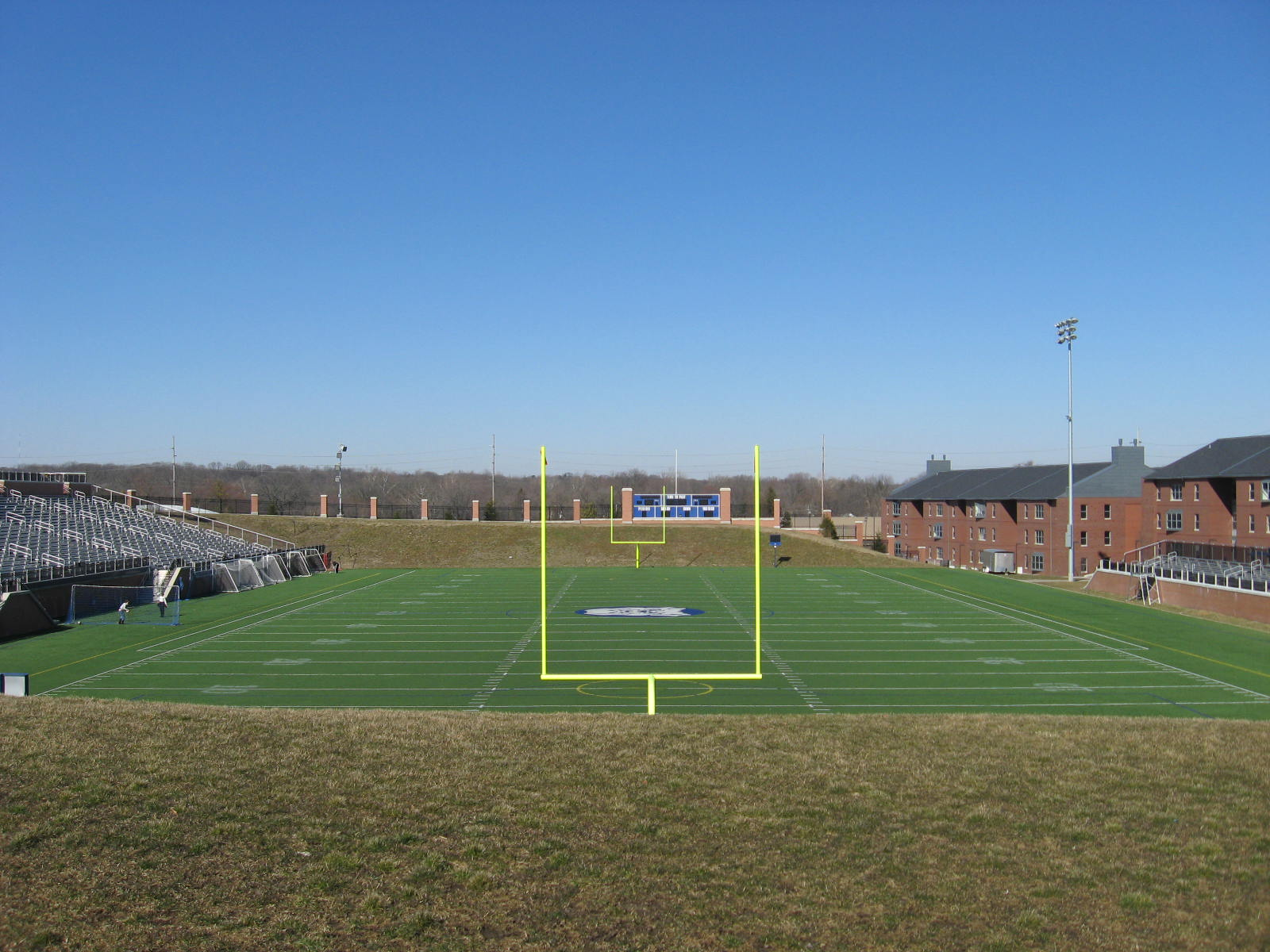
Endzone, 2012

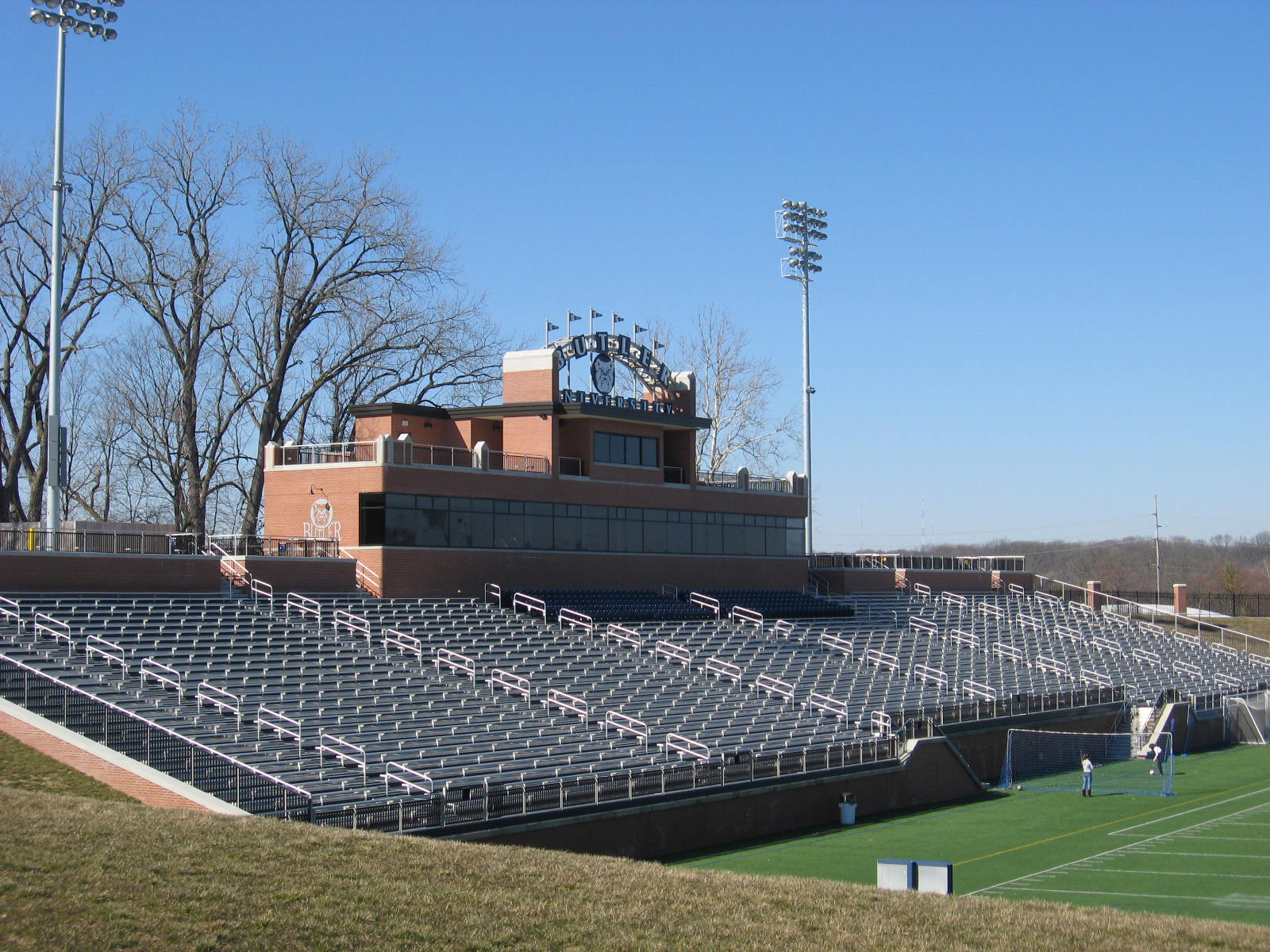
Grandstand and boxes, 2012

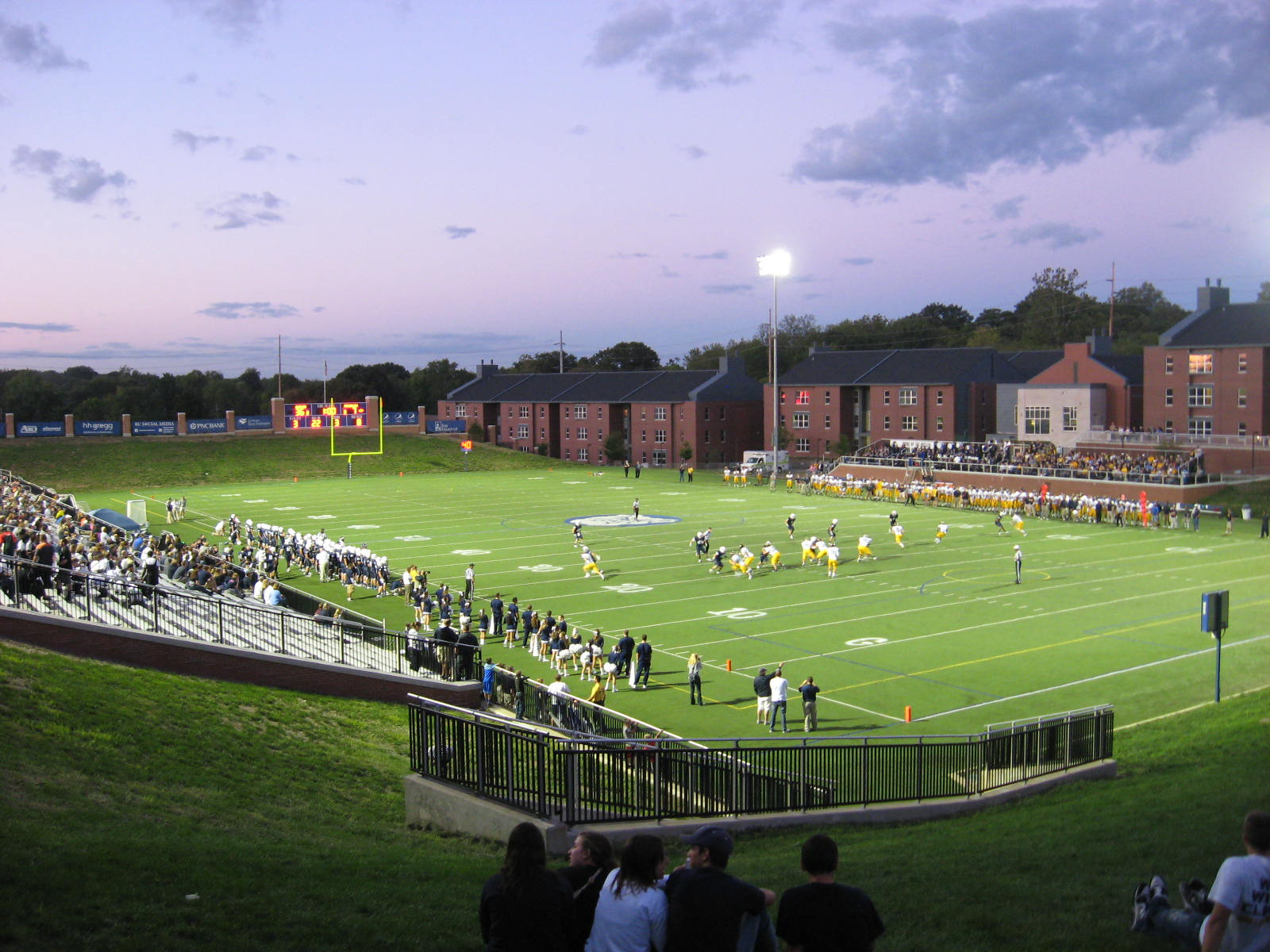
2012 night game

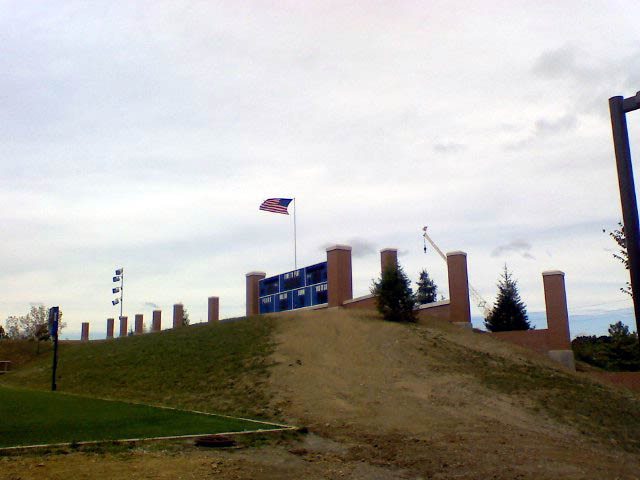
Scoreboard

== See also ==
- List of NCAA Division I FCS football stadiums
