= 1961 Notre Dame Fighting Irish football team =

American college football season

1961 Notre Dame Fighting Irish football
- Conference: Independent
- Record: 5–5
- Head coach: Joe Kuharich (3rd season)
- Captains: Nick Buoniconti; Norb Roy
- Home stadium: Notre Dame Stadium

1961 Midwestern college football independents records
	Conf.			Overall
Team	W	L	T	W		L		T
Baldwin–Wallace		–		9	–	0	–	0
Wheaton (IL)		–		8	–	0	–	0
Earlham		–		7	–	1	–	0
St. Norbert		–		7	–	2	–	0
Northern Michigan		–		6	–	2	–	0
Hillsdale		–		6	–	3	–	0
Ferris Institute		–		5	–	3	–	0
Bradley		–		6	–	4	–	0
Xavier		–		6	–	4	–	0
Eureka		–		3	–	2	–	1
Detroit		–		5	–	4	–	0
Drake		–		5	–	4	–	0
Wabash		–		5	–	4	–	0
Youngstown		–		4	–	4	–	1
Notre Dame		–		5	–	5	–	0
Concordia (IL)		–		4	–	4	–	0
St. Mary of the Plains		–		4	–	5	–	0
North Park		–		3	–	5	–	0
William Penn		–		3	–	5	–	1
St. Procopius		–		2	–	4	–	0
Dayton		–		2	–	8	–	0
Elmhurst		–		1	–	6	–	1
Rose Poly		–		0	–	8	–	0
Washington University		–		0	–	9	–	0

The 1961 Notre Dame Fighting Irish football team was an American football team that represented the University of Notre Dame as an independent during the 1961 college football season. In their third year under head coach Joe Kuharich, the Fighting Irish compiled a 5–5 record and were outscored by a total of 182 to 175. They won their first three games over Oklahoma, Purdue, and USC, and were ranked No. 6 in the AP poll. They then lost consecutive games to No. 1 Michigan State, Northwestern, and Navy, falling out of the rankings.

Co-captain and guard/linebacker Nick Buoniconti led the team with 74 tackles, blocked two kicks, and was the only Notre Dame player to win 1961 All-American honors. Halfback Angelo Dabiero led the team in rushing (657 yards), punt returns, and interceptions, and ranked second in pass receiving (10 receptions for 201 yards) and scoring (18 points).

The team played its home games at Notre Dame Stadium in Notre Dame, Indiana.

== Schedule ==
Date	Opponent	Rank	Site	Result	Attendance	Source
September 30	Oklahoma		Notre Dame Stadium; Notre Dame, IN	W 19–6	55,198	
October 7	at Purdue		Ross–Ade Stadium; West Lafayette, IN (rivalry)	W 22–20	51,295	
October 14	USC	No. 8	Notre Dame Stadium; Notre Dame, IN (rivalry)	W 30–0	50,427	
October 21	at No. 1 Michigan State	No. 6	Spartan Stadium; East Lansing, MI (rivalry)	L 7–17	76,132	
October 28	Northwestern	No. 8	Notre Dame Stadium; Notre Dame, IN (rivalry)	L 10–12	59,075	
November 4	Navy		Notre Dame Stadium; Notre Dame, IN (rivalry)	L 10–13	59,075	
November 11	at Pittsburgh		Pitt Stadium; Pittsburgh, PA (rivalry)	W 26–20	50,527	
November 18	No. 10 Syracuse		Notre Dame Stadium; Notre Dame, IN	W 17–15	49,246	
November 25	at Iowa		Iowa Stadium; Iowa City, IA	L 21–42	58,000	
December 2	at Duke		Duke Stadium; Durham, NC	L 13–37	35,000	
Rankings from AP Poll released prior to the game

== Statistics and awards ==
The team outgained its opponents in rushing yards by 2,245 (224.5 per game) to 1,282 (128.2 per game). In passing yards, the Irish were outgained by 1,591 (159.1 per game) to 961 (96.1 per game).

Guard/linebacker and team co-captain Nick Buoniconti was the team's leader on defense with 74 tackles, including 13 unassisted tackles against Michigan State. He also blocked two kicks. Buoniconti was the only Notre Dame player to receive 1961 All-America honors, having been named to the first team by the Central Press and the second team by the United Press International and The Sporting News. He was later inducted into the Pro Football Hall of Fame.

Senior halfback Angelo Dabiero was the team leader in multiple statistical categories. He led the team in rushing with 637 yards on 92 carries for an average gain of 6.9 yards per attempt. He ranked second in pass receiving (10 receptions for 201 yards), first in punt returns (11 returns, 97 yards, 8.8-yard average), second in kickoff returns (eight returns, 203 yards), and tied for second in scoring (24 points). Dabiero also played on defense, leading the team with five interceptions and ranking third in tackles (47).

Sophomore quarterback Frank Budka completed 40 of 95 passes (42.1%) for 636 yards, three touchdowns, and 14 interceptions. Budka also played on defense, tallying 21 tackles, three pass breakups, three opponent fumbles recovered, and two passes intercepted.

Quarterback Daryle Lamonica completed 20 of 52 passes (38.5%) for 300 yards with two touchdowns and four interceptions. Lamonica was also the team's leading punter, kicking 29 times for 1,113 yards, an average of 38.4 yards per punt. Lamonica also played on defense, tallying 29 tackles, five pass breakups, and three interceptions.

Senior end Les Traver was the team's leading receiver with 17 receptions for 349 yards and two touchdowns. Traver also tallied 35 tackles and an interception while playing on defense.

Fullback Joe Perkowski was the team's leading scorer with 31 points on five field goals and 16 points after touchdown. Following a penalty for roughing the holder, he kicked a game-winning field goal against Syracuse after time had expired.

Other notable contributors included tackle Bob Bill (second in tackles with 50) and fullback Mike Lind (second in rushing with 450 yards).

== Personnel ==
=== Players ===
- Bob Bill, tackle
- Brian Boulac, end
- Frank Budka, quarterback, sophomore
- Ed Burke, guard
- Nick Buoniconti, guard/linebacker
- Joe Carollo, tackle
- Paul Costa, halfback
- Angelo Dabiero, halfback
- Tom Goberville, end
- Frank Grau, guard
- Gerry Gray, fullback
- Tom Hecomovich, center
- Ed Hoerster, center
- Jim Kelly, end
- Daryle Lamonica, quarterback
- Bob Lehmann, guard
- Mike Lind, fullback
- Frank Minik, halfback
- Dennis Murphy, end
- Dick Naab, fullback
- Charlie O'Hara, halfback
- Martin Olosky, tackle
- Joe Perkowski, halfback
- Pfeiffer, quarterback
- John Powers, end
- Norb Rascher
- Norm Roy, guard
- Ed Rutkowski, halfback
- Clay Schulz, center
- George Sefcik, halfback
- Jack Simon, end
- Jim Snowden, fullback
- Stephens, end
- Les Traver, end
- Gene Viola, center
- Roger Wilke, tackle
- George Williams, tackle

== 1962 NFL draft ==
Player	Position	Round	NFL club
Joe Carollo	Tackle	2	Los Angeles Rams
Bob Bill	Tackle	2	New York Giants
Mike Lind	Fullback	5	San Francisco 49ers
John Powers	End	9	Pittsburgh Steelers
Joe Perkowski	Halfback, kicker	13	Chicago Bears
