= 1961 St. Norbert Green Knights football team =

American college football season

1961 St. Norbert Green Knights football
- Conference: Independent
- Record: 7–2
- Head coach: Howard Kolstad (2nd season)
- Home stadium: Minahan Stadium

1961 Midwestern college football independents records
	Conf.			Overall
Team	W	L	T	W		L		T
Baldwin–Wallace		–		9	–	0	–	0
Wheaton (IL)		–		8	–	0	–	0
Earlham		–		7	–	1	–	0
St. Norbert		–		7	–	2	–	0
Northern Michigan		–		6	–	2	–	0
Hillsdale		–		6	–	3	–	0
Ferris Institute		–		5	–	3	–	0
Bradley		–		6	–	4	–	0
Xavier		–		6	–	4	–	0
Eureka		–		3	–	2	–	1
Detroit		–		5	–	4	–	0
Drake		–		5	–	4	–	0
Wabash		–		5	–	4	–	0
Youngstown		–		4	–	4	–	1
Notre Dame		–		5	–	5	–	0
Concordia (IL)		–		4	–	4	–	0
St. Mary of the Plains		–		4	–	5	–	0
North Park		–		3	–	5	–	0
William Penn		–		3	–	5	–	1
St. Procopius		–		2	–	4	–	0
Dayton		–		2	–	8	–	0
Elmhurst		–		1	–	6	–	1
Rose Poly		–		0	–	8	–	0
Washington University		–		0	–	9	–	0

The 1961 St. Norbert Green Knights football team was an American football team that represented St. Norbert College of De Pere, Wisconsin, as an independent during the 1961 college football season. In their second year under head coach Howard Kolstad, the Green Knights compiled a 7–2 record.

== Schedule ==
Date	Opponent	Site	Result	Attendance	Source
September 9	St. Thomas (MN)	Minahan Stadium; De Pere, WI	W 21–6	2,500	
September 16	La Crosse State	West De Pere, WI	W 14–3	2,800	
September 23	at Michigan Tech	Houghton, MI	W 7–6	1,929	
September 30	Ferris Institute	Minahan Stadium; De Pere, WI	W 35–7	1,800	
October 7	vs. Lakeland	Plymouth, WI	W 25–0	300	
October 14	Northern Michigan	Minahan Stadium; De Pere, WI	L 7–36	4,000	
October 21	at Northland	Ashland High School field; Ashland, WI	W 41–14		
October 28	at Luther	Decorah, IA	W 14–0	1,400	
November 4	at Whitewater State	Whitewater, WI	L 7–12		
