= 1961 Detroit Titans football team =

American college football season

1961 Detroit Titans football
- Conference: Independent
- Record: 5–4
- Head coach: Jim Miller (3rd season)
- Home stadium: University of Detroit Stadium

1961 Midwestern college football independents records
	Conf.			Overall
Team	W	L	T	W		L		T
Baldwin–Wallace		–		9	–	0	–	0
Wheaton (IL)		–		8	–	0	–	0
Earlham		–		7	–	1	–	0
St. Norbert		–		7	–	2	–	0
Northern Michigan		–		6	–	2	–	0
Hillsdale		–		6	–	3	–	0
Ferris Institute		–		5	–	3	–	0
Bradley		–		6	–	4	–	0
Xavier		–		6	–	4	–	0
Eureka		–		3	–	2	–	1
Detroit		–		5	–	4	–	0
Drake		–		5	–	4	–	0
Wabash		–		5	–	4	–	0
Youngstown		–		4	–	4	–	1
Notre Dame		–		5	–	5	–	0
Concordia (IL)		–		4	–	4	–	0
St. Mary of the Plains		–		4	–	5	–	0
North Park		–		3	–	5	–	0
William Penn		–		3	–	5	–	1
St. Procopius		–		2	–	4	–	0
Dayton		–		2	–	8	–	0
Elmhurst		–		1	–	6	–	1
Rose Poly		–		0	–	8	–	0
Washington University		–		0	–	9	–	0

The 1961 Detroit Titans football team represented the University of Detroit as an independent during the 1961 college football season. In their third and final year under head coach Jim Miller, the Titans compiled a 5–6 record and were outscored by a combined total of 181 to 173.

The team's statistical leaders included Jerry Gross with 1,126 passing yards, Vic Battani with 358 rushing yards, and Larry Vargo with 601 receiving yards and 48 points scored.

== Schedule ==
Date	Opponent	Site	Result	Attendance	Source
September 22	Western Michigan	University of Detroit Stadium; Detroit, MI	W 21–14	18,000–18,603	
September 29	Xavier	University of Detroit Stadium; Detroit, MI	W 34–8	15,750	
October 13	Boston College	University of Detroit Stadium; Detroit, MI	W 20–3	15,260	
October 20	Navy	University of Detroit Stadium; Detroit, MI	L 19–37	31,279	
October 28	at Dayton	Baujan Field; Dayton, OH	W 41–12		
November 4	at Army	Michie Stadium; West Point, NY	L 7–34	15,525	
November 10	Villanova	University of Detroit Stadium; Detroit, MI	W 20–6	15,790	
November 18	at Arizona State	Sun Devil Stadium; Tempe, AZ	L 6–40	23,508	
November 25	at Cincinnati	Nippert Stadium; Cincinnati, OH	L 13–19	7,500	

== See also ==
- 1961 in Michigan
