= 1961 Drake Bulldogs football team =

American college football season

1961 Drake Bulldogs football
- Conference: Independent
- Record: 5–4
- Head coach: Bus Mertes (2nd season)
- Home stadium: Drake Stadium

1961 Midwestern college football independents records
	Conf.			Overall
Team	W	L	T	W		L		T
Baldwin–Wallace		–		9	–	0	–	0
Wheaton (IL)		–		8	–	0	–	0
Earlham		–		7	–	1	–	0
St. Norbert		–		7	–	2	–	0
Northern Michigan		–		6	–	2	–	0
Hillsdale		–		6	–	3	–	0
Ferris Institute		–		5	–	3	–	0
Bradley		–		6	–	4	–	0
Xavier		–		6	–	4	–	0
Eureka		–		3	–	2	–	1
Detroit		–		5	–	4	–	0
Drake		–		5	–	4	–	0
Wabash		–		5	–	4	–	0
Youngstown		–		4	–	4	–	1
Notre Dame		–		5	–	5	–	0
Concordia (IL)		–		4	–	4	–	0
St. Mary of the Plains		–		4	–	5	–	0
North Park		–		3	–	5	–	0
William Penn		–		3	–	5	–	1
St. Procopius		–		2	–	4	–	0
Dayton		–		2	–	8	–	0
Elmhurst		–		1	–	6	–	1
Rose Poly		–		0	–	8	–	0
Washington University		–		0	–	9	–	0

The 1961 Drake Bulldogs football team was an American football team that represented Drake University as an independent during the 1961 college football season. In its second season under head coach Bus Mertes, the team compiled a 5–4 record and was outscored by a total of 106 to 102. The team played its home games at Drake Stadium in Des Moines, Iowa.

== Schedule ==
Date	Opponent	Site	Result	Attendance	Source
September 16	Iowa State	Drake Stadium; Des Moines, IA	L 0–21	12,465	
September 23	at Southern Illinois	McAndrew Stadium; Carbondale, IL	W 7–0	10,000	
September 30	at Colorado State–Greeley	Jackson Field; Greeley, CO	W 7–0	4,000–4,500	
October 7	State College of Iowa	Drake Stadium; Des Moines, IA	W 21–6	5,000	
October 14	Idaho State	Drake Stadium; Des Moines, IA	L 11–12	5,000	
October 28	Bradley^{†}	Drake Stadium; Des Moines, IA	W 24–13	5,500–7,000	
November 4	at North Texas	Fouts Field; Denton, TX	L 21–28	5,00	
November 11	at Wichita	Veterans Field; Wichita, KS	L 13–26	9,130	
November 18	at Omaha	Omaha, NE	W 36–13	1,800–2,400	
^{†}Homecoming
