= 1961 Wabash Little Giants football team =

American college football season

1961 Wabash Little Giants football
- Conference: Independent
- Record: 5–4
- Head coach: Kenneth W. Keuffel (1st season)
- Home stadium: Ingalls Field

1961 Midwestern college football independents records
	Conf.			Overall
Team	W	L	T	W		L		T
Baldwin–Wallace		–		9	–	0	–	0
Wheaton (IL)		–		8	–	0	–	0
Earlham		–		7	–	1	–	0
St. Norbert		–		7	–	2	–	0
Northern Michigan		–		6	–	2	–	0
Hillsdale		–		6	–	3	–	0
Ferris Institute		–		5	–	3	–	0
Bradley		–		6	–	4	–	0
Xavier		–		6	–	4	–	0
Eureka		–		3	–	2	–	1
Detroit		–		5	–	4	–	0
Drake		–		5	–	4	–	0
Wabash		–		5	–	4	–	0
Youngstown		–		4	–	4	–	1
Notre Dame		–		5	–	5	–	0
Concordia (IL)		–		4	–	4	–	0
St. Mary of the Plains		–		4	–	5	–	0
North Park		–		3	–	5	–	0
William Penn		–		3	–	5	–	1
St. Procopius		–		2	–	4	–	0
Dayton		–		2	–	8	–	0
Elmhurst		–		1	–	6	–	1
Rose Poly		–		0	–	8	–	0
Washington University		–		0	–	9	–	0

The 1961 Wabash Little Giants football team was an American football team that represented Wabash College of Crawfordsville, Indiana, as an independent during the 1961 college football season. In their first year under head coach Kenneth W. Keuffel, the Little Giants compiled a 5–4 record.

== Schedule ==
Date	Opponent	Site	Result	Attendance	Source
September 23	Evansville	Ingalls Field; Crawfordsville, IN	W 12–7		
September 30	at Washington University	St. Louis, MO	W 19–14		
October 7	Butler	Ingalls Field; Crawfordsville, IN (Iron Key)	L 7–34	2,150	
October 14	Hanover	Ingalls Field; Crawfordsville, IN	W 35–13	3,000	
October 21	at Bradley	Bradley Stadium; Peoria, IL	L 10–21		
October 28	at Ohio Wesleyan	Delaware, OH	L 7–13		
November 4	John Carroll	Ingalls Field; Crawfordsville, IN	W 7–6		
November 11	at Heidelberg	Tiffin, OH	W 21–6	2,500	
November 18	at DePauw	Greencastle, IN (Monon Bell)	L 7–20		
