= 1961 Eureka Red Devils football team =

American college football season

1961 Eureka Red Devils football
- Conference: Independent
- Record: 3–2–1
- Head coach: Leo Traister (6th season)

1961 Midwestern college football independents records
	Conf.			Overall
Team	W	L	T	W		L		T
Baldwin–Wallace		–		9	–	0	–	0
Wheaton (IL)		–		8	–	0	–	0
Earlham		–		7	–	1	–	0
St. Norbert		–		7	–	2	–	0
Northern Michigan		–		6	–	2	–	0
Hillsdale		–		6	–	3	–	0
Ferris Institute		–		5	–	3	–	0
Bradley		–		6	–	4	–	0
Xavier		–		6	–	4	–	0
Eureka		–		3	–	2	–	1
Detroit		–		5	–	4	–	0
Drake		–		5	–	4	–	0
Wabash		–		5	–	4	–	0
Youngstown		–		4	–	4	–	1
Notre Dame		–		5	–	5	–	0
Concordia (IL)		–		4	–	4	–	0
St. Mary of the Plains		–		4	–	5	–	0
North Park		–		3	–	5	–	0
William Penn		–		3	–	5	–	1
St. Procopius		–		2	–	4	–	0
Dayton		–		2	–	8	–	0
Elmhurst		–		1	–	6	–	1
Rose Poly		–		0	–	8	–	0
Washington University		–		0	–	9	–	0

The 1961 Eureka Red Devils football team was an American football team that represented Eureka College as an independent during the 1961 college football season. In their sixth year under head coach Leo Traister, the Red Devils compiled a 3–2–1 record.

== Schedule ==
Date	Opponent	Site	Result	Source
September 23	Illinois College	Eureka HS field; Eureka, IL	T 0–0	
September 30	at St. Procopius	Lisle, IL	W 8–6	
October 7	Rose Poly	Eureka, CA	W 61–0	
October 14	at Central (MO)	Fayette, MO	L 15–42	
October 28	Chicago Illini^{†}	Eureka, IL	W 25–6	
November 4	at William Penn	Oskaloosa, IA	L 0–27	
^{†}Homecoming
