= 1961 Xavier Musketeers football team =

American college football season

1961 Xavier Musketeers football
- Conference: Independent
- Record: 6–4
- Head coach: Ed Doherty (3rd season)
- Home stadium: Xavier Stadium

1961 Midwestern college football independents records
	Conf.			Overall
Team	W	L	T	W		L		T
Baldwin–Wallace		–		9	–	0	–	0
Wheaton (IL)		–		8	–	0	–	0
Earlham		–		7	–	1	–	0
St. Norbert		–		7	–	2	–	0
Northern Michigan		–		6	–	2	–	0
Hillsdale		–		6	–	3	–	0
Ferris Institute		–		5	–	3	–	0
Bradley		–		6	–	4	–	0
Xavier		–		6	–	4	–	0
Eureka		–		3	–	2	–	1
Detroit		–		5	–	4	–	0
Drake		–		5	–	4	–	0
Wabash		–		5	–	4	–	0
Youngstown		–		4	–	4	–	1
Notre Dame		–		5	–	5	–	0
Concordia (IL)		–		4	–	4	–	0
St. Mary of the Plains		–		4	–	5	–	0
North Park		–		3	–	5	–	0
William Penn		–		3	–	5	–	1
St. Procopius		–		2	–	4	–	0
Dayton		–		2	–	8	–	0
Elmhurst		–		1	–	6	–	1
Rose Poly		–		0	–	8	–	0
Washington University		–		0	–	9	–	0

The 1961 Xavier Musketeers football team was an American football team that represented Xavier University as an independent during the 1961 college football season. In their third year under head coach Ed Doherty, the Musketeers compiled a 6–4 record.

== Schedule ==
Date	Opponent	Site	Result	Attendance	Source
September 15	Kent State	Xavier Stadium; Cincinnati, OH	W 16–8	7,120	
September 23	at Miami (OH)	Miami Field; Oxford, OH	L 0–3		
September 29	at Detroit	University of Detroit Stadium; Detroit, MI	L 8–34	15,750	
October 7	at Cincinnati	Nippert Stadium; Cincinnati, OH (rivalry)	W 17–12	25,000–28,000	
October 14	at Ohio	Peden Stadium; Athens, OH	W 6–3	14,000	
October 21	at Dayton	Baujan Field; Dayton, OH	W 14–0		
October 28	The Citadel	Xavier Stadium; Cincinnati, OH	L 6–7	9,789	
November 4	Louisville	Xavier Stadium; Cincinnati, OH	W 16–8	4,532	
November 11	Marshall	Xavier Stadium; Cincinnati, OH	W 3–2	5,103	
November 18	at Kentucky	McLean Stadium; Lexington, KY	L 0–9	25,000	
