= 1961 Dayton Flyers football team =

American college football season

1961 Dayton Flyers football
- Conference: Independent
- Record: 2–8
- Head coach: Stan Zajdel (2nd season)
- Home stadium: Baujan Field

1961 Midwestern college football independents records
	Conf.			Overall
Team	W	L	T	W		L		T
Baldwin–Wallace		–		9	–	0	–	0
Wheaton (IL)		–		8	–	0	–	0
Earlham		–		7	–	1	–	0
St. Norbert		–		7	–	2	–	0
Northern Michigan		–		6	–	2	–	0
Hillsdale		–		6	–	3	–	0
Ferris Institute		–		5	–	3	–	0
Bradley		–		6	–	4	–	0
Xavier		–		6	–	4	–	0
Eureka		–		3	–	2	–	1
Detroit		–		5	–	4	–	0
Drake		–		5	–	4	–	0
Wabash		–		5	–	4	–	0
Youngstown		–		4	–	4	–	1
Notre Dame		–		5	–	5	–	0
Concordia (IL)		–		4	–	4	–	0
St. Mary of the Plains		–		4	–	5	–	0
North Park		–		3	–	5	–	0
William Penn		–		3	–	5	–	1
St. Procopius		–		2	–	4	–	0
Dayton		–		2	–	8	–	0
Elmhurst		–		1	–	6	–	1
Rose Poly		–		0	–	8	–	0
Washington University		–		0	–	9	–	0

The 1961 Dayton Flyers football team was an American football team represented the University of Dayton as an independent during the 1961 college football season. In their second year under head coach Stan Zajdel, the Flyers compiled a 2–8 record and were outscored by a total of 245 to 98.

Quarterback Dan Laughlin led the team 530 passing yards. Junior left halfback Andy Timura led the team with 397 rushing yards, 468 receiving yards, and 30 points scored.

== Schedule ==
Date	Opponent	Site	Result	Attendance	Source
September 16	at Cincinnati	Nippert Stadium; Cincinnati, OH	L 12–16	16,000–18,000	
September 23	at Kent State	Memorial Stadium; Kent, OH	L 14–38		
September 30	at Bowling Green	University Stadium; Bowling Green, OH	L 11–28	8,451	
October 7	Ohio	Baujan Field; Dayton, OH	L 13–14	12,000	
October 14	at Louisville	Fairgrounds Stadium; Louisville, KY	W 7–6	4,236	
October 21	Xavier	Baujan Field; Dayton, OH	L 0–14		
October 28	Detroit	Baujan Field; Dayton, OH	L 12–41		
November 4	at Holy Cross	Fitton Field; Worcester, MA	L 0–28	8,000	
November 11	Miami (OH)	Baujan Field; Dayton, OH	L 6–48		
November 18	Wichita	Baujan Field; Dayton, OH	W 23–12		
