= 1961 Bradley Braves football team =

American college football season

1961 Bradley Braves football
- Conference: Independent
- Record: 6–4
- Head coach: Billy Stone (7th season)
- Home stadium: Bradley Stadium

1961 Midwestern college football independents records
	Conf.			Overall
Team	W	L	T	W		L		T
Baldwin–Wallace		–		9	–	0	–	0
Wheaton (IL)		–		8	–	0	–	0
Earlham		–		7	–	1	–	0
St. Norbert		–		7	–	2	–	0
Northern Michigan		–		6	–	2	–	0
Hillsdale		–		6	–	3	–	0
Ferris Institute		–		5	–	3	–	0
Bradley		–		6	–	4	–	0
Xavier		–		6	–	4	–	0
Eureka		–		3	–	2	–	1
Detroit		–		5	–	4	–	0
Drake		–		5	–	4	–	0
Wabash		–		5	–	4	–	0
Youngstown		–		4	–	4	–	1
Notre Dame		–		5	–	5	–	0
Concordia (IL)		–		4	–	4	–	0
St. Mary of the Plains		–		4	–	5	–	0
North Park		–		3	–	5	–	0
William Penn		–		3	–	5	–	1
St. Procopius		–		2	–	4	–	0
Dayton		–		2	–	8	–	0
Elmhurst		–		1	–	6	–	1
Rose Poly		–		0	–	8	–	0
Washington University		–		0	–	9	–	0

The 1961 Bradley Braves football team was an American football team that represented Bradley University of Peoria, Illinois, as an independent during the 1961 college football season. In its seventh season under head coach Billy Stone, the team compiled a 6–4 record.

== Schedule ==
Date	Opponent	Site	Result	Attendance	Source
September 16	State College of Iowa	Bradley Stadium; Peoria, IL	L 26–37	3,500	
September 23	at Butler	Butler Bowl; Indianapolis, IN	L 23–34	6,950	
September 30	Northern Michigan	Bradley Stadium; Peoria, IL	W 14–8		
October 7	at Washington University	Francis, Field; St. Louis, MO	W 33–21		
October 14	at Wheaton (IL)	McCully Field; Wheaton, IL	L 8–29		
October 21	Wabash^{†}	Bradley Stadium; Peoria, IL	W 21–10		
October 28	at Drake	Drake Stadium; Des Moines, IA	L 13–24	5,500–7,000	
November 4	at Milwaukee	Milwaukee, WI	W 33–0		
November 11	Toledo	Bradley Stadium; Peoria, IL	W 28–22		
November 18	at Western Illinois	Hanson Field; Macomb, IL	W 23–18	4,500	
^{†}Homecoming
