= 1961 Northern Michigan Wildcats football team =

American college football season

1961 Northern Michigan Wildcats football
- Conference: Independent
- Record: 6–2
- Head coach: Frosty Ferzacca (5th season)
- MVP: Frank Novak
- Home stadium: Memorial Field

1961 Midwestern college football independents records
	Conf.			Overall
Team	W	L	T	W		L		T
Baldwin–Wallace		–		9	–	0	–	0
Wheaton (IL)		–		8	–	0	–	0
Earlham		–		7	–	1	–	0
St. Norbert		–		7	–	2	–	0
Northern Michigan		–		6	–	2	–	0
Hillsdale		–		6	–	3	–	0
Ferris Institute		–		5	–	3	–	0
Bradley		–		6	–	4	–	0
Xavier		–		6	–	4	–	0
Eureka		–		3	–	2	–	1
Detroit		–		5	–	4	–	0
Drake		–		5	–	4	–	0
Wabash		–		5	–	4	–	0
Youngstown		–		4	–	4	–	1
Notre Dame		–		5	–	5	–	0
Concordia (IL)		–		4	–	4	–	0
St. Mary of the Plains		–		4	–	5	–	0
North Park		–		3	–	5	–	0
William Penn		–		3	–	5	–	1
St. Procopius		–		2	–	4	–	0
Dayton		–		2	–	8	–	0
Elmhurst		–		1	–	6	–	1
Rose Poly		–		0	–	8	–	0
Washington University		–		0	–	9	–	0

The 1961 Northern Michigan Wildcats football team was an American football team that represented Northern Michigan College (later renamed Northern Michigan University) as an independent during the 1961 college football season. In their fifth season under head coach Frosty Ferzacca, the Wildcats compiled a 6–2 record and outscored opponents by a total of 252 to 69, and were ranked No. 7 in the final UPI small college poll. They had been ranked No. 1 in the UPI polls released on October 18 and October 25 and No. 2 in the poll released on November 8.

Senior quarterback Frank Novak was chosen as the team's most valuable player. Novak completed 56 of 107 passes for 792 yards and 14 touchdowns during the 1961 season. Coach Ferzacca called Novak "a student of football with the poise, confidence and quick reaction of a great quarterback."

Guard Al Sandona received third-team honors on the 1961 Little All-America college football team.

End Wayne Sickler handled place-kicking and led all players in Michigan with 64 points (six touchdowns, 22 extra points, and two field goals) in eight games. Northern Michigan had the two top scorers among Michigan teams: Sickler with 64 points and Mike Mileski with 44 points.

Northern Michigan's star back Gene "Mickey" Valesano was ruled ineligible after the fourth game of the season when it was discovered that he had played one year at Superior State before enrolling at Northern Michigan and was thus playing his fifth season of college football.

The Wildcats' 61–6 victory over rival Michigan Tech broke Northern Michigan single-game scoring record.

== Schedule ==
Date	Opponent	Rank	Site	Result	Attendance	Source
September 9	vs. Central Michigan		Arthur Hill Stadium; Saginaw, MI	W 35–0	8,500	
September 16	Minnesota–Duluth		Memorial Stadium; Marquette, MI	W 35–6	5,000	
September 30	at Bradley		Bradley Stadium; Peoria, IL	L 8–14		
October 7	No. 2 Hillsdale	No. 8	Memorial Stadium; Marquette, MI	W 24–3	5,500	
October 14	at St. Norbert	No. 6	Minahan Stadium; De Pere, WI	W 36–7	4,000	
October 21	Illinois State Normal^{†}	No. 4	Memorial Stadium; Marquette, MI	W 47–6		
November 4	Michigan Tech	No. 4	Memorial Stadium; Marquette, MI (rivalry)	W 61–6	5,000	
November 11	Tampa	No. 4	Phillips Field; Tampa, FL	L 6–27	8,500–9,000	
^{†}Homecoming; Rankings from AP Poll released prior to the game
