= 1961 Ferris Institute Bulldogs football team =

American college football season

1961 Ferris Institute Bulldogs football
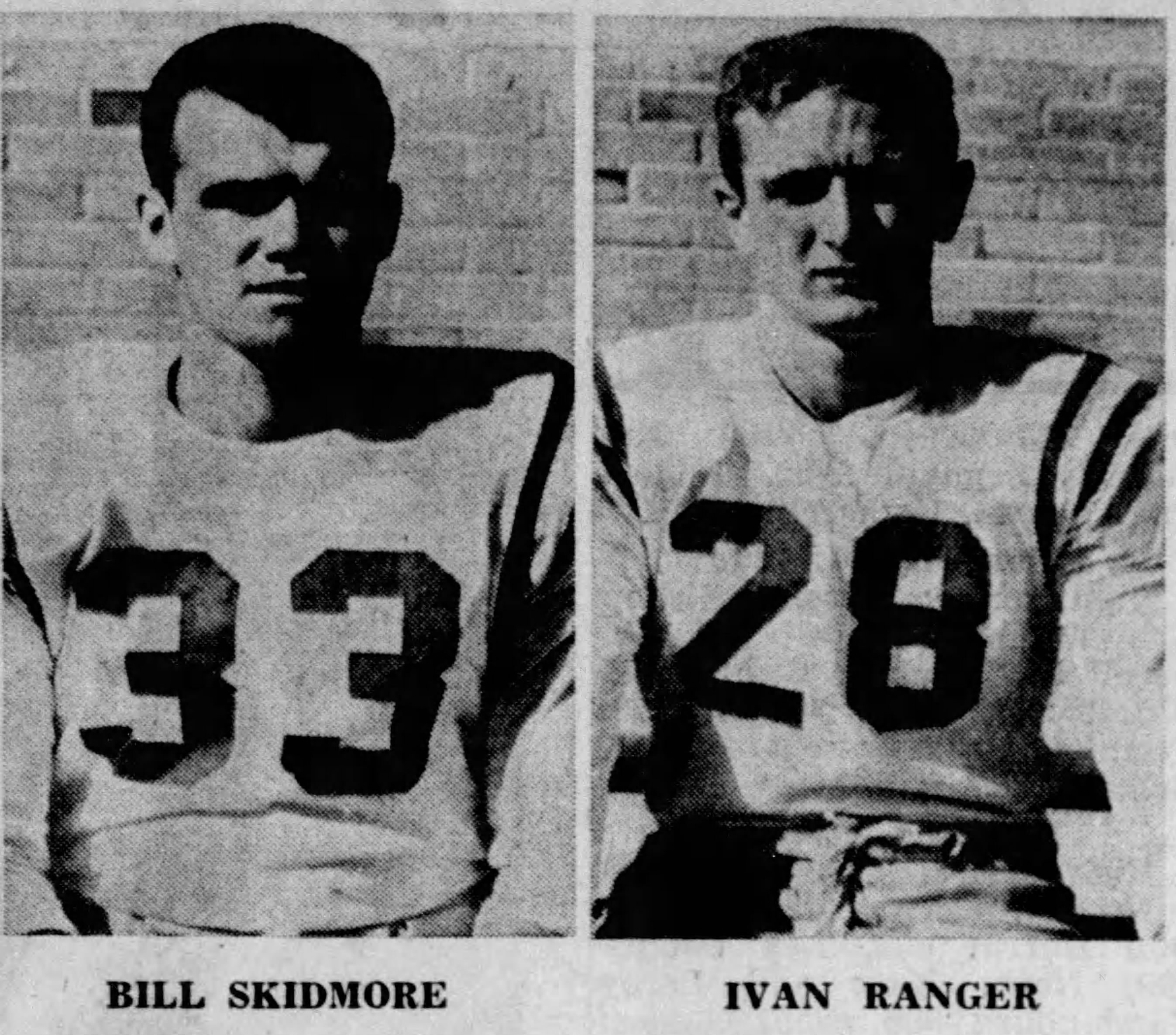
- Ferris stars Bill Skidmore and Ivan Ranger
- Conference: Independent
- Record: 5–3
- Head coach: Sam Ketchman (9th season)

1961 Midwestern college football independents records
	Conf.			Overall
Team	W	L	T	W		L		T
Baldwin–Wallace		–		9	–	0	–	0
Wheaton (IL)		–		8	–	0	–	0
Earlham		–		7	–	1	–	0
St. Norbert		–		7	–	2	–	0
Northern Michigan		–		6	–	2	–	0
Hillsdale		–		6	–	3	–	0
Ferris Institute		–		5	–	3	–	0
Bradley		–		6	–	4	–	0
Xavier		–		6	–	4	–	0
Eureka		–		3	–	2	–	1
Detroit		–		5	–	4	–	0
Drake		–		5	–	4	–	0
Wabash		–		5	–	4	–	0
Youngstown		–		4	–	4	–	1
Notre Dame		–		5	–	5	–	0
Concordia (IL)		–		4	–	4	–	0
St. Mary of the Plains		–		4	–	5	–	0
North Park		–		3	–	5	–	0
William Penn		–		3	–	5	–	1
St. Procopius		–		2	–	4	–	0
Dayton		–		2	–	8	–	0
Elmhurst		–		1	–	6	–	1
Rose Poly		–		0	–	8	–	0
Washington University		–		0	–	9	–	0

The 1961 Ferris Institute Bulldogs football team was an American football team that represented Ferris Institute (now known as Ferris State University) as an independent during the 1961 college football season. In their ninth year under head coach Sam Ketchman, the Bulldogs compiled a 5–3 record.

Key players included sophomore end Ivan Ranger and senior fullback Bill Skidmore.

== Schedule ==
Date	Opponent	Site	Result	Attendance	Source
September 16	Milwaukee	Big Rapids, MI	W 32–6		
September 23	Ohio Northern	Big Rapids, MI	W 12–7		
September 30	at St. Norbert	Minahan Stadium; De Pere, WI	L 7–35	1,800	
October 7	at Eastern Illinois	Lincoln Field; Charleston, IL	W 20–18	940	
October 14	Hillsdale^{†}	Big Rapids, MI	L 0–13	4,200	
October 21	Adrian	Big Rapids, MI	W 24–0		
October 28	Albion	Big Rapids, MI	L 6–28	2,700	
November 4	at Lakeland	Sheboygan, WI	W 34–7		
^{†}Homecoming
