= 1961 Youngstown Penguins football team =

American college football season

1961 Youngstown Penguins football
- Conference: Independent
- Record: 4–4–1
- Head coach: Dike Beede (23rd season)
- Home stadium: Rayen Stadium

1961 Midwestern college football independents records
	Conf.			Overall
Team	W	L	T	W		L		T
Baldwin–Wallace		–		9	–	0	–	0
Wheaton (IL)		–		8	–	0	–	0
Earlham		–		7	–	1	–	0
St. Norbert		–		7	–	2	–	0
Northern Michigan		–		6	–	2	–	0
Hillsdale		–		6	–	3	–	0
Ferris Institute		–		5	–	3	–	0
Bradley		–		6	–	4	–	0
Xavier		–		6	–	4	–	0
Eureka		–		3	–	2	–	1
Detroit		–		5	–	4	–	0
Drake		–		5	–	4	–	0
Wabash		–		5	–	4	–	0
Youngstown		–		4	–	4	–	1
Notre Dame		–		5	–	5	–	0
Concordia (IL)		–		4	–	4	–	0
St. Mary of the Plains		–		4	–	5	–	0
North Park		–		3	–	5	–	0
William Penn		–		3	–	5	–	1
St. Procopius		–		2	–	4	–	0
Dayton		–		2	–	8	–	0
Elmhurst		–		1	–	6	–	1
Rose Poly		–		0	–	8	–	0
Washington University		–		0	–	9	–	0

The 1961 Youngstown Penguins football team was an American football team that represented Youngstown College (now known as Youngstown State University) as an independent during the 1961 college football season. In its 23rd season under head coach Dike Beede, the team compiled a 4–4–1 record and was outscored by a total of 157 to 151.

The team played its home games at Rayen Stadium.

== Schedule ==
Date	Opponent	Site	Result	Attendance	Source
September 21	Central Michigan	Rayen Stadium; Youngstown, OH	W 36–7	7,500	
September 30	Toledo	Rayen Stadium; Youngstown, OH	W 14–12		
October 7	at Baldwin–Wallace	Ray E. Watts Stadium; Berea, OH	L 0–40	7,500	
October 14	Southern Connecticut State	Rayen Stadium; Youngstown, OH	W 28–8	4,000	
October 21	at Albright	Albright Stadium; Reading, PA	L 6–20	2,500	
October 28	at Hillsdale	Hillsdale, MI	L 0–30		
November 4	North Dakota	Rayen Stadium; Youngstown, OH	L 13–20		
November 9	Gustavus Adolphus	Rayen Stadium; Youngstown, OH	W 40–6		
November 16	Texas Lutheran	Rayen Stadium; Youngstown, OH	T 14–14		
