= 1961 Westminster Parsons football team =

American college football season

1961 Westminster Parsons football
- Conference: Independent
- Record: 7–1–1
- Head coach: Bob Lee (3rd season)

1961 NAIA independents football records
	Conf.			Overall
Team	W	L	T	W		L		T
No. 2 Baldwin–Wallace		–		9	–	0	–	0
Wheaton (IL)		–		8	–	0	–	0
No. 8 Tampa		–		8	–	1	–	0
Westminster (UT)		–		7	–	1	–	1
Earlham		–		7	–	1	–	0
Oklahoma Panhandle State		–		9	–	2	–	0
La Verne		–		7	–	2	–	0
Hillsdale		–		6	–	3	–	0
Eastern New Mexico		–		6	–	4	–	0
McMurry		–		6	–	4	–	0
St. Mary of the Plains		–		4	–	5	–	0
Georgetown (KY)		–		2	–	3	–	1
Austin		–		2	–	7	–	0
Rankings from NAIA poll

The 1961 Westminster Parsons football team was an American football team that represented Westminster University of Salt Lake City as an independent member of the National Association of Intercollegiate Athletics during the 1961 college football season. In their third season under head coach Bob Lee, the Griffins compiled a 7–1–1 record. After losing the season opener to Oregon Tech, the Parsons were undefeated in the remaining eight games.

Halfback Ron Hauser won All-American honors, leading his region with a total of 943 rushing yards on 139 carries, averaging 105 yards per game. He also led NAIA District Seven with 48 points scored. Ron Nay ranked fourth nationally among NAIA players in punting, averaging 43.2 yards per punt.

== Schedule ==
Date	Opponent	Site	Result	Attendance	Source
September 16	at Oregon Tech	Modoc Field; Klamath Falls, OR	L 6–12		
September 23	Eastern Montana	Dane Hansen Field; Salt Lake City, UT	W 20–6		
September 30	at College of Idaho	Caldwell, ID	W 13–7	250	
October 7	Colorado College	Dane Hansen Field; Salt Lake City, UT	T 6–6		
October 14	at Colorado Mines	Golden, CO	W 6–0		
October 28	La Verne	Dane Hansen Field; Salt Lake City, UT	W 25–13		
November 4	Dixie (UT)	Dane Hansen Field; Salt Lake City, UT	W 27–0		
November 11	at Carroll (MT)	Vigilante Stadium; Helena, MT	W 21–17		
November 17	at Weber	Weber Stadium; Ogden, UT	W 51–7		
