= 1961 Rocky Mountain Conference football season =

- Sport: Football
- Teams: 5
- Champion: Adams State

Football seasons

1961 Rocky Mountain Conference football standings
	Conf.					Overall
Team	W		L		T	W		L		T
Adams State $	4	–	0	–	0	8	–	2	–	0
Colorado College	2	–	2	–	0	5	–	3	–	1
Western State (CO)	2	–	2	–	0	4	–	5	–	0
Colorado Mines	2	–	2	–	0	3	–	6	–	0
Colorado State–Greeley	0	–	4	–	0	1	–	9	–	0
$ – Conference champion

The 1961 Rocky Mountain Conference football season was the season of college football played by the five member schools of the Rocky Mountain Conference (RMC) as part of the 1961 college football season. The 1961 Adams State Indians football team defeated all four conference opponents to win the conference championship and compiled an 8–2 overall record.

== Teams ==
=== Adams State ===
1961 Adams State Indians football

RMC champion
- Conference: Rocky Mountain Conference
- Record: 8–2 (4–0 RMC)
- Head coach: Darrell Mudra (3rd season)
- Home stadium: Rex Field

The 1961 Adams State Indians football team represented Adams State College (now known as the Adams State University) of Alamosa, Colorado. In their third year under head coach Darrell Mudra, the team compiled an 8–2 record (4–0 against RMC opponents) and won the RMC championship.

Five Adams State players were named to the 1961 all-conference team: halfback Bill Farnsworth; backs Walt Weaver, Bob Hidalgo, and Jim Edwards; and tackle Bob Dando.

Date	Opponent	Site	Result	Attendance	Source
September 16	New Mexico Western*	Rex Field; Alamosa, CO	W 43–12		
September 23	Arizona State–Flagstaff*	Rex Field; Alamosa, CO	W 14–6	4,700	
September 30	at Eastern New Mexico*	Portales, NM	L 13–32		
October 7	at Panhandle A&M*	Goodwell, OK	L 7–30		
October 14	at Western State (CO)	Gunnison CO	W 29–0		
October 21	New Mexico Highlands*	Rex Field; Alamosa, CO	W 32–8	5,100	
October 28	at Colorado State–Greeley	Greeley, CO	W 7–0		
November 4	at Colorado College	Colorado Springs, CO	W 25–8		
November 11	at Cal Poly*	Mustang Stadium; San Luis Obispo, CA	W 10–6	4,500	
November 18	Colorado Mines	Alamosa, CO	W 23–17		
*Non-conference game

=== Colorado College ===
1961 Colorado College Tigers football
- Conference: Rocky Mountain Conference
- Record: 5–3–1 (2–3 RMC)
- Head coach: Jerry Carle (5th season)
- Home stadium: Washburn Field

The 1961 Colorado College Tigers football team represented Colorado College of Colorado Springs, Colorado. In their fifth year under head coach Jerry Carle, the team compiled a 5–3–1 record (2–3 against RMC opponents) and finished in second place in the RMC.

Date	Opponent	Site	Result	Attendance	Source
September 16	Washburn*	Washburn Field; Colorado Springs, CO	L 14–18	1,000	
September 23	at St. Mary of the Plains*	Dodge City, KS	W 9–6		
September 30	Fort Hays State*	Washburn Field; Colorado Springs, CO	W 14–6	1,000	
October 7	at Westminster (UT)*	Salt Lake City, UT	T 6–6		
October 13	at Colorado State–Greeley	Jackson Field; Greeley, CO	W 24–13		
October 28	at Western State (CO)	Gunnison, CO	W 34–7		
November 4	Adams State	Washburn Field; Colorado Springs, CO	L 8–25		
November 11	Colorado Mines	Washburn Field; Colorado Springs, CO	L 7–10		
November 18	Nebraska Wesleyan*	Washburn Field; Colorado Springs, CO	W 34–14		
*Non-conference game

=== Western State ===
1961 Western State Mountaineers football
- Conference: Rocky Mountain Conference
- Record: 4–5 (2–2 RMC)
- Head coach: Kay Dalton (1st season)
- Home stadium: Perkins Stadium

The 1961 Western State Mountaineers football team represented Western State College (now known as Western Colorado University) of Gunnison, Colorado. In their first year under head coach Kay Dalton, the team compiled a 4–5 record (2–2 against RMC opponents) and finished in a tie for third place in the RMC.

Date	Opponent	Site	Result	Attendance	Source
September 16	Chadron State	Perkins Stadium; Gunnison, CO	W 56–12		
September 23	New Mexico Highlands	Perkins Stadium; Gunnison, CO	L 3–33	3,100	
September 30	at Idaho State	Spud Bowl; Pocatello, ID	L 10–22	3,500	
October 7	Colorado State–Greeley	Perkins Stadium; Gunnison, CO	W 10–8		
October 14	Adams State	Perkins Stadium; Gunnison, CO	L 0–29		
October 21	Eastern New Mexico	Perkins Stadium; Gunnison, CO	W 10–9		
October 28	Colorado College	Washburn Field; Gunnison, CO	L 7–34		
November 4	at Colorado Mines	Golden, CO	W 20–13		
November 10	at Central State (OK)*	Edmond, OK	L 0–30	5,000	
*Non-conference game

=== Colorado Mines ===
1961 Colorado Mines Orediggers football
- Conference: Rocky Mountain Conference
- Record: 3–6 (2–2 RMC)
- Head coach: Fritz S. Brennecke (15th season)

The 1961 Colorado Mines Orediggers football team represented Colorado School of Mines of Golden, Colorado. In their 15th year under head coach Fritz S. Brennecke, the team compiled a 3–6 record (2–2 against RMC opponents) and finished in a tie for third place in the RMC.

Date	Opponent	Site	Result	Attendance	Source
September 16	New Mexico Highlands*	Golden, CO	L 0–12		
September 23	at Idaho State*	Spud Bowl; Pocatello, ID	L 6–50	3,000	
September 30	Omaha*	Golden, CO	W 13–12		
October 7	at Washburn*	Topeka, KS	L 6–20		
October 14	Westminster (UT)*	Golden, CO	L 0–6		
October 21	Colorado State-Greeley^{†}	Golden, CO	W 13–6		
November 4	Western State (CO)	Golden, CO	L 13–20		
November 11	at Colorado College	Washburn Field; Colorado Springs, CO	W 10–7		
November 18	at Adams State	Alamosa, CO	L 17–23		
*Non-conference game; ^{†}Homecoming

=== Colorado State–Greeley ===
1961 Colorado State–Greeley Bears football
- Conference: Rocky Mountain Conference
- Record: 1–9 (0–4 RMC)
- Head coach: Joe Lindahl (8th season)
- Home stadium: Jackson Field

The 1961 Colorado State–Greeley Bears football team represented Colorado State College of Greeley, Colorado (now known as Northern Colorado University). In their eighth year under head coach Joe Lindahl, the team compiled a 1–9 record (0–4 against RMC opponents) and finished in last place in the RMC.

Date	Opponent	Site	Result	Attendance	Source
September 16	at South Dakota State*	Brookings, SD	L 13–36	5,000	
September 23	Omaha*		L 6–27		
September 30	Drake*	Jackson Field; Greeley, CO	L 0–7	4,000	
October 7	at Western State (CO)	Gunnison, CO	L 8–10		
October 13	Colorado College	Jackson Field; Greeley, CO	L 13–24		
October 21	at Colorado Mines	Golden, CO	L 6–13	3,200	
October 28	Adams State	Greeley, CO	L 0–7		
November 4	Idaho State*	Jackson Field; Greeley, CO	W 27–22		
November 11	South Dakota*	Jackson Field; Greeley, CO	L 14–16		
November 18	Nevada*	Mackay Stadium; Reno, NV	L 0–17	2,250	
*Non-conference game
