= Robert Lee Smith =

Robert Lee Smith may refer to:

- Bob Smith (fullback) (1929–2005), American football fullback
- Bobby Smith (running back) (born 1942), former American football collegiate and professional player
- Bobby Smith (safety) (born 1938), former American football player in the National Football League
