= 1961 North Texas State Eagles football team =

American college football season

1961 North Texas State Eagles football
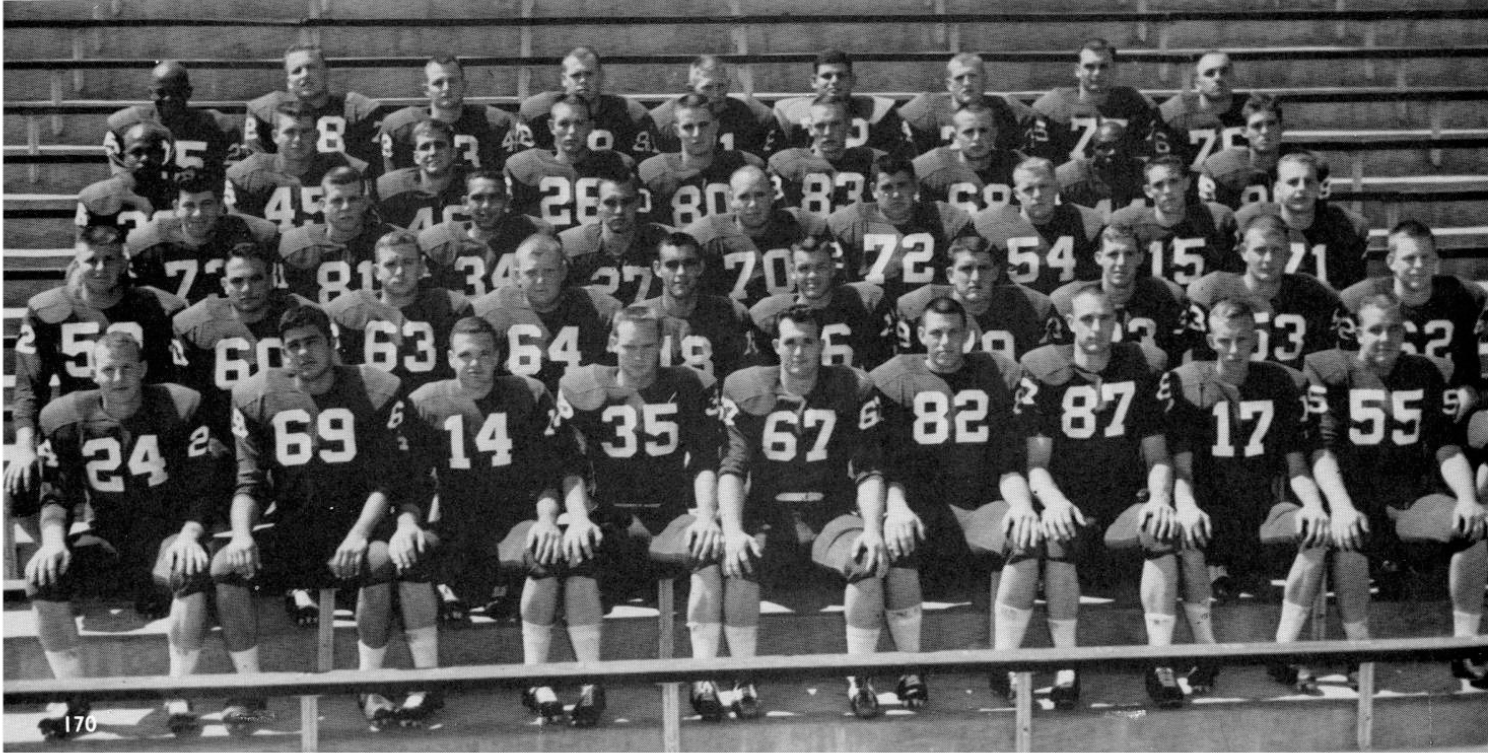
- 1961 North Texas team portrait from The Yucca yearbook
- Conference: Missouri Valley Conference
- Record: 5–4–1 (1–2 MVC)
- Head coach: Odus Mitchell (16th season)
- Home stadium: Fouts Field

1961 Missouri Valley Conference football standings
	Conf.					Overall
Team	W		L		T	W		L		T
Wichita $	3	–	0	–	0	8	–	3	–	0
North Texas State	1	–	2	–	0	5	–	4	–	1
Cincinnati	1	–	2	–	0	3	–	7	–	0
Tulsa	1	–	2	–	0	2	–	8	–	0
$ – Conference champion

The 1961 North Texas State Eagles football team was an American football team that represented North Texas State University (now known as the University of North Texas) during the 1961 college football season as a member of the Missouri Valley Conference (MVC). In their 16th year under head coach Odus Mitchell, the Eagles compiled a 5–4–1 record (1–2 in conference games), finished in a three-way tie for second place out of four teams in the MVC, and were outscored by a total of 206 to 162.

Sophomore halfback Bobby Smith led the team in both rushing (541 yards) and scoring (42 points). Smith and right halfback Billy Christle were among the first African-American players to play for a historically-white Southern football team; both received first-team honors on the 1961 All-Missouri Valley Conference football team.

The team played its home games at Fouts Field in Denton, Texas.

== Schedule ==
Date	Opponent	Site	Result	Attendance	Source
September 23	at Hardin–Simmons*	Public Schools Stadium; Abilene, TX	W 9–7	4,000	
September 30	BYU*	Fouts Field; Denton, TX	W 41–30	8,000	
October 7	New Mexico State*	Fouts Field; Denton, TX	T 14–14	8,000	
October 14	Wichita	Fouts Field; Denton, TX	L 14–26	5,000	
October 21	Tulsa^{†}	Fouts Field; Denton, TX	W 23–12	15,000	
October 28	at Cincinnati	Nippert Stadium; Cincinnati, OH	L 9–21	10,000	
November 4	Drake*	Fouts Field; Denton, TX	W 28–21	5,000	
November 11	at Memphis State*	Crump Stadium; Memphis, TN	L 0–41	6,921	
November 18	Louisville*	Fouts Field; Denton, TX	L 0–20	4,000	
November 25	at Texas Western*	Kidd Field; El Paso, TX	W 24–14	5,000	
*Non-conference game; ^{†}Homecoming

== Statistics ==
The 1961 North Texas team tallied 210.9 rushing yards and 33.5 passing yards per game. On defense, the team allowed opponents an average of 171.7 rushing yards and 118.0 passing yards per game.

Sophomore halfback Bobby Smith led both the team and the MVC with 541 rushing yards on 120 carries for an average of 4.5 yards per carry. Smith also led North Texas State in scoring with 42 points scored on seven touchdowns.

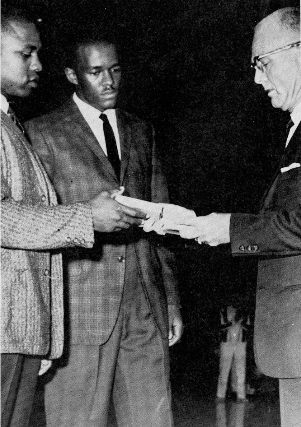
Billy Christle and Bobby Smith receive all-conference honors

Another halfback, Billy Christle, ranked second on the team in rushing with 524 yards on 98 carries for a 5.3-yard average. Smith and Christle were among the early African-Americans to play for North Texas, which became the first racially integrated football program in Texas two years earlier.

Quarterback Billy Ryan completed 20 of 50 passes (40.0%) for 179 passing yards for no touchdowns, two interceptions, and a 62.1 quarterback rating. End Mike Pirkle was the team's leading receiver with 72 receiving yards on four catches.

== Awards and honors ==
Halfbacks Bobby Smith and Billy Christle received first-team honors on the 1961 All-Missouri Valley Conference football team. Tackle Bill Kirbie, guard Billy Weaver, and fullback Arthur Perkins were named to the second team. Tackles Gerry Hawkins and Richard Farris and end Mike Pirkle received honorable mention.

Tackle Bill Kirbie and guard Billy Weaver were selected as the co-captains.

== Coaches ==
Head coach Odus Mitchell won his 100th game in the final game of the 1961 season. His assistant coaches were Fred McCain (backfield), Herb Ferrill (line), and Ken Bahnsen.
