= 1961 Wichita Shockers football team =

American college football season

1961 Wichita Shockers football
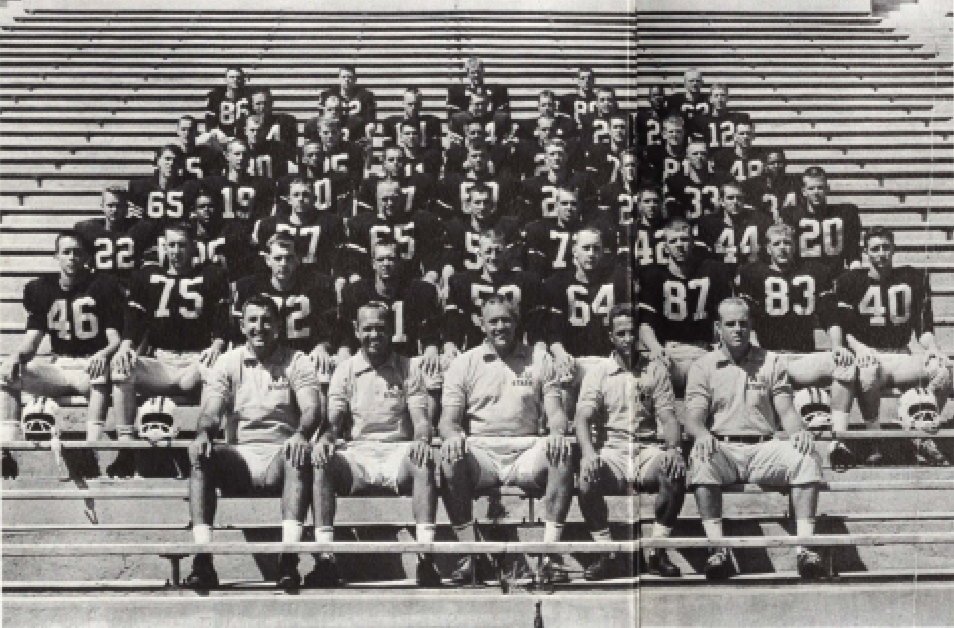
- Team portrait from Parnassus 1962

MVC champion

Sun Bowl, L 9–17 vs. Villanova
- Conference: Missouri Valley Conference
- Record: 8–3 (3–0 MVC)
- Head coach: Hank Foldberg (2nd season)
- Home stadium: Veterans Field

1961 Missouri Valley Conference football standings
	Conf.					Overall
Team	W		L		T	W		L		T
Wichita $	3	–	0	–	0	8	–	3	–	0
North Texas State	1	–	2	–	0	5	–	4	–	1
Cincinnati	1	–	2	–	0	3	–	7	–	0
Tulsa	1	–	2	–	0	2	–	8	–	0
$ – Conference champion

The 1961 Wichita Shockers football team was an American football team that represented the University of Wichita (now known as Wichita State University) as a member of the Missouri Valley Conference (MVC) during the 1961 college football season. In its second season under head coach Hank Foldberg, the team compiled an 8–3 record (3–0 against MVC opponents), won the MVC championship, and outscored opponents by a total of 230 to 189. Wichita finished the season with a 17–9 loss to Villanova in the Sun Bowl.

The team played its home games at Veterans Field, now known as Cessna Stadium. Pro Football Hall of Fame coach Bill Parcells was a sophomore end on the team.

== Schedule ==
Date	Opponent	Site	Result	Attendance	Source
September 16	at Toledo*	Glass Bowl; Toledo, OH	W 12–7	9,200	
September 23	at Arizona State*	Sun Devil Stadium; Tempe, AZ	L 7–21	29,600–30,000	
September 30	Cincinnati	Veterans Field; Wichita, KS	W 21–13	11,519	
October 7	at West Texas State*	Buffalo Bowl; Canyon, TX	W 41–34	15,000	
October 14	at North Texas State	Fouts Field; Denton, TX	W 26–14	5,000	
October 21	New Mexico State*	Veterans Field; Wichita, KS	W 42–27	11,260	
October 28	Tulsa	Veterans Field; Wichita, KS	W 9–7	11,770	
November 4	Oklahoma State*	Veterans Field; Wichita, KS	W 25–13	10,115	
November 11	Drake*	Veterans Field; Wichita, KS	W 26–13	9,130	
November 18	at Dayton*	Baujan Field; Dayton, OH	L 12–23		
December 30	vs. Villanova*	Kidd Field; El Paso, TX (Sun Bowl)	L 9–17	15,000	
*Non-conference game

== Statistics ==
The team gained an average of 194.9 rushing yards and 156.0 passing yards per game. On defense, the Shockers gave up an average of 211.6 rushing yards and 95.4 passing yards.

Wichita's two quarterbacks, Alex Zyskowski and Bill Stangarone, ranked first and second in total offense in the Missouri Valley Conference.

- Zyskowski led the conference with 1,038 passing yards. He completed 57 of 108 passes (52.%) with four touchdowns, nine interceptions, and a 129.1 quarterback rating. He also tallied 87 rushing yards for 1,125 yards of total offense.
- Stangarone, who played at both quarterback and halfback, tallied 701 yards of total offense. He completed 25 of 44 passes (56.8%) for 293 yards with three touchdowns, one interception, and a 130.7 quarterback rating. He also led the team in rushing with 408 rushing yards on 71 carries for a 5.7-yard average.

Wichita also had four of the top six scorers in the Missouri Valley Conference. Stangarone tied for the conference scoring crown with 42 points on six touchdowns and six points after touchdown. Alvin LeBlanc ranked third in the conference with 34 points (five touchdowns, four points after touchdown); end Ron Turner ranked fourth with 26 points (four touchdowns, two points after touchdown); and Dick Stephens tied for fifth with 24 points (four touchdowns).

Ron Turner was the conference's leading receiver with 24 catches for 341 yards and four touchdowns. Jim Maddox ranked second on the team and third in the conference with 16 receptions for 235 yards, an average of 14.7 yards per catch. Other receivers included J.R. Dumler (four receptions, 160 yards, 40.0-yard average) and Alvin LeBlanc (10 receptions, 140 yards, 14.0-yard average).

Frank Butz was the team's punter, kicking 40 times for 1,406 yards, an average of 35.2 yards per punt.

Alvin LeBlanc led the team with four interceptions returned for 63 yards, an average of 15.8 yards per return.

== Awards and honors ==
Six Wichita players received first-team honors on the Associated Press 1961 All-Missouri Valley Conference football team: quarterbacks Zyskowski and Stangarone; ends Ron Turner and Jim Maddox; center Leroy Leep; and guard Charles Wright. Tackle Gene Dempsey was named to the second team. Alvin LeBlanc, Richard Stephens, and Adolph Wilson received honorable mention.

== Players ==
- Rich Ashcroft (#36), halfback, 170 pounds
- Jerry Crain (#75), tackle, senior, 215 pounds
- Gene Dempsey (#72), tackle, 205 pounds
- J.R. Dumler (#44), fullback, 180 pounds
- Alvin LeBlanc (#24), halfback, sophomore, 187 pounds
- Leroy Leep (#53), center, 190 pounds
- Jim Maddox, end
- Bill Parcells (#87), end, 205 pounds
- Bill Stangarone (#15), quarterback, 172 pounds
- Dick Stephens (#42), halfback, sophomore, 175 pounds
- Ron Turner (#83), end, 196 pounds
- Adolph Wilson (#34), fullback, junior, 188 pounds
- Charles Wright (#64), guard, 210 pounds
- Alex Zyskowski #12), quarterback, 185 pounds
- Loren Schomacker (#33), fullback, 190
