= Soule College =

Former college in Dodge City, Kansas

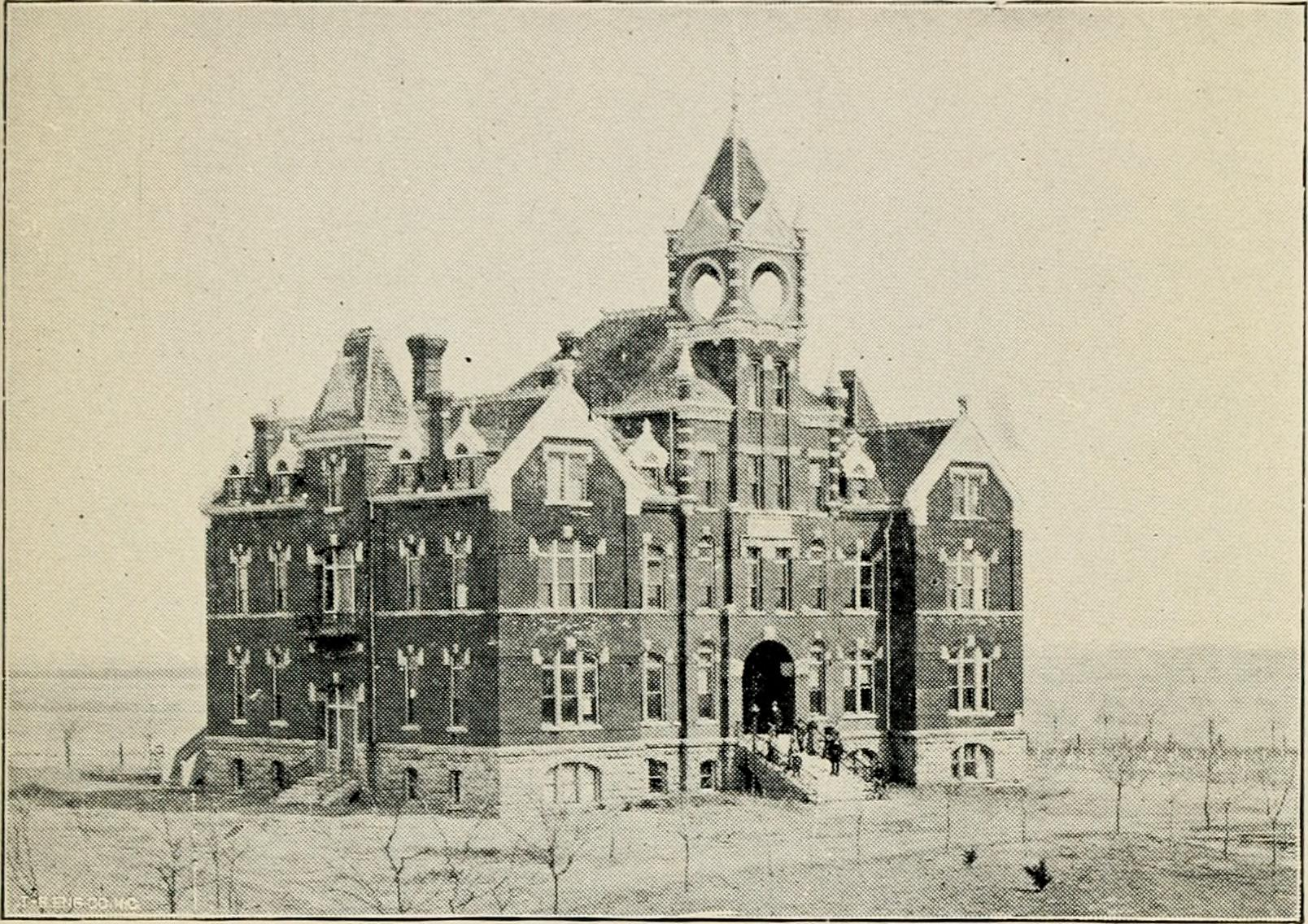
College Building

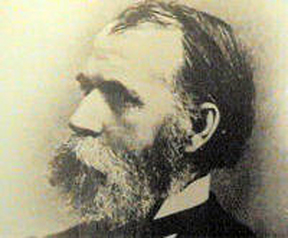
Asa Titus Soule

Soule College

Soule College was an institution of higher learning in Dodge City, Kansas, United States, that operated from 1888 until 1903. The college advertised board for $2 per week and tuition for $24 per year.

In the late nineteenth century, Asa Titus Soule, a native of Rochester, New York, made his fortune and reputation as the "Hop Bitters King" by peddling a patent medicine of Hop Bitters.

Looking for a place to invest his newfound millions, Soule traveled west to Kansas. He initially invested in a scheme to build an irrigation ditch across western Kansas, but soon decided to invest in higher education. In 1886 Soule partially endowed a new Presbyterian college in Dodge City with $50,000, thus giving birth to Soule College.

After the school closed, the property was eventually purchased by St. Mary of the Plains College, which closed in 1992.

== See also ==
- Gray County War
