= 1961 Bowling Green Falcons football team =

American college football season

1961 Bowling Green Falcons football

MAC champion

Mercy Bowl, L 6–36 vs. Fresno State
- Conference: Mid-American Conference
- Record: 8–2 (5–1 MAC)
- Head coach: Doyt Perry (7th season)
- Home stadium: University Stadium

1961 Mid-American Conference football standings
	Conf.					Overall
Team	W		L		T	W		L		T
Bowling Green $	5	–	1	–	0	8	–	2	–	0
Western Michigan	4	–	1	–	1	5	–	4	–	1
Miami (OH)	3	–	2	–	0	6	–	4	–	0
Ohio	3	–	2	–	1	5	–	3	–	1
Toledo	2	–	4	–	0	3	–	7	–	0
Marshall	1	–	4	–	0	2	–	7	–	1
Kent State	1	–	5	–	0	2	–	8	–	0
$ – Conference champion

The 1961 Bowling Green Falcons football team was an American football team that represented Bowling Green State University as a member of the Mid-American Conference (MAC) during the 1961 college football season. In their seventh season under head coach Doyt Perry, the Falcons compiled an 8–2 record (5–1 against MAC opponents), won the MAC championship, and outscored opponents by a combined total of 194 to 78.

On November 23, 1961, Bowling Green concluded its season with a 36–6 loss to Fresno State in the Mercy Bowl at the Los Angeles Memorial Coliseum. The game was Bowling Green's first bowl appearance and a fundraiser for the families of members of the Cal Poly Mustangs football team who died in a C-46 plane crash while returning home after a game at Bowling Green on October 29, 1960.

== Schedule ==
Date	Opponent	Site	Result	Attendance	Source
September 23	at Marshall	Fairfield Stadium; Huntington, WV	W 40–0	6,500	
September 30	Dayton*	University Stadium; Bowling Green, OH	W 28–11	8,451	
October 7	Western Michigan	University Stadium; Bowling Green, OH	W 21–0	8,000	
October 14	Toledo	University Stadium; Bowling Green, OH (rivalry)	W 17–6	12,243	
October 21	at Kent State	Memorial Stadium; Kent, OH (rivalry)	W 21–6	11,500	
October 28	Miami (OH)	University Stadium; Bowling Green, OH	L 6–7	9,546	
November 4	West Texas State*	University Stadium; Bowling Green, OH	W 28–6	11,000–11,250	
November 11	at Ohio	Peden Stadium; Athens, OH	W 7–6		
November 18	at Southern Illinois*	McAndrew Stadium; Carbondale, IL	W 20–0	7,000–7,500	
November 23	vs. No. 3 Fresno State	Los Angeles Memorial Coliseum; Los Angeles, CA (Mercy Bowl)	L 6–36	33,146	
*Non-conference game; Rankings from AP Poll released prior to the game

== Statistics ==
Classified for the first team in 1961 as a major college team, the Falcons ranked fourth in total defense, giving up an average of 161.8 yards per game. They also ranked sixth nationally in rushing defense (86.7 yards per game).

Senior back Russ Hepner missed two games with a knee injury, but still led the team with 637 rushing yards (4.8 yards per carry). He also led the team in scoring (36 points) and completed five of ten passes, had 14 receptions for 187 yards, and returned eight punts for 80 yards.

== Awards and honors ==
Three Bowling Green players received first-team honors on the 1961 All-MAC football team: senior Dick Newsome at end; senior Jerry Croft at tackle; and junior Gary Sheman at guard. Five other were placed on the second team: center Lou Youskievicz at center; junior Bob Reynolds at tackle; senior backs Jim Potts and Russ Hepner; and junior back Roger Reynolds.
