= 1961 Sun Bowl =

American college football game

Villanova Wildcats	Wichita Shockers
(7–2)	(8–2)
Independent	Missouri Valley
17	9
Head coach: Alexander F. Bell	Head coach: Hank Foldberg
	1	2	3	4	Total
Villanova	7	0	10	0	17
Wichita	0	3	0	6	9
- Date: December 30, 1961
- Season: 1961
- Stadium: Kidd Field
- Location: El Paso, Texas
- MVP: Billy Joe, FB
- Favorite: Shockers by 6
- Referee: John Wegerski (EAIFO; split crew: EAIFO, Missouri Valley)
- Attendance: 15,000

United States TV coverage
- Network: ABC

The 1961 Sun Bowl was a college football postseason bowl game between the Villanova Wildcats and the Wichita Shockers (now known as Wichita State).

== Background ==
Wichita was the champion of the Missouri Valley Conference for the fourth time in seven years.

== Game summary ==
Billy Joe's 19 yard run gave the Wildcats an early lead as the Shockers were limited to less than 200 yards of offense while committing four turnovers. A 47-yard drive got the Shockers onto the 18-yard line for a chance at narrowing the lead. Bill Seigle kicked a 36-yard field goal to make the halftime score 7–3. However, the Shockers' second half began disastrously. Richie Ross recovered a fumble on the opening kickoff of the second half at the 22 yard line of the Shockers. Seven plays later, Louis Rettino ran in for a two-yard score to make it 14–3. Sam Gruneisen kicked a 26-yard field goal to pile onto the lead for the Wildcats, who even knocked out the Shocker quarterback Alex Zyskowski for most of the second half. However, he came back with five minutes remaining in the game, and the Shockers benefited. He rushed for a five-yard score with :45 remaining, though it was not enough as the Wildcats won.

== Aftermath ==
Wichita head coach Hank Foldberg left the Shockers for Texas A&M after the season. The Wildcats returned to a bowl game the following year. Future National Football League head coach Bill Parcells played linebacker and recorded one kickoff return for 13 yards for Wichita.
