= 1961 Miami Redskins football team =

American college football season

1961 Miami Redskins football
- Conference: Mid-American Conference
- Record: 6–4 (3–2 MAC)
- Head coach: John Pont (6th season)
- MVP: Bill Triplett
- Captains: Joe Galat; Bill Triplett
- Home stadium: Miami Field

1961 Mid-American Conference football standings
	Conf.					Overall
Team	W		L		T	W		L		T
Bowling Green $	5	–	1	–	0	8	–	2	–	0
Western Michigan	4	–	1	–	1	5	–	4	–	1
Miami (OH)	3	–	2	–	0	6	–	4	–	0
Ohio	3	–	2	–	1	5	–	3	–	1
Toledo	2	–	4	–	0	3	–	7	–	0
Marshall	1	–	4	–	0	2	–	7	–	1
Kent State	1	–	5	–	0	2	–	8	–	0
$ – Conference champion

The 1961 Miami Redskins football team was an American football team that represented Miami University in the Mid-American Conference (MAC) during the 1961 college football season. In its sixth season under head coach John Pont, Miami compiled a 6–4 record (3–2 against MAC opponents), finished in third place in the MAC, held six of ten opponents to six or fewer points, and outscored all opponents by a combined total of 153 to 115.

Joe Galat and Bill Triplett were the team captains. Triplett, who led the team with 648 rushing yards, received the team's most valuable player award. Other statistical leaders included Jack Gayheart with 551 passing yards and Bob Jencks with 359 receiving yards (including 143 receiving yards against Ohio) and 50 points scored (five touchdowns, 13 extra points, and two field goals).

== Schedule ==
Date	Opponent	Site	Result	Attendance	Source
September 16	Villanova*	Miami Field; Oxford, OH	L 0–33		
September 23	Xavier*	Miami Field; Oxford, OH	W 3–0		
September 30	at Western Michigan	Waldo Stadium; Kalamazoo, MI	L 3–6	16,500	
October 7	at Kent State	Memorial Stadium; Kent, OH	W 21–0	11,000	
October 14	at Purdue*	Ross–Ade Stadium; West Lafayette, IN	L 6–19	41,924	
October 21	Ohio	Miami Field; Oxford, OH (rivalry)	L 18–28	12,500	
October 28	at Bowling Green	University Stadium; Bowling Green, OH	W 7–6	9,546	
November 4	Toledo	Miami Field; Oxford, OH	W 40–14	13,500	
November 11	at Dayton*	Baujan Field; Dayton, OH	W 48–6		
November 18	at Cincinnati*	Nippert Stadium; Cincinnati, OH (rivalry)	W 7–3	15,000	
*Non-conference game
