= 1961 Kent State Golden Flashes football team =

American college football season

1961 Kent State Golden Flashes football
- Conference: Mid-American Conference
- Record: 2–8 (1–5 MAC)
- Head coach: Trevor J. Rees (16th season)
- Home stadium: Memorial Stadium

1961 Mid-American Conference football standings
	Conf.					Overall
Team	W		L		T	W		L		T
Bowling Green $	5	–	1	–	0	8	–	2	–	0
Western Michigan	4	–	1	–	1	5	–	4	–	1
Miami (OH)	3	–	2	–	0	6	–	4	–	0
Ohio	3	–	2	–	1	5	–	3	–	1
Toledo	2	–	4	–	0	3	–	7	–	0
Marshall	1	–	4	–	0	2	–	7	–	1
Kent State	1	–	5	–	0	2	–	8	–	0
$ – Conference champion

The 1961 Kent State Golden Flashes football team was an American football team that represented Kent State University in the Mid-American Conference (MAC) during the 1961 college football season. In their 16th season under head coach Trevor J. Rees, the Golden Flashes compiled a 2–8 record (1–5 against MAC opponents), finished in seventh place in the MAC, and were outscored by all opponents by a combined total of 181 to 126.

The team's statistical leaders included Cullen Bowen with 275 rushing yards, George Jenkins with 387 passing yards, and Dick Wolf with 288 receiving yards.

== Schedule ==
Date	Opponent	Site	Result	Attendance	Source
September 15	at Xavier*	Xavier Stadium; Cincinnati, OH	L 8–16	7,120	
September 23	Dayton*	Memorial Stadium; Kent, OH	W 38–14		
September 30	at Ohio	Peden Stadium; Athens, OH	W 23–17		
October 7	Miami (OH)	Memorial Stadium; Kent, OH	L 0–21	11,000	
October 14	at Marshall	Fairfield Stadium; Huntington, WV	L 8–14		
October 21	Bowling Green	Memorial Stadium; Kent, OH (rivalry)	L 6–21	11,500	
October 28	at Toledo	Glass Bowl; Toledo, OH	L 22–31	6,800	
November 4	at Western Michigan	Waldo Stadium; Kalamazoo, MI	L 0–14	10,250	
November 11	Louisville*	Memorial Stadium; Kent, OH	L 15–19	4,000	
November 18	No. 2 Baldwin–Wallace*	Memorial Stadium; Kent, OH	L 6–14	3,500–6,437	
*Non-conference game; Rankings from Coaches' Poll released prior to the game
