= Joe Lindahl =

American football player, coach, and administrator (1919–2008)

Biographical details
- Born: March 14, 1919; Tilden, Nebraska, U.S.
- Died: January 11, 2008 (aged 88); Sun City, Arizona, U.S.

Playing career
- 1937–1940: Wayne State (NE)
- 1944: Ellington Field
- 1945: New York Giants
- Positions: Guard, end

Coaching career (HC unless noted)
- 1949–1951: Columbus HS (NE)
- 1952: Cozad HS (NE)
- 1953: Colorado State–Greeley (line)
- 1954–1962: Colorado State–Greeley

Administrative career (AD unless noted)
- 1963–?: Northern Colorado (assistant AD)
- ?–1982: Northern Colorado

Head coaching record
- Overall: 35–44–4 (college)

Virgil Youngquist "Joe" Lindahl (March 14, 1919 – January 11, 2008) was an American football player and coach and college athletics administrator. He served as the head football coach at Colorado State College—now known as University of Northern Colorado—in Greeley, Colorado from 1954 to 1962, compiling a record of 35–44–4.

Lindahl was born on March 14, 1919, in Tilden, Nebraska, to August and Ellen (Youngquist) Lindahl. He attended Tilden High School and the played college football and college basketball at Wayne State College in Wayne, Nebraska. Lindahl served in the United States Army Air Forces from 1941 to 1944 and played on the 1944 Ellington Field Fliers football team. He earned a Master of Arts degree from Colorado State College in 1949 and a doctorate from Indiana University Bloomington in 1964. Lindahl died on January 11, 2008, in Sun City, Arizona.

== Head coaching record ==
=== College ===
| Year | Team | Overall | Conference | Standing | Bowl/playoffs |
|---|---|---|---|---|---|
Colorado State–Greeley Bears (Rocky Mountain Conference) (1954–1962)
| 1954 | Colorado State–Greeley | 1–7–1 | 1–6–1 | 5th | |
| 1955 | Colorado State–Greeley | 1–7–1 | 1–6–1 | 6th | |
| 1956 | Colorado State–Greeley | 5–4 | 3–2 | T–2nd | |
| 1957 | Colorado State–Greeley | 6–3 | 3–2 | 3rd | |
| 1958 | Colorado State–Greeley | 5–3–1 | 3–2 | T–3rd | |
| 1959 | Colorado State–Greeley | 7–2 | 3–2 | 3rd | |
| 1960 | Colorado State–Greeley | 6–3–1 | 2–2–1 | 4th | |
| 1961 | Colorado State–Greeley | 1–9 | 0–4 | 5th | |
| 1962 | Colorado State–Greeley | 3–6 | 2–2 | T–2nd | |
| Colorado State–Greeley: | | 35–44–4 | 16–28–3 | | |
| Total: | | 35–44–4 | | | |
