= 1961 Cincinnati Bearcats football team =

American college football season

1961 Cincinnati Bearcats football
- Conference: Missouri Valley Conference
- Record: 3–7 (1–2 MVC)
- Head coach: Chuck Studley (1st season)
- Captains: Ken Byers; Don Ross
- Home stadium: Nippert Stadium

1961 Missouri Valley Conference football standings
	Conf.					Overall
Team	W		L		T	W		L		T
Wichita $	3	–	0	–	0	8	–	3	–	0
North Texas State	1	–	2	–	0	5	–	4	–	1
Cincinnati	1	–	2	–	0	3	–	7	–	0
Tulsa	1	–	2	–	0	2	–	8	–	0
$ – Conference champion

The 1961 Cincinnati Bearcats football team was an American football team that represented the University of Cincinnati as a member of the Missouri Valley Conference (MVC) during the 1961 college football season. In their first year under head coach Chuck Studley, the Bearcats compiled an overall record of 3–7 record with a mark of 1–2 in conference playing, finished in a three-way tie for second place out of four teams in the MVC, and were outscored by opponents 142 to 97. The team played home games at Nippert Stadium in Cincinnati.

Cincinnati's statistical leaders included Larry Harp with 426 passing yards, Phil Goldner with 277 rushing yards, and Jim Paris with 185 receiving yards.

== Schedule ==
Date	Opponent	Site	Result	Attendance	Source
September 16	Dayton*	Nippert Stadium; Cincinnati, OH	W 16–12	16,000–18,000	
September 23	at Boston College*	Alumni Stadium; Chestnut Hill, MA	L 0–23	18,000	
September 30	at Wichita	Veterans Field; Wichita, KS	L 13–21	11,519	
October 7	Xavier*	Nippert Stadium; Cincinnati, OH (rivalry)	L 12–17	25,000–28,000	
October 14	Air Force*	Nippert Stadium; Cincinnati, OH	L 6–8	15,000	
October 21	Houston*^{†}	Nippert Stadium; Cincinnati, OH	L 7–13	11,000	
October 28	North Texas State	Nippert Stadium; Cincinnati, OH	W 21–9	10,000	
November 4	at Tulsa	Skelly Stadium; Tulsa, OK	L 0–19	8,256	
November 18	Miami (OH)*	Nippert Stadium; Cincinnati, OH (Victory Bell)	L 3–7	15,000	
November 25	Detroit*	Nippert Stadium; Cincinnati, OH	W 19–13	7,500	
*Non-conference game; ^{†}Homecoming

== Statistics ==
The 1961 Bearcats were outgained by a total of 2,440 yards of net offense (244.0 yards per game) to 1,968 yards (196.8 yards per game) for the Bearcats.

The team's passing offense was led by quarterback Larry Harp who completed 40 of 107 passes for 426 yards with one touchdown and seven interceptions. Harp was followed by Bruce Vogelgesong who completed 12 of 29 passes for 144 yards with one touchdown and three interceptions. The leading receivers were Jim Paris (16 receptions, 185 yards) and Barry Hess (10 receptions, 118 yards.).

The team had seven players with at least 35 carries and over 100 rushing yards. The group was led by fullback Phil Goldner with 277 rushing yards on 70 carries for an average of 4.0 yards per game. Goldner was followed by fullback John Grad (243 yards), right halfback Fred Hynoski (223 yards), right halfback Jack Van Buren (212 yards), left halfback Hurdie Phillips (157 yards), and Hurdie Phillips.

The leading scorer was right halfback Fred Hynoski with three touchdowns for 18 points. Hynoski also punted 34 times for the team, tallying 1,311 yards, an average of 38.6 yards per punt.

On defense, C. Reinstatler led the team with four interceptions for 72 yards and a touchdown. Phil Goldner tallied three intereptions for 102 return yards.

== Awards and honors ==
Guard Rufus Simmons and tackle Ken Byers were selected by the conference coaches as first-team players for first-team honors on the 1961 All-Missouri Valley Conference football team.

Ken Byers and Don Ross were selected as the team captains.
