= 1961 Langston Lions football team =

American college football season

1961 Langston Lions football
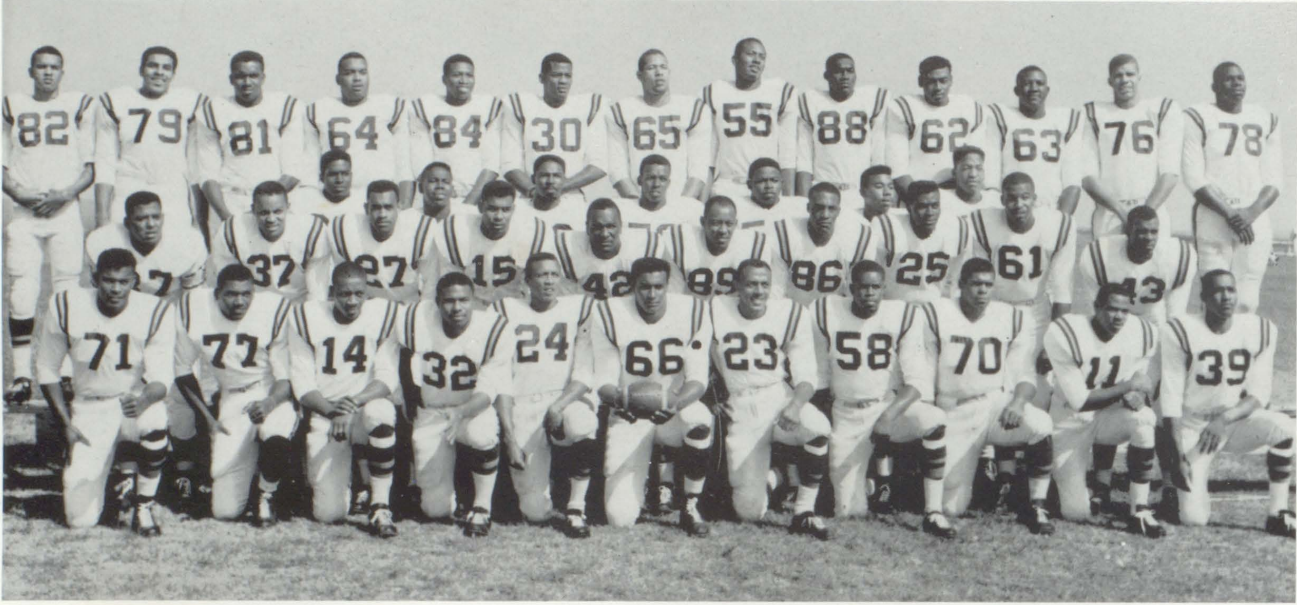
- 1961 team portrait from The Lion yearbook

OCC co-champion

All Sports Bowl, L 14–28 vs. Panhandle A&M
- Conference: Oklahoma Collegiate Conference
- Record: 8–2 (6–1 OCC)
- Head coach: Tim Crisp (4th season)
- MVP: Robert Phillips
- Captain: Edison Harrington
- Home stadium: Anderson Field

1961 Oklahoma Collegiate Conference football standings
	Conf.					Overall
Team	W		L		T	W		L		T
No. 9 Central State (OK) +	6	–	1	–	0	9	–	1	–	0
Langston +	6	–	1	–	0	8	–	2	–	0
No. 11 Panhandle A&M	4	–	1	–	0	9	–	2	–	0
East Central	3	–	4	–	0	5	–	5	–	0
SE Oklahoma State	2	–	4	–	0	4	–	6	–	0
Northeastern State	2	–	4	–	0	3	–	6	–	0
SW Oklahoma State	2	–	5	–	0	2	–	8	–	0
NW Oklahoma State	1	–	6	–	0	1	–	8	–	0
$ – Conference champion; Rankings from NAIA poll

The 1961 Langston Lions football team was an American football team that represented Langston University as a member of the Oklahoma Collegiate Conference (OCC) during the 1961 college football season. In their fourth year under head coach Tim Crisp, the Lions compiled an 8–2 record (6–1 in conference games), sharded the OCC title with the 1961 Central State Bronchos, and outscored opponents by a total of 287 to 109.

Langston led the National Association of Intercollegiate Athletics (NAIA) in both total defense (81.2 yards per game) and passing defense (23.6 yards per game) and ranked second in total offense (468.8 per game). Quarterback Donald Lee Smith led the NAIA in individual total offense with an average of 235.3 yards per game and was selected as a second-team player on the 1961 Little All-America college football team.

Langston was one of the first historically black universities to compete in a previously segregated football conference. The Lions joined the OCC in 1958 and won conference championships in 1959 and 1960.

The team played most of its home games in nearby Guthrie, Oklahoma, and its homecoming game at Anderson Field in Langston, Oklahoma.

== Schedule ==
Date	Opponent	Site	Result	Attendance	Source
September 16	Panhandle A&M	Guthrie, OK	W 33–14	5,000	
September 23	Central Oklahoma	Guthrie, OK	L 13–14	6,000	
September 30	at East Central	Norris Stadium; Ada, OK	W 32–6		
October 7	Texas College*	Farrington Field; Fort Worth, TX	W 45–7	3,746	
October 14	Southeastern Oklahoma State	Guthrie, OK	W 38–0		
October 21	Northeastern State	Guthrie, OK	W 20–7		
November 4	Northwestern Oklahoma State	Alva, OK	W 27–7	1,000	
November 11	at Southwestern Oklahoma State	Weatherford, OK	W 26–20		
November 18	Lincoln (MO)*^{†}	Anderson Field; Langston, OK	W 39–6		
December 9	vs. Panhandle A&M	Taft Stadium; Oklahoma City, OK (All Sports Bowl)	L 14–28	8,500	
*Non-conference game; ^{†}Homecoming

== Statistics ==
Langston set a new National Association of Intercollegiate Athletics (NAIA) record, allowing opponents to gain an average of only 81.2 yards per game. The Lions also led the NAIA in pass defense, giving up only 23.6 passing yards per game. Langston's opponents completed only 35 of 123 passes for 213 yards. Langston's rushing defense ranked fifth in the NAIA, as the team allowed only 518 rushing yards, an average of 57.5 yards per game.

Langston also ranked second in the NAIA with 4,025 yards of total offense (468.8 per game), consisting of 1,946 rushing yards and 2,079 passing yards. Quarterback Donald Lee Smith led the NAIA in individual total offense with an average of 235.3 yards per game (2,118 yards on 233 plays). Smith ranked fourth in the NAIA in passing, completing 87 of 171 passes (54.0%) for an average of 172.9 passing yards per game. Smith also had an 80-yard touchdown run against Panhandle A&M that was the fifth longest run in the NAIA during the 1961 season.

Langston also had two of the top receivers in the NAIA. Senior end DeWitt Anderson ranked ninth in the NAIA with 37 catches for 661 yards, an average of 73.4 yards per game. Sophomore end Randolph Furch ranked 13th with 37 catches for 587 yards, an average of 65.2 yards per game.

Backup quarterback Marvin Williamson handled punting duties for the team and ranked fourth in the NAIA with an average of 43.6 yards per punt.

== Awards and honors ==
Quarterback Donald Lee Smith was selected by the Associated Press as a second-team player on the 1961 Little All-America college football team.

Smith was also named back of the year in the OCC, and five Langston players received first-team honors on the 1961 All-OCC team: Smith at back; DeWitt Anderson and Randolph Furch at end; Roosevelt Nivens at offensive tackle; and Edison Harrington at defensive tackle.

== Personnel ==
=== Players ===
- Leroy Adams, end, sophomore, 196 pounds
- DeWitt Anderson, end, senior, 173 pounds
- John Bates
- Gene Batson
- George C. Brown
- Donald Butler
- Joe Butler, center, senior, 170 pounds
- Don Crockett
- James Cummings, guard, junior, 195 pounds
- Theodis Fipp
- Randolph Furch, end, sophomore, 198 pounds
- Silas Goree, center, junior, 195 pounds
- Edison Harrington (#66), guard, tackle and captain, senior, 220 pounds
- Ed Hurd
- Ralph Hurd
- Billy Hurte, halfback, senior, 165 pounds
- Archie Jones, halfback, junior, 170 pounds
- Fred Jones
- Jacob Knight
- Ovid Lacey
- Wilbur Law, tackle, senior, 190 pounds
- Leroy Mack
- Silver McQuarters, fullback, junior, 200 pounds
- Henry Moore, halfback, senior, 196 pounds
- Odell Nathaniel
- Roosevelt Nivens, tackle, senior, 220 pounds
- James Petit, end, junior, 172 pounds
- Robert Phillips
- Jimmy Pugh, guard, junior, 225 pounds
- Grover Quinn, tackle, junior, 202 pounds
- Charles Reed
- Richard Robinson
- Eddie Shegog
- Donald Lee Smith (#10), quarterback, senior, 175 pounds
- Billy Joe Snoody, halfback, senior, 165 pounds
- Charles Threat
- Roy Thurston, guard, senior, 180 pounds
- Marcellus Wade, tackle, senior, 215 pounds
- Ronnie Watson
- Eddie West, fullback, senior, 180 pounds
- Marvin Williamson, quarterback, sophomore, 175 pounds
- Charles Yokley

==== Gallery ====
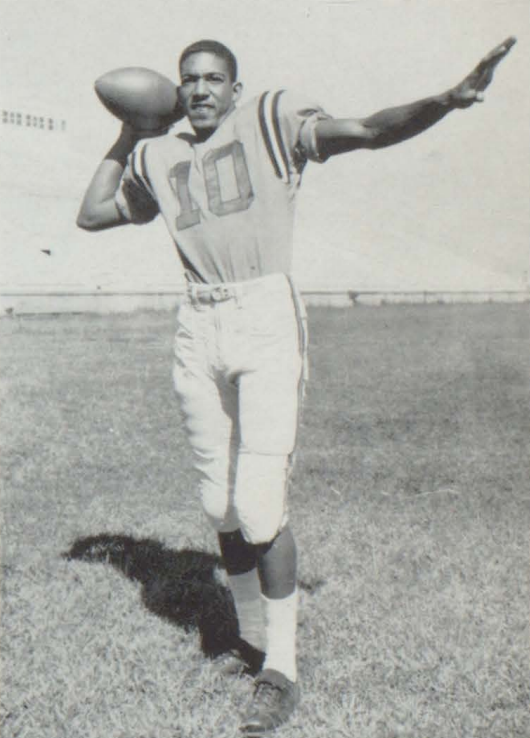
Quarterback Donald Lee Smith

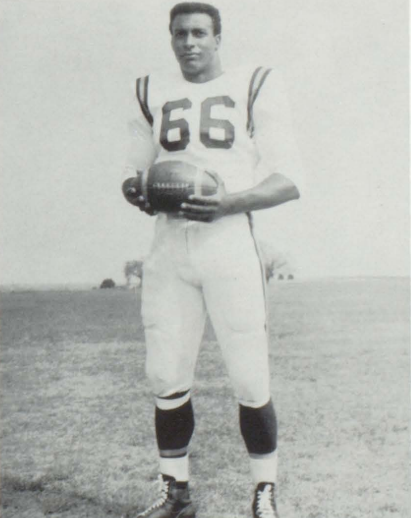
Captain Edison Harrington

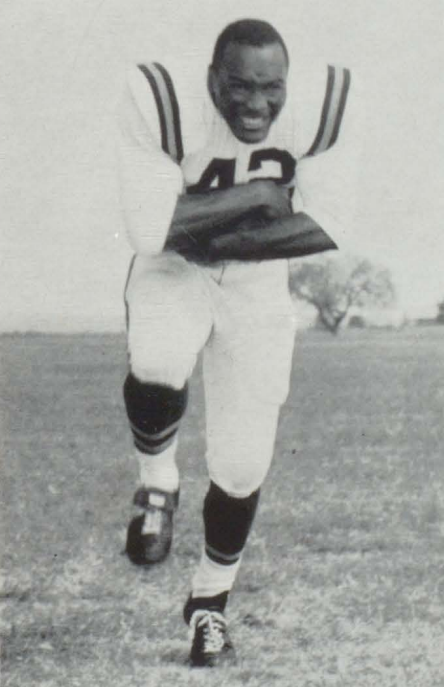
Fullback Silver McQuarter

=== Coaches ===
- Head coach: T. J. "Tim" Crisp
- Assistant coaches: Ray Johnson (line coach), Bernard Crowell (backfield coach)
