= Tim Crisp =

American football player and coach (1907–2004)

Biographical details
- Born: August 13, 1907; Ardmore, Oklahoma, U.S.
- Died: Apr 2005 (aged 97)

Playing career

Football
- 1927–1930: Langston
- Positions: Halfback, quarterback

Coaching career (HC unless noted)

Football
- 1931: Ardmore Douglass HS (OK) (assistant)
- 1932–1941: Ardmore Douglass HS (OK)
- 1945–1957: Ardmore Douglass HS (OK)
- 1958–1969: Langston

Basketball
- ?: Ardmore Douglass HS (OK)

Administrative career (AD unless noted)
- 1958–1970: Langston

Head coaching record
- Overall: 54–53–4 (college football)
- Bowls: 0–3

Accomplishments and honors

Championships
- 3 OCC (1959–1961)

Tobe Monroe "Tim" Crisp (August 13, 1907 – April 2005) was an American college football coach and player. He served as the head football coach at Langston University in Langston, Oklahoma from 1958 to 1969.

Crisp was born on August 13, 1907, in Ardmore, Oklahoma. He attended Ardmore Douglass High School, where the played as a halfback on the first football team ever fielded by the school, in 1923. He then played football, again as a halfback at Langston. After graduating from Langston in 1931, Crisp returned to Ardmore Douglas as an assistant football coach under E. W. Toliver before succeeding him as head football coach the next year. He also coached basketball at Ardmore Douglass.

Crisp was hired as head football coach at Langston in 1958. He retired as head football coach and athletic director at Langston in 1970.

== Head coaching record ==
=== College football ===
Year	Team	Overall	Conference	Standing	Bowl/playoffs	NAIA^{#}
Langston Lions (Oklahoma Collegiate Conference) (1958–1969)
1958	Langston	4–4	3–3	T–3rd	L Prairie View Bowl	
1959	Langston	7–1	6–0	1st	L Orange Blossom Classic	
1960	Langston	9–1	6–0	1st		9
1961	Langston	8–2	6–1	T–1st	L All Sports Bowl	
1962	Langston	1–6–1	1–5–1	7th		
1963	Langston	3–7	2–5	6th		
1964	Langston	2–5–2	1–4–2	7th		
1965	Langston	5–4	3–4	T–4th		
1966	Langston	5–4	4–3	5th		
1967	Langston	7–1–1	5–1–1	3rd		
1968	Langston	2–9	1–6	8th		
1969	Langston	1–9	0–7	8th		
Langston:		54–53–4	38–39–4			
Total:		54–53–4				
National championship Conference title Conference division title or championship game berth
