= Kenneth W. Keuffel =

American football player and coach (1923–2006)

Biographical details
- Born: September 19, 1923; Montclair, New Jersey, U.S.
- Died: February 19, 2006 (aged 82); Trenton, New Jersey, U.S.

Playing career
- 1943–1944: Princeton
- 1946: Princeton
- Position: Fullback

Coaching career (HC unless noted)
- 1952: Penn (freshmen)
- 1956–1960: Lawrenceville School (NJ)
- 1961–1966: Wabash
- 1967–2000: Lawrenceville School (NJ)

Head coaching record
- Overall: 28–20–5 (college); 159–89–8 (high school)

Kenneth William Keuffel (September 19, 1923 – February 19, 2006) was an American football coach. He was the 25th head football coach of the Wabash Little Giants football team in Crawfordsville, Indiana, serving for six seasons, from 1961 to 1966, and compiling a record of 28–20–5.

Raised in Montclair, New Jersey, Keuffel was a long-time coach at the Lawrenceville School and was a resident of the Lawrenceville section of Lawrence Township, Mercer County, New Jersey.

== Head coaching record ==
=== College ===
Year	Team	Overall	Conference	Standing	Bowl/playoffs
Wabash Little Giants (NCAA College Division independent) (1961–1966)
1961	Wabash	5–4			
1962	Wabash	5–3–1			
1963	Wabash	4–4–1			
1964	Wabash	3–3–2			
1965	Wabash	7–2			
1966	Wabash	4–4–1			
Wabash:		28–20–5			
Total:		28–20–5			
