= 1961 Western Michigan Broncos football team =

American college football season

1961 Western Michigan Broncos football

Aviation Bowl, L 12–20 vs. New Mexico
- Conference: Mid-American Conference
- Record: 5–4–1 (4–1–1 MAC)
- Head coach: Merle Schlosser (5th season)
- MVP: Ed Chlebek
- Captains: Mike Snodgrass; Ken Reasor
- Home stadium: Waldo Stadium

1961 Mid-American Conference football standings
	Conf.					Overall
Team	W		L		T	W		L		T
Bowling Green $	5	–	1	–	0	8	–	2	–	0
Western Michigan	4	–	1	–	1	5	–	4	–	1
Miami (OH)	3	–	2	–	0	6	–	4	–	0
Ohio	3	–	2	–	1	5	–	3	–	1
Toledo	2	–	4	–	0	3	–	7	–	0
Marshall	1	–	4	–	0	2	–	7	–	1
Kent State	1	–	5	–	0	2	–	8	–	0
$ – Conference champion

The 1961 Western Michigan Broncos football team represented Western Michigan University in the Mid-American Conference (MAC) during the 1961 college football season. In their fifth season under head coach Merle Schlosser, the Broncos compiled a 5–4–1 record (4–1–1 against MAC opponents), finished in second place in the MAC, and were outscored by their opponents, 179 to 143. The team played its home games at Waldo Stadium in Kalamazoo, Michigan.

Center Mike Snodgrass and guard Ken Reasor were the team captains. Quarterback Ed Chlebek received the team's most outstanding player award.

== Schedule ==
Date	Opponent	Site	Result	Attendance	Source
September 16	at Central Michigan*	Alumni Field; Mount Pleasant, MI (rivalry)	W 27–21	6,800	
September 23	at Detroit*	University of Detroit Stadium; Detroit, MI	L 14–21	18,000–18,603	
September 30	Miami (OH)	Waldo Stadium; Kalamazoo, MI	W 6–3	16,500	
October 7	at Bowling Green	University Stadium; Bowling Green, OH	L 0–21	8,000	
October 21	at Toledo	Glass Bowl; Toledo, OH	W 7–0	5,500	
October 28	Marshall	Waldo Stadium; Kalamazoo, MI	W 20–0	10,500	
November 4	Kent State	Waldo Stadium; Kalamazoo, MI	W 14–0	10,250	
November 11	Utah State*	Waldo Stadium; Kalamazoo, MI	L 22–65	11,750–14,000	
November 18	at Ohio	Peden Stadium; Athens, OH	T 20–20	9,500	
December 9	vs. New Mexico*	Welcome Stadium; Dayton, OH (Aviation Bowl)	L 12–20	3,694	
*Non-conference game
