= Jack Swartz =

American football coach and athletics administrator (1930–1997)

Biographical details
- Born: March 31, 1930; Flint, Michigan, U.S.
- Died: July 11, 1997 (aged 67); Wheaton, Illinois, U.S.

Playing career
- 1948–1951: Wheaton (IL)

Coaching career (HC unless noted)
- 1958–1960: Wheaton (IL) (assistant)
- 1961–1968: Wheaton (IL)

Administrative career (AD unless noted)
- 1975–1983: Wheaton (IL) (assistant)

Head coaching record
- Overall: 41–30

Jack Lee Swartz (March 31, 1930 – July 11, 1997) was an American football coach and athletics administrator. He served as the head football coach at Wheaton College in Wheaton, Illinois for eight seasons, from 1961 to 1968, compiling a record of 41–30. Swartz was also the athletic director at Wheaton from 1975 to 1983.

Swartz played college football at Wheaton before graduating in 1952. He then earned a master's degree in educational administration from Michigan State University. After serving the military and pursuing more graduate studies at Indiana University, Swartz worked as a community school director in Flint, Michigan, his hometown. He went back to Wheaton in 1958 as an assistant football coach, and succeeded Harvey Chrouser as head football coach in 1961.

In 1973, Swartz received a doctorate degree from the University of Northern Colorado. He died on July 11, 1997, at his home in Wheaton. At the time of his death he was still on the faculty of Wheaton College, serving as associate athletic director.

== Head coaching record ==
Year	Team	Overall	Conference	Standing	Bowl/playoffs
Wheaton Crusaders (NCAA College Division independent) (1961–1968)
1961	Wheaton	8–0			
1962	Wheaton	5–4			
1963	Wheaton	8–1			
1964	Wheaton	2–7			
1965	Wheaton	1–8			
1966	Wheaton	5–4			
1967	Wheaton	7–2			
1968	Wheaton	5–4			
Wheaton:		41–30			
Total:		41–30			
