= 1961 Ohio Bobcats football team =

American college football season

1961 Ohio Bobcats football
- Conference: Mid-American Conference
- Record: 5–3–1 (3–2–1 MAC)
- Head coach: Bill Hess (4th season)
- Home stadium: Peden Stadium

1961 Mid-American Conference football standings
	Conf.					Overall
Team	W		L		T	W		L		T
Bowling Green $	5	–	1	–	0	8	–	2	–	0
Western Michigan	4	–	1	–	1	5	–	4	–	1
Miami (OH)	3	–	2	–	0	6	–	4	–	0
Ohio	3	–	2	–	1	5	–	3	–	1
Toledo	2	–	4	–	0	3	–	7	–	0
Marshall	1	–	4	–	0	2	–	7	–	1
Kent State	1	–	5	–	0	2	–	8	–	0
$ – Conference champion

The 1961 Ohio Bobcats football team was an American football team that represented Ohio University in the Mid-American Conference (MAC) during the 1961 college football season. In their fourth season under head coach Bill Hess, the Bobcats compiled a 5–3–1 record (3–2–1 against MAC opponents), finished in fourth place in the MAC, and outscored all opponents by a combined total of 129 to 116. They played their home games in Peden Stadium in Athens, Ohio.

The team's statistical leaders included Otis Wagner with 441 rushing yards, Bob Babbitt with 573 passing yards, and John Trevis with 258 receiving yards.

== Schedule ==
Date	Opponent	Site	Result	Attendance	Source
September 23	at Toledo	Glass Bowl; Toledo, OH	W 10–6	9,200–10,100	
September 30	Kent State	Peden Stadium; Athens, OH	L 17–23		
October 7	at Dayton	Baujan Field; Dayton, OH	W 14–13	12,000	
October 14	Xavier*	Peden Stadium; Athens, OH	L 3–6	14,000	
October 21	at Miami (OH)	Miami Field; Oxford, OH (rivalry)	W 28–18	12,500	
October 28	at Delaware*	Delaware Stadium; Newark, DE	W 17–16	8,750	
November 4	at Marshall	Fairfield Stadium; Huntington, WV (rivalry)	W 14–7		
November 11	Bowling Green	Peden Stadium; Athens, OH	L 6–7		
November 18	Western Michigan	Peden Stadium; Athens, OH	T 20–20		
*Non-conference game
