= 1961 Tulsa Golden Hurricane football team =

American college football season

1961 Tulsa Golden Hurricane football
- Conference: Missouri Valley Conference
- Record: 2–8 (1–2 MVC)
- Head coach: Glenn Dobbs (1st season)
- Home stadium: Skelly Stadium

1961 Missouri Valley Conference football standings
	Conf.					Overall
Team	W		L		T	W		L		T
Wichita $	3	–	0	–	0	8	–	3	–	0
North Texas State	1	–	2	–	0	5	–	4	–	1
Cincinnati	1	–	2	–	0	3	–	7	–	0
Tulsa	1	–	2	–	0	2	–	8	–	0
$ – Conference champion

The 1961 Tulsa Golden Hurricane football team was an American football team that represented the University of Tulsa as a member of the Missouri Valley Conference (MVC) during the 1961 college football season. In their first year under head coach Glenn Dobbs, the Golden Hurricane compiled a 2–8 record (1–2 in conference games), finished in a three-way tie for second place out of four teams in the MVC, and were outscored by a total of 205 to 91.

The team's statistical leaders included Ronnie Sine with 512 passing yards, David White with 293 rushing yards, and Max Letterman with 277 receiving yards.

The team played its home games at Skelly Stadium in Tulsa, Oklahoma.

== Schedule ==
Date	Opponent	Site	Result	Attendance	Source
September 16	Hardin–Simmons*	Skelly Stadium; Tulsa, OK	W 27–0	14,408	
September 23	Memphis State*	Skelly Stadium; Tulsa, OK	L 12–48	14,252	
September 30	at Arkansas*	Razorback Stadium; Fayetteville, AR	L 0–6	18,000	
October 7	at Oklahoma State*	Lewis Field; Stillwater, OK (rivalry)	L 0–26	18,500	
October 14	at Tennessee*	Shields–Watkins Field; Knoxville, TN	L 6–52	23,439	
October 21	at North Texas State	Fouts Field; Denton, TX	L 12–23	15,000	
October 28	at Wichita	Veterans Field; Wichita, KS	L 7–9	11,770	
November 4	Cincinnati	Skelly Stadium; Tulsa, OK	W 19–0	8,256	
November 11	Houston*^{†}	Skelly Stadium; Tulsa, OK	L 2–14	10,278	
November 18	Iowa State*	Skelly Stadium; Tulsa, OK	L 6–27	6,660	
*Non-conference game; ^{†}Homecoming

== Statistics ==
David White led the team in rushing with 293 yards on 74 carries for an average of 4.0 yards per carry. He was followed by Bo Bolinger with 265 yards on 76 carries for an average of 3.5 yards per carry. Monte Thrailkill ranked third on the team with 228 yards on 56 carries for an average of 4.1 yards per carry.

Bolinger led the team in scoring with 24 points on four touchdowns.

Ronnie Sine led the team in passing, completing 44 of 94 passes for 512 yards with four touchdowns, eight interceptions, and an 89.6 quarterback rating. Ramiro Escandon also completed 22 of 63 passes for 229 yards with no touchdowns, seven interceptions, and a 43.2 quarterback rating. Escandon transferred from the University of Denver after that school discontinued its football program in January 1961.

Max Letterman led the team in receiving, tallying 21 receptions for 277 yards with one touchdown.

Jim Furlong handled punting for the Golden Hurricane, punting 42 times for an average of 34.6 yards per punt.

== Awards and honors ==
Three Tulsa players received first-team honors on the 1961 Missouri Valley Conference all-star football team selected by the conference coaches: fullback Bo Bolinger; guard Kenny Reed; and tackle Joe Novsek. End Jim Furlong and fullback David White were named to the second team.

== Players ==
Varsity letters were awarded to all players who played at least 100 minutes on the 1961 Tulsa football team. Guard Kenny Reed, end Jim Furlong, and tackle Tony Liscio led the team with 391, 371, and 367 minutes played, respectively, out of a possible 600. A total of 34 players received the honor as follows:

- Orville Dean "Bo" Bolinger, fullback, senior, 301 minutes
- Hank Dorsch, halfback, 109 minutes
- Kennedy Eddy, guard, 208 minutes
- Ramiro Escandon, quarterback, 149 minutes
- Bill Farney, end, 104 minutes
- Bill Framel, senior, 100 minutes
- Jim Furlong, end, 371 minutes
- Bill Gary, senior, 104 minutes
- Bill Hammons, end, 100 minutes
- Dean Hendryx, defensive specialist, senior, 140 minutes
- Dan Howard, center, 190 minutes
- Max Letterman, senior, 184 minutes
- Tony Liscio, tackle, 367 minutes
- Jim Lowe, end, 119 minutes
- Bobby McGoffin, halfback, 154 minutes
- Dick Middleton, center, senior, 187 minutes
- Don Murphy, tackle, 107 minutes
- Virgil Nason, 180 minutes
- Art Neece, halfback, senior, 100 minutes
- Joe Novsek, tackle, senior, 305 minutes
- Leon Pagac, guard, 151 minutes
- Charlie Phillips, halfback, 147 minutes
- Gary Rawls, tackle, 196 minutes
- Kenny Reed, guard, 391 minutes
- John Rougeot, guard, 139 minutes
- Bill Shewey, defensive specialist, 297 minutes
- Ronnie Sine, quarterback, 171 minutes
- Coy Stewart, halfback, 221 minutes
- Stu Stewart, defensive specialist, 262 minutes
- Jerry Swanson, 100 minutes
- Monte Thrailkill, halfback, 191 minutes
- Joel Walenta, tackle, senior, 236 minutes
- Keith/Curt Wheeless, center, 196 minutes
- David White, fullback, senior, 260 minutes
