= 1961 Toledo Rockets football team =

American college football season

1961 Toledo Rockets football
- Conference: Mid-American Conference
- Record: 3–7 (2–4 MAC)
- Head coach: Clive Rush (2nd season)
- Home stadium: Glass Bowl

1961 Mid-American Conference football standings
	Conf.					Overall
Team	W		L		T	W		L		T
Bowling Green $	5	–	1	–	0	8	–	2	–	0
Western Michigan	4	–	1	–	1	5	–	4	–	1
Miami (OH)	3	–	2	–	0	6	–	4	–	0
Ohio	3	–	2	–	1	5	–	3	–	1
Toledo	2	–	4	–	0	3	–	7	–	0
Marshall	1	–	4	–	0	2	–	7	–	1
Kent State	1	–	5	–	0	2	–	8	–	0
$ – Conference champion

The 1961 Toledo Rockets football team was an American football team that represented Toledo University in the Mid-American Conference (MAC) during the 1961 college football season. In their second season under head coach Clive Rush, the Rockets compiled a 3–7 record (2–4 in conference games) and finished in fifth place in the MAC.

The team's statistical leaders included Phil Yenrick with 563 passing yards, Frank Baker with 739 rushing yards, and Pete Jollif with 330 receiving yards. Yenrick was selected as the quarterback for the 1961 All-MAC football team.

== Schedule ==
Date	Opponent	Site	Result	Attendance	Source
September 16	Wichita*	Glass Bowl; Toledo, OH	L 7–12	9,200	
September 23	Ohio	Glass Bowl; Toledo, OH	L 6–10	9,200–10,100	
September 30	at Youngstown*	Youngstown, OH	L 12–14	7,200	
October 7	Marshall	Glass Bowl; Toledo, OH	W 33–6	7,800	
October 14	at Bowling Green	University Stadium; Bowling Green, OH (rivalry)	L 6–17	12,243	
October 21	Western Michigan	Glass Bowl; Toledo, OH	L 0–7	5,500	
October 28	Kent State^{†}	Glass Bowl; Toledo, OH	W 31–22	6,800	
November 4	at Miami (OH)	Miami Field; Oxford, OH	L 14–40	13,500	
November 11	at Bradley*	Bradley Stadium; Peoria, IL	L 22–28		
November 18	at Temple*	Temple Stadium; Philadelphia, PA	W 15–14	5,000	
*Non-conference game; ^{†}Homecoming
