= Sam Gruneisen =

American football player and coach (1941–2012)

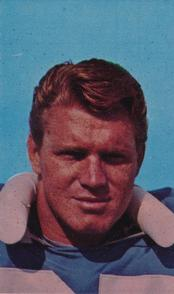
- Gruneisen c. 1969

No. 65
- Position: Center

Personal information
- Born: January 16, 1941; Louisville, Kentucky, U.S.
- Died: September 28, 2012 (aged 71); Orlando, Florida, U.S.

Career information
- College: Villanova
- AFL draft: 1962: 25th round, 200th overall pick

Career history

Playing
- San Diego Chargers (1962–1972); Houston Oilers (1973)

Coaching
- California (1981–1983) (OL); Los Angeles Express (1984–1985) (AHC); San Jose State (1986) (DC); Los Angeles Raiders (1987–1990) (LB); Eastern Michigan (1995–1998) (DC); Gardner–Webb (2000–2002) (OL)

Awards and highlights
- AFL champion (1963)

Career statistics
- Games played: 130
- Games started: 81
- Stats at Pro Football Reference

Samuel Kenneth Gruneisen (Pronounced: Grew-NICE-un) (January 16, 1941 – September 28, 2012) was an American football player and coach. He played professionally as a center in the American Football League (AFL) for the San Diego Chargers and in the National Football League (NFL) for the Chargers and Houston Oilers. Gruneisen played college football Villanova University. He kicked two point after touchdowns and a 26-yard field goal in Villanova's 17–9 victory over Wichita State in the 1961 Sun Bowl.

After his playing career, Gruneisen coached at several levels of the sport.

== See also ==
- List of American Football League players
