= 1961 Marshall Thundering Herd football team =

American college football season

1961 Marshall Thundering Herd football
- Conference: Mid-American Conference
- Record: 2–7–1 (1–4 MAC)
- Head coach: Charlie Snyder (3rd season)
- Captains: Ralph May; Rucker Wickline
- Home stadium: Fairfield Stadium

1961 Mid-American Conference football standings
	Conf.					Overall
Team	W		L		T	W		L		T
Bowling Green $	5	–	1	–	0	8	–	2	–	0
Western Michigan	4	–	1	–	1	5	–	4	–	1
Miami (OH)	3	–	2	–	0	6	–	4	–	0
Ohio	3	–	2	–	1	5	–	3	–	1
Toledo	2	–	4	–	0	3	–	7	–	0
Marshall	1	–	4	–	0	2	–	7	–	1
Kent State	1	–	5	–	0	2	–	8	–	0
$ – Conference champion

The 1961 Marshall Thundering Herd football team was an American football team that represented Marshall University in the Mid-American Conference (MAC) during the 1961 college football season. In its third season under head coach Charlie Snyder, the Thundering Herd compiled a 2–7–1 record (1–4 against conference opponents), finished in sixth place out of seven teams in the MAC, and was outscored by a total of 183 to 62. Ralph May and Rucker Wickline were the team captains. Marshall played home games at Fairfield Stadium in Huntington, West Virginia.

Two Marshall players were selected by the conference coaches as first-team players on the 1961 All-MAC football team: halfback Millard Fleming and center Rucker Wickline. Fleming was a unanimous pick.

== Schedule ==
Date	Opponent	Site	Result	Attendance	Source
September 16	VMI*	Fairfield Stadium; Huntington, WV	L 6–33	8,000	
September 23	Bowling Green	Fairfield Stadium; Huntington, WV	L 0–40	6,500	
September 30	at Louisville*	Cardinal Stadium; Louisville, KY	L 7–32	3,162	
October 7	at Toledo	Glass Bowl; Toledo, OH	L 6–33	7,800	
October 14	Kent State	Fairfield Stadium; Huntington, WV	W 14–8		
October 21	Morehead State^{†}*	Fairfield Stadium; Huntington, WV	T 0–0		
October 28	at Western Michigan	Waldo Stadium; Kalamazoo, MI	L 0–20	10,500	
November 4	Ohio	Fairfield Stadium; Huntington, WV (rivalry)	L 7–14		
November 11	at Xavier*	Xavier Stadium; Cincinnati, OH	L 2–3	5,103	
November 18	vs. Eastern Kentucky*	Ashland, KY	W 20–0	2,500	
*Non-conference game; ^{†}Homecoming
