= Jerry Carle =

American football, basketball, and baseball player and coach

Biographical details
- Born: July 25, 1923; North St. Paul, Minnesota, U.S.
- Died: April 12, 2014 (aged 90)

Playing career

Football
- 1943: Northwestern
- 1946–1947: Northwestern

Basketball
- 1943–1944: Northwestern
- 1946–1948: Northwestern

Coaching career (HC unless noted)

Football
- 1948–1950: Colorado College (assistant)
- 1954–1956: Iowa State (assistant)
- 1957–1989: Colorado College

Basketball
- 1948–1951: Colorado College
- 1978–1980: Colorado College

Baseball
- 1967: Colorado College

Head coaching record
- Overall: 137–150–5 (football); 49–82 (basketball); 3–14 (baseball)
- Tournaments: 0–1 (NCAA D-III playoffs)

Accomplishments and honors

Championships
- 1 RMC (1958)

Gerald C. Carle (July 25, 1923 – April 12, 2014) was an American college football, college basketball, and college baseball player and coach. He was selected in the 30th round of the 1947 NFL draft by the Green Bay Packers. He served as the head football coach at Colorado College from 1957 to 1989, compiling a record of 137–150–5. He holds the program records for longest tenure, most wins, and most losses. Carle died on April 12, 2014.

== Head coaching record ==
=== Football ===
Year	Team	Overall	Conference	Standing	Bowl/playoffs
Colorado College Tigers (Rocky Mountain Conference) (1957–1962)
1957	Colorado College	3–5	2–3	4th	
1958	Colorado College	6–3	4–1	T–1st	
1959	Colorado College	4–4	2–3	4th	
1960	Colorado College	4–5	1–4	5th	
1961	Colorado College	5–3–1	2–2	T–2nd	
1962	Colorado College	1–7–1	0–4	5th	
Colorado College Tigers (Great Plains College Association / Rocky Mountain Conference) (1963)
1963	Colorado College	4–6	1–2 / 0–4	3rd / 5th	
Colorado College Tigers (Great Plains College Association) (1964)
1964	Colorado College	1–7	0–3	4th	
Colorado College Tigers (NCAA College Division / NCAA Division III independent) (1965–1989)
1965	Colorado College	3–5			
1966	Colorado College	4–4			
1967	Colorado College	2–5–1			
1968	Colorado College	2–6			
1969	Colorado College	6–2			
1970	Colorado College	4–4			
1971	Colorado College	7–1			
1972	Colorado College	8–1			
1973	Colorado College	9–1			
1974	Colorado College	8–1			
1975	Colorado College	7–2–1			L NCAA Division III Quarterfinal
1976	Colorado College	7–1–1			
1977	Colorado College	3–6			
1978	Colorado College	6–3			
1979	Colorado College	4–5			
1980	Colorado College	2–7			
1981	Colorado College	4–5			
1982	Colorado College	5–4			
1983	Colorado College	2–7			
1984	Colorado College	1–8			
1985	Colorado College	1–8			
1986	Colorado College	5–4			
1987	Colorado College	2–7			
1988	Colorado College	4–5			
1989	Colorado College	1–8			
Colorado College:		137–150–5	12–26		
Total:		137–150–5			
National championship Conference title Conference division title or championship game berth
