= Howard Kolstad =

American football player and coach

Biographical details
- Born: March 18, 1914; Eau Claire, Wisconsin, U.S.
- Died: February 19, 1996 (aged 81); De Pere, Wisconsin, U.S.

Playing career
- 1932–1935: Wisconsin–Eau Claire

Coaching career (HC unless noted)
- 1939–1942: Arkansaw HS (WI)
- 1946: Spooner HS (WI)
- 1947–1949: Mondovi HS (WI)
- 1950–1959: Eau Claire Regis HS (WI)
- 1960–1978: St. Norbert

Head coaching record
- Overall: 96–76–5 (college)

Howard L. "Chick" Kolstad (March 18, 1914 – February 19, 1996) was an American football player and coach. He served as the head football coach at St. Norbert College in De Pere, Wisconsin from 1960 to 1978, compiling a record of 96–76–5. The football playing field at St. Norbert is named in his honor. He, along with his brother Robert, played college football at the University of Wisconsin-Eua Claire in 1938-1939.

Kolstad died on February 19, 1996 in De Pere, Wisconsin.
