= Bob Bill =

American football player and businessman

Robert Edmund Bill (March 29, 1940 – June 3, 2012) was an American football player and businessman.

He was born in Mineola, New York and later attended Sacred Heart Academy and graduated from Garden City High School in 1957.

He played football at the University of Notre Dame for three years during the single-platoon era, meaning he played offense, defense and special teams.

He was drafted 26th overall by the New York Giants in the second round of the 1962 NFL draft as a tackle, signing a two-year deal, but he never took the field. He played in the 1962 College All Star Game against the NFL Champion Green Bay Packers, then went to Canton, OH to play in the Giants season opener. His promising professional football career began and ended that day with a knee injury.

He subsequently worked in the commercial insurance industry, and died of heart failure.
