= Mike Lind =

American football player (1940–2002)

No. 38
- Position: Fullback

Personal information
- Born: February 22, 1940; Chicago, Illinois, U.S.
- Died: October 25, 2002 (aged 62); Chicago Heights, Illinois, U.S.
- Listed height: 6 ft 2 in (1.88 m)
- Listed weight: 220 lb (100 kg)

Career information
- High school: Calumet (Chicago)
- College: Notre Dame
- NFL draft: 1962: 5th round, 64th overall pick
- AFL draft: 1962: 19th round, 152nd overall pick

Career history
- San Francisco 49ers (1963–1964); Pittsburgh Steelers (1965–1966)

Career NFL statistics
- Rushing yards: 661
- Rushing average: 3
- Receptions: 52
- Receiving yards: 427
- Total touchdowns: 9
- Stats at Pro Football Reference

Harry Norman Michael Lind (February 22, 1940 – October 25, 2002) was an American professional football player who was a fullback in the National Football League (NFL). He played college football for the Notre Dame Fighting Irish.

== Early life ==
Lind was born and grew up in Chicago, Illinois, and attended Calumet High School. He was named the MVP (most valuable player) of the 1957 Chicago Prep Bowl. As a senior, he was named All-City and the Chicago Sun-Times Player of the Year and rushed for a 62 yard touchdown to help Calumet win Chicago's prep title over Lindblom Technical High School.

== College career ==
Lind was a member of the Notre Dame Fighting Irish for four seasons. As a junior Lind was the team's second-leading rusher with 450 yards and four touchdowns on 87 carries. He was named Notre Dame's team captain going into his senior year, although he missed most of the season due to injuries.

== Professional career ==
Lind was selected in the fifth round of the 1962 NFL Draft by the San Francisco 49ers and by the San Diego Chargers in the 19th round of the 1962 AFL Draft. In his second year, Lind was the 49ers primary fullback, rushing for 256 yards and a team-high seven touchdowns while also catching 25 passes for 178 yards. Lind was traded to the Pittsburgh Steelers shortly before the start of the 1965 season. In his first season with the team, Lind rushed for 375 yards and one touchdown with 25 receptions for 236 yards and one touchdown. He was waived by the Steelers six games into the 1966 season.

== Later life and death ==
After his football career, Lind worked several jobs, including a building trades company. He died of cancer on October 25, 2002.
