= Bobby Smith (running back) =

American football player (born 1942)

- Smith follows Billy Shaw's blocking against the Jets in a 1964 AFL game

No. 20, 37
- Position: Halfback

Personal information
- Born: May 18, 1942 (age 84); Corpus Christi, Texas, U.S.
- Listed height: 6 ft 0 in (1.83 m)
- Listed weight: 203 lb (92 kg)

Career information
- High school: Roy Miller (Corpus Christi)
- College: North Texas (1960-1963)
- NFL draft: 1964: 7th round, 94th overall pick
- AFL draft: 1964: 11th round, 81st overall pick

Career history
- Buffalo Bills (1964-1965); Pittsburgh Steelers (1966)

Awards and highlights
- 2× AFL champion (1964, 1965); AFL All-Star (1965)

Career NFL/AFL statistics
- Rushing yards: 536
- Rushing average: 4.2
- Receptions: 21
- Receiving yards: 214
- Total touchdowns: 5
- Stats at Pro Football Reference

Robert Lee Smith (born May 18, 1942) is an American former professional football player who was a halfback in the American Football League (AFL) and National Football League (NFL).

After playing college football for the North Texas Mean Green, he was selected in 1964 by both the AFL's Buffalo Bills and the NFL's Pittsburgh Steelers. He chose to play for the Bills, and in his rookie season he averaged 4.9 yards per attempt. He won two consecutive AFL championships in 1964 and 1965 with the Bills, before leaving the AFL for the NFL. He joined the Steelers for the 1966 NFL season and played a single season in Pittsburgh.

== See also ==
- List of American Football League players
