= 1961 Panhandle A&M Aggies football team =

American college football season

1961 Panhandle A&M Aggies football

All Sports Bowl, W 28–14 vs. Langston
- Conference: Oklahoma Collegiate Conference
- Record: 9–2 (4–1 OCC)
- Head coach: Oscar Williams (11th season)

1961 Oklahoma Collegiate Conference football standings
	Conf.					Overall
Team	W		L		T	W		L		T
No. 9 Central State (OK) +	6	–	1	–	0	9	–	1	–	0
Langston +	6	–	1	–	0	8	–	2	–	0
No. 11 Panhandle A&M	4	–	1	–	0	9	–	2	–	0
East Central	3	–	4	–	0	5	–	5	–	0
SE Oklahoma State	2	–	4	–	0	4	–	6	–	0
Northeastern State	2	–	4	–	0	3	–	6	–	0
SW Oklahoma State	2	–	5	–	0	2	–	8	–	0
NW Oklahoma State	1	–	6	–	0	1	–	8	–	0
$ – Conference champion; Rankings from NAIA poll

The 1961 Panhandle A&M Aggies football team, sometimes also known as the Plainsmen, was an American football team that represented Panhandle A&M College (now known as Oklahoma Panhandle State University) as a member of the Oklahoma Collegiate Conference (OCC) during the 1961 college football season. In their 11th season under head coach Oscar Williams, the Aggies compiled a 9–2 record (4–1 in conference games), outscored opponents by a total of 315 to 178, and finished in third place in the OCC.

After losing the first two games of the season, the Aggies won nine consecutive games. The winning streak included: (i) a victory over Langston in the inaugural All Sports Bowl; (ii) sa season-high 60 points against New Mexico Western, including 34 points in the second quarter; (iii) a 56–0 victory over otherwise undefeated Peru State, the worste defeat suffered by a Peru State team since 1942.

The team was inducted into the Oklahoma Panhandle State Hall of Fame in 2011.

== Schedule ==
Date	Opponent	Site	Result	Attendance	Source
September 16	at Langston	Guthrie, OK	L 14–33	5,000	
September 23	at Morningside*	Public Schools Stadium; Sioux City, IA	L 7–14		
September 30	New Mexico Western*	Goodwell, OK	W 60–32		
October 7	Adams State*	Goodwell, OK	W 30–7		
October 14	at Northwestern Oklahoma State	Alva, OK	W 17–7		
October 21	at East Central	Norris Stadium; Ada, OK	W 33–32		
October 26	Southwestern Oklahoma State	Goodwell, OK	W 40–0	4,000	
November 4	at Peru State*	Oak Bowl; Peru, NE	W 56–0		
November 11	New Mexico Highlands*	Goodwell, OK	W 31–27		
November 17	at Central State (OK)	Broncho Stadium; Edmond, OK	W 27–26	8,000	
December 9	vs. Langston*	Taft Stadium; Oklahoma City, OK (All Sports Bowl)	W 28–14	8,500	
*Non-conference game

== Statistics ==
Panhandle led the NAIA with 4,688 yards of total offense in ten regular-season games, an average of 468.8 yards per game. The Aggies also set an NAIA single-season record with 3,944 rushing yards in the regular season, an average of 394.4 yards per game. On October 26, the Aggies tallied a season-high 532 rushing yards against Southwestern Oklahoma State.

Tailback Jerry Linton led the nation with 1,356 rushing yards. Linton added another 173 rushing yards in the All Sports Bowl—bringing his 11-game total to 1,529 yards. He was also selected as a first-team player on the NAIA's 1961 All-America team.

Fullback Tony Pontillo, sometimes referred to as Tony "the Tank", ranked second on the team in rushing with 1,149 rushing yards. He also led the OCC in scoring with 90 points on 15 touchdowns in the regular season. Pontillo added another 12 points in the All Sports Bowl to raise his season total to 102 points.
