= 1961 Wheaton Crusaders football team =

American college football season

1961 Wheaton Crusaders football
- Conference: Independent
- Record: 8–0
- Head coach: Jack Swartz (1st season)
- Captain: Dave Iha
- Home stadium: McCully Field

1961 NAIA independents football records
	Conf.			Overall
Team	W	L	T	W		L		T
No. 2 Baldwin–Wallace		–		9	–	0	–	0
No. 8 Tampa		–		8	–	1	–	0
Westminster (UT)		–		7	–	1	–	1
Earlham		–		7	–	1	–	0
Oklahoma Panhandle State		–		9	–	2	–	0
La Verne		–		7	–	2	–	0
Hillsdale		–		6	–	3	–	0
Eastern New Mexico		–		6	–	4	–	0
McMurry		–		6	–	4	–	0
St. Mary of the Plains		–		4	–	5	–	0
Georgetown (KY)		–		2	–	3	–	1
Austin		–		2	–	7	–	0
Rankings from NAIA poll

The 1961 Wheaton Crusaders football team was an American football team that represented Wheaton College as an independent during the 1961 college football season. In their first year under head coach Jack Swartz, the Crusaders compiled a perfect 8–0 record and outscored opponents by a total of 217 to 37.

Tackle Dave "The Bear" Kemna played on both offense and defense and was selected as a second-team player on the 1961 Little All-America college football team. Dave Iha was a co-captain and was selected as the team's most valuable player.

The team played its home games at McCully Field in Wheaton, Illinois.

== Schedule ==
Date	Opponent	Site	Result	Attendance	Source
September 16	Valparaiso	McCully Field; Wheaton, IL	W 35–13		
September 23	at Northern Illinois	Glidden Field; DeKalb, IL	W 7–2	3,600	
September 30	at Hope	Riverview Park; Holland, MI	W 20–0	2,500	
October 7	at Wayne State (MI)	Tartar Field; Detroit, MI	W 57–0		
October 14	Bradley	McCully Field; Wheaton, IL	W 29–8		
October 21	at North Central (IL)	Naperville, IL (Little Brass Bell)	W 20–7	7,500	
October 28	at Washington University	Francis Field; St. Louis, MO	W 22–0		
November 4	Carroll (WI)	McCully Field; Wheaton, IL	W 27–7		
