= 1961 Hillsdale Dales football team =

American college football season

1961 Hillsdale Dales football
- Conference: Independent
- Record: 6–3
- Head coach: Muddy Waters (8th season)

1961 NAIA independents football records
	Conf.			Overall
Team	W	L	T	W		L		T
No. 2 Baldwin–Wallace		–		9	–	0	–	0
No. 8 Tampa		–		8	–	1	–	0
Westminster (UT)		–		7	–	1	–	1
Earlham		–		7	–	1	–	0
Oklahoma Panhandle State		–		9	–	2	–	0
La Verne		–		7	–	2	–	0
Hillsdale		–		6	–	3	–	0
Eastern New Mexico		–		6	–	4	–	0
McMurry		–		6	–	4	–	0
St. Mary of the Plains		–		4	–	5	–	0
Georgetown (KY)		–		2	–	3	–	1
Austin		–		2	–	7	–	0
Rankings from NAIA poll

The 1961 Hillsdale Dales football team was an American football team that represented Hillsdale College as an independent member of the National Association of Intercollegiate Athletics during the 1961 college football season. In their eighth year under head coach Muddy Waters, the Dales compiled a 6–3 record.

Hillsdale appeared in the Mineral Water Bowl after the 1960 season and was suspended by the Michigan Intercollegiate Athletic Association (MIAA) for breaking the conference prohibition on post-season competition. Hillsdale refused to accept the suspension and withdrew from the conference, competing as an independent in 1961.

== Schedule ==
Date	Opponent	Rank	Site	Result	Attendance	Source
September 16	at Saint Joseph's (IN)		Rensselaer, IN	W 28–7		
September 23	St. Benedict's		Atwood Stadium; Flint, MI	W 20–0		
October 7	at No. 8 Northern Michigan	No. 2	Memorial Stadium; Marquette, MI	L 3–24	5,500	
October 14	at Ferris Institute		Big Rapids, MI	W 13–0	4,200	
October 21	No. 2 Baldwin–Wallace		Hillsdale, MI	L 7–16	4,500	
October 28	Youngstown		Hillsdale, MI	W 30–0		
November 4	at Central Michigan		Alumni Field; Mount Pleasant, MI	L 10–13	5,000	
November 11	Fairmount State		Hillsdale, MI	W 56–6		
November 18	Heidelberg		Hillsdale, MI	W 21–7		
Rankings from AP Poll released prior to the game
