= 1961 Baldwin–Wallace Yellow Jackets football team =

American college football season

1961 Baldwin–Wallace Yellow Jackets football
- Conference: Independent
- Record: 9–0
- Head coach: Lee Tressel (4th season)
- Home stadium: Ray E. Watts Stadium

1961 NAIA independents football records
	Conf.			Overall
Team	W	L	T	W		L		T
No. 2 Baldwin–Wallace		–		9	–	0	–	0
No. 8 Tampa		–		8	–	1	–	0
Westminster (UT)		–		7	–	1	–	1
Earlham		–		7	–	1	–	0
Oklahoma Panhandle State		–		9	–	2	–	0
La Verne		–		7	–	2	–	0
Hillsdale		–		6	–	3	–	0
Eastern New Mexico		–		6	–	4	–	0
McMurry		–		6	–	4	–	0
St. Mary of the Plains		–		4	–	5	–	0
Georgetown (KY)		–		2	–	3	–	1
Austin		–		2	–	7	–	0
Rankings from NAIA poll

The 1961 Baldwin–Wallace Yellow Jackets football team was an American football team that represented Baldwin–Wallace University as an independent during the 1961 college football season. In their fourth year under head coach Lee Tressel, the Yellow Jackets compiled a 9–0 record and outscored opponents by a total of 204 to 55. They were the only Ohio football team to complete a perfect season in 1961 and were ranked No. 2 in both the UPI and AP small college football rankings. Baldwin–Wallace played home games at Ray E. Watts Stadium in Berea, Ohio.

The team was the first in Baldwin-Wallace football history to complete a perfect season. In a poll of Ohio coaches, Lee Tressel was selected as the 1961 Ohio College Football Coach of the Year. Tressel remained at Baldwin-Wallace until 1980 and was later inducted into the College Football Hall of Fame. The 1961 team remained Tressel's only team to complete an undefeated, untied season.

== Schedule ==
Date	Time	Opponent	Rank	Site	Result	Attendance	Source
September 23	8:00 p.m.	Quantico Marines		Ray E. Watts Stadium; Berea, OH	W 18–7	7,525	
September 30	8:00 p.m.	Muskingum		Ray E. Watts Stadium; Berea, OH	W 35–6	8,500	
October 7		Youngstown		Ray E. Watts Stadium; Berea, OH	W 40–0	7,500	
October 13		at Eastern Michigan	No. 7	Briggs Field; Ypsilanti, MI	W 27–14	1,500	
October 21		at Hillsdale	No. 2	Hillsdale, MI	W 16–7	4,500	
October 28		vs. Akron	No. 3	Clifford Stadium; Cuyahoga Falls, OH	W 7–0	6,513–6,531	
November 4		Heidelberg	No. 2	Ray E. Watts Stadium; Berea, OH	W 33–7	7,500–8,300	
November 11		at Findlay	No. 2	Findlay, OH	W 14–6	6,000	
November 18		at Kent State	No. 2	Memorial Stadium; Kent, OH	W 14–6	3,500–6,437	
Rankings from AP Poll released prior to the game; All times are in Eastern time

== Statistics ==
The Yellow Jackets out-gained their opponents by 2,778 yards (308.6 yards per game) to 1,655 yards (183.8 yards per game). In rushing yardage, they more than doubled their opponents' total, gaining 1,776 rushing yards (197.3 per game) to 826 yards (91.7 per game) for opponents.

Halfback Gary Stoufer was the team's rushing leader, tallying 629 yards on 151 carries (4.2 yards per carry). Stoufer also led the team in scoring with 48 points on eight touchdowns. Halfback Bill Ridge added 335 yards on 72 carries (4.7 yards per carry).

The team's passing leaders were quarterbacks Tom French (28-for-55, .509 percentage, 529 yards, three touchdowns, three interceptions) and Bill Lacey (24-for-38, .632 percentage, 255 yards, two touchdowns, two interceptions).

The receiving leaders were end Bill Eyerdom (19 receptions for 369 yards, 19.4-yard average, and four touchdowns) and halfback Bill Ridge (eight receptions for 146 yards, 18.2-yard average, and one touchdown).
