= 1961 Earlham Quakers football team =

American college football season

1961 Earlham Quakers football
- Conference: Independent
- Record: 7–1
- Head coach: Jerry Huntsman (1st season)
- Home stadium: Reid Field

1961 NAIA independents football records
	Conf.			Overall
Team	W	L	T	W		L		T
No. 2 Baldwin–Wallace		–		9	–	0	–	0
No. 8 Tampa		–		8	–	1	–	0
Westminster (UT)		–		7	–	1	–	1
Earlham		–		7	–	1	–	0
Oklahoma Panhandle State		–		9	–	2	–	0
La Verne		–		7	–	2	–	0
Hillsdale		–		6	–	3	–	0
Eastern New Mexico		–		6	–	4	–	0
McMurry		–		6	–	4	–	0
St. Mary of the Plains		–		4	–	5	–	0
Georgetown (KY)		–		2	–	3	–	1
Austin		–		2	–	7	–	0
Rankings from NAIA poll

The 1961 Earlham Quakers football team was an American football team that represented Earlham College of Richmond, Indiana, as an independent team during the 1961 college football season. In their first season under head coach Jerry Huntsman, the Quakers compiled a 7–1 record, shut out four of eight opponents, and outscored all opponents by a total of 271 to 81.

The Taylor game ended on the field as a 21–7 loss. The College Football Data Warehouse web site reported that Earlham was awarded the game due to a forfeiture by Tayor, though no contemporaneous sourcing has been found to verify the forfeiture.

Stanley Hall and Ray Mitrione were assistant coaches for the team. The team played home games at Reid Field in Richmond, Indiana.

== Schedule ==
Date	Opponent	Site	Result	Attendance	Source
September 23	at Principia	Elsah, IL	W 16–14		
September 30	at Taylor	Upland, IN	L 7–21	2,000	
October 7	Elmhust	Reid Field; Richmond, IN	W 53–0		
October 14	Franklin (IN)	Reid Field; Richmond, IN	W 34–32		
October 21	Manchester (IN)^{†}	Reid Field; Richmond, IN	W 39–14	2,500	
October 28	at Rose Poly	Terre Haute, IN	W 80–0		
November 4	at Wilmington (OH)	Wilmington, OH	W 26–0		
November 11	Indiana Central	Reid Field; Richmond, IN	W 16–0	2,500	
^{†}Homecoming
