= St. Mary of the Plains College =

Private college in Dodge City, Kansas, US (1913–1992)

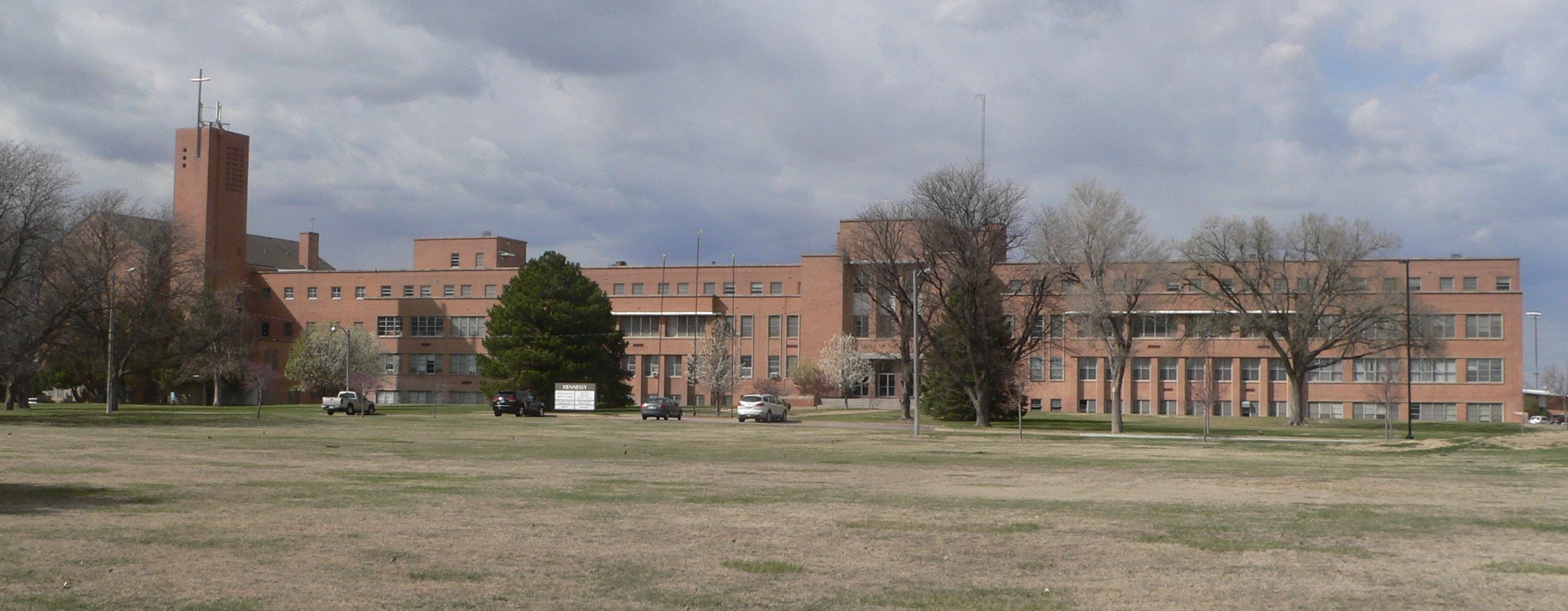
- Former Hennessy Hall (2015)
- Former name: Soule College
- Active: 1913–1992
- Founder: John Hennessy
- Affiliations: Roman Catholic Diocese of Dodge City
- Religious affiliation: Roman Catholic
- Location: Dodge City, Kansas; 37°46′35″N 100°0′40″W
- Nickname: Cavaliers
- Sporting affiliations: Kansas Collegiate Athletic Conference

St. Mary of the Plains College was a four-year liberal arts college in Dodge City, Kansas, United States that closed in 1992. It was located on the north side of Dodge City, next to Highway 50.

== History ==
=== Soule College ===
The roots of St. Mary of the Plains can be found in Soule College, which opened in 1888 to a gala celebration. Hopes for higher education in western Kansas were dashed by the economic depression of the 1890s. Unable to get the college off the ground, in 1903 the Presbyterians sold the institution to the Methodist Church. The Methodists had no better luck. The college was closed and the property put up for sale.

=== Re-opening ===
In 1912, John Hennessy, then Bishop of Wichita, visited Dodge City and viewed the defunct campus of Soule College. Thinking that the campus would make an appropriate Catholic boarding school for young girls, Hennessy purchased the land and buildings for $8,500. In 1913 Bishop Hennessy brought the Sisters of St. Joseph to Dodge City in order to operate a Catholic academy for day students and boarding students. Bishop Hennessy chose the name “St. Mary of the Plains Academy” and officially opened the school in September 1913. The academy was a boarding school for both grade school and high school students and also accepted day students through 1917.

Operating a boarding school in Western Kansas, where the population was sparse, was never easy, but the academy struggled on and survived through the Great Depression. On May 10, 1942, however, disaster struck. A tornado blew through the campus and destroyed the buildings. There were no human casualties, but the buildings were beyond repair.

=== New construction ===
With new construction materials severely rationed due to U.S. involvement in World War II, the Sisters of St. Joseph were unable to rebuild. The sisters were undaunted, and encouraged by Bishop Christian Winkelmann of Wichita, fundraising for a new campus proceeded. With new buildings, however, the sisters promised that the new campus would be an institution of higher education, serving both high school and college students. The groundbreaking ceremonies took place in September 1950 with a goal of construction being completed in two years.

In September 1952, the exterior of the new main building, Hennessy Hall, was completed. Although work remained to be done on the interior, classes began on schedule and on September 15, 1952, St. Mary of the Plains began operation as a high school and two-year college. By 1954, the college became a four-year institution.

The motto of St. Mary of the Plains College was, Sapientia Caritas Prudentia (Wisdom, Charity, Prudence). The college was accredited in 1963 by The Higher Learning Commission and in 1968 became a member of the Kansas Collegiate Athletic Conference. Due to expanding enrollments, the college expanded dramatically and added four dormitory buildings in the late 1960s. In 1969, with accreditation and expanding college enrollment, the high school closed.

=== Population decline ===
Enrollment declined again after the 1970s, and with a corresponding decline of population in Western Kansas, St. Mary of the Plains simply could not maintain its operations. Without a large endowment to sustain itself, in 1992 St. Mary of the Plains was forced to permanently close its doors. The campus buildings were leased to the city of Dodge City, and in the late 1990s several were sold off.

== Athletics ==
The St. Mary of the Plains athletic teams were called the Cavaliers and Saints. The college was a member of the National Association of Intercollegiate Athletics (NAIA), primarily competing in the Kansas Collegiate Athletic Conference (KCAC) from 1968–69 to 1991–92. The high school teams were known as the St. Mary of the Plains Crusaders.

=== Football ===
As of 2025, the school still holds the NAIA football single-season record for fewest points allowed per game at 1.3 (13 points in 10 games in the 1989 season).

== Notable alumni ==
- Gerald Govan, retired ABA player
- Don Dee (1943–2014), retired ABA player
- Danny Nee, retired American Basketball Coach of the University of Nebraska–Lincoln
- Bradley Ralph, attorney and member of the Kansas House of Representatives

== Records location ==
Campus and alumni records for St. Mary of the Plains College are housed today at Kansas Wesleyan University in Salina.

== See also ==
- List of defunct colleges and universities in Kansas
