= 1955 Dayton Flyers football team =

American college football season

1955 Dayton Flyers football
- Conference: Independent
- Record: 3–6–1
- Head coach: Hugh Devore (2nd season)
- Home stadium: UD Stadium

1955 Midwestern college football independents records
	Conf.			Overall
Team	W	L	T	W		L		T
Ferris Institute		–		6	–	1	–	0
No. 9 Notre Dame		–		8	–	2	–	0
Xavier		–		7	–	2	–	0
Carthage		–		6	–	2	–	0
Wabash		–		5	–	3	–	1
Michigan Tech		–		4	–	3	–	0
Washington University		–		5	–	4	–	0
Drake		–		4	–	4	–	0
Youngstown		–		4	–	5	–	0
Dayton		–		3	–	6	–	0
Marquette		–		2	–	6	–	1
Baldwin–Wallace		–		2	–	6	–	0
Cincinnati		–		1	–	6	–	2
Rose Poly		–		1	–	6	–	1
Northern Michigan		–		0	–	7	–	0
Rankings from AP Poll

The 1955 Dayton Flyers football team represented the University of Dayton as an independent during the 1955 college football season. In their second season under head coach Hugh Devore, the Flyers compiled a 3–6–1 record. Dayton played their home games at UD Stadium in Dayton, Ohio.

== Schedule ==
Date	Opponent	Site	Result	Attendance	Source
September 24	at Cincinnati	Nippert Stadium; Cincinnati, OH	W 15–14	25,000	
October 1	Kent State	UD Stadium; Dayton, OH	W 26–13	10,000	
October 8	at Louisville	Parkway Field; Louisville, KY	L 7–19		
October 15	Xavier	UD Stadium; Dayton, OH	L 6–12	11,000	
October 22	at Tennessee	Shields–Watkins Field; Knoxville, TN	L 7–53		
October 29	Chattanooga	UD Stadium; Dayton, OH	T 7–7	7,158	
November 6	at Holy Cross	Fitton Field; Worcester, MA	L 7–13	17,000	
November 12	No. 15 Miami (OH)	UD Stadium; Dayton, OH	L 0–21	11,932	
November 19	at Mississippi Southern	Mississippi Veterans Memorial Stadium; Jackson, MS	L 13–19	6,500	
November 27	Villanova	UD Stadium; Dayton, OH	W 19–7	6,450	
Rankings from AP Poll released prior to the game; Source:
