= Paul Selge =

American football player and coach (1921–2016)

Biographical details
- Born: August 4, 1921; South Bend, Indiana, U.S.
- Died: April 20, 2016 (aged 94); Plainfield, Indiana, U.S.

Playing career

Football
- 1939–1942: Indiana State

Basketball
- 1939–1943: Indiana State

Coaching career (HC unless noted)

Football
- 1955: Indiana State

Head coaching record
- Overall: 2–7

Paul Earnest Selge (August 4, 1921 – April 20, 2016) was an American football player and coach. He served as the head football coach at Indiana State University in Terre Haute, Indiana in 1955, compiling a record of 2–7. He was a star football and basketball player at Indiana State as a student from 1939 until 1943.

== Head coaching record ==
Year	Team	Overall	Conference	Standing	Bowl/playoffs
Indiana State Sycamores (Indiana Collegiate Conference) (1955)
1955	Indiana State	2–7	1–5	T–6th	
Indiana State:		2–7	1–5		
Total:		2–7			
