= 1955 Indiana State Sycamores football team =

American college football season

1955 Indiana State Sycamores football
- Conference: Indiana Collegiate Conference
- Record: 2–7 (1–5 ICC)
- Head coach: Paul Selge (1st season)
- Home stadium: Memorial Stadium

1955 Indiana Collegiate Conference football standings
	Conf.					Overall
Team	W		L		T	W		L		T
Evansville +	5	–	1	–	0	6	–	3	–	0
Saint Joseph's (IN) +	5	–	1	–	0	6	–	3	–	0
Valparaiso	4	–	2	–	0	5	–	4	–	0
Butler	3	–	3	–	0	3	–	5	–	0
DePauw	2	–	4	–	0	5	–	4	–	0
Ball State	1	–	5	–	0	3	–	5	–	0
Indiana State	1	–	5	–	0	2	–	6	–	0
+ – Conference co-champions

The 1955 Indiana State Sycamores football team represented Indiana State Teachers College—now known as Indiana State University—as a member of the Indiana Collegiate Conference (ICC) during the 1955 college football season. Led by Paul Selge in his first and only season as head coach, the Sycamores compiled an overall record of 2–7 with a mark of 1–5 in conference play, tying for sixth place in the ICC.

== Schedule ==
Date	Time	Opponent	Site	Result	Attendance	Source
September 17	2:00 p.m.	at Franklin (IN)*	Goodell Field; Franklin, IN	W 26–7		
September 24	8:00 p.m.	at Valparaiso	Bouchers Field; Valparaiso, IN	L 9–27	4,000	
October 1	2:00 p.m.	Butler^{†}	Memorial Stadium; Terre Haute, IN	L 19–26	3,000	
October 8	1:30 p.m.	Saint Joseph's (IN)	Memorial Stadium; Terre Haute, IN	L 0–27		
October 15	1:00 p.m.	at Ball State	Ball State Field; Muncie, IN (Blue Key Victory Bell)	L 6–19	10,000	
October 22		at Eastern Illinois*	Lincoln Field; Charleston, IL	L 13–33		
October 29	1:30 p.m.	Evansville	Memorial Stadium; Terre Haute, IN	L 19–33		
November 5	1:30 p.m.	DePauw	Memorial Stadium; Terre Haute, IN	W 14–6		
November 12	1:30 p.m.	Hanover*	Memorial Stadium; Terre Haute, IN	L 6–20		
*Non-conference game; ^{†}Homecoming; All times are in Central time
