= Norm Amundsen =

American football player and coach (born 1932)

No. 62
- Position: Guard

Personal information
- Born: September 28, 1932 (age 94); Chicago, Illinois, U.S.
- Listed height: 5 ft 11 in (1.80 m)
- Listed weight: 245 lb (111 kg)

Career information
- High school: Kelvyn Park (Chicago)
- College: Wisconsin (1951–1954)
- NFL draft: 1955: 6th round, 65th overall pick

Career history

Playing
- Green Bay Packers (1957)

Coaching
- Austin HS (IL) (1958) Line coach; Coe (1959–1961) Line coach; Beloit (1962–1967) Head coach; Valparaiso (1968–1976) Head coach

Operations
- Valparaiso (1975–1979) Athletic director

Career NFL statistics
- Games played: 12
- Stats at Pro Football Reference

Head coaching record
- Career: 67–63–5 (.515)

Norman Robert Amundsen (born September 28, 1932) is an American former professional football player and coach and college athletics administrator. He played college football for the Wisconsin Badgers and professionally as a guard for the Green Bay Packers of the National Football League (NFL). Amundsen served as the head football coach at Beloit College from 1962 to 1967 and Valparaiso University from 1968 to 1976. He was also the athletic director at Valparaiso from 1975 to 1979.

== Career ==
Amundsen was selected 65th overall by the Green Bay Packers in the sixth round of the 1955 NFL draft and later played with the team during the 1957 NFL season. He played collegiately at the University of Wisconsin–Madison.

== Head coaching record ==
Year	Team	Overall	Conference	Standing	Bowl/playoffs
Beloit Buccaneers (Midwest Conference) (1962–1967)
1962	Beloit	1–7	1–7	9th	
1963	Beloit	3–3–2	3–3–2	T–5th	
1964	Beloit	5–3	5–3	T–4th	
1965	Beloit	5–3	5–3	T–3rd	
1966	Beloit	5–3	5–3	4th	
1967	Beloit	4–4	4–4	T–4th	
Beloit:		23–23–2	23–23–2		
Valparaiso Crusaders (Indiana Collegiate Conference) (1968–1976)
1968	Valparaiso	4–5	4–0	1st	
1969	Valparaiso	7–2	3–1	T–1st	
1970	Valparaiso	5–3–2	1–3	4th	
1971	Valparaiso	8–2	3–1	2nd	
1972	Valparaiso	6–4	2–3	T–4th	
1973	Valparaiso	6–5	2–3	T–4th	
1974	Valparaiso	3–6	2–4	T–4th	
1975	Valparaiso	3–6	2–4	T–4th	
1976	Valparaiso	2–7–1	2–3	T–4th	
Valparaiso:		44–40–3	21–22		
Total:		67–63–5			
National championship Conference title Conference division title or championship game berth
