= Edwin R. Snavely =

American sports coach (1912–1964)

Biographical details
- Born: March 5, 1912; Martinsville, Illinois, U.S.
- Died: January 20, 1964 (aged 51); Greencastle, Indiana, U.S.

Playing career

Football
- 1931: Illinois
- Position: Fullback

Coaching career (HC unless noted)

Football
- 1937–1938: Moravian
- 1939–1941: East Stroudsburg
- 1947–1955: DePauw

Basketball
- 1937–1939: Moravian

Tennis
- 1950–1963: DePauw

Wrestling
- 1957: DePauw

Administrative career (AD unless noted)
- 1937–1939: Moravian

Head coaching record
- Overall: 49–61–3 (football); 14–22 (basketball)

Edwin Russell "Mike" Snavely (March 5, 1912 – January 20, 1964) was an American football, basketball, tennis, and wrestling coach. He served as the head football coach at Moravian College from 1937 to 1938, East Stroudsburg State Teachers College—now known as East Stroudsburg University of Pennsylvania—from 1939 to 1941, and DePauw University from 1947 to 1955, compiling a career college football coaching record of 49–61–3. Snavely was also the head basketball coach at Moravian from 1937 to 1939, tallying mark of 14–22.

== Head coaching record ==
=== Football ===
Year	Team	Overall	Conference	Standing	Bowl/playoffs
Moravian Greyhounds (Independent) (1937–1938)
1937	Moravian	2–5–1			
1938	Moravian	3–6			
Moravian:		5–11–1			
East Stroudsburg Warriors (Pennsylvania State Teachers College Conference) (1939–1941)
1939	East Stroudsburg	3–5	3–2	T–6th	
1940	East Stroudsburg	7–1	4–1	4th	
1941	East Stroudsburg	5–2	3–2	6th	
East Stroudsburg:		15–8	10–5		
DePauw Tigers (Independent) (1947–1952)
1947	DePauw	2–6			
1948	DePauw	6–2			
1949	DePauw	1–7			
1950	DePauw	4–4			
1951	DePauw	7–1			
1952	DePauw	4–4			
DePauw Tigers (Indiana Collegiate Conference) (1953–1955)
1953	DePauw	0–7–1	0–5	T–6th	
1954	DePauw	0–7–1	0–5	7th	
1955	DePauw	5–4	2–4	5th	
DePauw:		29–42–2	2–14		
Total:		49–61–3			
