= 1955 DePauw Tigers football team =

American college football season

1955 DePauw Tigers football
- Conference: Indiana Collegiate Conference
- Record: 5–4 (2–4 ICC)
- Head coach: Edwin R. Snavely (9th season)

1955 Indiana Collegiate Conference football standings
	Conf.					Overall
Team	W		L		T	W		L		T
Evansville +	5	–	1	–	0	6	–	3	–	0
Saint Joseph's (IN) +	5	–	1	–	0	6	–	3	–	0
Valparaiso	4	–	2	–	0	5	–	4	–	0
Butler	3	–	3	–	0	3	–	5	–	0
DePauw	2	–	4	–	0	5	–	4	–	0
Ball State	1	–	5	–	0	3	–	5	–	0
Indiana State	1	–	5	–	0	2	–	6	–	0
+ – Conference co-champions

The 1955 DePauw Tigers football team represented DePauw University as a member of the Indiana Collegiate Conference (ICC) during the 1955 college football season. Led by Edwin R. Snavely in his ninth and final season as head coach, the Tigers compiled an overall record of 5–4 with a mark of 2–4 in conference play, placing fifth in the ICC.

== Schedule ==
Date	Time	Opponent	Site	Result	Attendance	Source
September 17	8:00 p.m.	at Evansville	Reitz Bowl; Evansville, IN	L 7–39	5,000	
September 24		Saint Joseph's (IN)	Greencastle, IN	L 13–27		
October 1	1:30 p.m.	Ball State	Greencastle, IN	W 19–6		
October 8		Oberlin*^{†}	Greencastle, IN	W 41–13	4,000	
October 15	1:30 p.m.	at Valparaiso	Brown Field; Valparaiso, IN	W 40–20	6,000	
October 22	2:00 p.m.	at Butler	Butler Bowl; Indianapolis, IN	L 7–18	5,269	
October 22		at Eastern Illinois*	Lincoln Field; Charleston, IL	L 13–33		
October 29		Beloit*	Greencastle, IN	W 19–12		
November 5	1:30 p.m.	at Indiana State	Memorial Stadium; Terre Haute, IN	L 6–14		
November 12		Wabash*	Greencastle, IN (Monon Bell)	W 23–20	4,000	
*Non-conference game; ^{†}Homecoming; All times are in Central time
