= List of Ball State Cardinals men's basketball seasons =

The Ball State Cardinals men's basketball team is the intercollegiate men's basketball team representing Ball State University. The Cardinals have been competing in men's basketball since the 1920–21 season. The results for each season are listed below, with MAC conference results beginning in 1975 listed in parentheses next to the overall record.

== List of seasons ==
Season	Coach	Result
1920–21	Frank V. Graham	1–4
1921–22	Paul "Billy" Williams	6–7
1922–23	Paul "Billy" Williams	9–6–1
1923–24	Paul "Billy" Williams	4–9
1924–25	Paul "Billy" Williams	8–7
1925–26	Paul B. Parker	8–9
1926–27	Paul B. Parker	13–5
1927–28	Paul B. Parker	17–7
1928–29	Paul B. Parker	8–8
1929–30	Paul B. Parker & Paul "Billy" Williams	9–5
1930–31	Branch McCracken	9–5
1931–32	Branch McCracken	9–7
1932–33	Branch McCracken	7–9
1933–34	Branch McCracken	9–10
1934–35	Branch McCracken	9–9
1935–36	Branch McCracken	13–7
1936–37	Branch McCracken	13–6
1937–38	Branch McCracken	17–4
1938–39	Pete Phillips	10–10
1939–40	Pete Phillips	12–6
1940–41	Pete Phillips	8–9
1941–42	Pete Phillips	7–11
1942–43	Pete Phillips	7–10
1943–44	No games played	0–0
1944–45	Pete Phillips	10–3
1945–46	Pete Phillips	7–9
1946–47	Pete Phillips	9–8
1947–48	Pete Phillips	12–5
1948–49	Dick Steally	12–6
1949–50	Dick Steally	9–9
1950–51	Dick Steally	8–12
1951–52	Dick Steally	7–15
1952–53	Bob Primmer	11–11
1953–54	Bob Primmer	9–12
1954–55	Jim Hinga	8–12
1955–56	Jim Hinga	10–14
1956–57	Jm Hinga	19–8
1957–58	Jim Hinga	13–11
1958–59	Jim Hinga	7–15
1959–60	Jim Hinga	5–17
1960–61	Jim Hinga	12–11
1961–62	Jim Hinga	12–10
1962–63	JIm Hinga	15–9
1963–64	Jim Hinga	17–8
1964–65	Jim Hinga	9–13
1965–66	Jim Hinga	10–15
1966–67	Jim Hinga	7–14
1967–68	Jim Hinga	10–12
1968–69	Bud Getchell	7–16
1969–70	Bud Getchell	8–16
1970–71	Bud Getchell	6–20
1971–72	Bud Getchell	9–15
1972–73	Jim Holstein	9–15
1973–74	Jim Holstein	14–12
1974–75	Jim Holstein	10–15
1975–76	Jim Holstein	11–14 (5–11)
1976–77	Jim Holstein	11–14 (7–9)
1977–78	Steve Yoder	10–15 (6–10)
1978–79	Steve Yoder	16–11 (9–7)
1979–80	Steve Yoder	14–15 (7–9)
1980–81	Steve Yoder	20–10 (10–6)
1981–82	Steve Yoder	17–11 (12–4)
1982–83	Al Brown	17–12 (10–8)
1983–84	Al Brown	8–19 (5–13)
1984–85	Al Brown	13–16 (8–10)
1985–86	Al Brown	21–10 (11–7)
1986–87	Al Brown	9–18 (4–12)
1987–88	Rick Majerus	14–14 (8–8)
1988–89	Rick Majerus	29–3 (14–2)
1989–90	Dick Hunsaker	26–7 (13–3)
1990–91	Dick Hunsaker	21–10 (10–6)
1991–92	Dick Hunsaker	24–9 (11–5)
1992–93	Dick Hunsaker	26–8 (14–4)
1993–94	Ray McCallum	16–12 (11–7)
1994–95	Ray McCallum	19–11 (11–7)
1995–96	Ray McCallum	16–12 (11–7)
1996–97	Ray McCallum	16–13 (9–9)
1997–98	Ray McCallum	21–8 (14–4)
1998–99	Ray McCallum	16–11 (10–8)
1999–2000	Ray McCallum	22–9 (11–7)
2000–01	Tim Buckley	18–12 (11–7)
2001–02	Tim Buckley	23–12 (12–6)
2002–03	Tim Buckley	13–17 (8–10)
2003–04	Tim Buckley	14–15 (10–8)
2004–05	Tim Buckley	15–13 (10–8)
2005–06	Tim Buckley	10–18 (6–12)
2006–07	Ronny Thompson	9–22 (5–11)
2007–08	Billy Taylor	6–24 (5–11)
2008–09	Billy Taylor	14–17 (7–9)
2009–10	Billy Taylor	15–15 (8–8)
2010–11	Billy Taylor	19–13 (10–6)
2011–12	Billy Taylor	15–15 (6–10)
2012–13	Billy Taylor	15–15 (8–8)
2013–14	James Whitford	5–25 (2–16)
2014–15	James Whitford	7–23 (2–16)
2015–16	James Whitford	21–14 (10–8)
2016–17	James Whitford	21–13 (11–7)
2017–18	James Whitford	19–13 (10–8)
2018–19	James Whitford	16–17 (6–12)
2019–20	James Whitford	18–13 (11–7)
2020–21	James Whitford	10–13 (8–9)
2021–22	James Whitford	14–17 (9–10)
2022–23	Michael "Jasper Boy" Lewis	20–12 (11–7)
2023–24	Michael Lewis	15–16 (7–11)
2024–25	Michael Lewis	14–17 (7–11)
2025–26	Michael Lewis	12–19 (7–11)
