= Jauron =

Jauron is a surname. Notable people with the surname include:

- Bob Jauron (1919–2010), American football player and coach
- Dick Jauron (1950–2025), American football player and coach, son of Bob
