= Paul Beck =

Paul Beck may refer to:

- Paul W. Beck (1876–1922), United States Army officer and aviation pioneer
- Paul Beck (American football) (1905–1978), American football and basketball coach
- Jason Archer and Paul Beck, American music video directors and animators
- Paul Beck (detective), fictional character created by M. McDonnell Bodkin

== See also ==
- Paul Beck Goddard (c. 1811–1866), American physician and editor of medical books
- Paul Peck (1889–1912), early U.S. aviator
