= List of Ball State Cardinals men's basketball head coaches =

The following is a list of Ball State Cardinals men's basketball head coaches. The Cardinals have had 20 coaches in their 102-season history.

Ball State's current head coach is Michael Lewis. He was hired in March 2022 to replace James Whitford, who was fired by Ball State at the end of the 2021–22 season.

| No. | Tenure | Coach | Years | Record | Pct. |
|---|---|---|---|---|---|
| 1 | 1920–1921 | Frank Graham | 1 | 1–4 | .200 |
| 2 | 1921–1925; 1929–1930 (Note: Billy Williams and Paul B. Parker served as co-head coaches for the 1929–30 season. The team finished 9–5; both coaches are credited with wins and losses from this season.) | Billy Williams | 6 | 36–34–1 | .514 |
| 3 | 1925–1930 | Paul B. Parker | 5 | 55–34 | .618 |
| 4 | 1930–1938 | Branch McCracken | 8 | 86–57 | .601 |
| 5 | 1938–1948 (Note: Ball State did not field a team for the 1943–44 season) | Pete Phillips | 9 | 82–71 | .536 |
| 6 | 1948–1952 | Dick Stealy | 4 | 36–42 | .462 |
| 7 | 1952–1954 | Bob Primmer | 2 | 20–23 | .465 |
| 8 | 1954–1968 | Jim Hinga | 14 | 154–169 | .477 |
| 9 | 1968–1972 | Bud Getchell | 4 | 30–67 | .309 |
| 10 | 1972–1977 | Jim Holstein | 5 | 55–70 | .440 |
| 11 | 1977–1982 | Steve Yoder | 5 | 77–62 | .554 |
| 12 | 1982–1987 | Al Brown | 5 | 68–75 | .476 |
| 13 | 1987–1989 | Rick Majerus | 2 | 43–17 | .717 |
| 14 | 1989–1993 | Dick Hunsaker | 4 | 97–34 | .740 |
| 15 | 1993–2000 | Ray McCallum | 7 | 126–76 | .624 |
| 16 | 2000–2006 | Tim Buckley | 6 | 93–87 | .517 |
| 17 | 2006–2007 | Ronny Thompson | 1 | 9–22 | .290 |
| 18 | 2007–2013 | Billy Taylor | 6 | 84–99 | .459 |
| 19 | 2013–2022 | James Whitford | 9 | 131–148 | .470 |
| 20 | 2022–present | Michael Lewis | 1 | 20–12 | .625 |
| Totals | | 20 coaches | 102 seasons | 1,294–1,198–1 | .519 |
Records updated through end of 2022–23 season Source
