= 1955 Southern Illinois Salukis football team =

American college football season

1955 Southern Illinois Salukis football
- Conference: Interstate Intercollegiate Athletic Conference
- Record: 4–4–2 (4–1–1 IIAC)
- Head coach: Albert Kawal (1st season)
- Home stadium: McAndrew Stadium

1955 Interstate Intercollegiate Athletic Conference football standings
	Conf.					Overall
Team	W		L		T	W		L		T
Central Michigan +	5	–	1	–	0	8	–	1	–	0
Michigan State Normal +	5	–	1	–	0	7	–	2	–	0
Southern Illinois	4	–	1	–	1	4	–	4	–	2
Western Illinois	2	–	3	–	1	5	–	4	–	1
Illinois State Normal	2	–	3	–	1	3	–	4	–	2
Eastern Illinois	1	–	5	–	0	3	–	6	–	0
Northern Illinois State	0	–	5	–	1	0	–	8	–	1
+ – Conference co-champions

The 1955 Southern Illinois Salukis football team was an American football team that represented Southern Illinois University (now known as Southern Illinois University Carbondale) in the Interstate Intercollegiate Athletic Conference (IIAC) during the 1955 college football season. Under first-year head coach Albert Kawal, the team compiled a 4–4–2 record. The team played its home games at McAndrew Stadium in Carbondale, Illinois.

== Schedule ==
Date	Opponent	Site	Result	Attendance	Source
September 17	at Southeast Missouri State*	Houck Stadium; Cape Girardeau, MO	L 0–7	4,200	
September 24	at Illinois Wesleyan*	Bloomington, IL	L 13–14		
October 1	Central Michigan	McAndrew Stadium; Carbondale, IL	W 14–13		
October 15	Eastern Illinois	McAndrew Stadium; Carbondale, IL	W 26–13		
October 22	at Michigan State Normal	Briggs Field; Ypsilanti, MI	L 2–7		
October 29	at Western Illinois	Hanson Field; Macomb, IL	T 13–13	8,000	
November 5	Washington University*^{†}	McAndrew Stadium; Carbondale, IL	L 13–32	9,400	
November 12	at Illinois State Normal	McCormick Field; Normal, IL	W 28–14		
November 19	Northern Illinois State	McAndrew Stadium; Carbondale, IL	W 20–0		
November 24	Bradley*	McAndrew Stadium; Carbondale, IL	T 7–7		
*Non-conference game; ^{†}Homecoming

== NFL draft ==
The following Saluki was selected in the 1956 NFL draft following the season.

Round	Pick	Player	Position	NFL team
30	356	Wayne Williams	End	New York Giants
