= 1955 Butler Bulldogs football team =

American college football season

1955 Butler Bulldogs football
- Conference: Indiana Collegiate Conference
- Record: 3–5 (3–3 ICC)
- Head coach: Tony Hinkle (18th season)
- Home stadium: Butler Bowl

1955 Indiana Collegiate Conference football standings
| | Conf. | | | | | Overall |
| Team | W | | L | | T | W | | L | | T |
|---|---|---|---|---|---|---|---|---|---|---|
| Evansville + | 5 | – | 1 | – | 0 | 6 | – | 3 | – | 0 |
| Saint Joseph's (IN) + | 5 | – | 1 | – | 0 | 6 | – | 3 | – | 0 |
| Valparaiso | 4 | – | 2 | – | 0 | 5 | – | 4 | – | 0 |
| Butler | 3 | – | 3 | – | 0 | 3 | – | 5 | – | 0 |
| DePauw | 2 | – | 4 | – | 0 | 5 | – | 4 | – | 0 |
| Ball State | 1 | – | 5 | – | 0 | 3 | – | 5 | – | 0 |
| Indiana State | 1 | – | 5 | – | 0 | 2 | – | 6 | – | 0 |
+ – Conference co-champions

The 1955 Butler Bulldogs football team was an American football team that represented Butler University as a member of the Indiana Collegiate Conference (ICC) during the 1955 college football season. In their 18th year under head coach Tony Hinkle, the Bulldogs compiled a 3–5 record (3–3 in conference games), finished fourth in the ICC, and were outscored by a total of 191 to 137.

The team tallied 1,561 rushing yards (195.1 per game) and 707 passing yards (88.4 per game). On defense, the team gave up 1,712 rushing yards and 532 passing yards. The individual statistical leaders included fullback Leroy Thompson (539 rushing yards, 30 points scored), quarterback Dick Ahrendts (661 passing yards), and end Scott Chandler (15 receptions, 219 yards).

The team played home games at the Butler Bowl in Indianapolis.

== Schedule ==
| Date | Time | Opponent | Site | TV | Result | Attendance | Source |
|---|---|---|---|---|---|---|---|
| September 24 | 3:00 p.m. | Evansville | Butler Bowl; Indianapolis, IN | | L 14–45 | | |
| October 1 | 2:00 p.m. | at Indiana State | Memorial Stadium; Terre Haute, IN | | W 26–19 | 3,000 | |
| October 8 | 2:00 p.m. | Ball State | Butler Bowl; Indianapolis, IN | | W 20–13 | 3,714 | |
| October 15 | | at Saint Joseph's (IN) | Rensselaer, IN | | L 13–28 | | |
| October 22 | 2:00 p.m. | DePauw | Butler Bowl; Indianapolis, IN | | W 18–7 | 5,269 | |
| October 29 | 2:00 p.m. | Valparaiso | Butler Bowl; Indianapolis, IN (rivalry) | | L 14–24 | 6,217 | |
| November 5 | 2:30 p.m. | at Wabash* | Ingalls Field; Crawfordsville, IN | | L 12–14 | | |
| November 12 | 3:00 p.m. | at Washington University* | Francis Field; St. Louis, MO | KSD-TV | L 20–41 | | |
*Non-conference game; All times are in Eastern time
