= 1955 Saint Joseph's Pumas football team =

American college football season

1955 Saint Joseph's Pumas football

ICC co-champion
- Conference: Indiana Collegiate Conference
- Record: 6–3 (5–1 ICC)
- Head coach: Bob Jauron (2nd season)

1955 Indiana Collegiate Conference football standings
| | Conf. | | | | | Overall |
| Team | W | | L | | T | W | | L | | T |
|---|---|---|---|---|---|---|---|---|---|---|
| Evansville + | 5 | – | 1 | – | 0 | 6 | – | 3 | – | 0 |
| Saint Joseph's (IN) + | 5 | – | 1 | – | 0 | 6 | – | 3 | – | 0 |
| Valparaiso | 4 | – | 2 | – | 0 | 5 | – | 4 | – | 0 |
| Butler | 3 | – | 3 | – | 0 | 3 | – | 5 | – | 0 |
| DePauw | 2 | – | 4 | – | 0 | 5 | – | 4 | – | 0 |
| Ball State | 1 | – | 5 | – | 0 | 3 | – | 5 | – | 0 |
| Indiana State | 1 | – | 5 | – | 0 | 2 | – | 6 | – | 0 |
+ – Conference co-champions

The 1955 Saint Joseph's Pumas football team represented Saint Joseph's College as a member of the Indiana Collegiate Conference (ICC) during the 1955 college football season. Led by second-year head coach Bob Jauron, the Pumas compiled an overall record of 6–3 with a mark of 5–1 in conference play, sharing the ICC title with Evansville.

== Schedule ==
| Date | Time | Opponent | Site | Result | Source |
|---|---|---|---|---|---|
| September 17 | 8:00 p.m. | vs. Central State (OH)* | Shewbridge Field; Chicago, IL | L 14–26 | |
| September 24 | | at DePauw | Greencastle, IN | W 27–13 | |
| October 1 | | Valparaiso | Rensselaer, IN | W 26–0 | |
| October 8 | 12:30 p.m. | at Indiana State | Memorial Stadium; Terre Haute, IN | W 27–0 | |
| October 15 | | Butler | Rensselaer, IN | W 28–13 | |
| October 22 | 8:00 p.m. | at Evansville | Reitz Bowl; Evansville, IN | L 13–26 | |
| October 29 | | Ball State | Rensselaer, IN | W 28–0 | |
| November 5 | | Heidelberg* | Rensselaer, IN | L 13–14 | |
| November 12 | | Chicago Navy Pier* | Rensselaer, IN | W 39–12 | |
*Non-conference game; All times are in Central time
