= 1955 Xavier Musketeers football team =

American college football season

1955 Xavier Musketeers football
- Conference: Independent
- Record: 7–2
- Head coach: Harry Connolly (1st season)
- Home stadium: Xavier Stadium

1955 Midwestern college football independents records
	Conf.			Overall
Team	W	L	T	W		L		T
Ferris Institute		–		6	–	1	–	0
No. 9 Notre Dame		–		8	–	2	–	0
Xavier		–		7	–	2	–	0
Carthage		–		6	–	2	–	0
Wabash		–		5	–	3	–	1
Michigan Tech		–		4	–	3	–	0
Washington University		–		5	–	4	–	0
Drake		–		4	–	4	–	0
Youngstown		–		4	–	5	–	0
Dayton		–		3	–	6	–	0
Marquette		–		2	–	6	–	1
Baldwin–Wallace		–		2	–	6	–	0
Cincinnati		–		1	–	6	–	2
Rose Poly		–		1	–	6	–	1
Northern Michigan		–		0	–	7	–	0
Rankings from AP Poll

The 1955 Xavier Musketeers football team was an American football team that represented Xavier University as an independent during the 1955 college football season. In its first season under head coach Harry Connolly, the team compiled a 7–2 record and outscored opponents by a total of 196 to 72. The team played its home games at Xavier Stadium in Cincinnati.

== Schedule ==
Date	Opponent	Site	Result	Attendance	Source
September 18	Quantico Marines	Xavier Stadium; Cincinnati, OH	L 7–21	13,000	
September 24	Louisville	Xavier Stadium; Cincinnati, OH	W 49–20	4,500	
October 1	at Miami (OH)	Miami Field; Oxford, OH	L 12–13	9,465	
October 8	at Cincinnati	Nippert Stadium; Cincinnati, OH	W 37–0	28,000–29,000	
October 15	at Dayton	U.D. Stadium; Dayton, OH	W 12–6	11,000	
October 22	Youngstown State	Xavier Stadium; Cincinnati, OH	W 26–0		
October 29	Boston College^{†}	Xavier Stadium; Cincinnati, OH	W 19–12	11,500	
November 5	at Great Lakes Navy	Constitutional Field; North Chicago, IL	W 13–0	2,500	
November 19	at Marshall	Fairfield Stadium; Huntington, WV	W 21–0		
^{†}Homecoming
