= 1955 Marquette Warriors football team =

American college football season

1955 Marquette Warriors football
- Conference: Independent
- Record: 2–6–1
- Head coach: Frosty Ferzacca (2nd season)
- Home stadium: Marquette Stadium

1955 Midwestern college football independents records
	Conf.			Overall
Team	W	L	T	W		L		T
Ferris Institute		–		6	–	1	–	0
No. 9 Notre Dame		–		8	–	2	–	0
Xavier		–		7	–	2	–	0
Carthage		–		6	–	2	–	0
Wabash		–		5	–	3	–	1
Michigan Tech		–		4	–	3	–	0
Washington University		–		5	–	4	–	0
Drake		–		4	–	4	–	0
Youngstown		–		4	–	5	–	0
Dayton		–		3	–	6	–	0
Marquette		–		2	–	6	–	1
Baldwin–Wallace		–		2	–	6	–	0
Cincinnati		–		1	–	6	–	2
Rose Poly		–		1	–	6	–	1
Northern Michigan		–		0	–	7	–	0
Rankings from AP Poll

The 1955 Marquette Warriors football team was an American football team that represented Marquette University as an independent during the 1955 college football season. In its second and final season under head coach Frosty Ferzacca, the team compiled a 2–6–1 record and was outscored by a total of 194 to 77. The team played its home games at Marquette Stadium in Milwaukee.

== Schedule ==
Date	Opponent	Site	Result	Attendance	Source
September 24	at Wisconsin	Camp Randall Stadium; Madison, WI	L 14–28	53,359	
October 1	Tulsa	Marquette Stadium; Milwaukee, WI	W 13–0	14,000	
October 8	Kansas State	Marquette Stadium; Milwaukee, WI	L 0–42	13,500	
October 15	at Cincinnati	Nippert Stadium; Cincinnati, OH	L 12–13	16,000	
October 21	at No. 17 Boston College	Fenway Park; Boston, MA	T 13–13	18,224–18,324	
October 29	No. 7 West Virginia	Marquette Stadium; Milwaukee, WI	L 0–39	16,000	
November 5	Detroit	Marquette Stadium; Milwaukee, WI	L 7–20	10,000	
November 12	Holy Cross	Marquette Stadium; Milwaukee, WI	W 18–6	8,500	
November 19	at No. 3 Michigan State	Macklin Stadium; East Lansing, MI	L 0–33	41,814	
Rankings from AP Poll released prior to the game
