= 1955 Valparaiso Crusaders football team =

American college football season

1955 Valparaiso Crusaders football
- Conference: Indiana Collegiate Conference
- Record: 5–4 (4–2 ICC)
- Head coach: Emory Bauer (10th season)
- Home stadium: Bouchers Field, Ames Field, Brown Field

1955 Indiana Collegiate Conference football standings
	Conf.					Overall
Team	W		L		T	W		L		T
Evansville +	5	–	1	–	0	6	–	3	–	0
Saint Joseph's (IN) +	5	–	1	–	0	6	–	3	–	0
Valparaiso	4	–	2	–	0	5	–	4	–	0
Butler	3	–	3	–	0	3	–	5	–	0
DePauw	2	–	4	–	0	5	–	4	–	0
Ball State	1	–	5	–	0	3	–	5	–	0
Indiana State	1	–	5	–	0	2	–	6	–	0
+ – Conference co-champions

The 1955 Valparaiso Crusaders football team represented Valparaiso University as a member of the Indiana Collegiate Conference (ICC) during the 1955 college football season. Led by tenth-year head coach Emory Bauer, the Crusaders compiled an overall record of 5–4 with a mark of 4–2 in conference play, placing third in the ICC.

== Schedule ==
Date	Time	Opponent	Site	Result	Attendance	Source
September 17	1:30 p.m.	at Wabash*	Ingalls Field; Crawfordsville, IN	L 14–26		
September 24	8:00 p.m.	Indiana State	Bouchers Field; Valparaiso, IN	W 27–9	4,000	
October 1		at Saint Joseph's (IN)	Rensselaer, IN	L 0–26		
October 8	8:00 p.m.	Evansville	Ames Field; Valparaiso, IN	W 29–18	3,000	
October 15	1:30 p.m.	DePauw^{†}	Brown Field; Valparaiso, IN	L 20–40	6,000	
October 22	1:00 p.m.	at Ball State	Ball State Field; Muncie, IN	W 26–7		
October 29	1:00 p.m.	at Butler	Butler Bowl; Indianapolis, IN (rivalry)	W 24–14	6,217	
November 5	1:30 p.m.	Wheaton (IL)*	Brown Field; Valparaiso, IN	W 27–13		
November 12		at Bradley*	Peoria, IL	L 12–32		
*Non-conference game; ^{†}Homecoming; All times are in Central time
