= 1954 Ball State Cardinals football team =

American college football season

1954 Ball State Cardinals football
- Conference: Indiana Collegiate Conference
- Record: 6–2 (4–2 ICC)
- Head coach: George Serdula (2nd season)

1954 Indiana Collegiate Conference football standings
	Conf.					Overall
Team	W		L		T	W		L		T
Valparaiso $	5	–	1	–	0	6	–	2	–	1
Ball State	4	–	2	–	0	6	–	2	–	0
Evansville	4	–	2	–	0	5	–	4	–	0
Butler	3	–	2	–	0	4	–	4	–	0
Saint Joseph's (IN)	2	–	4	–	0	5	–	4	–	0
Indiana State	2	–	4	–	0	4	–	4	–	0
DePauw	0	–	5	–	0	0	–	7	–	1
$ – Conference champion

The 1954 Ball State Cardinals football team was an American football team that represented Ball State Teachers College (later renamed Ball State University) in the Indiana Collegiate Conference (ICC) during the 1954 college football season. In their second season under head coach George Serdula, the Cardinals compiled a 6–2 record (4–2 against ICC opponents), tied for second place out of seven teams in the ICC, and outscored all opponents by a total of 218 to 113.

== Schedule ==
Date	Opponent	Site	Result	Attendance	Source
September 18	at Hanover*	Hanover, IN	W 40–6		
September 25	at James Millikin	Decatur High School Athletic Field; Decatur, IL	W 27–7		
October 2	DePauw	Ball State Field; Muncie, IN	W 40–14		
October 9	Butler^{†}	Ball State Field; Muncie, IN	W 26–13	9,000	
October 16	at Indiana State	Memorial Stadium; Terre Haute, IN (Blue Key Victory Bell)	L 13–14		
October 23	at Valparaiso	Valparaiso, IN	L 21–46	5,800	
October 30	Saint Joseph's (IN)	Ball State Field; Muncie, IN	W 26–6		
November 6	at Evansville	Reitz Bowl; Evansville, IN	W 25–7	4,000	
*Non-conference game; ^{†}Homecoming
