= 1955 Cincinnati Bearcats football team =

American college football season

1955 Cincinnati Bearcats football
- Conference: Independent
- Record: 1–6–2
- Head coach: George Blackburn (1st season)
- Captain: Joe Miller
- Home stadium: Nippert Stadium

1955 Midwestern college football independents records
	Conf.			Overall
Team	W	L	T	W		L		T
Ferris Institute		–		6	–	1	–	0
No. 9 Notre Dame		–		8	–	2	–	0
Xavier		–		7	–	2	–	0
Carthage		–		6	–	2	–	0
Wabash		–		5	–	3	–	1
Michigan Tech		–		4	–	3	–	0
Washington University		–		5	–	4	–	0
Drake		–		4	–	4	–	0
Youngstown		–		4	–	5	–	0
Dayton		–		3	–	6	–	0
Marquette		–		2	–	6	–	1
Baldwin–Wallace		–		2	–	6	–	0
Cincinnati		–		1	–	6	–	2
Rose Poly		–		1	–	6	–	1
Northern Michigan		–		0	–	7	–	0
Rankings from AP Poll

The 1955 Cincinnati Bearcats football team was an American football team that represented the University of Cincinnati as an independent during the 1955 college football season. In their first year under head coach George Blackburn, the Bearcats compiled a 1–6–2 and were outscored by a total of 199 to 97.

== Schedule ==
Date	Opponent	Site	Result	Attendance	Source
September 24	Dayton	Nippert Stadium; Cincinnati, OH	L 14–15	25,000	
October 1	at Pacific (CA)	Pacific Memorial Stadium; Stockton, CA	L 13–27	14,500	
October 8	Xavier	Nippert Stadium; Cincinnati, OH (rivalry)	L 0–37	28,000–29,000	
October 15	Marquette	Nippert Stadium; Cincinnati, OH	W 13–12	16,000	
October 22	at Tulsa	Skelly Stadium; Tulsa, OK	T 21–21	14,079	
October 29	Detroit	Nippert Stadium; Cincinnati, OH	T 0–0	17,000	
November 5	at Wichita	Veterans Field; Wichita, KS	L 16–20	12,805	
November 12	Hardin–Simmons	Nippert Stadium; Cincinnati, OH	L 20–53	16,000	
November 24	Miami (OH)	Nippert Stadium; Cincinnati, OH (Victory Bell)	L 0–14	25,000	
