= George Serdula =

American football player and coach (1920–2002)

- Serdula pictured in Orient 1954, Ball State yearbook

Biographical details
- Born: January 17, 1920; Midway, Wheeling Township, Belmont County, Ohio
- Died: October 26, 2002 (aged 82); St. Cloud, Minnesota, U.S.

Playing career
- c. 1940: Muskingum

Coaching career (HC unless noted)
- 1946–1947: Barnesville HS (OH)
- 1948–1952: Ball State (assistant)
- 1953–1955: Ball State

Head coaching record
- Overall: 14–9–1 (college)

George Serdula (January 17, 1920 – October 26, 2002) was an American college football player and coach and university professor. He served as the head football coach at Ball State Teachers College—now Ball State University—from 1953 to 1955, compiling a record of 14–9–1.

Serdula was born in Midway, Wheeling Township, Belmont County, Ohio and played football at Muskingum College, from which he graduated in 1942. He served in the United States Army Air Forces during World War II as a flight engineer, and held the rank of first lieutenant while serving with the Twentieth Air Force. Serdula resigned at football coach at Ball State in March 1956 to complete a doctoral degree at Indiana University Bloomington. He was later a professor of health sciences at St. Cloud State University. He retired in 1984 and was inducted into the Muskingum Hall of Fame in 1993. He died on October 26, 2002, in St. Cloud, Minnesota.

== Head coaching record ==
=== College ===
Year	Team	Overall	Conference	Standing	Bowl/playoffs
Ball State Cardinals (Indiana Collegiate Conference) (1953–1955)
1953	Ball State	5–2–1	3–2	T–2nd	
1954	Ball State	6–2	4–2	T–2nd	
1955	Ball State	3–5	1–5	T–6th	
Ball State Teachers:		14–9–1	8–9		
Total:		14–9–1			
