= Bob Kahler =

American football player and coach (1917–2013)

No. 8
- Positions: Defensive back, halfback

Personal information
- Born: February 13, 1917; Grand Island, Nebraska, U.S.
- Died: April 16, 2013 (aged 96); Palm Harbor, Florida, U.S.
- Listed height: 6 ft 3 in (1.91 m)
- Listed weight: 201 lb (91 kg)

Career information
- High school: Grand Island
- College: Nebraska

Career history
- Green Bay Packers (1942–1944)

Awards and highlights
- NFL champion (1944)

Career statistics
- Rushing att–yards: 9–9
- Receptions-yards: 2–21
- Touchdowns: 0
- Stats at Pro Football Reference

Robert William Kahler (February 13, 1917 – April 16, 2013) was an American football player and coach. He played professionally as a defensive back and halfback in the National Football League (NFL) for the Green Bay Packers from 1942 to 1944. Kahler played college football for the Nebraska Cornhuskers. He retired from playing in 1944.

After military service in World War II, Kahler returned to Nebraska as an assistant football and track coach. In 1947–48, he was the head football and track coach at Nebraska City High School. In 1948, he moved to State Normal School and Teacher's College in Wayne, Nebraska—now Wayne State College—as head football coach and led his team to a share of the Nebraska College Conference championship. The following year, he moved to Northern Illinois University, where he served as head coach for one season in 1955.

While at the University of Nebraska–Lincoln, Kahler was also an accomplished track and field athlete, setting an American indoor record of 7.8 seconds in the 70 yards hurdles.

== Head coaching record ==
=== College football ===
Year	Team	Overall	Conference	Standing	Bowl/playoffs
Wayne State Wildcats (Nebraska College Conference) (1948)
1948	Wayne State	8–1	6–1	T–1st	
Wayne State:		8–1	6–1		
Northern Illinois State / Northern Illinois Huskies (Interstate Intercollegiate Athletic Conference) (1955)
1955	Northern Illinois State	0–8–1	0–5–1	7th	
Northern Illinois State:		0–8–1	0–5–1		
Total:		8–9–1			
National championship Conference title Conference division title or championship game berth
