= 1955 Western Illinois Leathernecks football team =

American college football season

1955 Western Illinois Leathernecks football

Corn Bowl, L 20–24 vs. Luther
- Conference: Interstate Intercollegiate Athletic Conference
- Record: 5–4–1, 1 win forfeited (2–3–1 IIAC, 1 win forfeited)
- Head coach: Wes Stevens (2nd season)
- Home stadium: Hanson Field

1955 Interstate Intercollegiate Athletic Conference football standings
	Conf.					Overall
Team	W		L		T	W		L		T
Central Michigan +	5	–	1	–	0	8	–	1	–	0
Michigan State Normal +	5	–	1	–	0	7	–	2	–	0
Southern Illinois	4	–	1	–	1	4	–	4	–	2
Western Illinois	2	–	3	–	1	5	–	4	–	1
Illinois State Normal	2	–	3	–	1	3	–	4	–	2
Eastern Illinois	1	–	5	–	0	3	–	6	–	0
Northern Illinois State	0	–	5	–	1	0	–	8	–	1
+ – Conference co-champions

The 1955 Western Illinois Leathernecks football team represented Western Illinois University as a member of the Interstate Intercollegiate Athletic Conference (IIAC) during the 1955 college football season. Led by second-year head coach Wes Stevens, the Leathernecks finished the season with an overall record of 6–3–1 and a mark of 3–2–1 in conference play, placing fourth in the IIAC. Western Illinois later forfeited its win over Illinois State Normal, dropping its season record to 5–4–1 overall and 2–3–1 in the IIAC, putting the team into a fourth-place tie with Illinois State. The forfeit came as a result of Western Illinois using an ineligible player, quarterback Sam Esposito; while Esposito also played in other games for the team, Illinois State Normal was the only school to protest their result.

Western Illinois back Don Lashmet was selected by the Associated Press as a first-team player on the 1955 All-Interstate Conference football team. Lashmet led the conference in pass receiving with 16 catches for 299 yards and two touchdowns. As a team, Western Illinois led the conference with 40 pass completions for 611 yards. Bill Vandermerkt was credited with 30 of the team's completed passes.

== Schedule ==
Date	Time	Opponent	Site	Result	Attendance	Source
September 17		at Loras*	Dubuque, IA	W 15–0		
September 29		Bradley*	Hanson Field; Macomb, IL	W 25–6		
October 7		Michigan State Normal	Hanson Field; Macomb, IL	L 2–6		
October 15		at Central Michigan	Alumni Field; Mount Pleasant, MI	L 0–20	6,400	
October 22		at Northern Illinois State	Glidden Field; Dekalb, IL	W 39–6		
October 29		Southern Illinois^{†}	Hanson Field; Macomb, IL	T 13–13	8,000	
November 4		at Illinois State Normal	Normal, IL	L 32–13 (forfeit)		
November 11		St. Ambrose*	Hanson Field; Macomb, IL	W 19–13		
November 19	1:30 p.m.	at Eastern Illinois	Charleston, IL	W 13–7		
November 24		Luther*	Hanson Field; Macomb, IL (Corn Bowl)	L 20–24	5,000	
*Non-conference game; ^{†}Homecoming; All times are in Central time
