= Bob Jauron =

American football player and coach (1919–2010)

Biographical details
- Born: May 8, 1919; Nashua, New Hampshire, U.S.
- Died: July 20, 2010 (aged 91); Salem, Massachusetts, U.S.
- Education: Boston College (1942)

Playing career
- 1939–1941: Boston College
- 1944: Amarillo AAF
- Position: Halfback

Coaching career (HC unless noted)
- 1946–1948: Miles City HS (MT)
- 1949–1951: Peoria Manual HS (IL)
- 1952: Western Military Academy (IL)
- 1953: Chaminade HS (OH)
- 1954–1958: Saint Joseph's (IN)
- 1959: Kitchener-Waterloo Dutchmen
- 1960: Manchester Memorial HS (NH)
- 1961: Lynn HS (MA)
- 1962–1963: Lynn Classical HS (MA)
- 1967: Xavier (OL)
- 1968: Holy Cross (OB)
- 1971–1972: Brandeis

Head coaching record
- Overall: 32–13–1 (varsity college)
- Tournaments: 0–0–1 (NAIA playoffs)

Accomplishments and honors

Championships
- 1 NAIA (1956); 3 ICC (1955–1957)

Robert Thomas Jauron (May 8, 1919 – July 20, 2010) was an American football player and coach.

A native of Nashua, New Hampshire, Jauron attended Nashua High School where he was a three-sport star in football, baseball, and track. After graduating from high school in 1938, he played college football (as a halfback) and baseball at Boston College.

Jauron began his coaching career as a high school coach, compiling a 73–14–1 record. He next served as the head football coach at St. Joseph's College in Rensselaer, Indiana, from 1954 to 1958. He compiled a 32–13–1 record in five years at Saint Joseph's and left the position in the spring of 1959.

After leaving Saint Joseph's, Jauron coached for a year for the Kitchener-Waterloo Dutchmen of the Ontario Rugby Football Union. In 1960, he returned to high school as the head coach at Memorial High School in Manchester, New Hampshire. After one year in Manchester, he accepted a high school coaching position in Lynn, Massachusetts. In March 1967, he was hired as an offensive coach at Xavier University in Cincinnati. He also served as the head football coach for Brandeis University's club team from 1971 to 1972.

Jauron was the father of National Football League coach Dick Jauron.

== Head coaching record ==
=== Varsity college ===
Year	Team	Overall	Conference	Standing	Bowl/playoffs
Saint Joseph's Pumas (Indiana Collegiate Conference) (1954–1958)
1954	Saint Joseph's	5–4	2–4	T–5th	
1955	Saint Joseph's	6–3	5–1	1st	
1956	Saint Joseph's	8–1–1	6–0	1st	T Aluminum
1957	Saint Joseph's	8–1	5–0	1st	
1958	Saint Joseph's	5–4	4–2	T–2nd	
Saint Joseph's:		32–13–1	22–7		
Total:		32–13–1			
National championship Conference title Conference division title or championship game berth
