= 1955 Notre Dame Fighting Irish football team =

American college football season

1955 Notre Dame Fighting Irish football
- Conference: Independent

Ranking
- Coaches: No. 10
- AP: No. 9
- Record: 8–2
- Head coach: Terry Brennan (2nd season)
- Captain: Ray Lemek
- Home stadium: Notre Dame Stadium

1955 Midwestern college football independents records
	Conf.			Overall
Team	W	L	T	W		L		T
Ferris Institute		–		6	–	1	–	0
No. 9 Notre Dame		–		8	–	2	–	0
Xavier		–		7	–	2	–	0
Carthage		–		6	–	2	–	0
Wabash		–		5	–	3	–	1
Michigan Tech		–		4	–	3	–	0
Washington University		–		5	–	4	–	0
Drake		–		4	–	4	–	0
Youngstown		–		4	–	5	–	0
Dayton		–		3	–	6	–	0
Marquette		–		2	–	6	–	1
Baldwin–Wallace		–		2	–	6	–	0
Cincinnati		–		1	–	6	–	2
Rose Poly		–		1	–	6	–	1
Northern Michigan		–		0	–	7	–	0
Rankings from AP Poll

The 1955 Notre Dame Fighting Irish football team was an American football team that represented the University of Notre Dame as an independent during the 1955 college football season. In their second year under head coach Terry Brennan, the Fighting Irish compiled an 8–2, outscored opponents by a total of 210 to 112, and were ranked No 9 in the final AP poll.

Paul Hornung was a consensus first-team pick on the 1955 All-America college football team. Guard Pat Bisceglia also received first-team honors from the Associated Press and NBC, and fullback Don Schaefer received first-team honors from the American Football Coaches Association, the Football Writers Association of America, the International News Service, and NBC. Ray Lemek was the team captain.

The team played its home games at Notre Dame Stadium in Notre Dame, Indiana.

== Schedule ==
Date	Opponent	Rank	Site	Result	Attendance	Source
September 24	SMU	No. 11	Notre Dame Stadium; Notre Dame, IN	W 17–0	56,454	
October 1	Indiana	No. 4	Notre Dame Stadium; Notre Dame, IN	W 19–0	56,494	
October 7	at No. 15 Miami (FL)	No. 5	Burdine Stadium; Miami, FL (rivalry)	W 14–0	75,685	
October 15	at No. 13 Michigan State	No. 4	Macklin Stadium; East Lansing, MI (rivalry)	L 7–21	52,007	
October 22	at Purdue	No. 11	Ross–Ade Stadium; West Lafayette, IN (rivalry)	W 22–7	55,000	
October 29	No. 4 Navy	No. 9	Notre Dame Stadium; Notre Dame, IN (rivalry)	W 21–7	59,475	
November 5	at Penn	No. 6	Franklin Field; Philadelphia, PA	W 46–14	45,226	
November 12	at North Carolina	No. 5	Kenan Memorial Stadium; Chapel Hill, NC (rivalry)	W 27–7	38,000	
November 19	Iowa	No. 4	Notre Dame Stadium; Notre Dame, IN	W 17–14	59,955	
November 26	at USC	No. 5	Los Angeles Memorial Coliseum; Los Angeles, CA (rivalry)	L 20–42	94,892	
Rankings from AP Poll released prior to the game
