= 1955 Michigan State Normal Hurons football team =

American college football season

1955 Michigan State Normal Hurons football

IIAC co-champion
- Conference: Interstate Intercollegiate Athletic Conference
- Record: 7–2 (5–1 IIAC)
- Head coach: Fred Trosko (4th season)
- MVP: Virgil Windom
- Captain: Barry C. Basel
- Home stadium: Briggs Field

1955 Interstate Intercollegiate Athletic Conference football standings
	Conf.					Overall
Team	W		L		T	W		L		T
Central Michigan +	5	–	1	–	0	8	–	1	–	0
Michigan State Normal +	5	–	1	–	0	7	–	2	–	0
Southern Illinois	4	–	1	–	1	4	–	4	–	2
Western Illinois	2	–	3	–	1	5	–	4	–	1
Illinois State Normal	2	–	3	–	1	3	–	4	–	2
Eastern Illinois	1	–	5	–	0	3	–	6	–	0
Northern Illinois State	0	–	5	–	1	0	–	8	–	1
+ – Conference co-champions

The 1955 Michigan State Normal Hurons football team represented Michigan State Normal College (renamed Eastern Michigan College in 1956) in the Interstate Intercollegiate Athletic Conference (IIAC) during the 1955 college football season. In their fourth season under head coach Fred Trosko, the Hurons compiled a 7–2 record (3–3 against IIAC opponents), tied with Central Michigan for the IIAC championship, and outscored their opponents, 138 to 70. Barry C. Basel was the team captain. The team's statistical leaders included Tom McCormick with 461 rushing yards and the same number of yards of total offense and Virgil Windom with seven touchdowns for 42 points. Virgil Windom received the team's most valuable player award.

== Schedule ==
Date	Opponent	Site	Result	Attendance	Source
September 17	Hope*	Briggs Field; Ypsilanti, MI	W 27–0		
September 24	Hillsdale*	Briggs Field; Ypsilanti, MI	L 6–20		
October 1	at Baldwin-Wallace*	Cleveland, OH	W 20–0		
October 7	at Western Illinois	Hanson Field; Macomb, IL	W 6–2		
October 15	Illinois State Normal	Briggs Field; Ypsilanti, MI	W 25–6		
October 22	Southern Illinois ^{†}	Briggs Field; Ypsilanti, MI	W 7–2		
October 29	at Eastern Illinois	Lincoln Field; Charleston, IL	W 14–7		
November 5	Central Michigan	Briggs Field; Ypsilanti, MI (rivalry)	L 20–27	5,000	
November 12	at Northern Illinois State	Glidden Field; DeKalb, IL	W 13–6		
*Non-conference game; ^{†}Homecoming
