= 1955 Northern Illinois State Huskies football team =

American college football season

1955 Northern Illinois State Huskies football
- Conference: Interstate Intercollegiate Athletic Conference
- Record: 0–8–1 (0–5–1 IIAC)
- Head coach: Bob Kahler (1st season)
- MVP: Donald Davis
- Captain: Ed Bauer
- Home stadium: Glidden Field

1955 Interstate Intercollegiate Athletic Conference football standings
	Conf.					Overall
Team	W		L		T	W		L		T
Central Michigan +	5	–	1	–	0	8	–	1	–	0
Michigan State Normal +	5	–	1	–	0	7	–	2	–	0
Southern Illinois	4	–	1	–	1	4	–	4	–	2
Western Illinois	2	–	3	–	1	5	–	4	–	1
Illinois State Normal	2	–	3	–	1	3	–	4	–	2
Eastern Illinois	1	–	5	–	0	3	–	6	–	0
Northern Illinois State	0	–	5	–	1	0	–	8	–	1
+ – Conference co-champions

The 1955 Northern Illinois State Huskies football team represented Northern Illinois State College—now known as Northern Illinois University—as a member of the Interstate Intercollegiate Athletic Conference (IIAC) during the 1955 college football season. Led by Bob Kahler in his first and only season as head coach, the Huskies compiled an overall record of 0–8–1 with a mark of 0–5–1 in conference play, placing last out of seven teams in the IIAC. The team played home games at the 5,500-seat Glidden Field, located on the east end of campus, in DeKalb, Illinois.

== Schedule ==
Date	Opponent	Site	Result	Source
September 24	at Wheaton (IL)*	Grange Field; Wheaton, IL	L 0–12	
October 1	Illinois State Normal	Glidden Field; DeKalb, IL	T 7–7	
October 8	at Central Michigan	Alumni Field; Mount Pleasant, MI	L 0–61	
October 15	Bradley*^{†}	Glidden Field; DeKalb, IL	L 0–40	
October 22	Western Illinois	Glidden Field; DeKalb, IL	L 6–39	
October 29	at Omaha*	Al F. Caniglia Field; Omaha, NE	L 12–27	
November 5	at Eastern Illinois	Lincoln Field; Charleston, IL	L 0–14	
November 12	Michigan State Normal	Glidden Field; DeKalb, IL	L 6–13	
November 19	at Southern Illinois	McAndrew Stadium; Carbondale, IL	L 0–20	
*Non-conference game; ^{†}Homecoming
