= 1955 Illinois State Normal Redbirds football team =

American college football season

1955 Illinois State Normal Redbirds football
- Conference: Interstate Intercollegiate Athletic Conference
- Record: 3–4–2 (2–3–1 IIAC)
- Head coach: Edwin Struck (11th season)
- MVP: Bill Booker
- Captains: Bob Riggenbach; Bill Booker
- Home stadium: McCormick Field

1955 Interstate Intercollegiate Athletic Conference football standings
	Conf.					Overall
Team	W		L		T	W		L		T
Central Michigan +	5	–	1	–	0	8	–	1	–	0
Michigan State Normal +	5	–	1	–	0	7	–	2	–	0
Southern Illinois	4	–	1	–	1	4	–	4	–	2
Western Illinois	2	–	3	–	1	5	–	4	–	1
Illinois State Normal	2	–	3	–	1	3	–	4	–	2
Eastern Illinois	1	–	5	–	0	3	–	6	–	0
Northern Illinois State	0	–	5	–	1	0	–	8	–	1
+ – Conference co-champions

The 1955 Illinois State Normal Redbirds football team represented Illinois State Normal University—now known as Illinois State University—as a member of the Interstate Intercollegiate Athletic Conference (IIAC) during the 1955 college football season. Led by 11th-year head coach Edwin Struck, the Redbirds compiled an overall record of 3–4–2 with a mark of 2–3–1 in conference play, tying for fourth place in the IIAC. Illinois State Normal played home games at McCormick Field in Normal, Illinois.

While the team lost its game against Western Illinois, it was later awarded a win by forfeit due to Western Illinois' use of an ineligible player.

== Schedule ==
Date	Opponent	Site	Result	Source
September 23	at Bradley*	Peoria, IL	L 7–18	
October 1	at Northern Illinois State	Glidden Field; DeKalb, IL	T 7–7	
October 8	Eastern Illinois	McCormick Field; Normal, IL (rivalry)	W 16–13	
October 15	at Michigan State Normal	Briggs Field; Ypsilanti, MI	L 6–25	
October 22	Central Michigan^{†}	McCormick Field; Normal, IL	L 7–35	
October 29	Lewis*	McCormick Field; Normal, IL	T 20–20	
November 4	at Western Illinois	Hanson Field; Macomb, IL	W 13–32 (forfeit)	
November 12	Southern Illinois	McCormick Field; Normal, IL	L 14–28	
November 19	Illinois Wesleyan*	McCormick Field; Normal, IL	W 20–13	
*Non-conference game; ^{†}Homecoming
