= 1955 Central Michigan Chippewas football team =

American college football season

1955 Central Michigan Chippewas football

IIAC co-champion
- Conference: Interstate Intercollegiate Athletic Conference
- Record: 8–1 (5–1 IIAC)
- Head coach: Kenneth Kelly (5th season)
- MVP: Bernie Raterink
- Home stadium: Alumni Field

1955 Interstate Intercollegiate Athletic Conference football standings
	Conf.					Overall
Team	W		L		T	W		L		T
Central Michigan +	5	–	1	–	0	8	–	1	–	0
Michigan State Normal +	5	–	1	–	0	7	–	2	–	0
Southern Illinois	4	–	1	–	1	4	–	4	–	2
Western Illinois	2	–	3	–	1	5	–	4	–	1
Illinois State Normal	2	–	3	–	1	3	–	4	–	2
Eastern Illinois	1	–	5	–	0	3	–	6	–	0
Northern Illinois State	0	–	5	–	1	0	–	8	–	1
+ – Conference co-champions

The 1955 Central Michigan Chippewas football team represented Central Michigan College, renamed Central Michigan University in 1959, in the Interstate Intercollegiate Athletic Conference (IIAC) during the 1955 college football season. In their fifth season under head coach Kenneth Kelly, the Chippewas compiled an 8–1 record (5–1 against IIAC opponents), tied for the IIAC championship shut out three of nine opponents, and outscored all opponents by a combined total of 327 to 79.

The team's statistical leaders included Mike Sweeney with 302 passing yards, Bernie Raterink with 1,044 rushing yards, and Ray Sine with 140 receiving yards. Raterink received the team's most valuable player award. Four Central Michigan players (Raterink, guard Ray Figg, center Dick Kackmeister, and end Jarv Walz) received first-team honors on the All-IIAC team. Raterink was also named most valuable player in the IIAC.

== Schedule ==
Date	Opponent	Site	Result	Attendance	Source
September 10	Pittsburg State*	Saginaw, MI	W 33–0		
September 24	Western Michigan*	Alumni Field; Mount Pleasant, MI (rivalry)	W 27–12		
October 1	at Southern Illinois	McAndrew Stadium; Carbondale, IL	L 13–14		
October 8	Northern Illinois	Alumni Field; Mount Pleasant, MI	W 61–0		
October 15	Western Illinois^{†}	Alumni Field; Mount Pleasant, MI	W 20–0	6,400	
October 22	at Illinois State Normal	McCormick Field; Normal, IL	W 35–7		
October 29	at Milwaukee State*	Milwaukee, WI	W 63–12		
November 5	at Michigan State Normal	Briggs Field; Ypsilanti, MI (rivalry)	W 27–20	5,000	
November 12	Eastern Illinois	Alumni Field; Mount Pleasant, MI	W 48–14		
*Non-conference game; ^{†}Homecoming
