= Paul Beck (American football) =

American football and baseball coach (1905–1978)

Biographical details
- Born: March 13, 1905; Fairplay, Indiana, U.S.
- Died: August 2, 1978 (aged 73); Paducah, Kentucky, U.S.

Playing career

Football
- 1926–1928: Indiana State

Coaching career (HC unless noted)

Football
- 1929–1939: Oblong HS (IL)
- 1940–1941: Thornton HS (IL) (backfield)
- 1947–1953: Evansville (line)
- 1954–1965: Evansville
- 1966–1971: Evansville (assistant)

Basketball
- 1929–1940: Oblong HS (IL)
- 1940–1942: Thornton HS (IL) (assistant)
- 1947–1971: Evansville (assistant)

Head coaching record
- Overall: 46–57 (college football)

Accomplishments and honors

Championships
- 2 ICC (1955, 1964)

Paul Beck (March 13, 1905 – August 28, 1978) was an American football and basketball coach. He served as the head football coach at the University of Evansville in Evansville, Indiana from 1954 to 1965.

A native of Worthington, Indiana, Beck attended Indiana State Teachers College—now known as Indiana State University—where he played college football for three seasons, captaining the football team in 1928 before graduating the following year. He began his coaching career in 1929 at Oblong High School in Oblong, Illinois, mentoring the football and basketball teams for 11 years. In 1940, Beck moved on to Thornton High School in Harvey, Illinois, where he was hired as backfield coach in football, assistant coach in basketball, and head coach of the track team.

Beck served in the United States Navy from 1942 to 1947, reaching the rank of lieutenant commander. He died on August 28, 1978, at Western Baptist Hospital in Paducah, Kentucky.

== Head coaching record ==
=== College football ===
Year	Team	Overall	Conference	Standing	Bowl/playoffs
Evansville Purple Aces (Indiana Collegiate Conference) (1954–1965)
1954	Evansville	5–4	4–2	T–2nd	
1955	Evansville	6–3	5–1	T–1st	
1956	Evansville	4–5	3–3	4th	
1957	Evansville	1–6	1–4	6th	
1958	Evansville	4–5	3–3	T–4th	
1959	Evansville	6–3	4–2	2nd	
1960	Evansville	5–3	4–2	2nd	
1961	Evansville	4–5	3–3	3rd	
1962	Evansville	0–9	0–6	7th	
1963	Evansville	2–6	2–4	T–5th	
1964	Evansville	4–4	4–2	T–1st	
1965	Evansville	5–4	3–3	3rd	
Evansville:		46–57	36–35		
Total:		46–57			
National championship Conference title Conference division title or championship game berth
