= 1970 Valparaiso Crusaders football team =

American college football season

1970 Valparaiso Crusaders football
- Conference: Indiana Collegiate Conference
- Record: 5–3–1 (1–3 ICC)
- Head coach: Norm Amundsen (3rd season)
- Home stadium: Brown Field

1970 Indiana Collegiate Conference football standings
	Conf.					Overall
Team	W		L		T	W		L		T
Evansville $	4	–	0	–	0	6	–	3	–	0
Saint Joseph's (IN)	3	–	1	–	0	7	–	2	–	0
Butler	2	–	2	–	0	3	–	6	–	1
Valparaiso	1	–	3	–	0	5	–	3	–	1
DePauw	0	–	4	–	0	4	–	5	–	0
$ – Conference champion

The 1970 Valparaiso Crusaders football team represented Valparaiso University as a member of the Indiana Collegiate Conference (ICC) during the 1970 NCAA College Division football season. Led by third-year head coach Norm Amundsen, the Crusaders compiled and overall record of 5–3–1 with a conference mark of 1–4, placing fourth in the ICC.

== Schedule ==
Date	Opponent	Site	Result	Source
September 19	Augustana (IL)*	Brown Field; Valparaiso, IN	W 30–14	
September 26	Illinois Wesleyan*	Brown Field; Valparaiso, IN	W 29–7	
October 3	at Saint Joseph's (IN)	Rensselaer, IN	L 19–38	
October 10	at Evansville	Evansville, IN	L 6–23	
October 17	at Wabash*	Hollett Little Giant Stadium; Crawfordsville, IN	T 14–14	
October 24	Washington University*	Brown Field; Valparaiso, IN	W 30–3	
October 31	at DePauw	Blackstock Stadium; Greencastle, IN	W 22–14	
November 7	Butler	Brown Field; Valparaiso, IN (rivalry)	L 31–34	
November 14	Wheaton (IL)*	Brown Field; Valparaiso, IN	W 57–28	
November 21	at Wagner*	Wagner College Stadium; Staten Island, NY	T 14–14	
*Non-conference game

== Roster ==
1970 Valparaiso Crusaders football team roster
Players
Coaches
Offense

Pos.	#	Name	Class
G	71	Randy Carson	Jr
G	64	Dan Kirkpatrick	Jr
OE	23	Tom Krenzke	Jr
QB	12	Ken Lass	Sr
G	68	James Maurer	Jr
OT	75	Garry Puetz	Jr
FB	32	Greg Radcliffe	So
QB	21	Greg Schultz	So
OT	74	Scott Seider	So

Defense

Pos.	#	Name	Class
DE	83	Tom Heinecke	So
DT	55	Ray Justinic	Sr
LB	37	James McDowell	So
DG	52	Curits Peil	So
DT	76	Gerald Resop	Jr

Special teams

Pos.	#	Name	Class

Head coach

- Norm Amundsen

Coordinators/assistant coaches

Legend

- (C) Team captain
- (S) Suspended
- (I) Ineligible
- Injured
- Redshirt
