= 1955 Ball State Cardinals football team =

American college football season

1955 Ball State Cardinals football
- Conference: Indiana Collegiate Conference
- Record: 3–5 (1–5 ICC)
- Head coach: George Serdula (3rd season)
- Home stadium: Ball State Field

1955 Indiana Collegiate Conference football standings
	Conf.					Overall
Team	W		L		T	W		L		T
Evansville +	5	–	1	–	0	6	–	3	–	0
Saint Joseph's (IN) +	5	–	1	–	0	6	–	3	–	0
Valparaiso	4	–	2	–	0	5	–	4	–	0
Butler	3	–	3	–	0	3	–	5	–	0
DePauw	2	–	4	–	0	5	–	4	–	0
Ball State	1	–	5	–	0	3	–	5	–	0
Indiana State	1	–	5	–	0	2	–	6	–	0
+ – Conference co-champions

The 1955 Ball State Cardinals football team was an American football team that represented Ball State Teachers College (later renamed Ball State University) in the Indiana Collegiate Conference (ICC) during the 1955 college football season. In their third and final season under head coach George Serdula, the Cardinals compiled a 3–5 record (1–5 against ICC opponents), tied for last place out of seven teams in the ICC, and were outscored by a total of 144 to 97.

== Schedule ==
Date	Time	Opponent	Site	Result	Attendance	Source
September 17		Hanover*	Ball State Field; Muncie, IN	W 39–0		
September 24		Indiana (PA)*	Ball State Field; Muncie, IN	W 13–7		
October 1	2:30 p.m.	at DePauw	Greencastle, IN	L 6–19		
October 8	2:00 p.m.	at Butler	Butler Bowl; Indianapolis, IN	L 13–20	3,714	
October 15	2:00 p.m.	Indiana State^{†}	Ball State Field; Muncie, IN (Blue Key Victory Bell)	W 19–6	10,000	
October 22	2:00 p.m.	Valparaiso	Ball State Field; Muncie, IN	L 7–26		
October 29		at Saint Joseph's (IN)	Rensselaer, IN	L 0–28		
November 5	1:30 p.m.	Evansville	Ball State Field; Muncie, IN	L 0–38		
*Non-conference game; ^{†}Homecoming; All times are in Eastern time
