= 1955 Evansville Purple Aces football team =

American college football season

1955 Evansville Purple Aces football

ICC co-champion
- Conference: Indiana Collegiate Conference
- Record: 6–3 (5–1 ICC)
- Head coach: Paul Beck (2nd season)
- Home stadium: Reitz Bowl

1955 Indiana Collegiate Conference football standings
	Conf.					Overall
Team	W		L		T	W		L		T
Evansville +	5	–	1	–	0	6	–	3	–	0
Saint Joseph's (IN) +	5	–	1	–	0	6	–	3	–	0
Valparaiso	4	–	2	–	0	5	–	4	–	0
Butler	3	–	3	–	0	3	–	5	–	0
DePauw	2	–	4	–	0	5	–	4	–	0
Ball State	1	–	5	–	0	3	–	5	–	0
Indiana State	1	–	5	–	0	2	–	6	–	0
+ – Conference co-champions

The 1955 Evansville Purple Aces football team represented Evansville College—now known as the University of Evansville—as a member of the Indiana Collegiate Conference (ICC) during the 1955 college football season. Led by second-year head coach Paul Beck, the Purple Aces compiled an overall record of 6–3 with a mark of 5–1 in conference play, sharing the ICC title with the Saint Joseph's Pumas.

== Schedule ==
Date	Time	Opponent	Site	Result	Attendance	Source
September 17	8:00 p.m.	DePauw	Reitz Bowl; Evansville, IN	W 39–7	5,000	
September 24	2:00 p.m.	at Butler	Butler Bowl; Indianapolis, IN	W 45–14		
October 1	8:00 p.m.	Eastern Illinois*	Reitz Bowl; Evansville, IN	W 40–7	12,000	
October 8	8:00 p.m.	at Valparaiso	Ames Field; Valparaiso, IN	L 18–29	3,000	
October 15	1:30 p.m.	Louisville*	Reitz Bowl; Evansville, IN	L 7–29	3,500	
October 22	8:00 p.m.	Saint Joseph's (IN)	Reitz Bowl; Evansville, IN	W 26–13		
October 29	1:30 p.m.	at Indiana State	Memorial Stadium; Terre Haute, IN	W 33–19		
November 5	12:30 p.m.	at Ball State	Ball State Field; Muncie, IN	W 38–0		
November 12		at Western Kentucky*	Bowling Green, KY	L 6–46		
*Non-conference game; All times are in Central time
