= Heartland Collegiate Conference =

Defunct American collegiate athletic conference

- Association: NCAA
- Founded: 1978
- Folded: 1990
- Commissioner: Jim Hinga (1978–1984)
- Sports fielded: 8 (initially), 1 (football-only, 1985–90)
- Division: NCAA Division II
- No. of teams: 8 (1978–83), 7 (1983–87), 6 (1987–88), 5 (1988–90)

The Heartland Collegiate Conference (HCC) was an NCAA Division II men's athletic conference that operated from 1978 to 1990. It was formed in June 1978 as the successor to the Indiana Collegiate Conference (ICC), after the ICC made up for membership losses by adding institutions from Ohio and Kentucky.

== Founding ==
The HCC had eight founding members. Five were from the final lineup of the ICC: Butler University, the University of Evansville, Valparaiso University, St. Joseph's College, and Indiana Central (which became the University of Indianapolis in 1986). They were joined by Franklin College (IN) and Georgetown College (KY), both long-time members of the National Association of Intercollegiate Athletics (NAIA), and Ashland College (today Ashland University), which had competed in Division III since the recent reorganization of the NCAA. A ninth institution, the University of Dayton, was involved in preliminary discussions in April 1978 but chose not to join the conference.

The founding of the HCC was viewed, initially, as merely a rebranding of the ICC, but the change was much more significant, in that it created a multi-sport Division II men's athletic conference that did not compete in basketball. This anomaly allowed league members Butler, Evansville, and Valparaiso to pursue membership in Division I basketball conferences while playing the rest of their sports on the Division II level, at a time when the NCAA still allowed this practice. In its first year of operation (1978–79), the HCC crowned champions in football, baseball, cross country, wrestling, swimming, track, golf, and tennis.

== History ==
The vast difference in basketball ambitions undermined the HCC from the start. While Butler, Evansville, and Valparaiso pursued Division I options for their basketball programs, Franklin and Georgetown continued to play the sport on the NAIA level. One month after the HCC was formed, its remaining three members–Indiana Central, Ashland, and St. Joseph's–became charter members of the Great Lakes Valley Conference (GLVC), initially conceived as a basketball-only league to accommodate the HCC members that played the sport in Division II. The GLVC soon duplicated HCC offerings in baseball, cross country, golf, and tennis. Meanwhile, in 1979 Butler and Evansville became charter members of the new Midwestern City Conference (today's Horizon League), and in 1982 Valparaiso joined the Mid-Continent Conference (today's Summit League). These Division I basketball-centered conferences likewise grew to sponsor other sports that duplicated the HCC.

After the NCAA absorbed the functions of the Association for Intercollegiate Athletics for Women (AIAW) in 1982, the HCC did not expand its offerings to include women's sports. Meanwhile, the GLVC added sports for women and solidified its status as primary conference for the members it shared with the HCC. Following an interim period in which most HCC members had four of their men's sports competing simultaneously in two conferences, the HCC became a football-only league for the last five years of its existence. In the spring of 1985 the HCC held its last championship tournaments in baseball and tennis and its last conference track meet. Butler won the league's last all-sports trophy, awarded in May 1985 for the 1984–85 academic year.

Even before the HCC became a football-only conference, football was considered its signature sport. Nevertheless, the league sent a team to the NCAA Division II Football Championship playoffs just three times in twelve seasons. For several years after its creation in 1973, Division II had an 8-team football postseason bracket dominated by schools that eventually moved up to the NCAA Division I Football Championship Subdivision (FCS), and HCC playoff teams did not fare well against them. In 1983, Butler (9–0–1) lost to UC Davis, 25–6, and in 1986, Ashland (9–1) lost to North Dakota State, 50–0. In 1988, the first year that the bracket was expanded to 16 teams, Butler (8–1–1) lost to Tennessee-Martin, 23–6. As the most successful programs in the HCC, Butler and Ashland each won or shared five conference football championships, but five of the eight members claimed at least one title. Indiana Central and Franklin won two apiece, and St. Joseph's won one.

== Demise ==
During the 1980s the HCC gradually dwindled from eight members to five. Georgetown, which had maintained dual membership in the NCAA and the NAIA, quit the conference to return to full NAIA membership in 1983. Four years later, Franklin, which likewise had maintained a dual membership in the NAIA, left the HCC to transition to Division III. Finally, prior to the 1988 season, Evansville withdrew from the league to become a football-only member of the NAIA (while maintaining the rest of its athletic program in Division I).

The HCC ceased operations after the 1989 football season, when Butler, Valparaiso, Indianapolis, Ashland, and St. Joseph's joined six members of the Great Lakes Intercollegiate Athletic Conference (GLIAC) to create the Midwest Intercollegiate Football Conference (MIFC). The formation of the MIFC was announced in February 1989, making the league's final season a lame duck campaign for the five remaining teams. The last HCC game was played on November 11, 1989. St. Joseph's defeated Valparaiso, 49–28.

The HCC's days would have been numbered in any event, because after the 1992 season, the NCAA no longer allowed Division I members to play football in Division II or III conferences. This compelled Butler and Valparaiso to leave the MIFC for the Division I non-scholarship Pioneer Football League in 1993. The GLIAC eventually absorbed the MIFC in 1999.

== Member schools ==
=== Final members ===
Institution	Location	Founded	Affiliation	Nickname	Joined (Note: Represents the calendar year when fall sports competition begins.)	Left (Note: Represents the calendar year when spring sports competition ends.)	Current conference
Ashland College (Note: Currently known as Ashland University, since 1989.)	Ashland, Ohio	1878	Brethren	Eagles	1978	1990	Great Midwest (G-MAC)
Butler University	Indianapolis, Indiana	1855	Nonsectarian	Bulldogs	1978	1990	Big East
Indiana Central College (Note: Currently known as the University of Indianapolis, since 1986.)	Indianapolis, Indiana	1902	United Methodist	Greyhounds	1978	1990	Great Lakes Valley (GLVC) (Great Midwest (G-MAC) in 2027)
Saint Joseph's College	Rensselaer, Indiana	1889	Catholic (C.PP.S.)	Pumas	1978	1990	N/A (Note: Saint Joseph's (Ind.) suspended operations at the end of the 2016–17 academic year. The school reopened in 2020 with limited academic offerings and no athletics program.)
Valparaiso University	Valparaiso, Indiana	1859	Lutheran	Crusaders	1978	1990	Missouri Valley (MVC)

=== Former members ===
Institution	Location	Founded	Affiliation	Nickname	Joined (Note: Represents the calendar year when fall sports competition begins.)	Left (Note: Represents the calendar year when spring sports competition ends.)	Current conference
University of Evansville	Evansville, Indiana	1854	United Methodist	Purple Aces	1978	1988	Missouri Valley (MVC)
Franklin College	Franklin, Indiana	1834	Baptist (ABCUSA)	Grizzlies	1978	1987	Heartland (HCAC)
Georgetown College	Georgetown, Kentucky	1829	Baptist (KBC)	Tigers	1978	1983	Mid-South (MSC)

=== Membership timeline ===
Full member (all sports) Full member (non-football) Associate member (football only) Associate member (sport)

== Football champions ==
- 1978 – Indiana Central
- 1979 – Saint Joseph's (IN)
- 1980 – Ashland and Franklin
- 1981 – Franklin and Indiana Central
- 1982 – Ashland
- 1983 – Butler
- 1984 – Ashland
- 1985 – Ashland and Butler
- 1986 – Ashland
- 1987 – Butler
- 1988 – Butler
- 1989 – Butler

== Football standings ==
1978 Heartland Collegiate Conference standings
	Conf.					Overall
Team	W		L		T	W		L		T
Indiana Central $	4	–	2	–	0	6	–	3	–	0
Valparaiso	3	–	2	–	0	5	–	4	–	0
Saint Joseph's (IN)	3	–	2	–	0	5	–	4	–	1
Butler	3	–	2	–	0	5	–	5	–	0
Evansville	2	–	3	–	0	2	–	9	–	0
Franklin (IN)	1	–	6	–	0	1	–	9	–	0
Georgetown (KY) *	1	–	1	–	0	5	–	4	–	0
Ashland *	1	–	0	–	0	2	–	8	–	0
$ – Conference champion; * – ineligible for conference title

1979 Heartland Collegiate Conference standings
	Conf.					Overall
Team	W		L		T	W		L		T
Saint Joseph's (IN) $	4	–	1	–	0	8	–	2	–	0
Franklin (IN)	5	–	2	–	0	6	–	4	–	0
Butler	3	–	2	–	0	5	–	5	–	0
Valparaiso	2	–	3	–	0	5	–	4	–	0
Indiana Central	2	–	4	–	0	3	–	6	–	0
Evansville	0	–	6	–	0	2	–	9	–	0
Georgetown (KY) *	3	–	0	–	0	4	–	6	–	0
Ashland *	0	–	1	–	0	3	–	6	–	0
$ – Conference champion; * – ineligible for conference title

1980 Heartland Collegiate Conference standings
	Conf.					Overall
Team	W		L		T	W		L		T
Franklin (IN) +	5	–	2	–	0	8	–	2	–	0
Ashland +	5	–	2	–	0	6	–	3	–	1
Saint Joseph's (IN)	4	–	3	–	0	6	–	4	–	0
Indiana Central	3	–	3	–	1	5	–	4	–	2
Georgetown (KY)	3	–	4	–	0	4	–	5	–	0
Butler	3	–	4	–	0	4	–	6	–	0
Evansville	3	–	4	–	0	3	–	7	–	0
Valparaiso	1	–	5	–	1	3	–	6	–	1
+ – Conference co-champions

1981 Heartland Collegiate Conference standings
	Conf.					Overall
Team	W		L		T	W		L		T
Franklin (IN) +	6	–	1	–	0	8	–	2	–	0
Indiana Central +	6	–	1	–	0	7	–	4	–	0
Saint Joseph's (IN)	5	–	2	–	0	6	–	3	–	0
Ashland	5	–	2	–	0	6	–	4	–	0
Butler	2	–	5	–	0	3	–	7	–	0
Evansville	2	–	5	–	0	3	–	8	–	0
Georgetown (KY)	1	–	6	–	0	1	–	9	–	0
Valparaiso	1	–	6	–	0	1	–	9	–	0
+ – Conference co-champions

1982 Heartland Collegiate Conference standings
	Conf.					Overall
Team	W		L		T	W		L		T
Ashland $	6	–	1	–	0	8	–	2	–	0
Butler	5	–	2	–	0	7	–	3	–	0
Evansville	5	–	2	–	0	6	–	4	–	0
Franklin (IN)	5	–	2	–	0	6	–	4	–	0
Indiana Central	3	–	4	–	0	4	–	6	–	0
Saint Joseph's (IN)	2	–	5	–	0	4	–	6	–	0
Valparaiso	1	–	6	–	0	3	–	7	–	0
Georgetown (KY)	1	–	6	–	0	2	–	8	–	0
$ – Conference champion

1983 Heartland Collegiate Conference standings
	Conf.					Overall
Team	W		L		T	W		L		T
Butler $^	5	–	0	–	1	9	–	1	–	1
Indiana Central	4	–	1	–	1	6	–	3	–	1
Evansville	2	–	1	–	3	3	–	4	–	3
Ashland	2	–	4	–	0	5	–	5	–	0
Franklin (IN)	2	–	4	–	0	4	–	6	–	0
Valparaiso	2	–	4	–	0	4	–	6	–	0
Saint Joseph's (IN)	1	–	4	–	1	2	–	7	–	1
$ – Conference champion; ^ – NCAA Division II playoff participant

1984 Heartland Collegiate Conference standings
	Conf.					Overall
Team	W		L		T	W		L		T
Ashland $	5	–	0	–	1	6	–	3	–	1
Indiana Central	4	–	2	–	0	8	–	2	–	0
Butler	4	–	2	–	0	6	–	4	–	0
Franklin (IN)	3	–	2	–	1	5	–	4	–	1
Valparaiso	2	–	4	–	0	6	–	4	–	0
Saint Joseph's (IN)	1	–	5	–	0	2	–	7	–	0
Evansville	1	–	5	–	0	2	–	8	–	0
$ – Conference champion

1985 Heartland Collegiate Conference standings
	Conf.					Overall
Team	W		L		T	W		L		T
Butler +	5	–	1	–	0	8	–	2	–	0
Ashland +	5	–	1	–	0	6	–	4	–	0
Indiana Central	4	–	1	–	1	7	–	1	–	2
Valparaiso	2	–	4	–	0	6	–	4	–	0
Saint Joseph's (IN)	2	–	4	–	0	3	–	7	–	0
Franklin (IN)	1	–	4	–	1	5	–	4	–	1
Evansville	1	–	5	–	0	2	–	8	–	0
+ – Conference co-champions

1986 Heartland Collegiate Conference standings
	Conf.					Overall
Team	W		L		T	W		L		T
Ashland $^	6	–	0	–	0	9	–	2	–	0
Indianapolis	5	–	1	–	0	7	–	2	–	0
Butler	3	–	3	–	0	5	–	5	–	0
Valparaiso	3	–	3	–	0	3	–	7	–	0
Saint Joseph's (IN)	2	–	4	–	0	6	–	4	–	0
Franklin (IN)	2	–	4	–	0	3	–	7	–	0
Evansville	0	–	6	–	0	2	–	8	–	0
$ – Conference champion; ^ – NCAA Division II playoff participant

1987 Heartland Collegiate Conference standings
	Conf.					Overall
Team	W		L		T	W		L		T
Butler $	4	–	0	–	1	8	–	1	–	1
Ashland	3	–	1	–	1	7	–	2	–	1
Indianapolis	3	–	2	–	0	6	–	4	–	0
Valparaiso	2	–	3	–	0	3	–	6	–	0
Saint Joseph's (IN)	1	–	3	–	1	5	–	4	–	1
Evansville	0	–	4	–	1	4	–	5	–	1
$ – Conference champion

1988 Heartland Collegiate Conference standings
	Conf.					Overall
Team	W		L		T	W		L		T
Butler $^	3	–	0	–	1	8	–	2	–	1
Saint Joseph's (IN)	3	–	1	–	0	4	–	6	–	0
Ashland	2	–	2	–	0	6	–	4	–	0
Indianapolis	1	–	2	–	1	5	–	4	–	1
Valparaiso	0	–	4	–	0	0	–	9	–	1
$ – Conference champion; ^ – NCAA Division II playoff participant

1989 Heartland Collegiate Conference standings
	Conf.					Overall
Team	W		L		T	W		L		T
Butler $	4	–	0	–	0	7	–	2	–	1
Ashland	2	–	2	–	0	6	–	4	–	0
Indianapolis	2	–	2	–	0	4	–	5	–	0
Saint Joseph's (IN)	2	–	2	–	0	4	–	6	–	0
Valparaiso	0	–	4	–	0	0	–	10	–	0
$ – Conference champion

== See also ==
- List of defunct college football conferences
