= 1953 Ball State Cardinals football team =

American college football season

1953 Ball State Cardinals football
- Conference: Indiana Collegiate Conference
- Record: 5–2–1 (3–2 ICC)
- Head coach: George Serdula (1st season)

1953 Indiana Collegiate Conference football standings
	Conf.					Overall
Team	W		L		T	W		L		T
Butler $	5	–	0	–	0	6	–	2	–	0
Valparaiso	3	–	2	–	0	5	–	2	–	1
Ball State	3	–	2	–	0	5	–	2	–	1
Indiana State	2	–	3	–	0	5	–	3	–	0
Evansville	2	–	3	–	0	3	–	7	–	0
Saint Joseph's (IN)	0	–	5	–	0	2	–	6	–	0
DePauw	0	–	0	–	0	0	–	7	–	1
$ – Conference champion

The 1953 Ball State Cardinals football team was an American football team that represented Ball State Teachers College (later renamed Ball State University) in the Indiana Collegiate Conference (ICC) during the 1953 college football season. In their first season under head coach George Serdula, the Cardinals compiled a 5–2–1 record (3–2 against ICC opponents).

== Schedule ==
Date	Opponent	Site	Result	Attendance	Source
September 19	Hanover*	Ball State Field; Muncie, IN	T 13–13		
September 26	James Millikin*	Ball State Field; Muncie, IN	W 19–13		
October 3	at DePauw	Blackstock Field; Greencastle, IN	W 28–7		
October 10	at Butler	Butler Bowl; Indianapolis, IN	L 7–25		
October 17	Indiana State	Ball State Field; Muncie, IN (Blue Key Victory Bell)	W 33–6		
October 22	vs. Valparaiso	Michigan City, IN	L 7–27	4,200	
October 31	at Saint Joseph's (IN)	Rensselaer, IN	W 14–6	2,100	
November 7	Evansville	Ball State Field; Muncie, IN	W 42–28		
*Non-conference game
