= 1955 Washington University Bears football team =

American college football season

1955 Washington University Bears football
- Conference: Independent
- Record: 5–4
- Head coach: Carl Snavely (3rd season)
- Home stadium: Francis Field

1955 Midwestern college football independents records
	Conf.			Overall
Team	W	L	T	W		L		T
Ferris Institute		–		6	–	1	–	0
No. 9 Notre Dame		–		8	–	2	–	0
Xavier		–		7	–	2	–	0
Carthage		–		6	–	2	–	0
Wabash		–		5	–	3	–	1
Michigan Tech		–		4	–	3	–	0
Washington University		–		5	–	4	–	0
Drake		–		4	–	4	–	0
Youngstown		–		4	–	5	–	0
Dayton		–		3	–	6	–	0
Marquette		–		2	–	6	–	1
Baldwin–Wallace		–		2	–	6	–	0
Cincinnati		–		1	–	6	–	2
Rose Poly		–		1	–	6	–	1
Northern Michigan		–		0	–	7	–	0
Rankings from AP Poll

The 1955 Washington University Bears football team represented Washington University in St. Louis as an independent during the 1955 college football season. Led by third-year head coach Carl Snavely, the Bears compiled a record of 5–4. Washington University played home games at Francis Field in St. Louis.

== Schedule ==
Date	Time	Opponent	Site	TV	Result	Attendance	Source
September 24		Missouri Mines	Francis Field; St. Louis, MO		L 13–20		
October 1		Wabash	Francis Field; St. Louis, MO		W 20–14	4,500	
October 8	2:00 p.m.	Drake	Francis Field; St. Louis, MO	KSD-TV	L 19–39		
October 15		at Western Reserve	Clarke Field; Cleveland, OH		L 6–9	1,200	
October 22		at Western Michigan	Waldo Stadium; Kalamazoo, MI		W 26–14	8,000	
October 29		Washington and Lee^{†}	Francis Field; St. Louis, MO		W 27–0	7,500	
November 5		at Southern Illinois	McAndrew Stadium; Carbondale, IL		W 32–13	9,400	
November 12	2:00 p.m.	Butler	Francis Field; St. Louis, MO	KDS-TV	W 41–20		
November 19		Bradley	Francis Field; St. Louis, MO		L 20–27	2,500	
^{†}Homecoming; All times are in Central time
