= 1955 Eastern Illinois Panthers football team =

American college football season

1955 Eastern Illinois Panthers football
- Conference: Interstate Intercollegiate Athletic Conference
- Record: 3–6 (1–5 IIAC)
- Head coach: Maynard O'Brien (9th season)
- Home stadium: Lincoln Field

1955 Interstate Intercollegiate Athletic Conference football standings
	Conf.					Overall
Team	W		L		T	W		L		T
Central Michigan +	5	–	1	–	0	8	–	1	–	0
Michigan State Normal +	5	–	1	–	0	7	–	2	–	0
Southern Illinois	4	–	1	–	1	4	–	4	–	2
Western Illinois	2	–	3	–	1	5	–	4	–	1
Illinois State Normal	2	–	3	–	1	3	–	4	–	2
Eastern Illinois	1	–	5	–	0	3	–	6	–	0
Northern Illinois State	0	–	5	–	1	0	–	8	–	1
+ – Conference co-champions

The 1955 Eastern Illinois Panthers football team represented Eastern Illinois State College—now known as Eastern Illinois University—as a member of the Interstate Intercollegiate Athletic Conference (IIAC) during the 1955 college football season. Led by Maynard O'Brien in his ninth and final year head coach, the Panthers compiled an overall record of 3–6 with a mark of 1–5 in conference play, placing sixth in the IIAC.

== Schedule ==
Date	Time	Opponent	Site	Result	Attendance	Source
September 24	2:00 p.m.	Kalamazoo*	Lincoln Field; Charleston, IL	W 15–0		
October 1	8:00 p.m.	at Evansville*	Reitz Bowl; Evansville, IN	L 7–40	12,000	
October 8		at Illinois State Normal	McCormick Field; Normal, IL (rivalry)	L 13–16		
October 15		at Southern Illinois	McAndrew Stadium; Carbondale, IL	L 13–26		
October 22		Indiana State*	Lincoln Field; Charleston, IL	W 33–13		
October 29		Michigan State Normal	Lincoln Field; Charleston, IL	L 7–14		
November 5		Northern Illinois State	Lincoln Field; Charleston, IL	W 14–0		
November 12		at Central Michigan	Alumni Field; Mount Pleasant, MI	L 14–48		
November 19	1:30 p.m.	Western Illinois	Lincoln Field; Charleston, IL	L 7–13		
*Non-conference game; All times are in Central time
