= Arad McCutchan =

American basketball coach (1912–1993)

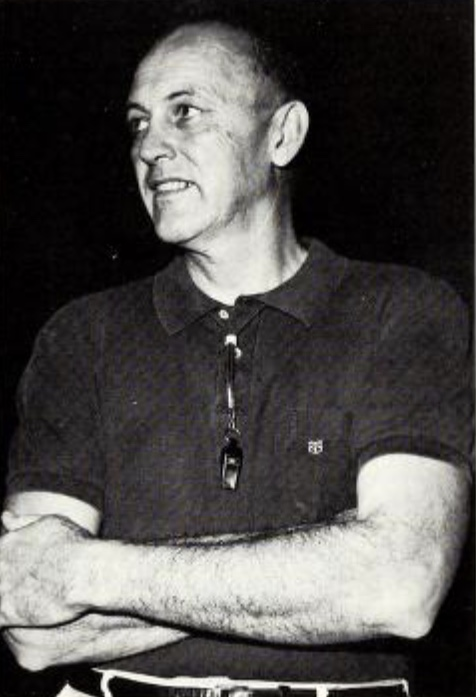
- McCutchan in 1965

Biographical details
- Born: July 4, 1912; Evansville, Indiana, U.S.
- Died: June 16, 1993 (aged 80); Santa Claus, Indiana, U.S.

Coaching career (HC unless noted)
- 1936–1943: Benjamin Bosse HS
- 1946–1977: Evansville

Head coaching record
- Overall: 514–314 (college)

Accomplishments and honors

Championships
- 5 NCAA College Division (1959, 1960, 1964, 1965, 1971)
- Basketball Hall of Fame; Inducted in 1981 (profile)
- College Basketball Hall of Fame; Inducted in 2006

Arad A. McCutchan (July 4, 1912 – June 16, 1993) was a collegiate basketball coach. The Evansville, Indiana, native coached his hometown University of Evansville from 1946 to 1977, guiding the Purple Aces to a 514–314 record.

McCutchan spent seven years coaching Benjamin Bosse High School (1936–1943) before serving in the United States Navy during World War II. In 1946, he took over the head coaching position at the University of Evansville. In the following years he guided them to five NCAA College Division Basketball Championships (1959, 1960, 1964, 1965, 1971) and three undefeated seasons in their conference (1964, 1965, 1971). McCutchan was named NCAA College Division Coach of the Year two times (1964, 1965). He was an assistant coach to Gene Bartow for the US national team in the 1974 FIBA World Championship, where he won the bronze medal. On April 27, 1981, he was elected to the Naismith Memorial Basketball Hall of Fame. He was inducted into the Indiana Basketball Hall of Fame in 1973. After retiring from coaching, he and his wife Virginia moved to Santa Claus, Indiana.

His first name, Arad, was inherited from a grandfather named from the Bible. He often said the name was Hebrew for "wild ass".

== See also ==
- Arad McCutchan Stadium
