= 1955 Wabash Little Giants football team =

American college football season

1955 Wabash Little Giants football
- Conference: Independent
- Record: 5–3–1
- Head coach: Garland Frazier (5th season)
- Home stadium: Ingalls Field

1955 Midwestern college football independents records
	Conf.			Overall
Team	W	L	T	W		L		T
Ferris Institute		–		6	–	1	–	0
No. 9 Notre Dame		–		8	–	2	–	0
Xavier		–		7	–	2	–	0
Carthage		–		6	–	2	–	0
Wabash		–		5	–	3	–	1
Michigan Tech		–		4	–	3	–	0
Washington University		–		5	–	4	–	0
Drake		–		4	–	4	–	0
Youngstown		–		4	–	5	–	0
Dayton		–		3	–	6	–	0
Marquette		–		2	–	6	–	1
Baldwin–Wallace		–		2	–	6	–	0
Cincinnati		–		1	–	6	–	2
Rose Poly		–		1	–	6	–	1
Northern Michigan		–		0	–	7	–	0
Rankings from AP Poll

The 1955 Wabash Little Giants football team represented Wabash College as an independent during the 1955 college football season. Led by fifth-year head coach Garland Frazier, the Little Giants compiled a record of 5–3–1.

== Schedule ==
Date	Time	Opponent	Site	Result	Attendance	Source
September 17	1:30 p.m.	Valparaiso	Ingalls Field; Crawfordsville, IN	W 26–14		
September 24		Albion	Ingalls Field; Crawfordsville, IN	W 13–7		
October 1		at Washington University	Francis Field; St. Louis, MO	L 14–20	4,500	
October 8		at Beloit	Beloit, WI	L 13–19		
October 15		Ohio Wesleyan	Ingalls Field; Crawfordsville, IN	W 27–14		
October 22		Sewanee	Ingalls Field; Crawfordsville, IN	W 37–0	3,000	
October 29		at Carroll (WI)	Waukesha, WI	T 7–7		
November 5	2:30 p.m.	Butler	Ingalls Field; Crawfordsville, IN	W 14–12		
November 12		at DePauw	Greencastle, IN (Monon Bell)	L 20–23	4,000	
All times are in Central time
