= 1955 Drake Bulldogs football team =

American college football season

1955 Drake Bulldogs football
- Conference: Independent
- Record: 4–4
- Head coach: Warren Gaer (7th season)
- Home stadium: Drake Stadium

1955 Midwestern college football independents records
	Conf.			Overall
Team	W	L	T	W		L		T
Ferris Institute		–		6	–	1	–	0
No. 9 Notre Dame		–		8	–	2	–	0
Xavier		–		7	–	2	–	0
Carthage		–		6	–	2	–	0
Wabash		–		5	–	3	–	1
Michigan Tech		–		4	–	3	–	0
Washington University		–		5	–	4	–	0
Drake		–		4	–	4	–	0
Youngstown		–		4	–	5	–	0
Dayton		–		3	–	6	–	0
Marquette		–		2	–	6	–	1
Baldwin–Wallace		–		2	–	6	–	0
Cincinnati		–		1	–	6	–	2
Rose Poly		–		1	–	6	–	1
Northern Michigan		–		0	–	7	–	0
Rankings from AP Poll

The 1955 Drake Bulldogs football team was an American football team that represented Drake University as an independent during the 1955 college football season. Led by seventh-year head coach Warren Gaer, the Bulldogs compiled a record of 4–4.

== Schedule ==
Date	Time	Opponent	Site	TV	Result	Attendance	Source
September 16		North Dakota State	Drake Stadium; Des Moines, IA		W 28–6		
September 23		at Denver	Hilltop Stadium; Denver, CO		L 7–33	21,500	
September 30		Iowa State Teachers	Drake Stadium; Des Moines, IA		L 14–21	4,000	
October 8	2:00 p.m.	at Washington University	Francis Field; St. Louis, MO	KSD-TV	W 39–19		
October 15	7:30 p.m.	at Boston University	Boston University Field; Boston, MA		L 2–32	3,000	
October 22	2:00 p.m.	at Bradley	Peoria, IL		W 40–7	5,000	
October 29		Iowa State^{†}	Drake Stadium; Des Moines, IA		W 27–21	8,500	
November 12		at Wichita	Veterans Field; Wichita, KS		L 6–59	13,971	
^{†}Homecoming; All times are in Central time
