= Jim Hinga =

American basketball player and coach (1923–2002)

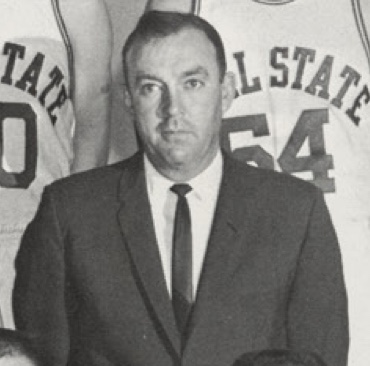
- Hinga from the 1964 Orient

Biographical details
- Born: December 17, 1923; Fort Wayne, Indiana, U.S.
- Died: March 11, 2002 (aged 78); Naples, Florida, U.S.

Playing career
- 1944–1946: Purdue
- Position: Guard

Coaching career (HC unless noted)
- 1954–1968: Ball State

Jim Hinga (December 17, 1923 – March 11, 2002) was an American college basketball coach. Hinga coached Ball State University from 1954 to 1968 and compiled a 154–169 career mark, which is still a school record for victories. He also was an assistant football and track coach and Ball State's manager of physical education and athletic facilities and services from 1969 to 1981.

== Playing career ==
=== High school ===
Hinga helped his team to a three-year record of 21–2–2 (.920). In his junior season in 1939–40, he was named an all-state football end while leading the Redskins to the Associated Press and United Press International state title. His teammate, Robert Cowan, would go on to a three-year career in the National Football League. Hinga was also a member of the two-time IHSAA state champion track and field team and won the 440-yard race.

=== College ===
He attended Purdue University and played football and track as a freshman during the 1942–43 school year. Hinga then joined the United States Air Force during World War II. He returned to Purdue in the fall of 1944 then played basketball for head coach Piggy Lambert. Two teammates who would go on to successful playing careers were Paul Hoffman and Howie Williams.

== Coaching career ==
=== High school ===
Hinga, who previously coached basketball, football and track at West Lafayette and Fort Wayne North High Schools from 1947 to 1954, was inducted into the Indiana Basketball Hall of Fame in 1983. He was the head basketball coach and assistant football coach under former high school teammate Bob Cowan at their alma mater.

=== College ===
Hinga was named the head basketball coach at Ball State Teachers College in the fall of 1954. He coached for 14 seasons (still the longest tenure Ball State men's basketball coaching tenure in program history) and built a record of 154–169 (.477). Following his resignation, he was hired to be the first full-time commissioner of the Indiana Collegiate Conference from 1970 until 1978, when it became the Heartland Conference; he then continued as commissioner until retiring in 1984.

His third team in 1956–57 would achieve a record of 19–8 (7–5 in the ICC). The squad would be the first to represent the university in any postseason tournament as it advanced to the 1957 NAIA Division I men's basketball tournament. Once in Kansas City, the Cardinals ran past Troy State by 28 points but could not get past a tough Texas Southern squad, dropping their second-round game, 97–72. The Cardinals were led by Tom Dobbs and his 17.0 points per game average.

After ten seasons at Ball State, Hinga led the Cardinals back to the post-season as they participated in the 1964 NCAA Men's Division II basketball tournament. The Cardinals dropped both games to place fourth in the region. The Cardinals were led by Ed Butler, their all-time leader in rebounds, who would be named to the Ball State Hall of Fame in 1979.

After 14 seasons at Ball State, Hinga was hired as the full-time commissioner of the Indiana Collegiate Conference, he led the conference from its transition from a hybrid conference (a mix of NCAA Division I, II, and III schools) to a primarily NCAA Division II and III conference and a re-branding as the "Heartland Conference" as it admitted its first non-Indiana based university. Hinga was the first commissioner of the Heartland Collegiate Conference and presided until 1984.

== Head coaching record ==
Record table
Season	Team	Overall	Conference	Standing	Postseason
Indiana State_Muncee Hoosieroons (Indiana Collegiate Conference) (1954–1968)
1954–55	Ball State	8–12	5–7	4th	
1955–56	Ball State	10–14	2–10	6th	
1956–57	Ball State	19–8	7–5	2nd	NAIA Second Round
1957–58	Ball State	13–11	5–7	3rd	
1958–59	Ball State	7–15	3–9	6th	
1959–60	Ball State	5–17	2–10	7th	
1960–61	Ball State	12–11	5–7	5th	
1961–62	Ball State	12–10	3–9	6th	
1962–63	Ball State	15–9	6–6	4th	
1963–64	Ball State	17–8	9–3	2nd	NCAA College Division Tournament
1964–65	Ball State	9–13	5–7	3rd	
1965–66	Ball State	10–15	4–8	5th	
1966–67	Ball State	7–14	4–8	6th	
1967–68	Ball State	10–12	5–7	5th	
Ball State:		154–169 (.477)	65–103 (.387)		
Total:		154–169 (.477)			
National champion Postseason invitational champion Conference regular season champion Conference regular season and conference tournament champion Division regular season champion Division regular season and conference tournament champion Conference tournament champion
