= Indiana Collegiate Conference =

Defunct American collegiate athletic conference

- Association: NCAA, NAIA
- Founded: 1950
- Folded: 1978
- Commissioner: Jim Hinga (1968–1978)
- Sports fielded: 9
- Division: NCAA College Division and Division II (most teams, in most sports), NAIA
- No. of teams: 7 (most years), 9 (total)
- Headquarters: Terre Haute, Indiana
- Region: Wabash-Ohio River Valley

The Indiana Collegiate Conference (ICC) was a men's college athletic conference in the United States, in existence from 1950 to 1978. It consisted solely of schools in Indiana.

The charter members of the conference were Indiana State University, Butler University, Valparaiso University, the University of Evansville, Ball State University, and Saint Joseph's College (Indiana), joined in 1953 by DePauw University.

== History ==
The ICC was an offshoot of the older, larger Indiana Intercollegiate Conference (IIC), which dated from 1922 but began to fall apart in the aftermath of World War II. Preliminary discussions leading to its creation began after eight smaller IIC members broke away to form the Hoosier College Conference (HCC) in 1947. Finally, on February 17, 1950, the presidents of the original six ICC members authorized the creation of the conference, with details finalized that October and November. These included plans to crown a basketball champion in 1950–51 and champions in football, basketball, track, golf, and tennis in 1951–52, with a balanced round-robin schedule in football and double round-robin in basketball.

Prior to forming the ICC, three of its founding members had reacted to the crumbling of the IIC by pursuing concurrent membership in other conferences: Butler in the Mid-American Conference (MAC), Evansville in the Ohio Valley Conference (OVC), and St. Joseph's in the Midlands Intercollegiate Athletic Conference (MIAC). Initially, it was unclear how these commitments would affect the new league. Evansville ultimately did not play enough ICC games to be eligible for the first basketball title, and was not integrated into the league in football until 1952. Fortunately, Butler (which quit the MAC in 1950) and St. Joseph's (which remained in the MIAC until 1954) had no such issues. The belated addition of DePauw, admitted in January 1953, further delayed the scheduling ideal, as the Tigers were not fully integrated into ICC football until 1955.

Indiana State and Ball State, the only public universities among the ICC's founding members, were also the only public institutions ever to belong to the conference. They also eventually grew to be, by far, the largest schools in the conference, but as of the early 1950s they saw themselves as having a great deal in common athletically with the private schools of the league, sharing with them a middle ground between the state's traditional "big three" major-college programs—Indiana, Purdue, and Notre Dame—and the smaller schools that had formed the HCC.

Despite their similarities, ICC members did not always compete in the same division or association. After the National Collegiate Athletic Association (NCAA) subdivided into a University Division and a College Division in 1956–57, Butler competed in University Division while the rest of the ICC opted for College Division. Some ICC members also held dual membership in the NCAA and the National Association of Intercollegiate Athletics (NAIA), most notably Indiana State, Ball State, and St. Joseph's. Butler routinely played a major-college non-conference basketball schedule, qualifying for the National Invitation Tournament (NIT) twice and the NCAA basketball tournament once. Meanwhile, Evansville won the NCAA College Division tournament five times, and Indiana State was College Division tournament runner-up once. The Sycamores also participated in five NAIA national basketball tournaments, posting one third-place national finish, and St. Joseph's was crowned NAIA football co-champion in 1956.

The ICC was guided by various commissioners during its early years. The first full-time commissioner, Jim Hinga, was not hired until 1968; prior to his selection, the position was filled by part-time commissioners, including LeRoy Heminger of Franklin College. In addition, the conference maintained a rotating presidency, filled by long-time educational administrators including Dr. Joseph Nygaard of Indianapolis and S.T. "Cy" Proffitt of Terre Haute.

=== Individual sports ===
==== Football ====
The conference celebrated its football glory years in the 1950s and 1960s. Butler led the way with fourteen conference titles. Valparaiso played in the 1950 Cigar Bowl (against Wisconsin-La Crosse) following an undefeated regular season. Saint Joseph's won a share of the 1956 NAIA Football National Championship by playing to a 0–0 tie with Montana State in the Aluminum Bowl following an undefeated regular season. Ball State played in the NCAA College Division's Mideast regional postseason game, the Grantland Rice Bowl, in 1965 (against Tennessee State) and in 1967 (against Eastern Kentucky).

ICC alumni who went on to play pro football include Fuzzy Thurston (Valparaiso), lineman on five Green Bay Packers NFL championship teams, and Timmy Brown (Ball State), who had a ten-year career in the NFL, most of it with the Philadelphia Eagles. Former ICC football players who went on to become college football coaches include Jim Wacker (Valparaiso), Bill Lynch (Butler), Bill Doba (Ball State), and Bob Bartolomeo (Butler). Future college basketball coach Norm Ellenberger also played football at Butler.

==== Basketball ====
The 1960s were the pinnacle of ICC basketball, especially for the Evansville Purple Aces, who under legendary coach Arad McCutchan won NCAA College Division national titles in 1959, 1960, 1964, 1965 and 1971. McCutchan was named the National College Division Coach of the Year in 1964 and 1965. Evansville enjoyed a home court advantage in its five championship game victories, as it hosted the finals of all 17 NCAA College Division basketball tournaments at Roberts Municipal Stadium, from the 1956–57 season through 1972–73.

Competing in the NCAA University Division under the direction of Tony Hinkle, the Butler Bulldogs made the NIT field in 1958, losing in the first round, and again in 1959, losing in the second (quarterfinal) round. The 1962 Butler squad qualified for the NCAA tournament, advancing to the round of sixteen.

The 1967–68 season was especially memorable for the ICC. The Indiana State Sycamores were College Division national finalists, and four ICC players were named All-Americans: Jerry Newsom of Indiana State (1st team), Tom Niemeier of Evansville (2nd team), Dick Jones of Valparaiso (3rd team), and Howie Pratt of Evansville (3rd team).

The ICC had many legendary coaches over the years; in addition to Arad McCutchen (Evansville) and Tony Hinkle (Butler), these included John Longfellow (Indiana State), Gene Bartow (Valparaiso), and Duane Klueh (Indiana State).

The most notable ICC players included Hugh Ahlering, Jerry Sloan, Ed Smallwood, Don Buse, and Larry Humes (all of Evansville), Jerry Newsom, Butch Wade, and Steve Newton (all of Indiana State), Billy Shepherd (Butler), Bobby Plump (Butler), and Don Bielke (Valparaiso). Seven ICC players were awarded the NCAA College Division MVP/MOP Award between the 1957–58 and 1970–71 seasons: Smallwood (1958, 1960), Ahlering (1959), Sloan (1964, 1965), Newsom (1968), and Buse (1971). Cal Luther played at Valparaiso before beginning a long and successful college coaching career. St. Joseph's Jim Thordsen was the conference MVP in 1973, 1974 and 1975, and was also named a Division II All-American. Sloan, Buse, and Shepherd went on to play professionally in the NBA and/or ABA, with Sloan eventually becoming most famous for his long tenure as coach of the Utah Jazz.

Long-time NCAA basketball officials Ted Hillary and Steve "Whale" Welmer are alumni of Saint Joseph's and Evansville, respectively.

The ICC posted 88 "1,000+ career scorers" in basketball. The leading scorer in the history of the conference is Evansville's legendary Larry Humes, who finished his outstanding career with 2,236 points.

==== Baseball ====
Future college basketball coach Norm Ellenberger (Butler) was an All-ICC pitcher and the conference's baseball MVP in 1954. Future college football coach Dick Tomey was a baseball star at DePauw. Future college basketball coach Wayne Boultinghouse (Evansville) was the baseball MVP in 1964, then spent four seasons in the St. Louis Cardinals farm system before beginning his basketball coaching career. Merv Rettenmund (Ball State) played both baseball and football in the ICC before moving on to become a steady performer for the Baltimore Orioles and Cincinnati Reds. He played in four World Series, winning titles with the 1969 Orioles and 1975 Reds. His Ball State teammate Steve Hargan played twelve seasons in the major leagues, mostly with the Cleveland Indians. Both starred in the ICC under coach Ray Louthen.

Valparaiso won 17 ICC baseball titles, with 15 coming under the leadership of long-time coach Emory G. Bauer. He led the Crusaders to 11 NCAA tournament appearances, with 5 coming in the NCAA Division I tournament. Indiana State was also dominant in ICC baseball, winning titles in 1957, 1958, 1964, and 1966 under coach Paul Wolf, who was named the ICC Coach of the Year in 1958, 1963, 1966 and 1967. Wolf also sent players Jeff James and Danny Lazar to the major leagues.

==== Golf ====
Future Vice President of the United States Dan Quayle was a three-time letterman (1967–69) on the varsity golf team at DePauw. Quayle finished 10th in the conference tournament as a sophomore. Indiana State won the ICC in 1953, 1966, 1967 and 1968. The Sycamores also won an NAIA Regional in 1953 and 1962, advancing to the NAIA National Tournament.

Ball State University hosted the NAIA National Tournament during the 1957–58, 1958–59 and 1959–60 seasons, and placed 5th in the NCAA National Tournament in 1968.

==== Swimming and diving ====
Evansville won the most ICC swimming titles, with eight. Indiana State's program featured five NAIA individual champions during the 1962–63, 1963–64 and 1964–65 seasons.

==== Track and field ====
In 1968, the Indiana State Mile Relay team participated in the NCAA Finals. The team was undefeated during the season, winning their event at the ICC meet, the "Big State" meet (including ICC members plus Indiana, Purdue, and Notre Dame), the IU relays, the Mason-Dixon Games (Louisville, KY), and the Central Collegiate Conference meet. The relay team members were Peter Howe, Tom Walters, Rich Rardin, and Errol White.

==== Wrestling ====
Indiana State produced 12 NAIA All-Americans, finishing in the top ten at the NAIA National Championships three times in six seasons before being re-classified as an NCAA University Division program. The Sycamores hosted the NAIA National meet in 1964–65. Indiana State subsequently produced 2 NCAA All-Americans and participated in the NCAA National Championships before withdrawing from the conference following the 1967–68 season. Newcomer Indiana Central dominated ICC wrestling in the 1970s, winning six of the last eight conference championships.

== Final years and aftermath ==
Ball State and Indiana State left the conference in 1968. Following a brief stint in the short-lived Midwestern Conference from 1970 to 1972, Ball State went on to join the Mid-American Conference and Indiana State joined the Missouri Valley Conference.

After competing as a five-team league in 1968–69 and 1969–70, the ICC returned to seven members by adding Wabash College and the University of Indianapolis (then known as Indiana Central) in 1970. Wabash considered joining the conference in 1953, but instead competed as an independent throughout the 1950s and 1960s. Indiana Central, a founding member of the HCC in 1947, had to transition to the NCAA from the NAIA. Both programs were not fully integrated into ICC schedules until 1972–73.

In August 1973, the NCAA reorganized into its present three divisions (I, II, and III). This created issues ultimately too great for the ICC to overcome, even though the NCAA initially allowed its members to compete in different divisions in different sports, and allowed five years for everyone to meet the qualifications of their primary division. Butler's University Division membership in basketball carried over into Division I, but most of the rest of the ICC played the sport in Division II. After hosting the finals of all 17 College Division basketball tournaments (1957 through 1973), Evansville hosted the first three for Division II (1974 through 1976). St. Joseph's qualified for the Division II tournament four times (1974, 1975, 1976, 1978) and Evansville twice (1974 and 1976). Meanwhile, the Division III football playoffs included Evansville in 1974 and Indiana Central in 1975, even as both were transitioning away from non-scholarship football.

After Wabash left the conference in 1976 and DePauw in 1977, both for non-scholarship Division III in all sports, the ICC was reduced once again to a five-team league for 1977–78. Just four teams competed for the 1977–78 basketball title, after Evansville lost its entire active roster in the crash of Air Indiana Flight 216 on December 13, 1977, while en route to a non-conference road game.

In June 1978, the ICC was reconstituted as the Heartland Collegiate Conference to acknowledge the addition of Ashland University (then Ashland College) of Ohio and Georgetown College of Kentucky, along with Franklin College of Indiana. It was more than just a name change, as the members agreed to operate their new conference entirely on the Division II level, and without basketball as a conference sport. This move allowed Butler, Evansville, and Valparaiso to pursue membership in Division I basketball conferences while competing on the Division II level in all other sports, at a time when the NCAA still allowed this practice.

In 1997 the official records of the conference were moved from Terre Haute, Indiana onto the campus of DePauw University, becoming part of the Indiana Collegiate Conference/Special Collections Library. The archive also contains an extensive assortment of images and memorabilia from each member university.

== Members ==
- Ball State (1950–1968)
- Butler (1950–1978)
- Evansville (1950–1978)
- Indiana State (1950–1968)
- Saint Joseph's (Ind.) (1950–1978)
- Valparaiso (1950–1978)
- DePauw (1953–1977)
- Indiana Central (1970–1978)
- Wabash (1970–1976)

=== Subsequent conference affiliations ===
Team	Conference after ICC and/or HCC	Current conference	Current affiliation
Ball State	Midwestern Conference	Mid-American Conference	NCAA Div I
Butler	Midwestern Collegiate Conference	Big East Conference	NCAA Div I
DePauw	Indiana Collegiate Athletic Conference	North Coast Athletic Conference	NCAA Div III
Evansville	Midwestern Collegiate Conference	Missouri Valley Conference	NCAA Div I
Indiana Central+	Great Lakes Valley Conference		NCAA Div II
Indiana State	Midwestern Conference	Missouri Valley Conference	NCAA Div I
Saint Joseph's (IN)	Great Lakes Valley Conference	—N/a	Closed
Valparaiso	Mid-Continent Conference	Missouri Valley Conference	NCAA Div I
Wabash	Indiana Collegiate Athletic Conference	North Coast Athletic Conference	NCAA Div III

+ Indiana Central was renamed University of Indianapolis in 1986

== Conference champions ==
=== Men's basketball ===
==== Conference champions by school ====
School	Winners	Years
Evansville	16	1954, 1955, 1956, 1958, 1960, 1963, 1964, 1965, 1966-co, 1969, 1971, 1972, 1973-co, 1974, 1976, 1977-co
Butler	9	1952, 1953, 1959, 1961, 1962, 1970-co, 1973-co, 1977-co, 1978
Indiana State	4	1951, 1966-co, 1967, 1968-co
DePauw	2	1957, 1968-co
St Joseph's	2	1970-co, 1975
Valparaiso	1	1973-co

==== Award winners ====
Season	Most Valuable Player	School	Coach of the Year	School
1951	Jim Ove	Valparaiso		
1952	Roger Adkins	Indiana State	Richard Scharf	St. Joseph's
1953	Don Bielke	Valparaiso		
1954			Arad McCutchan	Evansville
1955	Jerry Clayton	Evansville	Arad McCutchan	Evansville
1956	John Harrawood	Evansville	Tony Hinkle; Arad McCutchan	Butler; Evansville
1957	John Harrawood	Evansville	Jim Hinga	Ball State
1958	Ed Smallwood	Evansville	Arad McCutchan	Evansville
1959	Bob "Biscuit" Williams	St Joseph's	Duane Klueh	Indiana State
1960	Ed Smallwood	Evansville	Arad McCutchan	Evansville
1961	Dale Wise	Evansville	Tony Hinkle	Butler
1962	Tom Bowman	Butler	Tony Hinkle	Butler
1963	Jerry Sloan	Evansville	Duane Klueh	Indiana State
1964	Ed Butler	Ball State	Jim Hinga	Ball State
1965	Jerry Sloan	Evansville	Arad McCutchan	Evansville
1966	Larry Humes	Evansville	Duane Klueh; Arad McCutchan	Indiana State; Evansville
1967	Butch Wade	Indiana State	Duane Klueh	Indiana State
1968	Jerry Newsom	Indiana State	Elmer McCall	DePauw
1969	Tom McCormick	DePauw	Arad McCutchan	Evansville
1970	Bruce Linder	Valparaiso	Jim Holstein	St. Joseph's
1971	Don Buse	Evansville	Arad McCutchan	Evansville
1972	Don Buse	Evansville	Arad McCutchan	Evansville
1973	Jim Thordsen	St Joseph's	George Theofanis	Butler
1974	Jim Thordsen	St Joseph's	Arad McCutchan	Evansville
1975	Jim Thordsen	St Joseph's	John Weinert	St Joseph's
1976	Gerry Klamrowski	St Joseph's	Arad McCutchan	Evansville
1977	Wayne Burris	Butler	George Theofanis	Butler
1978	Tom Orner	Butler	Joe Sexson	Butler

=== Football ===
==== Conference champions by school ====
School	Winners	Years
Butler	14	1952-co, 1953, 1958, 1959, 1960, 1961, 1962, 1963, 1964-co, 1972-co, 1973, 1974, 1975, 1977-co
Evansville	6	1955-co, 1964-co, 1969-co, 1970, 1972-co, 1976-co
Saint Joseph's	6	1955-co, 1956, 1957, 1971, 1976-co, 1977-co
Valparaiso	6	1951, 1952-co, 1954, 1964-co, 1968, 1969
Ball State	4	1964-co, 1965, 1966, 1967
Indiana State	1	1964-co

==== ICC Back (offense) of the Year winners by school ====
Season	Winners	School
1951		
1952		
1953		
1954	Leroy Thompson	Butler
1955	Ken Lutterbach	Evansville
1956	Robert "Bud" George	Evansville
1957		
1958	Timmy Brown	Ball State
1959		

=== Baseball ===
==== Conference champions by school ====
School	Winners	Years
Valparaiso	17	1952, 1953, 1955, 1956, 1959, 1960, 1963, 1964-co, 1966-co, 1967, 1968, 1969-co, 1970, 1971-co, 1972, 1974-co, 1977
Indiana State	4	1957, 1958, 1964-co, 1966-co
Ball State	3	1961, 1962, 1965
Indiana Central	2	1971-co, 1973
Butler	2	1969-co, 1974-co

=== Swimming and diving ===
==== Conference champions by school ====
School	Winners	Years
Evansville	8	1965, 1966, 1967, 1969, 1971, 1972, 1973, 1974
Ball State	4	1959, 1961, 1962, 1963
Indiana State	2	1964, 1968
Wabash	2	1975, 1976
Valparaiso	2	1970, 1977
DePauw	1	1960

== Football standings ==
1951 Indiana Collegiate Conference football standings
	Conf.					Overall
Team	W		L		T	W		L		T
Valparaiso $	4	–	0	–	0	9	–	0	–	0
Saint Joseph's (IN)	3	–	1	–	0	4	–	4	–	0
Butler	3	–	2	–	0	4	–	4	–	1
Evansville	1	–	1	–	0	5	–	5	–	0
Indiana State	0	–	3	–	1	0	–	6	–	1
Ball State	0	–	4	–	1	0	–	6	–	1
$ – Conference champion

1952 Indiana Collegiate Conference football standings
	Conf.					Overall
Team	W		L		T	W		L		T
Butler +	3	–	1	–	1	5	–	3	–	1
Valparaiso +	3	–	1	–	1	5	–	3	–	1
Indiana State	2	–	1	–	2	4	–	1	–	3
Ball State	3	–	2	–	0	3	–	5	–	1
Evansville	2	–	3	–	0	2	–	7	–	0
Saint Joseph's (IN)	0	–	5	–	0	0	–	8	–	0
+ – Conference co-champions

1953 Indiana Collegiate Conference football standings
	Conf.					Overall
Team	W		L		T	W		L		T
Butler $	5	–	0	–	0	6	–	2	–	0
Valparaiso	3	–	2	–	0	5	–	2	–	1
Ball State	3	–	2	–	0	5	–	2	–	1
Indiana State	2	–	3	–	0	5	–	3	–	0
Evansville	2	–	3	–	0	3	–	7	–	0
Saint Joseph's (IN)	0	–	5	–	0	2	–	6	–	0
DePauw	0	–	0	–	0	0	–	7	–	1
$ – Conference champion

1954 Indiana Collegiate Conference football standings
	Conf.					Overall
Team	W		L		T	W		L		T
Valparaiso $	5	–	1	–	0	6	–	2	–	1
Ball State	4	–	2	–	0	6	–	2	–	0
Evansville	4	–	2	–	0	5	–	4	–	0
Butler	3	–	2	–	0	4	–	4	–	0
Saint Joseph's (IN)	2	–	4	–	0	5	–	4	–	0
Indiana State	2	–	4	–	0	4	–	4	–	0
DePauw	0	–	5	–	0	0	–	7	–	1
$ – Conference champion

1955 Indiana Collegiate Conference football standings
	Conf.					Overall
Team	W		L		T	W		L		T
Evansville +	5	–	1	–	0	6	–	3	–	0
Saint Joseph's (IN) +	5	–	1	–	0	6	–	3	–	0
Valparaiso	4	–	2	–	0	5	–	4	–	0
Butler	3	–	3	–	0	3	–	5	–	0
DePauw	2	–	4	–	0	5	–	4	–	0
Ball State	1	–	5	–	0	3	–	5	–	0
Indiana State	1	–	5	–	0	2	–	6	–	0
+ – Conference co-champions

1956 Indiana Collegiate Conference football standings
	Conf.					Overall
Team	W		L		T	W		L		T
Saint Joseph's (IN) $^	6	–	0	–	0	8	–	1	–	1
Butler	5	–	1	–	0	6	–	2	–	0
Valparaiso	4	–	2	–	0	6	–	4	–	0
Evansville	3	–	3	–	0	4	–	5	–	0
Ball State	2	–	4	–	0	4	–	4	–	0
DePauw	1	–	5	–	0	1	–	6	–	1
Indiana State	0	–	6	–	0	2	–	6	–	0
$ – Conference champion; ^ – NAIA playoff (Aluminum Bowl) participant

1957 Indiana Collegiate Conference football standings
	Conf.					Overall
Team	W		L		T	W		L		T
Saint Joseph's (IN) $	5	–	0	–	0	8	–	1	–	0
Butler	5	–	1	–	0	7	–	2	–	0
DePauw	3	–	2	–	0	6	–	2	–	0
Ball State	2	–	3	–	1	2	–	5	–	1
Valparaiso	1	–	2	–	1	4	–	2	–	2
Evansville	1	–	4	–	0	1	–	6	–	0
Indiana State	0	–	5	–	0	1	–	6	–	0
$ – Conference champion

1958 Indiana Collegiate Conference football standings
	Conf.					Overall
Team	W		L		T	W		L		T
Butler $	5	–	1	–	0	8	–	1	–	0
Ball State	4	–	2	–	0	6	–	2	–	0
Saint Joseph's (IN)	4	–	2	–	0	5	–	4	–	0
Valparaiso	3	–	3	–	0	6	–	3	–	0
Evansville	3	–	3	–	0	4	–	5	–	0
DePauw	1	–	5	–	0	2	–	7	–	0
Indiana State	1	–	5	–	0	2	–	6	–	0
$ – Conference champion

1959 Indiana Collegiate Conference football standings
	Conf.					Overall
Team	W		L		T	W		L		T
Butler $	6	–	0	–	0	9	–	0	–	0
Evansville	4	–	2	–	0	6	–	3	–	0
Indiana State	3	–	3	–	0	5	–	3	–	0
Saint Joseph's (IN)	3	–	3	–	0	4	–	4	–	0
Valparaiso	3	–	3	–	0	5	–	4	–	0
DePauw	1	–	5	–	0	1	–	7	–	1
Ball State	1	–	5	–	0	1	–	7	–	0
$ – Conference champion

1960 Indiana Collegiate Conference football standings
	Conf.					Overall
Team	W		L		T	W		L		T
Butler $	5	–	1	–	0	7	–	1	–	0
Evansville	4	–	2	–	0	5	–	3	–	0
Saint Joseph's (IN)	3	–	2	–	1	3	–	4	–	1
Indiana State	3	–	3	–	0	3	–	4	–	0
Ball State	2	–	4	–	0	3	–	5	–	0
Valparaiso	2	–	4	–	0	3	–	6	–	0
DePauw	1	–	4	–	1	2	–	5	–	1
$ – Conference champion

1961 Indiana Collegiate Conference football standings
	Conf.					Overall
Team	W		L		T	W		L		T
Butler $	6	–	0	–	0	9	–	0	–	0
Valparaiso	5	–	1	–	0	7	–	2	–	0
Evansville	3	–	3	–	0	4	–	5	–	0
DePauw	2	–	4	–	0	5	–	4	–	0
Ball State	2	–	4	–	0	2	–	5	–	1
Indiana State	2	–	4	–	0	2	–	6	–	0
Saint Joseph's (IN)	1	–	5	–	0	1	–	7	–	0
$ – Conference champion

1962 Indiana Collegiate Conference football standings
	Conf.					Overall
Team	W		L		T	W		L		T
Butler $	4	–	1	–	1	5	–	2	–	2
Valparaiso	4	–	2	–	0	6	–	3	–	0
Indiana State	4	–	2	–	0	5	–	3	–	0
DePauw	3	–	3	–	0	5	–	4	–	0
Saint Joseph's (IN)	3	–	3	–	0	4	–	4	–	1
Ball State	2	–	3	–	1	4	–	3	–	1
Evansville	0	–	6	–	0	0	–	9	–	0
$ – Conference champion

1963 Indiana Collegiate Conference football standings
	Conf.					Overall
Team	W		L		T	W		L		T
Butler $	6	–	0	–	0	8	–	1	–	0
Ball State	4	–	2	–	0	5	–	3	–	0
DePauw	3	–	3	–	0	4	–	4	–	0
Valparaiso	3	–	3	–	0	3	–	5	–	0
Indiana State	2	–	4	–	0	4	–	4	–	0
Evansville	2	–	4	–	0	2	–	6	–	0
Saint Joseph's (IN)	1	–	5	–	0	2	–	7	–	0
$ – Conference champion

1964 Indiana Collegiate Conference football standings
	Conf.					Overall
Team	W		L		T	W		L		T
Indiana State +	4	–	2	–	0	6	–	2	–	0
Valparaiso +	4	–	2	–	0	6	–	3	–	0
Ball State +	4	–	2	–	0	5	–	3	–	0
Butler +	4	–	2	–	0	4	–	4	–	0
Evansville +	4	–	2	–	0	4	–	4	–	0
DePauw	1	–	5	–	0	2	–	7	–	0
Saint Joseph's (IN)	0	–	6	–	0	0	–	8	–	0
+ – Conference co-champions

1965 Indiana Collegiate Conference football standings
	Conf.					Overall
Team	W		L		T	W		L		T
Ball State $^	6	–	0	–	0	9	–	0	–	1
Butler	4	–	2	–	0	6	–	3	–	0
Evansville	3	–	3	–	0	5	–	4	–	0
Indiana State	2	–	3	–	1	4	–	3	–	1
Saint Joseph's (IN)	2	–	4	–	0	3	–	5	–	0
Valparaiso	2	–	4	–	0	3	–	6	–	0
DePauw	1	–	4	–	1	2	–	6	–	1
$ – Conference champion; ^ – Grantland Rice Bowl participant

1966 Indiana Collegiate Conference football standings
	Conf.					Overall
Team	W		L		T	W		L		T
Ball State $	5	–	0	–	1	7	–	0	–	1
Indiana State	4	–	2	–	0	6	–	2	–	0
Butler	4	–	2	–	0	4	–	5	–	0
Saint Joseph's (IN)	3	–	3	–	0	4	–	4	–	0
Evansville	2	–	3	–	1	4	–	4	–	1
DePauw	1	–	5	–	0	3	–	6	–	0
Valparaiso	1	–	5	–	0	3	–	6	–	0
$ – Conference champion

1967 Indiana Collegiate Conference football standings
	Conf.					Overall
Team	W		L		T	W		L		T
Ball State $^	5	–	1	–	0	7	–	3	–	0
DePauw	4	–	1	–	1	6	–	2	–	1
Indiana State	4	–	2	–	0	5	–	4	–	0
Saint Joseph's (IN)	3	–	3	–	0	3	–	6	–	0
Evansville	2	–	3	–	1	2	–	5	–	2
Valparaiso	1	–	5	–	0	3	–	6	–	0
Butler	1	–	5	–	0	2	–	7	–	0
$ – Conference champion; ^ – Grantland Rice Bowl participant

1968 Indiana Collegiate Conference football standings
	Conf.					Overall
Team	W		L		T	W		L		T
Valparaiso $	4	–	0	–	0	4	–	5	–	0
DePauw	3	–	1	–	0	6	–	3	–	0
Evansville	2	–	2	–	0	3	–	6	–	0
Butler	1	–	3	–	0	2	–	7	–	0
Saint Joseph's (IN)	0	–	4	–	0	1	–	8	–	0
$ – Conference champion

1969 Indiana Collegiate Conference football standings
	Conf.					Overall
Team	W		L		T	W		L		T
Valparaiso +	3	–	1	–	0	7	–	2	–	0
Evansville +	3	–	1	–	0	4	–	5	–	0
Butler	2	–	2	–	0	3	–	6	–	0
Saint Joseph's (IN)	1	–	3	–	0	5	–	4	–	0
DePauw	1	–	3	–	0	2	–	7	–	0
+ – Conference co-champions

1970 Indiana Collegiate Conference football standings
	Conf.					Overall
Team	W		L		T	W		L		T
Evansville $	4	–	0	–	0	6	–	3	–	0
Saint Joseph's (IN)	3	–	1	–	0	7	–	2	–	0
Butler	2	–	2	–	0	3	–	6	–	1
Valparaiso	1	–	3	–	0	5	–	3	–	1
DePauw	0	–	4	–	0	4	–	5	–	0
$ – Conference champion

1971 Indiana Collegiate Conference football standings
	Conf.					Overall
Team	W		L		T	W		L		T
Saint Joseph's (IN) $	4	–	0	–	0	8	–	2	–	0
Valparaiso	3	–	1	–	0	8	–	2	–	0
Evansville	2	–	2	–	0	3	–	6	–	0
Butler	1	–	3	–	0	3	–	7	–	0
DePauw	0	–	4	–	0	1	–	8	–	0
Indiana Central *	0	–	0	–	0	6	–	5	–	0
Wabash *	0	–	0	–	0	5	–	5	–	0
$ – Conference champion; * – ineligible for conference title

1972 Indiana Collegiate Conference football standings
	Conf.					Overall
Team	W		L		T	W		L		T
Butler +	4	–	1	–	0	5	–	5	–	0
Evansville +	4	–	1	–	0	5	–	5	–	0
Wabash	2	–	2	–	0	4	–	6	–	0
Indiana Central	2	–	3	–	0	4	–	6	–	0
Valparaiso	2	–	3	–	0	6	–	4	–	0
Saint Joseph's (IN)	2	–	3	–	0	4	–	4	–	1
DePauw	1	–	4	–	0	2	–	7	–	0
+ – Conference co-champions

1973 Indiana Collegiate Conference football standings
	Conf.					Overall
Team	W		L		T	W		L		T
Butler $	5	–	1	–	0	5	–	5	–	0
DePauw	4	–	2	–	0	6	–	3	–	0
Evansville	3	–	2	–	0	5	–	5	–	0
Indiana Central	3	–	3	–	0	7	–	3	–	0
Valparaiso	3	–	3	–	0	6	–	5	–	0
Saint Joseph's (IN)	1	–	4	–	0	3	–	7	–	0
Wabash	0	–	4	–	0	5	–	5	–	0
$ – Conference champion

1974 Indiana Collegiate Conference football standings
	Conf.					Overall
Team	W		L		T	W		L		T
Butler $	6	–	0	–	0	8	–	2	–	0
Evansville ^	5	–	1	–	0	8	–	2	–	0
DePauw	4	–	2	–	0	7	–	3	–	0
Indiana Central	2	–	4	–	0	5	–	5	–	0
Wabash	2	–	4	–	0	5	–	5	–	0
Valparaiso	2	–	4	–	0	3	–	6	–	0
Saint Joseph's (IN)	0	–	6	–	0	0	–	9	–	0
$ – Conference champion; ^ – NCAA Division III playoff participant

1975 Indiana Collegiate Conference football standings
	Conf.					Overall
Team	W		L		T	W		L		T
Butler $	6	–	0	–	0	9	–	1	–	0
Indiana Central ^	5	–	1	–	0	8	–	3	–	0
Evansville	4	–	2	–	0	7	–	3	–	0
DePauw	2	–	4	–	0	5	–	5	–	0
Valparaiso	2	–	4	–	0	3	–	6	–	0
Saint Joseph's (IN)	2	–	4	–	0	2	–	8	–	0
Wabash	0	–	6	–	0	3	–	7	–	0
$ – Conference champion; ^ – NCAA Division III playoff participant

1976 Indiana Collegiate Conference football standings
	Conf.					Overall
Team	W		L		T	W		L		T
Saint Joseph's (IN) +	4	–	1	–	0	6	–	3	–	0
Evansville +	4	–	1	–	0	4	–	6	–	0
Indiana Central	3	–	2	–	0	6	–	4	–	0
Butler	2	–	3	–	0	6	–	4	–	0
Valparaiso	2	–	3	–	0	2	–	7	–	1
DePauw	0	–	5	–	0	2	–	8	–	0
+ – Conference co-champions

1977 Indiana Collegiate Conference football standings
	Conf.					Overall
Team	W		L		T	W		L		T
Saint Joseph's (IN) +	3	–	1	–	0	5	–	4	–	0
Butler +	3	–	1	–	0	5	–	5	–	0
Indiana Central	2	–	1	–	1	6	–	2	–	1
Valparaiso	1	–	2	–	1	3	–	6	–	1
Evansville	0	–	4	–	0	1	–	8	–	0
+ – Conference co-champions

== See also ==
- List of defunct college football conferences
