= 1976 NCAA Division III football season =

American college football season

- Regular season: August – November 1976
- Playoffs: November – December 1976
- National championship: Garrett-Harrison Stadium; Phenix City, AL
- Champion: Saint John's (MN)

The 1976 NCAA Division III football season, part of college football in the United States organized by the National Collegiate Athletic Association at the Division III level, began in August 1976, and concluded with the NCAA Division III Football Championship in December 1976 at Garrett-Harrison Stadium in Phenix City, Alabama. The Saint John's Johnnies won their first Division III championship, defeating the Towson State Tigers by a final score of 31−28.

== Conference and program changes ==
- The Virginia College Conference (now the Old Dominion Athletic Conference) began football play in 1976.

== Conference standings ==
1976 College Athletic Conference football standings
	Conf.					Overall
Team	W		L		T	W		L		T
Sewanee $	4	–	0	–	0	5	–	4	–	0
Centre	3	–	1	–	0	5	–	4	–	0
Rose–Hulman	1	–	3	–	0	5	–	5	–	0
Southwestern (TN)	1	–	3	–	0	4	–	5	–	0
Principia	1	–	3	–	0	2	–	6	–	0
$ – Conference champion

1976 College Conference of Illinois and Wisconsin football standings
	Conf.					Overall
Team	W		L		T	W		L		T
Carroll (WI) $^	7	–	0	–	1	8	–	1	–	1
Augustana (IL) ^	6	–	2	–	0	7	–	3	–	0
No. 13 Illinois Wesleyan	5	–	3	–	0	6	–	3	–	0
Wheaton (IL)	5	–	3	–	0	6	–	3	–	0
North Central (IL)	4	–	3	–	1	5	–	3	–	1
Millikin	4	–	4	–	0	4	–	5	–	0
Carthage	3	–	5	–	0	3	–	6	–	0
Elmhurst	1	–	7	–	0	2	–	7	–	0
North Park	0	–	8	–	0	1	–	8	–	0
$ – Conference champion; ^ – NCAA Division III playoff participant

1976 Independent College Athletic Conference football standings
	Conf.					Overall
Team	W		L		T	W		L		T
Alfred $	3	–	0	–	1	4	–	2	–	2
St. Lawrence ^	4	–	1	–	0	9	–	2	–	0
Ithaca	2	–	1	–	1	6	–	2	–	1
Hobart	2	–	3	–	0	5	–	4	–	0
RPI	1	–	2	–	0	4	–	5	–	0
RIT	0	–	5	–	0	3	–	6	–	0
$ – Conference champion; ^ – NCAA Division III playoff participant

1976 Indiana Collegiate Conference football standings
	Conf.					Overall
Team	W		L		T	W		L		T
Saint Joseph's (IN) +	4	–	1	–	0	6	–	3	–	0
Evansville +	4	–	1	–	0	4	–	6	–	0
Indiana Central	3	–	2	–	0	6	–	4	–	0
Butler	2	–	3	–	0	6	–	4	–	0
Valparaiso	2	–	3	–	0	2	–	7	–	1
DePauw	0	–	5	–	0	2	–	8	–	0
+ – Conference co-champions

1976 Iowa Conference football standings
	Conf.					Overall
Team	W		L		T	W		L		T
William Penn $	6	–	1	–	0	8	–	2	–	0
Buena Vista ^	5	–	1	–	1	8	–	2	–	1
Central (IA)	5	–	2	–	0	7	–	2	–	0
Luther	4	–	3	–	0	4	–	5	–	0
Wartburg	3	–	3	–	1	4	–	4	–	1
Simpson (IA)	3	–	4	–	0	4	–	5	–	0
Dubuque	1	–	6	–	0	1	–	9	–	0
Upper Iowa	0	–	7	–	0	2	–	8	–	0
$ – Conference champion; ^ – NCAA Division III playoff participant

1976 Metropolitan Intercollegiate Conference football standings
	Conf.					Overall
Team	W		L		T	W		L		T
C. W. Post $	3	–	0	–	0	8	–	2	–	0
Merchant Marine	4	–	1	–	0	8	–	1	–	0
Hofstra	2	–	3	–	0	4	–	4	–	0
Seton Hall	1	–	2	–	1	3	–	5	–	2
Fordham	1	–	2	–	1	5	–	3	–	1
Wagner	1	–	4	–	0	2	–	7	–	1
$ – Conference champion

1976 Michigan Intercollegiate Athletic Association football standings
	Conf.					Overall
Team	W		L		T	W		L		T
Albion $	5	–	0	–	0	9	–	0	–	0
Hope	4	–	1	–	0	6	–	3	–	0
Alma	3	–	2	–	0	5	–	4	–	0
Kalamazoo	2	–	3	–	0	3	–	4	–	1
Adrian	1	–	4	–	0	3	–	6	–	0
Olivet	0	–	5	–	0	0	–	9	–	0
$ – Conference champion

1976 Middle Atlantic Conference football standings
	Conf.					Overall
Team	W		L		T	W		L		T
Northern Division
Albright x^	6	–	0	–	0	8	–	2	–	0
Lycoming	5	–	1	–	0	8	–	1	–	0
Juniata	3	–	3	–	0	6	–	3	–	0
Upsala	3	–	3	–	0	6	–	3	–	0
Wilkes	2	–	4	–	0	3	–	5	–	0
Susquehanna	2	–	4	–	0	3	–	6	–	0
Delaware Valley	0	–	6	–	0	0	–	8	–	0
Southern Division
Franklin & Marshall x	8	–	1	–	0	8	–	1	–	0
Widener	6	–	1	–	0	8	–	1	–	0
Moravian	6	–	2	–	0	7	–	2	–	0
Muhlenberg	5	–	3	–	1	5	–	3	–	1
Western Maryland	3	–	3	–	1	4	–	4	–	1
Dickinson	4	–	5	–	0	4	–	5	–	0
Lebanon Valley	3	–	5	–	0	3	–	6	–	0
Johns Hopkins	2	–	4	–	1	3	–	5	–	1
Swarthmore	1	–	5	–	1	1	–	7	–	1
Ursinus	0	–	9	–	0	0	–	9	–	0
Gettysburg *	1	–	1	–	0	3	–	7	–	0
x – Division champion/co-champions; ^ – NCAA Division III playoff participant; * – Ineligible due to insufficient conference games

1976 Midwest Conference football standings
	Conf.					Overall
Team	W		L		T	W		L		T
East Division
Ripon xy	4	–	0	–	0	6	–	3	–	0
Lawrence	3	–	1	–	0	7	–	2	–	0
Chicago	1	–	3	–	0	4	–	4	–	0
Lake Forest	1	–	3	–	0	2	–	6	–	0
Beloit	1	–	3	–	0	2	–	7	–	0
West Division
Cornell (IA) xy$	4	–	1	–	0	8	–	1	–	0
Knox x	4	–	1	–	0	7	–	1	–	1
Monmouth (IL) x	4	–	1	–	0	6	–	3	–	0
Coe	2	–	3	–	0	5	–	4	–	0
Carleton	1	–	4	–	0	2	–	6	–	0
Grinnell	0	–	5	–	0	3	–	5	–	0
Championship: Cornell (IA) 24, Ripon 22
$ – Conference champion; x – Division champion/co-champions; y – Championship game participant

1976 Minnesota Intercollegiate Athletic Conference football standings
	Conf.					Overall
Team	W		L		T	W		L		T
Saint John's (MN) $^	7	–	0	–	0	10	–	0	–	1
St. Olaf	5	–	2	–	0	7	–	3	–	0
St. Thomas (MN)	5	–	2	–	0	7	–	3	–	0
Concordia–Moorhead	5	–	2	–	0	6	–	3	–	0
Gustavus Adolphus	3	–	4	–	0	5	–	5	–	0
Hamline	2	–	5	–	0	4	–	5	–	0
Augsburg	1	–	6	–	0	1	–	8	–	0
Macalester	0	–	7	–	0	0	–	8	–	0
$ – Conference champion; ^ – NCAA Division III playoff participant; St. Thomas (MN) received a non-conference forfeit win from St. Cloud State.

1976 New England Football Conference standings
	Conf.					Overall
Team	W		L		T	W		L		T
Nichols $	7	–	1	–	0	8	–	1	–	0
Bridgewater State	5	–	3	–	0	6	–	3	–	0
Massachusetts Maritime	5	–	3	–	0	5	–	3	–	0
Plymouth State	5	–	3	–	0	5	–	4	–	0
Curry	4	–	4	–	0	5	–	4	–	0
Framingham State	4	–	4	–	0	5	–	4	–	0
Maine Maritime	4	–	4	–	0	4	–	4	–	0
New Haven	1	–	7	–	0	1	–	7	–	0
Boston State	1	–	7	–	0	1	–	7	–	0
$ – Conference champion

1976 New Jersey State Athletic Conference football standings
	Conf.					Overall
Team	W		L		T	W		L		T
Glassboro State $	4	–	1	–	0	5	–	5	–	0
Montclair State	4	–	1	–	0	4	–	5	–	1
Kean	2	–	2	–	1	5	–	4	–	1
Trenton State	2	–	2	–	1	3	–	4	–	1
William Paterson	2	–	3	–	0	4	–	4	–	0
Jersey City State	0	–	5	–	0	1	–	8	–	0
$ – Conference champion

1976 Ohio Athletic Conference football standings
	Conf.					Overall
Team	W		L		T	W		L		T
Blue Division
Baldwin–Wallace xy	5	–	0	–	0	7	–	2	–	0
Otterbein	4	–	1	–	0	6	–	2	–	1
Marietta	3	–	2	–	0	5	–	4	–	0
Ohio Wesleyan	2	–	3	–	0	3	–	5	–	0
Mount Union	1	–	4	–	0	3	–	6	–	0
Denison	0	–	5	–	0	1	–	7	–	1
Red Division
Wittenberg xy$	5	–	0	–	0	8	–	2	–	0
Ohio Northern	4	–	1	–	0	7	–	2	–	0
Muskingum	3	–	2	–	0	6	–	3	–	0
Capital	2	–	3	–	0	5	–	3	–	1
Wooster	1	–	4	–	0	4	–	5	–	0
Heidelberg	0	–	5	–	0	0	–	8	–	0
Not competing for championship
Kenyon			–			6	–	3	–	0
Oberlin			–			2	–	6	–	0
Championship: Wittenberg 16, Baldwin–Wallace 14
$ – Conference champion; x – Division champion/co-champions; y – Championship game participant

1976 Old Dominion Athletic Conference football standings
	Conf.					Overall
Team	W		L		T	W		L		T
Randolph–Macon $	3	–	1	–	0	5	–	3	–	1
Hampden–Sydney	3	–	1	–	0	7	–	4	–	0
Washington and Lee	2	–	2	–	0	5	–	5	–	0
Emory & Henry	2	–	2	–	0	4	–	6	–	0
Bridgewater	0	–	4	–	0	1	–	8	–	0
$ – Conference champion; Randolph–Macon was voted champion by conference coaches on November 23.

1976 Pennsylvania State Athletic Conference football standings
	Conf.					Overall
Team	W		L		T	W		L		T
East Division
East Stroudsburg xy+	6	–	0	–	0	9	–	0	–	1
West Chester	4	–	1	–	0	5	–	4	–	0
Millersville	4	–	2	–	0	6	–	3	–	0
Kutztown	3	–	3	–	0	5	–	5	–	0
Bloomsburg	2	–	4	–	0	2	–	7	–	0
Cheyney	1	–	5	–	0	1	–	7	–	0
Mansfield	0	–	5	–	0	2	–	7	–	1
West Division
Shippensburg xy+	5	–	1	–	0	8	–	2	–	1
Slippery Rock x	5	–	1	–	0	7	–	3	–	0
Edinboro	4	–	2	–	0	6	–	4	–	0
Clarion	3	–	3	–	0	7	–	3	–	0
Indiana (PA)	3	–	3	–	0	4	–	5	–	0
California (PA)	1	–	5	–	0	2	–	7	–	0
Lock Haven	0	–	6	–	0	2	–	8	–	0
Championship: East Stroudsburg 14, Shippensburg 14
+ – Conference co-champions; x – Division champion/co-champions; y – Championship game participant

1976 Presidents' Athletic Conference football standings
	Conf.					Overall
Team	W		L		T	W		L		T
Allegheny $	6	–	1	–	0	6	–	2	–	0
Carnegie Mellon	5	–	1	–	1	6	–	1	–	1
Washington & Jefferson	5	–	2	–	0	6	–	3	–	0
Bethany (WV)	4	–	3	–	0	4	–	5	–	0
Case Western Reserve	2	–	5	–	0	3	–	6	–	0
Hiram	2	–	5	–	0	3	–	6	–	0
John Carroll	2	–	5	–	0	3	–	6	–	0
Thiel	1	–	5	–	1	1	–	6	–	1
$ – Conference champion

1976 Southern California Intercollegiate Athletic Conference football standings
	Conf.					Overall
Team	W		L		T	W		L		T
No. 2 Redlands $^	5	–	0	–	0	10	–	2	–	0
Occidental	3	–	2	–	0	5	–	3	–	0
La Verne	3	–	2	–	0	5	–	4	–	0
Whittier	2	–	3	–	0	6	–	4	–	0
Claremont-Mudd	2	–	3	–	0	2	–	6	–	0
Pomona-Pitzer	0	–	5	–	0	2	–	7	–	0
$ – Conference champion; ^ – NAIA Division II playoff participant; Rankings from NAIA Division II poll

1976 Wisconsin State University Conference football standings
	Conf.					Overall
Team	W		L		T	W		L		T
No. 15 Wisconsin–Oshkosh +	6	–	2	–	0	8	–	2	–	0
No. 13 Wisconsin–Platteville +	6	–	2	–	0	8	–	2	–	0
Wisconsin–River Falls +	6	–	2	–	0	7	–	3	–	0
Wisconsin–La Crosse	5	–	3	–	0	7	–	3	–	0
Wisconsin–Stevens Point	5	–	3	–	0	7	–	3	–	0
Wisconsin–Eau Claire	4	–	4	–	0	5	–	5	–	0
Wisconsin–Stout	2	–	6	–	0	3	–	6	–	0
Wisconsin–Whitewater	2	–	6	–	0	2	–	9	–	0
Wisconsin–Superior	0	–	8	–	0	0	–	10	–	0
+ – Conference co-champions; Rankings from NAIA Division I poll

1976 NCAA Division III independents football records
	Conf.			Overall
Team	W	L	T	W		L		T
Colorado College		–		7	–	1	–	1
Maryville (TN)		–		7	–	2	–	0
Millsaps		–		7	–	2	–	0
Saint Peter's		–		5	–	2	–	0
Wabash		–		7	–	3	–	0
Canisius		–		6	–	3	–	0
Grove City		–		6	–	3	–	0
Norwich		–		6	–	3	–	0
Ashland		–		6	–	4	–	0
Rochester (NY)		–		4	–	4	–	1
Albany		–		4	–	5	–	0
Cortland		–		4	–	5	–	0
Brockport		–		3	–	5	–	1
Dayton		–		4	–	7	–	0
Saint Mary's		–		3	–	6	–	0
St. Norbert		–		2	–	8	–	0
San Diego		–		1	–	7	–	1
Fairleigh Dickinson–Florham		–		1	–	6	–	0
Bowie State		–		1	–	6	–	0
Georgetown		–		1	–	7	–	0
Plattsburgh		–		1	–	7	–	0

== Conference champions ==
Conference champions
- College Athletic Conference – Sewanee
- College Conference of Illinois and Wisconsin – Carroll (WI)
- Independent College Athletic Conference – Alfred
- Iowa Intercollegiate Athletic Conference – Wiliam Penn
- Michigan Intercollegiate Athletic Association – Albion
- Middle Atlantic Conference – Albright (North), Franklin & Marshall (South)
- Midwest Collegiate Athletic Conference – Cornell College, Knox, and Monmouth
- Minnesota Intercollegiate Athletic Conference – Saint John's (MN)
- New England Football Conference – Nichols
- New Jersey State Athletic Conference – Glassboro State
- Northwest Conference – Linfield
- Old Dominion Athletic Conference – Randolph-Macon
- Pennsylvania State Athletic Conference – East Stroudsburg
- Southern Intercollegiate Athletic Conference (Division III) – Fort Valley State
- Southern California Intercollegiate Athletic Conference – Redlands
- Texas Intercollegiate Athletic Association – Trinity (TX)
- Twin Rivers Conference – Concordia–St. Paul, Loras, Maranatha Baptist, Northwestern–St. Paul, and Northwestern (WI)
- Wisconsin Intercollegiate Athletic Conference – Wisconsin–Oshkosh, Wisconsin–Platteville, and Wisconsin–River Falls

== Postseason ==
The 1976 NCAA Division III Football Championship playoffs were the fourth annual single-elimination tournament to determine the national champion of men's NCAA Division III college football. The championship game was held at Garrett-Harrison Stadium in Phenix City, Alabama for the fourth consecutive year. Like the previous championship, eight teams competed in this edition.

=== Playoff bracket ===
Quarterfinals; Campus Sites
Saint John's (MN)	46
Augustana (IL)	7
Buena Vista (OT)	20
Carroll (WI)	14
St. Lawrence	26
Albright	7
Towson State	14
C.W. Post	10

Semifinals; Campus Sites
St. John's (MN)	61
Buena Vista	0
St. Lawrence	36
Towson State	38

National Championship Game; Garrett-Harrison Stadium; Phenix City, AL
St. John's (MN)	31
Towson State	28

== Coaching changes ==
This list includes all head coaching changes announced during or after the season.

School	Outgoing coach	Reason	Replacement	Previous position
Alfred	Alex Yunevich	Retired	Sam Sanders	Lehigh defensive coordinator and recruiting coordinator (1973–1976)
Beloit	Bob Nicholls	Resigned	Ed DeGeorge	Colorado College defensive coordinator (1967–1976)
Carroll (WI)	Steve Miller	Hired as head coach for Morningside	Robert Larsen	Hartford Union HS (WI) head coach (1963–1976)
DePauw	Tommy Mont	Resigned	Bob Bergman	Rose–Hulman head coach (1968–1976)
Dubuque	Larry Pohlman	Hired as head coach for Muncie Central HS (IN)	Don Birmingham	Iowa Lakes head coach (1974–1976)
Evansville	James A. Byers	Resigned	John Moses	Evansville defensive coordinator (1976)
Hamline	Jim Sessions	Resigned	Bob Sadek	Northern Michigan defensive backs coach (1974–1976)
Hobart	George W. Davis	Resigned	Dave Urick	Hobart defensive line coach (1971–1976)
Juniata	Walt Nadzak	Hired as head coach for Connecticut	Dean Rossi	Juniata offensive coordinator (1972–1976)
Knox	Albert Reilly	Resigned	Joe Campanelli	Cornell (IA) defensive backs coach (1975–1976)
Merchant Marine	Clive Rush	Fired	Pete Carmichael	Columbia defensive coordinator (1974–1976)
Millikin	Skip Mathieson	Hired as quarterbacks coach for Cincinnati	Merle Chapman	Millikin offensive coordinator (1973–1976)
Moravian	Rocco Calvo	Resigned	Ed Little	Moravian offensive line coach and recruiting coordinator (1968–1976)
Olivet	Bob Friedlund	Resigned	Chuck Cilibraise (Note: Originally, Chuck Dickerson, the head coach at Elwood HS (IN) from 1975 to 1976, was named head coach. He resigned after nine days to become an assistant coach for the Toronto Argonauts.)	Olivet High School head coach (1972–1976)
Rose–Hulman	Bob Bergman	Hired as head coach for DePauw	Joe Touchton	Rose–Hulman defensive coordinator (1971–1976)
Upper Iowa	Everett Eischeid (interim)	Permanent replacement hired/retired	Dennis Caryl	Northwestern (IA) offensive coordinator (1974–1976)
Valparaiso	Norm Amundsen	Resigned	Bill Koch	Valparaiso defensive coordinator (1975–1976)
Western Maryland	Ron Jones	Resigned	Jim Hindman	Western Maryland defensive assistant (1976)
William Penn	Craig Boller	Hired as defensive line coach for Tennessee	Jim Spry	Indian Hills head coach (1975–1976)

== See also ==
- 1976 NCAA Division I football season
- 1976 NCAA Division II football season
- 1976 NAIA Division I football season
- 1976 NAIA Division II football season
