= Robert Bergman =

Robert Bergman may refer to:

- Robert Bergman (museum director) (1945–1999), art museum director and professor
- Robert G. Bergman (born 1942), American chemist
- Robert L. Bergman (1948–2013), American politician and businessman
- Bob Bergman, American football and track and field coach
