= Katharine Lee Reid =

American museum curator and director (1941–2022)

- Born: Katharine Caecilia Lee Reid; December 12, 1941; Detroit, Michigan, U.S.
- Died: September 22, 2022 (aged 80); Chapel Hill, North Carolina, U.S.
- Education: Vassar College; Harvard University; Institut d'Art et d'Archéologie
- Occupations: Art historian, curator, and museum director
- Honors: Ordre des Arts et des Lettres

Katharine Lee Reid (December 12, 1941 – September 22, 2022) was an American art historian, curator, and museum director. She was a director of the Virginia Museum of Fine Arts and the Cleveland Museum of Art and deputy director of the Art Institute of Chicago.

In her early career, Reid held curatorial positions at the Ackland Art Museum, the Smart Museum of Art, and the Toledo Museum of Art. Her expertise as an art historian included European paintings and American and European decorative arts.

== Early life ==
Katharine Caecilia Lee Reid was born on December 12, 1941, in Detroit, Michigan. She was the first daughter of Ruth Alida Ward and Sherman Lee, an art historian and director of the Cleveland Museum of Art. Reid said she essentially "grew up" in the Cleveland Museum of Art. Her interest in art grew during her childhood when her father would bring home photographs of artwork from art dealers and ask her what she would buy if she were director. She studied at the Laurel School in Shaker Heights, Ohio, and then at Vassar College and Harvard University. After receiving a Fulbright Scholarship in 1963, she studied overseas at the Institut d'Art et d'Archéologie in the Sorbonne.

== Career ==
Reid took up museum curatorship at the Toledo Museum of Art in 1966. She was then curator of the Smart Museum of Art at the University of Chicago and then the Ackland Art Museum at the University of North Carolina.

From 1982 to 1991, Reid served as assistant director and later deputy director of the Art Institute of Chicago. As director of the Virginia Museum of Fine Arts (VMFA) from 1991 to 2000, Reid led the museum through the early 1990s recession, increasing attendance and expanding its outreach programs to the African-American community of Richmond despite severe budget cuts. She initiated a $110-million expansion and renovation of the museum and helped found Museums on the Boulevard (MOB), an organization whose purpose was to coordinate programs among cultural institutions of Richmond's Fan district.

On March 13, 2000, she succeeded Robert Bergman as the sixth director of the Cleveland Museum of Art. In her time as director, she began a renovation and expansion of the museum designed by Uruguayan architect Rafael Viñoly, created a separate department of African art in 2001, and established the first full-time curator of contemporary art position. She was also president of the Association of Art Museum Directors. She retired in 2005 in order to spend time with her family. Timothy Rub succeeded her as director in 2006.

== Later life ==
Reid received the Ordre des Arts et des Lettres from the Government of France and was awarded honorary degrees by Knox College and University of North Carolina at Chapel Hill. She served on the advisory boards of the Ackland Art Museum and the Nasher Museum of Art. She died on September 22, 2022, in Chapel Hill, North Carolina, from complications of heart surgery.
