= Blessed sword and hat =

Blessed sword
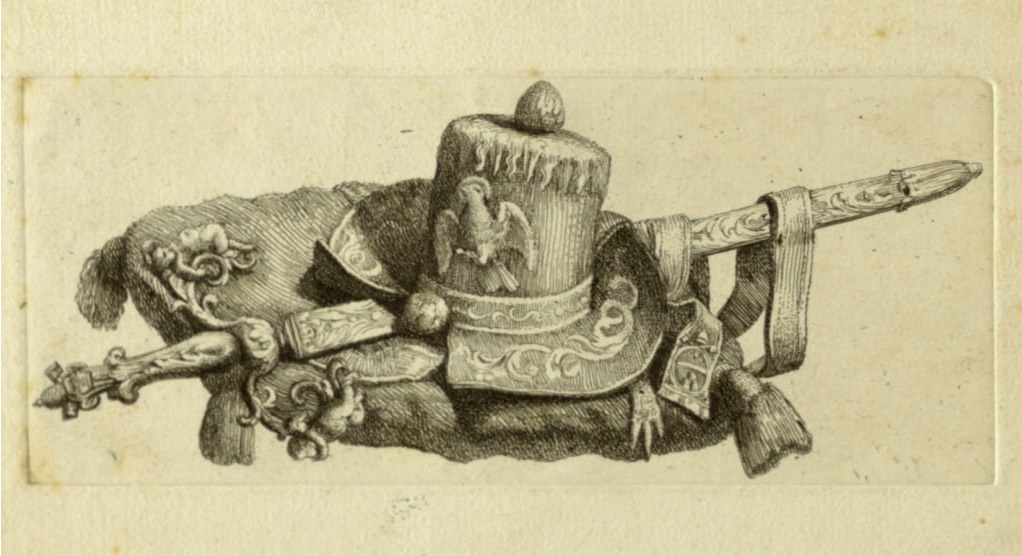
- A blessed sword and hat lying on a cushion, etching by Johann Jakob Frey the Elder
- Type: Ceremonial sword
- Place of origin: Papal States

Service history
- In service: 14th–19th century

The blessed sword (Latin: ensis benedictus, Italian: stocco benedetto or stocco pontificio) and the blessed hat (also: ducal hat, Latin: pileus or capellus, Italian: berrettone pontificio or berrettone ducale) were a gift offered by popes to Catholic monarchs or other secular recipients in recognition of their defence of Christendom. Each pair was blessed by a pope on Christmas Eve in St. Peter's Basilica in Rome. The sword was an ornate ceremonial weapon, usually large, up to 2 m (6 ft 7 in) long, with the hilt embellished with the pope's coat of arms, and the blade with the pope's name. A similarly ornate scabbard and belt were added to the sword. The hat was a cylinder made of red velvet with two lappets hanging down from its top. The right-hand side of the hat was decorated with a dove representing the Holy Spirit embroidered in pearls, while a shining sun symbolizing Christ was embroidered in goldwork on the top.

The earliest preserved blessed sword, now located at the Royal Armory in Madrid, was given by Pope Eugene IV to King John II of Castile in 1446. The latest preserved of the blessed swords, now at the National Museum of the Middle Ages in Paris, was blessed in 1772 by Pope Clement XIV and presented to Francisco Ximénez de Tejada, Grand Master of the Knights Hospitaller. Not all recipients are known; among those whose names have been preserved, there were at least twelve emperors of the Holy Roman Empire, ten kings of France, seven kings of Poland, and six kings of Spain. Additionally, three or four blessed swords and hats were given to kings of England, two or three to kings of Scots, and three each to the kings of Hungary and Portugal. Recipients also included various princes, including heirs-apparent, archdukes, dukes, noblemen, military commanders, as well as cities and states.

== History ==
Allegory of the secular power receiving a blessed sword and hat from putti, as painted by Gregorio Lazzarini, c. 1720

The tradition of distributing blessed swords and hats by the popes is not as old as that of another papal gift, the golden rose, but it does date back at least as far back as the 14th century. The earliest recipient of a pontifical sword and hat who is known for certain was Fortiguerra Fortiguerri, a gonfaloniere of the Republic of Lucca, who received it from Pope Urban VI in 1386. However, papal account books record payments for the manufacture of such gifts as early as 1357, and even then it seems to have been a long-established practice. Some historians push the origin of the tradition even further back. According to Gaetano Moroni, Pope Innocent III presented a sword and hat to King William the Lion of the Scots in 1202. Lord Twining dismissed this proposition as legendary, but accepted that the tradition originated with Pope Paul I's gift of a sword to King Pepin the Short of the Franks in 758.

Starting with the pontificate of Pope Martin V (reigned 1417–1431), detailed payment records exist for the manufacture of swords and hats for every year, although the recipients are not always known. During the 15th century, popes gradually moved from the practice of presenting the swords and hats to noblemen or princes visiting Rome at Christmas time towards sending them to distant monarchs as either reward or encouragement to defend Christendom and the interests of the Catholic Church. The practice accelerated under Pope Nicholas V (r. 1447–1455), who used the gifts to promote a military alliance against the Ottoman Empire.

== Description ==
Approximate cost of one pair of blessed sword and hat in the 15th century (in Italian gold florins)
Item	Cost
Blessed sword with scabbard and belt
Blade (ready-made)	3.00 ƒ
Wooden frame of the scabbard	0.50 ƒ
Silver for the grip, pommel and the filigree work on the scabbard	90.00 ƒ
Gilding of the sword and scabbard	20.00 ƒ
Crimson lining of the scabbard	2.00 ƒ
Cloth of gold for the belt	15.00 ƒ
Silver for the clasp and buckle of the belt	15.00 ƒ
Manufacture of the sword, scabbard and belt	30.00 ƒ
Blessed hat
Pearls	35.00 ƒ
Ermines	6.00 ƒ
Embroidery	5.00 ƒ
Gold band	5.00 ƒ
Manufacture of the hat	4.00 ƒ
Total	230.50 ƒ

=== Sword ===
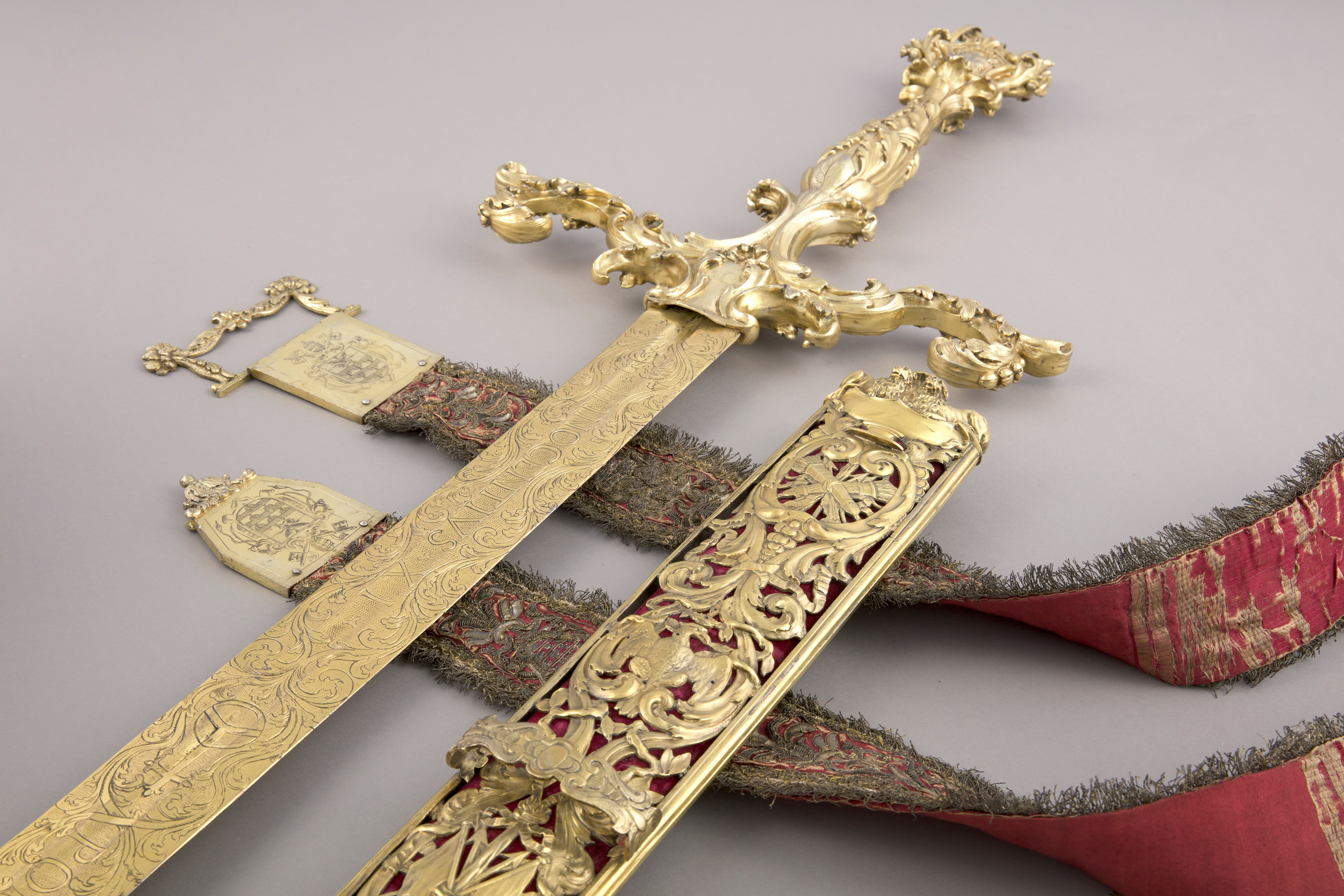
The blessed sword, with its scabbard and belt, of King John III Sobieski of Poland

The blessed sword was always a two-handed one, sometimes more than 2 metres (7 ft) long. The hilt was made of silver and covered with elaborate repoussage in gold. The pommel was decorated with the pope's coat of arms surrounded with images of the papal tiara and pallium. The blade was embellished with intricate engravings. They included an inscription running along the length of the blade, indicating the pope's name and the year of his pontificate in which he blessed the sword. The accompanying scabbard and belt were similarly sumptuous and ornate, covered in velvet and studded with precious stones, and also bore the papal coat of arms.

The identity of the recipient, on the other hand, was never indicated on the sword in any way. This practice stemmed from the Church's stance that the pope himself was the true defender of the faith, while the prince bestowed with the sword was merely the pontiff's armed arm. The symbolic significance of the sword was connected to the papal claim to both supreme spiritual and temporal power, derived from the Biblical story of Saint Peter using a sword to protect Jesus during his arrest in the Garden of Olives.

=== Hat ===
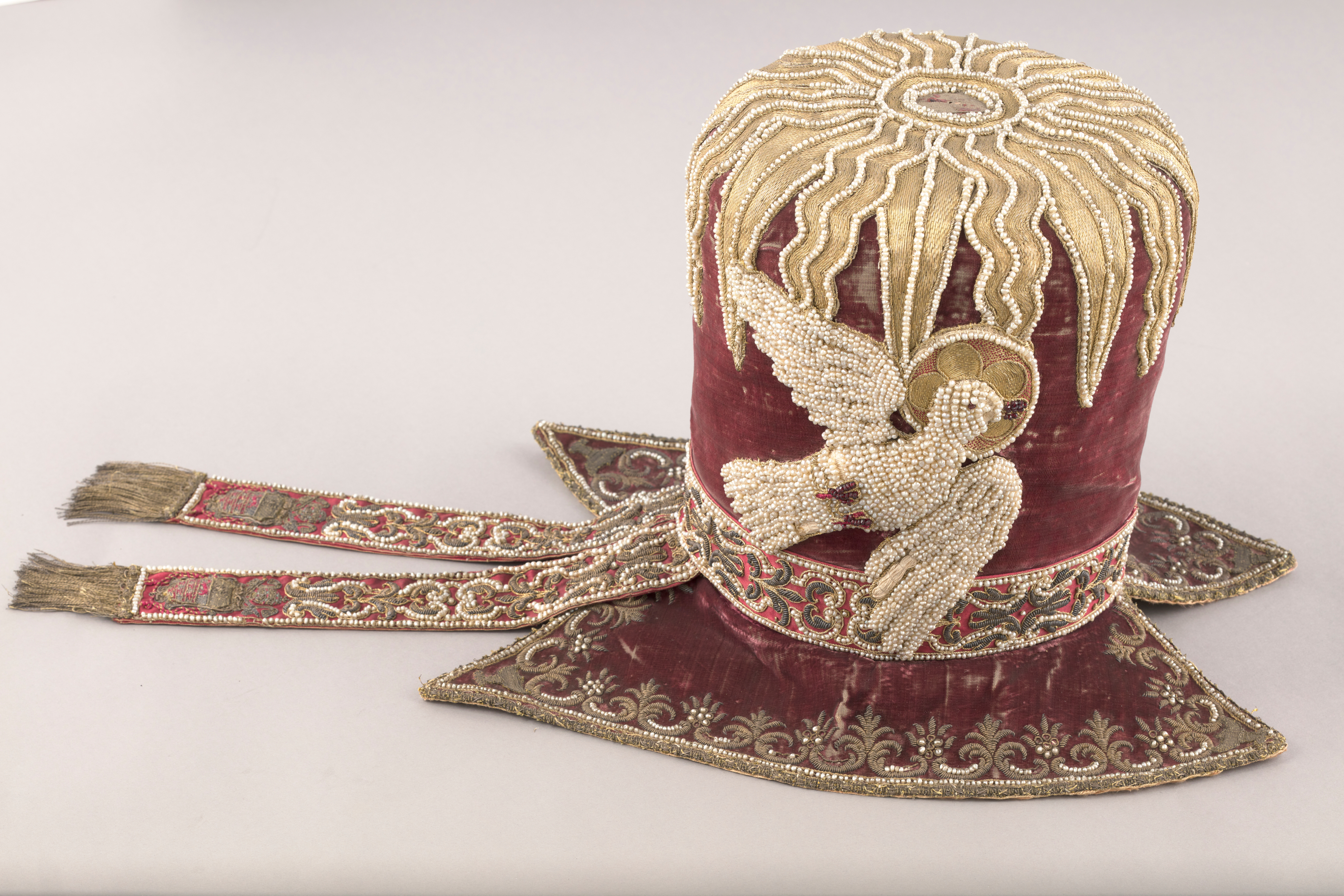
The blessed hat of King John III Sobieski of Poland

The hat had the form of a stiff high cylinder surrounded by a deep brim, which curved upwards to a point at the front. In the back hanged two lappets, similar to those in a bishop's mitre. The hat was made of beaver pelt or velvet, typically dark crimson in colour, although grey and black are also mentioned in some accounts. It was sometimes lined with ermine. A haloed dove, symbolizing the Holy Spirit, was embroidered in goldwork and adorned with pearls on the right hand side of the cylinder.

On top of the hat, a shining sun with alternatively straight and wavy rays that descended towards the brim, was likewise picked out in gold thread. The image of a dove symbolized the Holy Spirit protecting and guiding whoever was wearing the hat. The Holy Spirit together with Christ the Sun God may also be interpreted as symbolic references to God's incarnation, a mystery celebrated on Christmas, on the eve of which the hat and the sword were blessed by a pope.

Ten blessed swords from the 15th century have survived to present times, and about a dozen from the 16th century, although in some cases only the blade remains, while the more valuable hilt and scabbard have been lost. The hats, made of less durable materials, have been preserved in still smaller numbers, the earliest being from the second half of the 16th century. It is even impossible to ascertain whether the hat had always accompanied the sword from the beginning of the tradition or if it was a later addition.

== Ceremony ==
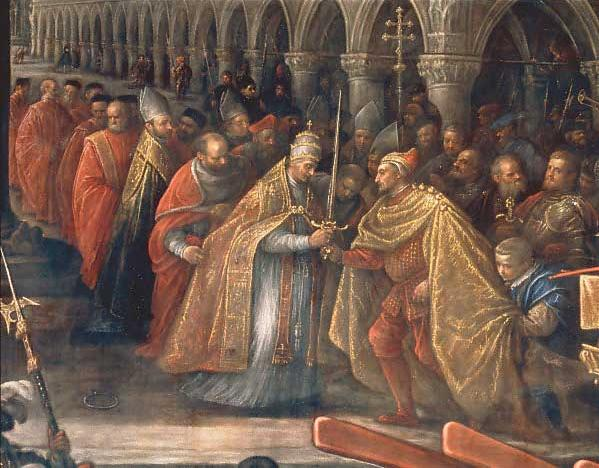
A doge of Venice receiving a sword from a pope, as painted by Francesco Bassano in 1592

Popes used to bless the sword and the hat on every Christmas Eve. The blessing took place just before the matins in a simple ceremony conducted by the pope either in one of the private chapels of the papal palace or in the sacristy of St. Peter's Basilica. The pope, vested in an alb, amice, cincture and white stole, blessed both items held before him by a kneeling chamberlain by reciting a short prayer, the earliest form of which is attributed to Sixtus IV (r. 1471–1481). Then, the pope sprinkled the sword and hat with holy water and incensed them thrice before putting on a cappa (a long train of crimson silk) and proceeding to the basilica.

If the person whom the pope intended to award with the blessed sword and hat was present, he was invested with them immediately. Dressed in a surplice over his secular robes, the recipient was brought before the pope, who addressed him with Sixtus IV's brief Solent Romani pontifices, explaining the symbolism of the gift. It ended with the following words:

"[...] we appoint you, holy prince, as another sword of the Holy See, which has, we declare by this fine gift, a most devout son in you, and also by this hat we declare that you are a fortification and bulwark to protect the holy Roman Church against the enemies of the Faith. Therefore, may your hand remain firm against the enemies of the Holy See and of the name of Christ, and may your right hand be lifted up, intrepid warrior, as you remove them from the earth, and may your head be protected against them by the Holy Spirit, symbolized by the pearly dove, in those things deemed worthy by the Son of God, together with the Father and the Holy Spirit. Amen."

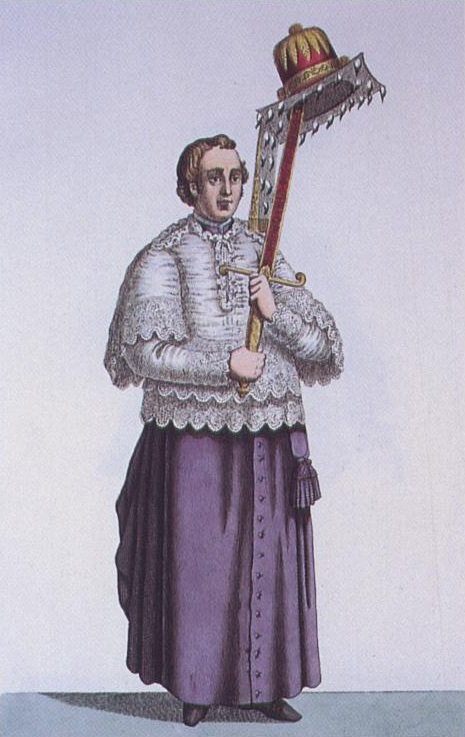
Papal chamberlain carrying a blessed sword and hat during Christmas matins

The sword was then girded over the recipient's surplice and he was dressed in a white cope. The morse of the cope was fastened on his right shoulder so as to free his arm for drawing the sword later in the ceremony. The prince kissed the pope's hand and slipper as a sign of obeisance and, with his sword and hat, joined the procession to the basilica. During the matins, the recipient sang the fifth lesson, beginning with the words In quo conflictu pro nobis inito, taken from the homily of Saint Leo. An exception was made for emperors, who sang the seventh lesson, which begins with a quote from the Biblical account of the Census of Quirinius, Exiit edictum a Caesare Augusto ut describeretur universus orbis ("In those days a decree went out from Emperor Augustus that all the world should be registered"; Luke 2:1), deemed more appropriate because of the imperial connection. Before singing the lesson, the prince removed his hat and handed it to his servant, then unsheathed the sword, struck it against the ground three times, then brandished it in the air, again three times, and replaced it in the scabbard. As the matins ended, the recipient took leave of the pope and returned to his residence in Rome, preceded by a man-at-arms carrying the blessed sword and hat, and followed by cardinals, prelates, papal chamberlains, ambassadors to the Holy See, friends and retinue.

If the prospective honouree was absent at the ceremony, the sword and hat, after being blessed, were carried by the chamberlain before the cross in the procession and placed on the epistle side of the altar in the basilica. The gifts were then dispatched by the pope by a special emissary to present them to their intended recipient in a ceremony extra curiam (outside of the Holy See). The protocol was modelled on that prescribed for bestowing the golden rose outside Rome. The emissary, entrusted with the sword and hat, instructed about the proper protocol, equipped with the pope's letter to the honouree, as well as a safe conduct pass, set out with a small retinue, usually in the spring following the blessing ceremony. When the emissary was within a day's journey from his destination, the recipient was expected to send forth a delegation to escort the emissary to his lodgings. The papal brief was delivered to the prince who then had to choose the venue and date of the ceremony. Typically, the ceremony took place on a Sunday or a major feast day in a cathedral or the major church of the town. A solemn mass was celebrated either by the emissary or by a local bishop or abbot indicated by the pope. The pope's letter was solemnly read during the mass, following which the prince received the blessed sword and hat from the hands of the celebrant. When the ceremony was over, the recipient returned to his residence in a procession, as it would happen in Rome.

== Recipients ==
Year blessed	Year bestowed	Pope	Recipient	Image of the sword and/or hat	Notes	Current location	References
1202		Innocent III	William the Lion, King of Scots		Disputed		Burns 1969, pp. 161–162
1204		Innocent III	Peter II, King of Aragon		Disputed		Burns 1969, pp. 151, 162
1347	1347	Clement VI	Charles IV, Emperor of the Holy Roman Empire		Uncertain		Burns 1969, p. 161
1365	1365	Urban V	Louis I, Duke of Anjou		Presented personally		Müntz 1889, p. 409; Warmington 2000, p. 109
1366	1366	Urban V	John I, Count of Armagnac		Presented personally		Müntz 1889, p. 409
1371	1371	Gregory XI	Louis I, Duke of Anjou (again)		Presented personally		Müntz 1889, pp. 409–410
1386	1386	Urban VI	Fortiguerra Fortiguerri, Gonfaloniere of the Republic of Lucca				Burns 1969, p. 160; Pinti 2001, p. 3
	1414	Antipope John XXIII	Sigismund, Emperor of the Holy Roman Empire				Müntz 1890, p. 281
1419		Martin V	Charles, Dauphin of France (future King Charles VII)		Uncertain		Warmington 2000, p. 109
1422		Martin V	Louis III, King of Naples				Warmington 2000, p. 109
1432		Eugene IV	Vladislaus II, King of Poland		Disputed		Lileyko 1987, p. 123
1434		Eugene IV	Republic of Florence				Müntz 1890, p. 281
	1443	Eugene IV	Vladislaus III, King of Poland and Hungary		Probably lost in the Battle of Varna		Warmington 2000, p. 110; Lileyko 1987, p. 123
1446		Eugene IV	John II, King of Castile	Blessed sword of John II of Castile	Oldest preserved blessed sword	Spain: Madrid; Royal Armoury	Warmington 2000, p. 110; Lileyko 1987, p. 123
1449	1450	Nicholas V	Francesco Foscari, Doge of Venice	Blessed sword of Francesco Foscari	Blade preserved	Italy: Venice; Doge's Palace	Warmington 2000, p. 110; Pinti 2001, p. 4
1450	1450	Nicholas V	Albert VI, Archduke of Austria				Warmington 2000, p. 110; Pinti 2001, p. 7
	1454	Nicholas V	Count of Sant'Angelo, ambassador of Naples		Presented personally		Warmington 2000, p. 110
1454	1455	Nicholas V	Ludovico Bentivoglio, ambassador of Bologna	Blessed sword of Ludovico Bentivoglio	Sword and scabbard preserved	Italy: Bologna; Palazzo Ghisilardi Fava (Medieval Civic Museum)	Müntz 1890, p. 283; Pinti 2001, pp. 4, 19
1456	1457	Calixtus III	Charles VII, King of France				Warmington 2000, pp. 123–128
1457	1458	Calixtus III	Henry IV, King of Castile		Blade preserved	Spain: Madrid; Royal Armoury	Warmington 2000, pp. 123–128; Müntz 1890, p. 284
1458	1459	Pius II	Frederick III, Emperor of the Holy Roman Empire				Warmington 2000, pp. 123–128
1459	1460	Pius II	Albert III Achilles, Margrave of Brandenburg-Ansbach		Presented personally at the Council of Mantua. The sword later became the Electoral Sword (Kurschwert) of Brandenburg, preserved to this day.	Germany: Berlin; Charlottenburg Palace	Warmington 2000, pp. 123–128; Kühn 1967
1460	1461	Pius II	Philip the Good, Duke of Burgundy				Warmington 2000, pp. 123–128
1461	1462	Pius II	Louis XI, King of France				Warmington 2000, pp. 123–128
1462	1463	Pius II	Cristoforo Moro, Doge of Venice	Blessed sword of Cristoforo Moro	Blade preserved	Italy: Venice; Doge's Palace	Warmington 2000, pp. 123–128; Pinti 2001, p. 4
1466	1466	Pius II	Skanderbeg, Lord of Albania		Presented personally		Warmington 2000, pp. 123–128
1467 or 1469		Paul II	Henry IV, King of Castile				Warmington 2000, pp. 123–128
1468	1468	Paul II	Frederick III, Emperor of the Holy Roman Empire		Presented personally		Warmington 2000, pp. 123–128
1470	1471	Paul II	Matthias Corvinus, King of Hungary				Warmington 2000, pp. 123–128
	1471	Paul II	Borso d'Este, Duke of Ferrara		Presented personally		Warmington 2000, pp. 123–128
1474	1475	Sixtus IV	Philibert I, Duke of Savoy				Warmington 2000, pp. 123–128
1477	1477	Sixtus IV	Alfonso, Duke of Calabria (future King Alfonso II of Naples)		Presented personally		Warmington 2000, pp. 123–128
1480	1480	Sixtus IV	Federico da Montefeltro, Duke of Urbino				Warmington 2000, pp. 123–128
1481	1482	Sixtus IV	Edward IV, King of England				Warmington 2000, pp. 123–128
1482	1482	Sixtus IV	Alfonso, Duke of Calabria (future King Alfonso II of Naples, again)		Presented personally		Warmington 2000, pp. 123–128
1484	1484	Innocent VIII	Francesco of Aragon, ambassador of Naples		Presented personally		Warmington 2000, pp. 123–128
Between 1484 and 1492		Innocent VIII	Ferdinand II, King of Aragon				Warmington 2000, pp. 123–128
1486	1486	Innocent VIII	Íñigo López de Mendoza y Quiñones, Count of Tendilla, ambassador of Castile and Aragon		Presented personally. Sword and scabbard preserved.	Spain: Madrid; Lázaro Galdiano Museum	Warmington 2000, pp. 123–128; Spain is Culture
1488	1488	Innocent VIII	Giovanni Giacomo Trivulzio, general of the ecclesiastical army		Presented personally		Warmington 2000, pp. 123–128
1491	1491	Innocent VIII	William III, Landgrave of Hesse	Blessed sword of William III of Hesse	Presented personally. Sword, scabbard and belt preserved.	Germany: Kassel; Museumslandschaft Hessen	Warmington 2000, pp. 123–128; Museumslandschaft Hessen Kassel
1492	1492	Alexander VI	Frederick, Crown Prince of Naples (future King Frederick IV)		Presented personally		Warmington 2000, pp. 123–128
1493	1494	Alexander VI	Maximilian I, King of the Romans				Warmington 2000, pp. 123–128
1494	1494	Alexander VI	Ferdinand, Duke of Calabria		Presented personally		Warmington 2000, pp. 123–128
1496	1497	Alexander VI	Philip the Fair, Archduke of Austria				Warmington 2000, pp. 123–128
1497	1497	Alexander VI	Bogislaw X, Duke of Pomerania	Blessed sword of Bogislaw X	Presented personally. Used as part of ducal insignia by subsequent dukes of Pomerania.		Warmington 2000, pp. 123–128; Lileyko 1987, p. 124
1498	1499	Alexander VI	Louis XII, King of France				Warmington 2000, pp. 123–128
	1500	Alexander VI	Cesare Borgia, Duke of Valentinois, Captain General of the Church, pope's son	Blessed sword of Cesare Borgia	Originally Cesare Borgia's private sword made during his cardinalate (1493–1498), then repurposed by his father as a blessed sword, with an additional blessing and decorations etched into the blade, and awarded back to Cesare upon his promotion to Captain General of the Church. The leather scabbard, decorated with a scene of an offering to Venus, the patron goddess of the house of Julius Caesar (Cesare Borgia's namesake), was created later during the 16th century.	Italy: Rome; Palazzo Caetani (sword); United Kingdom: London; Victoria and Albert Museum (scabbard)	Burns 1969, p. 163; Bemis 2018, pp. 41–45
1501	1502	Alexander VI	Alfonso d'Este, heir to the Duchy of Ferrara, pope's son-in-law				Warmington 2000, pp. 123–128
1506	1507	Julius II	James IV, King of Scots		The sword later became the Scottish Sword of State, preserved to this day together with its scabbard and belt.	United Kingdom: Edinburgh; Edinburgh Castle	Burns 1969, pp. 172–173
1508	1509	Julius II	Vladislaus II, King of Bohemia and Hungary		Sword preserved	Hungary: Budapest; National Museum	Lileyko 1987, p. 123; Burns 1969, p. 174
1510	1511	Julius II	Switzerland	Swiss guards holding papal banners, as well as blessed sword and hat	Sword preserved	Switzerland: Zurich; National Museum	Burns 1969, p. 174; Pinti 2001, p. 4
1513		Leo X	Henry VIII, King of England				Burns 1969, p. 180
1514		Leo X	Manuel I, King of Portugal				Burns 1969, p. 180
1515		Leo X	Republic of Florence (again)				Burns 1969, p. 180
1516		Leo X	Francis I, King of France		Uncertain		Burns 1969, p. 180
1517		Leo X	Maximilian I, Emperor of the Holy Roman Empire		Uncertain		Burns 1969, p. 180
	1525	Clement VII	Sigismund I, King of Poland		Lost before 1669		Lileyko 1987, p. 124
	1529	Clement VII	Charles V, Emperor of the Holy Roman Empire		Blade preserved	Spain: Madrid; Royal Armoury	Pinti 2001, p. 12
1536	1537	Paul III	James V, King of Scots		Lost between 1542 and 1556		Burns 1969, pp. 181–183
	1540	Paul III	Sigismund II Augustus, King of Poland		Lost after 1795		Lileyko 1987, p. 124
	1550	Paul III	Philip, Prince of Asturias (future King Philip II of Spain)		Blade preserved	Spain: Madrid; Royal Armoury	Pinti 2001, p. 12
1555	1558	Paul IV	Ercole II d'Este, Duke of Ferrara		Sword preserved	Czech Republic: Benešov; Konopiště Castle	Pinti 2001, pp. 12, 30
	1560	Pius IV	Philip II, King of Spain (again)		Blade preserved	Spain: Madrid; Royal Armoury	Pinti 2001, p. 12
	1563	Pius IV	Carlos, Prince of Asturias		Blade preserved	Spain: Madrid; Royal Armoury	Pinti 2001, p. 12
	1566	Pius V	Fernando Álvarez de Toledo y Pimentel, Duke of Alba		Blade preserved		Sampedro Escolar 2007, p. 97/8
1567	1568	Pius V	Ferdinand II, Archduke of Further Austria		Sword and hat preserved	Austria: Vienna; Kunsthistorisches Museum	Pinti 2001, p. 6; Burns 1969, p. 163; Kunsthistorisches Museum
	1580	Gregory XIII	Stephen Báthory, King of Poland	Blade of the blessed sword of Stephen Báthory	Blade preserved	Poland: Kraków; Wawel Castle	Lileyko 1987, p. 124
1581	1582	Gregory XIII	Ferdinand II, Archduke of Further Austria (again)		Sword and hat preserved	Austria: Vienna	Pinti 2001, p. 5; Burns 1969, p. 163
1585	1586	Sixtus V	Alessandro Farnese, Duke of Parma and Piacenza		Presented by Abbot Grimani at the abbey of Gnadenthal, Germany. Lost.		Marek y Villarino de Brugge 2020, p. 58
	1591	Gregory XIV	Philip, Prince of Asturias (future King Philip III of Spain)		Blade preserved	Spain: Madrid; Royal Armoury	Pinti 2001, p. 12
	1594	Clement VII	Philip III, King of Spain (again)		Blade preserved	Spain: Madrid; Royal Armoury	Pinti 2001, p. 12
	1618	Paul V	Philip, Prince of Asturias (future King Philip IV of Spain)				Pinti 2001, p. 12
	1625	Urban VIII	Vladislaus Sigismund Vasa, Crown Prince of Poland (future King Vladislaus IV)		Presented personally. Blade preserved.	Sweden: Skokloster Castle	Lileyko 1987, pp. 124–125
	1672	Clement X	Michael Korybut Wiśniowiecki, King of Poland		Lost after 1673		Lileyko 1987, p. 126
1674	(1684)	Clement X	John Sobieski, Grand Hetman of the Polish Crown (future King of Poland)		Awarded in recognition of Sobieski's victory over the Ottoman Turks in the battle of Khotyn, but not bestowed due to Sobieski's pro-French sympathies. Blade preserved (see below).	Poland: Kraków; Wawel Castle	Lileyko 1987, pp. 126–127
1683	1684	Innocent XI	John III Sobieski, King of Poland (again)	Blessed sword with scabbard and belt, and blessed hat awarded by Pope Innocent XI to King John III Sobieski in 1684, as well as the blade of the sword Pope Clement X intended to award him in 1674	Awarded in recognition of Sobieski's victory over the Ottoman Turks in the battle of Vienna. Innocent XI reused the sword and the hat originally made for Sobieski in 1674, but replaced the blade with one bearing his own name and coat of arms. The old blade was sent to Poland as well. The sword was used by Emperor Nicholas I of Russia for his coronation as King of Poland in 1829. Sword (as well as the old blade), scabbard, belt and hat preserved.	Poland: Kraków; Wawel Castle	Lileyko 1987, pp. 126–127
1689	1690	Alexander VIII	Francesco Morosini, Doge of Venice		Sword with scabbard and belt preserved	Italy: Venice; St Mark's Basilica treasury	Pinti 2001, pp. 4, 28
	1726	Benedict XIII	Frederick Augustus, Crown Prince of Poland (future King Augustus III)		Scabbard, belt and hat preserved	Germany: Dresden; Dresden Armoury	Lileyko 1987, p. 129
1747		Benedict XIV	Manuel Pinto da Fonseca, Grand Master of the Knights Hospitaller	Blessed sword and hat of Manuel Pinto together papal crossed keys			Petroschi & Rossi 1747
1772	1773 or 1775	Clement XIV	Francisco Ximénez de Tejada, Grand Master of the Knights Hospitaller		Sent by Pius VI. Latest preserved blessed sword.	France: Paris; National Museum of the Middle Ages	Lileyko 1987, p. 123; Pinti 2001, p. 6
1823		Leo XII	Louis Antoine, Duke of Angoulême				Pinti 2001, p. 3

== See also ==
- Golden Rose
- List of ecclesiastical decorations
