= William Koch =

William Koch may refer to:

- William Frederick Koch (1885–1967), American medical doctor and pharmaceutical entrepreneur
- William C. Koch Jr. (born 1947), former justice of the Tennessee Supreme Court

== See also ==
- Bill Koch (disambiguation), for those people known as "Bill" or "Billy"
