= Justin Frye =

American football player and coach (born 1983)

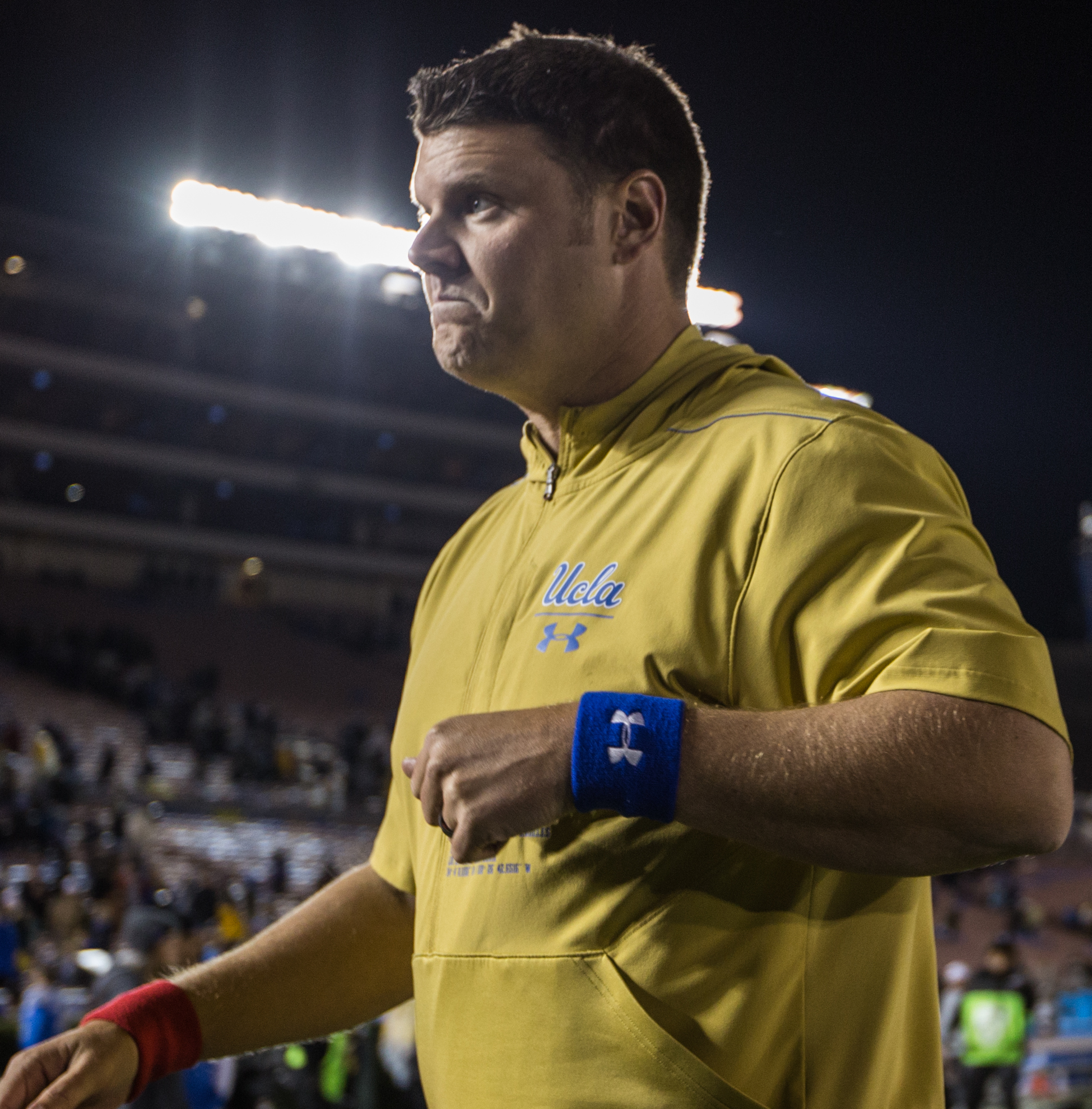
- Frye in 2019.

Arizona Cardinals
- Title: Offensive line coach

Personal information
- Born: September 19, 1983 (age 43)
- Listed height: 6 ft 5 in (1.96 m)
- Listed weight: 302 lb (137 kg)

Career information
- Position: Offensive tackle (No. 60)
- High school: Elwood (Elwood, Indiana)
- College: Indiana (2002-2006)

Career history
- Indiana (2007–2008) Graduate assistant; Florida (2009–2010) Graduate assistant; Temple (2011–2012) Offensive line coach; Boston College (2013–2017) Offensive line coach; UCLA (2018) Offensive line coach; UCLA (2019–2021) Offensive coordinator & offensive line coach; Ohio State (2022–2024) Offensive line coach; Arizona Cardinals (2025–present) Offensive line coach

Awards and highlights
- CFP national champion (2024)

Justin Michael Frye (born September 19, 1983) is an American professional football coach and former offensive tackle who is the offensive line coach for the Arizona Cardinals of the National Football League (NFL).

== Playing career ==
Frye attended Elwood High School in his hometown of Elwood, Indiana, where he played on the offensive line. He went on to play college football for Indiana for five seasons, from 2002 to 2006. At Indiana, Frye set the school record for most consecutive starts by an offensive lineman, with 45 consecutive starts.

Pre-draft measurables
Height	Weight
6 ft 4 3/4 in (1.95 m)	302 lb (137 kg)
Values from Pro Day

== Coaching career ==
=== Indiana ===
Frye began his coaching career as a graduate assistant for his alma mater, Indiana. At Indiana, Frye worked with the offensive line and the tight ends from 2007 to 2008.

=== Florida ===
Frye went on to serve as a graduate assistant for the Florida Gators, where he worked with the offensive line. At Florida, Frye worked with multiple future NFL Draft picks, including Maurkice Pouncey, Mike Pouncey, Marcus Gilbert, and Maurice Hurt.

=== Temple ===
Following his stint at Florida, Frye landed his first job as an offensive line coach for the Temple Owls in 2011. In Frye's first year at Temple, the Owls ranked seventh in the nation in rushing yards, at 256.5 yards per game, and they set school records for the most rushing yards and most rushing touchdowns in a season. In 2012, Frye's second season with the program, the Owls once again enjoyed a prolific rushing offense with a Big East Conference-leading 201.2 rushing yards per game.

=== Boston College ===
In 2013, Frye left Temple to become the offensive line coach at Boston College, where he coached for five seasons. In Frye's first season with the program, his offensive line paved the way for Andre Williams to become the first Doak Walker Award recipient in Atlantic Coast Conference (ACC) history. Guided by Frye's offensive line, Williams rushed for 2,177 yards, with a nation-leading 167.5 yards per game. Williams also finished fourth in Heisman Trophy voting. In Frye's second season (2014), the Eagles rushed for 254.7 yards per game, and their offensive line allowed just 21 sacks, the 29th-fewest in the nation. Following that season, two of Frye's linemen, Ian Silberman and Adam Gallik, were both selected in the 2015 NFL draft. In 2016, Frye's fourth season, the Eagles' offense led the ACC and ranked 11th in the country in time of possession. In Frye's final season at Boston College (2017), the Eagles averaged 220.4 yards rushing, good for 25th in the nation, and the Eagles' offensive line allowed only 15 sacks the entire season.

=== UCLA ===
In 2018, Chip Kelly hired Frye as the offensive line coach at UCLA. Despite UCLA's 3–9 record in Frye's inaugural season with the Bruins, the Bruins' rushing attack improved by over 40 yards per game from the previous season. Additionally, running back Joshua Kelley rushed for 1,243 yards in 2018, including 289 yards against crosstown rival USC; Kelley's 289 yards were the most generated by a running back in the history of the UCLA–USC rivalry. Over the final eight games of the season, UCLA averaged over 432 yards of offense per game, including over 164 rushing yards per game. Following the 2018 season, Frye was promoted to offensive coordinator, although he continued to coach the Bruins' offensive line.

=== Ohio State ===
On January 11, 2022, it was announced that Frye would take the position of associate head coach for offense and offensive line coach for the Ohio State Buckeyes, succeeding former offensive line coach Greg Studrawa, who was fired on January 6, 2022. Frye and Buckeyes' head coach Ryan Day coached together at Temple in 2012, and at Boston College in 2013 and 2014. Chip Kelly eventually reunited with him at Ohio State when he took the offensive coordinator position for the Buckeyes in 2024. Ohio State finished the 2024 season with a 14–2 record and won the College Football Playoff National Championship at the conclusion of the season.

=== Arizona Cardinals ===
On February 12, 2025, Frye was hired by the Arizona Cardinals as their offensive line coach under head coach Jonathan Gannon.

== Personal life ==
Frye is married to Lauren Frye (née Torpey), with whom he has four children: Kevin, Zoe, Max, and Welles.
