= Craig Boller =

American football player and coach (born 1948)

Biographical details
- Born: January 29, 1948; Belmond, Iowa, U.S.

Playing career
- 1966–1969: Iowa State

Coaching career (HC unless noted)
- 1974–1975: William Penn (assistant)
- 1976: William Penn
- 1977: Tennessee (DL)
- 1978–1979: Memphis (DL)
- 1980–1986: Oregon State (assistant)
- 1987–1994: Iowa State (DT)
- 1996–1997: Dallas Cowboys (DL)
- 2002–2009: Memphis (DL)

Head coaching record
- Overall: 8–2

Accomplishments and honors

Championships
- 1 IIAC (1976)

Craig Boller (born January 29, 1948) is an American former football player and coach. He served as the head football coach at William Penn University in Oskaloosa, Iowa in 1976, compiling a record of 8–2. Boller was the defensive line coach for the Dallas Cowboys of the National Football League (NFL) from 1996 to 1997.

== Head coaching record ==
=== College ===
Year	Team	Overall	Conference	Standing	Bowl/playoffs
William Penn Statesmen (Iowa Intercollegiate Athletic Conference) (1976–1987)
1976	William Penn	8–2	6–1	1st	
William Penn:		8–2	6–1		
Total:		8–2			
National championship Conference title Conference division title or championship game berth
