= Anton Peffenhauser =

- Born: 1525; Augsburg
- Died: 1603 (aged 77–78)

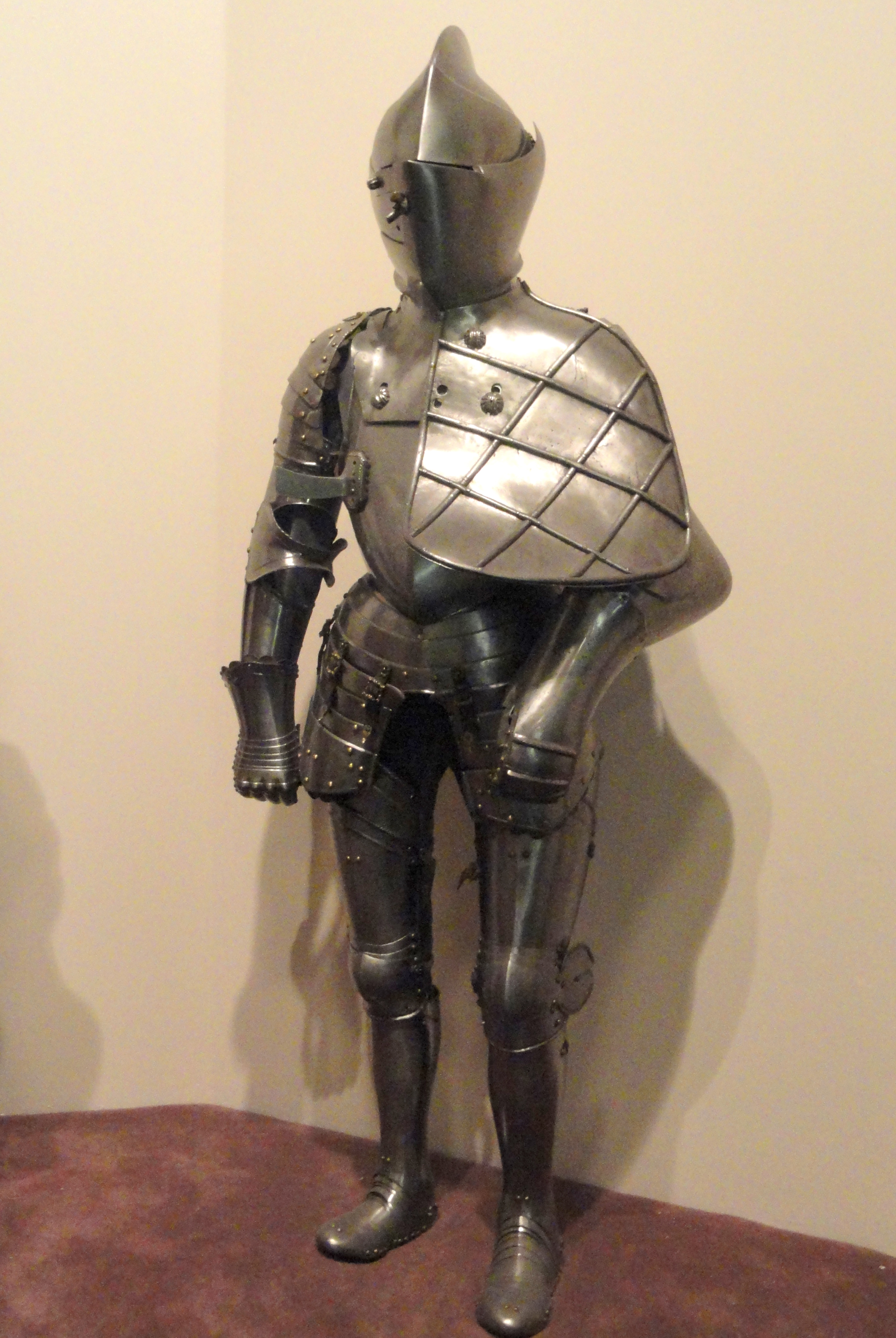
Composite armor for the Italian joust, Higgins Armory Museum

Anton Peffenhauser (1525–1603) was the foremost armourer in Augsburg during the late 16th century. He was trained by members of the Helmschmied family. He frequently collaborated with the armor etcher, Jörg Sorg the Younger (1525–1603), his exact contemporary, and their works are documented in a manuscript known as the Stuttgarter Harnischmüsterbuch. Peffenhauser worked for numerous princes in the Holy Roman Empire and beyond, and his workshop was especially favored by the Prince-Electors of Saxony, the Dukes of Bavaria, and members of the Spanish court.

Today's Peffenhauser's works can be found in the Metropolitan Museum of Art, the Kunsthistorisches Museum, the Dresden Armory, the Royal Armouries, the Art Institute of Chicago, the Detroit Institute of Arts, the Wallace Collection, and many other world-class institutions. Though his works were frequently etched, rather than embossed, one of his reliefs in armor believed to have been owned by King Sebastian of Portugal, bears his mark and is now in the Royal Armoury of Madrid.
