= Bill Koch =

Bill Koch may refer to:

- Bill Koch (businessman) (born 1940), American businessman and yachtsman who won 1992 America's Cup
- Bill Koch (skier) (born 1955), American cross-country skier
- Bill Koch (American football), football coach

== See also ==
- Billy Koch (born 1974), American baseball player
