= Filippo Negroli =

Armourer from Milan (1510–1579)

- Born: c. 1510; Milan
- Died: 1579 (aged 68–69)
- Parent: Father Gian Giacomo Negroli (ca. 1463-1543)
- Engineering career
- Discipline: Armourer
- Practice name: Metalworker

Filippo Negroli (ca. 1510–1579) was an armourer from Milan. He was renowned as being extremely skilled, and may be considered the most famous armourer of all time. Working together with his younger brothers Giovan Battista (ca. 1511–1591) and Francesco (ca. 1522–1600) in the Negroli family workshop headed by their father Gian Giacomo Negroli (ca. 1463–1543).

== Armour ==
Filippo was specialized in the repoussé of armour. His brother Francesco was renowned for his damascening skills. Filippo's pieces are considered especially remarkable because they were wrought in steel, rather than the more-easily worked iron that was the traditionally assumed medium.

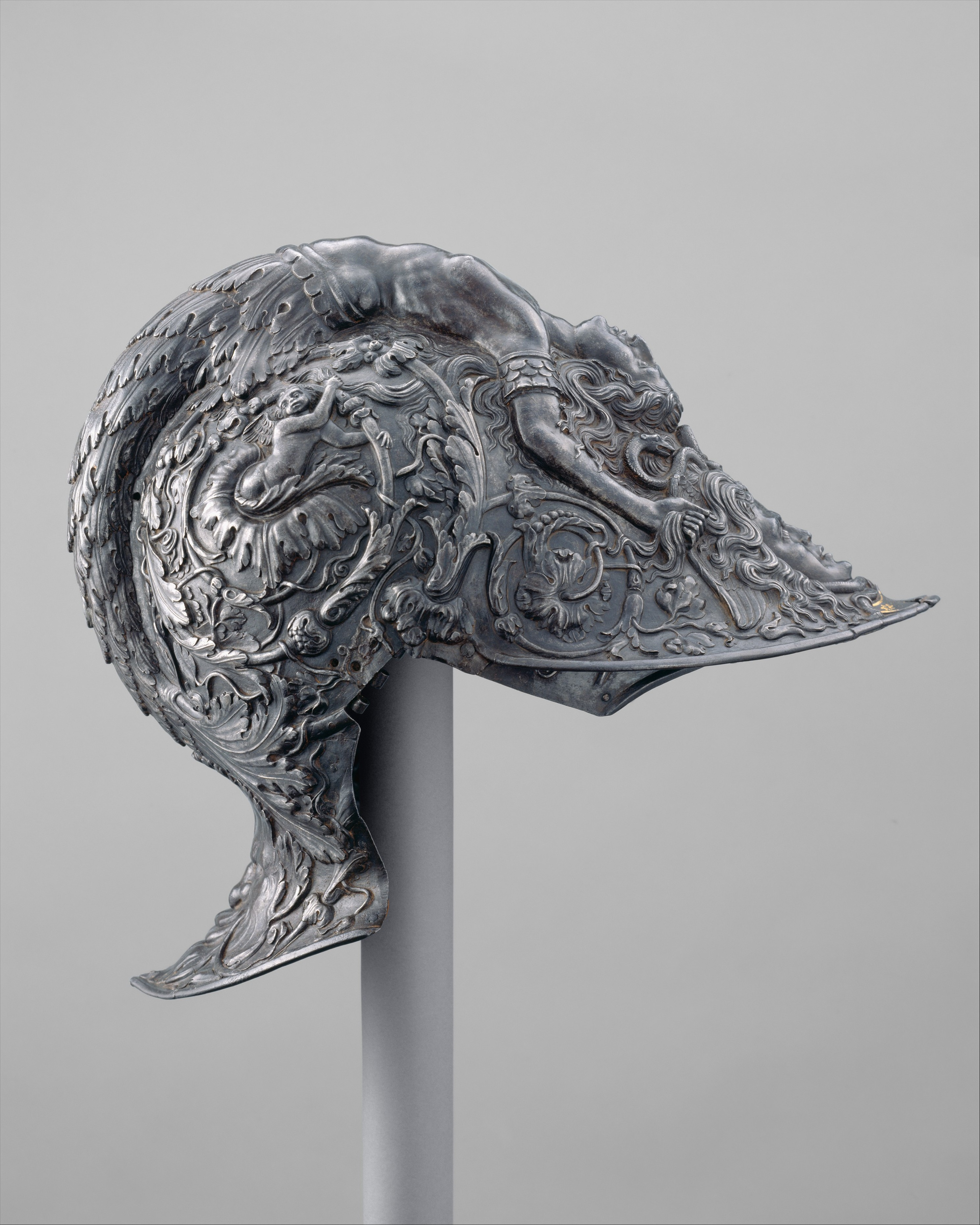
A burgonet by Filippo Negroli. Italian, Milan, ca. 1510–1579. Located at the Metropolitan Museum of Art, New York.

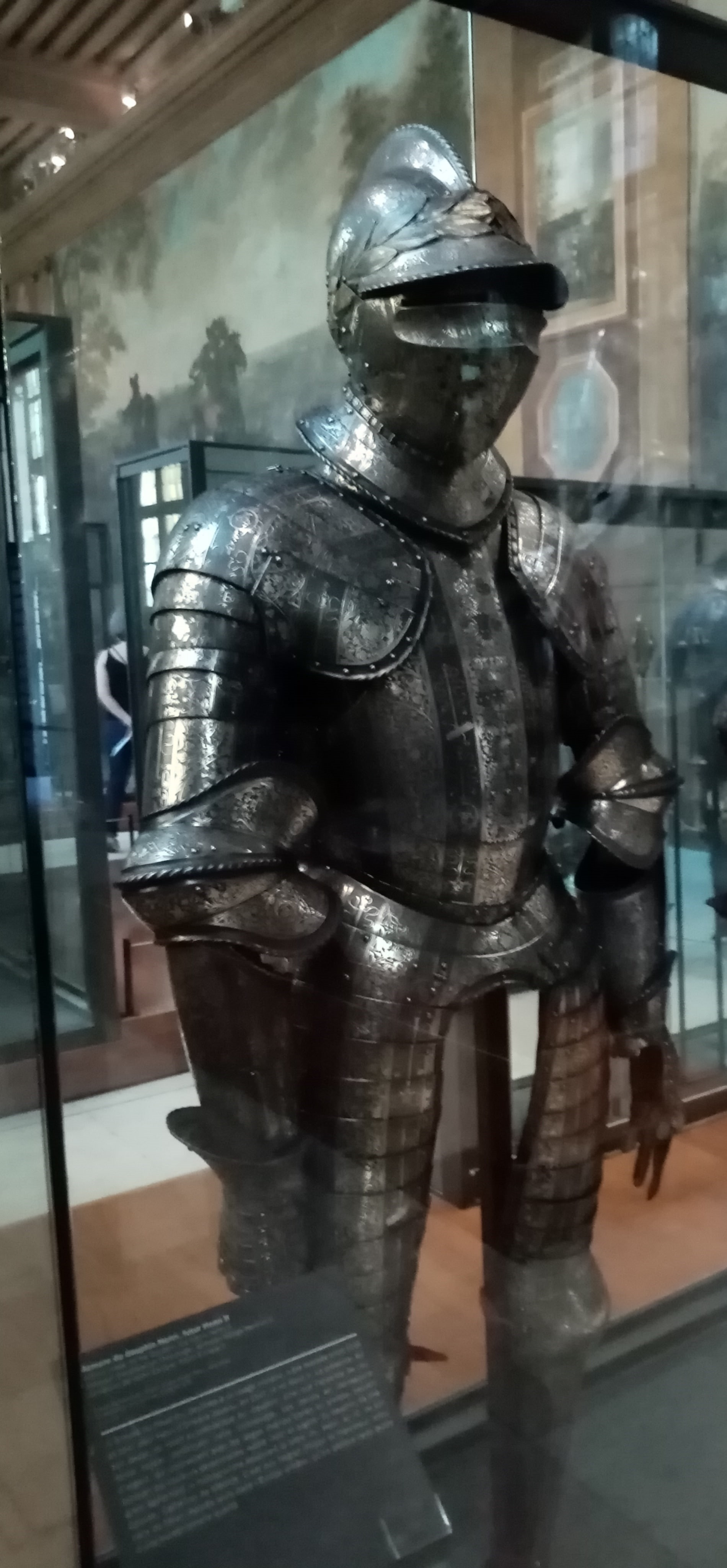
“Armor of the dauphin”, attributed to the future Henry II by Filippo and Francesco Negroli. Italian, Milan ca. 1510–1579. Located at the Musée de l'Armée, Paris.

He made parade armour for several esteemed clients, including Charles V, Holy Roman Emperor and Guidobaldo II della Rovere.

Examples of his work include:

- Burgonet of Charles V at La Real Armería, Madrid, Spain.
- Burgonetat the Metropolitan Museum of Art.
- Burgonet at the Wallace Collection.
- Burgonet "Alla Romana Antica" at Kunsthistorisches Museum.
- Armor of the "dauphin" attributed to the future Henry II at Musée de l'Armée.

== Bibliography ==
- Famous Makers and European Centers of Arms and Armor Production. The Metropolitan Museum of Art.
- Alan R. Williams. The Steel of the Negroli. The Metropolitan Museum of Art.
- Stuart W. Pyhrr and Jose-A. Godoy (1988),Heroic Armor of the Italian Renaissance: Filippo Negroli and his Contemporaries. The Metropolitan Museum of Art.

== See also ==
- Pompeo della Cesa
