= Rocco Calvo =

American sports coach (1929–1995)

Biographical details
- Born: December 15, 1929; Bethlehem, Pennsylvania, U.S.
- Died: August 12, 1995 (aged 65); Bethlehem, Pennsylvania, U.S.

Playing career

Football
- 1947–1950: Cornell
- Position: Quarterback

Coaching career (HC unless noted)

Football
- 1955–1976: Moravian
- 1982–1986: Moravian

Basketball
- 1957–1967: Moravian

Baseball
- 1974–1982: Moravian

Administrative career (AD unless noted)
- 1975–1992: Moravian

Head coaching record
- Overall: 122–102–9 (football); 118–87 (basketball); 89–85–4 (baseball)

Accomplishments and honors

Championships
- Football; 1 MAC Southern Division (1970)

Raymond J. "Rocco" Calvo (December 15, 1929 – August 12, 1995) was an American football, basketball and baseball coach. He served two stints as the head football coach at Moravian College in Bethlehem, Pennsylvania, from 1955 to 1976 and 1982 to 1986, compiling a record of 122–102–9. Calvo was also the head basketball coach at Moravian from 1957 to 1967, tallying a mark of 118–87, and the school's head baseball coach from 1974 to 1982, amassing a record of 89–85–4.

== Head coaching record ==
=== Football ===
Year	Team	Overall	Conference	Standing	Bowl/playoffs
Moravian Greyhounds (Independent) (1955–1957)
1955	Moravian	6–1–1			
1956	Moravian	5–3			
1957	Moravian	4–2			
Moravian Greyhounds (Middle Atlantic Conference) (1958–1976)
1958	Moravian	4–4	3–3	T–4th (Northern College)	
1959	Moravian	3–5	2–4	6th (Northern College)	
1960	Moravian	1–6–1	1–5–1	9th (Northern College)	
1961	Moravian	4–3–1	4–1–1	3rd (Northern College)	
1962	Moravian	5–3	4–2	2nd (Northern College)	
1963	Moravian	2–4	2–4	4th (Northern College)	
1964	Moravian	4–4	3–4	4th (Northern College)	
1965	Moravian	5–4	4–4	5th (Northern College)	
1966	Moravian	4–4–1	4–4–1	T–5th (Northern College)	
1967	Moravian	3–6	3–6	8th (Northern College)	
1968	Moravian	3–6	3–6	6th (Northern College)	
1969	Moravian	6–3	6–3	4th (Southern College)	
1970	Moravian	6–1–2	6–1–2	1st (Southern)	
1971	Moravian	6–3	6–3	4th (Southern)	
1972	Moravian	3–7	3–6	7th (Southern)	
1973	Moravian	3–5–1	3–5–1	6th (Southern)	
1974	Moravian	5–5	4–2	4th (Southern)	
1975	Moravian	6–2–1	5–2–1	4th (Southern)	
1976	Moravian	7–2	6–2	3rd (Southern)	
Moravian Greyhounds (Middle Atlantic Conference) (1982–1986)
1982	Moravian	3–6	3–5	7th (Southern)	
1983	Moravian	6–3	5–3	4th	
1984	Moravian	7–2	6–2	T–2nd	
1985	Moravian	7–3	6–3	T–3rd	
1986	Moravian	4–5–1	3–5–1	T–6th	
Moravian:		122–102–9	95–85–8		
Total:		122–102–9			
National championship Conference title Conference division title or championship game berth
