= Chuck Dickerson =

American football coach (1937–2024)

Profile
- Position: Defensive tackle

Personal information
- Born: August 1, 1937; Hammond, Indiana, U.S.
- Died: February 6, 2024 (aged 86)

Career information
- High school: Roxana
- College: Illinois
- NFL draft: 1962: 9th round, 123rd overall pick

Career history

Playing
- Daytona Beach Thunderbirds (1963–1964); Toronto Rifles (1965)

Coaching
- Daytona Beach Thunderbirds (1963–1964) Offensive line coach; Toronto Rifles (1965) Assistant coach; Chicago Fire (1974) Special teams coordinator & defensive line coach; Elwood HS (IN) (1975–1976) Head coach; Toronto Argonauts (1977) Assistant coach; Toronto Argonauts (1978) Offensive line coach; Toronto Argonauts (1979) Defensive line coach; Minnesota (1983) Defensive coordinator; Memphis Showboats (1985) Defensive line coach; Buffalo Bills (1987–1989) Special assistant to the head coach; Buffalo Bills (1990–1991) Defensive line coach

Charles Hamor Dickerson (August 1, 1937 – February 6, 2024) was an American position coach in the National Football League and Canadian Football League and former sports radio host in Buffalo, New York.

== Early life ==
Dickerson was born in Hammond, Indiana, and raised in Wood River, Illinois. He was a three-sport athlete at Roxana High School and played football for two years at the University of Florida. After serving in the United States Marine Corps, Dickerson played as a defensive tackle for the University of Illinois.

== Career ==
Dickerson was drafted in the ninth round, 123rd overall, by the Cleveland Browns in the 1962 NFL draft.

Dickerson was the head coach for Elwood Jr/Sr High School for two seasons from 1975 to 1976 where he amassed an overall record of 12–8. In December 1976, he accepted the head coach position for the University of Olivet as the successor to Bob Friedlund who resigned after a winless 0–9 season. After nine days as head coach, Dickerson resigned to become an assistant coach for the Toronto Argonauts of the Canadian Football League (CFL).

Dickerson served one year as defensive coordinator for the Minnesota Golden Gophers football team in 1983. Amid a disastrous 1–10 season, Dickerson's defense gave up 518 points in 11 games; Marv Levy later quipped: "Think how many they would've scored if he wasn't a defensive genius."

Despite Levy's later low opinion of Dickerson, Levy would hire Dickerson as a defensive assistant for the Bills shortly after Levy assumed head coaching duties in 1986. Former coaches who employed Dickerson, and players who played under him, considered him "a buffoon" and "degrading;" Levy noted that "his idea of motivation was 'Hey, boy, get your fucking fat ass over here!'" Of the many coaches whom Levy employed during his coaching career, Dickerson left the worst lasting impression; Levy was on good terms with all of his other assistants.

=== Super Bowl XXVI controversy ===
Before Super Bowl XXVI, Dickerson mocked the Washington Redskins' famed offensive line, "The Hogs", in a television interview. Dickerson said Redskins tackle Joe Jacoby was "a Neanderthal -- he slobbers a lot, he probably kicks dogs in his neighborhood." He also said tackle Jim Lachey "has bad breath. Players will fall down without him even touching them."

Redskins coach Joe Gibbs got his hands on some tapes of Dickerson and played them at a team meeting on the night before the game, and by all accounts it was a factor in the Redskins' 37–24 thumping of the Bills. Levy later described the interview as "the girder that brought down the building." Levy fired Dickerson three days after the game. On December 19, 1994, Levy went on his regionally syndicated weekly coach's show to explain that Dickerson's behavior, both as a position coach and as a commentator, was "destructive to the Buffalo Bills, just as what he did as a member of every coaching staff he’s ever served on(.) That’s why he’s been fired more times than a Civil War cannon.”

=== Radio and television career ===
Dickerson began his broadcast career on WGR 550 in 1993, hosting a three-hour afternoon drive-time show for almost ten years, leaving the station in 2003. In his last year on air, he was forced to share a program with Mike Schopp, who had previously been Dickerson's nemesis at crosstown rival WNSA. It was speculated in the press that WGR released Dickerson from the station because it wanted to gain the rights to Sabres hockey broadcasts, which it purchased in 2004 along with radio station WNSA. Dickerson was replaced as Schopp's co-host by Chris "Bulldog" Parker.

Dickerson also appeared on CanWest Global television's Sportsline show in Toronto for several season's as an NFL commentator.

Dickerson's provocative attitude during his coaching career carried over into his radio career, and his early career began with a "promising start" before, within a year, becoming one of the most extreme sports talk hosts on-air at the time. His on-air style was similar to hockey's Don Cherry, with The Buffalo News columnist Alan Pergament noting, in a scathing obituary he withheld several weeks to avoid the impression of speaking ill of the dead, that Dickerson "made (...) Cherry seem like Mary Poppins." Dickerson was known for his blunt and provocative opinions, and his pushing the boundaries of decency acceptable on terrestrial radio in the 1990s, regularly using language such as "crap" and "hell," occasionally invoking Nazi references, and eviscerating his former co-workers on the Bills payroll, while heaping even further scorn on the Buffalo Sabres, at the time contending for the Stanley Cup. Levy responded of Dickerson's shtick: "That's his prerogative(, but) sometimes if you don't punch back, you're gonna get punched out." His closing catchphrase, "Who loves ya, baby?" is borrowed from Kojak .

As recently as the late 2000s, Dickerson hosted The Unofficial, Unauthorized Postgame Show after Bills games and cohosted The Bob Matthews Show Monday evenings on WHAM-AM 1180 in Rochester, New York. He returned to WGR in 2005, initially as a contributor, and then as host of the Extra Point after-show on Mondays beginning in 2007. (John Murphy later took over that time slot.) He had expressed interest in returning to Buffalo radio as late as 2021.

A similar character, "Chuck Dichter," appears in the 2002 made-for-TV movie Second String, portrayed by Jon Voight. The Super Bowl incident was also parodied (with Lucy van Pelt in the role of the Dickerson-like antagonist) in You're in the Super Bowl, Charlie Brown, in which a team of buffalo (Bisons) is subsequently clobbered by Snoopy's team after the rant.

== Personal life ==
Dickerson was married to his wife, Shirley, for over 60 years before her death due to COVID-19 in June 2020, and has an adult child (Chris) and several grandchildren.
