= Bob Bergman =

American football/track & field coach

Biographical details
- Education: Hanover College; Indiana University

Playing career

Football
- c. 1960: Hanover

Coaching career (HC unless noted)

Football
- 1961–1962: Westfield HS (IN) (assistant)
- 1963: Sheridan HS (IN) (assistant)
- 1964–1965: Attica HS (IN)
- 1966–1967: Greencastle HS (IN)
- 1968–1976: Rose Polytechnic / Rose–Hulman
- 1977–1978: DePauw

Track
- 1978: DePauw

Head coaching record
- Overall: 39–60–2 (college football)

Accomplishments and honors

Championships
- Football; 1 CAC (1975)

Robert Bergman is an American former football and track and field coach. He served as the head football coach at the Rose–Hulman Institute of Technology in Terre Haute, Indiana from 1968 to 1976 and DePauw University in Greencastle, Indiana from 1977 to 1978, compiling a career college football coaching record of 39–60–2.

Bergman graduated from Batesville High School in Batesville, Indiana and then attended Hanover College in Hanover, Indiana, where he played college football. He began his coaching career in the high school ranks in the state of Indiana, working as an assistant football, assistant basketball, and head track coach at Westfield High School and Sheridan High School. In 1964, he was named head football coach at Attica High School, where he served for two seasons. He held the same position at Greencastle High School in 1966 and 1967.

== Head coaching record ==
=== College football ===
Year	Team	Overall	Conference	Standing	Bowl/playoffs
Rose Polytechnic / Rose–Hulman Fightin' Engineers (NCAA College Division / Division III independent) (1968–1973)
1968	Rose Polytechnic	0–8			
1969	Rose Polytechnic	4–4			
1970	Rose Polytechnic	3–5–1			
1971	Rose–Hulman	3–6			
1972	Rose–Hulman	5–5			
1973	Rose–Hulman	4–5			
Rose–Hulman Fightin' Engineers (College Athletic Conference) (1974–1976)
1974	Rose–Hulman	5–3–1			
1975	Rose–Hulman	7–3	4–0	T–1st	
1976	Rose–Hulman	5–5	1–3		
Rose–Hulman:		36–44–2			
DePauw Tigers (NCAA Division III independent) (1977–1978)
1977	DePauw	1–9			
1978	DePauw	2–7			
DePauw:		3–16			
Total:		39–60–2			
National championship Conference title Conference division title or championship game berth
