= Robert Bergman (museum director) =

Robert P. Bergman (May 17, 1945 – May 6, 1999) was an art museum director and former professor. After studying at Princeton University, he initially pursued an academic career from 1971 to 1981, and held various professorships at Lincoln University, Princeton University, and then Harvard University. He served as the director of the Walters Art Gallery from 1981 to 1993, and then as the director of the Cleveland Museum of Art until 1999.

== Early life and education ==
Robert P. Bergman was born on May 17, 1945, in Bayonne, New Jersey, to Abe and Ethel Bergman. After receiving his bachelor's degree from Rutgers University, he studied medieval Italian art at Princeton University where he received a MFA and PhD. Through further studies of his specialties of medieval art and architecture, he became a Fulbright Scholar, a Guggenheim Fellow, and won a Rome Prize fellowship from the American Academy in Rome.

== Career ==
=== Academia ===
Bergman initially pursued an academic career in the arts from 1971 to 1981. He started his career at Lincoln University, in 1969, where he held the title of Visiting Instructor. From 1972 to 1976, he held the position of Assistant Professor of Art and Archaeology at Princeton University, and from 1976 to 1981 was Associate Professor of Fine Arts at Harvard University.

An enthusiast of museums, he ended his 16-year career in academia to eventually work at the Walters Art Gallery.

=== Museum directorship ===
Starting in 1981, he served as director of the Walters Art Gallery, and oversaw the renovation and 1988 reopening of the gallery's original building constructed in 1904, and the opening of an Asian art gallery in 1991. He directed the Walters Art Gallery until 1993, when he was chosen by the Cleveland Museum of Art (CMA) as its fifth and next director, where he would direct from 1993 until his death in 1999. Under his directorship, annual attendance to the CMA increased from 400,000 to the mid-600,000s. In addition to managing several major shows and thirty gallery renovations or reinstallations, he oversaw the acquisition of art encompassing all subject areas, including works by Annibale Carracci, Andy Warhol, and sixteenth-century Milanese armorer Pompeo della Cesa, as well as Constantinian jewelry and a 13th-century Pisan cross.

Bergman also extensively published and lectured, discussing subjects such as medieval art and architecture or the role of museums in modern society. At the CMA, he held annual lectures on historical monuments that attracted standing-room only audiences. Prior to his death, he was involved with various national and municipal organizations. He led the American Association of Museum Directors and the American Arts Alliance, an organization that lobbied on behalf of various art organizations, and also served as chairman of the Cleveland Cultural Coalition and on the board of the Greater Cleveland Growth Association. He was an adjunct professor of art at Case Western Reserve University.

== Personal life ==
Bergman married Marcelle Posnak. The couple had one daughter. Bergman died on May 6, 1999, at the University Hospitals in Cleveland, Ohio, due to hemophagocytic syndrome.
