= Royal Armoury of Madrid =

Museum in Madrid, Spain

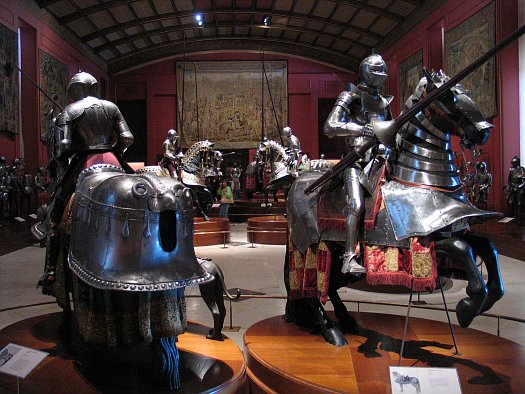
Royal Armory of Madrid

The Royal Armoury of Madrid or Real Armería de Madrid, is a collection that, among many other things, contains the personal arms of the Kings of Spain, and also houses military weapons, armours and diplomatic works of art like mixed tapestries, paintings and other works of art and trophies. Among the most notable parts of the collection are armor and full tools that Charles V, Holy Roman Emperor and Philip II used. It is considered, along with the Imperial Armory of Vienna, one of the best in the world.

The decision to grant preferential treatment to the Armory dates back at least to the death of Charles V, Holy Roman Emperor, which occurred on 21 September 1558.

== Location ==
The armory of the Charles V, Holy Roman Emperor, had come, mostly, from Brussels to Spain via the port of Laredo, in September 1556, from where it went to Valladolid. At his death his weapons were scattered between Valladolid, the Monastery of Yuste, and possibly the Alcázar of Madrid.

=== Former building ===
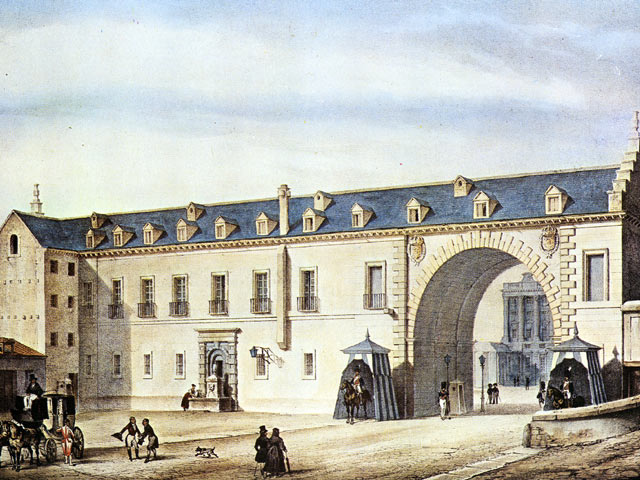
Antigua Real Armería de Felipe II.

This building that is currently known as "Antigua Real Armería de Felipe II" was chosen, apparently, in 1553, to provide the Alcázar of a new Stables. Its conception was probably due to Philip II himself, judging by a sketch he made that is preserved in the Archivo General de Simancas.

This former armoury was located in the complex of the Royal Stables of the Alcázar of the Habsburgs, built by the master builder Gaspar de Vega between 1556 and 1564 at the behest of King Philip II. When works were completed, the king commanded that the Armoury be moved to the wing of the Stables that was in front of the main facade of the Alcázar.

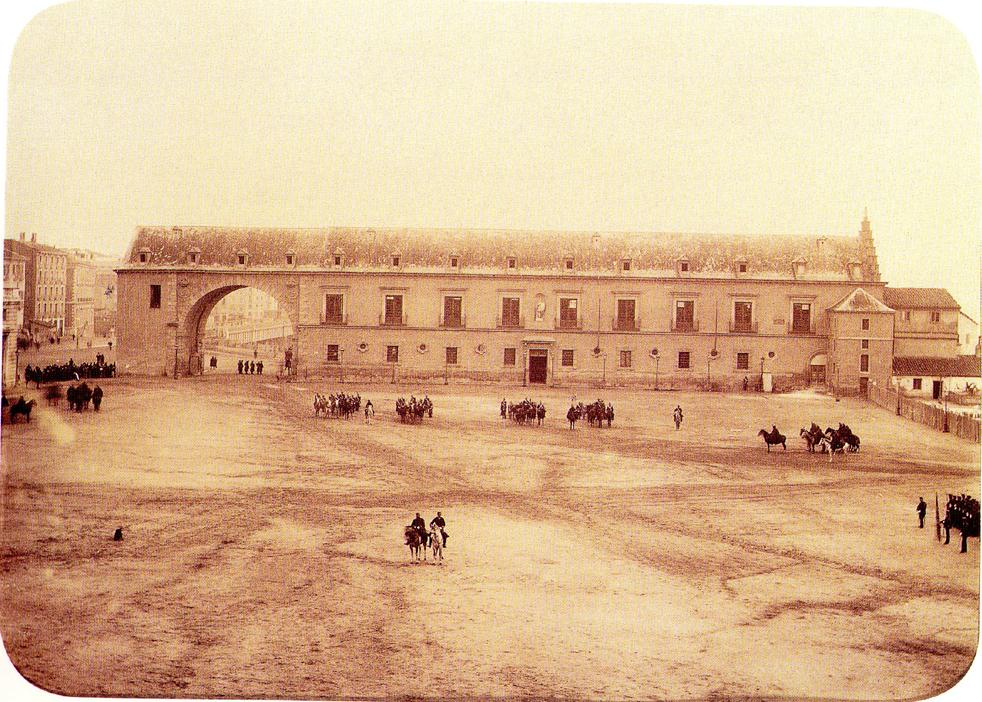
Back facade of the Antigua Real Armería de Felipe II (photo in 1884).

The new site was structured around a rectangular hall of 63 meters long by 10 meters wide, and consisted of a ground floor and main floor. Crowning the building was a ledge of stone on which stood the roof truss and slate roof, with stepped gables at both front ends. Downstairs were three naves, while the upper floor, housing the Armory, was completely open. The interior of the hall was completed in 1565. It was whitewashed and a large portion decorated with azulejos from Talavera de la Reina pottery by Juan Florez.

The most characteristic element of its structure was the called "Arc of the Armoury" that connected the Alcázar with the outside. The arc was built during the reign of Charles II of Habsburg.

=== Current location ===
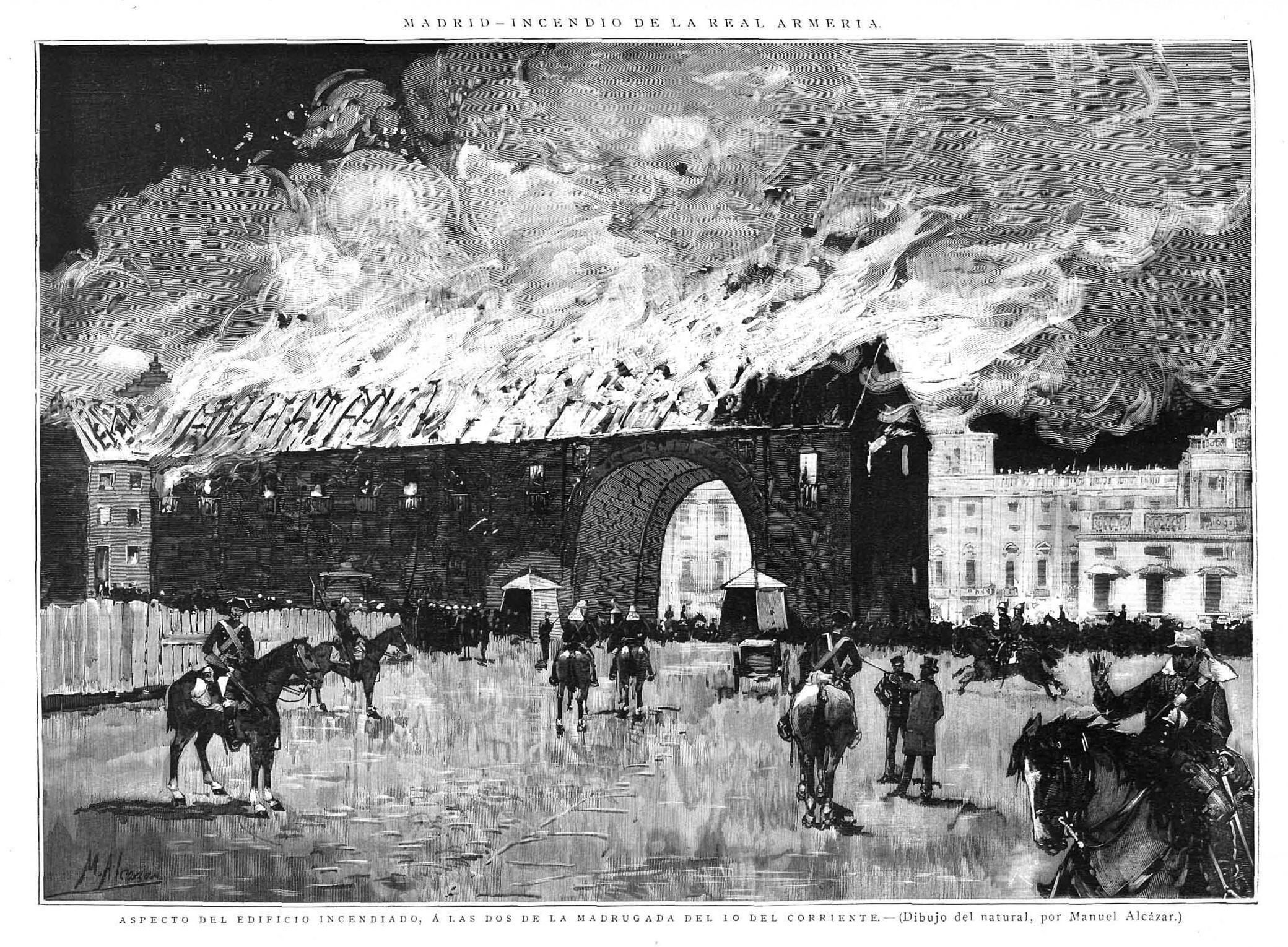
1884 fire.

In 1884 a fire partially destroyed the structure built by Philip II. Alfonso XII ordered no expense be spared in the construction of a new building which is its current headquarters. Alfonso's early death meant he did not see the culmination of his work, which was finally completed by the will of the Queen Maria Cristina. The main floor of the new building was conceived as a large room decorated with tapestries, weapons and outfits in which was installed the entire collection. The new facility was inaugurated in 1893.

The current Royal Armoury of Madrid is located on the ground floor of the Royal Palace of Madrid, and is considered, along with the Imperial Armoury of Vienna, one of the best in the world. It consists of pieces from as early as the 15th century. The collection highlights the tournament pieces made for Charles V and Philip II by the leading armourers of Milan and Augsburg. Among the most remarkable works are the full armour and weapons that Emperor Charles V used in the Battle of Mühlberg, and which was portrayed by Titian in his famous equestrian portrait housed at the Museo del Prado. The armoury retains some of the most important pieces of this art in Europe and the world, including several signed by Filippo Negroli, one of the most famous designers in the armourers' guild.

== Collections ==
The weapons were guarded in the former building in large "drawers" of wood, i.e. large closets like cloakrooms. The distribution of the weapons in the room was thought through thoroughly. Higher grade weapons were stored inside the drawers. Firearms, archery, and to a lesser extent, some knives and small, were placed over the windows. The remaining pole weapons occupied the front ends of the room and the drawers. The western headwall highlighted two small pieces of artillery and four sledges with fittings of its shots.

The criteria of distribution and management inside the drawers were more complex. The first criterion of distribution catered to the owners of the weapons. Those belonging to Charles V, Holy Roman Emperor occupied mainly the first eight drawers in the southern side, while those of Philip II were stored next to those of his father in the northern wall. According to the second criterion, certain drawers housed the set of armor, spines, trappings and clothing that constituted each of the harnesses of Charles V and Philip II. The third criterion, broader, responded to the types of objects. Thus each drawer kept only one type of weapon, dedicated for example to knives, or chain mail, or other objects with common features, duch as arms decorated in damascene. Other drawers guarded weapons of particular interest to the dynasty, such as the trophies of Mülhberg and Pavia, guns of legendary characters or some symbolic importance, the ceremonial sword of the Catholic Monarchs, the rapier sent by Pope Clement VII to Charles V, the armor sent to Philip II by the shogun Toyotomi Hideyoshi or the swords attributed to El Cid, to el Gran Capitán, to Roland and to Boabdil.

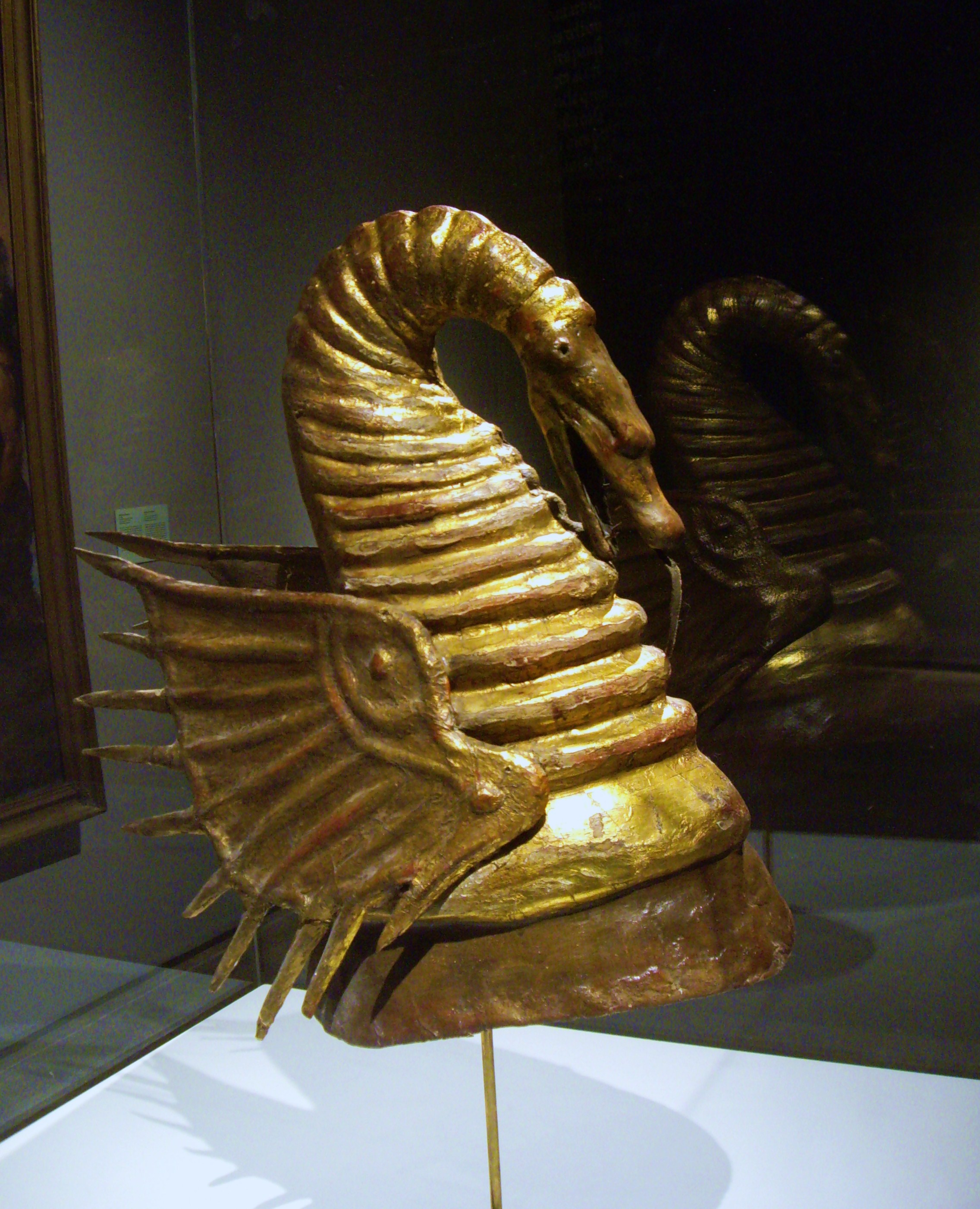
King's Martin of Aragon crest

The core of the current collection corresponds to the armory guarded by Philip II when he established the Court in Madrid, consisting of his personal armory, but especially that of his father, Charles V, Holy Roman Emperor, who in turn had retained weapons belonging to his father, Philip I of Castile and his grandparents, Ferdinand II of Aragon and Maximilian I, Holy Roman Emperor. Within this set stand the armor of Charles V, Holy Roman Emperor and Philip II as a set of most important and core on which is based the rest of the collection. Alongside are other significant sets of the formation of the current collection, despite the irregular increase of its funds from the 16th to the 19th century: among these are the medieval weapons from the Treasury of the Alcázar of Segovia; the firearms of Charles V and Philip II; the child armor of the Princes and Infantes of Spain; military trophies; and diplomatic and family gifts sent by the following persons: the Duke of Mantua to Charles V; the shogun Toyotomi Hideyoshi to Philip II; Charles Emmanuel I, Duke of Savoy and James I of England to Philip III; Infanta Isabel Clara Eugenia and Cardinal-Infante Ferdinand of Austria to Philip IV; or the Sultan of Turkey to Charles III among others. The last set of special importance in the collection are the firearms forged in Madrid for the venatoria activities of the Court, of great reputation throughout the continent.

The medieval and transition to Renaissance funds are a set of importance for its meaning, despite its number and diverse origins. One part was in the armory of Charles V, Holy Roman Emperor, who had inherited his father's weapons, of his grandparents and some of his contemporaries. A second set comes from the Royal Treasury of the Alcazar of Segovia, moved to the Armory of Madrid by Philip II. A third group consists of several purchases, donations and transfers of royal medals made between the reigns of Ferdinand VII to Alfonso XII. Highlights the depiction of the emblems of the kingdoms of Castile, León and Aragon, present in the acicates and the mantle of Ferdinand III of Castile, those coming from his burial in the Cathedral of Seville, and the crest of Drac Alat attributed to Martin of Aragon. Together with them stand the royal sword of the Catholic Monarchs, used as ceremonial sword in the Spanish Court until the 18th century.

The reign of the Catholic Monarchs and the weaponry of Late Middle Ages, is also represented by weapons from various sources that frame the activity in this period. Also preserved are contemporary war weapons to the Granada War, consisting of illustrative defensive pieces of the Spanish, Italian and German workshops; and two of the oldest portable fire weapons known in Spain, even debtors in some ways, of the archery that supersede with the time. Within this group it deserve special mention the helmets and the armor pieces associated with a peculiar prestigious peninsular production, whose workshops have not yet been identified, but are supposed are from Aragonese origin; The Nasrid sultanate of Granada is present through a small but important sample of its panoply, since are preserved an example of each of the three types of weapons of Granadan creation; one genet from the collection of Cardinal-Infante Ferdinand of Austria; one leather shield preserved in the armory of Charles V; and a dagger wing associated with a belt with pouch and a holster for a Quran, those latter captured at the Battle of Lucena to Muhammad XI (Boabdil), and those presented to Alfonso XIII by the Marquis of Viana as part of the Villaseca legacy.

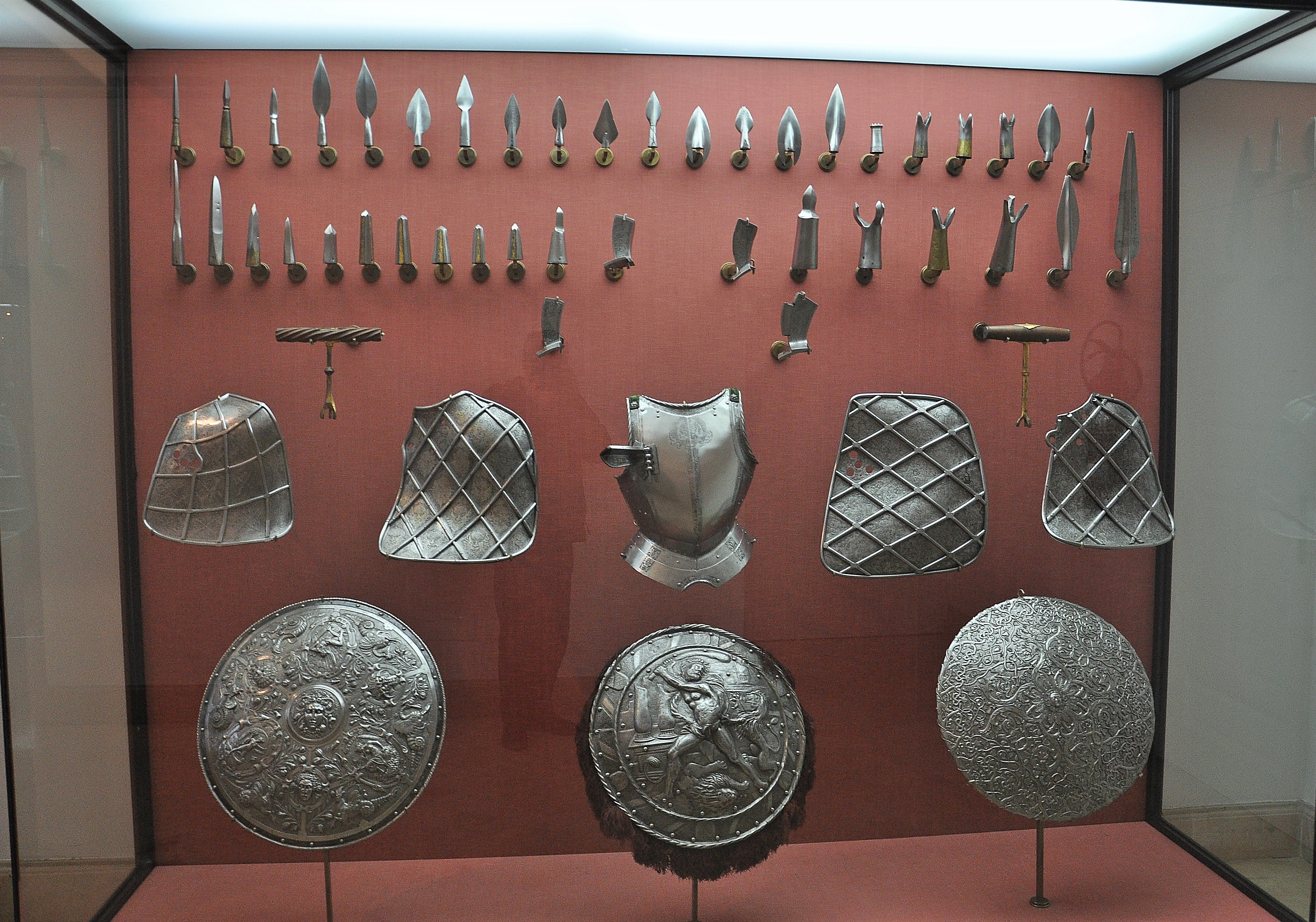
Sample of the collections

The collection retains weapons related with some of the facts and prominent figures of the reign of the Catholic Monarchs through their weapons, such as the sword of Gonzalo Fernández de Córdoba (el Gran Capitán), or the weapons of Maximilian I, Holy Roman Emperor, specifically a headpiece of horse, a coracina and two fences. The firsts allude to his power and dynasty by a decoration and heraldic and allegorical character that puts the imperial emblems. These weapons come from the collection of Charles V, Holy Roman Emperor where were also guarding the weapons of his father, Philip I of Castile, representative of the marriage alliances between the Catholic Monarchs and Maximilian. The armory of Philip I of Castile is currently divided between the Hofjagd und Rüstkammer (Kunsthistorisches Museum) of Vienna and the Royal Armory of Madrid, where are primarily the weapons used since his marriage with Joanna of Castile, among which a two hands sword with his personal motto, and helmets and testeras of Flemish, German and Italian origin; between these, two helmets by the Milanos workshop of Filippo Negroli and three armor that match only two examples in the Flemish and Spanish production period.

=== The Armouries of Charles V, Holy Roman Emperor and Philip II ===
The armouries of Charles V, Holy Roman Emperor and Philip II constitute the core of the collection, especially in regard to the imperial armory. Meanwhile, the weapons of Philip II can not be dissociated from those of his father, given the close relationship between the two, and by their German or Italian origin within the same chronological period. In fact, most of the armors of Philip II were forged when Charles V lived, coinciding at times in its development with those of the Emperor. The whole of the armors of Charles V and Philip II was forged between 1519 and 1560, during the Renaissance, during the time of splendor of the art of the armour.

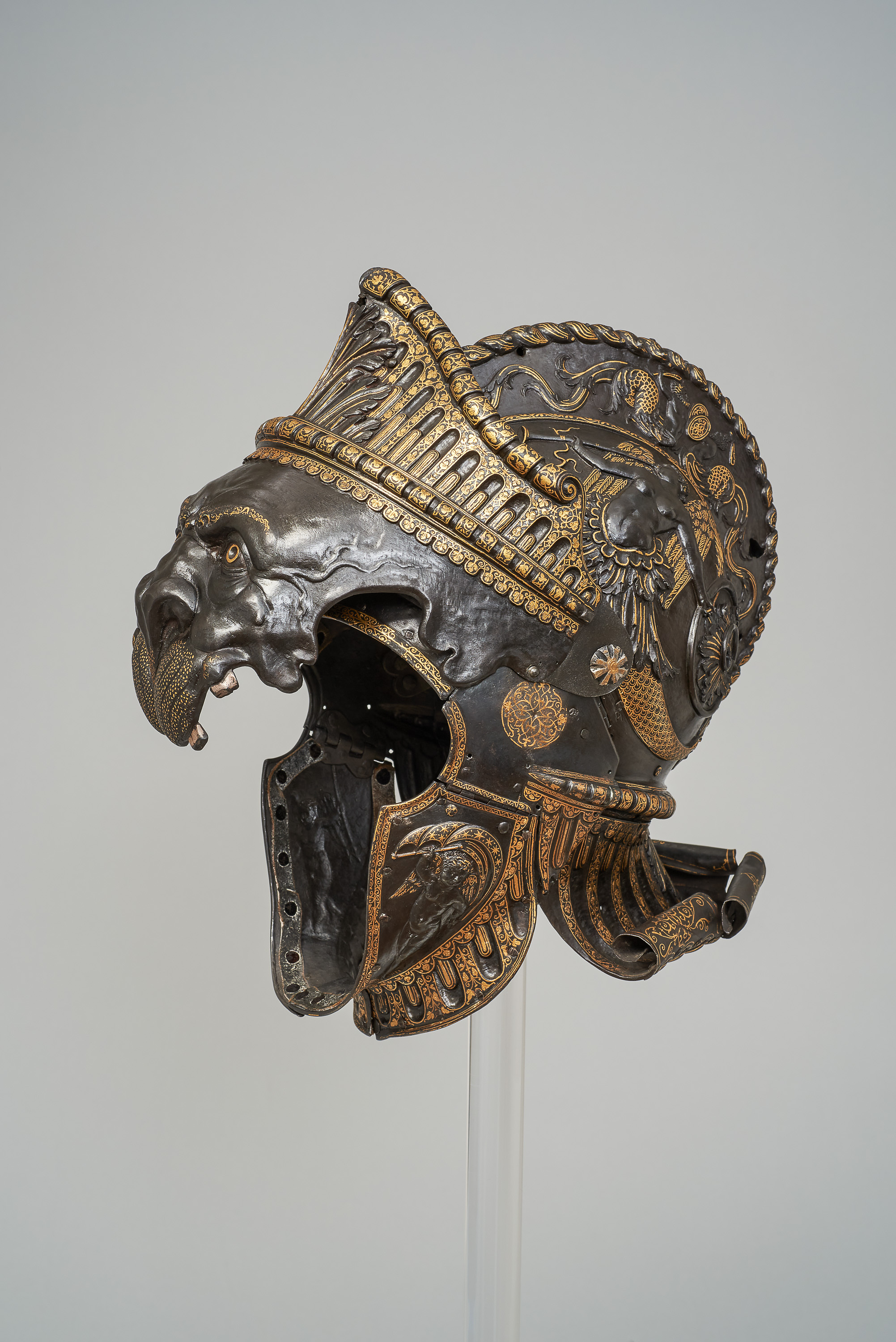
Charles V's Nemean Lion Parade Burgonet by Filippo Negroli

Essentially, is not a set of war weapons, but a collection of luxury weapons as a representation of power, intended to be used in the various events of the Court: fairs, tournaments, military parades, jousting, etc. Most of the armours of Charles V and Philip II were forged following the concept of fitting armor invented by Maximilian I, Holy Roman Emperor: consisted of a base armour provided with reinforcement parts or complement, decorated uniformly, so that the exchange of the different pieces that compose it, could lead to the formation of various figures intended to the combat on foot, to the fair and to the equestrian tournament, to the war in its different variants or to the parade. The Spanish Royal Collection retains much of these auxiliary pieces and a high number of fences or armors of horse, associated, in some cases, to such armors.

In this type of weapons is especially valued the constructive and technical wit, the formal design and the decoration, the latter rich in connotations of all being, from chivalry to the reflection of the ideas and themes of humanism through allegorical, religious, heraldic and / or dynastic, or recreating the classical tradition of the Roman times. The physical implementation of the decoration is done by techniques to show or enhance the beauty and richness of the pieces sculpted thanks to etched surfaces, light embossed, golden or silver surfaces, bluing, gold and silver damascened, etc. Therefore, throughout Europe the luxury weapons could only be forged and decorated in a limited number of highly specialized workshops. The most important were located, for historical and geographical reasons, in Germany and northern Italy. In the case of Charles V stand out the workshops of Kolman and Desiderius Helmschmid from Augsburg, and of Filippo Negroli and brothers from Milan. In the case of Philip II, Franz and Wolfgang Grosschedel from Landshut, Desiderius Helmschmid and Anton Peffenhauser from Augsburg. These armourers are given special preference, but both Charles V and Philip II possessed weapons coming from other high-level workshops, such as Mattheus Frawenbrys, Caremolo Mondrone, or Bartolomeo Campi, either because these are specific orders, or by being parts submitted by various personages related to the Spanish Court.

== Bibliography ==
- Marchesi, José María (1849). Catálogo de la Real Armería, mandado formar por S.M.... Madrid: Aguado. https://books.google.com/books?id=_G6ynFwGCMoC
- Museo Nacional del Prado (2012). «La Real Armería de Madrid».
