= Pompeo della Cesa =

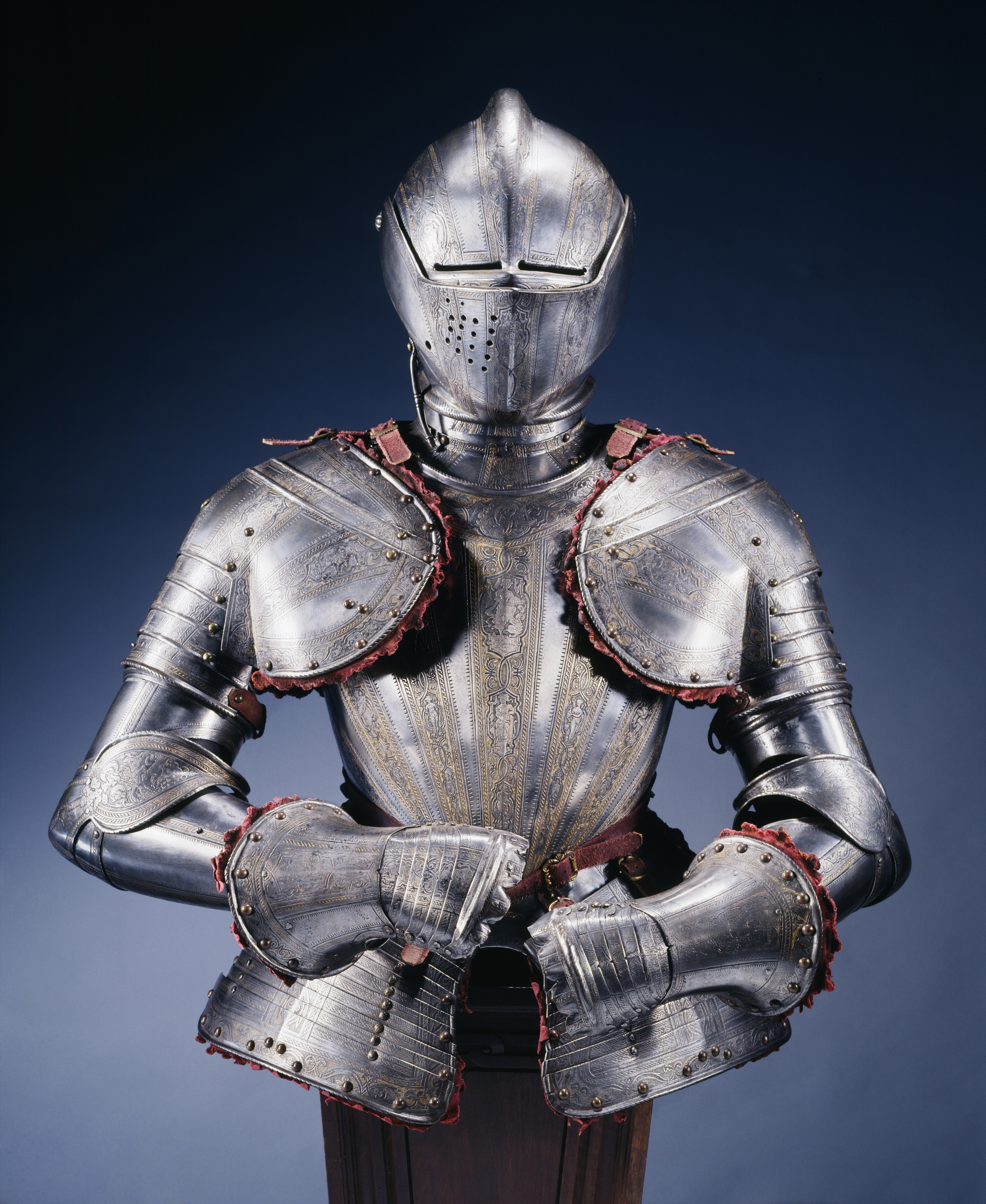
Half-armor for the foot tournament by Pompeo della Cesa, 1585, Cleveland Museum of Art

Pompeo della Cesa (1537–1610) was an Italian Renaissance armourer from Milan. He crafted numerous armours and interchangeable armour parts for high-ranking clients (such as the House of Farnese and House of Savoy, particularly Philip II of Spain and duke Alessandro Farnese). Della Cesa signed his craft as "Pompeo". He probably headed a sizeable workshop, also being a contractor jointly with other shops to manage particularly large commissions. His works are preserved in several museums, such as Met Museum and Art Institute of Chicago.

== See also ==
- Filippo Negroli
