= Bill Koch (American football) =

American football coach

Coaching career (HC unless noted)
- 1953–1964: Concordia Lutheran HS (IN)
- 1965–1974: Valparaiso (OC)
- 1975–1976: Valparaiso (DC)
- 1977–1988: Valparaiso

Head coaching record
- Overall: 43–71–3 (college)

Bill Koch is an American former football coach. He was the head football coach at Valparaiso University for 12 seasons, from 1977 until 1988, compiling a record at 43–71–3. At Valparaiso Koch also worked as an assistant basketball coach.

== Head coaching record ==
=== College ===
| Year | Team | Overall | Conference | Standing | Bowl/playoffs |
|---|---|---|---|---|---|
Valparaiso Crusaders (Indiana Collegiate Conference) (1977)
| 1977 | Valparaiso | 3–6–1 | 1–2–1 | 4th | |
Valparaiso Crusaders (Heartland Collegiate Conference) (1978–1988)
| 1978 | Valparaiso | 5–4 | 3–2 | T–2nd | |
| 1979 | Valparaiso | 5–4 | 2–3 | 4th | |
| 1980 | Valparaiso | 4–5–1 | 1–5–1 | 8th | |
| 1981 | Valparaiso | 1–9 | 1–6 | T–7th | |
| 1982 | Valparaiso | 3–7 | 1–6 | T–7th | |
| 1983 | Valparaiso | 4–6 | 2–4 | T–4th | |
| 1984 | Valparaiso | 6–4 | 2–4 | 5th | |
| 1985 | Valparaiso | 6–4 | 2–4 | 5th | |
| 1986 | Valparaiso | 3–7 | 3–3 | T–3rd | |
| 1987 | Valparaiso | 3–6 | 2–3 | 4th | |
| 1988 | Valparaiso | 0–9–1 | 0–4 | 5th | |
| Valparaiso: | | 43–71–3 | 19–46–2 | | |
| Total: | | 43–71–3 | | | |
