= Elwood Jr/Sr High School =

Location
- 1137 North 19th Street; Elwood, Indiana 46036; United States; 40°17′23″N 85°50′07″W

Information
- Type: Public high school
- School district: Elwood Community School Corporation
- Superintendent: Troy Friedersdorf
- Principal: Ethan Evans
- Teaching staff: 51.25 (FTE basis)
- Grades: 7-12
- Enrollment: 650 (2024-2025)
- Student to teacher ratio: 12.68
- Colors: Red and Royal blue
- Athletics conference: Central Indiana
- Nickname: Panthers
- Rivals: Frankton, Alexandria-Monroe, Tipton
- Website: www.elwood.k12.in.us

Elwood Jr/Sr High School is a public high school located in Elwood, Indiana.

== Demographics ==
The demographic breakdown of the 658 students enrolled in the 2014–2015 school year was:

- Male - 49.5%
- Female - 50.5%
- Native American/Alaskan - 0.0%
- Asian/Pacific islanders - 0.3%
- Black - 0.8%
- Hispanic - 5.9%
- White - 90.3%
- Multiracial - 2.7%

63.3% of the students were eligible for free or reduced price lunch, making this a Title I school.

== Athletics ==
The Elwood Panthers compete in the Central Indiana Conference. The school colors are red and royal blue. The following IHSAA sanctioned sports are offered:

- Basketball (boys and girls)
- Baseball (boys)
- Cross Country (boys and girls)
- Football (boys)
- Golf (boys and girls)
- Softball (girls)
- Swimming (boys and girls)
- Tennis (boys and girls)
- Track (boys/girls/unified)
- Volleyball (girls)
- Wrestling (boys and girls)

== See also ==
- List of high schools in Indiana
