= 1962 Ole Miss Rebels football team =

American college football season

1962 Ole Miss Rebels football
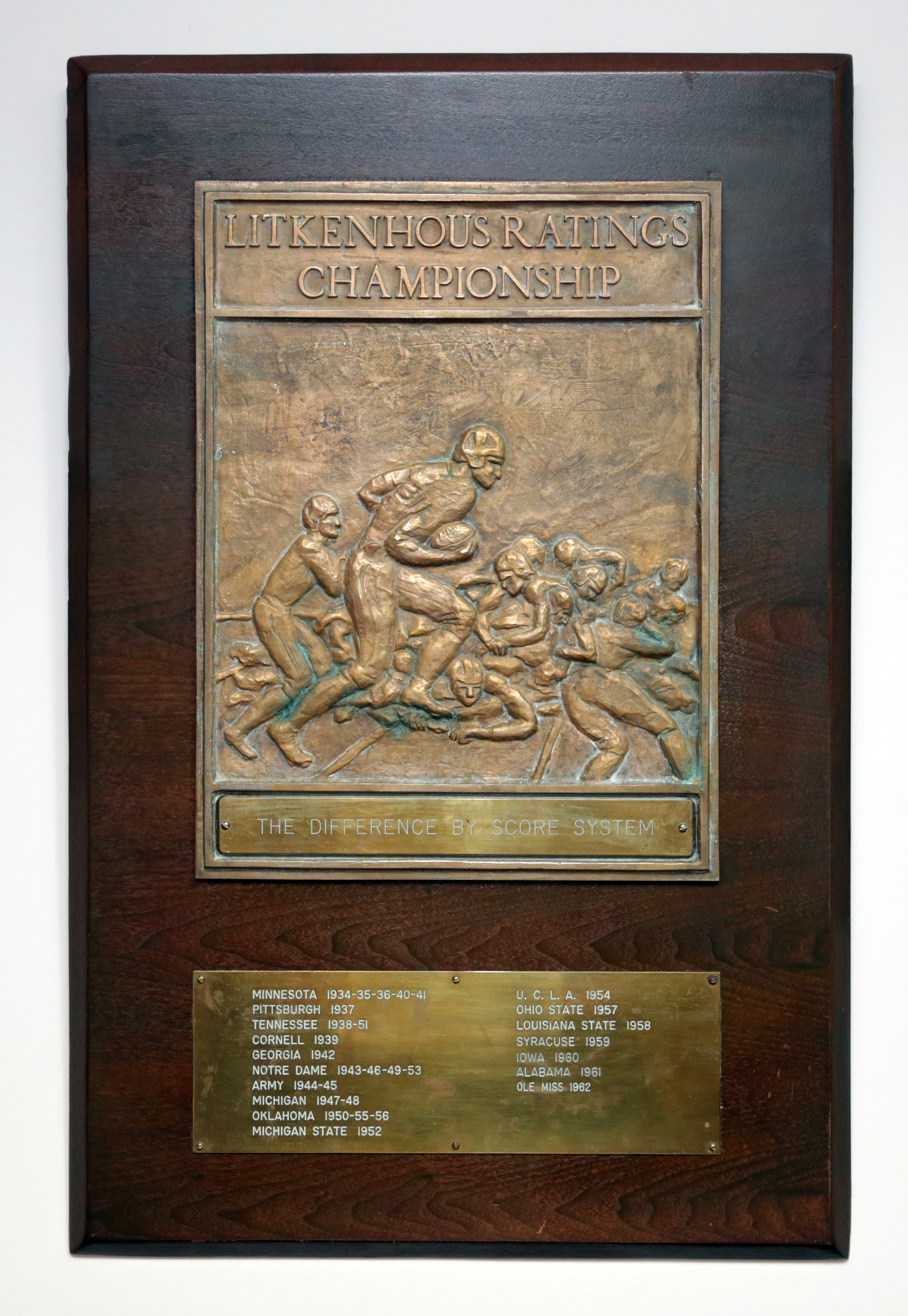

National Champion (Billingsley, Litkenhous, Sagarin) Sugar Bowl champion SEC champion

Sugar Bowl, W 17–13 vs. Arkansas
- Conference: Southeastern Conference

Ranking
- Coaches: No. 3
- AP: No. 3
- Record: 10–0 (6–0 SEC)
- Head coach: Johnny Vaught (16th season)
- Home stadium: Hemingway Stadium; Mississippi Memorial Stadium

1962 Southeastern Conference football standings
	Conf.					Overall
Team	W		L		T	W		L		T
No. 3 Ole Miss $	6	–	0	–	0	10	–	0	–	0
No. 5 Alabama	6	–	1	–	0	10	–	1	–	0
No. 7 LSU	5	–	1	–	0	9	–	1	–	1
Georgia Tech	5	–	2	–	0	7	–	3	–	1
Florida	4	–	2	–	0	7	–	4	–	0
Auburn	4	–	3	–	0	6	–	3	–	1
Georgia	2	–	3	–	1	3	–	4	–	3
Kentucky	2	–	3	–	1	3	–	5	–	2
Mississippi State	2	–	5	–	0	3	–	6	–	0
Tennessee	2	–	6	–	0	4	–	6	–	0
Vanderbilt	1	–	6	–	0	1	–	9	–	0
Tulane	0	–	7	–	0	0	–	10	–	0
$ – Conference champion; Rankings from AP Poll

The 1962 Ole Miss Rebels football team was an American football team that represented the University of Mississippi in the Southeastern Conference (SEC) during the 1962 NCAA University Division football season. In their 16th year under head coach Johnny Vaught, the Rebels compiled a perfect 10–0 record, outscored opponents by a total of 247 to 53, won the SEC championship, and defeated Arkansas in the 1963 Sugar Bowl. To date, it is the only undefeated and untied season in Ole Miss football history.

Mississippi finished No. 1 in the season's final Litkenhous Ratings and was awarded the Litkenhous Ratings Championship trophy. This team was apparently the last Litkenhous champion to be awarded the traveling trophy, as the plaque remains at Ole Miss today.

The team ranked No. 3 in the final AP and UPI coaches polls released in December 1962. USC was selected as the national champion by both the AP and UPI. In later retrospective analyses, Ole Miss was recognized as the 1962 national champion by the Billingsley Report and Sagarin Ratings. In September 2012, Ole Miss athletic director Ross Bjork announced that the 1962 team would be receiving national championship rings to honor their accomplishments.

Ole Miss tackle Jim Dunaway was a consensus first-team player on the 1962 All-America college football team. Quarterback Glynn Griffing was also selected as a first-team All-American by the Football Writers Association of America. The team's statistical leaders included Griffing with 882 passing yards and 278 rushing yards and Lou Guy with 295 receiving yards and 42 points scored.

The Rebels' undefeated season was set against the backdrop of the civil rights movement taking place on their own campus as James Meredith, aided by the United States government, was attempting to be the first African American student to enroll at the university. In 2012, ESPN aired a documentary on the team, Ghosts of Ole Miss, as part of its 30 for 30 series.

== Schedule ==
Date	Opponent	Rank	Site	Result	Attendance	Source
September 22	at Memphis State*	No. 6	Crump Stadium; Memphis, TN (rivalry)	W 21–7	30,100–30,111	
September 29	Kentucky	No. 7	Mississippi Veterans Memorial Stadium; Jackson, MS	W 14–0	42,000	
October 6	Houston*	No. 7	Mississippi Veterans Memorial Stadium; Jackson, MS	W 40–7	18,000	
October 20	Tulane	No. 5	Mississippi Veterans Memorial Stadium; Jackson, MS (rivalry)	W 21–0	23,000	
October 27	vs. Vanderbilt	No. 7	Crump Stadium; Memphis, TN (rivalry)	W 35–0	16,262	
November 3	at No. 4 LSU	No. 6	Tiger Stadium; Baton Rouge, LA (rivalry)	W 15–7	67,500	
November 10	Chattanooga*	No. 4	Hemingway Stadium; Oxford, MS	W 52–7	9,200	
November 17	at Tennessee	No. 3	Neyland Stadium; Knoxville, TN (rivalry)	W 19–6	37,166	
December 1	Mississippi State	No. 3	Hemingway Stadium; Oxford, MS (Egg Bowl)	W 13–6	30,000	
January 1, 1963	vs. No. 6 Arkansas*	No. 3	Tulane Stadium; New Orleans, LA (Sugar Bowl) (rivalry)	W 17–13	82,900	
*Non-conference game; Rankings from AP Poll released prior to the game

== Roster ==
- Allen Brown, end
- Willis Dabbs, end
- Don Dickson, line
- Kenny Dill, line
- Jim Dunaway, tackle
- Perry Lee Dunn, Jr., fullback
- Glynn Griffing, quarterback
- Lou Guy, back
- Whaley Hall, line
- Conrad Hitchler, end
- Fred Kimbrell, line
- Chuck Morris, back
- Buck Randall, back
- Frank Roberts, back
- James Roberts, line
- Richard Ross, line
- Jim Weatherly, quarterback

== Awards ==
- SEC Coach of the Year: Johnny Vaught
- 1962 All-America college football team

- Tackle Jim Dunaway, consensus first-team All-American
- Quarterback Glynn Griffing, first-team All-America pick by Football Writers Association of America (FWAA)

- 1962 All-SEC football team

- Quarterback Glynn Griffing (AP-1, UPI-1)
- Halfback Louis Guy (UPI-3)
- Tackle Jim Dunaway (UPI-1)
- Guard Don Dickson (AP-1, UPI-1)
