= Larry Stallings =

American football player (born 1941)

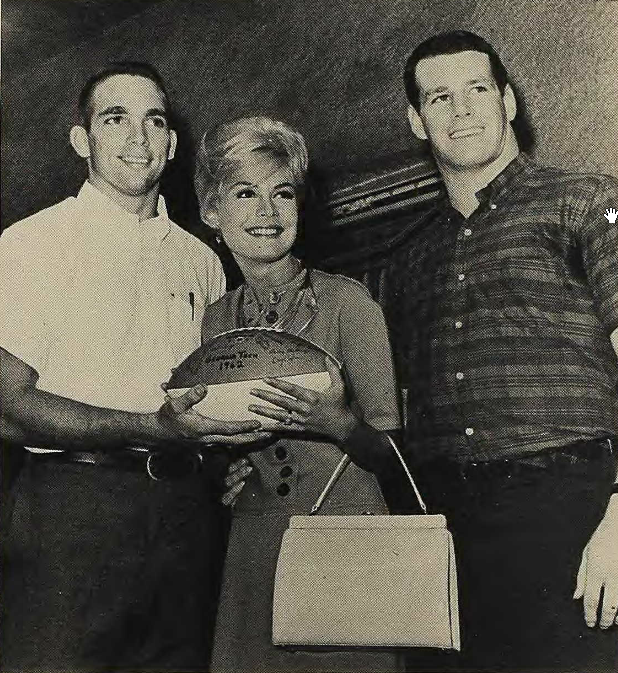
- Stallings (right) and teammate present football to Miss Sandra Dee, 1962

No. 67
- Position: Linebacker

Personal information
- Born: December 11, 1941 (age 84); Evansville, Indiana, U.S.
- Listed height: 6 ft 1 in (1.85 m)
- Listed weight: 230 lb (104 kg)

Career information
- High school: Reitz Memorial (Evansville, Indiana)
- College: Georgia Tech
- NFL draft: 1963: 18th round, 241st overall pick
- AFL draft: 1963: 9th round, 68th overall pick

Career history
- St. Louis Cardinals (1963–1976)

Awards and highlights
- Pro Bowl (1970)

Career NFL statistics
- Interceptions: 9
- Interception yards: 76
- Fumble recoveries: 13
- Sacks: 27.5
- Defensive touchdowns: 3
- Stats at Pro Football Reference

Larry Joseph Stallings (born December 11, 1941) is an American former professional football player who was a linebacker in the National Football League (NFL) for 14 seasons with the St. Louis Cardinals and was a once Pro Bowler. He played college football for the Georgia Tech Yellow Jackets.

== Early life ==
Stallings was born on December 11, 1941, in Evansville, Indiana, where he attended Reitz Memorial High School. He played tackle on the school's football team, and was team captain his senior year (1958) when Memorial went undefeated. He also played on the basketball team at Memorial, as a 6 ft 1 in (1.85 m) 185 pound (83.9 kg) forward. He earned All-City and All-State mention in football as a senior.

== College ==
Stallings was recruited to play football at, among other schools, the University of Notre Dame, Tulane University, Vanderbilt University, the University of Kentucky, Xavier University and Indiana University, but chose to attend the Georgia institute of Technology (Georgia Tech), as his father wanted Stallings to have an engineering degree from Georgia Tech. Stallings graduated in 1963 with a degree in civil engineering. He was also a star on the football team.

Stallings played three years of varsity football at tackle for Georgia Tech. During his sophomore year, he blocked a kick against Rice University and fell on the ball for a touchdown (breaking his nose in the process), in a 16–13 win for Georgia Tech. After continued good play, he became a starting tackle later that year. It has also been reported that Stallings's teammate Billy Shaw blocked the kick, and Stallings fell on it for the touchdown. Shaw went on to a Hall of Fame career with the Buffalo Bills.

Stallings continued as a starter in his junior year (1961), with head coach Bobby Dodd calling his play at tackle outstanding. The team went 7–4, and lost in the Gator Bowl to Penn State, 30–15. Stallings was chosen by his coaches and teammates as an alternate captain or co-captain for the 1962 season. In 1962, as a senior, Stallings was named third-team All-Southeastern Conference by the Associated Press (AP), at tackle.

Georgia Tech had a 7–3–1 record in 1962, and was ranked as high as No. 5 in the AP college poll during the season. Georgia Tech played in the 1962 Bluebonnet Bowl, losing to the University of Missouri, 14–10, on December 22, 1962. Missouri's star running back Johnny Roland praised Stallings play at tackle in the game. Roland would become Stallings' NFL teammate in St. Louis from 1966 to 1972.

Stallings was selected to play in the Senior Bowl in early January 1963, where he had a strong game on defense. Stallings also got married in December 1962, between his final two college games. He was named to the All Scholastic team at Georgia Tech in 1962.

== Professional football ==
The St. Louis Cardinals selected Stallings in the 18th round of the 1963 NFL draft, 241st overall. He was selected in the 9th round of the 1963 American Football League (AFL) draft by the Buffalo Bills, 68th overall. Stallings chose the Cardinals.

The Cardinals made Stallings a starting linebacker in the 1963 season, even though he had never played that position before. After starting 12 games in 1963 and playing in all 14, Stallings had knee issues in 1964, and played in only eight games (starting seven). He did have the first two interceptions of his career in 1964. In 1965, he had knee surgery and played in only seven games (all starts). He had his first NFL career touchdown on a fumble recovery against Norm Snead and the Philadelphia Eagles in late November 1965.

Stallings started all 14 games in 1966. In an October 2, 1966 game against the Philadelphia Eagles, he had three quarterback sacks on Snead–one causing a fumble–and an interception. Stallings was named Associated Press Defensive Player of the Week for his accomplishments in the game. From 1966 to 1976, Stallings was the Cardinals starting left linebacker, missing only two games in 11 years, while starting in 149 games.

Stallings was selected as the Cardinals' Most Valuable Player after the 1969 season. He was selected to play in the Pro Bowl in 1970, his first and only time on that team. He had a career high four sacks that season, two fumble recoveries and one interception. United Press International (UPI) named him first-team All-National Football Conference at linebacker that season.

The Cardinals failed to make the playoffs for the first eleven years of Stallings' career. In 1974, the Cardinals were 10–4 and won the NFC East Division, but lost to the Minnesota Vikings in the divisional round of the 1974 playoffs. The Cardinals won the East Division again in 1975, with an 11–3 record; losing to the Los Angeles Rams 35–23 in the divisional round of the 1975 playoffs, though Stallings forced a fumble from Lawrence McCutcheon in the game.

Stallings retired after the 1976 season, having played all of his 14 NFL seasons with the Cardinals. He played in 181 games, starting 175. He had nine interceptions, 13 fumble recoveries and 27.5 sacks. Stallings scored three touchdowns in his NFL career.

== Broadcaster ==
After retirement he was hired by St. Louis radio station KMOX to host an hour-long Cardinals' pre-game show.

== Personal life ==
During the off-seasons, Stallings worked as a structural engineer at Laclede Steel Company in St. Louis. He also founded his own company, Mac-Fab Products, that manufactured corrugated metal flooring and roof decking. He not only ran the company during the off-season, but worked there every day during his last four or five football seasons. In 1967 and 1968, he served as a 1st lieutenant in the U.S. Army, but this did not prevent him from playing for the Cardinals.
