= 1963 Sugar Bowl =

American college football game

- 29th Sugar Bowl
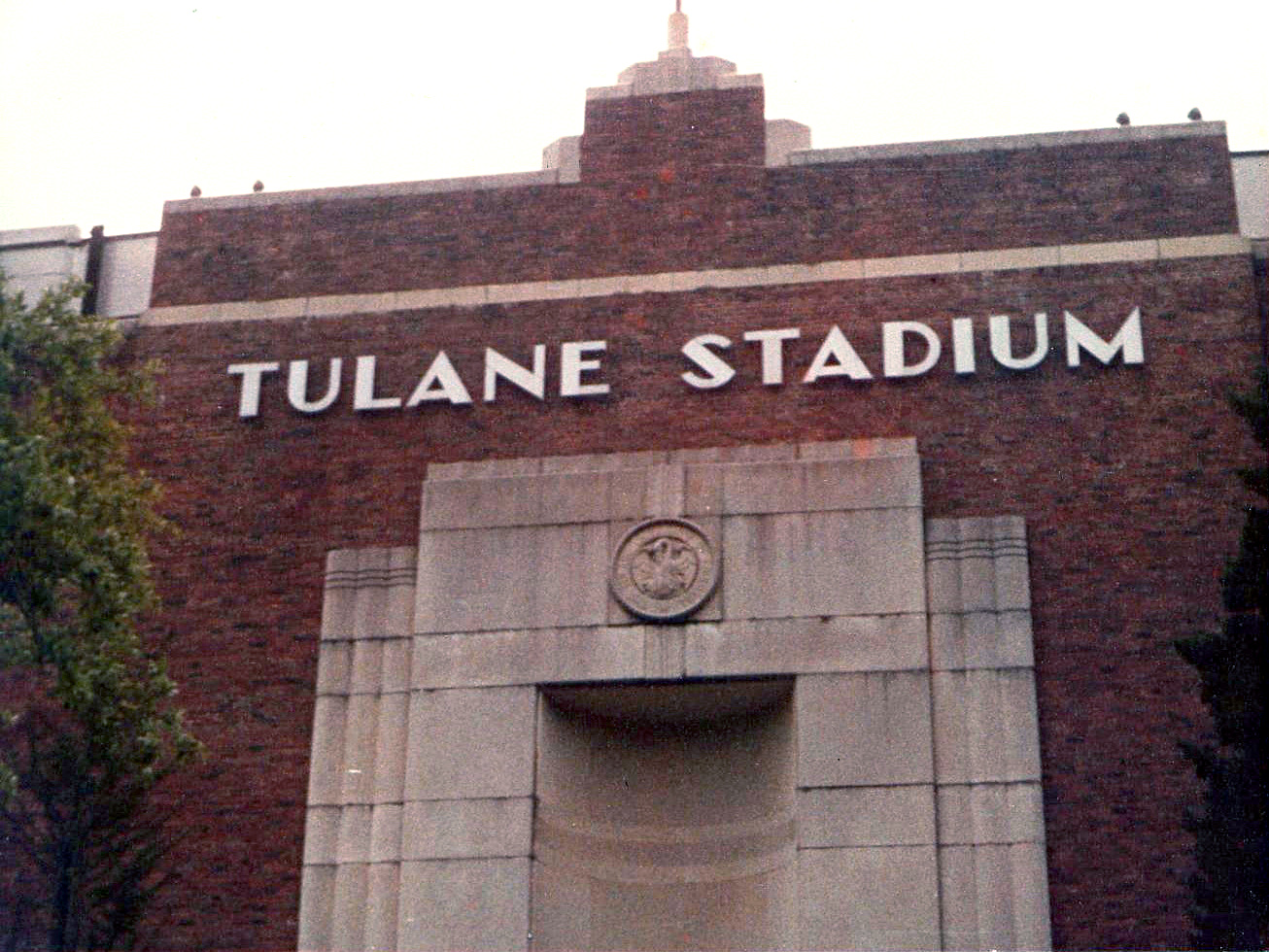
- Tulane Stadium in New Orleans, Louisiana, hosted the Sugar Bowl.
Ole Miss Rebels	Arkansas Razorbacks
(9–0)	(9–1)
SEC	SWC
17	13
Head coach: Johnny Vaught	Head coach: Frank Broyles
AP / Coaches; 3 / 3	AP / Coaches; 6 / 6
	1	2	3	4	Total
Ole Miss	0	10	7	0	17
Arkansas	0	3	10	0	13
- Date: January 1, 1963
- Season: 1962
- Stadium: Tulane Stadium
- Location: New Orleans, Louisiana
- MVP: Glynn Griffing
- Referee: Charles W. Bowen (SEC) (split crew between SEC & SWC)
- Attendance: 82,096

United States TV coverage
- Network: NBC

The 1963 Sugar Bowl featured the 3rd ranked Ole Miss Rebels, and the 6th ranked Arkansas Razorbacks. The New Year’s Day game was broadcast on NBC, with play-by-play commentary by Bob Wolff and color commentary by Aldo “Buff” Donelli.

== Game summary ==
Ole Miss took the early 3–0 lead in the second quarter, after a 30-yard Irwin field goal. Arkansas answered with a 30-yard field goal from Tom McKnelly, tying the game at 3-3. Quarterback Glynn Griffing threw a 33-yard touchdown pass to Louis Guy, giving Ole Miss a 10–3 lead at halftime.

In the third quarter, Razorback quarterback Billy Moore, who was eventually knocked out of the game by Ole Miss' Buck Randall, found Jesse Branch for a 5-yard touchdown pass that tied the game at 10. Glynn Griffin scored on a 1-yard touchdown run giving Ole Miss a 17–10 lead. A 22-yard Tom McKnelly field goal in the fourth quarter, pulled the Razorbacks to 17–13, but Ole Miss held on for the win. Glynn Griffin was named Sugar Bowl MVP.

Scoring summary

Quarter	Time	Drive			Team	Scoring information	Score	
Quarter	Time	Plays	Yards	TOP	Team	Scoring information	ARK	UM
2			80		UM	30-yard field goal by Irwin	0	3
2			82		ARK	30-yard field goal by Tom McKnelly	3	3
2			67		UM	Louis Guy 33-yard touchdown reception from Glynn Griffing, Irwin kick good	3	10
3			15		ARK	Jesse Branch 5-yard touchdown reception from Billy Moore, Tom McKnelly kick good	10	10
3			80		UM	Glynn Griffing 1-yard touchdown run, Irwin kick good	10	17
3			59		ARK	22-yard field goal by Tom McKnelly	13	17
"TOP" = time of possession. For other American football terms, see Glossary of American football.							13	17

== See also ==
- Arkansas–Ole Miss football rivalry
