= Johnny Griffith (coach) =

American football player and coach (1924–2003)

Biographical details
- Born: May 27, 1924; Crawfordville, Georgia, U.S.
- Died: April 28, 2003 (aged 78); Duluth, Georgia, U.S.

Playing career
- 1946: Georgia
- 1947: South Georgia
- Position: Halfback

Coaching career (HC unless noted)
- 1949: South Georgia (assistant)
- 1950–1953: South Georgia
- 1954: Georgia (assistant freshmen)
- 1955: Furman (backfield)
- 1956–1960: Georgia (assistant)
- 1961–1963: Georgia
- 1964–1966: Georgia Tech (assistant)

Head coaching record
- Overall: 10–16–4 (college); 32–6 (junior college)

Accomplishments and honors

Awards
- Georgia Sports Hall of Fame (1997)

Johnny Griffith (May 27, 1924 – April 28, 2003) was an American college football player and coach. He served as the head football coach at South Georgia College (1950–1954) and the University of Georgia (1961–1963).

== Early life and playing career ==
Griffith was born in Crawfordville, Georgia, and played high school football at Boys High School in Atlanta. He lettered at the University of Georgia in 1946 and was on the Bulldogs' national championship team. He also played junior college football at South Georgia College. Griffith graduated from Georgia in 1950.

== Coaching career ==
Griffith's coaching career began at the junior college level at South Georgia College. He was an assistant there in 1949 before becoming the head coach in 1950. In four years as the head football coach at South Georgia College, Griffith compiled a 32–6 record and took his team to four bowl appearances. Griffith was an assistant freshman coach at Georgia in 1954 while pursuing a master's degree. In 1955, he was hired as backfield coach at Furman University under newly hired head football coach Homer Hobbs.

Griffith returned to Georgia as an assistant in 1956. He succeeded Wally Butts as head coach in 1961. Except for a Southeastern Conference championship in 1959, the Georgia Bulldogs struggled in the last few years under Butts. Things did not get any better under Griffith and he was only able to compile a 10–16–4 record during his three-year term as head coach. While there were few successes during this time as head coach, he did have two big victories, a 30–21 upset win over Auburn in 1962 and a 31–14 win over the heavily favored Miami Hurricanes in 1963. Griffith was replaced after the 1963 season by Vince Dooley.

While coaching at Georgia, Griffith became embroiled in the controversy created when the Saturday Evening Post ran an article alleging that Wally Butts and Bear Bryant had conspired to fix games. The focus of the Post story was Georgia's 35–0 loss to Alabama. Griffith was quoted in the article as "bitterly" saying, "I never had a chance, did I" after the game. Butts sued the Post and Butts, Griffith and Bear Bryant all testified. Griffith denied that he made the statement attributed to him and otherwise called the facts of the Post story into question. Butts and Bryant also vehemently denied the truth of the story. Butts eventually won the case.

After Georgia, Griffith did some assistant coaching at Georgia Tech under Bobby Dodd, coaching quarterback Kim King, among others. He also became a key figure in the development of the Georgia Sports Hall of Fame, and was inducted into the Hall in 1997 as a contributor.

Griffith later went into sales, and was the president of a rock and mineral company. He died on April 28, 2003, at Joan Glancy Hospital in Duluth, Georgia.

== Head coaching record ==
=== College ===
Year	Team	Overall	Conference	Standing	Bowl/playoffs
Georgia Bulldogs (Southeastern Conference) (1961–1963)
1961	Georgia	3–7	2–5	9th	
1962	Georgia	3–4–3	2–3–1	T–7th	
1963	Georgia	4–5–1	2–4	9th	
Georgia:		10–16–4	6–12–1		
Total:		10–16–4			
