= 1962 Florida Gators football team =

American college football season

1962 Florida Gators football

Gator Bowl champion

Gator Bowl, W 17–7 vs. Penn State
- Conference: Southeastern Conference
- Record: 7–4 (4–2 SEC)
- Head coach: Ray Graves (3rd season)
- Offensive coordinator: Pepper Rodgers (3rd season)
- Home stadium: Florida Field

1962 Southeastern Conference football standings
| | Conf. | | | | | Overall |
| Team | W | | L | | T | W | | L | | T |
|---|---|---|---|---|---|---|---|---|---|---|
| No. 3 Ole Miss $ | 6 | – | 0 | – | 0 | 10 | – | 0 | – | 0 |
| No. 5 Alabama | 6 | – | 1 | – | 0 | 10 | – | 1 | – | 0 |
| No. 7 LSU | 5 | – | 1 | – | 0 | 9 | – | 1 | – | 1 |
| Georgia Tech | 5 | – | 2 | – | 0 | 7 | – | 3 | – | 1 |
| Florida | 4 | – | 2 | – | 0 | 7 | – | 4 | – | 0 |
| Auburn | 4 | – | 3 | – | 0 | 6 | – | 3 | – | 1 |
| Georgia | 2 | – | 3 | – | 1 | 3 | – | 4 | – | 3 |
| Kentucky | 2 | – | 3 | – | 1 | 3 | – | 5 | – | 2 |
| Mississippi State | 2 | – | 5 | – | 0 | 3 | – | 6 | – | 0 |
| Tennessee | 2 | – | 6 | – | 0 | 4 | – | 6 | – | 0 |
| Vanderbilt | 1 | – | 6 | – | 0 | 1 | – | 9 | – | 0 |
| Tulane | 0 | – | 7 | – | 0 | 0 | – | 10 | – | 0 |
$ – Conference champion; Rankings from AP Poll

The 1962 Florida Gators football team represented the University of Florida during the 1962 NCAA University Division football season. The season was the third of Ray Graves' ten seasons as the head coach of the Florida Gators football team. Graves' 1962 Florida Gators posted a 7–4 overall record and a 4–2 record in the Southeastern Conference (SEC), placing fifth in twelve-team SEC. The Gators won the Gator Bowl again in 1962, upsetting ninth-ranked Penn State. They wore the Confederate Battle Flag on the side of their helmets to pump up the southern team facing a favored northern school.

== Schedule ==
| Date | Opponent | Site | TV | Result | Attendance | Source |
|---|---|---|---|---|---|---|
| September 22 | at Mississippi State | Mississippi Veterans Memorial Stadium; Jackson, MS | | W 19–9 | 32,000 | |
| September 29 | No. 8 Georgia Tech | Florida Field; Gainesville, FL | | L 0–17 | 46,000 | |
| October 6 | vs. Duke* | Gator Bowl Stadium; Jacksonville, FL | | L 21–28 | 30,000 | |
| October 13 | Texas A&M* | Florida Field; Gainesville, FL | | W 42–6 | 33,000 | |
| October 20 | Vanderbilt^{†} | Florida Field; Gainesville, FL | | W 42–7 | 42,000 | |
| October 27 | at No. 6 LSU | Tiger Stadium; Baton Rouge, LA (rivalry) | | L 0–23 | 67,000 | |
| November 3 | No. 10 Auburn | Florida Field; Gainesville, FL (rivalry) | | W 22–3 | 36,000 | |
| November 10 | vs. Georgia | Gator Bowl Stadium; Jacksonville, FL (rivalry) | | W 23–15 | 42,000 | |
| November 17 | Florida State* | Florida Field; Gainesville, FL (rivalry) | | W 20–7 | 47,000 | |
| December 1 | at Miami (FL)* | Orange Bowl Stadium; Miami, FL (rivalry) | | L 15–17 | 62,441 | |
| December 29 | vs. No. 9 Penn State* | Gator Bowl Stadium; Jacksonville, FL (Gator Bowl) | CBS | W 17–7 | 50,286 | |
*Non-conference game; ^{†}Homecoming; Rankings from AP Poll released prior to the game

== Game summaries ==
=== Mississippi State ===
| Team | 1 | 2 | 3 | 4 | Total |
|---|---|---|---|---|---|
| • Florida | 0 | 6 | 7 | 6 | 19 |
| Mississippi State | 3 | 3 | 3 | 0 | 9 |

- Date: September 22
- Location: Mississippi Veterans Memorial Stadium, Jackson, MS

Scoring summary
| 1 | MSU | Sammy Datone 33 yard field goal | MSU 3-0 |
| 2 | MSU | Sammy Datone 21 yard field goal | MSU 6-0 |
| 2 | FLA | Larry Libertore 1 yard run (kick blocked) | Tied 6-6 |
| 3 | MSU | Sammy Datone 24 yard field goal | MSU 9-6 |
| 3 | FLA | Sam Mack 28 yard run (Jimmy Hall kick) | FLA 13-9 |
| 4 | FLA | Jim O'Donnell 1 yard run (kick failed) | FLA 19-9 |

=== Auburn ===
Auburn came to Gainesville ranked #5 and left with a 22–3 defeat. The Gators intercepted two passes, and recovered three fumbles.
