= 1962 Mississippi State Bulldogs football team =

American college football season

1962 Mississippi State Bulldogs football
- Conference: Southeastern Conference
- Record: 3–6 (2–5 SEC)
- Head coach: Paul E. Davis (1st season)
- Home stadium: Scott Field; Mississippi Veterans Memorial Stadium

1962 Southeastern Conference football standings
	Conf.					Overall
Team	W		L		T	W		L		T
No. 3 Ole Miss $	6	–	0	–	0	10	–	0	–	0
No. 5 Alabama	6	–	1	–	0	10	–	1	–	0
No. 7 LSU	5	–	1	–	0	9	–	1	–	1
Georgia Tech	5	–	2	–	0	7	–	3	–	1
Florida	4	–	2	–	0	7	–	4	–	0
Auburn	4	–	3	–	0	6	–	3	–	1
Georgia	2	–	3	–	1	3	–	4	–	3
Kentucky	2	–	3	–	1	3	–	5	–	2
Mississippi State	2	–	5	–	0	3	–	6	–	0
Tennessee	2	–	6	–	0	4	–	6	–	0
Vanderbilt	1	–	6	–	0	1	–	9	–	0
Tulane	0	–	7	–	0	0	–	10	–	0
$ – Conference champion; Rankings from AP Poll

The 1962 Mississippi State Bulldogs football team was an American football team that represented Mississippi State University as a member of the Southeastern Conference (SEC) during the 1962 NCAA University Division football season. In their first year under head coach Paul E. Davis, the team compiled an overall record of 3–6, with a mark of 2–5 in conference play, and finished 10th in the SEC.

== Schedule ==
Date	Opponent	Site	Result	Attendance	Source
September 22	Florida	Mississippi Veterans Memorial Stadium; Jackson, MS	L 9–19	32,000	
October 6	vs. Tennessee	Crump Stadium; Memphis, TN	W 7–6	22,013	
October 12	at Tulane	Tulane Stadium; New Orleans, LA	W 35–6		
October 20	at Houston*	Rice Stadium; Houston, TX	W 9–3	16,000	
October 27	Memphis State*	Scott Field; Starkville, MS	L 7–28	29,000	
November 3	No. 2 Alabama	Scott Field; Starkville, MS (rivalry)	L 0–20	26,000	
November 10	at Auburn	Cliff Hare Stadium; Auburn, AL	L 3–9	35,000	
November 17	No. 10 LSU	Mississippi Veterans Memorial Stadium; Jackson, MS (rivalry)	L 0–28	40,000	
December 1	at No. 3 Ole Miss	Hemingway Stadium; Oxford, MS (Egg Bowl)	L 6–13	30,000	
*Non-conference game; Rankings from AP Poll released prior to the game
