= 1962 Kansas State Wildcats football team =

American college football season

1962 Kansas State Wildcats football
- Conference: Big Eight Conference
- Record: 0–10 (0–7 Big 8)
- Head coach: Doug Weaver (3rd season)
- Home stadium: Memorial Stadium

1962 Big Eight Conference football standings
	Conf.					Overall
Team	W		L		T	W		L		T
No. 8 Oklahoma $	7	–	0	–	0	8	–	3	–	0
Missouri	5	–	1	–	1	8	–	1	–	2
Nebraska	5	–	2	–	0	9	–	2	–	0
Kansas	4	–	2	–	1	6	–	3	–	1
Iowa State	3	–	4	–	0	5	–	5	–	0
Oklahoma State	2	–	5	–	0	4	–	6	–	0
Colorado	1	–	6	–	0	2	–	8	–	0
Kansas State	0	–	7	–	0	0	–	10	–	0
$ – Conference champion; Rankings from AP Poll

The 1962 Kansas State Wildcats football team represented Kansas State University in the 1962 NCAA University Division football season. The team's head football coach was Doug Weaver. The Wildcats played their home games in Memorial Stadium. The Wildcats finished the season with a 0–10 record with a 0–7 record in conference play. They finished in eighth place. The Wildcats scored just 39 points and gave up 283 points.

== Schedule ==
Date	Opponent	Site	Result	Attendance	Source
September 22	at Indiana*	Seventeenth Street Stadium; Bloomington, IN	L 0–21	17,892	
September 29	at Colorado	Folsom Field; Boulder, CO (rivalry)	L 0–6	35,000	
October 6	at No. 8 Washington*	Husky Stadium; Seattle, WA	L 0–41	51,000	
October 13	Missouri	Memorial Stadium; Manhattan, KS	L 0–32	18,000	
October 20	at No. 6 Nebraska	Memorial Stadium; Lincoln, NE (rivalry)	L 6–26	30,000	
October 27	at Oklahoma	Oklahoma Memorial Stadium; Norman, OK	L 0–47	41,000	
November 3	Kansas	Memorial Stadium; Manhattan, KS (rivalry)	L 0–38	16,000	
November 10	at Arizona*	Arizona Stadium; Tucson, AZ	L 13–14	20,000	
November 17	Iowa State^{†}	Memorial Stadium; Manhattan, KS (rivalry)	L 14–28	9,500	
November 24	Oklahoma State	Memorial Stadium; Manhattan, KS	L 6–30	3,500	
*Non-conference game; ^{†}Homecoming; Rankings from AP Poll released prior to the game; Source:
