= 1962 Oklahoma Sooners football team =

American college football season

1962 Oklahoma Sooners football

Big 8 champion

Orange Bowl, L 0–17 vs. Alabama
- Conference: Big Eight Conference

Ranking
- Coaches: No. 7
- AP: No. 8
- Record: 8–3 (7–0 Big 8)
- Head coach: Bud Wilkinson (16th season)
- Captains: Leon Cross; Wayne Lee
- Home stadium: Oklahoma Memorial Stadium

1962 Big Eight Conference football standings
	Conf.					Overall
Team	W		L		T	W		L		T
No. 8 Oklahoma $	7	–	0	–	0	8	–	3	–	0
Missouri	5	–	1	–	1	8	–	1	–	2
Nebraska	5	–	2	–	0	9	–	2	–	0
Kansas	4	–	2	–	1	6	–	3	–	1
Iowa State	3	–	4	–	0	5	–	5	–	0
Oklahoma State	2	–	5	–	0	4	–	6	–	0
Colorado	1	–	6	–	0	2	–	8	–	0
Kansas State	0	–	7	–	0	0	–	10	–	0
$ – Conference champion; Rankings from AP Poll

The 1962 Oklahoma Sooners football team represented the University of Oklahoma in the Big Eight Conference during the 1962 NCAA University Division football season. In their sixteenth season under head coach Bud Wilkinson, the Sooners were 8–2 in the regular season (7–0 in conference) and played their home games on campus at Oklahoma Memorial Stadium in Norman, Oklahoma.

In the Orange Bowl on New Year's Day, the Sooners were shut out 17–0 by fifth-ranked Alabama and finished at 8–3.

== Schedule ==
Date	Time	Opponent	Rank	Site	TV	Result	Attendance	Source
September 22		Syracuse*		Oklahoma Memorial Stadium; Norman, OK		W 7–3	54,000	
September 29		Notre Dame*		Oklahoma Memorial Stadium; Norman, OK	CBS	L 7–13	60,500	
October 13		vs. No. 2 Texas*		Cotton Bowl; Dallas, TX (Red River Shootout)	CBS	L 6–9	75,504	
October 20		at Kansas		Memorial Stadium; Lawrence, KS		W 13–7	38,000	
October 27		Kansas State		Oklahoma Memorial Stadium; Norman, OK		W 47–0	41,000	
November 3		at Colorado		Folsom Field; Boulder, CO		W 62–0	24,500	
November 10	1:30 p.m.	at Iowa State		Clyde Williams Field; Ames, IA		W 41–0	16,000	
November 17		No. 6 Missouri		Oklahoma Memorial Stadium; Norman, OK (rivalry)		W 13–0	61,826	
November 24		Nebraska	No. 10	Oklahoma Memorial Stadium; Norman, OK (rivalry)		W 34–6	60,000	
December 1		at Oklahoma State	No. 8	Lewis Field; Stillwater, OK (Bedlam Series)		W 37–6	34,000	
January 1, 1963		vs. No. 5 Alabama*	No. 8	Miami Orange Bowl; Miami, FL (Orange Bowl)	ABC	L 0–17	73,380	
*Non-conference game; Rankings from AP Poll released prior to the game; All times are in Central time; Source:

== Rankings ==
Ranking movements Legend: ██ Increase in ranking ██ Decrease in ranking — = Not ranked
	Week											
Poll	Pre	1	2	3	4	5	6	7	8	9	10	Final
AP	—	—	—	—	—	—	—	—	—	10	8	8

== Roster ==
- HB Joe Don Looney, Jr.

== After the season ==
=== NFL draft ===
Three Sooners were selected in the 1963 NFL draft.

Round	Pick	Player	Position	NFL team
8	101	Jim Cook	Guard	St. Louis Cardinals
9	116	Dennis Ward	Tackle	Philadelphia Eagles
14	185	Paul Lea	Back	St. Louis Cardinals

=== Staff ===
After the season in early January, 31-year-old assistant coach Eddie Crowder, a former Sooner quarterback, was hired as head coach at the University of Colorado, also a member of the Big Eight.
