= 1962 Iowa State Cyclones football team =

American college football season

1962 Iowa State Cyclones football
- Conference: Big Eight Conference
- Record: 5–5 (3–4 Big 8)
- Head coach: Clay Stapleton (5th season)
- Captain: Jim Clapper
- Home stadium: Clyde Williams Field

1962 Big Eight Conference football standings
	Conf.					Overall
Team	W		L		T	W		L		T
No. 8 Oklahoma $	7	–	0	–	0	8	–	3	–	0
Missouri	5	–	1	–	1	8	–	1	–	2
Nebraska	5	–	2	–	0	9	–	2	–	0
Kansas	4	–	2	–	1	6	–	3	–	1
Iowa State	3	–	4	–	0	5	–	5	–	0
Oklahoma State	2	–	5	–	0	4	–	6	–	0
Colorado	1	–	6	–	0	2	–	8	–	0
Kansas State	0	–	7	–	0	0	–	10	–	0
$ – Conference champion; Rankings from AP Poll

The 1962 Iowa State Cyclones football team represented Iowa State University in the Big Eight Conference during the 1962 NCAA University Division football season. In their fifth year under head coach Clay Stapleton, the Cyclones compiled a 5–5 record (3–4 against conference opponents), finished in fifth place in the conference, and scored the same number of points (235) as they allowed on defense. They played their home games at Clyde Williams Field in Ames, Iowa.

The regular starting lineup on offense consisted of left end Larry Schreiber, left tackle John Van Sicklen, left guard Tim Brown, center Ray Steffy, right guard Dick Walton, right tackle Norm Taylor, right end John McGonegle, quarterback Larry Switzer, halfbacks Dave Hoppmann and Otis Williams, and fullback Tim Vaughn. Larry Schreiber was the placekicker. Jim Clapper was the team captain.

The team's statistical leaders included Dave Hoppmann with 798 rushing yards, 679 passing yards, and 66 points (11 touchdowns), and Dick Limerick with 296 receiving yards. Hoppman was selected as a first-team all-conference player.

The 1962 season was the last time the Cyclones hosted the Oklahoma Sooners until 1966, due to Cyclones making more money playing games in Norman, Oklahoma than they did at home.

== Schedule ==
Date	Time	Opponent	Site	Result	Attendance	Source
September 15	1:30 pm	Drake*	Clyde Williams Field; Ames, IA	W 14–7	22,000	
September 22	9:00 pm	at Oregon State*	Multnomah Stadium; Portland, OR	L 35–39	30,430	
October 6	2:00 pm	at Nebraska	Memorial Stadium; Lincoln, NE (rivalry)	L 22–36	34,000	
October 13	1:30 pm	Kansas^{†}	Clyde Williams Field; Ames, IA	L 8–29	22,500	
October 20	1:30 pm	Colorado	Clyde Williams Field; Ames, IA	W 57–19	19,500	
October 27	1:30 pm	at Missouri	Memorial Stadium; Columbia, MO (rivalry)	L 6–21	40,700	
November 3	1:30 pm	at Oklahoma State	Lewis Field; Stillwater, OK	W 34–7	15,000	
November 10	1:30 pm	Oklahoma	Clyde Williams Field; Ames, IA	L 0–41	16,000	
November 17	1:30 pm	at Kansas State	Memorial Stadium; Manhattan, KS (rivalry)	W 28–14	9,500	
November 24	1:30 pm	Ohio*	Clyde Williams Field; Ames, IA	W 31–22	10,000	
*Non-conference game; ^{†}Homecoming; All times are in Central time; Source:
