= 1962 Georgia Bulldogs football team =

American college football season

1962 Georgia Bulldogs football
- Conference: Southeastern Conference
- Record: 3–4–3 (2–3–1 SEC)
- Head coach: Johnny Griffith (2nd season)
- Home stadium: Sanford Stadium

1962 Southeastern Conference football standings
	Conf.					Overall
Team	W		L		T	W		L		T
No. 3 Ole Miss $	6	–	0	–	0	10	–	0	–	0
No. 5 Alabama	6	–	1	–	0	10	–	1	–	0
No. 7 LSU	5	–	1	–	0	9	–	1	–	1
Georgia Tech	5	–	2	–	0	7	–	3	–	1
Florida	4	–	2	–	0	7	–	4	–	0
Auburn	4	–	3	–	0	6	–	3	–	1
Georgia	2	–	3	–	1	3	–	4	–	3
Kentucky	2	–	3	–	1	3	–	5	–	2
Mississippi State	2	–	5	–	0	3	–	6	–	0
Tennessee	2	–	6	–	0	4	–	6	–	0
Vanderbilt	1	–	6	–	0	1	–	9	–	0
Tulane	0	–	7	–	0	0	–	10	–	0
$ – Conference champion; Rankings from AP Poll

The 1962 Georgia Bulldogs football team represented the University of Georgia as a member of the Southeastern Conference (SEC) during the 1962 NCAA University Division football season. Led by second-year head coach Johnny Griffith, the Bulldogs compiled an overall record of 3–4–3 with a mark of 2–3–1 in conference play, and finished tied for seventh in the SEC.

== Schedule ==
Date	Opponent	Site	Result	Attendance	Source
September 22	at No. 3 Alabama	Legion Field; Birmingham, AL (rivalry)	L 0–35	54,000	
September 29	at Vanderbilt	Dudley Field; Nashville, TN (rivalry)	W 10–0	18,000	
October 6	at South Carolina*	Carolina Stadium; Columbia, SC (rivalry)	T 7–7	28,000	
October 13	at Clemson*	Memorial Stadium; Clemson, SC (rivalry)	W 24–16	30,000	
October 20	Florida State*	Sanford Stadium; Athens, GA	L 0–18	31,500	
October 27	Kentucky^{†}	Sanford Stadium; Athens, GA	T 7–7	32,000	
November 3	NC State*	Sanford Stadium; Athens, GA	T 10–10	31,000	
November 10	vs. Florida	Gator Bowl Stadium; Jacksonville, FL (rivalry)	L 15–23	42,000	
November 17	at Auburn	Cliff Hare Stadium; Auburn, AL (rivalry)	W 30–21	35,000	
December 1	Georgia Tech	Sanford Stadium; Athens, GA (rivalry)	L 6–37	55,000	
*Non-conference game; ^{†}Homecoming; Rankings from AP Poll released prior to the game
