= 1962 Georgia Tech Yellow Jackets football team =

American college football season

1962 Georgia Tech Yellow Jackets football

Bluebonnet Bowl, L 10–14 vs. Missouri
- Conference: Southeastern Conference

Ranking
- Coaches: No. 11
- Record: 7–3–1 (5–2 SEC)
- Head coach: Bobby Dodd (18th season)
- Captain: Tom Winingder
- Home stadium: Grant Field

1962 Southeastern Conference football standings
	Conf.					Overall
Team	W		L		T	W		L		T
No. 3 Ole Miss $	6	–	0	–	0	10	–	0	–	0
No. 5 Alabama	6	–	1	–	0	10	–	1	–	0
No. 7 LSU	5	–	1	–	0	9	–	1	–	1
Georgia Tech	5	–	2	–	0	7	–	3	–	1
Florida	4	–	2	–	0	7	–	4	–	0
Auburn	4	–	3	–	0	6	–	3	–	1
Georgia	2	–	3	–	1	3	–	4	–	3
Kentucky	2	–	3	–	1	3	–	5	–	2
Mississippi State	2	–	5	–	0	3	–	6	–	0
Tennessee	2	–	6	–	0	4	–	6	–	0
Vanderbilt	1	–	6	–	0	1	–	9	–	0
Tulane	0	–	7	–	0	0	–	10	–	0
$ – Conference champion; Rankings from AP Poll

The 1962 Georgia Tech Yellow Jackets football team represented the Georgia Institute of Technology during the 1962 NCAA University Division football season. The Yellow Jackets were led by 18th-year head coach Bobby Dodd, and played their home games at the newly expanded Grant Field in Atlanta.

On November 17, Georgia Tech pulled off a huge upset over defending national champions Alabama, ending their 27-game undefeated streak. The Yellow Jackets stopped a go-ahead two point conversion from Alabama and then intercepted a pass from Joe Namath deep in Georgia Tech territory late in the fourth quarter to seal the deal. Georgia Tech finished the regular season fourth in the Southeastern Conference, with a 7–2–1 overall record and ranked 11th in the final Coaches' Poll. They were invited to the 1962 Bluebonnet Bowl, where they lost to Missouri.

== Schedule ==
Date	Opponent	Rank	Site	TV	Result	Attendance	Source
September 22	Clemson*		Grant Field; Atlanta, GA (rivalry)		W 26–9	51,140	
September 29	at Florida	No. 8	Florida Field; Gainesville FL		W 17–0	46,000	
October 6	LSU	No. 5	Grant Field; Atlanta, GA	NBC	L 7–10	49,744	
October 13	Tennessee		Grant Field; Atlanta, GA (rivalry)		W 17–0	52,223	
October 20	at Auburn		Legion Field; Birmingham, AL (rivalry)		L 14–17	56,319	
October 27	Tulane^{†}		Grant Field; Atlanta, GA		W 42–12	46,370	
November 3	at Duke*		Duke Stadium; Durham, NC		W 20–9	44,000	
November 10	Florida State*		Grant Field; Atlanta, GA		T 14–14	43,802	
November 17	No. 1 Alabama		Grant Field; Atlanta, GA (rivalry)		W 7–6	52,971	
December 1	at Georgia		Sanford Stadium; Athens, GA (rivalry)		W 37–6	55,000	
December 22	vs. Missouri*		Rice Stadium; Houston, TX (Bluebonnet Bowl)	CBS	L 10–14	55,000	
*Non-conference game; ^{†}Homecoming; Rankings from AP Poll released prior to the game
