= 1962 Kansas Jayhawks football team =

American college football season

1962 Kansas Jayhawks football
- Conference: Big Eight Conference
- Record: 6–3–1 (4–2–1 Big 8)
- Head coach: Jack Mitchell (5th season)
- Captains: Rodger McFarland; Ken Tiger
- Home stadium: Memorial Stadium

1962 Big Eight Conference football standings
	Conf.					Overall
Team	W		L		T	W		L		T
No. 8 Oklahoma $	7	–	0	–	0	8	–	3	–	0
Missouri	5	–	1	–	1	8	–	1	–	2
Nebraska	5	–	2	–	0	9	–	2	–	0
Kansas	4	–	2	–	1	6	–	3	–	1
Iowa State	3	–	4	–	0	5	–	5	–	0
Oklahoma State	2	–	5	–	0	4	–	6	–	0
Colorado	1	–	6	–	0	2	–	8	–	0
Kansas State	0	–	7	–	0	0	–	10	–	0
$ – Conference champion; Rankings from AP Poll

The 1962 Kansas Jayhawks football team represented the University of Kansas in the Big Eight Conference during the 1962 NCAA University Division football season. In their fifth season under head coach Jack Mitchell, the Jayhawks compiled a 6–3–1 record (4–2–1 against conference opponents), finished fourth in the Big Eight Conference, and outscored all opponents by a combined total of 214 to 116. They played their home games at Memorial Stadium in Lawrence, Kansas.

The team's statistical leaders included Gale Sayers with 1,125 rushing yards, Lloyd Buzzi with 118 receiving yards and Rodger McFarland with 366 passing yards. McFarland and Ken Tiger were the team captains.

== Schedule ==
Date	Opponent	Site	Result	Attendance	Source
September 22	TCU*	Memorial Stadium; Lawrence, KS	L 3–6	35,000	
September 29	at Boston University*	Boston University Field; Boston, MA	W 14–0	11,000	
October 6	Colorado	Memorial Stadium; Lawrence, KS	W 35–8	32,000	
October 13	at Iowa State	Clyde Williams Field; Ames, IA	W 29–8	22,500	
October 20	Oklahoma	Memorial Stadium; Lawrence, KS	L 7–13	38,000	
October 27	at Oklahoma State	Lewis Field; Stillwater, OK	W 36–17	18,000	
November 3	at Kansas State	Memorial Stadium; Manhattan, KS (rivalry)	W 38–0	16,000	
November 10	Nebraska^{†}	Memorial Stadium; Lawrence, KS (rivalry)	L 16–40	38,000	
November 17	California*	Memorial Stadium; Lawrence, KS	W 33–21	32,000	
November 24	at Missouri	Memorial Stadium; Columbia, MO (Border War)	T 3–3	46,000	
*Non-conference game; ^{†}Homecoming; Source:

== Roster ==
1962 Kansas Jayhawks football team roster
Players			Coaches
Offense: Pos. / # / Name / Class; RB / 48 / Gale Sayers / So	Defense: Pos. / # / Name / Class	Special teams: Pos. / # / Name / Class	Head coach Jack Mitchell Coordinators/assistant coaches Legend: (C) Team captain; (S) Suspended; (I) Ineligible; Injured; Redshirt
