= 1962 Colorado Buffaloes football team =

American college football season

1962 Colorado Buffaloes football
- Conference: Big Eight Conference
- Record: 2–8 (1–6 Big 8)
- Head coach: William E. Davis (1st season)
- MVP: Ken Blair
- Captain: Ken Blair
- Home stadium: Folsom Field

1962 Big Eight Conference football standings
	Conf.					Overall
Team	W		L		T	W		L		T
No. 8 Oklahoma $	7	–	0	–	0	8	–	3	–	0
Missouri	5	–	1	–	1	8	–	1	–	2
Nebraska	5	–	2	–	0	9	–	2	–	0
Kansas	4	–	2	–	1	6	–	3	–	1
Iowa State	3	–	4	–	0	5	–	5	–	0
Oklahoma State	2	–	5	–	0	4	–	6	–	0
Colorado	1	–	6	–	0	2	–	8	–	0
Kansas State	0	–	7	–	0	0	–	10	–	0
$ – Conference champion; Rankings from AP Poll

The 1962 Colorado Buffaloes football team was an American football team that represented the University of Colorado in the Big Eight Conference during the 1962 NCAA University Division football season. Led by William E. Davis in his only season as head coach, the Buffaloes compiled an overall record of 2–8 with a mark of 1–6 in conference play, placing seventh in the Big 8.

At the time, it was the worst record in the program's history; Davis' resignation was announced shortly after the 34–10 upset of Air Force in the season finale.

Earlier in the year in March, previous head coach Sonny Grandelius was fired by the university regents for recruiting violations, primarily due to the operation of a slush fund for players and families. Ten days later, alumni director Davis was hired as the interim head coach; he had no collegiate coaching experience, just five years as a high school head coach.

A month later, the NCAA put the CU football program on probation for two years; because the university began the investigation and took action, the penalties were relatively light.

== Schedule ==
Date	Opponent	Site	Result	Attendance	Source
September 22	at Utah*	Ute Stadium; Salt Lake City, UT (rivalry)	L 21–37	25,878	
September 29	Kansas State	Folsom Field; Boulder, CO (rivalry)	W 6–0	35,000	
October 6	at Kansas	Memorial Stadium; Lawrence, KS	L 8–35	32,000	
October 13	at Oklahoma State	Lewis Field; Stillwater, OK	L 16–36	25,000	
October 20	at Iowa State	Clyde Williams Field; Ames, IA	L 19–57	19,500	
October 27	Nebraska^{†}	Folsom Field; Boulder, CO (rivalry)	L 6–31	35,500	
November 3	Oklahoma	Folsom Field; Boulder, CO	L 0–62	24,500	
November 10	at No. 7 Missouri	Memorial Stadium; Columbia, MO	L 0–57	42,500	
November 17	at Texas Tech*	Jones Stadium; Lubbock, TX	L 12–21	10,000	
November 24	Air Force*	Folsom Field; Boulder, CO	W 34–10	21,000	
*Non-conference game; ^{†}Homecoming; Rankings from AP Poll released prior to the game; Source:

== Coaching staff ==
- Dallas Ward (defense)
- Bob Beckett (line)
- Paul Cantwell (ends)
- Ed Farhat (secondary)
- Jim Smith (backs)
- Don Stimack (freshmen)
