= 1962 Oklahoma State Cowboys football team =

American college football season

1962 Oklahoma State Cowboys football
- Conference: Big Eight Conference
- Record: 4–6 (2–5 Big 8)
- Head coach: Cliff Speegle (8th season)
- Home stadium: Lewis Field

1962 Big Eight Conference football standings
| | Conf. | | | | | Overall |
| Team | W | | L | | T | W | | L | | T |
|---|---|---|---|---|---|---|---|---|---|---|
| No. 8 Oklahoma $ | 7 | – | 0 | – | 0 | 8 | – | 3 | – | 0 |
| Missouri | 5 | – | 1 | – | 1 | 8 | – | 1 | – | 2 |
| Nebraska | 5 | – | 2 | – | 0 | 9 | – | 2 | – | 0 |
| Kansas | 4 | – | 2 | – | 1 | 6 | – | 3 | – | 1 |
| Iowa State | 3 | – | 4 | – | 0 | 5 | – | 5 | – | 0 |
| Oklahoma State | 2 | – | 5 | – | 0 | 4 | – | 6 | – | 0 |
| Colorado | 1 | – | 6 | – | 0 | 2 | – | 8 | – | 0 |
| Kansas State | 0 | – | 7 | – | 0 | 0 | – | 10 | – | 0 |
$ – Conference champion; Rankings from AP Poll

The 1962 Oklahoma State Cowboys football team represented Oklahoma State University–Stillwater in the Big Eight Conference during the 1962 NCAA University Division football season. In their eighth and final season under head coach Cliff Speegle, the Cowboys compiled a 4–6 record (2–5 against conference opponents), finished in sixth place in the conference, and were outscored by opponents by a combined total of 214 to 138.

On offense, the 1962 team averaged 13.8 points scored, 152.7 rushing yards, and 110.2 passing yards per game. On defense, the team allowed an average of 21.4 points scored, 261.8 rushing yards, and 97.0 passing yards per game. The team's statistical leaders included Don Derrick with 539 rushing yards and 24 yards, Mike Miller with 1,056 passing yards, and Don Karns with 328 receiving yards.

No Oklahoma State players were selected as first-team All-Big Eight Conference players.

The team played its home games at Lewis Field in Stillwater, Oklahoma.

== Schedule ==
| Date | Opponent | Site | Result | Attendance | Source |
|---|---|---|---|---|---|
| September 22 | at Arkansas* | War Memorial Stadium; Little Rock, AR | L 7–34 | 40,000 | |
| October 6 | at Tulsa* | Skelly Stadium; Tulsa, OK (rivalry) | W 17–7 | 15,022 | |
| October 13 | Colorado^{†} | Lewis Field; Stillwater, OK | W 36–16 | 25,000 | |
| October 20 | at Missouri | Memorial Stadium; Columbia, MO | L 6–23 | 37,000 | |
| October 27 | Kansas | Lewis Field; Stillwater, OK | L 17–36 | 18,000 | |
| November 3 | Iowa State | Lewis Field; Stillwater, OK | L 7–34 | 15,000 | |
| November 10 | at Army* | Michie Stadium; West Point, NY | W 12–7 | 31,000 | |
| November 17 | at Nebraska | Memorial Stadium; Lincoln, NE | L 0–14 | 34,000 | |
| November 24 | at Kansas State | Memorial Stadium; Manhattan, KS | W 30–6 | 3,500 | |
| December 1 | No. 8 Oklahoma | Lewis Field; Stillwater, OK (Bedlam Series) | L 6–37 | 34,000 | |
*Non-conference game; ^{†}Homecoming; Rankings from AP Poll released prior to the game; Source:
