= 1962 Nebraska Cornhuskers football team =

American college football season

1962 Nebraska Cornhuskers football

Gotham Bowl champion

Gotham Bowl, W 36–34 vs. Miami (FL)
- Conference: Big Eight Conference
- Record: 9–2 (5–2 Big 8)
- Head coach: Bob Devaney (1st season)
- Home stadium: Memorial Stadium

1962 Big Eight Conference football standings
	Conf.					Overall
Team	W		L		T	W		L		T
No. 8 Oklahoma $	7	–	0	–	0	8	–	3	–	0
Missouri	5	–	1	–	1	8	–	1	–	2
Nebraska	5	–	2	–	0	9	–	2	–	0
Kansas	4	–	2	–	1	6	–	3	–	1
Iowa State	3	–	4	–	0	5	–	5	–	0
Oklahoma State	2	–	5	–	0	4	–	6	–	0
Colorado	1	–	6	–	0	2	–	8	–	0
Kansas State	0	–	7	–	0	0	–	10	–	0
$ – Conference champion; Rankings from AP Poll

The 1962 Nebraska Cornhuskers football team represented the University of Nebraska in the Big Eight Conference during the 1962 NCAA University Division football season. Led by first-year head coach Bob Devaney, the Huskers were 8–2 (5–2 in Big 8, third) in the regular season, and played their home games on campus at Memorial Stadium in Lincoln, Nebraska.

Undefeated through October, their loss to Missouri on November 3 marked the start of Nebraska's current NCAA record of 400 consecutive sellouts. At the chilly Gotham Bowl in New York City in mid-December, they defeated Miami 36–34 to finish at 9–2.

Hired in February, Devaney was previously the head coach for five seasons at the University of Wyoming in Laramie. He coached Nebraska for eleven seasons, won consecutive national titles (1970, 1971), and was the athletic director from 1967 to 1992.

== Schedule ==
Date	Time	Opponent	Site	TV	Result	Attendance	Source
September 22	2:00 pm	South Dakota*	Memorial Stadium; Lincoln, NE		W 53–0	27,000	
September 29	12:30 pm	at Michigan*	Michigan Stadium; Ann Arbor, MI		W 25–13	70,287	
October 6	2:00 pm	Iowa State	Memorial Stadium; Lincoln, NE (rivalry)		W 36–22	34,000	
October 13	2:00 pm	NC State*	Memorial Stadium; Lincoln, NE		W 19–14	36,867	
October 20	2:00 pm	Kansas State	Memorial Stadium; Lincoln, NE (rivalry)		W 26–6	30,000	
October 27	2:30 pm	at Colorado	Folsom Field; Boulder, CO (rivalry)		W 31–6	35,500	
November 3	2:00 pm	Missouri^{†}	Memorial Stadium; Lincoln, NE (rivalry)		L 7–16	36,501	
November 10	1:30 pm	at Kansas	Memorial Stadium; Lawrence, KS (rivalry)		W 40–16	38,000	
November 17	2:00 pm	Oklahoma State	Memorial Stadium; Lincoln, NE		W 14–0	34,000	
November 24	1:30 pm	at No. 10 Oklahoma	Oklahoma Memorial Stadium; Norman, OK (rivalry)		L 6–34	60,000	
December 15	10:00 am	vs. Miami (FL)*	Yankee Stadium; Bronx, NY (Gotham Bowl, rivalry)	ABC	W 36–34	6,166	
*Non-conference game; ^{†}Homecoming; Rankings from AP Poll released prior to the game; All times are in Central time; Source:

== Roster ==
48 Baffico, James LG (Jr.); 61 Brown, Robert RG (Jr.); 46 Brown, Ulysses RG (Sr.); 89 Bryant, Curtis E (Jr.); 80 Callahan, Richard E (Jr.); 62 Carlson, Dwain LG (Sr.); 14 Claridge, Dennis QB (Jr.); 82 Comstock, William E (Sr.); 65 Dervin, John LG (So.); 81 Doepke, Charles E (So.); 87 Donovan, Larry E (Sr.); 53 Drum, Duncan C (So.); Eger, Mike E; 15 Faiman, John QB (Sr.); 76 Fischer, Allen (Richard) RT (Sr.); 50 Fugitt, Mike C (So.); 69 Garner, Chuck LG (Jr.); 64 Gray, Gary LG (So.); 79 Griesse, Ronald RT (Jr.); 57 Haas, Dave RT (So.); 85 Huge, James E (Sr.); 58 Johnson, LaVane RG (Jr.); 31 Johnson, Rudy HB (Jr.); 74 Jones, Robert LT (Sr.); 77 Kiffin, Monte LT (Jr.); 68 Kirby, John LG (Jr.); 40 Koehler, Mike FB (Sr.); 86 Koinzan, John E (So.); 75 Kramer, Larry LT (Jr.); 18 Lucas, Gary E (So.)	42 Martin, Noel FB (Sr.); 32 McCloughan, Kent HB (So.); 63 McDermott, Donald RG (So.); 41 McNulty, Joe FB (So.); 54 Michka, Ron C (Jr.); 73 Osentowski, Clarence LT (So.); 33 Paschell, Willie HB (So.); 37 Peterson, Robert RT (Jr.); 20 Powers, Warren HB (Sr.); 70 Robertson, Tyrone LT (Sr.); 10 Rogers, Bill RG (So.); 66 Rood, Jed RG (Sr.); 21 Ross, Willie HB (Jr.); 35 Sebastian, John HB (So.); 52 Sittler, Lyle C (So.); 22 Smidt, Maynard HB (Jr.); 43 Smith, Bruce FB (So.); 51 Stevenson, Donald C (Sr.); 72 Strohmyer, John RT (So.); 34 Stuewe, Dennis HB (Sr.); 23 Theisen, David HB (Jr.); 30 Thornton, Bill FB (Sr.); 83 Tomlinson, Larry E (Jr.); 67 Toogood, Gary RG (Sr.); 36 Tregonning, Donn RG (Jr.); 17 Tucker, Douglas QB (So.); Van Newkirk, Milan PK; 71 Voss, Lloyd RT (Jr.); 24 Vujevich, John HB (So.); 44 Young, Gene FB (Jr.)

== Depth chart ==
Defensive starters

HB
14 Dennis Claridge

HB
32 Kent McCloughan

LB	LB
62 Dwain Carlson	64 Bob Brown
68 John Kirby	67 Gary Toogood

CB
23 David Theisen

DE	DT	NT	DT	DE
84 Mike Eger	71 Lloyd Voss	54 Ron Michka	70 Tyrone Robertson	83 Larry Tomlinson
88 James Huge	76 Richard Fischer	56 James Baffico	75 Larry Kramer	87 Larry Donovan

CB
20 Warren Powers

Offensive starters

LE
Larry Donovan
Larry Tomlinson
Mike Eger

LG	C	RG	LT	RT
Dwain Carlson	Ron Michka	Bob Brown	Tyrone Robertson	Lloyd Voss
John Kirby	James Baffico	Gary Toogood	Larry Kramer	Richard Fischer

RE
James Huge
Richard Callahan
William Comstock

QB
Dennis Claridge
John Faiman

LB	RB	FB
Willie Ross	Rudy Johnson; Dennis Stuewe	Bill Thornton
Warren Powers	Kent McCloughan	Gene Young

== Coaching staff ==
Name	Title	First year in this position	Years at Nebraska	Alma mater
Bob Devaney	Head Coach	1962	1962–1972	Alma
John Melton		1962	1962–1988	Wyoming
Cletus Fischer		1960	1960–1985	Nebraska
Mike Corgan	Running Backs	1962	1962–1982	Notre Dame
George Kelly		1960	1960–1968	
Jim Ross		1962	1962–1976	
Carl Selmer	Offensive Line	1962	1962–1972	

== Game summaries ==
=== South Dakota ===
Team	1	2	3	4	Total
South Dakota	0	0	0	0	0
• Nebraska	6	13	20	14	53

- Date: September 22
- Location: Memorial Stadium, Lincoln, Nebraska
- Game attendance: 26,953

=== Michigan ===
Team	1	2	3	4	Total
• Nebraska	0	7	12	6	25
Michigan	0	6	0	7	13

- Date: September 29
- Location: Michigan Stadium, Ann Arbor, Michigan
- Game attendance: 70,287

=== Iowa State ===
Team	1	2	3	4	Total
Iowa State	0	7	7	8	22
• Nebraska	14	14	0	8	36

- Date: October 6
- Location: Memorial Stadium, Lincoln, Nebraska
- Game attendance: 34,321

=== NC State ===
Team	1	2	3	4	Total
NC State	6	0	8	0	14
• Nebraska	0	0	7	12	19

- Date: October 13
- Location: Memorial Stadium, Lincoln, Nebraska
- Game attendance: 36,867

=== Kansas State ===
This was the last Nebraska home football game to not be sold out.

Team	1	2	3	4	Total
Kansas State	6	0	0	0	6
• Nebraska	0	14	12	0	26

- Date: October 20
- Location: Memorial Stadium, Lincoln, Nebraska
- Game attendance: 30,701

=== Colorado ===
Team	1	2	3	4	Total
• Nebraska	0	0	23	8	31
Colorado	0	6	0	0	6

- Date: October 27
- Location: Folsom Field, Boulder, Colorado
- Game attendance: 34,183

=== Missouri ===
Team	1	2	3	4	Total
• Missouri	7	0	3	6	16
Nebraska	0	7	0	0	7

- Date: November 3
- Location: Memorial Stadium, Lincoln, Nebraska
- Game attendance: 36,501

This is the first game of Nebraska's NCAA record of consecutive sellouts, which currently stands at 386 sellouts continuing to the 2022 season.

=== Kansas ===
Team	1	2	3	4	Total
• Nebraska	16	16	8	0	40
Kansas	0	0	8	8	16

- Date: November 10
- Location: Memorial Stadium, Lawrence, Kansas
- Game attendance: 37,063

=== Oklahoma State ===
Team	1	2	3	4	Total
Oklahoma State	0	0	0	0	0
• Nebraska	14	0	0	0	14

- Date: November 17
- Location: Memorial Stadium, Lincoln, Nebraska
- Game attendance: 34,329

=== Oklahoma ===
Team	1	2	3	4	Total
Nebraska	0	0	6	0	6
• #10 Oklahoma	7	7	14	6	34

- Date: November 24
- Location: Oklahoma Memorial Stadium, Norman, Oklahoma
- Game attendance: 58,268

=== Miami (FL) ===
Team	1	2	3	4	Total
• Nebraska	6	14	8	8	36
Miami	6	14	7	7	34

- Date: December 15
- Location: Yankee Stadium, New York City
- Game attendance: 6,166

== After the season ==
=== Awards ===
- All Big 8: Robert Brown, Dennis Claridge, Tyrone Robertson

== Future professional players ==
- Robert Brown, 1964 2nd overall pick by the Philadelphia Eagles
- Dennis Claridge, 1963 3rd-round pick of the Green Bay Packers
- Rudy Johnson, 1964 5th-round pick of the San Francisco 49ers
- Bob Jones, 1964 18th-round pick of the Washington Redskins
- Monte Kiffin, 1964 15th-round pick of the Minnesota Vikings
- John Kirby, 1964 5th-round pick of the Minnesota Vikings
- Larry Kramer, 1964 15th-round pick of the Baltimore Colts
- Willie Ross, 1964 9th-round pick of the St. Louis Cardinals
- Dave Theisen, 1963 11th-round pick of the Los Angeles Rams
- Bill (Thunder) Thornton, 1963 5th-round pick of the St. Louis Cardinals
- Lloyd Voss, 1964 1st-round pick of the Green Bay Packers
