= Arkansas–Ole Miss football rivalry =

American college football rivalry

- Arkansas Razorbacks Ole Miss Rebels
- First meeting: October 10, 1908; Arkansas, 33–0
- Latest meeting: September 13, 2025; Ole Miss, 41–35
- Next meeting: 2027

Statistics
- Total meetings: 72
- All-time series: Arkansas leads, 38–31–1 (per Arkansas); Arkansas leads, 37–32–1 (per Ole Miss)
- Longest win streak: Ole Miss, 6 (1958–1970)
- Current win streak: Ole Miss, 3 (2023–present)

Locations of Arkansas and Ole Miss

The Arkansas–Ole Miss football rivalry is an American college football rivalry between the Arkansas Razorbacks football team of the University of Arkansas and the Ole Miss Rebels football team of the University of Mississippi. The teams first met in 1908, and have played each other every year since 1981. Arkansas leads the series, which includes two wins by Ole Miss in postseason bowl games, the 1963 and 1970 Sugar Bowls.

== History ==
The rivalry between Arkansas and Ole Miss developed partially due to geography. Besides being neighboring states in the southeastern United States, from the University of Arkansas' perspective, before the addition of Missouri, the University of Mississippi was closer in terms of distance than any other Southeastern Conference school. Arkansas has played Ole Miss more than any other SEC opponent with the exception of Texas A&M.

=== Pre 1980s ===
The teams were first scheduled to meet each other in 1906, but due to a cancellation, the two teams began play against one another in a 1908 contest in which Arkansas won by a score of 33–0. Arkansas and Mississippi played many times sporadically in the following years. In addition to several single years of playing each other, the two teams played each other from 1940–47 and 1952–62 on an annual basis. The Razorbacks and Rebels also met twice in the Sugar Bowl played in New Orleans, in 1963 and 1970; both contests were won by Ole Miss. Especially in the early years, the teams often met in Memphis, Tennessee to play the game, besides the normal Arkansas and Mississippi game sites.

=== 1980s to present ===
Since 1981, the two teams have played each other annually in football. The games have generally alternated yearly between a site in Mississippi (Jackson, or more recently Oxford) and a site in Arkansas (Little Rock, or more recently Fayetteville), except for one time in 1995 when the game was played in Memphis, Tennessee. Since Arkansas joined the Southeastern Conference in 1991 (first football season was 1992; previously a member of the SWC), the two teams have played annually as both conference and Western division rivals.

=== Recently (2000s–2010s) ===
In 2001, Arkansas and Ole Miss had an NCAA record seven-overtime game in Oxford, Mississippi.

==== Houston Nutt association ====
Upon the conclusion of the 2007 regular season, Arkansas Razorbacks coach Houston Nutt was forced to resign amid several controversies and allegations that had arisen. Hours later, he was announced as the head coach of the Ole Miss Rebels football team, replacing Ed Orgeron who had been fired after three consecutive losing seasons.

Ole Miss and Arkansas met in Fayetteville on October 25, 2008, with identical 3–4 records. This marked Nutt's first return to the University of Arkansas campus as an opposing coach. Nutt led his Rebels to a 23–21 victory over the Razorbacks. Nutt was fired by Ole Miss at the end of the 2011 season, ending his association with this rivalry.

== Game results ==
The results of games played between Arkansas and Ole Miss:

Arkansas victories	Ole Miss victories	Tie games	Disputed games

No.	Date	Location	Winner	Score
1	October 10, 1908	Fayetteville, Arkansas	Arkansas	33–0
2	November 15, 1913	Little Rock, Arkansas	Ole Miss	21–10
3	November 14, 1914	Little Rock, Arkansas	Ole Miss†	13–7
4	October 25, 1924	Little Rock, Arkansas	Arkansas	20–0
5	October 2, 1926	Fayetteville, Arkansas	Arkansas	21–6
6	September 29, 1928	Oxford, Mississippi	Ole Miss	25–0
7	November 13, 1937	Memphis, Tennessee	#20 Arkansas	32–6
8	November 16, 1938	Memphis, Tennessee	Ole Miss	20–14
9	October 26, 1940	Memphis, Tennessee	Arkansas	21–20
10	November 22, 1941	Memphis, Tennessee	Ole Miss	18–0
11	October 24, 1942	Memphis, Tennessee	Arkansas	7–6
12	October 28, 1944	Memphis, Tennessee	Arkansas	26–18
13	October 27, 1945	Memphis, Tennessee	Arkansas	19–0
14	October 26, 1946	Memphis, Tennessee	Ole Miss	9–0
15	October 25, 1947	Memphis, Tennessee	Arkansas	19–14
16	October 25, 1952	Little Rock, Arkansas	Ole Miss	34–7
17	October 24, 1953	Memphis, Tennessee	Ole Miss	28–0
18	October 23, 1954	Little Rock, Arkansas	#7 Arkansas	6–0
19	October 22, 1955	Oxford, Mississippi	Ole Miss	17–7
20	October 27, 1956	Little Rock, Arkansas	Arkansas	14–0
21	October 26, 1957	Memphis, Tennessee	Arkansas	12–6
22	October 25, 1958	Little Rock, Arkansas	#6 Ole Miss	14–12
23	October 24, 1959	Memphis, Tennessee	#4 Ole Miss	28–0
24	October 22, 1960	Little Rock, Arkansas	#2 Ole Miss	10–7
25	September 23, 1961	Jackson, Mississippi	#9 Ole Miss	16–0
26	January 1, 1963	New Orleans, Louisiana	#3 Ole Miss	13–7
27	January 1, 1970	New Orleans, Louisiana	#13 Ole Miss	27–22
28	September 26, 1981	Jackson, Mississippi	Arkansas	27–13
29	September 25, 1982	Little Rock, Arkansas	#9 Arkansas	14–12
30	September 24, 1983	Jackson, Mississippi	Ole Miss	13–10
31	September 15, 1984	Little Rock, Arkansas	Tie	14–14
32	September 14, 1985	Jackson, Mississippi	#14 Arkansas	24–19
33	September 13, 1986	Little Rock, Arkansas	#18 Arkansas	21–0
34	September 12, 1987	Jackson, Mississippi	#13 Arkansas	31–10
35	September 17, 1988	Little Rock, Arkansas	Arkansas	21–13
36	September 23, 1989	Jackson, Mississippi	#8 Arkansas	24–17
37	September 22, 1990	Little Rock, Arkansas	Ole Miss	21–17

No.	Date	Location	Winner	Score
38	September 28, 1991	Jackson, Mississippi	Ole Miss	24–17
39	October 17, 1992	Little Rock, Arkansas	Ole Miss	17–3
40	October 16, 1993	Jackson, Mississippi	Ole Miss	19–0
41	October 15, 1994	Fayetteville, Arkansas	Arkansas	31–7
42	October 14, 1995	Memphis, Tennessee	Arkansas	13–6
43	November 9, 1996	Fayetteville, Arkansas	Arkansas	13–7
44	November 6, 1997	Oxford, Mississippi	Ole Miss	19–9
45	November 7, 1998	Fayetteville, Arkansas	#11 Arkansas	34–0
46	November 6, 1999	Oxford, Mississippi	#23 Ole Miss	38–16
47	November 4, 2000	Fayetteville, Arkansas	Ole Miss	38–24
48	November 3, 2001	Oxford, Mississippi	Arkansas	58–56 ^{7OT}
49	October 26, 2002	Fayetteville, Arkansas	Arkansas	48–28
50	October 25, 2003	Oxford, Mississippi	Ole Miss	19–7
51	November 13, 2004	Fayetteville, Arkansas	Arkansas	35–3
52	November 12, 2005	Oxford, Mississippi	Arkansas	28–17
53	October 21, 2006	Fayetteville, Arkansas	#15 Arkansas	38–3
54	October 20, 2007	Oxford, Mississippi	Arkansas	44–8
55	October 25, 2008	Fayetteville, Arkansas	Ole Miss	23–21
56	October 24, 2009	Oxford, Mississippi	Ole Miss	30–17
57	October 23, 2010	Fayetteville, Arkansas	#21 Arkansas	38–24
58	October 22, 2011	Oxford, Mississippi	#10 Arkansas	29–24
59	October 27, 2012	Little Rock, Arkansas	Ole Miss‡	30–27
60	November 9, 2013	Oxford, Mississippi	Ole Miss‡	34–24
61	November 22, 2014	Fayetteville, Arkansas	Arkansas	30–0
62	November 7, 2015	Oxford, Mississippi	Arkansas	53–52 ^{OT}
63	October 15, 2016	Fayetteville, Arkansas	#22 Arkansas	34–30
64	October 28, 2017	Oxford, Mississippi	Arkansas	38–37
65	October 13, 2018	Little Rock, Arkansas	Ole Miss	37–33
66	September 7, 2019	Oxford, Mississippi	Ole Miss	31–17
67	October 17, 2020	Fayetteville, Arkansas	Arkansas	33–21
68	October 9, 2021	Oxford, Mississippi	#17 Ole Miss	52–51
69	November 19, 2022	Fayetteville, Arkansas	Arkansas	42–27
70	October 7, 2023	Oxford, Mississippi	#16 Ole Miss	27–20
71	November 2, 2024	Fayetteville, Arkansas	#19 Ole Miss	63–31
72	September 13, 2025	Oxford, Mississippi	#17 Ole Miss	41–35
Series: Arkansas leads 37–32–1
† Arkansas claims Ole Miss used an ineligible player and considers this a forfeit. ‡ Ole Miss vacated wins as part of NCAA penalties.

== Notable games ==
=== 1908 – First Meeting ===
Arkansas 33 – Ole Miss 0

The very first meeting between the two teams was a 1908 contest in which Arkansas won 33–0. The teams were first scheduled to meet each other in 1906, but due to a cancellation, the 1908 contest was the first meeting.

=== 1914 – Contentious result ===
Arkansas lists the 1914 contest as a forfeit by Ole Miss because Ole Miss used an ineligible player. Ole Miss denies the allegation of using an ineligible player and therefore lists the contest by the recorded on the field winning score of 13–7 in favor of Ole Miss. Therefore, the two school's official records for the overall series shows a one-game difference.

=== 1954 – Powder River Pass ===
Arkansas 6 – Ole Miss 0

Arkansas and Ole Miss met in War Memorial Stadium on October 23, 1954. The game was scoreless until the Razorbacks called a trick play: a 66-yard halfback pass from halfback Buddy Bob Benson to Preston Carpenter for the only points of the game. Arkansas head coach Bowden Wyatt named the play after the Powder River, a river in his native Wyoming. The river is a mile wide but deceptively only a foot deep. With the 6–0 win, Arkansas would go on to fall in the 1955 Cotton Bowl Classic against Bobby Dodd's Georgia Tech, and the Rebels would continue to the 1955 Sugar Bowl, losing to Navy.

=== 1959 ===
Ole Miss 28 – Arkansas 0

The 1959 contest was won by Ole Miss 28–0 in Memphis, Tennessee on their way to a final record of 10–1 for the 1959 season and one of their three claimed national championships.

=== 1960 ===
Ole Miss 10 – Arkansas 7

The 1960 contest between the teams was won by Ole Miss 10–7 at War Memorial Stadium in Little Rock, Arkansas, on their way to a final record of 10–0–1 for the 1960 season and the second of their three claimed national championships. Sometimes called the Tommy Bell game by Arkansas fans, he called a timeout in an attempt to quiet Razorback fans. Rebel Allen Green did not hear the whistle and kicked the ball through the uprights. After the timeout, fans swear Bell signaled that the kick was good as soon as Green connected with the ball. Fans also swear that the kick was no good. Fighting broke out all around the stadium and because of this, the annual series between the two schools was played the next year in Jackson and then canceled until the two teams renewed the series in 1981.

=== 1963 — Sugar Bowl ===
	1	2	3	4	Total
Razorbacks	0	3	10	0	13
Rebels	3	7	7	0	17

Ole Miss 17 – Arkansas 13

The January 1, 1963 Sugar Bowl in New Orleans was played between the two teams as an end to the 1962 regular season. It was both the Razorbacks' and Rebels' fourth bowl in four seasons, and was the second straight Sugar Bowl for Arkansas.

After each team kicked field goals, Ole Miss scored the first touchdown, a 33-yard strike from Glynn Griffing to Louis Guy gave the Rebels a 10–3 lead. The Hogs replied with a five-yard touchdown toss from Billy Moore to knot the game at 10. Ole Miss QB Griffing then scored on a one-yard touchdown scamper. The Razorbacks tacked on a field goal, but neither team could dent the scoreboard in the fourth quarter. Ole Miss won the game 17–13 to finish the season 10–0 and win a share of the 1962 national championship in college football. This is the last of three national championships Ole Miss claims.

Scoring summary

Quarter	Time	Drive			Team	Scoring information	Score	
Quarter	Time	Plays	Yards	TOP	Team	Scoring information	ARK	UM
2			80		UM	30-yard field goal by Irwin	0	3
2			82		ARK	30-yard field goal by Tom McKnelly	3	3
2			67		UM	Louis Guy 33-yard touchdown reception from Glynn Griffing, Irwin kick good	3	10
3			15		ARK	Jesse Branch 5-yard touchdown reception from Billy Moore, Tom McKnelly kick good	10	10
3			80		UM	Glynn Griffing 1-yard touchdown run, Irwin kick good	10	17
3			59		ARK	22-yard field goal by Tom McKnelly	13	17
"TOP" = time of possession. For other American football terms, see Glossary of American football.							13	17

=== 2001 – Record 7-Overtime Game ===
	1	2	3	4	OT	2OT	3OT	4OT	5OT	6OT	7OT	Total
Razorbacks	0	7	3	7	7	0	6	6	6	8	8	58
Rebels	7	0	3	7	7	0	6	6	6	8	6	56

Arkansas 58 – Ole Miss 56 (7OT)

On November 3, 2001, Arkansas and Ole Miss played in an NCAA record 7-overtime game in Oxford, Mississippi. The marathon game featured 114 points, 988 offensive yards, four 100-yard rushers, and seven overtimes, with Arkansas prevailing 58–56. The game started slowly, however, with a 7–7 tie going into halftime. Arkansas completed a field goal attempt in the third quarter, giving the Hogs a 10–7 edge. A tying 32-yard field goal attempt was then set up by Eli Manning. Razorback fullback Mark Pierce ran in from one yard away to take a 17–10 Arkansas lead in the fourth quarter, but Eli Manning connected with Jamie Armstead to send the game into overtime.

Razorback RB Cedric Cobbs scored from 16 yards out to start the overtime scoring. Eli Manning responded with an 11-yard touchdown pass, sending the game to a second overtime, in which neither team would score. Matt Jones scrambled all 25 yards for the go-ahead touchdown, but the two point run failed. Ole Miss drove to the one-yard line, where Joe Gunn ran in. Given a chance to end the game by completing the two-point conversion, Eli Manning threw the ball, but it was incomplete, sending the game to its fourth extra frame. Rebel receiver Bill Flowers hauled in a 21-yard pass from Manning to take the lead, 36–30. After the Rebels failed the two point pass, Jones threw a 24-yard TD pass to George Wilson. The Hogs would fail the two point run, extending the game to a fifth overtime. Jones again scored for the Razorbacks, an 8-yard rush, but failed the two-point conversion. Manning hit his tight end Doug Zeigler from twelve yards out, and failed the two point pass. In the sixth overtime, Zeigler again caught a Manning aerial, and Ole Miss connected on the two-point conversion with a Charles Stackhouse rush, taking a 50–42 lead. Razorback Pierce ran in from two yards out, and Arkansas completed the tying two-point conversion on a Jones pass. The game would go to a seventh overtime.

Mark Pierce again ran in for a two-yard touchdown (his third two-yard score of the game), and Decori Birmingham would receive the two point pass from Jones, making it a 58–50 Hog lead. Manning would throw his sixth touchdown pass, but the two point pass to Doug Ziegler was stopped by Jermaine Petty, giving Arkansas a 58–56 win over rival Ole Miss.

The two teams combined for 60 first downs, 130 rushing attempts (80 from the Razorbacks), 68 pass attempts, and 198 total offensive plays, while limiting mistakes, including two fumbles, eight penalties, and one sack.

The win moved Arkansas to 5–3 on the year and 3–0 in overtime. Arkansas would play another seven-overtime game in 2003 at Kentucky, which Arkansas won with a final score of 71–63. Arkansas finished with 531 yards of offense, 370 rushing and 161 passing, while Ole Miss netted 457 yards of offense, 312 passing and 166 rushing.

=== 2008 – Houston Nutt's first return to Arkansas ===
	1	2	3	4	Total
Rebels	3	10	0	10	23
Razorbacks	0	7	0	14	21

Ole Miss 23 – Arkansas 21

On October 25, 2008, Ole Miss returned to Donald W. Reynolds Razorback Stadium in Fayetteville, Arkansas for the 55th meeting between the two programs. This was the first game between Ole Miss and Arkansas with former Razorback head coach Houston Nutt as the head coach of the Rebels. Ole Miss won the game by a score of 23 to 21. This was the Rebels' first win in the series since 2003.

=== 2011 – Houston Nutt's last stand ===
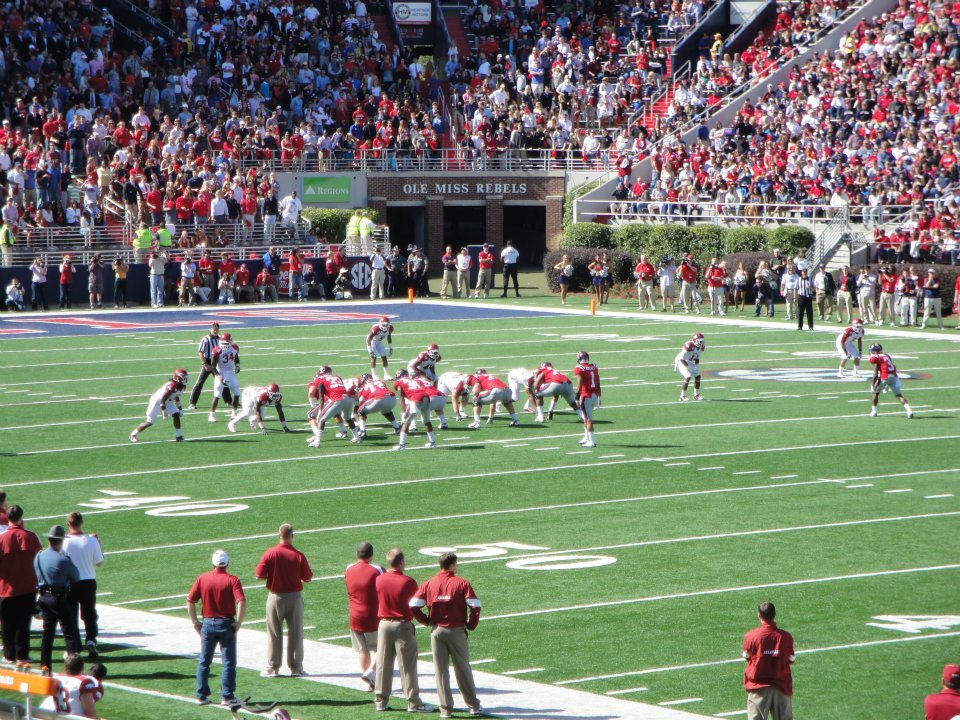
Ole Miss on offense during the game

	1	2	3	4	Total
Razorbacks	0	7	19	3	29
Rebels	3	14	0	7	24

Arkansas 29 – Ole Miss 24

When the two teams met on October 22, 2011, in Oxford, they seemed to be heading in different directions. Arkansas was ranked in the top ten, fresh off two top-15 victories, while the Rebels were winless in the SEC with coach Houston Nutt on the hot seat. The Rebels, however, surprised the Razorbacks by opening up a 17–0 lead in the second quarter behind quarterback Randall Mackey. A late touchdown brought Arkansas to within 10 points.

The Razorbacks continued in the third quarter with a 19–0 scoring run, including two touchdown runs by quarterback Tyler Wilson and a safety; the Razorbacks were up 26–17. Arkansas added a field goal in the fourth quarter before the Rebels rallied: Ole Miss closed within 29–24 late in the game and was able to recover an onside kick. The Rebels's chance of a winning touchdown was thwarted with Eric Bennett's interception of Randall Mackey with little time remaining, sealing the win for Arkansas. Arkansas moved up to 6–1 (2–1 SEC) while Ole Miss fell to 2–5 (0–4 SEC).

The win was Arkansas's second in a row in the series, and it was Houston Nutt's final game against his former team. He was fired at the end of the 2011 season.

=== 2015 – Fourth and 25 ===
	1	2	3	4	OT	Total
Razorbacks	7	10	14	14	8	53
Rebels	7	10	14	14	7	52

Arkansas 53 – Ole Miss 52

The November 7, 2015, contest in Oxford between the two teams was a hard-fought offensive battle in which Arkansas largely abandoned its previous ground-and-pound style for a more pass-intensive offensive philosophy in which quarterback Brandon Allen threw for a career-high 442 yards and six touchdowns. Arkansas and Ole Miss scored exactly the same in each of the individual four quarters of regulation time leading up to overtime. In overtime, Arkansas won the coin toss and elected to play defense first, leading to Ole Miss scoring the first overtime touchdown.

After the Ole Miss touchdown, and while on defense, Arkansas kept the game from ending on a fourth-and-25 play in which quarterback Brandon Allen completed a pass to Hunter Henry, who saw that he was going to be tackled, and flung the ball backwards as a lateral towards running back Alex Collins. Collins picked it up on the bounce at the line of scrimmage and ran it for a 31-yard gain to gain a first down, fumbling it at the end of the play, but it was recovered by teammate Dominique Reed. Head coach Bret Bielema called the play "divine intervention." The uniqueness of the play led to widespread media attention and replays.

After Arkansas scored an ensuing touchdown, they chose to go for two, even though overtime rules do not require a two-point conversion attempt until the 3rd overtime. The first attempt appeared to result in a quarterback sack and a victory for the Rebels, but Ole Miss' Marquis Haynes was called for an obvious face-mask penalty, which gave the Razorbacks another chance. On the next play, Arkansas quarterback Brandon Allen ran it into the end zone.

The win moved Arkansas one game closer to eventual bowl eligibility. For Ole Miss, the loss meant they no longer controlled their own destiny in the SEC West for the 2015 season as they had previously coming into the game. The loss cost Ole Miss the SEC West championship and a trip to Atlanta, Georgia for the SEC Championship game. It also meant that later that night, the winner of the LSU vs. Alabama game would have control of the SEC West; Alabama would go on to win that game 30–16 and won out, thus securing the SEC West title and a trip to Atlanta for the SEC Championship game. Since Alabama was selected for the College Football Playoff, Ole Miss was selected as the SEC's representative for the Sugar Bowl, a game in which they won 48–20 over Oklahoma State.

The play is also referred to as the "Swine Intervention", the "Henry Heave", or the "Oh Henry".

=== 2016 − Battle Between Ranked Teams ===
	1	2	3	4	Total
Rebels	6	14	0	10	30
Razorbacks	14	6	7	7	34

No. 22 Arkansas 34 – No. 12 Ole Miss 30

The 2016 meeting between the two teams was the first between the two when both were ranked since 1970. Ole Miss was looking for a measure of revenge after the previous season's overtime loss to Arkansas, which effectively knocked the Rebels out of contention for the SEC Championship Game. But Arkansas quarterback Austin Allen, younger brother of former Hog QB Brandon Allen, engineered a solid offense for the Razorbacks all game long. Allen was helped by sophomore running back Rawleigh Williams III's 180 yards rushing, and a strong performance from Arkansas' defense, which held Ole Miss to a season low 30 points, and kept QB Chad Kelly from amassing his 2015 offensive totals. The game was tied 20–20 at halftime, but Arkansas scored the only points of the third quarter, and held a 27–20 lead in the fourth. Kelly lead Ole Miss to ten unanswered points, and the Rebels took the lead with nine minutes to play. After the teams traded punts, Allen guided the Hogs down the field, and receiver Jared Cornelius scored on a six-yard end around play, to give Arkansas back the lead, 34–30, with only two minutes and twenty seconds to play. After Arkansas defensive lineman Jeremiah Ledbetter sacked Kelly on third down, and the Rebels were penalized five yards for a false start, it was fourth down and sixteen, with the game on the line. Kelly took the snap, rolled left, and tucked the ball to try and run for the first down. It appeared that Kelley had the first, but he was hit hard by Arkansas safety Santos Ramirez, and the ball popped out of Kelly's grasp and rolled out of bounds behind the line to gain. That turned over the ball to the Razorbacks, and Austin Allen took a knee on three plays to run out the clock. It was Arkansas' third consecutive victory over Ole Miss.

=== 2021 − Battle Between Ranked Teams II ===
	1	2	3	4	Total
Razorbacks	7	7	17	20	51
Rebels	0	21	10	21	52

No. 13 Arkansas 51 – No. 17 Ole Miss 52

The 2021 matchup was the first since 2016 in which both teams were ranked. Ole Miss was ranked #17 coming off of a 42–21 loss to Alabama the week before, while Arkansas was ranked #13 coming off of a humiliating 37–0 shutout defeat at the hands of 2nd-ranked Georgia in Athens. The game, which took place during Ole Miss' Homecoming Weekend, proved to be a high-scoring affair for the entire duration, as both teams traded touchdowns and neither team had a lead of greater than 10 points. At the end of the game, Arkansas had scored a touchdown as time expired to make it 52–51 Ole Miss, but instead of going for the extra point to force overtime, Sam Pittman elected to go for 2 points. This caused Ole Miss fans to become very anxious, as this was the exact same score as the 2015 game (the only difference being that that game went to overtime), where a successful 2-point attempt from Arkansas kept Ole Miss from winning the SEC West and going to the SEC Championship in Atlanta (While Ole Miss defeated Alabama 43–37 in Tuscaloosa, they had 2 conference losses compared to Alabama's one loss to them). Ole Miss however was successfully able to stop the 2-point attempt and won 52–51. The Rebels would go on to finish 10–3 (6–2 in the SEC) and lost to Baylor 21–7 in the Sugar Bowl, finishing #11 in the rankings. Arkansas finished 9–4 (4–4 in the SEC), and won the Outback Bowl 24–10 over Penn State while finishing #21 in the rankings. Arkansas got revenge in the 2022 matchup, winning 42–27 in Fayetteville to upset the #14 Rebels after being up by as much as 42–6 in the 3rd quarter. The Razorbacks and Rebels both had disappointing seasons, however. Arkansas was picked to finish 3rd in the SEC West and climbed up to #10 following a 3–0 start, but lost their next 3 games to Texas A&M, Alabama, and Mississippi State and finished 7–6, although they did win the Liberty Bowl in a 55–53 triple-overtime shootout against Kansas to get their 2nd bowl win in a row under Coach Pittman. Ole Miss was predicted to finish 4th in the SEC West but started out 7–0 and actually led the division after Alabama lost to Tennessee. But they couldn't sustain their momentum and lost to LSU on the road by a score of 45–20. The Rebels still had a chance to win the division with a home win over Alabama and wins over Arkansas and Mississippi State plus another conference loss by LSU, but they lost to all 3 and finished 8–5 following their Texas Bowl loss to Texas Tech.

== See also ==
- List of NCAA college football rivalry games
