= 1962 Kentucky Wildcats football team =

American college football season

1962 Kentucky Wildcats football
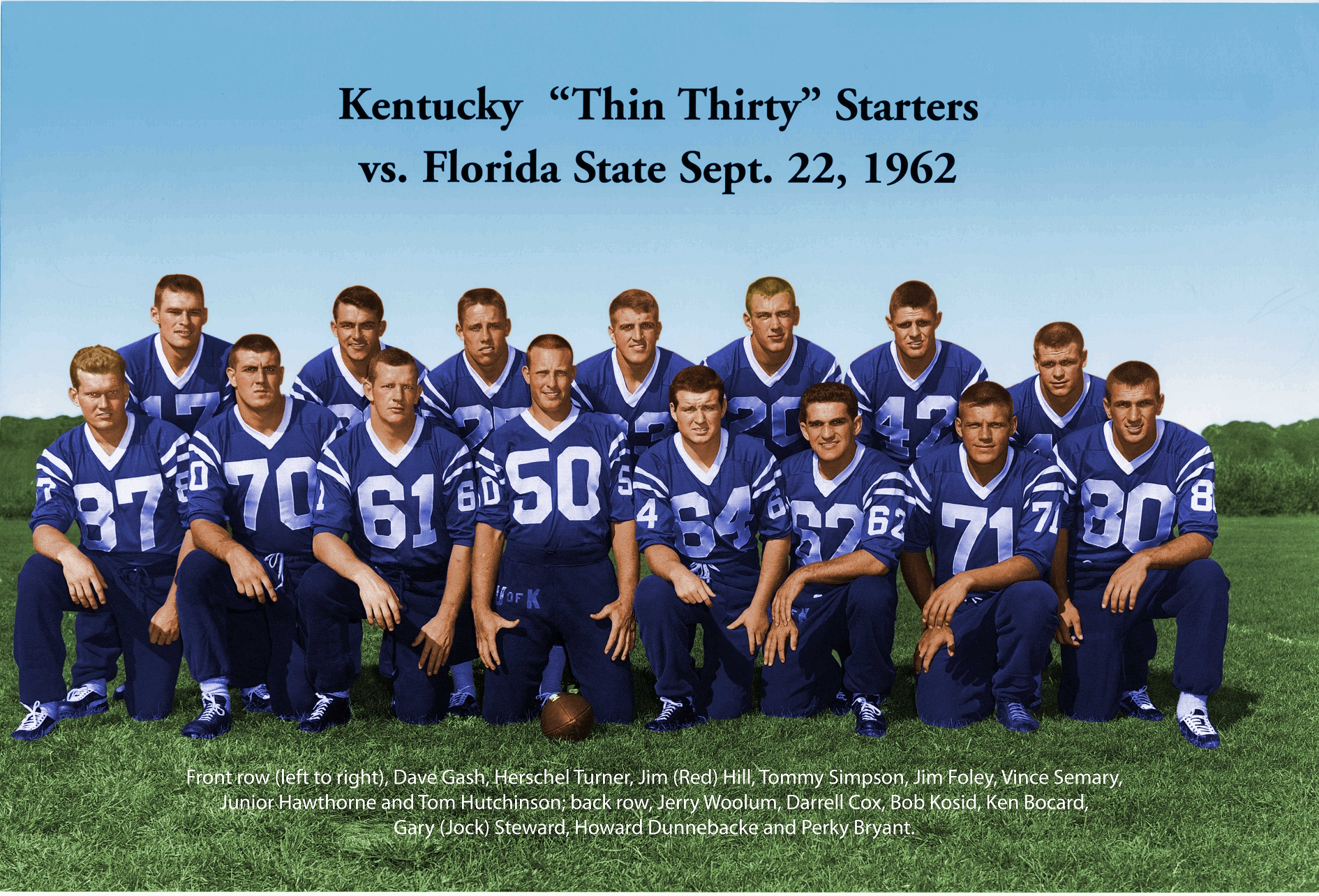
- Kentucky's "Thin Thirty" starting line-up, September 22, 1962
- Conference: Southeastern Conference
- Record: 3–5–2 (2–3–1 SEC)
- Head coach: Charlie Bradshaw (1st season)
- Home stadium: McLean Stadium

1962 Southeastern Conference football standings
	Conf.					Overall
Team	W		L		T	W		L		T
No. 3 Ole Miss $	6	–	0	–	0	10	–	0	–	0
No. 5 Alabama	6	–	1	–	0	10	–	1	–	0
No. 7 LSU	5	–	1	–	0	9	–	1	–	1
Georgia Tech	5	–	2	–	0	7	–	3	–	1
Florida	4	–	2	–	0	7	–	4	–	0
Auburn	4	–	3	–	0	6	–	3	–	1
Georgia	2	–	3	–	1	3	–	4	–	3
Kentucky	2	–	3	–	1	3	–	5	–	2
Mississippi State	2	–	5	–	0	3	–	6	–	0
Tennessee	2	–	6	–	0	4	–	6	–	0
Vanderbilt	1	–	6	–	0	1	–	9	–	0
Tulane	0	–	7	–	0	0	–	10	–	0
$ – Conference champion; Rankings from AP Poll

The 1962 Kentucky Wildcats football team represented the University of Kentucky in the Southeastern Conference during the 1962 NCAA University Division football season. Coached by Charlie Bradshaw, a Bear Bryant disciple, the team was thinned by his brutal methods from 88 players to just 30. The team was thus known as the Thin Thirty. While the team's record was just 3–5–2, it did include a dramatic victory in the season finale against Tennessee in Knoxville, 12–10. The winning margin was provided by a field goal by Clarkie Mayfield, one of the heroes of the game, who later died in the Beverly Hills Supper Club fire on May 28, 1977.

Players on the Kentucky team included Tom Hutchinson, Dale Lindsey, and Herschel Turner, all of whom later played in the NFL. Bob Kosid and Junior Hawthorne later played in the CFL. Two assistant coaches on the 1962 Kentucky staff, Leeman Bennett and Chuck Knox, later had success as NFL head coaches. Assistants Homer Rice (Cincinnati Bengals, University of Cincinnati and Rice University), Bud Moore (Kansas University) and Dave Hart (University of Pittsburgh) were all later head coaches. Lindsey went on to become a successful NFL assistant coach, working with the Chicago Bears.

== Schedule ==
Date	Opponent	Site	Result	Attendance	Source
September 22	Florida State*	McLean Stadium; Lexington, KY	T 0–0	34,000	
September 29	at No. 7 Ole Miss	Mississippi Veterans Memorial Stadium; Jackson, MS	L 0–14	42,000	
October 6	Auburn	McLean Stadium; Lexington, KY	L 6–16	33,500	
October 12	at Detroit*	University of Detroit Stadium; Detroit, MI	W 27–8	14,548	
October 20	No. 4 LSU	McLean Stadium; Lexington, KY	L 0–7	37,000	
October 27	at Georgia	Sanford Stadium; Athens, GA	T 7–7	32,000	
November 2	at Miami (FL)*	Miami Orange Bowl; Miami, FL	L 17–25	43,614	
November 10	Vanderbilt	McLean Stadium; Lexington, KY (rivalry)	W 7–0	26,000	
November 17	Xavier*	McLean Stadium; Lexington, KY	L 9–14	20,000	
November 24	at Tennessee	Shields–Watkins Field; Knoxville, TN (rivalry)	W 12–10	34,172	
*Non-conference game; Rankings from AP Poll released prior to the game

== Book ==
The 1962 Kentucky football team is the subject of a book, The Thin Thirty, by Shannon Ragland, published in August, 2007. The focus of the book is the '62 roster of players under first-year coach Charlie Bradshaw—a Bear Bryant disciple—who ended up thinning the team from 88 to 30 players via his brutal conditioning tactics and exploitation of players. It places this in the backdrop of racial and economic tensions of the South and its impact on several players.

The book asserts that several members of the 1962 team became involved in a gay sex scandal involving actor Rock Hudson, and that a crucial game was fixed that year. It then finished by following up with what happened to the players afterward.

=== Reception ===
The Thin Thirty received reviews in several publications, including the Voice-Tribune, the Charleston Post & Courier, the Louisville Courier-Journal and by Professor Weldon Johnson, the author of Chokehold.

Jon Johnston from CornNation praises the research and epilogue, but finds the back story at 100-pages was long, the writing was redundant at times, and the assertion of the Xavier game being fixed without evidence "damages the credibility" of the book.
