= 1962 Vanderbilt Commodores football team =

American college football season

1962 Vanderbilt Commodores football
- Conference: Southeastern Conference
- Record: 1–9 (1–6 SEC)
- Head coach: Art Guepe (10th season)
- Home stadium: Dudley Field

1962 Southeastern Conference football standings
	Conf.					Overall
Team	W		L		T	W		L		T
No. 3 Ole Miss $	6	–	0	–	0	10	–	0	–	0
No. 5 Alabama	6	–	1	–	0	10	–	1	–	0
No. 7 LSU	5	–	1	–	0	9	–	1	–	1
Georgia Tech	5	–	2	–	0	7	–	3	–	1
Florida	4	–	2	–	0	7	–	4	–	0
Auburn	4	–	3	–	0	6	–	3	–	1
Georgia	2	–	3	–	1	3	–	4	–	3
Kentucky	2	–	3	–	1	3	–	5	–	2
Mississippi State	2	–	5	–	0	3	–	6	–	0
Tennessee	2	–	6	–	0	4	–	6	–	0
Vanderbilt	1	–	6	–	0	1	–	9	–	0
Tulane	0	–	7	–	0	0	–	10	–	0
$ – Conference champion; Rankings from AP Poll

The 1962 Vanderbilt Commodores football team represented Vanderbilt University as a member of the Southeastern Conference (SEC) during the 1962 NCAA University Division football season. Led by Art Guepe in his tenth and final season as head coach, the Commodores compiled an overall record of 1–9 with a mark of 1–6 conference play, placing 11th in the SEC.

== Schedule ==
Date	Opponent	Site	Result	Attendance	Source
September 22	at West Virginia*	Mountaineer Field; Morgantown, WV	L 0–26	24,000	
September 29	Georgia	Dudley Field; Nashville, TN (rivalry)	L 0–10	18,000	
October 6	at No. 2 Alabama	Legion Field; Birmingham, AL	L 7–17	40,000	
October 13	The Citadel*	Dudley Field; Nashville, TN	L 6–21	14,000	
October 20	at Florida	Florida Field; Gainesville, FL	L 7–42	42,000	
October 27	vs. No. 7 Ole Miss	Crump Stadium; Memphis, TN (rivalry)	L 0–35	16,262	
November 3	Boston College*	Dudley Field; Nashville, TN	L 22–27	11,000	
November 10	at Kentucky	McLean Stadium; Lexington, KY (rivalry)	L 0–7	26,000	
November 17	Tulane	Dudley Field; Nashville, TN	W 20–0	12,000	
December 1	Tennessee	Dudley Field; Nashville, TN (rivalry)	L 0–30	37,166	
*Non-conference game; Rankings from AP Poll released prior to the game
