= 1962 Tulane Green Wave football team =

American college football season

1962 Tulane Green Wave football
- Conference: Southeastern Conference
- Record: 0–10 (0–7 SEC)
- Head coach: Tommy O'Boyle (1st season)
- Home stadium: Tulane Stadium

1962 Southeastern Conference football standings
	Conf.					Overall
Team	W		L		T	W		L		T
No. 3 Ole Miss $	6	–	0	–	0	10	–	0	–	0
No. 5 Alabama	6	–	1	–	0	10	–	1	–	0
No. 7 LSU	5	–	1	–	0	9	–	1	–	1
Georgia Tech	5	–	2	–	0	7	–	3	–	1
Florida	4	–	2	–	0	7	–	4	–	0
Auburn	4	–	3	–	0	6	–	3	–	1
Georgia	2	–	3	–	1	3	–	4	–	3
Kentucky	2	–	3	–	1	3	–	5	–	2
Mississippi State	2	–	5	–	0	3	–	6	–	0
Tennessee	2	–	6	–	0	4	–	6	–	0
Vanderbilt	1	–	6	–	0	1	–	9	–	0
Tulane	0	–	7	–	0	0	–	10	–	0
$ – Conference champion; Rankings from AP Poll

The 1962 Tulane Green Wave football team was an American football team that represented Tulane University during the 1962 NCAA University Division football season as a member of the Southeastern Conference (SEC). In its first year under head coach Tommy O'Boyle, Tulane compiled an 0–10 record (0–7 in conference games), and was outscored by a total of 293 to 76.

The team gained an average of 96.6 rushing yards and 106.2 passing yards per game. On defense, it gave up an average of 218.8 rushing yards and 102.0 passing yards per game. Tulane's individual leaders included Ted Miller with 548 passing yards, Jerry Graves with 200 rushing yards, and Clem Dellenger with 375 receiving yards.

The Green Wave played its home games at Tulane Stadium in New Orleans.

== Schedule ==
Date	Opponent	Site	Result	Attendance	Source
September 21	Stanford*	Tulane Stadium; New Orleans, LA	L 3–6	31,000	
September 28	No. 1 Alabama	Tulane Stadium; New Orleans, LA	L 6–44	40,000	
October 6	at No. 3 Texas*	Texas Memorial Stadium; Austin, TX	L 8–35	50,000	
October 12	Mississippi State	Tulane Stadium; New Orleans, LA	L 6–35		
October 20	at No. 5 Ole Miss	Mississippi Veterans Memorial Stadium; Jackson, MS (rivalry)	L 0–21	23,000	
October 27	at Georgia Tech	Grant Field; Atlanta, GA	L 12–42	46,370	
November 3	Virginia Tech*	Tulane Stadium; New Orleans, LA	L 22–24	18,000	
November 10	at Tennessee	Shields–Watkins Field; Knoxville, TN	L 16–28	19,965	
November 17	at Vanderbilt	Dudley Field; Nashville, TN	L 0–20	12,000	
November 24	No. 8 LSU	Tulane Stadium; New Orleans, LA (Battle for the Rag)	L 3–38	41,000	
*Non-conference game; Rankings from AP Poll released prior to the game
