= 1962 Alabama Crimson Tide football team =

American college football season

1962 Alabama Crimson Tide football

Orange Bowl champion

Orange Bowl, W 17–0 vs. Oklahoma
- Conference: Southeastern Conference

Ranking
- Coaches: No. 5
- AP: No. 5
- Record: 10–1 (6–1 SEC)
- Head coach: Bear Bryant (5th season)
- Offensive coordinator: Howard Schnellenberger (2nd season)
- Defensive coordinator: Gene Stallings (1st season)
- Captains: Lee Roy Jordan; Jimmy Sharpe
- Home stadium: Denny Stadium; Legion Field

1962 Southeastern Conference football standings
	Conf.					Overall
Team	W		L		T	W		L		T
No. 3 Ole Miss $	6	–	0	–	0	10	–	0	–	0
No. 5 Alabama	6	–	1	–	0	10	–	1	–	0
No. 7 LSU	5	–	1	–	0	9	–	1	–	1
Georgia Tech	5	–	2	–	0	7	–	3	–	1
Florida	4	–	2	–	0	7	–	4	–	0
Auburn	4	–	3	–	0	6	–	3	–	1
Georgia	2	–	3	–	1	3	–	4	–	3
Kentucky	2	–	3	–	1	3	–	5	–	2
Mississippi State	2	–	5	–	0	3	–	6	–	0
Tennessee	2	–	6	–	0	4	–	6	–	0
Vanderbilt	1	–	6	–	0	1	–	9	–	0
Tulane	0	–	7	–	0	0	–	10	–	0
$ – Conference champion; Rankings from AP Poll

The 1962 Alabama Crimson Tide football team (variously "Alabama", "UA" or "Bama") represented the University of Alabama in the 1962 NCAA University Division football season. It was the Crimson Tide's 68th overall and 29th season as a member of the Southeastern Conference (SEC). The team was led by head coach Bear Bryant, in his fifth year, and played their home games at Denny Stadium in Tuscaloosa and Legion Field in Birmingham, Alabama. They finished season with ten wins and one loss (10–1 overall, 6–1 in the SEC) and with a victory over Oklahoma in the Orange Bowl.

The Crimson Tide opened the season with a win over Georgia at Legion Field in Birmingham in week one, and then defeated Tulane in their first road game at New Orleans in week two. Alabama then defeated Vanderbilt in the second Legion Field game of the season and Houston back at Denny Stadium before they defeated Tennessee at Neyland Stadium.

The Crimson Tide then defeated Tulsa, Mississippi State and then Miami on homecoming in Tuscaloosa that extended their winning streak to 19-games and their unbeaten streak to 26-games. The next week Alabama lost their first game since the 1960 season when they were upset 7–6 by Georgia Tech at Atlanta. They rebounded with wins over Auburn in the Iron Bowl that closed the regular season and against Oklahoma in the Orange Bowl.

== Schedule ==
Date	Opponent	Rank	Site	TV	Result	Attendance	Source
September 22	Georgia	No. 3	Legion Field; Birmingham, AL (rivalry)		W 35–0	54,000	
September 28	at Tulane	No. 1	Tulane Stadium; New Orleans, LA		W 44–6	40,000	
October 6	Vanderbilt	No. 2	Legion Field; Birmingham, AL		W 17–7	40,000	
October 13	Houston*	No. 1	Denny Stadium; Tuscaloosa, AL		W 14–3	30,000	
October 20	at Tennessee	No. 2	Neyland Stadium; Knoxville, TN (Third Saturday in October)	ABC	W 27–7	44,600	
October 27	Tulsa*	No. 2	Denny Stadium; Tuscaloosa, AL		W 35–6	25,000	
November 3	at Mississippi State	No. 2	Scott Field; Starkville, MS (rivalry)		W 20–0	26,000	
November 10	Miami (FL)*^{†}	No. 3	Denny Stadium; Tuscaloosa, AL		W 36–3	43,200	
November 17	at Georgia Tech	No. 1	Grant Field; Atlanta, GA (rivalry)		L 6–7	52,971	
December 1	vs. Auburn	No. 5	Legion Field; Birmingham, AL (Iron Bowl)		W 38–0	54,000	
January 1, 1963	vs. No. 8 Oklahoma*	No. 5	Miami Orange Bowl; Miami, FL (Orange Bowl)	NBC	W 17–0	72,880	
*Non-conference game; ^{†}Homecoming; Rankings from AP Poll released prior to the game

== Game summaries ==
=== Georgia ===
Team	1	2	3	4	Total
Georgia	0	0	0	0	0
• #3 Alabama	9	6	6	14	35

- Date: September 22
- Location: Legion Field
  Birmingham, AL
- Game attendance: 54,000

To open the 1962 season, the Crimson Tide shutout the Georgia Bulldogs 35–0 in what was the first start for quarterback Joe Namath with the Crimson Tide varsity squad. Alabama scored their first points of the season in the opening four minutes of the game when Namath threw a 52-yard touchdown pass to Richard Williamson. They then extended their lead to 9–0 late in the quarter when Jake Saye was tackled for a safety by Larry Morten on a failed punt attempt. Namath further extended the Crimson Tide lead to 21–0 in the third quarter before he was sat by Coach Bryant late in the third. He threw a pair of touchdown passes to Cotton Clark, in the second on a ten-yard pass and in the third on a 12-yard pass. Alabama then closed the game with fourth-quarter touchdown runs of four-yards by Clark and 25-yards by Hudson Harris that made the final score 35–0.

=== Tulane ===
Team	1	2	3	4	Total
• #1 Alabama	14	22	0	8	44
Tulane	0	6	0	0	6

- Date: September 28
- Location: Tulane Stadium
  New Orleans, LA
- Game attendance: 40,000

After their victory over Georgia to open the season, Alabama up two spots in the AP Poll to the No. 1 position. On a Friday evening at New Orleans, the Crimson Tide defeated the Tulane Green Wave 44–6 in their first road game of the season. Alabama took a 14–0 first quarter lead on Butch Wilson runs of seven and one-yard before Tulane scored their lone points on a six-yard Wilson Miller touchdown pass to Clement Dellenger that made the score 14–6 early in the second quarter. The Green Wave touchdown was the first allowed by the Crimson Tide defense over a period that spanned 35 quarters back to their win over NC State in 1961.

The Crimson Tide responded with 22 second quarter points and took a 36–6 halftime lead. Cotton Clark scored first on an 11-yard run, Joe Namath second on a one-yard run and then Clark scored again on a 23-yard pass from Namath. After a scoreless third, Namath threw a two-yard touchdown pass to Clark in the fourth and made the final score 44–6.

=== Vanderbilt ===
Team	1	2	3	4	Total
Vanderbilt	7	0	0	0	7
• #2 Alabama	7	0	7	3	17

- Date: October 6
- Location: Legion Field
  Birmingham, AL
- Game attendance: 40,000

Although they defeated Tulane on the road, Alabama dropped from the No. 1 to No. 2 position in the AP Poll prior to their game against Vanderbilt. In the second Legion Field game of the season, the Crimson Tide defeated the Commodores 17–7 at Birmingham. Vanderbilt scored their first points of the 1962 season when Terrell Dye recovered a Cotton Clark fumbled punt in the endzone for a 7–0 lead. Alabama responded on the drive that ensued with a 19-yard Joe Namath touchdown pass to Butch Henry and tied the game 7–7. The Crimson Tide then took a 14–7 lead early in the third quarter after Namath threw a 34-yard touchdown pass to Richard Williamson. A 20-yard Tim Davis field goal in the fourth quarter then made the final score 17–7.

=== Houston ===
Team	1	2	3	4	Total
Houston	3	0	0	0	3
• #1 Alabama	0	7	7	0	14

- Date: October 13
- Location: Denny Stadium
  Tuscaloosa, AL
- Game attendance: 30,000

With their victory over Vanderbilt, coupled with an Ohio State loss to UCLA, the Crimson Tide moved back into the No. 1 position in the polls prior to their game against Houston. Against the Cougars, the Alabama defense was dominant and allowed minus 49 yards rushing in this 14–3 victory at Denny Stadium. Houston took an early 3–0 lead after a Gene Ritch interception set up a 30-yard Bill McMillan field goal in the first quarter. The Crimson Tide responded in the second quarter and took a 7–3 halftime lead when Lee Roy Jordan recovered a Cougars' fumble in the endzone for a touchdown. Cotton Clark then provided the final points of the game with his three-yard touchdown run in the third quarter that made the final score 14–3.

=== Tennessee ===
Third Saturday in October

Team	1	2	3	4	Total
• #2 Alabama	6	6	0	15	27
Tennessee	0	0	7	0	7

- Date: October 20
- Location: Neyland Stadium
  Knoxville, TN
- Game attendance: 44,600

Alabama dropped from the No. 1 position back into the No. 2 spot in the week leading into their game at Tennessee. Against the Volunteers, Alabama won 27–7 for Coach Bryant's first all-time victory at Neyland Stadium. The Crimson Tide took a 12–0 halftime lead after Tim Davis converted a pair of field goals in the first and Joe Namath threw a 35-yard touchdown pass to Benny Nelson in the second quarter. The Vols responded in the third quarter with a six-yard Bobby Morton touchdown pass to Jerry Ensley that cut the Alabama lead to 12–7. However, the Crimson Tide closed the game with a pair of fourth-quarter touchdowns. The first touchdown came on a three-yard Cotton Clark run and the second on a 20-yard Jack Hurlbut pass to Benny Nelson and made the final score 27–7.

=== Tulsa ===
Team	1	2	3	4	Total
Tulsa	0	0	0	6	6
• #2 Alabama	7	14	0	14	35

- Date: October 27
- Location: Denny Stadium
  Tuscaloosa, AL
- Game attendance: 25,000

As they entered their game against Tulsa, the Crimson Tide retained the No. 2 spot in the polls behind Texas. In their non-conference matchup against the Golden Hurricane, Alabama only allowed Tulsa to cross midfield once in the first half en route to a 35–6 victory. Richard Williamson opened the game with a recovered Tulsa fumble on the first offensive play of the game, and four plays later Alabama led 7–0 on a one-yard Joe Namath touchdown run. After a second, one-yard Namath touchdown run, Cotton Clark made what was then the third longest touchdown score in Alabama history with his 91-yard run that made the halftime score 21–0. The Crimson Tide extended their lead further to 35–0 in the fourth quarter with touchdown runs of two-yards by Clark and eight-yards by Gary Martin. However, the shutout bid ended late in the fourth after the Golden Hurricane scored their only points on a one-yard Jerry Swanson touchdown run that made the final score 35–6.

=== Mississippi State ===
Team	1	2	3	4	Total
• #2 Alabama	7	7	6	0	20
Mississippi State	0	0	0	0	0

- Date: November 3
- Location: Scott Field
  Starkville, MS
- Game attendance: 26,000

After their victory over Tulsa, Alabama retained their No. 2 ranking as they prepared to play Mississippi State. On homecoming at Starkville, the Crimson Tide shutout the Bulldogs 20–0. Alabama took an early lead when Cotton Clark scored on a four-yard touchdown run in the first quarter for a 7–0 lead. Joe Namath was then responsible for the final pair of touchdowns on passes of 27 and three-yards to Bill Battle in the second and third quarters for the 20–0 victory.

=== Miami ===
Team	1	2	3	4	Total
Miami	0	3	0	0	3
• #3 Alabama	0	0	23	13	36

- Date: November 10
- Location: Denny Stadium
  Tuscaloosa, AL
- Game attendance: 43,200

Although they shutout Mississippi State one the road, Alabama dropped into the No. 3 ranking as they prepared to play Miami. On homecoming in Tuscaloosa, Alabama trailed the Hurricanes 3–0 at halftime but rallied with 36 unanswered points in the second half for the 36–3 victory. The first half was dominated by both defenses with the only points scored by Miami in the second quarter on a 40-yard Bob Wilson field goal. The Crimson Tide then scored three third-quarter touchdowns and took a 23–3 lead into the fourth quarter. Points were scored by Cotton Clark on runs of one and six-yards and on a 12-yard Joe Namath pass to Bill Battle. A pair of fourth-quarter touchdowns on one-yard runs by Namath and Jack Hurlbut made the finals score 36–3.

=== Georgia Tech ===
Team	1	2	3	4	Total
#1 Alabama	0	0	0	6	6
• Georgia Tech	0	7	0	0	7

- Date: November 17
- Location: Grant Field
  Atlanta, GA
- Game attendance: 52,971

For their game at Grant Field against Georgia Tech, the Crimson Tide moved back into the No. 1 position in the national polls. In the game, the Yellow Jackets ended Alabama's 19-game winning and 26-game unbeaten streak that dated back to the Crimson Tide's 1960 season, with their 7–6 upset in Atlanta. After a scoreless first quarter, Georgia Tech scored their only touchdown on a nine-yard Patrick McNames run for a 7–0 lead. The Yellow Jackets continued to hold the Crimson Tide scoreless until the fourth quarter when Cotton Clark scored on a two-yard run. However instead of playing for the tie with an extra point attempt, Bryant decided to go for a two-point conversion that failed and resulted in the eventual 7–6 Tech win. In defeat, Joe Namath threw four interceptions.

=== Auburn ===
Iron Bowl

Team	1	2	3	4	Total
Auburn	0	0	0	0	0
• #5 Alabama	7	14	10	7	38

- Date: December 1
- Location: Legion Field
  Birmingham, AL
- Game attendance: 54,000

Scoring summary
Q1	ALA	Wilson 92 yard kickoff return (Davis kick)	ALA 7–0
Q2	ALA	Namath 17 yard run (Davis kick)	ALA 14–0
Q2	ALA	Battle recovered blocked punt in end zone (Davis kick)	ALA 21–0
Q3	ALA	Clark 15 yard pass from Namath (Davis kick)	ALA 28–0
Q3	ALA	Davis 39 yard field goal	ALA 31–0
Q4	ALA	Williamson 16 yard pass from Namath (Davis kick)	ALA 38–0

After their loss against Georgia Tech, Alabama dropped to No. 6 in the AP Poll, but in the week prior to their game against Auburn, they moved into the No. 5 position. Against the Tigers in the annual Iron Bowl game at Legion Field, Alabama shutout Auburn for the fourth consecutive season, this time by a score of 38–0. On the first offensive play of the game, Alabama took a 7–0 lead when George Wilson scored on a 92-yard touchdown run. They then extended their lead to 21–0 at halftime after touchdowns were scored on a 17-yard Joe Namath run and when Bill Battle recovered a blocked punt in the endzone in the second quarter. The Crimson Tide then closed the game with 17 second half points and won 38–0. Points were scored in the third on a 15-yard Namath touchdown pass to Cotton Clark and on a 39-yard Tim Davis field goal in the third and on a 16-yard Namath pass to Richard Williamson in the fourth quarter.

=== Oklahoma ===
1963 Orange Bowl

Team	1	2	3	4	Total
#8 Oklahoma	0	0	0	0	0
• #5 Alabama	7	7	3	0	17

- Date: January 1, 1963
- Location: Miami Orange Bowl
  Miami, FL
- Game attendance: 72,880

After their victory over Auburn, the Crimson Tide formally accepted an invitation to play Big Eight Conference champion Oklahoma in the 1963 edition of the Orange Bowl. In what was the first all-time meeting between the schools, Alabama shutout the Sooners 17–0 behind a dominant performance by linebacker Lee Roy Jordan who set a school bowl record with his 31 tackles. Alabama took a 14–0 halftime lead after touchdowns were scored on a 25-yard Joe Namath pass to Richard Williamson in the first and on a 15-yard Cotton Clark run in the second quarter. A 19-yard Tim Davis field goal in the third quarter provided for the final 17–0 margin of victory.

== NFL/AFL Draft ==
Several players that were varsity lettermen from the 1962 squad were drafted into the National Football League (NFL) and the American Football League (AFL) between the 1963 and 1965 drafts. These players included the following:

Year	Round	Overall	Player name	Position	NFL/AFL team
1963 NFL draft	1	6	Lee Roy Jordan	Linebacker	Dallas Cowboys
1963 NFL draft	2	24	Butch Wilson	Back	Baltimore Colts
1963 NFL draft	3	33	Mike Fracchia	Back	St. Louis Cardinals
1963 AFL draft	2	14	Lee Roy Jordan	Linebacker	Boston Patriots
1963 AFL draft	6	41	Butch Wilson	Tight end	Oakland Raiders
1963 AFL draft	7	55	Richard Williamson	End	Boston Patriots
1964 NFL draft	5	61	Benny Nelson	Halfback	Detroit Lions
1964 NFL draft	11	151	Eddie Versprille	Running back	Cleveland Browns
1964 AFL draft	8	59	Steve Wright	Offensive tackle	New York Jets
1964 AFL draft	12	94	Benny Nelson	Defensive back	Houston Oilers
1965 NFL draft	1	12	Joe Namath	Quarterback	St. Louis Cardinals
1965 NFL draft	3	40	Ray Ogden	End	St. Louis Cardinals
1965 NFL draft	9	120	Frank McClendon	Tackle	Minnesota Vikings
1965 NFL draft	10	131	Gaylon McCullough	Center	Dallas Cowboys
1965 AFL draft	1	1	Joe Namath	Quarterback	New York Jets
1965 AFL draft	8	58	Ray Ogden	Tight end	Houston Oilers
1965 AFL draft	19	147	Frank McClendon	Tackle	Oakland Raiders

== Freshman squad ==
Prior to the 1972 NCAA University Division football season, NCAA rules prohibited freshmen from participating on the varsity team, and as such many schools fielded freshmen teams. For the 1962 season, the Alabama freshmen squad was coached by Sam Bailey and finished their season with a record of two wins and one loss (2–1). In their first game of the season, Alabama defeated Mississippi State 20–2 at Denny Stadium. Alabama took a 6–0 first quarter lead on a one-yard Dickie Bean touchdown run that was set up by a 69-yard Vernon Newbill interception return. They extended their lead further to 13–0 later in the quarter when Steve Sloan scored on a 28-yard touchdown run. State then scored their only points in the second quarter when Mike Childs sacked Sloan in the endzone for a safety that made the halftime score 13–2. After a scoreless third, Alabama made the final score 20–2 after Jimmy Mitchell scored on a seven-yard touchdown run.

In their second game, the Baby Tide defeated Tulane 27–16 at Tulane Stadium, but then lost to Auburn in their season finale at Denny Stadium 14–13. Alabama took an early 7–0 lead when Dickie Bean scored on a one-yard touchdown run. Auburn then responded and took a 14–7 halftime lead with a pair of second-quarter touchdowns. The first came on a 96-yard Gerald Gross kickoff return and the second on a 62-yard Joe Campbell pass to Gross. Late in the fourth, Alabama scored on a 27-yard Steve Sloan touchdown pass to Jerry Duncan; however, Sloan's two-point conversion attempt was intercepted by Bill Cody and the Tigers won 14–13.

== Personnel ==
=== Varsity letter winners ===
Player	Hometown	Position
Steve Allen	Athens, Alabama	Guard
Bill Battle	Birmingham, Alabama	End
Clark Boler	Northport, Alabama	Tackle
Cotton Clark	Kansas, Alabama	Halfback
Elbert Cook	Jacksonville, Florida	Linebacker
Ingram Culwell	Tuscaloosa, Alabama	Halfback
Tim Davis	Columbus, Georgia	Placekicker
Jimmy Dill	Mobile, Alabama	End
Grady Elmore	Ozark, Alabama	Halfback
Morris Frank	Huntsville, Alabama	
Wayne Freeman	Fort Payne, Alabama	Offensive guard
Hudson Harris	Tarrant, Alabama	Halfback
Butch Henry	Selma, Alabama	End
Mike Hopper	Huntsville, Alabama	End
Jack Hurlbut	Houston, Texas	Quarterback
Lee Roy Jordan	Excel, Alabama	Linebacker
Dan Kearley	Talladega, Alabama	Defensive tackle
Dale Layton	Sylacauga, Alabama	End
Al Lewis	Covington, Kentucky	Guard
Gary Martin	Dothan, Alabama	Halfback
Frankie McClendon	Guntersville, Alabama	Tackle
Gaylon McCollough	Enterprise, Alabama	Center
Larry McGill	Panama City, Florida	Halfback
Marlin Mooneyham	Montgomery, Alabama	Fullback
John Moore	Montgomery, Alabama	Halfback
Mal Moore	Dozier, Alabama	Quarterback
Farris Morton	Sardis, Alabama	End
Joe Namath	Beaver Falls, Pennsylvania	Quarterback
Benny Nelson	Huntsville, Alabama	Halfback
Richard O'Dell	Lincoln, Alabama	End
Ray Ogden	Jesup, Georgia	Halfback
Charley Pell	Albertville, Alabama	Tackle
Bob Pettee	Bradenton, Florida	Guard
Billy Piper	Poplar Bluff, Missouri	Halfback
Carlton Rankin	Piedmont, Alabama	Quarterback
Billy Richardson	Jasper, Alabama	Halfback
Jimmy Sharpe	Montgomery, Alabama	Guard
Jim Simmons	Piedmont, Alabama	Tackle
Charles Stephens	Thomasville, Alabama	End
Gerald Stephens	Thomasville, Alabama	Center
Eddie Versprille	Norfolk, Virginia	Fullback
Larry Wall	Fairfax, Alabama	Fullback
Bill Wieseman	Louisville, Kentucky	Guard
Richard Williamson	Fort Deposit, Alabama	End
Butch Wilson	Hueytown, Alabama	Halfback
Jimmy Wilson	Haleyville, Alabama	Guard
Steve Wright	Louisville, Kentucky	Tackle

=== Coaching staff ===
Name	Position	Seasons at Alabama	Alma mater
Bear Bryant	Head coach	5	Alabama (1936)
Sam Bailey	Assistant coach	5	Ouachita Baptist (1949)
Jim Blevins	Assistant coach	1	Alabama (1960)
Phil Cutchin	Assistant coach	5	Kentucky (1943)
Jim Goostree	Assistant coach	6	Tennessee (1952)
Clem Gryska	Assistant coach	3	Alabama (1948)
Dude Hennessey	Assistant coach	3	Kentucky (1955)
Pat James	Assistant coach	5	Kentucky (1951)
Carney Laslie	Assistant coach	6	Alabama (1934)
Hayden Riley	Assistant coach	5	Alabama (1948)
Howard Schnellenberger	Assistant coach	2	Kentucky (1956)
Gene Stallings	Assistant coach	5	Texas A&M (1957)
