= 1963 Orange Bowl =

American college football game

- 29th Orange Bowl
- The Miami Orange Bowl in Miami, Florida, hosted the Orange Bowl.
Oklahoma Sooners	Alabama Crimson Tide
(8–2)	(9–1)
Big Eight	SEC
0	17
Head coach: Bud Wilkinson	Head coach: Bear Bryant
AP / Coaches; 8 / 7	AP / Coaches; 5 / 5
	1	2	3	4	Total
Oklahoma	0	0	0	0	0
Alabama	7	7	3	0	17
- Date: January 1, 1963
- Season: 1962
- Stadium: Orange Bowl
- Location: Miami, Florida
- Favorite: Alabama by 3 points
- Referee: E.D. Cavette (SEC; split crew: SEC, Big Eight)
- Attendance: 73,380

United States TV coverage
- Network: ABC
- Announcers: Curt Gowdy, Paul Christman, Jim McKay

The 1963 Orange Bowl was the 29th edition of the college football bowl game, played at the Orange Bowl in Miami, Florida, on Tuesday, January 1. Part of the 1962–63 bowl game season, it matched the fifth-ranked Alabama Crimson Tide of the Southeastern Conference and the #8 Oklahoma Sooners of the Big Eight Conference. With President John F. Kennedy and First Lady Jacqueline Kennedy in attendance, Alabama shut out the Sooners 17–0.

== Game summary ==
Alabama's Richard Williamson scored in the first quarter on a 25-yard touchdown pass from sophomore quarterback Joe Namath to take a 7–0 lead. A 15-yard Cotton Clark touchdown run in the second quarter extended the lead to 14–0.

In the third quarter, Alabama scored their final points after Tim Davis hit a 19-yard field goal. Lee Roy Jordan recorded an Alabama bowl record of 31 tackles in the victory. The fourth quarter was scoreless.

Scoring summary

Quarter	Time	Drive			Team	Scoring information	Score	
Quarter	Time	Plays	Yards	TOP	Team	Scoring information	OK	ALA
1			61		ALA	Richard Williamson 25-yard touchdown reception from Joe Namath, Tim Davis kick good	0	7
2			34		ALA	Cotton Clark 15-yard touchdown run, Tim Davis kick good	0	14
3			30		ALA	19-yard field goal by Tim Davis	0	17
"TOP" = time of possession. For other American football terms, see Glossary of American football.							0	17
