= 1962 Gator Bowl =

American college football game

Penn State Nittany Lions	Florida Gators
(9–1)	(6–4)
Independent	SEC
7	17
Head coach: Rip Engle	Head coach: Ray Graves
AP / Coaches; 9 / 9
	1	2	3	4	Total
Penn State	0	7	0	0	7
Florida	3	7	0	7	17
- Date: December 29, 1962
- Season: 1962
- Stadium: Gator Bowl
- Location: Jacksonville, Florida
- MVP: Tommy Shannon (QB, Florida) & Dave Robinson (DT, Penn State)
- Attendance: 50,286

The 1962 Gator Bowl was a post-season college football bowl game between the Penn State Nittany Lions an independent and the Gators of the University of Florida representing the SEC. Florida upset Penn State, 17–7. To inspire the underdog Gators against a integrated Nittany Lions squad, the Confederate Battle Flag was worn on their helmets.

== Game summary ==
Quarterback Tom Shannon was the MVP for Florida, while defensive tackle Dave Robinson was the MVP for Penn State.

Scoring summary

Quarter	Time	Drive			Team	Scoring information	Score	
Quarter	Time	Plays	Yards	TOP	Team	Scoring information	PSU	FLA
1		3	-4		FLA	43-yard field goal by Bobby Lyle	0	3
2		10	24		FLA	Larry Dupree 7-yard touchdown reception from Tom Shannon, Jimmy Hall kick good	0	10
2		17	76		PSU	Pete Liske 1-yard touchdown run, Ron Coates kick good	7	10
4		6	51		FLA	Hagood Clarke 18-yard touchdown reception from Tom Shannon, Jimmy Hall kick good	7	17
"TOP" = time of possession. For other American football terms, see Glossary of American football.							7	17
