= 1962 Tennessee Volunteers football team =

American college football season

1962 Tennessee Volunteers football
- Conference: Southeastern Conference
- Record: 4–6 (2–6 SEC)
- Head coach: Bowden Wyatt (8th season)
- Home stadium: Shields–Watkins Field

1962 Southeastern Conference football standings
	Conf.					Overall
Team	W		L		T	W		L		T
No. 3 Ole Miss $	6	–	0	–	0	10	–	0	–	0
No. 5 Alabama	6	–	1	–	0	10	–	1	–	0
No. 7 LSU	5	–	1	–	0	9	–	1	–	1
Georgia Tech	5	–	2	–	0	7	–	3	–	1
Florida	4	–	2	–	0	7	–	4	–	0
Auburn	4	–	3	–	0	6	–	3	–	1
Georgia	2	–	3	–	1	3	–	4	–	3
Kentucky	2	–	3	–	1	3	–	5	–	2
Mississippi State	2	–	5	–	0	3	–	6	–	0
Tennessee	2	–	6	–	0	4	–	6	–	0
Vanderbilt	1	–	6	–	0	1	–	9	–	0
Tulane	0	–	7	–	0	0	–	10	–	0
$ – Conference champion; Rankings from AP Poll

The 1962 Tennessee Volunteers football team (variously "Tennessee", "UT" or the "Vols") represented the University of Tennessee in the 1962 NCAA University Division football season. Playing as a member of the Southeastern Conference (SEC), the team was led by head coach Bowden Wyatt, in his eighth year, and played their home games at Shields–Watkins Field in Knoxville, Tennessee. They finished the season with a record of four wins and six losses (4–6 overall, 2–6 in the SEC). The Volunteers offense scored 179 points while the defense allowed 134 points.

== Schedule ==
Date	Opponent	Site	TV	Result	Attendance	Source
September 29	at Auburn	Legion Field; Birmingham, AL (rivalry)		L 21–22	48,000	
October 6	vs. Mississippi State	Crump Stadium; Memphis, TN		L 6–7	22,013	
October 13	at Georgia Tech	Grant Field; Atlanta, GA (rivalry)		L 0–17	52,223	
October 20	No. 2 Alabama	Shields–Watkins Field; Knoxville, TN (Third Saturday in October)	CBS	L 7–27	44,600	
October 27	Chattanooga*	Shields–Watkins Field; Knoxville, TN		W 48–14	16,000	
November 3	Wake Forest*	Shields–Watkins Field; Knoxville, TN		W 23–0	22,325	
November 10	Tulane	Shields–Watkins Field; Knoxville, TN		W 28–16	19,965	
November 17	No. 3 Ole Miss^{†}	Shields–Watkins Field; Knoxville, TN (rivalry)		L 6–19	37,166	
November 24	Kentucky	Shields–Watkins Field; Knoxville, TN (rivalry)		L 10–12	34,172	
December 1	at Vanderbilt	Dudley Field; Nashville, TN (rivalry)		W 30–0	37,166	
*Non-conference game; ^{†}Homecoming; Rankings from AP Poll released prior to the game
