= 1962 LSU Tigers football team =

American college football season

1962 LSU Tigers football

Cotton Bowl Classic, W 13–0 vs. Texas
- Conference: Southeastern Conference

Ranking
- Coaches: No. 8
- AP: No. 7
- Record: 9–1–1 (5–1 SEC)
- Head coach: Charles McClendon (1st season)
- Home stadium: Tiger Stadium

1962 Southeastern Conference football standings
	Conf.					Overall
Team	W		L		T	W		L		T
No. 3 Ole Miss $	6	–	0	–	0	10	–	0	–	0
No. 5 Alabama	6	–	1	–	0	10	–	1	–	0
No. 7 LSU	5	–	1	–	0	9	–	1	–	1
Georgia Tech	5	–	2	–	0	7	–	3	–	1
Florida	4	–	2	–	0	7	–	4	–	0
Auburn	4	–	3	–	0	6	–	3	–	1
Georgia	2	–	3	–	1	3	–	4	–	3
Kentucky	2	–	3	–	1	3	–	5	–	2
Mississippi State	2	–	5	–	0	3	–	6	–	0
Tennessee	2	–	6	–	0	4	–	6	–	0
Vanderbilt	1	–	6	–	0	1	–	9	–	0
Tulane	0	–	7	–	0	0	–	10	–	0
$ – Conference champion; Rankings from AP Poll

The 1962 LSU Tigers football team was an American football team that represented Louisiana State University (LSU) as a member of the Southeastern Conference (SEC) during the 1962 NCAA University Division football season. In their first year under head coach Charles McClendon, the Tigers compiled an overall record of 9–1–1, with a conference record of 5–1, and finished third in the SEC.

== Schedule ==
Date	Opponent	Rank	Site	TV	Result	Attendance	Source
September 22	Texas A&M*	No. 5	Tiger Stadium; Baton Rouge, LA (rivalry)		W 21–0	68,000	
September 29	Rice*	No. 5	Tiger Stadium; Baton Rouge, LA		T 6–6	67,500	
October 6	at No. 5 Georgia Tech		Grant Field; Atlanta, GA	NBC	W 10–7	49,744	
October 13	Miami (FL)*	No. 6	Tiger Stadium; Baton Rouge, LA		W 17–3	67,500	
October 20	at Kentucky	No. 4	McLean Stadium; Lexington, KY		W 7–0	37,000	
October 27	Florida^{†}	No. 6	Tiger Stadium; Baton Rouge, LA (rivalry)		W 23–0	67,000	
November 3	No. 6 Ole Miss	No. 4	Tiger Stadium; Baton Rouge, LA (rivalry)		L 7–15	67,500	
November 10	TCU*	No. 9	Tiger Stadium; Baton Rouge, LA		W 5–0	66,500	
November 17	at Mississippi State	No. 10	Mississippi Veterans Memorial Stadium; Jackson, MS (rivalry)		W 28–0	40,000	
November 24	at Tulane	No. 8	Tulane Stadium; New Orleans, LA (Battle for the Rag)		W 38–3	41,000	
January 1, 1963	vs. No. 4 Texas*	No. 7	Cotton Bowl; Dallas, TX (Cotton Bowl Classic)	CBS	W 13–0	75,500	
*Non-conference game; ^{†}Homecoming; Rankings from AP Poll released prior to the game
