= 1962 Bluebonnet Bowl =

Georgia Tech Yellow Jackets	Missouri Tigers
(7–2–1)	(7–1–2)
10	14
Head coach: Bobby Dodd	Head coach: Dan Devine
	1	2	3	4	Total
Georgia Tech	0	7	3	0	10
Missouri	7	0	7	0	14
- Date: December 22, 1962
- Season: 1962
- Stadium: Rice Stadium
- Location: Houston, Texas
- Attendance: 55,000

The 1962 Bluebonnet Bowl was an American college football bowl game played on December 22, 1962, at Rice Stadium in Houston, Texas. The game pitted the Missouri Tigers and the Georgia Tech Yellow Jackets.

== Background ==
After a 1–1 start (with a tie to Minnesota that dropped them from #10 to unranked), the Tigers won six straight games, rising to #6 in the rankings before a matchup with Oklahoma, the eventual Big Eight Conference champion. A 13–0 loss dropped them out permanently, with a tie to rival Kansas ending their season, though it was their sixth straight winning season. Missouri was invited to their third bowl game in four seasons. Georgia Tech won their first two games to rise to #5 in the polls, before a 10–7 loss to LSU at home dropped them out. The Yellow Jackets went 5–1–1, with a 7–6 win over #1 ranked Alabama being a highlight win. The Yellow Jackets were invited to their third bowl game in four seasons.

== Game summary ==
- Missouri – Johnson 21-yard touchdown run (Leistritz Kick)
- Georgia Tech – Auer 6-yard touchdown run (Lothridge Kick)
- Missouri – Tobin 77-yard touchdown run (Leistritz Kick)
- Georgia Tech – Lothridge 26-yard field goal

In a game where Missouri did not complete a single pass, it was halfback Bill Tobin who led the Tigers on the rushing attack with 117 yards (while the rest of the Tigers had 141 yards), with Tobin scoring the go-ahead touchdown from 77 yards out with 5:54 to go in the third quarter. Georgia Tech had 13 first downs to Missouri's 10 and 68 passing yard to Missouri's 0, though they were outrushed 258 to 169. Both teams had four turnovers (Georgia Tech had four passes intercepted while Missouri had two passes intercepted and two fumbles).

== Aftermath ==
Neither team reached the Bluebonnet Bowl ever again. Both teams reached bowl games twice in the remainder of the decade.
