= 1962 Auburn Tigers football team =

American college football season

1962 Auburn Tigers football
- Conference: Southeastern Conference
- Record: 6–3–1 (4–3 SEC)
- Head coach: Ralph Jordan (12th season)
- Home stadium: Cliff Hare Stadium; Legion Field

1962 Southeastern Conference football standings
| | Conf. | | | | | Overall |
| Team | W | | L | | T | W | | L | | T |
|---|---|---|---|---|---|---|---|---|---|---|
| No. 3 Ole Miss $ | 6 | – | 0 | – | 0 | 10 | – | 0 | – | 0 |
| No. 5 Alabama | 6 | – | 1 | – | 0 | 10 | – | 1 | – | 0 |
| No. 7 LSU | 5 | – | 1 | – | 0 | 9 | – | 1 | – | 1 |
| Georgia Tech | 5 | – | 2 | – | 0 | 7 | – | 3 | – | 1 |
| Florida | 4 | – | 2 | – | 0 | 7 | – | 4 | – | 0 |
| Auburn | 4 | – | 3 | – | 0 | 6 | – | 3 | – | 1 |
| Georgia | 2 | – | 3 | – | 1 | 3 | – | 4 | – | 3 |
| Kentucky | 2 | – | 3 | – | 1 | 3 | – | 5 | – | 2 |
| Mississippi State | 2 | – | 5 | – | 0 | 3 | – | 6 | – | 0 |
| Tennessee | 2 | – | 6 | – | 0 | 4 | – | 6 | – | 0 |
| Vanderbilt | 1 | – | 6 | – | 0 | 1 | – | 9 | – | 0 |
| Tulane | 0 | – | 7 | – | 0 | 0 | – | 10 | – | 0 |
$ – Conference champion; Rankings from AP Poll

The 1962 Auburn Tigers football team represented Auburn University in the 1962 NCAA University Division football season. It was the Tigers' 71st overall and 29th season as a member of the Southeastern Conference (SEC). The team was led by head coach Ralph "Shug" Jordan, in his 12th year, and played their home games at Cliff Hare Stadium in Auburn and Legion Field in Birmingham, Alabama. They finished with a record of six wins, three losses and one tie (6–3–1 overall, 4–3 in the SEC).

== Schedule ==
| Date | Opponent | Rank | Site | Result | Attendance | Source |
|---|---|---|---|---|---|---|
| September 29 | Tennessee | | Legion Field; Birmingham, AL (rivalry) | W 22–21 | 48,000 | |
| October 6 | at Kentucky | | McLean Stadium; Lexington, KY | W 16–6 | 33,500 | |
| October 13 | Chattanooga* | | Cliff Hare Stadium; Auburn, AL | W 54–6 | 20,000–22,000 | |
| October 20 | Georgia Tech | | Legion Field; Birmingham, AL (rivalry) | W 17–14 | 56,319 | |
| October 27 | at Clemson* | | Memorial Stadium; Clemson, SC (rivalry) | W 17–14 | 24,000 | |
| November 3 | at Florida | No. 10 | Florida Field; Gainesville, FL (rivalry) | L 3–22 | 36,000 | |
| November 10 | Mississippi State^{†} | | Cliff Hare Stadium; Auburn, AL | W 9–3 | 35,000 | |
| November 17 | Georgia | | Cliff Hare Stadium; Auburn, AL (rivalry) | L 21–30 | 35,000 | |
| November 24 | Florida State* | | Cliff Hare Stadium; Auburn, AL | T 14–14 | 20,000 | |
| December 1 | vs. No. 5 Alabama | | Legion Field; Birmingham, AL (Iron Bowl) | L 0–38 | 54,000 | |
*Non-conference game; ^{†}Homecoming; Rankings from AP Poll released prior to the game

== Roster ==
- QB Jimmy Sidle
