= 1962 Missouri Tigers football team =

American college football season

1962 Missouri Tigers football

Bluebonnet Bowl champion

Bluebonnet Bowl, W 14–10 vs. Georgia Tech
- Conference: Big Eight Conference

Ranking
- Coaches: No. 12
- Record: 8–1–2 (5–1–1 Big 8)
- Head coach: Dan Devine (5th season)
- Home stadium: Memorial Stadium

1962 Big Eight Conference football standings
	Conf.					Overall
Team	W		L		T	W		L		T
No. 8 Oklahoma $	7	–	0	–	0	8	–	3	–	0
Missouri	5	–	1	–	1	8	–	1	–	2
Nebraska	5	–	2	–	0	9	–	2	–	0
Kansas	4	–	2	–	1	6	–	3	–	1
Iowa State	3	–	4	–	0	5	–	5	–	0
Oklahoma State	2	–	5	–	0	4	–	6	–	0
Colorado	1	–	6	–	0	2	–	8	–	0
Kansas State	0	–	7	–	0	0	–	10	–	0
$ – Conference champion; Rankings from AP Poll

The 1962 Missouri Tigers football team was an American football team that represented the University of Missouri in the Big Eight Conference (Big 8) during the 1962 NCAA University Division football season. The team compiled an 8–1–2 record (5–1–1 against Big 8 opponents), finished in second place in the Big 8, and outscored opponents by a combined total of 204 to 62. Dan Devine was the head coach for the fifth of 13 seasons. The team played its home games at Memorial Stadium in Columbia, Missouri.

The Tigers defeated the Georgia Tech Yellow Jackets 14-10 in the Bluebonnet Bowl in Houston.

The team's statistical leaders included Johnny Roland with 830 rushing yards, 850 yards of total offense, and 78 points, Jim Johnson with 198 passing yards, Bill Tobin with 75 receiving yards, and Bill Tobin with 38 point scored.

== Schedule ==
Date	Opponent	Rank	Site	Result	Attendance	Source
September 22	at California*		California Memorial Stadium; Berkeley, CA	W 21–10	36,500	
September 29	at Minnesota*	No. 10	Memorial Stadium; Minneapolis, MN	T 0–0	60,133	
October 6	Arizona*		Memorial Stadium; Columbia, MO	W 17–7	42,000	
October 13	at Kansas State		Memorial Stadium; Manhattan, KS	W 32–0	18,000	
October 20	Oklahoma State		Memorial Stadium; Columbia, MO	W 23–6	37,000	
October 27	Iowa State		Memorial Stadium; Columbia, MO (rivalry)	W 21–6	40,700	
November 3	at Nebraska		Memorial Stadium; Lincoln, NE (rivalry)	W 16–7	36,501	
November 10	Colorado	No. 7	Memorial Stadium; Columbia, MO	W 57–0	42,500	
November 17	at Oklahoma	No. 6	Oklahoma Memorial Stadium; Norman, OK (rivalry)	L 0–13	61,826	
November 24	Kansas		Memorial Stadium; Columbia, MO (Border War)	T 3–3	46,000	
December 22	vs. Georgia Tech*		Rice Stadium; Houston, TX (Bluebonnet Bowl)	W 14–10	55,000	
*Non-conference game; Rankings from AP Poll released prior to the game; Source:
