= Glynn Griffing =

American football player (born 1940)

No. 15, 12
- Position: Quarterback

Personal information
- Born: December 1, 1940 (age 85); Bentonia, Mississippi, U.S.
- Listed height: 6 ft 1 in (1.85 m)
- Listed weight: 200 lb (91 kg)

Career information
- College: Ole Miss (1959-1962)
- NFL draft: 1962: 4th round, 54th overall pick
- AFL draft: 1962: 14th round, 111th overall pick

Career history
- New York Giants (1963); Orlando Panthers (1966)

Awards and highlights
- National champion (1960); First-team All-American (1962); First-team All-SEC (1962)

Career NFL statistics
- Passing yards: 306
- TD–INT: 3-4
- Passer rating: 52.7
- Stats at Pro Football Reference

Wilburn Glynn Griffing (born December 1, 1940) is an American former professional football player who was a quarterback for one season with the New York Giants in the National Football League (NFL). He played college football for the Ole Miss Rebels and was selected in the fourth round of the 1962 NFL draft. Griffing was also selected in the 14th round of the 1962 AFL draft by the Houston Oilers.
