= Cotton Bowl Classic =

Annual American college football postseason game

- Goodyear Cotton Bowl Classic
- Stadium: AT&T Stadium
- Location: Arlington, Texas
- Previous stadiums: Cotton Bowl (1937–2009)
- Previous locations: Dallas, Texas
- Operated: 1937–present
- Championship affiliation: CFP (2014–present); Bowl Coalition (1992–1994)
- Previous conference tie-ins: SWC (1941–1995); Big 12 (1997–2014); SEC (1999–2014)
- Payout: US$4 million (non-playoff years)
- Website: cottonbowl.com

Sponsors
- Mobil (1989–1995); Southwestern Bell Corporation/SBC Communications/AT&T (1997–2014); Goodyear (2014–present)

Former names
- Cotton Bowl (1937–1988); Mobil Cotton Bowl Classic (1989–1995); Southwestern Bell Cotton Bowl Classic (1996–2000); SBC Communications Cotton Bowl Classic (2001–2005); AT&T Cotton Bowl Classic (2006–2014)

2025 matchup
- Ohio State vs. Miami (FL) (Miami 24–14)

The Cotton Bowl Classic (also known as the Cotton Bowl) is an American college football bowl game played annually in the Dallas–Fort Worth metroplex since January 1, 1937.

The game was originally played at its namesake stadium in Dallas before moving to AT&T Stadium in nearby Arlington in 2010. Since 2014, the game has been sponsored by the Goodyear Tire and Rubber Company and officially known as the Goodyear Cotton Bowl Classic; it was previously sponsored by Mobil (1989–1995) and Southwestern Bell Corporation/SBC Communications/AT&T (1997–2014).

From 1941 to 1995, the game hosted the champion of the Southwest Conference (SWC) against a team invited from elsewhere in the country, frequently a major independent or a runner-up from the Southeastern Conference (SEC). Following the dissolution of the SWC in 1996, the game hosted a runner-up from the Big 12 Conference, facing an SEC team from 1999 to 2014.

In 2014, the Cotton Bowl Classic, as one of the "New Year's Six" bowls, became a part of the College Football Playoff. As part of the four-team playoff from 2014 to 2023, the Cotton Bowl served as a semifinal game in 2015, 2018, and 2021.

With the expansion of the College Football Playoff to twelve teams in the 2024–25 season, the Cotton Bowl Classic will serve as either a quarterfinal or semifinal each year. It served as a semifinal in 2025 and will serve as a quarterfinal in 2026. When serving as a semifinal, the game will be played one week after New Year's Day.

The winner of the Cotton Bowl is awarded the Field Scovell Trophy.

== History ==
=== 1930s ===
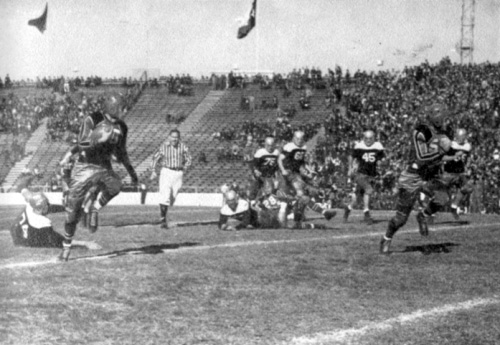
Action during the 1939 game between St. Mary's and Texas Tech

The Cotton Bowl Classic was founded in Dallas in 1937 at the Texas State Fair Grounds, when Texas oil executive J. Curtis Sanford financed the first bowl game. Texas Christian and star quarterback Sammy Baugh took on Marquette, winning 16–6, but the game lost money even though some 17,000 attended. Nonetheless, Sanford persevered, and in 1938 the game made a profit as Rice defeated Byron White's Colorado 28–14 in front of a crowd of 32,000.

Some 40,000 attended the 1939 match between Saint Mary's College of California and Texas Tech, with the Gaels upsetting the undefeated Red Raiders 20–13.

=== 1940s ===
In 1940, an underdog Clemson team surprised the Boston College Eagles 6–3, in the first and only appearance at the Cotton Bowl Classic by Tigers coach Frank Howard. Attendance at this game was given as 20,000. Later that year, a group of prominent Dallas citizens took over the staging of the game as the Cotton Bowl Athletic Association. A few months later, the CBAA became an agency of the Southwest Conference. From 1941 to 1994, the SWC's champion hosted the Cotton Bowl Classic.

In 1943, The Texas Longhorns represented the SWC in their first ever bowl game against a highly ranked Georgia Tech team at the time. Prior to the game, sportswriters boasted that Texas did not belong in the same league as Georgia Tech. Texas proved the public wrong by defeating the Yellow Jackets 14–7 in what was mostly a defensive battle. This Cotton Bowl was the first bowl appearance for Texas as the Longhorns would go on to appear in a record 22 Cotton Bowls, the most of any team.

In 1946, Missouri was defeated by Texas, despite the 4th quarter work of freshman fullback Robert (Bob) Lee Clodfelter, who was to mature under Weeb Ewbank at Washington University in St. Louis the next three years.

In 1947 LSU and Arkansas played in front of 38,000 people to a scoreless tie in what would later become known as the "Ice Bowl." LSU got the better of Arkansas most of the game, but the game truly belonged to the weatherman.

In 1948 Penn State, in a bowl game for the first time in 25 years, played Dallas' SMU to a 13–13 tie. Because none of the Dallas hotels would provide accommodations for the two African-American members of the Penn State team, the Penn State team ended up staying at a Naval Air Station 14 miles from Dallas. This was the first interracial game played at the Cotton Bowl Stadium.

=== 1950s ===
The 1953 Cotton Bowl would be a rematch of the 1951 bowl game as Texas and Tennessee played for the second time. Texas defensive stars shut out the Vols 16–0 as the Longhorns avenged the previous meeting when Tennessee beat Texas 20–14.

The 1954 Cotton Bowl Classic featured one of the most famous plays in college football history. Rice's Dickey Moegle (last name spelling later changed to "Maegle") began a run around end from his team's 5-yard line and down the open field. Alabama's Tommy Lewis jumped off the bench and tackled Moegle. The referee, Cliff Shaw, saw what happened and signaled touchdown even though Moegle was "tackled" at the 42-yard line.

The 1957 Classic matched the TCU Horned Frogs against the Jim Brown-led Syracuse Orangemen. Brown rushed for 135 yards, scored three touchdowns and kicked three extra points but a fourth-quarter blocked extra point by TCU's Chico Mendoza proved the margin of victory as TCU won, 28–27. TCU QB Chuck Curtis passed for 174 yards, threw for two touchdowns and rushed for another to lead the Frogs.

=== 1960s ===
In 1960, Syracuse defeated Texas 23–14 to win the national championship. Syracuse was led by bowl MVP Ernie Davis, who ran for one touchdown, caught a Cotton Bowl Classic record 87-yard touchdown, and intercepted a pass leading to a third touchdown. There was a brawl on the field just before the end of the first half; some said it was because of Texas taking cheap shots at Ernie Davis. The University of Texas president Logan Wilson called for an NCAA hearing on the fight after the game. Syracuse Athletic Director Lew Andreas asserted that no one from his university had accused Texas of dirty play, and attributed those claims to members of the media. The issue was dropped shortly thereafter. In 1961, Davis became the first black athlete to win the Heisman Trophy, but died of leukemia before his pro career could begin.

Duke defeated Arkansas 7–6 in the 1961 game. Duke scored with 2:45 remaining and recovered a fumble on the ensuing series to win the game.

In 1962, Texas would again be selected to play in the Cotton Bowl after winning another SWC crown. This time the Longhorns faced a highly talented Mississippi Rebels team. The game was a low scoring meeting that came down to the final quarter as Texas won 12–7.

The 1963 game featured the returning Texas Longhorns and the LSU Tigers, who, like Mississippi, were from the SEC. Lynn Amedee's 23-yard field goal gave the Tigers a 3–0 halftime lead after Texas had missed their own which led to an 80-yard drive. This was the first field goal in the Classic since 1942. Amedee recovered a Longhorn fumble at the 37 early in the third quarter and Jimmy Field scored 5 plays later on a touchdown run. Buddy Hamic recovered a Longhorn fumble to set up an Amedee field goal 13 plays later as the Tigers shut the Longhorns out.

In 1964, No. 1 Texas completed an undefeated season by defeating No. 2 Navy (led by Heisman Trophy winner and future Dallas Cowboys quarterback Roger Staubach). The game was played six weeks after the assassination of John F. Kennedy (coincidentally, a retired Naval officer) in Dallas. The 1964 game is the second bowl game in college football history to pair the No. 1 and No. 2 teams in the nation (the 1963 Rose Bowl being the first).

In 1965, the Arkansas Razorbacks took an undefeated record (10–0) into the Classic versus a 9–1 Nebraska Cornhuskers team. Although Alabama had been awarded the AP and UPI (Coaches) polls national titles before the bowl games (which was standard at that time), Arkansas still had a chance to claim a share of the national championship with a victory over Nebraska. After a hard-fought defensive battle, the Hogs prevailed 10–7. That victory, coupled with an Alabama loss in the Orange Bowl to Texas (a team Arkansas defeated in Austin, Texas.), gave Arkansas the Grantland Rice Trophy emblematic of the national championship awarded by the Football Writers Association of America (FWAA).

In the 1966 game, Arkansas put its 22-game winning streak at risk playing LSU, who defeated the Razorbacks, 14–7.

The 1967 game was moved to Saturday, December 31, 1966, due to the Dallas Cowboys hosting the NFL Championship Game at the stadium on New Year's Day, a Sunday. The other major bowl games that year—the Rose Bowl, Sugar Bowl, and Orange Bowl—were played on Monday, January 2.

The 1968 game saw SWC champs Texas A&M, led by coach Gene Stallings defeat former A&M head coach Bear Bryant and the Alabama Crimson Tide. Stallings was one of Bryant's "Junction Boys" as well as a former assistant, and would eventually go on to coach the Tide. After the Aggies defeated the Tide 20–16, Bryant embraced Stallings and carried him off the field.

In 1969, Texas was off and running with its new offensive formation, the Wishbone. After dismantling all opponents of the 1968 season, Texas won the SWC crown again and this time faced the Tennessee Volunteers, in what was a lopsided win for Texas with almost 400 rushing yards. Texas won 36–13.

=== 1970s ===
The 1970 game featured Notre Dame's return to bowl games after a 45-year self-imposed ban. When the Irish made that decision, 9–1 LSU was overlooked for the game, and the Tigers stayed home instead. The Irish, led by quarterback Joe Theismann, faced top-ranked and undefeated Texas. Notre Dame led 17–14 late in the fourth quarter, but the Longhorns scored a late touchdown to clinch a 21–17 victory and an undisputed national championship. The same two teams met the next year, but this time, the Irish ended the Longhorns' 30-game winning streak with a 24–11 victory, denying Texas the Associated Press national championship (the Longhorns had already clinched the regular season championship in the UPI poll, a pre-bowl poll until the 1974 season; Nebraska won the AP title). Texas and Notre Dame met again in the 1978 game, with the Longhorns again top-ranked, only to see the Irish and quarterback Joe Montana roll to a 38–10 victory. The Irish vaulted from fifth to first in the final polls with the victory.

The 1973 game featured Texas and Alabama once again playing in a bowl game. Alabama led 13–10 going into the 4th quarter when Texas quarterback, Alan Lowry, ran the bootleg to perfection and scrambled 32 yards for the go-ahead touchdown. Again, Texas defeated Alabama and Bear Bryant, 17–13.

The 1976 Cotton Bowl showcased SWC co-Champ Arkansas against SEC stalwart Georgia. The Razorbacks had beaten No. 2 Texas A&M in a blowout to force a tie for the conference crown, and opened the door for Arkansas to stroll to Dallas on New Year's Day. After the Bulldogs jumped out to a 10–0 lead, the Hogs came roaring back, scoring 31 unanswered points, and defeating Georgia, 31–10. Arkansas finished the season 10–2.

The 1977 Cotton Bowl featured SWC Champions Houston Cougars, who were entering the Cotton Bowl for the first time, against the undefeated Maryland Terrapins. Houston won 30–21, handing the Terps their only loss of the year.

The 1979 Cotton Bowl Classic, nicknamed the Chicken Soup Game, featured one of the most historic comebacks in bowl history. Notre Dame trailed Houston 34–12 midway through the fourth quarter. Thanks to a blocked punt and the brilliance of future NFL Hall of Famer Joe Montana, the Irish rallied to win 35–34, their second consecutive Cotton Bowl Classic victory.

=== 1980s ===
The 1982 game between Texas and Alabama would be the final time that Bear Bryant would face the Longhorns. Having lost to Texas in all meetings prior, Alabama went into the fourth quarter ahead 10–0 and it would appear that the Bear would finally get a win over Texas while at Alabama. But the Longhorns scored their first points with a quarterback draw by Robert Brewer on a 3rd-and-long with 10:38 remaining. On Texas' next possession, Terry Orr scored from eight yards out to cap an 11-play, 80-yard drive to put the Longhorns up 14–10 with 2:05 remaining. Alabama's Joey Jones returned the ensuing kickoff to the Texas 38-yard line, and Tide quarterback Walter Lewis took over with 1:54 left. On the very next play, UT's William Graham picked off a Lewis pass at the one. The Longhorns took a safety to insure better field position and Texas once again stunned Alabama and the Bear with a 14–12 victory.

The 1984 game featured No. 7 Georgia of the SEC against undefeated No. 2 Texas of the SWC. Texas led 9–3 with more than four minutes to play in a battle of field goals between Georgia's Kevin Butler and Texas' Jeff Ward. A Chip Andrews (Georgia) punt was muffed by Texas defensive back Craig Curry late in the fourth quarter, then Georgia quarterback John Lastinger ran 17 yards for a touchdown with 3:22 left to play to capture a 10–9 victory, costing the Longhorns a possible national title.

The 1989 game between UCLA and Arkansas was highly publicized in the Dallas area because Bruin quarterback Troy Aikman was expected to be the top pick in the 1989 NFL draft; the first pick was held by the Dallas Cowboys. Much was made of Cowboys longtime head coach Tom Landry watching Aikman practice at Texas Stadium, UCLA's practice facility for game preparation. Landry never got to draft Aikman, because he was fired the next month, but his successor, Jimmy Johnson, did. UCLA and Aikman won, 17–3.

Quarterbacks who have played in the Cotton Bowl Classic include Sammy Baugh, Davey O'Brien, Babe Parilli, Bobby Layne, Norm Van Brocklin, Y. A. Tittle, Bart Starr, Roger Staubach, Ken Stabler, Joe Theismann, Joe Montana, Dan Marino, Doug Flutie, Troy Aikman, and Eli Manning.

Three of the four Heisman Trophy winners from the 1984–87 seasons finished their college career in the Cotton Bowl Classic: Doug Flutie for Boston College in January 1985, Bo Jackson of Auburn in 1986, and Tim Brown of Notre Dame in 1988.

Brown and fellow Heisman winner Davey O'Brien, who played in the 1937 Cotton Bowl, both attended nearby Woodrow Wilson High School in the Lakewood area. "Woodrow" became the first high school ever to produce two Heisman winners.

=== 1990s ===
For 53 years, the SWC champion played as the home team in the Cotton Bowl Classic, a tie-in which continued through the 1994 season. Until the mid-1980s, the contest was almost universally counted as a major New Year's Day bowl. However, by the late 1980s, the Cotton Bowl Classic's prestige had fallen significantly. During the 1980s, many SWC teams were left ineligible for postseason play due to NCAA probations for rule violations. Also, the conference's quality of play suffered a marked decline. The SWC champion lost the last seven times in which it received an automatic bid to the game, and the last national champion for almost four decades to play in the Cotton Bowl Classic was Notre Dame in 1977 (eventual national champions Alabama and Clemson would later play in the Cotton Bowl after the 2015 and 2018 seasons, respectively). Finally, the Cotton Bowl Classic was played outdoors during cold weather on occasion (most notably the 1979 game).

Meanwhile, the Fiesta Bowl, unhindered by conference tie-ins and played in generally warm weather, propelled itself to major-bowl status by attracting national championship contenders, most notably with its January 1987 matchup between Penn State and Miami. In the minds of many fans, the Fiesta replaced the Cotton as a major bowl. Despite this, the Cotton Bowl Classic still retained enough prestige that it was included as one of the top bowls in the Bowl Coalition when it was formed in 1992. However, in 1995, the new Bowl Alliance (the predecessor of the BCS) chose to include the Fiesta over the Cotton in its rotation. While it was still capable of landing Top 10 teams, it was no longer in a position to decide the national championship. In 18 of the 21 seasons since 1995, the Cotton Bowl has featured two ranked opponents. In the other three seasons, one of the teams was ranked (2002, 2003, and 2010).

In 1995, the SWC gave up control of the Cotton Bowl Classic as part of its planned dissolution after the season. From 1999 to 2014, the Cotton Bowl Classic had the second pick from the Big 12 after the Bowl Alliance and its successor, the Bowl Championship Series–usually the championship game loser or a division runner-up.

From 1996 to 1998, the other participant was either the champion of the Western Athletic Conference or the runner-up of the Pac-10 Conference. In 1996, the No. 5 BYU Cougars joined Notre Dame as the only programs outside of a major conference to play in the Cotton Bowl in the modern era, defeating the Kansas State Wildcats 19–15, winning an NCAA record 14th game, and finishing the season ranked fifth in the country with a 14–1 record.

In 1999, the Cotton Bowl arranged for a team from the Southeastern Conference to be the Big 12 opponent, and Southwestern Bell (now AT&T) began sponsoring the event. More often than not, the SEC representative was the runner-up from the West Division. However, Tennessee appeared in 2001 and 2005, and Missouri appeared in 2014.

=== 2000s ===
Through 2008, the Cotton Bowl Classic continued to be played on New Year's Day (except in 2004 and 2006, when the game was moved to January 2) and was usually the second game of the day to kick off, generally following the Outback Bowl.

This decade was kicked off in grand fashion, as two former Southwest Conference rivals faced off in the 2000 Classic. The Arkansas Razorbacks, now a member of the SEC (as of 1992), and Texas Longhorns, now a member of the Big XII (as of 1996) faced off in the first college football game of the last year of the 20th Century. After a lackluster first half ended with the game tied 3–3, the Razorbacks opened things up, led by Offensive MVP running back Cedric Cobbs. Arkansas beat their former hated rival, 27–6, holding the Longhorns to negative yards rushing, and sacking the Texas QB a bowl-record 8 times.

The 2003 Cotton Bowl Classic saw a rematch between the Texas Longhorns and the LSU Tigers. LSU led at the half 17–7 however Roy Williams of Texas had a tremendous breakout in the second half to lead Texas to victory over the Tigers, 35–20. The 2004 Cotton Bowl Classic saw the return of the Mississippi Rebels, whose last appearance in the Cotton Bowl Classic was a 12–7 loss to Texas in 1962. The 2004 Cotton Bowl Classic would also be New York Giants quarterback Eli Manning's last college football game. Manning led his team to beat Oklahoma State 31–28.

The 2007 Cotton Bowl Classic was between Auburn Tigers and the Nebraska Cornhuskers; Auburn won 17–14.

In the 2008 Cotton Bowl Classic, Missouri's running back Tony Temple broke the bowl game rushing record by gaining 281 yards on 24 carries. (The record was previously held by Rice's Dickey Maegle, who had rushed for 265 yards.) Missouri beat Arkansas 38–7.

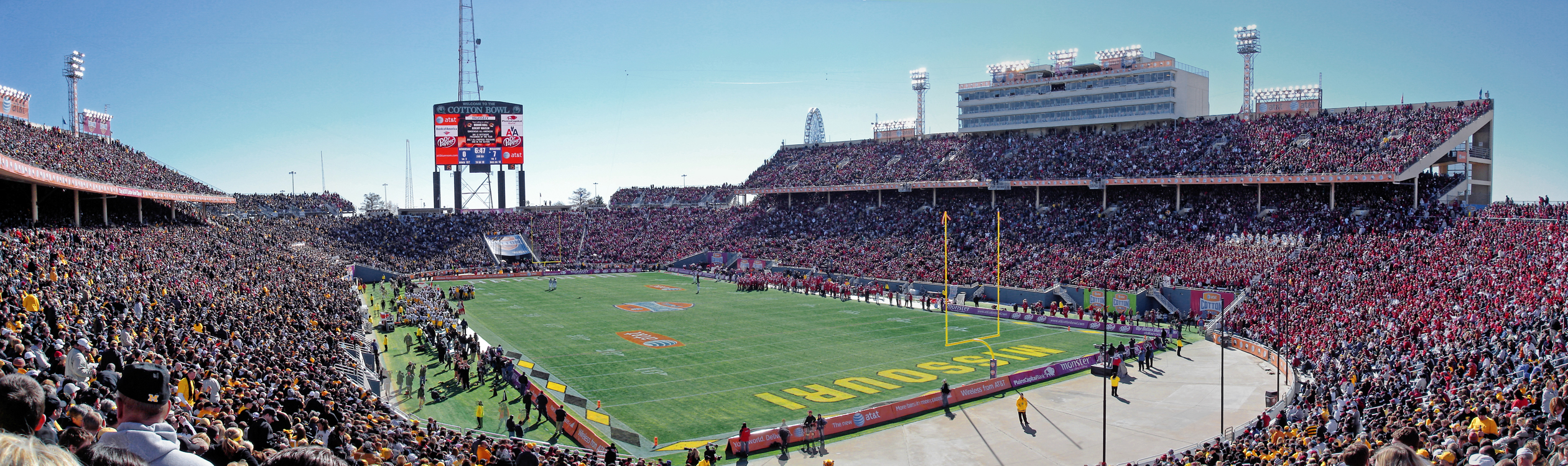
Panoramic view of the 2008 Cotton Bowl Classic between Missouri and Arkansas

In April 2008, Cotton Bowl Classic officials announced that in 2009 and 2010 the game would be moved from its traditional start time of 10 a.m. CST on January 1 to 1 p.m. CST on January 2.

In the final Cotton Bowl Classic game to be held in the Cotton Bowl stadium, the 8–4, No. 20 Ole Miss Rebels defeated the 11–1, No. 7 Texas Tech Red Raiders, 47–34. Tech quarterback Graham Harrell broke the NCAA record in this game for most touchdown passes thrown by anyone in Cotton Bowl Classic history.

=== 2010s ===
In 2010, the Cotton Bowl Classic moved to the new Cowboys Stadium (now AT&T Stadium) in Arlington, as part of a bid by bowl officials to make it part of the BCS in 2011. The Cotton Bowl had recently been remodeled and expanded to over 92,000 seats as part of a long-term drive to regain major status for the bowl game. However, Dallas' frequently cold January weather had been a longstanding concern, and was thought to have hampered any prospect of upgrading the game to the BCS. In contrast, the new stadium would offer top amenities and a retractable roof. A new four-year agreement between the BCS and ESPN had forestalled any possibility of the Cotton Bowl Classic joining the BCS until 2015 at the earliest. Later findings that the Fiesta Bowl reimbursed employees more than $46,000 for political contributions could have opened the door for the Cotton Bowl to replace the Fiesta in the BCS bowl rotation; however, the Fiesta Bowl did not lose its BCS rotation.

In the 2010 Cotton Bowl Classic played between the Oklahoma State Cowboys and the Ole Miss Rebels at the new Cowboys Stadium, the Rebels shut down the high scoring Cowboys offense to win the 74th annual Cotton Bowl Classic 21–7.

In 2010, the Cotton Bowl celebrated its 75th anniversary with a new logo dedicated to the yearlong celebration. Texas A&M played Louisiana State University in the 2011 AT&T Cotton Bowl Classic on January 7, 2011. LSU would beat Texas A&M 41–24. This was the first Cotton Bowl Classic to be played in prime time, as well as the latest calendar date for the game.

In the 2012 match-up, the Arkansas Razorbacks defeated the Kansas State Wildcats 29–16. It was a BCS-worthy game, featuring two Top 10 teams. The game was highlighted by Razorback Joe Adams punt return of 51 yards for a touchdown in the second quarter, to give Arkansas early command. It was the first punt returned for a touchdown in the Cotton Bowl Classic since former Razorback Lance Alworth did it in 1961. After the Hogs posted 19 unanswered points, Kansas State responded with 16 consecutive points of their own in the second and third quarters. But the Razorbacks pulled away late in the third quarter and early fourth quarter, led by quarterback Tyler Wilson, the game's offensive MVP. Arkansas improved to 11–2 for the 2011 season, and finished ranked No. 5, while K-State fell to 10–3.

In 2013, the No. 10 Texas A&M Aggies defeated the No. 12 Oklahoma Sooners 41–13 to win the Cotton Bowl Classic and to finish the season with an 11–2 record. Johnny Manziel rushed for 229 yards during the game, a Cotton Bowl record, rushing for two touchdowns and throwing for two more. Though the halftime score was 14–13 Texas A&M, the Aggies went on to score 27 unanswered second half points to win the game.

The Cotton Bowl Classic returned to "major" bowl status in the 2014 season in conjunction with the first year of the new College Football Playoff. It will host a national semifinal once every three years (in the 2015, 2018, 2021, 2024 seasons), and in other years will host two at-large teams that did not get selected to the four-team playoff. As part of this move, television rights switched to ESPN, which also televises other games in the playoff system. The January 2015 game featured two team ranked in the top ten for the first time in 20 seasons; the No. 8 Michigan State Spartans of the Big Ten Conference and the No. 5 Baylor Bears of the Big 12 Conference. The Spartans beat the Bears by a score of 42–41 to claim the school's first-ever Cotton Bowl Classic championship. The 2017 game saw the No. 15 Western Michigan Broncos of the Mid-American Conference (MAC) meet the No. 9 Wisconsin Badgers of the Big Ten Conference. The Badgers beat the previously undefeated Broncos, 24–16. The Broncos were the first team from the MAC to participate in the Cotton Bowl Classic.

== Sponsorship ==
From 1989 until 1995, the game was sponsored by Mobil Oil and known as the Mobil Cotton Bowl Classic. From 1996 to 2013, the game was sponsored by Southwestern Bell Corporation; however, it went through several name changes, first in 2000 when the firm adopted a standardized "SBC" branding reflecting its name it adopted in 1995, SBC Communications, and since 2006, after their acquisition of AT&T Corporation, and its subsequent name change to AT&T Inc., as the AT&T Cotton Bowl Classic.

On October 15, 2014, ESPN.com reported that AT&T would no longer sponsor the Cotton Bowl since it already holds the naming rights to the stadium in which it is played. On November 7, 2014, it was announced that Goodyear would become the new sponsor of the game, now known for sponsorship reasons as the Goodyear Cotton Bowl Classic.

== Venues ==
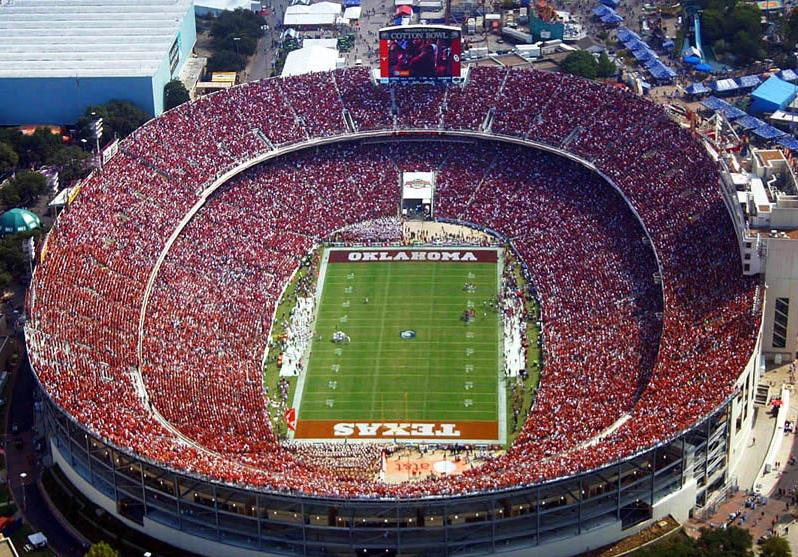
Cotton Bowl Stadium

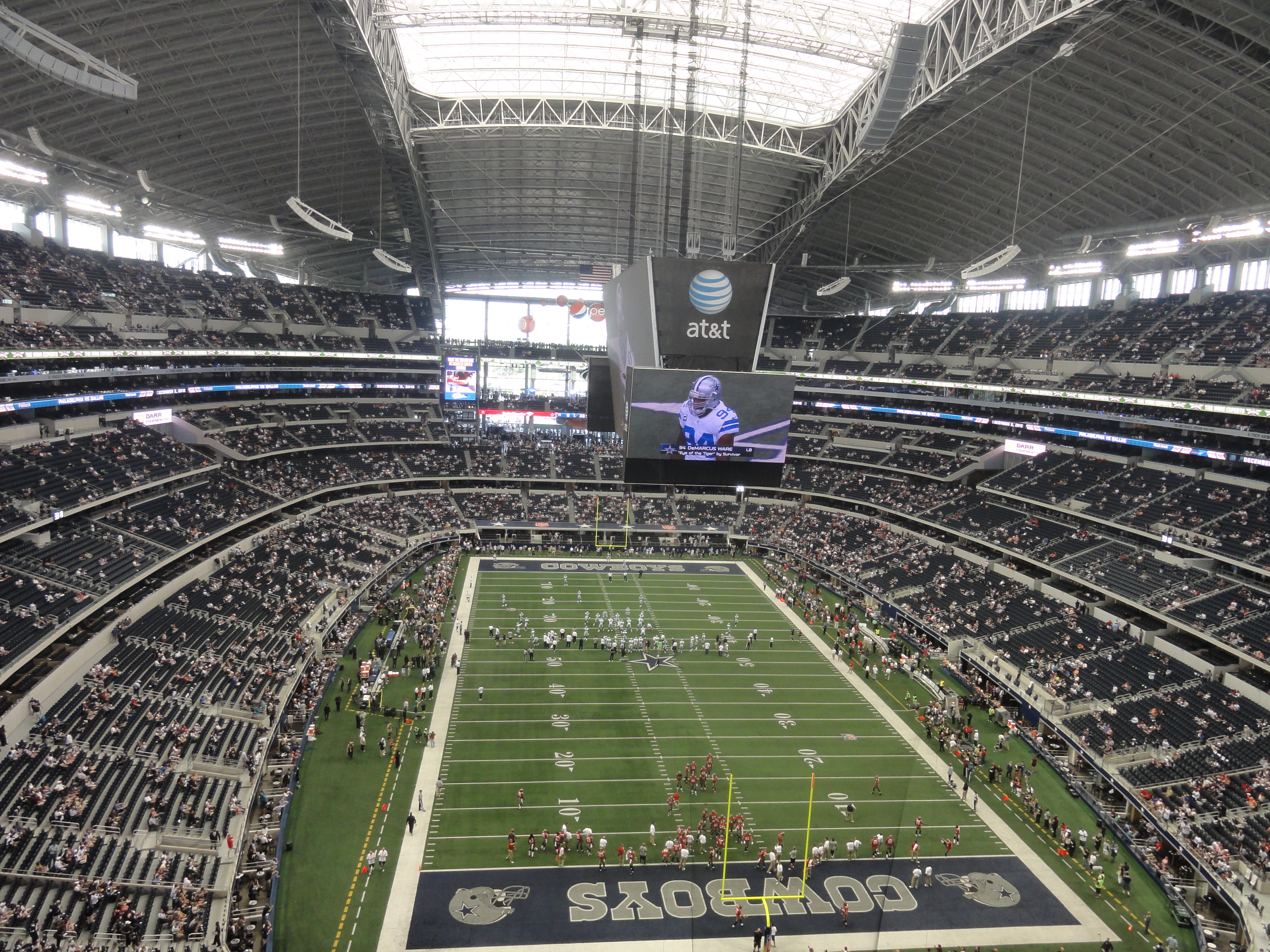
AT&T Stadium

=== Cotton Bowl ===
The Cotton Bowl is a stadium which opened in 1930 and became known as "The House That Doak Built" due to the immense crowds that former SMU running back Doak Walker drew to the stadium during his college career in the late 1940s. Originally known as the Fair Park Bowl, it is located in Fair Park, site of the State Fair of Texas. The Cotton Bowl Classic called its namesake home since the bowl's inception in 1937 until the 2010 game. The NFL's Dallas Cowboys called the Cotton Bowl home for 11 years, from the team's formation in 1960 until 1971, when the Cowboys moved to Texas Stadium. Although not the first established bowl game, the Cotton Bowl is a play on the phrase "cotton boll." Texas is the leading producer of cotton in the United States.

=== AT&T Stadium ===
AT&T Stadium, formerly Cowboys Stadium, is a domed stadium with a retractable roof in Arlington, Texas. After failed negotiations to return the Cowboys to the Cotton Bowl, Jerry Jones along with the city of Arlington, Texas funded the stadium at a cost of $1.15 billion. It was completed on May 29, 2009, and seats 80,000, but is expandable to seat up to 100,000. AT&T Stadium is the largest domed stadium in the world.

A highlight of AT&T Stadium is its center-hung high-definition television screen, the second largest in the world. The 160 by 72 feet (49 by 22 m), 11,520-square-foot (1,070 m^{2}) scoreboard surpasses the 8,736 ft^{2} (812 m^{2}) screen that opened in 2009 at the renovated Kauffman Stadium in Kansas City, Missouri.

== Game results ==
All rankings are taken from the AP poll (inaugurated in 1936), before each game was played.

Date played	Winning team		Losing team		Attnd.	Notes
January 1, 1937	No. 16 TCU	16	No. 20 Marquette	6	17,000	notes
January 1, 1938	Rice	28	Colorado	14	37,000	notes
January 2, 1939	Saint Mary's (CA)	20	No. 11 Texas Tech	13	40,000	notes
January 1, 1940	Clemson	6	Boston College	3	20,000	notes
January 1, 1941	No. 6 Texas A&M	13	No. 12 Fordham	12	45,500	notes
January 1, 1942	No. 20 Alabama	29	No. 9 Texas A&M	21	38,000	notes
January 1, 1943	No. 11 Texas	14	Georgia Tech	7	36,000	notes
January 1, 1944	No. 14 Texas	7	Randolph Field	7	15,000	notes
January 1, 1945	Oklahoma A&M	34	TCU	0	37,000	notes
January 1, 1946	No. 10 Texas	40	Missouri	27	45,000	notes
January 1, 1947	No. 8 LSU	0	No. 16 Arkansas	0	38,000	notes
January 1, 1948	No. 10 SMU	13	No. 18 Penn State	13	43,000	notes
January 1, 1949	No. 10 SMU	21	No. 9 Oregon	13	69,000	notes
January 2, 1950	No. 5 Rice	27	No. 16 North Carolina	13	75,347	notes
January 1, 1951	No. 4 Tennessee	20	No. 3 Texas	14	75,349	notes
January 1, 1952	No. 15 Kentucky	20	No. 11 TCU	7	75,347	notes
January 1, 1953	No. 10 Texas	16	No. 8 Tennessee	0	75,504	notes
January 1, 1954	No. 6 Rice	28	No. 13 Alabama	6	75,504	notes
January 1, 1955	Georgia Tech	14	No. 10 Arkansas	6	75,504	notes
January 2, 1956	No. 10 Ole Miss	14	No. 6 TCU	13	75,504	notes
January 1, 1957	No. 14 TCU	28	No. 8 Syracuse	27	61,500–68,000	notes
January 1, 1958	No. 5 Navy	20	No. 8 Rice	7	75,504	notes
January 1, 1959	No. 10 TCU	0	No. 6 Air Force	0	75,504	notes
January 1, 1960	No. 1 Syracuse	23	No. 4 Texas	14	75,504	notes
January 2, 1961	No. 10 Duke	7	No. 7 Arkansas	6	74,000	notes
January 1, 1962	No. 3 Texas	12	No. 5 Ole Miss	7	75,504	notes
January 1, 1963	No. 7 LSU	13	No. 4 Texas	0	75,504	notes
January 1, 1964	No. 1 Texas	28	No. 2 Navy	6	75,504	notes
January 1, 1965	No. 2 Arkansas	10	No. 6 Nebraska	7	75,504	notes
January 1, 1966	LSU	14	No. 2 Arkansas	7	76,200	notes
December 31, 1966	No. 4 Georgia	24	No. 10 SMU	9	75,400	notes
January 1, 1968	Texas A&M	20	No. 8 Alabama	16	75,504	notes
January 1, 1969	No. 5 Texas	36	No. 8 Tennessee	13	72,000	notes
January 1, 1970	No. 1 Texas	21	No. 9 Notre Dame	17	73,000	notes
January 1, 1971	No. 6 Notre Dame	24	No. 1 Texas	11	72,000	notes
January 1, 1972	No. 10 Penn State	30	No. 12 Texas	6	72,000	notes
January 1, 1973	No. 7 Texas	17	No. 4 Alabama	13	72,000	notes
January 1, 1974	No. 12 Nebraska	19	No. 8 Texas	3	67,500	notes
January 1, 1975	No. 7 Penn State	41	No. 12 Baylor	20	67,500–68,500	notes
January 1, 1976	No. 18 Arkansas	31	No. 12 Georgia	10	74,500	notes
January 1, 1977	No. 6 Houston	30	No. 4 Maryland	21	54,500	notes
January 2, 1978	No. 5 Notre Dame	38	No. 1 Texas	10	76,601	notes
January 1, 1979	No. 10 Notre Dame	35	No. 9 Houston	34	32,500	notes
January 1, 1980	No. 8 Houston	17	No. 7 Nebraska	14	72,032	notes
January 1, 1981	No. 9 Alabama	30	No. 6 Baylor	2	74,281	notes
January 1, 1982	No. 6 Texas	14	No. 3 Alabama	12	73,243	notes
January 1, 1983	No. 4 SMU	7	No. 6 Pittsburgh	3	60,359	notes
January 2, 1984	No. 7 Georgia	10	No. 2 Texas	9	67,891	notes
January 1, 1985	No. 8 Boston College	45	Houston	28	56,522	notes
January 1, 1986	No. 11 Texas A&M	36	No. 16 Auburn	16	73,137	notes
January 1, 1987	No. 11 Ohio State	28	No. 8 Texas A&M	12	74,188	notes
January 1, 1988	No. 13 Texas A&M	35	No. 12 Notre Dame	10	73,006	notes
January 2, 1989	No. 9 UCLA	17	No. 8 Arkansas	3	74,304	notes
January 1, 1990	No. 8 Tennessee	31	No. 10 Arkansas	27	74,358	notes
January 1, 1991	No. 4 Miami (FL)	46	No. 3 Texas	3	73,521	notes
January 1, 1992	No. 5 Florida State	10	No. 9 Texas A&M	2	73,728	notes
January 1, 1993	No. 5 Notre Dame	28	No. 4 Texas A&M	3	71,615	notes
January 1, 1994	No. 4 Notre Dame	24	No. 7 Texas A&M	21	69,855	notes
January 2, 1995	No. 21 USC	55	Texas Tech	14	70,218	notes
January 1, 1996	No. 7 Colorado	38	No. 12 Oregon	6	58,214	notes
January 1, 1997	No. 5 BYU	19	No. 14 Kansas State	15	71,928	notes
January 1, 1998	No. 5 UCLA	29	No. 20 Texas A&M	23	59,215	notes
January 1, 1999	No. 20 Texas	38	No. 25 Mississippi State	11	72,611	notes
January 1, 2000	No. 24 Arkansas	27	No. 14 Texas	6	72,723	notes
January 1, 2001	No. 11 Kansas State	35	No. 21 Tennessee	21	63,465	notes
January 1, 2002	No. 10 Oklahoma	10	Arkansas	3	72,955	notes
January 1, 2003	No. 9 Texas	35	LSU	20	70,817	notes
January 2, 2004	No. 16 Ole Miss	31	No. 21 Oklahoma State	28	73,928	notes
January 1, 2005	No. 15 Tennessee	38	No. 22 Texas A&M	7	75,704	notes
January 2, 2006	No. 8 Alabama	13	No. 20 Texas Tech	10	74,222	notes
January 1, 2007	No. 10 Auburn	17	No. 22 Nebraska	14	66,777	notes
January 1, 2008	No. 7 Missouri	38	No. 25 Arkansas	7	73,114	notes
January 2, 2009	No. 20 Ole Miss	47	No. 8 Texas Tech	34	88,175	notes
January 2, 2010	Ole Miss	21	No. 21 Oklahoma State	7	77,928	notes
January 7, 2011	No. 11 LSU	41	No. 18 Texas A&M	24	83,514	notes
January 6, 2012	No. 7 Arkansas	29	No. 11 Kansas State	16	80,956	notes
January 4, 2013	No. 9 Texas A&M	41	No. 11 Oklahoma	13	87,025	notes
January 3, 2014	No. 9 Missouri	41	No. 13 Oklahoma State	31	72,690	notes
January 1, 2015	No. 7 Michigan State	42	No. 4 Baylor	41	71,464	notes
December 31, 2015^{SF}	No. 2 Alabama	38	No. 3 Michigan State	0	82,812	notes
January 2, 2017	No. 8 Wisconsin	24	No. 12 Western Michigan	16	59,615	notes
December 29, 2017	No. 5 Ohio State	24	No. 8 USC	7	67,510	notes
December 29, 2018^{SF}	No. 2 Clemson	30	No. 3 Notre Dame	3	72,183	notes
December 28, 2019	No. 13 Penn State	53	No. 15 Memphis	39	54,828	notes
December 30, 2020	No. 8 Oklahoma	55	No. 10 Florida	20	17,323	notes
December 31, 2021^{SF}	No. 1 Alabama	27	No. 4 Cincinnati	6	76,313	notes
January 2, 2023	No. 14 Tulane	46	No. 8 USC	45	55,329	notes
December 29, 2023	No. 9 Missouri	14	No. 7 Ohio State	3	70,114	notes
January 10, 2025^{SF}	No. 6 Ohio State	28	No. 4 Texas	14	74,527	notes
December 31, 2025^{QF}	No. 10 Miami (FL)	24	No. 3 Ohio State	14	71,323	notes

^QF Denotes College Football Playoff quarterfinal game
^SF Denotes College Football Playoff semifinal game

== Most Outstanding Player awards ==
Date played	MVP(s)	Team	Position
January 1, 1937	Ki Aldrich	TCU	C
January 1, 1937	Sammy Baugh	TCU	QB
January 1, 1937	L.D. "Dutch" Meyer	TCU	K
January 1, 1938	Ernie Lain	Rice	HB
January 1, 1938	Byron "Whizzer" White	Colorado	QB
January 1, 1939	Jerry Dowd	St. Mary's (CA)	C
January 1, 1939	Elmer Tarbox	Texas Tech	HB
January 1, 1940	Banks McFadden	Clemson	B
January 1, 1941	Charles Henke	Texas A&M	G
January 1, 1941	John Kimbrough	Texas A&M	FB
January 1, 1941	Chip Roult	Texas A&M	T
January 1, 1941	Lou DeFilippo	Fordham	C
January 1, 1941	Joe Ungerer	Fordham	T
January 1, 1942	Jimmy Nelson	Alabama	HB
January 1, 1942	Holt Rast	Alabama	E
January 1, 1942	Don Whitmire	Alabama	T
January 1, 1942	Martin Ruby	Texas A&M	T
January 1, 1943	Jack Freeman	Texas	G
January 1, 1943	Roy McKay	Texas	B
January 1, 1943	Stanley Mauldin	Texas	T
January 1, 1943	Harvey Hardy	Georgia Tech	G
January 1, 1943	Jack Marshall	Georgia Tech	E
January 1, 1944	Martin Ruby	Randolph Field	T
January 1, 1944	Glenn Dobbs	Randolph Field	QB
January 1, 1944	Joe Parker	Texas	E
January 1, 1945	Neill Armstrong	Oklahoma A&M	E
January 1, 1945	Bob Fenimore	Oklahoma A&M	RB
January 1, 1945	Ralph Foster	Oklahoma A&M	DT
January 1, 1946	Hub Bechtol	Texas	E
January 1, 1946	Bobby Layne	Texas	B
January 1, 1946	Jim Kekeris	Missouri	T
January 1, 1947	Alton Baldwin	Arkansas	E
January 1, 1947	Y. A. Tittle	LSU	QB
January 1, 1948	Steve Suhey	Penn State	G
January 1, 1948	Doak Walker	SMU	RB
January 1, 1949	Kyle Rote	SMU	RB
January 1, 1949	Doak Walker	SMU	RB
January 1, 1949	Brad Ecklund	Oregon	C
January 1, 1949	Norm Van Brocklin	Oregon	QB
January 2, 1950	Billy Burkhalter	Rice	HB
January 2, 1950	Joe Watson	Rice	C
January 2, 1950	James Williams	Rice	E
January 1, 1951	Andy Kozar	Tennessee	FB
January 1, 1951	Hank Lauricella	Tennessee	HB
January 1, 1951	Horace "Bud" Sherrod	Tennessee	DE
January 1, 1951	Bud McFadin	Texas	G
January 1, 1952	Emery Clark	Kentucky	HB
January 1, 1952	Ray Correll	Kentucky	G
January 1, 1952	Vito "Babe" Parilli	Kentucky	QB
January 1, 1952	Keith Flowers	TCU	FB
January 1, 1953	Richard Ochoa	Texas	FB
January 1, 1953	Harley Sewell	Texas	G
January 1, 1953	Bob Griesbach	Tennessee	LB
January 1, 1954	Richard Chapman	Rice	T
January 1, 1954	Dan Hart	Rice	E
January 1, 1954	Dickey Maegle	Rice	HB
January 1, 1955	George Humphreys	Georgia Tech	FB
January 1, 1955	Bud Brooks	Arkansas	G
January 2, 1956	Buddy Alliston	Ole Miss	G
January 2, 1956	Eagle Day	Ole Miss	QB
January 1, 1957	Norman Hamilton	TCU	T
January 1, 1957	Jim Brown	Syracuse	HB
January 1, 1958	Tom Forrestal	Navy	QB
January 1, 1958	Tony Stremic	Navy	G
January 1, 1959	Dave Phillips	Air Force	T
January 1, 1959	Jack Spikes	TCU	FB
January 1, 1960	Ernie Davis	Syracuse	HB
January 1, 1960	Maurice Doke	Texas	G
January 2, 1961	Dwight Bumgarner	Duke	T
January 2, 1961	Lance Alworth	Arkansas	HB
January 1, 1962	Mike Cotten	Texas	QB
January 1, 1962	Bob Moses	Texas	E
January 1, 1963	Lynn Amedee	LSU	QB
January 1, 1963	Johnny Treadwell	Texas	G
January 1, 1964	Scott Appleton	Texas	T
January 1, 1964	Duke Carlisle	Texas	QB
January 1, 1965	Ronnie Caveness	Arkansas	LB
January 1, 1965	Fred Marshall	Arkansas	QB
January 1, 1966	Joe Labruzzo	LSU	TB
January 1, 1966	David McCormick	LSU	T
December 31, 1966	Kent Lawrence	Georgia	TB
December 31, 1966	George Patton	Georgia	T
January 1, 1968	Grady Allen	Texas A&M	DE
January 1, 1968	Edd Hargett	Texas A&M	QB
January 1, 1968	Bill Hobbs	Texas A&M	LB
January 1, 1969	Tom Campbell	Texas	LB
January 1, 1969	Cotton Speyrer	Texas	WR
January 1, 1969	James Street	Texas	QB
January 1, 1970	Steve Worster	Texas	FB
January 1, 1970	Bob Olson	Notre Dame	LB
January 1, 1971	Clarence Ellis	Notre Dame	CB
January 1, 1971	Eddie Phillips	Texas	QB
January 1, 1972	Bruce Bannon	Penn State	DE
January 1, 1972	Lydell Mitchell	Penn State	RB
January 1, 1973	Randy Braband	Texas	LB
January 1, 1973	Alan Lowry	Texas	QB
January 1, 1974	Tony Davis	Nebraska	TB
January 1, 1974	Wade Johnston	Texas	LB
January 1, 1975	Tom Shuman	Penn State	QB
January 1, 1975	Ken Quesenberry	Baylor	S
January 1, 1976	Ike Forte	Arkansas	HB
January 1, 1976	Hal McAfee	Arkansas	LB

Date played	MVP(s)	Team	Position
January 1, 1977	Alois Blackwell	Houston	RB
January 1, 1977	Mark Mohr	Houston	CB
January 2, 1978	Vagas Ferguson	Notre Dame	RB
January 2, 1978	Bob Golic	Notre Dame	LB
January 1, 1979	Joe Montana	Notre Dame	QB
January 1, 1979	David Hodge	Houston	LB
January 1, 1980	Terry Elston	Houston	QB
January 1, 1980	David Hodge	Houston	LB
January 1, 1981	Warren Lyles	Alabama	NG
January 1, 1981	Major Ogilvie	Alabama	RB
January 1, 1982	Robert Brewer	Texas	QB
January 1, 1982	Robbie Jones	Alabama	LB
January 1, 1983	Wes Hopkins	SMU	SS
January 1, 1983	Lance McIlhenny	SMU	QB
January 1, 1984	John Lastinger	Georgia	QB
January 1, 1984	Jeff Leiding	Texas	LB
January 1, 1985	Bill Romanowski	Boston College	LB
January 1, 1985	Steve Strachan	Boston College	FB
January 1, 1986	Domingo Bryant	Texas A&M	SS
January 1, 1986	Bo Jackson	Auburn	TB
January 1, 1987	Chris Spielman	Ohio State	LB
January 1, 1987	Roger Vick	Texas A&M	FB
January 1, 1988	Adam Bob	Texas A&M	LB
January 1, 1988	Bucky Richardson	Texas A&M	QB
January 2, 1989	Troy Aikman	UCLA	QB
January 2, 1989	LaSalle Harper	Arkansas	LB
January 1, 1990	Carl Pickens	Tennessee	FS
January 1, 1990	Chuck Webb	Tennessee	TB
January 1, 1991	Craig Erickson	Miami (FL)	QB
January 1, 1991	Russell Maryland	Miami (FL)	DL
January 1, 1992	Sean Jackson	Florida State	RB
January 1, 1992	Chris Crooms	Texas A&M	S
January 1, 1993	Rick Mirer	Notre Dame	QB
January 1, 1993	Devon McDonald	Notre Dame	DE
January 1, 1994	Lee Becton	Notre Dame	RB
January 1, 1994	Antonio Shorter	Texas A&M	L
January 2, 1995	Keyshawn Johnson	USC	WR
January 2, 1995	John Herpin	USC	CB
January 1, 1996	Herchell Troutman	Colorado	RB
January 1, 1996	Marcus Washington	Colorado	DB
January 1, 1997	Steve Sarkisian	BYU	QB
January 1, 1997	Shay Muirbrook	BYU	LB
January 1, 1997	Kevin Lockett	Kansas State	WR
January 1, 1998	Cade McNown	UCLA	QB
January 1, 1998	Dat Nguyen	Texas A&M	LB
January 1, 1999	Ricky Williams	Texas	RB
January 1, 1999	Aaron Babino	Texas	LB
January 1, 2000	Cedric Cobbs	Arkansas	RB
January 1, 2000	D. J. Cooper	Arkansas	DT
January 1, 2001	Jonathan Beasley	Kansas State	QB
January 1, 2001	Chris L. Johnson	Kansas State	DE
January 1, 2002	Quentin Griffin	Oklahoma	RB
January 1, 2002	Roy Williams	Oklahoma	S
January 1, 2003	Roy Williams	Texas	WR
January 1, 2003	Cory Redding	Texas	DE
January 2, 2004	Eli Manning	Ole Miss	QB
January 2, 2004	Josh Cooper	Ole Miss	DE
January 1, 2005	Rick Clausen	Tennessee	QB
January 1, 2005	Justin Harrell	Tennessee	DT
January 2, 2006	Brodie Croyle	Alabama	QB
January 2, 2006	DeMeco Ryans	Alabama	LB
January 1, 2007	Courtney Taylor	Auburn	WR
January 1, 2007	Will Herring	Auburn	LB
January 1, 2008	Tony Temple	Missouri	RB
January 1, 2008	William Moore	Missouri	SS
January 2, 2009	Dexter McCluster	Ole Miss	WR
January 2, 2009	Marshay Green	Ole Miss	CB
January 2, 2010	Dexter McCluster	Ole Miss	WR
January 2, 2010	Andre Sexton	Oklahoma State	LB
January 7, 2011	Terrence Toliver	LSU	WR
January 7, 2011	Tyrann Mathieu	LSU	DB
January 6, 2012	Tyler Wilson	Arkansas	QB
January 6, 2012	Jake Bequette	Arkansas	DE
January 4, 2013	Johnny Manziel	Texas A&M	QB
January 4, 2013	Dustin Harris	Texas A&M	DB
January 3, 2014	Henry Josey	Missouri	RB
January 3, 2014	Andrew Wilson	Missouri	LB
January 1, 2015	Bryce Petty	Baylor	QB
January 1, 2015	Taylor Young	Baylor	LB
December 31, 2015	Jake Coker	Alabama	QB
December 31, 2015	Cyrus Jones	Alabama	DB
January 2, 2017	Troy Fumagalli	Wisconsin	TE
January 2, 2017	T. J. Edwards	Wisconsin	LB
December 29, 2017	J. T. Barrett	Ohio State	QB
December 29, 2017	Damon Webb	Ohio State	DB
December 29, 2018	Trevor Lawrence	Clemson	QB
December 29, 2018	Austin Bryant	Clemson	DE
December 28, 2019	Journey Brown	Penn State	RB
December 28, 2019	Micah Parsons	Penn State	OLB
December 30, 2020	Rhamondre Stevenson	Oklahoma	RB
December 30, 2020	Tre Norwood	Oklahoma	DB
December 31, 2021	Brian Robinson Jr.	Alabama	RB
December 31, 2021	Will Anderson Jr.	Alabama	LB
January 2, 2023	Tyjae Spears	Tulane	RB
January 2, 2023	Dorian Williams	Tulane	LB
December 29, 2023	Brady Cook	Missouri	QB
December 29, 2023	Johnny Walker Jr.	Missouri	DE
January 10, 2025	Will Howard	Ohio State	QB
January 10, 2025	Jack Sawyer	Ohio State	DE
December 31, 2025	Mark Fletcher Jr.	Miami (FL)	RB
December 31, 2025	Keionte Scott	Miami (FL)	CB

== Most appearances ==
Updated through the December 2025 edition (90 games, 180 total appearances).

Teams with multiple appearances

Rank	Team	Appearances	Record			
Rank	Team	Appearances	W	L	T	Pct.
1	Texas	23	11	11	1	.500
2	Texas A&M	13	5	8	0	.385
3	Arkansas	12	4	7	1	.375
4	Alabama	9	5	4	0	.556
5	Notre Dame	8	5	3	0	.625
T6	Tennessee	6	3	3	0	.500
T6	TCU	6	2	3	1	.417
T8	Ole Miss	5	4	1	0	.800
T8	Ohio State	5	3	2	0	.600
T8	LSU	5	3	1	1	.700
T11	Penn State	4	3	0	1	.875
T11	Rice	4	3	1	0	.750
T11	Missouri	4	3	1	0	.750
T11	SMU	4	2	1	1	.625
T11	Houston	4	2	2	0	.500
T11	Nebraska	4	1	3	0	.250
T11	Oklahoma State	4	1	3	0	.250
T11	Texas Tech	4	0	4	0	.000

Rank	Team	Appearances	Record			
Rank	Team	Appearances	W	L	T	Pct.
T19	Georgia	3	2	1	0	.667
T19	Oklahoma	3	2	1	0	.667
T19	USC	3	1	2	0	.333
T19	Kansas State	3	1	2	0	.333
T19	Baylor	3	0	3	0	.000
T24	Clemson	2	2	0	0	1.000
T24	UCLA	2	2	0	0	1.000
T24	Miami (FL)	2	2	0	0	1.000
T24	Auburn	2	1	1	0	.500
T24	Boston College	2	1	1	0	.500
T24	Colorado	2	1	1	0	.500
T24	Georgia Tech	2	1	1	0	.500
T24	Michigan State	2	1	1	0	.500
T24	Navy	2	1	1	0	.500
T24	Syracuse	2	1	1	0	.500
T24	Oregon	2	0	2	0	.000

Teams with a single appearance

Won (7): BYU, Duke, Florida State, Kentucky, Saint Mary's (CA), Tulane, Wisconsin
Lost (10): Cincinnati, Florida, Fordham, Marquette, Maryland, Memphis, Mississippi State, North Carolina, Pittsburgh, Western Michigan
Tied (2): Air Force, Randolph Field

- Oklahoma State's record includes one appearance when the school was known as Oklahoma A&M.

As of 2025:

- Each of the teams who were members of the Southwest Conference (SWC) sometime during 1936–1995 have appeared in at least one Cotton Bowl.
- South Carolina and Vanderbilt are the only members of the SEC that have not played in the Cotton Bowl.
- Iowa State, Kansas and West Virginia are the only members of the Big 8 or Big 12 that have not played in the Cotton Bowl. In addition, former Big 12 members Colorado, Missouri, Nebraska, and Texas A&M have all played in multiple Cotton Bowls.
- Michigan State, Ohio State, Penn State (also played in the Cotton Bowl prior to being in the Big Ten), and Wisconsin are the only Big Ten teams to have participated in the Cotton Bowl (Maryland and Nebraska participated prior to joining the conference). Prior to 2014, only one Big Ten team (Ohio State in 1987) had appeared in the Cotton Bowl.
- Texas, Texas A&M, Texas Tech, and Missouri have appeared in the Cotton Bowl as a member of three different conferences. Texas played a member of the SWC, Big 12, and SEC; Texas A&M played as a member of the SWC, Big 12, and SEC; Texas Tech played as a member of the Border Conference, SWC and Big 12; and Missouri played as a member of the Big 8, Big 12 and SEC.

== Appearances by conference ==
Updated through the December 2025 edition (90 games, 180 total appearances).

Conference	Record					Appearances by year		
Conference	Games	W	L	T	Win pct.	Won	Lost	Tied
SWC	57	24	29	4	.456	1937, 1938, 1941, 1943, 1946, 1949, 1950, 1953, 1954, 1957, 1962, 1964, 1965, 1968, 1969, 1970, 1973, 1976, 1977, 1980, 1982, 1983, 1986, 1988	1942, 1945, 1951, 1952, 1955, 1956, 1958, 1960, 1961, 1963, 1966, 1966^{D}, 1971, 1972, 1974, 1975, 1978, 1979, 1981, 1984, 1985, 1987, 1989, 1990, 1991, 1992, 1993, 1994, 1995	1944, 1947, 1948, 1959
SEC	43	25	17	1	.593	1942, 1951, 1952, 1955, 1956, 1963, 1966, 1966^{D}, 1981, 1984, 1990, 2000, 2004, 2005, 2006, 2007, 2009, 2010, 2011, 2012, 2013, 2014, 2015^{D}, 2021, 2023^{D}	1943, 1953, 1954, 1962, 1968, 1969, 1973, 1976, 1982, 1986, 1999, 2001, 2002, 2003, 2008, 2020^{D}, 2025	1947
Independents	25	13	9	3	.580	1939, 1958, 1960, 1971, 1972, 1975, 1978, 1979, 1985, 1991, 1992, 1993, 1994	1937, 1940, 1941, 1957, 1964, 1970, 1983, 1988, 2018^{D}	1944, 1948, 1959
Big 12	20	6	14	0	.300	1999, 2001, 2002, 2003, 2008, 2020^{D}	1997, 1998, 2000, 2004, 2005, 2006, 2007, 2009, 2010, 2011, 2012, 2013, 2014, 2015	
Big Ten	9	6	3	0	.667	1987, 2015, 2017, 2017^{D}, 2019^{D}, 2025	2015^{D}, 2023^{D}, 2025^{D}	
Pac-12	6	3	3	0	.500	1989, 1995, 1998	1996, 2017^{D}, 2023	
Big Eight	5	2	3	0	.400	1974, 1996	1946, 1965, 1980	
ACC	4	3	1	0	.750	1961, 2018^{D}, 2025^{D}	1977	
American	3	1	2	0	.333	2023	2019^{D}, 2021	
SoCon	2	1	1	0	.500	1940	1950	
MVC	1	1	0	0	1.000	1945		
WAC	1	1	0	0	1.000	1997		
Border	1	0	1	0	.000		1939	
MAC	1	0	1	0	.000		2017	
PCC	1	0	1	0	.000		1949	
RMAC	1	0	1	0	.000		1938	

- Games were played in the calendar year listed; in December if marked with an superscript D (such as 1966^{D}), else in January.
- Records reflect conference affiliations at the time each game was played.
- Conferences that are defunct or no longer active in FBS are marked in italics.
- The Big Eight's record includes one game when the conference was known as the Big Six.
- The Pac-12's record includes four games when the conference was known as the Pac-10. It does not include the one appearance made by Oregon as a member of the Pacific Coast Conference (PCC). Although the Pac-12 considers the PCC to be part of its own history, the two leagues were established under separate charters.

== Game records ==
Team	Performance, Team vs. Opponent	Year
Most points (one team)	55, shared by: USC vs. Texas Tech; Oklahoma vs. Florida	1995; 2020
Most points (both teams)	92, Penn State (53) vs. Memphis (39)	2019
Fewest points allowed	0, several teams—most recent: Alabama vs. Michigan State	Dec. 2015
Largest margin of victory	43, Miami, FL (46) vs. Texas (3)	1991
First downs	32, Tennessee vs. Texas A&M	2005
Rushing yards	435, Oklahoma vs. Florida	2020
Passing yards	603, Baylor vs. Michigan State	Jan. 2015
Total yards	684, Oklahoma vs. Florida	2020
Individual	Performance, Player, Team vs. Opponent	Year
Total offense	516, Johnny Manziel, Texas A&M vs. Oklahoma (229 Rush, 287 Pass)	2013
Rushing yards	281, Tony Temple, Missouri vs. Arkansas (24 att., 4 TD)	2008
Rushing TDs	4 shared by: Tony Temple, Missouri vs. Arkansas; Tyjae Spears, Tulane vs. USC	2008; Jan. 2023
Passing yards	550, Bryce Petty, Baylor vs. Michigan State (36–51–1, 3 TD)	Jan. 2015
Passing TDs	5, Caleb Williams, USC vs. Tulane	Jan. 2023
Receptions	11, Rashaun Woods, Oklahoma State vs. Ole Miss (223 yds, 1 TD)	2004
Receiving yards	223, Rashaun Woods, Oklahoma State vs. Ole Miss (11 rec., 1 TD)	2004
Receiving TDs	3, Terrence Toliver, LSU vs. Texas A&M	2011
Field goals	6, Riley Patterson, Memphis vs. Penn State	2019
Tackles	23, Keith Flowers, TCU vs. Kentucky	1952
Sacks	6, Shay Muirbrook, BYU vs. Kansas State (32 yards)	1997
Interceptions	3, Jerry Cook, Texas vs. Ole Miss (16 yards)	1962
Long Plays	Performance, Player, Team vs. Opponent	Year
Touchdown run	95, Dicky Moegle, Rice vs. Alabama	1954
Touchdown pass	87, Gerhard Schwedes to Ernie Davis, Syracuse vs. Texas; Michael Pratt to Jha'Quan Jackson, Tulane vs. USC	1960; Jan. 2023
Kickoff return	98, Earl Allen, Houston vs. Boston College (TD)	1985
Punt return	72, Jimmy Nelson, Alabama vs. Texas A&M (TD)	1942
Interception return	95, Marcus Washington, Colorado vs. Oregon (TD)	1996
Fumble return	83, Jack Sawyer, Ohio State vs. Texas (TD)	2025
Punt	84, Kyle Rote, SMU vs. Oregon	1949
Field goal	51, Riley Patterson, Memphis vs. Penn State	2019

Note: for ties, the most recent year is shown.

== Broadcasting ==
The first televised edition of the Cotton Bowl Classic was in 1953 by NBC. NBC provided coverage of the game from 1952 to 1957. In 1958, CBS began a streak of broadcasts of the event through 1992. NBC televised the game from 1993 to 1995. The Cotton Bowl returned to CBS in 1996 and remained for three years. From 1999 to 2014, the Cotton Bowl Classic was televised by Fox. As part of the College Football Playoff rotation, ESPN took over rights to the game beginning in 2015.

In 2013, Fox Deportes televised the game nationally for the first time in Spanish. The game returned to Fox Deportes in 2014. In 2015, ESPN Deportes becomes the new Spanish-language television home of the game.

The game is also broadcast nationally on radio by ESPN Radio and ESPN Deportes Radio. ESPN Radio succeeded former longtime Cotton Bowl carrier Westwood One in 2013. 2013 marked the first Spanish radio broadcast of the game.

== See also ==
- List of college bowl games
- Comerica Bank New Year's Parade, also known as the "Cotton Bowl Parade"
