= 1963 Cotton Bowl Classic =

- 27th Cotton Bowl Classic
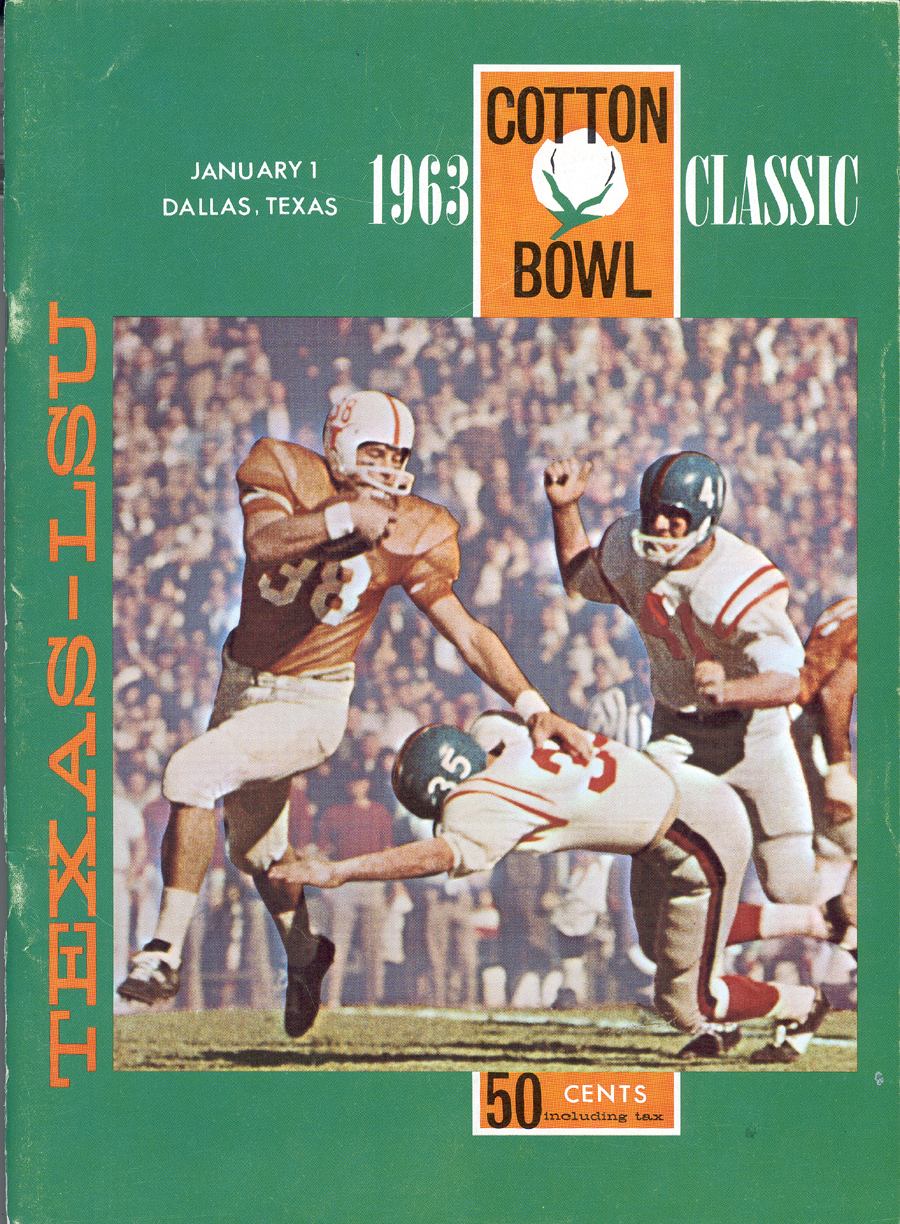
LSU Tigers	Texas Longhorns
(8–1–1)	(9–0–1)
SEC	SWC
13	0
Head coach: Charles McClendon	Head coach: Darrell Royal
AP / Coaches; 7 / 8	AP / Coaches; 4 / 4
	1	2	3	4	Total
LSU	0	3	7	3	13
Texas	0	0	0	0	0
- Date: January 1, 1963
- Season: 1962
- Stadium: Cotton Bowl
- Location: Dallas, Texas
- MVP: Lynn Amedee (LSU QB, PK); Johnny Treadwell (Texas G)
- Favorite: LSU (slight)
- Referee: Burns McKinney (SWC; split crew: SWC, SEC)
- Attendance: 75,504
- Payout: US$175,000 per team

United States TV coverage
- Network: CBS
- Announcers: Lindsey Nelson, Terry Brennan

The Cotton Bowl in Dallas, Texas, hosted the Cotton Bowl Classic.

The 1963 Cotton Bowl Classic was the 27th edition of the college football bowl game, played at the Cotton Bowl in Dallas, Texas, on Tuesday, January 1. Part of the 1962–63 bowl game season, the game featured the fourth-ranked Texas Longhorns of the Southwest Conference (SWC) and the #7 LSU Tigers of the Southeastern Conference (SEC). LSU shut out the Longhorns, 13–0.

== Teams ==
=== Texas ===
The Longhorns were making their second of three consecutive Cotton Bowl appearances after winning the Southwest Conference again. They were unbeaten, with a tie at Rice.

=== LSU ===
The Tigers, who finished third in the Southeastern Conference, lost to Ole Miss and also tied Rice. LSU had won the Orange Bowl the previous season. They were making their first Cotton Bowl appearance since 1947, a scoreless tie (against Arkansas). This was head coach Charlie McClendon's first year at LSU, where he stayed through 1979.

== Game summary ==
LSU quarterback Lynn Amedee's 23-yard field goal gave the Tigers a 3–0 halftime lead. Earlier, Texas' shoeless Tony Crosby had missed from 42 yards, which led to the scoring drive. This was the first field goal in the Cotton Bowl in 21 years.

Amedee recovered a Longhorn fumble at the 37 early in the third quarter and reserve quarterback Jimmy Field scored five plays later on a 22-yard touchdown run. Buddy Hamic recovered a Texas fumble to set up another Amedee field goal thirteen plays later, and the Tigers kept the Longhorns off the scoreboard.

=== Scoring ===
First quarter

No scoring

Second quarter

- LSU – Lynn Amedee 23-yard field goal

Third quarter

- LSU – Jimmy Field 22-yard touchdown run (Amedee kick)

Fourth quarter

- LSU – Amedee 37-yard field goal

== Statistics ==
Statistics	LSU	Texas
First downs	17	9
Yards rushing	126	80
Yards passing	133	92
Passing (C–A–I)	13–21–0	8–22–3
Total yards	259	172
Punts–Average	9–41.8	8–46.8
Fumbles–Lost	0–0	2–2
Interceptions	0	3
Penalties–Yards	1–15	4–44

== Aftermath ==
The Longhorns played in the Cotton Bowl the following year, went undefeated, and won the national championship.

The Tigers returned to the Cotton Bowl three years later in January 1966.
