= 1962 Arkansas Razorbacks football team =

American college football season

1962 Arkansas Razorbacks football

Sugar Bowl, L 13–17 vs. Ole Miss
- Conference: Southwest Conference

Ranking
- Coaches: No. 6
- AP: No. 6
- Record: 9–2 (6–1 SWC)
- Head coach: Frank Broyles (5th season)
- Captains: Billy Moore; Ray Trail
- Home stadium: Razorback Stadium; War Memorial Stadium

1962 Southwest Conference football standings
	Conf.					Overall
Team	W		L		T	W		L		T
No. 4 Texas $	6	–	0	–	1	9	–	1	–	1
No. 6 Arkansas	6	–	1	–	0	9	–	2	–	0
TCU	5	–	2	–	0	6	–	4	–	0
Texas A&M	3	–	4	–	0	3	–	7	–	0
Baylor	3	–	4	–	0	4	–	6	–	0
Rice	2	–	4	–	1	2	–	6	–	2
SMU	2	–	5	–	0	2	–	8	–	0
Texas Tech	0	–	7	–	0	1	–	9	–	0
$ – Conference champion; Rankings from AP Poll

The 1962 Arkansas Razorbacks football team represented the University of Arkansas in the Southwest Conference (SWC) during the 1962 NCAA University Division football season. In their fifth year under head coach Frank Broyles, the Razorbacks compiled a 9–2 record (6–1 against SWC opponents), finished in second place in the SWC, and outscored all opponents by a combined total of 299 to 115. The Razorbacks' only loss during the regular season came against Texas by a 7–3 score. The team was ranked #6 in both the final AP Poll and the final UPI Coaches Poll and went on to lose to Ole Miss in the 1963 Sugar Bowl by a 17–13 score.

Arkansas quarterback Billy Moore was selected by the Football Writers Association of America and the Newspaper Enterprise Association as a first-team player on the 1962 College Football All-America Team. Moore scored 14 touchdowns, which tied him with the Miami Redskins' kicker Bob Jencks in scoring. Future Razorback head coach Ken Hatfield finished second in the country in punt return yards, behind Utah State's Darrell Roberts. Razorback kicker Tom McKnelly was fourth in kick scoring, with 33 extra points and three field goals.

The Razorbacks' offensive unit averaged 5.0 yards per play and 357 yards per game, the seventh-best mark in 1962. Arkansas also averaged 28.6 points per game, the fifth-highest average nationally. Running on the Razorback defense was tough, as the unit gave up 90.7 yards per contest, the seventh-lowest total in the nation.

Despite a 9–2 record, the Razorbacks finished second in the SWC to Texas, which was 9–1–1, losing only in the Cotton Bowl Classic to LSU, 13–0.

== Schedule ==
Date	Opponent	Rank	Site	TV	Result	Attendance	Source
September 22	Oklahoma State*		War Memorial Stadium; Little Rock, AR		W 34–7	40,000	
September 29	Tulsa*		Razorback Stadium; Fayetteville, AR		W 42–14	26,000	
October 6	at TCU		Amon G. Carter Stadium; Fort Worth, TX		W 42–14	42,536	
October 13	Baylor	No. 8	Razorback Stadium; Fayetteville, AR		W 28–21	32,000	
October 20	at No. 1 Texas	No. 7	Memorial Stadium; Austin, TX (rivalry)		L 3–7	64,530	
October 27	Hardin–Simmons*	No. 9	War Memorial Stadium; Little Rock, AR		W 49–7	28,000	
November 3	at Texas A&M	No. 8	Kyle Field; College Station, TX (rivalry)		W 17–7	23,000	
November 10	Rice	No. 6	Razorback Stadium; Fayetteville, AR		W 28–14	34,000	
November 17	SMU	No. 7	War Memorial Stadium; Little Rock, AR		W 9–7	41,000	
November 24	at Texas Tech	No. 7	Jones Stadium; Lubbock, TX (rivalry)		W 34–0	16,000	
January 1	vs. No. 3 Ole Miss*	No. 6	Tulane Stadium; New Orleans, LA (Sugar Bowl, rivalry)	NBC	L 13–17	82,900	
*Non-conference game; Rankings from AP Poll released prior to the game

== Sugar Bowl ==
	1	2	3	4	Total
Razorbacks	0	3	10	0	13
Rebels	3	7	7	0	17

The 1963 Sugar Bowl matched up rivals Arkansas and Ole Miss in the Razorbacks second straight Sugar Bowl, and fourth bowl in four seasons. The Rebels also had reached four consecutive bowl games.

After each team kicked field goals, Ole Miss scored the first touchdown, a 33-yard strike from Glynn Griffing to Louis Guy that gave the Rebels a 10–3 lead. The Hogs replied with a five-yard touchdown toss from Billy Moore to knot the game at 10. Ole Miss QB Griffing then scored on a one-yard touchdown scamper. The Razorbacks tacked on a field goal, but, as neither team could dent the scoreboard in the fourth quarter, lost by a 17–13 final.

Scoring summary

Quarter	Time	Drive			Team	Scoring information	Score	
Quarter	Time	Plays	Yards	TOP	Team	Scoring information	ARK	UM
2			80		UM	30-yard field goal by Irwin	0	3
2			82		ARK	30-yard field goal by Tom McKnelly	3	3
2			67		UM	Louis Guy 33-yard touchdown reception from Glynn Griffing, Irwin kick good	3	10
3			15		ARK	Jesse Branch 5-yard touchdown reception from Billy Moore, Tom McKnelly kick good	10	10
3			80		UM	Glynn Griffing 1-yard touchdown run, Irwin kick good	10	17
3			59		ARK	22-yard field goal by Tom McKnelly	13	17
"TOP" = time of possession. For other American football terms, see Glossary of American football.							13	17
