= 1962 Texas A&M Aggies football team =

American college football season

1962 Texas A&M Aggies football
- Conference: Southwest Conference
- Record: 3–7 (3–4 SWC)
- Head coach: Hank Foldberg (1st season)
- Home stadium: Kyle Field

1962 Southwest Conference football standings
	Conf.					Overall
Team	W		L		T	W		L		T
No. 4 Texas $	6	–	0	–	1	9	–	1	–	1
No. 6 Arkansas	6	–	1	–	0	9	–	2	–	0
TCU	5	–	2	–	0	6	–	4	–	0
Texas A&M	3	–	4	–	0	3	–	7	–	0
Baylor	3	–	4	–	0	4	–	6	–	0
Rice	2	–	4	–	1	2	–	6	–	2
SMU	2	–	5	–	0	2	–	8	–	0
Texas Tech	0	–	7	–	0	1	–	9	–	0
$ – Conference champion; Rankings from AP Poll

The 1962 Texas A&M Aggies football team represented Texas A&M University in the 1962 NCAA University Division football season as a member of the Southwest Conference (SWC). The Aggies were led by head coach Hank Foldberg in his first season and finished with a record of three wins and seven losses (3–7 overall, 3–4 in the SWC).

== Schedule ==
Date	Opponent	Site	Result	Attendance	Source
September 22	at No. 5 LSU*	Tiger Stadium; Baton Rouge, LA (rivalry)	L 0–21	68,000	
September 29	at Houston*	Rice Stadium; Houston, TX	L 3–6	51,000	
October 6	Texas Tech	Kyle Field; College Station, TX (rivalry)	W 7–3	20,000	
October 13	at Florida*	Florida Field; Gainesville, FL	L 6–42	33,000	
October 20	TCU	Kyle Field; College Station, TX (rivalry)	L 14–20	23,000	
October 27	at Baylor	Baylor Stadium; Waco, TX (rivalry)	W 6–3	35,000	
November 3	No. 8 Arkansas	Kyle Field; College Station, TX (rivalry)	L 7–17	23,000	
November 10	at SMU	Cotton Bowl; Dallas, TX	W 12–7	39,500	
November 17	at Rice	Rice Stadium; Houston, TX	L 3–23	42,000	
November 22	at No. 4 Texas	Memorial Stadium; Austin, TX (rivalry)	L 3–13	57,000	
*Non-conference game; Rankings from AP Poll released prior to the game
