= 1962 Texas Tech Red Raiders football team =

American college football season

1962 Texas Tech Red Raiders football
- Conference: Southwest Conference
- Record: 1–9 (0–7 SWC)
- Head coach: J. T. King (2nd season)
- Offensive scheme: T formation
- Base defense: 4–3
- Home stadium: Jones Stadium

1962 Southwest Conference football standings
	Conf.					Overall
Team	W		L		T	W		L		T
No. 4 Texas $	6	–	0	–	1	9	–	1	–	1
No. 6 Arkansas	6	–	1	–	0	9	–	2	–	0
TCU	5	–	2	–	0	6	–	4	–	0
Texas A&M	3	–	4	–	0	3	–	7	–	0
Baylor	3	–	4	–	0	4	–	6	–	0
Rice	2	–	4	–	1	2	–	6	–	2
SMU	2	–	5	–	0	2	–	8	–	0
Texas Tech	0	–	7	–	0	1	–	9	–	0
$ – Conference champion; Rankings from AP Poll

The 1962 Texas Tech Red Raiders football team represented Texas Technological College—now known as Texas Tech University—as a member of the Southwest Conference (SWC) during the 1962 NCAA University Division football season. In their second season under head coach J. T. King, the Red Raiders compiled a 1–9 record (0–7 against conference opponents), finished in last out of eight teams in the SWC, and were outscored by opponents by a combined total of 250 to 83. The team's statistical leaders included Doug Cannon with 274 passing yards, Roger Gill with 379 rushing yards, and David Parks with 399 receiving yards. The team played its home games at Clifford B. and Audrey Jones Stadium.

== Schedule ==
Date	Opponent	Site	Result	Attendance	Source
September 22	West Texas State*	Jones Stadium; Lubbock, TX	L 27–30	41,000	
September 29	No. 3 Texas	Jones Stadium; Lubbock, TX (rivalry)	L 0–34	42,000	
October 6	at Texas A&M	Kyle Field; College Station, TX (rivalry)	L 3–7	20,000	
October 13	at TCU	Amon G. Carter Stadium; Fort Worth, TX (rivalry)	L 13–35	22,000	
October 20	at Baylor	Baylor Stadium; Waco, TX (rivalry)	L 6–28	16,000	
October 27	SMU^{†}	Jones Stadium; Lubbock, TX	L 0–14	32,000	
November 3	at Rice	Rice Stadium; Houston, TX	L 0–14	22,000	
November 10	at Boston College*	Alumni Stadium; Chestnut Hill, MA	L 13–42	11,200	
November 17	Colorado*	Jones Stadium; Lubbock, TX	W 21–12	10,000–18,000	
November 24	No. 7 Arkansas	Jones Stadium; Lubbock, TX (rivalry)	L 0–34	16,000	
*Non-conference game; ^{†}Homecoming; Rankings from AP Poll released prior to the game
