= 1962 Baylor Bears football team =

American college football season

1962 Baylor Bears football
- Conference: Southwest Conference
- Record: 4–6 (3–4 SWC)
- Head coach: John Bridgers (4th season)
- Captain: Robert Burk
- Home stadium: Baylor Stadium

1962 Southwest Conference football standings
	Conf.					Overall
Team	W		L		T	W		L		T
No. 4 Texas $	6	–	0	–	1	9	–	1	–	1
No. 6 Arkansas	6	–	1	–	0	9	–	2	–	0
TCU	5	–	2	–	0	6	–	4	–	0
Texas A&M	3	–	4	–	0	3	–	7	–	0
Baylor	3	–	4	–	0	4	–	6	–	0
Rice	2	–	4	–	1	2	–	6	–	2
SMU	2	–	5	–	0	2	–	8	–	0
Texas Tech	0	–	7	–	0	1	–	9	–	0
$ – Conference champion; Rankings from AP Poll

The 1962 Baylor Bears football team represented Baylor University in the Southwest Conference (SWC) during the 1962 NCAA University Division football season. In their fourth season under head coach John Bridgers, the Bears compiled a 4–6 record (3–4 against conference opponents), tied for fourth place in the conference, and were outscored by opponents by a combined total of 169 to 159. They played their home games at Baylor Stadium in Waco, Texas.

The team's statistical leaders included Don Trull with 1,627 passing yards, Tom Davies with 230 rushing yards, Ronnie Goodwin with 414 receiving yards, and Trull, Goodwin, and Larry Elkins each with 24 points scored. Robert Black was the team captain.

== Schedule ==
Date	Opponent	Site	Result	Attendance	Source
September 22	at Houston*	Rice Stadium; Houston, TX	L 0–19	32,000	
September 29	Pittsburgh*	Baylor Stadium; Waco, TX	L 14–24	25,000	
October 13	at No. 8 Arkansas	Razorback Stadium; Fayetteville, AR	L 21–28	32,000	
October 20	Texas Tech	Baylor Stadium; Waco, TX (rivalry)	W 28–6	16,000	
October 27	Texas A&M^{†}	Baylor Stadium; Waco, TX (rivalry)	L 3–6	35,000	
November 3	at TCU	Amon G. Carter Stadium; Fort Worth, TX (rivalry)	L 26–28	20,000	
November 10	No. 5 Texas	Baylor Stadium; Waco, TX (rivalry)	L 12–27	30,000	
November 17	at Air Force*	Falcon Stadium; Colorado Springs, CO	W 10–3	18,000–18,600	
November 24	at SMU	Cotton Bowl; Dallas, TX	W 17–13	12,000	
December 1	Rice	Baylor Stadium; Waco, TX	W 28–15	16,000	
*Non-conference game; ^{†}Homecoming; Rankings from AP Poll released prior to the game

== After the season ==
The 1963 NFL draft was held on December 3, 1962. The following Bears were selected.

Round	Pick	Player	Position	NFL team
9	117	Don Trull	Quarterback	Baltimore Colts
12	159	Jimmy Maples	Center	Baltimore Colts
16	214	Ronnie Goodwin	Back	Philadelphia Eagles
