= 1962 TCU Horned Frogs football team =

American college football season

1962 TCU Horned Frogs football
- Conference: Southwest Conference
- Record: 6–4 (5–2 SWC)
- Head coach: Abe Martin (10th season)
- Offensive scheme: Meyer spread
- Home stadium: Amon G. Carter Stadium

1962 Southwest Conference football standings
	Conf.					Overall
Team	W		L		T	W		L		T
No. 4 Texas $	6	–	0	–	1	9	–	1	–	1
No. 6 Arkansas	6	–	1	–	0	9	–	2	–	0
TCU	5	–	2	–	0	6	–	4	–	0
Texas A&M	3	–	4	–	0	3	–	7	–	0
Baylor	3	–	4	–	0	4	–	6	–	0
Rice	2	–	4	–	1	2	–	6	–	2
SMU	2	–	5	–	0	2	–	8	–	0
Texas Tech	0	–	7	–	0	1	–	9	–	0
$ – Conference champion; Rankings from AP Poll

The 1962 TCU Horned Frogs football team represented Texas Christian University (TCU) in the 1962 NCAA University Division football season. The Horned Frogs finished the season 6–4 overall and 5–2 in the Southwest Conference. The team was coached by Abe Martin in his tenth year as head coach. The Frogs played their home games in Amon G. Carter Stadium, which is located on campus in Fort Worth, Texas.

== Schedule ==
Date	Opponent	Site	Result	Attendance	Source
September 22	at Kansas*	Memorial Stadium; Lawrence, KS	W 6–3	35,000	
September 29	at Miami (FL)*	Miami Orange Bowl; Miami, FL	L 20–21	51,251	
October 6	Arkansas	Amon G. Carter Stadium; Fort Worth, TX	L 14–42	42,536	
October 13	Texas Tech	Amon G. Carter Stadium; Fort Worth, TX (rivalry)	W 35–13	22,000	
October 20	at Texas A&M	Kyle Field; College Station, TX (rivalry)	W 20–14	23,000	
November 3	Baylor	Amon G. Carter Stadium; Fort Worth, TX (rivalry)	W 28–26	20,000	
November 10	at No. 9 LSU*	Tiger Stadium; Baton Rouge, LA	L 0–5	66,500	
November 17	No. 5 Texas	Amon G. Carter Stadium; Fort Worth, TX (rivalry)	L 0–14	42,393	
November 24	at Rice	Rice Stadium; Houston, TX	W 30–7	30,000	
December 1	at SMU	Cotton Bowl; Dallas, TX (rivalry)	W 14–9	15,400	
*Non-conference game; Rankings from AP Poll released prior to the game
