= List of Georgia Bulldogs starting quarterbacks =

This is a list of every Georgia Bulldogs football team quarterback and the years they participated on the Georgia Bulldogs football team.

== Main starting quarterbacks ==
=== 1892 to 1894 ===
The following players were the predominant quarters for the Bulldogs each season the team was a non-conference independent team, following the birth of Georgia football.

| Name | Years Started | Notability | References |
|---|---|---|---|
| W. N. Gramling | 1892 | Georgia's first quarterback. | |
| George Butler | 1893–1894 | Captain in 1894. | |

=== 1895 to 1921 ===
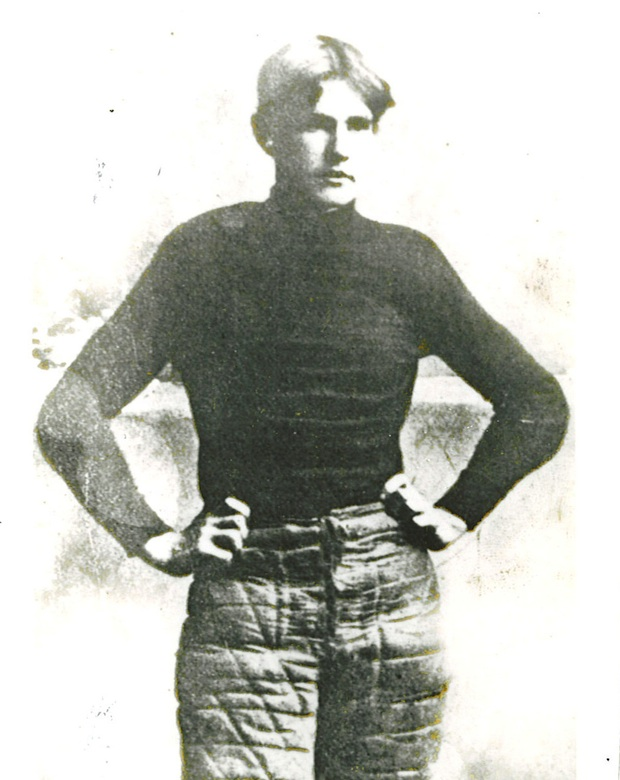
Richard Von Albade Gammon

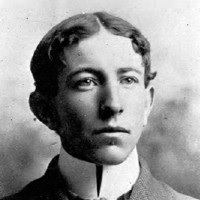
Reynolds Tichenor

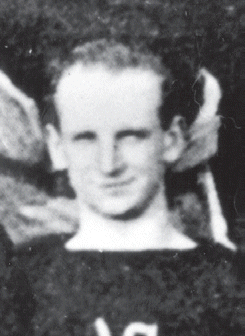
David Paddock

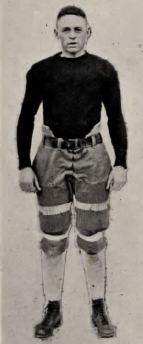
Sheldon Fitts

The following quarterbacks were the predominant quarters for the Bulldogs each season after the establishment of the Southern Intercollegiate Athletic Association until the establishment of the Southern Conference.

| Name | Years Started | Notability | References |
|---|---|---|---|
| Craig Barrow | 1895 | Later a distinguished physician in Savannah. | |
| Richard Von Albade Gammon | 1896 | Led Georgia to its first undefeated season under Pop Warner. He is most famous for having died after injuries sustained in a collegiate football game. The next year, he moved to fullback. He died in the game against Virginia. | |
| Reynolds Tichenor | 1897 | Transferred from Auburn. He was quarterback when Richard Von Albade Gammon met his death. | |
| James "Kid" Huff | 1898 | The small quarterback once prevented a Vanderbilt touchdown by tackling the massive Wallace Crutchfield. | |
| Young | 1899 | | |
| Frank K. McCutcheon | 1899–1900 | | |
| Cam Dorsey | 1900 | | |
| Johnny Monahan | 1901–1902 | | |
| Harry Woodruff | 1903–1904 | Brother of "Kid" and known as "Big Kid". The two of them were the namesake of Woodruff Hall. | |
| John Dozier Lowndes | 1905–1906 | | |
| E. Farriss | 1906 | | |
| Kid Woodruff | 1907–1908; 1910–1911 | He took a year off in 1909 to travel around the U.S. and Mexico. He coached the "dream and wonder team" of 1927. Brother of Harry; the two of them were the namesake of Woodruff Hall. | |
| John Northcutt | 1909 | | |
| Hafford Hay | 1909–1910 | | |
| Homer Thompson | 1910 | | |
| Leon Covington | 1912 | | |
| David Paddock | 1913–1915 | 3x All-Southern. Paddock went unnoticed his freshman year at halfback, until he was moved to the quarterback position in the game with Georgia Tech and led the Bulldogs to a 20 to 0 victory. Paddock is the only player in school history to have a petition circulated by the student body requesting that he play for the Bulldogs. He was its second ever All-American after Bob McWhorter. | |
| William Donnelly | 1916 | | |
| Buck Cheves | 1919–1920 | Head of the 1920 "ten second backfield" (Note: The term "ten second backfield" generally refers to players capable (or thought to be capable) of running a 100-yard dash in 10 seconds—that is, fast runners.) that went undefeated and was the first team of Georgia's to be called "Bulldogs." He returned a kick blocked by Puss Whelchel 87 yards for a touchdown to defeat Alabama, ranked fourth in The 50 Greatest Plays In Georgia Bulldogs Football History. | |
| Sheldon Fitts | 1920 | Started the Florida game. | |
| Teany Randall | 1921 | | |

=== 1922 to 1932 ===
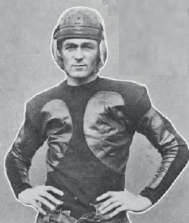
Dave Collings

The following quarterbacks were the predominant quarters for the Bulldogs each season after the establishment of the Southern Conference until the establishment of the Southeastern Conference.

| Name | Years Started | Notability | References |
|---|---|---|---|
| Dick Mulvehill | 1922 | | |
| Dave Collings | 1922 | Started the Vandy game. | |
| Scrappy Moore | 1923–1925 | Made the drop kick to beat Vandy. It was the game which injured Lynn Bomar. He coached the Chattanooga Mocs for many years, and is a member of the College Football Hall of Fame as a coach. | |
| Johnny Broadnax | 1926–1927 | Quarterback on the "dream and wonder team." In the 1940s he was assistant athletic director at UGA. | |
| H. F. Johnson | 1926–1928 | Quarterback on the "dream and wonder team." | |
| Moran | 1929 | | |
| Austin Downes | 1929–1931 | Transferred from Notre Dame. All-Southern. Led the 1930 team to wins over NYU and Yale. The 1931 team lost only to Southern Conference champion Tulane (whose only loss was in the Rose Bowl to USC) and National Champion USC. | |
| Leroy Young | 1932 | | |

=== 1933 to present ===
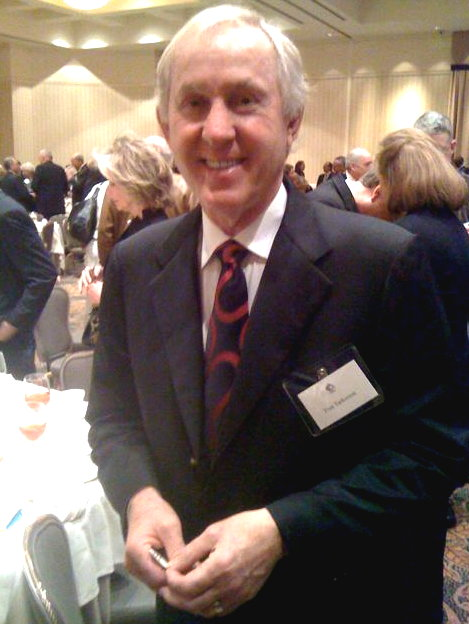
Fran Tarkenton

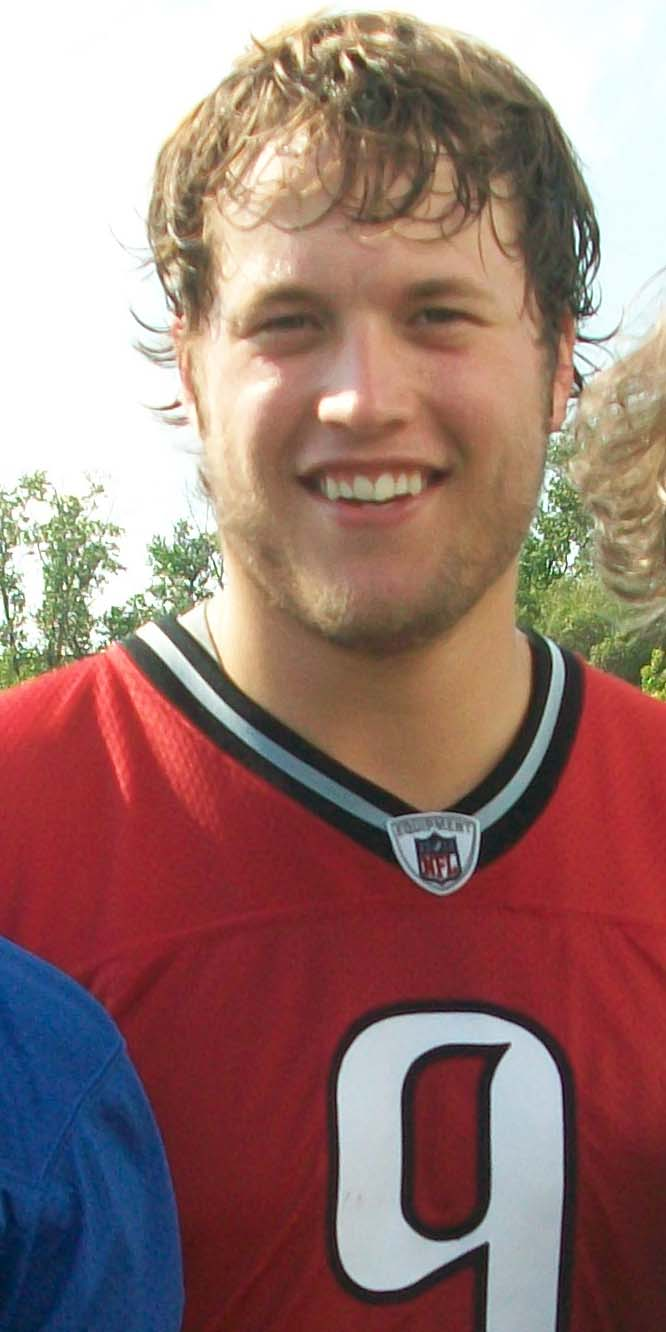
Matthew Stafford

The following quarterbacks were the leading passer for the Bulldogs each season since joining the Southeastern Conference in 1933.

| Name | Years Started | Notability | References |
|---|---|---|---|
| Byron Griffith | 1933–1934 | | |
| Charlie Treadaway | 1935 | | |
| Andy Roddenberry | 1936 | | |
| Lewis Young | 1936–1937 | | |
| Wallace Miller | 1937 | | |
| Bob Salisbury | 1938 | | |
| Robin Nowell | 1939 | | |
| Paul Kluk | 1940 | | |
| Cliff Kimsey | 1941 | | |
| Walter Maguire | 1942 | | |
| Bobby Hague | 1943 | | |
| Billy Hodges | 1944 | | |
| John Rauch | 1945–1948 | | |
| Ray Prosperi | 1949 | | |
| Zeke Bratkowski | 1950–1952 | | |
| Jimmy Harper | 1953–1955 | | |
| Billy Hearn | 1956 | | |
| Charley Britt | 1957–1959 | | |
| Fran Tarkenton | 1959–1960 | Led the Bulldogs to the 1959 SEC Championship. He was a famed scrambler. College Football Hall of Fame and Pro Football Hall of Fame. With the Minnesota Vikings, he had 3 Super Bowl appearances. Vikings Career Passing Yards Leader with 33,098. Vikings Career Passing Touchdowns Leader with 239. Vikings head coach Bud Grant flatly called Tarkenton "the greatest quarterback who's ever played." | |
| Larry Rakestraw | 1961–1963 | | |
| Lynn Hughes | 1964 | | |
| Kirby Moore | 1965–1967 | Led the Bulldogs to the 1966 SEC Championship. | |
| Mike Cavan | 1968–1970 | Led the Bulldogs to the 1968 SEC Championship. | |
| Andy Johnson | 1971–1973 | | |
| Matt Robinson | 1974 | With Ray Goff, led the Bulldogs to the 1976 SEC Championship. | |
| Ray Goff | 1975–1976 | With Matt Robinson, led the Bulldogs to the 1976 SEC Championship. | |
| Jeff Pyburn | 1977–1979 | | |
| Buck Belue | 1979–1981 | Led the Bulldogs to become the 1980 National Champions. Led the Bulldogs to become the 1980 and 1981 SEC Champions. | |
| John Lastinger | 1982–1983 | Led the Bulldogs to the 1982 SEC Championship. | |
| Todd Williams | 1983–1984 | | |
| Wayne Johnson | 1985–1988 | | |
| James Jackson | 1985–1987 | | |
| Greg Talley | 1989–1991 | | |
| Preston Jones | 1990 | | |
| Joe Dupree | 1990 | | |
| Eric Zeier | 1991–1994 | | |
| Mike Bobo | 1995–1997 | | |
| Hines Ward | 1995 | | |
| Brian Smith | 1995 | | |
| Quincy Carter | 1998–2000 | | |
| Cory Phillips | 2000 | | |
| David Greene | 2001–2004 | Led the Bulldogs to a 2002 SEC Championship title. | |
| D. J. Shockley | 2004–2005 | Led the Bulldogs to a 2005 SEC Championship title. | |
| Joe Tereshinski | 2005–2006 | | |
| Matthew Stafford | 2006–2008 | Current starting quarterback for the Los Angeles Rams. 1st Overall Pick of the 2009 NFL draft. AP NFL Comeback Player of the Year (2011). First UGA QB to win a Super Bowl, with the Los Angeles Rams in the 2022 victory over the Cincinnati Bengals. | |
| Joe Cox | 2006, 2009 | | |
| Aaron Murray | 2010–2013 | SEC Career Passing Yards Leader. | |
| Hutson Mason | 2013–2014 | | |
| Greyson Lambert | 2015–2016 | | |
| Faton Bauta | 2015 | Started against Florida, throwing four interceptions in his lone start, losing 27–3. | |
| Jacob Eason | 2016–2017 | | |
| Jake Fromm | 2017–2019 | Led the Bulldogs to become the 2017 SEC Champions, but was defeated in the 2018 National Championship title game | |
| D'Wan Mathis | 2020 | Started the first game of the 2020 season. Was benched and eventually transferred to Temple. | |
| Stetson Bennett | 2020–2022 | Led the Bulldogs to become the 2021–22 and 2022–23 National Champions. Led the Bulldogs to become the 2021 and 2022 SEC Champions. | |
| JT Daniels | 2020–2021 | | |
| Carson Beck | 2023–2024 | Led the Bulldogs to a 2024 SEC Championship title. | |
| Gunner Stockton | 2024–2026 | Made first career start in the 2025 Sugar Bowl | |
