= Buck Cheves =

American football player and referee (1898–1995)

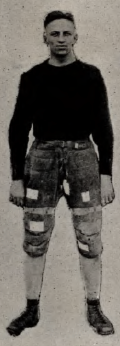
- Cheves, c. 1920

No. 19
- Position: Quarterback

Personal information
- Born: November 28, 1898; Richwood, Georgia, U.S.
- Died: April 12, 1995 (aged 96); Cobb County, Georgia, U.S.
- Listed weight: 145 lb (66 kg)

Career information
- High school: Georgia Military College
- College: Georgia (1919–1920)

Awards and highlights
- SIAA championship (1920); All-Southern (1920); Georgia Sports Hall of Fame

James Parks "Buck" Cheves (Note: His surname appears as "Cheeves" in some publications, including contemporary Pandora yearbooks, and the present-day Georgia Bulldogs media guide.) (November 28, 1898 – April 12, 1995) was an American college football player and referee. Cheves played for the Georgia Bulldogs and later was a Southeastern Conference official for 35 years.

== Biography ==
Cheves was born in Richwood, Georgia, in 1898, and his family moved to Atlanta before 1900. He prepped at Georgia Military College in Milledgeville.

Cheves starred in the backfield of the 1919 Georgia football team, He then led the "ten second backfield" (Note: The term "ten second backfield" generally refers to players capable (or thought to be capable) of running a 100-yard dash in 10 seconds—that is, fast runners.) of the 1920 Georgia football team under first-year coach Herman Stegeman. The team compiled an 8–0–1 record and won a Southern Intercollegiate Athletic Association (SIAA) title. It was the first Georgia squad to be known as the "Bulldogs."

Cheves played without a helmet, because he claimed the headgear impaired his hearing. He returned a kick blocked by Puss Whelchel for 87 yards, scoring a touchdown to defeat Alabama during the 1920 season. The play was ranked fourth in the 2008 book The 50 Greatest Plays In Georgia Bulldogs Football History, and still stands as one of the longest return touchdowns in Bulldogs history.

Cheves was also a guard on the Georgia basketball team. He was captain of the 1921 basketball team that lost to Basil Hayden and the Kentucky Wildcats' "Wonder Team" in the SIAA championship game. He was a member of the Sigma Chi fraternity.

A ballad dedicated to Cheves appeared in the student newspaper, Red and Black:

O! Cheves! O! Cheves!

In south, thou art rough,

The enemy grieves

When thou show'st thy stuff,

Thou art like a hurricane,

Thou hittest them hard,

God pity the man

Whom thou dost guard.

In 1924, sportswriter Morgan Blake listed Cheves as the quarterback in his selection of the greatest football players from Atlanta.

In 1945, Cheves was president of the Touchdown Club of Atlanta. He was inducted into the Georgia Sports Hall of Fame in 1976.

Outside of his sporting career, Cheves was involved in real estate from 1922 though his retirement in the 1980s. He died in 1995, aged 96.
