= 1962 SMU Mustangs football team =

American college football season

1962 SMU Mustangs football
- Conference: Southwest Conference
- Record: 2–8 (2–5 SWC)
- Head coach: Hayden Fry (1st season)
- Captains: Tommy Brennan; Les Stewart; Jack Rhoads
- Home stadium: Cotton Bowl

1962 Southwest Conference football standings
	Conf.					Overall
Team	W		L		T	W		L		T
No. 4 Texas $	6	–	0	–	1	9	–	1	–	1
No. 6 Arkansas	6	–	1	–	0	9	–	2	–	0
TCU	5	–	2	–	0	6	–	4	–	0
Texas A&M	3	–	4	–	0	3	–	7	–	0
Baylor	3	–	4	–	0	4	–	6	–	0
Rice	2	–	4	–	1	2	–	6	–	2
SMU	2	–	5	–	0	2	–	8	–	0
Texas Tech	0	–	7	–	0	1	–	9	–	0
$ – Conference champion; Rankings from AP Poll

The 1962 SMU Mustangs football team represented Southern Methodist University (SMU) as a member of the Southwest Conference (SWC) during the 1962 NCAA University Division football season. Led by first-year head coach Hayden Fry, the Mustangs compiled an overall record of 2–8 with a conference mark of 2–5, placing seventh in the SWC.

== Schedule ==
Date	Opponent	Site	Result	Attendance	Source
September 22	at Maryland*	Byrd Stadium; College Park, MD	L 0–7	33,000	
September 29	No. 9 USC*	Cotton Bowl; Dallas, TX	L 3–33	14,000	
October 6	Air Force*	Cotton Bowl; Dallas, TX	L 20–25	28,000–31,000	
October 20	Rice	Cotton Bowl; Dallas, TX (rivalry)	W 15–7	15,000	
October 27	at Texas Tech	Jones Stadium; Lubbock, TX	W 14–0	32,000	
November 3	at No. 5 Texas	Memorial Stadium; Austin, TX	L 0–6	41,000	
November 10	Texas A&M	Cotton Bowl; Dallas, TX	L 7–12	39,500	
November 17	at No. 7 Arkansas	War Memorial Stadium; Little Rock, AR	L 7–9	41,000	
November 24	Baylor	Cotton Bowl; Dallas, TX	L 13–17	12,000	
December 1	TCU	Cotton Bowl; Dallas, TX (rivalry)	L 9–14	15,400	
*Non-conference game; Rankings from AP Poll released prior to the game
