= 2015 Cotton Bowl Classic =

2015 Cotton Bowl Classic can refer to:

- 2015 Cotton Bowl Classic (January), played as part of the 2014–15 college football bowl season between the Baylor Bears and the Michigan State Spartans
- 2015 Cotton Bowl Classic (December), played as part of the 2015–16 college football bowl season serving as a College Football Playoff semifinal between the Alabama Crimson Tide and the Michigan State Spartans
