= 1962 Rice Owls football team =

American college football season

1962 Rice Owls football
- Conference: Southwest Conference
- Record: 2–6–2 (2–4–1 SWC)
- Head coach: Jess Neely (23rd season)
- Home stadium: Rice Stadium

1962 Southwest Conference football standings
| | Conf. | | | | | Overall |
| Team | W | | L | | T | W | | L | | T |
|---|---|---|---|---|---|---|---|---|---|---|
| No. 4 Texas $ | 6 | – | 0 | – | 1 | 9 | – | 1 | – | 1 |
| No. 6 Arkansas | 6 | – | 1 | – | 0 | 9 | – | 2 | – | 0 |
| TCU | 5 | – | 2 | – | 0 | 6 | – | 4 | – | 0 |
| Texas A&M | 3 | – | 4 | – | 0 | 3 | – | 7 | – | 0 |
| Baylor | 3 | – | 4 | – | 0 | 4 | – | 6 | – | 0 |
| Rice | 2 | – | 4 | – | 1 | 2 | – | 6 | – | 2 |
| SMU | 2 | – | 5 | – | 0 | 2 | – | 8 | – | 0 |
| Texas Tech | 0 | – | 7 | – | 0 | 1 | – | 9 | – | 0 |
$ – Conference champion; Rankings from AP Poll

The 1962 Rice Owls football team represented Rice University during the 1962 NCAA University Division football season. In its 23rd season under head coach Jess Neely, the team compiled a 2–6–2 record and was outscored by a total of 173 to 119. The team played its home games at Rice Stadium in Houston, Texas, where just before the season John F. Kennedy delivered his "We choose to go to the Moon" speech.

The team's statistical leaders included Randall Kerbow with 703 passing yards, Paul Piper with 387 rushing yards and 24 points scored, and Gene Raesz with 373 receiving yards. Raesz was selected by both the Associated Press and United Press International as a first-team player on the 1962 All-Southwest Conference football team.

== Schedule ==
| Date | Opponent | Site | Result | Attendance | Source |
|---|---|---|---|---|---|
| September 29 | at No. 5 LSU* | Tiger Stadium; Baton Rouge, LA | T 6–6 | 67,500 | |
| October 6 | No. 4 Penn State* | Rice Stadium; Houston, TX | L 7–18 | 35,982–38,000 | |
| October 13 | Oregon* | Rice Stadium; Houston, TX | L 12–31 | 30,000 | |
| October 20 | at SMU | Cotton Bowl; Dallas, TX (rivalry) | L 7–15 | 15,000 | |
| October 27 | No. 1 Texas | Rice Stadium; Houston, TX (rivalry) | T 14–14 | 73,000 | |
| November 3 | Texas Tech | Rice Stadium; Houston, TX | W 14–0 | 22,000 | |
| November 10 | at No. 6 Arkansas | Razorback Stadium; Fayetteville, AR | L 14–28 | 34,000 | |
| November 17 | Texas A&M | Rice Stadium; Houston, TX | W 23–3 | 42,000 | |
| November 24 | TCU | Rice Stadium; Houston, TX | L 7–30 | 30,000 | |
| December 1 | at Baylor | Baylor Stadium; Waco, TX | L 15–28 | 16,000 | |
*Non-conference game; Rankings from AP Poll released prior to the game
