= Richwood, Georgia =

Unincorporated community in Georgia, U.S.

Coordinates: 32°02′31″N 83°47′11″W

Richwood is an unincorporated community in Dooly County, in the U.S. state of Georgia.

== History ==
Richwood had its start as a lumber town, and most likely was named for the thick woods which once covered the site. A post office called Richwood was established in 1887, and remained in operation until 1947.
