= 1962 Texas Longhorns football team =

American college football season

1962 Texas Longhorns football

SWC champion

Cotton Bowl Classic, L 0–13 vs. LSU
- Conference: Southwest Conference

Ranking
- Coaches: No. 4
- AP: No. 4
- Record: 9–1–1 (6–0–1 SWC)
- Head coach: Darrell Royal (6th season)
- Home stadium: Memorial Stadium

1962 Southwest Conference football standings
	Conf.					Overall
Team	W		L		T	W		L		T
No. 4 Texas $	6	–	0	–	1	9	–	1	–	1
No. 6 Arkansas	6	–	1	–	0	9	–	2	–	0
TCU	5	–	2	–	0	6	–	4	–	0
Texas A&M	3	–	4	–	0	3	–	7	–	0
Baylor	3	–	4	–	0	4	–	6	–	0
Rice	2	–	4	–	1	2	–	6	–	2
SMU	2	–	5	–	0	2	–	8	–	0
Texas Tech	0	–	7	–	0	1	–	9	–	0
$ – Conference champion; Rankings from AP Poll

The 1962 Texas Longhorns football team was an American football team that represented the University of Texas (now known as the University of Texas at Austin) as a member of the Southwest Conference (SWC) during the 1962 NCAA University Division football season. In their sixth year under head coach Darrell Royal, the Longhorns compiled an overall record of 9–1–1, with a mark of 6–0–1 in conference play, and finished as SWC champion. Texas concluded their season with a loss against LSU in the Cotton Bowl Classic.

Johnny Treadwell played at both offensive guard and linebacker and was a consensus pick on the 1962 All-America team,

== Schedule ==
Date	Time	Opponent	Rank	Site	TV	Result	Attendance	Source
September 22	7:30 p.m.	Oregon*	No. 2	Memorial Stadium; Austin, TX		W 25–13	50,000	
September 29	7:30 p.m.	at Texas Tech	No. 3	Jones Stadium; Lubbock, TX (rivalry)		W 34–0	42,000	
October 6	7:30 p.m.	Tulane*	No. 3	Memorial Stadium; Austin, TX		W 35–8	50,000	
October 13	2:00 p.m.	vs. Oklahoma*	No. 2	Cotton Bowl; Dallas, TX (rivalry)	CBS	W 9–6	75,504	
October 20	7:30 p.m.	No. 7 Arkansas	No. 1	Memorial Stadium; Austin, TX (rivalry)		W 7–3	64,530	
October 27	8:00 p.m.	at Rice	No. 1	Rice Stadium; Houston, TX (rivalry)		T 14–14	73,000	
November 3	2:00 p.m.	SMU	No. 5	Memorial Stadium; Austin, TX		W 6–0	51,000	
November 10	2:00 p.m.	at Baylor	No. 5	Baylor Stadium; Waco, TX (rivalry)		W 27–12	30,000	
November 17	2:00 p.m.	at TCU	No. 5	Amon G. Carter Stadium; Fort Worth, TX (rivalry)		W 14–0	42,393	
November 22	2:00 p.m.	Texas A&M	No. 4	Memorial Stadium; Austin, TX (rivalry)	CBS	W 13–3	57,000	
January 1, 1963	1:30 p.m.	vs. No. 7 LSU*	No. 4	Cotton Bowl; Dallas, TX (Cotton Bowl Classic)	CBS	L 0–13	75,500	
*Non-conference game; Rankings from AP Poll released prior to the game; All times are in Central time

== Awards and honors ==
- Johnny Treadwell, guard: Cotton Bowl co-Most Valuable Player consensus All-American
