= Lynn Amedee =

American football player and coach (1941–2025)

Biographical details
- Born: August 3, 1941; Baton Rouge, Louisiana, U.S.
- Died: May 20, 2025 (aged 83)
- Education: Baton Rouge (LA) Istrouma

Playing career
- 1960–1962: LSU
- 1963–1964: Edmonton Eskimos
- Position: Quarterback

Coaching career (HC unless noted)
- 1972: Tulane (assistant)
- 1973: New Orleans Saints (assistant)
- 1973: Birmingham Americans (assistant)
- 1975–1978: LSU (QB)
- 1979: Tennessee (QB)
- 1980–1981: Tennessee–Martin
- 1982: Southwestern Louisiana (OC)
- 1983–1984: Vanderbilt (OC)
- 1985–1987: Texas A&M (OC)
- 1988: Florida (OC)
- 1989–1991: Texas (OC)
- 1992–1993: Northeast HS (LA)
- 1993–1994: LSU (OC)
- 1995: New Iberia HS (LA)
- 1996–1998: Mississippi State (OC/QB)
- 1999–2003: Opelousas HS (LA)

Head coaching record
- Overall: 8–14 (college)

Lynn Amedee (August 3, 1941 – May 20, 2025) was an American football player and coach. He played professionally as a quarterback for the Edmonton Eskimos of the Canadian Football League (CFL). He served as the head coach for two seasons at the University of Tennessee at Martin, an assistant coach at nine different colleges and two different professional teams, and a head coach at three high schools.

== Playing career ==
Amedee played quarterback and placekicker under coaches Paul Dietzel and Charles McClendon at Louisiana State from 1960 to 1962. He was named the outstanding player of the 1963 Cotton Bowl, kicking two field goals and recovering a fumble in LSU's 13–0 victory over Texas. Amedee also pitched for LSU's baseball team.

He was not selected in the 1963 NFL draft but started a professional career with the CFL's Edmonton Eskimos. Over the course of the two seasons, Amedee played in 16 games for the Eskimos, throwing for 1,788 yards on 279 attempts with eight touchdowns.

== Coaching career ==
Amedee began his football coaching career as an assistant at Northeast Louisiana in 1970, before moving on to be an assistant at Tulane and then as an assistant for the NFL's New Orleans Saints and WFL's Birmingham Americans, before returning to his alma mater as quarterbacks coach under head coach McClendon from 1975 to 1978.

In 1980, he became head coach at the University of Tennessee at Martin. He guided the school to an 8–14 record in two years before resigning in order to join the coaching staff at Southwestern Louisiana (now Louisiana-Lafayette). He left USL after one season, heading to Vanderbilt to become offensive coordinator under head coach George MacIntyre. Amedee left Vanderbilt after the 1984 season, as he was hired as offensive coordinator by new Texas A&M head coach Jackie Sherrill. In 1986, Amedee interviewed for the vacant LSU head coaching job, but lost out to LSU defensive coordinator Mike Archer.

In 1988, he became offensive coordinator under head coach Galen Hall at the University of Florida, where he drew criticism for his strategy to use sophomore running back Emmitt Smith as a "decoy". 1988 was Smith's only season with less than 1,000 yards rushing.

In 1989, Amedee was hired as offensive coordinator by Texas head coach David McWilliams. After McWilliams resignation in 1991, Amedee sat out for a year, before joining Curley Hallman's coaching staff at his alma mater LSU. Hallman, along with the coaching staff, was fired after the 1994 season. Amedee went on to coach one season at New Iberia (Louisiana) Senior High and left the school that December to accept the offensive coordinator position under Sherrill at Mississippi State. In 1999, Amedee left the collegiate ranks, taking over head coaching duties at Opelousas High School in Opelousas, Louisiana, he retired after the 2003 season.

== Death ==
Amedee died on May 20, 2025, at the age of 83.

== Head coaching record ==
=== College ===
Year	Team	Overall	Conference	Standing	Bowl/playoffs
Tennessee–Martin Pacers (Gulf South Conference) (1980–1981)
1980	Tennessee–Martin	4–7	2–4	T–4th	
1981	Tennessee–Martin	4–7	3–3	T–4th	
Tennessee–Martin:		8–14	5–7		
Total:		8–14			
