= Jimmy Field =

American lawyer (born 1940)

James Morgan "Jimmy" Field
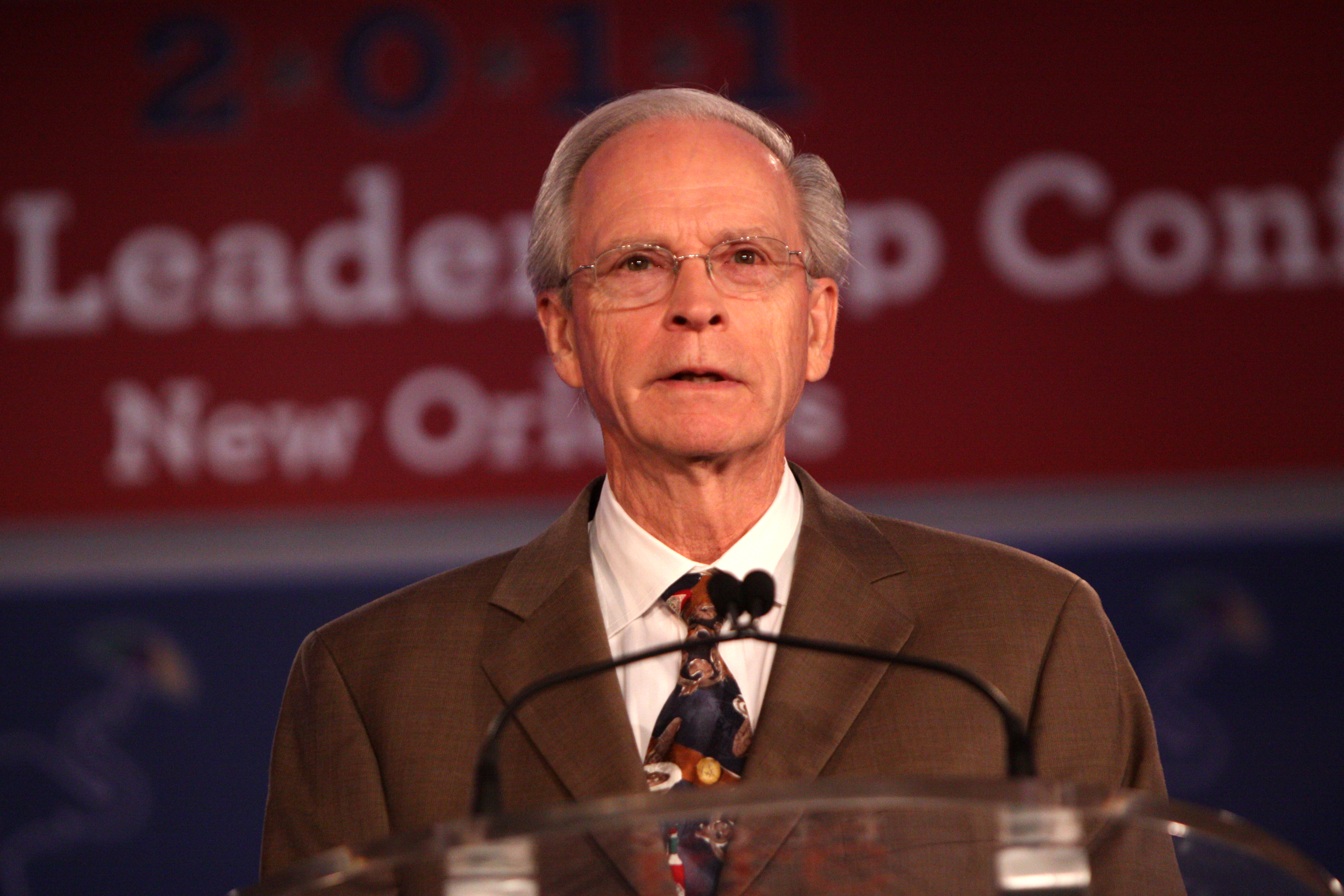

Member of the Louisiana Public Service Commission from the 2nd district
- In office December 2, 1996 – December 31, 2012
- Preceded by: Kathleen Babineaux Blanco
- Succeeded by: Scott Angelle

Personal details
- Born: April 16, 1940 (age 86) New Jersey, U.S.
- Party: Republican
- Spouse: Laura Field (married since c. 1961)
- Children: Jim Field, Mark Field, Shannon Mckernan, and Brittany Leak
- Education: Louisiana State University
- Occupation: Attorney

James Morgan Field, known as Jimmy Field (born April 16, 1940), is a part-time attorney in Baton Rouge, Louisiana, and a Republican former member of the Louisiana Public Service Commission. The five-member public regulatory agency oversees utilities, trucking, and telecommunications companies. Field was elected to the PSC in 1996 to succeed the Democrat Kathleen Babineaux Blanco of Lafayette, who became lieutenant governor and subsequently governor from 2004 to 2008.

== Background ==
A native of New Jersey, Field moved to Baton Rouge as a young child and graduated thereafter from University High School. In 1963, he received a Bachelor of Science degree from Louisiana State University. In 1966, he procured his legal credentials from the Louisiana State University Law Center. In the early 1960s, he was a quarterback and outfielder for LSU Tigers football and baseball teams. Field was admitted to the bar in 1966 and specialized in real estate, public utility, commercial, and labor/employment law. He served as a National Football League player representative from 1983 to 2007.

== PSC service ==
Field was elected to the four years remaining in Blanco's term in 1996 and elected to two six-year terms of his own in 2000 and 2006. His District 2 represents nearly one million inhabitants in portions of East Baton Rouge, Iberville, Livingston St. Martin, and West Baton Rouge parishes as well as all of East Feliciana, Iberia, Lafayette, Lafourche, St. Mary, Terrebonne, and West Feliciana parishes. One of his assistants was Donald Trahan, a member of the Louisiana House of Representatives from 2004 to 2008 for Lafayette and Vermilion parishes.

Field won the 1996 special election to replace Blanco on the PSC with 52 percent of 344,919 votes cast. He won his first full term in 2000 with 68 percent of the 139,149 votes cast.

Field did not seek reelection in 2012 because of stated family obligations. As a commissioner, Field worked to procure $2 billion in refunds and rate reductions to consumers: "I am especially proud that Louisiana's residential electric rates are currently among the lowest in the nation." PSC chairman Foster Campbell, a Democrat from Bossier City, said that Field "always had the consumers in mind. But he wanted to be fair to the big companies."

Five candidates, including three Republicans, sought the seat that Field vacated. The runaway winner in the race was former lieutenant governor Scott Angelle of Breaux Bridge, who finished with 213,485 votes (57.2 percent) and carried all thirteen parishes in District 2. The Democrat Forest Wright finished second in the balloting with 76,336 votes (20.5 percent), and Republican State Representative Erich Ponti of Baton Rouge, trailed in third place with 43,287 ballots (11.6 percent). Two other contenders, a Republican and a No Party contender, shared the remaining 11 percent of the vote.

Preceded by Kathleen Babineaux Blanco	Louisiana Public Service Commissioner; 1996–2012	Succeeded by Scott Angelle
