= List of Atlantic Coast Conference football standings =

The Atlantic Coast Conference first sponsored football in 1953. This is a list of its annual standings since establishment.

== Standings ==
1953 Atlantic Coast Conference football standings
| | Conf. | | | | | Overall |
| Team | W | | L | | T | W | | L | | T |
|---|---|---|---|---|---|---|---|---|---|---|
| No. 1 Maryland + | 3 | – | 0 | – | 0 | 10 | – | 1 | – | 0 |
| No. 18 Duke + | 4 | – | 0 | – | 0 | 7 | – | 2 | – | 1 |
| South Carolina | 2 | – | 3 | – | 0 | 7 | – | 3 | – | 0 |
| North Carolina | 2 | – | 3 | – | 0 | 4 | – | 6 | – | 0 |
| Wake Forest | 2 | – | 3 | – | 0 | 3 | – | 6 | – | 1 |
| Clemson | 1 | – | 2 | – | 0 | 3 | – | 5 | – | 1 |
| NC State | 0 | – | 3 | – | 0 | 1 | – | 9 | – | 0 |
+ – Conference co-champions; Rankings from AP poll

1954 Atlantic Coast Conference football standings
| | Conf. | | | | | Overall |
| Team | W | | L | | T | W | | L | | T |
|---|---|---|---|---|---|---|---|---|---|---|
| No. 14 Duke $ | 4 | – | 0 | – | 0 | 8 | – | 2 | – | 1 |
| No. 8 Maryland | 4 | – | 0 | – | 1 | 7 | – | 2 | – | 1 |
| North Carolina | 4 | – | 2 | – | 0 | 4 | – | 5 | – | 1 |
| South Carolina | 3 | – | 3 | – | 0 | 6 | – | 4 | – | 0 |
| Clemson | 1 | – | 2 | – | 0 | 5 | – | 5 | – | 0 |
| Wake Forest | 1 | – | 4 | – | 1 | 2 | – | 7 | – | 1 |
| Virginia | 0 | – | 2 | – | 0 | 3 | – | 6 | – | 0 |
| NC State | 0 | – | 4 | – | 0 | 2 | – | 8 | – | 0 |
$ – Conference champion; Rankings from AP poll

1955 Atlantic Coast Conference football standings
| | Conf. | | | | | Overall |
| Team | W | | L | | T | W | | L | | T |
|---|---|---|---|---|---|---|---|---|---|---|
| No. 3 Maryland + | 4 | – | 0 | – | 0 | 10 | – | 1 | – | 0 |
| Duke + | 4 | – | 0 | – | 0 | 7 | – | 2 | – | 1 |
| Clemson | 3 | – | 1 | – | 0 | 7 | – | 3 | – | 0 |
| Wake Forest | 3 | – | 3 | – | 1 | 5 | – | 4 | – | 1 |
| North Carolina | 3 | – | 3 | – | 0 | 3 | – | 7 | – | 0 |
| NC State | 0 | – | 2 | – | 1 | 4 | – | 5 | – | 1 |
| South Carolina | 1 | – | 5 | – | 0 | 3 | – | 6 | – | 0 |
| Virginia | 0 | – | 4 | – | 0 | 1 | – | 9 | – | 0 |
+ – Conference co-champions; Rankings from AP poll

1956 Atlantic Coast Conference football standings
| | Conf. | | | | | Overall |
| Team | W | | L | | T | W | | L | | T |
|---|---|---|---|---|---|---|---|---|---|---|
| No. 19 Clemson $ | 4 | – | 0 | – | 1 | 7 | – | 2 | – | 2 |
| Duke | 4 | – | 1 | – | 0 | 5 | – | 4 | – | 1 |
| South Carolina | 5 | – | 2 | – | 0 | 7 | – | 3 | – | 0 |
| Maryland | 2 | – | 2 | – | 1 | 2 | – | 7 | – | 1 |
| North Carolina | 2 | – | 3 | – | 1 | 2 | – | 7 | – | 1 |
| NC State | 2 | – | 4 | – | 0 | 3 | – | 7 | – | 0 |
| Wake Forest | 1 | – | 5 | – | 1 | 2 | – | 5 | – | 3 |
| Virginia | 1 | – | 4 | – | 0 | 3 | – | 7 | – | 0 |
Rankings from AP poll

1957 Atlantic Coast Conference football standings
| | Conf. | | | | | Overall |
| Team | W | | L | | T | W | | L | | T |
|---|---|---|---|---|---|---|---|---|---|---|
| No. 15 NC State $ | 5 | – | 0 | – | 1 | 7 | – | 1 | – | 2 |
| No. 16 Duke | 5 | – | 1 | – | 1 | 6 | – | 3 | – | 2 |
| Clemson | 4 | – | 3 | – | 0 | 7 | – | 3 | – | 0 |
| North Carolina | 4 | – | 3 | – | 0 | 7 | – | 3 | – | 0 |
| Maryland | 4 | – | 3 | – | 0 | 5 | – | 5 | – | 0 |
| Virginia | 2 | – | 4 | – | 0 | 3 | – | 6 | – | 1 |
| South Carolina | 2 | – | 5 | – | 0 | 5 | – | 5 | – | 0 |
| Wake Forest | 0 | – | 7 | – | 0 | 0 | – | 10 | – | 0 |
$ – Conference champion; Rankings from AP poll

1958 Atlantic Coast Conference football standings
| | Conf. | | | | | Overall |
| Team | W | | L | | T | W | | L | | T |
|---|---|---|---|---|---|---|---|---|---|---|
| No. 12 Clemson $ | 5 | – | 1 | – | 0 | 8 | – | 3 | – | 0 |
| No. 15 South Carolina | 5 | – | 2 | – | 0 | 7 | – | 3 | – | 0 |
| Duke | 3 | – | 2 | – | 0 | 5 | – | 5 | – | 0 |
| North Carolina | 4 | – | 3 | – | 0 | 6 | – | 4 | – | 0 |
| Maryland | 3 | – | 3 | – | 0 | 4 | – | 6 | – | 0 |
| Wake Forest | 2 | – | 4 | – | 0 | 3 | – | 7 | – | 0 |
| NC State | 2 | – | 5 | – | 0 | 2 | – | 7 | – | 1 |
| Virginia | 1 | – | 5 | – | 0 | 1 | – | 9 | – | 0 |
$ – Conference champion; Rankings from AP poll

1959 Atlantic Coast Conference football standings
| | Conf. | | | | | Overall |
| Team | W | | L | | T | W | | L | | T |
|---|---|---|---|---|---|---|---|---|---|---|
| No. 11 Clemson $ | 6 | – | 1 | – | 0 | 9 | – | 2 | – | 0 |
| North Carolina | 5 | – | 2 | – | 0 | 5 | – | 5 | – | 0 |
| Maryland | 4 | – | 2 | – | 0 | 5 | – | 5 | – | 0 |
| South Carolina | 4 | – | 3 | – | 0 | 6 | – | 4 | – | 0 |
| Wake Forest | 4 | – | 3 | – | 0 | 6 | – | 4 | – | 0 |
| Duke | 2 | – | 3 | – | 0 | 4 | – | 6 | – | 0 |
| NC State | 0 | – | 6 | – | 0 | 1 | – | 9 | – | 0 |
| Virginia | 0 | – | 5 | – | 0 | 0 | – | 10 | – | 0 |
$ – Conference champion; Rankings from AP poll

1960 Atlantic Coast Conference football standings
| | Conf. | | | | | Overall |
| Team | W | | L | | T | W | | L | | T |
|---|---|---|---|---|---|---|---|---|---|---|
| No. 10 Duke $ | 5 | – | 1 | – | 0 | 8 | – | 3 | – | 0 |
| NC State | 4 | – | 1 | – | 1 | 6 | – | 3 | – | 1 |
| Maryland | 5 | – | 2 | – | 0 | 6 | – | 4 | – | 0 |
| Clemson | 4 | – | 2 | – | 0 | 6 | – | 4 | – | 0 |
| South Carolina | 3 | – | 3 | – | 1 | 3 | – | 6 | – | 1 |
| North Carolina | 2 | – | 5 | – | 0 | 3 | – | 7 | – | 0 |
| Wake Forest | 2 | – | 5 | – | 0 | 2 | – | 8 | – | 0 |
| Virginia | 0 | – | 6 | – | 0 | 0 | – | 10 | – | 0 |
$ – Conference champion; Rankings from AP poll

1961 Atlantic Coast Conference football standings
| | Conf. | | | Overall |
| Team | W | | L | W | | L |
|---|---|---|---|---|---|---|
| No. 20 Duke $ | 5 | – | 1 | 7 | – | 3 |
| North Carolina | 4 | – | 3 | 5 | – | 5 |
| Maryland | 3 | – | 3 | 7 | – | 3 |
| Clemson | 3 | – | 3 | 5 | – | 5 |
| NC State | 3 | – | 4 | 4 | – | 6 |
| South Carolina | 3 | – | 4 | 4 | – | 6 |
| Wake Forest | 3 | – | 4 | 4 | – | 6 |
| Virginia | 2 | – | 4 | 4 | – | 6 |
$ – Conference champion; Rankings from AP poll

1962 Atlantic Coast Conference football standings
| | Conf. | | | | | Overall |
| Team | W | | L | | T | W | | L | | T |
|---|---|---|---|---|---|---|---|---|---|---|
| Duke $ | 6 | – | 0 | – | 0 | 8 | – | 2 | – | 0 |
| Clemson | 5 | – | 1 | – | 0 | 6 | – | 4 | – | 0 |
| Maryland | 5 | – | 2 | – | 0 | 6 | – | 4 | – | 0 |
| South Carolina | 3 | – | 4 | – | 0 | 4 | – | 5 | – | 1 |
| NC State | 3 | – | 4 | – | 0 | 3 | – | 6 | – | 1 |
| North Carolina | 3 | – | 4 | – | 0 | 3 | – | 7 | – | 0 |
| Virginia | 1 | – | 4 | – | 0 | 5 | – | 5 | – | 0 |
| Wake Forest | 0 | – | 7 | – | 0 | 0 | – | 10 | – | 0 |
$ – Conference champion

1963 Atlantic Coast Conference football standings
| | Conf. | | | | | Overall |
| Team | W | | L | | T | W | | L | | T |
|---|---|---|---|---|---|---|---|---|---|---|
| North Carolina + | 6 | – | 1 | – | 0 | 9 | – | 2 | – | 0 |
| NC State + | 6 | – | 1 | – | 0 | 8 | – | 3 | – | 0 |
| Clemson | 5 | – | 2 | – | 0 | 5 | – | 4 | – | 1 |
| Duke | 5 | – | 2 | – | 0 | 5 | – | 4 | – | 1 |
| Maryland | 2 | – | 5 | – | 0 | 3 | – | 7 | – | 0 |
| South Carolina | 1 | – | 5 | – | 1 | 1 | – | 8 | – | 1 |
| Wake Forest | 1 | – | 5 | – | 0 | 1 | – | 9 | – | 0 |
| Virginia | 0 | – | 5 | – | 1 | 2 | – | 7 | – | 1 |
+ – Conference co-champions; Rankings from AP Poll

1964 Atlantic Coast Conference football standings
| | Conf. | | | | | Overall |
| Team | W | | L | | T | W | | L | | T |
|---|---|---|---|---|---|---|---|---|---|---|
| NC State $ | 5 | – | 2 | – | 0 | 5 | – | 5 | – | 0 |
| Duke | 3 | – | 2 | – | 1 | 4 | – | 5 | – | 1 |
| Maryland | 4 | – | 3 | – | 0 | 5 | – | 5 | – | 0 |
| North Carolina | 4 | – | 3 | – | 0 | 5 | – | 5 | – | 0 |
| Wake Forest | 4 | – | 3 | – | 0 | 5 | – | 5 | – | 0 |
| South Carolina | 2 | – | 3 | – | 1 | 3 | – | 5 | – | 2 |
| Clemson | 2 | – | 4 | – | 0 | 3 | – | 7 | – | 0 |
| Virginia | 1 | – | 5 | – | 0 | 5 | – | 5 | – | 0 |
$ – Conference champion; Rankings from AP Poll

1965 Atlantic Coast Conference football standings
| | Conf. | | | | | Overall |
| Team | W | | L | | T | W | | L | | T |
|---|---|---|---|---|---|---|---|---|---|---|
| NC State + | 5 | – | 2 | – | 0 | 6 | – | 4 | – | 0† |
| Clemson + | 5 | – | 2 | – | 0 | 5 | – | 5 | – | 0† |
| Duke | 4 | – | 2 | – | 0 | 6 | – | 4 | – | 0 |
| Maryland | 3 | – | 3 | – | 0 | 4 | – | 6 | – | 0 |
| North Carolina | 3 | – | 3 | – | 0 | 4 | – | 6 | – | 0 |
| Virginia | 3 | – | 3 | – | 0 | 4 | – | 6 | – | 0† |
| Wake Forest | 2 | – | 4 | – | 0 | 3 | – | 7 | – | 0† |
| South Carolina | 0 | – | 6 | – | 0 | 5 | – | 5 | – | 0† |
+ – Conference co-champions; † South Carolina forfeited its 4 conference wins (Clemson, NC State, Virginia, Wake Forest) due to use of ineligible players. This improved Clemson and NC State from 4–3 to 5–2, making them co-champions. Overall records did not change due to the forfeits. Duke and South Carolina were originally co-champions with records of 4–2.

1966 Atlantic Coast Conference football standings
| | Conf. | | | | | Overall |
| Team | W | | L | | T | W | | L | | T |
|---|---|---|---|---|---|---|---|---|---|---|
| Clemson $ | 6 | – | 1 | – | 0 | 6 | – | 4 | – | 0 |
| NC State | 5 | – | 2 | – | 0 | 5 | – | 5 | – | 0 |
| Maryland | 3 | – | 3 | – | 0 | 4 | – | 6 | – | 0 |
| Virginia | 3 | – | 3 | – | 0 | 4 | – | 6 | – | 0 |
| Duke | 2 | – | 3 | – | 0 | 5 | – | 5 | – | 0 |
| Wake Forest | 2 | – | 4 | – | 0 | 3 | – | 7 | – | 0 |
| South Carolina | 1 | – | 3 | – | 0 | 1 | – | 9 | – | 0 |
| North Carolina | 1 | – | 4 | – | 0 | 2 | – | 8 | – | 0 |
$ – Conference champion

1967 Atlantic Coast Conference football standings
| | Conf. | | | | | Overall |
| Team | W | | L | | T | W | | L | | T |
|---|---|---|---|---|---|---|---|---|---|---|
| Clemson $ | 6 | – | 0 | – | 0 | 6 | – | 4 | – | 0 |
| NC State | 5 | – | 1 | – | 0 | 9 | – | 2 | – | 0 |
| South Carolina | 4 | – | 2 | – | 0 | 5 | – | 5 | – | 0 |
| Virginia | 3 | – | 3 | – | 0 | 5 | – | 5 | – | 0 |
| Wake Forest | 3 | – | 4 | – | 0 | 4 | – | 6 | – | 0 |
| Duke | 2 | – | 4 | – | 0 | 4 | – | 6 | – | 0 |
| North Carolina | 2 | – | 5 | – | 0 | 2 | – | 8 | – | 0 |
| Maryland | 0 | – | 6 | – | 0 | 0 | – | 9 | – | 0 |
$ – Conference champion

1968 Atlantic Coast Conference football standings
| | Conf. | | | | | Overall |
| Team | W | | L | | T | W | | L | | T |
|---|---|---|---|---|---|---|---|---|---|---|
| NC State $ | 6 | – | 1 | – | 0 | 6 | – | 4 | – | 0 |
| Clemson | 4 | – | 1 | – | 1 | 4 | – | 5 | – | 1 |
| Virginia | 4 | – | 2 | – | 0 | 7 | – | 3 | – | 0 |
| South Carolina | 4 | – | 3 | – | 0 | 4 | – | 6 | – | 0 |
| Duke | 3 | – | 4 | – | 0 | 4 | – | 6 | – | 0 |
| Wake Forest | 2 | – | 3 | – | 1 | 2 | – | 7 | – | 1 |
| Maryland | 2 | – | 5 | – | 0 | 2 | – | 8 | – | 0 |
| North Carolina | 1 | – | 6 | – | 0 | 3 | – | 7 | – | 0 |
$ – Conference champion; Virginia's game against Navy counted in the conference standings.

1969 Atlantic Coast Conference football standings
| | Conf. | | | | | Overall |
| Team | W | | L | | T | W | | L | | T |
|---|---|---|---|---|---|---|---|---|---|---|
| South Carolina $ | 6 | – | 0 | – | 0 | 7 | – | 4 | – | 0 |
| NC State | 3 | – | 2 | – | 1 | 3 | – | 6 | – | 1 |
| North Carolina | 3 | – | 3 | – | 0 | 5 | – | 5 | – | 0 |
| Clemson | 3 | – | 3 | – | 0 | 4 | – | 6 | – | 0 |
| Duke | 3 | – | 3 | – | 1 | 3 | – | 6 | – | 1 |
| Maryland | 3 | – | 3 | – | 0 | 3 | – | 7 | – | 0 |
| Wake Forest | 2 | – | 5 | – | 0 | 3 | – | 7 | – | 0 |
| Virginia | 1 | – | 5 | – | 0 | 3 | – | 7 | – | 0 |
$ – Conference champion; Rankings from AP Poll

1970 Atlantic Coast Conference football standings
| | Conf. | | | | | Overall |
| Team | W | | L | | T | W | | L | | T |
|---|---|---|---|---|---|---|---|---|---|---|
| Wake Forest $ | 5 | – | 1 | – | 0 | 6 | – | 5 | – | 0 |
| North Carolina | 5 | – | 2 | – | 0 | 8 | – | 4 | – | 0 |
| Duke | 5 | – | 2 | – | 0 | 6 | – | 5 | – | 0 |
| South Carolina | 3 | – | 2 | – | 1 | 4 | – | 6 | – | 1 |
| NC State | 2 | – | 3 | – | 1 | 3 | – | 7 | – | 1 |
| Clemson | 2 | – | 4 | – | 0 | 3 | – | 8 | – | 0 |
| Maryland | 2 | – | 4 | – | 0 | 2 | – | 9 | – | 0 |
| Virginia | 0 | – | 6 | – | 0 | 5 | – | 6 | – | 0 |
$ – Conference champion; Rankings from AP Poll

1971 Atlantic Coast Conference football standings
| | Conf. | | | | | Overall |
| Team | W | | L | | T | W | | L | | T |
|---|---|---|---|---|---|---|---|---|---|---|
| North Carolina $ | 6 | – | 0 | – | 0 | 9 | – | 3 | – | 0 |
| Clemson | 4 | – | 2 | – | 0 | 5 | – | 6 | – | 0 |
| Duke | 2 | – | 3 | – | 0 | 6 | – | 5 | – | 0 |
| Wake Forest | 2 | – | 3 | – | 0 | 6 | – | 5 | – | 0 |
| Virginia | 2 | – | 3 | – | 0 | 3 | – | 8 | – | 0 |
| NC State | 2 | – | 4 | – | 0 | 3 | – | 8 | – | 0 |
| Maryland | 1 | – | 4 | – | 0 | 2 | – | 9 | – | 0 |
$ – Conference champion; Rankings from AP Poll

1972 Atlantic Coast Conference football standings
| | Conf. | | | | | Overall |
| Team | W | | L | | T | W | | L | | T |
|---|---|---|---|---|---|---|---|---|---|---|
| No. 12 North Carolina $ | 6 | – | 0 | – | 0 | 11 | – | 1 | – | 0 |
| No. 17 NC State | 4 | – | 1 | – | 1 | 8 | – | 3 | – | 1 |
| Maryland | 3 | – | 2 | – | 1 | 5 | – | 5 | – | 1 |
| Duke | 3 | – | 3 | – | 0 | 5 | – | 6 | – | 0 |
| Clemson | 2 | – | 4 | – | 0 | 4 | – | 7 | – | 0 |
| Virginia | 1 | – | 5 | – | 0 | 4 | – | 7 | – | 0 |
| Wake Forest | 1 | – | 5 | – | 0 | 2 | – | 9 | – | 0 |
$ – Conference champion; Rankings from AP Poll

1973 Atlantic Coast Conference football standings
| | Conf. | | | | | Overall |
| Team | W | | L | | T | W | | L | | T |
|---|---|---|---|---|---|---|---|---|---|---|
| No. 16 NC State $ | 6 | – | 0 | – | 0 | 9 | – | 3 | – | 0 |
| No. 20 Maryland | 5 | – | 1 | – | 0 | 8 | – | 4 | – | 0 |
| Clemson | 4 | – | 2 | – | 0 | 5 | – | 6 | – | 0 |
| Virginia | 3 | – | 3 | – | 0 | 4 | – | 7 | – | 0 |
| Duke | 1 | – | 4 | – | 1 | 2 | – | 8 | – | 1 |
| North Carolina | 1 | – | 5 | – | 0 | 4 | – | 7 | – | 0 |
| Wake Forest | 0 | – | 5 | – | 1 | 1 | – | 9 | – | 1 |
$ – Conference champion; Rankings from AP Poll

1974 Atlantic Coast Conference football standings
| | Conf. | | | | | Overall |
| Team | W | | L | | T | W | | L | | T |
|---|---|---|---|---|---|---|---|---|---|---|
| No. 13 Maryland $ | 6 | – | 0 | – | 0 | 8 | – | 4 | – | 0 |
| No. 11 NC State | 4 | – | 2 | – | 0 | 9 | – | 2 | – | 1 |
| Clemson | 4 | – | 2 | – | 0 | 7 | – | 4 | – | 0 |
| North Carolina | 4 | – | 2 | – | 0 | 7 | – | 5 | – | 0 |
| Duke | 2 | – | 4 | – | 0 | 6 | – | 5 | – | 0 |
| Virginia | 1 | – | 5 | – | 0 | 4 | – | 7 | – | 0 |
| Wake Forest | 0 | – | 6 | – | 0 | 1 | – | 10 | – | 0 |
$ – Conference champion; Rankings from AP Poll

1975 Atlantic Coast Conference football standings
| | Conf. | | | | | Overall |
| Team | W | | L | | T | W | | L | | T |
|---|---|---|---|---|---|---|---|---|---|---|
| No. 13 Maryland $ | 5 | – | 0 | – | 0 | 9 | – | 2 | – | 1 |
| Duke | 3 | – | 0 | – | 2 | 4 | – | 5 | – | 2 |
| NC State | 2 | – | 2 | – | 1 | 7 | – | 4 | – | 1 |
| Wake Forest | 3 | – | 3 | – | 0 | 3 | – | 8 | – | 0 |
| Clemson | 2 | – | 3 | – | 0 | 2 | – | 9 | – | 0 |
| North Carolina | 1 | – | 4 | – | 1 | 3 | – | 7 | – | 1 |
| Virginia | 0 | – | 4 | – | 0 | 1 | – | 10 | – | 0 |
$ – Conference champion; Rankings from AP Poll

1976 Atlantic Coast Conference football standings
| | Conf. | | | | | Overall |
| Team | W | | L | | T | W | | L | | T |
|---|---|---|---|---|---|---|---|---|---|---|
| No. 8 Maryland $ | 5 | – | 0 | – | 0 | 11 | – | 1 | – | 0 |
| North Carolina | 4 | – | 1 | – | 0 | 9 | – | 3 | – | 0 |
| Wake Forest | 3 | – | 3 | – | 0 | 5 | – | 6 | – | 0 |
| Duke | 2 | – | 3 | – | 1 | 5 | – | 5 | – | 1 |
| NC State | 2 | – | 3 | – | 0 | 3 | – | 7 | – | 1 |
| Virginia | 1 | – | 3 | – | 0 | 2 | – | 9 | – | 0 |
| Clemson | 0 | – | 4 | – | 1 | 3 | – | 6 | – | 2 |
$ – Conference champion; Rankings from AP Poll

1977 Atlantic Coast Conference football standings
| | Conf. | | | | | Overall |
| Team | W | | L | | T | W | | L | | T |
|---|---|---|---|---|---|---|---|---|---|---|
| No. 17 North Carolina $ | 5 | – | 0 | – | 1 | 8 | – | 3 | – | 1 |
| No. 19 Clemson | 4 | – | 1 | – | 1 | 8 | – | 3 | – | 1 |
| NC State | 4 | – | 2 | – | 0 | 8 | – | 4 | – | 0 |
| Maryland | 4 | – | 2 | – | 0 | 8 | – | 4 | – | 0 |
| Duke | 2 | – | 4 | – | 0 | 5 | – | 6 | – | 0 |
| Virginia | 1 | – | 5 | – | 0 | 1 | – | 9 | – | 1 |
| Wake Forest | 0 | – | 6 | – | 0 | 1 | – | 10 | – | 0 |
$ – Conference champion; Rankings from AP Poll

1978 Atlantic Coast Conference football standings
| | Conf. | | | | | Overall |
| Team | W | | L | | T | W | | L | | T |
|---|---|---|---|---|---|---|---|---|---|---|
| No. 6 Clemson $ | 6 | – | 0 | – | 0 | 11 | – | 1 | – | 0 |
| No. 20 Maryland | 5 | – | 1 | – | 0 | 9 | – | 3 | – | 0 |
| No. 18 NC State | 4 | – | 2 | – | 0 | 9 | – | 3 | – | 0 |
| North Carolina | 3 | – | 3 | – | 0 | 5 | – | 6 | – | 0 |
| Duke | 2 | – | 4 | – | 0 | 4 | – | 7 | – | 0 |
| Wake Forest | 1 | – | 5 | – | 0 | 1 | – | 10 | – | 0 |
| Virginia | 0 | – | 6 | – | 0 | 2 | – | 9 | – | 0 |
$ – Conference champion; Rankings from AP Poll

1979 Atlantic Coast Conference football standings
| | Conf. | | | | | Overall |
| Team | W | | L | | T | W | | L | | T |
|---|---|---|---|---|---|---|---|---|---|---|
| NC State $ | 5 | – | 1 | – | 0 | 7 | – | 4 | – | 0 |
| Clemson | 4 | – | 2 | – | 0 | 8 | – | 4 | – | 0 |
| Maryland | 4 | – | 2 | – | 0 | 7 | – | 4 | – | 0 |
| Wake Forest | 3 | – | 2 | – | 0 | 8 | – | 4 | – | 0 |
| No. 15 North Carolina | 3 | – | 3 | – | 0 | 8 | – | 3 | – | 1 |
| Virginia | 1 | – | 4 | – | 0 | 6 | – | 5 | – | 0 |
| Duke | 0 | – | 6 | – | 0 | 2 | – | 8 | – | 1 |
$ – Conference champion; Rankings from AP Poll

1980 Atlantic Coast Conference football standings
| | Conf. | | | | | Overall |
| Team | W | | L | | T | W | | L | | T |
|---|---|---|---|---|---|---|---|---|---|---|
| No. 10 North Carolina $ | 6 | – | 0 | – | 0 | 11 | – | 1 | – | 0 |
| Maryland | 5 | – | 1 | – | 0 | 8 | – | 4 | – | 0 |
| NC State | 3 | – | 3 | – | 0 | 6 | – | 5 | – | 0 |
| Clemson | 2 | – | 4 | – | 0 | 6 | – | 5 | – | 0 |
| Wake Forest | 2 | – | 4 | – | 0 | 5 | – | 6 | – | 0 |
| Virginia | 2 | – | 4 | – | 0 | 4 | – | 7 | – | 0 |
| Duke | 1 | – | 5 | – | 0 | 2 | – | 9 | – | 0 |
$ – Conference champion; Rankings from AP Poll

1981 Atlantic Coast Conference football standings
| | Conf. | | | | | Overall |
| Team | W | | L | | T | W | | L | | T |
|---|---|---|---|---|---|---|---|---|---|---|
| No. 1 Clemson $ | 6 | – | 0 | – | 0 | 12 | – | 0 | – | 0 |
| No. 9 North Carolina | 5 | – | 1 | – | 0 | 10 | – | 2 | – | 0 |
| Maryland | 4 | – | 2 | – | 0 | 4 | – | 6 | – | 1 |
| Duke | 3 | – | 3 | – | 0 | 6 | – | 5 | – | 0 |
| NC State | 2 | – | 4 | – | 0 | 4 | – | 7 | – | 0 |
| Wake Forest | 1 | – | 5 | – | 0 | 4 | – | 7 | – | 0 |
| Virginia | 0 | – | 6 | – | 0 | 1 | – | 10 | – | 0 |
$ – Conference champion; Rankings from AP Poll

1982 Atlantic Coast Conference football standings
| | Conf. | | | | | Overall |
| Team | W | | L | | T | W | | L | | T |
|---|---|---|---|---|---|---|---|---|---|---|
| No. 8 Clemson $ | 6 | – | 0 | – | 0 | 9 | – | 1 | – | 1 |
| No. 20 Maryland | 5 | – | 1 | – | 0 | 8 | – | 4 | – | 0 |
| No. 18 North Carolina | 3 | – | 3 | – | 0 | 8 | – | 4 | – | 0 |
| Duke | 3 | – | 3 | – | 0 | 6 | – | 5 | – | 0 |
| NC State | 3 | – | 3 | – | 0 | 6 | – | 5 | – | 0 |
| Virginia | 1 | – | 5 | – | 0 | 2 | – | 9 | – | 0 |
| Wake Forest | 0 | – | 6 | – | 0 | 3 | – | 8 | – | 0 |
$ – Conference champion; Rankings from AP Poll

1983 Atlantic Coast Conference football standings
| | Conf. | | | | | Overall |
| Team | W | | L | | T | W | | L | | T |
|---|---|---|---|---|---|---|---|---|---|---|
| Maryland $ | 5 | – | 0 | – | 0 | 8 | – | 4 | – | 0 |
| North Carolina | 4 | – | 2 | – | 0 | 8 | – | 4 | – | 0 |
| Georgia Tech | 3 | – | 2 | – | 0 | 3 | – | 8 | – | 0 |
| Virginia | 3 | – | 3 | – | 0 | 6 | – | 5 | – | 0 |
| Duke | 3 | – | 3 | – | 0 | 3 | – | 8 | – | 0 |
| Wake Forest | 1 | – | 5 | – | 0 | 4 | – | 7 | – | 0 |
| NC State | 1 | – | 5 | – | 0 | 3 | – | 8 | – | 0 |
| No. 11 Clemson * | 0 | – | 0 | – | 0 | 9 | – | 1 | – | 1 |
$ – Conference champion; * – Clemson was under NCAA and ACC probation and was ineligible for the ACC title. As a result, their ACC games did not count in the league standings.; Rankings from AP Poll

1984 Atlantic Coast Conference football standings
| | Conf. | | | | | Overall |
| Team | W | | L | | T | W | | L | | T |
|---|---|---|---|---|---|---|---|---|---|---|
| No. 12 Maryland $ | 5 | – | 0 | – | 0 | 9 | – | 3 | – | 0 |
| No. 20 Virginia | 3 | – | 1 | – | 2 | 8 | – | 2 | – | 2 |
| North Carolina | 3 | – | 2 | – | 1 | 5 | – | 5 | – | 1 |
| Wake Forest | 3 | – | 3 | – | 0 | 6 | – | 5 | – | 0 |
| Georgia Tech | 2 | – | 2 | – | 1 | 6 | – | 4 | – | 1 |
| NC State | 1 | – | 5 | – | 0 | 3 | – | 8 | – | 0 |
| Duke | 1 | – | 5 | – | 0 | 2 | – | 9 | – | 0 |
| Clemson | 0 | – | 0 | – | 0* | 7 | – | 4 | – | 0 |
$ – Conference champion; * – Clemson was under NCAA and ACC probation and was ineligible for the ACC title. As a result, their ACC games did not count in the league standings.; Rankings from AP Poll

1985 Atlantic Coast Conference football standings
| | Conf. | | | | | Overall |
| Team | W | | L | | T | W | | L | | T |
|---|---|---|---|---|---|---|---|---|---|---|
| No. 18 Maryland $ | 6 | – | 0 | – | 0 | 9 | – | 3 | – | 0 |
| No. 19 Georgia Tech | 5 | – | 1 | – | 0 | 9 | – | 2 | – | 1 |
| Virginia | 4 | – | 3 | – | 0 | 6 | – | 5 | – | 0 |
| Clemson | 4 | – | 3 | – | 0 | 6 | – | 6 | – | 0 |
| North Carolina | 3 | – | 4 | – | 0 | 5 | – | 6 | – | 0 |
| Duke | 2 | – | 5 | – | 0 | 4 | – | 7 | – | 0 |
| NC State | 2 | – | 5 | – | 0 | 3 | – | 8 | – | 0 |
| Wake Forest | 1 | – | 6 | – | 0 | 4 | – | 7 | – | 0 |
$ – Conference champion; Rankings from AP Poll

1986 Atlantic Coast Conference football standings
| | Conf. | | | | | Overall |
| Team | W | | L | | T | W | | L | | T |
|---|---|---|---|---|---|---|---|---|---|---|
| No. 17 Clemson $ | 5 | – | 1 | – | 1 | 8 | – | 2 | – | 2 |
| NC State | 5 | – | 2 | – | 0 | 8 | – | 3 | – | 1 |
| North Carolina | 5 | – | 2 | – | 0 | 7 | – | 4 | – | 1 |
| Georgia Tech | 3 | – | 3 | – | 0 | 5 | – | 5 | – | 1 |
| Maryland | 2 | – | 3 | – | 1 | 5 | – | 5 | – | 1 |
| Wake Forest | 2 | – | 5 | – | 0 | 5 | – | 6 | – | 0 |
| Duke | 2 | – | 5 | – | 0 | 4 | – | 7 | – | 0 |
| Virginia | 2 | – | 5 | – | 0 | 3 | – | 8 | – | 0 |
$ – Conference champion; Rankings from AP Poll

1987 Atlantic Coast Conference football standings
| | Conf. | | | | | Overall |
| Team | W | | L | | T | W | | L | | T |
|---|---|---|---|---|---|---|---|---|---|---|
| No. 12 Clemson $ | 6 | – | 1 | – | 0 | 10 | – | 2 | – | 0 |
| Virginia | 5 | – | 2 | – | 0 | 8 | – | 4 | – | 0 |
| Wake Forest | 4 | – | 3 | – | 0 | 7 | – | 4 | – | 0 |
| NC State | 4 | – | 3 | – | 0 | 4 | – | 7 | – | 0 |
| Maryland | 3 | – | 3 | – | 0 | 4 | – | 7 | – | 0 |
| North Carolina | 3 | – | 4 | – | 0 | 5 | – | 6 | – | 0 |
| Duke | 2 | – | 5 | – | 0 | 5 | – | 6 | – | 0 |
| Georgia Tech | 0 | – | 6 | – | 0 | 2 | – | 9 | – | 0 |
$ – Conference champion; Rankings from AP Poll

1988 Atlantic Coast Conference football standings
| | Conf. | | | | | Overall |
| Team | W | | L | | T | W | | L | | T |
|---|---|---|---|---|---|---|---|---|---|---|
| No. 9 Clemson $ | 6 | – | 1 | – | 0 | 10 | – | 2 | – | 0 |
| Virginia | 5 | – | 2 | – | 0 | 7 | – | 4 | – | 0 |
| NC State | 4 | – | 2 | – | 1 | 8 | – | 3 | – | 1 |
| Wake Forest | 4 | – | 3 | – | 0 | 6 | – | 4 | – | 1 |
| Maryland | 4 | – | 3 | – | 0 | 5 | – | 6 | – | 0 |
| Duke | 3 | – | 3 | – | 1 | 7 | – | 3 | – | 1 |
| North Carolina | 1 | – | 6 | – | 0 | 1 | – | 10 | – | 0 |
| Georgia Tech | 0 | – | 7 | – | 0 | 3 | – | 8 | – | 0 |
$ – Conference champion; Rankings from AP Poll

1989 Atlantic Coast Conference football standings
| | Conf. | | | | | Overall |
| Team | W | | L | | T | W | | L | | T |
|---|---|---|---|---|---|---|---|---|---|---|
| No. 18 Virginia + | 6 | – | 1 | – | 0 | 10 | – | 3 | – | 0 |
| Duke + | 6 | – | 1 | – | 0 | 8 | – | 4 | – | 0 |
| No. 12 Clemson | 5 | – | 2 | – | 0 | 10 | – | 2 | – | 0 |
| Georgia Tech | 4 | – | 3 | – | 0 | 7 | – | 4 | – | 0 |
| NC State | 4 | – | 3 | – | 0 | 7 | – | 5 | – | 0 |
| Maryland | 2 | – | 5 | – | 0 | 3 | – | 7 | – | 1 |
| Wake Forest | 1 | – | 6 | – | 0 | 2 | – | 8 | – | 1 |
| North Carolina | 0 | – | 7 | – | 0 | 1 | – | 10 | – | 0 |
+ – Conference co-champions; Rankings from AP Poll

1990 Atlantic Coast Conference football standings
| | Conf. | | | | | Overall |
| Team | W | | L | | T | W | | L | | T |
|---|---|---|---|---|---|---|---|---|---|---|
| No. 2 Georgia Tech $ | 6 | – | 0 | – | 1 | 11 | – | 0 | – | 1 |
| No. 9 Clemson | 5 | – | 2 | – | 0 | 10 | – | 2 | – | 0 |
| No. 23 Virginia | 5 | – | 2 | – | 0 | 8 | – | 4 | – | 0 |
| Maryland | 4 | – | 3 | – | 0 | 6 | – | 5 | – | 1 |
| North Carolina | 3 | – | 3 | – | 1 | 6 | – | 4 | – | 1 |
| NC State | 3 | – | 4 | – | 0 | 7 | – | 5 | – | 0 |
| Duke | 1 | – | 6 | – | 0 | 4 | – | 7 | – | 0 |
| Wake Forest | 0 | – | 7 | – | 0 | 3 | – | 8 | – | 0 |
$ – Conference champion; Rankings from AP Poll

1991 Atlantic Coast Conference football standings
| | Conf. | | | | | Overall |
| Team | W | | L | | T | W | | L | | T |
|---|---|---|---|---|---|---|---|---|---|---|
| No. 18 Clemson $ | 6 | – | 0 | – | 1 | 9 | – | 2 | – | 1 |
| No. 24 NC State | 5 | – | 2 | – | 0 | 9 | – | 3 | – | 0 |
| Georgia Tech | 5 | – | 2 | – | 0 | 8 | – | 5 | – | 0 |
| Virginia | 4 | – | 2 | – | 1 | 8 | – | 3 | – | 1 |
| North Carolina | 3 | – | 4 | – | 0 | 7 | – | 4 | – | 0 |
| Maryland | 2 | – | 5 | – | 0 | 2 | – | 9 | – | 0 |
| Duke | 1 | – | 6 | – | 0 | 4 | – | 6 | – | 1 |
| Wake Forest | 1 | – | 6 | – | 0 | 3 | – | 8 | – | 0 |
$ – Conference champion; Rankings from AP Poll

1992 Atlantic Coast Conference football standings
| | Conf. | | | | | Overall |
| Team | W | | L | | T | W | | L | | T |
|---|---|---|---|---|---|---|---|---|---|---|
| No. 2 Florida State $ | 8 | – | 0 | – | 0 | 11 | – | 1 | – | 0 |
| No. 17 NC State | 6 | – | 2 | – | 0 | 9 | – | 3 | – | 1 |
| No. 19 North Carolina | 5 | – | 3 | – | 0 | 9 | – | 3 | – | 0 |
| No. 25 Wake Forest | 4 | – | 4 | – | 0 | 8 | – | 4 | – | 0 |
| Virginia | 4 | – | 4 | – | 0 | 7 | – | 4 | – | 0 |
| Georgia Tech | 4 | – | 4 | – | 0 | 5 | – | 6 | – | 0 |
| Clemson | 3 | – | 5 | – | 0 | 5 | – | 6 | – | 0 |
| Maryland | 2 | – | 6 | – | 0 | 3 | – | 8 | – | 0 |
| Duke | 0 | – | 8 | – | 0 | 2 | – | 9 | – | 0 |
$ – Conference champion; Rankings from AP Poll

1993 Atlantic Coast Conference football standings
| | Conf. | | | Overall |
| Team | W | | L | W | | L |
|---|---|---|---|---|---|---|
| No. 1 Florida State $ | 8 | – | 0 | 12 | – | 1 |
| No. 19 North Carolina | 6 | – | 2 | 10 | – | 3 |
| No. 23 Clemson | 5 | – | 3 | 9 | – | 3 |
| Virginia | 5 | – | 3 | 7 | – | 5 |
| NC State | 4 | – | 4 | 7 | – | 5 |
| Georgia Tech | 3 | – | 5 | 5 | – | 6 |
| Duke | 2 | – | 6 | 3 | – | 8 |
| Maryland | 2 | – | 6 | 2 | – | 9 |
| Wake Forest | 1 | – | 7 | 2 | – | 9 |
$ – Conference champion; Rankings from AP Poll

1994 Atlantic Coast Conference football standings
| | Conf. | | | | | Overall |
| Team | W | | L | | T | W | | L | | T |
|---|---|---|---|---|---|---|---|---|---|---|
| No. 4 Florida State $ | 8 | – | 0 | – | 0 | 10 | – | 1 | – | 1 |
| No. 17 NC State | 6 | – | 2 | – | 0 | 9 | – | 3 | – | 0 |
| No. 15 Virginia | 5 | – | 3 | – | 0 | 9 | – | 3 | – | 0 |
| Duke | 5 | – | 3 | – | 0 | 8 | – | 4 | – | 0 |
| North Carolina | 5 | – | 3 | – | 0 | 8 | – | 4 | – | 0 |
| Clemson | 4 | – | 4 | – | 0 | 5 | – | 6 | – | 0 |
| Maryland | 2 | – | 6 | – | 0 | 4 | – | 7 | – | 0 |
| Wake Forest | 1 | – | 7 | – | 0 | 3 | – | 8 | – | 0 |
| Georgia Tech | 0 | – | 8 | – | 0 | 1 | – | 10 | – | 0 |
$ – Conference champion; Rankings from AP Poll

1995 Atlantic Coast Conference football standings
| | Conf. | | | Overall |
| Team | W | | L | W | | L |
|---|---|---|---|---|---|---|
| No. 4 Florida State + | 7 | – | 1 | 10 | – | 2 |
| No. 16 Virginia + | 7 | – | 1 | 9 | – | 4 |
| Clemson | 6 | – | 2 | 8 | – | 4 |
| Georgia Tech | 5 | – | 3 | 6 | – | 5 |
| North Carolina | 4 | – | 4 | 7 | – | 5 |
| Maryland | 4 | – | 4 | 6 | – | 5 |
| NC State | 2 | – | 6 | 3 | – | 8 |
| Duke | 1 | – | 7 | 3 | – | 8 |
| Wake Forest | 0 | – | 8 | 1 | – | 10 |
+ – Conference co-champions; Rankings from AP Poll

1996 Atlantic Coast Conference football standings
| | Conf. | | | Overall |
| Team | W | | L | W | | L |
|---|---|---|---|---|---|---|
| No. 3 Florida State $ | 8 | – | 0 | 11 | – | 1 |
| No. 10 North Carolina | 6 | – | 2 | 10 | – | 2 |
| Clemson | 6 | – | 2 | 7 | – | 5 |
| Virginia | 5 | – | 3 | 7 | – | 5 |
| Georgia Tech | 4 | – | 4 | 5 | – | 6 |
| Maryland | 3 | – | 5 | 5 | – | 6 |
| NC State | 3 | – | 5 | 3 | – | 8 |
| Wake Forest | 1 | – | 7 | 3 | – | 8 |
| Duke | 0 | – | 8 | 0 | – | 11 |
$ – Conference champion; Rankings from AP Poll

1997 Atlantic Coast Conference football standings
| | Conf. | | | Overall |
| Team | W | | L | W | | L |
|---|---|---|---|---|---|---|
| No. 3 Florida State $ | 8 | – | 0 | 11 | – | 1 |
| No. 6 North Carolina | 7 | – | 1 | 11 | – | 1 |
| Virginia | 5 | – | 3 | 7 | – | 4 |
| No. 25 Georgia Tech | 5 | – | 3 | 7 | – | 5 |
| Clemson | 4 | – | 4 | 7 | – | 5 |
| NC State | 3 | – | 5 | 6 | – | 5 |
| Wake Forest | 3 | – | 5 | 5 | – | 6 |
| Maryland | 1 | – | 7 | 2 | – | 9 |
| Duke | 0 | – | 8 | 2 | – | 9 |
$ – Conference champion; Rankings from AP Poll

1998 Atlantic Coast Conference football standings
| | Conf. | | | Overall |
| Team | W | | L | W | | L |
|---|---|---|---|---|---|---|
| No. 3 Florida State $+ | 7 | – | 1 | 11 | – | 2 |
| No. 9 Georgia Tech + | 7 | – | 1 | 10 | – | 2 |
| No. 18 Virginia | 6 | – | 2 | 9 | – | 3 |
| North Carolina | 5 | – | 3 | 7 | – | 5 |
| NC State | 5 | – | 3 | 7 | – | 5 |
| Duke | 2 | – | 6 | 4 | – | 7 |
| Wake Forest | 2 | – | 6 | 3 | – | 8 |
| Clemson | 1 | – | 7 | 3 | – | 8 |
| Maryland | 1 | – | 7 | 3 | – | 8 |
$ – BCS representative as conference champion; + – Conference co-champions; Rankings from AP Poll

1999 Atlantic Coast Conference football standings
| | Conf. | | | Overall |
| Team | W | | L | W | | L |
|---|---|---|---|---|---|---|
| No. 1 Florida State $# | 8 | – | 0 | 12 | – | 0 |
| No. 17 Georgia Tech | 5 | – | 3 | 8 | – | 4 |
| Virginia | 5 | – | 3 | 7 | – | 5 |
| Clemson | 5 | – | 3 | 6 | – | 6 |
| Wake Forest | 3 | – | 5 | 7 | – | 5 |
| NC State | 3 | – | 5 | 6 | – | 6 |
| Duke | 3 | – | 5 | 3 | – | 8 |
| Maryland | 2 | – | 6 | 5 | – | 6 |
| North Carolina | 2 | – | 6 | 3 | – | 8 |
# – BCS National Champion; $ – BCS representative as conference champion; Rankings from AP Poll

2000 Atlantic Coast Conference football standings
| | Conf. | | | Overall |
| Team | W | | L | W | | L |
|---|---|---|---|---|---|---|
| No. 5 Florida State $ | 8 | – | 0 | 11 | – | 2 |
| No. 17 Georgia Tech | 6 | – | 2 | 9 | – | 3 |
| No. 16 Clemson | 6 | – | 2 | 9 | – | 3 |
| Virginia | 5 | – | 3 | 6 | – | 6 |
| NC State | 4 | – | 4 | 8 | – | 4 |
| North Carolina | 3 | – | 5 | 6 | – | 5 |
| Maryland | 3 | – | 5 | 5 | – | 6 |
| Wake Forest | 1 | – | 7 | 2 | – | 9 |
| Duke | 0 | – | 8 | 0 | – | 11 |
$ – BCS representative as conference champion; Rankings from AP Poll

2001 Atlantic Coast Conference football standings
| | Conf. | | | Overall |
| Team | W | | L | W | | L |
|---|---|---|---|---|---|---|
| No. 11 Maryland $ | 7 | – | 1 | 10 | – | 2 |
| No. 15 Florida State | 6 | – | 2 | 8 | – | 4 |
| North Carolina | 5 | – | 3 | 8 | – | 5 |
| Clemson | 4 | – | 4 | 7 | – | 5 |
| No. 24 Georgia Tech | 4 | – | 4 | 8 | – | 5 |
| NC State | 4 | – | 4 | 7 | – | 5 |
| Wake Forest | 3 | – | 5 | 6 | – | 5 |
| Virginia | 3 | – | 5 | 5 | – | 7 |
| Duke | 0 | – | 8 | 0 | – | 11 |
$ – BCS representative as conference champion; Rankings from AP Poll

2002 Atlantic Coast Conference football standings
| | Conf. | | | Overall |
| Team | W | | L | W | | L |
|---|---|---|---|---|---|---|
| No. 21 Florida State $ | 7 | – | 1 | 9 | – | 5 |
| No. 22 Virginia | 6 | – | 2 | 9 | – | 5 |
| No. 13 Maryland | 6 | – | 2 | 11 | – | 3 |
| No. 12 NC State | 5 | – | 3 | 11 | – | 3 |
| Clemson | 4 | – | 4 | 7 | – | 6 |
| Georgia Tech | 4 | – | 4 | 7 | – | 6 |
| Wake Forest | 3 | – | 5 | 7 | – | 6 |
| North Carolina | 1 | – | 7 | 3 | – | 9 |
| Duke | 0 | – | 8 | 2 | – | 10 |
$ – BCS representative as conference champion; Rankings from AP Poll

2003 Atlantic Coast Conference football standings
| | Conf. | | | Overall |
| Team | W | | L | W | | L |
|---|---|---|---|---|---|---|
| No. 11 Florida State $ | 7 | – | 1 | 10 | – | 3 |
| No. 17 Maryland | 6 | – | 2 | 10 | – | 3 |
| No. 22 Clemson | 5 | – | 3 | 9 | – | 4 |
| NC State | 4 | – | 4 | 8 | – | 5 |
| Virginia | 4 | – | 4 | 8 | – | 5 |
| Georgia Tech | 4 | – | 4 | 7 | – | 6 |
| Wake Forest | 3 | – | 5 | 5 | – | 7 |
| Duke | 2 | – | 6 | 4 | – | 8 |
| North Carolina | 1 | – | 7 | 2 | – | 10 |
$ – BCS representative as conference champion; Rankings from AP Poll

2004 Atlantic Coast Conference football standings
| | Conf. | | | Overall |
| Team | W | | L | W | | L |
|---|---|---|---|---|---|---|
| No. 10 Virginia Tech $ | 7 | – | 1 | 10 | – | 3 |
| No. 15 Florida State | 6 | – | 2 | 9 | – | 3 |
| No. 11 Miami (FL) | 5 | – | 3 | 9 | – | 3 |
| No. 23 Virginia | 5 | – | 3 | 8 | – | 4 |
| North Carolina | 5 | – | 3 | 6 | – | 6 |
| Georgia Tech | 4 | – | 4 | 7 | – | 5 |
| Clemson | 4 | – | 4 | 6 | – | 5 |
| NC State | 3 | – | 5 | 5 | – | 6 |
| Maryland | 3 | – | 5 | 5 | – | 6 |
| Wake Forest | 1 | – | 7 | 4 | – | 7 |
| Duke | 1 | – | 7 | 2 | – | 9 |
$ – BCS representative as conference champion; Rankings from AP Poll

2005 Atlantic Coast Conference football standings
| | Conf. | | | Overall |
| Team | W | | L | W | | L |
|---|---|---|---|---|---|---|
Atlantic Division
| No. 23 Florida State xy$ | 5 | – | 3 | 8 | – | 5 |
| No. 18 Boston College x | 5 | – | 3 | 9 | – | 3 |
| No. 21 Clemson | 4 | – | 4 | 8 | – | 4 |
| Wake Forest | 3 | – | 5 | 4 | – | 7 |
| NC State | 3 | – | 5 | 7 | – | 5 |
| Maryland | 3 | – | 5 | 5 | – | 6 |
Coastal Division
| No. 7 Virginia Tech x | 7 | – | 1 | 11 | – | 2 |
| No. 17 Miami (FL) | 6 | – | 2 | 9 | – | 3 |
| Georgia Tech | 5 | – | 3 | 7 | – | 5 |
| North Carolina | 4 | – | 4 | 5 | – | 6 |
| Virginia | 3 | – | 5 | 7 | – | 5 |
| Duke | 0 | – | 8 | 1 | – | 10 |
Championship: Florida State 27, Virginia Tech 22
$ – BCS representative as conference champion; x – Division champion/co-champions; y – Championship game participant; Rankings from AP Poll

2006 Atlantic Coast Conference football standings
| | Conf. | | | Overall |
| Team | W | | L | W | | L |
|---|---|---|---|---|---|---|
Atlantic Division
| No. 18 Wake Forest x$ | 6 | – | 2 | 11 | – | 3 |
| No. 20 Boston College | 5 | – | 3 | 10 | – | 3 |
| Maryland | 5 | – | 3 | 9 | – | 4 |
| Clemson | 5 | – | 3 | 8 | – | 5 |
| Florida State | 3 | – | 5 | 7 | – | 6 |
| NC State | 2 | – | 6 | 3 | – | 9 |
Coastal Division
| Georgia Tech x | 7 | – | 1 | 9 | – | 5 |
| No. 19 Virginia Tech | 6 | – | 2 | 10 | – | 3 |
| Virginia | 4 | – | 4 | 5 | – | 7 |
| Miami (FL) | 3 | – | 5 | 7 | – | 6 |
| North Carolina | 2 | – | 6 | 3 | – | 9 |
| Duke | 0 | – | 8 | 0 | – | 12 |
Championship: Wake Forest 9, Georgia Tech 6
$ – BCS representative as conference champion; x – Division champion/co-champions; Rankings from AP Poll

2007 Atlantic Coast Conference football standings
| | Conf. | | | Overall |
| Team | W | | L | W | | L |
|---|---|---|---|---|---|---|
Atlantic Division
| No. 10 Boston College x | 6 | – | 2 | 11 | – | 3 |
| No. 21 Clemson | 5 | – | 3 | 9 | – | 4 |
| Wake Forest | 5 | – | 3 | 9 | – | 4 |
| Florida State | 4 | – | 4 | 7 | – | 6 |
| Maryland | 3 | – | 5 | 6 | – | 7 |
| NC State | 3 | – | 5 | 5 | – | 7 |
Coastal Division
| No. 9 Virginia Tech x$ | 7 | – | 1 | 11 | – | 3 |
| Virginia | 6 | – | 2 | 9 | – | 4 |
| Georgia Tech | 4 | – | 4 | 7 | – | 6 |
| North Carolina | 3 | – | 5 | 4 | – | 8 |
| Miami (FL) | 2 | – | 6 | 5 | – | 7 |
| Duke | 0 | – | 8 | 1 | – | 11 |
Championship: Virginia Tech 30, Boston College 16
$ – BCS representative as conference champion; % – BCS at-large representative; x – Division champion/co-champions; Rankings from AP Poll

2008 Atlantic Coast Conference football standings
| | Conf. | | | Overall |
| Team | W | | L | W | | L |
|---|---|---|---|---|---|---|
Atlantic Division
| Boston College xy | 5 | – | 3 | 9 | – | 5 |
| No. 21 Florida State x | 5 | – | 3 | 9 | – | 4 |
| Maryland | 4 | – | 4 | 8 | – | 5 |
| Wake Forest | 4 | – | 4 | 8 | – | 5 |
| Clemson | 4 | – | 4 | 7 | – | 6 |
| NC State | 4 | – | 4 | 6 | – | 7 |
Coastal Division
| No. 15 Virginia Tech xy$ | 5 | – | 3 | 10 | – | 4 |
| No. 22 Georgia Tech x | 5 | – | 3 | 9 | – | 4 |
| North Carolina | 0 | – | 4 | 0 | – | 5 |
| Miami (FL) | 4 | – | 4 | 7 | – | 6 |
| Virginia | 3 | – | 5 | 5 | – | 7 |
| Duke | 1 | – | 7 | 4 | – | 8 |
Championship: Virginia Tech 30, Boston College 12
$ – BCS representative as conference champion; x – Division champion/co-champions; y – Championship game participant; North Carolina vacated 8 wins, including 4 ACC wins; Rankings from AP Poll

2009 Atlantic Coast Conference football standings
| | Conf. | | | Overall |
| Team | W | | L | W | | L |
|---|---|---|---|---|---|---|
Atlantic Division
| No. 24 Clemson x | 6 | – | 2 | 9 | – | 5 |
| Boston College | 5 | – | 3 | 8 | – | 5 |
| Florida State | 4 | – | 4 | 7 | – | 6 |
| Wake Forest | 3 | – | 5 | 5 | – | 7 |
| NC State | 2 | – | 6 | 5 | – | 7 |
| Maryland | 1 | – | 7 | 2 | – | 10 |
Coastal Division
| No. 13 Georgia Tech * x$ | 7 | – | 1 | 11 | – | 3 |
| No. 10 Virginia Tech | 6 | – | 2 | 10 | – | 3 |
| No. 19 Miami (FL) | 5 | – | 3 | 9 | – | 4 |
| North Carolina * | 0 | – | 4 | 0 | – | 5 |
| Duke | 3 | – | 5 | 5 | – | 7 |
| Virginia | 2 | – | 6 | 3 | – | 9 |
Championship: Georgia Tech 39, Clemson 34
$ – BCS representative as conference champion; North Carolina vacated 8 wins, including 4 ACC wins.; Rankings from AP Poll

2010 Atlantic Coast Conference football standings
| | Conf. | | | Overall |
| Team | W | | L | W | | L |
|---|---|---|---|---|---|---|
Atlantic Division
| No. 17 Florida State x | 6 | – | 2 | 10 | – | 4 |
| No. 23 Maryland | 5 | – | 3 | 9 | – | 4 |
| No. 25 NC State | 5 | – | 3 | 9 | – | 4 |
| Boston College | 4 | – | 4 | 7 | – | 6 |
| Clemson | 4 | – | 4 | 6 | – | 7 |
| Wake Forest | 1 | – | 7 | 3 | – | 9 |
Coastal Division
| No. 16 Virginia Tech x$ | 8 | – | 0 | 11 | – | 3 |
| Miami (FL) | 5 | – | 3 | 7 | – | 6 |
| Georgia Tech | 4 | – | 4 | 6 | – | 7 |
| North Carolina | 4 | – | 4 | 8 | – | 5 |
| Duke | 1 | – | 7 | 3 | – | 9 |
| Virginia | 1 | – | 7 | 4 | – | 8 |
Championship: Virginia Tech 44, Florida State 33
$ – BCS representative as conference champion; x – Division champion/co-champions; Rankings from AP Poll

2011 Atlantic Coast Conference football standings
| | Conf. | | | Overall |
| Team | W | | L | W | | L |
|---|---|---|---|---|---|---|
Atlantic Division
| No. 22 Clemson x$ | 6 | – | 2 | 10 | – | 4 |
| Wake Forest | 5 | – | 3 | 6 | – | 7 |
| No. 23 Florida State | 5 | – | 3 | 9 | – | 4 |
| NC State | 4 | – | 4 | 8 | – | 5 |
| Boston College | 3 | – | 5 | 4 | – | 8 |
| Maryland | 1 | – | 7 | 2 | – | 10 |
Coastal Division
| No. 21 Virginia Tech x% | 7 | – | 1 | 11 | – | 3 |
| Virginia | 5 | – | 3 | 8 | – | 5 |
| Georgia Tech | 5 | – | 3 | 8 | – | 5 |
| Miami (FL) | 3 | – | 5 | 6 | – | 6 |
| North Carolina | 3 | – | 5 | 7 | – | 6 |
| Duke | 1 | – | 7 | 3 | – | 9 |
Championship: Clemson 38, Virginia Tech 10
$ – BCS representative as conference champion; % – BCS at-large representative; x – Division champion/co-champions; Rankings from AP Poll

2012 Atlantic Coast Conference football standings
| | Conf. | | | Overall |
| Team | W | | L | W | | L |
|---|---|---|---|---|---|---|
Atlantic Division
| No. 10 Florida State xy$ | 7 | – | 1 | 12 | – | 2 |
| No. 11 Clemson x | 7 | – | 1 | 11 | – | 2 |
| NC State | 4 | – | 4 | 7 | – | 6 |
| Wake Forest | 3 | – | 5 | 5 | – | 7 |
| Maryland | 2 | – | 6 | 4 | – | 8 |
| Boston College | 1 | – | 7 | 2 | – | 10 |
Coastal Division
| Georgia Tech xy | 5 | – | 3 | 7 | – | 7 |
| North Carolina† | 5 | – | 3 | 8 | – | 4 |
| Miami (FL)‡ | 5 | – | 3 | 7 | – | 5 |
| Virginia Tech | 4 | – | 4 | 7 | – | 6 |
| Duke | 3 | – | 5 | 6 | – | 7 |
| Virginia | 2 | – | 6 | 4 | – | 8 |
Championship: Florida State 21, Georgia Tech 15
$ – BCS representative as conference champion; x – Division champion/co-champions; y – Championship game participant; † North Carolina ineligible for ACC title, championship game, and bowl game due to NCAA sanctions. ‡ Miami ineligible for ACC title, championship game, and bowl game due to self-imposed sanctions.; Rankings from AP Poll

2013 Atlantic Coast Conference football standings
| | Conf. | | | Overall |
| Team | W | | L | W | | L |
|---|---|---|---|---|---|---|
Atlantic Division
| No. 1 Florida State x$# | 8 | – | 0 | 14 | – | 0 |
| No. 8 Clemson % | 7 | – | 1 | 11 | – | 2 |
| Boston College | 4 | – | 4 | 7 | – | 6 |
| Syracuse | 4 | – | 4 | 7 | – | 6 |
| Maryland | 3 | – | 5 | 7 | – | 6 |
| Wake Forest | 2 | – | 6 | 4 | – | 8 |
| NC State | 0 | – | 8 | 3 | – | 9 |
Coastal Division
| No. 23 Duke x | 6 | – | 2 | 10 | – | 4 |
| Miami (FL) | 5 | – | 3 | 9 | – | 4 |
| Virginia Tech | 5 | – | 3 | 8 | – | 5 |
| Georgia Tech | 5 | – | 3 | 7 | – | 6 |
| North Carolina | 4 | – | 4 | 7 | – | 6 |
| Pittsburgh | 3 | – | 5 | 7 | – | 6 |
| Virginia | 0 | – | 8 | 2 | – | 10 |
Championship: Florida State 45, Duke 7
# – BCS National Champion; $ – BCS representative as conference champion; % – BCS at-large representative; x – Division champion/co-champions; Rankings from AP Poll

2014 Atlantic Coast Conference football standings
| | Conf. | | | Overall |
| Team | W | | L | W | | L |
|---|---|---|---|---|---|---|
Atlantic Division
| No. T–5 Florida State x$^ | 8 | – | 0 | 13 | – | 1 |
| No. 15 Clemson | 6 | – | 2 | 10 | – | 3 |
| No. 24 Louisville | 5 | – | 3 | 9 | – | 4 |
| Boston College | 4 | – | 4 | 7 | – | 6 |
| NC State | 3 | – | 5 | 8 | – | 5 |
| Syracuse | 1 | – | 7 | 3 | – | 9 |
| Wake Forest | 1 | – | 7 | 3 | – | 9 |
Coastal Division
| No. 8 Georgia Tech x | 6 | – | 2 | 11 | – | 3 |
| Duke | 5 | – | 3 | 9 | – | 4 |
| North Carolina | 4 | – | 4 | 6 | – | 7 |
| Pittsburgh | 4 | – | 4 | 6 | – | 7 |
| Miami (FL) | 3 | – | 5 | 6 | – | 7 |
| Virginia Tech | 3 | – | 5 | 7 | – | 6 |
| Virginia | 3 | – | 5 | 5 | – | 7 |
Championship: Florida State 37, Georgia Tech 35
^ – College Football Playoff participant; $ – Conference champion; x – Division champion/co-champions; Rankings from AP Poll

2015 Atlantic Coast Conference football standings
| | Conf. | | | Overall |
| Team | W | | L | W | | L |
|---|---|---|---|---|---|---|
Atlantic Division
| No. 2 Clemson x$^ | 8 | – | 0 | 14 | – | 1 |
| No. 14 Florida State | 6 | – | 2 | 10 | – | 3 |
| Louisville | 5 | – | 3 | 8 | – | 5 |
| NC State | 3 | – | 5 | 7 | – | 6 |
| Syracuse | 2 | – | 6 | 4 | – | 8 |
| Wake Forest | 1 | – | 7 | 3 | – | 9 |
| Boston College | 0 | – | 8 | 3 | – | 9 |
Coastal Division
| No. 15 North Carolina x | 8 | – | 0 | 11 | – | 3 |
| Pittsburgh | 6 | – | 2 | 8 | – | 5 |
| Miami (FL) | 5 | – | 3 | 8 | – | 5 |
| Duke | 4 | – | 4 | 8 | – | 5 |
| Virginia Tech | 4 | – | 4 | 7 | – | 6 |
| Virginia | 3 | – | 5 | 4 | – | 8 |
| Georgia Tech | 1 | – | 7 | 3 | – | 9 |
Championship: Clemson 45, North Carolina 37
^ – College Football Playoff participant; $ – Conference champion; x – Division champion/co-champions; Rankings from AP Poll

2016 Atlantic Coast Conference football standings
| | Conf. | | | Overall |
| Team | W | | L | W | | L |
|---|---|---|---|---|---|---|
Atlantic Division
| No. 1 Clemson xy$# | 7 | – | 1 | 14 | – | 1 |
| No. 21 Louisville x | 7 | – | 1 | 9 | – | 4 |
| No. 8 Florida State | 5 | – | 3 | 10 | – | 3 |
| NC State | 3 | – | 5 | 7 | – | 6 |
| Wake Forest | 3 | – | 5 | 7 | – | 6 |
| Boston College | 2 | – | 6 | 7 | – | 6 |
| Syracuse | 2 | – | 6 | 4 | – | 8 |
Coastal Division
| No. 16 Virginia Tech xy | 6 | – | 2 | 10 | – | 4 |
| North Carolina | 5 | – | 3 | 8 | – | 5 |
| No. 20 Miami (FL) | 5 | – | 3 | 9 | – | 4 |
| Pittsburgh | 5 | – | 3 | 8 | – | 5 |
| Georgia Tech | 4 | – | 4 | 9 | – | 4 |
| Duke | 1 | – | 7 | 4 | – | 8 |
| Virginia | 1 | – | 7 | 2 | – | 10 |
Championship: Clemson 42, Virginia Tech 35
# – College Football Playoff champion; $ – Conference champion; x – Division champion/co-champions; y – Championship game participant; Rankings from AP Poll

2017 Atlantic Coast Conference football standings
| | Conf. | | | Overall |
| Team | W | | L | W | | L |
|---|---|---|---|---|---|---|
Atlantic Division
| No. 4 Clemson xy$^ | 7 | – | 1 | 12 | – | 2 |
| No. 23 NC State | 6 | – | 2 | 9 | – | 4 |
| Boston College | 4 | – | 4 | 7 | – | 6 |
| Louisville | 4 | – | 4 | 8 | – | 5 |
| Wake Forest | 4 | – | 4 | 8 | – | 5 |
| Florida State | 3 | – | 5 | 7 | – | 6 |
| Syracuse | 2 | – | 6 | 4 | – | 8 |
Coastal Division
| No. 13 Miami (FL) xy | 7 | – | 1 | 10 | – | 3 |
| No. 24 Virginia Tech | 5 | – | 3 | 9 | – | 4 |
| Georgia Tech | 4 | – | 4 | 5 | – | 6 |
| Duke | 3 | – | 5 | 7 | – | 6 |
| Pittsburgh | 3 | – | 5 | 5 | – | 7 |
| Virginia | 3 | – | 5 | 6 | – | 7 |
| North Carolina | 1 | – | 7 | 3 | – | 9 |
Championship: Clemson 38, Miami 3
^ – College Football Playoff participant; $ – Conference champion; x – Division champion/co-champions; y – Championship game participant; Rankings from AP Poll

2018 Atlantic Coast Conference football standings
| | Conf. | | | Overall |
| Team | W | | L | W | | L |
|---|---|---|---|---|---|---|
Atlantic Division
| No. 1 Clemson x$#^ | 8 | – | 0 | 15 | – | 0 |
| No. 15 Syracuse | 6 | – | 2 | 10 | – | 3 |
| NC State | 5 | – | 3 | 9 | – | 4 |
| Boston College | 4 | – | 4 | 7 | – | 5 |
| Wake Forest | 3 | – | 5 | 7 | – | 6 |
| Florida State | 3 | – | 5 | 5 | – | 7 |
| Louisville | 0 | – | 8 | 2 | – | 10 |
Coastal Division
| Pittsburgh x | 6 | – | 2 | 7 | – | 7 |
| Georgia Tech | 5 | – | 3 | 7 | – | 6 |
| Miami (FL) | 4 | – | 4 | 7 | – | 6 |
| Virginia | 4 | – | 4 | 8 | – | 5 |
| Virginia Tech | 4 | – | 4 | 6 | – | 7 |
| Duke | 3 | – | 5 | 8 | – | 5 |
| North Carolina | 1 | – | 7 | 2 | – | 9 |
Championship: Clemson 42, Pittsburgh 10
# – College Football Playoff champion; ^ – College Football Playoff participant; $ – Conference champion; x – Division champion/co-champions; Rankings from AP Poll

2019 Atlantic Coast Conference football standings
| | Conf. | | | Overall |
| Team | W | | L | W | | L |
|---|---|---|---|---|---|---|
Atlantic Division
| No. 2 Clemson xy$^ | 8 | – | 0 | 14 | – | 1 |
| Louisville | 5 | – | 3 | 8 | – | 5 |
| Wake Forest | 4 | – | 4 | 8 | – | 5 |
| Florida State | 4 | – | 4 | 6 | – | 7 |
| Boston College | 4 | – | 4 | 6 | – | 7 |
| Syracuse | 2 | – | 6 | 5 | – | 7 |
| NC State | 1 | – | 7 | 4 | – | 8 |
Coastal Division
| Virginia x | 6 | – | 2 | 9 | – | 5 |
| Virginia Tech | 5 | – | 3 | 8 | – | 5 |
| Miami (FL) | 4 | – | 4 | 6 | – | 7 |
| Pittsburgh | 4 | – | 4 | 8 | – | 5 |
| North Carolina | 4 | – | 4 | 7 | – | 6 |
| Duke | 3 | – | 5 | 5 | – | 7 |
| Georgia Tech | 2 | – | 6 | 3 | – | 9 |
Championship: Clemson 62, Virginia 17
^ – College Football Playoff participant; $ – Conference champion; x – Division champion/co-champions; Rankings from AP Poll

2020 Atlantic Coast Conference football standings
| | Conf. | | | Overall |
| Team | W | | L | W | | L |
|---|---|---|---|---|---|---|
| No. 5 Notre Dame y^ | 9 | – | 0 | 10 | – | 2 |
| No. 3 Clemson y$^ | 8 | – | 1 | 10 | – | 2 |
| No. 22 Miami (FL) | 7 | – | 2 | 8 | – | 3 |
| No. 18 North Carolina | 7 | – | 3 | 8 | – | 4 |
| NC State | 7 | – | 3 | 8 | – | 4 |
| Boston College | 5 | – | 5 | 6 | – | 5 |
| Pittsburgh | 5 | – | 5 | 6 | – | 5 |
| Virginia Tech | 5 | – | 5 | 5 | – | 6 |
| Virginia | 4 | – | 5 | 5 | – | 5 |
| Wake Forest | 3 | – | 4 | 4 | – | 5 |
| Georgia Tech | 3 | – | 6 | 3 | – | 7 |
| Louisville | 3 | – | 7 | 4 | – | 7 |
| Florida State | 2 | – | 6 | 3 | – | 6 |
| Duke | 1 | – | 9 | 2 | – | 9 |
| Syracuse | 1 | – | 9 | 1 | – | 10 |
Championship: Clemson 34, Notre Dame 10
^ – College Football Playoff participant; $ – Conference champion; y – Championship game participant; Rankings from AP Poll.

2021 Atlantic Coast Conference football standings
| | Conf. | | | Overall |
| Team | W | | L | W | | L |
|---|---|---|---|---|---|---|
Atlantic Division
| No. 15 Wake Forest xy | 7 | – | 1 | 11 | – | 3 |
| No. 20 NC State | 6 | – | 2 | 9 | – | 3 |
| No. 14 Clemson | 6 | – | 2 | 10 | – | 3 |
| Louisville | 4 | – | 4 | 6 | – | 7 |
| Florida State | 4 | – | 4 | 5 | – | 7 |
| Syracuse | 2 | – | 6 | 5 | – | 7 |
| Boston College | 2 | – | 6 | 6 | – | 6 |
Coastal Division
| No. 13 Pittsburgh xy$ | 7 | – | 1 | 11 | – | 3 |
| Miami (FL) | 5 | – | 3 | 7 | – | 5 |
| Virginia | 4 | – | 4 | 6 | – | 6 |
| Virginia Tech | 4 | – | 4 | 6 | – | 7 |
| North Carolina | 3 | – | 5 | 6 | – | 7 |
| Georgia Tech | 2 | – | 6 | 3 | – | 9 |
| Duke | 0 | – | 8 | 3 | – | 9 |
Championship: Pittsburgh 45, Wake Forest 21
$ – Conference champion; x – Division champion/co-champions; y – Championship game participant; Rankings from AP Poll

2022 Atlantic Coast Conference football standings
| | Conf. | | | Overall |
| Team | W | | L | W | | L |
|---|---|---|---|---|---|---|
Atlantic Division
| No. 13 Clemson xy$ | 8 | – | 0 | 11 | – | 3 |
| No. 11 Florida State | 5 | – | 3 | 10 | – | 3 |
| Syracuse | 4 | – | 4 | 7 | – | 6 |
| Louisville | 4 | – | 4 | 8 | – | 5 |
| NC State | 4 | – | 4 | 8 | – | 5 |
| Wake Forest | 3 | – | 5 | 8 | – | 5 |
| Boston College | 2 | – | 6 | 3 | – | 9 |
Coastal Division
| North Carolina xy | 6 | – | 2 | 9 | – | 5 |
| No. 22 Pittsburgh | 5 | – | 3 | 9 | – | 4 |
| Duke | 5 | – | 3 | 9 | – | 4 |
| Georgia Tech | 4 | – | 4 | 5 | – | 7 |
| Miami (FL) | 3 | – | 5 | 5 | – | 7 |
| Virginia | 1 | – | 6 | 3 | – | 7 |
| Virginia Tech | 1 | – | 6 | 3 | – | 8 |
Championship: Clemson 39, North Carolina 10
$ – Conference champion; x – Division champion/co-champions; y – Championship game participant; Rankings from AP Poll

2023 Atlantic Coast Conference football standings
| | Conf. | | | Overall |
| Team | W | | L | W | | L |
|---|---|---|---|---|---|---|
| No. 6 Florida State y$ | 8 | – | 0 | 13 | – | 1 |
| No. 19 Louisville y | 7 | – | 1 | 10 | – | 4 |
| No. 21 NC State | 6 | – | 2 | 9 | – | 4 |
| Georgia Tech | 5 | – | 3 | 7 | – | 6 |
| Virginia Tech | 5 | – | 3 | 7 | – | 6 |
| North Carolina | 4 | – | 4 | 8 | – | 5 |
| No. 20 Clemson | 4 | – | 4 | 9 | – | 4 |
| Duke | 4 | – | 4 | 8 | – | 5 |
| Miami (FL) | 3 | – | 5 | 7 | – | 6 |
| Boston College | 3 | – | 5 | 7 | – | 6 |
| Syracuse | 2 | – | 6 | 6 | – | 7 |
| Virginia | 2 | – | 6 | 3 | – | 9 |
| Pittsburgh | 2 | – | 6 | 3 | – | 9 |
| Wake Forest | 1 | – | 7 | 4 | – | 8 |
Championship: Florida State 16, Louisville 6
$ – Conference champion; y – Championship game participant; Rankings from AP Poll

2024 Atlantic Coast Conference football standings
| | Conf. | | | Overall |
| Team | W | | L | W | | L |
|---|---|---|---|---|---|---|
| No. 12 SMU y^ | 8 | – | 0 | 11 | – | 3 |
| No. 14 Clemson y$^ | 7 | – | 1 | 10 | – | 4 |
| No. 18 Miami (FL) | 6 | – | 2 | 10 | – | 3 |
| No. 20 Syracuse | 5 | – | 3 | 10 | – | 3 |
| Louisville | 5 | – | 3 | 9 | – | 4 |
| Georgia Tech | 5 | – | 3 | 7 | – | 6 |
| Duke | 5 | – | 3 | 9 | – | 4 |
| Virginia Tech | 4 | – | 4 | 6 | – | 7 |
| Boston College | 4 | – | 4 | 7 | – | 6 |
| Pittsburgh | 3 | – | 5 | 7 | – | 6 |
| NC State | 3 | – | 5 | 6 | – | 7 |
| North Carolina | 3 | – | 5 | 6 | – | 7 |
| Virginia | 3 | – | 5 | 5 | – | 7 |
| California | 2 | – | 6 | 6 | – | 7 |
| Wake Forest | 2 | – | 6 | 4 | – | 8 |
| Stanford | 2 | – | 6 | 3 | – | 9 |
| Florida State | 1 | – | 7 | 2 | – | 10 |
Championship: Clemson 34, SMU 31
^ – College Football Playoff participant; $ – Conference champion; y – Championship game participant; Rankings from AP Poll

2025 Atlantic Coast Conference football standings
| | Conf. | | | Overall |
| Team | W | | L | W | | L |
|---|---|---|---|---|---|---|
| Boston College | 0 | – | 0 | 0 | – | 0 |
| California | 0 | – | 0 | 0 | – | 0 |
| Clemson | 0 | – | 0 | 0 | – | 0 |
| Duke | 0 | – | 0 | 0 | – | 0 |
| Florida State | 0 | – | 0 | 0 | – | 0 |
| Georgia Tech | 0 | – | 0 | 0 | – | 0 |
| Louisville | 0 | – | 0 | 0 | – | 0 |
| Miami (FL) | 0 | – | 0 | 0 | – | 0 |
| North Carolina | 0 | – | 0 | 0 | – | 0 |
| NC State | 0 | – | 0 | 0 | – | 0 |
| Pittsburgh | 0 | – | 0 | 0 | – | 0 |
| SMU | 0 | – | 0 | 0 | – | 0 |
| Stanford | 0 | – | 0 | 0 | – | 0 |
| Syracuse | 0 | – | 0 | 0 | – | 0 |
| Virginia | 0 | – | 0 | 0 | – | 0 |
| Virginia Tech | 0 | – | 0 | 0 | – | 0 |
| Wake Forest | 0 | – | 0 | 0 | – | 0 |
Championship: December 6, 2025
As of April 9, 2025; Rankings from AP Poll
