= Bill Hildebrand =

American gridiron football player and coach (1924–1992)

Biographical details
- Born: August 26, 1924
- Died: May 3, 1992 (aged 67)

Playing career
- 1944–1946: Mississippi State
- Position: End

Coaching career (HC unless noted)
- 1947–1948: Mississippi State (ends)
- 1949: Purdue (assistant)
- 1950: Tennessee (assistant freshmen)
- 1951: Whitworth
- 1952–1953: Mississippi State (freshmen)
- 1954–1955: Minnesota (line)
- 1956–1959: Wake Forest (line)
- 1960–1963: Wake Forest
- 1966: BC Lions (assistant)
- 1967–1968: Mississippi State (DC)

Head coaching record
- Overall: 10–38

Accomplishments and honors

Awards
- First-team All-SEC (1945); Second-team All-SEC (1946)

Charles William Hildebrand (August 26, 1924 – May 3, 1992) was an American gridiron football player and coach. He served as the head football coach at Whitworth College—now known as Whitworth University—in 1951 and at Wake Forest University from 1960 to 1963, compiling a career college football head coaching record of 10–38.

== Head coaching record ==
| Year | Team | Overall | Conference | Standing | Bowl/playoffs |
|---|---|---|---|---|---|
Whitworth Pirates (Evergreen Conference) (1951)
| 1951 | Whitworth | 3–5 | 1–4 | T–3rd | |
| Whitworth: | | 3–5 | 1–4 | | |
Wake Forest Demon Deacons (Atlantic Coast Conference) (1960–1963)
| 1960 | Wake Forest | 2–8 | 2–5 | T–6th | |
| 1961 | Wake Forest | 4–6 | 3–4 | T–5th | |
| 1962 | Wake Forest | 0–10 | 0–7 | 8th | |
| 1963 | Wake Forest | 1–9 | 1–5 | 7th | |
| Wake Forest: | | 7–33 | 6–21 | | |
| Total: | | 10–38 | | | |
