= 1962 Maryland Terrapins football team =

American college football season

1962 Maryland Terrapins football
- Conference: Atlantic Coast Conference
- Record: 6–4 (5–2 ACC)
- Head coach: Tom Nugent (4th season)
- Home stadium: Byrd Stadium

1962 Atlantic Coast Conference football standings
	Conf.					Overall
Team	W		L		T	W		L		T
Duke $	6	–	0	–	0	8	–	2	–	0
Clemson	5	–	1	–	0	6	–	4	–	0
Maryland	5	–	2	–	0	6	–	4	–	0
South Carolina	3	–	4	–	0	4	–	5	–	1
NC State	3	–	4	–	0	3	–	6	–	1
North Carolina	3	–	4	–	0	3	–	7	–	0
Virginia	1	–	4	–	0	5	–	5	–	0
Wake Forest	0	–	7	–	0	0	–	10	–	0
$ – Conference champion

The 1962 Maryland Terrapins football team represented the University of Maryland in the 1962 NCAA University Division football season. In their fourth season under head coach Tom Nugent, the Terrapins compiled a 6–4 record (5–2 in conference), finished in third place in the Atlantic Coast Conference, and outscored their opponents 170 to 128. The team's statistical leaders included Dick Shiner with 1,324 passing yards, Len Chiaverini with 602 rushing yards, and Tom Brown with 557 receiving yards.

== Schedule ==
Date	Opponent	Site	Result	Attendance	Source
September 22	SMU*	Byrd Stadium; College Park, MD	W 7–0	33,000	
September 29	at Wake Forest	Bowman Gray Stadium; Winston-Salem, NC	W 13–2	12,000	
October 6	at NC State	Riddick Stadium; Raleigh, NC	W 14–6	13,000	
October 13	at North Carolina	Kenan Memorial Stadium; Chapel Hill, NC	W 31–13	26,000	
October 19	at Miami (FL)*	Miami Orange Bowl; Miami, FL	L 24–28	49,381	
October 27	South Carolina	Byrd Stadium; College Park, MD	W 13–11	32,000	
November 3	at Penn State*	Beaver Stadium; University Park, PA (rivalry)	L 7–23	41,384	
November 10	at Duke	Duke Stadium; Durham, NC	L 7–10	26,000	
November 17	Clemson	Byrd Stadium; College Park, MD	L 14–17	23,000	
November 24	Virginia	Byrd Stadium; College Park, MD (rivalry)	W 40–18	17,000	
*Non-conference game
