= 1962 South Carolina Gamecocks football team =

American college football season

1962 South Carolina Gamecocks football
- Conference: Atlantic Coast Conference
- Record: 4–5–1 (3–4 ACC)
- Head coach: Marvin Bass (2nd season)
- Captains: John Caskey; Dick Day; Richard Lomas
- Home stadium: Carolina Stadium

1962 Atlantic Coast Conference football standings
	Conf.					Overall
Team	W		L		T	W		L		T
Duke $	6	–	0	–	0	8	–	2	–	0
Clemson	5	–	1	–	0	6	–	4	–	0
Maryland	5	–	2	–	0	6	–	4	–	0
South Carolina	3	–	4	–	0	4	–	5	–	1
NC State	3	–	4	–	0	3	–	6	–	1
North Carolina	3	–	4	–	0	3	–	7	–	0
Virginia	1	–	4	–	0	5	–	5	–	0
Wake Forest	0	–	7	–	0	0	–	10	–	0
$ – Conference champion

The 1962 South Carolina Gamecocks football team represented the University of South Carolina as a member of the Atlantic Coast Conference (ACC) during the 1962 NCAA University Division football season. Led by second-year head coach Marvin Bass, the Gamecocks compiled an overall record of 4–5–1 with a mark of 3–4 in conference play, placing in a three-way tie for fourth in the ACC. The team played home games at Carolina Stadium in Columbia, South Carolina.

== Schedule ==
Date	Opponent	Site	Result	Attendance	Source
September 22	at Northwestern*	Dyche Stadium; Evanston, IL	L 20–37	35,767	
September 29	at Duke	Duke Stadium; Durham, NC	L 8–21	24,500	
October 6	Georgia*	Carolina Stadium; Columbia, SC (rivalry)	T 7–7	28,000	
October 13	Wake Forest	Carolina Stadium; Columbia, SC	W 27–6	18,942	
October 20	at North Carolina	Kenan Memorial Stadium; Chapel Hill, NC (rivalry)	L 14–19	25,000	
October 27	at Maryland	Byrd Stadium; College Park, MD	L 11–13	32,000	
November 3	Virginia	Carolina Stadium; Columbia, SC	W 40–6	17,033	
November 10	NC State	Carolina Stadium; Columbia, SC	W 17–6	19,938	
November 17	at Detroit*	University of Detroit Stadium; Detroit, MI	W 26–13		
November 24	at Clemson	Memorial Stadium; Clemson, SC (rivalry)	L 17–20	45,000	
*Non-conference game
