= 1965 Maryland Terrapins football team =

American college football season

1965 Maryland Terrapins football
- Conference: Atlantic Coast Conference
- Record: 4–6 (3–3 ACC)
- Head coach: Tom Nugent (7th season)
- Home stadium: Byrd Stadium

1965 Atlantic Coast Conference football standings
	Conf.					Overall
Team	W		L		T	W		L		T
NC State +	5	–	2	–	0	6	–	4	–	0†
Clemson +	5	–	2	–	0	5	–	5	–	0†
Duke	4	–	2	–	0	6	–	4	–	0
Maryland	3	–	3	–	0	4	–	6	–	0
North Carolina	3	–	3	–	0	4	–	6	–	0
Virginia	3	–	3	–	0	4	–	6	–	0†
Wake Forest	2	–	4	–	0	3	–	7	–	0†
South Carolina	0	–	6	–	0	5	–	5	–	0†
+ – Conference co-champions; † South Carolina forfeited its 4 conference wins (Clemson, NC State, Virginia, Wake Forest) due to use of ineligible players. This improved Clemson and NC State from 4–3 to 5–2, making them co-champions. Overall records did not change due to the forfeits. Duke and South Carolina were originally co-champions with records of 4–2.

The 1965 Maryland Terrapins football team represented the University of Maryland in the 1965 NCAA University Division football season. In their seventh and final season under head coach Tom Nugent, the Terrapins compiled a 4–6 record (3–3 in conference), finished in a tie for fourth place in the Atlantic Coast Conference, and were outscored by their opponents 164 to 132. The team's statistical leaders included Phil Petry with 763 passing yards, Ernie Torain with 370 rushing yards, and Bobby Collins with 462 receiving yards.

== Schedule ==
Date	Opponent	Site	Result	Attendance	Source
September 25	Ohio*	Byrd Stadium; College Park, MD	W 24–7	28,000	
October 2	Syracuse*	Byrd Stadium; College Park, MD	L 7–24	35,000	
October 9	at Wake Forest	Bowman Gray Stadium; Winston-Salem, NC	W 10–7	18,000	
October 16	at North Carolina	Kenan Memorial Stadium; Chapel Hill, NC	L 10–12	30,000	
October 23	NC State	Byrd Stadium; College Park, MD	L 7–29	30,000	
October 30	at South Carolina	Carolina Stadium; Columbia, SC	W 27–14	30,000	
November 6	at Navy*	Navy–Marine Corps Memorial Stadium; Annapolis, MD (rivalry)	L 7–19	28,135	
November 13	at Clemson	Memorial Stadium; Clemson, SC	W 6–0	26,000	
November 20	Virginia	Byrd Stadium; College Park, MD (rivalry)	L 27–33	21,000	
December 4	Penn State*	Byrd Stadium; College Park, MD (rivalry)	L 7–19	24,000	
*Non-conference game
