= 1965 Virginia Cavaliers football team =

American college football season

1965 Virginia Cavaliers football
- Conference: Atlantic Coast Conference
- Record: 4–6 (2–4 ACC)
- Head coach: George Blackburn (1st season)
- Captains: Bob Kowalkowski; John Pincavage
- Home stadium: Scott Stadium

1965 Atlantic Coast Conference football standings
	Conf.					Overall
Team	W		L		T	W		L		T
NC State +	5	–	2	–	0	6	–	4	–	0†
Clemson +	5	–	2	–	0	5	–	5	–	0†
Duke	4	–	2	–	0	6	–	4	–	0
Maryland	3	–	3	–	0	4	–	6	–	0
North Carolina	3	–	3	–	0	4	–	6	–	0
Virginia	3	–	3	–	0	4	–	6	–	0†
Wake Forest	2	–	4	–	0	3	–	7	–	0†
South Carolina	0	–	6	–	0	5	–	5	–	0†
+ – Conference co-champions; † South Carolina forfeited its 4 conference wins (Clemson, NC State, Virginia, Wake Forest) due to use of ineligible players. This improved Clemson and NC State from 4–3 to 5–2, making them co-champions. Overall records did not change due to the forfeits. Duke and South Carolina were originally co-champions with records of 4–2.

The 1965 Virginia Cavaliers football team represented the University of Virginia during the 1965 NCAA University Division football season. The Cavaliers were led by first-year head coach George Blackburn and played their home games at Scott Stadium in Charlottesville, Virginia. They competed as members of the Atlantic Coast Conference, originally finishing in seventh, however forfeited wins by South Carolina moved Virginia up to a tie for fourth.

== Schedule ==
Date	Opponent	Site	Result	Attendance	Source
September 18	Duke	Scott Stadium; Charlottesville, VA	L 7–21	27,800	
September 25	Clemson	Scott Stadium; Charlottesville, VA	L 14–20	15,000	
October 2	at North Carolina	Kenan Memorial Stadium; Chapel Hill, NC (South's Oldest Rivalry)	W 21–17	38,000	
October 9	VMI*	Scott Stadium; Charlottesville, VA	W 14–10	21,000	
October 16	vs. West Virginia*	City Stadium; Richmond, VA (Tobacco Bowl)	W 41–0	24,000	
October 23	at Virginia Tech*	Lane Stadium; Blacksburg, VA (rivalry)	L 14–22	30,100	
October 30	NC State^{†}	Scott Stadium; Charlottesville, VA	L 0–13	25,000	
November 6	South Carolina	Scott Stadium; Charlottesville, VA	W 7–17 (forfeit win)	18,000	
November 13	at Georgia Tech*	Grant Field; Atlanta, GA	L 19–42	40,094	
November 20	at Maryland	Byrd Stadium; College Park, MD (rivalry)	W 33–27	21,000	
*Non-conference game; ^{†}Homecoming
