= 1965 Clemson Tigers football team =

American college football season

1965 Clemson Tigers football

ACC co-champion
- Conference: Atlantic Coast Conference
- Record: 5–5 (5–2^{[a]} ACC)
- Head coach: Frank Howard (26th season)
- Captains: Bill Hecht; Floyd Rogers
- Home stadium: Memorial Stadium

1965 Atlantic Coast Conference football standings
	Conf.					Overall
Team	W		L		T	W		L		T
NC State +	5	–	2	–	0	6	–	4	–	0†
Clemson +	5	–	2	–	0	5	–	5	–	0†
Duke	4	–	2	–	0	6	–	4	–	0
Maryland	3	–	3	–	0	4	–	6	–	0
North Carolina	3	–	3	–	0	4	–	6	–	0
Virginia	3	–	3	–	0	4	–	6	–	0†
Wake Forest	2	–	4	–	0	3	–	7	–	0†
South Carolina	0	–	6	–	0	5	–	5	–	0†
+ – Conference co-champions; † South Carolina forfeited its 4 conference wins (Clemson, NC State, Virginia, Wake Forest) due to use of ineligible players. This improved Clemson and NC State from 4–3 to 5–2, making them co-champions. Overall records did not change due to the forfeits. Duke and South Carolina were originally co-champions with records of 4–2.

The 1965 Clemson Tigers football team was an American football team that represented Clemson University in the Atlantic Coast Conference (ACC) during the 1965 NCAA University Division football season. In its 26th season under head coach Frank Howard, the team compiled a 5–5 record (5–2 against conference opponents), tied for the ACC championship, and was outscored by a total of 137 to 117. The team played its home games at Memorial Stadium in Clemson, South Carolina.

Bill Hecht and Floyd Rogers were the team captains. The team's statistical leaders included Thomas Ray with 1,019 passing yards, Hugh Mauldin with 664 rushing yards and 24 points scored (4 touchdowns), and Phil Rogers with 466 receiving yards.

Four Clemson players were selected by the Associated Press (AP) or the United Press International (UPI) as first-team players on the 1965 All-Atlantic Coast Conference football team: back Hugh Mauldin (AP-1, UPI-1); offensive tackle Johnny Boyette (AP-1, UPI-1); defensive end Butch Sursavage (AP-1, UPI-1); and linebacker Bill Hecht (AP-1, UPI-1).

== Schedule ==
Date	Time	Opponent	Site	Result	Attendance	Source
September 18	2:00 p.m.	NC State	Memorial Stadium; Clemson, SC (rivalry)	W 21–7	30,000	
September 25	1:30 p.m.	at Virginia	Scott Stadium; Charlottesville, VA	W 20–14	15,000	
October 2	2:00 p.m.	at Georgia Tech*	Grant Field; Atlanta, GA (rivalry)	L 6–38	46,736	
October 9	2:00 p.m.	at No. 4 Georgia*	Sanford Stadium; Athens, GA (rivalry)	L 9–23	45,000	
October 16	2:00 p.m.	at Duke	Duke Stadium; Durham, NC	W 3–2	31,000	
October 23	2:00 p.m.	TCU*^{†}	Memorial Stadium; Clemson, SC	W 3–0	33,000	
October 30	2:00 p.m.	Wake Forest	Memorial Stadium; Clemson, SC	W 26–13	24,000	
November 6	1:30 p.m.	at North Carolina	Kenan Memorial Stadium; Chapel Hill, NC	L 13–17	38,500	
November 13	2:00 p.m.	Maryland	Memorial Stadium; Clemson, SC	L 0–6	26,000	
November 20	2:00 p.m.	at South Carolina*	Carolina Stadium; Columbia, SC (rivalry)	L 16–17^{[a]}	44,500	
*Non-conference game; ^{†}Homecoming; Rankings from AP Poll released prior to the game; All times are in Eastern time

^a South Carolina was forced by the ACC to forfeit all conference games due to ineligible players. Clemson and NC State, who had both lost to South Carolina, were declared co-champions.
