= 1962 Duke Blue Devils football team =

American college football season

1962 Duke Blue Devils football

ACC champion
- Conference: Atlantic Coast Conference

Ranking
- Coaches: No. 14
- Record: 8–2 (6–0 ACC)
- Head coach: William D. Murray (12th season)
- MVP: Jean Berry
- Captain: Johnny Markas
- Home stadium: Duke Stadium

1962 Atlantic Coast Conference football standings
	Conf.					Overall
Team	W		L		T	W		L		T
Duke $	6	–	0	–	0	8	–	2	–	0
Clemson	5	–	1	–	0	6	–	4	–	0
Maryland	5	–	2	–	0	6	–	4	–	0
South Carolina	3	–	4	–	0	4	–	5	–	1
NC State	3	–	4	–	0	3	–	6	–	1
North Carolina	3	–	4	–	0	3	–	7	–	0
Virginia	1	–	4	–	0	5	–	5	–	0
Wake Forest	0	–	7	–	0	0	–	10	–	0
$ – Conference champion

The 1962 Duke Blue Devils football team represented Duke University as member of the Atlantic Coast Conference (ACC) during the 1962 NCAA University Division football season. Led by 12-year head coach William D. Murray, the Blue Devils compiled an overall record of 8–2 with a mark of 6–0 in conference play, winning the ACC title for the third consecutive season.

Duke was ranked No. 8 in the AP poll for the season opener against USC, but dropped out of the rankings following the loss and was not ranked again for the remainder of the season. The Blue Devils declined an invitation to play in the 1962 Gator Bowl. Duke's 1962 ACC title was the school's last outright championship win until the 2025 season.

== Schedule ==
Date	Opponent	Rank	Site	Result	Attendance	Source
September 22	at USC*	No. 8	Los Angeles Memorial Coliseum; Los Angeles, CA	L 7–14	26,400	
September 29	South Carolina		Duke Stadium; Durham, NC	W 21–8	24,500	
October 6	vs. Florida*		Gator Bowl Stadium; Jacksonville, FL	W 28–21	30,000	
October 13	California*^{†}		Duke Stadium; Durham, NC	W 21–7	31,000	
October 20	at Clemson		Memorial Stadium; Clemson, SC	W 16–0	38,000	
October 27	NC State		Duke Stadium; Durham, NC (rivalry)	W 21–14	23,000	
November 3	Georgia Tech*		Duke Stadium; Durham, NC	L 9–20	44,000	
November 10	Maryland		Duke Stadium; Durham, NC	W 10–7	26,000	
November 17	at Wake Forest		Bowman Gray Stadium; Winston-Salem, NC (rivalry)	W 50–0	12,000	
November 24	at North Carolina		Kenan Stadium; Chapel Hill, NC (Victory Bell)	W 16–14	40,000	
*Non-conference game; ^{†}Homecoming; Rankings from AP Poll released prior to the game
