= 1965 South Carolina Gamecocks football team =

American college football season

1965 South Carolina Gamecocks football
- Conference: Atlantic Coast Conference
- Record: 5–5 (4–2 ACC, 4 wins forfeited)
- Head coach: Marvin Bass (5th season)
- Captains: J. R. Wilburn; Doug Senter
- Home stadium: Carolina Stadium

1965 Atlantic Coast Conference football standings
	Conf.					Overall
Team	W		L		T	W		L		T
NC State +	5	–	2	–	0	6	–	4	–	0†
Clemson +	5	–	2	–	0	5	–	5	–	0†
Duke	4	–	2	–	0	6	–	4	–	0
Maryland	3	–	3	–	0	4	–	6	–	0
North Carolina	3	–	3	–	0	4	–	6	–	0
Virginia	3	–	3	–	0	4	–	6	–	0†
Wake Forest	2	–	4	–	0	3	–	7	–	0†
South Carolina	0	–	6	–	0	5	–	5	–	0†
+ – Conference co-champions; † South Carolina forfeited its 4 conference wins (Clemson, NC State, Virginia, Wake Forest) due to use of ineligible players. This improved Clemson and NC State from 4–3 to 5–2, making them co-champions. Overall records did not change due to the forfeits. Duke and South Carolina were originally co-champions with records of 4–2.

The 1965 South Carolina Gamecocks football team represented the University of South Carolina as a member of the Atlantic Coast Conference (ACC) during the 1965 NCAA University Division football season. Led by Marvin Bass in his fifth and final season, South Carolina played home games at Carolina Stadium in Columbia, South Carolina.

The Gamecocks finished the season with an overall record of 5–5 with a mark of 4–2 in conference play, sharing the ACC title with Duke. In July 1966, the ACC ruled that South Carolina had used two ineligible players during the 1965 season and required the Gamecocks to forfeit their four conference victories and share of the conference title. However, the Gamecocks and the NCAA do not acknowledge these forfeits, and their records continue to show the record of 5-5 (4-2)

== Schedule ==
Date	Opponent	Site	Result	Attendance	Source
September 18	at The Citadel*	Johnson Hagood Stadium; Charleston, SC	W 13–3	20,111	
September 25	Duke	Carolina Stadium; Columbia, SC	L 15–20	39,000	
October 2	NC State	Carolina Stadium; Columbia, SC	W 13–7	20,314	
October 9	at Tennessee*	Neyland Stadium; Knoxville, TN (rivalry)	L 3–24	38,519	
October 16	Wake Forest	Carolina Stadium; Columbia, SC	W 38–7	28,000	
October 23	at No. 9 LSU*	Tiger Stadium; Baton Rouge, LA	L 7–21	66,000	
October 30	Maryland	Carolina Stadium; Columbia, SC	L 14–27	30,000	
November 6	at Virginia	Scott Stadium; Charlottesville, VA	W 17–7	15,000–18,000	
November 13	at No. 5 Alabama*	Denny Stadium; Tuscaloosa, AL	L 14–35	38,776–40,500	
November 20	Clemson	Carolina Stadium; Columbia, SC (rivalry)	W 17–16	44,500	
*Non-conference game; Rankings from AP Poll released prior to the game
