= 1965 North Carolina Tar Heels football team =

American college football season

1965 North Carolina Tar Heels football
- Conference: Atlantic Coast Conference
- Record: 4–6 (3–3 ACC)
- Head coach: Jim Hickey (7th season)
- Captains: Hank Barden; Ed Stringer
- Home stadium: Kenan Memorial Stadium

1965 Atlantic Coast Conference football standings
	Conf.					Overall
Team	W		L		T	W		L		T
NC State +	5	–	2	–	0	6	–	4	–	0†
Clemson +	5	–	2	–	0	5	–	5	–	0†
Duke	4	–	2	–	0	6	–	4	–	0
Maryland	3	–	3	–	0	4	–	6	–	0
North Carolina	3	–	3	–	0	4	–	6	–	0
Virginia	3	–	3	–	0	4	–	6	–	0†
Wake Forest	2	–	4	–	0	3	–	7	–	0†
South Carolina	0	–	6	–	0	5	–	5	–	0†
+ – Conference co-champions; † South Carolina forfeited its 4 conference wins (Clemson, NC State, Virginia, Wake Forest) due to use of ineligible players. This improved Clemson and NC State from 4–3 to 5–2, making them co-champions. Overall records did not change due to the forfeits. Duke and South Carolina were originally co-champions with records of 4–2.

The 1965 North Carolina Tar Heels football team represented the University of North Carolina at Chapel Hill during the 1965 NCAA University Division football season. The Tar Heels were led by seventh-year head coach Jim Hickey and played their home games at Kenan Memorial Stadium in Chapel Hill, North Carolina.

== Schedule ==
Date	Time	Opponent	Site	Result	Attendance	Source
September 18	1:30 p.m.	No. 4 Michigan*	Kenan Memorial Stadium; Chapel Hill, NC	L 24–31	41,000	
September 25	1:30 p.m.	at Ohio State*	Ohio Stadium; Columbus, OH	W 14–3	80,182	
October 2	1:30 p.m.	Virginia	Kenan Memorial Stadium; Chapel Hill, NC (South's Oldest Rivalry)	L 17–21	38,000	
October 9	1:30 p.m.	at NC State	Riddick Stadium; Raleigh, NC (rivalry)	W 10–7	20,600	
October 16	1:30 p.m.	Maryland	Kenan Memorial Stadium; Chapel Hill, NC	W 12–10	30,000	
October 23	2:00 p.m.	at Wake Forest	Bowman Gray Stadium; Winston-Salem, NC (rivalry)	L 10–12	17,500	
October 30	1:30 p.m.	Georgia*	Kenan Memorial Stadium; Chapel Hill, NC	L 35–47	43,000	
November 6	1:30 p.m.	Clemson	Kenan Memorial Stadium; Chapel Hill, NC	W 17–13	38,500	
November 13	1:30 p.m.	at No. 4 Notre Dame*	Notre Dame Stadium; Notre Dame, IN (rivalry)	L 0–17	59,216	
November 20	2:00 p.m.	at Duke	Duke Stadium; Durham, NC (Victory Bell)	L 7–34	45,000	
*Non-conference game; Rankings from AP Poll released prior to the game; All times are in Eastern time
