= 1962 NC State Wolfpack football team =

American college football season

1962 NC State Wolfpack football
- Conference: Atlantic Coast Conference
- Record: 3–6–1 (3–4 ACC)
- Head coach: Earle Edwards (9th season)
- Home stadium: Riddick Stadium

1962 Atlantic Coast Conference football standings
| | Conf. | | | | | Overall |
| Team | W | | L | | T | W | | L | | T |
|---|---|---|---|---|---|---|---|---|---|---|
| Duke $ | 6 | – | 0 | – | 0 | 8 | – | 2 | – | 0 |
| Clemson | 5 | – | 1 | – | 0 | 6 | – | 4 | – | 0 |
| Maryland | 5 | – | 2 | – | 0 | 6 | – | 4 | – | 0 |
| South Carolina | 3 | – | 4 | – | 0 | 4 | – | 5 | – | 1 |
| NC State | 3 | – | 4 | – | 0 | 3 | – | 6 | – | 1 |
| North Carolina | 3 | – | 4 | – | 0 | 3 | – | 7 | – | 0 |
| Virginia | 1 | – | 4 | – | 0 | 5 | – | 5 | – | 0 |
| Wake Forest | 0 | – | 7 | – | 0 | 0 | – | 10 | – | 0 |
$ – Conference champion

The 1962 NC State Wolfpack football team represented North Carolina State University during the 1962 NCAA University Division football season. The Wolfpack were led by ninth-year head coach Earle Edwards and played their home games at Riddick Stadium in Raleigh, North Carolina. They competed as members of the Atlantic Coast Conference, finishing tied for fourth.

== Schedule ==
| Date | Opponent | Site | Result | Attendance | Source |
|---|---|---|---|---|---|
| September 22 | at North Carolina | Kenan Memorial Stadium; Chapel Hill, NC (rivalry) | W 7–6 | 42,000 | |
| September 29 | Clemson | Riddick Stadium; Raleigh, NC (rivalry) | L 0–7 | 14,000 | |
| October 6 | Maryland | Riddick Stadium; Raleigh, NC | L 6–14 | 13,000 | |
| October 13 | at Nebraska* | Memorial Stadium; Lincoln, NE | L 14–19 | 36,867 | |
| October 20 | at Southern Miss* | Ladd Stadium; Mobile, AL | L 0–30 | 10,502 | |
| October 27 | at Duke | Duke Stadium; Durham, NC (rivalry) | L 14–21 | 23,000 | |
| November 3 | at Georgia* | Sanford Stadium; Athens, GA | T 10–10 | 31,000 | |
| November 10 | at South Carolina | Carolina Stadium; Columbia, SC | L 6–17 | 19,938 | |
| November 17 | Virginia | Riddick Stadium; Raleigh, NC | W 24–12 | 16,500 | |
| November 22 | at Wake Forest | Bowman Gray Stadium; Winston-Salem, NC (rivalry) | W 27–3 | 5,000 | |
*Non-conference game
