= 1962 Clemson Tigers football team =

American college football season

1962 Clemson Tigers football
- Conference: Atlantic Coast Conference
- Record: 6–4 (5–1 ACC)
- Head coach: Frank Howard (23rd season)
- Captain: Dave Hynes
- Home stadium: Memorial Stadium

1962 Atlantic Coast Conference football standings
	Conf.					Overall
Team	W		L		T	W		L		T
Duke $	6	–	0	–	0	8	–	2	–	0
Clemson	5	–	1	–	0	6	–	4	–	0
Maryland	5	–	2	–	0	6	–	4	–	0
South Carolina	3	–	4	–	0	4	–	5	–	1
NC State	3	–	4	–	0	3	–	6	–	1
North Carolina	3	–	4	–	0	3	–	7	–	0
Virginia	1	–	4	–	0	5	–	5	–	0
Wake Forest	0	–	7	–	0	0	–	10	–	0
$ – Conference champion

The 1962 Clemson Tigers football team was an American football team that represented Clemson University in the Atlantic Coast Conference (ACC) during the 1962 NCAA University Division football season. In its 23rd season under head coach Frank Howard, the team compiled a 6–4 record (5–1 against conference opponents), finished second in the ACC, and outscored opponents by a total of 168 to 130. The team played its home games at Memorial Stadium in Clemson, South Carolina.

Dave Hynes was the team captain. The team's statistical leaders included Jim Parker with 431 passing yards, Pat Crain with 348 rushing yards, Johnny Case with 213 receiving yards, and Charlie Dumas with 30 points scored (5 touchdowns).

== Schedule ==
Date	Time	Opponent	Site	Result	Attendance	Source
September 22	2:00 p.m.	at Georgia Tech*	Grant Field; Atlanta, GA (rivalry)	L 9–26	51,140	
September 29	1:30 p.m.	at NC State	Riddick Stadium; Raleigh, NC (rivlary)	W 7–0	14,000	
October 6	2:00 p.m.	at Wake Forest	Bowman Gray Stadium; Winston-Salem, NC	W 24–7	8,100	
October 13	2:00 p.m.	Georgia*	Memorial Stadium; Clemson, SC (rivalry)	L 16–24	30,000	
October 20	2:00 p.m.	Duke	Memorial Stadium; Clemson, SC	L 0–16	38,000	
October 27	2:00 p.m.	Auburn*	Memorial Stadium; Clemson, SC (rivalry)	L 14–17	56,319	
November 3	2:00 p.m.	North Carolina^{†}	Memorial Stadium; Clemson, SC	W 17–6	21,000	
November 10	2:00 p.m.	at Furman*	Sirrine Stadium; Greenville, SC	W 44–3		
November 17	1:30 p.m.	at Maryland	Byrd Stadium; College Park, MD	W 17–14	23,000	
November 24	1:00 p.m.	South Carolina	Memorial Stadium; Clemson, SC (rivlary)	W 20–17	45,000	
*Non-conference game; ^{†}Homecoming; All times are in Eastern time
