= 1965 Duke Blue Devils football team =

American college football season

1965 Duke Blue Devils football
- Conference: Atlantic Coast Conference
- Record: 6–4 (4–2 ACC)
- Head coach: William D. Murray (15th season)
- MVP: John McNabb
- Captain: John Gutekunst
- Home stadium: Duke Stadium

1965 Atlantic Coast Conference football standings
| | Conf. | | | | | Overall |
| Team | W | | L | | T | W | | L | | T |
|---|---|---|---|---|---|---|---|---|---|---|
| NC State + | 5 | – | 2 | – | 0 | 6 | – | 4 | – | 0† |
| Clemson + | 5 | – | 2 | – | 0 | 5 | – | 5 | – | 0† |
| Duke | 4 | – | 2 | – | 0 | 6 | – | 4 | – | 0 |
| Maryland | 3 | – | 3 | – | 0 | 4 | – | 6 | – | 0 |
| North Carolina | 3 | – | 3 | – | 0 | 4 | – | 6 | – | 0 |
| Virginia | 3 | – | 3 | – | 0 | 4 | – | 6 | – | 0† |
| Wake Forest | 2 | – | 4 | – | 0 | 3 | – | 7 | – | 0† |
| South Carolina | 0 | – | 6 | – | 0 | 5 | – | 5 | – | 0† |
+ – Conference co-champions; † South Carolina forfeited its 4 conference wins (Clemson, NC State, Virginia, Wake Forest) due to use of ineligible players. This improved Clemson and NC State from 4–3 to 5–2, making them co-champions. Overall records did not change due to the forfeits. Duke and South Carolina were originally co-champions with records of 4–2.

The 1965 Duke Blue Devils football team was an American football team that represented Duke University as a member of the Atlantic Coast Conference (ACC) during the 1965 NCAA University Division football season. In their 15th year under head coach William D. Murray, the Blue Devils compiled an overall record of 6–4, with a conference record of 4–2, and finished third in the ACC.

== Schedule ==
| Date | Opponent | Site | Result | Attendance | Source |
|---|---|---|---|---|---|
| September 18 | at Virginia | Scott Stadium; Charlottesville, VA | W 21–7 | 27,800 | |
| September 25 | at South Carolina | Carolina Stadium; Columbia, SC | W 20–15 | 39,000 | |
| October 2 | at Rice* | Rice Stadium; Houston, TX | W 41–21 | 22,000 | |
| October 9 | Pittsburgh* | Duke Stadium; Durham, NC | W 21–13 | 25,000 | |
| October 16 | Clemson^{†} | Duke Stadium; Durham, NC | L 2–3 | 31,000 | |
| October 23 | at Illinois* | Memorial Stadium; Champaign, IL | L 14–28 | 47,077 | |
| October 30 | at Georgia Tech* | Grant Field; Atlanta, GA | L 23–35 | 46,981 | |
| November 6 | at NC State | Riddick Stadium; Raleigh, NC (rivalry) | L 0–21 | 19,500 | |
| November 13 | Wake Forest | Duke Stadium; Durham, NC (rivalry) | W 40–7 | 25,000 | |
| November 20 | North Carolina | Duke Stadium; Durham, NC (Victory Bell) | W 34–7 | 45,000 | |
*Non-conference game; ^{†}Homecoming
