= 1962 Wake Forest Demon Deacons football team =

American college football season

1962 Wake Forest Demon Deacons football
- Conference: Atlantic Coast Conference
- Record: 0–10 (0–7 ACC)
- Head coach: Bill Hildebrand (3rd season)
- Captain: Bill Shendow
- Home stadium: Bowman Gray Stadium

1962 Atlantic Coast Conference football standings
	Conf.					Overall
Team	W		L		T	W		L		T
Duke $	6	–	0	–	0	8	–	2	–	0
Clemson	5	–	1	–	0	6	–	4	–	0
Maryland	5	–	2	–	0	6	–	4	–	0
South Carolina	3	–	4	–	0	4	–	5	–	1
NC State	3	–	4	–	0	3	–	6	–	1
North Carolina	3	–	4	–	0	3	–	7	–	0
Virginia	1	–	4	–	0	5	–	5	–	0
Wake Forest	0	–	7	–	0	0	–	10	–	0
$ – Conference champion

The 1962 Wake Forest Demon Deacons football team was an American football team that represented Wake Forest University during the 1962 NCAA University Division football season. In its third season under head coach Bill Hildebrand, the team compiled a 0–10 record and finished in last place in the Atlantic Coast Conference (ACC).

== Schedule ==
Date	Opponent	Site	Result	Attendance	Source
September 22	at Army*	Michie Stadium; West Point, NY	L 14–40	17,205–17,250	
September 29	at Maryland	Byrd Stadium; College Park, MD	L 2–13	12,000	
October 6	Clemson	Bowman Gray Stadium; Winston-Salem, NC	L 7–24	8,100	
October 13	at South Carolina	Carolina Stadium; Columbia, SC	L 6–27	18,942	
October 20	at Virginia	Scott Stadium; Charlottesville, VA	L 12–14	16,000	
October 27	at North Carolina	Kenan Memorial Stadium; Chapel Hill, NC (rivalry)	L 14–23	26,000	
November 3	at Tennessee*	Shields–Watkins Field; Knoxville, TN	L 0–23	22,325	
November 10	at Virginia Tech*	Miles Stadium; Blacksburg, VA	L 8–37	8,200	
November 17	Duke	Bowman Gray Stadium; Winston-Salem, NC (rivalry)	L 0–50	12,000	
November 22	NC State	Bowman Gray Stadium; Winston-Salem, NC (rivalry)	L 3–27	5,000	
*Non-conference game

== Team leaders ==
Category	Team Leader	Att/Cth	Yds
Passing	John Mackovic	57/130	594
Rushing	Brian Piccolo	77	324
Receiving	Henry Newton	19	265
