= 1962 Virginia Cavaliers football team =

American college football season

1962 Virginia Cavaliers football
- Conference: Atlantic Coast Conference
- Record: 5–5 (1–4 ACC)
- Head coach: Bill Elias (2nd season)
- Captains: Gary Cuozzo; Carl Kuhn; Dave Graham
- Home stadium: Scott Stadium

1962 Atlantic Coast Conference football standings
	Conf.					Overall
Team	W		L		T	W		L		T
Duke $	6	–	0	–	0	8	–	2	–	0
Clemson	5	–	1	–	0	6	–	4	–	0
Maryland	5	–	2	–	0	6	–	4	–	0
South Carolina	3	–	4	–	0	4	–	5	–	1
NC State	3	–	4	–	0	3	–	6	–	1
North Carolina	3	–	4	–	0	3	–	7	–	0
Virginia	1	–	4	–	0	5	–	5	–	0
Wake Forest	0	–	7	–	0	0	–	10	–	0
$ – Conference champion

The 1962 Virginia Cavaliers football team represented the University of Virginia as a member of the Atlantic Coast Conference (ACC) during the 1962 NCAA University Division football season. Led by second-year head coach Bill Elias, the Cavaliers compiled an overall record of 5–5 with a mark of 1–4 in conference play, placing seventh in the ACC. Virginia played home games at Scott Stadium in Charlottesville, Virginia.

== Schedule ==
Date	Opponent	Site	Result	Attendance	Source
September 22	at William & Mary*	Cary Field; Williamsburg, VA	W 19–7	12,000	
October 6	vs. Virginia Tech*	Victory Stadium; Roanoke, VA (Harvest Bowl, rivalry)	L 15–20	18,000	
October 13	VMI*	Scott Stadium; Charlottesville, VA	W 28–6	19,000	
October 20	Wake Forest^{†}	Scott Stadium; Charlottesville, VA	W 14–12	16,500	
October 27	Davidson*	Scott Stadium; Charlottesville, VA	W 34–7	18,000	
November 3	at South Carolina	Carolina Stadium; Columbia, SC	L 6–40	17,033	
November 10	North Carolina	Scott Stadium; Charlottesville, VA (South's Oldest Rivalry)	L 7–11	17,000	
November 17	at NC State	Riddick Stadium; Raleigh, NC	L 12–24	16,500	
November 24	at Maryland	Byrd Stadium; College Park, MD (rivalry)	L 18–40	17,000	
December 1	at Rutgers*	Rutgers Stadium; Piscataway, NJ	W 41–0	16,500	
*Non-conference game; ^{†}Homecoming
