= 1965 NC State Wolfpack football team =

American college football season

1965 NC State Wolfpack football

ACC co-champion
- Conference: Atlantic Coast Conference
- Record: 7–3 (5–2 ACC)
- Head coach: Earle Edwards (12th season)
- Home stadium: Riddick Stadium

1965 Atlantic Coast Conference football standings
	Conf.					Overall
Team	W		L		T	W		L		T
NC State +	5	–	2	–	0	6	–	4	–	0†
Clemson +	5	–	2	–	0	5	–	5	–	0†
Duke	4	–	2	–	0	6	–	4	–	0
Maryland	3	–	3	–	0	4	–	6	–	0
North Carolina	3	–	3	–	0	4	–	6	–	0
Virginia	3	–	3	–	0	4	–	6	–	0†
Wake Forest	2	–	4	–	0	3	–	7	–	0†
South Carolina	0	–	6	–	0	5	–	5	–	0†
+ – Conference co-champions; † South Carolina forfeited its 4 conference wins (Clemson, NC State, Virginia, Wake Forest) due to use of ineligible players. This improved Clemson and NC State from 4–3 to 5–2, making them co-champions. Overall records did not change due to the forfeits. Duke and South Carolina were originally co-champions with records of 4–2.

The 1965 NC State Wolfpack football team represented North Carolina State University during the 1965 NCAA University Division football season. The Wolfpack were led by 12th-year head coach Earle Edwards and played their home games at Riddick Stadium for the last time before moving to Carter Stadium. They competed as members of the Atlantic Coast Conference. Originally finished tied for third in the conference, forfeits by South Carolina due to an ineligible player moved NC State into a tie for first and a shared conference title with Clemson.

== Schedule ==
Date	Opponent	Site	Result	Attendance	Source
September 18	at Clemson	Memorial Stadium; Clemson, SC (rivalry)	L 7–21	30,000	
September 25	Wake Forest	Riddick Stadium; Raleigh, NC (rivalry)	W 13–11	17,500	
October 2	at South Carolina	Carolina Stadium; Columbia, SC	W 7–13 (forfeit win)	20,314	
October 9	North Carolina	Riddick Stadium; Raleigh, NC (rivalry)	L 7–10	20,600	
October 16	at No. 9 Florida*	Florida Field; Gainesville, FL	L 6–28	48,010	
October 23	at Maryland	Byrd Stadium; College Park, MD	W 29–7	30,000	
October 30	at Virginia	Scott Stadium; Charlottesville, VA	W 13–0	25,000	
November 6	Duke	Riddick Stadium; Raleigh, NC (rivalry)	W 21–0	19,500	
November 13	Florida State*	Riddick Stadium; Raleigh, NC	W 3–0	22,000	
November 20	at Iowa*	Iowa Stadium; Iowa City, IA	W 28–20	37,000	
*Non-conference game; Rankings from AP Poll released prior to the game
