= 1962 North Carolina Tar Heels football team =

American college football season

1962 North Carolina Tar Heels football
- Conference: Atlantic Coast Conference
- Record: 3–7 (3–4 ACC)
- Head coach: Jim Hickey (4th season)
- Captains: Joe Craver; Ward Marslender
- Home stadium: Kenan Memorial Stadium

1962 Atlantic Coast Conference football standings
	Conf.					Overall
Team	W		L		T	W		L		T
Duke $	6	–	0	–	0	8	–	2	–	0
Clemson	5	–	1	–	0	6	–	4	–	0
Maryland	5	–	2	–	0	6	–	4	–	0
South Carolina	3	–	4	–	0	4	–	5	–	1
NC State	3	–	4	–	0	3	–	6	–	1
North Carolina	3	–	4	–	0	3	–	7	–	0
Virginia	1	–	4	–	0	5	–	5	–	0
Wake Forest	0	–	7	–	0	0	–	10	–	0
$ – Conference champion

The 1962 North Carolina Tar Heels football team represented the University of North Carolina at Chapel Hill during the 1962 NCAA University Division football season. The Tar Heels were led by fourth-year head coach Jim Hickey and played their home games at Kenan Memorial Stadium. The team competed as a member of the Atlantic Coast Conference, finishing tied for fourth.

== Schedule ==
Date	Time	Opponent	Site	Result	Attendance	Source
September 22	2:00 p.m.	NC State	Kenan Memorial Stadium; Chapel Hill, NC (rivalry)	L 6–7	42,000	
September 29	1:30 p.m.	at No. 2 Ohio State*	Ohio Stadium; Columbus, OH	L 7–41	84,009	
October 6	1:30 p.m.	at Michigan State*	Spartan Stadium; East Lansing, MI	L 6–38	61,029	
October 13	2:00 p.m.	Maryland	Kenan Memorial Stadium; Chapel Hill, NC	L 13–31	26,000	
October 20	2:00 p.m.	South Carolina	Kenan Memorial Stadium; Chapel Hill, NC (rivalry)	W 19–14	25,000	
October 27	2:00 p.m.	Wake Forest	Kenan Memorial Stadium; Chapel Hill, NC (rivalry)	W 23–14	26,000	
November 3	2:00 p.m.	at Clemson	Memorial Stadium; Clemson, SC	L 6–17	21,000	
November 10	1:30 p.m.	at Virginia	Scott Stadium; Charlottesville, VA (South's Oldest Rivalry)	W 11–7	17,000	
November 17	2:00 p.m.	at Notre Dame*	Notre Dame Stadium; Notre Dame, IN (rivalry)	L 7–21	35,553	
November 24	2:00 p.m.	Duke	Kenan Memorial Stadium; Chapel Hill, NC (Victory Bell)	L 14–16	40,000	
*Non-conference game; Rankings from AP Poll released prior to the game; All times are in Eastern time
