= 1965 Wake Forest Demon Deacons football team =

American college football season

1965 Wake Forest Demon Deacons football
- Conference: Atlantic Coast Conference
- Record: 3–7 (2–4 ACC)
- Head coach: Bill Tate (2nd season)
- Captain: Game captains
- Home stadium: Bowman Gray Stadium

1965 Atlantic Coast Conference football standings
	Conf.					Overall
Team	W		L		T	W		L		T
NC State +	5	–	2	–	0	6	–	4	–	0†
Clemson +	5	–	2	–	0	5	–	5	–	0†
Duke	4	–	2	–	0	6	–	4	–	0
Maryland	3	–	3	–	0	4	–	6	–	0
North Carolina	3	–	3	–	0	4	–	6	–	0
Virginia	3	–	3	–	0	4	–	6	–	0†
Wake Forest	2	–	4	–	0	3	–	7	–	0†
South Carolina	0	–	6	–	0	5	–	5	–	0†
+ – Conference co-champions; † South Carolina forfeited its 4 conference wins (Clemson, NC State, Virginia, Wake Forest) due to use of ineligible players. This improved Clemson and NC State from 4–3 to 5–2, making them co-champions. Overall records did not change due to the forfeits. Duke and South Carolina were originally co-champions with records of 4–2.

The 1965 Wake Forest Demon Deacons football team was an American football team that represented Wake Forest University during the 1965 NCAA University Division football season. In their second season under head coach Bill Tate, the Demon Deacons compiled a 3–7 record and finished in seventh place in the Atlantic Coast Conference.

== Schedule ==
Date	Opponent	Site	Result	Attendance	Source
September 18	vs. Virginia Tech*	Victory Stadium; Roanoke, VA (Harvest Bowl)	L 3–12	20,000	
September 25	at NC State	Riddick Stadium; Raleigh, NC (rivalry)	L 11–13	17,500	
October 2	Vanderbilt*	Bowman Gray Stadium; Winston-Salem, NC	W 7–0	11,000	
October 9	Maryland	Bowman Gray Stadium; Winston-Salem, NC	L 7–10	18,000	
October 16	at South Carolina	Carolina Stadium; Columbia, SC	W 7–38	28,000	
October 23	North Carolina	Bowman Gray Stadium; Winston-Salem, NC (rivalry)	W 12–10	17,500	
October 30	at Clemson	Memorial Stadium; Clemson, SC	L 13–26	24,000	
November 6	at Florida State*	Doak Campbell Stadium; Tallahassee, FL	L 0–35	25,600	
November 13	at Duke	Duke Stadium; Durham, NC (rivalry)	L 7–40	25,000	
November 20	at Memphis State*	Memphis Memorial Stadium; Memphis, TN	W 21–20	17,800	
*Non-conference game

== Team leaders ==
Category	Team Leader	Att/Cth	Yds
Passing	Jon Wilson	44/104	513
Rushing	Andy Heck	151	497
Receiving	Ken Henry	30	367
