= Tulane Stadium =

Demolished football stadium in New Orleans, Louisiana (USA)

- The Sugar Bowl
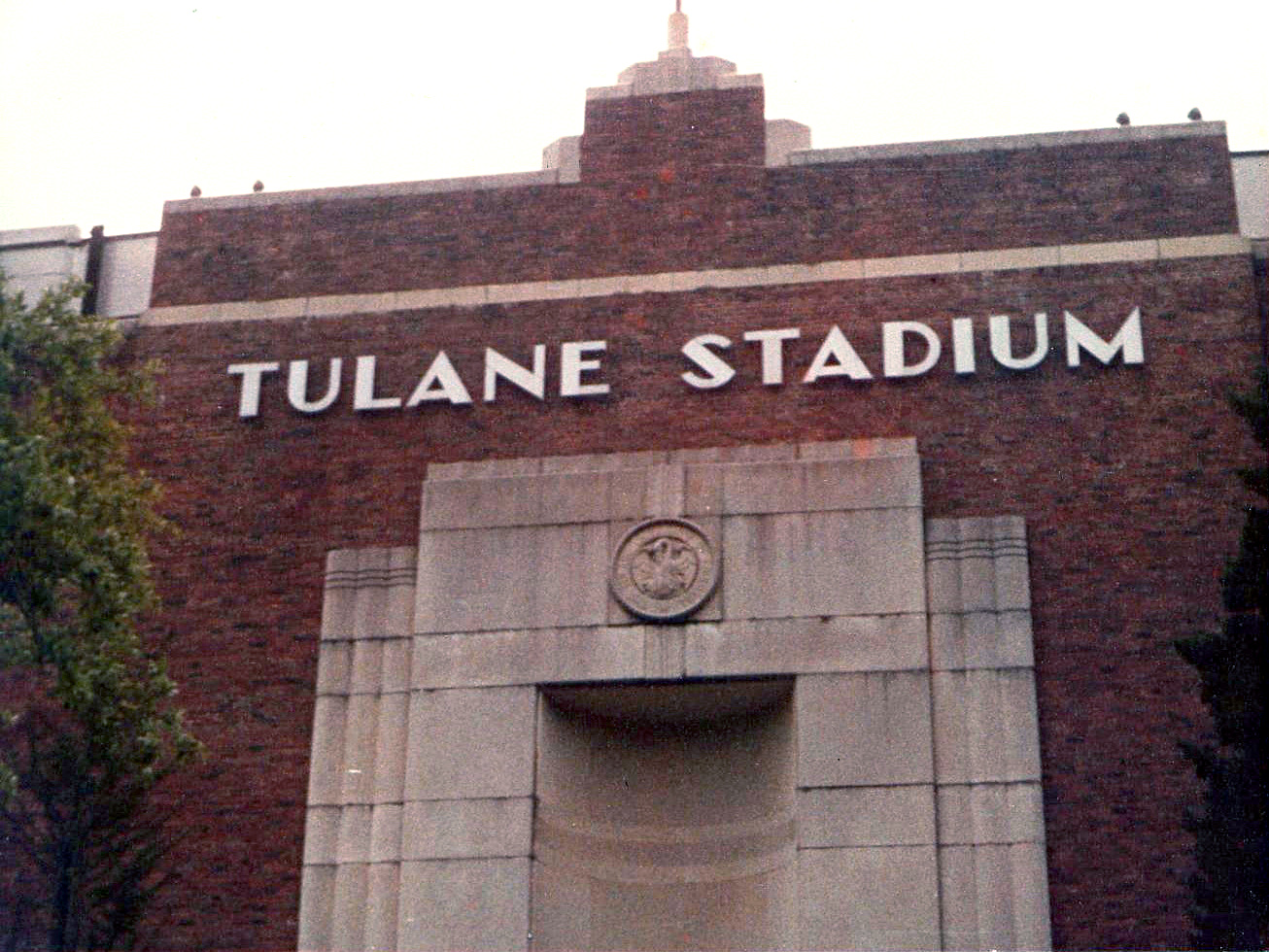
- Willow Street entrance in 1979

- Location in the United States Location in Louisiana
- Interactive map of Tulane Stadium
- Address: Willow Street and Ben Weiner Drive
- Location: Tulane University; New Orleans, Louisiana
- Coordinates: 29°56′34″N 90°7′3″W
- Owner: Tulane University
- Operator: Tulane University
- Capacity: 80,985 (1956–1975); 80,735 (1947–1955); 69,000 (1939–1946); 49,000 (1937–1938); 35,000 (1926–1936)
- Surface: Poly-Turf (1971–1979); Natural grass (1926–1970)
- Record attendance: 86,598 (December 1, 1973)

Construction
- Groundbreaking: April 7, 1924
- Opened: October 23, 1926; 100 years ago
- Closed: November 3, 1979; 46 years ago
- Demolished: November 18, 1979– June 15, 1980
- Cost: $295,968 ($60.8 million adjusted for inflation)

Tenants
- Tulane Green Wave (NCAA) 1926–1974; Sugar Bowl (NCAA) 1935–1974; New Orleans Saints (NFL) 1967–1974; Pelican Bowl (NCAA) 1974

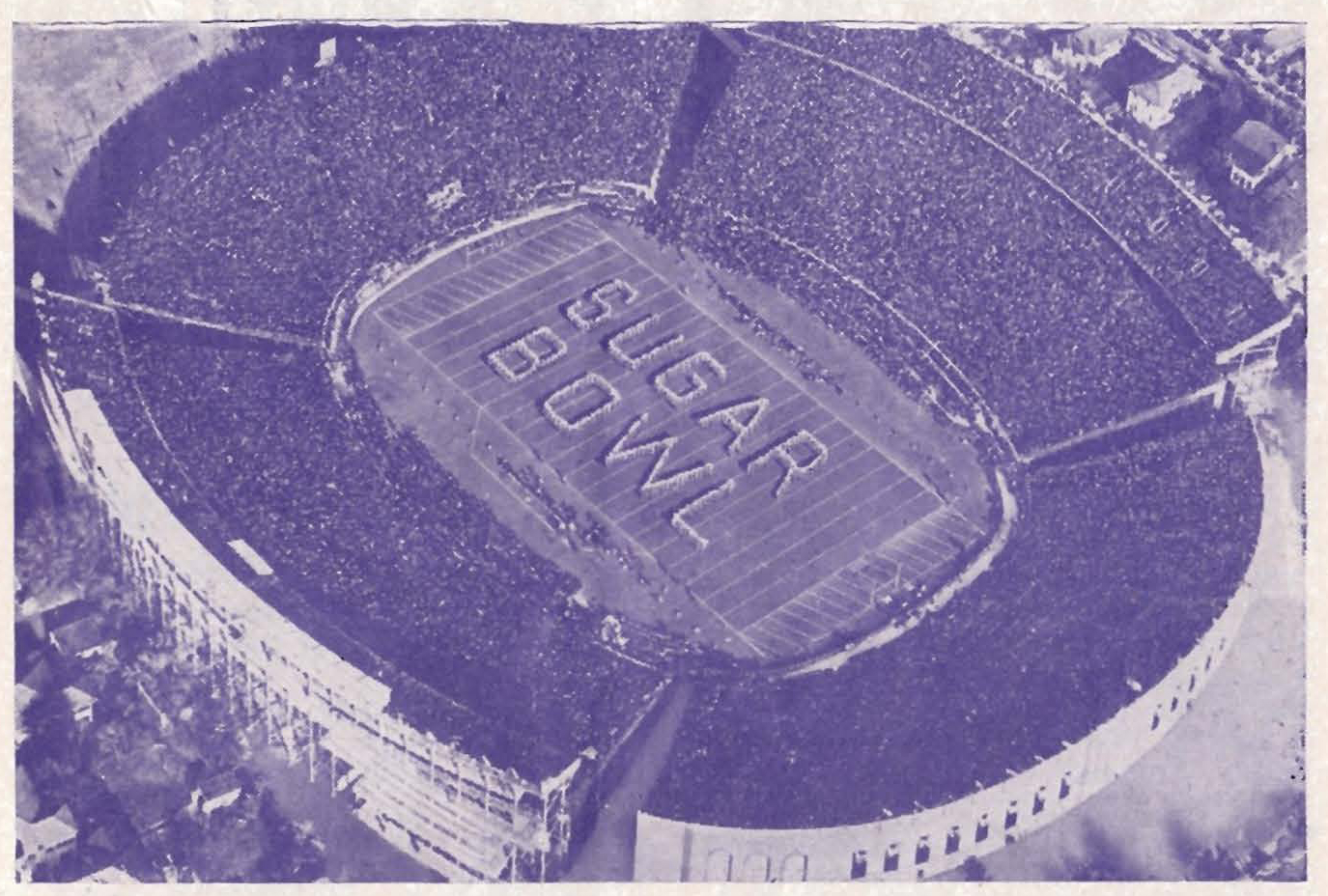
Sugar Bowl – 1948

Tulane Stadium was an outdoor football stadium in the Southern United States on the campus of Tulane University in New Orleans, Louisiana. It stood from 1926 to 1980 and was officially the Third Tulane Stadium, following the "Second Tulane Stadium", which was located where the Telephone Exchange Building is now.

The former site is currently bound by Willow Street to the south, Ben Weiner Drive to the east, the Tulane University property line west of McAlister Place, and the Hertz Basketball/Volleyball Practice Facility and the Green Wave's current home, Yulman Stadium, to the north.

Tulane Stadium hosted the Sugar Bowl through December 1974 and three of the first nine Super Bowls, in January 1970, 1972, and 1975.

== Previous Tulane Stadiums ==
=== Original Tulane Stadium ===
The Tulane football team played in the "Original Tulane Stadium" or "First Tulane Stadium" starting in 1909. The final season the team played at the stadium was the 1916 season.

=== Second Tulane Stadium ===
The Tulane football team played in the "Second Tulane Stadium", where the Telephone Exchange Building is now located, starting in 1917. Contemporaneous maps are difficult to locate but a Sanborn map in the Library of Congress digital archives indicates the stadium and track were located at present day Monroe Quad and surrounding buildings. The final season the team played at the stadium was the 1925 season. The stadium also hosted high school football games.

== Early history ==
The stadium was opened in 1926 with a seating capacity of roughly 35,000—the lower level of the final configuration's sideline seats. Tulane Stadium was built on Tulane University's campus (before 1871, Tulane's campus was a backwoods portion of Paul Foucher's property, where on a plantation closer to the river, Foucher's father-in-law, Étienne de Boré, had first granulated sugar from cane syrup).

Since the institution of the annual Sugar Bowl game, Tulane Stadium itself was often informally referred to locally as "the Sugar Bowl". It was also billed as "The Queen of Southern Stadiums". It was in a portion of Tulane University's main campus in Uptown New Orleans fronting Willow Street, with parking stretching to Claiborne Avenue. The original 1926 structure was mostly of brick and concrete.

The first Sugar Bowl game was played at the stadium on January 1, 1935, matching host Tulane against the Temple Owls from Philadelphia. The term "Sugar Bowl" had been coined by Fred Digby, sports editor of the New Orleans Item, who had been pushing for an annual New Year's Day football game since 1927.

=== Seating expansion ===
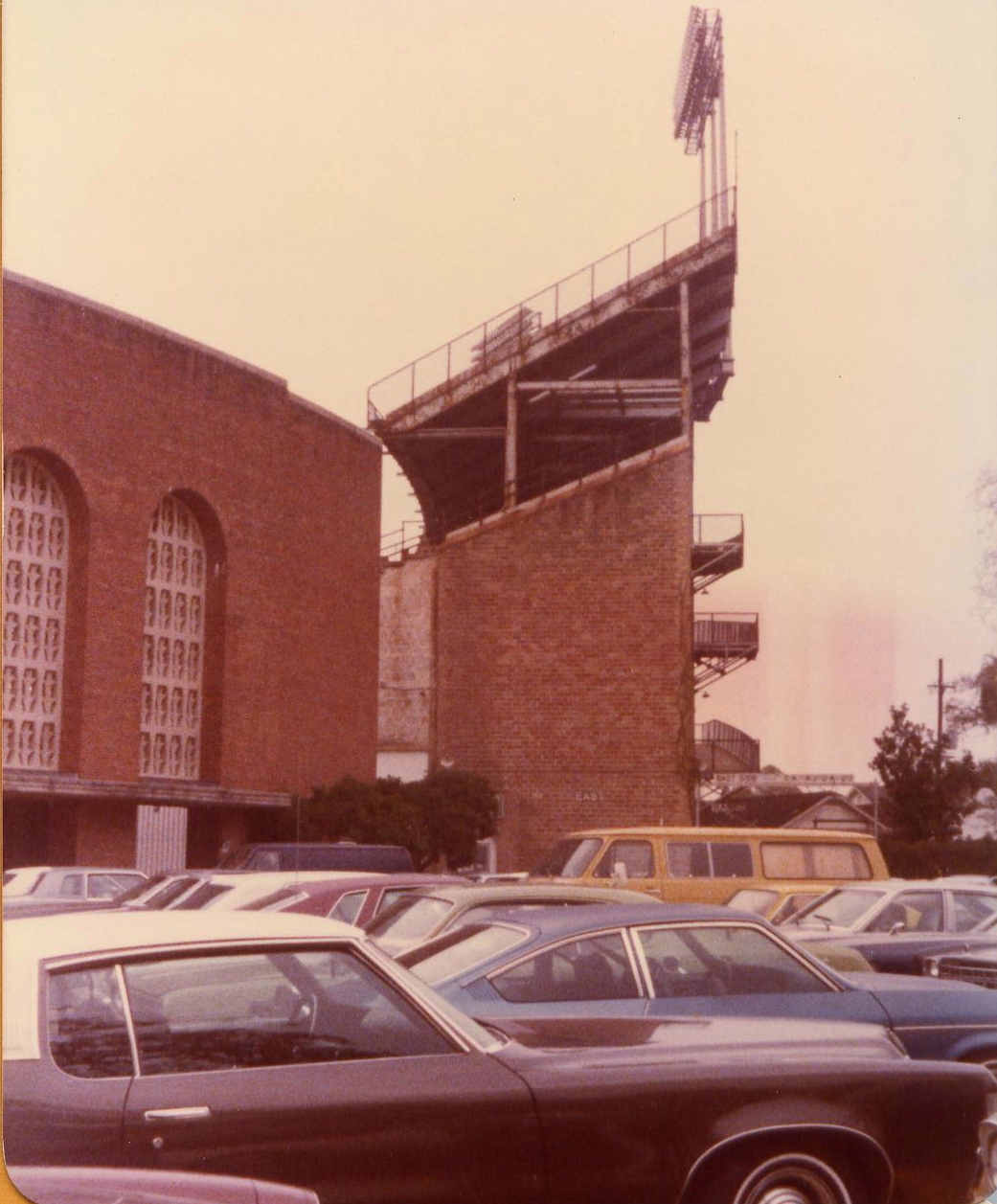
Upper deck

The Sugar Bowl proved to be a hit, and in response the north end was enclosed in 1937, creating a 49,000-seat horseshoe. In 1939, the north end and sides were double-decked, expanding capacity to 69,000. The stadium became a bowl when the south end was enclosed in 1947, expanding capacity to 80,735. A seating adjustment in 1955 brought the stadium to its final capacity of 80,985.

In its final configuration, the stadium was a concrete and steel bowl with four sections (separated at the corners of the field), and a short steel upper deck wrapping around the sides and north end of the stadium. The press box was located on the western side of the field, and the main gate (pictured above) was at the southern end of the field facing Willow Street. The support structure for the upper deck was entirely open, exposing the ramps and lattice work, and hiding the original brick facade underneath with the exception of the Willow Street end of the stadium. Lights were installed in 1957.

The record attendance for the stadium was set on December 1, 1973, when 86,598 watched Tulane defeat in-state rival LSU 14–0, ending a 25-year winless streak for the Green Wave against the Bayou Bengals. It was the last installment of the LSU–Tulane rivalry played on the Tulane campus. Thirty days later, a Sugar Bowl-record crowd of 85,161 watched Notre Dame edge Alabama 24–23 in the first meeting between the traditional powers, allowing the Fighting Irish to capture the Associated Press national championship (the Crimson Tide was voted champion by the United Press International coaches poll, which did not take a poll after bowl games until the next season).

== Professional football ==
=== New Orleans Saints ===
In addition to hosting Tulane University football games and the Sugar Bowl, the stadium was also home to the National Football League's New Orleans Saints for the first seven years of the franchise, from 1967 through 1974. The Saints' first home game was a 27–13 loss to the Los Angeles Rams on September 17, 1967, although the Saints provided fans with a memorable highlight when John Gilliam returned the opening kickoff 94 yards for a touchdown. The Saints won their last game in the stadium, 14–0 over the St. Louis Cardinals on December 8, 1974.

The largest crowd for a Saints game at Tulane Stadium came on November 26, 1967 when 83,437 fans showed up for the first meeting of the Saints-Falcons Rivalry, which the Saints won 27–24.

=== Super Bowls ===
Tulane Stadium was the site of three early Super Bowls: IV, VI, and IX. Super Bowl IX was the final professional league game ever played at the stadium. The stadium hosted the two coldest outdoor Super Bowls, Super Bowl VI on January 16, 1972, at 39 °F (4 °C); and Super Bowl IX on January 12, 1975, at 46 °F (8 °C). Super Bowl IX had been originally scheduled to be played in the Superdome, but it was unfinished.

| Date | Super Bowl | Team (Visitor) | Points | Team (Home) | Points | Spectators |
|---|---|---|---|---|---|---|
| January 11, 1970 | IV | Minnesota Vikings | 7 | Kansas City Chiefs | 23 | 80,562 |
| January 16, 1972 | VI | Dallas Cowboys | 24 | Miami Dolphins | 3 | 81,023 |
| January 12, 1975 | IX | Pittsburgh Steelers | 16 | Minnesota Vikings | 6 | 80,997 |

=== Tom Dempsey's 63-yard field goal ===
Aside from the various bowls, the most memorable moment at the stadium might have been the Saints victory over the Detroit Lions on November 8, 1970. In the NFL prior to the 1974 season, the goal posts were on the goal line instead of the end line. With seconds remaining, the Saints attempted a place kick with holder Joe Scarpati spotting at the Saints' own 37-yard line. Kicker Tom Dempsey nailed the 63-yard field goal with a couple of feet to spare, and the Saints won the game 19-17, one of only two games the Saints won that year. That record would stand alone for 28 years before it was tied by Jason Elam of the Denver Broncos, Sebastian Janikowski of the Oakland Raiders, and David Akers of the San Francisco 49ers.

Late in the 2013 NFL season, Denver Broncos kicker Matt Prater broke the shared record with a 64-yard field goal against the Tennessee Titans. On September 26, 2021, Baltimore Ravens kicker Justin Tucker set a new NFL record, hitting a 66-yard field goal on the final play of the game, beating the Detroit Lions 19–17. Tucker's record stood until November 2, 2025, when the Jacksonville Jaguars' Cam Little kicked a 68-yard field goal vs. the Las Vegas Raiders.

== Other events ==
=== Track and field ===
Track meets were once held in the stadium.

=== Soul Bowl ===
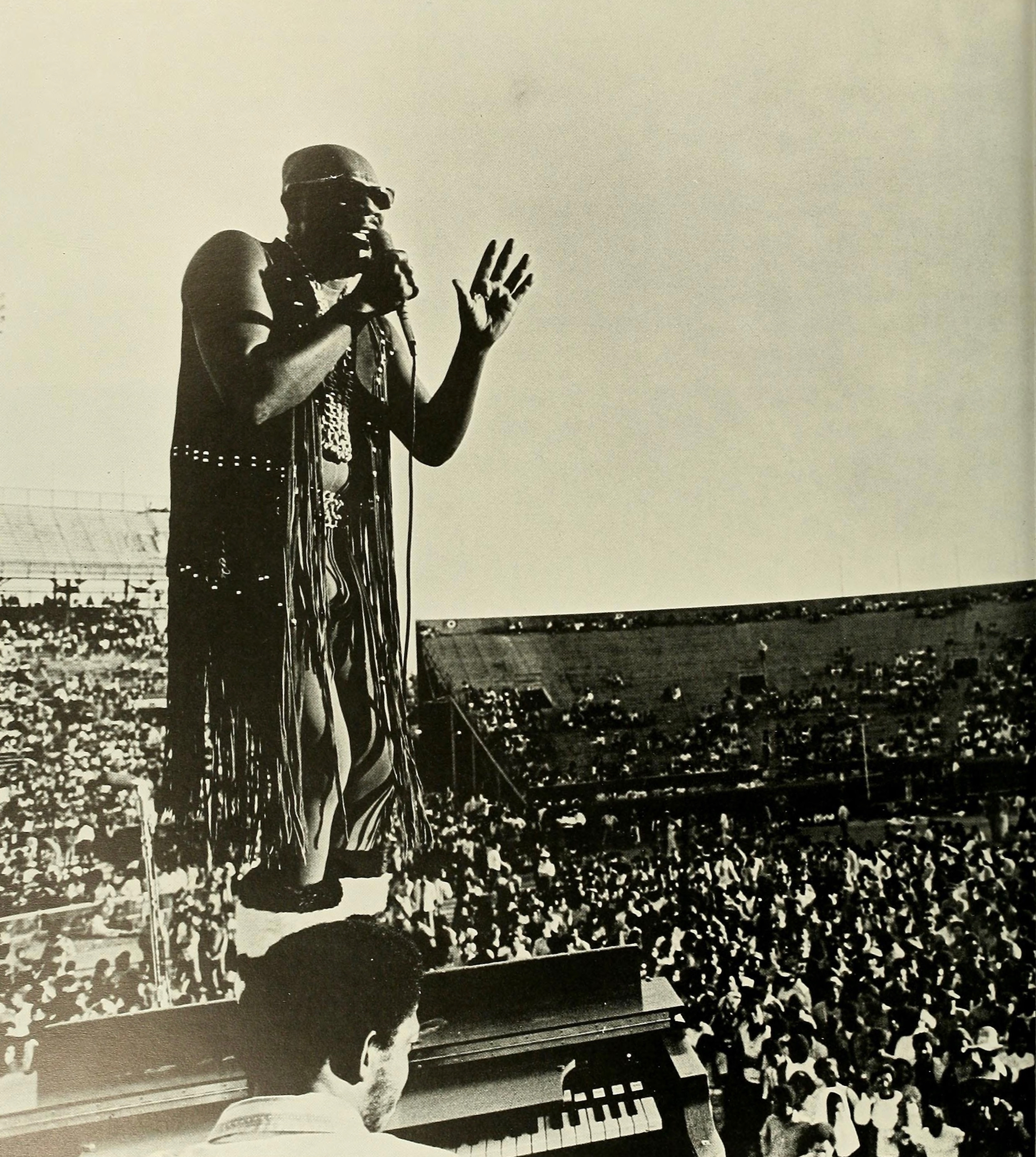
Isaac Hayes performing at Soul Bowl

The Soul Bowl was a concert held at Tulane Stadium on October 24, 1970. It was sponsored by Tulane University to aid black and minority students. All proceeds were administered by the university's student faculty Committee on Expanding Educational Opportunity. The concert had an estimated attendance of over 25,000 during its six hours of soul music performed by some of the top soul acts of that era.

The performers included James Brown, Isaac Hayes movement, The Ike & Tina Turner Revue, Jr. Walker and the All Stars, Pacific Gas & Electric, and Rare Earth.

== Final years ==
=== Following the Superdome's opening ===
On August 4, 1975, the day after the new Louisiana Superdome was opened, Tulane Stadium was condemned. Upon appeal by the university, the older concrete-and-brick section was deemed fit to use. However, due to 36 years of exposure to New Orleans' humid climate, the newer steel upper deck had rusted so badly that it was no longer safe. With Tulane and the Saints moving to the Superdome, Tulane Stadium continued in more limited use for five years with the smaller seating area, used for football practice, high school games, and other smaller events.

John Curtis Christian School won Louisiana High School Athletic Association Class AA state championship games at the stadium in 1977 and '78.

ZZ Top played Tulane Stadium during its Worldwide Texas Tour July 17, 1976. Fans rioted and threw objects at police officers, prompting Tulane to ban any future concerts on campus, a ban which has extended to Yulman Stadium. Twelve years prior, Tulane refused to host The Beatles on their second U.S. tour, forcing the band to play at the smaller City Park Stadium.

The Denver Broncos used Tulane Stadium as its practice facility prior to Super Bowl XII, the first Super Bowl played in the Superdome, as had the AFC champions who participated in the three Super Bowls played there.

=== Last Tulane game and Sugar Bowl ===
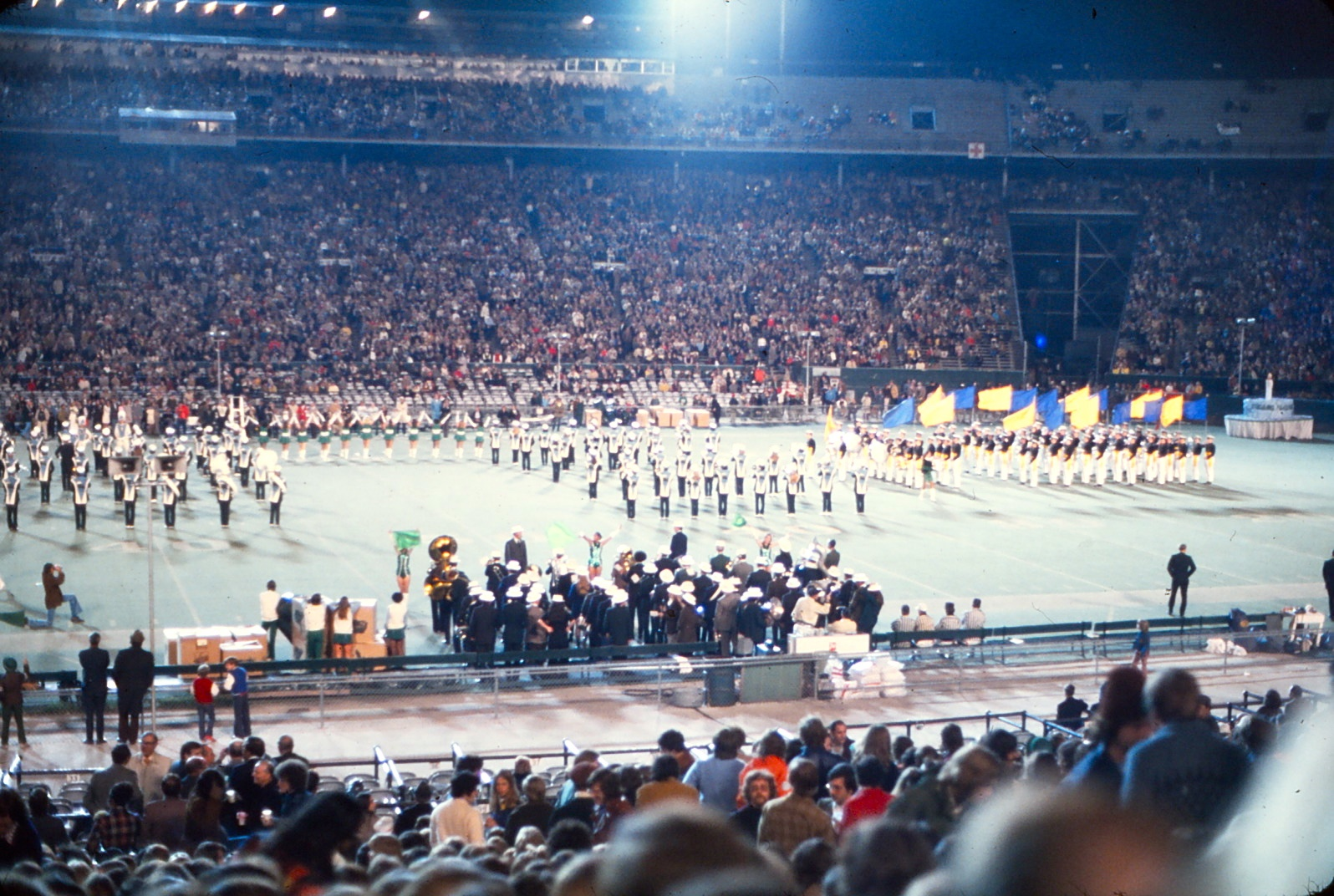
Tulane Stadium – 1973

Tulane Stadium hosted its final Green Wave game, a 26–10 loss to Ole Miss on November 30, 1974 (the game was originally scheduled to be the season opener for both teams, but was postponed due anticipated bad weather from Hurricane Carmen). Tulane would not play another on-campus game until Yulman Stadium opened in 2014.

One month after the Ole Miss–Tulane game, Nebraska won the final college game in the stadium, defeating Florida 13–10 in the Sugar Bowl on December 31.

=== Final game ===
The last game played in the stadium prior to its demolition was between New Orleans Catholic League teams Chalmette High School and Jesuit High School on November 3, 1979. The final touchdown was on a 9-yard pass from Keith Mason to Craig Stieber with 4:08 remaining, helping Chalmette win 23–9.

=== Demolition ===
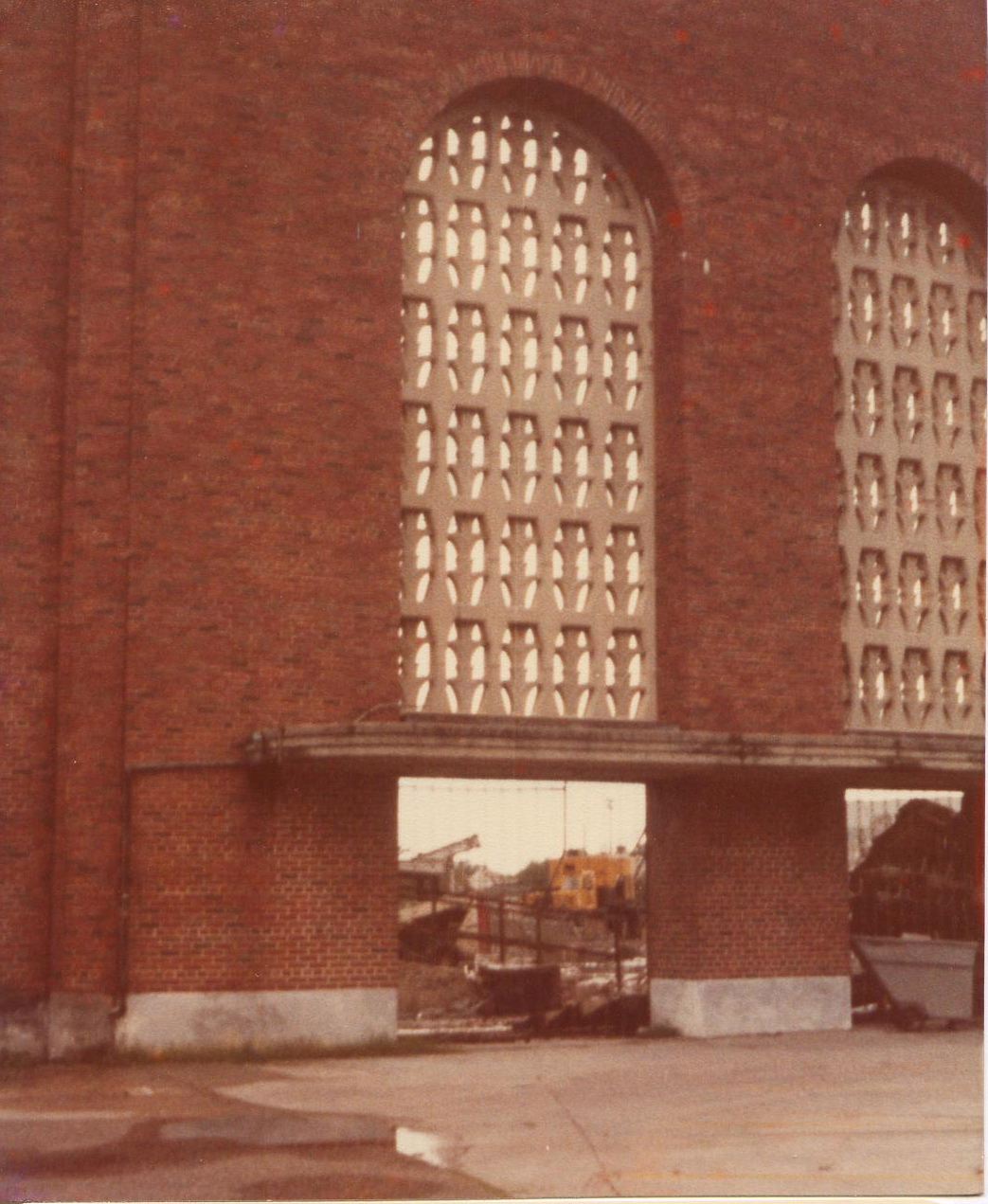
Tulane Stadium during demolition

On November 2, 1979, Tulane President Sheldon Hackney announced that the stadium would be demolished. The demolition started on November 18, 1979 and ended in June 1980. While the storage areas underneath the seating in the stadium were being emptied prior to demolition, various neglected University possessions were rediscovered, including an Ancient Egyptian mummy couple.

The site of the former stadium is now home to the Aron and Willow student housing complexes, the Diboll parking structure, the Reily Student-Recreation Center and Brown Quad.

Tulane Stadium is one of eight stadiums that had hosted a Super Bowl game which are no longer standing. Tampa Stadium, which hosted two Super Bowls, was demolished in April 1999; Stanford Stadium, which hosted one Super Bowl, was demolished and redeveloped in 2005–06; the Orange Bowl, which hosted five Super Bowls, was demolished in May 2008 with LoanDepot Park, the home ballpark of the Miami Marlins of Major League Baseball, built on its site; the Hubert H. Humphrey Metrodome in Minneapolis, which hosted one Super Bowl, was demolished in March 2014 with its replacement, U.S. Bank Stadium, which itself hosted one Super Bowl to date, built on its site; the Georgia Dome in Atlanta, which hosted two Super Bowls, was demolished in November 2017; the Pontiac Silverdome in suburban Detroit, which hosted one Super Bowl, was demolished a few months after the Georgia Dome in March 2018; and San Diego Stadium, which hosted three Super Bowls, was demolished in March 2021.

Events and tenants
| Preceded by Second Tulane Stadium | Home of the Tulane Green Wave; 1926–1974 | Succeeded by Louisiana/Mercedes-Benz/Caesars Superdome |
| Preceded by Second Tulane Stadium | Home of the Sugar Bowl; 1935–1974 | Succeeded by Louisiana/Mercedes-Benz/Caesars Superdome |
| Preceded by None | Home of the New Orleans Saints; 1967–1974 | Succeeded by Louisiana/Mercedes-Benz/Caesars Superdome |
| Preceded by Orange Bowl; Orange Bowl; Rice Stadium | Host of the Super Bowl; IV 1970; VI 1972; IX 1975 | Succeeded by Orange Bowl; Los Angeles Memorial Coliseum; Orange Bowl |
