= Newsletter (disambiguation) =

A newsletter is a small publication reporting the personal opinion of individuals, or activities of a business or an organization. It can also refer to a traditional newspaper, print or online that is published in the format of a newsletter.

Newsletter may also refer to:

- The News Letter, a Northern Irish newspaper
- The Johns Hopkins News-Letter, a student newspaper of the Johns Hopkins University
