= Sugar Bowl =

Annual American college football game

- Allstate Sugar Bowl
- Stadium: Caesars Superdome
- Location: New Orleans, Louisiana
- Previous stadiums: Tulane Stadium (1934–1974)
- Temporary venue: Georgia Dome, Atlanta, Georgia (2006) (Note: The January 2006 game was relocated because of damage from Hurricane Katrina.)
- Operated: 1935–present
- Championship affiliation: CFP (2014–present); BCS (1998–2013); Bowl Alliance (1995–1997); Bowl Coalition (1992–1994)
- Previous conference tie-ins: SEC (unofficial 1935–1975, official 1976–2026); Big 12 (2015–2026)
- Payout: US$17 million per team (As of 2014)
- Website: allstatesugarbowl.org

Sponsors
- USF&G Financial Services (1988–1995); Nokia (1996–2006); Allstate Insurance (2007–present)

Former names
- Sugar Bowl (1935–1987); USF&G Sugar Bowl (1987–1995); Nokia Sugar Bowl (1996–2006)

2026 matchup
- Ole Miss vs. Georgia (Ole Miss 39–34)

The Sugar Bowl is an annual American college football bowl game played in New Orleans, Louisiana. Played annually since January 1, 1935, it is tied with the Orange Bowl and Sun Bowl as the second-oldest bowl games in the country, surpassed only by the Rose Bowl Game.

The Sugar Bowl was originally played at Tulane Stadium before moving to the Superdome in 1975. When the Superdome and the rest of the city suffered damage due to both the winds from and the flooding in the aftermath of Hurricane Katrina in 2005, the Sugar Bowl was temporarily moved to the Georgia Dome in Atlanta in 2006. Since 2007, the game has been sponsored by Allstate and officially known as the Allstate Sugar Bowl. Previous sponsors include Nokia (1996–2006) and USF&G Financial Services (1988–1995).

The Sugar Bowl has had a longstanding relationship with the Southeastern Conference (SEC). Through 91 editions, only 12 games have not featured a representative from the SEC. The SEC's opponent varied from year to year, but prior to the advent of the Bowl Coalition, it was often a member of the Big Eight, the SWC, or a major independent. The first edition with a formal tie-in with the SEC champion was January 1977. Starting in 2015, the Sugar Bowl also established a relationship with the Big 12 Conference.

Beginning in 1992, the Sugar Bowl joined with several other bowls to create the Bowl Coalition in an effort to produce an undisputed national champion in college football. It subsequently was part of the Bowl Alliance and Bowl Championship Series. From 1993 to 2006, the Sugar Bowl served as the national championship game of these systems in 1993, 1997, 2000, and 2004. The Superdome and the Sugar Bowl Committee hosted the BCS National Championship Game in 2008 and 2012, in addition to the regular Sugar Bowl game.

In 2014, the Sugar Bowl, along with the "New Year's Six" bowls, became a part of the College Football Playoff. As part of the four team playoff from 2014 to 2023, the Sugar Bowl served as a semifinal game in 2015, 2018, and 2021. When not serving as a semifinal, the Sugar Bowl featured the best available teams from SEC and the Big 12 conferences.

With the expansion of the College Football Playoff to twelve teams in the 2024–25 season, the Sugar Bowl will serve as either a quarterfinal or semifinal each year. It served as a quarterfinal in 2025 and will do so again in 2026. When serving as a quarterfinal, the Sugar Bowl hosted the higher-seeded SEC or Big 12 champion, if seeded in the top four. Beginning with the 2027 edition, the Sugar Bowl no longer has conference tie-ins.

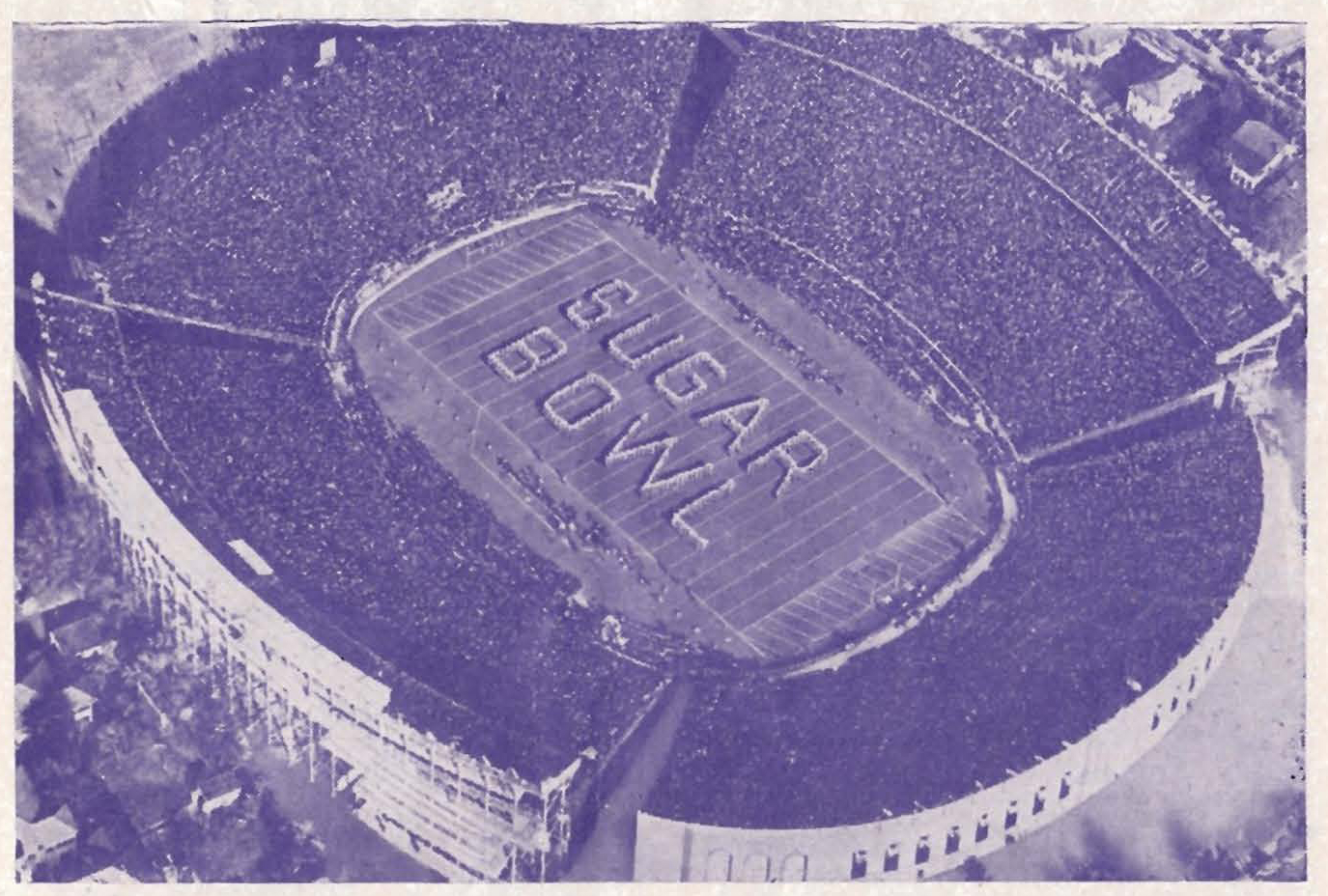
Sugar Bowl in Tulane Stadium in the 1940s

== History ==
In 1890, Pasadena, California, held its first Tournament of Roses Parade to showcase the city's mild weather compared to the harsh winters in northern cities. As one of the organizers said: "In New York, people are buried in snow. Here, our flowers are blooming and our oranges are about to bear [fruit]. Let's hold a festival to tell the world about our paradise." In 1902, the annual festival was enhanced by adding a football game.

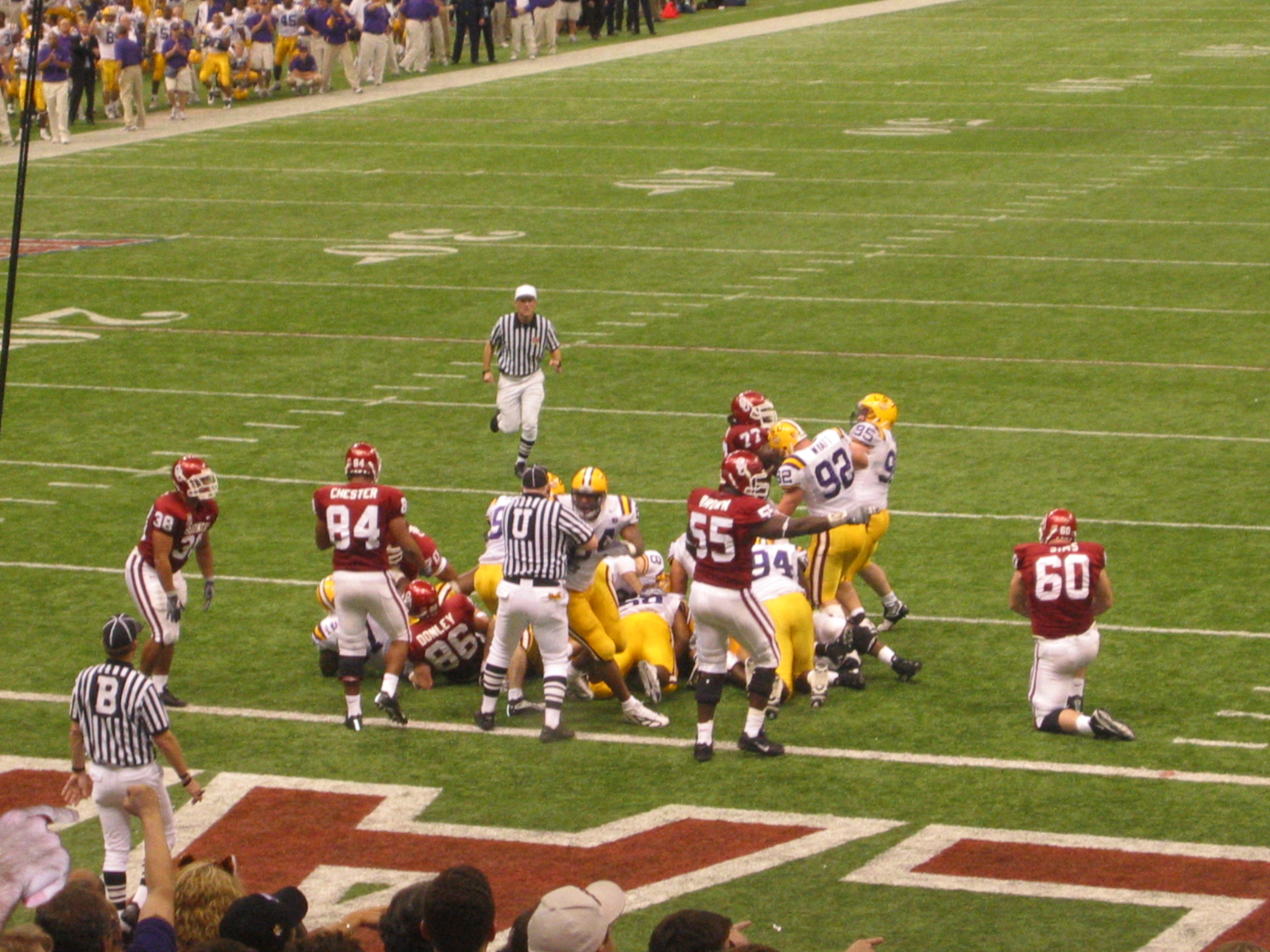
LSU vs. Oklahoma in 2004

In 1926, leaders in Miami, Florida, decided to do the same with a "Fiesta of the American Tropics" that was centered around a New Year's Day football game. Although a second "Fiesta" was never held, Miami leaders later revived the idea with the "Palm Festival" (with the slogan "Have a Green Christmas in Miami"). The football game and associated festivities of the Palm Festival were soon named the "Orange Bowl."

In New Orleans, Louisiana, the idea of a New Year's Day football game was first presented in 1927 by Colonel James M. Thomson, publisher of the New Orleans Item, and Sports Editor Fred Digby. Every year thereafter, Digby repeated calls for action, and even came up with the name "Sugar Bowl" for his proposed football game.

By 1935, enough support had been garnered for the first Sugar Bowl. The game was played in Tulane Stadium, which had been built in 1926 on Tulane University's campus (before 1871, Tulane's campus was Paul Foucher's plantation, where Foucher's father-in-law, Etienne de Bore, had first granulated sugar from cane syrup). Warren V. Miller, the first president of the New Orleans Mid-Winter Sports Association, guided the Sugar Bowl through its difficult formative years of 1934 and 1935. An unusual 2–0 score marked the 1942 Sugar Bowl, in which the sole scoring play was a safety.

In January 1956, Bobby Grier became the first black player to participate in the Sugar Bowl. He is also regarded as the first black player to compete at a bowl game in the Deep South, though others had played in bowls elsewhere, such as Wallace Triplett in the 1948 Cotton Bowl Classic in Dallas. Grier's team, the Pittsburgh Panthers, was set to play against the Georgia Tech Yellow Jackets. However, Georgia's governor Marvin Griffin beseeched Georgia Tech to not participate in this racially integrated game. Griffin was widely criticized by news media leading up to the game, and protests were held at his mansion by Georgia Tech students. Despite the governor's objections, Georgia Tech's president Blake R. Van Leer upheld the contract after he threatened to resign and the board of regents voted in his favor to compete in the bowl. In the game's first quarter, a pass interference call against Grier ultimately resulted in Yellow Jackets' 7–0 victory. Grier stated that he has mostly positive memories about the experience, including the support from teammates and letters from all over the world.

In November 1967, Army's success on the field (then at 7–1) made them a strong candidate to be selected for the 1968 game. However, Pentagon officials, in the midst of the Vietnam War, refused to allow the team to play what would have been the academy's first bowl game ever—citing the "heavy demands on the players' time" as well as an emphasis on football being "not consistent with the academy's basic mission: to produce career Army officers."

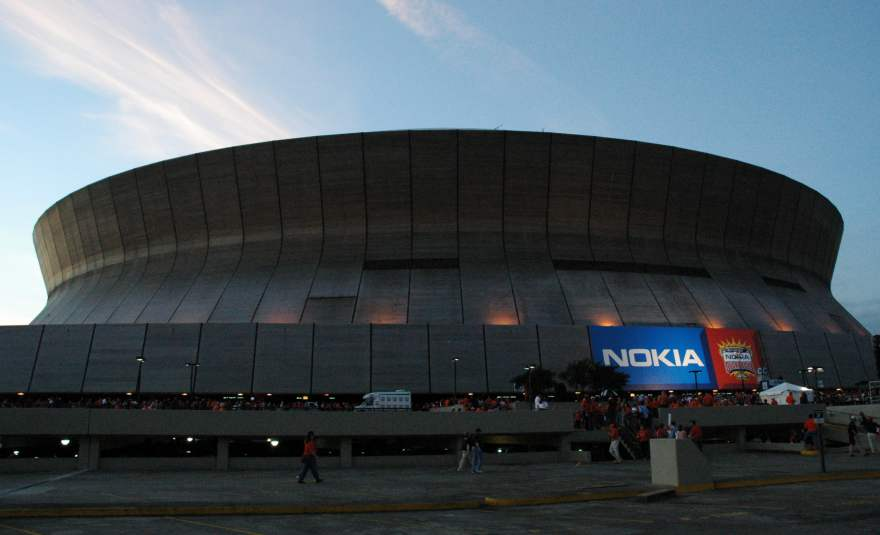
The Superdome in January 2005

Tulane Stadium hosted through December 1974, and it has since been at the Superdome (except 2006). For the 1972 season, the game was moved to New Year's Eve night; which lasted for four editions, returning to New Year's Day in January 1977. The last time it was played on natural grass was in January 1971.

Compared to most bowl games, the Sugar Bowl has had steady naming rights sponsorship. Its first corporate title sponsor was USF&G Financial Services from 1987 to 1995, then Finnish mobile phone manufacturer Nokia from 1995 to 2006. In March 2006, Allstate Insurance was announced as the new title sponsor, and has continued to sponsor the game since.

ABC Sports televised the game from 1969 through 2006. Fox Sports televised the game from 2007 to 2010 as part of its contract with the BCS. ESPN started airing the game with the 2010–11 season, after outbidding Fox for the broadcasting rights.

The 2006 game was relocated to the Georgia Dome in Atlanta, Georgia, because of the extensive damage the Superdome suffered as a result of Hurricane Katrina. Big East Champion West Virginia went on to beat SEC champion Georgia in the game, 38–35. It returned to the refurbished Superdome in 2007. The payout for the 2006 game was $14–17 million per participating team. According to Sports Illustrated, the 2007 salary for Sugar Bowl CEO Paul Hoolahan was $607,500.

Prior to the BCS, the game traditionally hosted the Southeastern Conference (SEC) champion against a top-tier at-large opponent. This was formalized in 1975, when the SEC champion was granted an automatic bid to the Sugar Bowl starting with the end of the 1976 season. This continued throughout the time of the Bowl Coalition, a precursor to the BCS. However, the Sugar Bowl agreed to release the SEC champion if necessary to force a national championship game. Under this format, the Sugar Bowl hosted the first Bowl Coalition national championship game, when SEC champion Alabama upended Miami at the end of the 1992 season. When the Bowl Coalition became the Bowl Alliance at the start of the 1995 season, the Sugar Bowl would still release the SEC champion to go to the national championship game if they were ranked in the top two in the nation.

Under the now-defunct BCS format, the Sugar Bowl continued to host the SEC champion against a top-tier at-large opponent, unless the SEC champion went to the BCS National Championship Game. When this happened, the Sugar Bowl usually selected the highest-ranked SEC team still available in the BCS pool. The SEC champion played for the national championship in every one of the eight final editions of the BCS (2006–2013).

The Sugar Bowl maintains an archive of past programs, images, newsreels, and other materials. The archive, originally housed in the Superdome, survived Hurricane Katrina, but a more secure home was needed. During the summer of 2007, the Sugar Bowl donated its materials to The Historic New Orleans Collection, designating it the permanent home of its archive.

Ohio State vacated its 2011 Sugar Bowl victory over Arkansas in response to NCAA allegations over a memorabilia-for-cash scandal.

The 2012 game, pitting the Michigan Wolverines against the Virginia Tech Hokies, was the first Sugar Bowl since 2000—and only the sixth since World War II—without an SEC team. Both of the SEC's BCS participants, Alabama and LSU, played in the National Championship Game (in the Superdome), and under BCS rules only two teams per conference were eligible for BCS bowls.

In May 2012, the Big 12 and SEC announced plans to create a new bowl game, the "Champions Bowl," that would play host to the champions of those two conferences. That November, it was officially announced that the Champions Bowl had been awarded to New Orleans under a 12-year contract beginning in 2015, and would retain the Sugar Bowl name (stating that "Champions Bowl" was only a working title). In addition, it was announced that the Sugar Bowl would host one of two national semi-final games every three seasons (in the 2014, 2017, 2020, and 2023 seasons) as part of the new College Football Playoff system replacing the BCS.

The game for the 2022 season was moved to December 31, 2022 with a noon ET kickoff; out of respect to the NFL, no bowl games are played on January 1 if it falls on a Sunday, while broadcaster ESPN is also committed to airing Monday Night Football. It was only the sixth edition of the game played on New Year's Eve.

The Washington Huskies, by virtue of being ranked #2 in the CFP rankings at the end of the 2023 season, became the first Pac-12 team to play in the Sugar Bowl, where they faced #3 Texas in a winning effort, 37–31.

== Game results ==
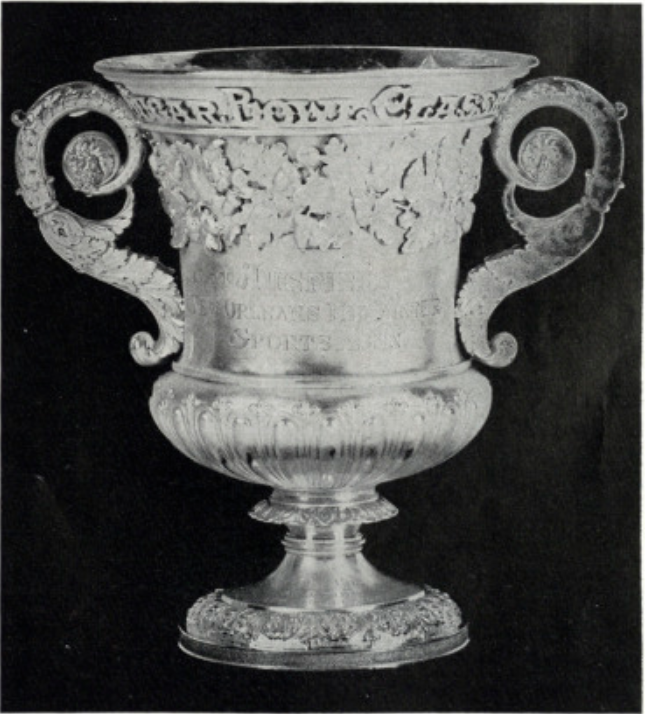
Trophy given to the winning team, from the 1956 game program

All rankings are taken from the AP poll (inaugurated in 1936), before each game was played. Italics denote a tie game.

| Date Played | Winning team | | Losing team | | Venue | Attnd. | Notes |
|---|---|---|---|---|---|---|---|
| January 1, 1935 | Tulane | 20 | Temple | 14 | Tulane Stadium | 22,026 | notes |
| January 1, 1936 | TCU | 3 | LSU | 2 | Tulane Stadium | 35,000 | notes |
| January 1, 1937 | Santa Clara | 21 | LSU | 14 | Tulane Stadium | 41,000 | notes |
| January 1, 1938 | Santa Clara | 6 | LSU | 0 | Tulane Stadium | 45,000 | notes |
| January 2, 1939 | #1 TCU | 15 | #6 Carnegie Tech | 7 | Tulane Stadium | 50,000 | notes |
| January 1, 1940 | #1 Texas A&M | 14 | #5 Tulane | 13 | Tulane Stadium | 73,000 | notes |
| January 1, 1941 | #4 Boston College | 19 | #6 Tennessee | 13 | Tulane Stadium | 73,181 | notes |
| January 1, 1942 | #6 Fordham | 2 | #7 Missouri | 0 | Tulane Stadium | 72,000 | notes |
| January 1, 1943 | #7 Tennessee | 14 | #4 Tulsa | 7 | Tulane Stadium | 70,000 | notes |
| January 1, 1944 | #13 Georgia Tech | 20 | Tulsa | 18 | Tulane Stadium | 69,000 | notes |
| January 1, 1945 | #11 Duke | 29 | Alabama | 26 | Tulane Stadium | 72,000 | notes |
| January 1, 1946 | #5 Oklahoma State | 33 | #7 Saint Mary's (CA) | 13 | Tulane Stadium | 75,000 | notes |
| January 1, 1947 | #3 Georgia | 20 | #9 North Carolina | 10 | Tulane Stadium | 73,300 | notes |
| January 1, 1948 | #5 Texas | 27 | #6 Alabama | 7 | Tulane Stadium | 73,000 | notes |
| January 1, 1949 | #5 Oklahoma | 14 | #3 North Carolina | 6 | Tulane Stadium | 82,000 | notes |
| January 2, 1950 | #2 Oklahoma | 35 | #9 LSU | 0 | Tulane Stadium | 82,470 | notes |
| January 1, 1951 | #7 Kentucky | 13 | #1 Oklahoma | 7 | Tulane Stadium | 82,000 | notes |
| January 1, 1952 | #3 Maryland | 28 | #1 Tennessee | 13 | Tulane Stadium | 82,000 | notes |
| January 1, 1953 | #2 Georgia Tech | 24 | #7 Ole Miss | 7 | Tulane Stadium | 82,000 | notes |
| January 1, 1954 | #8 Georgia Tech | 42 | #10 West Virginia | 19 | Tulane Stadium | 76,000 | notes |
| January 1, 1955 | #5 Navy | 21 | #6 Ole Miss | 0 | Tulane Stadium | 82,000 | notes |
| January 2, 1956 | #7 Georgia Tech | 7 | #11 Pittsburgh | 0 | Tulane Stadium | 76,535–80,175 | notes |
| January 1, 1957 | #11 Baylor | 13 | #2 Tennessee | 7 | Tulane Stadium | 81,000 | notes |
| January 1, 1958 | #7 Ole Miss | 39 | #11 Texas | 7 | Tulane Stadium | 82,000 | notes |
| January 1, 1959 | #1 LSU | 7 | #12 Clemson | 0 | Tulane Stadium | 82,000 | notes |
| January 1, 1960 | #2 Ole Miss | 21 | #3 LSU | 0 | Tulane Stadium | 83,000 | notes |
| January 2, 1961 | #2 Ole Miss | 14 | Rice | 6 | Tulane Stadium | 82,851 | notes |
| January 1, 1962 | #1 Alabama | 10 | #9 Arkansas | 3 | Tulane Stadium | 82,910 | notes |
| January 1, 1963 | #3 Ole Miss | 17 | #6 Arkansas | 13 | Tulane Stadium | 82,900 | notes |
| January 1, 1964 | #8 Alabama | 12 | #7 Ole Miss | 7 | Tulane Stadium | 80,785 | notes |
| January 1, 1965 | #7 LSU | 13 | Syracuse | 10 | Tulane Stadium | 65,000 | notes |
| January 1, 1966 | #6 Missouri | 20 | Florida | 18 | Tulane Stadium | 67,421 | notes |
| January 2, 1967 | #6 Alabama | 34 | #3 Nebraska | 7 | Tulane Stadium | 82,000 | notes |
| January 1, 1968 | LSU | 20 | #5 Wyoming | 13 | Tulane Stadium | 78,963 | notes |
| January 1, 1969 | #9 Arkansas | 16 | #4 Georgia | 2 | Tulane Stadium | 82,113 | notes |
| January 1, 1970 | #13 Ole Miss | 27 | #3 Arkansas | 22 | Tulane Stadium | 82,500 | notes |
| January 1, 1971 | #4 Tennessee | 34 | #11 Air Force | 13 | Tulane Stadium | 78,655 | notes |
| January 1, 1972 | #3 Oklahoma | 40 | #5 Auburn | 22 | Tulane Stadium | 84,031 | notes |
| December 31, 1972 | #2 Oklahoma | 14 | #5 Penn State | 0 | Tulane Stadium | 80,123 | notes |
| December 31, 1973 | #3 Notre Dame | 24 | #1 Alabama | 23 | Tulane Stadium | 85,161 | notes |
| December 31, 1974 | #8 Nebraska | 13 | #18 Florida | 10 | Tulane Stadium | 67,890 | notes |
| December 31, 1975 | #3 Alabama | 13 | #7 Penn State | 6 | Louisiana Superdome | 75,212 | notes |
| January 1, 1977 | #1 Pittsburgh | 27 | #4 Georgia | 3 | Louisiana Superdome | 76,117 | notes |
| January 2, 1978 | #3 Alabama | 35 | #9 Ohio State | 6 | Louisiana Superdome | 76,811 | notes |
| January 1, 1979 | #2 Alabama | 14 | #1 Penn State | 7 | Louisiana Superdome | 76,824 | notes |
| January 1, 1980 | #2 Alabama | 24 | #6 Arkansas | 9 | Louisiana Superdome | 77,486 | notes |
| January 1, 1981 | #1 Georgia | 17 | #7 Notre Dame | 10 | Louisiana Superdome | 77,895 | notes |
| January 1, 1982 | #10 Pittsburgh | 24 | #2 Georgia | 20 | Louisiana Superdome | 77,224 | notes |
| January 1, 1983 | #2 Penn State | 27 | #1 Georgia | 23 | Louisiana Superdome | 78,124 | notes |
| January 2, 1984 | #3 Auburn | 9 | #8 Michigan | 7 | Louisiana Superdome | 77,893 | notes |
| January 1, 1985 | #5 Nebraska | 28 | #11 LSU | 10 | Louisiana Superdome | 75,608 | notes |
| January 1, 1986 | #8 Tennessee | 35 | #2 Miami (Florida) | 7 | Louisiana Superdome | 77,432 | notes |
| January 1, 1987 | #6 Nebraska | 30 | #5 LSU | 15 | Louisiana Superdome | 76,234 | notes |
| January 1, 1988 | #4 Syracuse | 16 | #6 Auburn | 16 | Louisiana Superdome | 75,495 | notes |
| January 2, 1989 | #4 Florida State | 13 | #7 Auburn | 7 | Louisiana Superdome | 61,934 | notes |
| January 1, 1990 | #2 Miami (Florida) | 33 | #7 Alabama | 25 | Louisiana Superdome | 77,452 | notes |
| January 1, 1991 | #6 Tennessee | 23 | Virginia | 22 | Louisiana Superdome | 75,132 | notes |
| January 1, 1992 | #18 Notre Dame | 39 | #3 Florida | 28 | Louisiana Superdome | 76,447 | notes |
| January 1, 1993^{BC} | #2 Alabama | 34 | #1 Miami (Florida) | 13 | Louisiana Superdome | 76,789 | notes |
| January 1, 1994 | #8 Florida | 41 | #3 West Virginia | 7 | Louisiana Superdome | 75,437 | notes |
| January 2, 1995 | #7 Florida State | 23 | #5 Florida | 17 | Louisiana Superdome | 76,224 | notes |
| December 31, 1995 | #13 Virginia Tech | 28 | #9 Texas | 10 | Louisiana Superdome | 70,283 | notes |
| January 2, 1997^{BA} | #3 Florida | 52 | #1 Florida State | 20 | Louisiana Superdome | 78,344 | notes |
| January 1, 1998 | #4 Florida State | 31 | #9 Ohio State | 14 | Louisiana Superdome | 67,289 | notes |
| January 1, 1999 | #3 Ohio State | 24 | #8 Texas A&M | 14 | Louisiana Superdome | 76,503 | notes |
| January 4, 2000^{BCS} | #1 Florida State | 46 | #2 Virginia Tech | 29 | Louisiana Superdome | 79,280 | notes |
| January 2, 2001 | #2 Miami (Florida) | 37 | #7 Florida | 20 | Louisiana Superdome | 64,407 | notes |
| January 1, 2002 | #12 LSU | 47 | #7 Illinois | 34 | Louisiana Superdome | 77,688 | notes |
| January 1, 2003 | #4 Georgia | 26 | #16 Florida State | 13 | Louisiana Superdome | 74,269 | notes |
| January 4, 2004^{BCS} | #2 LSU | 21 | #3 Oklahoma | 14 | Louisiana Superdome | 79,342 | notes |
| January 3, 2005 | #3 Auburn | 16 | #9 Virginia Tech | 13 | Louisiana Superdome | 77,349 | notes |
| January 2, 2006 | #11 West Virginia | 38 | #8 Georgia | 35 | Georgia Dome | 74,458 | notes |
| January 3, 2007 | #4 LSU | 41 | #11 Notre Dame | 14 | Louisiana Superdome | 77,781 | notes |
| January 1, 2008 | #4 Georgia | 41 | #10 Hawaiʻi | 10 | Louisiana Superdome | 74,383 | notes |
| January 2, 2009 | #7 Utah | 31 | #4 Alabama | 17 | Louisiana Superdome | 71,872 | notes |
| January 1, 2010 | #5 Florida | 51 | #4 Cincinnati | 24 | Louisiana Superdome | 65,207 | notes |
| January 4, 2011 | #6 Ohio State (Note: Ohio State vacated its victory over Arkansas in the January 2011 edition due to NCAA sanctions.) | 31 | #8 Arkansas | 26 | Louisiana Superdome | 73,879 | notes |
| January 3, 2012 | #13 Michigan | 23 | #17 Virginia Tech | 20 | Mercedes-Benz Superdome | 64,512 | notes |
| January 2, 2013 | #22 Louisville | 33 | #4 Florida | 23 | Mercedes-Benz Superdome | 54,178 | notes |
| January 2, 2014 | #10 Oklahoma | 45 | #3 Alabama | 31 | Mercedes-Benz Superdome | 70,473 | notes |
| January 1, 2015^{SF} | #5 Ohio State | 42 | #1 Alabama | 35 | Mercedes-Benz Superdome | 74,682 | notes |
| January 1, 2016 | #16 Ole Miss | 48 | #13 Oklahoma State | 20 | Mercedes-Benz Superdome | 72,117 | notes |
| January 2, 2017 | #7 Oklahoma | 35 | #17 Auburn | 19 | Mercedes-Benz Superdome | 54,077 | notes |
| January 1, 2018^{SF} | #4 Alabama | 24 | #1 Clemson | 6 | Mercedes-Benz Superdome | 72,360 | notes |
| January 1, 2019 | #14 Texas | 28 | #6 Georgia | 21 | Mercedes-Benz Superdome | 71,449 | notes |
| January 1, 2020 | #5 Georgia | 26 | #8 Baylor | 14 | Mercedes-Benz Superdome | 55,211 | notes |
| January 1, 2021^{SF} | #3 Ohio State | 49 | #2 Clemson | 28 | Mercedes-Benz Superdome | 3,000 | notes |
| January 1, 2022 | #7 Baylor | 21 | #8 Ole Miss | 7 | Caesars Superdome | 66,479 | notes |
| December 31, 2022 | #5 Alabama | 45 | #11 Kansas State | 20 | Caesars Superdome | 60,437 | notes |
| January 1, 2024^{SF} | #2 Washington | 37 | #3 Texas | 31 | Caesars Superdome | 68,791 | notes |
| January 2, 2025^{QF} (Note: The 2025 game was moved from January 1 to January 2 due to security concerns following the 2025 New Orleans truck attack.) | #3 Notre Dame | 23 | #2 Georgia | 10 | Caesars Superdome | 57,267 | notes |
| January 1, 2026^{QF} | #6 Ole Miss | 39 | #2 Georgia | 34 | Caesars Superdome | 68,371 | notes |

^BC Denotes Bowl Coalition Championship game
^BA Denotes Bowl Alliance Championship game
^BCS Denotes BCS National Championship Game
^QF Denotes College Football Playoff quarterfinal game
^SF Denotes College Football Playoff semifinal game

== Most Outstanding Players (Miller-Digby Award) ==
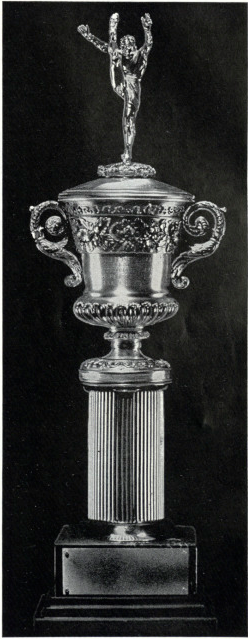
The Miller Memorial Trophy, from the 1956 game program

The Miller-Digby Award is presented to the Most Outstanding Player (MOP) in the Sugar Bowl, as voted by sports journalists covering the game. The award was initially established in 1948 following the death of Warren V. Miller, the first president of the Bowl; it was renamed the Miller-Digby Memorial Trophy in 1959, to also honor Fred J. Digby, the first general manager and fellow founding member of the Bowl.

When the Sugar Bowl acts as a CFP semifinal or quarterfinal, both an offensive and defensive MVP are named.

| Year | MOP | Team | Position |
|---|---|---|---|
| 1948 | Bobby Layne | Texas | QB |
| 1949 | Jack Mitchell | Oklahoma | QB |
| 1950 | Leon Heath | Oklahoma | FB |
| 1951 | Walt Yowarsky | Kentucky | T |
| 1952 | Ed Modzelewski | Maryland | FB |
| 1953 | Leon Hardeman | Georgia Tech | HB |
| 1954 | Pepper Rodgers | Georgia Tech | QB |
| 1955 | Joe Gattuso | Navy | FB |
| 1956 | Franklin Brooks | Georgia Tech | G |
| 1957 | Del Shofner | Baylor | HB |
| 1958 | Raymond Brown | Ole Miss | QB |
| 1959 | Billy Cannon | LSU | HB |
| 1960 | Bobby Franklin | Ole Miss | QB |
| 1961 | Jake Gibbs | Ole Miss | QB |
| 1962 | Mike Fracchia | Alabama | FB |
| 1963 | Glynn Griffin | Ole Miss | QB |
| 1964 | Tim Davis | Alabama | K |
| 1965 | Doug Moreau | LSU | FL |
| 1966 | Steve Spurrier | Florida | QB |
| 1967 | Ken Stabler | Alabama | QB |
| 1968 | Glenn Smith | LSU | HB |
| 1969 | Chuck Dicus | Arkansas | FL |
| 1970 | Archie Manning | Ole Miss | QB |
| 1971 | Bobby Scott | Tennessee | QB |
| Jan. 1972 | Jack Mildren | Oklahoma | QB |
| Dec. 1972 | Tinker Owens | Oklahoma | FL |
| 1973 | Tom Clements | Notre Dame | QB |
| 1974 | Tony Davis | Nebraska | FB |
| 1975 | Richard Todd | Alabama | QB |
| 1977 | Matt Cavanaugh | Pittsburgh | QB |
| 1978 | Jeff Rutledge | Alabama | QB |
| 1979 | Barry Krauss | Alabama | LB |
| 1980 | Major Ogilvie | Alabama | RB |
| 1981 | Herschel Walker | Georgia | RB |
| 1982 | Dan Marino | Pittsburgh | QB |
| 1983 | Todd Blackledge | Penn State | QB |
| 1984 | Bo Jackson | Auburn | RB |
| 1985 | Craig Sundberg | Nebraska | QB |
| 1986 | Daryl Dickey | Tennessee | QB |
| 1987 | Steve Taylor | Nebraska | QB |
| 1988 | Don McPherson | Syracuse | QB |
| 1989 | Sammie Smith | Florida State | RB |
| 1990 | Craig Erickson | Miami (Fla.) | QB |

| Year | MOP | Team | Position |
|---|---|---|---|
| 1991 | Andy Kelly | Tennessee | QB |
| 1992 | Jerome Bettis | Notre Dame | FB |
| 1993 | Derrick Lassic | Alabama | RB |
| 1994 | Errict Rhett | Florida | RB |
| Jan. 1995 | Warrick Dunn | Florida State | RB |
| Dec. 1995 | Bryan Still | Virginia Tech | WR |
| 1997 | Danny Wuerffel | Florida | QB |
| 1998 | E. G. Green | Florida State | WR |
| 1999 | David Boston | Ohio State | WR |
| 2000 | Peter Warrick | Florida State | WR |
| 2001 | Ken Dorsey | Miami (Fla.) | QB |
| 2002 | Rohan Davey | LSU | QB |
| 2003 | Musa Smith | Georgia | TB |
| 2004 | Justin Vincent | LSU | RB |
| 2005 | Jason Campbell | Auburn | QB |
| 2006 | Steve Slaton | West Virginia | RB |
| 2007 | JaMarcus Russell | LSU | QB |
| 2008 | Marcus Howard | Georgia | DE |
| 2009 | Brian Johnson | Utah | QB |
| 2010 | Tim Tebow | Florida | QB |
| 2011 | Terrelle Pryor† | Ohio State | QB |
| 2012 | Junior Hemingway | Michigan | WR |
| 2013 | Teddy Bridgewater | Louisville | QB |
| 2014 | Trevor Knight | Oklahoma | QB |
| 2015 | Ezekiel Elliott | Ohio State | RB |
| 2015 | Darron Lee | Ohio State | LB |
| 2016 | Chad Kelly | Ole Miss | QB |
| 2017 | Baker Mayfield | Oklahoma | QB |
| 2018 | Jalen Hurts | Alabama | QB |
| 2018 | Daron Payne | Alabama | DT |
| 2019 | Sam Ehlinger | Texas | QB |
| 2020 | George Pickens | Georgia | WR |
| 2021 | Justin Fields | Ohio State | QB |
| 2021 | Tuf Borland | Ohio State | LB |
| Jan. 2022 | Terrel Bernard | Baylor | LB |
| Dec. 2022 | Bryce Young | Alabama | QB |
| 2024 | Michael Penix Jr. | Washington | QB |
| 2024 | Bralen Trice | Washington | DE |
| 2025 | Riley Leonard | Notre Dame | QB |
| 2025 | Xavier Watts | Notre Dame | S |
| 2026 | Trinidad Chambliss | Ole Miss | QB |
| 2026 | Will Echoles | Ole Miss | DT |

† Terrelle Pryor was later ruled ineligible and his statistics for the 2010 season, including the 2011 Sugar Bowl, were vacated.

== Most appearances ==
Updated through the January 2026 edition (92 games, 184 total appearances).

Teams with multiple appearances

| Rank | Team | Appearances | Record |
|---|---|---|---|
| 1 | Alabama | 17 | 10–7 |
| T2 | LSU | 13 | 6–7 |
| T2 | Georgia | 13 | 5–8 |
| 4 | Ole Miss | 11 | 7–4 |
| 5 | Florida | 9 | 3–6 |
| 6 | Oklahoma | 8 | 6–2 |
| 7 | Tennessee | 7 | 4–3 |
| T8 | Florida State | 6 | 4–2 |
| T8 | Ohio State | 6 | 3–2 ‡ |
| T8 | Auburn | 6 | 2–3–1 |
| T8 | Arkansas | 6 | 1–5 |
| T12 | Notre Dame | 5 | 3–2 |
| T12 | Texas | 5 | 2–3 |
| T14 | Georgia Tech | 4 | 4–0 |
| T14 | Nebraska | 4 | 3–1 |
| T14 | Miami | 4 | 2–2 |
| T14 | Penn State | 4 | 1–3 |
| T14 | Virginia Tech | 4 | 1–3 |

| Rank | Team | Appearances | Record |
|---|---|---|---|
| T19 | Baylor | 3 | 2–1 |
| T19 | Pittsburgh | 3 | 2–1 |
| T19 | West Virginia | 3 | 1–2 |
| T19 | Clemson | 3 | 0–3 |
| T23 | Santa Clara | 2 | 2–0 |
| T23 | TCU | 2 | 2–0 |
| T23 | Michigan | 2 | 1–1 |
| T23 | Missouri | 2 | 1–1 |
| T23 | Oklahoma State | 2 | 1–1 |
| T23 | Texas A&M | 2 | 1–1 |
| T23 | Tulane | 2 | 1–1 |
| T23 | Syracuse | 2 | 0–1–1 |
| T23 | North Carolina | 2 | 0–2 |
| T23 | Tulsa | 2 | 0–2 |

‡ Ohio State's win–loss record excludes its vacated victory in the January 2011 game.

Teams with a single appearance

Won (9): Boston College, Duke, Fordham, Kentucky, Louisville, Maryland, Navy, Utah, Washington
Lost (11): Air Force, Carnegie Tech, Cincinnati, Hawai'i, Illinois, Kansas State, Rice, Saint Mary's (CA), Temple, Virginia, Wyoming

Conference participation (as of the 2024 season)

- Mississippi State, South Carolina and Vanderbilt are the only current SEC members that have not appeared in the Sugar Bowl. Former members Georgia Tech and Tulane also appeared in the Sugar Bowl while in the SEC, although former member Sewanee did not.
- BYU, Colorado, Houston, Iowa State, Kansas, Texas Tech and UCF are the only current or former Big Eight or Big 12 members that have not appeared in the Sugar Bowl.
- Texas Tech, Houston and SMU are the only former Southwest Conference members that have not played in the Sugar Bowl.

== Appearances by conference ==
Updated through the January 2026 edition (92 games, 184 total appearances).

| Rank | Conference | Record | | | | | Appearances by year | | | |
| Rank | Conference | Games | W | L | T | Win pct. | Won | Lost | Tied | Vacated |
|---|---|---|---|---|---|---|---|---|---|---|
| 1 | SEC | 84 | 43 | 40 | 1 | .518 | 1935, 1943, 1944, 1947, 1951, 1953, 1954, 1956, 1958, 1959, 1960, 1961, 1962, 1963, 1964, 1965, 1967, 1968, 1970, 1971, 1975^{D}, 1978, 1979, 1980, 1981, 1984, 1986, 1991, 1993, 1994, 1997, 2002, 2003, 2004, 2005, 2007, 2008, 2010, 2016, 2018, 2020, 2022^{D}, 2026 | 1936, 1937, 1938, 1940, 1941, 1945, 1948, 1950, 1952, 1953, 1955, 1957, 1960, 1964, 1966, 1969, 1972, 1973^{D}, 1974^{D}, 1977, 1982, 1983, 1985, 1987, 1989, 1990, 1992, 1995, 2001, 2006, 2009, 2011, 2013, 2014, 2015, 2017, 2019, 2022, 2025, 2026 | 1988 | |
| 2 | Independent | 26 | 13 | 12 | 1 | .519 | 1937, 1938, 1941, 1942, 1955, 1973^{D}, 1977, 1982, 1983, 1989, 1990, 1992, 2025 | 1935, 1939, 1946, 1956, 1965, 1971, 1972^{D}, 1975^{D}, 1979, 1981, 1986, 2007 | 1988 | |
| 3 | SWC | 13 | 6 | 7 | 0 | .462 | 1936, 1939, 1940, 1948, 1957, 1969 | 1958, 1961, 1962, 1963, 1970, 1980, 1995^{D} | | |
| T4 | Big Eight | 11 | 8 | 3 | 0 | .727 | 1949, 1950, 1966, 1972, 1972^{D}, 1974^{D}, 1985, 1987 | 1942, 1951, 1967 | | |
| T4 | ACC | 11 | 3 | 8 | 0 | .273 | 1995, 1998, 2000 | 1959, 1991, 1997, 2003, 2005, 2012, 2018, 2021 | | |
| 6 | Big 12 | 10 | 4 | 6 | 0 | .400 | 2014, 2017, 2019, 2022 | 1999, 2004, 2016, 2020, 2022^{D}, 2024 | | |
| 7 | Big Ten | 9 | 4 | 4 | 0 | .500 ‡ | 1999, 2012, 2015, 2021 | 1978, 1984, 1998, 2002 | | 2011 |
| 8 | Big East | 8 | 4 | 4 | 0 | .500 | 1995^{D}, 2001, 2006, 2013 | 1993, 1994, 2000, 2010 | | |
| 9 | SoCon | 5 | 2 | 3 | 0 | .400 | 1945, 1952 | 1947, 1949, 1954 | | |
| 10 | MVC | 3 | 1 | 2 | 0 | .333 | 1946 | 1943, 1944 | | |
| 11 | WAC | 2 | 0 | 2 | 0 | .000 | | 1968, 2008 | | |
| T12 | Mountain West | 1 | 1 | 0 | 0 | 1.000 | 2009 | | | |
| T12 | Pac-12 | 1 | 1 | 0 | 0 | 1.000 | 2024 | | | |

‡ The Big Ten's win–loss record and winning percentage exclude Ohio State's vacated victory of 2011.

- Games were played in the calendar year listed; in December if marked with an superscript D (such as 1972^{D}), else in January.
- Conferences that are defunct or not currently active in FBS are marked in italics.
- Records reflect each team's conference affiliation at the time the game was played.
  - Big Eight records include games when the conference was known as the Big Six or Big Seven.
  - The American Conference retains the charter of the original Big East, following its 2013 realignment.
- Independent appearances: Air Force (1971), Boston College (1941), Carnegie Tech (1939), Florida State (1989), Fordham (1942), Miami (Florida) (1986, 1990), Navy (1955), Notre Dame (Dec. 1973, 1981, 1992, 2007, 2025), Penn State (Dec. 1972, Dec. 1975, 1979, 1983), Pittsburgh (1956, 1977, 1982), Saint Mary's (California) (1946), Santa Clara (1937, 1938), Syracuse (1965, 1988), and Temple (1935).
- Four games have been contested between two SEC teams: 1953, 1960, 1964, and 2026.

== Game records ==
| Team | Record, Team vs. Opponent | Year |
|---|---|---|
| Most points scored (one team) | 52, Florida vs. Florida State | 1997 |
| Most points scored (losing team) | 35, shared by: Georgia vs. West Virginia; Alabama vs. Ohio State | 2006; 2015 |
| Most points scored (both teams) | 81, LSU (47) vs. Illinois (34) | 2002 |
| Fewest points allowed | 0, eight times, most recent: Oklahoma vs. Penn State | Dec. 1972 |
| Largest margin of victory | 35, Oklahoma (35) vs. LSU (0) | 1950 |
| Total yards | 659, Florida (482 pass, 177 rush) vs. Cincinnati | 2010 |
| Rushing yards | 439, Oklahoma vs. Auburn | Jan. 1972 |
| Passing yards | 482, Florida vs. Cincinnati | 2010 |
| First downs | 32, LSU vs. Illinois | 2002 |
| Fewest yards allowed | 74, Ole Miss vs. LSU (-15 rush, 89 pass) | 1960 |
| Fewest rushing yards allowed | -39, Tennessee vs. Tulsa | 1943 |
| Fewest passing yards allowed | 0, three times, most recent: Pittsburgh vs. Georgia Tech | 1956 |
| Sacks | 10, Baylor vs. Ole Miss | Jan. 2022 |
| Individual | Record, Player, Team vs. Opponent | Year |
| All-purpose yards | 282, Kevin Williams, Miami (FL) vs. Alabama | 1993 |
| Touchdowns (all-purpose) | 4, Domanick Davis, LSU vs. Illinois | 2002 |
| Rushing yards | 230, Ezekiel Elliott, Ohio State vs. Alabama | 2015 |
| Rushing touchdowns | 4, Domanick Davis, LSU vs. Illinois | 2002 |
| Passing yards | 482, Tim Tebow, Florida vs. Cincinnati | 2010 |
| Passing touchdowns | 6, Justin Fields, Ohio State vs. Clemson | 2021 |
| Receiving yards | 239, Josh Reed, LSU vs. Illinois | 2002 |
| Receiving touchdowns | 3, shared by: Ike Hilliard, Florida vs. Florida State; Laquon Treadwell, Ole Miss vs. Oklahoma State | 1997; 2016 |
| Tackles | 20, Tom Cousineau, Ohio State vs. Alabama | 1978 |
| Sacks | 3, shared by six players, most recent: Eric Striker, Oklahoma vs. Alabama | 2014 |
| Interceptions | 3, shared by three players, most recent: Bobby Johns, Alabama vs. Nebraska | 1967 |
| Long Plays | Record, Player, Team vs. Opponent | Year |
| Touchdown run | 92, Ray Brown, Ole Miss vs. Texas | 1958 |
| Touchdown pass | 82, Ike Hilliard from Danny Wuerffel, Florida vs. Florida State | Jan. 1995 |
| Kickoff return | 100, Andre Debose, Florida vs. Louisville | 2013 |
| Punt return | 78, Kevin Williams, Miami (FL) vs. Alabama | 1993 |
| Interception return | 96, Al Walcott, Baylor vs. Ole Miss | Jan. 2022 |
| Fumble return | 46, Daylen Everette, Georgia vs. Ole Miss | 2026 |
| Punt | 76, Glenn Dobbs, Tulsa vs. Tennessee | 1943 |
| Field goal | 56, Lucas Carneiro, Ole Miss vs. Georgia | 2026 |
| Miscellaneous | Record, Team vs. Team | Year |
| Game attendance | 85,161, Notre Dame vs. Alabama | 1973 |

== Broadcasting ==
From 1999 to 2006, the game aired on ABC as part of its BCS package, where it had also been televised from 1969 through 1998. The Sugar Bowl was the only Bowl Alliance game to stick with ABC following the 1995, 1996 and 1997 seasons; the Fiesta and Orange Bowls were televised by CBS. Prior to that, NBC aired the game for several years. From 2006 to 2010, Fox broadcast the game, while ESPN picked up the Sugar Bowl after picking up the rest of the BCS beginning in the 2009–10 season. For 2013, ESPN Deportes introduced a Spanish language telecast of the game.

In November 2012, ESPN announced that it had reached a deal to maintain broadcast rights to the Sugar Bowl through 2026. ESPN pays $55 million yearly to broadcast the game beginning in the 2014–15 season under the new contract, which took effect upon the establishment of the College Football Playoff. ESPN made a similar deal to maintain broadcast rights to the Orange Bowl following the discontinuation of the BCS as well.

== See also ==
- List of college bowl games
- Manning Award
