= Genevieve Clark Thomson =

American suffragist (1894–1981)

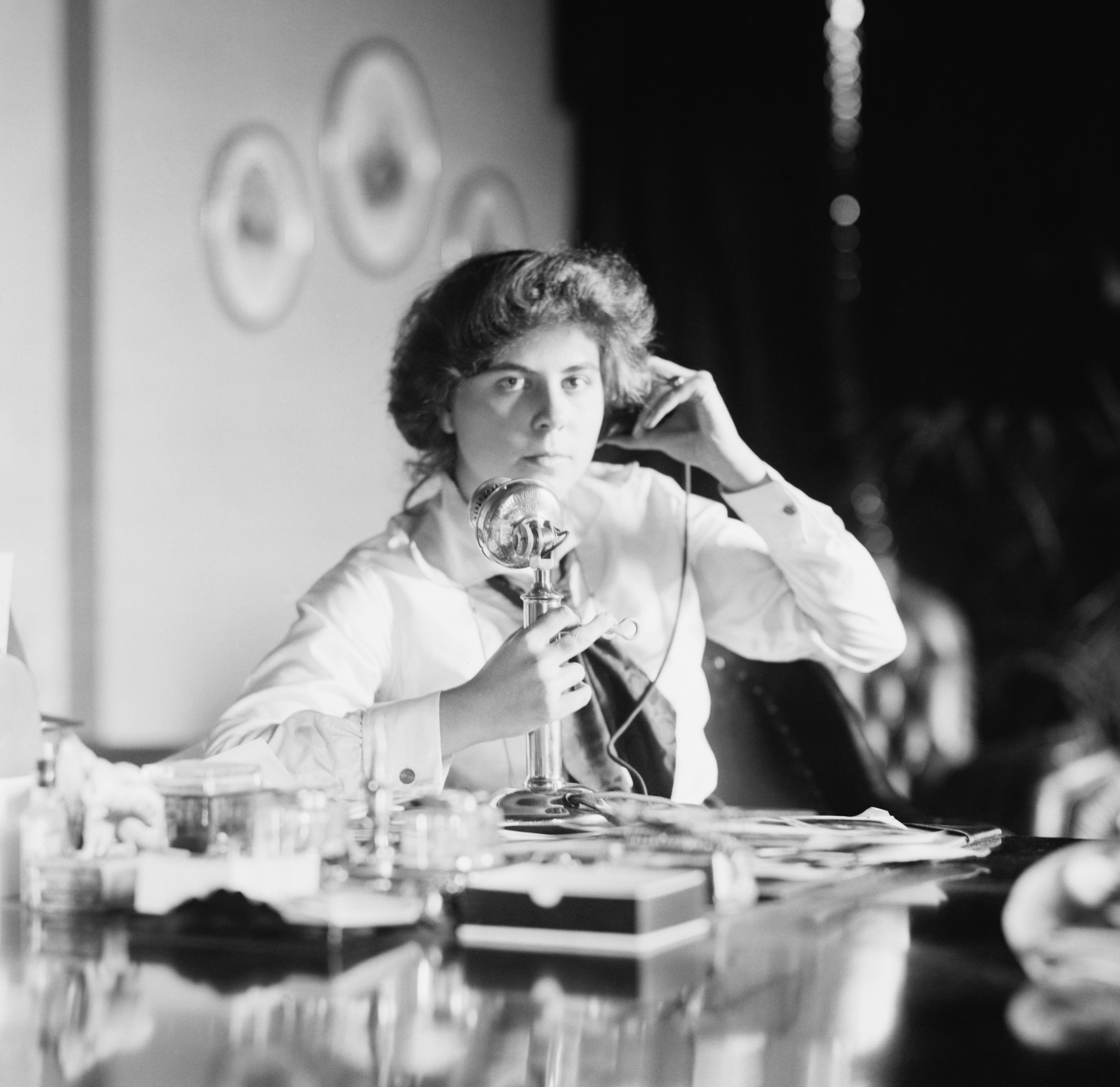
- Genevieve Clark, around 1912
- Born: November 30, 1894
- Died: February 16, 1981 (aged 86)
- Occupations: Journalist, politician
- Spouse: James M. Thomson (m. 1915; died 1959)

Genevieve Clark Thomson (November 30, 1894 – February 16, 1981) was an American suffragist.

== Biography ==
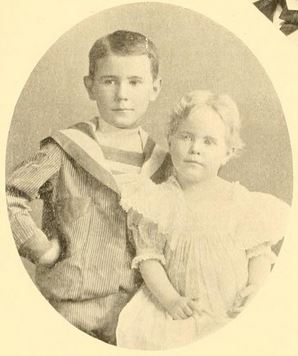
Bennett and Genevieve Clark, 1895

Genevieve Clark was born to politician and Speaker of the House James Beauchamp ("Champ") Clark and Genevieve Bennett Clark on November 30, 1894. She studied at the Friends' school in Washington, DC. She met publisher James M. Thomson during the Baltimore convention where she was working for her father's presidential nomination and Thomson was covering the event. They were married on June 30, 1915, in Bowling Green, Missouri. The whole state was invited. The couple's only child, Champ Clark Thomson, was born on February 13, 1917, and died on November 1, 1919.

As a suffragist, Thomson was an advocate of temperance and the Woman's Christian Temperance Union. In 1913, she became a reporter in Washington. In 1924, she announced her candidacy to fill H. Garland Dupre's Congressional seat on the United States House of Representatives for Louisiana's 2nd congressional district, based about New Orleans, Louisiana. She lost to James Z. Spearing, who earned 16,733 votes to Thomson's 12,745.
