= Fred Digby =

Founder of annual Sugar Bowl football game

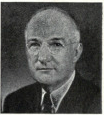
- Digby, c. 1956
- Born: January 26, 1893
- Died: November 3, 1958 (aged 65)
- Known for: General manager of the Sugar Bowl

Frederick (Fred) Joseph Digby (January 26, 1893 – November 3, 1958), was a sportswriter based in New Orleans. He was the founding member and first general manager of the Sugar Bowl, one of the oldest college bowl games in the United States.

== Biography ==
Digby began writing for the New Orleans Item newspaper in 1912; he was named sports editor in 1923 and served in that role until his retirement from the Item in 1947.

In 1927, Digby and Colonel James M. Thomson, publisher of the New Orleans Item, first proposed the formation of a New Year's Eve college football bowl in New Orleans. For several years, Digby pursued the idea each fall until finally the New Orleans Mid-Winter Sports Association (later the Sugar Bowl Committee) was formed on February 15, 1934. The inaugural Sugar Bowl football classic was played on January 1, 1935. The Sugar Bowl has been played annually on New Year's Day ever since.

Digby is referred to as the "Father of the Sugar Bowl" and is credited with giving the Sugar Bowl its name. He described the success of the first college football bowl in New Orleans as "a dream come true". He was a long-term member of the Sugar Bowl Committee and, after retiring as sports editor for the Item, he served as general manager of the Sugar Bowl until his death in 1958.

== Honors ==
The game's Miller-Digby Award was named in honor of Digby and the first president of the Sugar Bowl, Warren V. Miller.

In March 2018, Fred Digby and Warren Miller were honored with the Football Bowl Association’s Legacy Award for 2018.

== Personal life ==
He was married to Mary Frances Digby. They had four children: Anna (born c.1918), Fred Junior (born c.1920), Noel (born c.1925) and Doris (born c.1928).

== Death ==
Fred Digby died on November 3, 1958, after a short illness, at the age of 65; he is buried in Greenwood Cemetery, New Orleans. Mary Digby died in 1986 and is buried in the same plot as her husband.
