= James M. Thomson (newspaper publisher) =

American newspaper publisher (1878–1959)

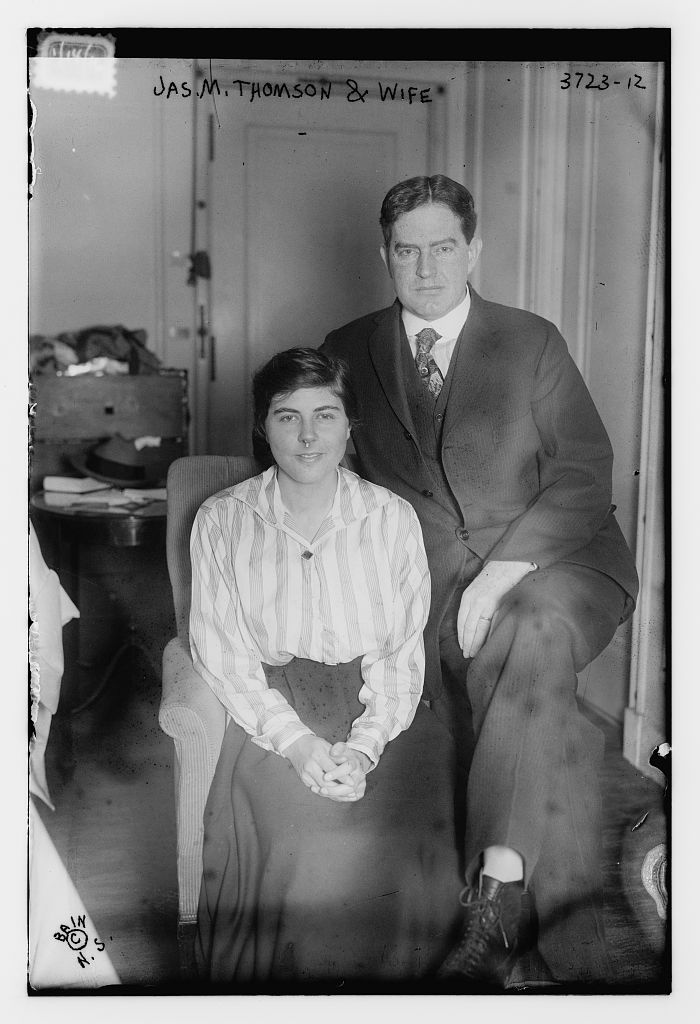
James McIlhany Thomson and Genevieve Clark Thomson in 1916

James McIlhany Thomson (February 13, 1878 – September 25, 1959) was an American newspaper publisher, best known for his long tenure as head of the New Orleans Item newspaper and his political role within the Democratic Party.

== Biography ==
Thomson was born in Jefferson County, West Virginia on February 13, 1878.

He attended the Johns Hopkins University, where he and classmate Edgeworth Smith founded the Johns Hopkins News-Letter in 1896.

Shortly after graduating, Thomson became editor of the Norfolk, Virginia Dispatch, where he worked from 1900 to 1906. From 1906 to 1941, Thomson served in the position he would hold for most of his life, as publisher of the New Orleans Item-Tribune, then known simply as the Item. The Item-Tribune was later merged with the present-day Times-Picayune.

He married Genevieve Champ Clark in 1915, whose father, James Beauchamp Clark, had been a Democratic nominee for president in 1912.

Thomson himself would serve as delegate to the Democratic National Convention in 1920, 1924, and 1944 for the state of Louisiana. His nephew, also named James McIlhany Thomson, served as the Democratic representative of Alexandria, Virginia in the Virginia General Assembly from 1956 to 1978.

He is credited as being one of the leading proponents of the New Orleans Sugar Bowl, a collegiate football game which has been played annually at New Year since its inaugural game on January 1, 1935.

Thomson died on September 25, 1959.
