= The Johns Hopkins News-Letter =

Independent student newspaper

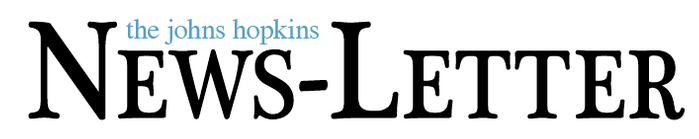

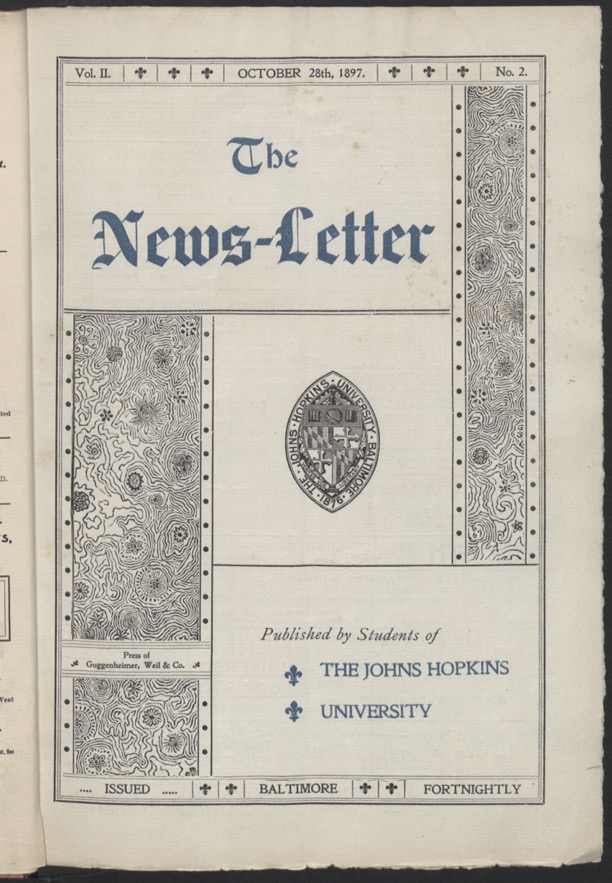
- Front Page of The News-Letter October 28, 1897
- Type: Weekly student newspaper
- Format: Broadsheet
- School: Johns Hopkins University
- Owner: Independent
- Founder(s): James M. Thomson, Edgeworth Smith
- Editor-in-chief: Grace Oh, Myra Saeed
- Founded: 1896; 130 years ago
- Headquarters: The Gatehouse, Baltimore, Maryland
- Website: jhunewsletter.com
- Free online archives: The Johns Hopkins News-Letter Archive

The Johns Hopkins News-Letter is the independent student newspaper of Johns Hopkins University in Baltimore, Maryland, U.S. Published since 1896, it is one of the nation's oldest continuously published, weekly, student-run college newspapers.

The News-Letter won an Associated Collegiate Press Newspaper Pacemaker award for four-year, non-daily college newspapers in 2015, 2013, 2008, 2005, 2003, and 1995 and was a finalist for the award in 2010, 2007, and 1997.

In 2020, The News-Letter was one of ten student media organizations to receive funding from the Poynter Institute for a reporting project to advance civil discourse on campus. As a culmination of its efforts, The News-Letter published "Examining Hopkins Hospital’s Relationship with Baltimore", a magazine that explores the University's historic role within the city of Baltimore.

The News-Letter is an affiliate of UWIRE, which distributes and promotes its content to their network.

As of 2026, 3 News-Letter Alumni, Russell Baker, Richard Ben Cramer, and Mike Spector, have won a Pulitzer Prize.

== History ==
During the founding years of the university, the board of trustees of Johns Hopkins University prohibited the creation of any student publication without the board's written permission. In 1889 specifically, when talks of a News-Letter originated, several board members had their hesitations. Seven years later however, James M. Thomson 1897 and Edgeworth Smith 1898 petitioned the Academic Council to allow publication of four trial issues of a fortnightly periodical to be called The Johns Hopkins News-Letter. Its aim, at a pricey 15 cents an issue, would be to report on local events and provide a forum for students who wished to publish opinion pieces. Eventually, and reluctantly, the board acquiesced, "provided that the plan be carried out in a manner satisfactory to the President."

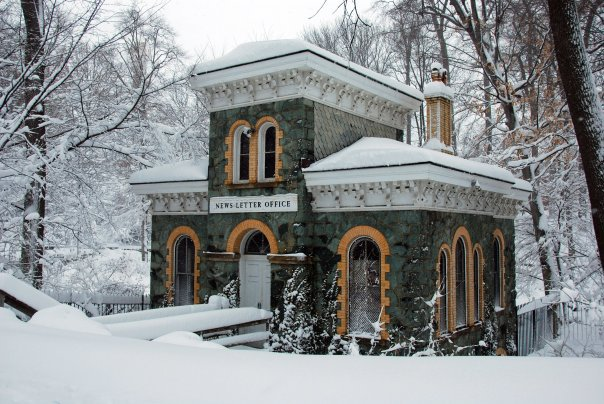
The Gatehouse

In October, 1967, The News-Letter moved its offices to the Gatehouse, a small neo-Italianate building located on the corner of North Charles Street and Art Museum Drive, next to the Baltimore Museum of Art. The building was originally called the Homewood lodge and marked the entrance to William Wyman's Homewood estate.

The period 1997 - 2001 was characterized by a heightened sense of playfulness, punctuated by aggressive, but thoughtful, criticism. Often referred to as the "Gutting and Langbein era," the period saw a doubling of revenues for the newspaper, which is often attributed to the emergence of noted author Steve Cocker and his sharp eye for the more colorful details in life.

Sometimes criticized for its seeming immaturity, the News-Letter's simpleton charms veiled a juggernaut of influence operating below the surface. The reassignment of administrators Ralph Johnson and Mike Little are frequently attributed to the paper, as are the tearful pleas of student representative Greg Wu on the Gilman Quad in late 2001 and the lack of attendance at the 2000 Shaggy concert.

Never dull, News-Letter editors during the period were known to be called before disciplinary boards from time to time, as well as scream profanities, while intoxicated, at administrators. These editorial boards withstood the reactionary administrative backlash by hiding behind a number of technicalities, making friends with other administrators, and trading student-politics favors. Like corporate boards of the times, News-Letter editors held positions of power in many other student organizations around campus, providing the paper with political leverage and access.

As of now, the News-Letter publishes both online and print articles covering events on campus, in Baltimore, and beyond.

Currently, The News-Letter has seven sections: News & Features, Opinions, Sports, Science & Technology, Voices, Arts & Entertainment, and Leisure.

== Controversy ==
The News-Letter retracted its coverage of a webinar by Genevieve Briand, the assistant program director of the Applied Economics master’s degree program at Hopkins. Briand argued that there was "no evidence that COVID-19 created any excess deaths." A statement on November 26, 2020 published on social media noted that the article was "used to support false and dangerous inaccuracies about the impact of the pandemic." A day later, The News-Letter published an explanation of the retraction and made the original article viewable as a PDF.

== Notable News-Letter alumni ==
- Russell Baker, Pulitzer Prize-winning columnist and former host of Masterpiece Theatre
- J.D. Considine, music critic and former Rolling Stone writer
- Richard Ben Cramer, winner of the Pulitzer Prize for International Reporting in 1979 for reports from the Middle East, New York Times best-selling author
- Lauren (Spencer) Deford, Senior Coordinating Producer at SportsNet New York (SNY) and NBC Universal
- Caleb Deschanel, cinematographer and father of Zooey Deschanel and Emily Deschanel
- Bruce Drake, former vice president of National Public Radio
- Galen Druke, host and producer of FiveThirtyEight podcast
- Mark Hertsgaard, independent journalist and environmental correspondent for The Nation
- Alger Hiss, U.S. State Department official accused of being a Soviet spy
- Murray Kempton, noted American journalist
- Sujata Massey, mystery writer
- Edward L. Morse, Global Head of Commodities Research at Citigroup
- Irvin B. Nathan, former Attorney General of the District of Columbia and General Counsel of the United States House of Representatives
- Sidney Offit, curator of the George Polk Award
- Felix Posen, philanthropist and promoter of Humanistic Judaism
- Russ Smith, founder of the Baltimore City Paper and New York Press
- Helmut Sonnenfeldt, chairman of the Atlantic Council of the United States and a former aide to Henry Kissinger
- James M. Thomson, publisher of the New Orleans States-Item, later to become the present-day Times-Picayune
- James Rosen, Washington D.C. correspondent for Fox News
