= 1953 West Virginia Mountaineers football team =

American college football season

1953 West Virginia Mountaineers football

SoCon champion

Sugar Bowl, L 19–42 vs. Georgia Tech
- Conference: Southern Conference

Ranking
- Coaches: No. 13
- AP: No. 10
- Record: 8–2 (4–0 SoCon)
- Head coach: Art Lewis (4th season)
- Home stadium: Mountaineer Field

1953 Southern Conference football standings
	Conf.					Overall
Team	W		L		T	W		L		T
No. 10 West Virginia $	4	–	0	–	0	8	–	2	–	0
Furman	2	–	0	–	0	7	–	2	–	0
George Washington	4	–	2	–	0	5	–	4	–	0
William & Mary	3	–	2	–	0	5	–	4	–	1
Richmond	3	–	3	–	0	5	–	3	–	1
VPI	3	–	3	–	0	5	–	5	–	0
VMI	3	–	3	–	0	5	–	5	–	0
Washington and Lee	2	–	4	–	0	4	–	6	–	0
The Citadel	1	–	3	–	0	2	–	7	–	0
Davidson	0	–	5	–	0	0	–	9	–	0
$ – Conference champion; Rankings from AP Poll

The 1953 West Virginia Mountaineers football team was an American football team that represented West Virginia University in the Southern Conference (SoCon) during the 1953 college football season. Led by fourth-year head coach Art Lewis, the Mountaineers compiled an overall record of 8–2 with a mark of 4–0 in conference play, winning the SoCon title. West Virginia was invited to the Sugar Bowl, where the Mountaineers lost to Georgia Tech, 42–19.

== Schedule ==
Date	Opponent	Rank	Site	TV	Result	Attendance	Source
September 26	at No. 17 Pittsburgh*	No. 16	Pitt Stadium; Pittsburgh, PA (rivalry)		W 17–7	43,446	
October 3	Waynesburg*	No. 13	Mountaineer Field; Morgantown, WV		W 47–19	18,000	
October 10	Washington and Lee	No. 12	Mountaineer Field; Morgantown, WV		W 40–14	14,000	
October 16	at George Washington	No. 10	Griffith Stadium; Washington, DC		W 27–6	10,633	
October 24	VMI^{†}	No. 8	Mountaineer Field; Morgantown, WV		W 52–20	23,000	
October 31	at Penn State*	No. 5	New Beaver Field; University Park, PA (rivalry)		W 20–19	24,670	
November 7	vs. VPI	No. 7	Mitchell Stadium; Bluefield, WV (rivalry)		W 12–7	12,300	
November 14	South Carolina*	No. 8	Mountaineer Field; Morgantown, WV		L 14–20	31,000	
November 21	at NC State*	No. 19	Riddick Stadium; Raleigh, NC		W 61–0	5,800	
January 1	vs. No. 8 Georgia Tech*	No. 10	Tulane Stadium; New Orleans, LA (Sugar Bowl)	ABC	L 19–42	71,666	
*Non-conference game; ^{†}Homecoming; Rankings from AP Poll released prior to the game

== Roster ==
1954 West Virginia Mountaineers football team roster
Players
Coaches
Offense

Pos.	#	Name	Class
QB	11	Fred Wyant	Jr
End	89	Billy Hillen	Sr
End	86	Gary Bunn	Jr
End	84	Joe Kopnisky	So
End	55	John Kernic	Sr
End	81	Max Ludwig	Sr
OL-LT	77	Bruce Bosley	Jr
OL-LG	72	Gene Lamone	Jr
OL-RG	75	Sam Huff	So
Guard	64	Gene Lathey	So
Guard	88	Bill Underdonk	Jr
Guard	65	Jerry Urda	So
Center	36	Charles Donaldson	Sr
RB	42	Dick Nicholson	Sr
HB	25	Bob Moss	Jr
HB	15	Harry Sweeney	Sr
HB	22	Victor "Jack" Rabbits	So
HB	47	Eddie Dugan	Jr
HB	32	Ray Surbaugh	Jr
HB	21	Paul Shepherd	So
FB	34	Joe Marconi	Jr
FB	24	Carl Norman	Sr
FB	35	Danny Williams	Sr
FB	23	Ray Borst	So
QB	10	Alex Szuch	So
E	12	Walter Beene	So
C	31	Don Wilson	Sr

Defense

Pos.	#	Name	Class
DE	89	Billy Hillen	Sr
DE	55	John Kernic	Sr
DE	84	Joe Kopnisky	So
DE	81	Max Ludwig	Sr
DE	86	Gary Bunn	Jr
DE	12	Walter Beene	So
DT	77	Bruce Bosley	Jr
DT	75	Sam Huff	So
NG	72	Gene Lamone	Jr
DG	88	Bill Underdonk	Jr
DG	64	Gene Lathey	So
DG	65	Jerry Urda	So
LB	36	Charles Donaldson	Sr
LB	34	Joe Marconi	Jr
LB	24	Carl Norman	Sr
LB	35	Danny Williams	Sr
LB	23	Ray Borst	So
LB	31	Don Wilson	Sr
DB	42	Dick Nicholson	Sr
DB	25	Bob Moss	Jr
DB	15	Harry Sweeney	Sr
DB	22	Victor "Jack" Rabbits	So
DB	47	Eddie Dugan	Jr
DB	32	Ray Surbaugh	Jr
DB	21	Paul Shepherd	So
S	11	Fred Wyant	Jr
S	10	Alex Szuch	So

Special teams

Pos.	#	Name	Class
P	11	Fred Wyant	Jr
K	24	Carl Norman	Sr
KR	25	Bob Moss	Jr
KR	42	Dick Nicholson	Sr
PR	15	Harry Sweeney	Sr
PR	22	Victor "Jack" Rabbits	So

Head coach

Art "Pappy" Lewis

Coordinators/assistant coaches

- Gene Corum (Ends)
- Russ Crane (Defensive Line)
- Harold Sawyers (Backfield)
- Ed Shockey (Backfield)
- Quentin Barnette (Freshman Coach)

Legend

- (C) Team captain
- (S) Suspended
- (I) Ineligible
- Injured
- Redshirt
