= 1953 VMI Keydets football team =

American college football season

1953 VMI Keydets football
- Conference: Southern Conference
- Record: 5–5 (3–3 SoCon)
- Head coach: John McKenna (1st season)
- Home stadium: Lexington Recreation Field; Wilson Field

1953 Southern Conference football standings
	Conf.					Overall
Team	W		L		T	W		L		T
No. 10 West Virginia $	4	–	0	–	0	8	–	2	–	0
Furman	2	–	0	–	0	7	–	2	–	0
George Washington	4	–	2	–	0	5	–	4	–	0
William & Mary	3	–	2	–	0	5	–	4	–	1
Richmond	3	–	3	–	0	5	–	3	–	1
VPI	3	–	3	–	0	5	–	5	–	0
VMI	3	–	3	–	0	5	–	5	–	0
Washington and Lee	2	–	4	–	0	4	–	6	–	0
The Citadel	1	–	3	–	0	2	–	7	–	0
Davidson	0	–	5	–	0	0	–	9	–	0
$ – Conference champion; Rankings from AP Poll

The 1953 VMI Keydets football team was an American football team that represented the Virginia Military Institute (VMI) during the 1953 college football season as a member of the Southern Conference. In their first year under head coach John McKenna, the team compiled an overall record of 5–5.

== Schedule ==
Date	Opponent	Site	Result	Attendance	Source
September 19	Catawba*	Lexington Recreation Field; Lexington, VA	W 44–0	3,000	
September 26	George Washington	Wilson Field; Lexington, VA	L 13–14	4,500	
October 3	at Richmond	City Stadium; Richmond, VA (rivalry)	L 7–13	10,000	
October 10	at The Citadel	Johnson Hagood Stadium; Charleston, SC (rivalry)	W 14–0	5,000	
October 17	at Virginia*	Scott Stadium; Charlottesville, VA	W 21–6	18,000	
October 24	at No. 8 West Virginia	Mountaineer Field; Morgantown, WV	L 20–52	23,000	
October 31	at Florida State*	Doak Campbell Stadium; Tallahassee, FL	L 7–12	14,000	
November 7	vs. William & Mary	Victory Stadium; Roanoke, VA (rivalry)	W 20–19		
November 14	at Cincinnati*	Nippert Stadium; Cincinnati, OH	L 0–67	16,000–17,000	
November 26	vs. VPI	Victory Stadium; Roanoke, VA (rivalry)	W 28–13	26,000	
*Non-conference game; Rankings from AP Poll released prior to the game
