= 1953 William & Mary Indians football team =

American college football season

1953 William & Mary Indians football
- Conference: Southern Conference
- Record: 5–4–1 (3–2 SoCon)
- Head coach: Jack Freeman (2nd season)
- Captains: Tommy Martin; Steve Milkovich
- Home stadium: Cary Field

1953 Southern Conference football standings
	Conf.					Overall
Team	W		L		T	W		L		T
No. 10 West Virginia $	4	–	0	–	0	8	–	2	–	0
Furman	2	–	0	–	0	7	–	2	–	0
George Washington	4	–	2	–	0	5	–	4	–	0
William & Mary	3	–	2	–	0	5	–	4	–	1
Richmond	3	–	3	–	0	5	–	3	–	1
VPI	3	–	3	–	0	5	–	5	–	0
VMI	3	–	3	–	0	5	–	5	–	0
Washington and Lee	2	–	4	–	0	4	–	6	–	0
The Citadel	1	–	3	–	0	2	–	7	–	0
Davidson	0	–	5	–	0	0	–	9	–	0
$ – Conference champion; Rankings from AP Poll

The 1953 William & Mary Indians football team represented the College of William & Mary as a member of the Southern Conference (SoCon) during the 1953 college football season. The team is considered, within the school's community, to be one of the most remarkable stories in its athletics history. Due to an academic cheating scandal (unrelated to the 1951 scandal), eight of the team's starting members were dismissed from school and another portion of the remaining 33 players transferred out. Among the 24 remaining players, five were returning Korean War veterans and one other had never played a minute of football in his life. Many of them were undersized (the quarterback stood 5′8″ and weighed 160 pounds) and the coaching staff was few in numbers: five total, including Boydson Baird, William & Mary's head basketball coach.

Their schedule was so tough that opposing teams would call ahead to make sure that William & Mary still intended on playing them the following week. The Indians started the season 5–2–1 before losing their final two games after accumulating injuries with few available substitutions. Six of the players went on to play professional football. The 1953 team was profiled in a 2011 book written by Rene A. Henry and titled The Iron Indians.

== Schedule ==
Date	Time	Opponent	Site	Result	Attendance	Source
September 19		vs. Wake Forest*	City Stadium; Richmond, VA (Tobacco Bowl)	W 16–14	20,000	
September 26		at Navy*	Thompson Stadium; Annapolis, MD	T 6–6	13,000	
October 3		at Cincinnati*	Nippert Stadium; Cincinnati, OH	L 7–57	21,000	
October 17		VPI	Cary Field; Williamsburg, VA	W 13–7		
October 24		George Washington	Cary Field; Williamsburg, VA	W 12–7	6,500	
October 31		at NC State*	Riddick Stadium; Raleigh, NC	W 7–6	7,500	
November 7		vs. VMI	Victory Stadium; Roanoke, VA (rivalry)	L 19–20		
November 14		at Richmond	City Stadium; Richmond, VA (rivalry)	W 21–0	18,000	
November 21		Washington and Lee	Cary Field; Williamsburg, VA	L 7–33	3,300	
November 28	1:30 p.m.	Boston University*	Cary Field; Williamsburg, VA	L 14–41	2,300	
*Non-conference game; All times are in Eastern time

== NFL draft selections ==
= Pro Football Hall of Fame	= Canadian Football Hall of Fame	= College Football Hall of Fame

Year	Round	Pick	Overall	Name	Team	Position
1954	3	12	37	Bill Bowman	Detroit Lions	Back
1954	5	12	61	George Parozzo	Detroit Lions	Tackle
1954	19	1	218	Jerry Sazio	Chicago Cardinals	Tackle
1954	22	5	258	Charlie Sumner	Chicago Bears	Back
