= 1953 VPI Gobblers football team =

American college football season

1953 VPI Gobblers football
- Conference: Southern Conference
- Record: 5–5 (3–3 SoCon)
- Head coach: Frank Moseley (3rd season)
- Home stadium: Miles Stadium

1953 Southern Conference football standings
	Conf.					Overall
Team	W		L		T	W		L		T
No. 10 West Virginia $	4	–	0	–	0	8	–	2	–	0
Furman	2	–	0	–	0	7	–	2	–	0
George Washington	4	–	2	–	0	5	–	4	–	0
William & Mary	3	–	2	–	0	5	–	4	–	1
Richmond	3	–	3	–	0	5	–	3	–	1
VPI	3	–	3	–	0	5	–	5	–	0
VMI	3	–	3	–	0	5	–	5	–	0
Washington and Lee	2	–	4	–	0	4	–	6	–	0
The Citadel	1	–	3	–	0	2	–	7	–	0
Davidson	0	–	5	–	0	0	–	9	–	0
$ – Conference champion; Rankings from AP Poll

The 1953 VPI Gobblers football team represented the Virginia Polytechnic Institute or VPI (now known as Virginia Polytechnic Institute and State University or Virginia Tech) as a member of the Southern Conference (SoCon) during the 1953 college football season. Led by third-year head coach Frank Moseley the Gobblers compiled an overall record of 5–5 with a mark of 3–3 in conference play, and finished ted for fifth in the SoCon. VPI played home games at Miles Stadium in Blacksburg, Virginia.

== Schedule ==
Date	Time	Opponent	Site	Result	Attendance	Source
September 19	8:00 p.m.	vs. Marshall*	Bluefield Municipal Stadium; Bluefield, WV	W 7–0		
September 26		at Virginia*	Scott Stadium; Charlottesville, VA (rivalry)	W 20–6	20,000	
October 3		at Rutgers*	Rutgers Stadium; Piscataway, NJ	L 13–20	10,000	
October 10		Richmond	Miles Stadium; Blacksburg, VA	W 21–7		
October 17		at William & Mary	Cary Field; Williamsburg, VA	L 7–13	12,500	
October 24		Washington and Lee^{†}	Miles Stadium; Blacksburg, VA	W 32–12	11,000	
October 30		vs. The Citadel	Victory Stadium; Roanoke, VA	W 22–0	4,000	
November 7	1:45 p.m.	vs. No. 7 West Virginia	Bluefield Municipal Stadium; Bluefield, WV (rivalry)	L 7–12	12,300	
November 13		at Miami (FL)*	Burdine Stadium; Miami, FL (rivalry)	L 0–26	17,000–17,105	
November 26	1:00 p.m.	vs. VMI	Victory Stadium; Roanoke, VA (rivalry)	L 13–28	26,000	
*Non-conference game; ^{†}Homecoming; Rankings from Coaches' Poll released prior to the game; All times are in Eastern time

== Roster ==
The following players were members of the 1953 football team according to the roster published in the 1954 edition of The Bugle, the Virginia Tech yearbook.

VPI 1953 roster
Bob Allen; William R. Anderson; Richard VanMetre "Dickie" Beard; Donald C. Booth; Gordon Derwood "Sonny" Bowman II; Franklin Dewey Brown; Leo Burke; Hayes Howell Burleson; Doug Creger; Johnny Dean; Hugh David Ebert; James Glen Fleenor; Harold Byrd Grizzard	James H. Haren; James Lupton Hedrick; Charles Donald Herb; Tom Hughes; William Edward Jamerson; Edward Houston Kavanaugh; William Duncan Kerfoot; Julian Neville King; Robert Stevens Luttrell; Don Mitchell; John Stewart Moody; Thomas R. Petty; George Preas; Jim Randall	Robert Earl Scruggs; Roger Winfield Simmons; Donald Gaylon Sink; Hunter E. Swink; Thompson; A.E. Trapp; A. Turlington; Phillip William Unger; Joseph Franklin Wells; Don "Ducky" Welsh; Jack Williams; Ernie Wolfe; Bobby Wolfenden; Howard Irving Wright
