= 1953 South Carolina Gamecocks football team =

American college football season

1953 South Carolina Gamecocks football
- Conference: Atlantic Coast Conference
- Record: 7–3 (2–3 ACC)
- Head coach: Rex Enright (13th season)
- Captain: Gene Wilson
- Home stadium: Carolina Stadium

1953 Atlantic Coast Conference football standings
	Conf.					Overall
Team	W		L		T	W		L		T
No. 1 Maryland +	3	–	0	–	0	10	–	1	–	0
No. 18 Duke +	4	–	0	–	0	7	–	2	–	1
South Carolina	2	–	3	–	0	7	–	3	–	0
North Carolina	2	–	3	–	0	4	–	6	–	0
Wake Forest	2	–	3	–	0	3	–	6	–	1
Clemson	1	–	2	–	0	3	–	5	–	1
NC State	0	–	3	–	0	1	–	9	–	0
+ – Conference co-champions; Rankings from AP poll

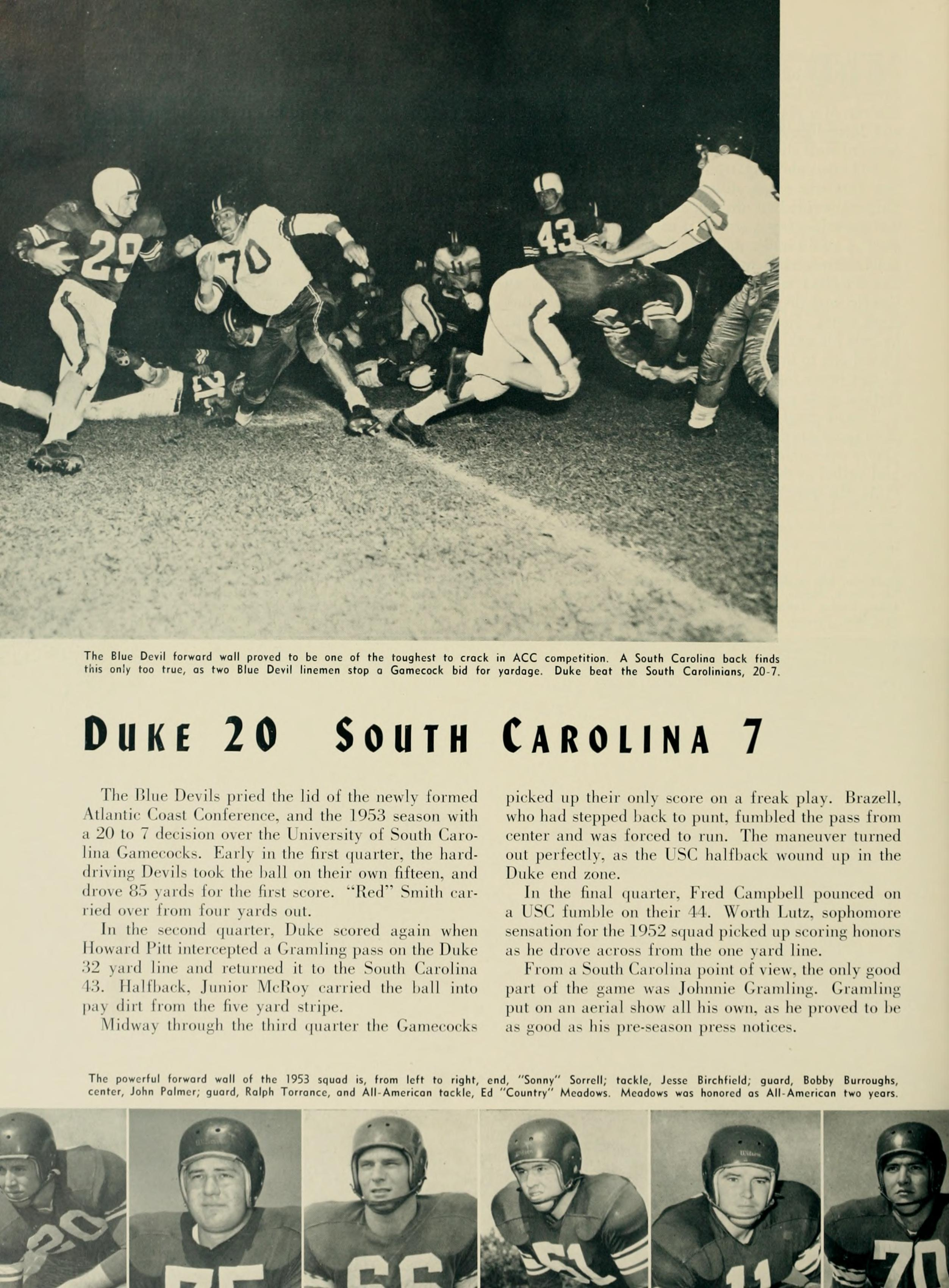

The 1953 South Carolina Gamecocks football team represented the University of South Carolina as a member of the Atlantic Coast Conference (ACC) during the 1953 college football season. Led by 13th-year head coach Rex Enright, the Gamecocks compiled an overall record of 7–3 with a mark of 2–3 in conference play, placing in a three-way tie for third in the ACC. The team played home games at Carolina Stadium in Columbia, South Carolina.

1953 was the ACC's inaugural year of competition. South Carolina and six other schools from the Southern Conference (SoCon) broke off to form the new conference in 1953.

Also this year, South Carolina entered the AP Poll for the first time in school history, though it would be another five years before it would finish a season ranked in that poll.

== Schedule ==
Date	Time	Opponent	Rank	Site	Result	Attendance	Source
September 19		No. 10 Duke		Carolina Stadium; Columbia, SC	L 7–20	30,000	
September 28		The Citadel*		Carolina Stadium; Columbia, SC	W 25–0	15,000	
October 3		at Virginia*		Scott Stadium; Charlottesville, VA	W 19–0	12,000	
October 10		Furman*		Carolina Stadium; Columbia, SC	W 27–13	15,000	
October 22		Clemson		Carolina Stadium; Columbia, SC (rivalry)	W 14–7	35,000	
October 31		at No. 2 Maryland		Byrd Stadium; College Park, MD	L 6–24	22,000	
November 7		North Carolina		Carolina Stadium; Columbia, SC (rivalry)	W 18–0	23,000	
November 14		at No. 8 West Virginia*		Mountaineer Field; Morgantown, WV	W 20–14	31,000	
November 21		Wofford*	No. 18	Carolina Stadium; Columbia, SC	W 49–0	8,000	
November 26	2:00 p.m.	vs. Wake Forest	No. 15	American Legion Memorial Stadium; Charlotte, NC	L 13–19	11,000	
*Non-conference game; Rankings from AP Poll released prior to the game
