= 1953 North Carolina Tar Heels football team =

American college football season

1953 North Carolina Tar Heels football
- Conference: Atlantic Coast Conference
- Record: 4–6 (2–3 ACC)
- Head coach: George T. Barclay (1st season)
- Captain: Ken Yarborough
- Home stadium: Kenan Memorial Stadium

1953 Atlantic Coast Conference football standings
| | Conf. | | | | | Overall |
| Team | W | | L | | T | W | | L | | T |
|---|---|---|---|---|---|---|---|---|---|---|
| No. 1 Maryland + | 3 | – | 0 | – | 0 | 10 | – | 1 | – | 0 |
| No. 18 Duke + | 4 | – | 0 | – | 0 | 7 | – | 2 | – | 1 |
| South Carolina | 2 | – | 3 | – | 0 | 7 | – | 3 | – | 0 |
| North Carolina | 2 | – | 3 | – | 0 | 4 | – | 6 | – | 0 |
| Wake Forest | 2 | – | 3 | – | 0 | 3 | – | 6 | – | 1 |
| Clemson | 1 | – | 2 | – | 0 | 3 | – | 5 | – | 1 |
| NC State | 0 | – | 3 | – | 0 | 1 | – | 9 | – | 0 |
+ – Conference co-champions; Rankings from AP poll

The 1953 North Carolina Tar Heels football team represented the University of North Carolina at Chapel Hill during the 1953 college football season. The Tar Heels were led by first-year head coach George T. Barclay, and played their home games at Kenan Memorial Stadium. The team competed as a member of the Atlantic Coast Conference, in the conference's inaugural year, finishing tied for third.

== Schedule ==
| Date | Time | Opponent | Site | Result | Attendance | Source |
|---|---|---|---|---|---|---|
| September 26 | 2:30 p.m. | NC State | Kenan Memorial Stadium; Chapel Hill, NC (rivalry) | W 29–7 | 20,000 | |
| October 3 | 2:00 p.m. | Washington & Lee* | Kenan Memorial Stadium; Chapel Hill, NC | W 39–0 | 18,000 | |
| October 10 | 2:00 p.m. | at Wake Forest | Groves Stadium (I); Wake Forest, NC (rivalry) | W 18–13 | 12,000 | |
| October 17 | 2:00 p.m. | No. 3 Maryland | Kenan Memorial Stadium; Chapel Hill, NC | L 0–26 | 35,000 | |
| October 24 | 2:00 p.m. | at Georgia* | Sanford Stadium; Athens, GA | L 14–27 | 30,000 | |
| October 31 | 2:00 p.m. | Tennessee* | Kenan Memorial Stadium; Chapel Hill, NC | L 6–20 | 27,000 | |
| November 7 | 2:00 p.m. | at South Carolina | Carolina Stadium; Columbia, SC (rivalry) | L 0–18 | 23,000 | |
| November 14 | 2:00 p.m. | No. 1 Notre Dame* | Kenan Memorial Stadium; Chapel Hill, NC (rivalry) | L 14–34 | 43,000 | |
| November 21 | 2:00 p.m. | at Virginia* | Scott Stadium; Charlottesville, VA (South's Oldest Rivalry) | W 33–7 | 13,000 | |
| November 28 | 2:00 p.m. | at Duke | Duke Stadium; Durham, NC (Victory Bell) | L 20–35 | 40,000 | |
*Non-conference game; Rankings from AP Poll released prior to the game; All times are in Eastern time
