= 1953 Wake Forest Demon Deacons football team =

American college football season

1953 Wake Forest Demon Deacons football
- Conference: Atlantic Coast Conference
- Record: 3–6–1 (2–3 ACC)
- Head coach: Tom Rogers (3rd season)
- Captain: Sonny George
- Home stadium: Groves Stadium

1953 Atlantic Coast Conference football standings
	Conf.					Overall
Team	W		L		T	W		L		T
No. 1 Maryland +	3	–	0	–	0	10	–	1	–	0
No. 18 Duke +	4	–	0	–	0	7	–	2	–	1
South Carolina	2	–	3	–	0	7	–	3	–	0
North Carolina	2	–	3	–	0	4	–	6	–	0
Wake Forest	2	–	3	–	0	3	–	6	–	1
Clemson	1	–	2	–	0	3	–	5	–	1
NC State	0	–	3	–	0	1	–	9	–	0
+ – Conference co-champions; Rankings from AP poll

The 1953 Wake Forest Demon Deacons football team was an American football team that represented Wake Forest University during the 1953 college football season. In their third season under head coach Tom Rogers, the Demon Deacons compiled a 3–6–1 record and finished in a three-way tie for third place in the Atlantic Coast Conference with a 2–3 record against conference opponents.

== Schedule ==
Date	Time	Opponent	Site	Result	Attendance	Source
September 19		vs. William & Mary*	City Stadium; Richmond, VA (Tobacco Bowl)	L 14–16	20,000	
September 26		at No. 10 Duke	Duke Stadium; Durham, NC (rivalry)	L 0–19	20,000	
October 3	2:30 p.m.	vs. Villanova*	Bowman Gray Stadium; Winston-Salem, NC	W 18–12	10,000	
October 10		North Carolina	Groves Stadium; Wake Forest, NC (rivalry)	L 13–18	12,000	
October 17		at NC State	Riddick Stadium; Raleigh, NC (rivalry)	W 20–7	12,000	
October 24		at Richmond*	City Stadium; Richmond, VA	T 13–13	7,000	
October 31		at Clemson	Memorial Stadium; Clemson, SC	L 0–18	18,000	
November 7		at Boston College*	Fenway Park; Boston, MA	L 7–20	3,273	
November 21		Furman*	Groves Stadium; Wake Forest, NC	L 10–21	5,000	
November 26	2:00 p.m.	vs. No. 15 South Carolina	American Legion Memorial Stadium; Charlotte, NC	W 19–13	11,000	
*Non-conference game; Rankings from AP Poll released prior to the game

== Team leaders ==
Category	Team Leader	Att/Cth	Yds
Passing	Joe White	32/87	486
Rushing	Johnny Parham	96	304
Receiving	Bob Ondilla	21	294
