= 1953 Davidson Wildcats football team =

American college football season

1953 Davidson Wildcats football
- Conference: Southern Conference
- Record: 0–9 (0–5 SoCon)
- Head coach: Bill Dole (2nd season)
- Home stadium: Richardson Stadium

1953 Southern Conference football standings
	Conf.					Overall
Team	W		L		T	W		L		T
No. 10 West Virginia $	4	–	0	–	0	8	–	2	–	0
Furman	2	–	0	–	0	7	–	2	–	0
George Washington	4	–	2	–	0	5	–	4	–	0
William & Mary	3	–	2	–	0	5	–	4	–	1
Richmond	3	–	3	–	0	5	–	3	–	1
VPI	3	–	3	–	0	5	–	5	–	0
VMI	3	–	3	–	0	5	–	5	–	0
Washington and Lee	2	–	4	–	0	4	–	6	–	0
The Citadel	1	–	3	–	0	2	–	7	–	0
Davidson	0	–	5	–	0	0	–	9	–	0
$ – Conference champion; Rankings from AP Poll

The 1953 Davidson Wildcats football team was an American football team that represented Davidson College during the 1953 college football season as a member of the Southern Conference. In their second year under head coach Bill Dole, the team compiled an overall record of 0–9, with a mark of 0–5 in conference play, and finished in last place in the SoCon.

== Schedule ==
Date	Opponent	Site	Result	Attendance	Source
September 19	at No. 3 Georgia Tech*	Grant Field; Atlanta, GA	L 0–53	22,000	
September 26	at Richmond	City Stadium; Richmond, VA	L 0–16	3,000	
October 10	at NC State*	Riddick Stadium; Raleigh, NC	L 7–27	8,000	
October 17	Presbyterian*^{†}	Richardson Stadium; Davidson, NC	L 18–19		
October 24	at Furman	Sirrine Stadium; Greenville, SC	L 0–34		
October 31	at Harvard*	Harvard Stadium; Boston, MA	L 6–42	8,500	
November 7	vs. Washington and Lee	Bowman Gray Stadium; Winston-Salem, NC	L 7–34	1,500	
November 14	George Washington	Richardson Stadium; Davidson, NC	L 0–33		
November 21	The Citadel	Richardson Stadium; Davidson, NC	L 14–38	3,500	
*Non-conference game; ^{†}Homecoming; Rankings from AP Poll released prior to the game
