= 1953 Washington and Lee Generals football team =

American college football season

1953 Washington and Lee Generals football
- Conference: Southern Conference
- Record: 4–6 (2–4 SoCon)
- Head coach: Carl Wise (2nd season)
- Home stadium: Wilson Field

1953 Southern Conference football standings
	Conf.					Overall
Team	W		L		T	W		L		T
No. 10 West Virginia $	4	–	0	–	0	8	–	2	–	0
Furman	2	–	0	–	0	7	–	2	–	0
George Washington	4	–	2	–	0	5	–	4	–	0
William & Mary	3	–	2	–	0	5	–	4	–	1
Richmond	3	–	3	–	0	5	–	3	–	1
VPI	3	–	3	–	0	5	–	5	–	0
VMI	3	–	3	–	0	5	–	5	–	0
Washington and Lee	2	–	4	–	0	4	–	6	–	0
The Citadel	1	–	3	–	0	2	–	7	–	0
Davidson	0	–	5	–	0	0	–	9	–	0
$ – Conference champion; Rankings from AP Poll

The 1953 Washington and Lee Generals football team was an American football team that represented Washington and Lee University during the 1953 college football season as a member of the Southern Conference. In their second year under head coach Carl Wise, the team compiled an overall record of 4–6, with a mark of 2–4 in conference play. In August 1954, the University trustees canceled the Generals' 1954 season after deciding to no longer provide subsidies for intercollegiate athletics.

== Schedule ==
Date	Opponent	Site	Result	Attendance	Source
September 19	Shepherd*	Wilson Field; Lexington, VA	W 47–0		
September 26	at No. 9 Maryland*	Byrd Stadium; College Park, MD	L 0–52	35,000	
October 3	at North Carolina*	Kenan Memorial Stadium; Chapel Hill, NC	L 0–39	18,000	
October 10	at No. 12 West Virginia	Mountaineer Field; Morgantown, WV	L 14–40	14,000	
October 17	Richmond	Wilson Field; Lexington, VA	L 19–27	5,000	
October 24	at VPI	Miles Stadium; Blacksburg, VA	L 12–32	11,000	
October 31	George Washington	Wilson Field; Lexington, VA	L 7–25	5,000	
November 7	vs. Davidson	Bowman Gray Stadium; Winston-Salem, NC	W 34–7	1,500	
November 14	Virginia*	Wilson Field; Lexington, VA	W 27–13	10,000	
November 21	at William & Mary	Cary Field; Williamsburg, VA	W 33–7	3,300	
*Non-conference game; Rankings from AP Poll released prior to the game
