= 1953 George Washington Colonials football team =

American football team

1953 George Washington Colonials football
- Conference: Southern Conference
- Record: 5–4 (4–2 SoCon)
- Head coach: Bo Sherman (2nd season)
- Home stadium: Griffith Stadium

1953 Southern Conference football standings
	Conf.					Overall
Team	W		L		T	W		L		T
No. 10 West Virginia $	4	–	0	–	0	8	–	2	–	0
Furman	2	–	0	–	0	7	–	2	–	0
George Washington	4	–	2	–	0	5	–	4	–	0
William & Mary	3	–	2	–	0	5	–	4	–	1
Richmond	3	–	3	–	0	5	–	3	–	1
VPI	3	–	3	–	0	5	–	5	–	0
VMI	3	–	3	–	0	5	–	5	–	0
Washington and Lee	2	–	4	–	0	4	–	6	–	0
The Citadel	1	–	3	–	0	2	–	7	–	0
Davidson	0	–	5	–	0	0	–	9	–	0
$ – Conference champion; Rankings from AP Poll

The 1953 George Washington Colonials football team was an American football team that represented George Washington University as part of the Southern Conference during the 1953 college football season. In their second season under head coach Bo Sherman, the team compiled a 5–4 record (4–2 in the SoCon).

== Schedule ==
Date	Opponent	Site	Result	Attendance	Source
September 26	at VMI	Wilson Field; Lexington, VA	W 14–13	4,500	
October 3	NC State*	George Washington HS Stadium; Alexandria, VA	W 20–7		
October 10	Virginia*	George Washington HS Stadium; Alexandria, VA	L 20–24	9,500	
October 16	No. 10 West Virginia	Griffith Stadium; Washington, DC	L 6–27		
October 24	at William & Mary	Cary Field; Williamsburg, VA	L 7–12	6,500	
October 31	at Washington and Lee	Wilson Field; Lexington, VA	W 25–7	5,000	
November 7	No. 2 Maryland*	Griffith Stadium; Washington, DC	L 6–27	8,900	
November 14	at Davidson	Richardson Stadium; Davidson, NC	W 33–0		
November 21	Richmond	Griffith Stadium; Washington, DC	W 35–7	5,600	
*Non-conference game; Rankings from AP Poll released prior to the game
