= 1953 NC State Wolfpack football team =

American college football season

1953 NC State Wolfpack football
- Conference: Atlantic Coast Conference
- Record: 1–9 (0–3 ACC)
- Head coach: Horace Hendrickson (2nd season)
- Home stadium: Riddick Stadium

1953 Atlantic Coast Conference football standings
	Conf.					Overall
Team	W		L		T	W		L		T
No. 1 Maryland +	3	–	0	–	0	10	–	1	–	0
No. 18 Duke +	4	–	0	–	0	7	–	2	–	1
South Carolina	2	–	3	–	0	7	–	3	–	0
North Carolina	2	–	3	–	0	4	–	6	–	0
Wake Forest	2	–	3	–	0	3	–	6	–	1
Clemson	1	–	2	–	0	3	–	5	–	1
NC State	0	–	3	–	0	1	–	9	–	0
+ – Conference co-champions; Rankings from AP poll

The 1953 NC State Wolfpack football team represented North Carolina State University during the 1953 college football season. The Wolfpack were led by second-year head coach Horace Hendrickson and played their home games at Riddick Stadium in Raleigh, North Carolina. They competed as members of the Atlantic Coast Conference in the league's inaugural year, after NC State and the other ACC schools split off from the Southern Conference. They finished winless in conference with a 0–3 record, and a 1–9 record overall. Hendrickson resigned as head coach following the end of the season.

== Schedule ==
Date	Opponent	Site	Result	Attendance	Source
September 26	at North Carolina	Kenan Memorial Stadium; Chapel Hill, NC (rivalry)	L 7–29	20,000	
October 3	at George Washington*	George Washington HS Stadium; Alexandria, VA	L 7–20		
October 10	Davidson*	Riddick Stadium; Raleigh, NC	W 27–7	8,000	
October 17	Wake Forest	Riddick Stadium; Raleigh, NC (rivalry)	L 7–20	12,000	
October 24	at No. 16 Duke	Duke Stadium; Durham, NC (rivalry)	L 0–31	15,000	
October 31	William & Mary*	Riddick Stadium; Raleigh, NC	L 6–7	7,500	
November 7	at Army*	Michie Stadium; West Point, NY	L 7–27	9,230–9,400	
November 14	at Pittsburgh*	Pitt Stadium; Pittsburgh, PA	L 6–40	18,019	
November 21	No. 19 West Virginia*	Riddick Stadium; Raleigh, NC	L 0–61	5,800	
November 28	at Florida State*	Doak Campbell Stadium; Tallahassee, FL	L 13–23	5,000	
*Non-conference game; Rankings from AP Poll released prior to the game
