= 1953 The Citadel Bulldogs football team =

American college football season

1953 The Citadel Bulldogs football
- Conference: Southern Conference
- Record: 2–7 (1–3 SoCon)
- Head coach: John D. McMillan (1st season)
- Home stadium: Johnson Hagood Stadium

1953 Southern Conference football standings
	Conf.					Overall
Team	W		L		T	W		L		T
No. 10 West Virginia $	4	–	0	–	0	8	–	2	–	0
Furman	2	–	0	–	0	7	–	2	–	0
George Washington	4	–	2	–	0	5	–	4	–	0
William & Mary	3	–	2	–	0	5	–	4	–	1
Richmond	3	–	3	–	0	5	–	3	–	1
VPI	3	–	3	–	0	5	–	5	–	0
VMI	3	–	3	–	0	5	–	5	–	0
Washington and Lee	2	–	4	–	0	4	–	6	–	0
The Citadel	1	–	3	–	0	2	–	7	–	0
Davidson	0	–	5	–	0	0	–	9	–	0
$ – Conference champion; Rankings from AP Poll

The 1953 The Citadel Bulldogs football team represented The Citadel, The Military College of South Carolina in the 1953 college football season. John D. McMillan served as head coach for the first season. The Bulldogs played as members of the Southern Conference and played home games at Johnson Hagood Stadium.

== Schedule ==
Date	Opponent	Site	Result	Attendance	Source
September 19	at Tulane*	Tulane Stadium; New Orleans, LA	L 6–54		
September 28	at South Carolina*	Carolina Stadium; Columbia, SC	L 0–25	15,000	
October 2	Furman	Johnson Hagood Stadium; Charleston, SC (rivalry)	L 0–27	8,000	
October 10	VMI^{†}	Johnson Hagood Stadium; Charleston, SC (rivalry)	L 0–14	5,000	
October 17	vs. Florida*	Gator Bowl Stadium; Jacksonville, FL	L 0–60	15,000	
October 24	Presbyterian*	Johnson Hagood Stadium; Charleston, SC	W 20–14		
October 30	vs. VPI	Victory Stadium; Roanoke, VA	L 0–22	4,000	
November 14	Clemson*	Johnson Hagood Stadium; Charleston, SC	L 13–24	8,336	
November 21	at Davidson	Richardson Stadium; Davidson, NC	W 38–14	3,500	
*Non-conference game; ^{†}Homecoming
