= 1953 Maryland Terrapins football team =

American college football season

1953 Maryland Terrapins football

Consensus national champion ACC co-champion

Orange Bowl, L 0–7 vs. Oklahoma
- Conference: Atlantic Coast Conference

Ranking
- Coaches: No. 1
- AP: No. 1
- Record: 10–1 (3–0 ACC)
- Head coach: Jim Tatum (7th season)
- Offensive scheme: Split-T
- Home stadium: Byrd Stadium

1953 Atlantic Coast Conference football standings
	Conf.					Overall
Team	W		L		T	W		L		T
No. 1 Maryland +	3	–	0	–	0	10	–	1	–	0
No. 18 Duke +	4	–	0	–	0	7	–	2	–	1
South Carolina	2	–	3	–	0	7	–	3	–	0
North Carolina	2	–	3	–	0	4	–	6	–	0
Wake Forest	2	–	3	–	0	3	–	6	–	1
Clemson	1	–	2	–	0	3	–	5	–	1
NC State	0	–	3	–	0	1	–	9	–	0
+ – Conference co-champions; Rankings from AP poll

The 1953 Maryland Terrapins football team represented the University of Maryland in the 1953 college football season in its first season as a member of the Atlantic Coast Conference (ACC). Maryland outscored its opponents 298–38 and recorded six defensive shutouts. Jim Tatum served as the head coach for the seventh year of his nine-year tenure. In the postseason, Maryland lost to Oklahoma in the 1954 Orange Bowl. The team was selected national champion by Associated Press, International News Service, and United Press International, leading to a consensus national champion designation.

== Schedule ==
Date	Opponent	Rank	Site	Result	Attendance	Source
September 19	at Missouri*	No. 9	Memorial Stadium; Columbia, MO	W 20–6	21,000	
September 26	Washington and Lee*	No. 9	Byrd Stadium; College Park, MD	W 52–0	35,000	
October 3	at Clemson	No. 3	Memorial Stadium; Clemson, SC	W 20–0	25,000	
October 10	Georgia*	No. 4	Byrd Stadium; College Park, MD	W 40–13	27,000	
October 17	at North Carolina	No. 3	Kenan Memorial Stadium; Chapel Hill, NC	W 26–0	35,000	
October 23	at Miami (FL)*	No. 3	Burdine Stadium; Miami, FL	W 30–0	42,157	
October 31	at South Carolina^{†}	No. 1	Byrd Stadium; College Park, MD	W 24–6	22,000	
November 7	at George Washington*	No. 2	Griffith Stadium; Washington, DC	W 27–6	8,000	
November 14	No. 11 Ole Miss*	No. 2	Byrd Stadium; College Park, MD	W 38–0	35,000	
November 21	No. 11 Alabama*	No. 2	Byrd Stadium; College Park, MD	W 21–0	36,000	
January 1, 1954	No. 4 Oklahoma*	No. 1	Burdine Stadium; Miami, FL (Orange Bowl)	L 0–7	68,640–68,718	
*Non-conference game; ^{†}Homecoming; Rankings from AP Poll released prior to the game

== Personnel ==
The 1953 team consisted of the following letterwinners:

- George Albrecht
- Ralph Baierl
- Lynn Beightol
- Dick Bielski
- Ray Blackburn
- Jack Bowersox
- Charles Boxold
- Don Brougher
- Dick Burgee
- Marty Crytzer
- Russell Dennis
- Bernie Faloney
- Ralph Felton
- Tim Flynn
- Chet Hanulak
- Fred Heffner
- Herb Hoffman
- Joe Horning
- John Irvine
- Stan Jones
- Jim Kilgallen
- Paul Kramer
- Tom McLuckie
- Bob Morgan
- Dick Nolan
- Dave Nusz
- George Palahunik
- Jim Parsons
- Bob Pellegrini
- Richard Shipley
- Ed Vereb
- Ron Waller
- Bill Walker
- John Weiciecowski

The coaching staff consisted of:

- Jim Tatum, head coach
- Emmett Cheek
- Warren Giese, ends
- Jack Hennemier, defensive line
- Tommy Mont, backfield
- Vernon Seibert
- Eddie Teague, defensive backfield
- Bob Ward
