= 1953 Richmond Spiders football team =

American college football season

1953 Richmond Spiders football
- Conference: Southern Conference
- Record: 5–3–1 (3–3 SoCon)
- Head coach: Ed Merrick (3rd season)
- Captains: Al Pecuch; Corky Johns
- Home stadium: City Stadium

1953 Southern Conference football standings
	Conf.					Overall
Team	W		L		T	W		L		T
No. 10 West Virginia $	4	–	0	–	0	8	–	2	–	0
Furman	2	–	0	–	0	7	–	2	–	0
George Washington	4	–	2	–	0	5	–	4	–	0
William & Mary	3	–	2	–	0	5	–	4	–	1
Richmond	3	–	3	–	0	5	–	3	–	1
VPI	3	–	3	–	0	5	–	5	–	0
VMI	3	–	3	–	0	5	–	5	–	0
Washington and Lee	2	–	4	–	0	4	–	6	–	0
The Citadel	1	–	3	–	0	2	–	7	–	0
Davidson	0	–	5	–	0	0	–	9	–	0
$ – Conference champion; Rankings from AP Poll

The 1953 Richmond Spiders football team was an American football team that represented the University of Richmond as a member of the Southern Conference (SoCon) during the 1953 college football season. In their third season under head coach Ed Merrick, Richmond compiled a 5–3–1 record, with a mark of 3–3 in conference play, finishing tied for fifth place in the SoCon.

== Schedule ==
Date	Opponent	Site	Result	Attendance	Source
September 18	Randolph–Macon*	City Stadium; Richmond, VA	W 28–0	3,000	
September 26	Davidson	City Stadium; Richmond, VA	W 16–0	3,000	
October 3	VMI	City Stadium; Richmond, VA (rivalry)	W 13–7	10,000	
October 10	at VPI	Miles Stadium; Blacksburg, VA	L 7–21		
October 17	at Washington and Lee	Wilson Field; Lexington, VA	W 27–19	5,000	
October 24	Wake Forest*	City Stadium; Richmond, VA	T 13–13	7,000	
October 31	at Boston College*	Fenway Park; Boston, MA	W 14–0	6,167	
November 14	William & Mary	City Stadium; Richmond, VA (rivalry)	L 0–21	18,000	
November 21	at George Washington	Griffith Stadium; Washington, DC	L 7–35	5,600	
*Non-conference game
