= 1953 Furman Purple Hurricane football team =

American college football season

1953 Furman Purple Hurricane football
- Conference: Southern Conference
- Record: 7–2 (2–0 SoCon)
- Head coach: Bill Young (4th season)
- Captain: Charlie West
- Home stadium: Sirrine Stadium

1953 Southern Conference football standings
	Conf.					Overall
Team	W		L		T	W		L		T
No. 10 West Virginia $	4	–	0	–	0	8	–	2	–	0
Furman	2	–	0	–	0	7	–	2	–	0
George Washington	4	–	2	–	0	5	–	4	–	0
William & Mary	3	–	2	–	0	5	–	4	–	1
Richmond	3	–	3	–	0	5	–	3	–	1
VPI	3	–	3	–	0	5	–	5	–	0
VMI	3	–	3	–	0	5	–	5	–	0
Washington and Lee	2	–	4	–	0	4	–	6	–	0
The Citadel	1	–	3	–	0	2	–	7	–	0
Davidson	0	–	5	–	0	0	–	9	–	0
$ – Conference champion; Rankings from AP Poll

The 1953 Furman Purple Hurricane football team was an American football team that represented Furman University as a member of the Southern Conference (SoCon) during the 1953 college football season. Led by fourth-year head coach Bill Young, the Purple Hurricane compiled an overall record of 7–2 with a mark of 2–0 in conference play, placing second in the SoCon.

== Schedule ==
Date	Opponent	Site	Result	Attendance	Source
September 18	Newberry*	Sirrine Stadium; Greenville, SC	W 33–0	7,000	
September 26	at Army*	Michie Stadium; West Point, NY	L 0–41	8,450	
October 2	at The Citadel	Johnson Hagood Stadium; Charleston, SC (rivalry)	W 27–0	8,000	
October 10	at South Carolina*	Carolina Stadium; Columbia, SC	L 13–27	15,000	
October 24	at Davidson	Sirrine Stadium; Greenville, SC	W 34–0		
October 31	at Wofford*	Snyder Field; Spartanburg, SC (rivalry)	W 7–6	6,000	
November 6	Presbyterian*	Sirrine Stadium; Greenville, SC	W 19–0	5,000	
November 14	at Florida State*	Doak Campbell Stadium; Tallahassee, FL	W 14–7		
November 21	at Wake Forest*	Groves Stadium; Wake Forest, NC	W 21–19	5,000	
*Non-conference game
