= 1953 Duke Blue Devils football team =

American college football season

1953 Duke Blue Devils football
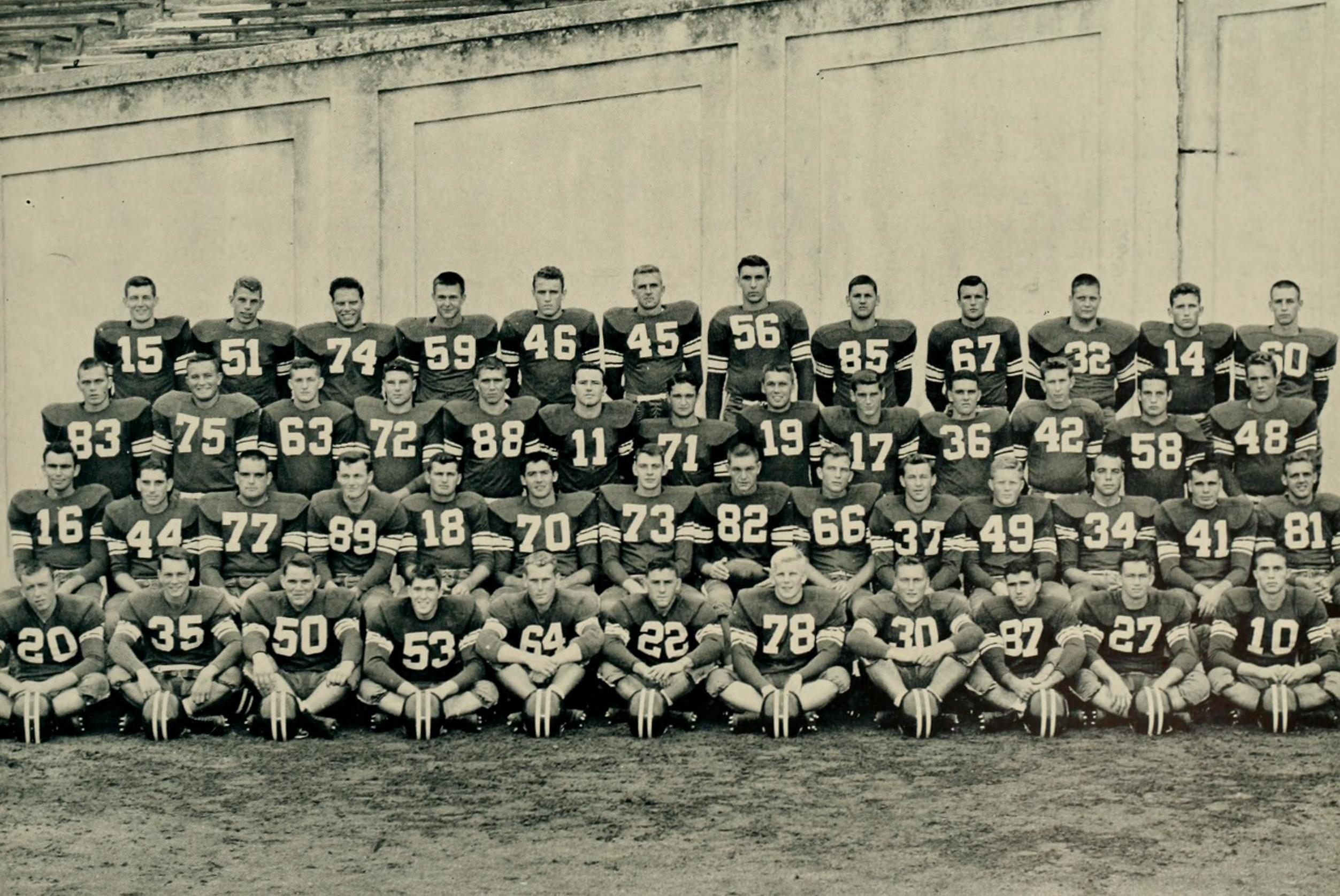

ACC co-champion
- Conference: Atlantic Coast Conference

Ranking
- Coaches: No. 18
- AP: No. 18
- Record: 7–2–1 (4–0 ACC)
- Head coach: William D. Murray (3rd season)
- MVP: Bob Burrows
- Captain: Howard Pitt
- Home stadium: Duke Stadium

1953 Atlantic Coast Conference football standings
| | Conf. | | | | | Overall |
| Team | W | | L | | T | W | | L | | T |
|---|---|---|---|---|---|---|---|---|---|---|
| No. 1 Maryland + | 3 | – | 0 | – | 0 | 10 | – | 1 | – | 0 |
| No. 18 Duke + | 4 | – | 0 | – | 0 | 7 | – | 2 | – | 1 |
| South Carolina | 2 | – | 3 | – | 0 | 7 | – | 3 | – | 0 |
| North Carolina | 2 | – | 3 | – | 0 | 4 | – | 6 | – | 0 |
| Wake Forest | 2 | – | 3 | – | 0 | 3 | – | 6 | – | 1 |
| Clemson | 1 | – | 2 | – | 0 | 3 | – | 5 | – | 1 |
| NC State | 0 | – | 3 | – | 0 | 1 | – | 9 | – | 0 |
+ – Conference co-champions; Rankings from AP poll

The 1953 Duke Blue Devils football team was an American football team that represented Duke University as a member of the Atlantic Coast Conference (ACC) during the 1953 college football season. In their third year under head coach William D. Murray, the Blue Devils compiled an overall record of 7–2–1, with a conference record of 4–0, and finished as ACC co-champion.

Duke won a share of the 1953 ACC Championship, and finished the season ranked 18th in the final AP poll.

== Schedule ==
| Date | Opponent | Rank | Site | Result | Attendance | Source |
|---|---|---|---|---|---|---|
| September 19 | at South Carolina | No. 10 | Carolina Stadium; Columbia, SC | W 20–7 | 30,000 | |
| September 26 | Wake Forest | No. 10 | Duke Stadium; Durham, NC (rivalry) | W 19–0 | 20,000 | |
| October 3 | at Tennessee* | No. 12 | Shields–Watkins Field; Knoxville, TN | W 21–7 | 30,000 | |
| October 10 | Purdue*^{†} | No. 8 | Duke Stadium; Durham, NC | W 20–14 | 30,000 | |
| October 17 | vs. Army* | No. 7 | Polo Grounds; New York, NY | L 13–14 | 21,282–21,284 | |
| October 24 | NC State | No. 16 | Duke Stadium; Durham, NC (rivalry) | W 31–0 | 15,000 | |
| October 31 | vs. Virginia* | No. 13 | Foreman Field; Norfolk, VA (Oyster Bowl) | W 48–6 | 25,000 | |
| November 7 | vs. Navy* | No. 10 | Municipal Stadium; Baltimore, MD | T 0–0 | 15,000 | |
| November 21 | at No. 12 Georgia Tech* | No. 15 | Grant Field; Atlanta, GA | L 10–13 | 40,000 | |
| November 28 | North Carolina | | Duke Stadium; Durham, NC (Victory Bell) | W 35–20 | 40,000 | |
*Non-conference game; ^{†}Homecoming; Rankings from AP Poll released prior to the game
