= 1953 Clemson Tigers football team =

American college football season

1953 Clemson Tigers football
- Conference: Atlantic Coast Conference
- Record: 3–5–1 (1–2 ACC)
- Head coach: Frank Howard (14th season)
- Captains: Dreher Gaskin; Nathan Gressette
- Home stadium: Memorial Stadium

1953 Atlantic Coast Conference football standings
	Conf.					Overall
Team	W		L		T	W		L		T
No. 1 Maryland +	3	–	0	–	0	10	–	1	–	0
No. 18 Duke +	4	–	0	–	0	7	–	2	–	1
South Carolina	2	–	3	–	0	7	–	3	–	0
North Carolina	2	–	3	–	0	4	–	6	–	0
Wake Forest	2	–	3	–	0	3	–	6	–	1
Clemson	1	–	2	–	0	3	–	5	–	1
NC State	0	–	3	–	0	1	–	9	–	0
+ – Conference co-champions; Rankings from AP poll

The 1953 Clemson Tigers football team was an American football team that represented Clemson College in the Atlantic Coast Conference (ACC) during the 1953 college football season. In its 14th season under head coach Frank Howard, the team compiled a 3–5–1 record (1–2 against conference opponents), finished sixth in the ACC, and was outscored by a total of 172 to 139. The team played its home games at Memorial Stadium in Clemson, South Carolina.

End Dreher Gaskin and tackle Nathan Gressette were the team captains. The team's statistical leaders included quarterback Don King with 706 passing yards and 243 rushing yards and Dreher Gaskin with 30 points scored (5 touchdowns).

Three Clemson players were named to the 1953 All-South Carolina football team: Dreher Gaskin, Nathan Gressette, and Don King.

== Schedule ==
Date	Time	Opponent	Site	Result	Attendance	Source
September 19	8:00 p.m.	Presbyterian*	Memorial Stadium; Clemson, SC	W 33–7	15,000	
September 26	2:00 p.m.	at Boston College*	Fenway Park; Boston, MA (rivalry)	T 26–26	10,960	
October 3	2:00 p.m.	No. 3 Maryland	Memorial Stadium; Clemson, SC	L 0–20	25,000	
October 9	8:15 p.m.	at Miami (FL)*	Burdine Stadium; Miami, FL	L 7–39	27,300–27,324	
October 22	2:00 p.m.	at South Carolina	Carolina Stadium; Columbia, SC (rivalry)	L 7–14	35,000	
October 31	2:00 p.m.	Wake Forest	Memorial Stadium; Clemson, SC	W 18–0	18,000	
November 7	2:30 p.m.	at No. 6 Georgia Tech*	Grant Field; Atlanta, GA (rivalry)	L 7–20	35,000	
November 14	2:30 p.m.	at The Citadel*	Johnson Hagood Stadium; Charleston, SC	W 34–13	8,336	
November 21	2:00 p.m.	No. 14 Auburn*^{†}	Memorial Stadium; Clemson, SC (rivalry)	L 19–45	20,000	
*Non-conference game; ^{†}Homecoming; Rankings from AP Poll released prior to the game; All times are in Eastern time
