= VMI–William & Mary football rivalry =

American college football rivalry

- VMI Keydets William & Mary Tribe
- First meeting: October 28, 1905; VMI 23 – W&M 0
- Latest meeting: August 29, 2024; W&M 41 – VMI 7
- Next meeting: September 4, 2027

Statistics
- Total meetings: 89
- All-time series: W&M leads, 54–33–2
- Largest victory: VMI, 66–0 (1916)
- Longest win streak: W&M, 26 (1986–present)
- Current win streak: W&M, 26 (1986–present)

Locations of VMI and William & Mary

The VMI–William & Mary football rivalry between the VMI Keydets and the William & Mary Tribe is a match-up between two historic public universities, the Virginia Military Institute and the College of William and Mary, in the state of Virginia. While the rivalry has lost intensity since William & Mary departed from the Southern Conference in 1977, the Tribe and Keydets maintain the series through frequent non-conference match-ups. The series is the second-longest for William & Mary (after the Capital Cup with Richmond), and the longest for VMI at 88 games. The football series began in 1905 and has been played a total of 89 times as of 2024.

== History ==
The College of William and Mary was founded in Williamsburg, Virginia in 1693, and the Virginia Military Institute was founded in 1839 in Lexington, Virginia. The VMI Keydets football team was established in 1891, and the William & Mary team was founded two years later in 1893. VMI has hosted its home games in Lexington on the Parade Ground, Alumni Field, and the current Alumni Memorial Field, which was constructed in 1962. William & Mary has hosted all of its home contests in Williamsburg at Zable Stadium (known as Cary Field until 1989). The game has also been played in Richmond, Lynchburg, Norfolk, Portsmouth, and Roanoke, Virginia as well as Bluefield, West Virginia (Mitchell Stadium).

Previously, the game was a conference match up when VMI and William & Mary were both members of the Southern Conference from 1936 until 1976. William & Mary then became an independent before joining the Yankee Conference in 1993. It has since been a member of the Atlantic 10 Conference for football, and is currently part of the Colonial Athletic Association. VMI remained a member of the Southern Conference until 2001 before leaving for the Big South Conference. The Keydets, however, moved back to the Southern Conference in 2013.

The two teams have scheduled a four-game, home-and-home football series beginning in 2024.

== Game results ==
| VMI victories | William & Mary victories | Tie games |

| No. | Date | Location | Winner | Score |
|---|---|---|---|---|
| 1 | October 28, 1905 | Lexington, VA | VMI | 23–0 |
| 2 | October 5, 1907 | Lexington, VA | VMI | 58–0 |
| 3 | October 3, 1908 | Lexington, VA | VMI | 21–0 |
| 4 | October 9, 1909 | Lexington, VA | VMI | 6–0 |
| 5 | October 15, 1910 | Lexington, VA | VMI | 33–0 |
| 6 | October 4, 1913 | Lexington, VA | VMI | 33–3 |
| 7 | October 10, 1914 | Lexington, VA | VMI | 38–0 |
| 8 | October 2, 1915 | Lexington, VA | VMI | 19–6 |
| 9 | October 7, 1916 | Lexington, VA | VMI | 66–0 |
| 10 | October 7, 1917 | Lexington, VA | VMI | 53–0 |
| 11 | October 10, 1919 | Richmond, VA | VMI | 21–3 |
| 12 | November 5, 1932 | Norfolk, VA | William & Mary | 20–7 |
| 13 | November 4, 1933 | Norfolk, VA | William & Mary | 14–0 |
| 14 | November 3, 1934 | Norfolk, VA | VMI | 13–6 |
| 15 | November 2, 1935 | Williamsburg, VA | VMI | 19–0 |
| 16 | November 7, 1936 | Williamsburg, VA | VMI | 21–0 |
| 17 | October 2, 1937 | Norfolk, VA | VMI | 20–9 |
| 18 | October 22, 1938 | Williamsburg, VA | VMI | 14–0 |
| 19 | November 2, 1940 | Lexington, VA | Tie | 0–0 |
| 20 | November 8, 1941 | Williamsburg, VA | William & Mary | 21–0 |
| 21 | November 14, 1942 | Norfolk, VA | #15 William & Mary | 27–6 |
| 22 | November 18, 1944 | Portsmouth, VA | William & Mary | 26–0 |
| 23 | October 20, 1945 | Richmond, VA | William & Mary | 13–9 |
| 24 | October 26, 1946 | Williamsburg, VA | #18 William & Mary | 41–0 |
| 25 | November 8, 1947 | Williamsburg, VA | #15 William & Mary | 28–20 |
| 26 | October 9, 1948 | Norfolk, VA | William & Mary | 31–0 |
| 27 | October 8, 1949 | Williamsburg, VA | William & Mary | 54–6 |
| 28 | September 23, 1950 | Roanoke, VA | VMI | 25–19 |
| 29 | October 6, 1951 | Williamsburg, VA | VMI | 20–7 |
| 30 | September 20, 1952 | Roanoke, VA | William & Mary | 34–13 |
| 31 | November 7, 1953 | Roanoke, VA | VMI | 20–19 |
| 32 | November 6, 1954 | Roanoke, VA | VMI | 21–0 |
| 33 | October 29, 1955 | Williamsburg, VA | William & Mary | 20–13 |
| 34 | November 3, 1956 | Lynchburg, VA | VMI | 20–6 |
| 35 | October 19, 1957 | Williamsburg, VA | VMI | 14–13 |
| 36 | October 11, 1958 | Bluefield, WV | Tie | 6–6 |
| 37 | October 17, 1959 | Norfolk, VA | VMI | 26–7 |
| 38 | September 17, 1960 | Williamsburg, VA | VMI | 33–21 |
| 39 | October 28, 1961 | Williamsburg, VA | VMI | 14–7 |
| 40 | October 27, 1962 | Lexington, VA | VMI | 6–0 |
| 41 | November 2, 1963 | Williamsburg, VA | VMI | 26–6 |
| 42 | September 19, 1964 | Lexington, VA | William & Mary | 14–12 |
| 43 | September 18, 1965 | Williamsburg, VA | William & Mary | 32–21 |
| 44 | October 29, 1966 | Lexington, VA | William & Mary | 22–15 |
| 45 | October 7, 1967 | Richmond, VA | William & Mary | 33–28 |

| No. | Date | Location | Winner | Score |
|---|---|---|---|---|
| 46 | October 26, 1968 | Lexington, VA | William & Mary | 20–10 |
| 47 | October 25, 1969 | Williamsburg, VA | William & Mary | 25–17 |
| 48 | October 17, 1970 | Lexington, VA | William & Mary | 24–10 |
| 49 | October 23, 1971 | Williamsburg, VA | William & Mary | 12–7 |
| 50 | October 21, 1972 | Lexington, VA | William & Mary | 31–3 |
| 51 | October 27, 1973 | Williamsburg, VA | William & Mary | 45–14 |
| 52 | October 26, 1974 | Lexington, VA | VMI | 31–20 |
| 53 | November 8, 1975 | Lexington, VA | William & Mary | 13–7 |
| 54 | September 11, 1976 | Williamsburg, VA | William & Mary | 34–20 |
| 55 | September 10, 1977 | Lexington, VA | VMI | 23–13 |
| 56 | September 9, 1978 | Williamsburg, VA | William & Mary | 10–3 |
| 57 | September 8, 1979 | Lexington, VA | VMI | 7–3 |
| 58 | September 13, 1980 | Williamsburg, VA | VMI | 13–10 |
| 59 | September 26, 1981 | Lexington, VA | VMI | 31–14 |
| 60 | September 18, 1982 | Williamsburg, VA | William & Mary | 24–12 |
| 61 | September 10, 1983 | Lexington, VA | William & Mary | 28–14 |
| 62 | September 8, 1984 | Williamsburg, VA | William & Mary | 24–13 |
| 63 | October 26, 1985 | Lexington, VA | VMI | 39–38 |
| 64 | September 13, 1986 | Williamsburg, VA | #19 William & Mary | 37–22 |
| 65 | October 31, 1987 | Norfolk, VA | William & Mary | 17–6 |
| 66 | September 10, 1988 | Williamsburg, VA | William & Mary | 30–7 |
| 67 | September 16, 1989 | Lexington, VA | #20 William & Mary | 24–17 |
| 68 | October 13, 1990 | Norfolk, VA | #16 William & Mary | 59–47 |
| 69 | October 12, 1991 | Lexington, VA | William & Mary | 40–26 |
| 70 | September 12, 1992 | Williamsburg, VA | William & Mary | 21–6 |
| 71 | October 2, 1993 | Norfolk, VA | #18 William & Mary | 49–6 |
| 72 | September 24, 1994 | Williamsburg, VA | #8 William & Mary | 45–7 |
| 73 | September 30, 1995 | Lexington, VA | #18 William & Mary | 27–7 |
| 74 | September 14, 1996 | Williamsburg, VA | #23 William & Mary | 40–21 |
| 75 | September 13, 1997 | Lexington, VA | #3 William & Mary | 41–12 |
| 76 | September 12, 1998 | Williamsburg, VA | #13 William & Mary | 49–0 |
| 77 | October 13, 1999 | Lexington, VA | William & Mary | 35–14 |
| 78 | September 9, 2000 | Williamsburg, VA | William & Mary | 55–15 |
| 79 | September 8, 2001 | Lexington, VA | #17 William & Mary | 34–0 |
| 80 | September 14, 2002 | Williamsburg, VA | #18 William & Mary | 62–31 |
| 81 | September 13, 2003 | Lexington, VA | William & Mary | 34–24 |
| 82 | September 25, 2004 | Williamsburg, VA | William & Mary | 42–6 |
| 83 | September 10, 2005 | Lexington, VA | #11 William & Mary | 41–7 |
| 84 | September 23, 2006 | Williamsburg, VA | William & Mary | 38–6 |
| 85 | September 8, 2007 | Lexington, VA | William & Mary | 63–16 |
| 86 | September 13, 2008 | Williamsburg, VA | William & Mary | 52–17 |
| 87 | September 11, 2010 | Williamsburg, VA | #11 William & Mary | 45–0 |
| 88 | September 10, 2011 | Lexington, VA | #5 William & Mary | 24–7 |
| 89 | August 29, 2024 | Williamsburg, VA | #15 William & Mary | 41–7 |
Series: William & Mary leads 54–33–2

- Source: Tribe Athletics

== See also ==
- List of NCAA college football rivalry games
