= Virginia Tech–West Virginia football rivalry =

American college football rivalry

- Virginia Tech Hokies West Virginia Mountaineers
- First meeting: November 16, 1912; VPI 41, West Virginia 0
- Latest meeting: September 22, 2022; West Virginia 33, Virginia Tech 10
- Trophy: Black Diamond Trophy

Statistics
- Total meetings: 54
- All-time series: West Virginia leads, 30–23–1
- Largest victory: Virginia Tech, 41–0 (1912)
- Longest win streak: West Virginia, 7 (1915–1958)
- Current win streak: West Virginia, 2 (2021–present)

Locations of Virginia Tech and West Virginia

The Virginia Tech–West Virginia football rivalry is an American college football rivalry between the Virginia Tech Hokies and West Virginia Mountaineers. The teams met 53 times between 1912 and 2021, every year from 1973 to 2005, and as conference foes from 1991 to 2003 as members of the Big East Conference. The winner of the game receives the Black Diamond Trophy sponsored by Rish Equipment Company, headquartered in Bluefield, West Virginia. It was introduced in 1997 and was meant to symbolize the Appalachian region's rich coal heritage (the phrase "black diamond" is often used as a term for coal.)

West Virginia holds the trophy and leads the all-time series 30–23–1. The last game currently scheduled was played on September 22, 2022, at Lane Stadium in Blacksburg, VA; the Mountaineers won what may be the final trophy game in a blowout, 33–10. West Virginia also holds the longest win streak in the series, winning seven consecutive irregularly scheduled games against the Hokies between 1915 and 1958.

== History ==
=== Early games ===
The first game between West Virginia and Virginia Polytechnic took place in 1912, but the teams started playing consistently in 1973. When head coach Frank Beamer began leading the Hokies to success in the 1990s, the rivalry soon elevated.

The first big game of the rivalry came in 1974. Both teams were wrapping up losing seasons in Blacksburg, but neither thought the game would be so hard-fought. Then West Virginia head coach Bobby Bowden even received an unsportsmanlike conduct penalty against him for arguing a personal foul that cost the Mountaineers 30 yards. The game featured a 99-yard interception return and an 85-yard touchdown run for Artie Owens and the Mountaineers. The Hokies had two chances to hit a game-winning field goal, after a penalty on West Virginia, but missed both and lost 22–21. Only a year later, West Virginia picked up a hard-fought 10–7 win which ended with a Mountaineer game-winning field goal.

In 1979, West Virginia capped one of the greatest comebacks in the rivalry's history. Down 23–6 at halftime, the Mountaineers rallied behind quarterback Oliver Luck and his four second-half touchdowns to pull out a 34–23 come-from-behind victory.

=== 1980s ===
After West Virginia pulled off the comeback in 1979, the Hokies up-ended new head coach Don Nehlen at West Virginia. The Hokies, who eventually made it to the Peach Bowl, thrashed the legendary coach's team 34–11. Virginia Tech runningback Cyrus Lawrence ran for 173 yards, the most ever by a Virginia Tech back in the series. A defensive struggle in 1984 also highlighted the early 1980s contests. The game was won by the Mountaineers 14–7, despite being outgained 339–240 by Virginia Tech.

In 1988, en route to the first undefeated regular season in school history, West Virginia won against the Hokies 22–10. In the hardest game for the Mountaineers in that season, West Virginia battled six turnovers and 13 penalties to win. Former head coach Don Nehlen said about playing in Blacksburg, "Playing here is like airplane landings – any one you can walk away from is a good one." The following year, 1989, West Virginia lost a dramatic game to the Hokies, 12–10. The win was the first for Virginia Tech in Morgantown since 1967 (when coach Frank Beamer played for the Hokies) and the first time that the Hokies defeated a ranked Mountaineer team who was coming off of the undefeated '88 season.

=== 1990s ===
In 1991, Virginia Tech overcame the odds to beat West Virginia 20–14. Heavy rain, a 50-minute lightning delay, and a late offensive surge by the Mountaineers threatened Virginia Tech's win. But when the Mountaineers fumbled on a one-yard line handoff with 16 seconds left, the Hokies came away with the win.

West Virginia handed the Hokies payback for the '91 contest in 1993, when they again ended the season undefeated. The Mountaineers pulled out a 14–13 win, despite five turnovers and a late Virginia Tech field goal attempt (which sailed wide right). Head coach Frank Beamer, on the hot seat, saved his job by leading the Hokies to the Independence Bowl. The 1994 game was the first to be televised by ESPN. The game was a 34–6 win for the No. 14-ranked Hokies and began a winning span of three years by a combined score of 92–20.

In 1997, West Virginia ended Virginia Tech's three-year winning streak in front of 64,000 fans and a CBS television audience (the first of the series). The Mountaineers won 30–17 behind Amos Zereoué's 153 rushing yards and Marc Bulger's passing and rushing touchdowns.

One of the greatest wins in the series by the Hokies came in 1999. With Marc Bulger out for the Mountaineers, and freshman sensation Michael Vick at quarterback for the No. 3 Hokies, Virginia Tech won 22–20 in dramatic fashion. West Virginia scored the go-ahead touchdown to put them up 20–19 with 1:15 left. However, Vick led the Hokies on a dramatic drive, highlighted by a key 26-yard scramble down the sideline when it appeared he'd run out-of-bounds. Shayne Graham then hit a 44-yard field goal as time expired to preserve Virginia Tech's undefeated season and keep their national title hopes alive. They also moved up a spot, as Minnesota upset then-No. 2 Penn State 24–23 on a 32-yard field goal by Dan Nystrom as time expired in Happy Valley to become bowl-eligible earlier in the day.

=== 2000s ===
The following season after Michael Vick's dramatic comeback for the Hokies, Virginia Tech again came back to beat West Virginia. After leading 14–7 in the third quarter, the Mountaineers collapsed. André Davis, Tech's speedy receiver, scored on a 30-yard reverse, a 64-yard pass and a 76-yard punt return in the span of six minutes to lead the Hokies to a 48–20 victory. 41 of Tech's 48 points came in the second half, which was a school record.

In 2003, the No. 3 Hokies came into Morgantown and were upset 28–7. The Hokies had beaten Syracuse 51–7 previously, while West Virginia was 2–4. The game featured a 93-yard pass by Rasheed Marshall to give the Mountaineers a 21–7 lead. Marshall also scored the last touchdown on a four-yard run. West Virginia head coach Rich Rodriguez said "that may have been the most electric crowd that I’ve seen since I’ve been back here. My wife said everybody stood up and yelled from the start until the finish of that game."

In 2004, the Hokies got revenge for their upset the season before. The No. 6-ranked Mountaineers lost 19–13 in Blacksburg to a key field goal block that was taken back 74 yards to give the Hokies a 13–0 lead.

In 2005, Virginia Tech, led by Marcus Vick, dominated West Virginia 34–17 and became the only team to top them in the 2005 season.

However, in 2004, Virginia Tech officially left the former Big East Conference and joined the Atlantic Coast Conference. This caused a major break in the rivalry's yearly schedule and forced both schools to plan future matchups between the will of their athletic departments.

=== 2010s ===
Leading up to their 2012 game against James Madison at FedExField, then West Virginia athletic director Oliver Luck indicated a similar neutral site meeting could be possible between West Virginia and Virginia Tech. "In my discussions with (athletic director) Jim Weaver, our only opportunity to play a Virginia Tech might be this kind of game (referring to their game against James Madison) because they are not really interested in a home-and-home", Luck said. "It's less of a commitment."

In May 2013, Luck stated with the implementation of a College Football Playoff replacing the Bowl Championship Series in regards scheduling out-of conference opponents:

"I would love to get Pitt back on the schedule, I would love to get (Virginia) Tech back on the schedule, I would to get UVA back on the schedule, another school that we used to play a lot, and even Penn State," Luck said. "Is that possible? Well, it takes two to tango, but I think the good news is we will see some stronger non-conference schedules as we go forward."

On July 3, 2013, the two schools announced that the series would resume with a home-and-home series beginning on September 18, 2021, in Morgantown and concluding the next year on September 24, 2022, in Blacksburg. Also, on July 15, 2014, the two schools announced a neutral site game at FedExField in Landover, Maryland will be played on September 3, 2017. The future of the Black Diamond Trophy was uncertain following both schools' move from the Big East. Virginia Tech has confirmed that the Black Diamond Trophy will be up for grabs in the 2017, 2021, and 2022 games.

On September 3, 2017, the two schools once again faced each other in a neutral location after nearly a 12-year hiatus. The highly competitive matchup at FedExField in Landover, Maryland resulted in a No. 21 Virginia Tech victory over No. 22 West Virginia with a score of 31–24.

=== 2020s ===
On September 18, 2021, Virginia Tech came to Morgantown, WV with 2–0 record and ranked 15th in the nation while West Virginia was 1–1. The Mountaineers came out firing on all cylinders. After the Hokies offense stalled on their first possession, West Virginia's Leddie Brown scored on the second offensive play from scrimmage on an 80-yard TD run to give the Mountaineers an early 7–0 lead. The Virginia Tech offensive went 3 plays for −4 yards on their next drive while the next West Virginia offensive possession went 3 plays for 55 yards for another TD to give the Mountaineers a 14–0 lead. West Virginia would take a commanding 27–7 lead in the second half before Virginia Tech came back to cut it 27–21. West Virginia would end up hanging on to win the game 27–21.

On September 22, 2022, the West Virginia Mountaineers returned to Lane Stadium for the first time since 2004 and embarrassed the host Virginia Tech Hokies 33–10. West Virginia dominated in total offense (WVU 421 to VT 228), rushing yards (WVU 218 to VT 35), first downs (WVU 32 to VT 14) and time of possession (WVU 38:44 to VT 21:16). Virginia Tech QB and West Virginia native Grant Wells was 16–35 193 yards for 1 TD and 1 INT while West Virginia QB JT Daniels was 20–30 203 yards for 1 TD. West Virginia RB CJ Donaldson ran for a game high 103 yards while Virginia Tech's leading rusher only had 18 yards.

== Game results ==
Virginia Tech victories	West Virginia victories	Tie games

No.	Date	Location	Winner	Score
1	November 16, 1912	Blacksburg, VA	VPI	41–0
2	November 13, 1915	Morgantown, WV	West Virginia	19–0
3	October 14, 1916	Charleston, WV	West Virginia	20–0
4	November 10, 1917	Huntington, WV	West Virginia	27–3
5	November 15, 1952	Morgantown, WV	West Virginia	27–7
6	November 7, 1953	Bluefield, WV	No. 7 West Virginia	12–7
7	September 28, 1957	Morgantown, WV	West Virginia	14–0
8	October 25, 1958	Richmond, VA	West Virginia	21–20
9	November 14, 1959	Morgantown, WV	Virginia Tech	12–0
10	September 24, 1960	Richmond, VA	Virginia Tech	15–0
11	October 7, 1961	Morgantown, WV	West Virginia	28–0
12	September 29, 1962	Richmond, VA	West Virginia	14–0
13	November 16, 1963	Morgantown, WV	Virginia Tech	28–3
14	October 17, 1964	Blacksburg, VA	West Virginia	23–10
15	November 6, 1965	Morgantown, WV	West Virginia	31–22
16	October 1, 1966	Blacksburg, VA	Tie	13–13
17	October 28, 1967	Morgantown, WV	Virginia Tech	20–7
18	October 26, 1968	Blacksburg, VA	Virginia Tech	27–12
19	September 22, 1973	Morgantown, WV	West Virginia	24–10
20	November 23, 1974	Blacksburg, VA	West Virginia	22–21
21	October 25, 1975	Morgantown, WV	West Virginia	10–7
22	October 30, 1976	Blacksburg, VA	Virginia Tech	24–7
23	November 12, 1977	Morgantown, WV	West Virginia	20–14
24	October 14, 1978	Blacksburg, VA	Virginia Tech	16–3
25	November 3, 1979	Morgantown, WV	West Virginia	34–23
26	November 1, 1980	Blacksburg, VA	Virginia Tech	34–11
27	October 17, 1981	Morgantown, WV	West Virginia	27–6
28	October 16, 1982	Blacksburg, VA	No. 13 West Virginia	16–6

No.	Date	Location	Winner	Score
29	October 15, 1983	Morgantown, WV	No. 4 West Virginia	13–0
30	September 15, 1984	Blacksburg, VA	West Virginia	14–7
31	October 5, 1985	Morgantown, WV	West Virginia	24–9
32	October 4, 1986	Blacksburg, VA	Virginia Tech	13–7
33	November 7, 1987	Morgantown, WV	West Virginia	28–16
34	October 1, 1988	Blacksburg, VA	No. 7 West Virginia	22–10
35	October 7, 1989	Morgantown, WV	Virginia Tech	12–10
36	October 6, 1990	Blacksburg, VA	Virginia Tech	26–21
37	October 5, 1991	Morgantown, WV	Virginia Tech	20–14
38	September 26, 1992	Blacksburg, VA	West Virginia	16–7
39	October 2, 1993	Morgantown, WV	No. 25 West Virginia	14–13
40	September 22, 1994	Blacksburg, VA	No. 14 Virginia Tech	34–6
41	October 28, 1995	Morgantown, WV	Virginia Tech	27–0
42	November 23, 1996	Blacksburg, VA	No. 17 Virginia Tech	31–14
43	October 25, 1997	Morgantown, WV	No. 21 West Virginia	30–17
44	October 31, 1998	Blacksburg, VA	No. 20 Virginia Tech	27–13
45	November 6, 1999	Morgantown, WV	No. 3 Virginia Tech	22–20
46	October 12, 2000	Blacksburg, VA	No. 3 Virginia Tech	48–20
47	October 6, 2001	Morgantown, WV	No. 6 Virginia Tech	35–0
48	November 20, 2002	Blacksburg, VA	West Virginia	21–18
49	October 22, 2003	Morgantown, WV	West Virginia	28–7
50	October 2, 2004	Blacksburg, VA	Virginia Tech	19–13
51	October 1, 2005	Morgantown, WV	No. 3 Virginia Tech	34–17
52	September 3, 2017	Landover, MD	No. 21 Virginia Tech	31–24
53	September 18, 2021	Morgantown, WV	West Virginia	27–21
54	September 22, 2022	Blacksburg, VA	West Virginia	33–10
Series: West Virginia leads 30–23–1

== See also ==
- List of NCAA college football rivalry games
