= Mitchell Stadium (West Virginia) =

Stadium in West Virginia, United States

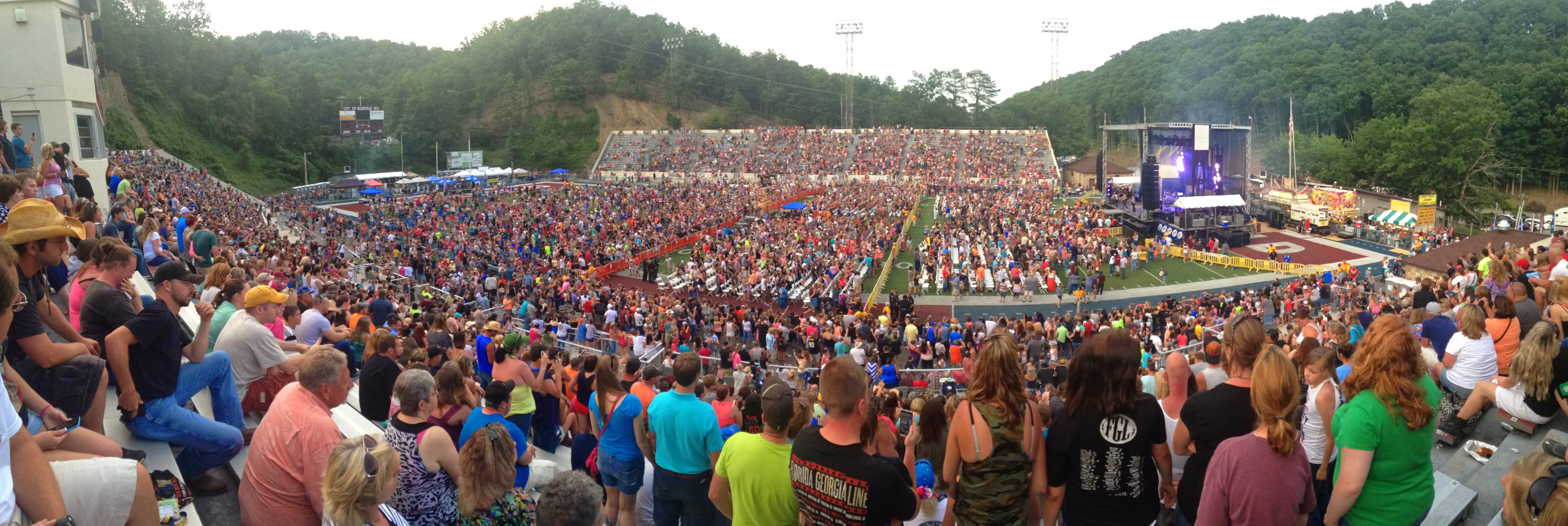
- Mitchell Stadium hosting a concert in 2014

- Location within West Virginia Location within the United States
- Interactive map of Mitchell Stadium
- Address: Stadium Drive; Bluefield, West Virginia
- Coordinates: 37°15′04″N 81°14′39″W
- Owner: Bluefield, West Virginia
- Capacity: 10,000
- Surface: FieldTurf

Construction
- Groundbreaking: 1935
- Opened: 1936
- Architect: Works Progress Administration

Tenants
- Bluefield High School (WVSSAC) 1936–present Bluefield State University (NCAA) 1936–1980, 2021–present Bluefield University (NAIA) 1936–1941, 2012–present Graham High School (VHSL) 1936–2024

Mitchell Stadium is a 10,000-seat stadium in Bluefield, West Virginia. It was built by the Works Progress Administration in 1935, and is located in Bluefield's city park that straddles the West Virginia–Virginia state line.

The facility serves as the home football field for the Bluefield High School Beavers since its opening in 1936, Bluefield University as of 2012, and Bluefield State University as of 2021.

The Bluefield Rams football team played at the stadium from 1936 to 1941, but the attack on Pearl Harbor caused the program to end. The Bluefield State Big Blue football also played at the stadium from 1936 until the program dissolved in 1980.

On June 25, 2025, Tazewell County Schools Superintendent Dr. Christopher Stacy announced that the Graham High School G-Men would relocate its home football games from the stadium to a newly turfed practice field on campus. The county indicated that temporary facilities would be provided, including portable restrooms, a press box situated on the school building, makeshift concession stands, and limited bleacher seating. Graham had been a tenant at Mitchell Stadium since it opened in 1936.

== History ==
City Manager Emory P. Mitchell would work to develop a recreation commission in Bluefield and set out to secure funds to build a city park, pool, auditorium, football field, baseball field and tennis courts.

"Of all the projects completed during the years Mitchell served as manager of (Bluefield), none was closer to his heart than the stadium," Betty Mitchell Nelson, retired dean of students of Purdue University quoted from the dedication of the stadium on October 23, 1954, in a letter she sent to the Bluefield board of directors. A school classmate had provided her with articles concerning a proposal to change the name of Mitchell Stadium, and Nelson, who retired as dean of students at Purdue after 30 years of service, shared insights as to why the city leadership chose to name the stadium for him. The dedication took place on October 23, 1954, more than three years after Mitchell's death on May 25, 1951.

"The stadium is named for the late Emory P. Mitchell as a permanent and lasting memorial to a devoted public servant who, in his lifetime, sought no praise or commendation for his efforts except the realization that his community had benefited from his work," according to the formal remarks presented at the dedication. Like her parents, Nelson dedicated her life to serving her community, West Lafayette, Ind. About 15 years ago, the Purdue University Chapter of Mortar Board created the Dean Betty Nelson Service Awards that are given annually to a student and a student organization for their excellence in community service in the Lafayette area. Nelson participated annually in the presentation which involves a certificate and a monetary award.

Nelson said that her parents showed the way for her in terms of community service. Her mother helped with meals at the YWCA and knit socks and sewed surgical gowns for the American Red Cross. "My father counted the offering after church every Sunday for years and took me with him to deliver Whitman's Samplers and bags of fruit to families of city workers who obviously had few luxuries," she said in response to an e-mail question concerning her father's commitment to community service.

Returning to the narrative from the stadium dedication: "There was one occasion during the time when government agencies were allocating moneys to municipalities for such projects, with the provision that the municipalities themselves also match the funds, that Bluefield was about to lose a large federal grant because the city had no matching fund," Nelson wrote. "Mitchell and members of his family signed a personal note that enabled the city to borrow the necessary funds to match the federal grant so that work could continue on the stadium."

Mitchell didn't start off in the city's top job. When he was 22 years old, the 1907 Bluefield City Directory listed E.P. Mitchell as serving as a bookkeeper for E.S. Pedigo. At the time, Pedigo operated a dry goods, clothing and millinery store on Princeton Avenue. Mitchell lived in a room at 806 Highland Avenue, according to information in the city directory.

In her letter to the city board of directors, Mitchell's daughter said her father held administrative positions at other Bluefield businesses before he accepted the appointment as city treasurer on August 1, 1933. Mitchell's appointment as controller of the city's purse strings came at a critical time in Bluefield's history. Bluefield, like many U.S. cities, experienced the surging economy of the so-called "Roaring '20s," and suffered the horrible economic realities that followed the Stock Market Crash in 1929, and led to the nation's prolonged economic slide commonly called "The Great Depression."

In Bluefield, it took a while for the new economic reality to sink in, and Mitchell's appointment as treasurer in 1933, President Franklin D. Roosevelt's New Deal package was in its infancy. Although it was not a popular thing to do at the time, Mitchell told the city that its budget would be more than $25,000 in the red that year unless it took drastic measures. The city shaved some expenses by shutting off every other street light and by cutting its support for the public library — handing the reigns of the library over to the Bluefield Woman's Club.

The city's elected city officials took heat for new austerity measures, but the community continued growing and needed to address ways to deal with an increasing population base. In 1935, the city took the steps necessary to address the problem related to sewage treatment and on October 22, 1935, the city used federal funds available for construction of municipal sewage treatment facilities and created the Sanitary Board of Bluefield with treatment plants in the city's East end and in Bluefield, Va. The unique two-state sewage treatment system has had its share of challenges through the years, but continues to serve residents of both Bluefields.

In the election of July 6, 1937, citizens voted for change. Popular Bluefield newsman William C. Snyder, of the Bluefield Daily Telegraph, led the ticket of a new city board. As soon as the board could reorganize, Snyder became mayor, and the board appointed Mitchell to serve as city manager. On September 6, 1937, Mitchell was formally sworn in to serve as city manager. He didn't make any friends when he recommended the installation of a novelty of the time — parking meters — to address the city's traffic challenges, and he made even fewer friends when he recommended the creation of a Parks & Recreation Commission.

In 1939, the commission recommended that the city pass an excess levy to fund improvements at the city park that would include the development of separate parks inside the city, each with their own swimming pools, to serve both the white and black citizens of Bluefield. Voters did not pass the excess levy in a special election on July 25, 1939, ultimately prompting Mitchell to personally insure the local match for the estimated $174,000 cost of the 10,000-seat stadium.

The late H. Edward "Eddie" Steele said that the city had an inside contact with the federal Works Progress Administration who was able to steer WPA crews in the direction of Bluefield to build important municipal projects. Steele did not say who the connection was, but during Mitchell's 14 years as Bluefield city manager, the city was successful in completing a number of projects, including, but not limited to, the stadium that bears his name.

During Mitchell's tenure, the city installed a police radio system; built Bowen Field and erected a grandstand; managed to bring WPA crews to the city to erect the stone retaining walls along Princeton Avenue in the East end of the city; acquired the land and built the East River Playground for $5,000, and acquired the land and built a playground on the city's North side for $17,000; and built the Scott Street Municipal Parking Garage at a cost of $500,000. Nelson added that her father felt it was important for the city to remember its history, and led efforts to acquire and remove the old Davidson cabin to make way for the construction of Park Central High School, and to restore it in the city park complex near the stadium.

"My father wanted the stadium to serve all the schools of the Greater Bluefield area," Nelson said during a telephone interview. She added that a program of all the games scheduled to be played at the stadium in 1954 included Bluefield, Graham and Park Central high school games as well as Bluefield State College games that season. " This was a stadium for all to use. I think that is something my father would have been most proud of," Nelson said.

In her letter to the city board, Nelson pointed out that history "gives richness and unique character to a city," and urged the board to leave the stadium's name as it is. "It is not old fashioned to retain public recognition of a citizen who thought Bluefield was a very special place and who worked to make it even better," she wrote. "Mitchell Stadium seems an appropriate recognition of a city manager with a vision of what the city could be." Emory Mitchell died in office in 1951 and his widow died in 1975. The family lived in a home at 1003 Heatherwood.

In 1953, West Virginia University and Virginia Tech played each other in football at Mitchell Stadium. In 2007, the two schools returned to the venue with a soccer game.

In the August 2007, new field turf was installed into the stadium by the June Shott Foundation. The same year they named the field after her. There have also been attempts to rename the stadium completely. In the summer of 2010, the Merrill Gainer Stadium Committee tried to get the stadiums name changed to Gainer Stadium in honor of legendary coach Merrill Gainer. Gainer coached at Bluefield High School from 1959 to 1967 and won four state championships. He later coached at Patrick Henry High School and won the 1973 Virginia AAA State Championship. The idea to change the name was eventually dropped because of a lack of interest from the public.

In the fall of 2011, Bluefield University resumed playing football for the first time since 1941. The Rams began calling Mitchell Stadium home in 2012. Bluefield University is a member of the NAIA in the Appalachian Athletic Conference along with being a member of the National Christian College Athletic Association. Bluefield is steeped in a tradition like few others. B.E. "Mullie" Lenoir, a former Alabama All-American would lead Bluefield to prominence, recording an overall record of 79–18–2 over an 11-year span that included their first perfect season in 1933, 9–0, including wins over Concord (WV), Salem, and Appalachian State while running back Pete Young led the nation in scoring with 128 points, prompting the popular singer/songwriter Rudy Vallée to write the song, "Mr. Touchdown USA".

In 2021, Bluefield State College (now Bluefield State University) announced it would be reinstating football at the NCAA Division II level after a 40-year hiatus. The Big Blue returned to Mitchell Stadium on September 5, 2021, losing their inaugural game 21–14 against Lawrence Tech.

== The Annual Graham/Beaver Game ==
One of the biggest games of the year is the annual Beaver / Graham game. Around 12,000 people crowd the stadium from all over to watch the game. The Beavers have a winning record over the G-Men which is 62–23–2. The rivalry is so big that highlights of the game have been shown on "Scholastic Sports America" which used to air on ESPN. The Great American Rivalry Series has covered the game in recent years. In previous years, Bluefield fans would sit exclusively on the home side of the stadium. However, both teams call the stadium home, so recently the schools have sat on the home side in alternate years.

== America's Best High School Football Stadium ==
On November 4, 2019, Mitchell Stadium was selected as "America's Best High School Football Stadium" in a poll conducted by USA Today. Mitchell Stadium prevailed in a bracket-type poll which began with a field of sixteen stadiums located throughout the United States. Mitchell Stadium's opponents were: first round – Paul Brown Tiger Stadium, Massillon, Ohio; second round – Round Valley Ensphere, Eagar, Arizona; third round – Stadium Bowl, Tacoma, Washington; and final round – R.R. Jones Stadium, El Paso, Texas. In the final round, Mitchell earned nearly 60% of the final round vote, receiving a total of 2,149,143 votes to R.R. Jones' 1,515,558 votes. Bluefield, West Virginia Mayor Ron Martin told the Bluefield Daily Telegraph that "This victory is a result of hillbilly voodoo."

== Virginia Tech Football Games ==
Virginia Tech played neutral games at Mitchell Stadium, mostly around the 1950s. One of their most notable games was against No. 7 ranked West Virginia, with the Mountaineers winning the game 12–7. They had an overall record of 6–1 when playing at the venue.

List of Virginia Tech Hokies football games at the stadium
Season	Date	Opponent	Score	Attendance	Source
1935	October 26, 1935	Washington & Lee	W 15–0	6,000	
1951	September 15, 1951	Marshall	W 18–12	8,000	
1952	September 13, 1952	Marshall	W 19–14	–	
1953	September 19, 1953	Marshall	W 7–0	–	
1953	November 7, 1953	West Virginia	L 7–12	12,300	
1955	November 12, 1955	NC State	W 34–26	6,000	
1956	September 15, 1956	East Carolina	W 37–2	6,000	

== Second Chance Rocks the Two Virginias ==
In 2011, Mitchell Stadium hosted a music festival called "Second Chance Rocks the Two Virginias." The festival was organized by partners of the Second Chance Learning Center, Erik Robinson and former MLB all-star pitcher Billy Wagner. Second Chance Learning Center gained most of the proceeds, in order to benefit area youth. The festival included country and country-rock acts, including Dierks Bentley, Montgomery Gentry, Craig Morgan, Justin Moore, Brantley Gilbert, Easton Corbin, and the local band Taylor Made. A group of teenagers also won a competition to be the opening act at the festival.

Second Chance Rocks was a success, with almost 20,000 people in attendance, and was scheduled for a second year. The revised lineup for 2012 included Eric Church, Jake Owen, Lee Brice, and Folk Soul Revival. The Second Chance Learning Center held a YouTube competition for another opening act and it was won by Andy Crawford. A Nashville-based Bluefield native, Sarah Allison Turner, also opened the festival. June 29, 2012, recorded the hottest temperature in Bluefield history. The June 2012 North American derecho hit the festival (the most costly storm in West Virginia history) shortly after Lee Brice's set, and the stadium was quickly evacuated. Jake Owen posted on his Twitter, "One of the very few nights in my career where we had to cancel due to weather. Sorry y'all. WV, we'll make it up to ya."

Owen kept his promise and came back on August 26 along with Eric Church. The concert took heat from people who had bought tickets because it was the day after the Bristol IRWIN Tools 500 and the night before the first day of school. The show went on and to the tune of a sell out and a concert was secured for 2013.

The 2013 Second Chance concert was head lined by Justin Moore, the first act to return to the concert. Other acts were Craig Campbell, Shooter Jennings, JB and the Moonshine Band, Folk Soul Revival, and Clare Dunn.
