= Alexander F. Bell =

American football player and coach (1915–1986)

Biographical details
- Born: August 12, 1915; New Kensington, Pennsylvania, U.S.
- Died: February 3, 1986 (aged 70); Bryn Mawr, Pennsylvania, U.S.

Playing career
- 1935–1937: Villanova
- Position: End

Coaching career (HC unless noted)
- 1940–1942: Loyola (CA) (assistant)
- 1946: Saint Monica Catholic HS (CA) (assistant)
- 1947–1949: Delone Catholic HS (PA)
- 1950: St. Augustine HS (CA)
- 1951–1953: Villanova (line)
- 1954–1956: Delone Catholic HS (PA)
- 1957–1959: Harvard (ends)
- 1960–1966: Villanova

Head coaching record
- Overall: 35–30 (college)
- Bowls: 1–1

Alexander Frank Bell (né Alexander Edward Belli; August 12, 1915 – February 3, 1986), also known as Frank Bell, was an American football player and coach. He served as the head football coach at Villanova University from 1960 to 1966. He compiled a record of 35–30 and took the Wildcats to two bowl games—the 1961 Sun Bowl and 1962 Liberty Bowl. Villanova won the Sun Bowl, 17–9, over Wichita, but lost the Liberty Bowl, 6–0, against Oregon State.

== Biography ==
Bell was a native of New Kensington, Pennsylvania. He played college football at Villanova from 1935 to 1937 as an end. Three years later he played for one season (1940) for the Detroit Lions of the National Football League (NFL) as a halfback. He served in the U.S. Navy during World War II from 1942 to 1945.

== Head coaching record ==
=== College ===
Year	Team	Overall	Conference	Standing	Bowl/playoffs
Villanova Wildcats (NCAA University Division independent) (1960–1966)
1960	Villanova	2–8			
1961	Villanova	8–2			W Sun
1962	Villanova	7–3			L Liberty
1963	Villanova	5–4			
1964	Villanova	6–2			
1965	Villanova	1–8			
1966	Villanova	6–3			
Villanova:		35–30			
Total:		35–30			
