= 1962 BYU Cougars football team =

American college football season

1962 BYU Cougars football
- Conference: Western Athletic Conference
- Record: 4–6 (2–2 WAC)
- Head coach: Hal Mitchell (2nd season)
- Home stadium: Cougar Stadium

1962 Western Athletic Conference football standings
	Conf.					Overall
Team	W		L		T	W		L		T
New Mexico $	2	–	1	–	1	7	–	2	–	1
Arizona State	1	–	1	–	0	7	–	2	–	1
Arizona	2	–	2	–	0	5	–	5	–	0
Wyoming	2	–	2	–	0	5	–	5	–	0
BYU	2	–	2	–	0	4	–	6	–	0
Utah	1	–	2	–	1	4	–	5	–	1
$ – Conference champion

The 1962 BYU Cougars football team represented Brigham Young University (BYU) as a member of the Western Athletic Conference (WAC) during the 1962 NCAA University Division football season. In their second season under head coach Hal Mitchell, the Cougars compiled an overall record of 4–6 with a mark of 2–2 against conference opponents, tied for second place in the WAC, and outscored opponents by a combined total of 197 to 170.

The team's statistical leaders included Eldon Fortie with 814 passing yards, 1,149 rushing yards, 1,963 yards of total offense, and 86 points scored, Bruce Smith with 230 receiving yards, and Gene Frantz with nine interceptions.

== Schedule ==
Date	Opponent	Site	Result	Attendance	Source
September 15	at Pacific (CA)*	Pacific Memorial Stadium; Stockton, CA	L 7–26	12,500–14,000	
September 22	at Arizona	Arizona Stadium; Tucson, AZ	L 21–27	25,000	
September 29	George Washington*	Cougar Stadium; Provo, UT	L 12–13	10,052	
October 6	at Colorado State*	Colorado Field; Fort Collins, CO	W 28–7	9,200	
October 13	at Utah^{Δ}	Ute Stadium; Salt Lake City, UT	L 20–35		
October 20	at Montana*	Dornblaser Field; Missoula, MT	W 27–0	6,000	
October 27	at Utah State*	Romney Stadium; Logan, UT	L 21–27	13,405	
November 3	New Mexico^{†}	Cougar Stadium; Provo, UT	W 27–0	14,273	
November 10	at Western Michigan*	Waldo Stadium; Kalamazoo, MI	L 20–28	13,000	
November 17	Wyoming	Cougar Stadium; Provo, UT	W 14–7	11,509	
*Non-conference game; ^{†}Homecoming; ^{Δ} BYU was designated home team.
