= Jim LaRue =

American football player and coach (1925–2015)

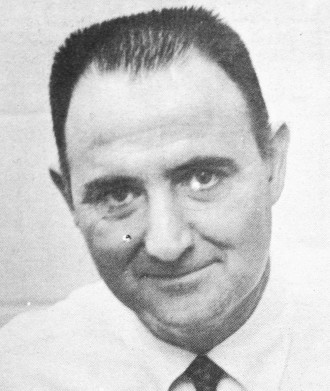

Biographical details
- Born: August 11, 1925; Clinton, Oklahoma, U.S.
- Died: March 29, 2015 (aged 89); Tucson, Arizona, U.S.

Playing career
- 1942: Carson–Newman
- 1943–1944: Duke
- 1947–1949: Maryland
- Position: Halfback

Coaching career (HC unless noted)
- 1950: Maryland (freshmen)
- 1951: Kansas State (backfield)
- 1954: Kansas State (backfield)
- 1955–1956: Houston (backfield)
- 1959–1966: Arizona
- 1968–1973: Utah (DC)
- 1974–1975: Wake Forest (assistant)
- 1976: Buffalo Bills (WR)
- 1978–1989: Chicago Bears (DB)

Head coaching record
- Overall: 41–37–2

Accomplishments and honors

Championships
- Super Bowl champion (XX); WAC conference champion (1964)

Jim Elmer LaRue (August 11, 1925 – March 29, 2015) was an American football player and coach. He served as the head coach at the Arizona from 1959 to 1966, compiling a record of 41–37–2. LaRue played six seasons of varsity football at three different schools: Carson–Newman (1942), Duke (1943–1944), and Maryland (1947–1949). He served as an assistant coach in college at Houston and Wake Forest, and professionally with the Buffalo Bills and Chicago Bears of the National Football League (NFL). He was part of the Bears staff that won Super Bowl XX 46–10 over the New England Patriots. LaRue died on March 29, 2015, in Tucson, Arizona, aged 89, from undisclosed causes.

== Head coaching record ==
Year	Team	Overall	Conference	Standing	Bowl/playoffs	AP^{#}
Arizona Wildcats (Border Conference) (1959–1960)
1959	Arizona	4–6	2–1	2nd		
1960	Arizona	7–3	3–0	2nd		
Arizona Wildcats (Independent) (1961)
1961	Arizona	8–1–1				17
Arizona Wildcats (Western Athletic Conference) (1962–1966)
1962	Arizona	5–5	2–2	T–2nd		
1963	Arizona	5–5	2–2	T–3rd		
1964	Arizona	6–3–1	3–1	T–1st		
1965	Arizona	3–7	1–4	6th		
1966	Arizona	3–7	1–4	5th		
Arizona:		41–37–2	14–14			
Total:		41–37–2				
National championship Conference title Conference division title or championship game berth
^{#}Rankings from final AP Poll.
