= 1962 Arizona State Sun Devils football team =

American college football season

1962 Arizona State Sun Devils football
- Conference: Western Athletic Conference

Ranking
- Coaches: No. T–18
- Record: 7–2–1 (1–1 WAC)
- Head coach: Frank Kush (5th season)
- Captain: Roger Locke
- Home stadium: Sun Devil Stadium

1962 Western Athletic Conference football standings
	Conf.					Overall
Team	W		L		T	W		L		T
New Mexico $	2	–	1	–	1	7	–	2	–	1
Arizona State	1	–	1	–	0	7	–	2	–	1
Arizona	2	–	2	–	0	5	–	5	–	0
Wyoming	2	–	2	–	0	5	–	5	–	0
BYU	2	–	2	–	0	4	–	6	–	0
Utah	1	–	2	–	1	4	–	5	–	1
$ – Conference champion

The 1962 Arizona State Sun Devils football team was an American football team that represented Arizona State University in the Western Athletic Conference (WAC) during the 1962 NCAA University Division football season. In their fifth season under head coach Frank Kush, the Sun Devils compiled a 7–2–1 record (1–1 against WAC opponents), finished in second place in the WAC, and outscored their opponents by a combined total of 304 to 126.

The team's statistical leaders included John Jacobs with 1,263 passing yards, Tony Lorick with 704 rushing yards, and Dale Keller with 358 receiving yards.

Gene Felker, Bill Kajikawa, Paul Kemp, Dick Mansperger, and Dick Tamburo were assistant coaches. The team captain was tight end Roger Locke. The Sun Devils finished 6-1-1 at home and 1–1 on the road. Home games were played at Sun Devil Stadium in Tempe, Arizona.

== Schedule ==
Date	Opponent	Site	Result	Attendance	Source
September 22	at Wichita*	Veterans Field; Wichita, KS	W 21–10	11,529–11,530	
September 29	Colorado State*	Sun Devil Stadium; Tempe, AZ	W 35–0	28,138	
October 6	Washington State*	Sun Devil Stadium; Tempe, AZ	T 24–24	31,015	
October 13	West Texas State*	Sun Devil Stadium; Tempe, AZ	L 14–15	26,379	
October 20	San Jose State*	Sun Devil Stadium; Tempe, AZ	W 44–8	26,940	
October 27	Texas Western*	Sun Devil Stadium; Tempe, AZ	W 35–7	22,363	
November 3	Utah State*	Sun Devil Stadium; Tempe, AZ	W 35–15	29,393	
November 10	Utah	Sun Devil Stadium; Tempe, AZ	W 35–7	24,703	
November 17	New Mexico State*	Sun Devil Stadium; Tempe, AZ	W 45–20	28,545	
November 24	at Arizona	Arizona Stadium; Tucson, AZ (rivalry)	L 17–20	28,000	
*Non-conference game

== Game summaries ==
In the season opener on September 22, Arizona State delivered a 21-10 road win against Wichita State. Larry Todd completed an 85-yard touchdown pass to Tony Lorick for the Sun Devils.

In the home opener at Sun Devil Stadium, the Sun Devils recorded a 35–0 shutout victory over Colorado State on September 29.

On October 6, ASU ended in a 26–26 tie against Washington State in Tempe. Arizona State allowed a single game school-record with Washington State's three two-point conversions.

The Devils dropped a 15–14 home contest to West Texas State on October 13.

On October 20, Arizona State rebounded with a 44–8 home win over San Jose State. Tony Lorick recorded a 73-yard punt for the Maroon & Gold.

The Sun Devils beat Texas-El Paso 35–7 at Sun Devil Stadium on October 27.

On November 3, ASU prevailed for a 34–15 home victory against Utah State.

The Devils dominated Utah in a 35–7 home win on November 10.

In the home finale on November 17, Arizona State defeated New Mexico State 45-20 for their 5th straight win.

In the Arizona–Arizona State football rivalry game played on November 24 in Tucson, the Sun Devils closed the season with a 20–17 loss to Arizona.

== Roster ==
Arizona State's usual offensive lineup included wide receiver Dale Keller, left tackle John Seedborg, left guard Bob Widmer, center Steve Fedorchak, right guard Joe Kush, right tackle Mike Krofchik, tight end Roger Locke, quarterback John Jacobs, halfback Tony Lorick, fullback Mitch Siskowski, and wingback Charley Taylor. Gene Foster, Alonzo Hill, Bob Kec, Joe Pico, Chris Stetzar, and Larry Todd were also on the roster.

== Individual and team statistics ==
Arizona State's individual statistical leaders included:

- Rushing: Tony Lorick, 105 carries for 704 yards and a 6.7 yard average;
- Passing: John Jacobs, 77 of 136 passing for 1,263 yards, a 56.6% completion percentage, 14 touchdowns, and ten interceptions;
- Scoring: Charley Taylor, 50 points on eight touchdowns and one two-point conversion;
- Receiving: Dale Keller, 20 receptions for 358 yards and five touchdowns;
- Interceptions: Charley Taylor, four interceptions for 115 yards;
- Punting: John Seedborg, 28 punts for 1,058 yards and a 37.8 yard average;
- Kickoff returns: Tony Lorick, six returns for 186 yards; and
- Punt returns: Tony Lorick, seven returns for 131 yards.

Arizona State team statistics included the following:

- Rushing: 234.2 yards per game on offense, 107.3 yards allowed per game on defense;
- Passing: 150.2 yards per game on offense, 137.9 passing yards allowed per game on defense;
- Total offense: 384.4 yards per game on offense, 247.2 yards allowed per game on defense;
- Scoring: 30.4 points per game on offense, 12.6 points allowed per game on defense;
- First downs: 202 first downs on offense, 141 first downs allowed on defense; and
- Punting: 31 total punts for an average of 39.9 yards, while opponents recorded 50 total punts for an average of 37.6 yards.

== Awards and honors ==
Two Arizona State players received first-team honors on the 1962 All-Western Athletic Conference team: quarterback John Jacobs and tight end Roger Locke. Two others received second-team honors: halfback Tony Lorick and wingback Charley Taylor.

Team awards were presented as follows:

- Tight end Roger Locke won the Sun Angel Award;
- Joe Pico won the Cecil Abono Captains Award; and
- Right tackle Mike Krofchik won the Glen Hawkins Sportsmanship Award.

After the 1962 season, Roger Locke played in both the 1962 Blue-Gray Classic and the 1963 Senior Bowl.
