= 1962 Air Force Falcons football team =

American college football season

1962 Air Force Falcons football
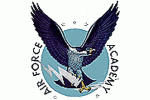
- Conference: Independent
- Record: 5–5
- Head coach: Ben Martin (5th season)
- Captain: Skinner Simpson
- Home stadium: Falcon Stadium

1962 NCAA University Division independents football records
	Conf.			Overall
Team	W	L	T	W		L		T
Memphis State		–		8	–	1	–	0
Oregon State		–		9	–	2	–	0
No. 9 Penn State		–		9	–	2	–	0
West Texas State		–		9	–	2	–	0
Boston College		–		8	–	2	–	0
Utah State		–		8	–	2	–	0
Villanova		–		7	–	3	–	0
Buffalo		–		6	–	3	–	0
Oregon		–		6	–	3	–	1
Houston		–		7	–	4	–	0
Miami (FL)		–		7	–	4	–	0
Army		–		6	–	4	–	0
Holy Cross		–		6	–	4	–	0
Louisville		–		6	–	4	–	0
Xavier		–		6	–	4	–	0
Florida State		–		4	–	3	–	3
Air Force		–		5	–	5	–	0
Montana		–		5	–	5	–	0
Navy		–		5	–	5	–	0
Notre Dame		–		5	–	5	–	0
Pacific (CA)		–		5	–	5	–	0
Pittsburgh		–		5	–	5	–	0
Syracuse		–		5	–	5	–	0
Texas Western		–		4	–	5	–	0
New Mexico State		–		4	–	6	–	0
Colgate		–		3	–	5	–	1
Idaho		–		2	–	6	–	1
San Jose State		–		2	–	8	–	1
Boston University		–		2	–	7	–	0
Dayton		–		2	–	8	–	0
Detroit		–		1	–	8	–	0
Hardin–Simmons		–		1	–	9	–	0
Colorado State		–		0	–	10	–	0
Rankings from AP Poll

The 1962 Air Force Falcons Football Team represented the United States Air Force Academy as an independent during the 1962 NCAA University Division football season. They were led by fifth-year head coach Ben Martin, and played their home games at the new Falcon Stadium in Colorado Springs, Colorado, opening with a 34–0 win over Colorado State. The Falcons compiled a record 5–5 and outscored their opponents 173–171.

The $3.5 million stadium was formally dedicated on October 20 against Oregon, which included a flyover by the Thunderbirds. This was during the early stages of the Cuban Missile Crisis, which was disclosed to the nation by President John F. Kennedy two days later on Monday.

== Schedule ==
Date	Opponent	Site	Result	Attendance	Source
September 22	Colorado State	Falcon Stadium; Colorado Springs, CO (rivalry)	W 34–0	41,380	
September 29	at No. 4 Penn State	Beaver Stadium; University Park, PA	L 6–20	45,200	
October 6	at SMU	Cotton Bowl; Dallas, TX	W 25–20	28,000–31,000	
October 13	at Arizona	Arizona Stadium; Tucson, AZ	W 20–6	27,000	
October 20	Oregon	Falcon Stadium; Colorado Springs, CO	L 20–35	33,243–33,343	
October 27	Miami (FL)	Falcon Stadium; Colorado Springs, CO	L 3–21	32,787	
November 3	Wyoming	Falcon Stadium; Colorado Springs, CO	W 35–14	26,607	
November 10	at UCLA	Los Angeles Memorial Coliseum; Los Angeles, CA	W 17–11	25,558	
November 17	Baylor	Falcon Stadium; Colorado Springs, CO	L 3–10	18,000–18,600	
November 24	at Colorado	Folsom Field; Boulder, CO	L 10–34	21,000	
Rankings from AP Poll released prior to the game; Source:

== Roster ==
1962 Air Force Falcons football team roster
Players
Coaches
Offense

Pos.	#	Name	Class
HB	45	Nick Arshinkoff
HB	20	Darryl Bloodworth
HB	27	Dick Czarnota
FB	34	John Gavin
QB	17	Terry Isaacson	Jr
E	85	Bill Landes
E	81	Ray Lennon
HB	47	John Lorber
QB	12	Allan McArtor
HB	33	Ron Murray
HB	40	Wilson Parma
C	54	Joe Rodwell	Jr
E	83	Carlton Simpson
FB	36	Larry Tollstam

Defense

Pos.	#	Name	Class

Special teams

Pos.	#	Name	Class
PK	34	John Gavin
P	17	Terry Isaacson	Jr

Head coach

- Ben Martin

Coordinators/assistant coaches

Legend

- (C) Team captain
- (S) Suspended
- (I) Ineligible
- Injured
- Redshirt
