= 1962 Washington State Cougars football team =

American college football season

1962 Washington State Cougars football
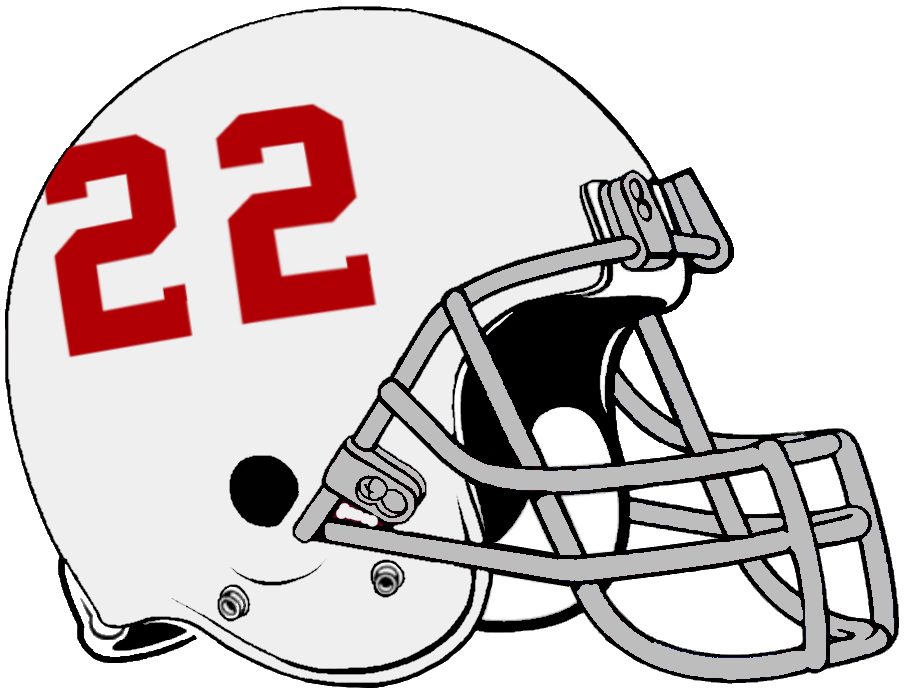
- Conference: Athletic Association of Western Universities
- Record: 5–4–1 (1–1 AAWU)
- Head coach: Jim Sutherland (7th season)
- Home stadium: Rogers Field, Joe Albi Stadium

1962 Athletic Association of Western Universities football standings
	Conf.					Overall
Team	W		L		T	W		L		T
No. 1 USC $	4	–	0	–	0	11	–	0	–	0
Washington	4	–	1	–	0	7	–	1	–	2
Washington State	1	–	1	–	0	5	–	4	–	1
Stanford	2	–	3	–	0	5	–	5	–	0
UCLA	1	–	3	–	0	4	–	6	–	0
California	0	–	4	–	0	1	–	9	–	0
$ – Conference champion; Rankings from AP Poll

The 1962 Washington State Cougars football team was an American football team that represented Washington State University in the Athletic Association of Western Universities (AAWU, Big Six) during the 1962 NCAA University Division football season. In their seventh season under head coach Jim Sutherland, the Cougars compiled a 5–4–1 record (1–1 in AAWU, third), and outscored their opponents 213 to 167.

The team's statistical leaders included Dave Mathieson with 1,492 passing yards, George Reed with 503 rushing yards, and Hugh Campbell with 848 receiving yards.

Midway through the schedule, WSU was undefeated at 4–0–1, equaling their best start since 1936. They received a vote in that week's UPI Coaches Poll (tied for 23rd), but managed only a rally win at neighbor Idaho (in the snow) in the final five games.

After three years as an independent, WSU was admitted to the conference in the summer of 1962; due to advanced scheduling, they played few of the southern members (of California) per season until the late 1960s. The AAWU expanded to eight in 1964 with the addition of Oregon and Oregon State.

== Schedule ==
Date	Opponent	Site	Result	Attendance	Source
September 22	San Jose State*	Rogers Field; Pullman, WA	W 49–8	15,300	
September 29	at Wyoming*	War Memorial Stadium; Laramie, WY	W 21–15	12,385	
October 6	at Arizona State*	Sun Devil Stadium; Tempe, AZ	T 24–24	31,015	
October 13	Stanford	Joe Albi Stadium; Spokane, WA	W 21–6	17,250	
October 20	Indiana*	Joe Albi Stadium; Spokane, WA	W 21–15	15,500	
October 27	at Pacific (CA)*	Pacific Memorial Stadium; Stockton, CA	L 12–13	11,500	
November 3	Oregon State*^{†}	Rogers Field; Pullman, WA	L 12–18	16,500	
November 10	at Oregon*	Hayward Field; Eugene, OR	L 10–28	19,400	
November 17	at Idaho*	Neale Stadium; Moscow, ID (Battle of the Palouse)	W 22–14	11,500	
November 24	Washington	Joe Albi Stadium; Spokane, WA (Apple Cup)	L 21–26	35,700	
*Non-conference game; ^{†}Homecoming; Source:

== Roster ==
1962 Washington State Cougars football team roster
Players
Coaches
Offense

Pos.	#	Name	Class
OT	74	Glenn Baker	Jr
SE	86	Hugh Campbell	Sr
HB	33	Ken Graham	Jr
QB	10	Dave Mathieson	Sr
FB	42	George Reed (C)	Sr

Defense

Pos.	#	Name	Class

Special teams

Pos.	#	Name	Class
PK	63	Al Branco	Sr
P	83	Bob James	Jr

Head coach

- Jim Sutherland (7th year)

Coordinators/assistant coaches

- Ray Blier
- Chuck Chatfield
- Russ Hampton
- Rod Enos
- Gerry Okuneff

Legend

- (C) Team captain
- (S) Suspended
- (I) Ineligible
- Injured
- Redshirt

== NFL draft ==
Two Cougars were selected in the 1963 NFL draft, which was 20 rounds and 280 selections.

Player	Position	Round	Overall	Franchise
Hugh Campbell	End	4	50	San Francisco 49ers
Dave Mathieson	Quarterback	6	81	Chicago Bears
