= 1962 Colgate Red Raiders football team =

American college football season

1962 Colgate Red Raiders football
- Conference: Independent
- Record: 3–5–1
- Head coach: Hal Lahar (6th season)
- Captain: Daniel Keating
- Home stadium: Colgate Athletic Field

1962 NCAA University Division independents football records
	Conf.			Overall
Team	W	L	T	W		L		T
Memphis State		–		8	–	1	–	0
Oregon State		–		9	–	2	–	0
No. 9 Penn State		–		9	–	2	–	0
West Texas State		–		9	–	2	–	0
Boston College		–		8	–	2	–	0
Utah State		–		8	–	2	–	0
Villanova		–		7	–	3	–	0
Buffalo		–		6	–	3	–	0
Oregon		–		6	–	3	–	1
Houston		–		7	–	4	–	0
Miami (FL)		–		7	–	4	–	0
Army		–		6	–	4	–	0
Holy Cross		–		6	–	4	–	0
Louisville		–		6	–	4	–	0
Xavier		–		6	–	4	–	0
Florida State		–		4	–	3	–	3
Air Force		–		5	–	5	–	0
Montana		–		5	–	5	–	0
Navy		–		5	–	5	–	0
Notre Dame		–		5	–	5	–	0
Pacific (CA)		–		5	–	5	–	0
Pittsburgh		–		5	–	5	–	0
Syracuse		–		5	–	5	–	0
Texas Western		–		4	–	5	–	0
New Mexico State		–		4	–	6	–	0
Colgate		–		3	–	5	–	1
Idaho		–		2	–	6	–	1
San Jose State		–		2	–	8	–	1
Boston University		–		2	–	7	–	0
Dayton		–		2	–	8	–	0
Detroit		–		1	–	8	–	0
Hardin–Simmons		–		1	–	9	–	0
Colorado State		–		0	–	10	–	0
Rankings from AP Poll

The 1962 Colgate Red Raiders football team was an American football team that represented Colgate University as an independent during the 1962 NCAA University Division football season. Replacing Alva Kelley as head coach was Hal Lahar, who had served that role for five earlier seasons, compiling an overall 24–17–4 record from 1952 to 1956. Lahar led the 1962 team to a 3–5–1 record. Daniel Keating was the team captain.

The team played its home games at Colgate Athletic Field in Hamilton, New York.

== Schedule ==
Date	Opponent	Site	Result	Attendance	Source
September 22	Brown	Colgate Athletic Field; Hamilton, NY	L 2–6	6,000	
September 29	at Cornell	Schoellkopf Field; Ithaca, NY (rivalry)	W 23–12	14,000	
October 6	Holy Cross	Colgate Athletic Field; Hamilton, NY	L 0–22	7,500	
October 13	at Rutgers	Rutgers Stadium; Piscataway, NJ	L 15–27	19,300	
October 20	at Princeton	Palmer Stadium; Princeton, NJ	W 16–15	24,000	
October 27	at Yale	Yale Bowl; New Haven, CT	T 14–14	28,232	
November 3	Lehigh	Colgate Athletic Field; Hamilton, NY	W 13–0	4,200	
November 10	at Bucknell	Memorial Stadium; Lewisburg, PA	L 14–32	4,500	
November 17	at Buffalo	Rotary Field; Buffalo, NY	L 0–6	9,280–9,289	

== Leading players ==
Statistical leaders for the 1962 Red Raiders included:

- Rushing: James Heilman, 321 yards on 77 attempts
- Passing: Gerald Barudin, 432 yards and 35 completions on 84 attempts
- Receiving: James Heilman, 126 yards on 13 receptions
- Total offense: Gerald Barudin, 457 yards (432 passing, 25 rushing)
- Scoring: Gerald Barudin, 26 points from 4 touchdowns and 1 two-point conversion
- All-purpose yards: James Heilman, 769 yards (321 rushing, 218 kickoff returning, 126 receiving, 95 punt returning, 9 interception returning)
