= 1962 New Mexico Lobos football team =

American college football season

1962 New Mexico Lobos football

WAC champion
- Conference: Western Athletic Conference
- Record: 7–2–1 (2–1–1 WAC)
- Head coach: Bill Weeks (3rd season)
- Home stadium: University Stadium

1962 Western Athletic Conference football standings
	Conf.					Overall
Team	W		L		T	W		L		T
New Mexico $	2	–	1	–	1	7	–	2	–	1
Arizona State	1	–	1	–	0	7	–	2	–	1
Arizona	2	–	2	–	0	5	–	5	–	0
Wyoming	2	–	2	–	0	5	–	5	–	0
BYU	2	–	2	–	0	4	–	6	–	0
Utah	1	–	2	–	1	4	–	5	–	1
$ – Conference champion

The 1962 New Mexico Lobos football team represented the University of New Mexico in the Western Athletic Conference (WAC) during the 1962 NCAA University Division football season. In their third season under head coach Bill Weeks, the Lobos compiled a 7–2–1 record (2–1–1 against WAC opponents), won the WAC championship, and outscored opponents, 210 to 159.

The team's statistical leaders included Jim Cromartie with 245 passing yards, Bobby Santiago with 806 rushing yards and 60 points scored, and George Heard with 255 receiving yards.

== Schedule ==
Date	Opponent	Site	Result	Attendance	Source
September 15	New Mexico State*	University Stadium; Albuquerque, NM (rivalry)	W 28–17	28,576	
September 22	at Wyoming	War Memorial Stadium; Laramie, WY	W 25–21	15,095	
September 29	Arizona	University Stadium; Albuquerque, NM (rivalry)	W 35–25	28,239	
October 6	at Texas Western*	Kidd Field; El Paso, TX	L 14–16	10,000	
October 13	Utah State*^{†}	University Stadium; Albuquerque, NM	W 14–13	28,236	
October 20	at Utah	Ute Stadium; Salt Lake City, UT	T 7–7	20,265	
October 27	at San Jose State*	Spartan Stadium; San Jose, CA	W 25–13	12,000–16,500	
November 3	at BYU	Cougar Stadium; Provo, UT	L 0–27	14,273	
November 10	Colorado State*	University Stadium; Albuquerque, NM	W 21–8	19,442	
November 17	Montana*	University Stadium; Albuquerque, NM	W 41–12	16,136	
*Non-conference game; ^{†}Homecoming
