= 1962 Boston University Terriers football team =

American college football season

1962 Boston University Terriers football
- Conference: Independent
- Record: 2–7
- Head coach: Steve Sinko (6th season)
- Home stadium: Boston University Field

1962 NCAA University Division independents football records
	Conf.			Overall
Team	W	L	T	W		L		T
Memphis State		–		8	–	1	–	0
Oregon State		–		9	–	2	–	0
No. 9 Penn State		–		9	–	2	–	0
West Texas State		–		9	–	2	–	0
Boston College		–		8	–	2	–	0
Utah State		–		8	–	2	–	0
Villanova		–		7	–	3	–	0
Buffalo		–		6	–	3	–	0
Oregon		–		6	–	3	–	1
Houston		–		7	–	4	–	0
Miami (FL)		–		7	–	4	–	0
Army		–		6	–	4	–	0
Holy Cross		–		6	–	4	–	0
Louisville		–		6	–	4	–	0
Xavier		–		6	–	4	–	0
Florida State		–		4	–	3	–	3
Air Force		–		5	–	5	–	0
Montana		–		5	–	5	–	0
Navy		–		5	–	5	–	0
Notre Dame		–		5	–	5	–	0
Pacific (CA)		–		5	–	5	–	0
Pittsburgh		–		5	–	5	–	0
Syracuse		–		5	–	5	–	0
Texas Western		–		4	–	5	–	0
New Mexico State		–		4	–	6	–	0
Colgate		–		3	–	5	–	1
Idaho		–		2	–	6	–	1
San Jose State		–		2	–	8	–	1
Boston University		–		2	–	7	–	0
Dayton		–		2	–	8	–	0
Detroit		–		1	–	8	–	0
Hardin–Simmons		–		1	–	9	–	0
Colorado State		–		0	–	10	–	0
Rankings from AP Poll

The 1962 Boston University Terriers football team was an American football team that represented Boston University as an independent during the 1962 NCAA University Division football season. In its sixth season under head coach Steve Sinko, the team compiled a 2–7 record and was outscored by a total of 156 to 94.

== Schedule ==
Date	Opponent	Site	Result	Attendance	Source
September 22	Buffalo	Boston University Field; Boston, MA	L 23–27	10,000	
September 29	Kansas	Boston University Field; Boston, MA	L 0–14	11,000	
October 6	at West Virginia	Mountaineer Field; Morgantown, WV	L 0–7	20,000	
October 13	at George Washington	District of Columbia Stadium; Washington, DC	L 6–14	5,500	
October 20	Richmond	Boston University Field; Boston, MA	L 7–14	6,472	
October 27	at UMass	Alumni Field; Amherst, MA	W 20–6	7,656	
November 3	Army	Boston University Field; Boston, MA	L 0–26	16,000	
November 10	at Connecticut	Memorial Stadium; Storrs, CT	W 13–7	5,579	
November 17	at Boston College	Alumni Stadium; Chestnut Hill, MA (rivalry)	L 25–41	23,200	
