= 1962 Colorado State Rams football team =

American college football season

1962 Colorado State Rams football
- Conference: Independent
- Record: 0–10
- Head coach: Mike Lude (1st season)
- Home stadium: Colorado Field

1962 NCAA University Division independents football records
| | Conf. | | | Overall |
| Team | W | L | T | W | | L | | T |
|---|---|---|---|---|---|---|---|---|
| Memphis State | | – | | 8 | – | 1 | – | 0 |
| Oregon State | | – | | 9 | – | 2 | – | 0 |
| No. 9 Penn State | | – | | 9 | – | 2 | – | 0 |
| West Texas State | | – | | 9 | – | 2 | – | 0 |
| Boston College | | – | | 8 | – | 2 | – | 0 |
| Utah State | | – | | 8 | – | 2 | – | 0 |
| Villanova | | – | | 7 | – | 3 | – | 0 |
| Buffalo | | – | | 6 | – | 3 | – | 0 |
| Oregon | | – | | 6 | – | 3 | – | 1 |
| Houston | | – | | 7 | – | 4 | – | 0 |
| Miami (FL) | | – | | 7 | – | 4 | – | 0 |
| Army | | – | | 6 | – | 4 | – | 0 |
| Holy Cross | | – | | 6 | – | 4 | – | 0 |
| Louisville | | – | | 6 | – | 4 | – | 0 |
| Xavier | | – | | 6 | – | 4 | – | 0 |
| Florida State | | – | | 4 | – | 3 | – | 3 |
| Air Force | | – | | 5 | – | 5 | – | 0 |
| Montana | | – | | 5 | – | 5 | – | 0 |
| Navy | | – | | 5 | – | 5 | – | 0 |
| Notre Dame | | – | | 5 | – | 5 | – | 0 |
| Pacific (CA) | | – | | 5 | – | 5 | – | 0 |
| Pittsburgh | | – | | 5 | – | 5 | – | 0 |
| Syracuse | | – | | 5 | – | 5 | – | 0 |
| Texas Western | | – | | 4 | – | 5 | – | 0 |
| New Mexico State | | – | | 4 | – | 6 | – | 0 |
| Colgate | | – | | 3 | – | 5 | – | 1 |
| Idaho | | – | | 2 | – | 6 | – | 1 |
| San Jose State | | – | | 2 | – | 8 | – | 1 |
| Boston University | | – | | 2 | – | 7 | – | 0 |
| Dayton | | – | | 2 | – | 8 | – | 0 |
| Detroit | | – | | 1 | – | 8 | – | 0 |
| Hardin–Simmons | | – | | 1 | – | 9 | – | 0 |
| Colorado State | | – | | 0 | – | 10 | – | 0 |
Rankings from AP Poll

The 1962 Colorado State Rams football team represented Colorado State University as an independent during the 1962 NCAA University Division football season. In their first season under head coach Mike Lude, the Rams lost all ten games and were outscored 269 to 66. The winless season extended the program's losing streak to 26 games, dating back to October 1960. The streak was broken with a win in the 1963 season opener.

The team's statistical leaders included John Christensen with 562 passing yards, Phil Jackson with 314 rushing yards, and John Swanson with 160 receiving yards.

The Rams opened the season at Air Force in the inaugural game at the new Falcon Stadium.

== Schedule ==
| Date | Opponent | Site | Result | Attendance | Source |
|---|---|---|---|---|---|
| September 22 | at Air Force | Falcon Stadium; Colorado Springs, CO (rivalry) | L 0–34 | 41,380 | |
| September 29 | at Arizona State | Sun Devil Stadium; Tempe, AZ | L 0–35 | 28,138 | |
| October 6 | BYU | Colorado Field; Fort Collins, CO | L 7–28 | 9,200 | |
| October 12 | at UCLA | Los Angeles Memorial Coliseum; Los Angeles, CA | L 7–35 | 22,846 | |
| October 20 | at Utah State | Romney Stadium; Logan, UT | L 0–21 | 6,484 | |
| October 27 | Wyoming^{†} | Colorado Field; Fort Collins, CO (rivalry) | L 7–28 | 11,000 | |
| November 3 | Utah | Colorado Field; Fort Collins, CO | L 8–26 | 5,900 | |
| November 10 | at New Mexico | University Stadium; Albuquerque, NM | L 8–21 | 19,442 | |
| November 17 | at Oregon State | Parker Stadium; Corvallis, OR | L 14–25 | 12,131 | |
| November 22 | Montana | Colorado Field; Fort Collins, CO | L 15–16 | 4,250 | |
^{†}Homecoming; Source:
