= 1962 San Jose State Spartans football team =

American college football season

1962 San Jose State Spartans football
- Conference: Independent
- Record: 2–8–1
- Head coach: Bob Titchenal (6th season)
- Home stadium: Spartan Stadium

1962 NCAA University Division independents football records
	Conf.			Overall
Team	W	L	T	W		L		T
Memphis State		–		8	–	1	–	0
Oregon State		–		9	–	2	–	0
No. 9 Penn State		–		9	–	2	–	0
West Texas State		–		9	–	2	–	0
Boston College		–		8	–	2	–	0
Utah State		–		8	–	2	–	0
Villanova		–		7	–	3	–	0
Buffalo		–		6	–	3	–	0
Oregon		–		6	–	3	–	1
Houston		–		7	–	4	–	0
Miami (FL)		–		7	–	4	–	0
Army		–		6	–	4	–	0
Holy Cross		–		6	–	4	–	0
Louisville		–		6	–	4	–	0
Xavier		–		6	–	4	–	0
Florida State		–		4	–	3	–	3
Air Force		–		5	–	5	–	0
Montana		–		5	–	5	–	0
Navy		–		5	–	5	–	0
Notre Dame		–		5	–	5	–	0
Pacific (CA)		–		5	–	5	–	0
Pittsburgh		–		5	–	5	–	0
Syracuse		–		5	–	5	–	0
Texas Western		–		4	–	5	–	0
New Mexico State		–		4	–	6	–	0
Colgate		–		3	–	5	–	1
Idaho		–		2	–	6	–	1
San Jose State		–		2	–	8	–	1
Boston University		–		2	–	7	–	0
Dayton		–		2	–	8	–	0
Detroit		–		1	–	8	–	0
Hardin–Simmons		–		1	–	9	–	0
Colorado State		–		0	–	10	–	0
Rankings from AP Poll

The 1962 San Jose State Spartans football team represented San Jose State College—now known as San Jose State University—as an independent during the 1962 NCAA University Division football season. Led by sixth-year head coach Bob Titchenal, the Spartans compiled a record of 2–8–1 and were outscored by opponents 261 to 133. The team played home games at Spartan Stadium in San Jose, California.

== Schedule ==
Date	Opponent	Site	Result	Attendance	Source
September 15	Utah State	Spartan Stadium; San Jose, CA	L 18–29	18,044	
September 22	at Washington State	Rogers Field; Pullman, WA	L 8–49	15,300	
September 29	at California	California Memorial Stadium; Berkeley, CA	L 8–25	31,500	
October 6	at Oregon	Hayward Field; Eugene, OR	L 0–14	15,700	
October 13	Idaho	Spartan Stadium; San Jose, CA	T 12–12	2,500	
October 20	at Arizona State	Sun Devil Stadium; Tempe, AZ	L 8–44	26,940	
October 27	New Mexico	Spartan Stadium; San Jose, CA	L 13–25	12,000–16,500	
November 3	at Pacific (CA)	Pacific Memorial Stadium; Stockton, CA (Victory Bell)	W 24–22	16,000	
November 10	No. 9 Fresno State	Spartan Stadium; San Jose, CA (rivalry)	L 14–20	15,750–16,000	
November 17	at Stanford	Stanford Stadium; Stanford, CA (rivalry)	L 9–21	22,500	
November 30	at Hawaii	Honolulu Stadium; Honolulu, HI (rivalry)	W 19–0	13,547–16,500	
Rankings from AP Poll released prior to the game
