= 1962 Arizona Wildcats football team =

American college football season

1962 Arizona Wildcats football
- Conference: Western Athletic Conference
- Record: 5–5 (2–2 WAC)
- Head coach: Jim LaRue (4th season)
- Captains: Ken Cook; Howard Breinig
- Home stadium: Arizona Stadium

1962 Western Athletic Conference football standings
	Conf.					Overall
Team	W		L		T	W		L		T
New Mexico $	2	–	1	–	1	7	–	2	–	1
Arizona State	1	–	1	–	0	7	–	2	–	1
Arizona	2	–	2	–	0	5	–	5	–	0
Wyoming	2	–	2	–	0	5	–	5	–	0
BYU	2	–	2	–	0	4	–	6	–	0
Utah	1	–	2	–	1	4	–	5	–	1
$ – Conference champion

The 1962 Arizona Wildcats football team represented the University of Arizona in the Western Athletic Conference (WAC) during the 1962 NCAA University Division football season. In their fourth season under head coach Jim LaRue, the Wildcats compiled a 5–5 record (2–2 against WAC opponents), finished in a tie for third place in the WAC, and were outscored by their opponents, 171 to 134. The team captains were Ken Cook and Howard Breinig. The team played its home games in Arizona Stadium in Tucson, Arizona.

The team's statistical leaders included Bill Brechler with 261 passing yards, Tom Kosser with 415 rushing yards, and Ken Cook with 187 receiving yards.

== Schedule ==
Date	Opponent	Site	Result	Attendance	Source
September 22	BYU	Arizona Stadium; Tucson, AZ	W 27–21	25,000	
September 29	at New Mexico	University Stadium; Albuquerque, NM (rivalry)	L 25–35	28,239	
October 6	at Missouri*	Memorial Stadium; Columbia, MO	L 7–17	42,000	
October 13	Air Force*	Arizona Stadium; Tucson, AZ	L 6–20	27,000	
October 20	at Wyoming	War Memorial Stadium; Laramie, WY	L 8–31	16,203	
October 27	West Texas State*	Arizona Stadium; Tucson, AZ	W 8–3	22,000	
November 3	Idaho*	Arizona Stadium; Tucson, AZ	L 12–14	20,000	
November 10	Kansas State*	Arizona Stadium; Tucson, AZ	W 14–13	20,419	
November 17	at Texas Western*	Kidd Field; El Paso, TX	W 7–0	8,500	
November 24	Arizona State	Arizona Stadium; Tucson, AZ (rivalry)	W 20–17	28,000	
*Non-conference game
