= 1962 Montana Grizzlies football team =

American college football season

1962 Montana Grizzlies football
- Conference: Independent
- Record: 5–5
- Head coach: Ray Jenkins (5th season)
- Home stadium: Dornblaser Field

1962 NCAA University Division independents football records
	Conf.			Overall
Team	W	L	T	W		L		T
Memphis State		–		8	–	1	–	0
Oregon State		–		9	–	2	–	0
No. 9 Penn State		–		9	–	2	–	0
West Texas State		–		9	–	2	–	0
Boston College		–		8	–	2	–	0
Utah State		–		8	–	2	–	0
Villanova		–		7	–	3	–	0
Buffalo		–		6	–	3	–	0
Oregon		–		6	–	3	–	1
Houston		–		7	–	4	–	0
Miami (FL)		–		7	–	4	–	0
Army		–		6	–	4	–	0
Holy Cross		–		6	–	4	–	0
Louisville		–		6	–	4	–	0
Xavier		–		6	–	4	–	0
Florida State		–		4	–	3	–	3
Air Force		–		5	–	5	–	0
Montana		–		5	–	5	–	0
Navy		–		5	–	5	–	0
Notre Dame		–		5	–	5	–	0
Pacific (CA)		–		5	–	5	–	0
Pittsburgh		–		5	–	5	–	0
Syracuse		–		5	–	5	–	0
Texas Western		–		4	–	5	–	0
New Mexico State		–		4	–	6	–	0
Colgate		–		3	–	5	–	1
Idaho		–		2	–	6	–	1
San Jose State		–		2	–	8	–	1
Boston University		–		2	–	7	–	0
Dayton		–		2	–	8	–	0
Detroit		–		1	–	8	–	0
Hardin–Simmons		–		1	–	9	–	0
Colorado State		–		0	–	10	–	0
Rankings from AP Poll

The 1962 Montana Grizzlies football team represented the University of Montana as an independent during the 1962 NCAA University Division football season. Grizzlies were led by fifth-year head coach Ray Jenkins, played their home games at Dornblaser Field, and finished the season with a record of five wins and five losses (5–5).

The Skyline Conference had dissolved in the summer and was succeeded by the new Western Athletic Conference (WAC); Montana was an independent this season and a charter member of the Big Sky Conference in 1963.

== Schedule ==
Date	Opponent	Site	Result	Attendance	Source
September 15	vs. Wyoming	Daylis Stadium; Billings, MT	L 0–13	7,000	
September 22	at North Dakota	Memorial Stadium; Grand Forks, ND	L 8–14	6,000	
September 29	at Utah State	Romney Stadium; Logan, UT	L 20–43	9,175	
October 6	Idaho	Dornblaser Field; Missoula, MT (Little Brown Stein)	W 22–16		
October 13	Weber State	Dornblaser Field; Missoula, MT	W 25–6	3,500	
October 20	BYU	Dornblaser Field; Missoula, MT	L 0–27	6,000	
October 27	at Idaho State	Spud Bowl; Pocatello, ID	W 22–15	4,500	
November 10	Montana State	Dornblaser Field; Missoula, MT (rivalry)	W 36–19	8,200	
November 17	at New Mexico	University Stadium; Albuquerque, NM	L 12–41	16,136	
November 22	at Colorado State	Colorado Field; Fort Collins, CO	W 16–15	4,250	
