= 1962 Idaho Vandals football team =

American college football season

1962 Idaho Vandals football
- Conference: Independent
- Record: 2–6–1
- Head coach: Dee Andros (1st season)
- Offensive scheme: Multiple
- Defensive coordinator: Steve Musseau (1st season)
- Home stadium: Neale Stadium

1962 NCAA University Division independents football records
	Conf.			Overall
Team	W	L	T	W		L		T
Memphis State		–		8	–	1	–	0
Oregon State		–		9	–	2	–	0
No. 9 Penn State		–		9	–	2	–	0
West Texas State		–		9	–	2	–	0
Boston College		–		8	–	2	–	0
Utah State		–		8	–	2	–	0
Villanova		–		7	–	3	–	0
Buffalo		–		6	–	3	–	0
Oregon		–		6	–	3	–	1
Houston		–		7	–	4	–	0
Miami (FL)		–		7	–	4	–	0
Army		–		6	–	4	–	0
Holy Cross		–		6	–	4	–	0
Louisville		–		6	–	4	–	0
Xavier		–		6	–	4	–	0
Florida State		–		4	–	3	–	3
Air Force		–		5	–	5	–	0
Montana		–		5	–	5	–	0
Navy		–		5	–	5	–	0
Notre Dame		–		5	–	5	–	0
Pacific (CA)		–		5	–	5	–	0
Pittsburgh		–		5	–	5	–	0
Syracuse		–		5	–	5	–	0
Texas Western		–		4	–	5	–	0
New Mexico State		–		4	–	6	–	0
Colgate		–		3	–	5	–	1
Idaho		–		2	–	6	–	1
San Jose State		–		2	–	8	–	1
Boston University		–		2	–	7	–	0
Dayton		–		2	–	8	–	0
Detroit		–		1	–	8	–	0
Hardin–Simmons		–		1	–	9	–	0
Colorado State		–		0	–	10	–	0
Rankings from AP Poll

The 1962 Idaho Vandals football team represented the University of Idaho in the 1962 NCAA University Division football season. The Vandals were led by first-year head coach Dee Andros and were an independent in the University Division. Home games were played on campus at Neale Stadium in Moscow, with one in Boise at old Bronco Stadium at Boise Junior College.

The Vandals suffered an eighth straight loss in the Battle of the Palouse with neighbor Washington State, falling 14–22 in the wet snow at Neale Stadium in Moscow in the season finale on November 17. The rivalry game with Montana for the Little Brown Stein was played in Missoula and won by the Grizzlies.

Although Idaho was a charter member of the new Big Sky Conference the following year, it did not participate in football until 1965, and was an independent from 1959 through 1964. Three of the four future Big Sky opponents were on the schedule in 1962: Montana, Montana State, and Idaho State.

This was the last Vandal football season, with only nine games scheduled. The following year had ten, but the last was canceled due to the assassination of President Kennedy. Idaho first played a ten-game schedule in 1959, and it resumed in 1964.

Andros, the line coach at Illinois, played and coached under Bud Wilkinson at Oklahoma after serving in the U.S. Marine Corps in World War II. He was named head coach at age 37 in February and took over for Skip Stahley, who stepped down after eight seasons and remained as athletic director. Andros' starting annual salary at Idaho was just under $12,500.

== Schedule ==
Date	Time	Opponent	Site	Result	Attendance	Source
September 22	2:00 pm	vs. Utah State	old Bronco Stadium; Boise, ID	L 7–45	8,500	
September 29	1:30 pm	Idaho State	Neale Stadium; Moscow, ID (rivalry)	W 9–6	8,448	
October 6	12:30 pm	at Montana	Dornblaser Field; Missoula, MT (Little Brown Stein)	L 16–22		
October 13	7:00 pm	at San Jose State	Spartan Stadium; San Jose, CA	T 12–12	2,500	
October 20	1:00 pm	at Montana State	Gatton Field; Bozeman, MT	L 15–33	7,400	
October 27	12:30 pm	at Utah	Ute Stadium; Salt Lake City, UT	L 21–25	11,320	
November 3	7:00 pm	at Arizona	Arizona Stadium; Tucson, AZ	W 14–12	20,000	
November 10	1:30 pm	Oregon State^{†}	Neale Stadium; Moscow, ID	L 0–32	9,500	
November 17	1:30 pm	Washington State	Neale Stadium; Moscow, ID (Battle of the Palouse)	L 14–22	12,000	
^{†}Homecoming; All times are in Pacific time

== Coaching staff ==
- Dick Monroe, line
- John Easterbrook, offensive backs
- Bud Riley, freshmen

== All-Coast ==
No Vandals made the All-Coast team or the second team; honorable mention was guard Denny Almquist.
