= 1962 Hardin–Simmons Cowboys football team =

American college football season

1962 Hardin–Simmons Cowboys football
- Conference: Independent
- Record: 1–9
- Head coach: Jack Thomas (1st season)
- Home stadium: Shotwell Stadium

1962 NCAA University Division independents football records
	Conf.			Overall
Team	W	L	T	W		L		T
Memphis State		–		8	–	1	–	0
Oregon State		–		9	–	2	–	0
No. 9 Penn State		–		9	–	2	–	0
West Texas State		–		9	–	2	–	0
Boston College		–		8	–	2	–	0
Utah State		–		8	–	2	–	0
Villanova		–		7	–	3	–	0
Buffalo		–		6	–	3	–	0
Oregon		–		6	–	3	–	1
Houston		–		7	–	4	–	0
Miami (FL)		–		7	–	4	–	0
Army		–		6	–	4	–	0
Holy Cross		–		6	–	4	–	0
Louisville		–		6	–	4	–	0
Xavier		–		6	–	4	–	0
Florida State		–		4	–	3	–	3
Air Force		–		5	–	5	–	0
Montana		–		5	–	5	–	0
Navy		–		5	–	5	–	0
Notre Dame		–		5	–	5	–	0
Pacific (CA)		–		5	–	5	–	0
Pittsburgh		–		5	–	5	–	0
Syracuse		–		5	–	5	–	0
Texas Western		–		4	–	5	–	0
New Mexico State		–		4	–	6	–	0
Colgate		–		3	–	5	–	1
Idaho		–		2	–	6	–	1
San Jose State		–		2	–	8	–	1
Boston University		–		2	–	7	–	0
Dayton		–		2	–	8	–	0
Detroit		–		1	–	8	–	0
Hardin–Simmons		–		1	–	9	–	0
Colorado State		–		0	–	10	–	0
Rankings from AP Poll

The 1962 Hardin–Simmons Cowboys football team was an American football team that represented Hardin–Simmons University as an independent during the 1962 NCAA University Division football season. In its first and only season under head coach Jack Thomas, the team compiled a 1–9 record and was outscored by a total of 206 to 72.

== Schedule ==
Date	Opponent	Site	Result	Attendance	Source
September 15	at Tulsa	Skelly Field; Tulsa, OK	L 0–39	14,000	
September 22	McMurry	Shotwell Stadium; Abilene, TX	L 6–8	7,000	
September 29	at Wichita	Veterans Stadium; Wichita, KS	L 6–13	9,662	
October 6	at North Texas State	Fouts Field; Denton, TX	L 8–29	5,000	
October 13	at Abilene Christian	Shotwell Stadium; Abilene, TX	L 6–14	7,000	
October 20	Trinity (TX)	Shotwell Stadium; Abilene, TX	W 14–6		
October 27	at Arkansas	War Memorial Stadium; Little Rock, AR	L 7–49	28,000	
November 3	at Texas Western	Kidd Field; El Paso, TX	L 6–7	7,000	
November 10	at Arlington State	Memorial Stadium; Arlington, TX	L 6–7	6,200–6,965	
November 17	West Texas State^{†}	Shotwell Stadium; Abilene, TX	L 13–34	4,000	
^{†}Homecoming
