= 1962 Texas Western Miners football team =

American college football season

1962 Texas Western Miners football
- Conference: Independent
- Record: 4–5
- Head coach: Bum Phillips (1st season)
- Home stadium: Kidd Field

1962 NCAA University Division independents football records
	Conf.			Overall
Team	W	L	T	W		L		T
Memphis State		–		8	–	1	–	0
Oregon State		–		9	–	2	–	0
No. 9 Penn State		–		9	–	2	–	0
West Texas State		–		9	–	2	–	0
Boston College		–		8	–	2	–	0
Utah State		–		8	–	2	–	0
Villanova		–		7	–	3	–	0
Buffalo		–		6	–	3	–	0
Oregon		–		6	–	3	–	1
Houston		–		7	–	4	–	0
Miami (FL)		–		7	–	4	–	0
Army		–		6	–	4	–	0
Holy Cross		–		6	–	4	–	0
Louisville		–		6	–	4	–	0
Xavier		–		6	–	4	–	0
Florida State		–		4	–	3	–	3
Air Force		–		5	–	5	–	0
Montana		–		5	–	5	–	0
Navy		–		5	–	5	–	0
Notre Dame		–		5	–	5	–	0
Pacific (CA)		–		5	–	5	–	0
Pittsburgh		–		5	–	5	–	0
Syracuse		–		5	–	5	–	0
Texas Western		–		4	–	5	–	0
New Mexico State		–		4	–	6	–	0
Colgate		–		3	–	5	–	1
Idaho		–		2	–	6	–	1
San Jose State		–		2	–	8	–	1
Boston University		–		2	–	7	–	0
Dayton		–		2	–	8	–	0
Detroit		–		1	–	8	–	0
Hardin–Simmons		–		1	–	9	–	0
Colorado State		–		0	–	10	–	0
Rankings from AP Poll

The 1962 Texas Western Miners football team was an American football team that represented Texas Western College (now known as University of Texas at El Paso) as an independent during the 1962 NCAA University Division football season. In its first and only season under head coach Bum Phillips, the team compiled a 4–5 record and was outscored by a total of 144 to 84.

== Schedule ==
Date	Opponent	Site	Result	Attendance	Source
September 22	at North Texas State	Fouts Field; Denton, TX	L 6–19	8,000	
September 29	at West Texas State	Buffalo Bowl; Canyon, TX	L 0–49	14,000	
October 6	New Mexico	Kidd Field; El Paso, TX	W 16–14	10,000	
October 13	Wyoming	Kidd Field; El Paso, TX	L 6–14	8,500	
October 27	at Arizona State	Sun Devil Stadium; Tempe, AZ	L 7–35	22,363	
November 3	Hardin–Simmons	Kidd Field; El Paso, TX	W 7–6	7,000	
November 10	at New Mexico State	Memorial Stadium; Las Cruces, NM (rivalry)	W 21–0	10,000	
November 17	Arizona^{†}	Kidd Field; El Paso, TX	L 0–7	8,500	
November 22	Trinity (TX)	Kidd Field; El Paso, TX	W 21–0		
^{†}Homecoming
