= 1962 Utah Utes football team =

American college football season

1962 Utah Utes football
- Conference: Western Athletic Conference
- Record: 4–5–1 (1–2–1 WAC)
- Head coach: Ray Nagel (5th season)
- Home stadium: Ute Stadium

1962 Western Athletic Conference football standings
	Conf.					Overall
Team	W		L		T	W		L		T
New Mexico $	2	–	1	–	1	7	–	2	–	1
Arizona State	1	–	1	–	0	7	–	2	–	1
Arizona	2	–	2	–	0	5	–	5	–	0
Wyoming	2	–	2	–	0	5	–	5	–	0
BYU	2	–	2	–	0	4	–	6	–	0
Utah	1	–	2	–	1	4	–	5	–	1
$ – Conference champion

The 1962 Utah Utes football team, or also commonly known as the Utah Redskins, was an American football team that represented the University of Utah as a member of the newly formed Western Athletic Conference (WAC) during the 1962 NCAA University Division football season. In their fifth season under head coach Ray Nagel, the Utes compiled an overall record of 4–5–1 with a mark of 1–2–1 against conference opponents, placing last out of six teams in the WAC. Home games were played on campus at Ute Stadium in Salt Lake City.

== Schedule ==
Date	Opponent	Site	Result	Attendance	Source
September 22	Colorado*	Ute Stadium; Salt Lake City, UT (rivalry)	W 37–21	25,878	
September 29	at Oregon*	Hayward Field; Eugene, OR	L 8–35	18,800	
October 6	at Wyoming	War Memorial Stadium; Laramie, WY	L 7–16	10,732	
October 13	at BYU^{Δ}	Ute Stadium; Salt Lake City, UT (rivalry)	W 35–20		
October 20	New Mexico^{†}	Ute Stadium; Salt Lake City, UT	T 7–7	20,265	
October 27	Idaho*	Ute Stadium; Salt Lake City, UT	W 25–21	11,320	
November 3	at Colorado State*	Colorado Field; Fort Collins, CO	W 26–8	5,900	
November 10	at Arizona State	Sun Devil Stadium; Tempe, AZ	L 7–35	24,703	
November 17	Utah State*	Ute Stadium; Salt Lake City, UT (rivalry)	L 6–19	15,000	
December 1	UCLA*	Ute Stadium; Salt Lake City, UT	L 11–14	11,132	
*Non-conference game; ^{†}Homecoming; ^{Δ} BYU was designated home team.
