= 1962 Liberty Bowl =

American college football game

- 4th Liberty Bowl
Villanova Wildcats	Oregon State Beavers
(7–2)	(8–2)
Independent	Independent
0	6
Head coach: Alexander F. Bell	Head coach: Tommy Prothro
	1	2	3	4	Total
Villanova	0	0	0	0	0
Oregon State	6	0	0	0	6
- Date: December 15, 1962
- Season: 1962
- Stadium: Philadelphia Municipal Stadium
- Location: Philadelphia, Pennsylvania
- MVP: Terry Baker (QB, Oregon State)
- Favorite: Oregon State by 14 points
- Referee: David H. Buchanan (ECAC)
- Attendance: 17,048

The 1962 Liberty Bowl was a postseason college football bowl game played in Philadelphia on Saturday, December 15. The fourth edition of the Liberty Bowl, it featured the Oregon State Beavers and the Villanova Wildcats, both independent programs.

== Background ==
The OSU Beavers (8–2) were led by Heisman Trophy-winning quarterback Terry Baker, and were in their first bowl game in five years as the Beavers. They ended the regular season on a seven-game winning streak, including a 27–0 win over No. 12 Stanford, a 51–22 rout of No. 19 West Virginia, and a 20–17 rally win (after trailing 17–6 at halftime) over rival Oregon. The Wildcats (7–2) were in their second straight bowl game but were a fourteen-point underdog.

== Game summary ==
Bad weather made the field frozen, and the weather never reached above 25 °F (−4 °C), making efforts at getting toward the end zone nearly futile. Although Oregon State was the clear favorite, the hometown Wildcats kept the game close. The game's only score came on a 99-yard run by Baker with under ten minutes left in the first quarter. Trapped at their one-yard line after a punt, Baker was almost sacked by Al Atkinson for a safety, but he broke free, running by the sideline and sprinting toward the end zone. Despite two chances at a chance for two more points, their conversion attempt fell short, leaving it at 6–0.

Villanova had a Billy Joe touchdown called back due to a penalty and had another chance intercepted by the Beaver defense. Baker went 9 of 21 passes for 123 yards and accounted for 250 of the team's 299 yards. This was the first bowl win for the Beavers since 1942 and the last bowl win for the Beavers until the 2001 Fiesta Bowl.
