= 1962 Utah State Aggies football team =

American college football season

1962 Utah State Aggies football
- Conference: Independent
- Record: 8–2
- Head coach: John Ralston (4th season)
- Home stadium: Romney Stadium

1962 NCAA University Division independents football records
	Conf.			Overall
Team	W	L	T	W		L		T
Memphis State		–		8	–	1	–	0
Oregon State		–		9	–	2	–	0
No. 9 Penn State		–		9	–	2	–	0
West Texas State		–		9	–	2	–	0
Boston College		–		8	–	2	–	0
Utah State		–		8	–	2	–	0
Villanova		–		7	–	3	–	0
Buffalo		–		6	–	3	–	0
Oregon		–		6	–	3	–	1
Houston		–		7	–	4	–	0
Miami (FL)		–		7	–	4	–	0
Army		–		6	–	4	–	0
Holy Cross		–		6	–	4	–	0
Louisville		–		6	–	4	–	0
Xavier		–		6	–	4	–	0
Florida State		–		4	–	3	–	3
Air Force		–		5	–	5	–	0
Montana		–		5	–	5	–	0
Navy		–		5	–	5	–	0
Notre Dame		–		5	–	5	–	0
Pacific (CA)		–		5	–	5	–	0
Pittsburgh		–		5	–	5	–	0
Syracuse		–		5	–	5	–	0
Texas Western		–		4	–	5	–	0
New Mexico State		–		4	–	6	–	0
Colgate		–		3	–	5	–	1
Idaho		–		2	–	6	–	1
San Jose State		–		2	–	8	–	1
Boston University		–		2	–	7	–	0
Dayton		–		2	–	8	–	0
Detroit		–		1	–	8	–	0
Hardin–Simmons		–		1	–	9	–	0
Colorado State		–		0	–	10	–	0
Rankings from AP Poll

The 1962 Utah State Aggies football team was an American football team that represented Utah State University as an independent during the 1962 NCAA University Division football season. In their fourth season under head coach John Ralston, the Aggies compiled an 8–2 record and outscored all opponents by a total of 273 to 139.

The team's statistical leaders included Jim Turner with 414 passing yards and 70 points scored (six touchdowns, 25 extra points, and three field goals), Roger Leonard with 348 rushing yards, and John Matthews with 223 receiving yards. Other notable players on the 1962 team included Bill Munson, who later played quarterback for the Los Angeles Rams and Detroit Lions, and Steve Shafer, who later played defensive back for the BC Lions.

== Schedule ==
Date	Opponent	Site	Result	Attendance	Source
September 15	at San Jose State	Spartan Stadium; San Jose, CA	W 29–18	18,044	
September 22	at Idaho	Bronco Stadium; Boise, ID	W 45–7	8,617	
September 29	Montana	Romney Stadium; Logan, UT	W 43–20	9,175	
October 6	at Montana State	Gatton Field; Bozeman, MT	W 41–13	7,200	
October 13	at New Mexico	Zimmerman Field; Albuquerque, NM	L 13–14	28,236	
October 20	Colorado State	Romney Stadium; Logan, UT	W 21–0	6,484	
October 27	BYU	Romney Stadium; Logan, UT (rivalry)	W 27–21	13,405	
November 3	at Arizona State	Sun Devil Stadium; Tempe, AZ	L 15–34	29,393	
November 10	Wyoming	Romney Stadium; Logan, UT (rivalry)	W 20–6	10,275	
November 17	at Utah	Ute Stadium; Salt Lake City, UT (rivalry)	W 19–6	15,000	
