= 1962 Navy Midshipmen football team =

American college football season

1962 Navy Midshipmen football
- Conference: Independent
- Record: 5–5
- Head coach: Wayne Hardin (4th season)
- Captain: Steve Hoy
- Home stadium: Navy–Marine Corps Memorial Stadium

1962 NCAA University Division independents football records
	Conf.			Overall
Team	W	L	T	W		L		T
Memphis State		–		8	–	1	–	0
Oregon State		–		9	–	2	–	0
No. 9 Penn State		–		9	–	2	–	0
West Texas State		–		9	–	2	–	0
Boston College		–		8	–	2	–	0
Utah State		–		8	–	2	–	0
Villanova		–		7	–	3	–	0
Buffalo		–		6	–	3	–	0
Oregon		–		6	–	3	–	1
Houston		–		7	–	4	–	0
Miami (FL)		–		7	–	4	–	0
Army		–		6	–	4	–	0
Holy Cross		–		6	–	4	–	0
Louisville		–		6	–	4	–	0
Xavier		–		6	–	4	–	0
Florida State		–		4	–	3	–	3
Air Force		–		5	–	5	–	0
Montana		–		5	–	5	–	0
Navy		–		5	–	5	–	0
Notre Dame		–		5	–	5	–	0
Pacific (CA)		–		5	–	5	–	0
Pittsburgh		–		5	–	5	–	0
Syracuse		–		5	–	5	–	0
Texas Western		–		4	–	5	–	0
New Mexico State		–		4	–	6	–	0
Colgate		–		3	–	5	–	1
Idaho		–		2	–	6	–	1
San Jose State		–		2	–	8	–	1
Boston University		–		2	–	7	–	0
Dayton		–		2	–	8	–	0
Detroit		–		1	–	8	–	0
Hardin–Simmons		–		1	–	9	–	0
Colorado State		–		0	–	10	–	0
Rankings from AP Poll

The 1962 Navy Midshipmen football team represented the United States Naval Academy (USNA) as an independent during the 1962 NCAA University Division football season. The team was led by fourth-year head coach Wayne Hardin.

== Schedule ==
Date	Time	Opponent	Site	Result	Attendance	Source
September 22		at Penn State	Beaver Stadium; University Park, PA	L 7–41	41,220	
September 29		William & Mary^{†}	Navy–Marine Corps Memorial Stadium; Annapolis, MD	W 20–16	20,600–20,639	
October 6		at Minnesota	Memorial Stadium; Minneapolis, MN	L 0–21	64,364	
October 13		Cornell	Navy–Marine Corps Memorial Stadium; Annapolis, MD	W 41–0	23,358	
October 20		at Boston College	Alumni Stadium; Chestnut Hill, MA	W 26–6	25,200	
October 27		vs. Pittsburgh	Foreman Field; Norfolk, VA (Oyster Bowl)	W 32–9	32,000	
November 3		vs. Notre Dame	Philadelphia Municipal Stadium; Philadelphia, PA (rivalry)	L 12–20	35,000	
November 10		at Syracuse	Archbold Stadium; Syracuse, NY	L 6–34	40,500	
November 17		at USC	Los Angeles Memorial Coliseum; Los Angeles, CA	L 6–13	51,701	
December 1	1:30 p.m.	vs. Army	Municipal Stadium; Philadelphia, PA (Army–Navy Game)	W 34–14	102,000	
^{†}Homecoming; All times are in Eastern time; Source:

== Roster ==
1962 Navy Midshipmen football team roster
Players			Coaches
Offense: Pos. / # / Name / Class; QB / / Roger Staubach / So	Defense: Pos. / # / Name / Class	Special teams: Pos. / # / Name / Class	Head coach: Wayne Hardin; Coordinators/assistant coaches Legend: (C) Team captain; (S) Suspended; (I) Ineligible; Injured; Redshirt
