= 1962 Wyoming Cowboys football team =

American college football season

1962 Wyoming Cowboys football
- Conference: Western Athletic Conference
- Record: 5–5 (2–2 WAC)
- Head coach: Lloyd Eaton (1st season)
- Captain: Bruce Wright
- Home stadium: War Memorial Stadium

1962 Western Athletic Conference football standings
	Conf.					Overall
Team	W		L		T	W		L		T
New Mexico $	2	–	1	–	1	7	–	2	–	1
Arizona State	1	–	1	–	0	7	–	2	–	1
Arizona	2	–	2	–	0	5	–	5	–	0
Wyoming	2	–	2	–	0	5	–	5	–	0
BYU	2	–	2	–	0	4	–	6	–	0
Utah	1	–	2	–	1	4	–	5	–	1
$ – Conference champion

The 1962 Wyoming Cowboys football team was an American football team that represented the University of Wyoming in the new Western Athletic Conference (WAC) during the 1962 NCAA University Division football season. Under first-year head coach Lloyd Eaton, the Cowboys played their home games on campus at War Memorial Stadium Laramie, Wyoming. They compiled a 5–5 record (2–2 against WAC opponents), finished third in the WAC in their first year in the conference, and outscored their opponents 165 to 143.

Previously the defensive line coach for five seasons, Eaton was promoted when Bob Devaney departed for Nebraska in February.

== Schedule ==
Date	Opponent	Site	Result	Attendance	Source
September 15	vs. Montana*	Daylis Stadium; Billings, MT	W 13–0	7,000	
September 22	New Mexico	War Memorial Stadium; Laramie, WY	L 21–25	15,095	
September 29	Washington State*	War Memorial Stadium; Laramie, WY	L 15–21	12,385	
October 6	Utah	War Memorial Stadium; Laramie, WY	W 16–7	10,732	
October 13	at Texas Western*	Kidd Field; El Paso, TX	W 14–6	8,500	
October 20	Arizona	War Memorial Stadium; Laramie, WY	W 31–8	16,203	
October 27	at Colorado State*	Colorado Field; Fort Collins, CO (rivalry)	W 28–7	11,000	
November 3	at Air Force*	Falcon Stadium; Colorado Springs, CO	L 14–35	26,607	
November 10	at Utah State*	Romney Stadium; Logan, UT (rivalry)	L 6–20	10,275	
November 17	at BYU	Cougar Stadium; Provo, UT	L 7–14	11,509	
*Non-conference game
