= 1962 Pacific Tigers football team =

American college football season

1962 Pacific Tigers football
- Conference: Independent
- Record: 5–5
- Head coach: John Rohde (2nd season)
- Home stadium: Pacific Memorial Stadium

1962 NCAA University Division independents football records
| | Conf. | | | Overall |
| Team | W | L | T | W | | L | | T |
|---|---|---|---|---|---|---|---|---|
| Memphis State | | – | | 8 | – | 1 | – | 0 |
| Oregon State | | – | | 9 | – | 2 | – | 0 |
| No. 9 Penn State | | – | | 9 | – | 2 | – | 0 |
| West Texas State | | – | | 9 | – | 2 | – | 0 |
| Boston College | | – | | 8 | – | 2 | – | 0 |
| Utah State | | – | | 8 | – | 2 | – | 0 |
| Villanova | | – | | 7 | – | 3 | – | 0 |
| Buffalo | | – | | 6 | – | 3 | – | 0 |
| Oregon | | – | | 6 | – | 3 | – | 1 |
| Houston | | – | | 7 | – | 4 | – | 0 |
| Miami (FL) | | – | | 7 | – | 4 | – | 0 |
| Army | | – | | 6 | – | 4 | – | 0 |
| Holy Cross | | – | | 6 | – | 4 | – | 0 |
| Louisville | | – | | 6 | – | 4 | – | 0 |
| Xavier | | – | | 6 | – | 4 | – | 0 |
| Florida State | | – | | 4 | – | 3 | – | 3 |
| Air Force | | – | | 5 | – | 5 | – | 0 |
| Montana | | – | | 5 | – | 5 | – | 0 |
| Navy | | – | | 5 | – | 5 | – | 0 |
| Notre Dame | | – | | 5 | – | 5 | – | 0 |
| Pacific (CA) | | – | | 5 | – | 5 | – | 0 |
| Pittsburgh | | – | | 5 | – | 5 | – | 0 |
| Syracuse | | – | | 5 | – | 5 | – | 0 |
| Texas Western | | – | | 4 | – | 5 | – | 0 |
| New Mexico State | | – | | 4 | – | 6 | – | 0 |
| Colgate | | – | | 3 | – | 5 | – | 1 |
| Idaho | | – | | 2 | – | 6 | – | 1 |
| San Jose State | | – | | 2 | – | 8 | – | 1 |
| Boston University | | – | | 2 | – | 7 | – | 0 |
| Dayton | | – | | 2 | – | 8 | – | 0 |
| Detroit | | – | | 1 | – | 8 | – | 0 |
| Hardin–Simmons | | – | | 1 | – | 9 | – | 0 |
| Colorado State | | – | | 0 | – | 10 | – | 0 |
Rankings from AP Poll

The 1962 Pacific Tigers football team represented the University of the Pacific (UOP) as an independent during the 1962 NCAA University Division football season. Led by second-year head coach John Rohde, the Tigers compiled a record of 5–5 and were outscored by opponents 187 to 180. The team played home games at Pacific Memorial Stadium in Stockton, California.

== Schedule ==
| Date | Opponent | Site | Result | Attendance | Source |
|---|---|---|---|---|---|
| September 15 | BYU | Pacific Memorial Stadium; Stockton, CA | W 26–7 | 12,500–14,000 | |
| September 22 | at New Mexico State | Memorial Stadium; Las Cruces, NM | L 6–28 | | |
| September 29 | Santa Clara | Pacific Memorial Stadium; Stockton, CA | W 28–6 | 9,500 | |
| October 6 | San Diego Marines (Note: The Marine Corps Recruit Depot (MCRD) in San Diego fielded a team that played against colleges and other military teams from 1922 to 1964.) | Pacific Memorial Stadium; Stockton, CA | W 14–7 | 6,000 | |
| October 13 | at Los Angeles State | L.A. State Stadium; Los Angeles, CA | W 34–13 | 3,400 | |
| October 20 | at Oregon State | Parker Stadium; Corvallis, OR | L 6–40 | 12,021 | |
| October 27 | Washington State | Pacific Memorial Stadium; Stockton, CA | W 13–12 | 11,500 | |
| November 3 | San Jose State | Pacific Memorial Stadium; Stockton, CA (Victory Bell) | L 22–24 | 16,000 | |
| November 10 | at San Diego State | Aztec Bowl; San Diego, CA | L 18–32 | 12,500–12,700 | |
| November 17 | at No. 6 Fresno State | Ratcliffe Stadium; Fresno, CA | L 13–18 | 12,000 | |
Rankings from AP Poll released prior to the game; Source:

== Team players in the AFL/NFL ==
The following University of the Pacific players were selected in the 1963 NFL draft.

| Player | Position | Round | Overall | NFL team |
| Roy Williams | Defensive tackle | 2 | 27 | Detroit Lions |

The following University of the Pacific players were selected in the 1963 AFL draft.

| Player | Position | Round | Overall | AFL team |
| Roy Williams | Defensive tackle | 4 | 26 | San Diego Chargers |

The following finished their college career at Pacific, were not drafted, but played in the AFL starting with the 1963 season.

| Player | Position | First AFL team |
| Herman Urenda | End, defensive back | 1963 Oakland Raiders |
