= 1962 Oregon State Beavers football team =

American college football season

1962 Oregon State Beavers football

Liberty Bowl champion

Liberty Bowl, W 6–0 vs. Villanova
- Conference: Independent

Ranking
- Coaches: No. 16
- Record: 9–2
- Head coach: Tommy Prothro (8th season)
- Captain: George Gnoss
- Home stadium: Parker Stadium; Multnomah Stadium

1962 NCAA University Division independents football records
	Conf.			Overall
Team	W	L	T	W		L		T
Memphis State		–		8	–	1	–	0
Oregon State		–		9	–	2	–	0
No. 9 Penn State		–		9	–	2	–	0
West Texas State		–		9	–	2	–	0
Boston College		–		8	–	2	–	0
Utah State		–		8	–	2	–	0
Villanova		–		7	–	3	–	0
Buffalo		–		6	–	3	–	0
Oregon		–		6	–	3	–	1
Houston		–		7	–	4	–	0
Miami (FL)		–		7	–	4	–	0
Army		–		6	–	4	–	0
Holy Cross		–		6	–	4	–	0
Louisville		–		6	–	4	–	0
Xavier		–		6	–	4	–	0
Florida State		–		4	–	3	–	3
Air Force		–		5	–	5	–	0
Montana		–		5	–	5	–	0
Navy		–		5	–	5	–	0
Notre Dame		–		5	–	5	–	0
Pacific (CA)		–		5	–	5	–	0
Pittsburgh		–		5	–	5	–	0
Syracuse		–		5	–	5	–	0
Texas Western		–		4	–	5	–	0
New Mexico State		–		4	–	6	–	0
Colgate		–		3	–	5	–	1
Idaho		–		2	–	6	–	1
San Jose State		–		2	–	8	–	1
Boston University		–		2	–	7	–	0
Dayton		–		2	–	8	–	0
Detroit		–		1	–	8	–	0
Hardin–Simmons		–		1	–	9	–	0
Colorado State		–		0	–	10	–	0
Rankings from AP Poll

The 1962 Oregon State Beavers football team represented Oregon State University as an independent during the 1962 NCAA University Division football season. In their eighth season under head coach Tommy Prothro, the Beavers compiled a 9–2 record and outscored their opponents 279 to 148. They played three home games on campus at Parker Stadium in Corvallis and three at Multnomah Stadium in Portland.

Quarterback Terry Baker won the Heisman Trophy, Maxwell Award, and was the Sports Illustrated Sportsman of the Year. The team captain was guard George Gnoss and the Beavers won the Liberty Bowl over Villanova in Philadelphia.

The Pacific Coast Conference (PCC) disbanded in the spring of 1959; this was the fourth of five years that Oregon State and Oregon competed as independents.

== Schedule ==
Date	Opponent	Rank	Site	TV	Result	Attendance	Source
September 22	vs. Iowa State		Multnomah Stadium; Portland, OR		W 39–35	30,430	
September 29	at Iowa		Iowa Stadium; Iowa City, IA		L 8–28	54,400	
October 6	at No. 12 Stanford		Stanford Stadium; Stanford, CA		W 27–0	26,500	
October 13	vs. No. 7 Washington		Multnomah Stadium; Portland, OR		L 13–14	30,030	
October 20	Pacific (CA)		Parker Stadium; Corvallis, OR		W 40–6	12,021	
October 27	vs. No. 19 West Virginia		Multnomah Stadium; Portland, OR		W 51–22	17,469	
November 3	at Washington State	No. 24	Rogers Field; Pullman, WA		W 18–12	16,500	
November 10	at Idaho		Neale Stadium; Moscow, ID		W 32–0	9,500	
November 17	Colorado State^{†}	No. 18	Parker Stadium; Corvallis, OR		W 25–14	12,131	
November 24	Oregon		Parker Stadium; Corvallis, OR (rivalry)		W 20–17	28,447	
December 15	vs. Villanova	No. 16	Philadelphia Municipal Stadium; Philadelphia, PA (Liberty Bowl)	NBC	W 6–0	17,048	
^{†}Homecoming; Rankings from Coaches Poll released prior to the game; Source:

== Game summaries ==
=== Before the season ===
The Pacific Coast Conference dissolved in the spring of 1959. That year California, Southern California, Stanford, UCLA, and Washington formed the Athletic Association of Western Universities (AAWU), or Big Five. 1962 Washington State joined the AAWU in 1962, which became primarily known as the Big Six. Oregon State was an independent for a fourth consecutive year in 1962.

The Beavers' quarterback was Terry Baker, heavily recruited to play football, basketball, and baseball, but came to Oregon State on a basketball scholarship. He walked on to the football team in 1960 after head coach Tommy Prothro invited him to drop baseball and attend spring drills. Baker was the backup halfback in 1960 but still amassed 302 total yards in a 30–29 loss to Washington and 1,473 total yards in 1960, both Beaver records. In order to maximize his talent, Prothro made Baker the quarterback and scrapped the single wing in 1961 in favor of the T formation. Because of an injury to backup Rich Brooks in 1961, Baker was instructed not to run until the final ten minutes of any game. As a result, Baker wound up gaining fewer yards in 1961 than in 1960 but was still eleventh in the nation in total yards.

Because of injuries, the line only averaged 205 pounds (93 kg), more than 35 pounds (16 kg) less than some of the other lines that they squared off against. The line was nicknamed "the Light Brigade" after the "Charge of the Light Brigade" poem drafted by Alfred, Lord Tennyson.

Prothro did not like having backs or receivers be captains, because he felt that they got enough glory. Guard George Gnoss was the team captain in 1962.

A rule change in 1962 allowed teams to down the football after a punt inside the opponent's 10. Previously, doing so resulted in a touchback.

=== Iowa State ===
	1	2	3	4	Total
Cyclones	7	14	7	7	35
Beavers	0	13	6	20	39

The Iowa State-Oregon State game featured three intriguing story lines. The first was that the Cyclones' coach, Clay Stapleton, was an assistant coach in Corvallis under Prothro from 1955 to 1957. Prothro had changed Oregon State's offense from a single wing to a T formation in 1961. In 1962, Stapleton installed a winged T at Iowa State. The second story line was the battle between two potential All-Americans: the Cyclones' Dave Hoppmann and the Beavers' Baker. The game was a passing of the torch, of sorts, as Hoppmann led the nation in total yardage in 1961 and Baker led the nation in total yardage in 1962. Despite finishing 11th in total yardage in 1961, Baker still led Hoppmann by seven career total yards. Baker entered the game 161 total yards short of the Oregon State career record, held by Ken Carpenter. The third was junior Vern Burke making his first start at split end for the Beavers.

Hoppmann opened scoring with a 48-yard first quarter run to put Iowa State up 7–0. Midway through the second quarter, Baker knotted the score at seven after a two-yard touchdown run. Later in the quarter, the Cyclones had fourth-and-goal from the one-foot line but fumbled. A weak Oregon State punt gave Iowa State the ball at the Beaver 30. Five plays later, the Cyclones were up 14–7. Iowa State converted an Oregon State fumble into a 21–7 lead. Oregon State got the ball back at their own 38 with 1:40 left. The Beavers drove 62 yards, the final 31, coming on a Baker-to-Burke touchdown pass with two seconds left in the first half to pull Oregon State within eight at halftime.

Hoppmann came out in the second half, throwing three straight passes to Dick Limerick, the final one a 12-yard touchdown pass to put the Cyclones up 28–13 with more than 12 minutes left in the third quarter. Six minutes later, Baker responded with a 42-yard run to cut Iowa State's lead to nine. In the fourth quarter, the Beavers drove 70 yards on 14 plays, the final yard on a fourth-down Baker run with 11 minutes left to pull Oregon State within two. Fullback Rich Brooks gave Oregon State the ball at the Cyclone 14 after an interception. Three plays later, Baker hit Burke for a 10-yard touchdown pass to give the Beavers a 33–28 lead. Shortly thereafter, Limerick turned a short pass into a 58-yard touchdown to put Iowa State up 35–33. With two minutes left, an Oregon State drive ended at the Iowa State 20. Steve Clark's 37-yard field goal attempt was blocked, the Cyclones' second blocked field goal attempt of the quarter. However, the Beavers had all three timeouts. Oregon State held Iowa State for no gain on a third-and-one, and the Cyclones were forced to punt. The Beavers got the ball back at their own 36 with 1:07 left. Because intentionally spiking the ball was not legal at the time, Burke intentionally dropped multiple passes on the drive to preserve time. Oregon State drove to the Iowa State 43. Baker looked at Burke, but threw to Jerry Neil, who caught the ball at the Iowa State five and ran into the end zone for a 43-yard touchdown with 29 seconds left. The Cyclones could not answer the touchdown strike. Despite the fact that the Beavers only led for less than five minutes in the entire game, Oregon State won 39–35.

The Beaver win is the only meeting ever between Oregon State and Iowa State, and Hoppmann finished with 230 total yards, two rushing touchdowns, and a passing touchdown. Baker finished with 317 total yards, three rushing touchdowns, and three passing touchdowns. The 317 total yards broke his own Oregon State single game record, and Baker's six total touchdowns set a Beaver record. It also gave him 3,020 career total yards, another Oregon State record. Burke caught 12 passes for 165 yards and two touchdowns. Burke set Beaver records for receptions and receiving yards in a single game.

=== Iowa ===
	1	2	3	4	Total
Beavers	0	0	0	8	8
Hawkeyes	13	8	7	0	28

In the seventeen seasons from 1956 to 1972, Oregon State and Iowa played twelve times, more than Oregon State played conference opponents California and UCLA in the same period. The Hawkeyes won the first three meetings. Two Beaver starters on the offensive line—John Farrell and Tom Holley—were unable to make the trip, due to injury. Jerry Neil, who caught the winning touchdown against Iowa State was converted into a tackle to add depth on the offensive line. Iowa hopped out to a 13–0 first quarter lead. In the second quarter, the Hawkeyes scored on a 36-yard touchdown pass. Iowa lined up for an extra point but faked it for a two-point conversion and a 21–0 Hawkeye lead. The teams traded touchdowns in the second half.

=== Stanford ===
	1	2	3	4	Total
Beavers	0	15	0	12	27
Indians	0	0	0	0	0

In 1961, Stanford beat Oregon State 34–0 in Corvallis. It was the Beavers' worst loss in Corvallis between 1954 (against a UCLA squad that went on probation the following year for paying players) and 1972 (the second year of "the Streak"). Prothro accused the 1961 team of "quitting." The week before the Beavers and Indians met in 1962, undefeated Stanford beat sixth-ranked Michigan State. Stanford's line outweighed Oregon State's line by an average of 37 pounds (17 kg), nd the Indians were six-point favorites.

Stanford was the only team to threaten in the first quarter, but the Indians' 45-yard field goal attempt hit the crossbar. The near miss seemed to jump start Oregon State's offense. Shortly after the second quarter began, Baker hit Burke for a 34-yard gain and first down at the Stanford nine. Two plays later, Baker ran in untouched for a touchdown. The Indians were offside on the extra point, so the Beavers went for it. Baker went off right tackle for a two-point conversion. On an ensuing drive, Oregon State faced fourth-and-goal at the one. Baker went over right tackle for another touchdown with 18 seconds left in the first half. Tim Ankerson's extra point was good to give the Beavers a 15–0 first half lead.

In the fourth quarter, Dan Espalin scored a touchdown on a 16-yard interception return. The extra point was blocked, making the score 21–0 Beavers. After Stanford turned the ball over on downs at their own 42, Baker was replaced by second-string quarterback Gordon Queen. On third-and-ten at the Indian 15, Queen hit Len Frketich for a touchdown with 11 seconds left. The two-point conversion failed, giving Oregon State a 27–0 win. Baker completed 11 of 15 passes for 175 yards. He also gained an additional 42 rushing yards, for 217 total yards. Stanford had 206 combined total yards. Prothro said that Baker was "not only the greatest player in the country" but that he had never seen any other quarterback that was close. Burke caught eight passes for 107 yards. The 27–0 victory was the Beavers' largest ever over the Indians. In fact, it was the first time Oregon State had managed to tally 27 points against Stanford. It remains the Beavers' most lopsided victory at Stanford.

=== Washington ===
	1	2	3	4	Total
Huskies	0	7	0	7	14
Beavers	0	13	0	0	13

In between 1925 and 1965, Washington did not play a game in Oregon south of Portland, just across the river from Washington, muting much of the home field advantage Oregon State otherwise enjoyed. The Huskies started the season playing Purdue, Illinois, and Kansas State and were undefeated against that slate. Washington was ranked seventh in the AP poll and sixth in the UPI poll. The recent Beaver-Husky battles had been close. In the past four meetings, each team had two wins, and the four games were decided by a combined margin of thirteen points. In Washington's last four visits to Portland, the Huskies had also gone 2–2. In those games, the combined margin of victory was a mere five points. Despite the recent close contests, the Huskies entered as 6½-point favorites.

Until 1971, Columbus Day was celebrated on October 12. In 1962, it fell on a Friday, the day before the Washington-Oregon State game. At approximately five o'clock in the afternoon, the Columbus Day Storm, the strongest 20th-century extratropical cyclone in the United States, struck. At Cape Blanco on the Oregon Coast, winds reached 179 miles per hour (288 km/h) before the weather station was destroyed. The person in charge of the station estimated that the wind exceeded 195 mph (314 km/h); winds were milder in Portland but still exceeded 120 mph (190 km/h). As the front passed Portland, the temperature increased 10 °F (6 °C) in ten minutes, and the winds wrought havoc at Multnomah Stadium. A portion of the roof had flown off and destroyed several seats. Long-distance lines were severed throughout the western half of the state, and most local television and radio stations were knocked out of commission. Once the storm died down, clean-up crews began removing debris from the field. The field was in such bad shape that clean-up crews were still removing debris early in the game. Multnomah Stadium did not regain power until after the game had ended. The teams dressed and undressed by candlelight, and the scoreboard remained out for the entire game. The press described the field conditions as "turf resting on water."

In the second quarter, Oregon State drove 80 yards for a touchdown. Three Baker passes to Vern Burke accounted for 55 of those yards, including the six-yard touchdown. Washington knotted the score at seven after Junior Coffey's 43-yard touchdown run. The Huskies did not break the Beaver 30-yard line again until the fourth quarter. Oregon State responded with a 95-yard drive. Baker accounted for 104 yards on the drive, 66 rushing on two carries and 38 passing on three completions. Baker's final 10-yard pass to Burke with 20 seconds left gave each their second touchdown of the game. However, Steve Clark's kick was wide, so the Beavers led 13–7 at halftime.

In the third quarter, Oregon State's Jim Funston recovered a fumble at the Washington 14. The Beavers brought in an extra lineman to try to run a trick play. The ball sailed over Baker's head and the Huskies' Rick Redman recovered the fumble to end the Beavers' last real threat of the game. In the fourth quarter, the Huskies drove to the Oregon State 13, before turning the ball over on downs at the Beavers' 22. With time running out, Washington recovered a Beaver fumble at the Husky 40. On third-and-six at the Beavers' 45, Washington's Gary Clark and Oregon State's Leroy Whittle came down with a ball. Prothro thought it was an interception, but the referees ruled it a completion at the Oregon State 25. After the Huskies got to the 13, Charley Mitchell carried the ball three consecutive times to score a touchdown. Washington converted on its second extra point to win, 14–13.

=== Pacific (CA) ===
	1	2	3	4	Total
Tigers	0	6	0	0	6
Beavers	7	19	8	6	40

The Oregon State-Pacific game was the Beavers' first game of the season in Corvallis. The Beavers and Tigers last met in 1955, a 13–7 Pacific victory. The Tigers were 4–1 with a 26–7 victory over Brigham Young. Pacific's line outweighed Oregon State's line. In the first twelve minutes of the game, both teams were held scoreless. In the next twelve minutes, Baker threw four touchdown passes, three to Burke and one to Olvin Moreland. After Baker's fourth touchdown pass, the Beavers began to substitute. The Tigers finally crossed midfield for the first time with 2:30 minutes left in the first half. Pacific converted the drive into a 14-yard touchdown pass from Jack Sparrow to Ted Watkins with 10 seconds left in the first half to cut Oregon State's lead to 26–6. The Beavers put together a 71-yard third-quarter touchdown drive. Baker re-entered the game to throw a two-point conversion to Burke. Oregon State finished with five passing touchdowns, the most in Beaver history. Baker finished with 186 total yards. Burke caught five passes for 112 yards. The five receptions gave Burke 37 on the year, a new Oregon State season record in just five games. The three touchdown receptions and 20 total points also set Oregon State single game records. The Beavers and Tigers did not meet again until 1993.

=== West Virginia ===
	1	2	3	4	Total
Mountaineers	0	6	16	0	22
Beavers	15	22	7	7	51

On Monday, October 22, 1962, President John F. Kennedy announced to the world that the United States had discovered Soviet nuclear missiles on Cuba and that the America would quarantine the island nation in what has come to be known as the Cuban Missile Crisis. Despite the international intrigue, both Oregon State and West Virginia made the trip to Portland. Oregon State and West Virginia's only previous meeting was on Thanksgiving Day in 1930 in Soldier Field. Oregon State won 12–0. In their first three games, West Virginia outscored Vanderbilt, Virginia Tech, and Boston University a combined 47–0. West Virginia then upset Pittsburgh 15–8 in Pittsburgh. The Saturday before the Mountaineers traveled to Portland, they beat George Washington to run their record to 5–0. West Virginia's line was larger than Oregon State's line. In order to stop the Oregon State's offense, West Virginia's strategy was to double-team Burke.

Oregon State's Leroy Whittle muffed the opening kickoff at the six. However, Whittle recovered the fumble and returned it 25 yards to the 31. The Beavers rushed for 66 yards to the Mountaineer three. Baker then hit Burke for a three-yard touchdown, Oregon State's first completion of the game. Baker swept around left end for a two-point conversion. On the Beavers' second possession, Baker ran for 23 yards to the four. From there, Bruce Williams ran for four yards and a touchdown. Steve Clark kicked the extra point for a 15–0 Oregon State lead. West Virginia responded by scoring a touchdown on a seven-yard pass from Dick Jones to Gene Heeter with 9:58 left in the first half. The two-point conversion pass from Jones to Heeter fell incomplete. Whittle fumbled the ensuing kickoff. The Beavers drove 58 yards to the Mountaineer nine. A holding call pushed Oregon State back to the 24. Baker then hit Whittle for a 24-yard touchdown. Clark kicked his second extra point for a 22–6 Beaver lead. West Virginia's next drive ended in a punt, which Whittle misjudged, pinning Oregon State at their own 30. On the next play, Whittle ran for a 70-yard touchdown. The Beavers lined up for an extra point, but Baker fumbled the snap. Baker recovered the fumble and hit Burke, who bulled in for a two-point conversion. Oregon State got the ball back at its 33. The Beavers were able to gain 20 yards in six plays, but the six plays used up all of Oregon State's timeouts. With six seconds left to play in the first half, Baker dropped back to pass from the Mountaineer 47. West Virginia only rushed three, dropping eight to defend. Nevertheless, Baker hit Burke for a 47-yard touchdown pass with no time left in the first half. The pass was Baker's seventh straight completion. Clark kicked the extra point for a 37–6 Oregon State halftime lead.

The first time the Mountaineers got the ball in the second half, they drove 48 yards in eight plays for a touchdown on Glenn Holton's three-yard plunge. Yost hit Ken Herock for the two-point conversion, which cut the Beaver lead to 23. Baker's subsequent punt rolled dead at the West Virginia six. After two plays netted two yards, Yost hit Tom Yeater for a 92-yard touchdown, the longest pass play in Mountaineer history. Yost passed to Tom Woodeshick for two more points, which cut Oregon State's lead to 15. West Virginia got the ball back, but Dan Espalin intercepted a ball at the 32 and returned it inside the Mountaineer 10. Williams scored a touchdown on a four-yard carry with 10 seconds left in the third quarter, and Clark kicked the extra point, which pushed Oregon State's lead to 22. In the fourth quarter, Williams scored his third touchdown on a three-yard carry with 4:55 left in the game. Clark kicked the extra point, which made the final score 51–22.

Oregon State's starting center, John Farrell, was injured in the West Virginia game and did not return to action until the Civil War. Whittle finished with 144 total yards and two touchdowns. Baker finished with 216 total yards and three total touchdowns. Despite the fact that he was consistently double-covered, Burke finished with eight receptions for 131 receiving yards and two touchdowns. The Beavers scored more points than any team had on the Mountaineers since 1951, when Maryland scored 54 en route to a national championship. The game remains Oregon State and West Virginia's last meeting. The Mountaineers' coach, Gene Corum called him "the best T-quarterback" that he had ever seen. The Cuban Missile Crisis ended the following day, Sunday, October 28. However, the United States' quarantine of Cuba did not end until November 20.

=== Washington State ===
	1	2	3	4	Total
Beavers	0	12	6	0	18
Cougars	6	0	0	6	12

Washington State started the season 2–0–1. The Cougars then beat Indiana and Stanford in consecutive weekends to run their record to 4–0–1, Washington State's best start in more than a quarter century. The following weekend in Stockton, California, Pacific upset Washington State 13–12 in a foggy night game. Oregon State line coach Bob "Tiger" Zelinka, who scouted the game, called it "the worst possible thing that could have happened", because he believed that the Cougars would be motivated against the Beavers. Additionally, the Oregon State game was homecoming for Washington State in Pullman. The game represented a passing of torches of sorts. The Cougars' Hugh Campbell led the nation in receptions in 1960 and 1961. Burke led the nation in receptions with 45, Campbell was fifth nationally with 30.

Washington State took the opening kickoff and drove 74 yards for a touchdown. All 74 yards were on the ground. Al Branco's extra point attempt was no good. Late in the first quarter, Baker hit Burke for a 72-yard pass to the Cougar 15, but Oregon State could only muster one yard on four attempts. At the start of the second quarter, the Beavers' Fred Jones recovered a Ken Graham fumble on the Oregon State 46. The drive was jump-started by a 13-yard Baker pass to the Washington State 25. From there, Whittle and Booker Washington alternated in carrying to the one. On fourth down, Baker went over right guard for the touchdown. Steve Clark's extra point attempt was wide. In the closing minutes of the first half, Oregon State drove 71 yards in eight plays for a second touchdown. Three of the plays were Baker passes to Burke for 30 yards. Baker ran around right end for 12 yards and the touchdown, but Baker's two-point conversion pass to Burke failed. The Beavers went into the locker room up 12–6. Campbell did not haul in a single first half reception.

In the third quarter, Oregon State's Dan Espalin made an interception at the Beaver 31 to set up Baker's 52-yard "sensational dash" untouched around right end after a fake handoff to put Oregon State up 18–6. Espalin's second interception ended a Washington State drive. On the Cougars' next drive, back-up quarterback, Dale Ford, led Washington State 57 yards in nine plays to cut the Beavers' lead to 18–12. The drive was kept alive, when Oregon State made multiple substitutions while the clock was running, a five-yard penalty, on fourth down. The penalty gave the Cougars a first down. Washington State's last drive began at their own 45 in the closing minutes. The Cougars drove 36 yards in six plays before Espalin made his third and final interception at the Beavers' three to preserve the Oregon State win. Burke and Campbell each finished with five receptions, but Burke finished with 109 yards, 68 more than Campbell.

=== Idaho ===
	1	2	3	4	Total
Beavers	6	8	12	6	32
Vandals	0	0	0	0	0

Before the game, first-year Idaho head coach Dee Andros drained the pond at Neale Stadium and set out beaver traps. At kickoff, the weather in Moscow was misty, and by the time the fourth quarter began, the mist had given way to fog. Oregon State's Leroy Whittle scored a four-yard touchdown in the first quarter. Steve Clark's extra point attempt was wide left. The Vandals were offside, but Clark also missed his second attempt. Three first half drives by OSU ended in turnovers at the Idaho 11, 32, and 41. Espalin intercepted a Vandal pass at the Idaho 40 and returned it to the 27. After an unnecessary roughness penalty put the ball on the three with 56 seconds left in the first half, Bruce Williams ran twice for the final three yards and a touchdown. Baker then threw a "nifty" pass for two points and a 14–0 Beaver halftime lead. LeRoy Whittle took the second half kickoff and returned it 91 yards for a touchdown. From there, Oregon State tacked on two more touchdowns for a 32–0 shutout. The Beavers racked up 570 total yards, the second-highest total in Oregon State history. Baker had 319 total yards, again setting a single-game Beaver record, and Burke caught six receptions for 74 yards.

=== Colorado State ===
	1	2	3	4	Total
Rams	0	6	0	8	14
Beavers	0	7	12	6	25

Oregon State entered the game on a four-game winning streak; Colorado State entered the game on a 24-game losing streak, the nation's longest major college losing streak. A drizzling rain soaked the field, and many reporters called the field "sloppy."

In the Beavers' first three possessions, they did not cross midfield. Oregon State took its fourth possession at its own 19 and drove 81 yards in seven plays, including 65 on Baker runs and one 11-yard Baker-to-Burke pass. Bruce Williams dove over left guard from one-yard out for the touchdown with 11:16 left in the first half, and Tim Ankersen kicked the extra point. The Beavers drove to the Ram one only to fumble; Colorado State recovered. The Rams quick kicked, and Espalin fumbled the quick kick. Colorado State recovered on their own 41. The Rams then drove 48 yards to the Beaver 11 with less than two minutes left. Colorado State lined up for a field goal, but the Rams' quarterback, John Christensen faked it and threw to Alex Humackich for a touchdown with 53 seconds left in the first half. Christensen was knocked out at the one on the two-point conversion.

In the second half, Baker hit Leroy Whittle for a screen pass, and Whittle ran 42 yards for a touchdown. Ankersen's extra point attempt was wide. Espalin later returned a punt to the Oregon State 48. Baker threw two 12-yard passes to move the Beavers to the Ram 28. Then, Williams knocked over a couple tacklers en route to a 28-yard touchdown scamper to put Oregon State up 19–6 four minutes after the Beavers had gone up 13–6. Colorado State's guard, John Cook, blocked Steve Clark's extra point attempt. In the fourth quarter, Clark lined up for a 47-yard field goal. Cook blocked Clark's attempt and returned the blocked kick 55-yards for a touchdown with less than five minutes left in the game. Christensen passed to Tom Sperl for a two-point conversion to cut the Beavers' lead to five. Oregon State recovered the onside kick attempt and took three plays to respond. Williams ran for a 10-yard gain, and Baker ran twice for 44-yards, including a five-yard touchdown carry around right end. Whittle was tackled at the one on a two-point conversion, which made the final score Oregon State 25–14.

Baker rushed for 163 yards and passed for another 226 yards, enough to move into second for most total career yards in college football history. Baker's 389 yards set the Oregon State total yardage record, which he set the previous Saturday against Idaho. Burke caught 10 passes for 108 yards, giving him 66 receptions for 987 yards on the year. The 66 receptions tied Hugh Campbell's single season record and the 987 receiving yards shattered Campbell's single season record of 881 receiving yards in 1960.

=== Oregon ===
	1	2	3	4	Total
Ducks	0	17	0	0	17
Beavers	0	6	6	8	20

Oregon entered with a 6–2–1 record. The Ducks' two losses were to Ohio State in Columbus and undefeated Texas in Austin. Oregon also tied Washington. The Ducks won each remaining game by two touchdowns, including road games against Air Force and Rice, which had tied Texas. Entering the game, Oregon State was second in total offense in the country and Oregon was fourth. The Ducks were known for their pass defense, holding teams to 69 completions and 2 passing touchdowns compared to 18 interceptions. Vern Burke was primarily used as a decoy to draw coverage. On the Monday before the game, the Ducks loaned the Beavers their tarp. The tarp was Oregon's baseball field tarp, so it did not completely cover the field.

Since 1928, Oregon and Oregon State have alternated home field advantage in the Civil War. The Beavers traditionally host in even-numbered years. From 1956 to 1961, Oregon State was 3–1–2 in Civil Wars but 0–1–2 in Corvallis. The Beavers also lost the 1954; Oregon State did win in 1950 and 1952, but the Beavers elected to play those Civil Wars in Portland. The Beavers also lost the 1948 Civil War. The result is that Oregon State had never won a Civil War in Parker Stadium, opened in 1953, and had not won a Civil War in Corvallis since 1946, despite going 8–3–2 against Oregon from 1949 through 1961. The Ducks were favored by a touchdown, and representatives of the Bluebonnet, Cotton, Gotham, and Sun Bowls were on hand. Oregon was promised a Bluebonnet Bowl bid, if they could beat Oregon State. The game started off very windy; winds hit 95 miles per hour (153 km/h) on the coast, but were closer to 40 mph (64 km/h) in Corvallis. The winds mostly died off after the first quarter, and was accompanied by a "smattering" of rain. Despite the less-than-ideal weather conditions, 28,447 fans turned out, the most-attended football game ever in Corvallis.

In the opening five minutes, Oregon State fumbled and Oregon recovered at the Beaver nine. Three Oregon carries only netted the Ducks seven yards. Oregon went for it, choosing to hand the ball to Mel Renfro on the left side. Oregon State's Rich Koeper, Paul Seal, and Dan Sieg combined to stop Renfro for no gain. The Beavers took over at their own two. Oregon State got possession again late in the first quarter, when Espalin intercepted a Bob Berry pass at the Beaver 25 and returned it to the 30. An Oregon personal foul tacked on an additional 15-yards, so Oregon State began the drive at their 45. The Beavers' first two plays only netted two yards, but Baker hit Dan Sieg for 10 to keep the drive alive on third-and-eight. On third-and-10 at the Duck 31, Baker hit Len Frketich for 10 for a first down just outside the 20. On third-and-one at the 11, Bruce Williams rushed for two yards to set up first-and-goal at the nine. As the quarter came to a close, three rushes netted Oregon State six yards. To start the second quarter, the Beavers found themselves on fourth-and-goal at the Oregon three. Baker hit Burke for a three-yard touchdown. Oregon State lined up for the extra point but faked it. Baker completed his pass to Sieg but he fell outside of the end zone. The touchdown catch gave Burke 67 receptions in 1962, the most ever recorded by a college football receiver in a single season. The touchdown was the Beavers' first passing touchdown in the Civil War since 1954, the year before Prothro began coaching at Oregon State. The touchdown was also only the third passing touchdown that Oregon had allowed all season. The Ducks responded with 17 points in a 10:04 period of the second quarter. Oregon took the kickoff and drove 71 yards on seven plays, 49 on a Berry pass to H.D. Murphy. Berry scampered in from three yards to complete the drive with 11:29 left in the half. Buck Corey kicked the extra point to put the Ducks up 7–6. A little more than seven minutes later, Berry hit Mel Renfro for a 50-yard touchdown pass, to complete a two-play, 56-yard drive. Corey again kicked the extra point to put Oregon up 14–6 with 3:12 left. Jim Sinyard fumbled the ensuing kickoff, which Corey recovered at the Oregon State 27. Three Oregon plays only netted five yards, so Corey came on the field to kick a 38-yard Oregon field goal to put the Ducks up 17–6 at halftime. It was only Corey's second field goal of the year.

Oregon State received the second half kickoff. Renfro interfered with Burke to give the Beavers a first down at the 25. Several plays later, Bruce Williams scampered into the end zone from one yard out. Baker's two-point conversion attempt to Espalin fell incomplete. The Ducks only mustered 36 second half yards. Oregon did not advance beyond their 37-yard line in the third quarter. The Ducks only got across midfield once in the fourth quarter and then only to the Oregon State 48. On Oregon State's second drive of the second half, the Beavers drove down to the four, but Oregon State turned the ball over on downs after Baker's fourth down pass was swatted away by Bill Swain. Later in the second half, Baker ran for 17 yards for a first down at the Oregon 18. Baker then lost 16 yards on three straight plays to set up a 4th and 26 at the Duck 34. Baker was the usual punter, but Rich Brooks was the directional punter, so he came in to punt. Brooks' punt was almost blocked by Dave Wilcox, who had blocked multiple punts in his college career. Renfro at first ran to try and return the ball and then thought better of it. However, the ball took a weird bounce and hit Renfro's leg, as Renfro attempted to back up to avoid the football. The Beavers' Dick Ruhl recovered at the Oregon 13, which set up Oregon State's final touchdown. Wilcox tackled Baker twice for no gain on first and second down. Baker's third-and-10 pass fell incomplete. Down five, Oregon State went for it. Beaver halfback Espalin had noticed that the end and linebacker on his side of the field were dropping back to cover Burke's hook pattern on plays that it was called. He asked Baker to have Burke run a hook route but then to throw it to him on a screen pass. The Beavers had called the play the previous season, but it was not in Oregon State's playbook in 1962. No player other than Baker had called an audible that season, but Baker relented. Baker rolled right and Burke ran a hook route to that side, which the end and linebacker bit on. Renfro, playing safety, also bit on the route, leaving Espalin uncovered. Baker hit Espalin for a touchdown with 11:24 left in the game. Baker then hit Williams for the two-point conversion to put Oregon State up by three. Oregon had one last chance to score, but Seal sacked Berry on four consecutive plays. On fourth down, Berry fumbled and Ross Cariaga recovered at the Duck 17 with less than a minute left.

Baker and Prothro were carried off the field. The Beavers' win was their first Civil War in Corvallis in 16 years. Baker finished with 90 yards passing and 27 yards rushing, 4,980 total yards, 20 yards short of 5,000. His two touchdown passes also equaled the passing touchdowns allowed by Oregon's other nine opponents in 1962. Burke finished with three receptions to set the all-time single season receptions record. His 20 receiving yards gave him 1,007 yards in 1962, padding his own single-season receiving yards record, as well. Ohio State held Oregon to 107 yards rushing. Oregon State held Oregon to 94 yards rushing, and the win ended the Ducks' bowl hopes.

=== After the Civil War ===
Oregon State had not negotiated to play in a bowl game since the 1949 Pineapple Bowl. Before the Civil War, the Beaver players voted to not accept any Sun Bowl invitation. The Sun Bowl representative still appeared to watch Oregon State play in the Civil War. Both Tommy Prothro and Terry Baker believed that they would have gotten an invitation to the Orange Bowl, if Oregon State had defeated Washington. However, #5 Alabama was invited instead with a better record. The Bluebonnet, Cotton, Orange, and Sugar Bowls quickly filled up with Big Eight, SEC, and Southwest conference teams. The Gator Bowl invited #9 Penn State, and the Nittany Lions accepted. Many newspapers championed the Beavers to be Penn State's opponent, but the Gator Bowl announced it would match the Nittany Lions with the winner of the upcoming Battle of the War Canoe between Florida and Miami.

When the Liberty Bowl invited Oregon State, the Beavers believed that it would be the best bowl that would invite them, so they accepted on November 27. On December 1, Miami beat Florida 17–15. The Gator Bowl extended an invitation to Miami, as promised, but Miami turned down the invitation in favor of a Gotham Bowl invitation. The Gator Bowl then invited #12 Duke. The Blue Devils turned down the invitation. Duke was not invited to another bowl for another 27 years. To make matters more interesting, Washington, D.C. attempted to stage a bowl game, named the National Trophy Bowl. Texas Christian was invited, the third-place team from the Southwest Conference. The Horned Frogs accepted, on the condition that they be allowed to choose their opponent.

Had the Beavers waited, they may have had their choice between the Gator Bowl and #9 Penn State, the Gotham Bowl and Miami, and the National Trophy Bowl and Texas Christian. Instead, the Gator Bowl was forced to select Florida, and Nebraska got approval from the Big Eight to accept the Gotham Bowl bid. Learning from Oregon State's previous Gotham Bowl experience, Miami and Nebraska demanded to be paid upfront before going to the Gotham Bowl. The National Trophy Bowl invited 5-5 Navy, which rejected the invitation. No opponent was found for Texas Christian and the National Trophy Bowl was never played.

On November 27, Baker was named a first-team All-American by the American Football Coaches Association (AFCA). Later that day, Baker was named as the Heisman Trophy winner. Still later that same day, Baker was named most outstanding scholar-athlete on the West Coast by the National Football Foundation and Hall of Fame. Baker was the first player west of the Pecos River to win a Heisman Trophy. Baker's 4,980 total career yards was the second-highest total behind Johnny Bright's 5,903. His 2,276 total yards in 1962 were similarly the second-highest total behind Johnny Bright's 2,400. In addition to total yardage, Baker also finished with 1,233 punting yards in 1962.

Baker did not play football as a freshman, whereas Bright played two freshman seasons, the first with Michigan State and the second with Drake. Bright also only played against two current FBS teams: Iowa State and Oklahoma State. Drake went 1-4-1 against those two opponents and 18-2-1 against all other opponents. Baker only played against one regular-season team that currently does not have a FBS team, Pacific, and Pacific had a Division I-A team until it dropped football in 1995.

Baker flew east on November 30. As a result of being named the most outstanding scholar-athlete on the West Coast by the National Football Foundation, Baker was invited to attend the Army–Navy game with President John F. Kennedy on December 1 in Philadelphia. It was the last Army–Navy game that John F. Kennedy attended. After the Army–Navy game, Baker traveled to New York City. Because Baker was chosen an AFCA All-American, on December 2, Baker appeared on the Ed Sullivan Show. On December 3 and 5, Baker had to be in New York City to attend a Heisman Trophy dinner and the actual presentation. On December 4, he accepted his National Football Foundation award for being the most outstanding scholar-athlete on the West Coast.

On December 5, Baker received the Heisman Trophy from Attorney General Robert F. Kennedy. Terry Baker finished with 707 points, the fewest points for a Heisman winner since 1952. Baker finished first in the East and West regions but finished third in the Southwest, fourth in the Midwest, and was left off altogether in the South region, in a concerted effort by the region to award the Heisman Trophy to eventual runner-up, Jerry Stovall.

On December 6, Baker appeared on The Tonight Show Starring Johnny Carson. Baker then returned to Oregon for a practice on December 7. Baker took his finals between December 10 and 12. On December 10, UPI named Baker the back of the year and Baker was informed that he would be awarded the Maxwell Award in February 1963. On December 10, Burke won the WJ Voit Award as the top player on the Pacific Coast. The team returned to Philadelphia on December 13. Two days later, Oregon State played Villanova in the Liberty Bowl, the second bowl game of the 1962–1963 bowl season. The opening kickoff at the Gotham Bowl, the first bowl game of the 1962–1963 bowl season, was two hours before the opening kickoff at the Liberty Bowl.

=== Villanova ===
	1	2	3	4	Total
Beavers	6	0	0	0	6
Wildcats	0	0	0	0	0

Oregon State was the clear favorite, but the Wildcats were no pushover. Villanova had a 7–2 record and the eighth best defense in college football in 1962. The Wildcats' only losses were to Boston College by 15 points and Massachusetts by a single point. Villanova had defeated one-time power, Detroit by 14, and had defeated both Buffalo and Rutgers on the road by more than three touchdowns. The Wildcats out-sized Oregon State at most positions and by at least 15 pounds on the line. Additionally, while two of Oregon State's players were drafted, four Villanova players were drafted, including Larry Glueck. Villanova also had more bowl experience. The Wildcats were the defending Sun Bowl champions. In an era of only 11 bowl games, winning a bowl game was quite an achievement. Villanova was the host team. The game was played 30 minutes to the southeast of Villanova in Philadelphia Municipal Stadium. The temperature was 17 degrees at kickoff, keeping all but 17,048 from showing up in the 105,000-seat stadium. However, 27 million watched on television. If the game were held in 2007, it would have been the fourth most-watched bowl game.

Villanova got the first break of the game in the first quarter when William Sherlock's 52-yard punt was downed nine inches from the Oregon State end zone by Larry Glueck. Previously, downing a punt inside the 10 resulted in a touchback. However, a rule change prior to the start of the 1962 season allowed teams to pin opponents inside the 10 on punts. Head coach, Tommy Prothro, allowed Terry Baker to call the play. Baker had injured his shoulder in the Civil War and had been instructed by Prothro to avoid running with the football. The Wildcats stacked the box with eight men, expecting something up the middle; however, Terry Baker took it around the left end. He shook off Villanova's Al Atkinson in the end zone and broke away. At the ten, he stiff-armed Glueck. From there, Baker turned on the afterburners and outran the Wildcats down the field for a touchdown. Baker's two-point pass was broken up, keeping the score 6–0, with more than nine minutes left in the first quarter. Baker's 99-yard run was the longest in Beaver history. The previous longest run in Beaver history was 83 yards, held by Baker. Baker's 99-yard run remains the longest play from scrimmage in bowl and Oregon State history. As of 2010, the run is three yards longer than any other run in bowl history. In the second quarter, the Wildcats responded by driving 52 yards to the Beaver 12. Villanova's Billy Joe ran into the end zone from 12 yards out, but the play was called back for holding. Two plays later, the Oregon State defense forced an end-zone interception to end the threat.

Villanova spent most of the game marching between the twenties. At some point in each Villanova drive, Oregon State's defense stiffened and stopped the Wildcats. Villanova's last threat began when they broke into the Beavers’ red zone with less than four minutes left. The Wildcats drove 61 yards down to the Beaver nine before Oregon State's Paul Seal recovered a Ted Aceto fumble at the Beaver eight with 2:47 left to extinguish the Wildcats’ chances.

Villanova outgained Oregon State 309–299 with 20 first downs to the Beavers’ 11. The Beavers' defense forced six Wildcat turnovers. Baker rushed for 137 yards and passed for 123 yards. The 260 yards accounted for 87% of Oregon State's offense. The win remains the easternmost Beaver victory since Oregon State's 1933 win over Fordham.

=== After the season ===
The Cornhuskers won the Gotham Bowl 36–34, winning their first bowl game ever and cementing their first winning season since 1954. Nebraska built off the high-profile win and did not post another losing season until 2004. The Gotham Bowl was never played again. Penn State was incensed that the Gator Bowl had invited 6-4 Florida. The segregated Gators turned the slight into a North–South battle and added Confederate flags to their helmets. Florida won 17–7. Baker and Oregon State returned to Oregon on December 16. On December 19, Baker travelled to Lexington, Kentucky to re-join the basketball team in the University of Kentucky Invitational Tournament. He led the Beavers in scoring in a five-point loss to West Virginia, which dropped Oregon State's record to 2–4. The Beavers rebounded to finish third at the tournament and Baker was named to the all-tournament team. On January 7, 1963, Baker was named Sportsman of the Year. He is the only Heisman Trophy winner to ever win the honor. Other winners in the 1960s include Arnold Palmer, Sandy Koufax, Carl Yastrzemski, and Bill Russell. Sonny Liston was under strong consideration for the award in 1963. On January 22, Baker accepted the Glenn (Pop) Warner Memorial Award as the most valuable senior college player on the Pacific Coast. The award was presented in Palo Alto, California by Ernie Nevers, who was eventually elected into the NCAA and NFL Halls of Fame. Willie Mays also appeared at the award ceremony in Palo Alto to accept a San Francisco Baseball Writers Association award. In February, Prothro accepted the Maxwell Award on behalf of Baker. Baker was the first player to ever win both the Heisman and Maxwell awards, to be selected by both the AP and UPI as player of the year, and to win unanimous All-America ranking and to receive a scholar-athlete grant from the National Football Foundation. After starting 2–4, the Beavers' basketball team went 20–3, before finally losing to two-time defending-champion Cincinnati in the Final Four. Baker became the first player to ever win a Heisman and play in the Final Four. The Liberty Bowl was held in Philadelphia 1963, but, in 1964, organizers moved the game indoors to Atlantic City, New Jersey. In 1965, the Liberty Bowl was moved to Memphis, Tennessee, where it has been played ever since.

The Los Angeles Rams had the first overall pick in the NFL Draft, and they selected Baker. In Baker's first NFL game, he threw three interceptions. As a result, the Rams' head coach Harland Svare decided to attempt to convert Baker into a halfback. After four years, the Rams released Baker. The New York Giants showed interest, but Baker wanted to complete his law degree and instead signed with the Edmonton Eskimos. Edmonton finished 6-10-1 in 1966. In 1967, Baker led the Eskimos to a 10-5-1 record and berth in the Western Conference playoffs. Edmonton ultimately lost to Saskatchewan in sudden death overtime, Baker's last football game as a player.

Rich Brooks graduated from Oregon State in 1963. His last football game as a player was the 1962 Liberty Bowl. Brooks played defensive back, fullback, tailback, quarterback, and punter for the Beavers. While he was a player, Oregon State went 3-0-1 in the Civil War. Brooks served as an assistant coach for the Beavers in 7 out of the next 11 seasons, serving as the defensive line coach for the Beavers, during their 1967 Giant Killers year. Oregon State went 6–1 in the Civil War, while he was an assistant coach for the Beavers, 9-1-1 as a coach and player. In 1977, Brooks became the head coach at Oregon. Brooks led the Ducks to consecutive winning seasons in 1979 and 1980 for the first time in 16 years. In 1989 and 1990, Brooks led Oregon to consecutive the bowl games, the first time that the Ducks had been invited to consecutive bowl games. In 1994, Brooks led the Ducks to the Pac-10 championship, the Ducks' first conference championship since their Pacific Coast Conference championship in 1919. Brooks started out 10-0-1 in Civil Wars against Oregon State and finished 14-3-1. In 29 Civil Wars, Brooks finished with an overall record of 23-4-2 a winning percentage of .828.

== Personnel ==
=== Coaching staff ===
- Bob Zelinka, line
- Bob Watson
- Ron Siegrist
- Jerry Long
- Bob Gambold
- Bobb McKittrick

=== Roster ===
1962 Oregon State Beavers football team roster
Players
Coaches
Offense

Pos.	#	Name	Class
QB	11	Terry Baker	Sr
QB	14	Rich Brooks	Sr
E	80	Vern Burke	Jr
G	60	Ross Cariaga	Sr
G	62	Warren Cole	So
C	50	Dick DeBisschop	Sr
HB	27	Dan Espalin	So
TE	85	Len Frketich	So
G	63	Al Funston	So
OT	72	Jim Funston	Sr
G	61	George Gnoss (C)	Sr
E	84	Fred Jones	Sr
C	52	Hoyt Keeny	So
OT	79	Rich Koeper	So
HB	35	Olvin Moreland	So
OT	67	Jerry Neil	Jr
QB	18	Gordon Queen	So
FB	44	Dick Ruhl	Sr
HB	37	Dan Sieg	So
FB	47	Booker Washington	So
HB	22	Leroy Whittle	Jr

Defense

Pos.	#	Name	Class

Special teams

Pos.	#	Name	Class
PK	41	Tim Ankersen	Sr
P	11	Terry Baker	Sr
PK	12	Steve Clark	So

Head coach

- Tommy Prothro (8th year)

Coordinators/assistant coaches

- Bob Zelinka (line)
- Bob Gambold
- Bobb McKittrick
- Ron Siegrist
- Jerry Long
- Bob Watson

Legend

- (C) Team captain
- (S) Suspended
- (I) Ineligible
- Injured
- Redshirt

== Awards and honors ==
- Terry Baker, Heisman Trophy
- Terry Baker, Maxwell Award
- Terry Baker, Consensus All-America selection
- Terry Baker, Liberty Bowl Most Valuable Player
- Terry Baker, Sports Illustrated Sportsman of the Year

== NFL draft ==
Two Beavers were selected in the 1963 NFL draft, which lasted 20 rounds and 280 selections.

Player	Position	Round	Pick	NFL club
Terry Baker	Quarterback	1	1	Los Angeles Rams
Vern Burke	End	5	64	San Francisco 49ers
