= 1962 NCAA University Division football season =

American college football season

- Preseason AP No. 1: Ohio State
- Regular season: September 22 – December 1, 1962
- Number of bowls: 10
- Bowl games: December 15, 1962 – January 1, 1963
- Champions: USC (AP, Coaches, FWAA, NFF); Ole Miss (Litkenhous)
- Heisman: Oregon State quarterback Terry Baker

The 1962 NCAA University Division football season was played by American football teams representing 140 colleges and universities recognized by the National Collegiate Athletic Association (NCAA) as major programs. The remaining 370 colleges and universities that were NCAA members and fielded football teams competed as part of the 1962 NCAA College Division football season.

Four teams, including three from the Southeastern Conference (SEC), have a claim to the 1962 major college national championship:

- USC (11–0) was ranked No. 1 in the final AP and UPI polls, defeated No. 2 Wisconsin in the 1963 Rose Bowl, and was rated as the national champion by more than 10 other official selectors, including The Football News and the Football Writers Association of America (FWAA). Head coach John McKay won the Coach of the Year Award from both the American Football Coaches Association (AFCA) and the FWAA.
- Ole Miss (10–0) won the SEC championship and were ranked No. 3 in the final AP and UPI polls before defeating No. 6 Arkansas in the 1963 Sugar Bowl. The Rebels were awarded the Litkenhous Ratings trophy for the national championship. Decades later, they were also rated as national champions by Billingsley in the 2004 NCAA records book (after the selector revised its math system) and Sagarin about 1978. To date, it is the only undefeated and untied season in Ole Miss football history.
- Alabama (10–1) was ranked No. 5 in the final AP and UPI polls and defeated No. 8 Oklahoma in the 1963 Orange Bowl. The Crimson Tide was selected as national champion by the Billingsley Report in the 1995 NCAA records book.
- LSU (9–1) defeated No. 4 Texas in the Cotton Bowl and was selected retroactively as national champion by Berryman QPRS. LSU halfback Jerry Stovall played on offense, defense, and special teams, won the Walter Camp Memorial Trophy as the nation's best back, was named SEC Player of the Year, and was the runner-up for the Heisman Trophy.

Oregon State quarterback Terry Baker won both the Heisman Trophy and the Maxwell Award as the best player in college football. Minnesota defensive lineman Bobby Bell finished third in the Heisman voting and won the Outland Trophy. Baylor quarterback Don Trull won the Sammy Baugh Trophy.

Statistical leaders in the 1962 University Division included Terry Baker with 1,738 passing yards; New Mexico State halfback Preacher Pilot with 1,247 rushing yards; Preacher Pilot and Cotton Clark of Alabama, each with 90 points scored; and Oregon State end Vern Burke with 1,007 receiving yards.

== Rule changes ==
- Reduced the penalty for illegal shift from 15 to five yards.
- Allows punts downed inside the 10 yard line to be spotted where the punt is downed. Previously these punts were returned to the 20 yard line (touchback).
- Increased to 15 yards the penalty for the defense kicking a forward pass or a placekick held by an opponent.

== Conference and program changes ==
=== Conference changes ===
- Four conferences began play in 1962:
  - College Athletic Conference – an active NCAA Division III conference that ended sponsorship of football after the 2017 season; known as the Southern Collegiate Athletic Conference after the 1991 season
  - Gateway Conference – active through the 1974 season
  - Western Athletic Conference – began play with former members of the Border Conference (Arizona and Arizona State) and the Skyline Conference (BYU, New Mexico, Utah, and Wyoming). The remaining members of the Border (Hardin–Simmons, New Mexico State, Texas Western, and West Texas State) and the Skyline (Colorado State, Montana, and Utah State) became independents. The only exception was Denver, who dropped its football program entirely.
- One conference upgraded to the NCAA University Division in 1962:
  - Mid-American Conference – moved up from the College Division to the University Division beginning in 1962. The conference had been considered among the best in the college division. The previous year two MAC schools, Western Michigan and Bowling Green, were invited to bowl games. The conference produced college division national champions Ohio in 1960 and Bowling Green in 1959. In addition, Miami of Ohio finished second in the final 1958 College Division poll and was ranked in the final major AP and UPI polls in 1955.

=== Membership changes ===
School	1961 Conference	1962 Conference
Arizona Wildcats	Border	WAC
Arizona State Sun Devils	Border	WAC
Austin Peay Governors	VSAC	Ohio Valley
BYU Cougars	Skyline Eight	WAC
Colorado State Rams	Skyline Eight	Independent
Denver Pioneers	Skyline Eight	dropped program
Hardin–Simmons Cowboys	Border	Independent
Montana Grizzlies	Skyline Eight	Independent
New Mexico Lobos	Skyline Eight	WAC
New Mexico State Aggies	Border	Independent
Texas Western Miners	Border	Independent
Utah Utes	Skyline Eight	WAC
Utah State Aggies	Skyline Eight	Independent
Washington State Cougars	Independent	AAWU
West Texas State Buffaloes	Border	Independent
Wyoming Cowboys	Skyline Eight	WAC

== September ==
In the preseason poll released on September 17, Ohio State was the No. 1 choice for 45 of the 50 voters, and its Big Ten rival, Michigan State was 4th overall. Texas placed second, and SEC rivals Alabama and Louisiana State (LSU) were third and fifth respectively. As the regular season progressed, a new poll would be issued on the Monday following the weekend's games. Ohio State, Michigan State and the other Big Ten schools would not kick off until September 29. On September 22, No. 2 Texas beat Oregon at home, 25–13. No. 3 Alabama and No. 5 LSU both recorded shutouts, defeating Georgia (at Birmingham 35–0) and Texas A&M (21–0) respectively. In the poll that followed, Alabama rose to No. 1, while Ohio State and Texas fell to 2nd and 3rd. Penn State, which had beaten Navy at home 41–7, rose from 9th to 4th, while LSU remained at No. 5. Also on the 22nd, the first games of the newly formed Western Athletic Conference took place as Arizona beat BYU, 27–21, and New Mexico beat Wyoming 25–21. All six of the charter members (including Arizona State and Utah) had withdrawn by 1999.

The following Friday, No. 1 Alabama beat Tulane in New Orleans, 44–6. On September 29, No. 2 Ohio State beat North Carolina at home, 41–7. No. 3 Texas registered a shutout on the road against Texas Tech, 34–0 while No. 4 Penn State hosted Air Force, winning 20–6. In Baton Rouge, No. 5 LSU played Rice to a 6–6 tie, enough to knock it from the Top Ten. In the poll that followed, Ohio State was again No. 1, followed by No. 2 Alabama, No. 3 Texas, and No. 4 Penn State. No. 8 Georgia Tech, which had blanked Florida in Gainesville, 17–0, rose to 5th.

== October ==
On October 6, No. 1 Ohio State was upset by the UCLA Bruins at Los Angeles, 9–7. No. 2 Alabama beat Vanderbilt at Birmingham, 17–7. No. 3 Texas hosted Tulane (fresh from a 44–6 loss to Alabama) and won 35–8. No. 4 Penn State beat Rice at Houston, 18–7. No. 5 Georgia Tech lost to LSU at Atlanta, 10–7, and dropped back out of the poll. No. 6 USC won 7–0 at Iowa, while No. 7 Mississippi defeated Houston 40–7. The next poll was No. 1 Alabama, No. 2 Texas, No. 3 Penn State, No. 4 USC, and No. 5 Mississippi.

October 13 No. 1 Alabama beat Houston 14–3 at home. No. 2 Texas survived its Dallas encounter with Oklahoma, 9–6. No. 3 Penn State lost to Army at West Point by the same 9–6 margin. No. 4 USC and No. 5 Mississippi were both idle. No. 6 LSU improved its record to 3–0–1 with a 17–3 win against the visiting Miami Hurricanes. Though Alabama got more first place votes than Texas in the poll (24 vs. 21) the Longhorns had more points overall, and were the new No. 1. The results were No. 1 Texas, No. 2 Alabama, No. 3 USC, No. 4 LSU, and No. 5 Mississippi.

On October 20, all five of the top teams remained unbeaten. No. 1 Texas beat No. 7 Arkansas 7–3 at home. No. 2 Alabama defeated Tennessee at Knoxville, 27–7. The No. 3 USC Trojans hosted California and won 32–3. No. 4 LSU beat Kentucky at Lexington 7–0 and No. 5 Mississippi shut out Tulane at New Orleans, 21–0. Nevertheless, LSU and Mississippi dropped to 6th and 7th in the next poll, while Big Ten rivals No. 8 Northwestern and No. 10 Wisconsin reached the Top 5. Northwestern had beaten No. 6 Ohio State 18–14 at Columbus, while Wisconsin thrashed Iowa 42–14. The rankings were No. 1 Texas, No. 2 Alabama, No. 3 Northwestern, No. 4 USC, and No. 5 Wisconsin.

In the first weekend after the resolution of the Cuban Missile Crisis, week 7's games were played on October 27. 45 days after President Kennedy asked "Why does Rice play Texas?" in a speech at Rice Stadium, the 0–3–1 Owls tied the No. 1 Longhorns on the same field, 14–14. No. 2 Alabama beat Tulsa 35–6 and No. 3 Northwestern defeated Notre Dame 35–6 at home. No. 4 USC won 28–16 over Illinois at Champaign, and No. 5 Wisconsin lost to Ohio State at Columbus, 14–7. The No. 6 LSU Tigers shut out Florida 23–0 at home. The Northwestern Wildcats were voted into first place, followed by No. 2 Alabama, No. 3 USC, No. 4 LSU, and No. 5 Texas.

== November ==
November 3 No. 1 Northwestern narrowly defeated Indiana, 26–21, at Bloomington. No. 2 Alabama and No. 3 USC shut out Mississippi State (20–0) and No. 9 Washington (14–0), respectively. No. 4 LSU lost 15–7 at home to No. 7 Mississippi, which had been 0–2–1 against LSU and 27–0 against all other opponents in the last three regular seasons. No. 5 Texas got past SMU at home, 6–0. The next poll was No. 1 Northwestern, No. 2 USC, No. 3 Alabama, No. 4 Mississippi, and No. 5 Texas.

November 10 No. 1 Northwestern was beaten at Madison by No. 8 Wisconsin, 37–6. No. 3 Alabama beat the Miami Hurricanes 36–3 and No. 2 USC won at Stanford, 39–14. No. 4 Mississippi defeated Chattanooga 52–7, and No. 5 Texas won at Baylor, 27–12. With the return of Wisconsin to the Top 5 and Northwestern dropping out, the poll was No. 1 Alabama, No. 2 USC, No. 3 Mississippi, No. 4 Wisconsin, and No. 5 Texas.

November 17 No. 1 Alabama travelled to Atlanta and lost to Georgia Tech, 7–6. No. 2 USC defeated Navy, 13–6, at home. No. 3 Mississippi beat Tennessee at Knoxville, 19–6. No. 4 Wisconsin won at Illinois, 35–6, and No. 5 Texas beat Texas Christian, 14–0. No. 8 Minnesota defeated Purdue 7–6. The last two unbeaten and untied teams, USC and Mississippi, were first and second in the next poll, followed by No. 3 Wisconsin, No. 4 Texas, and No. 5 Minnesota.

On Thanksgiving Day (the 22nd), No. 4 Texas hosted Texas A&M and won 13–3 to clinch the Southwest Conference title and the Cotton Bowl bid, half a game ahead of Arkansas. On November 24 No. 1 USC beat UCLA, 14–3, extending its record to 9–0–0 and finishing a game ahead of Washington for the AAWU title and the Rose Bowl bid. No. 2 Mississippi was idle. USC's bowl opponent was determined in the season-ending game between No. 3 Wisconsin and No. 5 Minnesota, both 5–1–0 in Big Ten conference play. They met at Madison and the Badgers won on their home field, 14–9, to take the Big Ten title and the trip to the Rose Bowl. In the penultimate poll, USC retained the No. 1 spot, and Wisconsin was 2nd with an 8–1–0 record. Despite being unbeaten and untied, Mississippi placed third in the voting, followed by No. 4 Texas and No. 5 Alabama. The stage was set for a meeting of No. 1 and No. 2 at the Rose Bowl on New Year's Day, the first time in the 26-year history of the AP Poll that the top two teams would face off against each other in a bowl game.

December 1, No. 1 USC closed a perfect season by beating Notre Dame 25–0 in Los Angeles for a 10–0–0 finish. No. 3 Mississippi beat Mississippi State 13–6 at home to close with a 9–0–0 record, the SEC championship, and a trip to the Sugar Bowl against No. 6 Arkansas, while No. 5 Alabama beat Auburn 38–0 in the season-ender at Birmingham to close their season at 10–1–0 and second place. The Tide accepted a bid to face the Big 8 champions, No. 8 Oklahoma, in the Orange Bowl. No. 7 LSU, the SEC's third-place finisher, filled the final major bowl slot by accepting a bid to the Cotton Bowl against Texas. The final AP poll, which determined the unofficial national championship, was released on December 3. USC finished first, followed by No. 2 Wisconsin, No. 3 Mississippi, No. 4 Texas, and No. 5 Alabama. The NCAA Football Guide recognized the University of Southern California as the 1962 champion as number one in both the AP poll and the UPI poll.

== Conference standings ==
1962 Athletic Association of Western Universities football standings
	Conf.					Overall
Team	W		L		T	W		L		T
No. 1 USC $	4	–	0	–	0	11	–	0	–	0
Washington	4	–	1	–	0	7	–	1	–	2
Washington State	1	–	1	–	0	5	–	4	–	1
Stanford	2	–	3	–	0	5	–	5	–	0
UCLA	1	–	3	–	0	4	–	6	–	0
California	0	–	4	–	0	1	–	9	–	0
$ – Conference champion; Rankings from AP Poll

1962 Atlantic Coast Conference football standings
	Conf.					Overall
Team	W		L		T	W		L		T
Duke $	6	–	0	–	0	8	–	2	–	0
Clemson	5	–	1	–	0	6	–	4	–	0
Maryland	5	–	2	–	0	6	–	4	–	0
South Carolina	3	–	4	–	0	4	–	5	–	1
NC State	3	–	4	–	0	3	–	6	–	1
North Carolina	3	–	4	–	0	3	–	7	–	0
Virginia	1	–	4	–	0	5	–	5	–	0
Wake Forest	0	–	7	–	0	0	–	10	–	0
$ – Conference champion

1962 Big Eight Conference football standings
	Conf.					Overall
Team	W		L		T	W		L		T
No. 8 Oklahoma $	7	–	0	–	0	8	–	3	–	0
Missouri	5	–	1	–	1	8	–	1	–	2
Nebraska	5	–	2	–	0	9	–	2	–	0
Kansas	4	–	2	–	1	6	–	3	–	1
Iowa State	3	–	4	–	0	5	–	5	–	0
Oklahoma State	2	–	5	–	0	4	–	6	–	0
Colorado	1	–	6	–	0	2	–	8	–	0
Kansas State	0	–	7	–	0	0	–	10	–	0
$ – Conference champion; Rankings from AP Poll

1962 Big Ten Conference football standings
	Conf.					Overall
Team	W		L		T	W		L		T
No. 2 Wisconsin $	6	–	1	–	0	8	–	2	–	0
No. 10 Minnesota	5	–	2	–	0	6	–	2	–	1
Northwestern	4	–	2	–	0	7	–	2	–	0
Ohio State	4	–	2	–	0	6	–	3	–	0
Michigan State	3	–	3	–	0	5	–	4	–	0
Purdue	3	–	3	–	0	4	–	4	–	1
Iowa	3	–	3	–	0	4	–	5	–	0
Illinois	2	–	5	–	0	2	–	7	–	0
Indiana	1	–	5	–	0	3	–	6	–	0
Michigan	1	–	6	–	0	2	–	7	–	0
$ – Conference champion; Rankings from AP Poll

1962 Ivy League football standings
	Conf.					Overall
Team	W		L		T	W		L		T
Dartmouth $	7	–	0	–	0	9	–	0	–	0
Harvard	5	–	2	–	0	6	–	3	–	0
Columbia	4	–	3	–	0	5	–	4	–	0
Princeton	4	–	3	–	0	5	–	4	–	0
Cornell	4	–	3	–	0	4	–	5	–	0
Penn	2	–	5	–	0	3	–	6	–	0
Yale	1	–	5	–	1	2	–	5	–	2
Brown	0	–	6	–	1	1	–	6	–	2
$ – Conference champion

1962 Mid-American Conference football standings
	Conf.					Overall
Team	W		L		T	W		L		T
Bowling Green $	5	–	0	–	1	7	–	1	–	1
Ohio	5	–	1	–	0	8	–	3	–	0
Miami (OH)	3	–	1	–	1	8	–	2	–	1
Western Michigan	3	–	3	–	0	5	–	4	–	0
Kent State	2	–	4	–	0	3	–	6	–	0
Toledo	1	–	5	–	0	3	–	6	–	0
Marshall	0	–	5	–	0	4	–	6	–	0
$ – Conference champion

1962 Middle Three Conference football standings
	Conf.					Overall
Team	W		L		T	W		L		T
Rutgers $	2	–	0	–	0	5	–	5	–	0
Lehigh	1	–	1	–	0	3	–	6	–	0
Lafayette	0	–	2	–	0	3	–	6	–	0
$ – Conference champion

1962 Missouri Valley Conference football standings
	Conf.					Overall
Team	W		L		T	W		L		T
Tulsa $	3	–	0	–	0	5	–	5	–	0
North Texas State	2	–	1	–	0	6	–	4	–	0
Cincinnati	1	–	2	–	0	2	–	8	–	0
Wichita	0	–	3	–	0	3	–	7	–	0
$ – Conference champion

1962 Southeastern Conference football standings
	Conf.					Overall
Team	W		L		T	W		L		T
No. 3 Ole Miss $	6	–	0	–	0	10	–	0	–	0
No. 5 Alabama	6	–	1	–	0	10	–	1	–	0
No. 7 LSU	5	–	1	–	0	9	–	1	–	1
Georgia Tech	5	–	2	–	0	7	–	3	–	1
Florida	4	–	2	–	0	7	–	4	–	0
Auburn	4	–	3	–	0	6	–	3	–	1
Georgia	2	–	3	–	1	3	–	4	–	3
Kentucky	2	–	3	–	1	3	–	5	–	2
Mississippi State	2	–	5	–	0	3	–	6	–	0
Tennessee	2	–	6	–	0	4	–	6	–	0
Vanderbilt	1	–	6	–	0	1	–	9	–	0
Tulane	0	–	7	–	0	0	–	10	–	0
$ – Conference champion; Rankings from AP Poll

1962 Southern Conference football standings
	Conf.					Overall
Team	W		L		T	W		L		T
VMI $	6	–	0	–	0	6	–	4	–	0
West Virginia	4	–	0	–	0	8	–	2	–	0
Richmond	3	–	2	–	0	6	–	3	–	0
William & Mary	4	–	3	–	1	4	–	5	–	1
Furman	2	–	2	–	0	4	–	6	–	0
Virginia Tech	2	–	3	–	0	5	–	5	–	0
The Citadel	1	–	4	–	0	3	–	7	–	0
George Washington	1	–	5	–	0	3	–	7	–	0
Davidson	0	–	4	–	1	3	–	5	–	1
$ – Conference champion

1962 Southwest Conference football standings
	Conf.					Overall
Team	W		L		T	W		L		T
No. 4 Texas $	6	–	0	–	1	9	–	1	–	1
No. 6 Arkansas	6	–	1	–	0	9	–	2	–	0
TCU	5	–	2	–	0	6	–	4	–	0
Texas A&M	3	–	4	–	0	3	–	7	–	0
Baylor	3	–	4	–	0	4	–	6	–	0
Rice	2	–	4	–	1	2	–	6	–	2
SMU	2	–	5	–	0	2	–	8	–	0
Texas Tech	0	–	7	–	0	1	–	9	–	0
$ – Conference champion; Rankings from AP Poll

1962 Western Athletic Conference football standings
	Conf.					Overall
Team	W		L		T	W		L		T
New Mexico $	2	–	1	–	1	7	–	2	–	1
Arizona State	1	–	1	–	0	7	–	2	–	1
Arizona	2	–	2	–	0	5	–	5	–	0
Wyoming	2	–	2	–	0	5	–	5	–	0
BYU	2	–	2	–	0	4	–	6	–	0
Utah	1	–	2	–	1	4	–	5	–	1
$ – Conference champion

1962 NCAA University Division independents football records
	Conf.			Overall
Team	W	L	T	W		L		T
Memphis State		–		8	–	1	–	0
Oregon State		–		9	–	2	–	0
No. 9 Penn State		–		9	–	2	–	0
West Texas State		–		9	–	2	–	0
Boston College		–		8	–	2	–	0
Utah State		–		8	–	2	–	0
Villanova		–		7	–	3	–	0
Buffalo		–		6	–	3	–	0
Oregon		–		6	–	3	–	1
Houston		–		7	–	4	–	0
Miami (FL)		–		7	–	4	–	0
Army		–		6	–	4	–	0
Holy Cross		–		6	–	4	–	0
Louisville		–		6	–	4	–	0
Xavier		–		6	–	4	–	0
Florida State		–		4	–	3	–	3
Air Force		–		5	–	5	–	0
Montana		–		5	–	5	–	0
Navy		–		5	–	5	–	0
Notre Dame		–		5	–	5	–	0
Pacific (CA)		–		5	–	5	–	0
Pittsburgh		–		5	–	5	–	0
Syracuse		–		5	–	5	–	0
Texas Western		–		4	–	5	–	0
New Mexico State		–		4	–	6	–	0
Colgate		–		3	–	5	–	1
Idaho		–		2	–	6	–	1
San Jose State		–		2	–	8	–	1
Boston University		–		2	–	7	–	0
Dayton		–		2	–	8	–	0
Detroit		–		1	–	8	–	0
Hardin–Simmons		–		1	–	9	–	0
Colorado State		–		0	–	10	–	0
Rankings from AP Poll

== Bowl games ==
The 1962–1963 Bowl Season is notable for the 1963 Rose Bowl. This game is the first No. 1 versus No. 2 bowl game pairing in the history of the AP Poll and the UPI Poll, both singly and jointly. However, neither poll published rankings after the bowl games at this time, so USC was already the season-ending No. 1 and would remain so, regardless of the outcome of the game.

=== Major bowls ===
Tuesday, January 1, 1963

Bowl	Winner	Score	Runner-up	Score	Reference
ROSE	No. 1 USC Trojans	42	No. 2 Wisconsin Badgers	37	
SUGAR	No. 3 Mississippi Rebels	17	No. 6 Arkansas Razorbacks	13	
COTTON	No. 7 LSU Tigers	13	No. 4 Texas Longhorns	0	
ORANGE	No. 5 Alabama Crimson Tide	17	No. 8 Oklahoma Sooners	0	

=== Other bowls ===
Games played in December 1962, rankings from Coaches Poll

Bowl	Date	Winner	Score	Runner-up	Reference
SUN	December 31	West Texas State Buffaloes	15–14	Ohio Bobcats	
GATOR	December 29	Florida Gators	17–7	No. 9 Penn State Nittany Lions	
TANGERINE	December 22	Houston Cougars	49–21	Miami (OH) Redskins	
BLUEBONNET	December 22	No. 12 Missouri Tigers	14–10	No. 11 Georgia Tech Yellow Jackets	
LIBERTY	December 15	No. 16 Oregon State Beavers	6–0	Villanova Wildcats	
GOTHAM	December 15	Nebraska Cornhuskers	36–34	No. 18 Miami (FL) Hurricanes	

== Heisman Trophy voting ==
The Heisman Trophy is given to the year's most outstanding player

Player	School	Position	1st	2nd	3rd	Total
Terry Baker	Oregon State	QB	172	74	43	707
Jerry Stovall	LSU	HB	112	100	82	618
Bobby Bell	Minnesota	OT	56	95	71	429
Lee Roy Jordan	Alabama	C/LB	70	35	41	321
George Mira	Miami (FL)	QB	41	53	55	284
Pat Richter	Wisconsin	E	55	40	31	276
George Saimes	Michigan State	FB	48	36	38	254
Billy Lothridge	Georgia Tech	QB	24	35	20	162
Ron Vander Kelen	Wisconsin	QB	23	22	26	139
Eldon Fortie	BYU	HB	25	22	17	136

== Statistical leaders ==
=== Rushing ===
The following players were the individual leaders in rushing during the 1963 season:

Rank	Player	Team	Games	Yds	Rushes	Avg	TD
1	Preacher Pilot	New Mexico State	10	1247	208	6.0	15
2	Eldon Fortie	BYU	10	1149	199	5.8	14
3	Gale Sayers	Kansas	10	1125	158	7.1	7
4	Gary Wood	Cornell	9	889	173	5.1	9
5	Joe Don Looney	Oklahoma	10	852	137	6.2	9
6	Pete Pedro	West Texas State	10	831	134	6.2	8
7	Johnny Roland	Missouri	10	830	159	5.2	12
8	Dave Casinelli	Memphis State	9	826	173	4.8	11
9	Bobby Santiago	New Mexico	10	806	151	5.3	9
10	Dave Hoppmann	Iowa State	10	798	198	4.0	11

== See also ==
- 1962 NCAA University Division football rankings
- 1962 College Football All-America Team
