= Eldon Fortie =

Gridiron football player (1941–2021)

No. 15, 21
- Positions: Halfback, Quarterback

Personal information
- Born: May 21, 1941; Salt Lake City, Utah, U.S.
- Died: January 6, 2021 (aged 79); Mesa, Arizona, U.S.
- Listed height: 6 ft 0 in (1.83 m)
- Listed weight: 170 lb (77 kg)

Career information
- High school: Granite (South Salt Lake, Utah)
- College: BYU

Career history
- 1963: Edmonton Eskimos

Awards and highlights
- First-team All-American (1962); WAC Offensive Player of the Year (1962); BYU Cougars No. 40 retired

Career statistics
- Rushing yards: 36
- Rushing average: 3.3
- Passing completions–attempts: 8–16
- TD–INT: 1–1
- Passing yards: 173
- Receptions/receiving yards: 3/40

Eldon Fortie (May 21, 1941 – January 6, 2021) was an American professional football player for the Edmonton Eskimos of the Canadian Football League (CFL). He played college football for the BYU Cougars. Dubbed "the Phantom" while at BYU, he was the first BYU football player to be named to a first-team All-American team.

== Early years and college career ==
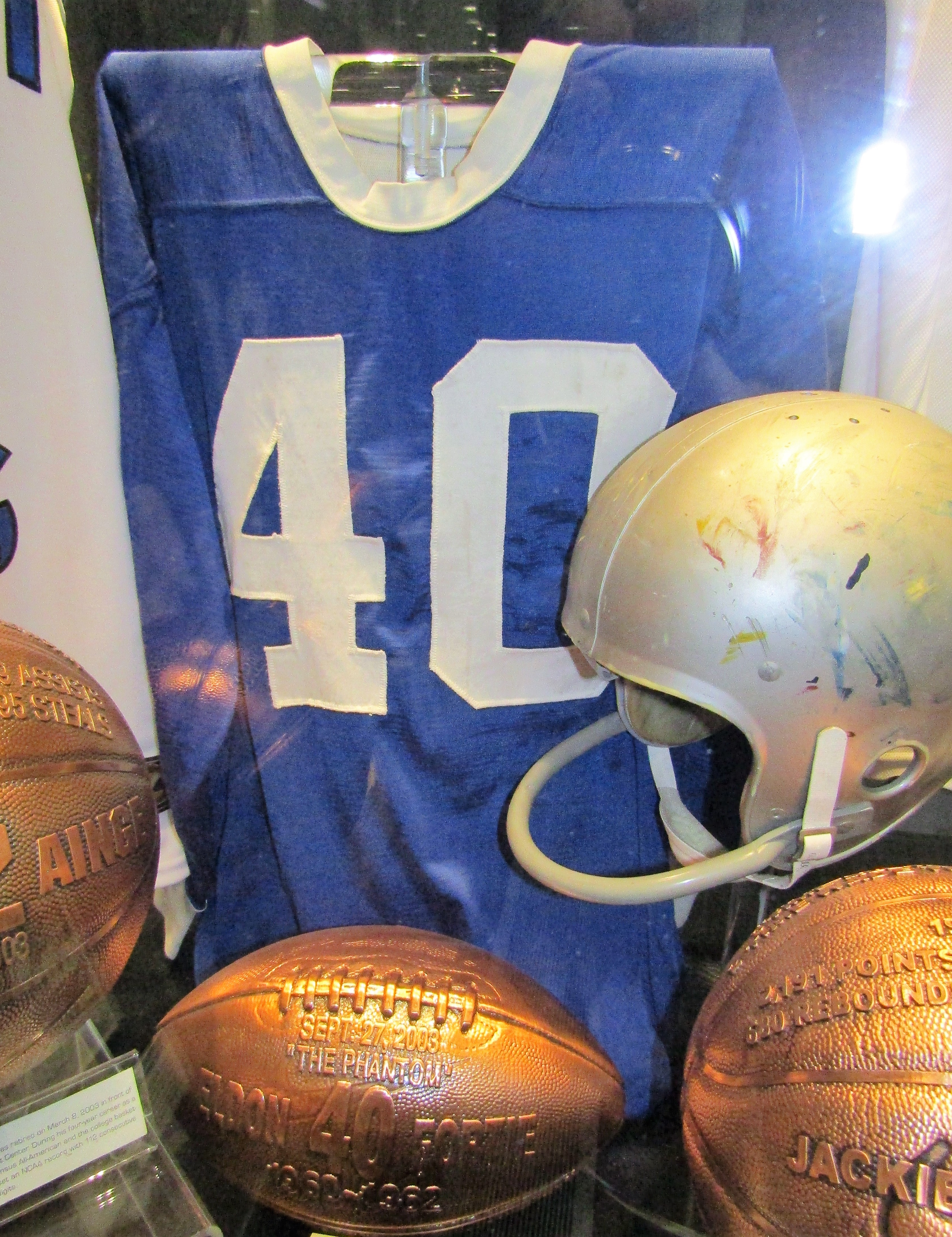
Eldon Fortie's football jersey and helmet

Fortie was born in Salt Lake City, Utah. During his senior season at Brigham Young University, Fortie led the nation in total offense for eight weeks, and at the end of the season finished second behind Terry Baker with 1,963 total yards and 14 touchdowns. On September 29, 1962, Fortie ran for 272 yards in a single game in Provo against the George Washington University Colonials. That was the single best running game of any BYU player in school history, until 2016, when Jamaal Williams rushed for 286 yards against Toledo. Fortie's No. 40 was retired after that season, the first BYU student to have that honor. In 1962, he ran for 1,149 yards and 14 TDs but more impressively also threw for 814 yards with 7 TDs. He finished 10th in the Heisman voting.

Although Fortie was a quarterback, BYU ran the single wing offense at the time; consequently, Fortie played primarily a halfback. He was selected to play in several all-star games after the 1962 season, including the North–South Bowl, the Hula Bowl, the All-American Game, and the Coaches All-American Bowl.

== Professional career ==
After graduation, Fortie played one year in the Canadian Football League (CFL) with the Edmonton Eskimos.

== Death ==
He died in Mesa, Arizona, on January 6, 2021, at the age of 79.
