= 1962 Dayton Flyers football team =

American college football season

1962 Dayton Flyers football
- Conference: Independent
- Record: 2–8
- Head coach: Stan Zajdel (3rd season)
- Home stadium: Baujan Field

1962 NCAA University Division independents football records
	Conf.			Overall
Team	W	L	T	W		L		T
Memphis State		–		8	–	1	–	0
Oregon State		–		9	–	2	–	0
No. 9 Penn State		–		9	–	2	–	0
West Texas State		–		9	–	2	–	0
Boston College		–		8	–	2	–	0
Utah State		–		8	–	2	–	0
Villanova		–		7	–	3	–	0
Buffalo		–		6	–	3	–	0
Oregon		–		6	–	3	–	1
Houston		–		7	–	4	–	0
Miami (FL)		–		7	–	4	–	0
Army		–		6	–	4	–	0
Holy Cross		–		6	–	4	–	0
Louisville		–		6	–	4	–	0
Xavier		–		6	–	4	–	0
Florida State		–		4	–	3	–	3
Air Force		–		5	–	5	–	0
Montana		–		5	–	5	–	0
Navy		–		5	–	5	–	0
Notre Dame		–		5	–	5	–	0
Pacific (CA)		–		5	–	5	–	0
Pittsburgh		–		5	–	5	–	0
Syracuse		–		5	–	5	–	0
Texas Western		–		4	–	5	–	0
New Mexico State		–		4	–	6	–	0
Colgate		–		3	–	5	–	1
Idaho		–		2	–	6	–	1
San Jose State		–		2	–	8	–	1
Boston University		–		2	–	7	–	0
Dayton		–		2	–	8	–	0
Detroit		–		1	–	8	–	0
Hardin–Simmons		–		1	–	9	–	0
Colorado State		–		0	–	10	–	0
Rankings from AP Poll

The 1962 Dayton Flyers football team represented the University of Dayton as an independent during the 1962 NCAA University Division football season. In their third season under head coach Stan Zajdel, the Flyers compiled a 2–8 record. Dayton played their home games at Baujan Field in Dayton, Ohio.

== Schedule ==
Date	Opponent	Site	Result	Attendance	Source
September 15	Kent State	Baujan Field; Dayton, OH	L 7–22	14,500	
September 22	at Cincinnati	Nippert Stadium; Cincinnati, OH	L 0–13	15,000	
September 29	Bowling Green	Baujan Field; Dayton, OH	L 7–14	14,350	
October 6	at Ohio	Peden Stadium; Athens, OH	L 25–27	9,000	
October 13	Louisville	Baujan Field; Dayton, OH	L 0–21	11,000	
October 20	at Xavier	Xavier Stadium; Cincinnati, OH	L 6–23	11,206	
October 26	at Detroit	University of Detroit Stadium; Detroit, MI	W 13–12	12,608	
November 3	Holy Cross	Baujan Field; Dayton, OH	L 14–36	7,750	
November 10	at Miami (OH)	Miami Field; Oxford, OH	L 20–42	11,735	
November 17	Wichita	Baujan Field; Dayton, OH	W 8–0	5,000	
