= 1962 Toledo Rockets football team =

American college football season

1962 Toledo Rockets football
- Conference: Mid-American Conference
- Record: 3–6 (1–5 MAC)
- Head coach: Clive Rush (3rd season)
- Home stadium: Glass Bowl

1962 Mid-American Conference football standings
	Conf.					Overall
Team	W		L		T	W		L		T
Bowling Green $	5	–	0	–	1	7	–	1	–	1
Ohio	5	–	1	–	0	8	–	3	–	0
Miami (OH)	3	–	1	–	1	8	–	2	–	1
Western Michigan	3	–	3	–	0	5	–	4	–	0
Kent State	2	–	4	–	0	3	–	6	–	0
Toledo	1	–	5	–	0	3	–	6	–	0
Marshall	0	–	5	–	0	4	–	6	–	0
$ – Conference champion

The 1962 Toledo Rockets football team was an American football team that represented Toledo University in the Mid-American Conference (MAC) during the 1962 NCAA University Division football season. In their third and final season under head coach Clive Rush, the Rockets compiled a 3–6 record (1–5 against MAC opponents), finished in sixth place in the MAC, and were outscored by all opponents by a combined total of 176 to 133.

The team's statistical leaders included Butch Yenrick with 552 passing yards, Frank Baker with 613 rushing yards, and Jim Thibert with 198 receiving yards.

== Schedule ==
Date	Opponent	Site	Result	Attendance	Source
September 15	South Dakota State*	Glass Bowl; Toledo, OH	L 14–25	10,300	
September 22	at Ohio	Peden Stadium; Athens, OH	L 0–31	10,000	
October 6	at Marshall	Fairfield Stadium; Huntington, WV	W 42–12	4,000	
October 13	Bowling Green	Glass Bowl; Toledo, OH (rivalry)	L 13–28	13,236	
October 20	at Western Michigan	Waldo Stadium; Kalamazoo, MI	L 0–21	8,500	
October 27	at Kent State	Memorial Stadium; Kent, OH	L 18–20	7,000	
November 3	Miami (OH)	Glass Bowl; Toledo, OH	L 12–21	6,562	
November 10	Temple*	Glass Bowl; Toledo, OH	W 13–0	4,279	
November 17	at Tulsa*	Skelly Stadium; Tulsa, OK	W 21–18	5,000	
*Non-conference game; Source:

== After the season ==
=== NFL draft ===
The following Rockets were selected in the 1963 NFL draft following the season.

Round	Pick	Player	Position	NFL club
5	68	Frank Baker	Back	Cleveland Browns
15	197	Larry Campbell	End	Los Angeles Rams
15	198	Ed Scrutchins	End	St. Louis Cardinals
16	217	Jim Bogdalek	Tackle	San Francisco 49ers
