= 1962 Marshall Thundering Herd football team =

American college football season

1962 Marshall Thundering Herd football
- Conference: Mid-American Conference
- Record: 4–6 (0–5 MAC)
- Head coach: Charlie Snyder (4th season)
- Captains: Robert Maxwell; Roger Jefferson
- Home stadium: Fairfield Stadium

1962 Mid-American Conference football standings
	Conf.					Overall
Team	W		L		T	W		L		T
Bowling Green $	5	–	0	–	1	7	–	1	–	1
Ohio	5	–	1	–	0	8	–	3	–	0
Miami (OH)	3	–	1	–	1	8	–	2	–	1
Western Michigan	3	–	3	–	0	5	–	4	–	0
Kent State	2	–	4	–	0	3	–	6	–	0
Toledo	1	–	5	–	0	3	–	6	–	0
Marshall	0	–	5	–	0	4	–	6	–	0
$ – Conference champion

The 1962 Marshall Thundering Herd football team was an American football team that represented Marshall University in the Mid-American Conference (MAC) during the 1962 NCAA University Division football season. In its fourth season under head coach Charlie Snyder, the team compiled a 4–6 record (0–5 against conference opponents), finished in seventh place out of seven teams in the MAC, and was outscored by a total of 237 to 137. Robert Maxwell and Roger Jefferson were the team captains. The team played its home games at Fairfield Stadium in Huntington, West Virginia.

== Schedule ==
Date	Opponent	Site	Result	Attendance	Source
September 15	Findlay*	Fairfield Stadium; Huntington, WV	W 40–22		
September 22	at Bowling Green	University Stadium; Bowling Green, OH	L 6–48	10,500	
September 29	Louisville*	Fairfield Stadium; Huntington, WV	L 0–18	6,700	
October 6	Toledo	Fairfield Stadium; Huntington, WV	L 12–42	4,000	
October 13	at Kent State	Memorial Stadium; Kent, OH	L 14–23	8,000	
October 20	vs. Morehead State*	Putnam Stadium; Ashland, KY	W 26–18		
October 27	at Western Michigan	Fairfield Stadium; Huntington, WV	L 0–12	5,000	
November 3	at Ohio	Peden Stadium; Athens, OH (rivalry)	L 0–35	12,500	
November 10	Xavier*	Fairfield Stadium; Huntington, WV	W 13–6		
November 17	Butler*	Fairfield Stadium; Huntington, WV	W 26–13		
*Non-conference game; Source:
