= 1962 Ohio Bobcats football team =

American college football season

1962 Ohio Bobcats football

Sun Bowl, L 14–15 vs. West Texas State
- Conference: Mid-American Conference
- Record: 8–3 (5–1 MAC)
- Head coach: Bill Hess (5th season)
- Home stadium: Peden Stadium

1962 Mid-American Conference football standings
	Conf.					Overall
Team	W		L		T	W		L		T
Bowling Green $	5	–	0	–	1	7	–	1	–	1
Ohio	5	–	1	–	0	8	–	3	–	0
Miami (OH)	3	–	1	–	1	8	–	2	–	1
Western Michigan	3	–	3	–	0	5	–	4	–	0
Kent State	2	–	4	–	0	3	–	6	–	0
Toledo	1	–	5	–	0	3	–	6	–	0
Marshall	0	–	5	–	0	4	–	6	–	0
$ – Conference champion

The 1962 Ohio Bobcats football team was an American football team that represented Ohio University in the Mid-American Conference (MAC) during the 1962 NCAA University Division football season. In their fifth season under head coach Bill Hess, the Bobcats compiled an 8–3 record (5–1 against MAC opponents), finished in second place in the MAC, lost to West Texas State in the 1962 Sun Bowl (14–15), and outscored all opponents by a combined total of 261 to 112. They played their home games in Peden Stadium in Athens, Ohio.

The team's statistical leaders included Jim Albert with 375 rushing yards, Bob Babbitt with 1,010 passing yards, and Ron Curtis with 286 receiving yards.

== Schedule ==
Date	Opponent	Site	Result	Attendance	Source
September 22	Toledo	Peden Stadium; Athens, OH	W 31–0	10,000	
September 29	at Kent State	Memorial Stadium; Kent, OH	W 21–0	9,500	
October 6	Dayton*	Peden Stadium; Athens, OH	W 27–25	9,000	
October 13	at Xavier*	Xavier Stadium; Cincinnati, OH	W 20–6	12,085	
October 20	Miami (OH)^{†}	Peden Stadium; Athens, OH (rivalry)	W 12–6	16,000	
October 27	at Buffalo*	Rotary Field; Buffalo, NY	W 41–6	10,915	
November 3	Marshall	Peden Stadium; Athens, OH (rivalry)	W 35–0	12,500	
November 10	at Bowling Green	University Stadium; Bowling Green, OH	L 6–7	12,315	
November 17	at Western Michigan	Waldo Stadium; Kalamazoo, MI	W 32–16	7,000	
November 24	at Iowa State*	Clyde Williams Field; Ames, IA	L 22–31	10,000	
December 31	vs. West Texas State*	Kidd Field; El Paso, TX (Sun Bowl)	L 14–15	13,000–16,000	
*Non-conference game; ^{†}Homecoming; Source:
