= 1962 Kent State Golden Flashes football team =

American college football season

1962 Kent State Golden Flashes football
- Conference: Mid-American Conference
- Record: 3–6 (2–4 MAC)
- Head coach: Trevor J. Rees (17th season)
- Home stadium: Memorial Stadium

1962 Mid-American Conference football standings
	Conf.					Overall
Team	W		L		T	W		L		T
Bowling Green $	5	–	0	–	1	7	–	1	–	1
Ohio	5	–	1	–	0	8	–	3	–	0
Miami (OH)	3	–	1	–	1	8	–	2	–	1
Western Michigan	3	–	3	–	0	5	–	4	–	0
Kent State	2	–	4	–	0	3	–	6	–	0
Toledo	1	–	5	–	0	3	–	6	–	0
Marshall	0	–	5	–	0	4	–	6	–	0
$ – Conference champion

The 1962 Kent State Golden Flashes football team was an American football team that represented Kent State University in the Mid-American Conference (MAC) during the 1962 NCAA University Division football season. In their 17th season under head coach Trevor J. Rees, the Golden Flashes compiled a 3–6 record (2–4 against MAC opponents), finished in fifth place in the MAC, and were outscored by all opponents by a combined total of 185 to 107.

The team's statistical leaders included Dick Merschman with 555 rushing yards, Jim Flynn with 605 passing yards, and Dick Wolf with 119 receiving yards. Running back Dick Merschman was selected as a first-team All-MAC player.

== Schedule ==
Date	Opponent	Site	Result	Attendance	Source
September 15	at Dayton*	Baujan Field; Dayton, OH	W 22–7	14,500	
September 22	Xavier*	Memorial Stadium; Kent, OH	L 8–9	10,000	
September 29	Ohio	Memorial Stadium; Kent, OH	L 0–21	9,500	
October 6	at Miami (OH)	Miami Field; Oxford, OH	L 14–23	10,958	
October 13	Marshall	Memorial Stadium; Kent, OH	W 23–14	8,000	
October 20	at Bowling Green	University Stadium; Bowling Green, OH (rivalry)	L 6–45	12,262	
October 27	Toledo	Memorial Stadium; Kent, OH	W 20–18	7,000	
November 3	Western Michigan	Memorial Stadium; Kent, OH	L 6–19	5,000	
November 10	at Louisville*	Fairgrounds Stadium; Louisville, KY	L 8–29	5,000	
*Non-conference game; Source:
