= 1962 Xavier Musketeers football team =

American college football season

1962 Xavier Musketeers football
- Conference: Independent
- Record: 6–4
- Head coach: Ed Biles (1st season)
- Home stadium: Xavier Stadium

1962 NCAA University Division independents football records
	Conf.			Overall
Team	W	L	T	W		L		T
Memphis State		–		8	–	1	–	0
Oregon State		–		9	–	2	–	0
No. 9 Penn State		–		9	–	2	–	0
West Texas State		–		9	–	2	–	0
Boston College		–		8	–	2	–	0
Utah State		–		8	–	2	–	0
Villanova		–		7	–	3	–	0
Buffalo		–		6	–	3	–	0
Oregon		–		6	–	3	–	1
Houston		–		7	–	4	–	0
Miami (FL)		–		7	–	4	–	0
Army		–		6	–	4	–	0
Holy Cross		–		6	–	4	–	0
Louisville		–		6	–	4	–	0
Xavier		–		6	–	4	–	0
Florida State		–		4	–	3	–	3
Air Force		–		5	–	5	–	0
Montana		–		5	–	5	–	0
Navy		–		5	–	5	–	0
Notre Dame		–		5	–	5	–	0
Pacific (CA)		–		5	–	5	–	0
Pittsburgh		–		5	–	5	–	0
Syracuse		–		5	–	5	–	0
Texas Western		–		4	–	5	–	0
New Mexico State		–		4	–	6	–	0
Colgate		–		3	–	5	–	1
Idaho		–		2	–	6	–	1
San Jose State		–		2	–	8	–	1
Boston University		–		2	–	7	–	0
Dayton		–		2	–	8	–	0
Detroit		–		1	–	8	–	0
Hardin–Simmons		–		1	–	9	–	0
Colorado State		–		0	–	10	–	0
Rankings from AP Poll

The 1962 Xavier Musketeers football team was an American football team that represented Xavier University as an independent during the 1962 NCAA University Division football season. In their first year under head coach Ed Biles, the Musketeers compiled a 6–4 record.

== Schedule ==
Date	Opponent	Site	Result	Attendance	Source
September 15	Miami (OH)	Xavier Stadium; Cincinnati, OH	L 14–23	13,651	
September 22	at Kent State	Memorial Stadium; Kent, OH	W 9–8	10,000	
September 29	Detroit	Xavier Stadium; Cincinnati, OH	W 24–20	12,652	
October 13	Ohio	Xavier Stadium; Cincinnati, OH	L 6–20	12,085	
October 20	Dayton	Xavier Stadium; Cincinnati, OH	W 23–6	11,206	
October 27	at Villanova	Villanova Stadium; Villanova, PA	L 8–16	12,000	
November 3	at Louisville	Fairgrounds Stadium; Louisville, KY	W 13–12	7,916	
November 10	at Marshall	Fairfield Stadium; Huntington, WV	L 6–13		
November 17	at Kentucky	McLean Stadium; Lexington, KY	W 14–9	20,000	
November 24	at Cincinnati	Nippert Stadium; Cincinnati, OH (rivalry)	W 7–6	16,000	
