= 1962 Western Michigan Broncos football team =

American college football season

1962 Western Michigan Broncos football
- Conference: Mid-American Conference
- Record: 5–4 (3–3 MAC)
- Head coach: Merle Schlosser (6th season)
- MVP: Bill Schlee
- Captains: Mike Maul; Roger Theder
- Home stadium: Waldo Stadium

1962 Mid-American Conference football standings
	Conf.					Overall
Team	W		L		T	W		L		T
Bowling Green $	5	–	0	–	1	7	–	1	–	1
Ohio	5	–	1	–	0	8	–	3	–	0
Miami (OH)	3	–	1	–	1	8	–	2	–	1
Western Michigan	3	–	3	–	0	5	–	4	–	0
Kent State	2	–	4	–	0	3	–	6	–	0
Toledo	1	–	5	–	0	3	–	6	–	0
Marshall	0	–	5	–	0	4	–	6	–	0
$ – Conference champion

The 1962 Western Michigan Broncos football team represented Western Michigan University in the Mid-American Conference (MAC) during the 1962 NCAA University Division football season. In their sixth season under head coach Merle Schlosser, the Broncos compiled a 5–4 record (3–3 against MAC opponents), finished in fourth place in the MAC, and outscored their opponents, 158 to 112. The team played its home games at Waldo Stadium in Kalamazoo, Michigan.

The team's statistical leaders included Roger Theder with 824 passing yards, Bill Schlee with 599 rushing yards, and Jim Bednar with 255 receiving yards. Center Mike Maul and quarterback Roger Theder were the team captains. Fullback Bill Schlee received the team's most outstanding player award.

== Schedule ==
Date	Opponent	Site	Result	Attendance	Source
September 15	Central Michigan*	Waldo Stadium; Kalamazoo, MI (rivalry)	W 28–0	11,000	
September 22	at Louisville*	Fairgrounds Stadium; Louisville, KY	L 21–27	7,982	
September 29	at Miami (OH)	Miami Field; Oxford, OH	L 7–17	7,280	
October 6	Bowling Green	Waldo Stadium; Kalamazoo, MI	L 6–10	15,000	
October 20	Toledo	Waldo Stadium; Kalamazoo, MI	W 21–0	8,500	
October 27	at Marshall	Fairfield Stadium; Huntington, WV	W 12–0	5,000	
November 3	at Kent State	Memorial Stadium; Kent, OH	W 19–6	5,000	
November 10	BYU*	Waldo Stadium; Kalamazoo, MI	W 28–20	13,000	
November 17	Ohio	Waldo Stadium; Kalamazoo, MI	L 16–32	7,000	
*Non-conference game; Source:

== See also ==
- 1962 in Michigan
