= 1962 Florida State Seminoles football team =

American college football season

1962 Florida State Seminoles football
- Conference: Independent
- Record: 4–3–3
- Head coach: Bill Peterson (3rd season)
- Offensive scheme: Pro set
- Defensive coordinator: Don James (1st season)
- Base defense: 4–3
- Captain: Gene McDowell
- Home stadium: Doak Campbell Stadium

1962 NCAA University Division independents football records
	Conf.			Overall
Team	W	L	T	W		L		T
Memphis State		–		8	–	1	–	0
Oregon State		–		9	–	2	–	0
No. 9 Penn State		–		9	–	2	–	0
West Texas State		–		9	–	2	–	0
Boston College		–		8	–	2	–	0
Utah State		–		8	–	2	–	0
Villanova		–		7	–	3	–	0
Buffalo		–		6	–	3	–	0
Oregon		–		6	–	3	–	1
Houston		–		7	–	4	–	0
Miami (FL)		–		7	–	4	–	0
Army		–		6	–	4	–	0
Holy Cross		–		6	–	4	–	0
Louisville		–		6	–	4	–	0
Xavier		–		6	–	4	–	0
Florida State		–		4	–	3	–	3
Air Force		–		5	–	5	–	0
Montana		–		5	–	5	–	0
Navy		–		5	–	5	–	0
Notre Dame		–		5	–	5	–	0
Pacific (CA)		–		5	–	5	–	0
Pittsburgh		–		5	–	5	–	0
Syracuse		–		5	–	5	–	0
Texas Western		–		4	–	5	–	0
New Mexico State		–		4	–	6	–	0
Colgate		–		3	–	5	–	1
Idaho		–		2	–	6	–	1
San Jose State		–		2	–	8	–	1
Boston University		–		2	–	7	–	0
Dayton		–		2	–	8	–	0
Detroit		–		1	–	8	–	0
Hardin–Simmons		–		1	–	9	–	0
Colorado State		–		0	–	10	–	0
Rankings from AP Poll

The 1962 Florida State Seminoles football team represented Florida State University as an independent during the 1962 NCAA University Division football season. This was Bill Peterson's third year as head coach, and he led the team to a 4–3–3 record.

== Schedule ==
Date	Opponent	Site	Result	Attendance	Source
September 15	The Citadel	Doak Campbell Stadium; Tallahassee, FL	W 49–0	15,000	
September 22	at Kentucky	McLean Stadium; Lexington, KY	T 0–0	34,000	
September 29	Furman	Doak Campbell Stadium; Tallahassee, FL	W 42–0	17,500	
October 5	at No. 9 Miami (FL)	Miami Orange Bowl; Miami, FL (rivalry)	L 6–7	43,962	
October 20	at Georgia	Sanford Stadium; Athens, GA	W 18–0	31,500	
October 27	Virginia Tech	Doak Campbell Stadium; Tallahassee, FL	W 20–7	16,000	
November 3	Houston^{†}	Doak Campbell Stadium; Tallahassee, FL	L 0–7	20,000	
November 10	at Georgia Tech	Grant Field; Atlanta, GA	T 14–14	43,802	
November 17	at Florida	Florida Field; Gainesville, FL (rivalry)	L 7–20	47,000	
November 24	at Auburn	Cliff Hare Stadium; Auburn, AL	T 14–14	20,000	
^{†}Homecoming; Rankings from AP Poll released prior to the game; Source:

== Roster ==
- WR Fred Biletnikoff, So.
