= 1962 Penn State Nittany Lions football team =

American college football season

1962 Penn State Nittany Lions football

Eastern champion

Gator Bowl, L 7–17 vs. Florida
- Conference: Independent

Ranking
- Coaches: No. 9
- AP: No. 9
- Record: 9–2
- Head coach: Rip Engle (13th season)
- Captain: Joe Galardi
- Home stadium: Beaver Stadium

1962 NCAA University Division independents football records
	Conf.			Overall
Team	W	L	T	W		L		T
Memphis State		–		8	–	1	–	0
Oregon State		–		9	–	2	–	0
No. 9 Penn State		–		9	–	2	–	0
West Texas State		–		9	–	2	–	0
Boston College		–		8	–	2	–	0
Utah State		–		8	–	2	–	0
Villanova		–		7	–	3	–	0
Buffalo		–		6	–	3	–	0
Oregon		–		6	–	3	–	1
Houston		–		7	–	4	–	0
Miami (FL)		–		7	–	4	–	0
Army		–		6	–	4	–	0
Holy Cross		–		6	–	4	–	0
Louisville		–		6	–	4	–	0
Xavier		–		6	–	4	–	0
Florida State		–		4	–	3	–	3
Air Force		–		5	–	5	–	0
Montana		–		5	–	5	–	0
Navy		–		5	–	5	–	0
Notre Dame		–		5	–	5	–	0
Pacific (CA)		–		5	–	5	–	0
Pittsburgh		–		5	–	5	–	0
Syracuse		–		5	–	5	–	0
Texas Western		–		4	–	5	–	0
New Mexico State		–		4	–	6	–	0
Colgate		–		3	–	5	–	1
Idaho		–		2	–	6	–	1
San Jose State		–		2	–	8	–	1
Boston University		–		2	–	7	–	0
Dayton		–		2	–	8	–	0
Detroit		–		1	–	8	–	0
Hardin–Simmons		–		1	–	9	–	0
Colorado State		–		0	–	10	–	0
Rankings from AP Poll

The 1962 Penn State Nittany Lions football team represented the Pennsylvania State University as an independent during the 1962 NCAA University Division football season. The team was coached by Rip Engle and played its home games in Beaver Stadium in University Park, Pennsylvania.

== Schedule ==
Date	Opponent	Rank	Site	TV	Result	Attendance	Source
September 22	Navy	No. 9	Beaver Stadium; University Park, PA		W 41–7	41,220	
September 29	Air Force	No. 4	Beaver Stadium; University Park, PA		W 20–6	45,200	
October 6	at Rice	No. 4	Rice Stadium; Houston, TX		W 18–7	35,982–38,000	
October 13	at Army	No. 3	Michie Stadium; West Point, NY		L 6–9	31,000	
October 20	Syracuse^{†}		Beaver Stadium; University Park, PA (rivalry)		W 20–19	46,920	
October 27	at California		California Memorial Stadium; Berkeley, CA		W 23–21	31,500	
November 3	Maryland		Beaver Stadium; University Park, PA (rivalry)		W 23–7	41,384	
November 10	West Virginia		Beaver Stadium; University Park, PA (rivalry)		W 34–6	33,212	
November 17	at Holy Cross		Fitton Field; Worcester, MA		W 48–20	11,825	
November 24	at Pittsburgh	No. 9	Pitt Stadium; Pittsburgh, PA (rivalry)		W 16–0	45,149	
December 29	vs. Florida	No. 9	Gator Bowl Stadium; Jacksonville, FL (Gator Bowl)	CBS	L 7–17	50,286	
^{†}Homecoming; Rankings from AP Poll released prior to the game; Source:
