= 1962 Sun Bowl =

American college football game

Ohio Bobcats	West Texas State Buffaloes
(8–2)	(8–2)
MAC	Independent
14	15
Head coach: Bill Hess	Head coach: Joe Kerbel
	1	2	3	4	Total
Ohio	0	3	8	3	14
West Texas State	0	7	0	8	15
- Date: December 31, 1962
- Season: 1962
- Stadium: Kidd Field
- Location: El Paso, Texas
- MVP: Jerry Logan, HB
- Referee: Curly Hays (WAC; split crew: WAC, MAC)
- Attendance: 13,000–16,000

The 1962 Sun Bowl was a college football postseason bowl game between the Ohio Bobcats and the West Texas State Buffaloes.

== Background ==
West Texas State (now known as West Texas A&M) was selected as an independent and was third in scoring with 29.7 points per game and fifth in rushing with 255.5 yards per game. Ohio was selected to represent as a member of the Mid-America Athletic Conference in their first ever bowl game. This was the final Sun Bowl played at Kidd Field.

== Game summary ==
Jim McKee kicked a 52-yard field goal to put the Bobcats ahead early but they trailed at the half 7-3 after a touchdown pass from Jim Dawson to Jerry Don Logan. In the third quarter, Skip Hoovler intercepted a pass and ran it back 91 yards for a touchdown, which still stands as the longest interception return in the Sun Bowl. Bob Babbitt completed a pass to Ken Smith for the two-point conversion to give Ohio an 11-7 lead. Ohio added in a field goal in the 4th to make it 14-7 late in the game. West Texas scored on a Dave “Hoot” Gibson pass to Jerry Richardson, who went 32 yards for the score. The game came down to a two-point conversion attempt by the Buffaloes. Dawson's pass to Jim Ostrander was successful, and the Buffaloes won. Logan recorded six tackles and caught a touchdown pass and was named MVP. Pete Pedro rushed for 105 yards on 14 carries for the Buffaloes.

== Aftermath ==
Ohio would win the MAC title the following year, but wasn't invited to a bowl game. The Buffaloes made just one more bowl game, the Junior Rose Bowl in 1967.
