= 1962 Detroit Titans football team =

American college football season

1962 Detroit Titans football
- Conference: Independent
- Record: 1–8
- Head coach: John Idzik (1st season)
- Home stadium: University of Detroit Stadium

1962 NCAA University Division independents football records
	Conf.			Overall
Team	W	L	T	W		L		T
Memphis State		–		8	–	1	–	0
Oregon State		–		9	–	2	–	0
No. 9 Penn State		–		9	–	2	–	0
West Texas State		–		9	–	2	–	0
Boston College		–		8	–	2	–	0
Utah State		–		8	–	2	–	0
Villanova		–		7	–	3	–	0
Buffalo		–		6	–	3	–	0
Oregon		–		6	–	3	–	1
Houston		–		7	–	4	–	0
Miami (FL)		–		7	–	4	–	0
Army		–		6	–	4	–	0
Holy Cross		–		6	–	4	–	0
Louisville		–		6	–	4	–	0
Xavier		–		6	–	4	–	0
Florida State		–		4	–	3	–	3
Air Force		–		5	–	5	–	0
Montana		–		5	–	5	–	0
Navy		–		5	–	5	–	0
Notre Dame		–		5	–	5	–	0
Pacific (CA)		–		5	–	5	–	0
Pittsburgh		–		5	–	5	–	0
Syracuse		–		5	–	5	–	0
Texas Western		–		4	–	5	–	0
New Mexico State		–		4	–	6	–	0
Colgate		–		3	–	5	–	1
Idaho		–		2	–	6	–	1
San Jose State		–		2	–	8	–	1
Boston University		–		2	–	7	–	0
Dayton		–		2	–	8	–	0
Detroit		–		1	–	8	–	0
Hardin–Simmons		–		1	–	9	–	0
Colorado State		–		0	–	10	–	0
Rankings from AP Poll

The 1962 Detroit Titans football team represented the University of Detroit as an independent during the 1962 NCAA University Division football season. In their first year under head coach John Idzik, the Titans compiled a 1–8 record and were outscored by a combined total of 199 to 90.

The team's statistical leaders included Jerry Gross with 1,317 passing yards and 24 points scored, Vic Battani with 359 rushing yards, and Tom Bolz with 455 receiving yards.

== Schedule ==
Date	Opponent	Site	Result	Attendance	Source
September 22	Boston College	University of Detroit Stadium; Detroit, MI	L 0–27	22,000	
September 29	at Xavier	Xavier Stadium; Cincinnati, OH	L 20–24	12,652	
October 5	New Mexico State	University of Detroit Stadium; Detroit, MI	L 14–21	12,507	
October 12	Kentucky	University of Detroit Stadium; Detroit, MI	L 8–27		
October 26	Dayton	University of Detroit Stadium; Detroit, MI	L 12–13	12,608	
November 3	at Villanova	Villanova Stadium; Villanova, PA	L 0–14	3,000 / 9,500 (paid)	
November 9	Cincinnati	University of Detroit Stadium; Detroit, MI	W 15–14	8,393	
November 17	South Carolina	University of Detroit Stadium; Detroit, MI	L 13–26		
November 24	at Memphis State	Crump Stadium; Memphis, TN	L 8–33	9,022	

== See also ==
- 1962 in Michigan
