= 1962 Oregon Ducks football team =

American college football season

1962 Oregon Ducks football
- Conference: Independent
- Record: 6–3–1
- Head coach: Len Casanova (12th season)
- Captains: Ron Snidow; Steve Barnett
- Home stadium: Hayward Field; Multnomah Stadium

1962 NCAA University Division independents football records
	Conf.			Overall
Team	W	L	T	W		L		T
Memphis State		–		8	–	1	–	0
Oregon State		–		9	–	2	–	0
No. 9 Penn State		–		9	–	2	–	0
West Texas State		–		9	–	2	–	0
Boston College		–		8	–	2	–	0
Utah State		–		8	–	2	–	0
Villanova		–		7	–	3	–	0
Buffalo		–		6	–	3	–	0
Oregon		–		6	–	3	–	1
Houston		–		7	–	4	–	0
Miami (FL)		–		7	–	4	–	0
Army		–		6	–	4	–	0
Holy Cross		–		6	–	4	–	0
Louisville		–		6	–	4	–	0
Xavier		–		6	–	4	–	0
Florida State		–		4	–	3	–	3
Air Force		–		5	–	5	–	0
Montana		–		5	–	5	–	0
Navy		–		5	–	5	–	0
Notre Dame		–		5	–	5	–	0
Pacific (CA)		–		5	–	5	–	0
Pittsburgh		–		5	–	5	–	0
Syracuse		–		5	–	5	–	0
Texas Western		–		4	–	5	–	0
New Mexico State		–		4	–	6	–	0
Colgate		–		3	–	5	–	1
Idaho		–		2	–	6	–	1
San Jose State		–		2	–	8	–	1
Boston University		–		2	–	7	–	0
Dayton		–		2	–	8	–	0
Detroit		–		1	–	8	–	0
Hardin–Simmons		–		1	–	9	–	0
Colorado State		–		0	–	10	–	0
Rankings from AP Poll

The 1962 Oregon Ducks football team represented the University of Oregon during the 1962 NCAA University Division football season. In their twelfth season under head coach Len Casanova and fourth as an independent, the Ducks compiled a 6–3–1 record and outscored their opponents 229 to 156. Three home games were played on campus at Hayward Field in Eugene and one at Multnomah Stadium in Portland.

The team's statistical leaders included Bob Berry with 995 passing yards and Mel Renfro with 753 rushing yards and 298 receiving yards.

In October, Oregon traveled to Air Force to play in the dedication game for the new Falcon Stadium, which included a flyover by the Thunderbirds. This was during the early stages of the Cuban Missile Crisis, which was disclosed to the nation by President John F. Kennedy two days later on Monday.

== Schedule ==
Date	Opponent	Site	Result	Attendance	Source
September 22	at No. 2 Texas	Memorial Stadium; Austin, TX	L 13–25	50,000	
September 29	Utah	Hayward Field; Eugene, OR	W 35–8	18,800	
October 6	San Jose State	Hayward Field; Eugene, OR	W 14–0	15,700	
October 13	at Rice	Rice Stadium; Houston, TX	W 31–12	30,000	
October 20	at Air Force	Falcon Stadium; Colorado Springs, CO	W 35–20	33,243–33,343	
October 27	at No. 8 Washington	Husky Stadium; Seattle, WA (rivalry)	T 21–21	56,823	
November 3	Stanford	Multnomah Stadium; Portland, OR	W 28–14	29,805	
November 10	Washington State^{†}	Hayward Field; Eugene, OR	W 28–10	19,400	
November 17	at Ohio State	Ohio Stadium; Columbus, OH	L 7–26	72,828	
November 24	at Oregon State	Parker Stadium; Corvallis, OR (Civil War)	L 17–20	28,447	
^{†}Homecoming; Rankings from AP Poll released prior to the game; Source:

== Roster ==
- QB Bob Berry, So.
- HB Mel Renfro, Jr.
