= 1962 West Texas State Buffaloes football team =

American college football season

1962 West Texas State Buffaloes football

Sun Bowl champion

Sun Bowl, W 15–13 vs. Ohio
- Conference: Independent
- Record: 9–2
- Head coach: Joe Kerbel (3rd season)
- Home stadium: Buffalo Bowl

1962 NCAA University Division independents football records
	Conf.			Overall
Team	W	L	T	W		L		T
Memphis State		–		8	–	1	–	0
Oregon State		–		9	–	2	–	0
No. 9 Penn State		–		9	–	2	–	0
West Texas State		–		9	–	2	–	0
Boston College		–		8	–	2	–	0
Utah State		–		8	–	2	–	0
Villanova		–		7	–	3	–	0
Buffalo		–		6	–	3	–	0
Oregon		–		6	–	3	–	1
Houston		–		7	–	4	–	0
Miami (FL)		–		7	–	4	–	0
Army		–		6	–	4	–	0
Holy Cross		–		6	–	4	–	0
Louisville		–		6	–	4	–	0
Xavier		–		6	–	4	–	0
Florida State		–		4	–	3	–	3
Air Force		–		5	–	5	–	0
Montana		–		5	–	5	–	0
Navy		–		5	–	5	–	0
Notre Dame		–		5	–	5	–	0
Pacific (CA)		–		5	–	5	–	0
Pittsburgh		–		5	–	5	–	0
Syracuse		–		5	–	5	–	0
Texas Western		–		4	–	5	–	0
New Mexico State		–		4	–	6	–	0
Colgate		–		3	–	5	–	1
Idaho		–		2	–	6	–	1
San Jose State		–		2	–	8	–	1
Boston University		–		2	–	7	–	0
Dayton		–		2	–	8	–	0
Detroit		–		1	–	8	–	0
Hardin–Simmons		–		1	–	9	–	0
Colorado State		–		0	–	10	–	0
Rankings from AP Poll

The 1962 West Texas State Buffaloes football team was an American football team that represented West Texas State College (now known as West Texas A&M University) as an independent during the 1962 NCAA University Division football season. In its third season under head coach Joe Kerbel, the team compiled a 9–2 record, defeated Ohio in the 1962 Sun Bowl, and outscored all opponents by a total of 312 to 115. The team played its home games at the Buffalo Bowl (later renamed Kimbrough Memorial Stadium) in Canyon, Texas.

On offense, the team averaged 28.4 points per game. On defense, the team intercepted 25 passes and totaled 529 interception return yards, both of which remain school records. Jerry Logan's 99-yard interception return against Arizona State on October 13, 1962, also remains a school record.

The team's statistical leaders included Jim Dawson with 652 passing yards, Pete Pedro with 831 rushing yards, Jerry Richardson with 22 receptions and 282 receiving yards, and Jerry Logan with 13 touchdowns.

== Schedule ==
Date	Opponent	Site	Result	Attendance	Source
September 15	Trinity (TX)	Buffalo Bowl; Canyon, TX	W 61–0	16,000	
September 22	at Texas Tech	Jones Stadium; Lubbock, TX	W 30–27	41,000	
September 29	Texas Western	Buffalo Bowl; Canyon, TX	W 49–0	14,000	
October 6	Arlington State	Buffalo Bowl; Canyon, TX	W 49–0	13,000–14,000	
October 13	at Arizona State	Sun Devil Stadium; Tempe, AZ	W 15–14	26,379	
October 20	New Mexico State^{†}	Buffalo Bowl; Canyon, TX	W 20–12	19,800	
October 27	at Arizona	Arizona Stadium; Tucson, AZ	L 3–8	22,000	
November 3	Bowling Green	Buffalo Bowl; Canyon, TX	W 23–7	19,000	
November 10	at North Texas State	Fouts Field; Denton, TX	L 13–20	9,000	
November 17	at Hardin–Simmons	Shotwell Stadium; Abilene, TX	W 34–13	4,000	
December 31	vs. Ohio	Kidd Field; El Paso, TX (Sun Bowl)	W 15–14	13,000–16,000	
^{†}Homecoming
