= 1962 Miami Redskins football team =

American college football season

1962 Miami Redskins football

Tangerine Bowl, L 21–49 vs. Houston
- Conference: Mid-American Conference
- Record: 8–2–1 (3–1–1 MAC)
- Head coach: John Pont (7th season)
- MVPs: Bob Jencks; Tom Nomina
- Captains: Gerry Myers; Tom Nomina
- Home stadium: Miami Field

1962 Mid-American Conference football standings
	Conf.					Overall
Team	W		L		T	W		L		T
Bowling Green $	5	–	0	–	1	7	–	1	–	1
Ohio	5	–	1	–	0	8	–	3	–	0
Miami (OH)	3	–	1	–	1	8	–	2	–	1
Western Michigan	3	–	3	–	0	5	–	4	–	0
Kent State	2	–	4	–	0	3	–	6	–	0
Toledo	1	–	5	–	0	3	–	6	–	0
Marshall	0	–	5	–	0	4	–	6	–	0
$ – Conference champion

The 1962 Miami Redskins football team was an American football team that represented Miami University in the Mid-American Conference (MAC) during the 1962 NCAA University Division football season. In its seventh and final season under head coach John Pont, Miami compiled an 8–2–1 record (3–1–1 against MAC opponents), finished in third place in the MAC, lost to Houston in the 1962 Tangerine Bowl, and outscored all opponents by a combined total of 241 to 175. The season included a 10-7 victory over No. 9 ranked Purdue a victory ranked among the greatest victories in program history.

The team's statistical leaders included quarterback Ernie Kellermann with 856 passing yards, Scott Tyler with 538 rushing yards, and Bob Jencks with 426 receiving yards.

Gerry Myers and Tom Nomina were the team captains. Nomina and Bob Jencks shared the team's most valuable player award.

== Schedule ==
Date	Opponent	Site	Result	Attendance	Source
September 15	at Xavier*	Xavier Stadium; Cincinnati, OH	W 23–14	13,651	
September 22	Quantico Marines*	Miami Field; Oxford, OH	W 16–0	8,645	
September 29	Western Michigan	Miami Field; Oxford, OH	W 17–7	7,280	
October 6	Kent State	Miami Field; Oxford, OH	W 23–14	10,958	
October 13	at No. 9 Purdue*	Ross–Ade Stadium; West Lafayette, IN	W 10–7	49,496	
October 20	at Ohio	Peden Stadium; Athens, OH (rivalry)	L 6–12	16,000	
October 27	Bowling Green	Miami Field; Oxford, OH	T 24–24	14,983	
November 3	at Toledo	Glass Bowl; Toledo, OH	W 21–12	6,562	
November 10	Dayton*	Miami Field; Oxford, OH	W 42–20	11,735	
November 17	at Cincinnati*	Nippert Stadium; Cincinnati, OH (rivalry)	W 38–16	10,500	
December 22	vs. Houston*	Tangerine Bowl; Orlando, FL (Tangerine Bowl)	L 21–49	7,500	
*Non-conference game; Rankings from AP Poll released prior to the game; Source:
