= 1962 Holy Cross Crusaders football team =

American college football season

1962 Holy Cross Crusaders football
- Conference: Independent
- Record: 6–4
- Head coach: Eddie Anderson (19th season)
- Captains: Thomas Hennessey; Dennis Golden
- Home stadium: Fitton Field

1962 NCAA University Division independents football records
| | Conf. | | | Overall |
| Team | W | L | T | W | | L | | T |
|---|---|---|---|---|---|---|---|---|
| Memphis State | | – | | 8 | – | 1 | – | 0 |
| Oregon State | | – | | 9 | – | 2 | – | 0 |
| No. 9 Penn State | | – | | 9 | – | 2 | – | 0 |
| West Texas State | | – | | 9 | – | 2 | – | 0 |
| Boston College | | – | | 8 | – | 2 | – | 0 |
| Utah State | | – | | 8 | – | 2 | – | 0 |
| Villanova | | – | | 7 | – | 3 | – | 0 |
| Buffalo | | – | | 6 | – | 3 | – | 0 |
| Oregon | | – | | 6 | – | 3 | – | 1 |
| Houston | | – | | 7 | – | 4 | – | 0 |
| Miami (FL) | | – | | 7 | – | 4 | – | 0 |
| Army | | – | | 6 | – | 4 | – | 0 |
| Holy Cross | | – | | 6 | – | 4 | – | 0 |
| Louisville | | – | | 6 | – | 4 | – | 0 |
| Xavier | | – | | 6 | – | 4 | – | 0 |
| Florida State | | – | | 4 | – | 3 | – | 3 |
| Air Force | | – | | 5 | – | 5 | – | 0 |
| Montana | | – | | 5 | – | 5 | – | 0 |
| Navy | | – | | 5 | – | 5 | – | 0 |
| Notre Dame | | – | | 5 | – | 5 | – | 0 |
| Pacific (CA) | | – | | 5 | – | 5 | – | 0 |
| Pittsburgh | | – | | 5 | – | 5 | – | 0 |
| Syracuse | | – | | 5 | – | 5 | – | 0 |
| Texas Western | | – | | 4 | – | 5 | – | 0 |
| New Mexico State | | – | | 4 | – | 6 | – | 0 |
| Colgate | | – | | 3 | – | 5 | – | 1 |
| Idaho | | – | | 2 | – | 6 | – | 1 |
| San Jose State | | – | | 2 | – | 8 | – | 1 |
| Boston University | | – | | 2 | – | 7 | – | 0 |
| Dayton | | – | | 2 | – | 8 | – | 0 |
| Detroit | | – | | 1 | – | 8 | – | 0 |
| Hardin–Simmons | | – | | 1 | – | 9 | – | 0 |
| Colorado State | | – | | 0 | – | 10 | – | 0 |
Rankings from AP Poll

The 1962 Holy Cross Crusaders football team was an American football team that represented the College of the Holy Cross as an independent during the 1962 NCAA University Division football season. Eddie Anderson returned for the 13th consecutive year as head coach, his 19th year overall. The team compiled a record of 6–4.

All home games were played at Fitton Field on the Holy Cross campus in Worcester, Massachusetts.

== Schedule ==
| Date | Opponent | Site | Result | Attendance | Source |
|---|---|---|---|---|---|
| September 29 | Buffalo | Fitton Field; Worcester, MA | W 16–6 | 12,000 | |
| October 6 | at Colgate | Colgate Athletic Field; Hamilton, NY | W 22–0 | 7,500 | |
| October 13 | at Harvard | Harvard Stadium; Boston, MA | W 34–20 | 23,000 | |
| October 20 | at Dartmouth | Memorial Field; Hanover, NH | L 0–10 | 13,909 | |
| October 27 | Syracuse^{†} | Fitton Field; Worcester, MA | L 20–30 | 20,000 | |
| November 3 | at Dayton | Baujan Field; Dayton, OH | W 36–14 | 7,750 | |
| November 10 | VMI^ | Fitton Field; Worcester, MA | W 20–14 | 10,000 | |
| November 17 | Penn State | Fitton Field; Worcester, MA | L 20–48 | 20,000 | |
| November 24 | Connecticut | Fitton Field; Worcester, MA | W 34–16 | 9,000 | |
| December 1 | at Boston College | Alumni Stadium; Chestnut Hill, MA (rivalry) | L 12–48 | 27,000 | |
^{†}Homecoming; ^ Family Weekend

== Statistical leaders ==
Statistical leaders for the 1962 Crusaders included:

- Rushing: Pat McCarthy, 454 yards and 12 touchdowns on 148 attempts
- Passing: Pat McCarthy, 1,267 yards, 85 completions and 8 touchdowns on 194 attempts
- Receiving: Al Snyder, 716 yards and 6 touchdowns on 41 receptions
- Scoring: Pat McCarthy, 80 points from 12 touchdowns and 4 two-point conversions
- Total offense: Pat McCarthy, 1,721 yards (1,267 passing, 454 rushing)
- All-purpose yards: Al Snyder, 1,116 yards (716 receiving, 237 rushing, 163 returning)
