= 1962 Villanova Wildcats football team =

American college football season

1962 Villanova Wildcats football

Liberty Bowl, L 0–6 vs. Oregon State
- Conference: Independent
- Record: 7–3
- Head coach: Alexander F. Bell (3rd season)
- Captain: Charlie Johnson
- Home stadium: Villanova Stadium

1962 NCAA University Division independents football records
| | Conf. | | | Overall |
| Team | W | L | T | W | | L | | T |
|---|---|---|---|---|---|---|---|---|
| Memphis State | | – | | 8 | – | 1 | – | 0 |
| Oregon State | | – | | 9 | – | 2 | – | 0 |
| No. 9 Penn State | | – | | 9 | – | 2 | – | 0 |
| West Texas State | | – | | 9 | – | 2 | – | 0 |
| Boston College | | – | | 8 | – | 2 | – | 0 |
| Utah State | | – | | 8 | – | 2 | – | 0 |
| Villanova | | – | | 7 | – | 3 | – | 0 |
| Buffalo | | – | | 6 | – | 3 | – | 0 |
| Oregon | | – | | 6 | – | 3 | – | 1 |
| Houston | | – | | 7 | – | 4 | – | 0 |
| Miami (FL) | | – | | 7 | – | 4 | – | 0 |
| Army | | – | | 6 | – | 4 | – | 0 |
| Holy Cross | | – | | 6 | – | 4 | – | 0 |
| Louisville | | – | | 6 | – | 4 | – | 0 |
| Xavier | | – | | 6 | – | 4 | – | 0 |
| Florida State | | – | | 4 | – | 3 | – | 3 |
| Air Force | | – | | 5 | – | 5 | – | 0 |
| Montana | | – | | 5 | – | 5 | – | 0 |
| Navy | | – | | 5 | – | 5 | – | 0 |
| Notre Dame | | – | | 5 | – | 5 | – | 0 |
| Pacific (CA) | | – | | 5 | – | 5 | – | 0 |
| Pittsburgh | | – | | 5 | – | 5 | – | 0 |
| Syracuse | | – | | 5 | – | 5 | – | 0 |
| Texas Western | | – | | 4 | – | 5 | – | 0 |
| New Mexico State | | – | | 4 | – | 6 | – | 0 |
| Colgate | | – | | 3 | – | 5 | – | 1 |
| Idaho | | – | | 2 | – | 6 | – | 1 |
| San Jose State | | – | | 2 | – | 8 | – | 1 |
| Boston University | | – | | 2 | – | 7 | – | 0 |
| Dayton | | – | | 2 | – | 8 | – | 0 |
| Detroit | | – | | 1 | – | 8 | – | 0 |
| Hardin–Simmons | | – | | 1 | – | 9 | – | 0 |
| Colorado State | | – | | 0 | – | 10 | – | 0 |
Rankings from AP Poll

The 1962 Villanova Wildcats football team represented the Villanova University as an independent during the 1962 NCAA University Division football season. The head coach was Alexander F. Bell, coaching his third season with the Wildcats. The team played their home games at Villanova Stadium in Villanova, Pennsylvania.

== Schedule ==
| Date | Opponent | Site | TV | Result | Attendance | Source |
|---|---|---|---|---|---|---|
| September 15 | West Chester* | Villanova Stadium; Villanova, PA | | W 31–6 | 12,000 | |
| September 22 | VMI | Villanova Stadium; Villanova, PA | | W 24–0 | 8,000–8,500 | |
| September 29 | Boston College | Villanova Stadium; Villanova, PA | | L 13–28 | 13,000 | |
| October 6 | at Buffalo | Rotary Field; Buffalo, NY | | W 36–6 | 9,685 | |
| October 20 | at Delaware | Delaware Stadium; Newark, DE (rivalry) | | W 22–10 | 8,800–9,200 | |
| October 27 | Xavier | Villanova Stadium; Villanova, PA | | W 16–8 | 12,000 | |
| November 3 | Detroit^{†} | Villanova Stadium; Villanova, PA | | W 14–0 | 3,000 / 9,500 (paid) | |
| November 10 | UMass* | Villanova Stadium; Villanova, PA | | L 18–19 | 8,000 | |
| November 17 | at Rutgers | Rutgers Stadium; New Brunswick, NJ | | W 34–12 | 19,500 | |
| December 15 | vs. Oregon State | Philadelphia Municipal Stadium; Philadelphia, PA (Liberty Bowl) | NBC | L 0–6 | 17,048 | |
*Non-conference game; ^{†}Homecoming; Source:
