= 1962 Notre Dame Fighting Irish football team =

American college football season

1962 Notre Dame Fighting Irish football
- Conference: Independent
- Record: 5–5
- Head coach: Joe Kuharich (4th season)
- Captain: Mike Lind
- Home stadium: Notre Dame Stadium

1962 NCAA University Division independents football records
	Conf.			Overall
Team	W	L	T	W		L		T
Memphis State		–		8	–	1	–	0
Oregon State		–		9	–	2	–	0
No. 9 Penn State		–		9	–	2	–	0
West Texas State		–		9	–	2	–	0
Boston College		–		8	–	2	–	0
Utah State		–		8	–	2	–	0
Villanova		–		7	–	3	–	0
Buffalo		–		6	–	3	–	0
Oregon		–		6	–	3	–	1
Houston		–		7	–	4	–	0
Miami (FL)		–		7	–	4	–	0
Army		–		6	–	4	–	0
Holy Cross		–		6	–	4	–	0
Louisville		–		6	–	4	–	0
Xavier		–		6	–	4	–	0
Florida State		–		4	–	3	–	3
Air Force		–		5	–	5	–	0
Montana		–		5	–	5	–	0
Navy		–		5	–	5	–	0
Notre Dame		–		5	–	5	–	0
Pacific (CA)		–		5	–	5	–	0
Pittsburgh		–		5	–	5	–	0
Syracuse		–		5	–	5	–	0
Texas Western		–		4	–	5	–	0
New Mexico State		–		4	–	6	–	0
Colgate		–		3	–	5	–	1
Idaho		–		2	–	6	–	1
San Jose State		–		2	–	8	–	1
Boston University		–		2	–	7	–	0
Dayton		–		2	–	8	–	0
Detroit		–		1	–	8	–	0
Hardin–Simmons		–		1	–	9	–	0
Colorado State		–		0	–	10	–	0
Rankings from AP Poll

The 1962 Notre Dame Fighting Irish football team was an American football team that represented the University of Notre Dame as an independent during the 1962 NCAA University Division football season. In their fourth and final year under head coach Joe Kuharich, the Irish compiled a 5–5 record and were outscored by a total of 192 to 159. In two games against ranked opponents, they lost to No. 3 Northwestern and No. 1 USC

No Notre Dame players received first-team honors on the 1962 All-America college football team. The team's statistical leaders included Daryle Lamonica (821 passing yards), Don Hogan (454 rushing yards), and Jim Kelly (523 receiving yards).

In March 1963, Kuharich left Notre Dame to become supervisor of officials in the National Football League. Kuharich compiled a 17–23 record in four years as Notre Dame's head coach.

The team played its home games at Notre Dame Stadium in Notre Dame, Indiana.

== Schedule ==
Date	Opponent	Site	Result	Attendance	Source
September 29	at No. 6 Oklahoma	Oklahoma Memorial Stadium; Norman, OK	W 13–7	60,500	
October 6	Purdue	Notre Dame Stadium; Notre Dame, IN (rivalry)	L 6–24	61,296	
October 13	at Wisconsin	Camp Randall Stadium; Madison, WI	L 8–17	61,098	
October 20	Michigan State	Notre Dame Stadium; Notre Dame, IN (rivalry)	L 7–31	60,116	
October 27	at No. 3 Northwestern	Dyche Stadium; Evanston, IL (rivalry)	L 6–35	55,752	
November 3	vs. Navy	Philadelphia Municipal Stadium; Philadelphia, PA (rivalry)	W 20–12	35,000	
November 10	Pittsburgh	Notre Dame Stadium; Notre Dame, IN (rivalry)	W 43–22	52,215	
November 17	North Carolina	Notre Dame Stadium; Notre Dame, IN (rivalry)	W 21–7	35,553	
November 24	Iowa	Notre Dame Stadium; Notre Dame, IN	W 35–12	42,653	
December 1	at No. 1 USC	Los Angeles Memorial Coliseum; Los Angeles, CA (rivalry)	L 0–25	81,676	
Rankings from AP Poll released prior to the game; Source:

== Personnel ==
1962 Notre Dame Fighting Irish football team roster
Players
Coaches
Offense

Pos.	#	Name	Class
HB		John Atamian	So
G		Jim Carroll	So
QB		Daryle Lamonica	Sr
HB		Jack Snow	So

Defense

Pos.	#	Name	Class

Special teams

Pos.	#	Name	Class

Head coach

- Joe Kuharich

Coordinators/assistant coaches

Legend

- (C) Team captain
- (S) Suspended
- (I) Ineligible
- Injured
- Redshirt

== 1963 NFL draft ==
Rnd.	Pick	Team	Player	Pos.	College	Notes
10		Chicago Bears	Ed Hoerster	LB		
12		Green Bay Packers	Daryle Lamonica	QB		
16		St. Louis Cardinals	John Slafkosky	T		
