= 1962 Pittsburgh Panthers football team =

American college football season

1962 Pittsburgh Panthers football
- Conference: Independent
- Record: 5–5
- Head coach: John Michelosen (8th season)
- Home stadium: Pitt Stadium

1962 NCAA University Division independents football records
	Conf.			Overall
Team	W	L	T	W		L		T
Memphis State		–		8	–	1	–	0
Oregon State		–		9	–	2	–	0
No. 9 Penn State		–		9	–	2	–	0
West Texas State		–		9	–	2	–	0
Boston College		–		8	–	2	–	0
Utah State		–		8	–	2	–	0
Villanova		–		7	–	3	–	0
Buffalo		–		6	–	3	–	0
Oregon		–		6	–	3	–	1
Houston		–		7	–	4	–	0
Miami (FL)		–		7	–	4	–	0
Army		–		6	–	4	–	0
Holy Cross		–		6	–	4	–	0
Louisville		–		6	–	4	–	0
Xavier		–		6	–	4	–	0
Florida State		–		4	–	3	–	3
Air Force		–		5	–	5	–	0
Montana		–		5	–	5	–	0
Navy		–		5	–	5	–	0
Notre Dame		–		5	–	5	–	0
Pacific (CA)		–		5	–	5	–	0
Pittsburgh		–		5	–	5	–	0
Syracuse		–		5	–	5	–	0
Texas Western		–		4	–	5	–	0
New Mexico State		–		4	–	6	–	0
Colgate		–		3	–	5	–	1
Idaho		–		2	–	6	–	1
San Jose State		–		2	–	8	–	1
Boston University		–		2	–	7	–	0
Dayton		–		2	–	8	–	0
Detroit		–		1	–	8	–	0
Hardin–Simmons		–		1	–	9	–	0
Colorado State		–		0	–	10	–	0
Rankings from AP Poll

The 1962 Pittsburgh Panthers football team represented the University of Pittsburgh as an independent during the 1962 NCAA University Division football season. The team compiled a 5–5 record under head coach John Michelosen. The team played its home games at Pitt Stadium in Pittsburgh. The team's statistical leaders included Jim Traficant with 611 passing yards and Rick Leeson with 481 rushing yards.

== Schedule ==
Date	Opponent	Site	Result	Attendance	Source
September 15	Miami (FL)	Pitt Stadium; Pittsburgh, PA	L 14–23	32,756	
September 29	at Baylor	Baylor Stadium; Waco, TX	W 24–14	25,000	
October 6	at California	California Memorial Stadium; Berkeley, CA	W 26–24	27,000	
October 13	West Virginia	Pitt Stadium; Pittsburgh, PA (rivalry)	L 8–15	34,091	
October 20	UCLA	Pitt Stadium; Pittsburgh, PA	W 8–6	40,419	
October 27	vs. Navy	Foreman Field; Norfolk, VA	L 9–32	32,000	
November 3	Syracuse	Pitt Stadium; Pittsburgh, PA (rivalry)	W 24–6	23,473	
November 10	at Notre Dame	Notre Dame Stadium; Notre Dame, IN (rivalry)	L 22–43	52,215	
November 17	at Army	Yankee Stadium; The Bronx, NY	W 7–6	23,917	
November 24	No. 9 Penn State	Pitt Stadium; Pittsburgh, PA (rivalry)	L 0–16	45,149	
Rankings from AP Poll released prior to the game

== Preseason ==
On March 19, Coach Michelosen welcomed 75 players for his eighth edition of spring workouts. The NCAA allowed the Panthers 35 days to fit in 20 days of practice. Michelosen welcomed two new coaches to his staff. Frank Lauterbur coached the tackles and directed the defense. Ernie Hefferle coached the ends. The annual Spring Practice game was held on April 28, and televised by WIIC. The Blues routed the Whites 42–0.

On August 19, 77 candidates (including 24 lettermen) left Pittsburgh for Meadville, PA to start fall camp on the Allegheny College grounds. The squad trained there for two weeks, and then returned to Pittsburgh for school registration, plus two more weeks of practice for their opening game.

Seniors Tom Brown (guard) and Gary Kaltenbach (tackle) were named honorary captains for the season.

== Game summaries ==
=== Miami (FL) ===
Week 1: Miami at Pitt

Team	1	2	3	4	Total
• Miami	0	10	7	6	23
Pitt	0	6	0	8	14

- Date: September 15, 1962
- Location: Pitt Stadium
  Pittsburgh, PA
- Game start: 1:30 p.m.
- Game attendance: 32,756
- Game weather: warm and overcast
- Referee: David Buchanan (ECAC)

Scoring summary
2	MIAMI	Bobby Wilson 25-yard field goal	MIAMI 3–0
2	MIAMI	Nick Spinelli 1-yard run (Wilson kick)	MIAMI 10–0
2	PITT	Al Grigaliunas 9-yard pass from Paul Martha (run failed)	MIAMI 10–6
3	MIAMI	Spinelli 8-yard run (Wilson kick)	MIAMI 17–6
3	MIAMI	Jack Sims 15-yard pass (kick failed)	MIAMI 23–6
4	PITT	Ed Clark 4-yard run (John Jenkins pass from Jim Traficant)	MIAMI 23–14

The Panthers opened the 1962 season against Andy Gustafson's Miami Hurricanes. Pitt led the all-time series 4–3 and had won the past two meetings. The Hurricanes were led by All-American quarterback George Mira.

Miami beat the Panthers 23–14. The first quarter was scoreless, as both teams failed on fake field goal attempts. Early in the second period, Miami recovered an Ed Clark fumble on the Panthers' 32-yard line. They drove to the seven and Bobby Wilson's partially blocked field goal barely made it over the cross-bar for the 3 points. Pitt answered with a drive to the Miami 2-yard line. The Miami defense held and took over on downs. They then drove the 97 yards in 13 plays, with Nick Spinelli running the final yard for the touchdown. Wilson added the extra point for a 10–0 Miami lead. Before halftime, the Panthers scored on a 9-yard pass from Paul Martha to Al Grigaliunas to complete a 59-yard drive. The two-point conversion failed. Miami took the second half kick-off and drove 73-yards in 8 plays. Spinelli scored his second touchdown on an 8-yard run. Wilson added the extra point. Miami added another score in the final period on a Mira to Jack Sims 15-yard pass. The extra point failed. Pitt scored in the final minute on an Ed Clark 4-yard run, and Jim Traficant passed to John Jenkins for the two-point conversion.

Pitt earned 16 first downs and gained 325 total yards. Miami had 24 first downs and gained 450 total yards. Jim Traficant completed 9 of 20 passes for 124 yards. Ed Clark led the Pitt rushers with 55 yards on 10 carries. Rick Leeson gained 51 yards on 4 carries. Miami quarterback George Mira completed 13 of 25 passes for 162 yards, and ran 10 times for 86 yards.

The Pitt starting line-up for the game against Miami was Al Grigaliunas (left end), Gary Kaltenbach (left tackle), Tom Brown (left guard), Paul Cercel (center), Ralph Conrad (right guard), Ed Adamchik (right tackle), Robert Long (right end), Jim Traficant (quarterback), Ed Clark (left halfback), Paul Martha (right halfback) and John Telesky (fullback). Substitutes appearing in the game for Pitt were William Howley, Eugene Sobolewski, John Maczuzak, Bob Ostrosky, Jeff Ware, Charles Ahlborn, Martin Schottenheimer, John Holzbach, John Draksler, John Price, Ernie Borghetti, Ronald Linaburg, John Jenkins, Joe Kuzneski, Fred Mazurek, Francis Novak, Glenn Lehner, Peter Billey, Robert Roeder, John Ozimek, William Bodle, Dennis Chillinsky, Rick Leeson and Lou Slaby.

=== at Baylor ===
Week 2: Pitt at Baylor

Team	1	2	3	4	Total
• Pitt	0	14	10	0	24
Baylor	0	7	0	7	14

- Date: September 29, 1962
- Location: Baylor Stadium
  Waco, TX
- Game start: 8:00 p.m.
- Game attendance: 25,000
- Game weather: warm
- Referee: C. W. “Napper” Davis

Scoring summary
2	PITT	William Howley 2-yard pass from Fred Mazurek (Rick Leeson kick)	PITT 7–0
2	PITT	Leeson 6-yard run (Leeson kick)	PITT 14–0
2	BAY	Jim Ingram 5-yard pass from Don Trull (Carl Choate kick)	PITT 14–7
3	PITT	Leeson 26-yard field goal	PITT 17–7
3	PITT	Martha 18-yard run (Leeson kick)	PITT 24–7
4	BAY	Larry Elkins 8-yard pass from Trull (Choate kick)	PITT 24–14

Pitt's first road trip was to Waco, Texas to play the Baylor Bears. Coach John Bridgers' Bears beat the Panthers (16–13) last season at Pittsburgh in the first game of the series. Both teams lost their opening game of this season. The Bears were led by All-American quarterback candidate Don Trull.

Coach Michelosen had to alter his lineup after starting center Paul Cercel and linebacker Jeffrey Ware were suspended for fighting with police officers following the Miami loss. He replaced Cercel with Charles Ahlborn at center, and inserted Rick Leeson at fullback, Peter Billey at halfback and John Jenkins at end.

Pitt notched their first win in the state of Texas 24–14. In the second quarter, the Panthers gained possession on their 18-yard line, and needed 19 plays to score. A 2-yard pass from Fred Mazurek to William Howley ended the drive. Rick Leeson booted the extra point. Baylor answered with a drive of their own, but the Pitt defense stiffened and held on downs at the Pitt 15-yard line. Pitt's offense engineered another long drive that was capped with a Leeson 6-yard run and extra point for a 14–0 lead. Baylor quarterback Don Trull engineered an 80-yard drive for Baylor's first touchdown. A 5-yard pass to Jim Ingram and an extra point by Carl Choate cut the lead to 14–7 at halftime. The Pitt defense forced a punt on Baylor's first possession of the second half. They gained possession on the Baylor 41-yard line and drove to the Baylor 9. On fourth down Leeson kicked a 28-yard field goal for a 10 point lead. Then John Telesky intercepted a Trull pass on the Panthers' 39-yard line. It took 9 plays to go 61 yards, with Paul Martha going the final 18 on a reverse around left end. Leeson's placement made it 24–7. Baylor scored against the scrubs with a minute to go on a Trull 8-yard pass to Lawrence Elkins. Choate kicked the extra point.

Pitt earned 23 first downs and gained 374 yards. Baylor countered with 16 first downs and 278 yards. Ed Clark led the Panthers with 86 yards on 10 carries. Rick Leeson added 64 yards on 9 carries. Quarterback Don Trull led the Baylor rushing with 34 yards on 3 carries, and completed 12 of 20 passes for 157 yards.

The Pitt starting line-up for the game against Baylor was Al Grigaliunas (left end), Gary Kaltenbach (left tackle), Tom Brown (left guard), Charles Ahlborn (center), Ralph Conrad (right guard), Ed Adamchik (right tackle), Robert Long (right end), Jim Traficant (quarterback), Ed Clark (left halfback), Paul Martha (right halfback) and John Telesky (fullback). Substitutes appearing in the game for Pitt were William Howley, Eugene Sobolewski, John Maczuzak, Bob Ostrosky, Ray Popp, John Zabcar, Martin Schottenheimer, John Holzbach, John Draksler, Robert Sorochak, John Price, Ernie Borghetti, Ronald Linaburg, John Jenkins, Joe Kuzneski, Fred Mazurek, Francis Novak, Glenn Lehner, Peter Billey, Robert Roeder, John Ozimek, William Bodle, Rick Leeson, Lou Slaby and Bernard LaQuinta.

=== at California ===
Week 3: Pitt at California

Team	1	2	3	4	Total
• Pitt	13	7	6	0	26
California	6	3	8	7	24

- Date: October 6, 1962
- Location: California Memorial Stadium
  Berkeley, CA
- Game start: 1:30 p.m.
- Game attendance: 27,000
- Game weather: fair and cool
- Referee: Francis Brennan

Scoring summary
1	CAL	Gold 3-yard run (kick failed)	CAL 6–0
1	PITT	Paul Martha 37-yard pass from Jim Traficant (Rick Leeson kick)	PITT 7–6
1	PITT	William Howley 46-yard pass from Traficant (kick failed)	PITT 13–6
2	PITT	Traficant 22-yard run (Leeson kick)	PITT 20–6
2	CAL	Tom Blanchfield 35-yard field goal	PITT 20–9
3	CAL	Alan Nelson 7-yard pass from Larry Balliett (Bill Krum pass from Balliett)	PITT 20–17
3	PITT	Martha 77-yard run (run failed)	PITT 26–17
4	CAL	Rudy Carvajal 4-yard run (Blanchfield kick)	PITT 26–24

The Panthers second road game was to the west coast to play the California Bears. Both teams were 1–1 on the season and the head-to-head record was 1–1. The Bears future Hall of Fame coach Marv Levy was in his fourth season at Cal, and his assistant was future Hall of Fame coach Bill Walsh. Coach Michelosen had to alter the Pitt line-up due to injuries to centers Charles Ahlborn and John Holzbach, end John Jenkins, quarterback Fred Mazurek and halfback Bob Roeder. While the Pitt charter flight stopped in Colorado Springs to refuel before continuing on to San Francisco, the squad held a workout on the Air Force Academy field.

On October 6, the Panthers beat the California Bears 26–24 for their second win of the season in front of 27,000 fans at California Memorial Stadium. The Panthers won this game with their passing attack, as quarterback Jim Traficant threw three touchdown passes. Cal scored first on a Randy Gold 3-yard run. Tom Blanchfield's extra point was wide. Then the Pitt offense scored three touchdowns: a 37-yard pass to Paul Martha, a 46-yard pass to William Howley and a 22-yard run by Traficant. Rick Leeson kicked 2 of 3 extra points and Pitt led 20–6. Cal answered with a 35-yard Blanchfield field goal right before halftime, and a third quarter 7-yard touchdown pass from Larry Balliett to Alan Nelson. A Balliett pass to Bill Krum added two more points to cut the lead to 20–17. Then Traficant padded the Pitt lead with a 77-yard touchdown pass to Martha, but the two point conversion failed. The Bears scored late on a 4-yard run by Rudy Carvajal and Blanchfield kicked the extra point.

Pitt only earned 12 first downs to Cal's 18, but out-gained the Bears 374 yards to 279. Rick Leeson led the Pitt ground game with 75 yards on 16 carries. Jim Traficant completed 4 of 7 passes for 169 yards and 3 touchdowns. He also ran the ball 6 times for 46 yards and 1 touchdown. Paul Martha caught 2 passes for 114 yards and two touchdowns, and he ran the ball 8 times for 34 yards.

The Pitt starting line-up for the game against California was Al Grigaliunas (left end), Gary Kaltenbach (left tackle), Tom Brown (left guard), Martin Schottenheimer (center), Ralph Conrad (right guard), Ed Adamchik (right tackle), Robert Long (right end), Jim Traficant (quarterback), Ed Clark (left halfback), Paul Martha (right halfback) and Rick Leeson (fullback). Substitutes appearing in the game for Pitt were William Howley, Eugene Sobolewski, John Maczuzak, Bob Ostrosky, Ernie Borghetti, Robert Sorochak, Joe Gudenburr, John Price, John Draksler, Charles Ahlborn, John Holzbach, Glenn Lehner, Francis Novak, Bernard LaQuinta, Peter Billey, John Ozimek, William Bodle and John Telesky.

=== West Virginia ===
Week 4: West Virginia at Pitt

Team	1	2	3	4	Total
• West Virginia	0	7	0	8	15
Pitt	0	0	8	0	8

- Date: October 13, 1962
- Location: Pitt Stadium
  Pittsburgh, PA
- Game start: 1:30 p.m.
- Game attendance: 34,091
- Game weather: sunny and mild

Scoring summary
2	WVU	Steve Berzansky 29-yard run (Glenn Bennett kick)	WVU 7–0
3	PITT	Paul Martha 34-yard run (Eugene Sobolewski pass from Jim Traficant)	PITT 8–7
4	WVU	Tom Yeater 5-yard run (Gene Heeter pass from Jerry Yost)	WVU 15–8

The fourth game of the season was the 55th renewal of the Backyard Brawl. Pitt led the series 39–14–1, but West Virginia had won three of the previous five meetings. Gene Corum's squad was unbeaten, untied and unscored upon in their first three games, but Pitt was favored by a touchdown. The Mountaineers starting line-up had 6 players from Pennsylvania: Jerry Yost, Ken Herock, Tom Woodeshick, Gene Heeter, Pete Goimarac and Keith Melenyzer.

Pitt lost their second home game 15–8 to the undefeated Mountaineers. In the second quarter West Virginia scored first on a 29-yard run by Steve Berzansky. Glenn Bennett kicked the extra point and the Mounties led at halftime 7–0. Pittsburgh went ahead in the third quarter on a 34-yard run by Paul Martha, and Jim Traficant's pass to Gene Sobolewski for two points. In the final period Pitt punted and pinned the Mountaineers on their 9-yard line. The Pitt defense allowed Tom Woodeshick to run around their right side for 49-yards to the Pitt 42-yard line. The Mountaineers' offense scored 10 plays later on a 5-yard run by Tom Yeater. A Jerry Yost pass to Gene Heeter added two points.

Jim Traficant was 8 of 16 for 114 yards and 1 interception. Rick Leeson gained 60 yards on 13 carries and Paul Martha gained 54 yards on 9 carries. Mountie halfback Tom Woodeshick gained 89 yards on 10 carries.

Charles Cosentino, oxygen therapist for the Panthers, told the Pittsburgh Press: “ It's the same every year when we play them. We use twice as much oxygen against West Virginia as any other team on the schedule.”

The Pitt starting line-up for the game against West Virginia was Al Grigaliunas (left end), Gary Kaltenbach (left tackle), Tom Brown (left guard), Charles Ahlborn (center), Ralph Conrad (right guard), Ernie Borghetti (right tackle), Robert Long (right end), Jim Traficant (quarterback), Ed Clark (left halfback), Paul Martha (right halfback) and Rick Leeson (fullback). Substitutes appearing in the game for Pitt were William Howley, Eugene Sobolewski, John Maczuzak, Bob Ostrosky, John Price, Martin Schottenheimer, John Draksler, John Holzbach, Robert Sorochak, Joe Kuzneski, Francis Novak, Glenn Lehner, Robert Roeder, Peter Billey, William Bodle, John Ozimek and John Telesky.

=== UCLA ===
Week 5: UCLA at Pitt

Team	1	2	3	4	Total
UCLA	0	0	6	0	6
• Pitt	0	0	8	0	8

- Date: October 20, 1962
- Location: Pitt Stadium
  Pittsburgh, PA
- Game start: 1:30 p.m.
- Game attendance: 40,419
- Game weather: sunny and warm
- Referee: Jack L. Sprenger (Big Five)

Scoring summary
3	PITT	Paul Martha 6–yard run (Rick Leeson pass from Jim Traficant)	PITT 8–0
3	PITT	Kermit Alexander 7-yard run with fumble (run failed)	PITT 8–6

On October 20 in front of 40,419 fans, the Panthers welcomed the UCLA Bruins for the fifth game of their schedule. Coach Bill Barnes' Bruins were 2–0 for the season and a slight (1.5 point) favorite. The all-time series was tied at 2 games apiece. Coach Michelosen had to adjust his lineup due to injuries: Ernie Borghetti replaced Ed Adamchik at right tackle, John Muczuzak replaced Gary Kaltenbach at left tackle and Marty Schottenheimer replaced Charles Ahlborn at center.

Pitt won their first home game by defeating the Bruins 8–6. The first half was scoreless and featured 11 punts. Pitt scored first on a Paul Martha 6-yard run that ended a 58-yard drive. Jim Traficant passed to Rick Leeson for the 2-point conversion and 8–0 lead. UCLA answered with an 81-yard drive to the Pitt 1/2-yard line. Quarterback Larry Zeno handed the ball to Warren Jackson who fumbled, but Kermit Alexander picked it up and ran into the end zone. The 2-point conversion failed and Pitt led 8–6. Pitt answered with a 67-yard drive to the UCLA 2-yard line. Pitt back Bob Roeder fumbled and UCLA recovered. They marched to the Panthers 22-yard line, and Zeno was wide on a 29-yard field goal. The teams traded interceptions and Pitt was finally able to run out the clock for the victory.

Pitt had 17 first downs and gained 287 total yards. Paul Martha gained 107 yards on 20 carries and caught 2 passes for 25 yards.Ed Clark gained 70 yards on 11 carries. Jim Traficant completed 7 of 10 passes for 68 yards.

The Pitt starting line-up for the game against UCLA was Al Grigaliunas (left end), John Maczuzak (left tackle), Tom Brown (left guard), Martin Schottenheimer (center), Ralph Conrad (right guard), Ernie Borghetti (right tackle), Robert Long (right end), JimTraficant (quarterback), Ed Clark (left halfback), Paul Martha (right halfback) and Rick Leeson (fullback). Substitutes appearing in the game for Pitt were William Howley, Eugene Sobolewski, Joe Gudenburr, Gary Kaltenbach, Bob Ostrosky, John Draksler, John Zabcar, Charles Ahlborn, Paul Cercel, Robert Sorochak, Ed Adamchik, Joe Kuzneski, Francis Novak, Glenn Lehner, Robert Roeder, Peter Billey, William Bodle, John Telesky and Lou Slaby.

=== at Navy (Oyster Bowl) ===
Week 6: Pitt at Navy

Team	1	2	3	4	Total
Pitt	3	0	6	0	9
• Navy	12	0	6	14	32

- Date: October 27, 1962
- Location: Foreman Field
  Norfolk, VA
- Game start: 2:15 p.m.
- Game attendance: 32,000
- Game weather: sunny and cool
- Referee: John H. Coles (Westminster)

Scoring summary
1	PITT	Rick Leeson 37-yard field goal	PITT 3–0
1	NAVY	Jim Stewart 66-yard pass from Roger Staubach (pass failed)	Navy 6–3
1	NAVY	Johnny Sai 3-yard run ( Jim Weston kick failed)	NAVY 12–3
3	NAVY	Orlosky 3-yard run (kick blocked)	NAVY 18–3
3	PITT	Leeson 1-yard run (kick failed)	NAVY 18–9
4	NAVY	Bob Orlosky1-yard run (Weston kick)	NAVY 25–9
4	NAVY	Staubach 22-yard run (Weston kick)	NAVY 32–9

Game 6 on the schedule was against the Naval Academy in the Oyster Bowl held annually in Norfolk, Virginia. This was Navy's seventh appearance (3–3) in the charity game. Normally, the Middies travelled to Norfolk by ship, but with the country in the middle of the Cuban Missile Crisis, they rode busses. Coach Wayne Hardin's Middies were 3–2 and led by sophomore quarterback Roger Staubach. Pitt led the all-time series 7–2–1, and was favored.

Pitt lost to Navy 32–9. Navy opened the game with an onside kick. The Panthers were alert and recovered on their own 47-yard line. The Pitt offense drove the ball to the Navy 21-yard line and stalled. With only 3:11 off the clock, Rick Leeson booted a 37-yard field goal to put the Panthers ahead 3–0. It took Navy 38 seconds to answer. They returned the kick-off to their 34-yard line. On first down Navy end Jim Stewart left the huddle limping toward the sideline. The ball was snapped and Stewart raced down the sideline uncovered and caught a 66-yard touchdown pass from Roger Staubach. The 2-point conversion failed and Navy led 6–3. Pitt received the kick-off and turned the ball over on second down at the Panther 36-yard line. A 7-play drive was capped by a 3-yard run by John Sai. Jim Weston was wide on the extra point, and Navy led 12–3 at halftime. The Middies went 60 yards in 9 plays to open the second half. Robert Orlosky scored on a 3-yard run around right end. Weston's kick was blocked and Navy led 18–3. Pitt's offense made it 18–9 with a 58-yard, 6-play drive capped by a 1-yard plunge by Rick Leeson. Lesson missed the placement. Navy scored 2 more touchdowns in the final quarter: Robert Orlosky scored on a 1-yard run and Roger Staubach scored on a 22-yard run. Jim Weston converted both extra points.

Rick Leeson led the Pitt rushers with 55 yards on 14 carries. Ed Clark gained 42 yards on 8 carries. Navy quarterback Roger Staubach completed 8 of 8 passes for 192 yards and rushed 12 times for 28 yards.

The Pitt starting line-up for the game against Navy was Al Grigaliunas (left end), John Maczuzak (left tackle), Tom Brown (left guard), Martin Schottenheimer (center), Ralph Conrad (right guard), Ernie Borghetti (right tackle), Eugene Sobolewski (right end), Jim Traficant (quarterback), Ed Clark (left halfback), Paul Martha (right halfback) and Rick Leeson (fullback). Substitutes appearing in the game for Pitt were John Jenkins, Robert Long, Joe Gudenburr, William Howley, Joe Kuzneski, Ed Adamchik, Ronald Linaburg, Gary Kaltenbach, Bob Ostrosky, John Price, Robert Sorochak, John Draksler, Charles Ahlborn, Paul Cercel, Glenn Lehner, Fred Mazurek, Francis Novak, William Bodle, John Ozimek, Robert Roeder, Peter Billey, Bernard LaQuinta, John Telesky and Lou Slaby.

=== Syracuse ===
Week 7: Syracuse at Pitt

Team	1	2	3	4	Total
Syracuse	0	0	6	0	6
• Pitt	14	3	0	7	24

- Date: November 3, 1962
- Location: Pitt Stadium
  Pittsburgh, PA
- Game start: 1:30 p.m.
- Game attendance: 23,473
- Game weather: cloudy and cool
- Referee: Barney Finn

Scoring summary
1	PITT	Ernie Borghetti recovered fumble in end zone (Rick Leeson kick)	PITT 7–0
1	PITT	Paul Martha 31-yard run (Leeson kick)	PITT 14–0
2	PITT	Leeson 35-yard field goal	PITT 17–0
3	SYR	Walt Sweeney 1-yard pass from Walley Mahle (run failed)	PITT 17–6
4	PITT	Martha 54-yard pass interception (Leeson kick)	PITT 24–6

Pitt's 1962 Homecoming opponent was the Syracuse Orangemen. Coach Ben Schwartzwalder's squad was 2–3 on the season and favored by 4 points. Pitt led the all-time series 9–6–2, but the Orange had won the past 4 meetings. Coach Michelosen started quarterback Fred Mazurek, who was injured in the Baylor game and saw limited action in their last game versus Navy.

The Panthers beat Syracuse 24–6 before their Homecoming crowd of 23,473. Syracuse received the kick-off, and the Pitt defense forced a punt on fourth down. The center snap went over the punter's head and Pitt tackle Ernie Borghetti fell on the ball in the end zone for 6 points. Rick Leeson kicked the extra point and Pitt led 7–0 after three minutes. After an exchange of punts the Panthers had the ball on the Orange 26-yard line. On fourth down with 15 yards to go, the Panthers ran a double reverse with Paul Martha carrying the ball last, and going 31 yards for the Panthers second touchdown. Leeson again added the point after and Pitt led 14–0 at the end of the first quarter. In the second quarter Pitt drove to the Syracuse 18, and on fourth down Leeson booted a 35-yard field goal to extend the lead to 17–0 at halftime. Late in the third period, Syracuse back John Humphreys intercepted a Jim Traficant pass at the Panther 40-yard line and ran to the 30-yard line. 4 plays moved the ball to the 2-yard line. On fourth down Walley Mahle threw a shovel pass to Walt Sweeney for the touchdown. The two point conversion failed. In the final quarter Paul Martha intercepted a Rich King pass and raced 54 yards for the final touchdown. Leeson kicked the point after.

The Pitt defense held Syracuse to -11 yards rushing, while gaining 175. Conversely, Syracuse gained 150 yards passing to 7 yards for Pitt. Pitt only threw 3 passes. Syracuse fumbled 4 times and Pitt recovered three of them.

The Pitt starting line-up for the game against Syracuse was Al Grigaliunas (left end), John Maczuzak (left tackle), Tom Brown (left guard), Martin Schottenheimer (center), Ralph Conrad (right guard), Ernie Borghetti (right tackle), Eugene Sobolewski (right end), Fred Mazurek (quarterback), Ed Clark (left halfback), Paul Martha (right halfback) and Rick Leeson (fullback). Substitutes appearing in the game for Pitt were John Jenkins, William Howley, Gary Kaltenbach, John Draksler, James Irwin, Paul Cercel, Charles Ahlborn, John Holzbach, Robert Sorochak, John Price, Ed Adamchik, Stephen Sisak, Robert Long, Joe Kuzneski, Sam Colella, Jim Traficant, Glenn Lehner, Robert Roeder, Peter Billey, William Bodle, Bernard LaQuinta, John Telesky and Lou Slaby.

=== at Notre Dame ===
Week 8: Pitt at Notre Dame

Team	1	2	3	4	Total
Pitt	0	14	0	8	22
• Notre Dame	22	7	7	7	43

- Date: November 10, 1962
- Location: Notre Dame Stadium
  Notre Dame, IN
- Game start: 1:30 p.m.
- Game attendance: 52,715
- Game weather: cool
- Referee: Tony Skover

Scoring summary
1	ND	Don Hogan 6-yard run (Ed Rutkowski kick)	ND 7–0
1	ND	Jim Kelly 9-yard pass from Daryle Lamonica (Rutkowski run)	ND 15–0
1	ND	Ron Bliey 12-yard run (Rutkowski kick)	ND 22–0
2	PITT	Jim Traficant 4-yard run (p-ass failed)	ND 22–6
2	ND	Kelly 5-yard pass from Lamonica (Rutkowski kick)	ND 29–6
2	PITT	Ed Clark 56-yard run (Paul Martha run)	ND 29–14
3	ND	Clay Stephens 40-yard pass from Lamonica (Rutkowski kick)	ND 36–14
4	PITT	Kelly 13-yard pass from Lamonica (Rutkowski kick)	ND 43–14
4	PITT	Fred Mazurek 93-yard kick-off return (John Jenkins pass from Ed Clark)	ND 43–22

On November 10, the Panthers traveled to South Bend, Indiana to be the Homecoming opponent for the Notre Dame Fighting Irish. Coach Joe Kuharich's squad was 2–4 for the season and favored by 3 points. Pitt trailed in the all-time series 10–17–1, but had won 3 of the previous 4 games. All-American candidate, quarterback Daryle Lamonica, led the Irish.

Pitt had no answer for Notre Dame's pass offense and lost 43–22 to the delight of the 52,215 Homecoming fans. Daryle Lamonica connected with end Jim Kelly for three touchdowns and with Clay Stephens for another. Lamonica completed 17 of 27 for 243 yards and four touchdowns. Don Hogan (6-yard run) and Ron Bliey (12-yard run) scored the other Irish touchdowns. Ed Rutkowski kicked 5 extra points and also ran for a two-point conversion. In the second quarter, Pitt managed to score on a Jim Traficant 4-yard run, and a 56-yard run by Ed Clark to cut the halftime lead to 29–14. Pitt's final touchdown was a 93-yard kick-off return by Fred Mazurek. The Panthers converted twice on 2-point conversions. First on a Paul Martha run and then on an Ed Clark pass to John Jenkins.

Pitt earned 12 first downs and gained 235 total yards. Ed Clark led the Panthers' rushing with 76 yards on 6 carries, Rick Leeson added 66 yards on 9 carries. Jim Traficant completed 3 of 10 passes. Pitt lost 3 fumbles. Notre Dame had 23 first downs and gained 420 total yards. Irish end Jim Kelly caught 11 passes for 127 yards.

The Pitt starting line-up for the game against Notre Dame was Al Grigaliunas (left end), Gary Kaltenbach(left tackle), Tom Brown (left guard), Paul Cercel (center), John Price (right guard), Ed Adamchik (right tackle), Eugene Sobolewski (right end), Glenn Lehner (quarterback), Peter Billey (left halfback), William Bodle (right halfback) and Rick Leeson (fullback). Substitutes appearing in the game for Pitt were John Jenkins, William Howley, Joe Kuzneski, Robert Long, John Maczuzak, John Draksler, Bernard LaQuinta, Ray Popp, Charles Ahlborn, John Holzbach, James Irwin, Ralph Conrad, Ernie Borghetti, Jim Traficant, Fred Mazurek, Sam Colella, Francis Novak, Ed Clark, Robert Roeder, Paul Martha, John Ozimek, John Telesky and Lou Slaby.

=== at Army ===
Week 9: Pitt at Army

Team	1	2	3	4	Total
• Pitt	0	7	0	0	7
Army	0	0	6	0	6

- Date: November 17, 1962
- Location: Yankee Stadium
  The Bronx, NY
- Game start: 1:30 p.m.
- Game attendance: 23,917
- Game weather: dark and dreary
- Referee: David H. Buchanan (Temple)

Scoring summary
2	PITT	Robert Roeder 4-yard run (Rick Leeson kick)	PITT 7–0
3	ARMY	Joe Blackgrove 4-yard run (run failed)	PITT 7–6

On November 17, the Panthers played a second game on a neutral field. Pitt played Army at Yankee Stadium in New York City. Pitt led the series 5–2–2, but the past two games were ties. First-year Coach Paul Dietzel's Black Knights were 6–2 on the season.

Pitt improved their record to 5–4 by beating the Army 7–6 in front of only 23,917 fans. Pitt's touchdown came in the second quarter. Pitt guard Jim Irwin recovered Army halfback John Seymour's fumble on the Army 15-yard line. On the fifth play, Bob Roeder ran 4 yards around right end for the score. Rick Leeson booted the extra point. The Panthers led 7–0 at halftime. In the third quarter Army gained possession on the Pitt 31-yard line. Army scored in 4 plays with quarterback Joe Blackgrove going the final 3 yards through the left side of the Pitt defense. Pitt guards, Tom Brown and Jim Irwin, tackled Cammy Lewis to stymie the 2-point conversion.

Pitt earned 10 first downs to Army's 6, but the Cadets gained 209 total yards to the Panthers 151. The Pitt defense recovered 4 Army fumbles and intercepted 2 passes.

The Pitt starting line-up for the game against Army was Al Grigaliunas (left end), John Maczuzak (left tackle), Tom Brown (left guard), Paul Cercel (center), Ralph Conrad (right guard), Ernie Borghetti (right tackle), Eugene Sobolewski (right end), Jim Traficant (quarterback), Ed Clark (left halfback), Paul Martha (right halfback) and Rick Leeson (fullback). Substitutes appearing in the game for Pitt were John Jenkins, Gary Kaltenbach, John Draksler, Martin Schottenheimer, Charles Ahlborn, James Irwin, Jeff Ware, Ed Adamchik, Joe Kuzneski, Fred Mazurek, Glenn Lehner, Robert Roeder, Peter Billey, John Ozimek, William Bodle, John Telesky and Lou Slaby.

=== Penn State ===
Week 10: Penn State at Pitt

Team	1	2	3	4	Total
• Penn State	0	3	7	6	16
Pitt	0	0	0	0	0

- Date: November 24, 1962
- Location: Pitt Stadium
  Pittsburgh, PA
- Game start: 1:30 p.m.
- Game attendance: 45,149
- Game weather: clear and cold

Scoring summary
2	PSU	Ron Coates 36-yard field goal	PSU 3–0
3	PSU	Roger Kochman 56-yard pass from Pete Liske (Coates kick)	PSU 10–0
4	PSU	Al Gursky 18-yard pass from Pete Liske (kick failed)	PITT 10–9

Pitt closed their season at home on November 24, in their annual game against Penn State. State Coach Rip Engle's squad was 8–1, and his roster had All-American candidates: end Dave Robinson, tackle Chuck Sieminski, halfback Roger Kochman and quarterback Pete Liske. Pitt still led the all-time series 33–25–3.

Ten squad members played their last game for the Panthers: Gary Kaltenbach, Ralph Conrad, Tom Brown, Jim Traficant, Ed Clark, John Draksler, Lou Slaby, John Holzbach, Sam Colella and John Chisdak.

Pitt lost 16–0 to the bowl-bound Lions in front of their largest home crowd of the season (45,149). Pitt played in Penn State territory most of the first quarter but could not score. Late in the second period State intercepted a Jim Traficant pass and advanced to the Pitt 19-yard line. The Pitt defense held, but Ron Coates booted a 36-yard field goal for a 3–0 State lead at halftime. In the third quarter, State halfback Roger Kochman scored on a 56-yard pass from Pete Liske. Coates kicked the extra point to extend the State lead to 10–0. On the first play of the fourth quarter Pete Liske threw an 18-yard touchdown pass to Al Gursky to close the scoring. Pitt drove to the State 5-yard line as time ran out.

The Pitt starting line-up for the game against Penn State was Al Grigaliunas (left end), John Maczuzak (left tackle), Tom Brown (left guard), Paul Cercel (center), Ralph Conrad (right guard), Ed Adamchik (right tackle), Eugene Sobolewski (right end), Fred Mazurek (quarterback), Peter Billey (left halfback), William Bodle (right halfback) and Rick Leeson (fullback). Substitutes appearing in the game for Pitt were John Jenkins, William Howley, Gary Kaltenbach, John Draksler, Bernard LaQuinta, Martin Schottenheimer, Charles Ahlborn, James Irwin, Robert Sorochak, Ernie Borghetti, Jeff Ware, Joe Kuzneski, Jim Traficant, Ed Clark, Robert Roeder, Paul Martha, John Telesky and Lou Slaby.

== Postseason ==
On December 22, Coach Michelosen co-coached with Murray Warmath at the annual North-South Shrine Game in Miami, FL. Pitt players Ed Clark (halfback), Tom Brown (guard) and Gary Kaltenbach (tackle) were on the roster. On December 29, Pitt guard John Draksler played in the East-West Shrine Game in San Francisco.

Halfback Paul Martha was named first team All-East by both the Associated Press (AP) and United Press International (UPI). Fullback Rick Leeson was named first team All-East by the UPI and second team by the AP. Guard Jim Irwin was named to the AP All-East third team. Tackle Ernie Borghetti was named honorable mention on the AP All-East squad. Martha and Irwin were named honorable mention on the NEA All-American team.

== Coaching staff ==
1962 Pittsburgh Panthers football staff
Coaching staff: John Michelosen – head coach; Frank Lauterbur – tackle coach; Carl DePasqua –defensive backs coach; Walter Cummins – center coach; Steve Petro – guard coach; Lou Cecconi – backfield coach; Ernie Hefferle – end coach; Bill Kaliden – freshman coach; Joe Pullekines – assistant freshman coach	Support staff: Frank Carver– athletic director; J. Clyde Barton – assistant athletic director; Walter Cummins – assistant athletic director; Carroll Cook– athletic publicity director; Dr. W. K. Smith – team doctor; Dr. Chester Phillips – team doctor; Dr.Richard Deitrick – team doctor; Howard Waite – trainer; Roger McGill – trainer; James Hurbanek – student manager

== Roster ==
1962 Pittsburgh Panthers football roster
Player	Position	Games	Weight	Height	Class	Prep School	Hometown
Tom Abele	fullback	0	205	6 ft 2 in	sophomore	Niskatuna H. S.	Schenectady, NY
Ed Adamchik*	tackle	9	230	6 ft 2 in	junior	Johnstown H. S.	Johnstown, PA
Charles Ahlborn*	center	10	205	6 ft 2 in	junior	Rostraver Twp. H. S.	Belle Vernon, PA
Jock Beachler	center	0	185	5 ft 11 in	sophomore	Mt. Lebanon H. S.	Mt. Lebanon, PA
William Beck	halfback	0	185	5 ft 10 in	sophomore	Portage Area H. S.	Portage, PA
Dennis Bernick	tackle	0	215	6 ft	sophomore	McKeesport H. S.	McKeesport, PA
Peter Billey*	halfback	10	170	5 ft 9 in	junior	Hurst H. S.	United, PA
Ed Billy	halfback	0	175	5 ft 11 in	junior	Clairton-Bullis Prep H. S.	Clairton, PA
Tom Black	quarterback	0	180	6 ft 1 in	sophomore	Washington Twp. H. S.	Apollo, PA
William Bodle*	halfback	10	192	6 ft	sophomore	Highland Park H. S.	Deerfield, IL
Ernest Borghetti*	tackle	10	235	6 ft 4 in	junior	Ursuline H. S.	Youngstown, OH
John Botula	end	0	196	6 ft	junior	South Hills H. S.	Pittsburgh, PA
Tom Brown*	guard	10	220	6 ft	senior	Munhall H. S.	Munhall, PA
Paul Cercel*	center	7	220	6 ft 1 in	sophomore	Austintown-Fitch H. S.	Youngstown, OH
Gerald Cherry	tackle	0	225	6 ft	sophomore	West Mifflin H. S.	Munhall, PA
Dennis Chillinsky	halfback	1	190	6 ft	junior	Plum H. S.	Plum Borough, PA
John Chisdak	fullback	0	185	6 ft	senior	Scranton Central H. S.	Scranton, PA
Robert Chisdak	end	0	185	6 ft	sophomore	Scranton Central H. S.	Scranton, PA
Ronald Cimino	guard	0	185	5 ft 11 in	sophomore	Swissvale H. S.	Swissvale, PA
Ed Clark*	halfback	10	170	5 ft 11 in	senior	Indiana H. S.	Indiana, PA
Sam Colella	quarterback	2	178	5 ft 10 in	senior	Baldwin-Kiski H. S.	Baldwin, PA
Ralph Conrad*	guard	10	215	5 ft 11 in	senior	Altoona H. S.	Altoona, PA
Ray Conway	halfback	0	180	6 ft	sophomore	Peabody-Shadyside H. S.	Pittsburgh, PA
John Cullen	guard	0	205	6 ft	sophomore	Munhall H. S.	Munhall, PA
Dick Dobrowolski	tackle	0	215	6 ft	sophomore	Tarentum H. S.	Tarentum, PA
Ronald Dodson	end	0	195	6 ft	sophomore	Altoona H. S.	Altoona, PA
John Draksler*	guard	10	215	6 ft 1 in	senior	United H. S.	Brush Valley, PA
James Eskridge	end	0	195	6 ft 2 in	sophomore	Rootstown H. S.	New Milford, OH
James Ferraco	halfback	0	200	6 ft 3 in	sophomore	Hampton Twp. H. S.	Allison Park, PA
Tom Furjanic	tackle	0	200	6 ft 3 in	sophomore	Bishop-McDevitt H. S.	Steelton, PA
James Gaffney	halfback	0	185	6 ft	sophomore	Allegheny H. S.	Cumberland, MD
Marshall Goldberg, Jr.	halfback	0	193	5 ft 11 in	sophomore	New Trier Twp. H. S.	Glencoe, IL
Al Grigaliunis*	end	10	197	5 ft 11 in	junior	Benedictine H. S.	Cleveland, OH
Joe Gudenburr	end	3	185	6 ft 1 in	sophomore	Carrick H. S.	Pittsburgh, PA
John Holzbach*	center	6	215	6 ft 3 in	senior	South. H. S.	Youngstown, OH
William Howley*	end	9	200	6 ft 2 in	sophomore	Munhall H. S.	Munhall, PA
John Hunter	center	0	208	6 ft 1 in	junior	East H. S.	Youngstown, OH
Bernard Hynde	tackle	0	245	6 ft 3 in	sophomore	Elizabeth-Forward H. S.	Elizabeth, PA
James Irwin*	guard	4	205	5 ft 11 in	sophomore	Taylor-Allderdice H. S.	Pittsburgh, PA
John Jenkins*	end	7	210	6 ft 4 in	junior	Union Area Joint H. S.	New Castle, PA
Gary Kaltenbach*	tackle	9	245	6 ft 2 in	senior	Clairton H. S.	Clairton, PA
Paul Kisiday	center	0	180	6 ft 1 in	sophomore	Ambridge H. S.	Ambridge, PA
Joe Kuzneski*	end	9	190	6 ft 3 in	junior	Indiana Joint H. S.	Indiana, PA
Edward Lally	tackle	0	225	6 ft 2 in	sophomore	Sharpsville H. S.	Sharpsville, PA
Bernard LaQuinta*	fullback	7	225	5 ft 10 in	sophomore	Mt. Lebanon H. S.	Mt. Lebanon, PA
Rick Leeson*	fullback	10	195	6 ft 1 in	junior	Scott Twp. H. S.	Scott Twp., PA
Glen Lehner*	quarterback	9	190	6 ft 1 in	junior	Baldwin H. S.	Baldwin, PA
Ronald Linaburg	tackle	3	210	6 ft 3 in	sophomore	Monongahela H. S.	Monongahela, PA
Marvin Lippincott	halfback	0	195	6 ft	junior	Phillipsburg H. S.	Riegelsville, NJ
Robert Long*	end	8	190	6 ft 3 in	junior	Sharon H.S.	Sharon, PA
John Maczuzak*	tackle	9	220	6 ft 5 in	junior	Ellsworth H.S.	Ellsworth, PA
Ronald Marini	tackle	0	200	6 ft 1 in	sophomore	Wintersville H. S.	Wintersville, OH
Paul Martha*	qb/halfback	10	180	6 ft	junior	Shady Side H. S.	Wilkinsburg, PA
Fred Mazurek*	quarterback	7	185	5 ft 10 in	sophomore	Redstone H. S.	Republic, PA
Jack Mechas	halfback	0	175	6 ft	sophomore	Wilkinsburg H. S.	Pittsburgh, PA
Steve Mizerak	end	0	210	6 ft 3 in	sophomore	Laura Lamar H. S.	Homer City, PA
Francis Novak*	quarterback	7	175	6 ft	sophomore	South Union H. S.	Uniontown, PA
Robert Ostrosky	tackle	5	222	6 ft 1 in	junior	Uniontown H. S.	New Salem, PA
John Ozimek*	halfback	7	185	5 ft 10 in	junior	Burgettstown-Union H. S.	Bulger, PA
Dan Picciano	end	0	185	6 ft 1 in	sophomore	Jeannette H. S.	Jeanette, PA
Ray Popp	guard	2	218	6 ft 1 in	junior	Monongahela H. S.	Monongahela, PA
John Price*	tackle	7	210	5 ft 11 in	sophomore	Elmer L. Myers H. S.	Wilkes-Barre, PA
Paul Pulsinelli	quarterback	0	195	6 ft 2 in	sophomore	McKeesport H. S.	McKeesport, PA
Robert Roeder*	halfback	9	185	5 ft 11 in	junior	Emmaus H. S.	Emmaus, PA
Martin Schottenheimer*	center	9	210	6 ft 3 in	sophomore	Fort Cherry H. S.	McDonald, PA
Ronald Simantel	end	0	210	6 ft 7 in	sophomore	New Kensington H. S.	New Kensington, PA
Stephen Sisak	tackle	1	220	6 ft 2 in	sophomore	Laura Lamar H. S.	Graceton, PA
Lou Slaby*	fullback	8	230	6 ft 3 in	senior	Salem H. S.	Salem, OH
Eugene Sobolewski*	end	10	190	6 ft 2 in	junior	Freeport H. S.	Freeport, PA
Tom Sopkovich	tackle	0	194	6 ft 3 in	sophomore	Canfield H. S.	Canfield, OH
Robert Sorochak*	guard	7	212	5 ft 10 in	sophomore	Kingston H. S.	Kingston, PA
John Telesky*	fullfback	10	201	5 ft 10 in	junior	BloomsburgH. S.	Bloomsburg, PA
Jim Traficant*	quarterback	10	190	6 ft	senior	Cardinal Mooney H. S.	Youngstown, OH
Frank Walton	end	0	210	5 ft 11 in	junior	Beaver Falls H. S.	Beaver Falls, PA
Jeff Ware*	tackle	3	215	6 ft 1 in	junior	Camp Hill H. S.	Camp Hill, PA
Nick Warino	halfback	0	186	5 ft 10 in	sophomore	East H.S.	Youngstown, OH
John Zabkar	guard	2	210	5 ft 11 in	sophomore	Latrobe H. S.	Latrobe, PA
* Letterman

== Individual scoring summary ==
1962 Pittsburgh Panthers scoring summary
Player	Touchdowns	Extra points	Two pointers	Field goals	Safety	Points
Paul Martha	7	0	1	0	0	44
Rick Leeson	2	9	1	3	0	32
Jim Traficant	2	0	0	0	0	12
Ed Clark	2	0	0	0	0	12
William Howley	2	0	0	0	0	12
Fred Mazurek	1	0	0	0	0	6
Robert Roeder	1	0	0	0	0	6
Al Grigaliunas	1	0	0	0	0	6
Ernie Borghetti	1	0	0	0	0	6
John Jenkins	0	0	2	0	0	4
Eugene Sobolewski	0	0	1	0	0	2
Totals	19	9	5	3	0	142

== Statistical leaders ==
Pittsburgh's individual statistical leaders for the 1962 season include those listed below.

=== Rushing ===
Player	Attempts	Net yards	Yards per attempt	Touchdowns
Rick Leeson	104	481	4.6	2
Ed Clark	75	407	5.4	2
Paul Martha	78	351	4.5	4
Fred Mazurek	49	182	3.7	1

=== Passing ===
Player	Attempts	Completions	Interceptions	Comp %	Yards	Yds/Comp	TD
Jim Traficant	88	39	7	44.3	611	15.7	3
Fred Mazurek	13	6	1	46.2	58	9.7	1
PaulMartha	8	2	2	25.0	33	16.5	1
Ed Clark	5	2	1	40.0	33	16.5	0

=== Receiving ===
Player	Receptions	Yards	Yds/Recp	TD
Paul Martha	12	246	20.5	2
Al Grigaliunas	9	128	12.3	1
William Howley	5	108	21.6	2
Rick Leeson	4	74	18.5	0

=== Kickoff returns ===
Player	Returns	Yards	Yds/Return	TD
Ed Clark	9	127	14.1	0
Paul Martha	8	140	17.5	0
Rick Leeson	7	113	16.1	0

=== Punt returns ===
Player	Returns	Yards	Yds/Return	TD
Paul Martha	4	23	5.6	0
Fred Mazurek	3	25	8.3	0
Ed Clark	3	24	8.0	0
Peter Billey	3	21	7.0	0

== Team players drafted into the NFL ==
The following Panthers were chosen by NFL teams during their 1963 draft.

Player	Position	Round	Pick	NFL club
Gary Kaltenbach	tackle	5	59	Minnesota Vikings
Lou Slaby	linebacker	5	69	New York Giants
Ernie Borghetti	tackle	6	72	Cleveland Brownss
John Maczuzak	defensive tackle	9	120	San Francisco 49ers
Ed Adamchik	center	12	166	New York Giants
Jim Traficant	back	20	276	Pittsburgh Steelers

== Team players drafted into the AFL ==
The following Panthers were chosen by AFL teams during their 1963 draft.

Player	Position	Round	Pick	AFL club
Lou Slaby	linebacker	4	29	Denver Broncos
Tom Brown	guard	11	84	Houston Oilers
Ed Adamchik	center	21	164	Buffalo Bills
Ernie Borghetti	tackle	21	168	Kansas City Chiefs
John Maczuzak	defensive tackle	22	176	Kansas City Chiefs
Gary Kaltenbach	tackle	25	198	Houston Oilers
