= 1962 Boston College Eagles football team =

American college football season

1962 Boston College Eagles football
- Conference: Independent
- Record: 8–2
- Head coach: Jim Miller (1st season)
- Captain: Art Graham
- Home stadium: Alumni Stadium

1962 NCAA University Division independents football records
	Conf.			Overall
Team	W	L	T	W		L		T
Memphis State		–		8	–	1	–	0
Oregon State		–		9	–	2	–	0
No. 9 Penn State		–		9	–	2	–	0
West Texas State		–		9	–	2	–	0
Boston College		–		8	–	2	–	0
Utah State		–		8	–	2	–	0
Villanova		–		7	–	3	–	0
Buffalo		–		6	–	3	–	0
Oregon		–		6	–	3	–	1
Houston		–		7	–	4	–	0
Miami (FL)		–		7	–	4	–	0
Army		–		6	–	4	–	0
Holy Cross		–		6	–	4	–	0
Louisville		–		6	–	4	–	0
Xavier		–		6	–	4	–	0
Florida State		–		4	–	3	–	3
Air Force		–		5	–	5	–	0
Montana		–		5	–	5	–	0
Navy		–		5	–	5	–	0
Notre Dame		–		5	–	5	–	0
Pacific (CA)		–		5	–	5	–	0
Pittsburgh		–		5	–	5	–	0
Syracuse		–		5	–	5	–	0
Texas Western		–		4	–	5	–	0
New Mexico State		–		4	–	6	–	0
Colgate		–		3	–	5	–	1
Idaho		–		2	–	6	–	1
San Jose State		–		2	–	8	–	1
Boston University		–		2	–	7	–	0
Dayton		–		2	–	8	–	0
Detroit		–		1	–	8	–	0
Hardin–Simmons		–		1	–	9	–	0
Colorado State		–		0	–	10	–	0
Rankings from AP Poll

The 1962 Boston College Eagles football team represented Boston College as an independent during the 1962 NCAA University Division football season. The team compiled an 8–2 record and outscored opponents by a total of 250 to 123.

In January 1962, Jim Miller was signed to a three-year contract as the team's head coach. Miller had led the Detroit Titans football team to an 18–10 record from 1959 to 1961. The Eagles opened their 1962 season with a 27–0 victory over Miller's old team.

The team's defense gave up only 236.2 yards of total offense per game, a figure that ranks fourth best in school history. The defense also recorded a school record 26 interceptions (45 total turnovers) in only 10 games.

The Eagles' sole losses were to Syracuse (0–12) and Navy (6–26). Navy's sophomore quarterback Roger Staubach threw two touchdown passes against Boston College. In the team's October 27 victory over Houston, the defense set a single-game record by allowing the Cougars to gain only 72 yards of total offense.

The team played its home games at Alumni Stadium in Chestnut Hill, Massachusetts.

== Schedule ==
Date	Opponent	Site	Result	Attendance	Source
September 22	at Detroit	University of Detroit Stadium; Detroit, MI	W 27–0	22,000	
September 29	at Villanova	Villanova Stadium; Villanova, PA	W 28–13	13,000	
October 6	VMI	Alumni Stadium; Chestnut Hill, MA	W 18–0	14,500	
October 13	at Syracuse	Archbold Stadium; Syracuse, NY	L 0–12	31,000	
October 20	Navy	Alumni Stadium; Chestnut Hill, MA	L 6–26	25,200	
October 27	Houston ^{†}	Alumni Stadium; Chestnut Hill, MA	W 14–0	17,500	
November 3	at Vanderbilt	Dudley Field; Nashville, TN	W 27–22	11,000	
November 10	Texas Tech	Alumni Stadium; Chestnut Hill, MA	W 42–13	11,200	
November 17	Boston University	Alumni Stadium; Chestnut Hill, MA (rivalry)	W 41–25	23,200	
December 1	Holy Cross	Alumni Stadium; Chestnut Hill, MA (rivalry)	W 48–12	27,000	
^{†}Homecoming

== Individual statistics and awards ==
Quarterback Jack Concannon completed 97 of 181 passes for 1,450 passing yards, 15 touchdowns, and six interceptions. Concannon's 15 touchdown passes tied for the most among NCAA major college players.

End Art Graham was the team captain and led the team with 823 receiving yards and 42 points scored. His 823 receiving yards set a Boston College, single-season record that stood for Graham also 21 years. Graham also received the Thomas F. Scanlan Memorial Trophy as the senior player outstanding in scholarship, leadership, and athletic ability.

The team's other statistical leaders included fullback Harry Crump with 641 rushing yards and Jim McGowan with seven interceptions and 182 interception return yards. McGowan's 182 return yards remains a Boston College, single-season record. McGowan also set the school's single-game record with 136 interception return yards (on two returns for touchdowns) against Texas Tech on November 10, 1962.

Two Eagles (Harry Crump and Art Graham) were named to the 1962 All-East football team selected based on voting conducted by the Eastern College Athletic Conference. Three Eagles (Crump, Graham, and guard Lou Cioci) were also named to the 1962 All-New England football team; quarterback Jack Concannon and end Dave O'Brien were named to the second team.
