= 1962 Miami Hurricanes football team =

American college football season

1962 Miami Hurricanes football

Gotham Bowl, L 34–36 vs. Nebraska
- Conference: Independent

Ranking
- Coaches: No. 18
- Record: 7–4
- Head coach: Andy Gustafson (15th season)
- Home stadium: Miami Orange Bowl

1962 NCAA University Division independents football records
	Conf.			Overall
Team	W	L	T	W		L		T
Memphis State		–		8	–	1	–	0
Oregon State		–		9	–	2	–	0
No. 9 Penn State		–		9	–	2	–	0
West Texas State		–		9	–	2	–	0
Boston College		–		8	–	2	–	0
Utah State		–		8	–	2	–	0
Villanova		–		7	–	3	–	0
Buffalo		–		6	–	3	–	0
Oregon		–		6	–	3	–	1
Houston		–		7	–	4	–	0
Miami (FL)		–		7	–	4	–	0
Army		–		6	–	4	–	0
Holy Cross		–		6	–	4	–	0
Louisville		–		6	–	4	–	0
Xavier		–		6	–	4	–	0
Florida State		–		4	–	3	–	3
Air Force		–		5	–	5	–	0
Montana		–		5	–	5	–	0
Navy		–		5	–	5	–	0
Notre Dame		–		5	–	5	–	0
Pacific (CA)		–		5	–	5	–	0
Pittsburgh		–		5	–	5	–	0
Syracuse		–		5	–	5	–	0
Texas Western		–		4	–	5	–	0
New Mexico State		–		4	–	6	–	0
Colgate		–		3	–	5	–	1
Idaho		–		2	–	6	–	1
San Jose State		–		2	–	8	–	1
Boston University		–		2	–	7	–	0
Dayton		–		2	–	8	–	0
Detroit		–		1	–	8	–	0
Hardin–Simmons		–		1	–	9	–	0
Colorado State		–		0	–	10	–	0
Rankings from AP Poll

The 1962 Miami Hurricanes football team represented the University of Miami as an independent during the 1962 NCAA University Division football season. Led by 15th-year head coach Andy Gustafson, the Hurricanes played their home games at the Miami Orange Bowl in Miami, Florida. Miami finished the season 7–4. The team's offense scored 189 points while the defense allowed 217 points. The Hurricanes competed in the final Gotham Bowl, held at Yankee Stadium. Just 6,166 people came to the game, in which the Nebraska defeated Miami, 36–34. It was the only college bowl game ever played at the stadium.

== Schedule ==
Date	Opponent	Rank	Site	Result	Attendance	Source
September 15	at Pittsburgh		Pitt Stadium; Pittsburgh, PA	W 23–14	32,756	
September 29	TCU		Miami Orange Bowl; Miami, FL	W 21–20	51,251	
October 5	Florida State	No. 9	Miami Orange Bowl; Miami, FL (rivalry)	W 7–6	43,962	
October 13	at No. 6 LSU		Tiger Stadium; Baton Rouge, LA	L 3–17	67,500	
October 19	Maryland		Miami Orange Bowl; Miami, FL	W 28–24	49,381	
October 27	at Air Force		Falcon Stadium; Colorado Springs, CO	W 21–3	32,787	
November 2	Kentucky		Miami Orange Bowl; Miami, FL	W 25–17	43,614	
November 10	at No. 3 Alabama		Denny Stadium; Tuscaloosa, AL	L 3–36	43,200	
November 23	Northwestern		Miami Orange Bowl; Miami, FL	L 7–29	60,341	
December 1	Florida		Miami Orange Bowl; Miami, FL (rivalry)	W 17–15	62,441	
December 15	vs. Nebraska		Yankee Stadium; Bronx, NY (Gotham Bowl, rivalry)	L 32–34	6,166	
Rankings from AP Poll released prior to the game; Source:

== Roster ==
- QB No. 10 George Mira Jr.

== Team players drafted into the NFL ==
Player	Position	Round	NFL club
Roland Benson	Tackle	5	Los Angeles Rams
Jim Mahoney	Linebacker	8	Minnesota Vikings
Nick Ryder	Running back	10	Detroit Lions
Jim Simon	Guard	15	Detroit Lions
Ben Dentel	Center	15	Chicago Bears
Ben Rizzo	Defensive back	20	Philadelphia Eagles
