= 1962 Memphis State Tigers football team =

American college football season

1962 Memphis State Tigers football
- Conference: Independent
- Record: 8–1
- Head coach: Billy J. Murphy (5th season)
- Captains: Jerry Bell; Wayne Evans
- Home stadium: Crump Stadium

1962 NCAA University Division independents football records
	Conf.			Overall
Team	W	L	T	W		L		T
Memphis State		–		8	–	1	–	0
Oregon State		–		9	–	2	–	0
No. 9 Penn State		–		9	–	2	–	0
West Texas State		–		9	–	2	–	0
Boston College		–		8	–	2	–	0
Utah State		–		8	–	2	–	0
Villanova		–		7	–	3	–	0
Buffalo		–		6	–	3	–	0
Oregon		–		6	–	3	–	1
Houston		–		7	–	4	–	0
Miami (FL)		–		7	–	4	–	0
Army		–		6	–	4	–	0
Holy Cross		–		6	–	4	–	0
Louisville		–		6	–	4	–	0
Xavier		–		6	–	4	–	0
Florida State		–		4	–	3	–	3
Air Force		–		5	–	5	–	0
Montana		–		5	–	5	–	0
Navy		–		5	–	5	–	0
Notre Dame		–		5	–	5	–	0
Pacific (CA)		–		5	–	5	–	0
Pittsburgh		–		5	–	5	–	0
Syracuse		–		5	–	5	–	0
Texas Western		–		4	–	5	–	0
New Mexico State		–		4	–	6	–	0
Colgate		–		3	–	5	–	1
Idaho		–		2	–	6	–	1
San Jose State		–		2	–	8	–	1
Boston University		–		2	–	7	–	0
Dayton		–		2	–	8	–	0
Detroit		–		1	–	8	–	0
Hardin–Simmons		–		1	–	9	–	0
Colorado State		–		0	–	10	–	0
Rankings from AP Poll

The 1962 Memphis State Tigers football team represented Memphis State College (now known as the University of Memphis) as an independent during the 1962 NCAA University Division football season. In its fifth season under head coach Billy J. Murphy, the team compiled an 8–1 record and outscored opponents by a total of 261 to 67. Jerry Bell and Wayne Evans were the team captains. The team played its home games at Crump Stadium in Memphis, Tennessee.

The team's statistical leaders included Russell Vollmer with 555 passing yards, fullback Dave Casinelli with 826 rushing yards and 66 points scored, and John Griffin with 220 receiving yards.

== Schedule ==
Date	Opponent	Site	Result	Attendance	Source
September 15	Tennessee Tech	Crump Stadium; Memphis, TN	W 12–6	10,121	
September 22	No. 6 (UD) Ole Miss	Crump Stadium; Memphis, TN (rivalry)	L 7–21	30,100–30,111	
September 29	at North Texas State	Fouts Field; Denton, TX	W 14–6	6,000	
October 6	Louisville	Crump Stadium; Memphis, TN (rivalry)	W 49–0	14,083	
October 13	No. 2 Southern Miss^{†}	Crump Stadium; Memphis, TN (Black and Blue Bowl)	W 8–6	11,120–11,500	
October 27	at Mississippi State	Scott Field; Starkville, MS	W 28–7	29,000	
November 10	at The Citadel	Johnson Hagood Stadium; Charleston, SC	W 60–13	10,200–10,600	
November 17	Arlington State	Crump Stadium; Memphis, TN	W 50–0	6,682	
November 24	Detroit	Crump Stadium; Memphis, TN	W 33–8	9,022	
^{†}Homecoming; Rankings from AP Poll released prior to the game; Source:
