= 1962 Tangerine Bowl =

American college football game

Miami Redskins	Houston Cougars
(8–1–1)	(6–4)
Mid-American Conference	Independent
21	49
Head coach: John Pont	Head coach: Bill Yeoman
	1	2	3	4	Total
Miami	7	0	7	7	21
Houston	7	28	7	7	49
- Date: December 22, 1962
- Season: 1962
- Stadium: Tangerine Bowl
- Location: Orlando, Florida
- MVP: Billy Roland, Houston
- Attendance: 7,500

The 1962 Tangerine Bowl was an American college football bowl game played on December 22, 1962, at the Tangerine Bowl stadium in Orlando, Florida. The Miami Redskins (based in Oxford, Ohio and now the Miami RedHawks) with a record of 8–1–1 played the Houston Cougars with a record of 6–4. Houston won the game, by a score of 49–21.

Remarkably, despite Lopasky's performance, the title of Tangerine Bowl MVP was awarded to UH quarterback Billy Roland.

When questioned about the magnitude of the upset, Bill Yeoman emphatically declared, "Absolutely! We were well aware that Miami was a superior team."

This game holds a unique historical significance as it marked the inaugural televised appearance for the University of Houston. It was broadcast to regional audiences in the Southwest and Midwest, setting the stage for the Cougars' first national broadcast in 1965, which took place in the iconic Astrodome.

== Background ==
In his 7th (and final) season at Miami, Pont led the Redskins to their first bowl game since 1951. After serving as an assistant coach for eight seasons at Michigan State, Yeoman had been hired to coach Houston in 1962. He led them to their first bowl game since 1952.

== Game summary ==
- Miami – Myers 9-yard touchdown pass from Ernie Kellerman (Jenckskick), 9:08 remaining in the 1st quarter
- Houston – Joe Lopasky 3-yard touchdown run (McMillan kick), 2:14 remaining in the 1st quarter
- Houston – Bobby Brezina 1-yard touchdown run (McMillan kick), 11:40 remaining in the 2nd quarter
- Houston – Bobby Brezina 44-yard touchdown pass from Roland (McMillan kick), 5:51 remaining in the 2nd quarter
- Houston – Joe Lopasky 70 punt yard touchdown return (McMillan kick), 3:58 remaining in the 2nd quarter
- Houston – Bill McMillan 4-yard touchdown pass from Billy Roland (McMillan kick), 0:18 remaining in the 2nd quarter
- Miami – Ernie Kellerman 1-yard touchdown run (Jenckskick), 4:50 remaining in the 3rd quarter
- Houston – Joe Lopasky 4-yard touchdown run (McMillan kick), 1:14 remaining in the 3rd quarter
- Miami – Neumeier 11-yard touchdown run (Jenckskick), 12:14 remaining in the 4th quarter
- Houston – Joe Lopasky 14-yard touchdown pass from Billy Roland (McMillan kick), 6:15 remaining in the 4th quarter

Billy Roland threw 11-of-17 for 199 yards and 3 touchdowns, and Joe Lopasky caught 3 passes for 81 yards while scoring four touchdowns, with Roland being named MVP of the game.

== Aftermath ==
Pont left for Yale after the game ended. Miami (despite winning the MAC in 1965) would not be in a bowl game until 1973. Houston would soon utilize the Veer offense near the end of the decade, particularly in their next bowl game in 1969.

== Statistics ==
Statistics	Houston	Miami
First downs	18	17
Passing yards	206	265
Rushing yards	207	54
Total yards	413	319
Passes intercepted	1	2
Penalties–yards	7–83	7–65
Punts–average	3–41.3	5–38.8
Fumbles lost	0	0
