= 1962 Louisville Cardinals football team =

American college football season

1962 Louisville Cardinals football
- Conference: Independent
- Record: 6–4
- Head coach: Frank Camp (17th season)
- Home stadium: Fairgrounds Stadium

1962 NCAA University Division independents football records
	Conf.			Overall
Team	W	L	T	W		L		T
Memphis State		–		8	–	1	–	0
Oregon State		–		9	–	2	–	0
No. 9 Penn State		–		9	–	2	–	0
West Texas State		–		9	–	2	–	0
Boston College		–		8	–	2	–	0
Utah State		–		8	–	2	–	0
Villanova		–		7	–	3	–	0
Buffalo		–		6	–	3	–	0
Oregon		–		6	–	3	–	1
Houston		–		7	–	4	–	0
Miami (FL)		–		7	–	4	–	0
Army		–		6	–	4	–	0
Holy Cross		–		6	–	4	–	0
Louisville		–		6	–	4	–	0
Xavier		–		6	–	4	–	0
Florida State		–		4	–	3	–	3
Air Force		–		5	–	5	–	0
Montana		–		5	–	5	–	0
Navy		–		5	–	5	–	0
Notre Dame		–		5	–	5	–	0
Pacific (CA)		–		5	–	5	–	0
Pittsburgh		–		5	–	5	–	0
Syracuse		–		5	–	5	–	0
Texas Western		–		4	–	5	–	0
New Mexico State		–		4	–	6	–	0
Colgate		–		3	–	5	–	1
Idaho		–		2	–	6	–	1
San Jose State		–		2	–	8	–	1
Boston University		–		2	–	7	–	0
Dayton		–		2	–	8	–	0
Detroit		–		1	–	8	–	0
Hardin–Simmons		–		1	–	9	–	0
Colorado State		–		0	–	10	–	0
Rankings from AP Poll

The 1962 Louisville Cardinals football team was an American football team that represented the University of Louisville as an independent during the 1962 NCAA University Division football season. In their 17th season under head coach Frank Camp, the Cardinals compiled a 6–4 record and outscored opponents by a total of 174 to 173.

The team's statistical leaders included John Giles with 1,222 passing yards, Lee Calland with 650 rushing yards and 48 points scored, and Don Hockensmith with 408 receiving yards.

== Schedule ==
Date	Opponent	Site	Result	Attendance	Source
September 15	at Wichita	Veterans Field; Wichita, KS	W 21–20	14,600	
September 22	Western Michigan	Fairgrounds Stadium; Louisville, KY	W 27–21	7,982	
September 29	at Marshall	Fairfield Stadium; Huntington, WV	W 18–0	6,700	
October 6	at Memphis State	Crump Stadium; Memphis, TN (rivalry)	L 0–49	14,083	
October 13	at Dayton	Baujan Field; Dayton, OH	W 21–0	11,000	
October 20	at Tulsa	Skelly Field; Tulsa, OK	L 0–58	8,000	
November 3	Xavier	Fairgrounds Stadium; Louisville, KY	L 12–13	7,916	
November 10	Kent State	Fairgrounds Stadium; Louisville, KY	W 29–8	5,000	
November 17	North Texas State	Fairgrounds Stadium; Louisville, KY	W 14–10	5,107	
November 24	Houston	Fairgrounds Stadium; Louisville, KY	L 25–27	4,126	
