= 1962 Bowling Green Falcons football team =

American college football season

1962 Bowling Green Falcons football

MAC champion
- Conference: Mid-American Conference
- Record: 7–1–1 (5–0–1 MAC)
- Head coach: Doyt Perry (8th season)
- Home stadium: University Stadium

1962 Mid-American Conference football standings
	Conf.					Overall
Team	W		L		T	W		L		T
Bowling Green $	5	–	0	–	1	7	–	1	–	1
Ohio	5	–	1	–	0	8	–	3	–	0
Miami (OH)	3	–	1	–	1	8	–	2	–	1
Western Michigan	3	–	3	–	0	5	–	4	–	0
Kent State	2	–	4	–	0	3	–	6	–	0
Toledo	1	–	5	–	0	3	–	6	–	0
Marshall	0	–	5	–	0	4	–	6	–	0
$ – Conference champion

The 1962 Bowling Green Falcons football team was an American football team that represented Bowling Green State University in the Mid-American Conference (MAC) during the 1962 NCAA University Division football season. In their eighth season under head coach Doyt Perry, the Falcons compiled a 7–1–1 record (5–0–1 against MAC opponents), won the MAC championship, and outscored opponents by a combined total of 204 to 91.

The team's statistical leaders included Tony Ruggiero with 393 passing yards, Don Lisbon with 481 rushing yards, and Jay Cunningham with 259 receiving yards.

== Schedule ==
Date	Opponent	Site	Result	Attendance	Source
September 22	Marshall	University Stadium; Bowling Green, OH	W 48–6	10,500	
September 29	at Dayton*	Baujan Field; Dayton, OH	W 14–7	14,350	
October 6	at Western Michigan	Waldo Stadium; Kalamazoo, MI	W 10–6	15,000	
October 13	at Toledo	Glass Bowl; Toledo, OH (rivalry)	W 28–13	13,236	
October 20	Kent State^{†}	University Stadium; Bowling Green, OH (rivalry)	W 45–6	12,262	
October 27	at Miami (OH)	Miami Field; Oxford, OH	T 24–24	14,983	
November 3	at West Texas State*	Buffalo Bowl; Canyon, TX	L 7–23	19,000	
November 10	Ohio	University Stadium; Bowling Green, OH	W 7–6	12,315	
November 17	Southern Illinois*	University Stadium; Bowling Green, OH	W 21–0	8,100–8,125	
*Non-conference game; ^{†}Homecoming; Source:
