= 1962 Buffalo Bulls football team =

American college football season

1962 Buffalo Bulls football
- Conference: Independent
- Record: 6–3
- Head coach: Dick Offenhamer (8th season)
- Captains: Dick Hort; Jim Wolfe
- Home stadium: Rotary Field

1962 NCAA University Division independents football records
	Conf.			Overall
Team	W	L	T	W		L		T
Memphis State		–		8	–	1	–	0
Oregon State		–		9	–	2	–	0
No. 9 Penn State		–		9	–	2	–	0
West Texas State		–		9	–	2	–	0
Boston College		–		8	–	2	–	0
Utah State		–		8	–	2	–	0
Villanova		–		7	–	3	–	0
Buffalo		–		6	–	3	–	0
Oregon		–		6	–	3	–	1
Houston		–		7	–	4	–	0
Miami (FL)		–		7	–	4	–	0
Army		–		6	–	4	–	0
Holy Cross		–		6	–	4	–	0
Louisville		–		6	–	4	–	0
Xavier		–		6	–	4	–	0
Florida State		–		4	–	3	–	3
Air Force		–		5	–	5	–	0
Montana		–		5	–	5	–	0
Navy		–		5	–	5	–	0
Notre Dame		–		5	–	5	–	0
Pacific (CA)		–		5	–	5	–	0
Pittsburgh		–		5	–	5	–	0
Syracuse		–		5	–	5	–	0
Texas Western		–		4	–	5	–	0
New Mexico State		–		4	–	6	–	0
Colgate		–		3	–	5	–	1
Idaho		–		2	–	6	–	1
San Jose State		–		2	–	8	–	1
Boston University		–		2	–	7	–	0
Dayton		–		2	–	8	–	0
Detroit		–		1	–	8	–	0
Hardin–Simmons		–		1	–	9	–	0
Colorado State		–		0	–	10	–	0
Rankings from AP Poll

The 1962 Buffalo Bulls football team represented the University at Buffalo as an independent during the 1962 NCAA University Division football season. Led by eighth-year head coach Dick Offenhamer, the Bulls compiled a record of 6–3. The team's offense scored 159 points while the defense allowed 148 points. Buffalo played home games at Rotary Field in Buffalo, New York.

== Schedule ==
Date	Opponent	Site	Result	Attendance	Source
September 22	at Boston University	Boston University Field; Boston, MA	W 27–23	10,000	
September 29	at Holy Cross	Fitton Field; Worcester, MA	L 6–16	12,000	
October 6	Villanova	Rotary Field; Buffalo, NY	L 6–36	9,685	
October 13	No. 3 Delaware^{†}	Rotary Field; Buffalo, NY	W 20–19	8,500–8,586	
October 20	at Temple	Temple Stadium; Philadelphia, PA	W 16–13	10,500	
October 27	Ohio	Rotary Field; Buffalo, NY	L 6–41	10,915	
November 3	at Bucknell	Memorial Stadium; Lewisburg, PA	W 28–0	4,000	
November 10	at Gettysburg	Memorial Field; Gettysburg, PA	W 44–0	4,100	
November 17	Colgate	Rotary Field; Buffalo, NY	W 6–0	9,280–9,289	
^{†}Homecoming; Rankings from UPI Coaches Poll released prior to the game; Source:
