= 1962 New Mexico State Aggies football team =

American college football season

1962 New Mexico State Aggies football
- Conference: Independent
- Record: 4–6
- Head coach: Warren B. Woodson (5th season)
- Home stadium: Memorial Stadium

1962 NCAA University Division independents football records
	Conf.			Overall
Team	W	L	T	W		L		T
Memphis State		–		8	–	1	–	0
Oregon State		–		9	–	2	–	0
No. 9 Penn State		–		9	–	2	–	0
West Texas State		–		9	–	2	–	0
Boston College		–		8	–	2	–	0
Utah State		–		8	–	2	–	0
Villanova		–		7	–	3	–	0
Buffalo		–		6	–	3	–	0
Oregon		–		6	–	3	–	1
Houston		–		7	–	4	–	0
Miami (FL)		–		7	–	4	–	0
Army		–		6	–	4	–	0
Holy Cross		–		6	–	4	–	0
Louisville		–		6	–	4	–	0
Xavier		–		6	–	4	–	0
Florida State		–		4	–	3	–	3
Air Force		–		5	–	5	–	0
Montana		–		5	–	5	–	0
Navy		–		5	–	5	–	0
Notre Dame		–		5	–	5	–	0
Pacific (CA)		–		5	–	5	–	0
Pittsburgh		–		5	–	5	–	0
Syracuse		–		5	–	5	–	0
Texas Western		–		4	–	5	–	0
New Mexico State		–		4	–	6	–	0
Colgate		–		3	–	5	–	1
Idaho		–		2	–	6	–	1
San Jose State		–		2	–	8	–	1
Boston University		–		2	–	7	–	0
Dayton		–		2	–	8	–	0
Detroit		–		1	–	8	–	0
Hardin–Simmons		–		1	–	9	–	0
Colorado State		–		0	–	10	–	0
Rankings from AP Poll

The 1962 New Mexico State Aggies football team represented New Mexico State University as an independent during the 1962 NCAA University Division football season. In their fifth year under head coach Warren B. Woodson, the Aggies compiled a 4–6 record.

The team's statistical leaders included Armando Alba with 605 passing yards, Preacher Pilot with 1,247 rushing yards, and Lee Sampson and Rhome Nixon, each with 283 receiving yards. For the fourth consecutive year, a New Mexico State back won the NCAA rushing title, Pervis Atkins in 1959, Bob Gaiters in 1960, and Preacher Pilot in 1961 and 1962.

Woodson was later inducted into the College Football Hall of Fame.

== Schedule ==
Date	Opponent	Site	Result	Attendance	Source
September 15	at New Mexico	University Stadium; Albuquerque, NM (rivalry)	L 17–28	28,576	
September 22	Pacific (CA)	Memorial Stadium; Las Cruces, NM	W 28–6		
September 29	at Wisconsin	Camp Randall Stadium; Madison, WI	L 13–69	40,495	
October 5	at Detroit	University of Detroit Stadium; Detroit, MI	W 21–14	12,507	
October 13	at Wichita	Veterans Stadium; Wichita, KS	L 6–24	9,891	
October 20	at West Texas State	Buffalo Bowl; Canyon, TX	L 12–20	19,800	
October 27	North Texas State^{†}	Memorial Stadium; Las Cruces, NM	W 48–12		
November 3	Trinity (TX)	Memorial Stadium; Las Cruces, NM	W 26–20		
November 10	Texas Western	Memorial Stadium; Las Cruces, NM (rivalry)	L 0–21	10,000	
November 17	at Arizona State	Sun Devil Stadium; Tempe, AZ	L 20–45	28,545	
^{†}Homecoming
