= 1962 Houston Cougars football team =

American college football season

1962 Houston Cougars football

Tangerine Bowl champion

Tangerine Bowl, W 49–21 vs. Miami (OH)
- Conference: Independent
- Record: 7–4
- Head coach: Bill Yeoman (1st season)
- Captains: Billy Roland; Bobby Brezina
- Home stadium: Rice Stadium

1962 NCAA University Division independents football records
	Conf.			Overall
Team	W	L	T	W		L		T
Memphis State		–		8	–	1	–	0
Oregon State		–		9	–	2	–	0
No. 9 Penn State		–		9	–	2	–	0
West Texas State		–		9	–	2	–	0
Boston College		–		8	–	2	–	0
Utah State		–		8	–	2	–	0
Villanova		–		7	–	3	–	0
Buffalo		–		6	–	3	–	0
Oregon		–		6	–	3	–	1
Houston		–		7	–	4	–	0
Miami (FL)		–		7	–	4	–	0
Army		–		6	–	4	–	0
Holy Cross		–		6	–	4	–	0
Louisville		–		6	–	4	–	0
Xavier		–		6	–	4	–	0
Florida State		–		4	–	3	–	3
Air Force		–		5	–	5	–	0
Montana		–		5	–	5	–	0
Navy		–		5	–	5	–	0
Notre Dame		–		5	–	5	–	0
Pacific (CA)		–		5	–	5	–	0
Pittsburgh		–		5	–	5	–	0
Syracuse		–		5	–	5	–	0
Texas Western		–		4	–	5	–	0
New Mexico State		–		4	–	6	–	0
Colgate		–		3	–	5	–	1
Idaho		–		2	–	6	–	1
San Jose State		–		2	–	8	–	1
Boston University		–		2	–	7	–	0
Dayton		–		2	–	8	–	0
Detroit		–		1	–	8	–	0
Hardin–Simmons		–		1	–	9	–	0
Colorado State		–		0	–	10	–	0
Rankings from AP Poll

The 1962 Houston Cougars football team was an American football team that represented the University of Houston as an independent during the 1962 NCAA University Division football season. In its first season under head coach Bill Yeoman, the team compiled a 7–4 record and defeated Miami (OH) in the 1962 Tangerine Bowl. Billy Roland and Bobby Brezina were the team captains. The team played its home games at Rice Stadium in Houston.

== Schedule ==
Date	Opponent	Site	Result	Attendance	Source
September 22	Baylor	Rice Stadium; Houston, TX (rivalry)	W 19–0	32,000	
September 29	Texas A&M	Rice Stadium; Houston, TX	W 6–3	51,000	
October 6	at No. 7 Ole Miss	Mississippi Memorial Stadium; Jackson, MS	L 7–40	18,000	
October 13	at No. 1 Alabama	Denny Stadium; Tuscaloosa, AL	L 3–14	30,000	
October 20	Mississippi State	Rice Stadium; Houston, TX	L 3–9	15,000–16,000	
October 27	at Boston College	Alumni Stadium; Chestnut Hill, MA	L 0–14	17,500	
November 3	at Florida State	Doak Campbell Stadium; Tallahassee, FL	W 7–0	20,000	
November 10	Tulsa^{†}	Rice Stadium; Houston, TX	W 35–31	15,000	
November 24	at Louisville	Fairgrounds Stadium; Louisville, KY	W 27–25	4,126	
December 1	Cincinnati	Rice Stadium; Houston, TX	W 42–14	10,000	
December 22	vs. Miami (OH)	Tangerine Bowl; Orlando, FL (Tangerine Bowl)	W 49–21	7,500	
^{†}Homecoming; Rankings from AP Poll released prior to the game
