= Memorial Stadium (Kent State) =

Former stadium at Kent State University

- Memorial Stadium circa 1965
- Interactive map of Memorial Stadium
- Former names: Athletic Field, Memorial Field
- Location: Kent, Ohio, United States
- Coordinates: 41.147905°N 81.343535°W
- Owner: Kent State University
- Operator: Kent State University
- Capacity: 7,000 (1950–1954); 12,000 (1954–1965); 20,000 (1965–1969)
- Surface: natural grass

Construction
- Groundbreaking: 1939 (playing field); 1950 (grandstand)
- Opened: 1941 (playing field); 1950 (grandstand)
- Closed: 1968
- Demolished: 1969

Tenants
- Kent State Golden Flashes (NCAA); Football (1941–1968); Men's track and field (1941–1968)

Memorial Stadium was a multi-purpose stadium in Kent, Ohio, United States, on the campus of Kent State University. Its primary use was as the home field for the Kent State Golden Flashes football team and also served as the home venue for the KSU men's track and field team. The football and track teams had already been playing on the site since 1941, but with temporary bleachers for seating. The permanent grandstand built and dedicated in 1950, which also included a press box, was the first phase of the stadium, and was later followed by a duplicate grandstand on the opposite side of the field in 1954. Initial plans called for the seating to eventually surround the field, though these plans were largely never realized. During the 1960s, additional bleacher seats were added separate from the two main grandstands on all sides of the field, and brought seating capacity to approximately 20,000 by 1965.

Campus developments in the 1960s and the need to keep the stadium on par with other facilities in the Mid-American Conference, however, led university officials to recommend building a new stadium on a different site rather than continue to expand Memorial Stadium. The stadium was displaced to make way for a new 12-story library and student center complex, originally known as the University Center, built in the late 1960s and early 1970s adjacent to the stadium site. The main seating areas of Memorial Stadium were dismantled in early 1969 and reassembled at the site of the new stadium in a different configuration. Today, the site of Memorial Stadium is largely occupied by the visitor parking lot for the Kent Student Center while the original grandstand of Memorial Stadium is still used as the north end zone at Dix Stadium.

== History ==
View of the "new University Athletic Field" dated November 14, 1941, showing the original stands

When Kent State Normal College established its first football team in 1920, the team played at Rockwell Field, which was also shared with the baseball team. Rockwell Field was plagued by poor drainage and sod issues and the school found it difficult to schedule home games because of the poor state of the field. In 1939, construction started on new athletic fields along Summit Street with the hope of eventually building a permanent stadium, a project funded by the Works Progress Administration. The area was on what was then the far southwestern edge of the campus, previously known as the College Farm. It was completed in 1941 and included temporary bleacher seating and a cinder track around the field. Adjacent to the football field and track was a baseball field. The first game at the new field, which was initially just referred to as the Athletic Field, was on September 27, 1941, a 58–0 Kent State win over Bluffton College. After World War II ended, the university saw an increase in male enrollment, so additional facilities were built in the area around what was eventually called Memorial Field. A new physical education building for men, now known as the Memorial Athletic and Convocation Center, was built on the hill overlooking Memorial Stadium and opened in December 1950. The university's first men's dorm, Stopher Hall, had opened in 1948, just north of the eventual site of the new gym.

Aerial of Memorial Stadium in 1950 when it was new. The main grandstand is still in use at Dix Stadium. The Memorial Athletic and Convocation Center can be seen on the left

The drive to build a permanent stadium was organized in 1946, led by a committee made up of students, alumni, faculty, and local residents who raised approximately $60,000 in two years. Long-range plans initially called for permanent seating to form a horseshoe around the field and seating for 30,000 people. The first game held at the new stadium was on October 14, 1950, a 57–0 win over Marietta College. That was also the stadium's dedication game, where it was dedicated to the 113 KSU students who had died during World War II. The main grandstand sat 5,600 people and included a press box. Auxiliary bleacher seating was placed on the opposite side of the field for an initial capacity of approximately 7,000.

In 1954, a second permanent grandstand was built opposite the original one using the same design. This raised the stadium's capacity to approximately 12,000. Additional auxiliary bleachers would be added on either side of the grandstands and in the end zones over the years, finally bringing capacity to 20,000 by 1965. For the 1965 season, the 20,000-seat capacity made the stadium the largest in the Mid-American Conference until the opening of Doyt Perry Stadium at Bowling Green State University the following year.

During their stay at Memorial Stadium, Kent State joined the Mid-American Conference in 1951 and qualified for their first bowl game, the 1954 Refrigerator Bowl. The stadium also hosted the 1968 MAC track and field championships.

=== Replacement ===
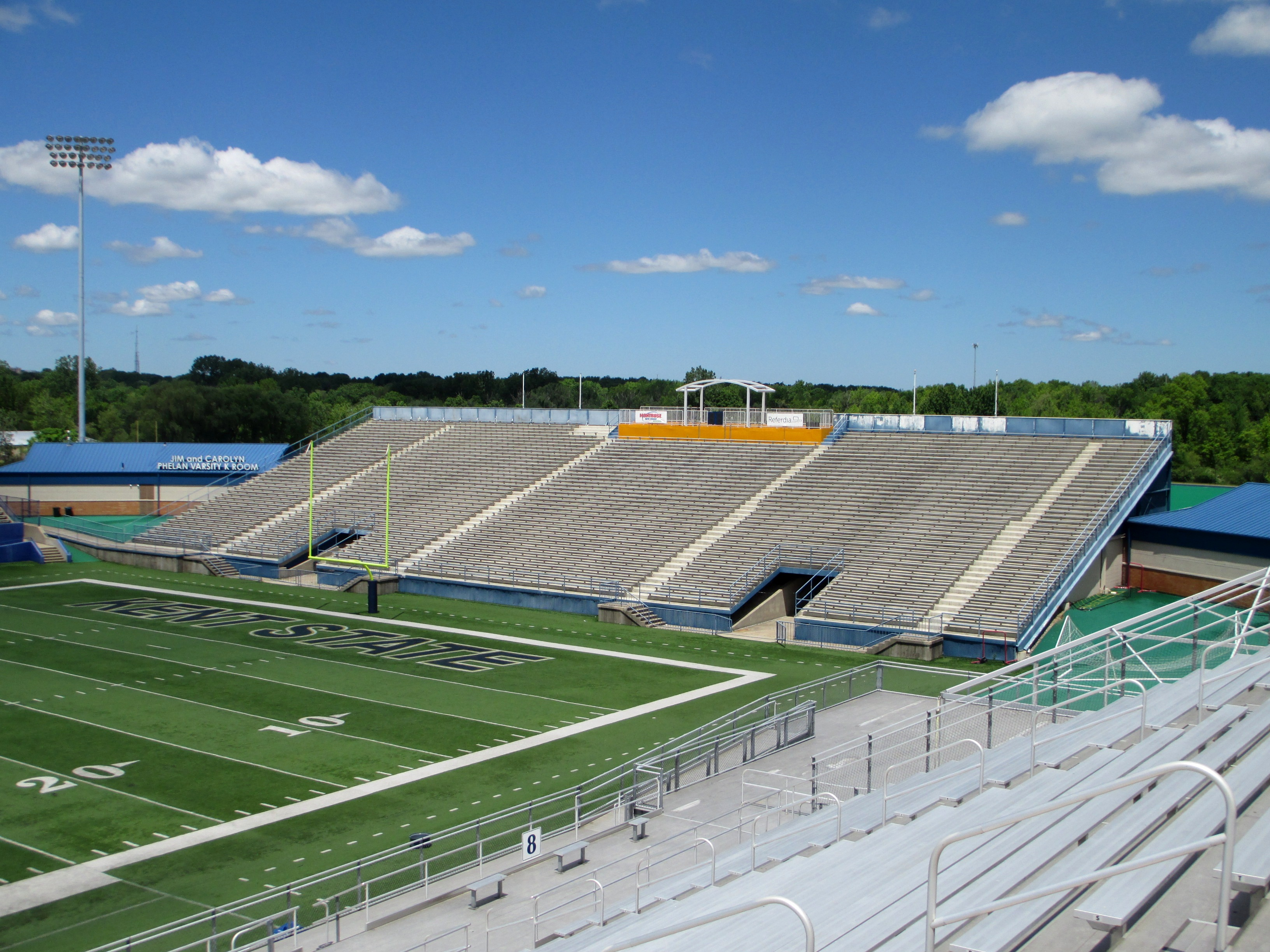
Original grandstand of Memorial Stadium in 2014 at Dix Stadium as the north end zone seats

As early as 1964, there were discussions about building a new stadium as the campus continued to expand in the late 1950s and 1960s. By the mid 1960s, university leaders were planning a new university center that was based around a new library and student center and a row of science buildings. Memorial Stadium would also likely need upgrades to help it keep pace with other facilities in the MAC, so building on a new site was the preferred choice.

Rather than build completely new, though, the new stadium, which was also called Memorial Stadium for its first four seasons, was considered an expansion and relocation of the old stadium as all of Memorial Stadium's main seating areas were dismantled in 1969 and moved to the new site further down Summit Street where they were reassembled in a new configuration. The original south grandstand was moved to be the north end zone seats at the new stadium, while the north grandstand became the south end zone. The auxiliary seating sections that had been adjacent to the grandstands at Memorial Stadium were placed along the east sideline of the new stadium.

== Facilities ==
The field was oriented parallel to Summit Street, running northwest to southeast, and it was surrounded by an eight-lane cinder track. Initially, seating was provided by temporary wooden bleachers on both sidelines, with an elevated area behind the south stand and a small building for storage. Locker rooms were added when the permanent south grandstand was built in 1950 and were located beneath the seating areas with space for storage. Additional storage areas were added under the north grandstand when it was completed in 1954. A one-story press box was included in the stadium construction in 1950. When the north stands were added in 1954, a second level was added to the original press box on the south side with a single-story press area on the new north side. By the mid 1960s, a second story had been added to the north side press area as well.

The field had permanent lighting, added in 1950, with lighting poles located along both sidelines. It was also used for high school football as the home venue for Kent State High School. In the southeast end zone, an electronic scoreboard was added as part of stadium construction in 1950, replacing the previous manual scoreboard.

== Site today ==
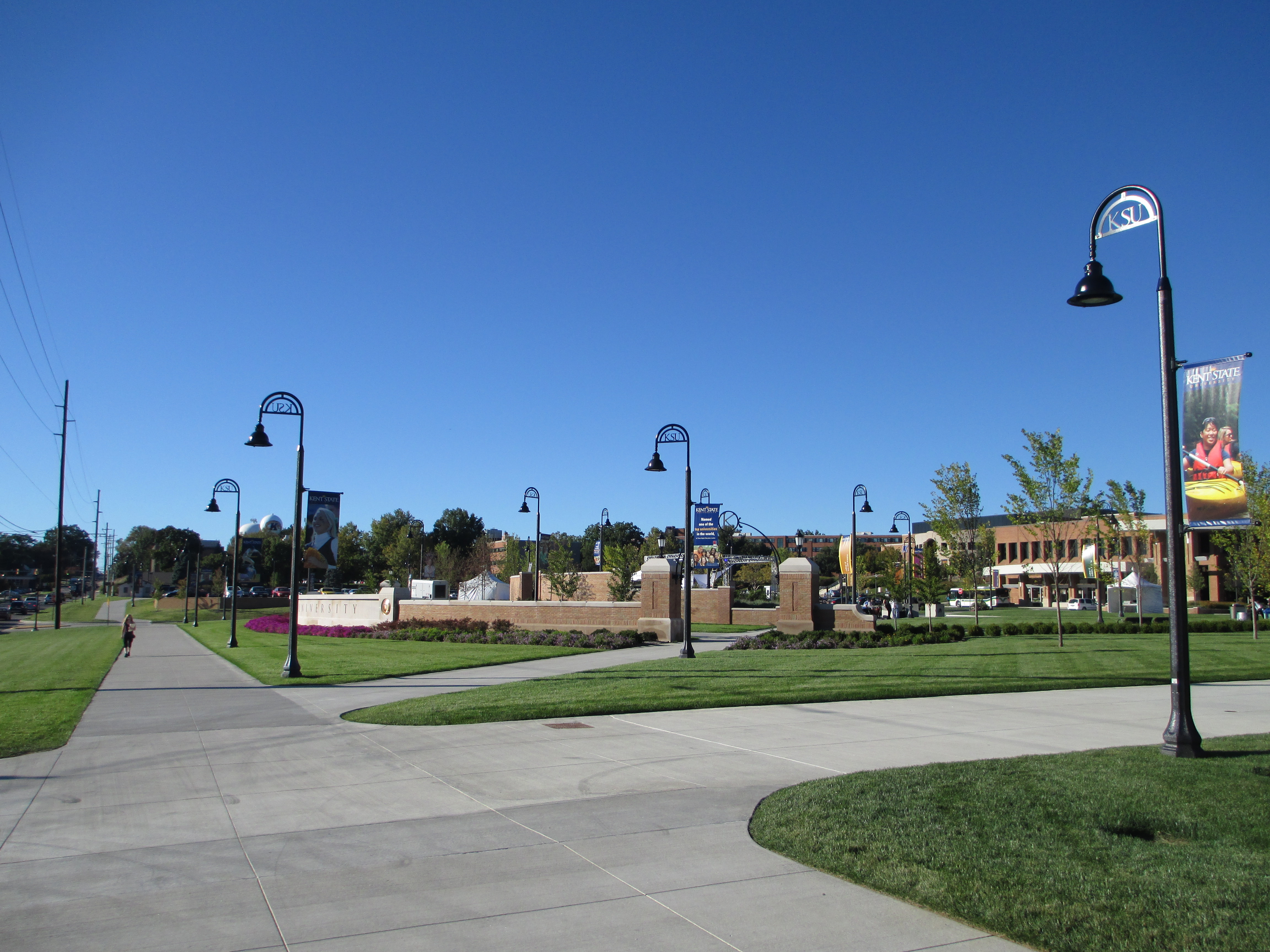
View of the Memorial Stadium site in 2013, which mainly serves as the visitor parking lot in front of the Kent State Student Center, main library, and MAC Center

Construction on the new University Center started in 1967 with the 12-story library, which was completed and dedicated in August 1970. Following the dismantling of the seating areas and demolition of support structures at Memorial Stadium in 1969, the former stadium and field area were used for parking. Construction on the student center and Risman Plaza, located between the student center and library, started in 1969 on the site of what had been a football practice field. The student center was completed and dedicated in January 1973. Most of the Memorial Stadium site was used for an access road to the student center, known as Risman Drive, and a permanent parking lot for visitors to the university. In 2012, as part of an upgrade and expansion of Risman Plaza, the road and parking lot were reconfigured to allow for construction of a grassy area known as the Student Green, which overlaps the former Memorial Stadium end zone area.

Of the pieces of the original stadium, only the north end zone seating area—the original portion of Memorial Stadium—remains in use at Dix Stadium. Prior to the 2007 season the original press box was removed and the entire seating area was repainted. The other parts of Memorial Stadium were removed during the 2000s. The east stands were torn down after the 2001 season and were replaced with a new student section in 2003. In February 2008, the south end zone bleachers were razed as part of Dix Stadium's most recent upgrades to make way for a plaza, new concession area, and new scoreboard.
