= 1962 Big Ten Conference football season =

- Sport: American football
- Teams: 10
- Top draft pick: Ed Budde
- Champion: Wisconsin
- Runners-up: Minnesota
- Season MVP: Ron Vander Kelen

Seasons
- ← 1961 1963 →

1962 Big Ten Conference football standings
	Conf.					Overall
Team	W		L		T	W		L		T
No. 2 Wisconsin $	6	–	1	–	0	8	–	2	–	0
No. 10 Minnesota	5	–	2	–	0	6	–	2	–	1
Northwestern	4	–	2	–	0	7	–	2	–	0
Ohio State	4	–	2	–	0	6	–	3	–	0
Michigan State	3	–	3	–	0	5	–	4	–	0
Purdue	3	–	3	–	0	4	–	4	–	1
Iowa	3	–	3	–	0	4	–	5	–	0
Illinois	2	–	5	–	0	2	–	7	–	0
Indiana	1	–	5	–	0	3	–	6	–	0
Michigan	1	–	6	–	0	2	–	7	–	0
$ – Conference champion; Rankings from AP Poll

The 1962 Big Ten Conference football season was the 67th season of college football played by the member schools of the Big Ten Conference and was a part of the 1962 NCAA University Division football season.

The 1962 Wisconsin Badgers football team, under head coach Milt Bruhn, compiled an 8–2 record, won the Big Ten championship, led the conference in scoring offense (32.2 points per game), and was ranked No. 2 in the final AP Poll. After losing only one game in the regular season, the Badgers lost to USC in the 1963 Rose Bowl. Quarterback Ron Vander Kelen led the Big Ten with 1,582 passing yards and 1,839 total yards and won the Chicago Tribune Silver Football as the conference's most valuable player. End Pat Richter led the conference with 694 receiving yards and was a consensus first-team All-American.

The 1962 Minnesota Golden Gophers football team, under head coach Murray Warmath, compiled a 6–2–1 record, led the conference in scoring defense (6.8 points allowed per game), finished in second place in the Big Ten, and was ranked No. 10 in the final AP Poll. Tackle Bobby Bell was a consensus first-team All-American, won the Outland Trophy as college football's best interior lineman, and finished third in the voting for the 1962 Heisman Trophy.

The 1962 Northwestern Wildcats football team, under head coach Ara Parseghian, compiled a 7–2 record and finished in third place in the conference. The Wildcats were ranked No. 1 in the AP Poll before losing consecutive games late in the season. They remained ranked No. 16 in the final Coaches' Poll. Quarterback Tom Myers totaled 1,537 passing yards, and center Jack Cvercko was a consensus first-team All-American.

The conference's other statistical leaders included Michigan State fullback George Saimes with 642 rushing yards and Wisconsin's Lou Holland with 72 points scored.

== Season overview ==
=== Results and team statistics ===
Conf. Rank	Team	Head coach	AP final	AP high	Overall record	Conf. record	PPG	PAG	MVP
1	Wisconsin	Milt Bruhn	#2	#2	8–2	6–1	**32.2**	13.0	**Ron Vander Kelen**
2	Minnesota	Murray Warmath	#10	#5	6–2–1	5–2	14.6	**6.8**	Bobby Bell
3 (tie)	Northwestern	Ara Parseghian	NR	#1	7–2	4–2	26.3	17.6	George Thomas
3 (tie)	Ohio State	Woody Hayes	NR	#1	6–3	4–2	22.8	10.9	Bill Armstrong
5 (tie)	Michigan State	Duffy Daugherty	NR	#4	5–4	3–3	21.0	10.7	George Saimes
5 (tie)	Purdue	Jack Mollenkopf	NR	#7	4–4–1	3–3	15.7	7.6	Roy Walker
5 (tie)	Iowa	Jerry Burns	NR	NR	4–5	3–3	14.1	18.4	Larry Ferguson
8	Illinois	Pete Elliott	NR	NR	2–7	2–5	8.3	26.0	Ken Zimmerman
9	Indiana	Phil Dickens	NR	NR	3–6	1–5	14.0	15.6	Woody Moore
10	Michigan	Bump Elliott	NR	NR	2–7	1–6	7.8	23.8	Dave Raimey

Key
AP final = Team's rank in the final AP Poll of the 1962 season
AP high = Team's highest rank in the AP Poll throughout the 1962 season
PPG = Average of points scored per game
PAG = Average of points allowed per game
MVP = Most valuable player as voted by players on each team as part of the voting process to determine the winner of the Chicago Tribune Silver Football trophy; trophy winner in bold

=== Preseason ===
There were no changes in the conference's head football coaches between the 1961 and 1962 seasons.

=== Bowl games ===
On January 1, 1963, USC (ranked No. 1) defeated Wisconsin (ranked No. 2), 42–37, at the Rose Bowl in Pasadena, California. This was the first No. 1 versus No. 2 match-up to occur in a bowl game. Ron Vander Kelen, the Wisconsin quarterback and Pete Beathard, the USC quarterback, were both named the Rose Bowl Player of the Game. Down 42–14 in the fourth quarter, Vander Kelen put together a number of drives to score 23 unanswered points and put the Badgers in position to win the game.

=== Post-season developments ===
There were no changes in the conference's head football coaches between the 1962 and 1963 seasons.

== Statistical leaders ==
The Big Ten's individual statistical leaders for the 1962 season include the following:

=== Passing yards ===
Rank	Name	Team	Yards
1	Ron Vander Kelen	Wisconsin	1,582
2	Tom Myers	Northwestern	1,537
3	Mike Taliaferro	Illinois	1,139
4	Duane Blaska	Minnesota	862
5	Woody Moore	Indiana	770

=== Rushing yards ===
Rank	Name	Team	Yards
1	George Saimes	Michigan State	642
2	David Francis	Ohio State	624
3	Sherman Lewis	Michigan State	590
4	Larry Ferguson	Iowa	547
5	Marv Woodson	Indiana	540

=== Receiving yards ===
Rank	Name	Team	Yards
1	Pat Richter	Wisconsin	694
2	Paul Flatley	Northwestern	626
3	Thurman Walker	Illinois	240
4	Jim Warren	Illinois	230
5	Harvey Chapman	Michigan	223

=== Total yards ===
Rank	Name	Team	Yards
1	Ron Vander Kelen	Wisconsin	1,839
2	Tom Myers	Northwestern	1,435
3	Mike Taliaferro	Illinois	1,265
4	Duane Blaska	Minnesota	965
5	Woody Moore	Indiana	756

=== Scoring ===
Rank	Name	Team	Points
1	Lou Holland	Wisconsin	72
2	Sherman Lewis	Michigan State	54
2	Steve Murphy	Northwestern	54
2	George Saimes	Michigan State	54
5	Ron Smith	Wisconsin	42
5	David Francis	Ohio State	42

== Awards and honors ==
=== All-Big Ten honors ===
The following players were picked by the Associated Press (AP) and/or the United Press International (UPI) as first-team players on the 1962 All-Big Ten Conference football team.

Position	Name	Team	Selectors
Quarterback	Ron Vander Kelen	Wisconsin	AP, UPI
Halfback	George Saimes	Michigan State	AP, UPI [fullback]
Halfback	Paul Warfield	Ohio State	AP, UPI
Back	Marvin Woodson	Indiana	AP
Halfback	Larry Ferguson	Iowa	UPI
End	Pat Richter	Wisconsin	AP, UPI
End	John Campbell	Minnesota	AP, UPI
Tackle	Bobby Bell	Minnesota	AP, UPI
Tackle	Don Brumm	Purdue	AP, UPI
Guard	Jack Cvercko	Northwestern	AP, UPI
Guard	Julian Hook	Minnesota	AP, UPI
Center	Dave Behrman	Michigan State	AP
Center	Bill Armstrong	Ohio State	UPI

=== All-American honors ===
At the end of the 1962 season, Big Ten players secured four of the 11 consensus first-team picks for the 1962 College Football All-America Team. The Big Ten's consensus All-Americans were:

Position	Name	Team	Selectors
Tackle	Bobby Bell	Minnesota	AFCA, AP, FWAA, NEA, TSN, UPI, Time, WCFF
End	Pat Richter	Wisconsin	AFCA, AP, FWAA, TSN, UPI, Time, WCFF
Fullback	George Saimes	Michigan State	AFCA, AP, FWAA, TSN, UPI, WCFF
Guard	Andy Cvercko	Northwestern	TSN, UPI, Time, WCFF

Other Big Ten players who were named first-team All-Americans by at least one selector were:

Position	Name	Team	Selectors
Tackle	Don Brumm	Purdue	AP, FWAA
Guard	Ed Budde	Michigan State	Time

=== Other awards ===
Bobby Bell of Minnesota won the Outland Trophy as the best interior lineman in college football. He also finished third in the voting of the Heisman Trophy.

== 1963 NFL draft ==
The following Big Ten players were among the first 100 picks in the 1963 NFL draft:

Name	Position	Team	Round	Overall pick
Ed Budde	Offensive tackle	Michigan State	1	4
Bob Vogel	Offensive tackle	Ohio State	1	5
Pat Richter	End	Wisconsin	1	7
Dave Behrman	Center	Michigan State	1	11
Daryl Sanders	Offensive Tackle	Ohio State	1	12
Don Brumm	Defensive end	Purdue	1	13
Bobby Bell	Tackle	Minnesota	2	16
Lonnie Sanders	Cornerback	Michigan State	2	22
Jim Kanicki	Tackle	Michigan State	2	23
Paul Flatley	End	Northwestern	4	44
Bill Munsey	Back	Minnesota	4	51
Jack Cverko	Guard	Northwestern	5	63
Gary Moeller	Guard	Ohio State	5	66
George Saimes	Safety	Michigan State	6	71
Tom Bloom	Back	Purdue	6	74
John Johnson	Tackle	Indiana	6	80
Bill Zorn	Tackle	Michigan State	7	85
Dave Francis	Back	Ohio State	7	91
Gary Kroner	Back	Wisconsin	7	93
Burt Petkus	Guard	Northwestern	7	97
