= 1963 Rose Bowl =

American college football game

- 49th Rose Bowl Game; National Championship Game
Wisconsin Badgers	USC Trojans
(8–1)	(10–0)
37	42
Head coach: Milt Bruhn	Head coach: John McKay
AP / Coaches; 2 / 2	AP / Coaches; 1 / 1
	1	2	3	4	Total
Wisconsin	7	0	7	23	37
USC	7	14	14	7	42
- Date: January 1, 1963
- Season: 1962
- Stadium: Rose Bowl
- Location: Pasadena, California
- MVP: Pete Beathard (USC QB); Ron Vander Kelen (UW QB)
- Favorite: Wisconsin by 2 points
- National anthem: University of Wisconsin Marching Band
- Referee: James Cain (AAWU) (split crew: AAWU, Big Ten)
- Halftime show: Spirit of Troy, University of Wisconsin Marching Band
- Attendance: 98,698

United States TV coverage
- Network: NBC
- Announcers: Mel Allen, Bill Symes
- Nielsen ratings: 32.8

The 1963 Rose Bowl was the 49th edition of the college football bowl game, played at the Rose Bowl in Pasadena, California on Tuesday, January 1, at the end of the 1962 season. The top-ranked USC Trojans defeated the Wisconsin Badgers, 42–37. The Associated Press and United Press International both awarding the national championship to USC in early December 1962, a month before the game was played (the UPI's national championship trophy was presented to USC on the day before the game was played). Nevertheless, the game was a de facto national championship game as both teams were competing for the Football Writers Association of America's (FWAA) Grantland Rice Trophy, and remained historic as the first matchup between the AP or UPI No. 1 vs. No. 2 in a bowl game, although such matchups had occurred previously in the regular season (sometimes referred to as a "Game of the Century"). The FWAA awarded USC with the ninth annual Grantland Rice Trophy after their victory.

The quarterbacks, Ron Vander Kelen of Wisconsin and Pete Beathard of USC, were named co-Players of the Game.

Down 42–14 in the fourth quarter, Vander Kelen put together a number of drives to score 23 unanswered points and put the Badgers in position to win the game. Due to the historic #1 versus #2 bowl match-up, the number of Rose Bowl records set, and the furious fourth quarter rally by Wisconsin, this game frequently appears on lists of "greatest bowl games of all time."

== Teams ==
This was the first bowl game to pair the #1 and #2 teams in the AP Poll, although there had previously been six regular season #1 versus #2 games since the inception of the poll in 1936. This was the second Rose Bowl meeting between USC and Wisconsin (the first being the 1953 Rose Bowl) and the fourth meeting, overall.

=== Wisconsin Badgers ===
Wisconsin finished the regular season 8–1, becoming the sole champion of the Big Ten Conference. The Badgers were undefeated except for a loss to conference rival Ohio State at Ohio Stadium, ranked #5 in the AP poll at the time. Notable victories were over then-#1 Northwestern during homecoming (37–6) and a comeback victory over archrival Minnesota, then ranked #5 (14–9). The Badgers earned their third trip to the Rose Bowl.

=== USC Trojans ===
After consecutive losing seasons in 1960 and 1961, John McKay turned the Trojans around in his third season as head coach. The team opened with a defeat of #8 Duke. Consecutive wins against SMU, at Iowa, California, and at Illinois got the Trojans ranked higher in the top 10. USC's biggest game of the season was against ninth-ranked Washington; in the homecoming game on November 3, the Trojans blanked the Huskies 14–0. With that win, the Trojans were ranked number two behind Northwestern. On November 17, by beating Navy and with Alabama losing to Georgia Tech 7–6, USC ascended to the number one spot in the AP poll.

In the rivalry game against UCLA, the Bruins led 3–0 until the fourth quarter, when the Trojans scored two touchdowns. In the final game for Notre Dame head coach Joe Kuharich, USC shut out the 5–4 Fighting Irish at the Coliseum, breaking a five-game losing streak in the annual intersectional rivalry. The Trojans finished ranked number 1 for the first time in the history of the AP poll, and were undefeated for the first time since the twice-tied 1939 team won the Rose Bowl.

== Game summary ==
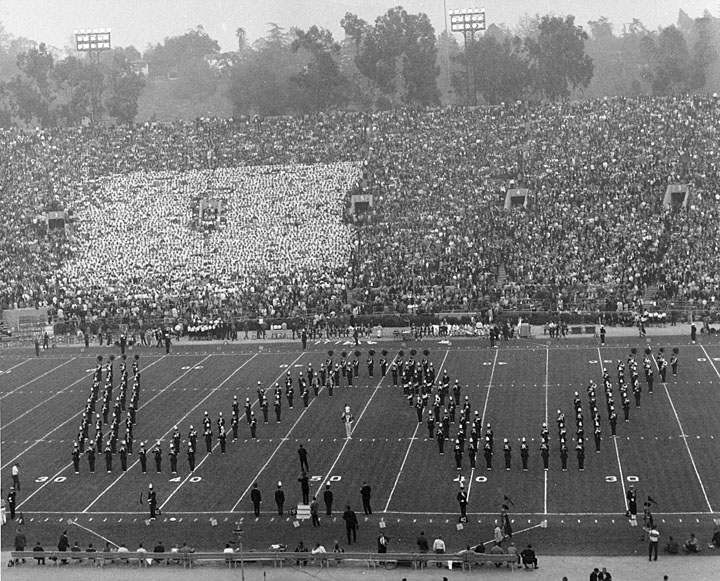
UW Marching Band during the pregame festivities

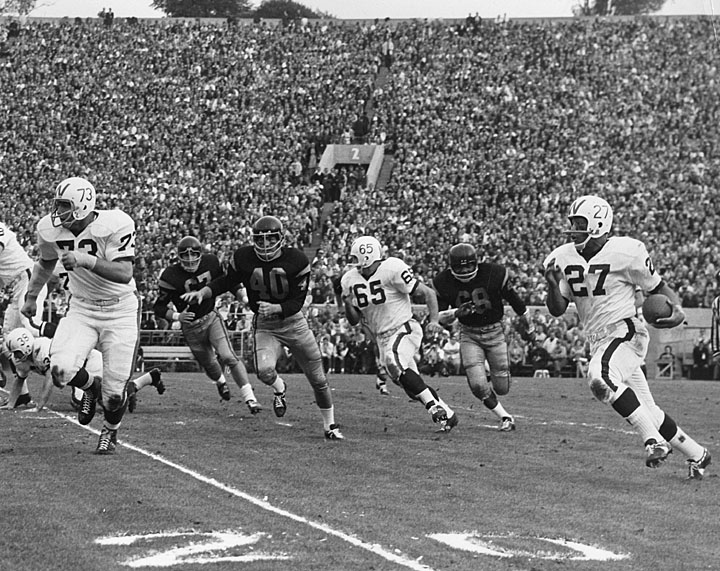
Lou Holland of the Badgers running around the end

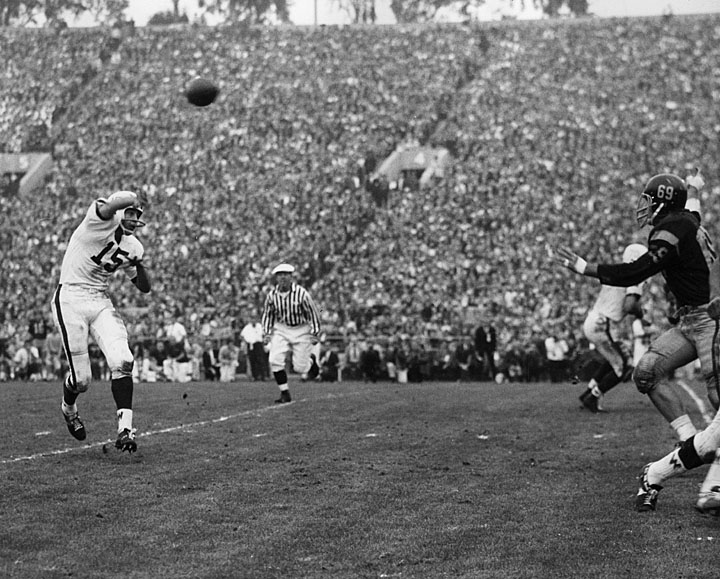
Badgers' Ron Vander Kelen passing ball

USC tackle Marv Marinovich was ejected when he got caught elbowing Steve Underwood, the Wisconsin captain. Pete Beathard completed his fourth touchdown pass with 14:54 left in the game to put USC up 42–14.

Then the Badgers, led by Vander Kelen, put together one of the greatest comebacks in the history of college football, scoring 23 unanswered points in the fourth quarter before time ran out. The final score of the game was USC-42, Wisconsin-37. For their efforts, quarterbacks Beathard and Vander Kelen were both named the Rose Bowl MVPs.

== Scoring ==
=== First quarter ===
- USC touchdown Pete Beathard 13-yard pass to Ron Butcher (Lupo kick)
- Wisconsin Touchdown 1-yard run by Ralph Kurek fullback (Kroner kick)

=== Second quarter ===
- USC touchdown Ben Wilson 1-yard run (Lupo kick)
- USC touchdown Ron Heller 25-yard run (Lupo kick)

=== Third quarter ===
- USC touchdown Beathard pass to Hal Bedsole (57 yards) (Lupo kick)
- Wisconsin touchdown VanderKelen 17-yard run (Kroner Kick)
- USC 23-yard touchdown pass by Pete Beathard to Hal Bedsole (Lupo kick)

=== Fourth quarter ===
- USC 13-yard touchdown pass by Pete Beathard to Fred Hill (Lupo kick)
- Wisconsin touchdown Lou Holland (13-yard run) (Kroner kick)
- Wisconsin touchdown Gary Kroner (4-yard reception) (Kroner kick)
- Wisconsin safety A bad snap on USC punt resulted in a UW safety.
- Wisconsin touchdown VanderKelen 19-yard pass to Pat Richter for the final 42–37 score (Kroner kick)

== Rose Bowl records set ==
Statistic	Total, Team	Status
First downs	32, Wisconsin	current
Passes attempted	48, Wisconsin	broken in 1995
Passes intercepted	3, Wisconsin	tied in 1984 – current
Passes completed	33, Wisconsin	broken in 1995
Passing yards	401, Wisconsin	broken in 1995
Most Plays	??, Wisconsin	broken in 1995
Total Offense	??, Wisconsin	broken in 1995
Combined points	79, Wisconsin & USC	broken in 1991
touchdown passes	4, USC	tied in 1984, 2005 – current
Combined touchdown passes	6, Wisconsin & USC	???
Penalties	12 for 93 yards, USC	???

== Aftermath ==
Eleven Rose Bowl records were set and four still stand as of 2008: most intercepted passes (3 by Ron Vander Kelen), most first downs by one team (32 by Wisconsin), and most penalties (USC 12 for 93 yards). The Rose Bowl record 79 total points scored in this game stood for nearly thirty years (subsequently broken in 1991, when Washington led by 25 and put in reserves early). The omitted records stood for more than thirty years, until broken by Oregon quarterback Danny O'Neil in 1995.

The 1964 Cotton Bowl Classic was the next #1 versus #2 bowl game, while the second #1 versus #2 Rose Bowl came in 1969.

Both of the consensus All-America ends played in this game. Pat Richter (Wisconsin) and Hal Bedsole (USC) were inducted into the College Football Hall of Fame, in 1996 and 2012, respectively. This was Richter's last college game, while Bedsole was an underclassman.

Three players from this game (Beathard, Vander Kelen, and Richter) have been inducted into the Rose Bowl Hall of Fame. John McKay has also been inducted as a coach.

The game is considered by many to be among the greatest games in college football history, along with the 2006 Rose Bowl, among others.

USC's next Rose Bowl was four years later, the first of four consecutive; Wisconsin did not return for 31 years.

== Bibliography ==
- University of Southern California football media guide. (PDF copy available at www.usctrojans.com)
- University of Wisconsin football media guide. (PDF copy available at www.uwbadgers.com)
- Stiegman, Pat – 1963: The greatest Rose Bowl ever. Milwaukee Journal Sentinel, December 23, 1993
- Crowns, Crystal – A Rose Bowl for the ages, Wisconsin’s last shot at a national title Archived 2008-05-08 at the Wayback Machine. The Daily Cardinal, September 27, 2007
- Mishler, Todd (2004). Great Moments in Wisconsin Sports. Big Earth Publishing. ISBN 1-931599-45-9.
- Murray, Jim – A Close Second. Los Angeles Times, January 2, 1963. Reprinted as "One Flinging Badger Made Trojans Sweat", January 4, 2006
- Kopriva, Don (1998). On Wisconsin!: The History of Badger Athletics from 1896-1998. Jim Mott. Sports Publishing LLC. ISBN 1-57167-038-6.
