= 1962 Michigan Wolverines football team =

American college football season

1962 Michigan Wolverines football
- Conference: Big Ten Conference
- Record: 2–7 (1–6 Big Ten)
- Head coach: Bump Elliott (4th season)
- MVP: Dave Raimey
- Captain: Bob Brown
- Home stadium: Michigan Stadium

1962 Big Ten Conference football standings
	Conf.					Overall
Team	W		L		T	W		L		T
No. 2 Wisconsin $	6	–	1	–	0	8	–	2	–	0
No. 10 Minnesota	5	–	2	–	0	6	–	2	–	1
Northwestern	4	–	2	–	0	7	–	2	–	0
Ohio State	4	–	2	–	0	6	–	3	–	0
Michigan State	3	–	3	–	0	5	–	4	–	0
Purdue	3	–	3	–	0	4	–	4	–	1
Iowa	3	–	3	–	0	4	–	5	–	0
Illinois	2	–	5	–	0	2	–	7	–	0
Indiana	1	–	5	–	0	3	–	6	–	0
Michigan	1	–	6	–	0	2	–	7	–	0
$ – Conference champion; Rankings from AP Poll

The 1962 Michigan Wolverines football team was an American football team that represented the University of Michigan in the 1962 Big Ten Conference football season. In its fourth year under head coach Bump Elliott, Michigan compiled a 2–7 record (1–6 against conference opponents), finished in last place in the Big Ten, and were outscored by opponents by a combined total of 214 to 70.

The highlight of the season was a 17–7 victory over No. 10 Army, as Michigan took advantage of five Army turnovers (four interceptions and a fumble) in the second game of the season. Lowlights included (i) fewest points scored (70) since the 1937 team tallied 54, (ii) the worst record for a Michigan team since the 1936 team went 1–7, and (iii) three consecutive shutouts on offense, for the first time since 1935.

Senior end Bob Brown was the team captain, and senior halfback Dave Raimey was selected for the team's most valuable player award. The team's statistical leaders included junior quarterback Bob Chandler with 401 passing yards, Raimey with 385 rushing yards, and junior halfback Harvey Chapman with 223 receiving yards.

== Schedule ==
Date	Opponent	Site	Result	Attendance	Source
September 29	Nebraska*	Michigan Stadium; Ann Arbor, MI	L 13–25	70,287	
October 6	No. 10 Army*	Michigan Stadium; Ann Arbor, MI	W 17–7	70,749	
October 13	at Michigan State	Spartan Stadium; East Lansing, MI (rivalry)	L 0–28	77,501	
October 20	at Purdue	Ross–Ade Stadium; West Lafayette, IN	L 0–37	48,907	
October 27	Minnesota^{†}	Michigan Stadium; Ann Arbor, MI (Little Brown Jug)	L 0–17	65,484	
November 3	Wisconsin	Michigan Stadium; Ann Arbor, MI	L 12–34	53,789	
November 10	Illinois	Michigan Stadium; Ann Arbor, MI (rivalry)	W 14–10	49,756	
November 17	at Iowa	Iowa Stadium; Iowa City, IA	L 14–28	52,880	
November 24	at Ohio State	Ohio Stadium; Columbus, OH (rivalry)	L 0–28	82,349	
*Non-conference game; ^{†}Homecoming; Rankings from AP Poll released prior to the game

== Game summaries ==
=== Nebraska ===
Nebraska at Michigan

Team	1	2	3	4	Total
• Nebraska	0	7	12	6	25
Michigan	0	6	0	7	13

- Date: September 29
- Location: Ann Arbor, MI
- Game attendance: 70,287

Scoring summary
2	NEB	Stuewe 11-yard run (Basssico kick)	NEB 7–0
2	MICH	Dave Glinka 8-yard run (pass failed)	NEB 7–6
3	NEB	Thornton 1-yard run (kick missed)	NEB 13–6
3	NEB	Claridge 5-yard run (pass failed)	NEB 19–6
4	MICH	Dick Rindfuss 4-yard run (Bob Timberlake kick)	NEB 19–13
4	NEB	Thornton 16-yard run (run failed)	NEB 25–13

On September 29, Michigan opened its 1962 season with a 25–13 loss to Nebraska before a crowd of 70,287 at Michigan Stadium in Ann Arbor, Michigan. It was Bob Devaney's second game as head coach at Nebraska. It was also Michigan's first non-conference loss since 1959.

Neither team scored in the first quarter, as Bill Dodd of Michigan missed a field goal from the 10-yard line and then failed to convert on fourth down and a yard from the Nebraska 33-yard line. Nebraska took a 7–0 lead in the second quarter on a 70-yard drive ending in an 11-yard touchdown run by Stuewe. Michigan responded with a 61-yard touchdown drive with Dave Glinka scoring on an eight-yard run on fourth down. Michigan went ffor a two-point conversion, but Glinka's pass was incomplete. Nebraska led, 7–6, at halftime.

On the first drive of the second half, Michigan gained only one yard and was forced to punt. After the punt, Nebraska drove 81 yards and scored on a two-yard run by Bill "Thunder" Thornton (kick blocked by Jim Conley). After a fumble by Dave Raimey, the Cornhuskers drove 28 yard, scoring on a five-yard touchdown run by quarterback Dennis Claridge (pass for two-point conversion failed). In the fourth quarter, Michigan narrowed Nebraska's lead to six points on a 65-yard drive ending with a four-yard touchdown run by Dick Rindfuss (extra point by Bob Timberlake). Nebraska responded with a 75-yard drive ending with a 16-yard touchdown run by Thornton (two-point conversion failed).

Dennis Claridge led Nebraska with 131 rushing yards.

Michigan used four quarterbacks (Dave Glinka, Bob Chandler, Frosty Evashevski, and Bob Timberlake) who combined to completed eight passes.

Statistics	NU	UM
First downs	17	13
Plays–yards	64–341	64–254
Rushes–yards	26–103	31–122
Passing yards	119	84
Passing: comp–att–int	8–15–0	8–27–1
Time of possession		

Team	Category	Player	Statistics
Nebraska	Passing	Claridge	6/12, 89 yards
Nebraska	Rushing	Stuewe	3 carries, 60 yards
Nebraska	Receiving	Huge	3 receptions, 61 yards
Michigan	Passing	Dave Glinka	3/8, 30 yards
Michigan	Rushing	Dave Raimey	17 carries, 59 yards
Michigan	Receiving	Chapman	2 receptions, 26 yards

=== Army ===
Week 2: Army at Michigan

Team	1	2	3	4	Total
Army	0	0	0	7	7
• Michigan	7	3	7	0	17

- Date: October 6
- Location: Ann Arbor, MI
- Game attendance: 70,749

Scoring summary
1	MICH	Jack Strobel 1-yard run (Bob Timerlake kick)	MICH 7–0
2	MICH	Timberlake 25-yard field goal	MICH 10–0
3	MICH	Dave Raimey 7-yard run (Timberlake kick)	MICH 17–0
4	ARMY	Carl Stichweh 73-yard punt return (Heydt kick)	MICH 17–7

On October 6, Michigan defeated No. 10 Army by a 17–7 before a crowd of 70,749 at Michigan Stadium. The Wolverines intercepted four Army passes and gave up only four Army completions. Jack Strobel scored Michigan's first touchdown on a one-yard run in the first quarter. Dave Raimey scored the Wolverines' second touchdown in the third quarter. Bob Timberlake added a 25-yard field goal and two extra points. Carl Stichweh scored for Army on 73-yard punt return in the fourth quarter. Michigan totaled 276 rushing yards in the game while holding Army to 92 rushing yards.

=== Michigan State ===
Week 3: Michigan at Michigan State

Team	1	2	3	4	Total
Michigan	0	0	0	0	0
• Michigan State	13	0	8	7	28

- Date: October 13
- Location: East Lansing, MI
- Game attendance: 77,501

Scoring summary
1	MSU	Lewis 7-yard pass from Smith (Lattimer kick)	MSU 7–0
1	MSU	Sanders 18-yard pass from Migyanka (kick failed)	MSU 13–0
3	MSU	Lewis 3-yard run (Lewis, pass from Smith)	MICH 21–0
4	MSU	Lewis 5-yard run (Lattimer kick)	MICH 28–0

On October 13, Michigan lost to Michigan State, 28–0, before a crowd of 77,501 at Spartan Stadium in East Lansing, Michigan. It was the Spartans' fourth consecutive victory over the Wolverines. Sherman Lewis scored three touchdowns and a two-point conversion, but the Spartans' point tally might have been far greater had they not turned the ball over seven times (five fumbles and two interceptions). The Spartans tallied 459 yards of total offense while allowing only 112 yards by the Wolverines.

=== Purdue ===
Week 4: Michigan at Purdue

Team	1	2	3	4	Total
Michigan	0	0	0	0	0
• Purdue	16	7	7	7	37

- Date: October 20
- Location: West Lafayette, IN
- Game attendance: 48,907

Scoring summary
1	PUR	Tommy Fugate 54-yard pass from Ron Digravio (run failed)	PUR 6–0
1	PUR	Charley King 14-yard pass from DiGravio (Omer Ohl kick)	PUR 13–0
1	PUR	Ohl 23-yard field goal	PUR 16–0
2	PUR	Tom Bloom 58-yard pass from DiGravio (Ohl kick)	PUR 23–0
3	PUR	DiGravio 1-yard run (Ohl kick)	PUR 30–0
4	PUR	Tom Boris 19-yard pass from Gary Hogan (Ohl kick)	PUR 37–0

On October 20, Michigan lost to Purdue, 37–0, at Ross–Ade Stadium in West Lafayette, Indiana. It was the worst defeat suffered by a Michigan football team in 27 years, since losing, 40–0, to Minnesota in 1935. Purdue tallied 200 rushing yards and 212 passing yards. Michigan tallied only 43 rushing yards and 54 passing yards.

=== Minnesota ===
Week 5: Minnesota at Michigan

Team	1	2	3	4	Total
• Minnesota	0	10	7	0	17
Michigan	0	0	0	0	0

- Date: October 27
- Location: Ann Arbor, MI
- Game attendance: 65,484

Scoring summary
2	MINN	Versich 24-yard field goal	MINN 3–0
2	MINN	Campbell 4-yard pass from Blaska (Versich kick)	MINN 10–0
3	MINN	Cairns 58-yard pass from Blaska (Versich kick)	MICH 17–0

On October 27, Michigan lost to Minnesota, 17–0, before a homecoming crowd of 65,484 in Ann Arbor. It was the third consecutive game in which the Wolverines were shut out by a Big Ten opponent. It was the first time the program had been shut out in three consecutive games since 1935. The Wolverines gained only 50 yards (96 passing yards and negative 46 rushing yards) on 66 plays against Minnesota.

=== Wisconsin ===
Week 6: Wisconsin at Michigan

Team	1	2	3	4	Total
• Wisconsin	7	7	0	20	34
Michigan	12	0	0	0	12

- Date: November 3
- Location: Ann Arbor, MI
- Game attendance: 53,789

Scoring summary
1	MICH	Raimey 2-yard run (Bill Dodd kick failed)	MICH 6–0
1	WIS	Vanderkelen 1-yard run (Kromer kick)	WIS 7–6
1	MICH	Raimey 2-yard run (pass failed)	MICH 12–7
2	WIS	Kurek 1-yard run (Kromer kick)	WIS 14–12
4	WIS	Holland 9-yard run (Kromer kick)	WIS 21–12
4	WIS	Kurek 2-yard run (Kromer kick)	WIS 28–12
4	WIS	R. Smith 1-yard run (kick failed)	WIS 34–12

On November 3, Michigan lost to Wisconsin, 34–12, before a crowd of 53,789 at Michigan Stadium in Ann Arbor. After the Wolverines had been shut out for 13 straight quarters, Michigan's Dave Raimey scored two touchdowns in the first quarter. The Wolverines led, 13–7, at the end of the first quarter, but the Wolverines were outscored, 27–0, in the remainder of the game. Wisconsin quarterback Ron Vander Kelen, who was selected as the 1962 Chicago Tribune Silver Football winner, completed 17 of 25 passes for 202 yards and rushed for 59 yards. Pat Richter caught seven passes for 104 yards. Michigan gained only nine yards in the second half.

=== Illinois ===
Week 7: Illinois at Michigan

Team	1	2	3	4	Total
Illinois	0	10	0	0	10
• Michigan	0	0	6	8	14

- Date: November 10
- Location: Ann Arbor, MI
- Game attendance: 49,756

Scoring summary
2	ILL	Jim Plankenhorn 30-yard field goal	ILL 3–0
2	ILL	Mike Summers 1-yard run (Plankenhorn kick)	ILL 10–0
3	MICH	Bob Timberlake 4-yard pass from Bob Chandler (run failed)	ILL 10–6
4	MICH	Chandler 1-yard run (Harvey Chapman pass from Chandler)	MICH 14–10

On November 10, Michigan defeated Illinois by a 14–10 before a crowd of 49,756 at Michigan Stadium. The Illini scored 10 points in the second quarter to take a 10–0 lead at halftime. Michigan converted only three first downs in the first half. In the third quarter, Dave Raimey led the Wolverines down the field on a drive capped by a four-yard touchdown pass from Bob Chandler to Bob Timberlake. Michigan attempted a two-point conversion but Chandler was tackled while trying to pass. On the next Illinois drive, Michigan end Ben Farabee intercepted an Illinois pass and returned it to the one-yard line. Chandler ran one yard for the go-ahead touchdown. The Wolverines completed the scoring with a two-point conversion on a pass from Chandler to Harvey Champman. Illinois' final two drives also ended in turnovers: a Tom Keating interception and a Jim Green fumble recovery.

=== Iowa ===
Week 8: Michigan at Iowa

Team	1	2	3	4	Total
Michigan	6	8	0	0	14
• Ohio State	0	14	0	14	28

- Date: November 17
- Location: Iowa City, IA
- Game attendance: 52,880

Scoring summary
1	MICH	Dave Raimey 1-yard run (kick failed)	MICH 6–0
2	IOWA	Larry Ferguson 16-yard run (Roberts kick)	IOWA 7–6
2	MICH	Raimey 2-yard run (Bob Timberlake pass from Bob Chandler)	MICH 14–7
2	IOWA	Paul Krause 82-yard punt return (Roberts kick)	TIE 14–14
4	IOWA	Sammie Harris 47-yard pass from Matt Szykowny (Roberts kick)	IOWA 21–14
4	IOWA	Dick Turici 4-yard pass from Wallace (Roberts kick)	IOWA 28–14

On November 17, Michigan lost, 28–14, to Iowa before a crowd of 52,880 at Iowa Stadium in Iowa City, Iowa. It was the first time a Michigan team lost at Iowa Stadium.

Michigan led, 14–7 in the second quarter on two short touchdown runs by Dave Raimey. With a minute and a half remaining in the first half, Paul Krause returned a punt 82 yards for a touchdown.

The score remained tied at 14–14 with three minutes remaining in the game. At the 2:51 mark, Iowa quarterback Matt Szykowny connected with Sammie Harris for a 47-yard touchdown pass to put Iowa ahead. On the first play of the ensuing drive, Michigan quarterback Bob Chandler threw a pass that was intercepted by Earl McQuiston at Michigan's 25-yard line and returned to the 13. Iowa scored four plays later on a pass from Bob Wallace to Dick Turici with 45 seconds remaining.

Iowa out-gained Michigan by 278 rushing yards to 153. Iowa's Larry Ferguson led the way 153 yards on 20 carries. Iowa's defense intercepted three Michigan passes.

=== Ohio State ===
Week 9: Michigan at Ohio State

Team	1	2	3	4	Total
Michigan	0	0	0	0	0
• Ohio State	7	0	7	14	28

- Date: November 24
- Location: Columbus, OH
- Game attendance: 82,349

Scoring summary
1	OSU	Francis 1-yard run (Mamula kick)	OSU 7–0
3	OSU	Francis 3-yard run (Mamula kick)	OSU 14–0
4	MICH	Butts 1-yard run (Mamula kick)	OSU 21–0
4	MICH	Ketterhenrich 16yard run (Mamula kick)	OSU 28–0

On November 24, Michigan lost, 28–0, to Ohio State on national television and before a crowd of 82,349 at Ohio Stadium in Columbus, Ohio. Ohio State coach Woody Hayes ran his traditional "three yards and a cloud of dust" offense, as the Buckeyes racked up 330 rushing yards and only seven passing yards. The mainstay of the Buckeyes' offense was senior fullback Dave Francis, who carried the ball 30 times for 186 yards and two touchdowns. Michigan's offense was held to 74 rushing yards and 68 passing yards. Joe Falls in the Detroit Free Press described Ohio State's offense as "awfully dull . . . but awfully deadly", "tromping on people for years – with pure, simple, bone-shattering, teeth-jarring power."

The Wolverines concluded the season with a 2–7 record, the worst for a Michigan team since the 1936 team went 1–7.

== Statistical leaders ==
Michigan's individual statistical leaders for the 1962 season include those listed below.

=== Rushing ===
Player	Attempts	Net yards	Yards per attempt	Touchdowns
Dave Raimey	124	385	3.1	5
Wayne Sparkman	35	133	3.8	0
Bob Timberlake	74	108	1.5	0

=== Passing ===
Player	Attempts	Completions	Interceptions	Comp %	Yards	Yds/Comp	TD	Long
Bob Chandler	64	29	4	45.3	401	13.8	1	17
Bob Timberlake	34	16	3	47.1	179	11.2	0	13
Forest Evashevski, Jr.	35	11	3	31.4	83	7.5	0	17

=== Receiving ===
Player	Receptions	Yards	Yds/Recp	TD	Long
Harvey Chapman	11	225	20.4	0	32
Bob Timberlake	10	160	16.0	1	50
Ron Kocan	5	49	9.8	0	11

=== Kickoff returns ===
Player	Returns	Yards	Yds/Return	TD	Long
Dave Raimey	10	170	17.0	0	25
Jack Strobel	8	138	17.3	0	27
Harvey Chapman	5	112	22.4	0	

=== Punt returns ===
Player	Returns	Yards	Yds/Return	TD	Long
Harvey Chapman	4	24	6.0	0	12
Dave Raimey	8	22	2.8		
Tom Prichard	5	17	3.4	0	

== Personnel ==
=== Letter winners ===
The following players won varsity letters for their participation on the 1962 football team. Players who started at least four games are shown with their names in bold.

- Mel Anthony, 5'11", 195 pounds, sophomore, Cincinnati - fullback
- Donald Blanchard, 6'3", 233 pounds, junior, Sturgis, MI
- **Bob Brown**, 6'5", 226 pounds, senior, Kalamazoo, MI – started 6 games at left end
- Robert Chandler, 6'3", 199 pounds, junior, LaGrange, IL – started 2 games at quarterback
- **Harvey Chapman**, 5'11", 180 pounds, junior, Farmington Hills, MI – started 3 games at right halfback, 1 game at left halfback
- Jim Conley, 6'3", 193 pounds, sophomore, Springdale, PA – started 3 games at left end
- **Bill Dodd**, 5'11", 203 pounds, junior, Virden, IL – started 4 games at fullback
- Forest Evashevski Jr., 6'0", 182 pounds, junior, Iowa City, IA - quarterback
- Ben Farabee, 6'2", 201 pounds, sophomore, Holland, MI - end
- Dave Glinka, 6'0", 194 pounds, senior, Toledo, OH – started 1 game at quarterback
- Jim Green, 6'1", 212 pounds, sophomore, Trenton, MI – started 3 games at center
- Richard Hahn, 6'0", 195 pounds, sophomore, Norton Village, OH - guard
- Edward Hood, 5'9", 175 pounds, senior, Detroit - halfback
- Dennis Jones, 6'2", 191 pounds, sophomore, Worthington, OH - halfback
- **Tom Keating**, 6'3", 206 pounds, junior, Chicago – started 8 games at left tackle
- Ron Kocan, 5'11", 203 pounds, senior Sharpsville, PA – started 3 games at right end
- David Kovacevich, 5'10", 203 pounds, junior, Chicago - guard
- John Kowalik, 5'10", 181 pounds, senior, Detroit - halfback
- **Dave Kurtz**, 6'0", 204 pounds, junior, Toledo, OH – started 8 games at right guard
- **Bill Laskey**, 6'1", 206 pounds, sophomore, Milan, MI – started 5 games at right end
- Gerald Mader, 6'3", 217 pounds, sophomore, Chicago - tackle
- John Marcum, 6'0", 205 pounds, junior, Monroe, MI – started 1 game at right guard
- **John Minko**, 6'1", 226 pounds, senior, Connellsville, PA – started 9 games at left guard
- **William Muir**, 6'0", 200 pounds, junior, Cuyahoga Falls, OH – started 4 games at center
- **Joe O'Donnell**, 6'2", 219 pounds, senior, Milan, MI – started 9 games at right tackle
- Lou Pavloff, 6'0", 210 pounds, senior, Hazel Park, MI – started 1 game at center
- Tom Prichard, 5'10", 180 pounds, junior, Marion, OH – started 3 games at left halfback
- **Dave Raimey**, 5'10", 195 pounds, senior, Dayton, OH – started 4 games at right halfback
- Dick Rindfuss, 6'1", 188 pounds, sophomore, Niles, OH – started 2 games at right halfback
- Richard Schram, 6'1", 220 pounds, senior, Jackson, MI - tackle
- Arnie Simkus, 6'4", 225 pounds, sophomore, Detroit - tackle
- **Wayne Sparkman**, 5'11", 189 pounds, junior, Plymouth, MI – started 5 games at fullback
- Jack Strobel, 5'9", 175 pounds, junior, Maywood, IL – started 3 games at left halfback
- Dick Szymanski, 5'10", 187 pounds, senior, Toledo, OH – started 1 game at center
- **Bob Timberlake**, 6'4", 200 pounds, sophomore, Franklin, OH – started 6 games at quarterback, 2 games at left halfback
- Jim Ward, 6'1", 196 pounds, senior, Imlay City, MI – started 1 game at right end
- Paul Woodward, 6'2", 221 pounds, junior, Cincinnati - tackle
- John Yanz, 6'2", 201 pounds, junior, Chicago - end

=== Non-letter winners ===
- John Houtman, 6'4", 229 pounds, senior, Adrian, MI – started 1 game at left tackle

=== Freshmen ===
- Tom Cecchini, 6'0", 195 pounds, freshman, Detroit - center
- Jack Clancy, 6'1", 190 pounds, freshman, Detroit - quarterback
- Jeffrey Hoyne, 6'1", 195 pounds, freshman, Chicago - end
- Bill Keating, 6'1", 220 pounds, freshman, Chicago - tackle
- Tom Mack, 6'3", 220 pounds, freshman, Buyrus, OH - end
- John Rowser, 6'0", 175 pounds, freshman, Detroit - halfback
- Stephen C. Smith, 6'5" 230 pounds, freshman, Park Ridge, IL - end
- Dick Sygar, 5'11", 176 pounds, freshman, Niles, OH - halfback
- Bill Yearby, 6'3", 220 pounds, freshman, Detroit - tackle

=== Coaching staff ===
- Head coach: Bump Elliott
- Assistant coaches:

- Don Dufek, Sr. - freshmen coach
- Henry Fonde - backfield coach
- Jack Fouts - interior line coach
- Bob Hollway - line coach
- Jack Nelson - ends coach

- Trainer: Jim Hunt
- Manager: Anthony Klain

== Awards and honors ==
- Captain: Bob Brown
- Most Valuable Player: Dave Raimey
- Meyer Morton Award: John Minko
- John Maulbetsch Award: Bob Timberlake

== See also ==
- 1962 in Michigan
