= Pete Beathard =

American football player (born 1942)

No. 10, 11, 12
- Position: Quarterback

Personal information
- Born: March 7, 1942 (age 84); Hermosa Beach, California, U.S.
- Listed height: 6 ft 1 in (1.85 m)
- Listed weight: 200 lb (91 kg)

Career information
- High school: El Segundo (El Segundo, California)
- College: USC
- NFL draft: 1964: 1st round, 5th overall pick
- AFL draft: 1964: 1st round, 2nd overall pick

Career history
- Kansas City Chiefs (1964–1967); Houston Oilers (1967–1969); St. Louis Cardinals (1970–1971); Los Angeles Rams (1972); Kansas City Chiefs (1973); Portland Storm (1974); Chicago Winds (1975); Oakland Raiders (1975)

Awards and highlights
- AFL champion (1966); National champion (1962); First-team All-PCC (1961); Second-team All-PCC (1962)

Career NFL/AFL statistics
- Passing attempts: 1,282
- Passing completions: 575
- Completion percentage: 44.9%
- TD–INT: 43–84
- Passing yards: 8,176
- Passer rating: 49.9
- Rushing yards: 680
- Rushing touchdowns: 11
- Stats at Pro Football Reference

Peter Falconer Beathard (/ˈbɛθərd/ BETH-ərd; born March 7, 1942) is an American former professional football player who was a quarterback in the American Football League (AFL), National Football League (NFL), and World Football League (WFL). He is the younger brother of former NFL executive Bobby Beathard and is Detroit Lions quarterback C. J. Beathard’s great-uncle.

== College career ==
Born and raised in southern California, Beathard graduated from El Segundo High School in 1960 and played college football in Los Angeles at USC.

As a junior, he led the Trojans to the national championship in 1962. Both he and Ron Vander Kelen, the Wisconsin quarterback were named the Players Of The Game in the 1963 Rose Bowl, which USC won, 42–37.

== Professional career ==
Beathard was the fifth overall selection in 1964 NFL draft (Detroit Lions) and the second overall pick in the AFL draft by the Kansas City Chiefs, where he signed and backed up Len Dawson.

On October 30, 1966, Beathard set an NFL record for the most passing yards in a game with a perfect completion percentage, until it was surpassed in 2024 by Jared Goff with 292 yards on 18-for-18 passing in a 42–29 win over the Seattle Seahawks. In that game against the Houston Oilers, Beathard threw for 141 yards, completing all five of his pass attempts.

In October 1967, Beathard was traded during his fourth season to the Houston Oilers in exchange for defensive tackle Ernie Ladd and quarterback Jacky Lee. He led the Oilers to the Eastern division title, but lost 40–7 to the Oakland Raiders in the AFL championship game. Beathard's playing time in 1968 was curtailed due to appendicitis, and in 1969 he took the Oilers to the four-team AFL playoffs.

Beathard was traded to the Cardinals in 1970, the Rams in August 1972, and returned to the Chiefs in 1973.

In March 1974, he was selected by the Houston Texans in the first round (10th overall) of the WFL Pro Draft. He was waived by the Chiefs in September 1974, he finished his pro career in the short-lived World Football League (WFL), with the Portland Storm in 1974, and the Chicago Winds in 1975. He was briefly on the roster of the Oakland Raiders in October 1975.

== See also ==
- List of American Football League players
