= Jerry Burns =

American football player and coach (1927–2021)

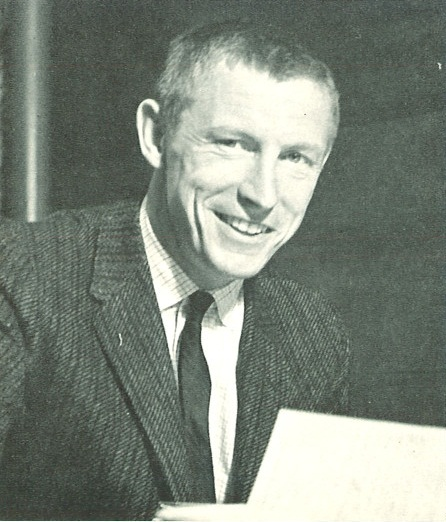
- Burns from 1962 Hawkeye

Profile
- Position: Quarterback

Personal information
- Born: January 24, 1927; Detroit, Michigan, U.S.
- Died: May 12, 2021 (aged 94); Eden Prairie, Minnesota, U.S.

Career information
- College: Michigan (1947–1950)

Career history
- Hawaii (1951) Assistant; Hawaii (1952) Baseball coach; Whittier (1952) Assistant; Whittier (1952–1953) Basketball coach; St. Mary's of Redford HS (MI) (1953) Head coach; Iowa (1954–1965); Assistant coach (1954–1960); Head coach (1961–1965); Green Bay Packers (1966–1967) Assistant coach; Minnesota Vikings (1968–1991); Offensive coordinator (1968–1985); Head coach (1986–1991)

Awards and highlights
- 2× Super Bowl champion (I, II); NFL champion (1969); Minnesota Vikings Ring of Honor

Head coaching record
- Regular season: NCAA: 16–27–2 (.378); NFL: 52–43 (.547)
- Postseason: NFL: 3–3 (.500)
- Career: NFL: 58–49 (.542)
- Coaching profile at Pro Football Reference

Jerome Monahan Burns (January 24, 1927 – May 12, 2021) was an American college and professional football coach. He played in college for the Michigan Wolverines before becoming a coach. He was the head coach for the Iowa Hawkeyes from 1961 to 1965, compiling a record of 16–27–2, and for the Minnesota Vikings of the National Football League (NFL) from 1986 to 1991, tallying a mark of 52–43 in the regular season, and 3–3 in the postseason. Between his head coaching stints Burns was a defensive assistant (1965–1967) for the Green Bay Packers, helping the team win Super Bowls I and II, and Offensive Coordinator (1968–1985) for the Minnesota Vikings, where he coached the team to four Super Bowl appearances.

== Early coaching career ==
Burns served as the head baseball coach and assistant football coach with the University of Hawaii in 1951. Burns left Hawaii to coach at Whittier College in 1952, where he was the head basketball coach and an assistant football coach. At the beginning of 1953, he left Whittier and took a job as head football and head basketball coach at St. Mary's of Redford High School in Detroit, Michigan. Following the 1953 football season at St. Mary's, Burns was hired by fellow Michigan alumnus Forest Evashevski as an assistant coach at the University of Iowa. Burns began serving as an assistant coach at Iowa under Evashevski in 1954.

== Iowa head coach ==
Burns served seven total years as an assistant coach to Evashevski. As part of a deal with Iowa Athletic Board, Evashevski was appointed Iowa's athletic director and agreed to appoint his successor. He then appointed Burns to become Iowa's 20th head football coach beginning with the 1961 season.

Before his first game as a college head coach, the 1961 Hawkeye team was named the number one team in the AP Preseason Poll. Iowa started the season by winning their first four games in 1961 before losing their next four. In their final game, the Hawkeyes defeated Notre Dame 42–21 for the team's fifth win in six years over the Irish. Iowa finished the season 5–4, their last winning record until 1981.

In 1962, Iowa defeated both Michigan and Ohio State, the only time in school history that the school had defeated both teams in the same year. However, the Hawkeyes won only two other games and posted a 4–5 final record. The school's final game of the season against Notre Dame was canceled on account of the assassination of John F. Kennedy. The Hawkeyes finished 1963 with a 3–3–2 record.

A 3–0 start in the 1964 season quickly turned sour, as the Hawkeyes lost their final six games. Burns was now in real danger of being fired, but Iowa had several players returning in 1965 and the Hawkeyes were expected to be very good; Playboy Magazine picked Iowa as their Preseason Number One team and predicted a 9–1 record. Instead, Iowa finished the year 1–9 and, before Iowa's final game that season, it was announced that Burns would not be retained in 1966.

Of his firing, Burns said, "I want to be emphatic. I hold no ill feelings toward anyone. I hope, I sincerely hope, Iowa has great success in football in the future. If I can contribute to that future, I will." After his final game, his players hoisted him on their shoulders and carried him off the field, despite the loss. There were those who insisted that Athletic Director Evashevski wanted to return as football coach and that rather than helping Burns to succeed, Evashevski hampered him with rules and regulations that were not in force when he was the coach. But Burns ultimately said, "If we have failed, and we have, I'll take the responsibility for that. It is not the players' fault. They have done the best they can." He had a 16–27–2 record at Iowa.

== Professional coaching career ==
Burns was 38 years of age when he was fired at Iowa. He moved on to the Green Bay Packers of the NFL and served for two years as an assistant coach to Vince Lombardi in 1966 and 1967 when the Packers won Super Bowl I and Super Bowl II. When Lombardi retired after the 1967 season, Burns was hired by Bud Grant of the Minnesota Vikings. Grant hired Burns to be his offensive coordinator. Burns served as Minnesota's offensive coordinator for the next 18 years, from 1968 to 1985. During that time, the Vikings made the playoffs 12 times, won 11 division titles, and played in four Super Bowls.

When Grant retired after the 1983 season, Burns was expected to succeed him, but wide receivers coach Les Steckel was promoted instead. Steckel was fired after only one season, and Grant was brought back for the 1984 season. Grant retired for good after the 1985 season, and Burns was named as the 4th head coach of the Minnesota Vikings on January 7, 1986. He coached Minnesota for six years, from 1986 to 1991. Burns compiled a record of 52–43 and led the Vikings to the playoffs three times. He led them to the NFC championship game in 1987, and helped the Vikings win the division title in 1989. On November 5, 1989, Burns gave a profanity laced tirade during a postgame press conference where he defended his offensive coordinator, Bob Schnelker, despite the fact that the Vikings' Rich Karlis kicked a then league record-tying seven field goals en route to a 23–21 overtime victory over the Los Angeles Rams.

On December 4, 1991, Burns announced that he would retire from coaching after the 1991 NFL season; he finished his final season with an 8–8 record. He has been nominated for the Pro Football Hall of Fame, but has yet to gain the votes necessary for induction. In 1998, Burns gave the Hall of Fame induction speech for Paul Krause, a defensive back he coached both at Iowa and with the Vikings.

== Death ==
Burns died on May 12, 2021, at the age of 94, at his home in Eden Prairie, Minnesota. He had been struggling with a variety of ongoing health issues. The Minnesota Vikings, former Vikings Head Coach Bud Grant, then Vikings Head Coach Mike Zimmer, and Hall of Fame Quarterback Fran Tarkenton released statements paying tribute.

== Head coaching record ==
=== College football ===
Year	Team	Overall	Conference	Standing	Bowl/playoffs
Iowa Hawkeyes (Big Ten Conference) (1961–1965)
1961	Iowa	5–4	2–4	T–7th	
1962	Iowa	4–5	3–3	T–5th	
1963	Iowa	3–3–2	2–3–1	8th	
1964	Iowa	3–6	1–5	T–9th	
1965	Iowa	1–9	0–7	10th	
Iowa:		16–27–2	8–22–1		
Total:		16–27–2			

=== NFL ===
Team	Year	Regular season					Postseason			
Team	Year	Won	Lost	Ties	Win %	Finish	Won	Lost	Win %	Result
MIN	1986	9	7	0	.563	2nd in NFC Central	–	–	–	–
MIN	1987	8	7	0	.533	2nd in NFC Central	2	1	.667	Lost to Washington Redskins in NFC Championship Game
MIN	1988	11	5	0	.688	2nd in NFC Central	1	1	.500	Lost to San Francisco 49ers in NFC Divisional Game
MIN	1989	10	6	0	.625	1st in NFC Central	0	1	.000	Lost to San Francisco 49ers in NFC Divisional Game
MIN	1990	6	10	0	.375	5th in NFC Central	–	–	–	–
MIN	1991	8	8	0	.500	3rd in NFC Central	–	–	–	–
MIN Total		52	43	0	.547		3	3	.500	
