= 1962 Indiana Hoosiers football team =

American college football season

1962 Indiana Hoosiers football
- Conference: Big Ten Conference
- Record: 3–6 (1–5 Big Ten)
- Head coach: Phil Dickens (5th season)
- MVP: Woody Moore
- Captain: Nate Ramsey
- Home stadium: Seventeenth Street Stadium

1962 Big Ten Conference football standings
	Conf.					Overall
Team	W		L		T	W		L		T
No. 2 Wisconsin $	6	–	1	–	0	8	–	2	–	0
No. 10 Minnesota	5	–	2	–	0	6	–	2	–	1
Northwestern	4	–	2	–	0	7	–	2	–	0
Ohio State	4	–	2	–	0	6	–	3	–	0
Michigan State	3	–	3	–	0	5	–	4	–	0
Purdue	3	–	3	–	0	4	–	4	–	1
Iowa	3	–	3	–	0	4	–	5	–	0
Illinois	2	–	5	–	0	2	–	7	–	0
Indiana	1	–	5	–	0	3	–	6	–	0
Michigan	1	–	6	–	0	2	–	7	–	0
$ – Conference champion; Rankings from AP Poll

The 1962 Indiana Hoosiers football team represented the Indiana Hoosiers in the 1962 Big Ten Conference football season. They participated as members of the Big Ten Conference. The Hoosiers played their home games at Seventeenth Street Stadium in Bloomington, Indiana. The team was coached by Phil Dickens, in his fifth year as head coach of the Hoosiers.

== Schedule ==
Date	Opponent	Site	Result	Attendance	Source
September 22	Kansas State*	Seventeenth Street Stadium; Bloomington, IN	W 21–0	17,892	
September 29	at Cincinnati*	Nippert Stadium; Cincinnati, OH	W 26–6	14,000	
October 6	at Wisconsin	Camp Randall Stadium; Madison, WI	L 6–30	41,354	
October 13	Iowa	Seventeenth Street Stadium; Bloomington, IN	L 10–14	29,771	
October 20	at Washington State*	Joe Albi Stadium; Spokane, WA	L 15–21	15,500	
October 27	No. 10 Michigan State	Seventeenth Street Stadium; Bloomington, IN (rivalry)	L 8–26	24,377	
November 3	No. 1 Northwestern^{†}	Seventeenth Street Stadium; Bloomington, IN	L 21–26	26,468	
November 10	at Ohio State	Ohio Stadium; Columbus, OH	L 7–10	75,378	
November 24	at Purdue	Ross–Ade Stadium; West Lafayette, IN (Old Oaken Bucket)	W 12–7	50,243	
*Non-conference game; ^{†}Homecoming; Rankings from AP Poll released prior to the game; Source:

== NFL draft ==
Player	Position	Round	Pick	NFL club
John Johnson	Tackle	6	80	Chicago Bears
Nate Ramsey	Back	14	186	Philadelphia Eagles
Jeff Slabaugh	End	18	249	Chicago Bears
Mike Wasdovich	Guard	19	256	Philadelphia Eagles
