= Paul Flatley =

American football player (1941–2025)

No. 85
- Position: Wide receiver

Personal information
- Born: January 30, 1941; Richmond, Indiana, U.S.
- Died: March 15, 2025 (aged 84)
- Listed height: 6 ft 1 in (1.85 m)
- Listed weight: 187 lb (85 kg)

Career information
- High school: Richmond
- College: Northwestern
- NFL draft: 1963: 4th round, 44th overall pick
- AFL draft: 1963: 7th round, 53rd overall pick

Career history
- Minnesota Vikings (1963–1967); Atlanta Falcons (1968–1970); New England Patriots (1971)*
- * Offseason or practice squad member only

Awards and highlights
- UPI NFL-NFC Rookie of the Year (1963); Pro Bowl (1966); Third-team All-American (1962); Second-team All-Big Ten (1962)

Career NFL statistics
- Receptions: 306
- Receiving yards: 4,905
- Receiving touchdowns: 24
- Stats at Pro Football Reference

Paul Richard Flatley (January 30, 1941 – March 15, 2025) was an American professional football player who was a wide receiver in the National Football League (NFL) from 1963 to 1970. He was the NFL's Rookie of the Year in 1963, and was selected to play in the 1966 Pro Bowl.

== Early life ==
Flatley was born on January 30, 1941, in Richmond, Indiana, to Richard and Bernadine Flatley. He was the oldest of three children (including brother Carl and sister Ellen) raised by their mother in Richmond, who worked to support them.

He attended Richmond High School, graduating in 1959. He played on the football team at running back for two years, until coach Hub Etchison moved Flatley to quarterback in 1958 as a senior. Flatley led the team to a 9–0 record, winning the North Central Conference. Both the Associated Press (AP) and United Press International (UPI) named Flatley All-State at quarterback; and he was also selected All-North Central Conference. He was also a member of the school's basketball team. During high school, he worked part time at a service station.

In 2009, Richmond High School honored Flatley by retiring his No. 33 jersey, the third player in school history so honored along with NFL players Lamar Lundy and Vagas Ferguson.

== College ==
In 1958, Etchison recommended Flatley to a Northwestern University Wildcats assistant football coach, and Flatley later chose to attend Northwestern, where he played college football under College Football Hall of Fame coach Ara Parseghian from 1960 to 1962. He selected Northwestern from among 33 scholarship offers because of its academic program and Parseghian.

Although he came out of high school at quarterback, Parseghian switched Flatley to running back as a freshman. As a sophomore in 1960, Flatley had nine rushing attempts. In 1961, as a junior, he had 50 rushing attempts for 156 yards and two touchdowns, as well as six receptions for 75 yards and one touchdown. Parseghian moved Flatley to flanker back (receiver) as a senior in 1962, coinciding with Tom Myers becoming the team's quarterback. Flatley believed it was the opportunity to play with Myers that led to his becoming an NFL player.

In 1962, Flatley caught 45 passes for 626 yards and five touchdowns, leading the Big Ten in all three categories; while Myers led the Big Ten in passing completion percentage, yards, touchdowns and yards per attempt, among other categories. His 45 receptions also broke a 12-year-old school record.

Over the summer of 1962 while at home in Richmond, Flatley worked hard individually to develop his receiving skills in preparing for the fall football season. During the 1962 college football season, he caught six passes for 102 yards and two touchdowns in a game against Notre Dame, where he made a one-handed catch that Parseghian considered one of the greatest receptions he had ever witnessed. He also had six receptions for 108 yards and one touchdown against Minnesota; and 10 receptions for 97 yards and a touchdown against Ohio State. Parseghian considered Flatley one of the finest natural pass receivers he had ever seen.

Northwestern began the season 6–0, but finished with a 7–2 record. While still undefeated, the Wildcats were ranked No. 1 by the Associated Press during the seventh and eighth weeks of the 1962 college football season.

Flatley participated in the 1962 East-West Shrine Game and the Hula Bowl. He caught a touchdown pass from future American Football League (AFL)/NFL star quarterback Daryle Lamonica in the East-West game. He also was the starting flanker in the 1963 Chicago College All-Star Game against the Green Bay Packers, in which he was a standout player. The college players defeated the Packers in what Vince Lombardi called his most embarrassing loss as a coach. He was named Academic All-Big Ten and an Academic All-American.

== Professional career ==
During his professional career, he played for the Minnesota Vikings (1963–1967) and the Atlanta Falcons (1968–1970).

=== Minnesota Vikings ===
The Minnesota Vikings selected Flatley in the fourth round of the 1963 NFL draft (44th overall). The Denver Broncos selected him in the seventh round of the 1963 American Football League draft (53rd overall). In 1962, the Cleveland Browns had mistakenly attempted to draft Flatley, believing he was a senior. He joined the Vikings under head coach Norm Van Brocklin, who was later inducted into the Pro Football Hall of Fame for his play at quarterback. During Flatley's rookie season, Van Brocklin worked at length with him on footwork and running pass patterns.

In his 1963 rookie season with the Vikings, Flatley started all 14 games. His standout game came in late November against the Detroit Lions, with six receptions for 174 yards (a team record for a single game). On the season, Flatley had 51 receptions for 867 yards and four touchdowns, leading the Vikings in each of those categories and tied for tenth in the NFL in receptions and receiving yards. He was named the NFL's Rookie of the Year by the Associated Press (AP), ahead of future Hall of Fame tight end John Mackey of the Baltimore Colts. Flatley also was selected as the UPI's Rookie of the Year. Flatley credited Van Brocklin and ends coach Darrel Brewster with his rookie success. He served six months in the National Guard after his rookie season.

Flatley suffered a shoulder separation in Game 7 of the 1964 season against the San Francisco 49ers (October 25, 1964), and played in only 10 games that year. He ended the season with 28 receptions for 450 yards. In 1965, he started all 14 games, with 50 receptions for 896 yards and seven touchdowns. On October 24, 1965, almost one year after he was injured against San Francisco, he caught seven passes for 202 yards and two touchdowns from Fran Tarkenton against the 49ers, including one touchdown reception for 58 yards. The 202 yards set a new team record. For the 1965 season, Flatley was sixth in the NFL in receiving yards, eighth in yards per reception (17.9), ninth in touchdown receptions and 10th in total receptions.

In 1966, Flatley was selected to the Pro Bowl for the first and only time in his career. He started 12 games and again had 50 receptions, though his yardage and touchdowns decreased to 777 and three. He missed 2½ games because of injuries in 1966.

In 1967, future Hall of Fame coach Bud Grant replaced Van Brocklin. Grant was strict and a stickler for what he expected from his players. In an August practice session, Grant stopped a drill with the directive to Flatley, "'Fasten that chin strap'". Flatley started 13 games that season, but suffered injuries and had only 23 receptions for 232 yards.

After years of a good relationship with Van Brocklin, Flatley did not get on well with Grant in 1967, and was waived before the start of the 1968 season on September 9. He had asked to be traded in 1967. Flatley was upset at the time of his September 1968 waiver, and felt his release was a slap in the face by Grant, reflecting a conflict between their two personalities. He had started all five exhibition games before the 1968 season, and believed he merited staying on the team. Flatley believed he was a better receiver than the two players Grant kept in his place. Flatley did deliver a message in the Minneapolis and St. Paul press wishing the Vikings and their fans the best. When Flatley left the Vikings, he was the team's career leader in total receptions, receiving yardage and receiving touchdowns.

=== Atlanta Falcons ===
Flatley was signed by the Atlanta Falcons the day after being released by the Vikings. He had been cut along with quarterback Bob Berry, and both signed with the Falcons. The Falcons had only joined the NFL two years earlier. In 1968, he was originally coached by Norb Hecker, but Hecker was fired after two games and Van Brocklin became the new head coach. Flatley later said it was a joy to play under Van Brocklin again.

Flatley started five games in 1968, with 20 receptions and 305 yards. Flatley rebounded the following year. He started all 14 games and had 45 receptions for 834 yards and six touchdowns. His 18.5 yards per reception was the best average of his career. He was seventh in the NFL in yards per reception and ninth in the NFL in receiving yards. His final season came in 1970. He again started all 14 games for the Falcons, with 39 receptions for 544 yards. He had knee surgery after the season ended.

Flatley asked to be put on waivers by the Falcons in 1971, and was signed by the New England Patriots. However, the Patriots team doctor advised Flatley against playing again because his knees were in such poor condition. While Flatley thought he might be able to get himself back into playing shape over a period of months, he concluded that was impractical and announced his retirement in July 1971, at age 30. He also realized that with the merger of the AFL and NFL, the bump and run defense was becoming more prevalent and he lacked the speed to beat it or the strength to overcome it.

== NFL career statistics ==
Legend
**Bold**	Career high

Year	Team	Games		Receiving				
Year	Team	GP	GS	Rec	Yds	Avg	Lng	TD
1963	MIN	14	14	**51**	867	17.0	62	4
1964	MIN	10	10	28	450	16.1	48	3
1965	MIN	14	14	50	**896**	17.9	58	**7**
1966	MIN	13	12	50	777	15.5	41	3
1967	MIN	13	13	23	232	10.1	27	0
1968	ATL	14	5	20	305	15.3	66	0
1969	ATL	14	14	45	834	**18.5**	**71**	6
1970	ATL	14	14	39	544	13.9	35	1
Career		106	96	306	4,905	16.0	71	24

== Legacy and honors ==
Hall of Fame Vikings quarterback Fran Tarkenton said of Flatley, "'He was as good as the statistics indicate. He was so effective because he was so active and mobile. I owed a great deal of my success to him'".

Van Brocklin said "'Paul Flatley may not have blazing speed, but he's thinking all through the game. He'll outwit a defender with his brains and legs, and he can catch anything with his fantastic hands'".

Flatley is a member of the Indiana Football Hall of Fame and the Chicagoland Sports Hall of Fame.

== Broadcasting career ==
He was a member of the Minnesota Golden Gopher football radio broadcast team on WCCO as a color commentator, alongside Ray Christensen for many years. He also did pre- and post-game radio programs for Vikings games on WCCO, including with Bill Diehl. Flatley would conduct interviews with Vikings players before the games, and handle fan call-ins to the post-game program. He was known for his direct and honest opinions on the Vikings, whether positive or negative.

== Personal life ==
Flatley worked as a stockbroker in Minnesota in the off season during his career. He lived in Minnetonka, Minnesota, for over 30 years, but moved back to Richmond in 2000. He had not been close to fellow Richmond native, and contemporaneous NFL player, Lamar Lundy, who was nearly six years older than Flatley. They became very close after Flatley moved back to Richmond where Lundy was living, until Lundy's death in 2007. Flatley would travel the world on annual trips with his brother Carl and sister Ellen.

He founded Flatley Technical Services in Minneapolis, a temporary employment services business, which also provided temporary employment services in Denver, Kansas City, Orlando and West Palm Beach.

== Death ==
Flatley died from sepsis on March 15, 2025, at the age of 84. He was survived by his three daughters, eight grandchildren and brother Carl.
