= 1962 Iowa Hawkeyes football team =

American college football season

1962 Iowa Hawkeyes football
- Conference: Big Ten Conference
- Record: 4–5 (3–3 Big Ten)
- Head coach: Jerry Burns (2nd season)
- MVP: Larry Ferguson
- Captain: Larry Ferguson
- Home stadium: Iowa Stadium

1962 Big Ten Conference football standings
	Conf.					Overall
Team	W		L		T	W		L		T
No. 2 Wisconsin $	6	–	1	–	0	8	–	2	–	0
No. 10 Minnesota	5	–	2	–	0	6	–	2	–	1
Northwestern	4	–	2	–	0	7	–	2	–	0
Ohio State	4	–	2	–	0	6	–	3	–	0
Michigan State	3	–	3	–	0	5	–	4	–	0
Purdue	3	–	3	–	0	4	–	4	–	1
Iowa	3	–	3	–	0	4	–	5	–	0
Illinois	2	–	5	–	0	2	–	7	–	0
Indiana	1	–	5	–	0	3	–	6	–	0
Michigan	1	–	6	–	0	2	–	7	–	0
$ – Conference champion; Rankings from AP Poll

The 1962 Iowa Hawkeyes football team was an American football team that represented the University of Iowa as a member of the Big Ten Conference during the 1962 Big Ten football season. In their second season under head coach Jerry Burns, the Hawkeyes compiled a 4–5 record (3–3 against Big Ten opponents), tied for fifth place in the Big Ten, and were outscored by opponents by a total of 166 to 127.

Halfback Larry Ferguson was the team captain and was also selected as the team's most valuable player. The team's statistical leaders included quarterback Matt Szykowny with 737 passing yards, Ferguson with 547 rushing yards, Paul Krause with 214 receiving yards, and Cloyd Webb with 12 points scored. Three Hawkeyes were recognized by the Associated Press (AP) and/or the United Press International (UPI) on the 1962 All-Big Ten Conference football team: Ferguson (AP-2, UPI-1); guard Earl McQuiston (UPI-2); and guard Wally Hilgenberg (AP-3).

The team played its home games at Iowa Stadium in Iowa City, Iowa.

== Schedule ==
Date	Opponent	Site	Result	Attendance	Source
September 29	Oregon State*	Iowa Stadium; Iowa City, IA	W 28–8	54,400	
October 6	No. 6 USC*	Iowa Stadium; Iowa City, IA	L 0–7	55,300	
October 13	at Indiana	Seventeenth Street Stadium; Bloomington, IN	W 14–10	29,771	
October 20	at No. 10 Wisconsin	Camp Randall Stadium; Madison, WI (rivalry)	L 14–42	60,297	
October 27	Purdue^{†}	Iowa Stadium; Iowa City, IA	L 3–26	60,100	
November 3	Ohio State	Iowa Stadium; Iowa City, IA	W 28–14	58,400	
November 10	at No. 10 Minnesota	Memorial Stadium; Minneapolis, MN (rivalry)	L 0–10	65,087	
November 17	Michigan	Iowa Stadium; Iowa City, IA	W 28–14	52,880	
November 24	at Notre Dame*	Notre Dame Stadium; Notre Dame, IN	L 12–35	42,653	
*Non-conference game; ^{†}Homecoming; Rankings from AP Poll released prior to the game; Source:

== Game summaries ==
=== Oregon State ===
Lonnie Rogers boomed a school-record 83-yard punt, establishing a record that still stands.

=== Ohio State ===
Ohio State at Iowa

Team	1	2	3	4	Total
Buckeyes	0	7	7	0	14
• Hawkeyes	14	7	0	7	28

- Date: November 3, 1962
- Location: Iowa Stadium, Iowa City, Iowa
- Game attendance: 58,400
- Game weather: Cloudy, 44 °F (7 °C)

Scoring summary
Q1	5:00	IOWA	Grier 2-yard run (Roberts kick)	IOWA 7–0
Q1	2:40	IOWA	Szykowny 1-yard run (Roberts kick)	IOWA 14–0
Q2	14:28	OSU	Butts 1-yard run (Van Raaphorst kick)	IOWA 14–7
Q2	8:28	IOWA	Szykowny 1-yard run (Roberts kick)	IOWA 21–7
Q3	7:27	OSU	Katterhenrich 3-yard run (Van Raaphorst kick)	IOWA 21–14
Q4	1:32	IOWA	Sherman 1-yard run (Roberts kick)	IOWA 28–14

== Roster ==
1962 Iowa Hawkeyes football team roster
Players
Coaches
Offense

Pos.	#	Name	Class
HB	19	Larry Ferguson	Sr
FB		Joe Williams	Sr
QB	22	Matt Szykowny	Sr
WR		Cloyd Webb	Jr
OL	67	Wally Hilgenberg	Jr

Defense

Pos.	#	Name	Class
DB	16	Paul Krause	Jr
LB	61	Mike Reilly	Jr

Special teams

Pos.	#	Name	Class

Head coach

- Jerry Burns

Coordinators/assistant coaches

- Tom Moore – Graduate assistant

Legend

- (C) Team captain
- (S) Suspended
- (I) Ineligible
- Injured
- Redshirt

== 1963 NFL draft ==
Player	Position	Round	Pick	NFL club
Earl McQuiston	Guard	10	140	Green Bay Packers
Bill Perkins	Running back	12	160	Dallas Cowboys
Joe Williams	Back	14	194	New York Giants
Matt Szykowny	Back	15	207	Pittsburgh Steelers
