= 1962 Purdue Boilermakers football team =

American college football season

1962 Purdue Boilermakers football
- Conference: Big Ten Conference
- Record: 4–4–1 (3–3 Big Ten)
- Head coach: Jack Mollenkopf (7th season)
- MVP: Roy Walker
- Captains: Forest Farmer; Don Paltani
- Home stadium: Ross–Ade Stadium

1962 Big Ten Conference football standings
	Conf.					Overall
Team	W		L		T	W		L		T
No. 2 Wisconsin $	6	–	1	–	0	8	–	2	–	0
No. 10 Minnesota	5	–	2	–	0	6	–	2	–	1
Northwestern	4	–	2	–	0	7	–	2	–	0
Ohio State	4	–	2	–	0	6	–	3	–	0
Michigan State	3	–	3	–	0	5	–	4	–	0
Purdue	3	–	3	–	0	4	–	4	–	1
Iowa	3	–	3	–	0	4	–	5	–	0
Illinois	2	–	5	–	0	2	–	7	–	0
Indiana	1	–	5	–	0	3	–	6	–	0
Michigan	1	–	6	–	0	2	–	7	–	0
$ – Conference champion; Rankings from AP Poll

The 1962 Purdue Boilermakers football team was an American football team that represented Purdue University during the 1962 Big Ten Conference football season. In their seventh season under head coach Jack Mollenkopf, the Boilermakers compiled a 4–4–1 record, finished in fifth place in the Big Ten Conference with a 3–3 record against conference opponents, and outscored opponents by a total of 141 to 68.

Notable players from the 1962 Purdue football team included quarterback Ron DiGravio, fullback Roy Walker, end Forest Farmer, and tackle Don Brumm. Brumm was selected as a first-team All-American in 1962 by both the Associated Press and the Football Writers Association of America.

== Schedule ==
Date	Opponent	Rank	Site	Result	Attendance	Source
September 22	at No. 10 Washington*	No. 7	Husky Stadium; Seattle, WA	T 7–7	55,800	
October 6	at Notre Dame*		Notre Dame Stadium; Notre Dame, IN (rivalry)	W 24–6	61,296	
October 13	Miami (OH)*	No. 9	Ross–Ade Stadium; West Lafayette, IN	L 7–10	49,496	
October 20	Michigan		Ross–Ade Stadium; West Lafayette, IN	W 37–0	48,907	
October 27	at Iowa		Iowa Stadium; Iowa City, IA	W 26–3	60,100	
November 3	Illinois^{†}		Ross–Ade Stadium; West Lafayette, IN (rivalry)	L 10–14	45,496	
November 10	at Michigan State		Spartan Stadium; East Lansing, MI	W 17–9	70,059	
November 17	at No. 8 Minnesota		Memorial Stadium; Minneapolis, MN	L 6–7	59,760	
November 24	Indiana		Ross–Ade Stadium; West Lafayette, IN (Old Oaken Bucket)	L 7–12	50,243	
*Non-conference game; ^{†}Homecoming; Rankings from AP Poll released prior to the game; Source:

== Roster ==
- Thomas Bloom, RB
- Tom Boris, RB
- Don Brooks, WR
- Don Brumm, OL
- Babe DiFilippo, OL
- Ron DiGravio, QB
- Gene Donaldson, RB
- Henry Dudgeon, OL
- Dave Ellison, WR
- Forest Farmer, WR
- Wally Florence, OL
- Tom Fugate, RB
- Jim Garcia, OL
- Jack Greiner, WR
- Gary Hogan, QB
- Nate Jackson, OL
- Charlie King, RB
- Bob Lake, OL
- Sam Longmire, WR
- Terry Marcoline, RB
- Franklin Marks, RB
- Ron Meyer, QB
- Dave Miller, RB
- Don Paltani, OL
- George Pappas, OL
- Ron Richnafsky, OL
- Tom Schultz, WR
- Roy Walker, RB
- Steve Weil, RB
- Tom Yakubowski, RB
