= 1962 Northwestern Wildcats football team =

American college football season

1962 Northwestern Wildcats football
- Conference: Big Ten Conference

Ranking
- Coaches: No. 16
- Record: 7–2 (4–2 Big Ten)
- Head coach: Ara Parseghian (7th season)
- MVP: George Thomas
- Captain: Jay Robertson
- Home stadium: Dyche Stadium

1962 Big Ten Conference football standings
	Conf.					Overall
Team	W		L		T	W		L		T
No. 2 Wisconsin $	6	–	1	–	0	8	–	2	–	0
No. 10 Minnesota	5	–	2	–	0	6	–	2	–	1
Northwestern	4	–	2	–	0	7	–	2	–	0
Ohio State	4	–	2	–	0	6	–	3	–	0
Michigan State	3	–	3	–	0	5	–	4	–	0
Purdue	3	–	3	–	0	4	–	4	–	1
Iowa	3	–	3	–	0	4	–	5	–	0
Illinois	2	–	5	–	0	2	–	7	–	0
Indiana	1	–	5	–	0	3	–	6	–	0
Michigan	1	–	6	–	0	2	–	7	–	0
$ – Conference champion; Rankings from AP Poll

The 1962 Northwestern Wildcats team represented Northwestern University during the 1962 Big Ten Conference football season. In their seventh year under head coach Ara Parseghian, the Wildcats compiled a 7–2 record (4–2 against Big Ten Conference opponents) and finished in third place in the Big Ten Conference. The Wildcats were ranked No. 1 in the AP poll before losing consecutive games late in the season against No. 8 Wisconsin and Michigan State.

The team's offensive leaders were quarterback Tom Myers with 1,537 passing yards, Willie Stinson with 418 rushing yards, and halfback/end Paul Flatley with 626 receiving yards. Center Jack Cvercko was a consensus first-team All-American.

== Schedule ==
Date	Opponent	Rank	Site	Result	Attendance	Source
September 22	South Carolina*		Dyche Stadium; Evanston, IL	W 37–20	35,767	
October 6	Illinois		Dyche Stadium; Evanston, IL (rivalry)	W 45–0	41,854	
October 13	at Minnesota		Memorial Stadium; Minneapolis, MN	W 34–22	61,652	
October 20	at No. 6 Ohio State	No. 8	Ohio Stadium; Columbus, OH	W 18–14	84,376	
October 27	Notre Dame*	No. 3	Dyche Stadium; Evanston, IL (rivalry)	W 35–6	55,752	
November 3	at Indiana	No. 1	Seventeenth Street Stadium; Bloomington, IN	W 26–21	26,468	
November 10	at No. 8 Wisconsin	No. 1	Camp Randall Stadium; Madison, WI	L 6–37	65,501	
November 17	Michigan State	No. 9	Dyche Stadium; Evanston, IL	L 7–31	54,342	
November 23	at Miami (FL)*		Miami Orange Bowl; Miami, FL	W 29–7	60,341	
*Non-conference game; Rankings from AP Poll released prior to the game; Source:

== Players ==
- Jack Cvercko – guard (consensus 1st-team All-American; 1st-team All-Big Ten selection by AP and UPI)
- Paul Flatley – halfback/end (3rd-team All-America selection by The Sporting News; 2nd-team All-Big Ten selection by AP and UPI)
- Tom Myers – quarterback (3rd-team All-America selection by AFCA)
