= 1962 Wisconsin Badgers football team =

American college football season

1962 Wisconsin Badgers football

Big Ten champion

Rose Bowl, L 37–42 vs. USC
- Conference: Big Ten Conference

Ranking
- Coaches: No. 2
- AP: No. 2
- Record: 8–2 (6–1 Big Ten)
- Head coach: Milt Bruhn (7th season)
- MVP: Ron Vander Kelen
- Captains: Pat Richter; Steve Underwood
- Home stadium: Camp Randall Stadium

1962 Big Ten Conference football standings
| | Conf. | | | | | Overall |
| Team | W | | L | | T | W | | L | | T |
|---|---|---|---|---|---|---|---|---|---|---|
| No. 2 Wisconsin $ | 6 | – | 1 | – | 0 | 8 | – | 2 | – | 0 |
| No. 10 Minnesota | 5 | – | 2 | – | 0 | 6 | – | 2 | – | 1 |
| Northwestern | 4 | – | 2 | – | 0 | 7 | – | 2 | – | 0 |
| Ohio State | 4 | – | 2 | – | 0 | 6 | – | 3 | – | 0 |
| Michigan State | 3 | – | 3 | – | 0 | 5 | – | 4 | – | 0 |
| Purdue | 3 | – | 3 | – | 0 | 4 | – | 4 | – | 1 |
| Iowa | 3 | – | 3 | – | 0 | 4 | – | 5 | – | 0 |
| Illinois | 2 | – | 5 | – | 0 | 2 | – | 7 | – | 0 |
| Indiana | 1 | – | 5 | – | 0 | 3 | – | 6 | – | 0 |
| Michigan | 1 | – | 6 | – | 0 | 2 | – | 7 | – | 0 |
$ – Conference champion; Rankings from AP Poll

The 1962 Wisconsin Badgers football team was an American football team that represented the University of Wisconsin as a member of the Big Ten Conference during the 1962 Big Ten season. In their seventh year under head coach Milt Bruhn, the Badgers compiled an 8–2 record (6–1 in conference games), won the Big Ten championship, and outscored opponents by a total of 285 to 88. The Badgers were ranked No. 2 in the final AP and UPI polls, both released in early December. This remains the highest season-ending ranking in program history. Wisconsin met No. 1 USC in the 1963 Rose Bowl, the first bowl game in college football history to pair the top two ranked teams in the nation. The Badgers played home games at Camp Randall Stadium in Madison, Wisconsin.

Wisconsin opened the season by crushing New Mexico State and then subdued Indiana 30–6. On October 13, they defeated Notre Dame 17–8, which gave them a number 10 ranking. The Badgers then defeated the Iowa 42–15, which moved them up to fifth. A 14–7 loss to Ohio State the following week dropped Wisconsin out of the polls (top ten only). On November 3, the Badgers defeated struggling Michigan on the road, 34–12. This set up following week's homecoming game versus No. 1 Northwestern at Camp Randall Stadium. Eighth-ranked Wisconsin soundly defeated Northwestern 37–6, and moved up to fourth in the next poll. A win at Illinois set up a No. 3 Wisconsin vs No. 5 Minnesota battle for Paul Bunyan's Axe. Wisconsin won 14–9, securing the Big Ten title and the berth in the Rose Bowl, as well as a season-ending No. 2 ranking. At the time, the two major polls (AP, UPI) released their final editions prior to the bowl games, so Wisconsin's runner-up rank went unchanged after the bowl loss. However, the game was still a de facto national championship game as the winner would receive the Grantland Rice Trophy.

Quarterback Ron Vander Kelen won the Chicago Tribune Silver Football as the most valuable player in the Big Ten, and end Pat Richter was a consensus first-team All-American.

== Schedule ==
| Date | Opponent | Rank | Site | Result | Attendance | Source |
|---|---|---|---|---|---|---|
| September 29 | New Mexico State* | | Camp Randall Stadium; Madison, WI | W 69–13 | 40,495 | |
| October 6 | Indiana | | Camp Randall Stadium; Madison, WI | W 30–6 | 41,354 | |
| October 13 | Notre Dame* | | Camp Randall Stadium; Madison, WI | W 17–8 | 61,098 | |
| October 20 | Iowa | No. 10 | Camp Randall Stadium; Madison, WI (rivalry) | W 42–14 | 60,297 | |
| October 27 | at Ohio State | No. 5 | Ohio Stadium; Columbus, OH | L 7–14 | 82,540 | |
| November 3 | at Michigan | | Michigan Stadium; Ann Arbor, MI | W 34–12 | 53,789 | |
| November 10 | No. 1 Northwestern^{†} | No. 8 | Camp Randall Stadium; Madison, WI | W 37–6 | 65,501 | |
| November 17 | at Illinois | No. 4 | Memorial Stadium; Champaign, IL | W 35–6 | 36,762 | |
| November 24 | No. 5 Minnesota | No. 3 | Camp Randall Stadium; Madison, WI (rivalry) | W 14–9 | 65,514 | |
| January 1, 1963 | vs. No. 1 USC* | No. 2 | Rose Bowl; Pasadena, CA (Rose Bowl) | L 37–42 | 98,698 | |
*Non-conference game; ^{†}Homecoming; Rankings from AP Poll released prior to the game; Source:

== Game summaries ==
=== vs New Mexico State ===
New Mexico State Aggies (1–1) at Wisconsin Badgers (0–0) – Game summary

| Quarter | 1 | 2 | 3 | 4 | Total |
|---|---|---|---|---|---|
| Aggies | 0 | 0 | 6 | 7 | 13 |
| Badgers | 13 | 21 | 35 | 0 | 69 |

at Camp Randall Stadium • Madison, WI

- Date: September 29
- Game time: 1:30 p.m. CDT
- Game attendance: 40,495

| Statistics | NMSU | WISC |
|---|---|---|
| First downs | 0 | 0 |
| Plays–yards | 0–0 | 0–0 |
| Rushes–yards | 0–0 | 0–0 |
| Passing yards | 0 | 0 |
| Passing: comp–att–int | 0–0–0 | 0–0–0 |
| Turnovers | 0 | 0 |
| Time of possession | 0:00 | 0:00 |

| Team | Category | Player | Statistics |
|---|---|---|---|
| New Mexico State | Passing | | |
| New Mexico State | Rushing | | |
| New Mexico State | Receiving | | |
| Wisconsin | Passing | | |
| Wisconsin | Rushing | | |
| Wisconsin | Receiving | | |

Scoring summary

| Quarter | Time | Drive | | | Team | Scoring information | Score | |
| Quarter | Time | Plays | Yards | TOP | Team | Scoring information | NMSU | WISC |
|---|---|---|---|---|---|---|---|---|
| "TOP" = time of possession. For other American football terms, see Glossary of American football. | | | | | | | 13 | 69 |

=== vs Indiana ===
Indiana Hoosiers (2–0) at Wisconsin Badgers (1–0) – Game summary

| Quarter | 1 | 2 | 3 | 4 | Total |
|---|---|---|---|---|---|
| Hoosiers | 0 | 0 | 6 | 0 | 6 |
| Badgers | 7 | 7 | 10 | 6 | 30 |

at Camp Randall Stadium • Madison, WI

- Date: October 6
- Game time: 1:30 p.m. CDT
- Game attendance: 41,354

| Statistics | IU | WISC |
|---|---|---|
| First downs | 0 | 0 |
| Plays–yards | 0–0 | 0–0 |
| Rushes–yards | 0–0 | 0–0 |
| Passing yards | 0 | 0 |
| Passing: comp–att–int | 0–0–0 | 0–0–0 |
| Turnovers | 0 | 0 |
| Time of possession | 0:00 | 0:00 |

| Team | Category | Player | Statistics |
|---|---|---|---|
| Indiana | Passing | | |
| Indiana | Rushing | | |
| Indiana | Receiving | | |
| Wisconsin | Passing | | |
| Wisconsin | Rushing | | |
| Wisconsin | Receiving | | |

Scoring summary

| Quarter | Time | Drive | | | Team | Scoring information | Score | |
| Quarter | Time | Plays | Yards | TOP | Team | Scoring information | IU | WISC |
|---|---|---|---|---|---|---|---|---|
| "TOP" = time of possession. For other American football terms, see Glossary of American football. | | | | | | | 6 | 30 |

=== vs Notre Dame ===
Notre Dame Fighting Irish (1–1) at Wisconsin Badgers (2–0) – Game summary

| Quarter | 1 | 2 | 3 | 4 | Total |
|---|---|---|---|---|---|
| Fighting Irish | 0 | 0 | 0 | 8 | 8 |
| Badgers | 10 | 0 | 7 | 0 | 17 |

at Camp Randall Stadium • Madison, WI

- Date: October 13
- Game time: 1:30 p.m. CDT
- Game attendance: 61,098

| Statistics | ND | WISC |
|---|---|---|
| First downs | 0 | 0 |
| Plays–yards | 0–0 | 0–0 |
| Rushes–yards | 0–0 | 0–0 |
| Passing yards | 0 | 0 |
| Passing: comp–att–int | 0–0–0 | 0–0–0 |
| Turnovers | 0 | 0 |
| Time of possession | 0:00 | 0:00 |

| Team | Category | Player | Statistics |
|---|---|---|---|
| Notre Dame | Passing | | |
| Notre Dame | Rushing | | |
| Notre Dame | Receiving | | |
| Wisconsin | Passing | | |
| Wisconsin | Rushing | | |
| Wisconsin | Receiving | | |

Scoring summary

| Quarter | Time | Drive | | | Team | Scoring information | Score | |
| Quarter | Time | Plays | Yards | TOP | Team | Scoring information | ND | WISC |
|---|---|---|---|---|---|---|---|---|
| "TOP" = time of possession. For other American football terms, see Glossary of American football. | | | | | | | 8 | 17 |

=== vs Iowa (Heartland Trophy) ===
Iowa Hawkeyes (2–1) at No. 10 Wisconsin Badgers (3–0) – Game summary

| Quarter | 1 | 2 | 3 | 4 | Total |
|---|---|---|---|---|---|
| Hawkeyes | 7 | 7 | 0 | 0 | 14 |
| No. 10 Badgers | 0 | 28 | 14 | 0 | 42 |

at Camp Randall Stadium • Madison, WI

- Date: October 20
- Game time: 1:30 p.m. CDT
- Game attendance: 60,297

| Statistics | IOWA | WISC |
|---|---|---|
| First downs | 0 | 0 |
| Plays–yards | 0–0 | 0–0 |
| Rushes–yards | 0–0 | 0–0 |
| Passing yards | 0 | 0 |
| Passing: comp–att–int | 0–0–0 | 0–0–0 |
| Turnovers | 0 | 0 |
| Time of possession | 0:00 | 0:00 |

| Team | Category | Player | Statistics |
|---|---|---|---|
| Iowa | Passing | | |
| Iowa | Rushing | | |
| Iowa | Receiving | | |
| Wisconsin | Passing | | |
| Wisconsin | Rushing | | |
| Wisconsin | Receiving | | |

Scoring summary

| Quarter | Time | Drive | | | Team | Scoring information | Score | |
| Quarter | Time | Plays | Yards | TOP | Team | Scoring information | IOWA | WISC |
|---|---|---|---|---|---|---|---|---|
| "TOP" = time of possession. For other American football terms, see Glossary of American football. | | | | | | | 14 | 42 |

=== at Ohio State ===
No. 5 Wisconsin Badgers (4–0) at Ohio State Buckeyes (2–2) – Game summary

| Quarter | 1 | 2 | 3 | 4 | Total |
|---|---|---|---|---|---|
| No. 5 Badgers | 0 | 7 | 0 | 0 | 7 |
| Buckeyes | 7 | 0 | 0 | 7 | 14 |

at Ohio Stadium • Columbus, OH

- Date: October 27
- Game time: 12:00 p.m. CDT
- Game weather: Cloudy, wind SSW 15 mph, 44 °F (7 °C)
- Game attendance: 82,540
- TV announcers (CBS): Bill Flemming and Johnny Lujack

| Statistics | WISC | OSU |
|---|---|---|
| First downs | 12 | 16 |
| Plays–yards | 56–217 | 71–246 |
| Rushes–yards | 34–106 | 61–213 |
| Passing yards | 111 | 33 |
| Passing: comp–att–int | 7–22–0 | 3–10–1 |
| Turnovers | 2 | 1 |
| Time of possession | 0:00 | 0:00 |

| Team | Category | Player | Statistics |
|---|---|---|---|
| Wisconsin | Passing | | |
| Wisconsin | Rushing | | |
| Wisconsin | Receiving | | |
| Ohio State | Passing | | |
| Ohio State | Rushing | | |
| Ohio State | Receiving | | |

Scoring summary

| Quarter | Time | Drive | | | Team | Scoring information | Score | |
| Quarter | Time | Plays | Yards | TOP | Team | Scoring information | WISC | OSU |
|---|---|---|---|---|---|---|---|---|
| 1 | 1:11 | | | | Ohio State | Warfield 21-yard touchdown reception from Sparma, Van Raaphorst kick good | 0 | 7 |
| 2 | 5:31 | | | | Wisconsin | Scott 47-yard touchdown reception from Vander Kleen, Kroner kick good | 7 | 7 |
| 4 | 7:16 | | | | Ohio State | Mummey 1-yard touchdown run, Van Raaphorst kick good | 7 | 14 |
| "TOP" = time of possession. For other American football terms, see Glossary of American football. | | | | | | | 7 | 14 |

=== at Michigan ===
Wisconsin Badgers (4–1) at Michigan Wolverines (1–4) – Game summary

| Quarter | 1 | 2 | 3 | 4 | Total |
|---|---|---|---|---|---|
| Badgers | 7 | 7 | 0 | 20 | 34 |
| Wolverines | 12 | 0 | 0 | 0 | 12 |

at Michigan Stadium • Ann Arbor, MI

- Date: November 3
- Game time: 12:30 p.m. CDT
- Game attendance: 53,789

| Statistics | WISC | MICH |
|---|---|---|
| First downs | 0 | 0 |
| Plays–yards | 0–0 | 0–0 |
| Rushes–yards | 0–0 | 0–0 |
| Passing yards | 0 | 0 |
| Passing: comp–att–int | 0–0–0 | 0–0–0 |
| Turnovers | 0 | 0 |
| Time of possession | 0:00 | 0:00 |

| Team | Category | Player | Statistics |
|---|---|---|---|
| Wisconsin | Passing | | |
| Wisconsin | Rushing | | |
| Wisconsin | Receiving | | |
| Michigan | Passing | | |
| Michigan | Rushing | | |
| Michigan | Receiving | | |

Scoring summary

| Quarter | Time | Drive | | | Team | Scoring information | Score | |
| Quarter | Time | Plays | Yards | TOP | Team | Scoring information | WISC | MICH |
|---|---|---|---|---|---|---|---|---|
| "TOP" = time of possession. For other American football terms, see Glossary of American football. | | | | | | | 34 | 12 |

=== vs No. 1 Northwestern ===
No. 1 Northwestern Wildcats (6–0) at No. 8 Wisconsin Badgers (5–1) – Game summary

| Quarter | 1 | 2 | 3 | 4 | Total |
|---|---|---|---|---|---|
| No. 1 Wildcats | 0 | 0 | 0 | 6 | 6 |
| No. 8 Badgers | 7 | 3 | 21 | 6 | 37 |

at Camp Randall Stadium • Madison, WI

- Date: November 10
- Game time: 1:30 p.m. CST
- Game attendance: 65,501

| Statistics | NU | WISC |
|---|---|---|
| First downs | 0 | 0 |
| Plays–yards | 0–0 | 0–0 |
| Rushes–yards | 0–0 | 0–0 |
| Passing yards | 0 | 0 |
| Passing: comp–att–int | 0–0–0 | 0–0–0 |
| Turnovers | 0 | 0 |
| Time of possession | 0:00 | 0:00 |

| Team | Category | Player | Statistics |
|---|---|---|---|
| Northwestern | Passing | | |
| Northwestern | Rushing | | |
| Northwestern | Receiving | | |
| Wisconsin | Passing | | |
| Wisconsin | Rushing | | |
| Wisconsin | Receiving | | |

Scoring summary

| Quarter | Time | Drive | | | Team | Scoring information | Score | |
| Quarter | Time | Plays | Yards | TOP | Team | Scoring information | NU | WISC |
|---|---|---|---|---|---|---|---|---|
| "TOP" = time of possession. For other American football terms, see Glossary of American football. | | | | | | | 6 | 37 |

=== at Illinois ===
No. 4 Wisconsin Badgers (6–1) at Illinois Fighting Illini (1–6) – Game summary

| Quarter | 1 | 2 | 3 | 4 | Total |
|---|---|---|---|---|---|
| No. 4 Badgers | 21 | 7 | 7 | 0 | 35 |
| Fighting Illini | 0 | 6 | 0 | 0 | 6 |

at Memorial Stadium • Champaign, IL

- Date: November 17
- Game time: 1:30 p.m. CST
- Game attendance: 36,762

| Statistics | WISC | ILL |
|---|---|---|
| First downs | 0 | 0 |
| Plays–yards | 0–0 | 0–0 |
| Rushes–yards | 0–0 | 0–0 |
| Passing yards | 0 | 0 |
| Passing: comp–att–int | 0–0–0 | 0–0–0 |
| Turnovers | 0 | 0 |
| Time of possession | 0:00 | 0:00 |

| Team | Category | Player | Statistics |
|---|---|---|---|
| Wisconsin | Passing | | |
| Wisconsin | Rushing | | |
| Wisconsin | Receiving | | |
| Illinois | Passing | | |
| Illinois | Rushing | | |
| Illinois | Receiving | | |

Scoring summary

| Quarter | Time | Drive | | | Team | Scoring information | Score | |
| Quarter | Time | Plays | Yards | TOP | Team | Scoring information | WISC | ILL |
|---|---|---|---|---|---|---|---|---|
| "TOP" = time of possession. For other American football terms, see Glossary of American football. | | | | | | | 35 | 6 |

=== vs No. 5 Minnesota (Paul Bunyan's Axe) ===
No. 5 Minnesota Golden Gophers (6–1–1) at No. 3 Wisconsin Badgers (7–1) – Game summary

| Quarter | 1 | 2 | 3 | 4 | Total |
|---|---|---|---|---|---|
| No. 5 Golden Gophers | 0 | 6 | 3 | 0 | 9 |
| No. 3 Badgers | 0 | 7 | 0 | 7 | 14 |

at Camp Randall Stadium • Madison, WI

- Date: November 24
- Game time: 1:30 p.m. CST
- Game attendance: 65,541

| Statistics | MINN | WISC |
|---|---|---|
| First downs | 0 | 0 |
| Plays–yards | 0–0 | 0–0 |
| Rushes–yards | 0–0 | 0–0 |
| Passing yards | 0 | 0 |
| Passing: comp–att–int | 0–0–0 | 0–0–0 |
| Turnovers | 0 | 0 |
| Time of possession | 0:00 | 0:00 |

| Team | Category | Player | Statistics |
|---|---|---|---|
| Minnesota | Passing | | |
| Minnesota | Rushing | | |
| Minnesota | Receiving | | |
| Wisconsin | Passing | | |
| Wisconsin | Rushing | | |
| Wisconsin | Receiving | | |

Scoring summary

| Quarter | Time | Drive | | | Team | Scoring information | Score | |
| Quarter | Time | Plays | Yards | TOP | Team | Scoring information | MINN | WISC |
|---|---|---|---|---|---|---|---|---|
| "TOP" = time of possession. For other American football terms, see Glossary of American football. | | | | | | | 9 | 14 |

=== vs No. 1 USC—1963 Rose Bowl ===
1963 Rose Bowl
No. 2 Wisconsin Badgers (8–1) vs. No. 1 USC Trojans (10–0) – Game summary

| Quarter | 1 | 2 | 3 | 4 | Total |
|---|---|---|---|---|---|
| No. 2 Badgers | 7 | 0 | 7 | 23 | 37 |
| No. 1 Trojans | 7 | 14 | 14 | 7 | 42 |

at Rose Bowl • Pasadena, CA

- Date: January 1, 1963
- Game time: 3:45 p.m. CST
- Game attendance: 98,698
- Referee: James Cain (AAWU)
- TV announcers (NBC): Mel Allen and Bill Symes

| Statistics | WISC | USC |
|---|---|---|
| First downs | 0 | 0 |
| Plays–yards | 0–0 | 0–0 |
| Rushes–yards | 0–0 | 0–0 |
| Passing yards | 0 | 0 |
| Passing: comp–att–int | 0–0–0 | 0–0–0 |
| Turnovers | 0 | 0 |
| Time of possession | 0:00 | 0:00 |

| Team | Category | Player | Statistics |
|---|---|---|---|
| Wisconsin | Passing | | |
| Wisconsin | Rushing | | |
| Wisconsin | Receiving | | |
| USC | Passing | | |
| USC | Rushing | | |
| USC | Receiving | | |

Scoring summary

| Quarter | Time | Drive | | | Team | Scoring information | Score | |
| Quarter | Time | Plays | Yards | TOP | Team | Scoring information | WISC | USC |
|---|---|---|---|---|---|---|---|---|
| "TOP" = time of possession. For other American football terms, see Glossary of American football. | | | | | | | 37 | 42 |

== Statistics and awards ==
The Badgers gained an average of 144.3 passing yards and 172.7 rushing yards per game. On defense, they gave up an average of 122.3 passing yards and 110.0 rushing yards per game.

After missing the 1961 season due to injury and being declared academically ineligible in 1962, quarterback Ron Vander Kelen won the Chicago Tribune Silver Football as the most valuable player in the Big Ten Conference and was also selected as Wisconsin's most valuable player. During the 1963 season, Vander Kelen completed 91 of 168 passes (54.2%) for 1,181 yards, 12 touchdowns, seven interceptions, and a passer rating of 128.5. He also finished ninth in the Heisman Trophy voting.

Senior end Pat Richter tallied 38 receptions for 531 yards and five touchdowns. He was a consensus first-team pick on the 1962 All-America team and finished sixth in the Heisman Trophy voting for 1962. He was inducted into the College Football Hall of Fame in 1996.

Halfback Ralph Kurek led the team with 367 rushing yards.

Richter and guard Steve Underwood were the team captains.

Seven Wisconsin players received first-, second- or third-team honors from the Associated Press (AP) or United Press International (UPI) on the 1963 All-Big Ten Conference football team: Richter at end (AP-1, UPI-1); Vander Kelen at quarterback (AP-1, UPI-1); Roger Pillath at tackle (AP-2, UPI-3); Steve Underwood at guard (AP-2, UPI-3); Jim Schenk (AP-2, UPI-3); Lou Holland at halfback (AP-3, UPI-3); and Don Carlson at end (AP-3).

Junior center Ken Bowman played ten seasons with the Green Bay Packers, winning three consecutive NFL titles under head coach Vince Lombardi.

== Roster ==
- E Pat Richter
- QB Ron Vander Kelen

== 1963 NFL draft ==
| Player | Position | Round | Pick | NFL club |
|---|---|---|---|---|
| Pat Richter | End | 1 | 7 | Washington Redskins |
| Gary Kroner | Back | 7 | 93 | Green Bay Packers |

- No Wisconsin Badgers were selected in the 1963 American Football League draft.
