= 1962 Michigan State Spartans football team =

American college football season

1962 Michigan State Spartans football
- Conference: Big Ten Conference
- Record: 5–4 (3–3 Big Ten)
- Head coach: Duffy Daugherty (9th season)
- MVP: George Saimes
- Captain: George Saimes
- Home stadium: Spartan Stadium

1962 Big Ten Conference football standings
	Conf.					Overall
Team	W		L		T	W		L		T
No. 2 Wisconsin $	6	–	1	–	0	8	–	2	–	0
No. 10 Minnesota	5	–	2	–	0	6	–	2	–	1
Northwestern	4	–	2	–	0	7	–	2	–	0
Ohio State	4	–	2	–	0	6	–	3	–	0
Michigan State	3	–	3	–	0	5	–	4	–	0
Purdue	3	–	3	–	0	4	–	4	–	1
Iowa	3	–	3	–	0	4	–	5	–	0
Illinois	2	–	5	–	0	2	–	7	–	0
Indiana	1	–	5	–	0	3	–	6	–	0
Michigan	1	–	6	–	0	2	–	7	–	0
$ – Conference champion; Rankings from AP Poll

The 1962 Michigan State Spartans football team represented Michigan State University in the 1962 Big Ten Conference football season. In their ninth season under head coach Duffy Daugherty, the Spartans compiled a 5–4 overall record 3–3 against Big Ten opponents) and finished in fifth place in the Big Ten Conference.

Two Spartans were selected as first-team players on the 1962 All-Big Ten Conference football team. Halfback George Saimes received first-team honors from the Associated Press (AP) and United Press International (UPI), and center Dave Behrman received first-team honors from the AP. Saimes was also a consensus first-team selection for the 1962 College Football All-America Team. Guard Ed Budde was selected by Time magazine as a first-team All-American.

The 1962 Spartans won all three of their annual rivalry games. In the annual Indiana–Michigan State football rivalry game, the Spartans defeated the Hoosiers by a 26 to 8 score. In the Notre Dame rivalry game, the Spartans defeated the Fighting Irish by a 31 to 7 score. And, in the annual Michigan–Michigan State football rivalry game, the Spartans defeated the Wolverines by a 28 to 0 score. In non-conference play, the Spartans defeated North Carolina (38–6) and lost to Stanford (16–13).

== Schedule ==
Date	Opponent	Rank	Site	Result	Attendance	Source
September 29	at Stanford*	No. 6	Stanford Stadium; Palo Alto, CA	L 13–16	32,500	
October 6	North Carolina*		Spartan Stadium; East Lansing, MI	W 38–6	61,029	
October 13	Michigan		Spartan Stadium; East Lansing, MI (rivalry)	W 28–0	77,501	
October 20	at Notre Dame*		Notre Dame Stadium; Notre Dame, IN (rivalry)	W 31–7	60,116	
October 27	at Indiana	No. 10	Seventeenth Street Stadium; Bloomington, IN (rivalry)	W 26–8	24,377	
November 3	Minnesota^{†}	No. 7	Spartan Stadium; East Lansing, MI	L 7–28	64,783	
November 10	Purdue		Spartan Stadium; East Lansing, MI	L 9–17	70,059	
November 17	at No. 9 Northwestern		Dyche Stadium; Evanston, IL	W 31–7	54,342	
November 24	at Illinois		Memorial Stadium; Champaign, IL	L 6–7	19,547	
*Non-conference game; ^{†}Homecoming; Rankings from AP Poll released prior to the game; Source:

== Roster ==
- FB George Saimes, Sr.
- RB Ron Rubick

== See also ==
- 1962 in Michigan
