= 1962 USC Trojans football team =

American college football season

1962 USC Trojans football

Consensus national champion AAWU champion Rose Bowl champion

Rose Bowl, W 42–37 vs. Wisconsin
- Conference: Athletic Association of Western Universities

Ranking
- Coaches: No. 1
- AP: No. 1
- Record: 11–0 (4–0 AAWU)
- Head coach: John McKay (3rd season)
- Offensive scheme: I formation
- Base defense: 5–2
- Captains: Marv Marinovich; Ben Wilson
- Home stadium: Los Angeles Memorial Coliseum

1962 Athletic Association of Western Universities football standings
	Conf.					Overall
Team	W		L		T	W		L		T
No. 1 USC $	4	–	0	–	0	11	–	0	–	0
Washington	4	–	1	–	0	7	–	1	–	2
Washington State	1	–	1	–	0	5	–	4	–	1
Stanford	2	–	3	–	0	5	–	5	–	0
UCLA	1	–	3	–	0	4	–	6	–	0
California	0	–	4	–	0	1	–	9	–	0
$ – Conference champion; Rankings from AP Poll

The 1962 USC Trojans football team represented the University of Southern California (USC) in the 1962 NCAA University Division football season. In their third year under head coach John McKay, the Trojans compiled an 11–0 record (4–0 against conference opponents), won the Athletic Association of Western Universities (AAWU or Big 6) championship, and defeated Wisconsin in the Rose Bowl on New Year's Day. USC outscored their opponents 261 to 92, and finished first in both major polls, released prior to the bowls.

Junior quarterback Pete Beathard completed 54 of 107 passes for 989 yards with ten touchdown passes and only one interception. (Bill Nelsen also completed 36 of 80 passes for 682 yards and eight touchdown passes with two interceptions.) Willie Brown was the team's leading rusher with 574 rushing yards (and 291 receiving yards). Hal Bedsole was USC's leading receiver with 33 catches for 827 yards and 11 touchdowns. Bedsole was inducted into the College Football Hall of Fame in 2012.

Two USC players were selected by the Associated Press (AP) for the All-Coast team; end Bedsole and linebacker Damon Bame. Bedsole was a consensus All-American in 1962, while Bame received first-team honors from the AP.

== Schedule ==
Date	Opponent	Rank	Site	Result	Attendance	Source
September 22	No. 8 Duke*		Los Angeles Memorial Coliseum; Los Angeles, CA	W 14–7	26,400	
September 29	at SMU*	No. 9	Cotton Bowl; Dallas, TX	W 33–3	14,000	
October 6	at Iowa*	No. 6	Iowa Stadium; Iowa City, IA	W 7–0	55,300	
October 20	California	No. 6	Los Angeles Memorial Coliseum; Los Angeles, CA	W 32–6	38,500	
October 27	at Illinois*	No. 4	Memorial Stadium; Champaign, IL	W 28–16	31,375	
November 3	No. 9 Washington^{†}	No. 3	Los Angeles Memorial Coliseum; Los Angeles, CA	W 14–0	46,456	
November 10	at Stanford	No. 2	Stanford Stadium; Stanford, CA (rivalry)	W 39–14	41,000	
November 17	Navy*	No. 2	Los Angeles Memorial Coliseum; Los Angeles, CA	W 13–6	51,701	
November 24	at UCLA	No. 1	Los Angeles Memorial Coliseum; Los Angeles, CA (Victory Bell)	W 14–3	86,740	
December 1	Notre Dame*	No. 1	Los Angeles Memorial Coliseum; Los Angeles, CA (rivalry)	W 25–0	81,676	
January 1, 1963	vs. No. 2 Wisconsin*	No. 1	Rose Bowl; Pasadena, CA (Rose Bowl)	W 42–37	98,698	
*Non-conference game; ^{†}Homecoming; Rankings from AP Poll released prior to the game; Source:

== Game summaries ==
=== Duke ===
#8 Duke at USC

Team	1	2	3	4	Total
No. 8 Blue Devils	7	0	0	0	7
• Trojans	0	14	0	0	14

- Date: September 22
- Location: Los Angeles Memorial Coliseum, Los Angeles
- Game attendance: 26,400

Scoring summary
1		DUKE	Jay Wilkinson 25-yard pass from Gil Garner (Reynolds kick)	DUKE 7-0
2		USC	Brown 4-yard pass from Beathard (Lupo kick)	Tied 7-7
2	1:30	USC	Hal Bedsole 51-yard pass from Bill Nelsen (Lupo kick)	USC 14-7

=== SMU ===
Statistics

- Receiving: Hal Bedsole 4 receptions, 112 yards, 2 TD

=== California ===
Statistics

- Receiving: Hal Bedsole 6 receptions, 201 yards, 2 TD

== Players ==
The following players were members of the 1962 USC football team.

- Damon Bame, linebacker
- Pete Beathard, quarterback
- Hal Bedsole, end
- Willie Brown, halfback
- John Brownwood, end
- Ron Butcher
- Mac Byrd
- Jay Clark
- Ken Del Conte, halfback
- Craig Fertig, quarterback
- Bill Fisk
- Mike Gale
- Stan Gonta
- Ron Heller
- Fred Hill
- Gary Hill, halfback
- Phil Hoover
- Hudson Houck, center
- Loran Hunt
- Tom Johnson
- Ernie Jones
- Randy Jones
- Gary Kirner, tackle
- Pete Lubisich, guard
- Tom Lupo
- Marv Marinovich, guard
- Rich McMahon
- Bill Nelsen, quarterback
- Gary Potter
- Ernie Pye
- John Ratliff, guard
- Lynn Reade
- Larry Sagouspe
- Armando Sanchez
- Denny Schmidt
- Ron Smedley
- Bob Svihus, tackle
- Toby Thurlow
- Gary Winslow
- Ben Wilson, fullback

== Coaching staff and administration ==
- Head coach: John McKay
- Assistant coaches: Mel Hein, Mike Giddings, Raymond George, Dave Levy, Charlie Hall, Marv Goux, and Joe Margucci
- Athletic director: Jess Hill
- Senior manager: Mike Leddel
- Assistant team manager: Bob Kardashian
