= 1962 Illinois Fighting Illini football team =

American college football season

1962 Illinois Fighting Illini football
- Conference: Big Ten Conference
- Record: 2–7 (2–5 Big Ten)
- Head coach: Pete Elliott (3rd season)
- MVP: Ken Zimmerman
- Captains: Bob Scharbert; Ken Zimmerman
- Home stadium: Memorial Stadium

1962 Big Ten Conference football standings
	Conf.					Overall
Team	W		L		T	W		L		T
No. 2 Wisconsin $	6	–	1	–	0	8	–	2	–	0
No. 10 Minnesota	5	–	2	–	0	6	–	2	–	1
Northwestern	4	–	2	–	0	7	–	2	–	0
Ohio State	4	–	2	–	0	6	–	3	–	0
Michigan State	3	–	3	–	0	5	–	4	–	0
Purdue	3	–	3	–	0	4	–	4	–	1
Iowa	3	–	3	–	0	4	–	5	–	0
Illinois	2	–	5	–	0	2	–	7	–	0
Indiana	1	–	5	–	0	3	–	6	–	0
Michigan	1	–	6	–	0	2	–	7	–	0
$ – Conference champion; Rankings from AP Poll

The 1962 Illinois Fighting Illini football team was an American football team that represented the University of Illinois as a member of the Big Ten Conference during the 1962 Big Ten season. In their third year under head coach Pete Elliott, the Fighting Illini compiled a 2–7 record (2–5 in conference games), finished in eighth place in the Big Ten, and were outscored by a total of 234 to 75.

The team's statistical leaders included quarterback Mike Taliaferro (1,139 passing yards, 37.7% completion percentage), halfback Ken Zimmerman (225 rushing yards, 4.1 yards per carry), and wide receiver Thurman Walker (240 receiving yars). Zimmerman was selected as the team's most valuable player. Center Dick Butkus was selected by the UPI as a second-team player on the 1962 All-Big Ten Conference football team.

The team played its home games at Memorial Stadium in Champaign, Illinois.

== Schedule ==
Date	Opponent	Site	Result	Attendance	Source
September 29	at Washington*	Husky Stadium; Seattle, WA	L 7–28	54,000	
October 6	at Northwestern	Dyche Stadium; Evanston, IL (rivalry)	L 0–45	41,854	
October 13	No. 10 Ohio State	Memorial Stadium; Champaign, IL (Illibuck)	L 15–51	56,017	
October 20	at Minnesota	Memorial Stadium; Minneapolis, MN	L 0–17	59,427	
October 27	No. 4 USC*	Memorial Stadium; Champaign, IL	L 16–28	31,375	
November 3	at Purdue	Ross–Ade Stadium; West Lafayette, IN (rivalry)	W 14–10	45,496	
November 10	at Michigan	Michigan Stadium; Ann Arbor, MI (rivalry)	L 10–14	49,756	
November 17	No. 4 Wisconsin	Memorial Stadium; Champaign, IL	L 6–35	36,762	
November 24	Michigan State	Memorial Stadium; Champaign, IL	W 7–6	19,547	
*Non-conference game; Rankings from AP Poll released prior to the game; Source:
