= 1962 Ohio State Buckeyes football team =

American college football season

1962 Ohio State Buckeyes football
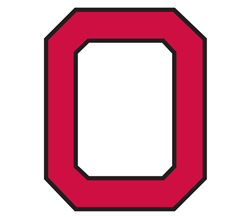
- Conference: Big Ten Conference

Ranking
- Coaches: No. 13
- Record: 6–3 (4–2 Big Ten)
- Head coach: Woody Hayes (12th season)
- MVP: Bill Armstrong
- Captains: Gary Moeller; Bob Vogel
- Home stadium: Ohio Stadium

1962 Big Ten Conference football standings
	Conf.					Overall
Team	W		L		T	W		L		T
No. 2 Wisconsin $	6	–	1	–	0	8	–	2	–	0
No. 10 Minnesota	5	–	2	–	0	6	–	2	–	1
Northwestern	4	–	2	–	0	7	–	2	–	0
Ohio State	4	–	2	–	0	6	–	3	–	0
Michigan State	3	–	3	–	0	5	–	4	–	0
Purdue	3	–	3	–	0	4	–	4	–	1
Iowa	3	–	3	–	0	4	–	5	–	0
Illinois	2	–	5	–	0	2	–	7	–	0
Indiana	1	–	5	–	0	3	–	6	–	0
Michigan	1	–	6	–	0	2	–	7	–	0
$ – Conference champion; Rankings from AP Poll

The 1962 Ohio State Buckeyes football team was an American football team that represented the Ohio State University as a member of the Big Ten Conference during the 1962 Big Ten season. In their 12th year under head coach Woody Hayes, the Buckeyes compiled a 6–3 record (4–2 in conference games), tied for third place in the Big Ten, and outscored opponents by a total of 205 to 98. Against ranked opponents, they lost to No. 8 Northwestern and defeated No. 5 Wisconsin. They were ranked No. 1 at the beginning of the season, but dropped out of the rankings on October 22 after losing a second game.

The team's statistical leaders included quarterback Joe Sparma (288 passing yards, 42.3% completion percentage), fullback David Francis (624 rushing yards, 5.2 yards per carry, seven touchdowns), and halfback Paul Warfield (eight receptions for 138 yards). Warfield and center Bill Armstrong received first-team honors on the 1962 All-Big Ten Conference football team.

The team played its home games at Ohio Stadium in Columbus, Ohio.

== Schedule ==
Date	Opponent	Rank	Site	Result	Attendance	Source
September 29	North Carolina*	No. 2	Ohio Stadium; Columbus, OH	W 41–7	84,009	
October 6	at UCLA*	No. 1	Los Angeles Memorial Coliseum; Los Angeles, CA	L 7–9	48,513	
October 13	at Illinois	No. 10	Memorial Stadium; Champaign, IL (Illibuck)	W 51–15	56,017	
October 20	No. 8 Northwestern	No. 6	Ohio Stadium; Columbus, OH	L 14–18	84,376	
October 27	No. 5 Wisconsin		Ohio Stadium; Columbus, OH	W 14–7	82,540	
November 3	at Iowa		Iowa Stadium; Iowa City, IA	L 14–28	58,400	
November 10	Indiana		Ohio Stadium; Columbus, OH	W 10–7	75,378	
November 17	Oregon*		Ohio Stadium; Columbus, OH	W 26–7	72,828	
November 24	Michigan		Ohio Stadium; Columbus, OH (rivalry)	W 28–0	82,349	
*Non-conference game; Rankings from AP Poll released prior to the game; Source:

== Game summaries ==
=== North Carolina ===
Team	1	2	3	4	Total
North Carolina	0	7	0	0	7
• Ohio St	7	7	14	13	41

- Date: September 29
- Location: Ohio Stadium, Columbus, Ohio
- Game attendance: 84,009
- Game weather: Clear, wind NW 12 mph, 62 °F (17 °C)

Scoring summary
Q1	5:09	OHST	Francis 1 yard run (Van Raaphorst kick)	OHST 7–0
Q2	14:20	OHST	Mummey 8 yard run (Van Raaphorst kick)	OHST 14–0
Q2	4:20	UNC	Edge 1 yard run (Edge kick)	OHST 14–7
Q3	3:42	OHST	Katterhenrich 1 yard run (Van Raaphorst kick)	OHST 21–7
Q3	0:24	OHST	Warfield 42 yard pass from Mummey (Van Raaphorst kick)	OHST 28–7
Q4	11:51	OHST	Warfield 4 yard run (Van Raaphorst kick)	OHST 35–7
Q4	5:15	OHST	Scott 7 yard run (kick failed)	OHST 41–7

John Mummey 15 Rush Att, 110 Yds, 1TD; 1/1 passing, 42 yards, 1 TD

=== UCLA ===
Team	1	2	3	4	Total
Ohio State	0	7	0	0	7
• UCLA	6	0	0	3	9

- Date: October 6
- Location: L.A. Coliseum, Los Angeles
- Game attendance: 48,513
- Game weather: Clear, 70 °F (21 °C)

Scoring summary
Q1	13:45	UCLA	Alexander 45 yard run (kick failed)	UCLA 0–6
Q2	13:37	OSU	Sparma 6 yard pass to Snell (Van Raaphorst kick)	OSU 7–6
Q4	1:34	UCLA	Zeno 24 yard field goal	UCLA 7–9

=== Illinois ===
Team	1	2	3	4	Total
• Ohio State	7	17	14	13	51
Illinois	0	7	0	8	15

- Date: October 13
- Location: Memorial Stadium, Champaign, Illinois
- Game attendance: 56,017
- Game weather: Humid, 77 °F (25 °C)

Scoring summary
Q1	4:03	OSU	Butts 2 yard run (Van Raaphorst kick)	OSU 7–0
Q2	14:10	ILL	Taliaferro 10 yard pass to Callaghan (Plankenhorn kick)	TIED 7–7
Q2	12:25	OSU	Mummey 10 yard run (Van Raaphorst kick)	OSU 14–7
Q2	7:31	OSU	Van Raaphorst 39 yard field goal	OSU 17–7
Q2	2:59	OSU	Francis 49 yard run (Van Raaphorst kick)	OSU 24–7
Q3	2:59	OSU	Mummey 3 yard run (Van Raaphorst kick)	OSU 31–7
Q3	0:05	OSU	Klein 66 yard run (Van Raaphorst kick)	OSU 38–7
Q4	9:19	OSU	Barnett 33 yard run (Van Raaphorst kick)	OSU 45–7
Q4	4:30	OSU	Francis 23 yard run (kick failed)	OSU 51–7
Q4	0:10	ILL	Taliaferro 90 yard pass to Yavorski (Taliferro run)	OSU 51–15

=== Northwestern ===
Team	1	2	3	4	Total
• Northwestern	0	12	0	6	18
Ohio State	14	0	0	0	14

- Date: October 20
- Location: Ohio Stadium, Columbus, Ohio
- Game attendance: 84,376
- Game weather: Cloudy, wind S 10-15 mph, 69 °F (21 °C)

Scoring summary
Q1	14:48	OSU	Klein 90 kickoff return (Van Raaphorst kick)	OSU 7–0
Q1	1:48	OSU	Francis 9 yard run (Van Raaphorst kick)	OSU 14–0
Q2	6:03	NW	Myers 8 yard pass to Flatley (kick failed)	OSU 14–6
Q2	0:51	NW	Swingle 1 yard run (pass failed)	OSU 14–12
Q4	5:38	NW	Murphy 1 yard run (kick failed)	NW 14–18

=== Wisconsin ===
Team	1	2	3	4	Total
Wisconsin	0	7	0	0	7
• Ohio State	7	0	0	7	14

- Date: October 27
- Location: Ohio Stadium
- Game attendance: 82,540
- Game weather: Cloudy, wind SSW 15 mph, 44 °F (7 °C)

Scoring summary
Q1	1:11	OSU	Sparma 21 yard pass to Warfield (Van Raaphorst kick)	OSU 7–0
Q2	5:31	WIS	Vander Kelen 47 yard pass to Scott (Kroner kick)	TIED 7–7
Q4	7:16	OSU	Mummey 1 yard run (Van Raaphorst kick)	OSU 14–7

=== Iowa ===
Team	1	2	3	4	Total
Ohio State	0	7	7	0	14
• Iowa	14	7	0	7	28

- Date: November 3
- Location: Iowa Stadium, Ames, Iowa
- Game attendance: 58,400
- Game weather: Cloudy, 44 °F (7 °C)

Scoring summary
Q1	5:00	IOWA	Grier 2 yard run (Roberts kick)	IOWA 0–7
Q1	2:40	IOWA	Szykowny 1 yard run (Roberts kick)	IOWA 0–14
Q2	14:28	OSU	Butts 1 yard run (Van Raaphorst kick)	IOWA 7–14
Q2	8:28	IOWA	Szykowny 1 yard run (Roberts kick)	IOWA 7–21
Q3	7:27	OSU	Katterhenrich 3 yard run (Van Raaphorst kick)	IOWA 14–21
Q4	1:32	IOWA	Sherman 1 yard run (Roberts kick)	IOWA 14–28

=== Indiana ===
Team	1	2	3	4	Total
Indiana	0	0	7	0	7
• Ohio State	0	7	0	3	10

- Date: November 10
- Location: Ohio Stadium
- Game attendance: 75,378
- Game weather: Rainy, wind 25 mph, 44 °F (7 °C)

Scoring summary
Q2	1:57	OSU	Warfield 75 yard run (Van Raaphorst kick)	OSU 7–0
Q3	5:28	IND	Moore 1 yard run (George kick)	TIED 7–7
Q4	0:08	OSU	Van Raaphorst26 yard field goal	OSU 10–7

=== Oregon ===
Team	1	2	3	4	Total
Oregon	0	7	0	0	7
• Ohio State	7	7	6	6	26

- Date: November 17
- Location: Ohio Stadium
- Game attendance: 72,828
- Game weather: Rainy, wind NW 10 mph, 39 °F (4 °C)

Scoring summary
Q1	6:48	OSU	Francis 8 yard run (Mamula kick)	OSU 7–0
Q2	6:34	OSU	Mrukowski 4 yard run (Mamula kick)	OSU 14–0
Q2	3:58	ORE	Berry 15 yard pass to Willner (Corey kick)	OSU 14–7
Q3	4:24	OSU	Mrukowski 4 yard rush (kick blocked)	OSU 20–7
Q4	10:30	OSU	Mamula 25 yard field goal	OSU 23–7
Q4	1:00	OSU	Mamula 40 yard field goal	OSU 26–7

=== Michigan ===
Team	1	2	3	4	Total
Michigan	0	0	0	0	0
• Ohio State	7	0	7	14	28

- Date: November 24
- Location: Ohio Stadium
- Game attendance: 82,349
- Game weather: Clear, wind ENE 8 mph, 40 °F (4 °C)

Scoring summary
Q1	4:42	OSU	Francis 1 yard run (Mamula kick)	OSU 7–0
Q3	4:46	OSU	Francis 3 yard run (Mamula kick)	OSU 14–0
Q4	13:17	OSU	Butts 1 yard run (Mamula kick)	OSU 21–0
Q4	7:34	OSU	Katterhenrich 6 yard run (Mamula kick)	OSU 28–0

== Coaching staff ==
- Woody Hayes – head coach – 12th year

== 1963 pro draftees ==
Player	Draft	Round	Pick	Position	NFL club
Bob Vogel	NFL	1	5	Tackle	Baltimore Colts
Bob Vogel	AFL	3	23	Tackle	Boston Patriots
Daryl Sanders	NFL	1	12	Tackle	Detroit Lions
Daryl Sanders	AFL	4	32	Tackle	Kansas City Chiefs
Gary Moeller	NFL	5	66	Guard	San Francisco 49ers
Dave Francis	NFL	7	91	Fullback	Washington Redskins
Rod Foster	AFL	8	62	Guard	Boston Patriots
Rod Foster	NFL	10	134	Guard	Washington Redskins
Dave Katterhenrich	NFL	13	177	Back	Cleveland Browns
Bob Middleton	AFL	23	180	End	Buffalo Bills
