= Daryl Sanders =

American football player (1941–2025)

No. 70
- Position: Offensive tackle

Personal information
- Born: April 24, 1941; Canton, Ohio, U.S.
- Died: October 5, 2025 (aged 84)
- Listed height: 6 ft 5 in (1.96 m)
- Listed weight: 250 lb (113 kg)

Career information
- High school: Mayfield (Mayfield, Ohio)
- College: Ohio State
- NFL draft: 1963: 1st round, 12th overall pick
- AFL draft: 1963: 4th round, 32nd overall pick

Career history
- Detroit Lions (1963–1966)

Awards and highlights
- National champion (1961)

Career NFL statistics
- Games played: 56
- Games started: 56
- Fumble recoveries: 4
- Stats at Pro Football Reference

Daryl Theodore Sanders (April 24, 1941 – October 5, 2025) was an American professional football player who played offensive tackle for four seasons for the Detroit Lions of the National Football League (NFL). He played college football for the Ohio State Buckeyes before he was selected by the Lions in the first round of the 1963 NFL draft with the 12th overall pick. A right tackle with the Buckeyes, he was the starting left tackle in each of his four years in Detroit. He retired after the 1966 season to accept a sales position in which he was paid a salary almost twice as much as he earned annually while playing in the NFL.

Sanders died from a heart attack on October 5, 2025, at the age of 84.
