= 1962 Minnesota Golden Gophers football team =

American college football season

1962 Minnesota Golden Gophers football
- Conference: Big Ten Conference

Ranking
- Coaches: No. 10
- AP: No. 10
- Record: 6–2–1 (5–2 Big Ten)
- Head coach: Murray Warmath (9th season)
- MVP: Bobby Bell
- Captain: Dick Enga
- Home stadium: Memorial Stadium

1962 Big Ten Conference football standings
	Conf.					Overall
Team	W		L		T	W		L		T
No. 2 Wisconsin $	6	–	1	–	0	8	–	2	–	0
No. 10 Minnesota	5	–	2	–	0	6	–	2	–	1
Northwestern	4	–	2	–	0	7	–	2	–	0
Ohio State	4	–	2	–	0	6	–	3	–	0
Michigan State	3	–	3	–	0	5	–	4	–	0
Purdue	3	–	3	–	0	4	–	4	–	1
Iowa	3	–	3	–	0	4	–	5	–	0
Illinois	2	–	5	–	0	2	–	7	–	0
Indiana	1	–	5	–	0	3	–	6	–	0
Michigan	1	–	6	–	0	2	–	7	–	0
$ – Conference champion; Rankings from AP Poll

The 1962 Minnesota Golden Gophers football team represented the University of Minnesota in the 1962 Big Ten Conference football season. In their ninth year under head coach Murray Warmath, the Golden Gophers compiled a 6–2–1 record and outscored their opponents by a combined total of 131 to 61. The team finished tenth in both the Associated Press and United Press International polls.

Tackle Bobby Bell received the team's Most Valuable Player award and the Outland Trophy. Bell, guard Julian Hook and end John Campbell were named All-Big Ten first team. Tackle Carl Eller and defensive end Bob Prawdzik were named All-Big Ten second team.

Total attendance at six home games was 377,744, an average of 62,957 per game. The largest crowd was against Purdue.

== Schedule ==
Date	Opponent	Rank	Site	Result	Attendance	Source
September 29	No. 10 Missouri*		Memorial Stadium; Minneapolis, MN	T 0–0	60,133	
October 6	Navy*		Memorial Stadium; Minneapolis, MN	W 21–0	64,364	
October 13	Northwestern		Memorial Stadium; Minneapolis, MN	L 22–34	61,652	
October 20	Illinois^{†}		Memorial Stadium; Minneapolis, MN	W 17–0	59,427	
October 27	at Michigan		Michigan Stadium; Ann Arbor, MI (Little Brown Jug)	W 17–0	65,484	
November 3	at No. 7 Michigan State		Spartan Stadium; East Lansing, MI	W 28–7	64,783	
November 10	Iowa	No. 10	Memorial Stadium; Minneapolis, MN (rivalry)	W 10–0	65,087	
November 17	Purdue	No. 8	Memorial Stadium; Minneapolis, MN	W 7–6	59,760	
November 24	at No. 3 Wisconsin	No. 5	Camp Randall Stadium; Madison, WI (rivalry)	L 9–14	65,514	
*Non-conference game; ^{†}Homecoming; Rankings from AP Poll released prior to the game; Source:

== Roster ==
1962 Minnesota Golden Gophers football team roster
Players
Coaches
Offense

Pos.	#	Name	Class

Defense

Pos.	#	Name	Class
DL	76	Carl Eller	Jr
DL	78	Bobby Bell	Sr

Special teams

Pos.	#	Name	Class

Head coach

- Murray Warmath

Coordinators/assistant coaches

Legend

- (C) Team captain
- (S) Suspended
- (I) Ineligible
- Injured
- Redshirt

== Game summaries ==
=== at No. 3 Wisconsin ===
No. 5 Minnesota at No. 3 Wisconsin

Team	1	2	3	4	Total
No. 5 Golden Gophers	0	6	3	0	9
• No. 3 Badgers	0	7	0	7	14

- Date: November 24, 1962
- Location: Camp Randall Stadium, Madison, Wisconsin
- Game attendance: 65,541
