= Pat Richter =

American football player and administrator (born 1941)

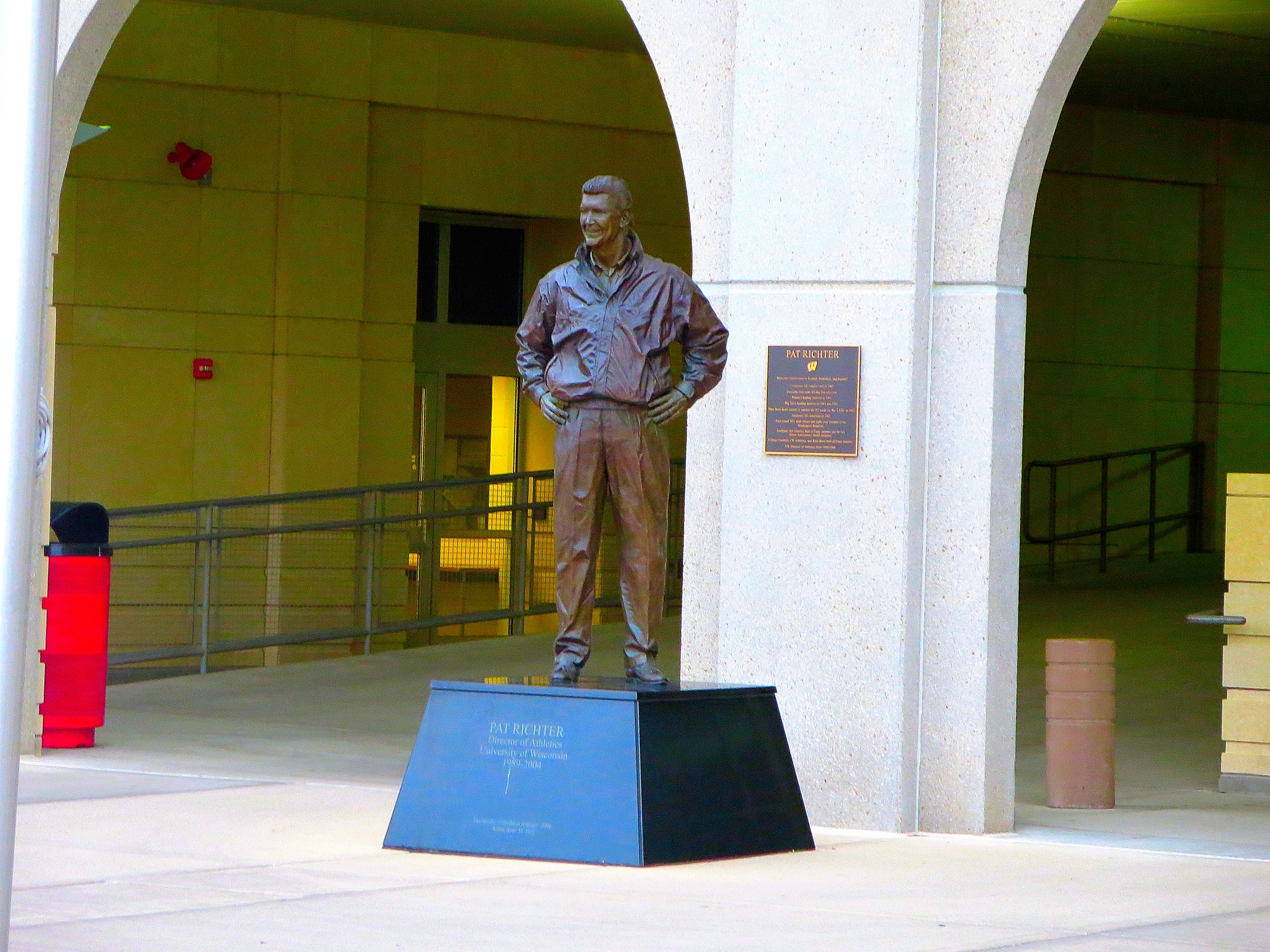

No. 88
- Positions: Tight end, Wide receiver, Punter

Personal information
- Born: September 9, 1941 (age 85); Madison, Wisconsin, U.S.
- Listed height: 6 ft 5 in (1.96 m)
- Listed weight: 229 lb (104 kg)

Career information
- High school: Madison East
- College: Wisconsin
- NFL draft: 1963: 1st round, 7th overall pick
- AFL draft: 1963: 10th round, 78th overall pick

Career history
- Washington Redskins (1963–1970); Dallas Cowboys (1971)*
- * Offseason or practice squad member only

Awards and highlights
- Consensus All-American (1962); First-team All-American (1961); 2× First-team All-Big Ten (1961–1962); Second-team All-Big Ten (1960); Wisconsin Badgers No. 88 retired

Career NFL statistics
- Receptions: 99
- Receiving yards: 1,315
- Receiving touchdowns: 14
- Stats at Pro Football Reference
- College Football Hall of Fame

Hugh Vernon "Pat" Richter (born September 9, 1941) is an American former professional football player and athletic administrator. He played professionally for the Washington Redskins of the National Football League (NFL) before becoming the athletic director at the University of Wisconsin–Madison. He was responsible for hiring Barry Alvarez from Notre Dame in 1990 as head football coach, restoring the Badgers football program to national prominence. He also hired basketball coaches Dick Bennett and Bo Ryan, both of whom reached the "Final Four" of the NCAA Tournament.

== Playing career ==
Richter was a nine-time letterman at the University of Wisconsin-Madison (the last person to earn such a distinction in school history). He lettered three times each in football, basketball, and baseball. He earned All-America (1961–62) and academic All-America (1962) honors as a tight end, led the Big Ten in receiving twice, and led the nation in receiving yards as a junior. Richter set a Rose Bowl record with 11 catches for 163 yards in the 1963 game vs. No. 1-rated USC Trojans. He also earned all-league honors in baseball as a first baseman. In 1963, he was awarded the Big Ten Medal of Honor, which recognizes one student from the graduating class of each Big Ten member school, for demonstrating joint athletic and academic excellence throughout their college career.

He was a first-round draft pick of the Washington Redskins in the 1963 NFL draft and went on to play eight seasons in Washington.

== Athletic director ==
Richter returned to the University of Wisconsin–Madison as athletic director in 1989 after 17 years service as Vice President of Personnel at Oscar Mayer Foods Corp., recruited by then-chancellor Donna Shalala. He inherited a program in disarray, with outmoded facilities, struggling teams, and a deficit of $2.1 million.

He made a priority of modernizing the sports facilities, including construction of the Kohl Center and renovations to Camp Randall Stadium. He reversed the financial fortunes of the department, erasing the deficit and building a budget reserve of $6.4 million.

When he stepped down as athletic director on April 1, 2004, he was the longest-tenured director of athletics in the Big Ten Conference with 14-plus years. He was succeeded by Alvarez.

== Legacy ==
Richter is a member of the College Football Hall of Fame, the Academic All-America Hall of Fame, the Rose Bowl Hall of Fame and the Wisconsin Athletic Hall of Fame. He was named to Sports Illustrated's NCAA Football All-Century Team.

Richter is a member of The Pigskin Club of Washington, D.C. National Intercollegiate All-American Football Players Honor Roll.

The University of Wisconsin–Madison twice honored Richter during the 2006 football season. On November 4, his number 88 was retired in a ceremony during that day's football game. On November 17 a bronze statue of Richter was unveiled in the Kellner Hall plaza immediately outside Camp Randall Stadium.
