= Dave Francis =

American football player (born 1941)

No. 39
- Position: Fullback

Personal information
- Born: April 15, 1941 (age 85); Columbus, Ohio, U.S.
- Listed height: 6 ft 1 in (1.85 m)
- Listed weight: 210 lb (95 kg)

Career information
- High school: West (Columbus)
- College: Ohio State (1959-1962)
- NFL draft: 1963: 7th round, 91st overall pick

Career history
- Washington Redskins (1963)
- Stats at Pro Football Reference

David Lee Francis (born April 15, 1941) is an American former professional football fullback for the Ohio State Buckeyes from 1960 to 1962. Highly recruited nationally as a fullback prospect from Columbus West High School, Francis chose to attend his hometown university after being recruited by Woody Hayes.

Playing behind College Hall of Famer Bob Ferguson for two years, and a backfield that included future Pro Football Hall of Famer Paul Warfield and future American Football League legend Matt Snell (AFL), Francis did not break into the starting lineup until his senior year. That year, Ohio State started out as the preseason AP #1 team in the country. Although close losses to UCLA and Northwestern derailed Ohio State's national championship hopes that season, Francis—in a backfield that still included Paul Warfield—led the team in rushing, averaging over 5 yds/carry. In 1962, David was the Big Ten rushing champion (5.2 yds per carry).

Francis' greatest achievement as an Ohio State football player was saved for his last game against arch-rival Michigan. Until the 2007 season, his 186-yard, two touchdown performance was the most yards gained by an Ohio State running back against Michigan.(Beanie Wells) Most noteworthy about that performance, is that Francis, under complete exhaustion, collapsed untouched near the goal line in an open field run before he could tally his third touchdown.

Drafted in the seventh round by the Washington Redskins, Francis played one year in the National Football League (NFL) before his career was ended by injury.
