= 1962 NCAA University Division football rankings =

- Season: 1962
- Bowl season: 1962–63 bowl games
- Preseason No. 1: Ohio State
- End of season champions: USC

Two human polls comprised the 1962 NCAA University Division football rankings. Unlike most sports, college football's governing body, the NCAA, does not bestow a national championship, instead that title is bestowed by one or more different polling agencies. There are two main weekly polls that begin in the preseason—the AP Poll and the Coaches Poll.

== Legend ==
	Increase in ranking
	Decrease in ranking
	Not ranked previous week
	National champion
(#–#)	Win–loss record
(Italics)	Number of first place votes
т	Tied with team above or below also with this symbol

== AP Poll ==
The final AP Poll was released on December 4, at the end of the 1962 regular season, weeks before the bowls. The poll ranked only the top ten teams from 1962 through 1967.

	Preseason Aug	Week 1 Sep 24	Week 2 Oct 1	Week 3 Oct 8	Week 4 Oct 15	Week 5 Oct 22	Week 6 Oct 29	Week 7 Nov 5	Week 8 Nov 12	Week 9 Nov 19	Week 10 Nov 26	Week 11 (Final) Dec 4	
1.	Ohio State (41)	Alabama (1–0) (14)	Ohio State (1–0) (18)	Alabama (3–0) (23)	Texas (4–0) (21)	Texas (5–0) (23)	Northwestern (5–0) (34)	Northwestern (6–0) (24)	Alabama (8–0) (22)	USC (8–0) (20)	USC (9–0) (19)	USC (10–0) (42)	1.
2.	Texas (1)	Ohio State (0–0) (19)	Alabama (2–0) (19)	Texas (3–0) (20)	Alabama (4–0) (24)	Alabama (5–0) (18)	Alabama (6–0) (15)	USC (6–0) (6)	USC (7–0) (17)	Ole Miss (8–0) (15)	Wisconsin (8–1) (9)	Wisconsin (8–1) (5)	2.
3.	Alabama (3)	Texas (1–0) (3)	Texas (2–0) (3)	Penn State (3–0) (3)	USC (3–0)	Northwestern (4–0) (8)	USC (5–0) (1)	Alabama (7–0) (9)	Ole Miss (7–0) (3)	Wisconsin (7–1) (7)	Ole Miss (8–0) (12)	Ole Miss (9–0) (2)	3.
4.	Michigan State (2)	Penn State (1–0) (3)	Penn State (2–0)	USC (3–0) (1)	LSU (3–0–1)	USC (4–0) (1)	LSU (5–0–1)	Ole Miss (6–0) (9)	Wisconsin (6–1) (8)	Texas (8–0–1) (3)	Texas (9–0–1)	Texas (9–0–1)	4.
5.	LSU	LSU (1–0)	Georgia Tech (2–0)	Ole Miss (3–0) (1)	Ole Miss (3–0)	Wisconsin (4–0) (1)	Texas (5–0–1)	Texas (6–0–1) (1)	Texas (7–0–1)	Minnesota (6–1–1) (1)	Alabama (8–1)	Alabama (9–1) (1)	5.
6.	Ole Miss (2)	Michigan State (0–0)	USC (2–0)	LSU (2–0–1)	Ohio State (2–1) (2)	LSU (4–0–1)	Ole Miss (5–0) (1)	Arkansas (6–1)	Missouri (7–0–1)	Alabama (8–1)	Arkansas (9–1)	Arkansas (9–1)	6.
7.	Purdue	Ole Miss (1–0) (1)	Ole Miss (2–0)	Washington (2–0–1)	Arkansas (4–0) (1)	Ole Miss (4–0)	Michigan State (4–1) (1)	Missouri (6–0–1)	Arkansas (7–1)	Arkansas (8–1)	LSU (8–1–1)	LSU (8–1–1)	7.
8.	Duke	Georgia Tech (1–0)	Washington (1–0–1)	Arkansas (3–0) (1)	Northwestern (3–0) (3)	Washington (4–0–1)	Arkansas (5–1)	Wisconsin (5–1)	Minnesota (5–1–1)	LSU (7–1–1)	Oklahoma (7–2)	Oklahoma (8–2)	8.
9.	Penn State	USC (1–0)	Miami (FL) (2–0)	Purdue (1–0–1)	Washington (3–0–1)	Arkansas (4–1)	Washington (4–0–2)	LSU (5–1–1)	Northwestern (6–1)	Penn State (8–1)	Penn State (9–1) (3)	Penn State (9–1) (2)	9.
10.	Washington	Missouri (1–0)	Army (2–0)	Ohio State (1–1)	Wisconsin (3–0)	Michigan State (3–1)	Auburn (5–0)	Minnesota (4–1–1)	LSU (6–1–1)	Oklahoma (6–2)	Minnesota (6–2–1)	Minnesota (6–2–1)	10.
	Preseason Aug	Week 1 Sep 24	Week 2 Oct 1	Week 3 Oct 8	Week 4 Oct 15	Week 5 Oct 22	Week 6 Oct 29	Week 7 Nov 5	Week 8 Nov 12	Week 9 Nov 19	Week 10 Nov 26	Week 11 (Final) Dec 4	
		Dropped: Purdue; Duke; Washington	Dropped: LSU; Michigan State; Missouri	Dropped: Georgia Tech; Miami (FL); Army	Dropped: Penn State; Purdue	Dropped: Ohio State	Dropped: Wisconsin	Dropped: Michigan State; Washington; Auburn	None	Dropped: Missouri; Northwestern	None	None	

== Final Coaches Poll ==
The final UPI Coaches Poll was released prior to the bowl games, on December 4.
USC received 31 of the 35 first-place votes; Wisconsin received two, Ole Miss one, and Texas one.

Ranking	Team	Conference	Record	Bowl
1	USC	AAWU	11–0	Won Rose, 42–37
2	Wisconsin	Big Ten	8–2	Lost Rose, 37–42
3	Ole Miss	SEC	10–0	Won Sugar, 17–13
4	Texas	Southwest	9–1–1	Lost Cotton, 0–13
5	Alabama	SEC	10–1	Won Orange, 17–0
6	Arkansas	Southwest	9–2	Lost Sugar, 13–17
7	Oklahoma	Big Eight	8–3	Lost Orange, 0–17
8	LSU	SEC	9–1–1	Won Cotton, 13–0
9	Penn State	Independent	9–2	Lost Gator, 7–17
10	Minnesota	Big Ten	6–2–1	none
11	Georgia Tech	SEC	7–3–1	Lost Bluebonnet, 10–14
12	Missouri	Big Eight	8–1–2	Won Bluebonnet, 14–10
13	Ohio State	Big Ten	6–3	none
14	Duke	ACC	8–2	none
14	Washington	AAWU	7–1–2	none
16	Northwestern	Big Ten	7–2	none
16	Oregon State	Independent	9–2	Won Liberty, 6–0
18	Arizona State	WAC	7–2–1	none
18	Illinois	Big Ten	2–7	none
18	Miami (FL)	Independent	7–4	Lost Gotham, 34–36

- Prior to the 1975 season, the Big Ten and AAWU (later Pac-8) conferences allowed only one postseason participant each, for the Rose Bowl.
