= List of California Collegiate Athletic Association football standings =

This is a list of yearly California Collegiate Athletic Association football standings.

== CCAA standings ==
1939 California Collegiate Athletic Association football standings
	Conf.					Overall
Team	W		L		T	W		L		T
San Jose State $	3	–	0	–	0	13	–	0	–	0
Fresno State	1	–	1	–	0	10	–	1	–	0
Santa Barbara State	1	–	2	–	0	5	–	4	–	1
San Diego State	0	–	2	–	0	2	–	7	–	0
$ – Conference champion

1940 California Collegiate Athletic Association football standings
	Conf.					Overall
Team	W		L		T	W		L		T
San Jose State $	3	–	0	–	0	11	–	1	–	0
Fresno State	1	–	1	–	1	9	–	2	–	1
San Diego State	1	–	1	–	1	5	–	3	–	1
Santa Barbara State	0	–	3	–	0	5	–	5	–	0
$ – Conference champion

1941 California Collegiate Athletic Association football standings
	Conf.					Overall
Team	W		L		T	W		L		T
San Jose State +	2	–	0	–	1	5	–	3	–	3
Fresno State +	2	–	0	–	1	4	–	3	–	2
Santa Barbara State	1	–	2	–	0	3	–	5	–	1
San Diego State	0	–	3	–	0	6	–	4	–	0
+ – Conference co-champions

1946 California Collegiate Athletic Association football standings
	Conf.					Overall
Team	W		L		T	W		L		T
San Jose State $	4	–	0	–	0	9	–	1	–	1
Fresno State	2	–	2	–	0	8	–	4	–	0
San Diego State	2	–	2	–	0	6	–	4	–	0
Pacific (CA)	2	–	2	–	0	4	–	7	–	0
Santa Barbara	0	–	4	–	0	2	–	6	–	0
$ – Conference champion

1947 California Collegiate Athletic Association football standings
	Conf.					Overall
Team	W		L		T	W		L		T
Pacific (CA) $	5	–	0	–	0	10	–	1	–	0
San Jose State	3	–	2	–	0	9	–	3	–	0
Fresno State	2	–	1	–	2	3	–	6	–	2
San Diego State	2	–	2	–	1	7	–	3	–	1
Santa Barbara	1	–	3	–	1	4	–	3	–	1
Cal Poly	0	–	5	–	0	1	–	9	–	0
$ – Conference champion

1948 California Collegiate Athletic Association football standings
	Conf.					Overall
Team	W		L		T	W		L		T
San Jose State $	5	–	0	–	0	9	–	3	–	0
Pacific (CA)	4	–	1	–	0	7	–	1	–	2
Santa Barbara	2	–	3	–	0	6	–	5	–	0
Fresno State	2	–	3	–	0	3	–	6	–	1
San Diego State	1	–	4	–	0	4	–	7	–	0
Cal Poly	1	–	4	–	0	3	–	5	–	0
$ – Conference champion

1949 California Collegiate Athletic Association football standings
	Conf.					Overall
Team	W		L		T	W		L		T
San Jose State $	4	–	0	–	0	9	–	4	–	0
San Diego State	3	–	1	–	0	6	–	3	–	0
Cal Poly	1	–	3	–	0	4	–	6	–	0
Fresno State	1	–	3	–	0	3	–	8	–	0
Santa Barbara	1	–	3	–	0	2	–	7	–	0
$ – Conference champion

1950 California Collegiate Athletic Association football standings
	Conf.					Overall
Team	W		L		T	W		L		T
San Diego State $	3	–	0	–	1	5	–	3	–	1
Santa Barbara	3	–	1	–	0	7	–	3	–	0
Pepperdine	2	–	2	–	0	4	–	5	–	0
Fresno State	1	–	2	–	1	2	–	6	–	1
Cal Poly	0	–	4	–	0	3	–	7	–	0
$ – Conference champion

1951 California Collegiate Athletic Association football standings
	Conf.					Overall
Team	W		L		T	W		L		T
San Diego State $	4	–	0	–	0	10	–	0	–	1
Cal Poly	2	–	1	–	1	5	–	4	–	1
Pepperdine	2	–	1	–	1	5	–	4	–	1
Santa Barbara	1	–	3	–	0	5	–	4	–	0
Los Angeles State	0	–	4	–	0	1	–	7	–	0
$ – Conference champion

1952 California Collegiate Athletic Association football standings
	Conf.					Overall
Team	W		L		T	W		L		T
Cal Poly $	4	–	0	–	0	7	–	3	–	0
Santa Barbara	3	–	1	–	0	8	–	2	–	0
San Diego State	2	–	2	–	0	4	–	5	–	0
Los Angeles State	1	–	3	–	0	4	–	4	–	0
Pepperdine	0	–	4	–	0	2	–	7	–	0
$ – Conference champion

1953 California Collegiate Athletic Association football standings
	Conf.					Overall
Team	W		L		T	W		L		T
Cal Poly $	5	–	0	–	0	9	–	0	–	0
San Diego State	3	–	1	–	1	5	–	3	–	1
Fresno State	2	–	2	–	1	4	–	4	–	2
Pepperdine	2	–	3	–	0	3	–	6	–	0
Santa Barbara	1	–	4	–	0	2	–	6	–	1
Los Angeles State	1	–	4	–	0	2	–	7	–	0
$ – Conference champion

1954 California Collegiate Athletic Association football standings
	Conf.					Overall
Team	W		L		T	W		L		T
Fresno State $	4	–	0	–	0	7	–	3	–	0
Cal Poly	3	–	1	–	0	6	–	4	–	0
San Diego State	2	–	2	–	0	5	–	4	–	0
Santa Barbara	1	–	3	–	0	4	–	5	–	0
Los Angeles State	0	–	4	–	0	2	–	6	–	1
Pepperdine *	0	–	0	–	0	6	–	2	–	0
$ – Conference champion; Pepperdine had a record of 1–2 against conference opponents, but those games did not count in the CCAA standings.

1955 California Collegiate Athletic Association football standings
	Conf.					Overall
Team	W		L		T	W		L		T
Fresno State $	2	–	0	–	0	9	–	1	–	0
Cal Poly	1	–	1	–	0	7	–	3	–	0
San Diego State	0	–	2	–	0	2	–	8	–	0
$ – Conference champion

1956 California Collegiate Athletic Association football standings
	Conf.					Overall
Team	W		L		T	W		L		T
Fresno State	2	–	0	–	0	8	–	2	–	0
San Diego State	2	–	1	–	0	4	–	3	–	2
Santa Barbara	2	–	1	–	0	5	–	5	–	0
Los Angeles State	1	–	1	–	0	3	–	5	–	1
Cal Poly	1	–	2	–	0	7	–	3	–	0
Long Beach State	0	–	3	–	0	3	–	5	–	0
No champion named for the 1956 season

1957 California Collegiate Athletic Association football standings
	Conf.					Overall
Team	W		L		T	W		L		T
Cal Poly $	3	–	0	–	0	8	–	1	–	0
UC Santa Barbara	2	–	1	–	0	6	–	2	–	0
Fresno State	1	–	1	–	0	5	–	5	–	0
Los Angeles State	1	–	1	–	0	5	–	4	–	0
San Diego State	0	–	1	–	0	2	–	7	–	0
Long Beach State	0	–	3	–	0	3	–	5	–	0
$ – Conference champion; The conference championship was unofficial because the six CCAA members did not play a full conference schedule.

1958 California Collegiate Athletic Association football standings
	Conf.					Overall
Team	W		L		T	W		L		T
No. 15 Cal Poly +	4	–	1	–	0	9	–	1	–	0
Fresno State +	4	–	1	–	0	5	–	5	–	0
UC Santa Barbara	3	–	2	–	0	4	–	4	–	1
San Diego State	2	–	3	–	0	3	–	5	–	0
Long Beach State	1	–	3	–	1	2	–	6	–	1
Los Angeles State	0	–	4	–	1	4	–	4	–	1
+ – Conference co-champions; Rankings from UPI small college poll

1959 California Collegiate Athletic Association football standings
	Conf.					Overall
Team	W		L		T	W		L		T
Fresno State $	5	–	0	–	0	7	–	3	–	0
Los Angeles State	3	–	2	–	0	7	–	3	–	0
Cal Poly	3	–	2	–	0	6	–	3	–	0
UC Santa Barbara	2	–	3	–	0	6	–	4	–	0
Long Beach State	2	–	3	–	0	4	–	5	–	0
San Diego State	0	–	5	–	0	1	–	6	–	1
$ – Conference champion

1960 California Collegiate Athletic Association football standings
	Conf.					Overall
Team	W		L		T	W		L		T
No. 9 Fresno State $	5	–	0	–	0	9	–	1	–	0
Long Beach State	3	–	1	–	1	5	–	3	–	1
Los Angeles State	3	–	1	–	1	4	–	3	–	1
UC Santa Barbara	2	–	3	–	0	2	–	5	–	1
Cal Poly	1	–	4	–	0	1	–	5	–	0
San Diego State	0	–	5	–	0	1	–	6	–	1
$ – Conference champion; Cal Poly forfeited cancelled conference games to Los Angeles State and UC Santa Barbara, but this forfeit did not affect overall records of the teams.; Rankings from UPI small college poll

1961 California Collegiate Athletic Association football standings
	Conf.					Overall
Team	W		L		T	W		L		T
No. 3/5 Fresno State $	5	–	0	–	0	10	–	0	–	0
Cal Poly	3	–	2	–	0	4	–	4	–	0
San Diego State	2	–	2	–	1	7	–	2	–	1
Los Angeles State	2	–	2	–	1	4	–	4	–	1
Long Beach State	2	–	3	–	0	5	–	5	–	0
UC Santa Barbara	0	–	5	–	0	2	–	8	–	0
$ – Conference champion; Rankings from AP/UPI small college polls

1962 California Collegiate Athletic Association football standings
	Conf.					Overall
Team	W		L		T	W		L		T
San Diego State $	5	–	0	–	0	8	–	2	–	0
Fresno State	4	–	1	–	0	7	–	3	–	0
Long Beach State	2	–	3	–	0	5	–	5	–	0
Cal Poly	2	–	3	–	0	4	–	5	–	0
UC Santa Barbara	2	–	3	–	0	2	–	8	–	0
Los Angeles State	0	–	5	–	0	2	–	8	–	0
Valley State	0	–	0	–	0	3	–	6	–	0
$ – Conference champion; Games with Valley State did not count in the conference standings.

1963 California Collegiate Athletic Association football standings
	Conf.					Overall
Team	W		L		T	W		L		T
Los Angeles State $	3	–	1	–	0	7	–	1	–	0
No. 7 San Diego State	3	–	1	–	0	7	–	2	–	0
Long Beach State	2	–	2	–	0	5	–	5	–	0
Fresno State	2	–	2	–	0	4	–	6	–	0
Cal Poly	0	–	4	–	0	2	–	8	–	0
Valley State	0	–	0	–	0	2	–	6	–	0
$ – Conference champion; Los Angeles State was the conference championship by virtue of its head to head win over San Diego State. Games with Valley State did not count in the conference standings.; Rankings from UPI small college poll

1964 California Collegiate Athletic Association football standings
	Conf.					Overall
Team	W		L		T	W		L		T
No.3/1 Cal St Los Angeles $	5	–	0	–	0	9	–	0	–	0
No.5/7 San Diego State	4	–	1	–	0	8	–	2	–	0
Long Beach State	3	–	2	–	0	8	–	2	–	0
Fresno State	1	–	3	–	0	4	–	6	–	0
Valley State	1	–	3	–	0	4	–	6	–	0
Cal Poly	0	–	5	–	0	0	–	10	–	0
$ – Conference champion; Rankings from AP/UPI small college polls

1965 California Collegiate Athletic Association football standings
	Conf.					Overall
Team	W		L		T	W		L		T
No. 4/2 Cal St Los Angeles $	5	–	0	–	0	9	–	1	–	0
No. NR/9 Long Beach State	4	–	1	–	0	9	–	1	–	0
San Diego State	3	–	2	–	0	8	–	2	–	0
Fresno State	1	–	3	–	0	6	–	4	–	0
Cal Poly	1	–	4	–	0	2	–	8	–	0
Valley State	0	–	4	–	0	1	–	9	–	0
$ – Conference champion; Rankings from AP/UPI small college polls

1966 California Collegiate Athletic Association football standings
	Conf.					Overall
Team	W		L		T	W		L		T
No. 1/1 San Diego State $	5	–	0	–	0	11	–	0	–	0
Fresno State	3	–	2	–	0	7	–	3	–	0
Long Beach State	3	–	2	–	0	6	–	3	–	0
Cal Poly	2	–	3	–	0	6	–	4	–	0
Cal State Los Angeles	2	–	3	–	0	4	–	6	–	0
Valley State	0	–	5	–	0	2	–	7	–	1
$ – Conference champion; Rankings from AP/UPI small college polls

1967 California Collegiate Athletic Association football standings
	Conf.					Overall
Team	W		L		T	W		L		T
No. 1/1 San Diego State $	5	–	0	–	0	10	–	1	–	0
Valley State	3	–	2	–	0	6	–	4	–	0
Long Beach State	3	–	2	–	0	5	–	5	–	0
Fresno State	3	–	2	–	0	3	–	8	–	0
Cal Poly	1	–	4	–	0	3	–	7	–	0
Cal State Los Angeles	0	–	5	–	0	1	–	9	–	0
$ – Conference champion; Rankings from AP/UPI small college polls

1968 California Collegiate Athletic Association football standings
	Conf.					Overall
Team	W		L		T	W		L		T
No. 18 Fresno State $	4	–	0	–	0	7	–	4	–	0
Cal Poly	2	–	2	–	0	7	–	3	–	0
Cal State Los Angeles	2	–	2	–	0	6	–	3	–	0
Valley State	1	–	3	–	0	5	–	4	–	0
Long Beach State	1	–	3	–	0	3	–	7	–	0
$ – Conference champion; Rankings from UPI small college poll

1969 California Collegiate Athletic Association football standings
	Conf.					Overall
Team	W		L		T	W		L		T
Cal Poly $	2	–	0	–	0	6	–	4	–	0
Valley State	1	–	1	–	0	4	–	5	–	0
Cal Poly Pomona	1	–	2	–	0	2	–	8	–	0
UC Riverside	0	–	1	–	0	3	–	6	–	0
$ – Conference champion

1970 California Collegiate Athletic Association football standings
	Conf.					Overall
Team	W		L		T	W		L		T
No. 20 Cal Poly $	3	–	0	–	0	8	–	2	–	0
Cal State Fullerton	3	–	1	–	0	6	–	4	–	1
Valley State	1	–	2	–	0	4	–	6	–	0
Cal Poly Pomona	1	–	3	–	0	5	–	5	–	0
UC Riverside	0	–	2	–	0	4	–	6	–	0
$ – Conference champion; Rankings from UPI small college poll

1971 California Collegiate Athletic Association football standings
	Conf.					Overall
Team	W		L		T	W		L		T
Cal Poly $	3	–	0	–	0	6	–	5	–	0
Cal State Fullerton	3	–	1	–	0	7	–	4	–	0
Valley State	1	–	2	–	0	4	–	7	–	0
Cal Poly Pomona	1	–	3	–	0	6	–	5	–	0
UC Riverside	0	–	2	–	0	2	–	7	–	1
$ – Conference champion

1972 California Collegiate Athletic Association football standings
	Conf.					Overall
Team	W		L		T	W		L		T
No. 3/3 Cal Poly +	3	–	0	–	0	8	–	1	–	1
UC Riverside +	3	–	0	–	0	9	–	1	–	0
Cal State Fullerton	2	–	2	–	0	7	–	4	–	0
Cal State Northridge	1	–	3	–	0	6	–	5	–	0
Cal Poly Pomona	0	–	4	–	0	4	–	6	–	0
+ – Conference co-champions; Rankings from AP/UPI small college polls

1973 California Collegiate Athletic Association football standings
	Conf.					Overall
Team	W		L		T	W		L		T
No. 8/9 Cal Poly $	4	–	0	–	0	9	–	1	–	0
UC Riverside	3	–	1	–	0	8	–	2	–	0
Cal State Fullerton	1	–	3	–	0	7	–	4	–	0
Cal Poly Pomona	1	–	3	–	0	4	–	6	–	1
Cal State Northridge	1	–	3	–	0	2	–	9	–	0
$ – Conference champion; Rankings from AP/UPI small college polls

1974 California Collegiate Athletic Association football standings
	Conf.					Overall
Team	W		L		T	W		L		T
UC Riverside $	4	–	0	–	0	8	–	3	–	0
Cal Poly	2	–	1	–	1	5	–	4	–	1
Cal Poly Pomona	1	–	1	–	2	5	–	3	–	2
Cal State Northridge	1	–	3	–	0	2	–	9	–	0
Cal State Los Angeles	0	–	3	–	1	5	–	4	–	1
$ – Conference champion

1975 California Collegiate Athletic Association football standings
	Conf.					Overall
Team	W		L		T	W		L		T
UC Riverside $	4	–	0	–	0	7	–	3	–	0
Cal Poly	3	–	1	–	0	6	–	4	–	0
Cal Poly Pomona	2	–	2	–	0	6	–	4	–	1
Cal State Northridge	1	–	3	–	0	4	–	6	–	1
Cal State Los Angeles	0	–	4	–	0	1	–	7	–	1
$ – Conference champion

1976 California Collegiate Athletic Association football standings
	Conf.					Overall
Team	W		L		T	W		L		T
Cal Poly $	2	–	0	–	0	7	–	1	–	1
Cal Poly Pomona	1	–	1	–	0	4	–	5	–	1
Cal State Northridge	1	–	2	–	0	8	–	3	–	0
Cal State Los Angeles	0	–	1	–	0	5	–	3	–	1
$ – Conference champion

1977 California Collegiate Athletic Association football standings
	Conf.					Overall
Team	W		L		T	W		L		T
Cal Poly $	2	–	0	–	0	6	–	4	–	0
Cal State Northridge	1	–	1	–	0	7	–	3	–	1
Cal Poly Pomona	0	–	2	–	0	2	–	8	–	0
Cal State Los Angeles	0	–	0	–	0	4	–	5	–	0
$ – Conference champion

1978 California Collegiate Athletic Association football standings
	Conf.					Overall
Team	W		L		T	W		L		T
No. 8 Cal Poly $^	2	–	0	–	0	7	–	3	–	0
Cal Poly Pomona	1	–	1	–	0	3	–	7	–	0
Cal State Northridge	0	–	2	–	0	5	–	5	–	0
$ – Conference champion; ^ – NCAA Division II playoff participant; The conference championship was unofficial because the CCAA had only three members.; Rankings from Associated Press poll

1979 California Collegiate Athletic Association football standings
	Conf.					Overall
Team	W		L		T	W		L		T
No. 7 Cal Poly $	2	–	0	–	0	7	–	3	–	0
Cal State Northridge	1	–	1	–	0	3	–	7	–	0
Cal Poly Pomona	0	–	2	–	0	0	–	11	–	0
$ – Conference champion; Rankings from NCAA Division II AP Poll

1980 California Collegiate Athletic Association football standings
	Conf.					Overall
Team	W		L		T	W		L		T
No. 3 Cal Poly $^	2	–	0	–	0	10	–	3	–	0
Cal State Northridge	1	–	1	–	0	5	–	6	–	0
Cal Poly Pomona	0	–	2	–	0	3	–	7	–	0
$ – Conference champion; ^ – NCAA Division II playoff participant; Rankings from Associated Press poll

1981 California Collegiate Athletic Association football standings
	Conf.					Overall
Team	W		L		T	W		L		T
Cal State Northridge $	2	–	0	–	0	6	–	4	–	1
Cal Poly Pomona	1	–	1	–	0	4	–	7	–	0
Cal Poly	0	–	2	–	0	4	–	5	–	0
$ – Conference champion
