= 1962 Hawaii Rainbows football team =

American college football season

1962 Hawaii Rainbows football
- Conference: Independent
- Record: 6–2
- Head coach: Jim Asato (1st season)
- Home stadium: Honolulu Stadium

1962 NCAA College Division independents football records
	Conf.			Overall
Team	W	L	T	W		L		T
Cal Poly Pomona		–		9	–	1	–	0
Southern Miss		–		9	–	1	–	0
Drake		–		8	–	2	–	0
Howard (AL)		–		7	–	2	–	0
Southern Connecticut State		–		7	–	2	–	0
St. Norbert		–		7	–	2	–	0
Hawaii		–		6	–	2	–	0
Montana State		–		7	–	3	–	0
Arkansas State		–		6	–	3	–	0
Northern Michigan		–		6	–	3	–	0
Northeastern		–		5	–	3	–	0
Wabash		–		5	–	3	–	1
Abilene Christian		–		6	–	4	–	0
East Carolina		–		5	–	4	–	0
Weber State		–		5	–	4	–	0
Wheaton (IL)		–		5	–	4	–	0
Chattanooga		–		5	–	5	–	0
Arlington State		–		4	–	6	–	0
Southern Illinois		–		4	–	6	–	0
Findlay		–		4	–	5	–	0
Tampa		–		3	–	4	–	2
UC Riverside		–		3	–	5	–	0
Idaho State		–		3	–	6	–	0
Eastern Michigan		–		2	–	5	–	0
Mississippi Vocational		–		2	–	5	–	0
Santa Clara		–		2	–	6	–	0
Carnegie Tech		–		1	–	7	–	0
Rose Poly		–		1	–	7	–	0
Union (NY)		–		1	–	7	–	0
Trinity (TX)		–		1	–	8	–	0

The 1962 Hawaii Rainbows football team represented the University of Hawaiʻi at Mānoa as an independent during the 1962 NCAA College Division football season. In their first season under head coach Jim Asato, the Rainbows compiled a 6–2 record. This marked the return of varsity football at the university after a team was not fielded for the 1961 season.

== Schedule ==
Date	Opponent	Site	Result	Attendance	Source
September 12	Hawaii Old Timers	Honolulu Stadium; Honolulu, HI	W 19–14	4,006	
September 22	at Cal Western	San Diego, CA	W 14–8	6,000	
September 29	at Los Angeles State	L.A. State Stadium; Los Angeles, CA	L 6–10	3,267–6,000	
October 17	Kaimuki Spartans	Honolulu Stadium; Honolulu, HI	W 27–0	1,039	
October 31	Tantalus Rangers	Honolulu Stadium; Honolulu, HI	W 13–0	2,000	
November 7	Waikiki Surfers	Honolulu Stadium; Honolulu, HI	W 19–0	2,000	
November 24	Willamette^{†}	Honolulu Stadium; Honolulu, HI	W 14–12	12,038	
November 30	San Jose State	Honolulu Stadium; Honolulu, HI (rivalry)	L 0–19	13,547–16,500	
^{†}Homecoming
