= 1962 Eastern Michigan Hurons football team =

American college football season

1962 Eastern Michigan Hurons football
- Conference: Independent
- Record: 2–5
- Head coach: Fred Trosko (11th season)
- Captains: Al Vadasay; Leroy Fahle
- Home stadium: Briggs Field

1962 NCAA College Division independents football records
	Conf.			Overall
Team	W	L	T	W		L		T
Cal Poly Pomona		–		9	–	1	–	0
Southern Miss		–		9	–	1	–	0
Drake		–		8	–	2	–	0
Howard (AL)		–		7	–	2	–	0
Southern Connecticut State		–		7	–	2	–	0
St. Norbert		–		7	–	2	–	0
Hawaii		–		6	–	2	–	0
Montana State		–		7	–	3	–	0
Arkansas State		–		6	–	3	–	0
Northern Michigan		–		6	–	3	–	0
Northeastern		–		5	–	3	–	0
Wabash		–		5	–	3	–	1
Abilene Christian		–		6	–	4	–	0
East Carolina		–		5	–	4	–	0
Weber State		–		5	–	4	–	0
Wheaton (IL)		–		5	–	4	–	0
Chattanooga		–		5	–	5	–	0
Arlington State		–		4	–	6	–	0
Southern Illinois		–		4	–	6	–	0
Findlay		–		4	–	5	–	0
Tampa		–		3	–	4	–	2
UC Riverside		–		3	–	5	–	0
Idaho State		–		3	–	6	–	0
Eastern Michigan		–		2	–	5	–	0
Mississippi Vocational		–		2	–	5	–	0
Santa Clara		–		2	–	6	–	0
Carnegie Tech		–		1	–	7	–	0
Rose Poly		–		1	–	7	–	0
Union (NY)		–		1	–	7	–	0
Trinity (TX)		–		1	–	8	–	0

The 1962 Eastern Michigan Hurons football team represented Eastern Michigan University as an independent during the 1962 NCAA College Division football season. In their 11th season under head coach Fred Trosko, the Hurons compiled a 2–5 record and were outscored by their opponents, 90 to 75. The team's two victories were against Eastern Illinois University and Alma College. Al Vadasay and Leroy Fahle were the team captains.

== Schedule ==
Date	Opponent	Site	Result	Attendance	Source
September 21	Ball State	Briggs Field; Ypsilanti, MI	L 0–14	3,500	
September 28	Kalamazoo	Briggs Field; Ypsilanti, MI	L 6–13	3,000	
October 6	at Illinois State Normal	McCormick Field; Normal, IL	L 19–20		
October 13	at Baldwin–Wallace	Berea, OH	L 15–27		
October 20	at Central Michigan	Alumni Field; Mount Pleasant, MI (rivalry)	L 0–24	4,000	
October 27	Eastern Illinois^{†}	Briggs Field; Ypsilanti, MI	W 14–0		
November 10	Alma	Briggs Field; Ypsilanti, MI	W 30–6		
^{†}Homecoming

== See also ==
- 1962 in Michigan
