= 1962 Drake Bulldogs football team =

American college football season

1962 Drake Bulldogs football
- Conference: Independent
- Record: 8–2
- Head coach: Bus Mertes (3rd season)
- Home stadium: Drake Stadium

1962 NCAA College Division independents football records
	Conf.			Overall
Team	W	L	T	W		L		T
Cal Poly Pomona		–		9	–	1	–	0
Southern Miss		–		9	–	1	–	0
Drake		–		8	–	2	–	0
Howard (AL)		–		7	–	2	–	0
Southern Connecticut State		–		7	–	2	–	0
St. Norbert		–		7	–	2	–	0
Hawaii		–		6	–	2	–	0
Montana State		–		7	–	3	–	0
Arkansas State		–		6	–	3	–	0
Northern Michigan		–		6	–	3	–	0
Northeastern		–		5	–	3	–	0
Wabash		–		5	–	3	–	1
Abilene Christian		–		6	–	4	–	0
East Carolina		–		5	–	4	–	0
Weber State		–		5	–	4	–	0
Wheaton (IL)		–		5	–	4	–	0
Chattanooga		–		5	–	5	–	0
Arlington State		–		4	–	6	–	0
Southern Illinois		–		4	–	6	–	0
Findlay		–		4	–	5	–	0
Tampa		–		3	–	4	–	2
UC Riverside		–		3	–	5	–	0
Idaho State		–		3	–	6	–	0
Eastern Michigan		–		2	–	5	–	0
Mississippi Vocational		–		2	–	5	–	0
Santa Clara		–		2	–	6	–	0
Carnegie Tech		–		1	–	7	–	0
Rose Poly		–		1	–	7	–	0
Union (NY)		–		1	–	7	–	0
Trinity (TX)		–		1	–	8	–	0

The 1962 Drake Bulldogs football team was an American football team that represented Drake University as an independent during the 1962 NCAA College Division football season. In its third season under head coach Bus Mertes, the team compiled a 8–2 record and outscored all opponents by a total of 204 to 108. The team played its home games at Drake Stadium in Des Moines, Iowa.

== Schedule ==
Date	Opponent	Site	Result	Attendance	Source
September 15	at Iowa State	Clyde Williams Field; Ames, IA	L 7–14	21,781	
September 22	Southern Illinois	Drake Stadium; Des Moines, IA	W 14–13	7,500	
September 29	Colorado State–Greeley	Drake Stadium; Des Moines, IA	W 21–0	5,000	
October 6	at South Dakota	Inman Field; Vermillion, SD	W 15–14	1,500	
October 13	at State College of Iowa	O. R. Latham Stadium; Cedar Falls, IA	W 21–15	6,800	
October 20	Wichita	Drake Stadium; Des Moines, IA	W 10–0	7,500	
October 26	at Bradley	Peoria, IL	W 30–13	6,000	
November 3	at Idaho State	Spud Bowl; Pocatello, ID	L 14–33	4,600	
November 10	North Dakota State	Drake Stadium; Des Moines, IA	W 40–6	4,000	
November 17	at Evansville	Evansville, IN	W 32–0	500	
