= 1962 Southern Miss Southerners football team =

American college football season

1962 Southern Miss Southerners football

UPI small college national champion
- Conference: Independent
- Record: 9–1
- Head coach: Thad Vann (14th season)
- Captains: Harold Hays; Johnny Sklopan
- Home stadium: Faulkner Field

1962 NCAA College Division independents football records
	Conf.			Overall
Team	W	L	T	W		L		T
Cal Poly Pomona		–		9	–	1	–	0
Southern Miss		–		9	–	1	–	0
Drake		–		8	–	2	–	0
Howard (AL)		–		7	–	2	–	0
Southern Connecticut State		–		7	–	2	–	0
St. Norbert		–		7	–	2	–	0
Hawaii		–		6	–	2	–	0
Montana State		–		7	–	3	–	0
Arkansas State		–		6	–	3	–	0
Northern Michigan		–		6	–	3	–	0
Northeastern		–		5	–	3	–	0
Wabash		–		5	–	3	–	1
Abilene Christian		–		6	–	4	–	0
East Carolina		–		5	–	4	–	0
Weber State		–		5	–	4	–	0
Wheaton (IL)		–		5	–	4	–	0
Chattanooga		–		5	–	5	–	0
Arlington State		–		4	–	6	–	0
Southern Illinois		–		4	–	6	–	0
Findlay		–		4	–	5	–	0
Tampa		–		3	–	4	–	2
UC Riverside		–		3	–	5	–	0
Idaho State		–		3	–	6	–	0
Eastern Michigan		–		2	–	5	–	0
Mississippi Vocational		–		2	–	5	–	0
Santa Clara		–		2	–	6	–	0
Carnegie Tech		–		1	–	7	–	0
Rose Poly		–		1	–	7	–	0
Union (NY)		–		1	–	7	–	0
Trinity (TX)		–		1	–	8	–	0

The 1962 Southern Miss Southerners football team was an American football team that represented the University of Southern Mississippi as an independent during the 1962 NCAA College Division football season. In its 14th season under head coach Thad Vann, the team compiled a 9–1 record, outscored opponents by a total of 258 to 63, and was recognized as the UPI small college national champion. The team's only setback was an 8–6 loss to Memphis State. Harold Hays and Johnny Sklopan were the team captains. The team played its home games at Faulkner Field in Hattiesburg, Mississippi.

== Schedule ==
Date	Opponent	Rank	Site	Result	Attendance	Source
September 15	at Arlington State		Memorial Stadium; Arlington, TX	W 28–7	9,800	
September 22	Richmond		Faulkner Field; Hattiesburg, MS	W 29–8	8,200	
September 29	Southwestern Louisiana		Faulkner Field; Hattiesburg, MS	W 29–0	8,000	
October 6	at Chattanooga	No. 4	Chamberlain Field; Chattanooga, TN	W 31–13	6,000	
October 13	at Memphis State	No. 2	Crump Stadium; Memphis, TN (rivalry)	L 6–8	11,120–11,500	
October 20	vs. NC State	No. 5	Ladd Stadium; Mobile, AL	W 30–0	10,502	
October 27	Abilene Christian	No. 4	Faulkner Field; Hattiesburg, MS	W 30–0	12,000	
November 3	at Arkansas State	No. 3	Kays Stadium; Jonesboro, AR	W 20–7	8,000	
November 10	Trinity (TX)	No. 3	Faulkner Field; Hattiesburg, MS	W 33–6	10,500	
November 17	Louisiana Tech^{†}	No. 3	Faulkner Field; Hattiesburg, MS (rivalry)	W 22–14	13,500	
^{†}Homecoming; Rankings from AP Poll released prior to the game
