= 1962 Arlington State Rebels football team =

American college football season

1962 Arlington State Rebels football
- Conference: Independent
- Record: 4–6
- Head coach: Chena Gilstrap (10th season)
- Home stadium: Memorial Stadium

1962 NCAA College Division independents football records
	Conf.			Overall
Team	W	L	T	W		L		T
Cal Poly Pomona		–		9	–	1	–	0
Southern Miss		–		9	–	1	–	0
Drake		–		8	–	2	–	0
Howard (AL)		–		7	–	2	–	0
Southern Connecticut State		–		7	–	2	–	0
St. Norbert		–		7	–	2	–	0
Hawaii		–		6	–	2	–	0
Montana State		–		7	–	3	–	0
Arkansas State		–		6	–	3	–	0
Northern Michigan		–		6	–	3	–	0
Northeastern		–		5	–	3	–	0
Wabash		–		5	–	3	–	1
Abilene Christian		–		6	–	4	–	0
East Carolina		–		5	–	4	–	0
Weber State		–		5	–	4	–	0
Chattanooga		–		5	–	5	–	0
Arlington State		–		4	–	6	–	0
Southern Illinois		–		4	–	6	–	0
Findlay		–		4	–	5	–	0
Tampa		–		3	–	4	–	2
UC Riverside		–		3	–	5	–	0
Idaho State		–		3	–	6	–	0
Eastern Michigan		–		2	–	5	–	0
Mississippi Vocational		–		2	–	5	–	0
Santa Clara		–		2	–	6	–	0
Carnegie Tech		–		1	–	7	–	0
Rose Poly		–		1	–	7	–	0
Union (NY)		–		1	–	7	–	0
Trinity (TX)		–		1	–	8	–	0

The 1962 Arlington State Rebels football team was an American football team that represented Arlington State College (now known as the University of Texas at Arlington) as an independent during the 1962 NCAA College Division football season. In their tenth year under head coach Chena Gilstrap, the team compiled a 4–6 record.

== Schedule ==
Date	Opponent	Site	Result	Attendance	Source
September 15	Southern Miss	Memorial Stadium; Arlington, TX	L 7–28	9,800	
September 21	East Texas State	Memorial Stadium; Arlington, TX	L 9–14	8,592	
September 29	at Stephen F. Austin	Panther Stadium; Lufkin, TX	W 34–14	4,000	
October 6	at West Texas State	Buffalo Bowl; Canyon, TX	L 0–49	13,000–14,000	
October 13	at Louisiana Tech	Tech Stadium; Ruston, LA	L 9–19	7,000	
October 20	McMurry	Memorial Stadium; Arlington, TX	W 25–13	6,500–6,612	
October 27	Trinity (TX)	Memorial Stadium; Arlington, TX	W 18–15	6,223–6,800	
November 3	at Abilene Christian	Shotwell Stadium; Abilene, TX	L 18–28	7,500	
November 10	Hardin–Simmons	Memorial Stadium; Arlington, TX	W 7–6	6,200–6,965	
November 17	at Memphis State	Crump Stadium; Memphis, TN	L 0–50	6,682	
