= 1962 UC Riverside Highlanders football team =

American college football season

1962 UC Riverside Highlanders football
- Conference: Independent
- Record: 3–5
- Head coach: Jim Whitley (4th season)
- Home stadium: UCR Athletic Field

1962 NCAA College Division independents football records
	Conf.			Overall
Team	W	L	T	W		L		T
Cal Poly Pomona		–		9	–	1	–	0
Southern Miss		–		9	–	1	–	0
Drake		–		8	–	2	–	0
Howard (AL)		–		7	–	2	–	0
Southern Connecticut State		–		7	–	2	–	0
St. Norbert		–		7	–	2	–	0
Hawaii		–		6	–	2	–	0
Montana State		–		7	–	3	–	0
Arkansas State		–		6	–	3	–	0
Northern Michigan		–		6	–	3	–	0
Northeastern		–		5	–	3	–	0
Wabash		–		5	–	3	–	1
Abilene Christian		–		6	–	4	–	0
East Carolina		–		5	–	4	–	0
Weber State		–		5	–	4	–	0
Wheaton (IL)		–		5	–	4	–	0
Chattanooga		–		5	–	5	–	0
Arlington State		–		4	–	6	–	0
Southern Illinois		–		4	–	6	–	0
Findlay		–		4	–	5	–	0
Tampa		–		3	–	4	–	2
UC Riverside		–		3	–	5	–	0
Idaho State		–		3	–	6	–	0
Eastern Michigan		–		2	–	5	–	0
Mississippi Vocational		–		2	–	5	–	0
Santa Clara		–		2	–	6	–	0
Carnegie Tech		–		1	–	7	–	0
Rose Poly		–		1	–	7	–	0
Union (NY)		–		1	–	7	–	0
Trinity (TX)		–		1	–	8	–	0

The 1962 UC Riverside Highlanders football team represented the University of California, Riverside as an independent during the 1962 NCAA College Division football season. Led by fourth-year head coach Jim Whitley, UC Riverside compiled a record of 3–5. The team was outscored by its opponents 187 to 120 for the season. The Highlanders played home games at UCR Athletic Field in Riverside, California.

== Schedule ==
Date	Opponent	Site	Result	Attendance	Source
September 22	Valley State	UCR Athletic Field; Riverside, CA	L 6–7		
September 29	at Redlands	Redlands Stadium (Note: This stadium is the predecessor to the current Ted Runner Stadium on the University of Redlands campus, which was opened for the 1968 season); Redlands, CA	L 12–22		
October 6	Caltech	UCR Athletic Field; Riverside, CA	W 20–8		
October 13	La Verne	UCR Athletic Field; Riverside, CA	W 18–7		
October 20	Claremont-Mudd	UCR Athletic Field; Riverside, CA	W 34–13		
October 27	at Pomona	Claremont Alumni Field; Claremont, CA	L 6–45		
November 2	at Santa Clara	Buck Shaw Stadium; Santa Clara, CA	L 12–43	4,000	
November 10	at Cal Western	Balboa Stadium?; San Diego, CA	L 12–42		
