= 1962 Idaho State Bengals football team =

American college football season

1962 Idaho State Bengals football
- Conference: Independent
- Record: 3–6
- Head coach: Babe Caccia (11th season)
- Home stadium: Spud Bowl

1962 NCAA College Division independents football records
	Conf.			Overall
Team	W	L	T	W		L		T
Cal Poly Pomona		–		9	–	1	–	0
Southern Miss		–		9	–	1	–	0
Drake		–		8	–	2	–	0
Howard (AL)		–		7	–	2	–	0
Southern Connecticut State		–		7	–	2	–	0
St. Norbert		–		7	–	2	–	0
Hawaii		–		6	–	2	–	0
Montana State		–		7	–	3	–	0
Arkansas State		–		6	–	3	–	0
Northern Michigan		–		6	–	3	–	0
Northeastern		–		5	–	3	–	0
Wabash		–		5	–	3	–	1
Abilene Christian		–		6	–	4	–	0
East Carolina		–		5	–	4	–	0
Weber State		–		5	–	4	–	0
Wheaton (IL)		–		5	–	4	–	0
Chattanooga		–		5	–	5	–	0
Arlington State		–		4	–	6	–	0
Southern Illinois		–		4	–	6	–	0
Findlay		–		4	–	5	–	0
Tampa		–		3	–	4	–	2
UC Riverside		–		3	–	5	–	0
Idaho State		–		3	–	6	–	0
Eastern Michigan		–		2	–	5	–	0
Mississippi Vocational		–		2	–	5	–	0
Santa Clara		–		2	–	6	–	0
Carnegie Tech		–		1	–	7	–	0
Rose Poly		–		1	–	7	–	0
Union (NY)		–		1	–	7	–	0
Trinity (TX)		–		1	–	8	–	0

The 1962 Idaho State Bengals football team was an American football team that represented Idaho State College (now known as Idaho State University) as an independent during the 1962 NCAA College Division football season. Led by 11th-year head coach Babe Caccia, the Bengals compiled an overall record of 3–6.

== Schedule ==
Date	Time	Opponent	Site	Result	Attendance	Source
September 22		at Colorado Mines	Brooks Field; Golden, CO	W 30–0	2,750	
September 29	2:30 pm	at Idaho	Neale Stadium; Moscow, ID (rivalry)	L 6–9	8,448	
October 6		Arizona State–Flagstaff^{†}	Spud Bowl; Pocatello, ID	L 26–35	6,500–6,800	
October 13		at Montana State	Gatton Field; Bozeman, MT	L 14–30	4,900	
October 20		at Weber State	WSC Stadium; Ogden, UT	W 42–20		
October 27		Montana	Spud Bowl; Pocatello, ID	L 15–22	4,500	
November 3		Drake	Spud Bowl; Pocatello, ID	W 33–14	4,600	
November 10		at Western State (CO)	Gunnison, CO	L 16–17		
November 17		at Nevada	Mackay Stadium; Reno, NV	L 7–14	3,000	
^{†}Homecoming; All times are in Mountain time
