= 1962 Cal Poly Pomona Broncos football team =

American college football season

1962 Cal Poly Pomona Broncos football
- Conference: Independent

Ranking
- Coaches: No. 13 (UPI small college)
- Record: 9–1
- Head coach: Don Warhurst (6th season)
- Home stadium: Kellogg Field, Mt. Sac Stadium

1962 NCAA College Division independents football records
	Conf.			Overall
Team	W	L	T	W		L		T
Cal Poly Pomona		–		9	–	1	–	0
Southern Miss		–		9	–	1	–	0
Drake		–		8	–	2	–	0
Howard (AL)		–		7	–	2	–	0
Southern Connecticut State		–		7	–	2	–	0
St. Norbert		–		7	–	2	–	0
Hawaii		–		6	–	2	–	0
Montana State		–		7	–	3	–	0
Arkansas State		–		6	–	3	–	0
Northern Michigan		–		6	–	3	–	0
Northeastern		–		5	–	3	–	0
Wabash		–		5	–	3	–	1
Abilene Christian		–		6	–	4	–	0
East Carolina		–		5	–	4	–	0
Weber State		–		5	–	4	–	0
Wheaton (IL)		–		5	–	4	–	0
Chattanooga		–		5	–	5	–	0
Arlington State		–		4	–	6	–	0
Southern Illinois		–		4	–	6	–	0
Findlay		–		4	–	5	–	0
Tampa		–		3	–	4	–	2
UC Riverside		–		3	–	5	–	0
Idaho State		–		3	–	6	–	0
Eastern Michigan		–		2	–	5	–	0
Mississippi Vocational		–		2	–	5	–	0
Santa Clara		–		2	–	6	–	0
Carnegie Tech		–		1	–	7	–	0
Rose Poly		–		1	–	7	–	0
Union (NY)		–		1	–	7	–	0
Trinity (TX)		–		1	–	8	–	0

The 1962 Cal Poly Pomona Broncos football team represented the Cal Poly Kellogg-Voorhis Unit—now known as California State Polytechnic University, Pomona—as an independent during the 1962 NCAA College Division football season. Led by sixth-year head coach Don Warhurst, Cal Poly Pomona compiled a record of 9–1. The team outscored its opponents 219 to 74 for the season. The Broncos were ranked as high as No. 12 in the UPI small college poll and finished the year at No. 13. They played fives home games at Kellogg Field in Pomona, California one at Mt. San Antonio College in Walnut, California.

== Schedule ==
Date	Time	Opponent	Rank	Site	Result	Attendance	Source
September 15		at San Diego State		Aztec Bowl; San Diego, CA	W 13–6	10,500	
September 22		at Sacramento State		Charles C. Hughes Stadium; Sacramento, CA	W 12–7	2,100–2,146	
September 29		at San Francisco State		Cox Stadium; San Francisco, CA	W 12–9	3,500–3,800	
October 6		Redlands		Kellogg Field; Pomona, CA	W 14–6	3,300	
October 13		San Diego Marines (Note: The Marine Corps Recruit Depot (MCRD) in San Diego fielded a team that played against colleges and other military teams from 1922 to 1964.)		Kellogg Field; Pomona, CA	W 12–10	3,100	
October 27		Cal Western		Kellogg Field; Pomona, CA	W 60–6	2,300	
November 3		Arizona State–Flagstaff	No. 19	Kellogg Field; Pomona, CA	W 38–0	3,700	
November 10		Nevada	No. 12	Kellogg Field; Pomona, CA	W 19–6	2,800–3,000	
November 16		at Long Beach State	No. 13	Veterans Stadium; Long Beach, CA	L 7–14	4,300	
November 22	11:00 a.m.	Los Angeles State	No. 13	Mt. Sac Stadium; Walnut, CA (White Cane Bowl)	W 32–10	5,000–5,500	
Rankings from UPI Poll released prior to the game; All times are in Pacific time
