= 1962 Arkansas State Indians football team =

American college football season

1962 Arkansas State Indians football
- Conference: Independent
- Record: 6–3
- Head coach: King Block (3rd season)
- Home stadium: Kays Stadium

1962 NCAA College Division independents football records
	Conf.			Overall
Team	W	L	T	W		L		T
Cal Poly Pomona		–		9	–	1	–	0
Southern Miss		–		9	–	1	–	0
Drake		–		8	–	2	–	0
Howard (AL)		–		7	–	2	–	0
Southern Connecticut State		–		7	–	2	–	0
St. Norbert		–		7	–	2	–	0
Hawaii		–		6	–	2	–	0
Montana State		–		7	–	3	–	0
Arkansas State		–		6	–	3	–	0
Northern Michigan		–		6	–	3	–	0
Northeastern		–		5	–	3	–	0
Wabash		–		5	–	3	–	1
Abilene Christian		–		6	–	4	–	0
East Carolina		–		5	–	4	–	0
Weber State		–		5	–	4	–	0
Chattanooga		–		5	–	5	–	0
Arlington State		–		4	–	6	–	0
Southern Illinois		–		4	–	6	–	0
Findlay		–		4	–	5	–	0
Tampa		–		3	–	4	–	2
UC Riverside		–		3	–	5	–	0
Idaho State		–		3	–	6	–	0
Eastern Michigan		–		2	–	5	–	0
Mississippi Vocational		–		2	–	5	–	0
Santa Clara		–		2	–	6	–	0
Carnegie Tech		–		1	–	7	–	0
Rose Poly		–		1	–	7	–	0
Union (NY)		–		1	–	7	–	0
Trinity (TX)		–		1	–	8	–	0

The 1962 Arkansas State Indians football team represented Arkansas State College—now known as Arkansas State University—as an independent during the 1962 NCAA College Division football season. Led by third-year head coach King Block, the Indians compiled a record of 6–3.

== Schedule ==
Date	Opponent	Site	Result	Attendance	Source
September 22	at South Dakota State	State Field; Brookings, SD	W 9–7		
September 29	at Florence State	Braly Municipal Stadium; Florence, AL	W 23–14		
October 6	Saint Mary (KS)	Kays Stadium; Jonesboro, AR	W 34–14		
October 13	Mississippi College	Kays Stadium; Jonesboro, AR	W 20–0		
October 20	The Citadel	Kays Stadium; Jonesboro, AR	W 14–7		
October 27	at Murray State	Cutchin Stadium; Murray, KY	L 9–14		
November 3	No. 3 Southern Miss	Kays Stadium; Jonesboro, AR	L 7–20	8,000	
November 10	at Tennessee Tech	Overall Field; Cookeville, TN	L 12–20		
November 17	South Dakota	Kays Stadium; Jonesboro, AR	W 18–0		
Rankings from AP Poll released prior to the game
