= 1962 Weber State Wildcats football team =

American college football season

1962 Weber State Wildcats football
- Conference: Independent
- Record: 5–4
- Head coach: Wally Nalder (7th season)
- Home stadium: WSC Stadium

1962 NCAA College Division independents football records
| | Conf. | | | Overall |
| Team | W | L | T | W | | L | | T |
|---|---|---|---|---|---|---|---|---|
| Cal Poly Pomona | | – | | 9 | – | 1 | – | 0 |
| Southern Miss | | – | | 9 | – | 1 | – | 0 |
| Drake | | – | | 8 | – | 2 | – | 0 |
| Howard (AL) | | – | | 7 | – | 2 | – | 0 |
| Southern Connecticut State | | – | | 7 | – | 2 | – | 0 |
| St. Norbert | | – | | 7 | – | 2 | – | 0 |
| Hawaii | | – | | 6 | – | 2 | – | 0 |
| Montana State | | – | | 7 | – | 3 | – | 0 |
| Arkansas State | | – | | 6 | – | 3 | – | 0 |
| Northern Michigan | | – | | 6 | – | 3 | – | 0 |
| Northeastern | | – | | 5 | – | 3 | – | 0 |
| Wabash | | – | | 5 | – | 3 | – | 1 |
| Abilene Christian | | – | | 6 | – | 4 | – | 0 |
| East Carolina | | – | | 5 | – | 4 | – | 0 |
| Weber State | | – | | 5 | – | 4 | – | 0 |
| Wheaton (IL) | | – | | 5 | – | 4 | – | 0 |
| Chattanooga | | – | | 5 | – | 5 | – | 0 |
| Arlington State | | – | | 4 | – | 6 | – | 0 |
| Southern Illinois | | – | | 4 | – | 6 | – | 0 |
| Findlay | | – | | 4 | – | 5 | – | 0 |
| Tampa | | – | | 3 | – | 4 | – | 2 |
| UC Riverside | | – | | 3 | – | 5 | – | 0 |
| Idaho State | | – | | 3 | – | 6 | – | 0 |
| Eastern Michigan | | – | | 2 | – | 5 | – | 0 |
| Mississippi Vocational | | – | | 2 | – | 5 | – | 0 |
| Santa Clara | | – | | 2 | – | 6 | – | 0 |
| Carnegie Tech | | – | | 1 | – | 7 | – | 0 |
| Rose Poly | | – | | 1 | – | 7 | – | 0 |
| Union (NY) | | – | | 1 | – | 7 | – | 0 |
| Trinity (TX) | | – | | 1 | – | 8 | – | 0 |

The 1962 Weber State Wildcats football team represented Weber State College (now known as Weber State University) as an independent during the 1962 NCAA College Division football season. Led by seventh-year head coach Wally Nalder, the Wildcats compiled an overall record of 5–4.

== Schedule ==
| Date | Opponent | Site | Result | Attendance | Source |
|---|---|---|---|---|---|
| September 15 | at Western State (CO) | Gunnison, CO | L 6–26 | | |
| September 22 | Eastern Montana | WSC Stadium; Ogden, UT | W 33–6 | | |
| September 29 | Oregon Tech | WSC Stadium; Ogden, UT | W 29–13 | | |
| October 13 | at Montana | Dornblaser Field; Missoula, MT | L 6–25 | 3,500 | |
| October 20 | Idaho State | WSC Stadium; Ogden, UT | L 20–42 | | |
| October 27 | College of Idaho | WSC Stadium; Ogden, UT | W 27–14 | 2,100 | |
| November 3 | at Eastern Oregon | La Grande, OR | W 34–0 | | |
| November 10 | Montana Western | WSC Stadium; Ogden, UT | W 28–0 | | |
| November 17 | at Southern Oregon | Fuller Field; Ashland, OR | L 3–26 | | |
