= 1962 East Carolina Pirates football team =

American college football season

1962 East Carolina Pirates football
- Conference: Independent
- Record: 5–4
- Head coach: Clarence Stasavich (1st season)
- Home stadium: College Stadium

1962 NCAA College Division independents football records
| | Conf. | | | Overall |
| Team | W | L | T | W | | L | | T |
|---|---|---|---|---|---|---|---|---|
| Cal Poly Pomona | | – | | 9 | – | 1 | – | 0 |
| Southern Miss | | – | | 9 | – | 1 | – | 0 |
| Drake | | – | | 8 | – | 2 | – | 0 |
| Howard (AL) | | – | | 7 | – | 2 | – | 0 |
| Southern Connecticut State | | – | | 7 | – | 2 | – | 0 |
| St. Norbert | | – | | 7 | – | 2 | – | 0 |
| Hawaii | | – | | 6 | – | 2 | – | 0 |
| Montana State | | – | | 7 | – | 3 | – | 0 |
| Arkansas State | | – | | 6 | – | 3 | – | 0 |
| Northern Michigan | | – | | 6 | – | 3 | – | 0 |
| Northeastern | | – | | 5 | – | 3 | – | 0 |
| Wabash | | – | | 5 | – | 3 | – | 1 |
| Abilene Christian | | – | | 6 | – | 4 | – | 0 |
| East Carolina | | – | | 5 | – | 4 | – | 0 |
| Weber State | | – | | 5 | – | 4 | – | 0 |
| Wheaton (IL) | | – | | 5 | – | 4 | – | 0 |
| Chattanooga | | – | | 5 | – | 5 | – | 0 |
| Arlington State | | – | | 4 | – | 6 | – | 0 |
| Southern Illinois | | – | | 4 | – | 6 | – | 0 |
| Findlay | | – | | 4 | – | 5 | – | 0 |
| Tampa | | – | | 3 | – | 4 | – | 2 |
| UC Riverside | | – | | 3 | – | 5 | – | 0 |
| Idaho State | | – | | 3 | – | 6 | – | 0 |
| Eastern Michigan | | – | | 2 | – | 5 | – | 0 |
| Mississippi Vocational | | – | | 2 | – | 5 | – | 0 |
| Santa Clara | | – | | 2 | – | 6 | – | 0 |
| Carnegie Tech | | – | | 1 | – | 7 | – | 0 |
| Rose Poly | | – | | 1 | – | 7 | – | 0 |
| Union (NY) | | – | | 1 | – | 7 | – | 0 |
| Trinity (TX) | | – | | 1 | – | 8 | – | 0 |

The 1962 East Carolina Pirates football team represented East Carolina College—now known as East Carolina University—during the 1962 NCAA College Division football season.

== Schedule ==
| Date | Opponent | Site | Result | Attendance | Source |
|---|---|---|---|---|---|
| September 15 | at Richmond | City Stadium; Richmond, VA | L 26–27 | 5,500 | |
| September 29 | Catawba | College Stadium; Greenville, NC | W 15–14 | 7,000 | |
| October 6 | at Elon | Burlington Memorial Stadium; Burlington, NC | L 19–23 | 3,800 | |
| October 13 | at Western Carolina | Memorial Stadium; Cullowhee, NC | L 16–20 | 6,100 | |
| October 20 | Newberry | College Stadium; Greenville, NC | W 36–8 | 9,000 | |
| October 27 | Appalachian State | College Stadium; Greenville, NC | W 29–16 | 4,000 | |
| November 3 | at Lenoir Rhyne | Moretz Stadium; Hickory, NC | L 6–7 | 7,500 | |
| November 17 | at Wofford | Snyder Field; Spartanburg, SC | W 41–9 | 3,700 | |
| November 24 | Eastern Kentucky | College Stadium; Greenville, NC | W 29–12 | 3,100 | |
