= 1962 William & Mary Indians football team =

American college football season

1962 William & Mary Indians football
- Conference: Southern Conference
- Record: 4–5–1 (4–3–1 SoCon)
- Head coach: Milt Drewer (6th season)
- Captains: Stan Penkunas; Dennis O'Toole
- Home stadium: Cary Field

1962 Southern Conference football standings
	Conf.					Overall
Team	W		L		T	W		L		T
VMI $	6	–	0	–	0	6	–	4	–	0
West Virginia	4	–	0	–	0	8	–	2	–	0
Richmond	3	–	2	–	0	6	–	3	–	0
William & Mary	4	–	3	–	1	4	–	5	–	1
Furman	2	–	2	–	0	4	–	6	–	0
Virginia Tech	2	–	3	–	0	5	–	5	–	0
The Citadel	1	–	4	–	0	3	–	7	–	0
George Washington	1	–	5	–	0	3	–	7	–	0
Davidson	0	–	4	–	1	3	–	5	–	1
$ – Conference champion

The 1962 William & Mary Indians football team was an American football team that represented the College of William & Mary as a member of the Southern Conference (SoCon) during the 1962 NCAA University Division football season. In their sixth season under head coach Milt Drewer, William & Mary compiled a 4–5–1 record, with a mark of 4–3–1 in conference play, placing fourth in the SoCon.

== Schedule ==
Date	Opponent	Site	Result	Attendance	Source
September 15	Virginia Tech	Cary Field; Williamsburg, VA	W 3–0	10,000	
September 22	Virginia*	Cary Field; Williamsburg, VA	L 7–19	12,000	
September 29	at Navy*	Navy–Marine Corps Memorial Stadium; Annapolis, MD	L 16–20	20,600–20,639	
October 6	at The Citadel	Johnson Hagood Stadium; Charleston, SC	W 29–23	10,300	
October 13	at Davidson	Richardson Stadium; Davidson, NC	T 7–7	7,500	
October 20	Furman	Cary Field; Williamsburg, VA	W 21–7	8,000	
October 27	at VMI	Alumni Memorial Field; Lexington, VA (rivalry)	L 0–6	4,000	
November 3	at West Virginia	Mountaineer Field; Morgantown, WV	L 13–28	14,000	
November 10	George Washington	Cary Field; Williamsburg, VA	W 10–6	4,500	
November 22	at Richmond	City Stadium; Richmond, VA (rivalry)	L 3–15	11,000	
*Non-conference game
