= 1962 George Washington Colonials football team =

American college football season

1962 George Washington Colonials football
- Conference: Southern Conference
- Record: 3–7 (1–5 SoCon)
- Head coach: Jim Camp (2nd season)
- Home stadium: District of Columbia Stadium

1962 Southern Conference football standings
	Conf.					Overall
Team	W		L		T	W		L		T
VMI $	6	–	0	–	0	6	–	4	–	0
West Virginia	4	–	0	–	0	8	–	2	–	0
Richmond	3	–	2	–	0	6	–	3	–	0
William & Mary	4	–	3	–	1	4	–	5	–	1
Furman	2	–	2	–	0	4	–	6	–	0
Virginia Tech	2	–	3	–	0	5	–	5	–	0
The Citadel	1	–	4	–	0	3	–	7	–	0
George Washington	1	–	5	–	0	3	–	7	–	0
Davidson	0	–	4	–	1	3	–	5	–	1
$ – Conference champion

The 1962 George Washington Colonials football team was an American football team that represented George Washington University as part of the Southern Conference during the 1962 NCAA University Division football season. In its second season under head coach Jim Camp, the team compiled a 3–7 record (1–5 in the SoCon).

== Schedule ==
Date	Opponent	Site	Result	Attendance	Source
September 15	at VMI	City Stadium; Lynchburg, VA	L 6–22	6,500	
September 22	at Virginia Tech	Victory Stadium; Roanoke, VA	L 14–15	8,000	
September 29	at BYU*	Cougar Stadium; Provo, UT	W 13–12	10,052	
October 5	Furman	District of Columbia Stadium; Washington, DC	W 14–7	7,000	
October 13	Boston University*	District of Columbia Stadium; Washington, DC	W 14–6	5,500	
October 20	at West Virginia	Mountaineer Field; Morgantown, WV	L 25–27	22,000	
October 27	Army*	District of Columbia Stadium; Washington, DC	L 0–14	26,005	
November 2	Richmond	District of Columbia Stadium; Washington, DC	L 14–17	7,000	
November 10	at William & Mary	Cary Field; Williamsburg, VA	L 6–10	4,500	
November 17	at Syracuse*	Archbold Stadium; Syracuse, NY	L 0–35	18,000	
*Non-conference game
