= 1962 The Citadel Bulldogs football team =

American college football season

1962 The Citadel Bulldogs football
- Conference: Southern Conference
- Record: 3–7 (1–4 SoCon)
- Head coach: Eddie Teague (6th season)
- Home stadium: Johnson Hagood Stadium

1962 Southern Conference football standings
	Conf.					Overall
Team	W		L		T	W		L		T
VMI $	6	–	0	–	0	6	–	4	–	0
West Virginia	4	–	0	–	0	8	–	2	–	0
Richmond	3	–	2	–	0	6	–	3	–	0
William & Mary	4	–	3	–	1	4	–	5	–	1
Furman	2	–	2	–	0	4	–	6	–	0
Virginia Tech	2	–	3	–	0	5	–	5	–	0
The Citadel	1	–	4	–	0	3	–	7	–	0
George Washington	1	–	5	–	0	3	–	7	–	0
Davidson	0	–	4	–	1	3	–	5	–	1
$ – Conference champion

The 1962 The Citadel Bulldogs football team represented The Citadel, The Military College of South Carolina in the 1962 NCAA University Division football season. Eddie Teague served as head coach for the sixth season. The Bulldogs played as members of the Southern Conference and played home games at Johnson Hagood Stadium.

== Schedule ==
Date	Opponent	Site	Result	Attendance	Source
September 15	at Florida State*	Doak Campbell Stadium; Tallahassee, FL	L 0–49		
September 22	Davidson	Johnson Hagood Stadium; Charleston, SC	W 19–0	10,200	
September 29	Presbyterian*	Johnson Hagood Stadium; Charleston, SC	W 28–8	1,500	
October 6	William & Mary	Johnson Hagood Stadium; Charleston, SC	L 23–29	10,300	
October 13	at Vanderbilt*	Dudley Field; Nashville, TN	W 21–6	14,000	
October 20	at Arkansas State*	Kays Stadium; Jonesboro, AR	L 7–14		
October 27	at Furman	Sirrine Stadium; Greenville, SC (rivalry)	L 25–33		
November 3	VMI*^{†}	Johnson Hagood Stadium; Charleston, SC (rivalry)	L 7–16	10,100	
November 10	Memphis State*	Johnson Hagood Stadium; Charleston, SC	L 13–60	10,200–10,600	
November 17	at West Virginia	Mountaineer Field; Morgantown, WV	L 0–49	14,000	
*Non-conference game; ^{†}Homecoming
