= 1962 Tampa Spartans football team =

Represented the University of Tampa in the 1962 NAIA football season

1962 Tampa Spartans football
- Conference: Independent
- Record: 3–4–2
- Head coach: Fred Pancoast (1st season)
- Home stadium: Phillips Field

1962 NCAA College Division independents football records
| | Conf. | | | Overall |
| Team | W | L | T | W | | L | | T |
|---|---|---|---|---|---|---|---|---|
| Cal Poly Pomona | | – | | 9 | – | 1 | – | 0 |
| Southern Miss | | – | | 9 | – | 1 | – | 0 |
| Drake | | – | | 8 | – | 2 | – | 0 |
| Howard (AL) | | – | | 7 | – | 2 | – | 0 |
| Southern Connecticut State | | – | | 7 | – | 2 | – | 0 |
| St. Norbert | | – | | 7 | – | 2 | – | 0 |
| Hawaii | | – | | 6 | – | 2 | – | 0 |
| Montana State | | – | | 7 | – | 3 | – | 0 |
| Arkansas State | | – | | 6 | – | 3 | – | 0 |
| Northern Michigan | | – | | 6 | – | 3 | – | 0 |
| Northeastern | | – | | 5 | – | 3 | – | 0 |
| Wabash | | – | | 5 | – | 3 | – | 1 |
| Abilene Christian | | – | | 6 | – | 4 | – | 0 |
| East Carolina | | – | | 5 | – | 4 | – | 0 |
| Weber State | | – | | 5 | – | 4 | – | 0 |
| Wheaton (IL) | | – | | 5 | – | 4 | – | 0 |
| Chattanooga | | – | | 5 | – | 5 | – | 0 |
| Arlington State | | – | | 4 | – | 6 | – | 0 |
| Southern Illinois | | – | | 4 | – | 6 | – | 0 |
| Findlay | | – | | 4 | – | 5 | – | 0 |
| Tampa | | – | | 3 | – | 4 | – | 2 |
| UC Riverside | | – | | 3 | – | 5 | – | 0 |
| Idaho State | | – | | 3 | – | 6 | – | 0 |
| Eastern Michigan | | – | | 2 | – | 5 | – | 0 |
| Mississippi Vocational | | – | | 2 | – | 5 | – | 0 |
| Santa Clara | | – | | 2 | – | 6 | – | 0 |
| Carnegie Tech | | – | | 1 | – | 7 | – | 0 |
| Rose Poly | | – | | 1 | – | 7 | – | 0 |
| Union (NY) | | – | | 1 | – | 7 | – | 0 |
| Trinity (TX) | | – | | 1 | – | 8 | – | 0 |

The 1962 Tampa Spartans football team represented the University of Tampa during the 1962 NCAA College Division football season, which marked the Spartans' 26th season. The team was led by first-year head coach Fred Pancoast and played their home games at Phillips Field in Tampa, Florida. They finished with three wins, four losses and two ties (3–4–2).

== Schedule ==
| Date | Opponent | Site | Result | Attendance | Source |
|---|---|---|---|---|---|
| September 22 | Eastern Kentucky | Phillips Field; Tampa, FL | L 6–22 | 9,000 | |
| September 28 | at Southeastern Louisiana | Strawberry Stadium; Hammond, LA | L 7–27 | 8,000 | |
| October 6 | McNeese State | Phillips Field; Tampa, FL | T 10–10 | 6,000 | |
| October 13 | at Southwestern Louisiana | McNaspy Stadium; Lafayette, LA | T 14–14 | 8,000 | |
| October 20 | Presbyterian | Phillips Field; Tampa, FL | W 10–0 | 7,000 | |
| October 27 | Quantico Marines | Stewart Field; St. Petersburg, FL | L 3–32 | 5,500 | |
| November 3 | Troy State | Phillips Field; Tampa, FL | W 30–3 | 6,000–7,000 | |
| November 17 | Furman | Phillips Field; Tampa, FL | W 15–14 | 6,500–7,000 | |
| November 24 | Appalachian State | Phillips Field; Tampa, FL | L 7–9 | 6,000–6,500 | |
