= 1962 Furman Paladins football team =

American college football season

1962 Furman Paladins football
- Conference: Southern Conference
- Record: 4–6 (2–2 SoCon)
- Head coach: Bob King (5th season)
- Captains: Olin Hill; Elton Brunty
- Home stadium: Sirrine Stadium

1962 Southern Conference football standings
| | Conf. | | | | | Overall |
| Team | W | | L | | T | W | | L | | T |
|---|---|---|---|---|---|---|---|---|---|---|
| VMI $ | 6 | – | 0 | – | 0 | 6 | – | 4 | – | 0 |
| West Virginia | 4 | – | 0 | – | 0 | 8 | – | 2 | – | 0 |
| Richmond | 3 | – | 2 | – | 0 | 6 | – | 3 | – | 0 |
| William & Mary | 4 | – | 3 | – | 1 | 4 | – | 5 | – | 1 |
| Furman | 2 | – | 2 | – | 0 | 4 | – | 6 | – | 0 |
| Virginia Tech | 2 | – | 3 | – | 0 | 5 | – | 5 | – | 0 |
| The Citadel | 1 | – | 4 | – | 0 | 3 | – | 7 | – | 0 |
| George Washington | 1 | – | 5 | – | 0 | 3 | – | 7 | – | 0 |
| Davidson | 0 | – | 4 | – | 1 | 3 | – | 5 | – | 1 |
$ – Conference champion

The 1962 Furman Paladins football team was an American football team that represented Furman University as a member of the Southern Conference (SoCon) during the 1962 NCAA University Division football season. In their fifth season under head coach Bob King, Furman compiled a 4–6 record, with a mark of 2–2 in conference play, placing fifth in the SoCon.

== Schedule ==
| Date | Opponent | Site | Result | Attendance | Source |
|---|---|---|---|---|---|
| September 15 | Presbyterian* | Sirrine Stadium; Greenville, SC | W 40–6 | 9,000 | |
| September 22 | Wofford* | Sirrine Stadium; Greenville, SC (rivalry) | W 34–21 | 8,000 | |
| September 29 | at Florida State* | Doak Campbell Stadium; Tallahassee, FL | L 0–42 | | |
| October 5 | at George Washington | District of Columbia Stadium; Washington, DC | L 7–14 | 7,000 | |
| October 13 | Howard (AL)* | Sirrine Stadium; Greenville, SC | L 7–14 | 9,000 | |
| October 20 | at William & Mary | Cary Field; Williamsburg, VA | L 7–21 | 8,000 | |
| October 27 | The Citadel | Sirrine Stadium; Greenville, SC (rivalry) | W 33–25 | | |
| November 3 | at Davidson | Richardson Stadium; Davidson, NC | W 14–7 | | |
| November 10 | Clemson* | Sirrine Stadium; Greenville, SC | L 3–44 | | |
| November 17 | at Tampa* | Phillips Field; Tampa, FL | L 14–15 | 6,500–7,000 | |
*Non-conference game
