= 1962 Richmond Spiders football team =

American college football season

1962 Richmond Spiders football
- Conference: Southern Conference
- Record: 6–3 (3–2 SoCon)
- Head coach: Ed Merrick (12th season)
- Captains: J. Yaffa; B. Vann; G. Rapp
- Home stadium: City Stadium

1962 Southern Conference football standings
| | Conf. | | | | | Overall |
| Team | W | | L | | T | W | | L | | T |
|---|---|---|---|---|---|---|---|---|---|---|
| VMI $ | 6 | – | 0 | – | 0 | 6 | – | 4 | – | 0 |
| West Virginia | 4 | – | 0 | – | 0 | 8 | – | 2 | – | 0 |
| Richmond | 3 | – | 2 | – | 0 | 6 | – | 3 | – | 0 |
| William & Mary | 4 | – | 3 | – | 1 | 4 | – | 5 | – | 1 |
| Furman | 2 | – | 2 | – | 0 | 4 | – | 6 | – | 0 |
| Virginia Tech | 2 | – | 3 | – | 0 | 5 | – | 5 | – | 0 |
| The Citadel | 1 | – | 4 | – | 0 | 3 | – | 7 | – | 0 |
| George Washington | 1 | – | 5 | – | 0 | 3 | – | 7 | – | 0 |
| Davidson | 0 | – | 4 | – | 1 | 3 | – | 5 | – | 1 |
$ – Conference champion

The 1962 Richmond Spiders football team was an American football team that represented the University of Richmond as a member of the Southern Conference (SoCon) during the 1962 NCAA University Division football season. In their twelfth season under head coach Ed Merrick, Richmond compiled a 6–3 record, with a mark of 3–2 in conference play, finishing in third place in the SoCon.

== Schedule ==
| Date | Opponent | Site | Result | Attendance | Source |
|---|---|---|---|---|---|
| September 15 | East Carolina* | City Stadium; Richmond, VA | W 27–26 | 5,500 | |
| September 22 | at Southern Miss* | Faulkner Field; Hattiesburg, MS | L 8–29 | | |
| September 28 | VMI | City Stadium; Richmond, VA (rivalry) | L 0–21 | 10,500 | |
| October 13 | at Virginia Tech | Miles Stadium; Blacksburg, VA | L 7–13 | | |
| October 20 | at Boston University* | Boston University Field; Boston, MA | W 14–7 | 6,472 | |
| October 27 | at Cincinnati* | Nippert Stadium; Cincinnati, OH | W 21–20 | 15,420 | |
| November 2 | at George Washington | District of Columbia Stadium; Washington, DC | W 17–14 | 7,000 | |
| November 10 | at Davidson | Richardson Stadium; Davidson, NC | W 28–20 | 7,000 | |
| November 22 | William & Mary | City Stadium; Richmond, VA (rivalry) | W 15–3 | 11,000 | |
*Non-conference game
