= Bob Burns (American football coach) =

American football player and coach (1921–2000)

Biographical details
- Born: February 7, 1921; Sioux City, Iowa, U.S.
- Died: November 6, 2000 (aged 79); Sioux Falls, South Dakota, U.S.

Playing career
- 1939–1942: South Dakota
- Positions: Fullback, quarterback

Coaching career (HC unless noted)
- 1947–1948: Yankton HS (SD)
- 1949–1955: Sioux Falls Washington HS (SD)
- 1956–1961: Augustana (SD)
- 1962: South Dakota

Head coaching record
- Overall: 29–29–2

Robert Geering Burns (February 7, 1921 – November 6, 2000) was an American football player and coach. He served as the head football coach at Augustana College—now known as Augustana University—in Sioux Falls, South Dakota, from 1956 to 1961 and the University of South Dakota in 1962, compiling a career college football coaching record of 29–29–2. He died in November 2000 at the age of 79.

== Head coaching record ==
Year	Team	Overall	Conference	Standing	Bowl/playoffs
Augustana (South Dakota) Vikings (North Central Conference) (1956–1961)
1956	Augustana	6–3	4–2	T–2nd	
1957	Augustana	0–7	0–5	T–6th	
1958	Augustana	5–3	3–3	T–3rd	
1959	Augustana	6–2–1	4–1–1	1st	
1960	Augustana	6–2	4–2	T–2nd	
1961	Augustana	5–3–1	4–2	T–3rd	
Augustana:		28–20–2	19–15–1		
South Dakota Coyotes (North Central Conference) (1962)
1962	South Dakota	1–9	1–5	6th	
South Dakota:		1–9	1–5		
Total:		29–29–2			
