= 1962 Tulsa Golden Hurricane football team =

American college football season

1962 Tulsa Golden Hurricane football

MVC champion
- Conference: Missouri Valley Conference
- Record: 5–5 (3–0 MVC)
- Head coach: Glenn Dobbs (2nd season)
- Home stadium: Skelly Stadium

1962 Missouri Valley Conference football standings
	Conf.					Overall
Team	W		L		T	W		L		T
Tulsa $	3	–	0	–	0	5	–	5	–	0
North Texas State	2	–	1	–	0	6	–	4	–	0
Cincinnati	1	–	2	–	0	2	–	8	–	0
Wichita	0	–	3	–	0	3	–	7	–	0
$ – Conference champion

The 1962 Tulsa Golden Hurricane football team represented the University of Tulsa during the 1962 NCAA University Division football season. In their second year under head coach Glenn Dobbs, the Golden Hurricane compiled a 5–5 record (3–0 against Missouri Valley Conference opponents) and won the conference championship. The team's statistical leaders included Stu McBirnie with 1,169 passing yards, Hank Dorsch with 250 rushing yards, and John Simmons with 860 receiving yards.

== Schedule ==
Date	Opponent	Site	Result	Attendance	Source
September 15	Hardin–Simmons*	Skelly Stadium; Tulsa, OK	W 39–0	14,000	
September 29	at Arkansas*	Razorback Stadium; Fayetteville, AR	L 14–42	26,000	
October 6	Oklahoma State*	Skelly Stadium; Tulsa, OK (rivalry)	L 7–17	15,022	
October 13	North Texas State	Skelly Stadium; Tulsa, OK	W 34–0	8,500	
October 20	Louisville*^{†}	Skelly Stadium; Tulsa, OK	W 25–7	8,000	
October 27	at No. 2 Alabama*	Denny Stadium; Tuscaloosa, AL	L 6–35	25,000	
November 3	at Cincinnati	Nippert Stadium; Cincinnati, OH	W 24–18	7,500	
November 10	at Houston*	Rice Stadium; Houston, TX	L 31–35	15,000	
November 17	Toledo*	Skelly Stadium; Tulsa, OK	L 18–21	5,000	
November 22	Wichita	Skelly Stadium; Tulsa, OK	W 21–6	10,000	
*Non-conference game; ^{†}Homecoming; Rankings from AP Poll released prior to the game; Source:

== After the season ==
=== 1963 NFL draft ===
The following Golden Hurricane players were selected in the 1963 NFL draft following the season.

Round	Pick	Player	Position	NFL club
3	42	Tony Liscio	Tackle	Green Bay Packers
6	76	John Simmons	End	Green Bay Packers
17	232	Ken Reed	Guard	San Francisco 49ers

=== 1963 AFL draft ===
The following Golden Hurricane players were selected in the 1963 American Football League draft following the season.

Round	Pick	Player	Position	AFL club
10	75	Tony Liscio	Tackle	New York Jets
14	108	John Simmons	End	Buffalo Bills
