= 1962 Southern Illinois Salukis football team =

American college football season

1962 Southern Illinois Salukis football
- Conference: Independent
- Record: 4–6
- Head coach: Carmen Piccone (4th season)
- Home stadium: McAndrew Stadium

1962 NCAA College Division independents football records
| | Conf. | | | Overall |
| Team | W | L | T | W | | L | | T |
|---|---|---|---|---|---|---|---|---|
| Cal Poly Pomona | | – | | 9 | – | 1 | – | 0 |
| Southern Miss | | – | | 9 | – | 1 | – | 0 |
| Drake | | – | | 8 | – | 2 | – | 0 |
| Howard (AL) | | – | | 7 | – | 2 | – | 0 |
| Southern Connecticut State | | – | | 7 | – | 2 | – | 0 |
| St. Norbert | | – | | 7 | – | 2 | – | 0 |
| Hawaii | | – | | 6 | – | 2 | – | 0 |
| Montana State | | – | | 7 | – | 3 | – | 0 |
| Arkansas State | | – | | 6 | – | 3 | – | 0 |
| Northern Michigan | | – | | 6 | – | 3 | – | 0 |
| Northeastern | | – | | 5 | – | 3 | – | 0 |
| Wabash | | – | | 5 | – | 3 | – | 1 |
| Abilene Christian | | – | | 6 | – | 4 | – | 0 |
| East Carolina | | – | | 5 | – | 4 | – | 0 |
| Weber State | | – | | 5 | – | 4 | – | 0 |
| Wheaton (IL) | | – | | 5 | – | 4 | – | 0 |
| Chattanooga | | – | | 5 | – | 5 | – | 0 |
| Arlington State | | – | | 4 | – | 6 | – | 0 |
| Southern Illinois | | – | | 4 | – | 6 | – | 0 |
| Findlay | | – | | 4 | – | 5 | – | 0 |
| Tampa | | – | | 3 | – | 4 | – | 2 |
| UC Riverside | | – | | 3 | – | 5 | – | 0 |
| Idaho State | | – | | 3 | – | 6 | – | 0 |
| Eastern Michigan | | – | | 2 | – | 5 | – | 0 |
| Mississippi Vocational | | – | | 2 | – | 5 | – | 0 |
| Santa Clara | | – | | 2 | – | 6 | – | 0 |
| Carnegie Tech | | – | | 1 | – | 7 | – | 0 |
| Rose Poly | | – | | 1 | – | 7 | – | 0 |
| Union (NY) | | – | | 1 | – | 7 | – | 0 |
| Trinity (TX) | | – | | 1 | – | 8 | – | 0 |

The 1962 Southern Illinois Salukis football team was an American football team that represented Southern Illinois University (now known as Southern Illinois University Carbondale) as an independent during the 1962 NCAA College Division football season. Under fourth-year head coach Carmen Piccone, the team compiled a 4–6 record. The team played its home games at McAndrew Stadium in Carbondale, Illinois.

== Schedule ==
| Date | Opponent | Rank | Site | Result | Attendance | Source |
|---|---|---|---|---|---|---|
| September 15 | at Texas A&I | | Javelina Stadium; Kingsville, TX | L 10–14 | 8,000 | |
| September 22 | at Drake | | Drake Stadium; Des Moines, IA | L 13–14 | 7,500 | |
| September 29 | at Central Michigan | | Alumni Field; Mount Pleasant, MI | W 43–6 | 4,800–5,000 | |
| October 13 | Hillsdale | | McAndrew Stadium; Carbondale, IL | W 13–6 | 11,500 | |
| October 20 | Lincoln (MO) | No. 8 | McAndrew Stadium; Carbondale, IL | W 13–0 | 10,500 | |
| October 27 | Illinois State Normal^{†} | No. 9 | McAndrew Stadium; Carbondale, IL | W 14–0 | 13,000–13,500 | |
| November 3 | at Northern Michigan | No. 9 | Memorial Field; Marquette, MI | L 9–14 | 3,500 | |
| November 10 | Fort Campbell | | McAndrew Stadium; Carbondale, IL | L 7–14 | 8,000 | |
| November 17 | at Bowling Green | | University Stadium; Bowling Green, OH | L 0–21 | 8,100–8,125 | |
| November 24 | North Texas State | | McAndrew Stadium; Carbondale, IL | L 30–35 | 3,000–3,500 | |
^{†}Homecoming; Rankings from AP Poll released prior to the game
