= 1962 West Virginia Mountaineers football team =

American college football season

1962 West Virginia Mountaineers football
- Conference: Southern Conference
- Record: 8–2 (4–0 SoCon)
- Head coach: Gene Corum (3rd season)
- Home stadium: Mountaineer Field

1962 Southern Conference football standings
	Conf.					Overall
Team	W		L		T	W		L		T
VMI $	6	–	0	–	0	6	–	4	–	0
West Virginia	4	–	0	–	0	8	–	2	–	0
Richmond	3	–	2	–	0	6	–	3	–	0
William & Mary	4	–	3	–	1	4	–	5	–	1
Furman	2	–	2	–	0	4	–	6	–	0
Virginia Tech	2	–	3	–	0	5	–	5	–	0
The Citadel	1	–	4	–	0	3	–	7	–	0
George Washington	1	–	5	–	0	3	–	7	–	0
Davidson	0	–	4	–	1	3	–	5	–	1
$ – Conference champion

The 1962 West Virginia Mountaineers football team represented West Virginia University as a member of the Southern Conference (SoCon) during the 1962 NCAA University Division football season. Led by third-year head coach Gene Corum, the Mountaineers compiled an overall record of 8–2 with a mark of 4–0 in conference play, placing second in the SoCon.

== Schedule ==
Date	Opponent	Site	Result	Attendance	Source
September 22	Vanderbilt*	Mountaineer Field; Morgantown, WV	W 26–0	24,000	
September 29	vs. Virginia Tech	City Stadium; Richmond, VA (Tobacco Bowl, rivalry)	W 14–0	19,000	
October 6	Boston University*	Mountaineer Field; Morgantown, WV	W 7–0	20,000	
October 13	at Pittsburgh*	Pitt Stadium; Pittsburgh, PA (rivalry)	W 15–8	34,091	
October 20	George Washington	Mountaineer Field; Morgantown, WV	W 27–25	22,000	
October 27	at Oregon State*	Multnomah Stadium; Portland, OR	L 22–51	17,469	
November 3	William & Mary	Mountaineer Field; Morgantown, WV	W 28–13	14,000	
November 10	at Penn State*	Beaver Stadium; University Park, PA (rivalry)	L 6–34	33,212	
November 17	The Citadel	Mountaineer Field; Morgantown, WV	W 49–0	14,000	
November 24	at Syracuse*	Archbold Stadium; Syracuse, NY (rivalry)	W 17–6	13,000	
*Non-conference game
