= 1962 North Dakota State Bison football team =

American college football season

1962 North Dakota State Bison football
- Conference: North Central Conference
- Record: 0–10 (0–6 NCC)
- Head coach: Bob Danielson (6th season)
- Home stadium: Dacotah Field

1962 North Central Conference football standings
	Conf.					Overall
Team	W		L		T	W		L		T
State College of Iowa +	5	–	0	–	1	7	–	1	–	1
South Dakota State +	5	–	0	–	1	7	–	2	–	1
Augustana (SD)	4	–	2	–	0	6	–	3	–	0
North Dakota	3	–	3	–	0	5	–	4	–	0
Morningside	2	–	4	–	0	2	–	7	–	0
South Dakota	1	–	5	–	0	1	–	9	–	0
North Dakota State	0	–	6	–	0	0	–	10	–	0
+ – Conference co-champions

The 1962 North Dakota State Bison football team was an American football team that represented North Dakota State University during the 1962 NCAA College Division football season as a member of the North Central Conference. In their sixth year under head coach Bob Danielson, the team compiled a 0–10 record.

== Schedule ==
Date	Opponent	Site	Result	Attendance	Source
September 8	Moorhead State*	Dacotah Field; Fargo, ND	L 8–22	1,500	
September 15	Concordia–Moorhead*	Dacotah Field; Fargo, ND	L 13–32	6,850	
September 22	at Montana State*	Memorial Stadium; Great Falls, MT	L 2–37	6,000	
September 29	Morningside	Dacotah Field; Fargo, ND	L 8–34	4,100	
October 6	at State College of Iowa	O. R. Latham Stadium; Cedar Falls, IA	L 0–33	4,000–4,500	
October 13	Augustana (SD)^{†}	Dacotah Field; Fargo, ND	L 16–22	3,648	
October 20	at North Dakota	Memorial Stadium; Grand Forks, ND (Nickel Trophy)	L 7–30	8,500	
October 27	South Dakota State	Dacotah Field; Fargo, ND (rivalry)	L 6–17	1,000	
November 3	at South Dakota	Inman Field; Vermillion, SD	L 12–33	1,000	
November 10	at Drake*	Drake Stadium; Des Moines, IA	L 6–40	4,500	
*Non-conference game; ^{†}Homecoming
