= 1962 Virginia Tech Gobblers football team =

American college football season

1962 Virginia Tech Gobblers football
- Conference: Southern Conference
- Record: 5–5 (2–3 SoCon)
- Head coach: Jerry Claiborne (2nd season)
- Home stadium: Miles Stadium

1962 Southern Conference football standings
	Conf.					Overall
Team	W		L		T	W		L		T
VMI $	6	–	0	–	0	6	–	4	–	0
West Virginia	4	–	0	–	0	8	–	2	–	0
Richmond	3	–	2	–	0	6	–	3	–	0
William & Mary	4	–	3	–	1	4	–	5	–	1
Furman	2	–	2	–	0	4	–	6	–	0
Virginia Tech	2	–	3	–	0	5	–	5	–	0
The Citadel	1	–	4	–	0	3	–	7	–	0
George Washington	1	–	5	–	0	3	–	7	–	0
Davidson	0	–	4	–	1	3	–	5	–	1
$ – Conference champion

The 1962 Virginia Tech Gobblers football team represented the Virginia Polytechnic Institute or VPI (now known as Virginia Polytechnic Institute and State University or Virginia Tech) as a member of the Southern Conference (SoCon) during the 1962 NCAA University Division football season. Led by second-year head coach Jerry Claiborne the Gobblers compiled an overall record of 5–5 with a mark of 2–3 in conference play, and finished sixth in the SoCon. VPI played home games at Miles Stadium in Blacksburg, Virginia.

== Schedule ==
Date	Time	Opponent	Site	Result	Attendance	Source
September 15		at William & Mary	Cary Field; Williamsburg, VA	L 0–3	10,000	
September 22	3:00 p.m.	vs. George Washington	Victory Stadium; Roanoke, VA	W 15–14	8,000	
September 29		vs. West Virginia	City Stadium; Richmond, VA (Tobacco Bowl, rivalry)	L 0–14	19,000	
October 6	2:30 p.m.	vs. Virginia*	Victory Stadium; Roanoke, VA (Harvest Bowl, rivalry)	W 20–15	18,000	
October 13	2:00 p.m.	Richmond^{†}	Miles Stadium; Blacksburg, VA	W 13–7		
October 20		at Army*	Michie Stadium; West Point, NY	L 12–20	25,124	
October 27		at Florida State*	Doak Campbell Stadium; Tallahassee, FL	L 7–20	16,000	
November 3		at Tulane*	Tulane Stadium; New Orleans, LA	W 24–22	18,000	
November 10		Wake Forest*	Miles Stadium; Blacksburg, VA	W 37–8	8,200	
November 22	1:30 p.m.	vs. VMI	Victory Stadium; Roanoke, VA (rivalry)	L 9–14	25,000	
*Non-conference game; ^{†}Homecoming; All times are in Eastern time

== Roster ==
The following players were members of the 1962 football team according to the roster published in the 1963 edition of The Bugle, the Virginia Tech yearbook.

VPI 1962 roster
Jake Adams; Kyle Marlon Albright; William McLemore Babb; Darryl Bailey; Gerald Bobbitte; Joe Bloomer; K. "Buddy" Booth; Gene Breen; Jim Brown; Mike Cahill; Alex Camaioni; Phillip W. Cary; Pete Cartwright; Robert Carr Churchill; George Clark; George Washington Clear; Joseph Edward Cox; Dickie Cranwell	Lacy Lee Edwards, Jr.; Martin Forbes; Ronald Wayne Frank; David Green; Walter Newton Green, Jr.; David W. Gillespie; Bob Gregory; Tom Hampton; Thomas Morgan Hawkins; Wayne Hewitt; James Venable Hickam; Wynston Holbrook; Michael Joseph Hvozdovic; Lynn Jones; T. Jones; Dickie Kelly; Victor "Vic" William Kreiter, Jr.; Bosey Lane	Tommy Marvin; M. McQuary; John Mullins; Darrell Page; Bob Peak; Larry Philpot; Douglas Bradley Robbins; Randy Robinette; Burt Mack Rodgers; Bob Schweickert; Aster Sizemore; C. Stevens; Silas Alexander "Sonny" Utz, III; Joseph Gilleece "Skip" Vance; Al Verthein; Thomas Merritt Walker; K. T. "Buddy" Weihe; Calvin Beecher Wolfe
