= 1962 Cincinnati Bearcats football team =

American college football season

1962 Cincinnati Bearcats football
- Conference: Missouri Valley Conference
- Record: 2–8 (1–2 MVC)
- Head coach: Chuck Studley (2nd season)
- Captains: Rufus Simmons; Phil Goldner
- Home stadium: Nippert Stadium

1962 Missouri Valley Conference football standings
	Conf.					Overall
Team	W		L		T	W		L		T
Tulsa $	3	–	0	–	0	5	–	5	–	0
North Texas State	2	–	1	–	0	6	–	4	–	0
Cincinnati	1	–	2	–	0	2	–	8	–	0
Wichita	0	–	3	–	0	3	–	7	–	0
$ – Conference champion

The 1962 Cincinnati Bearcats football team represented the University of Cincinnati in the Missouri Valley Conference (MVC) during the 1962 NCAA University Division football season. Led by second-year head coach Chuck Studley, the Bearcats compiled an overall record of 2–8 with a mark of 1–2 in conference play, placing third in the MVC. The team played home games at Nippert Stadium in Cincinnati.

== Schedule ==
Date	Opponent	Site	Result	Attendance	Source
September 22	Dayton*	Nippert Stadium; Cincinnati, OH	W 13–0	15,000	
September 29	Indiana*	Nippert Stadium; Cincinnati, OH	L 6–26	14,000	
October 6	Wichita	Nippert Stadium; Cincinnati, OH	W 27–15	10,000	
October 20	at North Texas State	Fouts Field; Denton, TX	L 8–14	14,000–14,500	
October 27	Richmond*^{†}	Nippert Stadium; Cincinnati, OH	L 20–21	15,420	
November 3	Tulsa	Nippert Stadium; Cincinnati, OH	L 18–24	7,500	
November 9	at Detroit*	University of Detroit Stadium; Detroit, MI	L 14–15	8,393	
November 17	Miami (OH)*	Nippert Stadium; Cincinnati, OH (Victory Bell)	L 16–38	10,500	
November 24	Xavier*	Nippert Stadium; Cincinnati, OH (rivalry)	L 6–7	16,000	
December 1	at Houston*	Rice Stadium; Houston, TX	L 14–42	10,000	
*Non-conference game; ^{†}Homecoming; Source:
