= 1962 Army Cadets football team =

American college football season

1962 Army Cadets football
- Conference: Independent
- Record: 6–4
- Head coach: Paul Dietzel (1st season)
- Captain: John Ellerson
- Home stadium: Michie Stadium

1962 NCAA University Division independents football records
	Conf.			Overall
Team	W	L	T	W		L		T
Memphis State		–		8	–	1	–	0
Oregon State		–		9	–	2	–	0
No. 9 Penn State		–		9	–	2	–	0
West Texas State		–		9	–	2	–	0
Boston College		–		8	–	2	–	0
Utah State		–		8	–	2	–	0
Villanova		–		7	–	3	–	0
Buffalo		–		6	–	3	–	0
Oregon		–		6	–	3	–	1
Houston		–		7	–	4	–	0
Miami (FL)		–		7	–	4	–	0
Army		–		6	–	4	–	0
Holy Cross		–		6	–	4	–	0
Louisville		–		6	–	4	–	0
Xavier		–		6	–	4	–	0
Florida State		–		4	–	3	–	3
Air Force		–		5	–	5	–	0
Montana		–		5	–	5	–	0
Navy		–		5	–	5	–	0
Notre Dame		–		5	–	5	–	0
Pacific (CA)		–		5	–	5	–	0
Pittsburgh		–		5	–	5	–	0
Syracuse		–		5	–	5	–	0
Texas Western		–		4	–	5	–	0
New Mexico State		–		4	–	6	–	0
Colgate		–		3	–	5	–	1
Idaho		–		2	–	6	–	1
San Jose State		–		2	–	8	–	1
Boston University		–		2	–	7	–	0
Dayton		–		2	–	8	–	0
Detroit		–		1	–	8	–	0
Hardin–Simmons		–		1	–	9	–	0
Colorado State		–		0	–	10	–	0
Rankings from AP Poll

The 1962 Army Cadets football team represented the United States Military Academy as an independent during the 1962 NCAA University Division football season. In their first year under head coach Paul Dietzel, the Cadets compiled a 6–4 record and outscored all opponents by a combined total of 152 to 104. In the annual Army–Navy Game, the Cadets lost to the Midshipmen by a 34 to 14 score. The Cadets also lost to Michigan, Oklahoma State, and Pittsburgh.

No Army players were selected on the 1962 College Football All-America Team.

== Schedule ==
Date	Time	Opponent	Rank	Site	Result	Attendance	Source
September 22		Wake Forest		Michie Stadium; West Point, NY	W 40–14	17,205–17,250	
September 29		vs. Syracuse		Polo Grounds; New York, NY	W 9–2	29,500	
October 6		at Michigan	No. 10	Michigan Stadium; Ann Arbor, MI	L 7–17	70,749	
October 13		Penn State		Michie Stadium; West Point, NY	W 9–6	31,000	
October 20		Virginia Tech		Michie Stadium; West Point, NY	W 20–12	25,124	
October 27		at George Washington		District of Columbia Stadium; Washington, DC	W 14–0	26,005	
November 3		at Boston University		Boston University Field; Boston, MA	W 26–0	16,000	
November 10		Oklahoma State		Michie Stadium; West Point, NY	L 7–12	31,000	
November 17		vs. Pittsburgh		Yankee Stadium; Bronx, NY	L 6–7	23,917	
December 1	1:30 p.m.	vs. Navy		Philadelphia Municipal Stadium; Philadelphia, PA (Army–Navy Game)	L 14–34	102,000	
Rankings from AP Poll released prior to the game; All times are in Eastern time; Source:
