= 1962 North Dakota Fighting Sioux football team =

American college football season

1962 North Dakota Fighting Sioux football
- Conference: North Central Conference
- Record: 5–4 (3–3 NCC)
- Head coach: Marvin C. Helling (6th season)
- Home stadium: Memorial Stadium

1962 North Central Conference football standings
	Conf.					Overall
Team	W		L		T	W		L		T
State College of Iowa +	5	–	0	–	1	7	–	1	–	1
South Dakota State +	5	–	0	–	1	7	–	2	–	1
Augustana (SD)	4	–	2	–	0	6	–	3	–	0
North Dakota	3	–	3	–	0	5	–	4	–	0
Morningside	2	–	4	–	0	2	–	7	–	0
South Dakota	1	–	5	–	0	1	–	9	–	0
North Dakota State	0	–	6	–	0	0	–	10	–	0
+ – Conference co-champions

The 1962 North Dakota Fighting Sioux football team, also known as the Nodaks, was an American football team that represented the University of North Dakota in the North Central Conference (NCC) during the 1962 NCAA College Division football season. In its sixth year under head coach Marvin C. Helling, the team compiled a 5–4 record (3–3 against NCC opponents), finished in fourth place out of seven teams in the NCC, and outscored opponents by a total of 120 to 84. The team played its home games at Memorial Stadium in Grand Forks, North Dakota.

== Schedule ==
Date	Opponent	Site	Result	Attendance	Source
September 15	Youngstown*	Memorial Stadium; Grand Forks, ND	W 20–7		
September 22	Montana*	Memorial Stadium; Grand Forks, ND	W 14–8	6,000	
September 29	at Augustana (SD)	Howard Wood Stadium; Sioux Falls, SD	L 0–7		
October 6	at Morningside	Public Schools Stadium; Sioux City, IA	W 14–0		
October 13	at South Dakota State	Brookings, SD (Hobo Day)	L 0–26	9,000	
October 20	North Dakota State^{†}	Memorial Stadium; Grand Forks, ND (rivalry)	W 30–7	8,500	
October 27	State College of Iowa	Memorial Stadium; Grand Forks, ND	L 8–13		
November 3	at Montana State*	Gatton Field; Bozeman, MT	L 3–16	4,700	
November 10	South Dakota	Memorial Stadium; Grand Forks, ND (rivalry)	W 31–0		
*Non-conference game; ^{†}Homecoming
