= 1962 Chattanooga Moccasins football team =

American college football season

1962 Chattanooga Moccasins football
- Conference: Independent
- Record: 5–5
- Head coach: Scrappy Moore (32nd season)
- Captain: Wayne Farmer
- Home stadium: Chamberlain Field

1962 NCAA College Division independents football records
	Conf.			Overall
Team	W	L	T	W		L		T
Cal Poly Pomona		–		9	–	1	–	0
Southern Miss		–		9	–	1	–	0
Drake		–		8	–	2	–	0
Howard (AL)		–		7	–	2	–	0
Southern Connecticut State		–		7	–	2	–	0
St. Norbert		–		7	–	2	–	0
Hawaii		–		6	–	2	–	0
Montana State		–		7	–	3	–	0
Arkansas State		–		6	–	3	–	0
Northern Michigan		–		6	–	3	–	0
Northeastern		–		5	–	3	–	0
Wabash		–		5	–	3	–	1
Abilene Christian		–		6	–	4	–	0
East Carolina		–		5	–	4	–	0
Weber State		–		5	–	4	–	0
Wheaton (IL)		–		5	–	4	–	0
Chattanooga		–		5	–	5	–	0
Arlington State		–		4	–	6	–	0
Southern Illinois		–		4	–	6	–	0
Findlay		–		4	–	5	–	0
Tampa		–		3	–	4	–	2
UC Riverside		–		3	–	5	–	0
Idaho State		–		3	–	6	–	0
Eastern Michigan		–		2	–	5	–	0
Mississippi Vocational		–		2	–	5	–	0
Santa Clara		–		2	–	6	–	0
Carnegie Tech		–		1	–	7	–	0
Rose Poly		–		1	–	7	–	0
Union (NY)		–		1	–	7	–	0
Trinity (TX)		–		1	–	8	–	0

The 1962 Chattanooga Moccasins football team was an American football team that represented the University of Chattanooga (now known as the University of Tennessee at Chattanooga) during the 1962 NCAA College Division football season. In their 32nd year under head coach Scrappy Moore, the team compiled a 5–5 record.

== Schedule ==
Date	Opponent	Site	Result	Attendance	Source
September 15	Howard (AL)	Chamberlain Field; Chattanooga, TN	L 12–22	7,500–8,450	
September 22	at Tennessee Tech	Overall Field; Cookeville, TN	W 20–7	4,300–7,000	
September 29	East Tennessee State	Chamberlain Field; Chattanooga, TN	W 14–13	7,500	
October 6	No. 4 Southern Miss	Chamberlain Field; Chattanooga, TN	L 13–31	6,000–8,300	
October 13	at Auburn	Cliff Hare Stadium; Auburn, AL	L 6–54	20,000–22,000	
October 20	Middle Tennessee^{†}	Chamberlain Field; Chattanooga, TN	W 34–13	7,000–8,500	
October 27	at Tennessee	Shields–Watkins Field; Knoxville, TN	L 14–48	16,000	
November 3	at Presbyterian	Bailey Stadium; Clinton, SC	W 31–20	3,000–3,500	
November 10	at No. 4 (UD) Ole Miss	Hemingway Stadium; Oxford, MS	L 7–52	9,200	
November 22	Southeastern Louisiana	Chamberlain Field; Chattanooga, TN	W 21–19	5,100	
^{†}Homecoming; Rankings from AP Poll released prior to the game
