= 1962 VMI Keydets football team =

American college football season

1962 VMI Keydets football

SoCon champion
- Conference: Southern Conference
- Record: 6–4 (6–0 SoCon)
- Head coach: John McKenna (10th season)
- Home stadium: Alumni Field

1962 Southern Conference football standings
	Conf.					Overall
Team	W		L		T	W		L		T
VMI $	6	–	0	–	0	6	–	4	–	0
West Virginia	4	–	0	–	0	8	–	2	–	0
Richmond	3	–	2	–	0	6	–	3	–	0
William & Mary	4	–	3	–	1	4	–	5	–	1
Furman	2	–	2	–	0	4	–	6	–	0
Virginia Tech	2	–	3	–	0	5	–	5	–	0
The Citadel	1	–	4	–	0	3	–	7	–	0
George Washington	1	–	5	–	0	3	–	7	–	0
Davidson	0	–	4	–	1	3	–	5	–	1
$ – Conference champion

The 1962 VMI Keydets football team was an American football team that represented the Virginia Military Institute (VMI) as a member of the Southern Conference (SoCon) during the 1962 NCAA University Division football season. Led by tenth-year head coach John McKenna, the Keydets compiled an overall record of 6–4 with a mark of 6–0 in conference play, winning the SoCon title.

== Schedule ==
Date	Opponent	Site	Result	Attendance	Source
September 15	George Washington	City Stadium; Lynchburg, VA	W 22–6	6,500	
September 22	at Villanova*	Villanova Stadium; Villanova, PA	L 0–24	8,000–8,500	
September 29	at Richmond	City Stadium; Richmond, VA	W 21–0	10,500	
October 6	at Boston College*	Alumni Stadium; Chestnut Hill, MA	L 0–18	14,500	
October 13	at Virginia*	Scott Stadium; Charlottesville, VA	L 6–28	19,000	
October 20	Davidson	Alumni Memorial Field; Lexington, VA	W 20–7		
October 27	William & Mary	Alumni Memorial Field; Lexington, VA (rivalry)	W 6–0	4,000	
November 3	at The Citadel	Johnson Hagood Stadium; Charleston, SC (rivalry)	W 16–7	10,100	
November 10	at Holy Cross*	Fitton Field; Worcester, MA	L 14–20	10,000	
November 22	vs. Virginia Tech	Victory Stadium; Roanoke, VA (rivalry)	W 14–9	25,000	
*Non-conference game
