= John Simmons (American football end) =

Former American football end

- Simmons on cover of 1963 Collegiate Football Record Book

Profile
- Position: End

Personal information
- Born: October 1, 1939
- Died: December 9, 2019 (aged 80); Savannah, Georgia, U.S.
- Listed height: 6 ft 3 in (1.91 m)
- Listed weight: 200 lb (91 kg)

Career information
- High school: Benson (Omaha, Nebraska)
- College: Omaha (1959); Northeastern A&M (1961); Tulsa (1962-1963)

Career history
- Buffalo Bills (1963)*; Winnipeg Blue Bombers (1964); Toronto Argonauts (1965)*; Omaha Mustangs (1965)
- * Offseason or practice squad member only

Awards and highlights
- Most valuable offensive player, PFLA (1965)

John Simmons (October 1, 1939 – December 9, 2019) was an American football end. Playing for the 1962 Tulsa Golden Hurricane football team, he ranked second in the country with 65 receptions for 860 yards. He also played professional football for the Winnipeg Blue Bombers of the Canadian Football League (CFL) in 1964 and for the Omaha Mustangs of the Professional Football League of America (PFLA) in 1965. He was selected as the most valuable offensive player in the PFLA.

== Early life ==
Simmon attended Benson High School in Omaha, Nebraska. He won letters in basketball, football, track and baseball.

== College football ==
Simmons began his college career playing freshman football at Omaha University in 1959. He then joined the Army, and after his release he enrolled at Northeastern A&M in Miami, Oklahoma. His college career was interrupted for a second time when he was recalled by the Army due to the Berlin Crisis of 1961.

Simmons was recruited by coaches from the University of Tulsa and joined the Tulsa Golden Hurricane for the 1962 and 1963 seasons. In 1962, he led the country in receiving with one week remaining, but he was passed by Vern Burke in the final week. Simmons ended the 1962 season having broken Tulsa's single-season receiving records and ranked second nationally in both receptions (65) and receiving yards (860).

== Professional football ==
Simmons was drafted by the Green Bay Packers in the sixth round (76th overall pick) of the 1963 NFL draft and by the Buffalo Bills in the 14th round (108th pick) of the 1963 AFL draft. He signed with the Buffalo Bills of the American Football League, but was released before the regular season. He played for the Winnipeg Blue Bombers of the Canadian Football League in 1964 and the Omaha Mustangs of the Professional Football League of America (PFLA) in 1965. During the 1965 season, he tallied 64 receptions for 944 yards and 16 touchdowns and was selected as the most valuable offensive player in the PFLA for the 1965 season.
