= 1962 Wichita Shockers football team =

American college football season

1962 Wichita Shockers football
- Conference: Missouri Valley Conference
- Record: 3–7 (0–3 MVC)
- Head coach: Marcelino Huerta (1st season)
- Home stadium: Veterans Field

1962 Missouri Valley Conference football standings
	Conf.					Overall
Team	W		L		T	W		L		T
Tulsa $	3	–	0	–	0	5	–	5	–	0
North Texas State	2	–	1	–	0	6	–	4	–	0
Cincinnati	1	–	2	–	0	2	–	8	–	0
Wichita	0	–	3	–	0	3	–	7	–	0
$ – Conference champion

The 1962 Wichita Shockers football team was an American football team that represented Wichita University (now known as Wichita State University) as a member of the Missouri Valley Conference during the 1962 NCAA University Division football season. In its first season under head coach Marcelino Huerta, the team compiled a 3–7 record (0–3 against conference opponents), finished in last place out of four teams in the MVC, and was outscored by a total of 139 to 127. The team played its home games at Veterans Field, now known as Cessna Stadium. Pro Football Hall of Fame coach Bill Parcells was a junior linebacker on the team.

== Schedule ==
Date	Opponent	Site	Result	Attendance	Source
September 15	Louisville*	Veterans Field; Wichita, KS	L 20–21	14,600	
September 22	Arizona State*	Veterans Field; Wichita, KS	L 10–21	11,529–11,530	
September 29	Hardin–Simmons*	Veterans Field; Wichita, KS	W 13–6	9,662	
October 6	at Cincinnati	Nippert Stadium; Cincinnati, OH	L 15–27	10,000	
October 13	New Mexico State*	Veterans Field; Wichita, KS	W 24–6	9,891	
October 20	at Drake*	Drake Stadium; Des Moines, IA	L 0–10	7,500	
October 27	Montana State*	Veterans Field; Wichita, KS	W 32–10	7,630	
November 3	North Texas State	Veterans Field; Wichita, KS	L 7–9	8,185	
November 17	at Dayton	Baujan Field; Dayton, OH	L 0–8	5,000	
November 22	at Tulsa	Skelly Stadium; Tulsa, OK	L 6–21	10,000–10,057	
*Non-conference game; Source:
