= 1962 South Dakota Coyotes football team =

American college football season

1962 South Dakota Coyotes football
- Conference: North Central Conference
- Record: 1–9 (1–5 NCC)
- Head coach: Bob Burns (1st season)
- Home stadium: Inman Field

1962 North Central Conference football standings
	Conf.					Overall
Team	W		L		T	W		L		T
State College of Iowa +	5	–	0	–	1	7	–	1	–	1
South Dakota State +	5	–	0	–	1	7	–	2	–	1
Augustana (SD)	4	–	2	–	0	6	–	3	–	0
North Dakota	3	–	3	–	0	5	–	4	–	0
Morningside	2	–	4	–	0	2	–	7	–	0
South Dakota	1	–	5	–	0	1	–	9	–	0
North Dakota State	0	–	6	–	0	0	–	10	–	0
+ – Conference co-champions

The 1962 South Dakota Coyotes football team was an American football team that represented the University of South Dakota in the North Central Conference (NCC) during the 1962 NCAA College Division football season. In its first season under head coach Bob Burns, the team compiled a 1–9 record (1–5 against NCC opponents), finished in sixth place out of seven teams in the NCC, and was outscored by a total of 265 to 94. The team played its home games at Inman Field in Vermillion, South Dakota.

== Schedule ==
Date	Opponent	Site	Result	Attendance	Source
September 15	at Colorado State–Greeley*	Greeley, CO	L 26–35		
September 22	at Nebraska*	Memorial Stadium; Lincoln, NE	L 0–53	26,953	
September 29	State College of Iowa	Inman Field; Vermillion, SD	L 0–28		
October 6	Drake*	Inman Field; Vermillion, SD	L 14–15	1,500	
October 13	at Morningside	Public Schools Stadium; Sioux City, IA	L 13–34		
October 20	South Dakota State	Inman Field; Vermillion, SD	L 0–24		
October 27	at Augustana (SD)	Howard Wood Stadium; Sioux Falls, SD	L 8–15		
November 3	North Dakota State	Inman Field; Vermillion, SD	W 33–12		
November 10	at North Dakota	Memorial Stadium; Grand Forks, ND	L 0–31	8,500	
November 17	at Arkansas State*	Kays Stadium; Jonesboro, AR	L 0–18		
*Non-conference game
