= 1962 State College of Iowa Panthers football team =

American college football season

1962 State College of Iowa Panthers football

NCC co-champion
- Conference: North Central Conference
- Record: 7–1–1 (5–0–1 NCC)
- Head coach: Stan Sheriff (3rd season)
- Home stadium: O. R. Latham Stadium

1962 North Central Conference football standings
	Conf.					Overall
Team	W		L		T	W		L		T
State College of Iowa +	5	–	0	–	1	7	–	1	–	1
South Dakota State +	5	–	0	–	1	7	–	2	–	1
Augustana (SD)	4	–	2	–	0	6	–	3	–	0
North Dakota	3	–	3	–	0	5	–	4	–	0
Morningside	2	–	4	–	0	2	–	7	–	0
South Dakota	1	–	5	–	0	1	–	9	–	0
North Dakota State	0	–	6	–	0	0	–	10	–	0
+ – Conference co-champions

The 1962 State College of Iowa Panthers football team represented State College of Iowa (later renamed University of Northern Iowa) in the North Central Conference during the 1962 NCAA College Division football season. In its third season under head coach Stan Sheriff, the team compiled a 7–1–1 record (5–0–1 against NCC opponents) and tied for the NCC championship. The team played its home games at O. R. Latham Stadium in Cedar Falls, Iowa.

Two players won all-conference honors: fullback Dan Boals and tackle Ted Minnick.

== Schedule ==
Date	Opponent	Site	Result	Attendance	Source
September 15	Bradley	O. R. Latham Stadium; Cedar Falls, IA	W 27–6	7,500	
September 22	at Mankato State	Mankato, MN	W 20–8	3,000	
September 29	at South Dakota	Vermillion, SD	W 28–0		
October 6	North Dakota State	O. R. Latham Stadium; Cedar Falls, IA	W 33–0	4,000	
October 13	Drake	O. R. Latham Stadium; Cedar Falls, IA	L 15–21	6,800	
October 20	Morningside	O. R. Latham Stadium; Cedar Falls, IA	W 21–18		
October 27	at North Dakota	Grand Forks, ND	W 13–8		
November 3	South Dakota State	O. R. Latham Stadium; Cedar Falls, IA	T 13–13		
November 10	Augustana (SD)	O. R. Latham Stadium; Cedar Falls, IA	W 21–15		
