= 1962 Montana State Bobcats football team =

American college football season

1962 Montana State Bobcats football
- Conference: Independent
- Record: 7–3
- Head coach: Herb Agocs (5th season)
- Home stadium: Gatton Field; Memorial Stadium (Great Falls)

1962 NCAA College Division independents football records
	Conf.			Overall
Team	W	L	T	W		L		T
Cal Poly Pomona		–		9	–	1	–	0
Southern Miss		–		9	–	1	–	0
Drake		–		8	–	2	–	0
Howard (AL)		–		7	–	2	–	0
Southern Connecticut State		–		7	–	2	–	0
St. Norbert		–		7	–	2	–	0
Hawaii		–		6	–	2	–	0
Montana State		–		7	–	3	–	0
Arkansas State		–		6	–	3	–	0
Northern Michigan		–		6	–	3	–	0
Northeastern		–		5	–	3	–	0
Wabash		–		5	–	3	–	1
Abilene Christian		–		6	–	4	–	0
East Carolina		–		5	–	4	–	0
Weber State		–		5	–	4	–	0
Wheaton (IL)		–		5	–	4	–	0
Chattanooga		–		5	–	5	–	0
Arlington State		–		4	–	6	–	0
Southern Illinois		–		4	–	6	–	0
Findlay		–		4	–	5	–	0
Tampa		–		3	–	4	–	2
UC Riverside		–		3	–	5	–	0
Idaho State		–		3	–	6	–	0
Eastern Michigan		–		2	–	5	–	0
Mississippi Vocational		–		2	–	5	–	0
Santa Clara		–		2	–	6	–	0
Carnegie Tech		–		1	–	7	–	0
Rose Poly		–		1	–	7	–	0
Union (NY)		–		1	–	7	–	0
Trinity (TX)		–		1	–	8	–	0

The 1962 Montana State Bobcats football team was an American football team that represented Montana State College (now Montana State University) as an independent during the 1962 NCAA College Division football season. In its fifth and final season under head coach Herb Agocs, the team played its home games on campus at Gatton Field in Bozeman and compiled a 7–3 record.

== Schedule ==
Date	Opponent	Site	Result	Attendance	Source
September 15	at Arizona State–Flagstaff	Lumberjack Stadium; Flagstaff, AZ	W 27–6	4,500	
September 22	North Dakota State	Memorial Stadium; Great Falls, MT	W 37–2	6,000	
September 29	South Dakota State	Gatton Field; Bozeman, MT	W 14–10		
October 6	Utah State	Gatton Field; Bozeman, MT	L 13–41	7,200	
October 13	Idaho State	Gatton Field; Bozeman, MT	W 30–14	4,900	
October 20	Idaho^{†}	Gatton Field; Bozeman, MT	W 33–15	7,400	
October 27	at Wichita	Veterans Field; Wichita, KS	L 10–32	7,630	
November 3	North Dakota	Gatton Field; Bozeman, MT	W 16–3	4,700	
November 10	at Montana	Dornblaser Field; Missoula, MT (rivalry)	L 19–36	8,200	
November 24	at No. 9 Fresno State	Ratcliffe Stadium; Fresno, CA	W 21–20	10,425	
^{†}Homecoming; Rankings from AP Poll released prior to the game
