= 1962 North Texas State Eagles football team =

American college football season

1962 North Texas State Eagles football
- Conference: Missouri Valley Conference
- Record: 6–4 (2–1 MVC)
- Head coach: Odus Mitchell (17th season)
- Home stadium: Fouts Field

1962 Missouri Valley Conference football standings
	Conf.					Overall
Team	W		L		T	W		L		T
Tulsa $	3	–	0	–	0	5	–	5	–	0
North Texas State	2	–	1	–	0	6	–	4	–	0
Cincinnati	1	–	2	–	0	2	–	8	–	0
Wichita	0	–	3	–	0	3	–	7	–	0
$ – Conference champion

The 1962 North Texas State Eagles football team was an American football team that represented North Texas State University (now known as the University of North Texas) during the 1962 NCAA University Division football season as a member of the Missouri Valley Conference. In their 17th year under head coach Odus Mitchell, the team compiled a 6–4 record.

== Schedule ==
Date	Opponent	Site	Result	Attendance	Source
September 22	Texas Western*	Fouts Field; Denton, TX	W 19–6	8,000	
September 29	Memphis State*	Fouts Field; Denton, TX	L 6–14	6,000	
October 6	Hardin–Simmons*	Fouts Field; Denton, TX	W 29–8	5,000	
October 13	at Tulsa	Skelly Field; Tulsa, OK	L 0–34	8,500	
October 20	Cincinnati^{†}	Fouts Field; Denton, TX	W 14–8	14,000–14,500	
October 27	at New Mexico State*	Memorial Stadium; Las Cruces, NM	L 12–48		
November 3	at Wichita	Veterans Field; Wichita, KS	W 9–7	8,185	
November 10	West Texas State*	Fouts Field; Denton, TX	W 20–13	9,000	
November 17	at Louisville*	Fairgrounds Stadium; Louisville, KY	L 10–14	5,107	
November 24	at Southern Illinois*	McAndrew Stadium; Carbondale, IL	W 55–30	3,000–3,500	
*Non-conference game; ^{†}Homecoming
