= 1962 Davidson Wildcats football team =

American college football season

1962 Davidson Wildcats football
- Conference: Southern Conference
- Record: 3–5–1 (0–4–1 SoCon)
- Head coach: Bill Dole (11th season)
- Home stadium: Richardson Stadium

1962 Southern Conference football standings
	Conf.					Overall
Team	W		L		T	W		L		T
VMI $	6	–	0	–	0	6	–	4	–	0
West Virginia	4	–	0	–	0	8	–	2	–	0
Richmond	3	–	2	–	0	6	–	3	–	0
William & Mary	4	–	3	–	1	4	–	5	–	1
Furman	2	–	2	–	0	4	–	6	–	0
Virginia Tech	2	–	3	–	0	5	–	5	–	0
The Citadel	1	–	4	–	0	3	–	7	–	0
George Washington	1	–	5	–	0	3	–	7	–	0
Davidson	0	–	4	–	1	3	–	5	–	1
$ – Conference champion

The 1962 Davidson Wildcats football team represented Davidson College as a member of the Southern Conference (SoCon) during the 1962 NCAA University Division football season. Led by 11th-year head coach Bill Dole, the Wildcats compiled an overall record of 3–5–1 with a mark of 0–4–1 in conference play, placing last out of ninth teams in the SoCon.

== Schedule ==
Date	Opponent	Site	Result	Attendance	Source
September 15	vs. Catawba*	American Legion Memorial Stadium; Charlotte, NC	W 21–0	2,631	
September 22	at The Citadel	Johnson Hagood Stadium; Charleston, SC	L 0–19	10,200	
September 29	at Wofford*	Snyder Field; Spartanburg, SC	W 15–0		
October 6	at Presbyterian*	Bailey Stadium; Clinton, SC	W 13–9	3,000	
October 13	William & Mary	Richardson Stadium; Davidson, NC	T 7–7	7,500	
October 20	at VMI	Alumni Memorial Field; Lexington, VA	L 7–20		
October 27	at Virginia*	Scott Stadium; Charlottesville, VA	L 7–34	18,000	
November 3	Furman	Richardson Stadium; Davidson, NC	L 7–14		
November 10	Richmond	Richardson Stadium; Davidson, NC	L 20–28	7,000	
*Non-conference game
