= 1962 Syracuse Orangemen football team =

American college football season

1962 Syracuse Orangemen football
- Conference: Independent
- Record: 5–5
- Head coach: Ben Schwartzwalder (14th season)
- Captain: Leon Cholakis
- Home stadium: Archbold Stadium

1962 NCAA University Division independents football records
	Conf.			Overall
Team	W	L	T	W		L		T
Memphis State		–		8	–	1	–	0
Oregon State		–		9	–	2	–	0
No. 9 Penn State		–		9	–	2	–	0
West Texas State		–		9	–	2	–	0
Boston College		–		8	–	2	–	0
Utah State		–		8	–	2	–	0
Villanova		–		7	–	3	–	0
Buffalo		–		6	–	3	–	0
Oregon		–		6	–	3	–	1
Houston		–		7	–	4	–	0
Miami (FL)		–		7	–	4	–	0
Army		–		6	–	4	–	0
Holy Cross		–		6	–	4	–	0
Louisville		–		6	–	4	–	0
Xavier		–		6	–	4	–	0
Florida State		–		4	–	3	–	3
Air Force		–		5	–	5	–	0
Montana		–		5	–	5	–	0
Navy		–		5	–	5	–	0
Notre Dame		–		5	–	5	–	0
Pacific (CA)		–		5	–	5	–	0
Pittsburgh		–		5	–	5	–	0
Syracuse		–		5	–	5	–	0
Texas Western		–		4	–	5	–	0
New Mexico State		–		4	–	6	–	0
Colgate		–		3	–	5	–	1
Idaho		–		2	–	6	–	1
San Jose State		–		2	–	8	–	1
Boston University		–		2	–	7	–	0
Dayton		–		2	–	8	–	0
Detroit		–		1	–	8	–	0
Hardin–Simmons		–		1	–	9	–	0
Colorado State		–		0	–	10	–	0
Rankings from AP Poll

The 1962 Syracuse Orangemen football team represented Syracuse University as an independent during the 1962 NCAA University Division football season. Led by 14th-year head coach Ben Schwartzwalder, the Orangemen compiled a record of 5–5. The offense scored 159 points while the defense allowed 110 points.

== Schedule ==
Date	Opponent	Site	Result	Attendance	Source
September 22	at Oklahoma	Oklahoma Memorial Stadium; Norman, OK	L 3–7	54,000	
September 29	vs. Army	Polo Grounds; New York, NY	L 2–9	29,500	
October 13	Boston College	Archbold Stadium; Syracuse, NY	W 12–0	31,000	
October 20	at Penn State	Beaver Stadium; University Park, PA (rivalry)	L 19–20	46,920	
October 27	at Holy Cross	Fitton Field; Worcester, MA	W 30–20	20,000	
November 3	at Pittsburgh	Pitt Stadium; Pittsburgh, PA (rivalry)	L 6–24	23,473	
November 10	Navy	Archbold Stadium; Syracuse, NY	W 34–6	40,500	
November 17	George Washington	Archbold Stadium; Syracuse, NY	W 35–0	18,000	
November 24	West Virginia	Archbold Stadium; Syracuse, NY (rivalry)	L 6–17	13,000	
December 8	at UCLA	Los Angeles Memorial Coliseum; Los Angeles, CA	W 12–7	14,485	

== NFL draft ==
Player	Round	Pick	Position	Club
John Mackey	2	19	Tight end	Baltimore Colts
Don King	6	83	Halfback	Detroit Lions
Walt Sweeney	8	107	Guard	Cleveland Browns
Dave Meggyesy	17	226	Linebacker	St. Louis Cardinals
