= 1962 Los Angeles State Diablos football team =

American college football season

1962 Los Angeles State Diablos football
- Conference: California Collegiate Athletic Association
- Record: 2–8 (0–5 CCAA)
- Head coach: Leonard Adams (12th season)
- Home stadium: L.A. State Stadium

1962 California Collegiate Athletic Association football standings
	Conf.					Overall
Team	W		L		T	W		L		T
San Diego State $	5	–	0	–	0	8	–	2	–	0
Fresno State	4	–	1	–	0	7	–	3	–	0
Long Beach State	2	–	3	–	0	5	–	5	–	0
Cal Poly	2	–	3	–	0	4	–	5	–	0
UC Santa Barbara	2	–	3	–	0	2	–	8	–	0
Los Angeles State	0	–	5	–	0	2	–	8	–	0
Valley State	0	–	0	–	0	3	–	6	–	0
$ – Conference champion; Games with Valley State did not count in the conference standings.

The 1962 Los Angeles State Diablos football team represented Los Angeles State College—now known as California State University, Los Angeles—as a member of the California Collegiate Athletic Association (CCAA) during the 1962 NCAA College Division football season. Led by Leonard Adams in his 12th and final season as head coach, Los Angeles State compiled an overall record of 2–8 with a mark of 0–5 in conference play, placing sixth the CCAA. The Diablos played home games at L.A. State Stadium in Los Angeles.

Adams finished tenure at Los Angeles State with an overall record of 41–61–6, for a .407 winning percentage.

== Schedule ==
Date	Time	Opponent	Site	Result	Attendance	Source
September 22		at San Diego State	Aztec Bowl; San Diego, CA	L 14–26	8,500	
September 29		Hawaii*	L.A. State Stadium; Los Angeles, CA	W 10–6	3,267	
October 6		UC Santa Barbara*	L.A. State Stadium; Los Angeles, CA	L 13–23		
October 13		Pacific (CA)	L.A. State Stadium; Los Angeles, CA	L 13–34	3,400	
October 20		No. 2 Fresno State	L.A. State Stadium; Los Angeles, CA	L 0–34	4,630	
October 27		at University of Mexico*	Estadio Olímpico Universitario; Mexico City, Mexico	W 28–10		
November 3		at Cal Poly	Mustang Stadium; San Luis Obispo, CA	L 0–28		
November 10		Long Beach State^{†}	L.A. State Stadium; Los Angeles, CA	L 22–23	3,170	
November 17		at Valley State*	Monroe High School; Sepulveda, CA	L 13–15	1,500	
November 22	11:00 a.m.	at Cal Poly Pomona	Mt. Sac Stadium; Walnut, CA	L 10–32	5,000–5,500	
*Non-conference game; ^{†}Homecoming; Rankings from AP Poll released prior to the game; All times are in Pacific time

== Team players in the NFL ==
The following Los Angeles State players were selected in the 1963 NFL draft.

Player	Position	Round	Overall	NFL team
Harold Gray	Linebacker	13	179	Pittsburgh Steelers
