= 1962 Long Beach State 49ers football team =

American college football season

1962 Long Beach State 49ers football
- Conference: California Collegiate Athletic Association
- Record: 5–5 (2–3 CCAA)
- Head coach: Don Reed (5th season)
- Home stadium: Veterans Memorial Stadium

1962 California Collegiate Athletic Association football standings
	Conf.					Overall
Team	W		L		T	W		L		T
San Diego State $	5	–	0	–	0	8	–	2	–	0
Fresno State	4	–	1	–	0	7	–	3	–	0
Long Beach State	2	–	3	–	0	5	–	5	–	0
Cal Poly	2	–	3	–	0	4	–	5	–	0
UC Santa Barbara	2	–	3	–	0	2	–	8	–	0
Los Angeles State	0	–	5	–	0	2	–	8	–	0
Valley State	0	–	0	–	0	3	–	6	–	0
$ – Conference champion; Games with Valley State did not count in the conference standings.

The 1962 Long Beach State 49ers football team represented Long Beach State College—now known as California State University, Long Beach—as a member of the California Collegiate Athletic Association (CCAA) during the 1962 NCAA College Division football season. Led by fifth-year head coach Don Reed, the 49ers compiled an overall record of 5–5 with a mark of 2–3 in conference play, placing in a three-way tie for third in the CCAA. The team played home games at Veterans Memorial Stadium adjacent to the campus of Long Beach City College in Long Beach, California.

== Schedule ==
Date	Time	Opponent	Site	Result	Attendance	Source
September 15	8:00 pm	San Diego Marines (Note: The Marine Corps Recruit Depot (MCRD) in San Diego fielded a team that played against colleges and other military teams from 1922 to 1964.)*	Veterans Memorial Stadium; Long Beach, CA	L 0–39		
September 22	8:00 pm	San Francisco State*	Veterans Memorial Stadium; Long Beach, CA	L 7–20	3,831	
September 29	8:00 pm	at Sacramento State*	Charles C. Hughes Stadium; Sacramento, CA	W 13–9	2,779	
October 6	8:00 pm	San Diego State	Veterans Memorial Stadium; Long Beach, CA	L 8–36	5,000	
October 13	8:00 pm	UC Santa Barbara	Veterans Memorial Stadium; Long Beach, CA	L 6–7	4,004	
October 20	8:00 pm	at Valley State*	Monroe High; Sepulveda, CA	W 41–6	2,500	
October 27	8:00 pm	Cal Poly	Veterans Memorial Stadium; Long Beach, CA	W 14–6		
November 3	8:00 pm	at No. 10 Fresno State	Ratcliffe Stadium; Fresno, CA	L 0–50	8,092	
November 10	8:00 pm	at Los Angeles State	L.A. State Stadium; Los Angeles, CA	W 23–22	3,170	
November 16	8:00 pm	Cal Poly Pomona*	Veterans Memorial Stadium; Long Beach, CA	W 14–7	4,300	
*Non-conference game; Rankings from AP Poll released prior to the game
