= 1962 San Diego State Aztecs football team =

American college football season

1962 San Diego State Aztecs football

CCAA champion
- Conference: California Collegiate Athletic Association
- Record: 8–2 (5–0 CCAA)
- Head coach: Don Coryell (2nd season)
- Home stadium: Aztec Bowl

1962 California Collegiate Athletic Association football standings
	Conf.					Overall
Team	W		L		T	W		L		T
San Diego State $	5	–	0	–	0	8	–	2	–	0
Fresno State	4	–	1	–	0	7	–	3	–	0
Long Beach State	2	–	3	–	0	5	–	5	–	0
Cal Poly	2	–	3	–	0	4	–	5	–	0
UC Santa Barbara	2	–	3	–	0	2	–	8	–	0
Los Angeles State	0	–	5	–	0	2	–	8	–	0
Valley State	0	–	0	–	0	3	–	6	–	0
$ – Conference champion; Games with Valley State did not count in the conference standings.

The 1962 San Diego State Aztecs football team represented San Diego State College—now known as San Diego State University as a member of the California Collegiate Athletic Association (CCAA) during the 1962 NCAA College Division football season. Led by second-year head coach Don Coryell, the Aztecs compiled an overall record of 8–2 with a mark of 5–0 in conference play, winning the CCAA title. For the year, the offense averaged almost 30 points a game, totaling 294 points. The defense gave up an average of 13 points a game, totaling 135 in 10 games. San Diego State played home games at the Aztec Bowl in San Diego.

== Schedule ==
Date	Opponent	Site	Result	Attendance	Source
September 15	Cal Poly Pomona*	Aztec Bowl; San Diego, CA	L 6–13	10,500	
September 22	Los Angeles State	Aztec Bowl; San Diego, CA	W 26–14	8,500	
September 29	at Cal Poly	StadiumMustang Stadium; San Luis Obispo, CA	W 35–14		
October 6	at Long Beach State	Veterans Stadium; Long Beach, CA	W 36–8	5,000	
October 13	Redlands*	Aztec Bowl; San Diego, CA	W 39–0	8,500	
October 19	at UC Santa Barbara	La Playa Stadium; Santa Barbara, CA	W 46–8	4,000	
October 27	No. 3 Fresno State	Aztec Bowl; San Diego, CA (rivalry)	W 29–26	13,000	
November 3	Valley State*	Aztec Bowl; San Diego, CA	W 39–0	6,000–6,500	
November 10	Pacific (CA)*^{†}	Aztec Bowl; San Diego, CA	W 32–18	12,500–12,700	
November 17	San Diego Marines (Note: The Marine Corps Recruit Depot (MCRD) in San Diego fielded a team that played against colleges and other military teams from 1922 to 1964.)*	Aztec Bowl; San Diego	L 6–34	14,000	
*Non-conference game; ^{†}Homecoming; Rankings from AP Poll released prior to the game

== Team players in the NFL/AFL ==
The following San Diego State players were selected in the 1963 NFL draft.

Player	Position	Round	Overall	NFL team
Neal Petties	End	14	187	Baltimore Colts
Kern Carson	Halfback	17	229	Baltimore Colts

The following San Diego State players were selected in the 1963 AFL Draft.

Player	Position	Round	Overall	NFL team
Neal Petties	End	21	161	Oakland Raiders
Kern Carson	Halfback	29	229	Denver Broncos

== Team awards ==
Award	Player
Most Valuable Player (John Simcox Memorial Trophy)	Kern Carson
Outstanding Offensive & Defensive Linemen (Byron H. Chase Memorial Trophy)	David Lay
Most Inspirational Player	Warren Simmons
