= 1962 Valley State Matadors football team =

American college football season

1962 Valley State Matadors football
- Conference: California Collegiate Athletic Association
- Record: 3–6 (0–0 CCAA)
- Head coach: Sam Winningham (1st season)
- Home stadium: Monroe High School

1962 California Collegiate Athletic Association football standings
| | Conf. | | | | | Overall |
| Team | W | | L | | T | W | | L | | T |
|---|---|---|---|---|---|---|---|---|---|---|
| San Diego State $ | 5 | – | 0 | – | 0 | 8 | – | 2 | – | 0 |
| Fresno State | 4 | – | 1 | – | 0 | 7 | – | 3 | – | 0 |
| Long Beach State | 2 | – | 3 | – | 0 | 5 | – | 5 | – | 0 |
| Cal Poly | 2 | – | 3 | – | 0 | 4 | – | 5 | – | 0 |
| UC Santa Barbara | 2 | – | 3 | – | 0 | 2 | – | 8 | – | 0 |
| Los Angeles State | 0 | – | 5 | – | 0 | 2 | – | 8 | – | 0 |
| Valley State | 0 | – | 0 | – | 0 | 3 | – | 6 | – | 0 |
$ – Conference champion; Games with Valley State did not count in the conference standings.

The 1962 Valley State Matadors football team represented San Fernando Valley State College—now known as California State University, Northridge—as a member of the California Collegiate Athletic Association (CCAA) during the 1962 NCAA College Division football season. This was the first year the school played a varsity football schedule. Led by first-year head coach Sam Winningham, Valley State compiled an overall record of 3–6. The Matadors played fives games against conference members, winning two and losing three, but those contests did not count in the CCAA standings. The team played home games at Monroe High School in Sepulveda, California.

== Schedule ==
| Date | Opponent | Site | Result | Attendance | Source |
|---|---|---|---|---|---|
| September 22 | at UC Riverside* | Highlander Stadium; Riverside, CA | W 7–6 | 700 | |
| September 29 | Claremont-Mudd* | Monroe High School; Sepulveda, CA | L 7–11 | 3,000 | |
| October 6 | at Cal Poly* | Mustang Stadium; San Luis Obispo, CA | L 7–38 | 2,500 | |
| October 13 | Occidental* | Monroe High School; Sepulveda, CA | L 7–34 | 1,700 | |
| October 20 | Long Beach State* | Monroe High School; Sepulveda, CA | L 6–41 | 2,500 | |
| October 27 | at UC Santa Barbara* | La Playa Stadium; Santa Barbara, CA | W 13–6 | 1,400–6,500 | |
| November 3 | at San Diego State* | Aztec Bowl; San Diego, CA | L 0–39 | 6,000–6,500 | |
| November 10 | San Diego Marines (Note: The Marine Corps Recruit Depot (MCRD) in San Diego fielded a team that played against colleges and other military teams from 1922 to 1964.)* | ?; San Diego, CA | L 0–41 | 7,000 | |
| November 17 | Los Angeles State* | Monroe High School; Sepulveda, CA | W 15–13 | 1,500 | |
*Non-conference game
