= 1962 Cal Poly Mustangs football team =

American college football season

1962 Cal Poly Mustangs football
- Conference: California Collegiate Athletic Association
- Record: 4–5 (2–3 CCAA)
- Head coach: Sheldon Harden (1st season)
- Home stadium: Mustang Stadium

1962 California Collegiate Athletic Association football standings
	Conf.					Overall
Team	W		L		T	W		L		T
San Diego State $	5	–	0	–	0	8	–	2	–	0
Fresno State	4	–	1	–	0	7	–	3	–	0
Long Beach State	2	–	3	–	0	5	–	5	–	0
Cal Poly	2	–	3	–	0	4	–	5	–	0
UC Santa Barbara	2	–	3	–	0	2	–	8	–	0
Los Angeles State	0	–	5	–	0	2	–	8	–	0
Valley State	0	–	0	–	0	3	–	6	–	0
$ – Conference champion; Games with Valley State did not count in the conference standings.

The 1962 Cal Poly Mustangs football team represented California Polytechnic State College—now known as California Polytechnic State University, San Luis Obispo—as a member of the California Collegiate Athletic Association (CCAA) during the 1962 NCAA College Division football season. Led by first-year head coach Sheldon Harden, Cal Poly compiled an overall record of 4–5 with a mark of 2–3 in conference play, placing in a three-way tie for third in the CCAA. The Mustangs played home games at Mustang Stadium in San Luis Obispo, California.

== Schedule ==
Date	Opponent	Site	Result	Attendance	Source
September 22	San Diego Marines (Note: The Marine Corps Recruit Depot (MCRD) in San Diego fielded a team that played against colleges and other military teams from 1922 to 1964.)*	?; San Diego, CA	L 0–35		
September 29	San Diego State	Mustang Stadium; San Luis Obispo, CA	L 14–35		
October 6	Valley State*	Mustang Stadium; San Luis Obispo, CA	W 38–7	2,500	
October 13	at No. 6 Fresno State	Ratcliffe Stadium; Fresno, CA	L 6–51	11,301	
October 20	Arizona State–Flagstaff*	Mustang Stadium; San Luis Obispo, CA	L 20–21	4,000	
October 27	at Long Beach State	Veterans Stadium; Long Beach, CA	L 6–14		
November 3	Los Angeles State	Mustang Stadium; San Luis Obispo, CA	W 28–0		
November 9	at Santa Clara*	Buck Shaw Stadium; Santa Clara, CA	W 41–22	5,000	
November 17	at UC Santa Barbara	La Playa Stadium; Santa Barbara, CA	W 12–2	1,500	
*Non-conference game; Rankings from AP Poll released prior to the game

== Team players in the NFL ==
No Cal Poly Mustangs were selected in the 1963 NFL draft.

The following finished their college career in 1962, were not drafted, but played in the NFL.

Player	Position	First NFL team
Fred Whittingham	Linebacker, guard	1963 Los Angeles Rams
