= 1962 UC Santa Barbara Gauchos football team =

American college football season

1962 UC Santa Barbara Gauchos football
- Conference: California Collegiate Athletic Association
- Record: 2–8 (2–3 CCAA)
- Head coach: Bill Hammer (3rd season)
- Home stadium: La Playa Stadium

1962 California Collegiate Athletic Association football standings
	Conf.					Overall
Team	W		L		T	W		L		T
San Diego State $	5	–	0	–	0	8	–	2	–	0
Fresno State	4	–	1	–	0	7	–	3	–	0
Long Beach State	2	–	3	–	0	5	–	5	–	0
Cal Poly	2	–	3	–	0	4	–	5	–	0
UC Santa Barbara	2	–	3	–	0	2	–	8	–	0
Los Angeles State	0	–	5	–	0	2	–	8	–	0
Valley State	0	–	0	–	0	3	–	6	–	0
$ – Conference champion; Games with Valley State did not count in the conference standings.

The 1962 UC Santa Barbara Gauchos football team represented University of California, Santa Barbara (UCSB) as a member of the California Collegiate Athletic Association (CCAA) during the 1962 NCAA College Division football season. Led by third-year head coach Bill Hammer, the Gauchos compiled an overall record of 2–8 with a mark of 2–3 in conference play, placing in a three-way tie for third in the CCAA. The team played home games at La Playa Stadium in Santa Barbara, California.

This was the final season in which UC Santa Barbara competed in the CCAA.

== Schedule ==
Date	Opponent	Site	Result	Attendance	Source
September 14	San Francisco State*	La Playa Stadium; Santa Barbara, CA	L 14–16	8,000	
September 22	at Whittier*	Hadley Field; Whittier, CA	L 0–34	4,500–5,000	
September 28	Fresno State	La Playa Stadium; Santa Barbara, CA	L 0–37	6,000	
October 6	at Los Angeles State	L.A. State Stadium; Los Angeles, CA	W 23–13	2,978	
October 13	at Long Beach State	Veterans Stadium; Long Beach, CA	W 7–6	4,004	
October 19	San Diego State	La Playa Stadium; Santa Barbara, CA	L 8–46	4,000	
October 27	Valley State*	La Playa Stadium; Santa Barbara, CA	L 6–13	1,400–6,500	
November 3	vs. UC Davis (Note: The game against UC Davis was part of an "All-UC Doubleheader" that was held annually from 1948 to 1963. The other game of the double-header was California vs. UCLA. The games were always held at the home stadium of either Cal or UCLA.)*	California Memorial Stadium; Berkeley, CA	L 0–13	2,000–6,000	
November 10	Redlands*	La Playa Stadium; Santa Barbara, CA	L 8–14	1,300	
November 17	at Cal Poly	La Playa Stadium; Santa Barbara, CA	L 2–12	1,500	
*Non-conference game
