= 1962 Fresno State Bulldogs football team =

American college football season

1962 Fresno State Bulldogs football
- Conference: California Collegiate Athletic Association

Ranking
- Coaches: No. 7 (UPI small college)
- AP: No. 8 (AP small college)
- Record: 7–3 (4–1 CCAA)
- Head coach: Cecil Coleman (4th season)
- Home stadium: Ratcliffe Stadium

1962 California Collegiate Athletic Association football standings
	Conf.					Overall
Team	W		L		T	W		L		T
San Diego State $	5	–	0	–	0	8	–	2	–	0
Fresno State	4	–	1	–	0	7	–	3	–	0
Long Beach State	2	–	3	–	0	5	–	5	–	0
Cal Poly	2	–	3	–	0	4	–	5	–	0
UC Santa Barbara	2	–	3	–	0	2	–	8	–	0
Los Angeles State	0	–	5	–	0	2	–	8	–	0
Valley State	0	–	0	–	0	3	–	6	–	0
$ – Conference champion; Games with Valley State did not count in the conference standings.

The 1962 Fresno State Bulldogs football team represented Fresno State College—now known as California State University, Fresno—as a member of the California Collegiate Athletic Association (CCAA) during the 1962 NCAA College Division football season. Led by fourth-year head coach Cecil Coleman, Fresno State compiled an overall record of 7–3 with a mark of 4–1 in conference play, placing second in the CCAA. The Bulldogs played home games at Ratcliffe Stadium on the campus of Fresno City College in Fresno, California.

Fresno State started the year ranked No. 1 in the AP Small-College Football Poll. They never dropped out of the top 10 all season, finishing No. 7 in the final UPI poll and No. 8 in the final AP poll.

== Schedule ==
Date	Opponent	Rank	Site	Result	Attendance	Source
September 22	Whitworth*		Ratcliffe Stadium; Fresno, CA	W 48–7	11,339	
September 28	at UC Santa Barbara*		La Playa Stadium; Santa Barbara, CA	W 37–0	6,000	
October 6	Abilene Christian*	No. 1	Shotwell Stadium; Abilene, TX	L 14–26	8,500	
October 13	Cal Poly*	No. 6	Ratcliffe Stadium; Fresno, CA	W 51–6	11,301	
October 20	at Los Angeles State	No. 2	L.A. State Stadium; Los Angeles, CA	W 34–0	4,630	
October 27	at San Diego State	No. 3	Aztec Bowl; San Diego, CA (rivalry)	L 26–29	13,000	
November 3	Long Beach State	No. 10	Ratcliffe Stadium; Fresno, CA	W 50–0	8,092	
November 10	at San Jose State	No. 9	Spartan Stadium; San Jose, CA (rivalry)	W 20–14	15,750–16,000	
November 17	Pacific (CA)*	No. 6	Ratcliffe Stadium; Fresno, CA	W 18–13	10,973	
November 24	at Montana State*	No. 9	Ratcliffe Stadium; Fresno, CA	L 20–21	10,425	
*Non-conference game; Rankings from AP Poll released prior to the game

== Team players in the NFL/AFL ==
The following were selected in the 1963 NFL draft.

Player	Position	Round	Overall	NFL team
Jan Barrett	End	6	84	Green Bay Packers
Monte Day	Tackle	9	118	Chicago Bears
Paul Wicker	Tackle	13	174	Dallas Cowboys
Herman Hamp	Back	19	266	Green Bay Packers

The following were selected in the 1963 AFL draft.

Player	Position	Round	Overall	AFL team
Jan Barrett	End	9	72	Kansas City Chiefs
Jon Anabo	Quarterback	23	177	Oakland Raiders
Monte Day	Tackle	26	205	Denver Broncos
Herman Hamp	Halfback	29	226	San Diego Chargers
Paul Wicker	Tackle	29	227	New York Jets
