= Mississippi Valley State Delta Devils football =

College football team

2026 Mississippi Valley State Delta Devils football team
- First season: 1953; 73 years ago
- Athletic director: Alecia Shields-Gadson
- Head coach: Terrell Buckley; 2nd season, 2–10 (.167)
- Location: Itta Bena, Mississippi
- Stadium: Rice–Totten Stadium (capacity: 10,000)
- Conference: SWAC
- Division: East
- Colors: Forest green and white
- All-time record: 249–333–10 (.429)
- Fight song: Devil's Gun
- Mascot: Delta Devil
- Marching band: Mean Green Marching (Music) Machine
- Website: mvsusports.com

The Mississippi Valley State Delta Devils are the college football team representing the Mississippi Valley State University. The Delta Devils play in the NCAA Division I Football Championship Subdivision as a member of the Southwestern Athletic Conference (SWAC). Jerry Rice and Deacon Jones, considered two of the greatest American football players of all time, spent their college days playing for the team. Mississippi Valley State has never won a conference championship in their history and are one of two SWAC teams to have never competed in the SWAC Football Championship Game.

== History ==
=== Classifications ===
- 1956–1972: NCAA College Division
- 1973–1978: NCAA Division II
- 1979–present: NCAA Division I–AA/FCS

=== Conference memberships ===
- 1953: Independent
- 1954–1963: South Central Athletic Conference
- 1964–1968: NCAA College Division independent
- 1969–present: Southwestern Athletic Conference

== NCAA I-AA/FCS playoff results ==
The Delta Devils have appeared in one FCS playoff game with a record of 0-1.

Year	Round	Opponent	Result	Source
1984	First Round	Louisiana Tech	L 19–66	

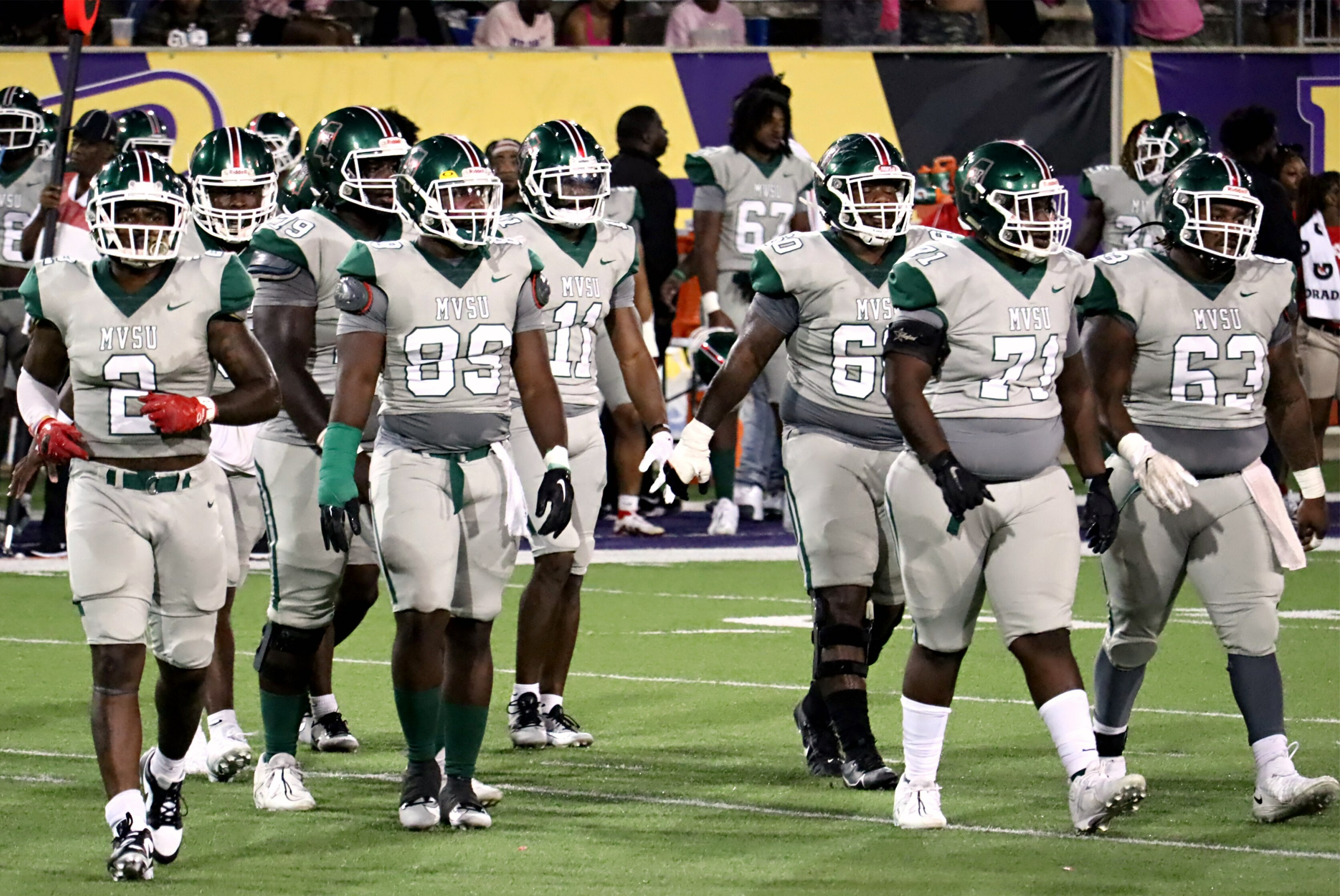
Delta Devils football players during a game in October 2023

== College Football Hall of Fame members ==
- Doug Porter
- Jerry Rice
- Willie Totten

== Alumni in the NFL ==
Over 25 Mississippi Valley State alumni have played in the National Football League (NFL), including:

- Ashley Ambrose
- Vincent Brown
- Carl Byrum
- Parnell Dickinson
- Ricky Feacher
- James Haynes
- Deacon Jones
- Jerry Rice
- Sam Washington
- Ted Washington Sr.
- Danta Whitaker

== Retired numbers ==
Mississippi Valley State Delta Devils retired numbers
No.	Player	Pos.	Tenure	Ref.
10	Willie Totten	QB	1981–1985	
18	Parnell Dickinson	QB	1972–1975	
56	Terry Houzah	LB	1995–1998	
66	Vincent Brown	LB	1984–1987	
88	Jerry Rice	WR	1981–1984	

== Future non-conference opponents ==
Announced schedules as of November 18, 2026

2027	2028
at Kennesaw State	at Louisiana Tech
at West Florida	
