= 1961 All-SEC football team =

American college football all-star team

The 1961 All-SEC football team consists of American football players selected to the All-Southeastern Conference (SEC) chosen by various selectors for the 1961 college football season.

== All-SEC selections ==
=== Ends ===
- Tom Hutchinson, Kentucky (AP-1, UPI-1)
- Dave Edwards, Auburn (AP-1, UPI-1)
- Ralph Smith, Ole Miss (AP-2, UPI-2)
- Johnny Baker, Miss. St. (AP-2, UPI-2)
- Tommy Brooker, Alabama (AP-3, UPI-3)
- Gene Sykes, LSU (AP-3)
- Dave Gash, Kentucky (UPI-3)

=== Tackles ===
- Billy Neighbors, Alabama (AP-1, UPI-1)
- Jim Dunaway, Ole Miss (AP-1, UPI-1)
- Pete Case, Georgia (AP-2, UPI-1)
- Billy Booth, LSU (AP-2, UPI-3)
- Jim Beaver, Florida (AP-3, UPI-2)
- Ernie Colquette, Tulane (AP-3)
- Billy Wilson, Auburn (UPI-3)

=== Guards ===
- Roy Winston, LSU (AP-1, UPI-1)
- Dave Watson, Georgia Tech (AP-1, UPI-1)
- Harold Erickson, Georgia Tech (AP-2)
- Monk Guillot, LSU (AP-2)
- Rufus Guthrie, Georgia Tech (UPI-2)
- Bookie Bolin, Ole Miss (UPI-2)
- Billy Ray Jones, Ole Miss (AP-3, UPI-3)
- Howard Benton, Miss. St. (AP-3)
- Gus Gonzales, Tulane (UPI-3)

=== Centers ===
- Mike Lucci, Tennessee (AP-1, UPI-2)
- Lee Roy Jordan, Alabama (AP-2, UPI-1)
- Wayne Frazier, Auburn (AP-3)
- Irv Goode, Kentucky (UPI-3)

=== Quarterbacks ===
- Pat Trammell, Alabama (AP-1, UPI-1)
- Doug Elmore, Ole Miss (AP-2, UPI-2)
- Hank Lesesne, Vanderbilt (AP-3)

=== Halfbacks ===
- Billy Ray Adams, Ole Miss (AP-1, UPI-1)
- Mike Fracchia, Alabama (AP-1, UPI-1)
- Jerry Stovall, LSU (College Football Hall of Fame) (AP-2, UPI-1)
- Mallon Faircloth, Tennessee (AP-2, UPI-3)
- Billy Williamson, Georgia Tech (AP-3, UPI-2)
- Don Goodman, Florida (AP-3, UPI-3)
- Jerry Woolum, Kentucky (UPI-3)
- Bobby Hunt, Auburn (UPI-3)

=== Fullbacks ===
- Wendell Harris, LSU (AP-1, UPI-2)
- Bill McKenny, Georgia (AP-2, UPI-2)
- Earl Gros, LSU (AP-3)

== Key ==
AP = Associated Press

UPI = United Press International

Bold = Consensus first-team selection by both AP and UPI

== See also ==
- 1961 College Football All-America Team
