= Larry Dupree =

American football player (1943–2014)

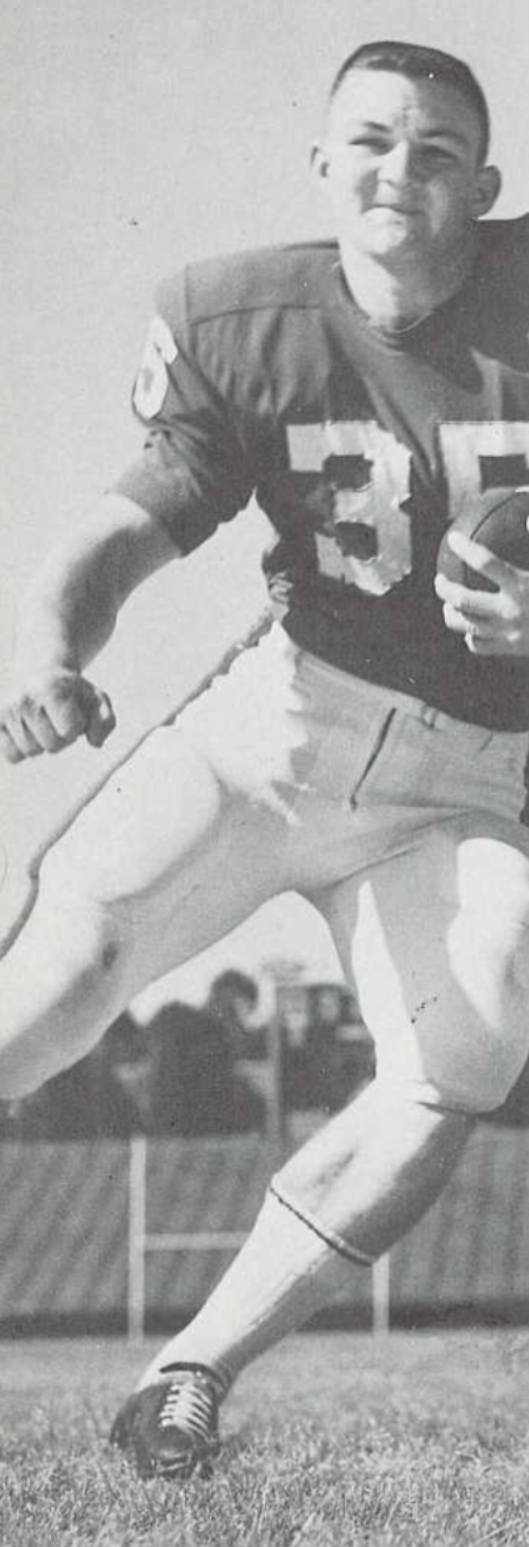
- Dupree from 1965 Seminole yearbook

No. 35
- Positions: Halfback, Fullback

Personal information
- Born: December 22, 1943; Baker County, Florida, U.S.
- Died: June 15, 2014 (aged 70); Macclenny, Florida, U.S.

Career information
- High school: Baker County
- College: Florida (1962–1964)

Awards and highlights
- First-team All-American (1964); 3× First-team All-SEC (1962, 1963, 1964); Florida–Georgia Hall of Fame

Lawrence Wallace Dupree (December 22, 1943 – June 15, 2014) was an American college football player. He played at the halfback and fullback positions for the Florida Gators football team of the University of Florida. In 1964, he became the first Florida Gators running back to be selected as a first-team All-American. He was also the first Florida player to receive first-team All-SEC honors in three seasons.

== Early life ==
Dupree was born in 1943 to Wallace and Dorothy Thrift Dupree. He graduated from Baker County High School in Glen St. Mary, Florida.

== University of Florida ==
Dupree enrolled at the University of Florida in Gainesville, Florida, where he played at the halfback and fullback positions for coach Ray Graves's Florida Gators football team from 1962 to 1964. In 1962, he established himself as a star by gaining 111 yards and scoring two touchdowns in the Florida–Georgia game. For the 1962 season, he gained 604 yards on 113 carried (5.4 yards per carry), scored seven touchdowns, and was the only sophomore to be named to the All-SEC team. He was also named Playboy magazine's All-America team in 1962.

As a junior in 1963, Dupree's wife delivered the couple's first child stillborn two days before the Georgia game. After staying up all night, Dupree received a police escort on game day. He gained 74 rushing yards and 34 receiving yards to lead the Gators to a 21-14 victory over Georgia.

After his senior year, he was selected by the American Football Coaches Association (AFCA) as a first-team player on its 1964 College Football All-America Team. In April 1965, his home town of Macclenny, Florida, held a parade and "Larry Dupree Day" with 3,000 persons attending in honor of the town's All-American. At the event, Florida coach Ray Graves said he could take no credit for Dupree who was "simply born great," and state senator Walter Fraser called Dupree "one of the greatest young men the state has ever produced." In brief comments to the crowd, Dupree called it "the greatest day of my life", expressed thanks to coach Graves, and called Macclenny "the greatest place in the world to live."

Dupree was the first Florida running back to receive first-team All-America honors. He was also the first Florida player to receive first-team All-Southeastern Conference (SEC) honors three times. In a series of articles written by the sports editors of The Gainesville Sun in 2006, Dupree was ranked as No. 33 of the 100 greatest players in the first 100 years Gators football history.

== Later life ==
After graduating from the University of Florida, Dupree returned to Baker County, Florida, where he lived his entire life. For many years, he was the manager of an Oldsmobile car dealership in Jacksonville.

Dupree was inducted into the University of Florida Athletic Hall of Fame as a "Gator Great" in 1968. In 2014, after being diagnosed with lung cancer, Dupree died of a heart attack at Ed Fraser Memorial Hospital in Macclenny.

== See also ==
- 1964 College Football All-America Team
- Florida Gators football, 1960–69
- List of Florida Gators football All-Americans
- List of University of Florida Athletic Hall of Fame members
