= Mike Boone =

American football player (born 1995)

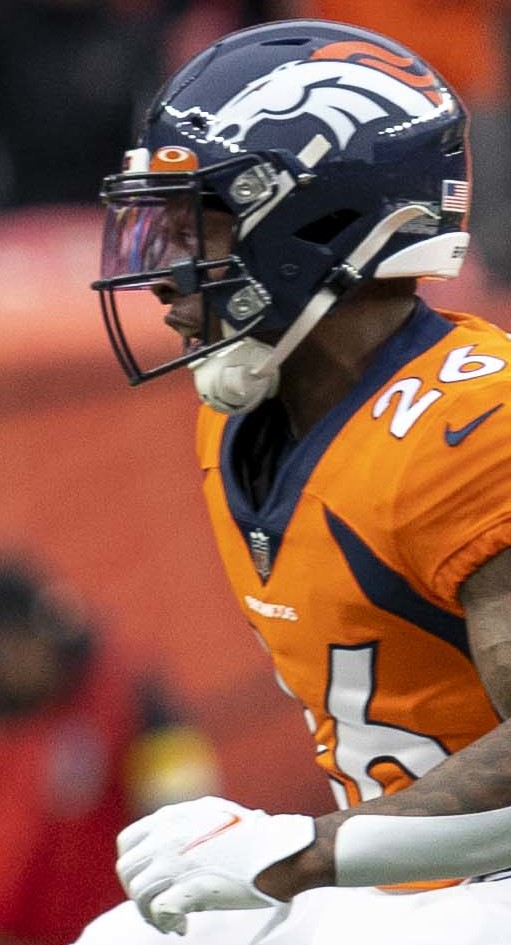
- Boone with the Denver Broncos in 2021

Profile
- Position: Running back

Personal information
- Born: June 30, 1995 (age 31); Macclenny, Florida, U.S.
- Listed height: 5 ft 10 in (1.78 m)
- Listed weight: 206 lb (93 kg)

Career information
- High school: Baker County (Glen St. Mary, Florida)
- College: Cincinnati (2014–2017)
- NFL draft: 2018: undrafted

Career history
- Minnesota Vikings (2018–2020); Denver Broncos (2021–2022); Houston Texans (2023); Carolina Panthers (2023–2024); Miami Dolphins (2025)*
- * Offseason or practice squad member only

Career NFL statistics as of 2024
- Rushing yards: 590
- Rushing average: 5.0
- Rushing touchdowns: 4
- Receptions: 26
- Receiving yards: 184
- Stats at Pro Football Reference

Mike Boone (born June 30, 1995) is an American professional football running back. He played college football for the Cincinnati Bearcats and signed with the Minnesota Vikings as an undrafted free agent in 2018.

== Early life ==
Boone attended and played high school football as a wide receiver at Baker County High School in Glen St. Mary, Florida. As a senior in 2013, he helped lead Baker County to a 7–3 record, catching 57 passes for 1,068 yards and 18 touchdowns, including 211 receiving yards in a single game which set a school record. Boone also lettered in basketball and track. He committed to the University of Cincinnati, choosing the Bearcats over FIU.

== College career ==
Boone attended and played college football at the University of Cincinnati from 2014 to 2017. On October 24, 2014, against South Florida, he had 19 carries for 212 rushing yards and one touchdown. In the 2015 season, he led the American Athletic Conference in rushing yards per attempt.

=== Statistics ===
Year	School	Conf	Class	Pos	G	Rushing				Receiving			
Year	School	Conf	Class	Pos	G	Att	Yds	Avg	TD	Rec	Yds	Avg	TD
2014	Cincinnati	American	FR	RB	9	101	650	6.4	9	6	62	10.3	0
2015	Cincinnati	American	SO	RB	11	104	749	7.2	9	15	108	7.2	0
2016	Cincinnati	American	JR	RB	9	105	388	3.7	2	20	249	12.5	0
2017	Cincinnati	American	SR	RB	10	110	463	4.2	4	24	177	7.4	1
Career						420	2,250	5.4	24	65	596	9.2	1

== Professional career ==
Pre-draft measurables
Height	Weight	Arm length	Hand span	40-yard dash	10-yard split	20-yard split	20-yard shuttle	Three-cone drill	Vertical jump	Broad jump	Bench press
5 ft 9 7/8 in (1.77 m)	206 lb (93 kg)	30 3/8 in (0.77 m)	9 1/2 in (0.24 m)	4.44 s	1.60 s	2.58 s	4.38 s	6.95 s	42 in (1.07 m)	11 ft 7 in (3.53 m)	25 reps
All values from Cincinnati Pro Day

=== Minnesota Vikings ===
Boone signed with the Minnesota Vikings as an undrafted free agent on April 30, 2018. After an impressive preseason where he finished fourth in the league with 195 rushing yards, he made the Vikings 53-man roster and made his NFL debut in Week 3 against the Buffalo Bills. In the 27–6 loss, he had two carries for 11 rushing yards. He finished his rookie season with 11 carries for 47 yards.

In Week 15 of the 2019 season against the Los Angeles Chargers, starting running back Dalvin Cook left the game with a shoulder injury which increased Boone's playing time as a result. During the game, Boone rushed 13 times for 56 yards and two touchdowns in the 39–10 win. In Week 17 against the Chicago Bears, Boone rushed 17 times for 148 yards and a touchdown during the 21–19 loss. Overall, Boone finished the 2019 season with 273 rushing yards and three rushing touchdowns.

In Week 4 of the 2020 season against the Houston Texans, Boone forced a fumble on punt returner DeAndre Carter which was recovered by the Vikings during the 31–23 win. Boone was named the NFC Special Teams Player of the Week for his performance in Week 4.

=== Denver Broncos ===
On March 18, 2021, Boone signed a two-year contract with the Denver Broncos. He was placed on injured reserve on September 1, 2021, to start the season. He was activated on October 16.

After suffering an ankle injury, Boone was placed on injured reserve on October 24, 2022. He was activated on December 3, but placed back on injured reserve 10 days later after suffering an ankle injury in Week 14.

=== Houston Texans ===
On March 17, 2023, Boone signed a two-year contract with the Houston Texans. He entered the 2023 season third on the depth chart. After only 12 touches through 14 games, he was released on December 18, 2023.

=== Carolina Panthers ===
On January 2, 2024, Boone was signed to the practice squad of the Carolina Panthers. He signed a reserve/future contract on January 8, 2024.

On August 27, 2024, Boone was waived by the Panthers and re-signed to the practice squad. He was promoted to the active roster on September 10. He was released on October 8 and re-signed to the practice squad two days later. He was promoted back to the active roster on December 28.

=== Miami Dolphins ===
On August 11, 2025, Boone signed with the Miami Dolphins. He was released on August 26 as part of final roster cuts.
