= Johnny Baker (linebacker) =

American football player (born 1941)

No. 84
- Positions: Linebacker, Tight end

Personal information
- Born: March 15, 1941 (age 85); Camden, Alabama, U.S.
- Listed height: 6 ft 3 in (1.91 m)
- Listed weight: 230 lb (104 kg)

Career information
- High school: Meridian (Meridian, Mississippi)
- College: Mississippi State
- NFL draft: 1963: 3rd round, 37th overall pick
- AFL draft: 1963: 7th round, 54th overall pick

Career history
- Houston Oilers (1963-1966); San Diego Chargers (1967)

Awards and highlights
- First-team All-SEC (1962); Second-team All-SEC (1961)

Career AFL statistics
- Fumble recoveries: 1
- Interceptions: 2
- Receptions: 2
- Receiving yards: 18
- Total touchdowns: 1
- Stats at Pro Football Reference

John Hendrix Baker, III (born March 15, 1941) is an American former professional football player who was a linebacker and tight end in the American Football League (AFL). He played college football for the Mississippi State Bulldogs as a linebacker and an offensive end. He played in the AFL for the Houston Oilers from 1963 through 1966 and the San Diego Chargers in 1967.

== Personal life ==
Baker married Carla Swanson, a member of the Swanson TV dinners family, on June 22, 1968, at Kountze Memorial Lutheran Church in Omaha, Nebraska. He has a daughter named Cara and three sons : Jason, Jacob, and Joshua. Joshua pitched in the College World Series for the Rice Owls. Baker is the father-in-law of Major League Baseball player Lance Berkman.

== See also ==
- List of American Football League players
