= Dave Watson (American football) =

American football player (1941–2021)

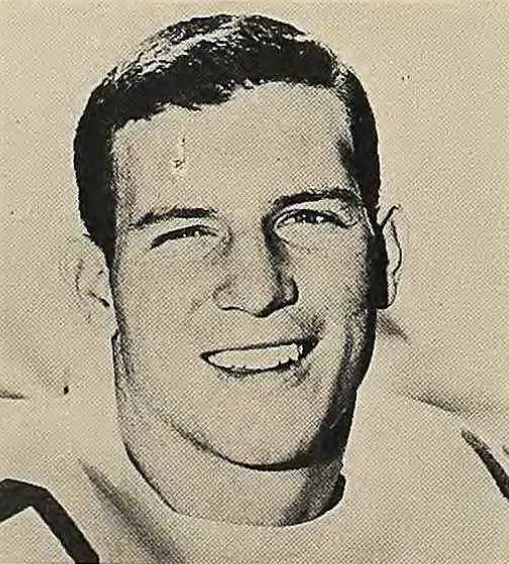

No. 67, 62, 56
- Position: Guard

Personal information
- Born: January 5, 1941; Barbour County, Alabama, U.S.
- Died: March 13, 2021 (aged 80); Atlanta, Georgia, U.S.
- Listed height: 6 ft 1 in (1.85 m)
- Listed weight: 245 lb (111 kg)

Career information
- High school: Eufaula (Eufaula, Alabama)
- College: Georgia Tech (1959–1962)
- NFL draft: 1963: 9th round, 122nd overall pick
- AFL draft: 1963: 11th round, 87th overall pick

Career history
- Boston Patriots (1963–1964); Edmonton Eskimos (1965)

Awards and highlights
- 2× Second-team All-American (1961, 1962); 2× First-team All-SEC (1961, 1962)

Career AFL statistics
- Games played: 28
- Games started: 2
- Stats at Pro Football Reference

Carl David Watson (January 6, 1941 – March 13, 2021) was an American professional football player who was an offensive lineman for two seasons for the Boston Patriots. He was selected 122nd overall in the ninth round of the 1963 NFL draft. (Note: Sources differ: Baltimore Colts or Chicago Bears)

== Biography ==
Watson is considered one of the best athletes in the history of Eufaula High School where he starred for the Tigers in football and basketball (1954–1958). He played under legendary Eufaula High coaches A. W. "Bill" Buchanan in football (the Tigers record was 27–9 during Watson's playing career at Eufaula) and basketball under Jack Powell where he played on a district championship team during his senior year. Watson was a two time All-State selection in high school, as a two-way lineman, and was a three time All-SEC performer at Georgia Tech (1959–1963). He was chosen AP lineman of the week in 1961 for his outstanding play against Duke University. In the game, he recorded 12 individual tackles, numerous assists, and a fumble recovery while playing on both sides of the ball. Watson was chosen Most Valuable Lineman in the 1962–1963 Hula Bowl college all-star game and is a member of the All Time Gator Bowl team.

In 1962, Watson played in one of Georgia Tech's biggest wins in their storied football history. The Bobby Dodd coached Jackets upset Bear Bryant's Alabama Crimson Tide, in Atlanta, on November 14 of that year. The Tide was ranked #1 in the country and led by All-America quarterback Joe Namath. The 7–6 Jackets' victory gave Alabama its only loss of the year and ended the Tide's quest for a second straight national championship in what many Tech fans consider the greatest game ever played at Historic Grant Field.

He went on to play professional football with the Boston Patriots in the old American Football League (1963–1964) and the Edmonton Eskimos of the Canadian Football League (1965). He is a member of the Wiregrass Sports Hall of Fame (the Wiregrass is a region in southeast Alabama, southwest Georgia, and northwest Florida; it is also known as the peanut growing capital of the world). After his playing career ended he returned to Georgia Tech and earned a master's degree in Electrical Engineering. Dave had three children, Lynne, Neal, and Amy. He retired and lived near Pine Mountain, Georgia until his death in 2021.
