= Cooper Hodges =

American football player (born 2000)

Profile
- Position: Guard

Personal information
- Born: July 13, 2000 (age 26); Glen St. Mary, Florida, U.S.
- Listed height: 6 ft 4 in (1.93 m)
- Listed weight: 305 lb (138 kg)

Career information
- High school: Baker County (Glen St. Mary)
- College: Appalachian State (2018–2022)
- NFL draft: 2023: 7th round, 226th overall pick

Career history
- Jacksonville Jaguars (2023–2025)

Awards and highlights
- 2× First-team All-Sun Belt (2021, 2022); 2× Second-team All-Sun Belt (2019, 2020)

Career NFL statistics as of 2025
- Games played: 9
- Games started: 1
- Stats at Pro Football Reference

Cooper Hodges (born July 13, 2000) is an American professional football guard. He played college football for the Appalachian State Mountaineers and was selected in the seventh round of the 2023 NFL draft by the Jacksonville Jaguars.

== Early life ==
Hodges was born on July 13, 2000, and grew up in Glen St. Mary, Florida. He attended Baker County High School, being a Super 24 pick and helping the team reach the state championship match in his senior season. A two-star recruit, Hodges committed to play college football for the Appalachian State Mountaineers.

== College career ==
As a true freshman at Appalachian State in 2018, Hodges redshirted and saw no action due to an injury. The following season, he became their starting right tackle and was named second-team all-conference after starting all 14 games. In 2020, Hodges started all 11 games and was named second-team all-conference for the second consecutive year.

Hodges continued as a starter in 2021 and was named first-team All-Sun Belt Conference. As a senior in 2022, he appeared in 12 games and earned third-team All-America honors from Pro Football Focus, additionally being an All-Sun Belt choice for the fourth-straight season. He finished his stint at Appalachian State with 51 consecutive starts, over 3,500 snaps played and only seven sacks allowed.

== Professional career ==
Pre-draft measurables
Height	Weight	Arm length	Hand span	40-yard dash	10-yard split	20-yard split	20-yard shuttle	Three-cone drill	Vertical jump	Broad jump	Bench press
6 ft 3 1/2 in (1.92 m)	311 lb (141 kg)	33 in (0.84 m)	9 in (0.23 m)	5.11 s	1.90 s	2.88 s	4.71 s	7.90 s	29.0 in (0.74 m)	9 ft 0 in (2.74 m)	29 reps

Hodges was selected in the seventh round (226th overall) of the 2023 NFL draft by his hometown Jacksonville Jaguars, who originally acquired the pick in a trade with the Carolina Panthers in exchange for Laviska Shenault. Although a right tackle at Appalachian State, he was announced as a guard when selected. He was placed on injured reserve on August 31, 2023.

On June 4, 2025, Hodges was waived by the Jaguars following a failed physical and reverted to the Reserve/Physically Unable to Perform (PUP) list the following day.

On April 17, 2026, the Jaguars waived Hodges.
