= Lee Jordan =

Lee Jordan may refer to:

- Lee Jordan (Harry Potter), fictional character in Harry Potter
- Lee Roy Jordan (1941–2025), American football player
