= Baker County School District =

Baker County School District or Baker County Schools may refer to:

- Baker County School District (Florida)
- Baker County School District (Georgia)
