= 1962 All-America college football team =

Official list of the best college football players of 1962

The 1962 All-America college football team is composed of college football players who were selected as All-Americans by various organizations and writers that chose All-America college football teams in 1962. The six selectors recognized by the NCAA as "official" for the 1962 season are (1) the American Football Coaches Association (AFCA), (2) the Associated Press (AP), (3) the Football Writers Association of America (FWAA), (4) the Newspaper Enterprise Association (NEA), (5) the Sporting News, and (6) the United Press International (UPI).

== Consensus All-Americans ==
For the year 1962, the NCAA recognizes six published All-American teams as "official" designations for purposes of its consensus determinations. The following chart identifies the NCAA-recognized consensus All-Americans and displays which first-team designations they received.

Name	Position	School	Number	Official	Other
Bobby Bell	Tackle	Minnesota	6/6	AFCA, AP, FWAA, NEA, SN, UPI	Time, WC
Lee Roy Jordan	Center	Alabama	6/6	AFCA, AP, FWAA, NEA, SN, UPI	Time, WC
Terry Baker	Quarterback	Oregon State	6/6	AFCA, AP, FWAA, NEA, SN, UPI	Time, WC
Jerry Stovall	Halfback	LSU	6/6	AFCA, AP, FWAA, NEA, SN, UPI	Time, WC
Johnny Treadwell	Guard	Texas	6/6	AFCA, AP, FWAA, NEA, SN, UPI	WC
Pat Richter	End	Wisconsin	5/6	AFCA, AP, FWAA, SN, UPI	Time, WC
Hal Bedsole	End	USC	5/6	AFCA, FWAA, NEA, SN, UPI	WC
George Saimes	Fullback	Michigan State	5/6	AFCA, AP, FWAA, SN, UPI	WC
Jim Dunaway	Tackle	Ole Miss	3/6	NEA, SN, UPI	Time, WC
Jack Cvercko	Guard	Northwestern	2/6	SN, UPI	Time, WC
Mel Renfro	Halfback	Oregon	2/6	SN, UPI	Time, WC

== All-American selections for 1962 ==
=== Ends ===
- Pat Richter, Wisconsin (AFCA-1, AP-1, FWAA, NEA-3, SN-1, UPI-1, Time, CP-1, WC)
- Hal Bedsole, Southern California (AFCA-1, AP-3, FWAA, NEA-1, SN-1, UPI-1, CP-1, WC)
- Dave Robinson, Penn State (AFCA-2, AP-1, NEA-1, FWAA, SN-2, Time, CP-3)
- Conrad Hitchler, Missouri (AP-3, FWAA, NEA-2, UPI-3)
- Hugh Campbell, Washington State (AFCA-2, AP-2, NEA-3, SN-2, UPI-2, CP-3)
- Tom Hutchinson, Kentucky (AFCA-3, AP-2, SN-3, UPI-3)
- Vern Burke, Oregon State (AFCA-3, NEA-2, UPI-2, CP-2)
- Woody Dabbs, Ole Miss (SN-3)
- Art Graham, Boston College (CP-2)

=== Tackles ===
- Bobby Bell, Minnesota (AFCA-1, AP-1, FWAA, NEA-1, SN-1, UPI-1, Time, CP-1, WC)
- Jim Dunaway, Mississippi (AFCA-2, NEA-1, SN-1, UPI-1, Time, CP-3, WC)
- Don Brumm, Purdue (AFCA-3 [guard], AP-1, FWAA, NEA-2, UPI-3)
- Steve Barnett, Oregon (AFCA-1, FWAA, NEA-3, SN-3, UPI-2, CP-2)
- Fred Miller, LSU (AFCA-3, AP-3, FWAA, NEA-2, SN-2, UPI-3)
- Art Gregory, Duke (AP-2, CP-3)
- Ray Schoenke, SMU (AP-2)
- Bob Vogel, Ohio State (AFCA-2, SN-2, UPI-2)
- Scott Appleton, Texas (AFCA-3)
- Tom Nomina, Miami (Ohio) (AP-3)
- Chuck Sieminski, Penn State (NEA-3, SN-3, CP-1)
- Charles Johnson, Villanova (CP-2)

=== Guards ===
- Johnny Treadwell, Texas (AFCA-1, AP-1, FWAA, NEA-1, SN-1, UPI-1, CP-1, WC)
- Jack Cvercko, Northwestern (AFCA-2, AP-3, NEA-2, SN-1, UPI-1, Time, CP-1, WC)
- Rufus Guthrie, Georgia Tech (AFCA-1, AP-2, FWAA, NEA-2, UPI-2, CP-2)
- Jean Berry, Duke (FWAA)
- Leon Cross, Oklahoma (AP-2, FWAA, NEA-3, SN-3, CP-3)
- Damon Bame, USC (AP-1, UPI-3)
- Ed Budde, Michigan State (Time)
- Tom Hertz, Missouri (AFCA-3, NEA-3, SN-2, UPI-2)
- Dave Watson, Georgia Tech (SN-2, UPI-3)
- Gene McDowell, Florida State (AP-3)
- Steve Underwood, Wisconsin (SN-3)
- Don Dickson, Ole Miss (CP-2)
- Bob Lehman, Notre Dame (CP-3)

=== Centers ===
- Lee Roy Jordan, Alabama (AFCA-1, AP-1, FWAA, NEA-1, SN-1, UPI-1, Time, CP-1, WC)
- Donald McKinnon, Dartmouth (AFCA-3, AP-2, NEA-1 [guard], FWAA, SN-3, UPI-3, CP-2)
- Dave Behrman, Michigan State (AFCA-2, SN-2, UPI-2)
- Ray Mansfield, Washington (AFCA-2 [guard], AP-3)
- Wayne Lee, Oklahoma (NEA-2)
- Billie Joe Armstrong, Ohio State (NEA-3, CP-3)

=== Quarterbacks ===
- Terry Baker, Oregon State (AP-1, NEA-1, UPI-1, WC, AFCA-1, FWAA, SN-1, Time, CP-1)
- George Mira, Miami (Fla) (AFCA-2, AP-1, FWAA, SN-2, UPI-2)
- Glynn Griffing, Mississippi (AP-2, FWAA, NEA-2, SN-3, CP-2)
- Tom Myers, Northwestern (AFCA-3)
- Daryle Lamonica, Notre Dame (AP-3)
- Bill King, Dartmouth (NEA-3)
- Billy Moore, Arkansas (UPI-3, CP-3)
- Billy Lothridge, Georgia Tech (UPI-3)

=== Halfbacks ===
- Jerry Stovall, LSU (AFCA-1, AP-1, FWAA, NEA-1, SN-1, UPI-1, Time, CP-1, WC)
- Mel Renfro, Oregon (AFCA-2, AP-2, NEA-2, SN-1, UPI-1, Time, CP-1, WC)
- Billy Moore, Arkansas (AP-2, NEA-1, FWAA)
- Dave Hoppmann, Iowa State (AP-3, FWAA)
- Roger Kochman, Penn State (AFCA-1, SN-2, UPI-2, CP-2)
- Joe Don Looney, Oklahoma (SN-2, CP-2)
- Kermit Alexander, UCLA (AFCA-2)
- Preacher Pilot, New Mexico State (NEA-2)
- Billy Gambrell, South Carolina (AFCA-3, CP-3)
- Jerry Yost, West Virginia (AP-3)
- Bobby Santiago, New Mexico (AP-3)
- Paul Flatley, Northwestern (SN-3)
- Johnny Roland, Missouri (SN-3, CP-3)
- Pete Pedro, West Texas State (NEA-3)
- Gary Wood, Cornell (NEA-3)
- Mike McNames, Georgia Tech (NEA-3)
- Kermit Alexander, UCLA (UPI-2)

=== Fullbacks ===
- George Saimes, Michigan State (AFCA-1, AP-1, FWAA, NEA-2, SN-1, UPI-1, CP-1, WC)
- Eldon Fortie, BYU (AFCA-3 [halfback], AP-2 [quarterback], NEA-1, UPI-2)
- Tom Myers, Syracuse (FWAA, UPI-3)
- Ray Poage, Texas (SN-2, Time, UPI-3)
- Bill Thornton, Nebraska (AFCA-2, SN-3)
- Ed Cummings, Stanford (AFCA-3)
- Junior Coffey, Washington (CP-2)
- Pat Culpepper, Texas (CP-3)

== Key ==
- **Bold** – Consensus All-American
- -1 – First-team selection
- -2 – Second-team selection
- -3 – Third-team selection

=== Official selectors ===
- AFCA = American Football Coaches Association sponsored by the Eastman Kodak Company, selected by AFCA members "on the basis of on-the-field observations, scouting report data and analysis of game movies"
- AP = Associated Press, "picked on recommendations of eight regional boards composed of sports writers and broadcasters"
- FWAA = Football Writers Association of America
- NEA = Newspaper Enterprise Association, "elected by the nation's coaches and football writers", NEA All-Americans also required to meet "scholastic requirements"
- SN = Sporting News
- UPI = United Press International - selected by nationwide ballots of 368 sports writers and broadcaters

=== Other selectors ===
- CP = Central Press Association - selected based on voting by the captains of football teams at the major schools
- Time = Time magazine - selected by "the men who should know best, the scouts of the professional football leagues"
- WC = Walter Camp Football Foundation

== See also ==
- 1962 All-Atlantic Coast Conference football team
- 1962 All-Big Eight Conference football team
- 1962 All-Big Ten Conference football team
- 1962 All-Pacific Coast football team
- 1962 All-SEC football team
- 1962 All-Southwest Conference football team
