= Thomas Sirk =

American football quarterback (born 1993)

Profile
- Position: Quarterback

Personal information
- Born: September 24, 1993 (age 33)
- Listed height: 6 ft 4 in (1.93 m)
- Listed weight: 220 lb (100 kg)

Career information
- High school: Baker Co. (Glen St. Mary, Florida)
- College: Duke (2012–2016); East Carolina (2017)
- NFL draft: 2018: undrafted

Career history
- New York Giants (2018)*
- * Offseason or practice squad member only

Thomas Sirk (born September 24, 1993) is an American former football quarterback. He played college football for the Duke Blue Devils and East Carolina Pirates.

== Early life ==
Sirk attended Baker County High School in Glen St. Mary, Florida. He finished his senior season accounting for over 2,000 yards passing and 1,000 yards rushing. Following his high school career, Sirk committed to play college football at Duke University.

== College career ==
Sirk redshirted in 2012 and missed the entirety of the 2013 season after rupturing his Achilles tendon in his right leg, requiring him to undergo surgery. During the 2014 season, he appeared in 12 games as the backup to Anthony Boone, throwing for 67 yards and three touchdowns while also rushing for 238 yards and a team-high eight touchdowns. In Sirk's first career start in the 2015 season opener against Tulane, he completed 27 passes for 289 yards and two touchdowns, leading the Blue Devils to a 37–7 victory. The following week against North Carolina Central, he accounted for 401 total yards and four touchdowns. In the 2015 Pinstripe Bowl, Sirk recorded over 300 total yards and three touchdowns, being named the game's co-MVP and leading Duke to their first bowl victory since 1961. He finished the 2015 season throwing for 2,625 yards and 16 touchdowns while also rushing for 803 yards and eight touchdowns. In February 2016, Sirk ruptured his left Achilles tendon. He returned to practice in August but re-injured the Achilles, causing him to be ruled out for the entire 2016 season. As a result of the injury, Sirk was granted an extra year of eligibility. Following the season, he announced his intention to transfer.

In April 2017, Sirk announced his decision to transfer to East Carolina University. Entering the 2017 season, Gardner Minshew was named the Pirates' starting quarterback over Sirk. After poor play from Minshew in the season opener against James Madison, he took over as the starter. In his first start with the Pirates against West Virginia, Sirk completed 16 passes for 191 yards, a touchdown and two interceptions, before leaving the game in the third quarter with an injury. In his next start against UConn, he threw for a career-high 426 yards and three touchdowns, being named the American Athletic Conference offensive player of the week. Sirk continued to split playing time with Minshew throughout the season, finishing the 2017 campaign throwing for 1,655 yards, nine touchdowns, and nine interceptions in seven starts.

=== Statistics ===
College statistics
Season	Team	Games			Passing								Rushing			
Season	Team	GP	GS	Record	Cmp	Att	Pct	Yds	Avg	TD	Int	Rtg	Att	Yds	Avg	TD
2012	Duke	Redshirted (redshirt)														
2013	Duke	DNP														
2014	Duke	12	0	–	10	14	71.4	67	4.8	3	0	182.3	47	238	5.1	8
2015	Duke	12	12	8–4	251	427	58.8	2,625	6.1	16	8	119.0	163	803	4.9	8
2016	Duke	DNP														
2017	East Carolina	11	7	2–5	132	236	55.9	1,655	7.0	9	9	119.8	64	165	2.6	3
Career		35	19	10−9	393	677	58.1	4,347	6.4	28	17	120.6	274	1,206	4.4	19

== Professional career ==
After going undrafted in the 2018 NFL draft, Sirk signed with the New York Giants as an undrafted free agent. He was waived by the Giants prior to the 2018 season.
