= Bill McKenny =

American gridiron football player (1940–2021)

William Dee McKenny (August 4, 1940 - January 31, 2021) was an American gridiron football player. He played college football at the University of Georgia from 1959 to 1961 and was a member of the 1959 Georgia Bulldogs football team that won the Orange Bowl.

== Early life ==
McKenny was born in Slayton, Minnesota, to Charles and Velma McKenny in 1940. The family moved to Jacksonville, Florida, in 1942.

McKenny achieved stardom at Landon High, Jacksonville, Florida, capping his career there by being the MVP for the North squad in the 1958 Florida High School All Star game. He earned All State, AllSouthern, and All America recognition in 1957.

== College football ==
McKenny played varsity football for the University of Georgia from 1959 to 1961 where he played as both an offensive and defensive back. His football honors at UGA included the remarkable feat of being named the Best Defensive Sideback in the SEC and the Best Blocking Back in the SEC in 1961. He was also honored as the Outstanding Bulldog Football Player of 1961. He led the 1961 Bulldogs in rushing, pass receiving and interceptions. McKenny was an alternate captain and competed in the 1961 Blue-Gray Bowl as a representative of the South. In 1961, McKenny was named All-Southeastern Conference (SEC) along with tackle Pete Case.

=== 1960 Orange Bowl ===
The 1959 Bulldogs were projected to place ninth out of 10 teams in the SEC but won the conference title, earning a trip to the Orange Bowl in Miami. Georgia defeated the Missouri Tigers, 14–0. Fran Tarkenton threw two touchdown passes, one to Aaron Box and one to McKenny.

"Coach Butts put in a special play for Missouri. It was a banana route. The two ends went downfield and broke to the sideline. I drifted through the line of scrimmage and ran a banana route through the space created by the defensive backs. I was wide open. Catching that touchdown pass from Fran Tarkenton remains a big thrill to this day."

== Professional football career ==
McKenny continued his football career with the Edmonton Eskimos in the Canadian Football League (CFL). He played for one year with the Eskimos before being drafted by the United States Army. He did not return to football career after being discharged from active duty.

== Later years ==
In 2013, McKenny was awarded the Postgraduate Achievement Award by the University of Georgia Chapter of the National Football Foundation. He now lives with his wife, Kay, in Lawrenceville, GA.
