= Louis Guy (American football) =

American football player (born 1941)

No. 23, 22
- Position: Defensive back

Personal information
- Born: May 26, 1941 (age 85); McComb, Mississippi, U.S.
- Listed height: 6 ft 0 in (1.83 m)
- Listed weight: 190 lb (86 kg)

Career information
- High school: McComb
- College: Ole Miss
- NFL draft: 1963: 3rd round, 40th overall pick
- AFL draft: 1963: 7th round, 51st overall pick

Career history
- New York Giants (1963); Oakland Raiders (1964)

Awards and highlights
- National champion (1960); Third-team All-SEC (1962)

Career NFL statistics
- Games played: 11
- Interceptions: 4
- Stats at Pro Football Reference

Louis Burton Guy Jr. (born May 26, 1941) is an American former professional football player who was a defensive back who played in the American Football League (AFL) and the National Football League (NFL). He played college football for the Ole Miss Rebels.

== College career ==
Guy played wingback and defensive back at the University of Mississippi for four seasons. He was a member of the 1960 Ole Miss team that was named national champions by the Football Writers Association of America. Guy co-captained the team in 1962 when the Rebels went 10-0. That season he set school records for most touchdown receptions in a game with three against Houston and for the longest interception return against Tennessee after picking off a pass in the end zone and returning it 100 yards for a touchdown. Guy finished the season as the team's leading receiver with 24 receptions for 295 yards and five touchdown catches and also led the team with eight total touchdowns and was named third-team All-Southeastern Conference.

== Professional career ==
Guy was selected by the Philadelphia Eagles in the third round of the 1963 NFL draft and by the New York Jets in the seventh round of the 1963 AFL draft. Guy's draft rights were traded to the New York Giants in exchange for Paul Dudley. He started his rookie season on injured reserve after separating his shoulder in a preseason game and later appeared in five games for the Giants. Guy was cut during training camp the following season. After his release, Guy was signed by the Oakland Raiders of the American Football League and played in six games during the 1964 season.

== Post-football ==
After retiring from football Guy enrolled at the University of Tennessee College of Dentistry and graduated with a D.D.S. and an M.S. in orthodontics.
