= The Joe Namath Show =

American talk show television series

- Starring: Joe Namath; Dick Schaap
- Country of origin: United States
- Original language: English
- No. of episodes: 13

Original release
- Release: October 6 – December 29, 1969

The Joe Namath Show is a 1969 talk show hosted by Joe Namath and Dick Schaap. It premiered on October 6, 1969, and lasted one season with 13 episodes.
