= 1963 All-SEC football team =

American college football all-star team

The 1963 All-SEC football team consists of American football players selected to the All-Southeastern Conference (SEC) chosen by various selectors for the 1963 NCAA University Division football season.

== All-SEC selections ==
=== Ends ===
- Billy Martin, Georgia Tech (AP-1, UPI-1)
- Allen Brown, Ole Miss (AP-1, UPI-2)
- Billy Truax, LSU (AP-2, UPI-1)
- Howard Simpson, Auburn (AP-2, UPI-2)
- Tommy Inman, Miss. St. (UPI-3)
- Ted Davis, Georgia Tech (UPI-3)

=== Tackles ===
- Whaley Hall, Ole Miss (AP-1, UPI-1)
- Tommy Neville, Miss. St. (AP-1, UPI-2)
- Herschel Turner, Kentucky (UPI-1)
- Ray Rissmiller, Georgia (AP-2, UPI-2)
- Dennis Murphy, Florida (AP-2, UPI-3)
- Mike Calamari, Tulane (UPI-3)

=== Guards ===
- Steve DeLong, Tennessee (AP-1, UPI-1)
- Robbie Huckelbridge, LSU (AP-1, UPI-2)
- Stan Hindman, Ole Miss (AP-2, UPI-1)
- Bill Van Dyke, Auburn (UPI-2)
- Jack Katz, Florida (UPI-3)
- Remi Prudhomme, LSU (UPI-3)

=== Centers ===
- Ken Dill, Ole Miss (AP-1, UPI-2)
- Pat Watson, Miss. St. (AP-2 [as G], UPI-1)
- Dave Simmons, Georgia Tech (AP-2)
- Ruffin Rodrigue, LSU (UPI-3)

=== Quarterbacks ===
- Billy Lothridge, Georgia Tech (AP-1, UPI-1)
- Larry Rakestraw, Georgia (AP-2, UPI-2)
- Perry Lee Dunn, Ole Miss (AP-2, UPI-2)
- Joe Namath, Alabama (UPI-2)

=== Halfbacks ===
- Jimmy Sidle, Auburn (AP-1, UPI-1)
- Benny Nelson, Alabama (AP-1, UPI-1)
- Ode Burrell, Miss. St. (AP-2, UPI-2)
- Tucker Frederickson, Auburn (College Football Hall of Fame) (AP-2, UPI-3)
- Danny Leblanc, LSU (UPI-3)
- Sonny Fisher, Miss. St. (UPI-3)

=== Fullbacks ===
- Larry Dupree, Florida (AP-1, UPI-1)
- Hoyle Granger, Miss. St. (UPI-3)

== Key ==
AP = Associated Press

UPI = United Press International

Bold = Consensus first-team selection by both AP and UPI

== See also ==
- 1963 College Football All-America Team
