= Union Pacific Harriman Dispatch Center =

Rail traffic control headquarters for the Union Pacific railroad

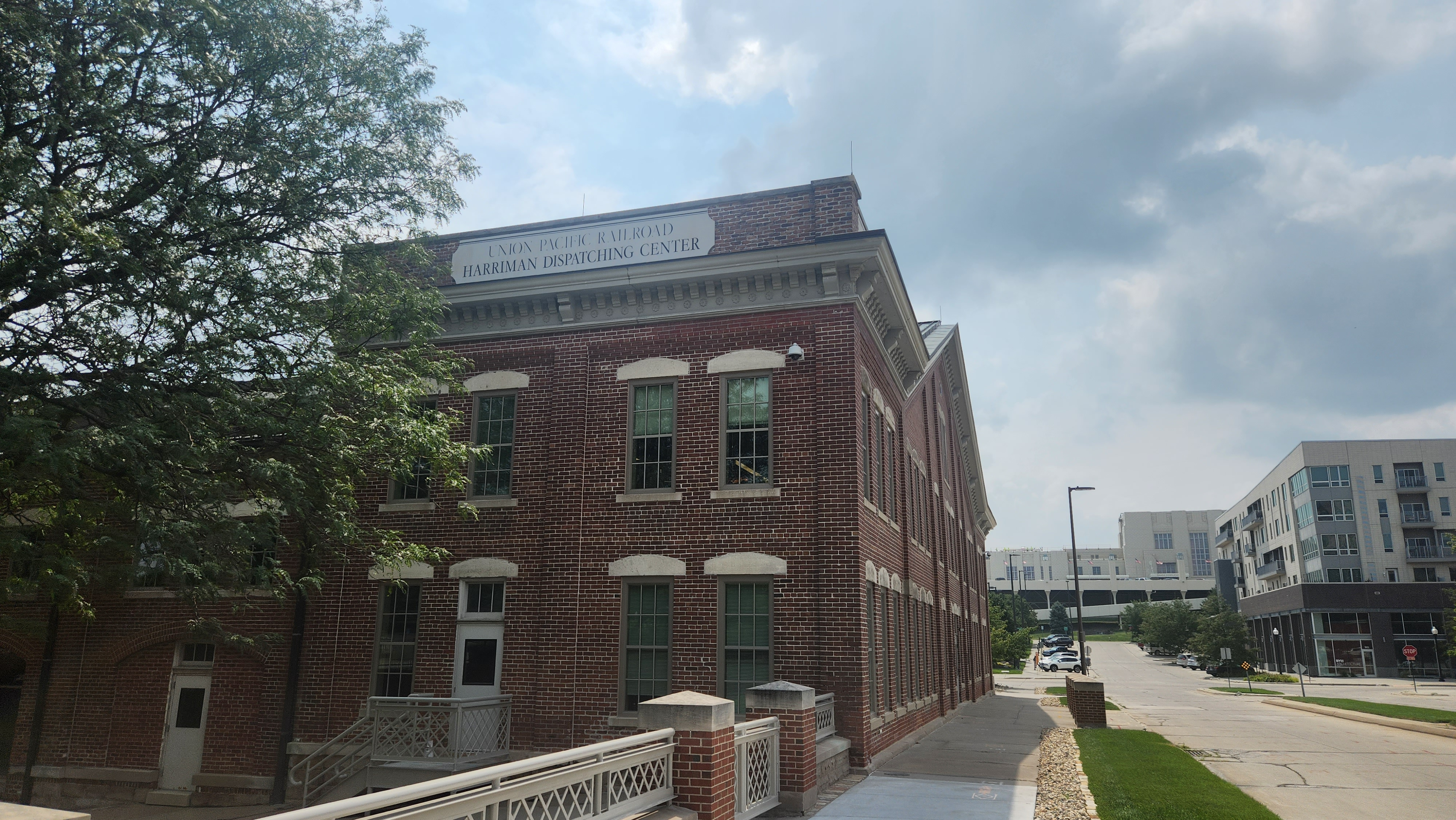
- Harriman Dispatch Center in 2025
- Interactive map of the Union Pacific Harriman Dispatch Center area
- Alternative names: The Bunker

General information
- Location: Downtown Omaha, Nebraska, 850 Jones St.
- Coordinates: 41°15′14″N 95°55′38″W
- Year built: 1891
- Renovated: 1988–1989
- Owner: Union Pacific

The Union Pacific Harriman Dispatch Center (HDC) is Union Pacific's rail traffic control headquarters. Also known as "The Bunker", it monitors trains, track and switches across the United States. The dispatch center is located at 850 Jones Street in Downtown Omaha, Nebraska, and is built inside an old Union Pacific freight depot that was built in 1891 and sold in 1897. The building was redeveloped in the late 1980s with a bunker made of 18-24 inch steel reinforced concrete that is designed to withstand a direct tornado strike. The headquarters for Union Pacific, called Union Pacific Center, is located nearby in Downtown Omaha.

== History ==
Union Pacific Harriman Dispatch Center began as a Union Pacific Freight Depot in 1891. In 1987, plans were announced to renovate the current facility and build another one adjacent to it. Renovations began in 1988, alongside plans to build Conagra's corporate campus. Renovations would shorten the building's length from 374 feet (114 m) to about 314 feet (96 m). Renovation was completed in 1989 and the dispatch center began operation that same year.

In 1997 the Federal Railroad Administration (FRA) became concerned with the safety of the Union Pacific Railroad. A report found that at the HDC some supervisors were unfamiliar with the areas they were responsible for due to poor training. New dispatchers would become overwhelmed with busy shifts they had not trained on prior to qualification. The Harriman Dispatch Center problems section of the report concluded the dispatching problems represented "a serious safety concern" and recommended Union Pacific reduce workloads, provide better training, hire more dispatchers and improve dispatching software. Union Pacific responded by reducing workloads at 11 dispatcher positions, creating new training courses for staff, hiring more dispatchers and contracting Union Switch and Signal to improve computer systems.

After a review in 2006, the HDC underwent a refurbishment. The center was reorganised into teams who would be responsible for different areas of Union Pacifics network. 10 SXGA+ Mitsubishi video walls were installed by Activu Services on the operations floor for each "pod" or team. Activu also upgraded systems in the conference room and visitor gallery.

In 2016 members of the 557th Weather Wing of the U.S Air Force visited the Dispatch Center including its commander, Colonel Steven Dickerson.

In 2020, 60 train dispatchers at the Harriman Dispatch Center were made redundant. Union Pacific said this was due to COVID-19 and the installation of new computer-aided dispatching software.
