= Rufus Guthrie =

American football player (1942–2000)

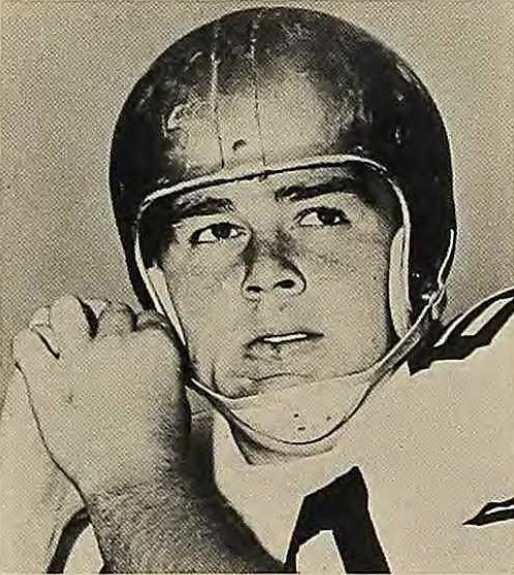
- Guthrie from The 1963 Blue Print

Profile
- Position: Guard

Personal information
- Born: 1942; Smyrna, Georgia, U.S.
- Died: 2000 (aged 57–58)
- Listed height: 6 ft 1 in (1.85 m)
- Listed weight: 240 lb (109 kg)

Career information
- College: Georgia Tech
- NFL draft: 1963: 1st round, 10th overall pick

Career history
- 1963: San Diego Chargers

Awards and highlights
- First-team All-American (1962); First-team All-SEC (1962); Second-team All-SEC (1961)

Dallas Rufus Guthrie (c. 1942 – 2000) was an American football player who played for the Georgia Institute of Technology. He played collegiately for the Georgia Tech football team. He was inducted into the Georgia Tech Hall of Fame in 1971. Although drafted and signed as a professional he never played due to injury. He was selected as the 10th pick in the 1963 NFL draft by the Los Angeles Rams. He was also selected as the 10th pick in the first round American Football League (AFL) draft of that year by the San Diego Chargers. The Chargers won the competition for Guthrie and signed him to a professional contract. He attended the Chargers training camp and was on the field for the team's first exhibition game. On the opening play of the game, a kick-off, Guthrie was injured. He never played in a regular season game for the Chargers. After football, he established a successful career in real estate and died in 2000 from brain cancer.
