= 1962 All-Atlantic Coast Conference football team =

American college football all-star team

The 1962 All-Atlantic Coast Conference football team consists of American football players chosen by various selectors for their All-Atlantic Coast Conference ("ACC") teams for the 1962 NCAA University Division football season. Selectors in 1962 included the Associated Press (AP) and the United Press International (UPI). Players who were the consensus first-team selections of both the AP and UPI are displayed in bold.

== All-Atlantic Coast selections ==
=== Ends ===
- **Bob Lacey**, North Carolina (AP-1, UPI-1)
- Pete Widener, Duke (AP-2, UPI-1)
- Don Montgomery, North Carolina State (AP-1)
- John Caskey, South Carolina (AP-2)

=== Tackles ===
- **Art Gregory**, Duke (AP-1, UPI-1)
- **Don Chuy**, North Carolina (AP-1, UPI-1)
- Jim Moss, South Carolina (AP-2)
- Dave Graham, Virginia (AP-2)

=== Guards ===
- **Jean Berry**, Duke (AP-1, UPI-1)
- **Walter Rock**, Maryland (AP-1, UPI-1)
- Bill Sullivan, North Carolina State (AP-2)
- Bob Rowley, Virginia (AP-2)

=== Centers ===
- **Joe Craver**, North Carolina (AP-1, UPI-1)
- Paul Bengel, Duke (AP-2)

=== Backs ===
- **Dick Shiner**, Maryland (AP-1 [quarterback], UPI-1 [quarterback])
- **Billy Gambrell**, South Carolina (AP-1 [halfback], UPI-1 [halfback])
- **Mike Curtis**, Duke (AP-1 [fullback], UPI-1)
- Mark Leggett, Duke (AP-2, UPI-1)
- Tom Brown, Maryland (AP-1 [halfback])
- Dan Reeves, South Carolina (AP-2)
- Ken Willard, North Carolina (AP-2)
- Joe Scarpati, North Carolina State (AP-2)

== Key ==
AP = Associated Press, announced by the Atlantic Coast Sports Writers Association

UPI = United Press International

== See also ==
- 1962 College Football All-America Team
