= 1962 All-SEC football team =

College football honor

The 1962 All-SEC football team consists of American football players selected to the All-Southeastern Conference (SEC) chosen by various selectors for the 1962 NCAA University Division football season.

== All-SEC selections ==
=== Ends ===
- Tom Hutchinson, Kentucky (AP-1, UPI-1)
- Johnny Baker, Miss. St. (AP-1, UPI-2)
- Billy Martin, Georgia Tech (UPI-1)
- Mickey Babb, Georgia (UPI-2)
- Richard Williamson, Alabama (UPI-3)
- Ted Davis, Georgia Tech (UPI-3)

=== Tackles ===
- Fred Miller, LSU (AP-1, UPI-1)
- Junior Hawthorne, Kentucky (AP-1, UPI-2)
- Jim Dunaway, Ole Miss (UPI-1)
- Anton Peters, Florida (UPI-2)
- Don Estes, LSU (UPI-3)
- Joe Baughan, Auburn (UPI-3)

=== Guards ===
- Rufus Guthrie, Georgia Tech (AP-1, UPI-1)
- Don Dickson, Ole Miss (AP-1, UPI-2)
- Dave Watson, Georgia Tech (UPI-1)
- Bill Van Dyke, Auburn (UPI-2)
- Larry Travis, Florida (UPI-3)
- Pat Watson, Miss. St. (UPI-3)

=== Centers ===
- Lee Roy Jordan, Alabama (AP-1, UPI-1)
- Dennis Gaubatz, LSU (UPI-2)
- Jim Price, Auburn (UPI-3)

=== Quarterbacks ===
- Billy Lothridge, Georgia Tech (AP-1, UPI-1)
- Joe Namath, Alabama (UPI-2)

=== Halfbacks ===
- Jerry Stovall, LSU (College Football Hall of Fame) (AP-1, UPI-1)
- Glynn Griffing, Ole Miss (AP-1, UPI-1)
- Larry Dupree, Florida (AP-1, UPI-1)
- Cotton Clark, Alabama (UPI-2)
- Larry Rakestraw, Florida (UPI-2)
- Mallon Faircloth, Tennessee (UPI-2)
- Mike McNames, Georgia Tech (UPI-3)
- Darrell Cox, Kentucky (UPI-3)
- Louis Guy, Ole Miss (UPI-3)
- Jimmy Burson, Auburn (UPI-3)

== Key ==
AP = Associated Press

UPI = United Press International

Bold = Consensus first-team selection by both AP and UPI

== See also ==
- 1962 College Football All-America Team
