= Billy Gambrell =

American football player (born 1941)

No. 3
- Position: Wide receiver

Personal information
- Born: September 8, 1941 (age 85); Athens, Georgia, U.S.
- Listed height: 5 ft 10 in (1.78 m)
- Listed weight: 175 lb (79 kg)

Career information
- High school: Athens
- College: South Carolina
- AFL draft: 1963: 12th round, 92nd overall pick

Career history
- St. Louis Cardinals (1963–1967); Detroit Lions (1968)

Awards and highlights
- Third-team All-American (1962); ACC Player of the Year (1962); First-team All-ACC (1962)

Career statistics
- Receptions: 116
- Receiving yards: 1,931
- Touchdowns: 18
- Stats at Pro Football Reference

William Edward Gambrell (born September 18, 1941) is an American former professional football player who was a wide receiver in the National Football League (NFL). He played college football for the South Carolina Gamecocks and was selected by the Boston Patriots in the 12th round (92nd overall) of the 1963 American Football League draft, Gambrell played for the NFL's St. Louis Cardinals (1963–1967) and Detroit Lions (1968).

Gambrell won the Most Valuable Player award in the Playoff Bowl on January 3, 1965, after he caught 6 passes for 184 yards and two touchdowns in the Cardinals 24–17 win over the Green Bay Packers.
