= Jim Dunaway =

American football player (1941–2018)

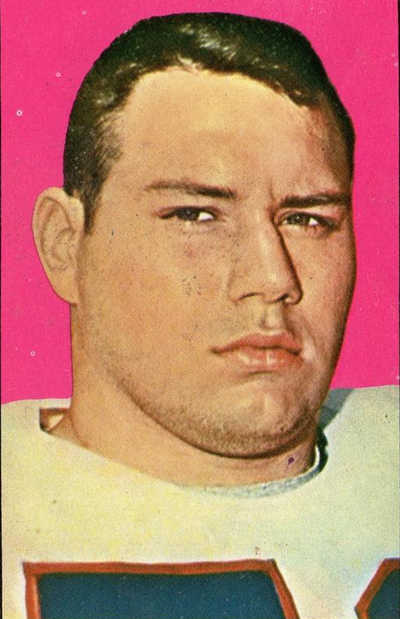

No. 78, 71
- Position: Defensive tackle

Personal information
- Born: September 3, 1941; Columbia, Mississippi, U.S.
- Died: May 12, 2018 (aged 76); Columbia, Mississippi, U.S.
- Listed height: 6 ft 4 in (1.93 m)
- Listed weight: 277 lb (126 kg)

Career information
- High school: Columbia (MS)
- College: Ole Miss
- NFL draft: 1963: 1st round, 3rd overall pick
- AFL draft: 1963: 2nd round, 9th overall pick

Career history
- Buffalo Bills (1963–1971); Miami Dolphins (1972); Houston Oilers (1973)*; Jacksonville Sharks (1974); Jacksonville Express (1975)
- * Offseason or practice squad member only

Awards and highlights
- Super Bowl champion (VII); 2× AFL champion (1964, 1965); First-team All-AFL (1966); 4× AFL All-Star (1965–1968); National champion (1960); Consensus All-American (1962); Second-team All-American (1961); 2× First-team All-SEC (1961, 1962)

Career NFL/AFL statistics
- Fumble recoveries: 7
- Interceptions: 1
- Sacks: 23.5
- Stats at Pro Football Reference

James Kenneth Dunaway (September 3, 1941 – May 12, 2018) was an American professional football player. A defensive tackle, he played college football at the University of Mississippi, and played in the American Football League (AFL) for the Buffalo Bills, as part of a defensive line that held opposing runners without a rushing touchdown for a pro football record seventeen consecutive games in the 1964 and 1965 AFL seasons.

== Murder charge and aftermath ==
On July 27, 1998, Dunaway's ex-wife, Nonniel Dunaway, was found dead in a half-empty swimming pool. An autopsy revealed that she had a fractured skull and was unconscious when she was placed in the water by her assailant where she drowned. Prior to this event, she had won a divorce judgment which gave her more than 800 acres (3.2 km^{2}) of property that the couple owned, $1,800 a month in alimony and half of Dunaway's NFL pension. They had been divorced since 1995 and Dunaway was planning to appeal.

Dunaway was charged with her murder but a grand jury chose not to indict Dunaway of the charges. In response, his children filed a wrongful death lawsuit, alleging that Dunaway was responsible for their mother's death. In 2002, Dunaway was found liable and ordered to pay $579,000 to his children.

Coincidentally, Dunaway had been a teammate for three seasons of star running back O. J. Simpson, who was similarly found responsible for his ex-wife's death after being acquitted of her murder in a controversial trial in 1995.

== See also ==
- Other American Football League players
