= Howard Simpson (American football) =

American football player (1942–2023)

No. 78, 71
- Position: Defensive end

Personal information
- Born: December 14, 1942; Lancaster, South Carolina, U.S.
- Died: December 28, 2023 (aged 81); Marietta, Georgia, U.S.
- Listed height: 6 ft 5 in (1.96 m)
- Listed weight: 230 lb (104 kg)

Career information
- High school: Marietta
- College: Auburn (1960–1963)
- AFL draft: 1964: 10th round, 76th overall pick

Career history
- Minnesota Vikings (1964–1965); Buffalo Bills (1965)*; Miami Dolphins (1966)*
- * Offseason or practice squad member only

Awards and highlights
- AFL champion (1965); Second-team All-SEC (1963)

Career statistics
- Games played: 3
- Stats at Pro Football Reference

Howard Jesse Simpson (December 14, 1942 – December 28, 2023) was an American professional football defensive end who played in the National Football League (NFL) with the Minnesota Vikings. He played college football for the Auburn Tigers. Simpson also had stints in the American Football League (AFL) with the Buffalo Bills and Miami Dolphins.

== Early life ==
Simpson was born on December 14, 1942, in Lancaster, South Carolina. He attended Marietta High School in Marietta, Georgia. Simpson committed to play college football at Auburn University.

== College career ==
Simpson played college football for the Auburn Tigers from 1960 to 1963. He was three-year letterman from 1961 to 1963. In 30 games, Simpson had 37 receptions for 496 yards and two touchdowns. In 1963, he was named to the second-team All-SEC and was voted as the SEC lineman-of-the-year award.

== Professional career ==
=== Minnesota Vikings ===
Simpson was selected in the tenth round, with the 76th overall selection, by the Buffalo Bills in the 1964 American Football League draft, however he would sign with the Minnesota Vikings of the National Football League (NFL). He played in three games for the Vikings at defensive end. On September 7 , 1965, he was waived by the team.

=== Buffalo Bills ===
After Simpson was released from the Vikings, he signed to the practice squad of the Buffalo Bills of the American Football League (AFL). He remained on the taxi squad as the Bills defeated the San Diego Chargers in the 1965 AFL Championship Game.

=== Miami Dolphins ===
On January 15, 1966, the Simpson was selected by the Miami Dolphins in the 1966 American Football League expansion draft. On July 18, he retired from professional football.
