= Larry Rakestraw =

American football player (1942–2019)

No. 12
- Position: Quarterback

Personal information
- Born: April 22, 1942; Mableton, Georgia, U.S.
- Died: August 4, 2019 (aged 77); Suwanee, Georgia, U.S.
- Listed height: 6 ft 2 in (1.88 m)
- Listed weight: 195 lb (88 kg)

Career information
- College: Georgia
- NFL draft: 1964: 8th round, 112th overall pick
- AFL draft: 1964: 11th round, 87th overall pick

Career history
- Chicago Bears (1966–1968)

Awards and highlights
- 2× Second-team All-SEC (1962, 1963); Georgia Sports Hall of Fame (2010)

Career NFL statistics
- Passing attempts: 111
- Passing completions: 51
- Completion percentage: 45.9%
- TD–INT: 4–9
- Passing yards: 589
- Passer rating: 40.7
- Stats at Pro Football Reference

Larry Clyde Rakestraw (April 22, 1942 – August 4, 2019) was an American football quarterback in the National Football League (NFL). He played three seasons for the Chicago Bears. Rakestraw attended the University of Georgia where he was a three-year starter at quarterback. He was a member of the Sigma Chi fraternity. Larry lived in Suwanee, Georgia and had 11 grandchildren. He was inducted into the Georgia Sports Hall of Fame.

College records at UGA

- Two time All-Southeastern Conference.
- Passed for more than 3,000 yards.
- Starting quarterback as a So, Jr and Sr.
- Led the SEC in pass completions and passing yardage in his senior year.
- Senior Bowl most valuable player.

1963 Georgia vs. Miami

Rakestraw had 407 yards passing against Miami and broke one NCAA record - and 3 SEC records (414 total offense, 25 pass completions, 407 yards passing yards).

Rakestraw died on August 4, 2019, at the age of 77.
