= Billy Martin (tight end) =

American football player (1942–2018)

Bill Martin
No. 85, 89
- Position: Tight end

Personal information
- Born: October 27, 1942; Gainesville, Georgia, U.S.
- Died: March 14, 2018 (aged 75); Cumming, Georgia, U.S.
- Listed height: 6 ft 4 in (1.93 m)
- Listed weight: 238 lb (108 kg)

Career information
- High school: Gainesville
- College: Georgia Tech
- NFL draft: 1964: 2nd round, 21st overall pick
- AFL draft: 1964: 2nd round, 10th overall pick

Career history
- Chicago Bears (1964–1965); Atlanta Falcons (1966–1967); Minnesota Vikings (1968)

Awards and highlights
- First-team All-American (1963); 2× First-team All-SEC (1962, 1963)

Career NFL statistics
- Receptions: 58
- Receiving yards: 705
- Touchdowns: 4
- Stats at Pro Football Reference

Jake William Martin (October 27, 1942 – March 14, 2018) was an American football tight end in the National Football League (NFL) for the Chicago Bears, the Atlanta Falcons, and the Minnesota Vikings. He played college football at Georgia Tech and was drafted in the second round (21st overall selection) of the 1964 NFL draft. Martin was subsequently selected by the Atlanta Falcons in the 1966 NFL expansion draft.

Martin played high school football at Gainesville High School in Gainesville, Georgia. He was a teammate of Billy Lothridge both at Gainesville High and Georgia Tech.

Martin died in Cumming, Georgia, on March 14, 2018, he was 75.
