= Fred Miller (defensive lineman) =

American football player (1940–2023)

No. 76
- Position: Defensive tackle

Personal information
- Born: August 8, 1940; Homer, Louisiana, U.S.
- Died: February 25, 2023 (aged 82); Timonium, Maryland, U.S.
- Listed height: 6 ft 3 in (1.91 m)
- Listed weight: 250 lb (113 kg)

Career information
- High school: Homer
- College: LSU (1958-1962)
- NFL draft: 1962: 7th round, 93rd overall pick
- AFL draft: 1962: 26th round, 201st overall pick

Career history
- Baltimore Colts (1963–1972); Washington Redskins (1973)*
- * Offseason or practice squad member only

Awards and highlights
- Super Bowl champion (V); NFL champion (1968); 2× Second-team All-Pro (1967, 1968); 3× Pro Bowl (1967-1969); First-team All-American (1962); First-team All-SEC (1962)

Career NFL statistics
- Fumble recoveries: 10
- Sacks: 52
- Stats at Pro Football Reference

Fred David Miller (August 8, 1940 – February 25, 2023) was an American professional football player who was a defensive tackle for the Baltimore Colts of the National Football League (NFL) from 1963 through 1972. He played college football for the LSU Tigers. Miller appeared in three championship games for the Colts: the 1964 NFL championship game against the Browns, Super Bowl III against the Jets, and Super Bowl V against the Cowboys.

== Biography ==
Miller was born in Homer, Louisiana, on August 8, 1940. His father was a sharecropper.

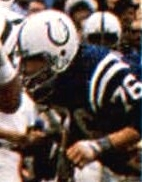
Fred Miller playing in Super Bowl III.

Miller graduated from Homer High School in his hometown in 1958. A four-year football letterman, he mostly played center and tackle and was a starter in his last three years at the school.

With both the NFL and American Football League (AFL) competing against each other to acquire the best available talent, Miller was picked in both drafts in 1962. He was selected by the NFL's Baltimore Colts in the 7th round (93rd overall) and the AFL's Oakland Raiders in the 26th round (201st overall). He eventually signed with the Colts.

Miller died in Timonium, Maryland, on February 25, 2023, at the age of 82.
