= Lee Roy Jordan =

American football player (1941–2025)

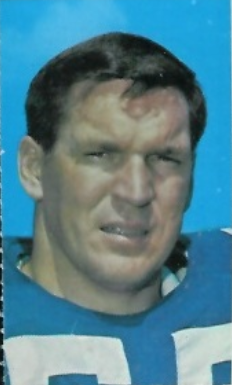
- Jordan in 1969

No. 55
- Position: Linebacker

Personal information
- Born: April 27, 1941; Excel, Alabama, U.S.
- Died: August 30, 2025 (aged 84); Dallas, Texas, U.S.
- Listed height: 6 ft 1 in (1.85 m)
- Listed weight: 221 lb (100 kg)

Career information
- High school: Excel
- College: Alabama (1960–1962)
- NFL draft: 1963: 1st round, 6th overall pick
- AFL draft: 1963: 2nd round, 14th overall pick

Career history
- Dallas Cowboys (1963–1976)

Awards and highlights
- Super Bowl champion (VI); 2× Second-team All-Pro (1969, 1973); 5× Pro Bowl (1967–1969, 1973, 1974); Dallas Cowboys Ring of Honor; NCAA national champion (1961); Unanimous All-American (1962); First-team All-SEC (1962); Second-team All-SEC (1961)

Career NFL statistics
- Interceptions: 32
- Touchdowns: 3
- Games played: 186
- Stats at Pro Football Reference
- College Football Hall of Fame

Lee Roy Jordan (April 27, 1941 – August 30, 2025) was an American professional football player who was a linebacker for 14 seasons with the Dallas Cowboys of the National Football League (NFL) from 1963 to 1976. He played college football for the Alabama Crimson Tide and was selected by the Cowboys in the first round of the 1963 NFL draft. He was inducted into the College Football Hall of Fame in 1983.

== Early life ==
Born and raised in Excel, Alabama, Jordan was the fifth of seven children of Walter Sr. and Cleo Jordan. He had three older brothers: Walter Jr., Carl, and Bennie Ray and three sisters: Lottie, Agnes, and Darlene (who died at age two, of leukemia). He was a standout at fullback at Excel High School and graduated in 1959.

== College career ==
Jordan excelled as both a linebacker and center at the University of Alabama. In his sophomore season of 1960, he helped the Crimson Tide finish with an 8–1–2 record. In the Bluebonnet Bowl versus the Texas Longhorns, he was named the game's most valuable player (MVP) in a 3–3 tie.

The following year, Jordan was again an important part of the team as Alabama finished with an 11–0 record, a Southeastern Conference (SEC) championship, and the national championship. The season included six shutouts, which included a 34–0 win over rival Auburn. Led by senior quarterback Pat Trammell (1940–1968), Alabama wrapped up the season with a 10–3 victory over Arkansas in the Sugar Bowl.

In his senior season in 1962, the Crimson Tide fell short of another national championship with a 10–1 record with sophomore quarterback Joe Namath. The loss was by one point at Georgia Tech in mid-November, their first defeat in over two years. In his final game for the Tide, Jordan recorded 31 tackles in a 17–0 victory over Oklahoma in the Orange Bowl, attended by President John F. Kennedy. For his performance, he received his second MVP award in a bowl game. At the end of his senior year, he received unanimous All-American status and the Lineman of the Year award.

During his career for Alabama, Jordan received high praise from coach Bear Bryant, who stated, "He was one of the finest football players the world has ever seen. If runners stayed between the sidelines, he tackled them. He never had a bad day, he was 100 percent every day in practice and in the games."

In early August 1963 in Chicago, he was part of the College All-Star team that defeated the defending champion Green Bay Packers.

In 1980, he was inducted into the Alabama Sports Hall of Fame. In 1983, he was inducted into the College Football Hall of Fame. In 1988, he received the NCAA Silver Anniversary Award.

== Professional career ==
Jordan was selected sixth overall in the 1963 NFL draft by the Dallas Cowboys, and was the 14th overall pick in the AFL draft, taken by the Boston Patriots. He chose the NFL and signed in early January. During preseason in 1963 he was named the Cowboys' weakside linebacker and became the first rookie linebacker in franchise history to start a season opener.

He shared time with Jerry Tubbs at middle linebacker in 1965, then took over and teamed up with Chuck Howley and Dave Edwards as part of the Doomsday Defense. His teammates nicknamed him "Killer".

In 1971, he had a team-record 21 tackles against the Philadelphia Eagles on September 26. On November 4, 1973, he intercepted three passes in the first quarter from the Cincinnati Bengals' Ken Anderson within the span of five minutes, returning one 31 yards for a touchdown. The interceptions were collectively named one of the 10 most memorable moments in the history of Texas Stadium by ESPN in 2008.

=== Legacy ===
Jordan was usually the smallest middle linebacker in the league at only 6 ft 1 in (1.85 m) and 220 pounds (100 kg), but his competitiveness and drive made up for his lack of size. Head coach Tom Landry said of Jordan, "He was a great competitor. He was not big for a middle linebacker, but because of his competitiveness, he was able to play the game and play it well. His leadership was there and he demanded a lot out of the people around him as he did of himself." He ran Landry's "Flex" defense on the field with unmatched intensity and efficiency. He watched game film endlessly; his contract included a projector for his home.

He became the franchise's all-time leader in solo tackles (743) in his 14 seasons with the Cowboys. He was a two-time All-Pro and a five-time Pro Bowler. He also helped the Cowboys to three Super Bowls and five NFC Championship games. Jordan was an able defender against the run and pass, and had a penchant for recovering loose footballs. He remains tied for second in club history with 18 career fumble recoveries.

Jordan still ranks second in Cowboys' history in career solo tackles with 743, second in career assisted tackles with 493, second in combined total tackles with 1,236, and second with 154 consecutive starts (behind Jason Witten). He also holds the third- and fourth-highest totals of solo tackles in a single season with 100 in 1975 and 97 in 1968. In his 14 NFL seasons, he intercepted 32 passes (seventh in club history), returning them for 472 yards and three touchdowns.

In 1988, he was among 15 finalists for induction into the Pro Football Hall of Fame, but did not make the cut (among those finalists, Lou Rymkus and he are the only ones who did not eventually become elected into the Hall). In 1989, he became the seventh member of the Dallas Cowboys Ring of Honor. He was the first member inducted by Jerry Jones.

In 2018, the Professional Football Researchers Association named Jordan to the PFRA Hall of Very Good Class of 2018.

== Personal life and death ==
Jordan married his college sweetheart, Mary "Biddie" Banks of Eutaw, and they had three sons. After his football career, he managed the Lee Roy Jordan Lumber Company, headquartered in Dallas. Jordan died at a hospice in Dallas, Texas due to kidney failure on August 30, 2025, at the age of 84.

== See also ==
- Most consecutive starts by a middle linebacker
