= Bob Rowley =

American football player (born 1941)

- Rowley at Virginia, 1961

No. 56, 63
- Positions: Linebacker, guard, place-kicker

Personal information
- Born: September 16, 1941; Somerset, Pennsylvania, U.S.
- Died: May 26, 2013 (aged 71); Cumberland, Maryland, U.S.
- Listed height: 6 ft 2 in (1.88 m)
- Listed weight: 230 lb (104 kg)

Career information
- High school: Fort Hill (MD)
- College: Virginia

Career history
- Pittsburgh Steelers (1963); New York Jets (1964)

Awards and highlights
- Second-team All-ACC (1962)
- Stats at Pro Football Reference

Elwood Robert Rowley (September 16, 1941 – May 26, 2013) was an American football linebacker. After playing college football for Virginia, he was a member of Pittsburgh Steelers in 1963 and the New York Jets in 1964.

== Early life ==
Rowley was born in Somerset, Pennsylvania, and attended Fort Hill High School. He then attended the University of Virginia where he played as a linebacker, guard, and place-kicker for the Cavaliers football team from 1960 to 1962. For his October 7, 1961, performance against NC State, including two field goals, he was named the collegiate lineman of the week. He was also selected as a second-team player on the 1961 All-Atlantic Coast Conference football team, and a first-team player on the Virginia All-Big Five football team.

== Professional career ==
Rowley was not selected in the 1963 NFL and AFL drafts. He attended the Pittsburgh Steelers' preseason training camp at West Liberty College as a free agent, survived multiple cuts, and was described as "one of the hardest working and most determined players" in the Steelers' camp, but "too small as NFL linebackers go." He was cut by the Steelers in the final roster cuts in early September, but he was retained on the team's taxi squad. Determined to play rather than be part of a taxi squad, Rowley sought and received permission from the Steelers to play with the Wheeling Ironmen of the United Football League; he appeared in several games at middle linebacker with the undefeated Ironmen during the 1963 season. In one game against the Cleveland Bulldogs, Rowley broke through twice to sack the Cleveland quarterback, causing fumbles on both occasions. In early November 1963, he was elevated to the Pittsburgh Steelers parent roster. He appeared in three games, one as a starter, for the Steelers in 1963. He also played in the AFL for the New York Jets in 1964. He appeared in a total of nine NFL and AFL games.
