= Excel High School (Alabama) =

School

Coordinates: 31.4322°N 87.3419°W

Excel High School is a public high school in Excel, Alabama. The school mascot is the panther, and the school colors are black and gold. It serves approximately 310 students each year.

The school is located in a rural, low populated area, with the largest graduating class being 79 students. In 1999, the school was designated a targeted assistance school and provided additional funding resources for additional instructional staff. In 2020, the student body was approximately 70% white and 25% African American.

== History ==
J. J. Benford was the principal in 1924.

== Alumni ==
Lee Roy Jordan graduated from Excel. He previously played football at the University of Alabama as part of Bear Bryant's second recruiting class, and in the NFL for the Dallas Cowboys. Coach Tom Landry is also an alumnus; he was inducted into the College Football Hall of Fame after his NFL career ended in 1976. W. C. Majors was his coach at Excel.
