= Tom Hutchinson (American football) =

American football player (1941–2007)

No. 87, 83
- Positions: Tight end, Wide receiver

Personal information
- Born: June 15, 1941; Stanford, Kentucky, U.S.
- Died: May 5, 2007 (aged 65); Campbellsville, Kentucky, U.S.
- Listed height: 6 ft 1 in (1.85 m)
- Listed weight: 190 lb (86 kg)

Career information
- High school: New Albany (New Albany, Indiana)
- College: Kentucky (1959–1962)
- NFL draft: 1963: 1st round, 9th overall pick
- AFL draft: 1963: 2nd round, 12th overall pick

Career history
- Cleveland Browns (1963–1965); Atlanta Falcons (1966)

Awards and highlights
- NFL champion (1964); Second-team All-American (1962); 3× First-team All-SEC (1960, 1961, 1962)

Career NFL statistics
- Receptions: 19
- Receiving yards: 409
- Touchdowns: 2
- Stats at Pro Football Reference

Thomas Edward Hutchinson (June 15, 1941 – May 5, 2007) was an American football wide receiver. He was son of Clifford Edward Hutchinson, and Sarah Elizabeth Semonas Hutchinson. He was an All-American receiver at the University of Kentucky and a member of their 1962 football team, known forever as the Thin Thirty.

He was drafted by the Cleveland Browns in the first round in the 1963 NFL draft. He played for the Browns until the 1965 season. He played with the Atlanta Falcons in his final season in 1966.

Hutchinson died of cancer in May 2007.
