= Kountze Memorial Lutheran Church =

Lutheran church in Omaha, Nebraska, U.S.

- The church in 2021

Religion
- Affiliation: Evangelical Lutheran Church in America

Location
- Location: 2650 Farnam Street; Omaha, Nebraska
- Interactive map of Kountze Memorial Lutheran Church
- Coordinates: 41°15′29″N 95°57′04″W

Architecture
- Groundbreaking: 1904
- Completed: 1906

Website
- www.kmlchurch.org

Kountze Memorial Lutheran Church is located at 2650 Farnam Street in Midtown Omaha, Nebraska. Organized on December 5, 1858, as Emanuel's Evangelical Lutheran Church, the church is thought to be the first Lutheran congregation organized west of the Missouri River. In the 1920s the church was credited with being the largest Lutheran congregation in the United States.

== History ==
In 1856, Augustus Kountze, then a young banker new to Omaha from Ohio, requested a pastor from the church of his youth. Reverend Henry Kuhns conducted the first Lutheran services in Omaha on November 21, 1858, with 14 founding members. In 1862 the church constructed its first building at 13th and Douglas Streets in Downtown Omaha. The second building was constructed in 1885 at 16th and Harney Streets and was named in memory of Kountze's father, Christian Kountze, after Augustus contributed one half of the construction costs.

The current building was opened in 1906, and the church continued to grow, adding neighborhood Sunday Schools across Omaha. Many of these Sunday Schools later developed into separate congregations, including the Lutheran Church of Our Redeemer on North 24th Street, Gethsemane Lutheran Church at 19th and Castelar, Pilgrim Lutheran Church at 42nd and Bancroft Streets, and St. Matthew Lutheran Church at 60th and Walnut. In 1916 the church claimed to be the largest Lutheran congregation in the world, with over 2,000 members. During the First World War the pastor of Kountze was embroiled in controversy as he was an outspoken opponent of the war. While many German members supported him, many in the congregation did not; however, he was not asked to leave his position.

The conventional of the Evangelical Lutheran General Synod of the United States of America was held at the church in 1887. In 1940, Kountze hosted the annual convention of the United Lutheran Church in America.

Extensive remodeling and repair work coincided with the 100th anniversary of the building in 2006. Kountze celebrated its 150th anniversary as a congregation in 2008.

== See also ==
- History of Omaha
