= Billy Lothridge =

American football player (1942–1996)

- Lothridge in 1972

No. 18, 10, 26, 7
- Positions: Punter, safety

Personal information
- Born: January 1, 1942; Cleveland, Georgia, U.S.
- Died: February 23, 1996 (aged 54); Pensacola, Florida, U.S.
- Listed height: 6 ft 1 in (1.85 m)
- Listed weight: 194 lb (88 kg)

Career information
- High school: Gainesville (Gainesville, Georgia)
- College: Georgia Tech
- NFL draft: 1964: 6th round, 73rd overall pick
- AFL draft: 1964: 12th round, 95th overall pick

Career history
- Dallas Cowboys (1964); Baltimore Colts (1965)*; Los Angeles Rams (1965); Atlanta Falcons (1966–1971); Miami Dolphins (1972)
- * Offseason or practice squad member only

Awards and highlights
- Super Bowl champion (VII); First-team All-Pro (1968); 2× NFL punting yards leader (1967, 1968); SEC Back of the Year (1963); First-team All-American (1963); 2× First-team All-SEC (1962, 1963); Georgia Tech Sports Hall of Fame; Georgia Sports Hall of Fame

Career NFL statistics
- Punts: 532
- Punting yards: 21,792
- Punting average: 41
- Longest punt: 75
- Interceptions: 3
- Fumble recoveries: 2
- Stats at Pro Football Reference

William Lamar Lothridge (January 1, 1942 — February 23, 1996) was an American professional football player who was a punter and safety in the National Football League (NFL) for the Dallas Cowboys, the Los Angeles Rams, the Atlanta Falcons and the Miami Dolphins. He played college football for the Georgia Tech Yellow Jackets.

== Early life ==
Lothridge was a graduate of Gainesville High School in Gainesville, Georgia where he played quarterback. He teamed with Billy Martin both at Gainesville and later in Georgia Tech to form a dominant passing/rushing attack. As a senior, he received All-State and All-Southern honors.

He accepted a football scholarship from Georgia Tech and became a starter as a junior, registering 1,006 passing yards, 6 passing touchdowns, 8 interceptions, 478 rushing yards and 9 rushing touchdowns.

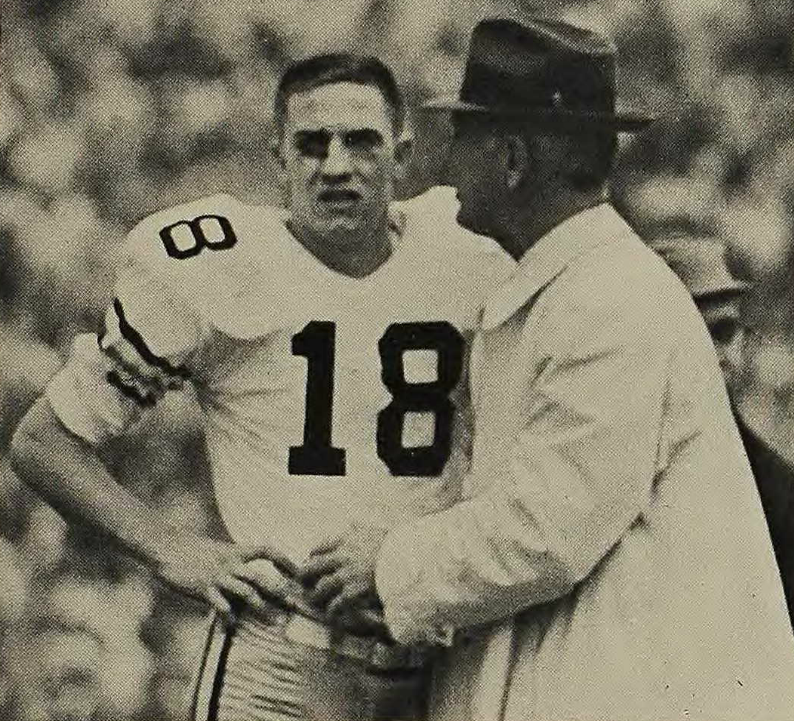
Lothridge with Bobby Dodd in 1962.

As a senior in 1963, he posted 1,017 passing yards, 10 passing touchdowns, 7 interceptions, 223 rushing yards and 3 rushing touchdowns. He ranked fourth in nation in scoring, tenth in punting (40.8 average) and finished second in the Heisman Trophy voting behind Roger Staubach.

In 1969, he was inducted into the Georgia Tech Sports Hall of Fame. In 1986, he was inducted into the Georgia Sports Hall of Fame.

== Professional career ==
=== Dallas Cowboys ===
Lothridge was selected by the Dallas Cowboys in the sixth round (73rd overall) of the 1964 NFL draft and by the Oakland Raiders in the 12th round (95th overall) of the 1964 AFL draft. He signed with the Cowboys to be a punter and placekicker.

As a rookie, even though he tore a ligament in his left knee in training camp, he was named the team's punter and third-team quarterback. His net punting average of 37.9 yards wasn't reached by another Cowboy until the 2006 season (Mat McBriar-38.6 yards). He also tied a franchise record with a 75-yard punt in the fifth game against the New York Giants.

On August 29, 1965, he was traded along with a fourth round draft choice (#54-Rod Sherman) to the Baltimore Colts, in exchange for the rights to future All-Pro Ralph Neely.

=== Baltimore Colts ===
Lothridge was waived by the Baltimore Colts before the start of the 1965 season and was subsequently claimed by the Los Angeles Rams.

=== Los Angeles Rams ===
After playing in 9 games he was waived on November 17, 1965.

=== Atlanta Falcons ===
On November 25, 1965, he signed with the Atlanta Falcons as one of the team's original players. He won the NFL punting title in 1967 with a 43.7 average and repeated the next year with a 42.8 average, while receiving All-Pro honors. In 1968, he was also a starter at safety and had 3 interceptions. He retired before the start of the 1971 season, but was brought back when the team experienced punting problems. He was waived before the start of the 1972 season.

=== Miami Dolphins ===
On November 22, 1972, he was signed by the Miami Dolphins to replace an injured Larry Seiple. He punted for the Dolphins for 2 games, but was then placed on the team's taxi squad to make room to activate quarterback Bob Griese, even though Seiple was not quite ready to play (safety Dick Anderson had to serve as the team's punter for one game until Seiple returned). Although he was not active for the last 2 games of the season or for the playoffs, he got a chance to be a part of the Dolphins perfect season.

== Personal life ==
Lothridge died in 1996, after suffering three heart attacks over a four-year period.

== See also ==
- List of Georgia Tech Yellow Jackets starting quarterbacks
- Georgia Tech Yellow Jackets football statistical leaders
