= Pete Case =

American football player (1940–2008)

No. 67, 65
- Position: Guard

Personal information
- Born: December 27, 1940; Dayton, Ohio, U.S.
- Died: December 18, 2008 (aged 67); Georgia, U.S.
- Listed height: 6 ft 3 in (1.91 m)
- Listed weight: 245 lb (111 kg)

Career information
- High school: Decatur (Decatur, Georgia)
- College: Georgia (1958–1961)
- NFL draft: 1962: 2nd round, 27th overall pick
- AFL draft: 1962: 3rd round, 23rd overall pick

Career history
- Philadelphia Eagles (1962–1964); New York Giants (1965–1970)

Awards and highlights
- First-team All-SEC (1961)

Career NFL statistics
- Games played: 117
- Games started: 91
- Fumble recoveries: 6
- Stats at Pro Football Reference

Ronald Lee "Pete" Case (December 27, 1940 – December 18, 2008) was an American football offensive guard in the National Football League (NFL) who played for the Philadelphia Eagles and the New York Giants. He played college football at the University of Georgia and was drafted in the second round of the 1962 NFL draft. Case was also selected in the third round of the 1962 AFL draft by the Houston Oilers.
