= Howard Benton =

Canadian football player (born 1940)

Profile
- Position: Tackle

Personal information
- Born: 1940 (age 85–86); United States
- Listed height: 6 ft 2 in (1.88 m)
- Listed weight: 250 lb (113 kg)

Career information
- High school: McComb
- College: Mississippi State

Career history
- 1963: Edmonton Eskimos

Howard Benton (born 1940) is an American-born Canadian football player who played for the Edmonton Eskimos.
