= Joe Namath =

American football player (born 1943)

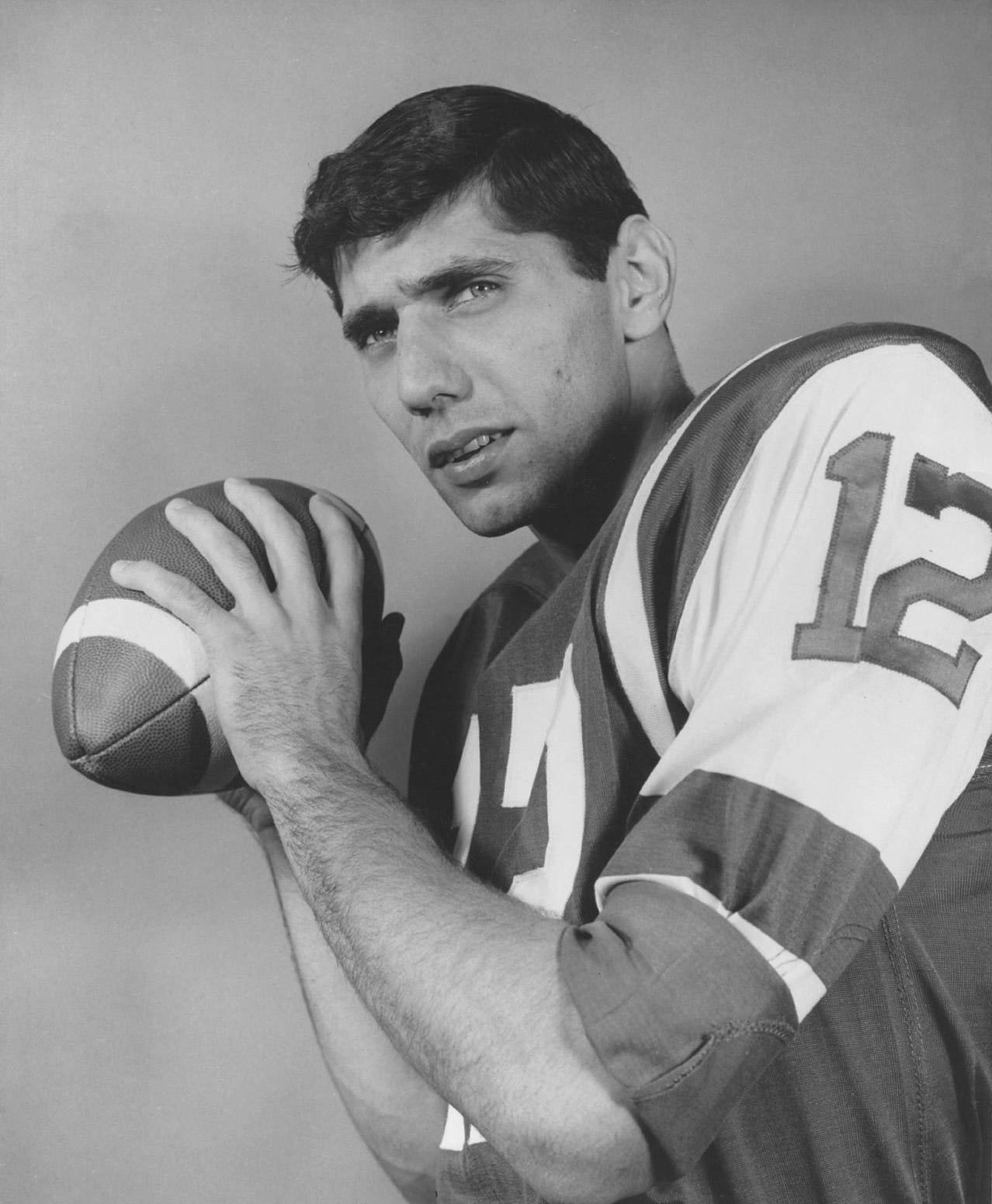
- Namath as a rookie with the New York Jets in 1965

No. 12
- Position: Quarterback

Personal information
- Born: May 31, 1943 (age 83); Beaver Falls, Pennsylvania, U.S.
- Listed height: 6 ft 2 in (1.88 m)
- Listed weight: 200 lb (91 kg)

Career information
- High school: Beaver Falls
- College: Alabama (1961–1964)
- NFL draft: 1965: 1st round, 12th overall pick
- AFL draft: 1965: 1st round, 1st overall pick

Career history
- New York Jets (1965–1976); Los Angeles Rams (1977)

Awards and highlights
- Super Bowl champion (III); Super Bowl MVP (III); AFL Rookie of the Year (1965); AFL champion (1968); AFL Championship MVP (1968); 2× AFL passing yards leader (1966, 1967); AFL Most Valuable Player (1968); NFL passing yards leader (1972); NFL passing touchdowns leader (1972); NFL Comeback Player of the Year (1974); First-team All-AFL (1968); Second-team All-Pro (1972); 3× Second-team All-AFL (1966, 1967, 1969); Pro Bowl (1972); 4× AFL All-Star (1965, 1967–1969); George Halas Award (1969); AFL All-Time Team; Hickok Belt (1968); New York Jets Ring of Honor; New York Jets No. 12 retired; National champion (1964); First-team All-SEC (1964); 2× Second-team All-SEC (1962, 1963)

Career AFL/NFL statistics
- Passing attempts: 3,762
- Passing completions: 1,886
- Completion percentage: 50.1%
- TD–INT: 173–220
- Passing yards: 27,663
- Passer rating: 65.5
- Stats at Pro Football Reference
- Pro Football Hall of Fame

Joseph William Namath (/ˈneɪməθ/; NAY-məth; born May 31, 1943) is an American former professional football quarterback who played in the American Football League (AFL) and National Football League (NFL) for 13 seasons, primarily with the New York Jets. Nicknamed "Broadway Joe", he played college football for the Alabama Crimson Tide, receiving first-team All-SEC honors and winning the national championship in 1964. Namath was selected by the Jets first overall in the 1965 AFL draft.

During his five AFL seasons, Namath was a two-time MVP and twice led the league in passing yards, while winning one AFL championship and one Super Bowl. Both victories remain the Jets' only championships. Following the 1970 AFL–NFL merger, Namath joined the NFL with the Jets, earning Pro Bowl and second-team All-Pro honors in 1972 after leading the league in passing yards and passing touchdowns. He played in New York for seven more seasons and spent his final year as a member of the Los Angeles Rams.

Namath cemented his legacy in 1969 when he guaranteed his heavy underdog Jets would win Super Bowl III before defeating the NFL's Baltimore Colts in one of the greatest sports upsets of all time. The Super Bowl victory was the first for an AFL franchise, helping dismiss notions that its teams were inferior to the NFL's and demonstrating they would enter the merger as equals. Namath received Super Bowl MVP honors in the game, while also becoming the first quarterback to win both a college national championship and a major professional championship. He was inducted to the Pro Football Hall of Fame in 1985.

== Early life ==
Namath was born and raised in Beaver Falls, Pennsylvania, 30 miles (50 km) northwest of Pittsburgh. He grew up in the Lower End neighborhood of Beaver Falls. Namath is the son of Catholic parents, Rose (née Juhász) and János "John Andrew" Namath, a steelworker, both of Hungarian descent. His Hungarian-born grandfather, András "Andrew" Németh, known as "A.J." to his family and friends, came to Ellis Island on the steamer Pannonia in 1911, and worked in the coal and steel industries of the Greater Pittsburgh area.

While growing up, Namath was close to both of his parents, who eventually divorced. Following his parents' divorce, Namath lived with his mother. He was the youngest of four sons, with an older adopted sister.

Namath excelled in all sports at Beaver Falls High School and was a standout quarterback in football, guard in basketball, and outfielder in baseball. In an age when dunks were uncommon in high school basketball, Namath regularly dunked in games. He later clarified a story about being the only white player on his high school basketball team on The James Brown Show in 2018, where he was the guest. Namath stated that although he was one of several white players on the team, he was the only white starter. Coached by Larry Bruno at Beaver Falls, Namath's football team won the WPIAL Class AA championship with a 9–0 record in 1960. Coach Bruno later presented Namath to the Pro Football Hall of Fame in Canton.

Upon graduating from high school in 1961, Namath received offers from several Major League Baseball teams, including the Yankees, Indians, Reds, Pirates, and Phillies, but football prevailed. Namath told interviewers that he wanted to sign with the Pirates and play baseball like his idol, Roberto Clemente, but elected to play football because his mother wanted him to get a college education. Namath enrolled at the University of Alabama, but left before graduating in order to pursue a career in professional football. However, a college degree was finally conferred on Namath at age 64, after he completed an external-program Bachelor of Arts degree in interdisciplinary studies at the University of Alabama in 2007.

Namath had many offers from Division I college football programs, including Penn State, Ohio State, Alabama, and Notre Dame, but initially decided upon the University of Maryland after being heavily recruited by Maryland assistant coach Roland Arrigoni. He was rejected by Maryland because his college-board scores were just below the school's requirements. After ample recruiting by Coach Paul 'Bear' Bryant, Namath accepted a full scholarship to attend Alabama. Bryant stated that his decision to recruit Namath was "the best coaching decision I ever made."

== College career ==
Between 1962 and 1964, Namath quarterbacked the Alabama Crimson Tide program under Bryant and his offensive coordinator, Howard Schnellenberger. A year after being suspended for the final two games of the regular season, Namath led the Tide to a national championship in 1964. During his time at the University of Alabama, Namath led the team to a 29–4 record over three seasons.

Bryant called Namath "the greatest athlete I ever coached". When Namath was inducted into the Pro Football Hall of Fame in 1985, he teared up during his induction speech upon mentioning Bryant, who had died of a heart attack two years prior.

Namath attended college at the height of the civil rights movement (1955–1968) in the South, and was present when Governor George Wallace stood at the school's auditorium.

In 1964, despite suffering a nagging knee injury in the fourth game of his senior year at Alabama, Namath limped through the undefeated regular season to the Orange Bowl. The cartilage damage to Namath's right knee later designated him class 4-F for the military draft, a deferment from service during the Vietnam War. Namath was eleventh in the voting for the 1964 Heisman Trophy, which was won by quarterback John Huarte of Notre Dame.

== Professional career ==
In late 1964, the then still separate NFL and upstart AFL were at the height of their bidding war, and held their respective drafts on the same day, November 28. Namath was a first-round draft selection by both leagues: the St. Louis Cardinals selected him 12th overall in the 1965 NFL draft, while the Jets made him the first overall pick in the AFL draft.

When meeting with executives of the Cardinals, Namath's salary request was $200,000 and a new Lincoln Continental. While initially surprised at his demands, the Cardinals told Namath they would agree to his terms only if he would sign before the Orange Bowl, which would have made Namath ineligible to play in the game. The day after the Orange Bowl, he elected to sign with the Jets, under the direction of Sonny Werblin, for a salary of US$427,000 over three years (a pro football record at the time). Offensive tackle Sherman Plunkett came up with the nickname "Broadway Joe" in 1965, following Namath's appearance on the cover of Sports Illustrated in July. Namath would eventually be on the cover of Sports Illustrated 22 times.

=== New York Jets ===
In Namath's rookie season the 1965 Jets were winless in their first six games with him splitting time with second-year quarterback Mike Taliaferro. With Namath starting full-time they won five of the last eight of a fourteen-game season and Namath was named the AFL Rookie of the year.

Namath became the first professional quarterback to pass for 4,000 yards in a season when he threw for 4,007 yards during a 14-game season in 1967, a record broken by Dan Fouts in a 16-game season in 1979 (4,082). Although Namath was plagued with knee injuries through much of his career and underwent four pioneering knee operations by Dr. James A. Nicholas, Namath was an AFL All-Star in 1965, 1967, 1968, and 1969. On some occasions, he had to have his knee drained at halftime so he could finish a game. Later in life, long after leaving football, Namath underwent knee replacement surgery on both legs.

In the 1968 AFL title game, Namath threw three touchdowns to lead New York to a 27–23 victory over the defending AFL champion Oakland Raiders. His performance in the 1968 season earned him the Hickok Belt as top professional athlete of the year. Namath was an AFC–NFC Pro Bowler in 1972, is a member of the Jets' and the American Football League's All-Time Team, and was elected to the Hall of Fame in 1985.

In 1967, Namath led the AFL in yards per passing attempt (8.2), and repeated this again in the NFL in 1972 (8.7), making him the only player in history to lead both leagues in yards per passing attempt in a season.

==== Super Bowl III ====
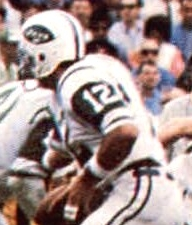
Namath running a play for the New York Jets in Super Bowl III in 1969

The high point of Namath's career was his performance in the Jets' 16–7 victory over the Baltimore Colts in Super Bowl III in January 1969, shortly before the AFL–NFL merger. The first two interleague championship games had resulted in blowout victories for the NFL's Green Bay Packers, and sports writers from NFL cities insisted the AFL would take several more years to be truly competitive. The 1968 Colts were touted as "the greatest football team in history", and former NFL star and Atlanta Falcons head coach Norm Van Brocklin ridiculed the AFL before the game, saying "I'll tell you what I think about Joe Namath on Sunday night—after he has played his first pro game." Three days before the game, Namath was tired of addressing the issue in the press, and he responded to a heckler at a sports banquet in Miami with the line: "We're going to win the game. I guarantee it."

Namath backed up his boast, which became legendary. The Colts' vaunted defense (highlighted by Bubba Smith) was unable to contain either the Jets' running or passing game, while the ineffective offense gave up four interceptions to the Jets. Namath was the Super Bowl MVP, completing eight passes to George Sauer Jr. alone for 133 yards. The win made him the first quarterback to start and win a national championship game in college, a major professional league championship, and a Super Bowl.

The Jets' win gave the AFL instant legitimacy even to skeptics. When he was asked by reporters after the game whether the Colts' defense was the "toughest he had ever faced", Namath responded, "That would be the Buffalo Bills' defense." The AFL-worst Bills had intercepted Namath five times, three for touchdowns, in their only win in 1968 in late September.

==== Later career with the Jets ====
After not missing a single game because of injury in his first five years in the league, Namath played in just 28 of 58 possible games between 1970 and 1973 because of various injuries. After winning division championships in 1968 and 1969, the Jets struggled to records of 4–10, 6–8, 7–7, and 4–10. His most memorable moment in those four seasons came on September 24, 1972, when he and his boyhood idol Johnny Unitas combined for 872 passing yards in Baltimore. Namath threw for 496 yards and six touchdowns on only 15 completions and Unitas 376 yards and three touchdowns in a 44–34 New York victory over the Colts, its first against Baltimore since Super Bowl III. The game is considered by many NFL experts to be the finest display of passing in a single game in league history. Another notable moment was in 1970, when the head of ABC's televised sports, Roone Arledge, made sure that Monday Night Football's inaugural game on September 21, featured Namath. The Jets met the Cleveland Browns in Cleveland Municipal Stadium in front of both a record crowd of 85,703 and a huge television audience. However, the Jets set a team record for penalties and lost on a late Namath interception.

The Chicago Winds of the World Football League (WFL) made an overture to Namath prior to the start of its 1975 season. First, they designed their uniforms nearly identically to that of the Jets, dropping red and going with green and white, to allow Namath to continue marketing his number 12 jersey in Jets colors. Then they offered Namath a contract worth $600,000 a year for three years; a $2 million annuity ($100,000 per year for 20 years); a $500,000 signing bonus; and terms for Namath's eventual ownership of a WFL franchise. The WFL's television provider, TVS Television Network, insisted on the Winds' signing Namath to continue broadcasts. Upon this development, Namath, in turn, requested the lofty sum of 15 percent of the entire league's television revenue, which was rejected by the league. Without a national television deal, the WFL instead opted to fold a month later.

=== Los Angeles Rams ===
After 12 years with the Jets, Namath was waived prior to the 1977 season to facilitate a move to the Los Angeles Rams when a trade could not be worked out. Signing on May 12, Namath hoped to revitalize his career, but knee injuries, a bad hamstring, and the general ravages of 13 years as a quarterback in professional football had taken their toll. After playing well in a 2–1 start, Namath took a beating in a one-point road-loss on a cold, windy, and rainy Monday Night Football game against the Chicago Bears, throwing four interceptions and having a fifth nullified by a penalty. He was benched as a starter for the rest of the season (in favor of Pat Haden) and retired at its end.

== Career statistics ==
=== AFL/NFL ===
Legend
	AFL MVP
	Won the Super Bowl
	Led the league
**Bold**	Career high

Year	Team	Games			Passing								
Year	Team	GP	GS	Record	Cmp	Att	Pct	Yds	Avg	TD	Int	Lng	Rtg
1965	NYJ	13	9	3−5−1	164	340	48.2	2,220	6.5	18	15	62	68.7
1966	NYJ	14	13	5−6−2	232	471	49.3	3,379	7.2	19	27	77	62.6
1967	NYJ	14	14	8−5−1	**258**	**491**	52.5	**4,007**	8.2	**26**	**28**	75	73.8
1968	NYJ	14	14	**11−3**	187	380	49.2	3,147	8.3	15	17	87	72.1
1969	NYJ	14	14	10−4	185	361	51.2	2,734	7.6	19	17	60	**74.3**
1970	NYJ	5	5	1−4	90	179	50.3	1,259	7.0	5	12	72	54.7
1971	NYJ	4	3	2−1	28	59	47.5	537	9.1	5	6	74	68.2
1972	NYJ	13	13	7−6	162	324	50.0	2,816	**8.7**	19	21	83	72.5
1973	NYJ	6	5	2−3	68	133	51.1	966	7.3	5	6	63	68.7
1974	NYJ	14	14	7−7	191	361	**52.9**	2,616	7.2	20	22	89	69.4
1975	NYJ	14	13	3−10	157	326	48.2	2,286	7.0	15	**28**	**91**	51.0
1976	NYJ	11	8	1−7	114	230	49.6	1,090	4.7	4	16	35	39.9
1977	LAR	4	4	2−2	50	107	46.7	606	5.7	3	5	42	54.5
Career		140	129	62−63−4	1,886	3,762	50.1	27,663	7.4	173	220	91	65.5

=== College ===
Season	Passing							Rushing	
Season	Cmp	Att	Yds	Pct	TD	Int	Rtg	Att	Yds
1962	76	146	1,192	52.1	13	8	139.1	70	321
1963	63	128	765	49.2	7	7	106.5	76	201
1964	64	100	756	64.0	5	4	136.0	44	133
Career	203	374	2,713	54.3	25	19	127.1	190	655

== Awards and honors ==
NFL

- Super Bowl champion (III)
- Super Bowl MVP (III)
- AFL Rookie of the Year (1965)
- AFL champion (1968)
- AFL Championship MVP (1968)
- 2× AFL passing yards leader (1966, 1967)
- AFL Most Valuable Player (1968)
- NFL passing yards leader (1972)
- NFL passing touchdowns leader (1972)
- NFL Comeback Player of the Year (1974)
- First-team All-AFL (1968)
- Second-team All-Pro (1972)
- 3× Second-team All-AFL (1966, 1967, 1969)
- Pro Bowl (1972)
- 4× AFL All-Star (1965, 1967–1969)
- George Halas Award (1969)
- AFL All-Time Team
- Hickok Belt (1968)
- New York Jets Ring of Honor
- New York Jets No. 12 retired

College

- National champion (1964)
- First-team All-SEC (1964)
- 2× Second-team All-SEC (1962, 1963)

== Acting career ==
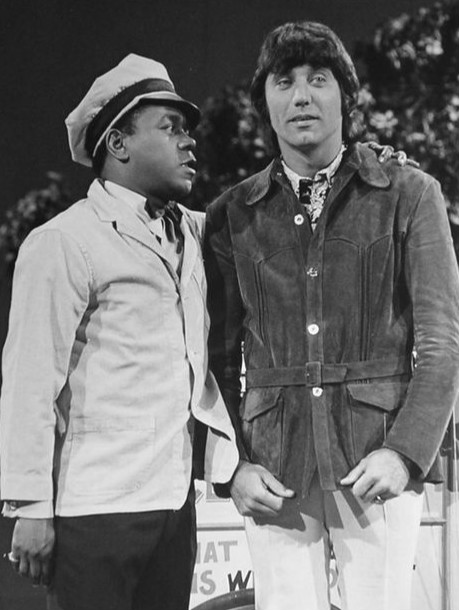
Flip Wilson and Namath on The Flip Wilson Show in 1972

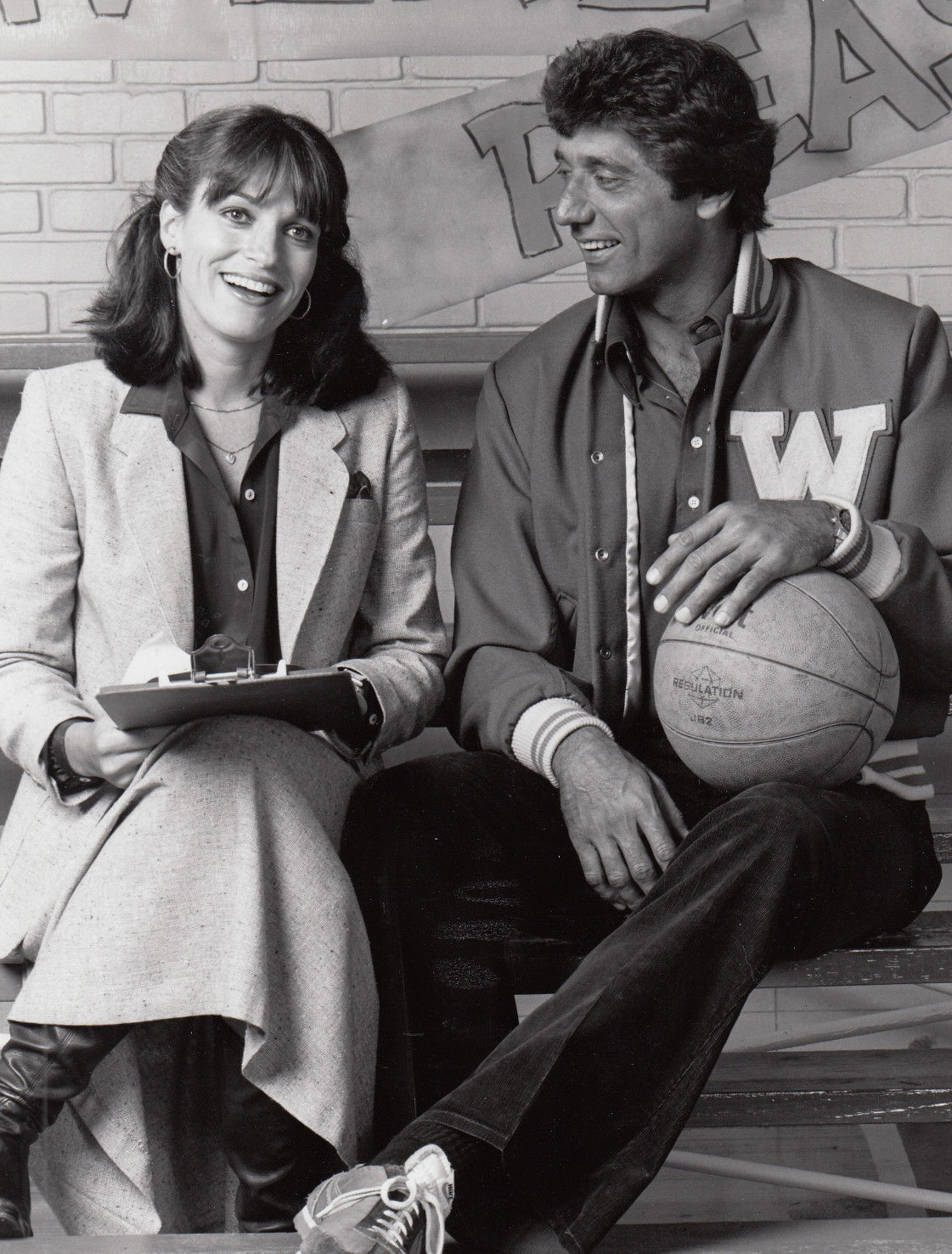
Gwynne Gilford and Namath on The Waverly Wonders in 1978

Building on his brief success as a host on 1969's The Joe Namath Show, Namath transitioned into an acting career. He starred in several movies, including C.C. and Company with Ann-Margret and William Smith in 1970, appeared on stage in "Picnic" with Donna Mills in 1971 and was in a brief 1978 television series, The Waverly Wonders. He guest-starred on numerous television shows, often as himself, including The Love Boat; Married... with Children; Here's Lucy; The Brady Bunch; The Sonny & Cher Comedy Hour; The Flip Wilson Show; Rowan & Martin's Laugh-In; The Dean Martin Show; The Simpsons; The A-Team; ALF; Kate & Allie; and The John Larroquette Show. Namath was a candidate to host the 1988 revival of the American game show Family Feud, before the job went to comedian Ray Combs.

Namath appeared in summer stock productions of Damn Yankees, Fiddler on the Roof, and Li'l Abner, and finally legitimized his "Broadway Joe" nickname as a cast replacement in a New York revival of The Caine Mutiny Court Martial in 1983. He guest hosted The Tonight Show Starring Johnny Carson several times and also served as a color commentator on NFL broadcasts, including the 1985 season of Monday Night Football and several years with NBC Sports. In September 2012, Namath was honored by the Ride of Fame and a double-decker tour bus was dedicated to him in New York City. He appeared as himself in the 2013 sports film Underdogs and the 2015 comedy film The Wedding Ringer.

=== Filmography ===
Film
Year	Title	Role	Notes
1970	Norwood	Joe	
1970	C.C. and Company	C.C. Ryder	
1971	The Last Rebel	"Captain" Hollis	
1979	Avalanche Express	Leroy	
1980	Marriage Is Alive and Well	Brian Fish	TV movie
1984	Chattanooga Choo Choo	Newt Newton	
1991	Going Under	Captain Joe Namath	
1993	Green Visionary	Dwight Galbreath	
2012	Well Received the Death of an Artist	—N/a	
2013	Underdogs	Himself	
2015	The Wedding Ringer	Himself	

Television (selected credits)
Year	Title	Role	Notes
1966	ABC Stage 67	Quarterback	Episode: "Olympus 7-0000"
1969	The Joe Namath Show	Himself	13 episodes
1970	The Dean Martin Show	Himself	Season 6, episode 2
1971	Rowan & Martin's Laugh-In	—N/a	Guest performer; uncredited
1971–1973	The Flip Wilson Show	Himself	3 episodes
1972	Here's Lucy	Himself	Episode: "Lucy and Joe Namath"
1973	The Brady Bunch	Himself	Episode: "Mail Order Hero"
1973–1974	The Sonny & Cher Comedy Hour	Himself	4 episodes
1974	The Dean Martin Show	Himself	Celebrity Roast: Joe Namath
1978	The Waverly Wonders	Joe Casey	Main role; 9 episodes
1980	The Love Boat	Rod Baylor	Episode: "Rent a Romeo" / "Matchmaker, Matchmaker" / "Y' Gotta Have Heart"
1981	The Love Boat	Ted Harper	Episode: "Maid for Each Other" / "Lost and Found" / "Then There Were Two"
1981	Fantasy Island	Clay Garrett	Episode: "Basin Street" / "The Devil's Triangle"
1986	The A-Team	T. J. Bryant	Episode: "Quarterback Sneak"
1986	ALF	Himself	Episode: "Jump"
1988	Kate & Allie	Himself	Episode: "The Namath of the Game"
1993	The John Larroquette Show	Himself	Episode: "Amends"
1993	Married... with Children	Himself	Episode: "Dances with Weezie"
1997	The Simpsons	Himself	Episode: "Bart Star"
2013	The Simpsons	Himself	Episode: "Four Regrettings and a Funeral"

== Personal life ==
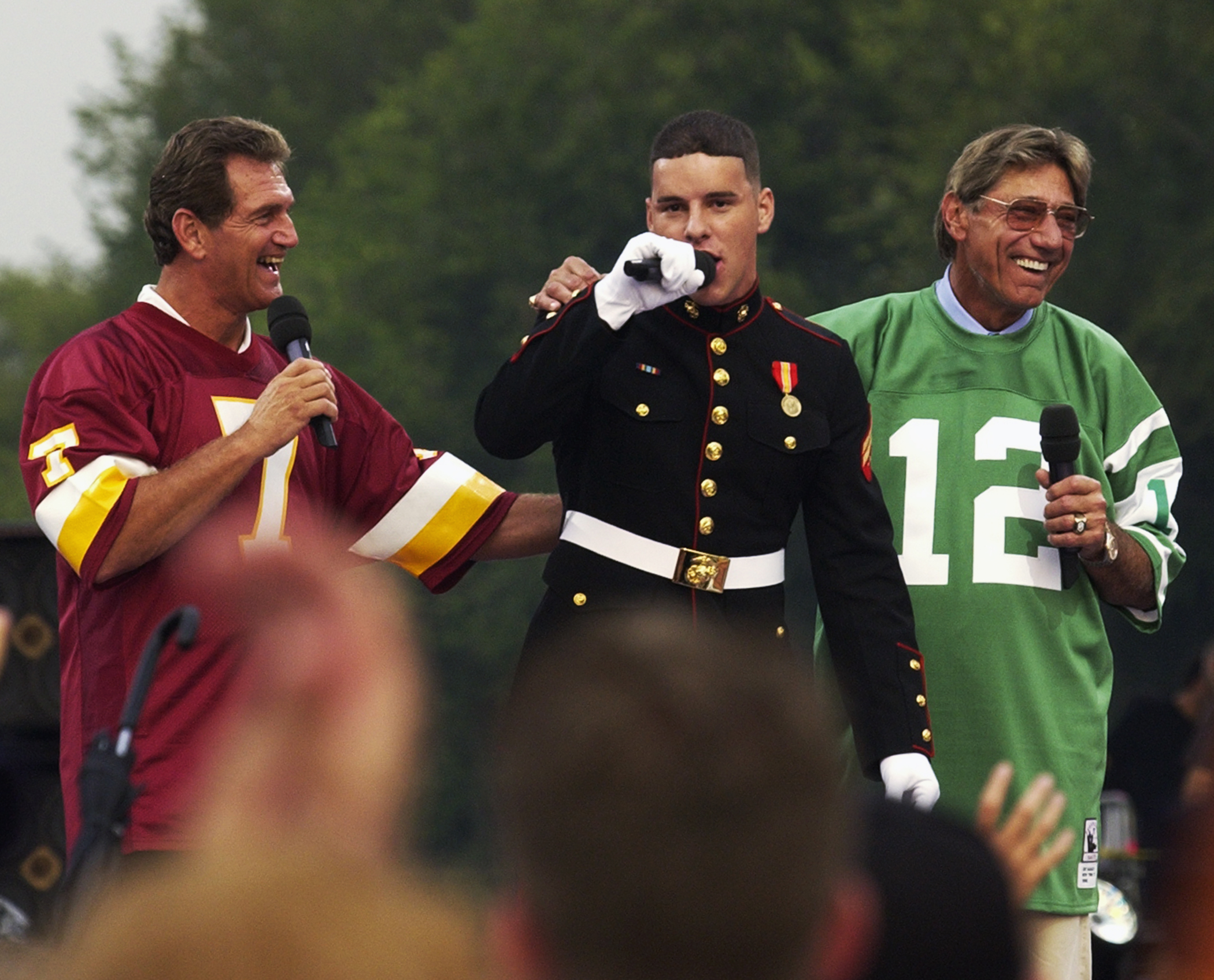
Joe Theismann (L) and Namath (R) at the NFL Kickoff Live concert in 2003

Namath was the only athlete listed on the master list of Richard Nixon's political opponents, which was made public in 1973 during the Watergate investigation, erroneously listed as playing for the New York Giants. White House Counsel John Dean claimed not to know why Namath was included on the list and suggested that it might have been a mistake. Namath addressed this on The Tonight Show Starring Johnny Carson on July 20, 1973.

Namath dated actress and fashion model Randi Oakes, actress and lawyer Louisa Moritz, singer and songwriter Janis Joplin, and actresses Jill St. John, Mamie Van Doren, and Raquel Welch.

While taking a voice class in 1983, Namath met Deborah Mays, who later changed her first name to May and then changed it again to Tatiana, an aspiring actress; he was 39 and she was 22. They married in 1984, with Namath claiming, "She caught my last pass." The longtime bachelor became a dedicated family man when the couple had two children, Jessica (born 1986) and Olivia (born 1991). The couple divorced in 2000, with the children living in Florida with their father. In May 2007, Olivia gave birth to a daughter, Natalia. Olivia lives in California with her three kids. Namath also has three other grandchildren named John, Emerson, and Jemma, who live next to him with their mother, Jessica. Namath practices transcendental meditation and has adopted a collie/shepherd, Zoie, from a local rescue shelter. He co-owns the Lucky Shuck, a waterside restaurant overlooking the Jupiter Inlet and lighthouse.

For the early years of his marriage, Namath continued to struggle with his alcoholism until his wife warned him that he could break up his family if he continued. By 1987, Namath was able to stop his drinking, though he would relapse after his divorce in 2000.

On December 20, 2003, Namath garnered unfavorable publicity after he consumed too much alcohol during a day that was dedicated to the Jets' announcement of their All-Time team. During live ESPN coverage of the team's game, Namath was asked about then-Jets quarterback Chad Pennington and his thoughts on the difficulties of that year's team. Namath expressed confidence in Pennington, but then stated to interviewer Suzy Kolber, "I want to kiss you. I couldn't care less about the team struggling." He subsequently apologized, and several weeks later entered into an outpatient alcoholism treatment program. In 2019, Namath said he used the incident as motivation to quit alcohol, explaining "I had embarrassed my friends and family and could not escape that feeling. I haven't had a drink since."

In July 2015, Namath joined the search for two boys who disappeared during a fishing trip off the coast of Florida, and offered a $100,000 reward for the safe return of the boys. The boat was found six days later, and the search was suspended, with the two boys presumed dead.

On June 6, 2018, Namath threw out the first pitch at a Chicago Cubs baseball game at Wrigley Field. The pitch was caught by then-Cubs manager Joe Maddon, who idolized Namath as a child. This was Namath's first time at Wrigley Field.

Namath currently resides in Tequesta, Florida.

=== Bachelors III ===
After the Super Bowl victory in 1969, Namath opened a popular Upper East Side nightclub called Bachelors III, which not only drew big names in sports, entertainment, and politics, but also organized crime. To protect the league's reputation, NFL Commissioner Pete Rozelle ordered Namath to divest himself of his interest in the venture. Namath refused, apparently retiring from football during a teary news conference, but he eventually recanted and agreed to sell the club, and reported to the Jets in time for the 1969–70 season. Namath again threatened to retire before the 1970 and 1971 seasons; New York wrote in 1971 that "his retirement act had become shallow and predictable". The magazine stated that Namath did not want to attend training camp because of the risk of injury, but could not afford to retire permanently because of poor investments.

== Legacy ==
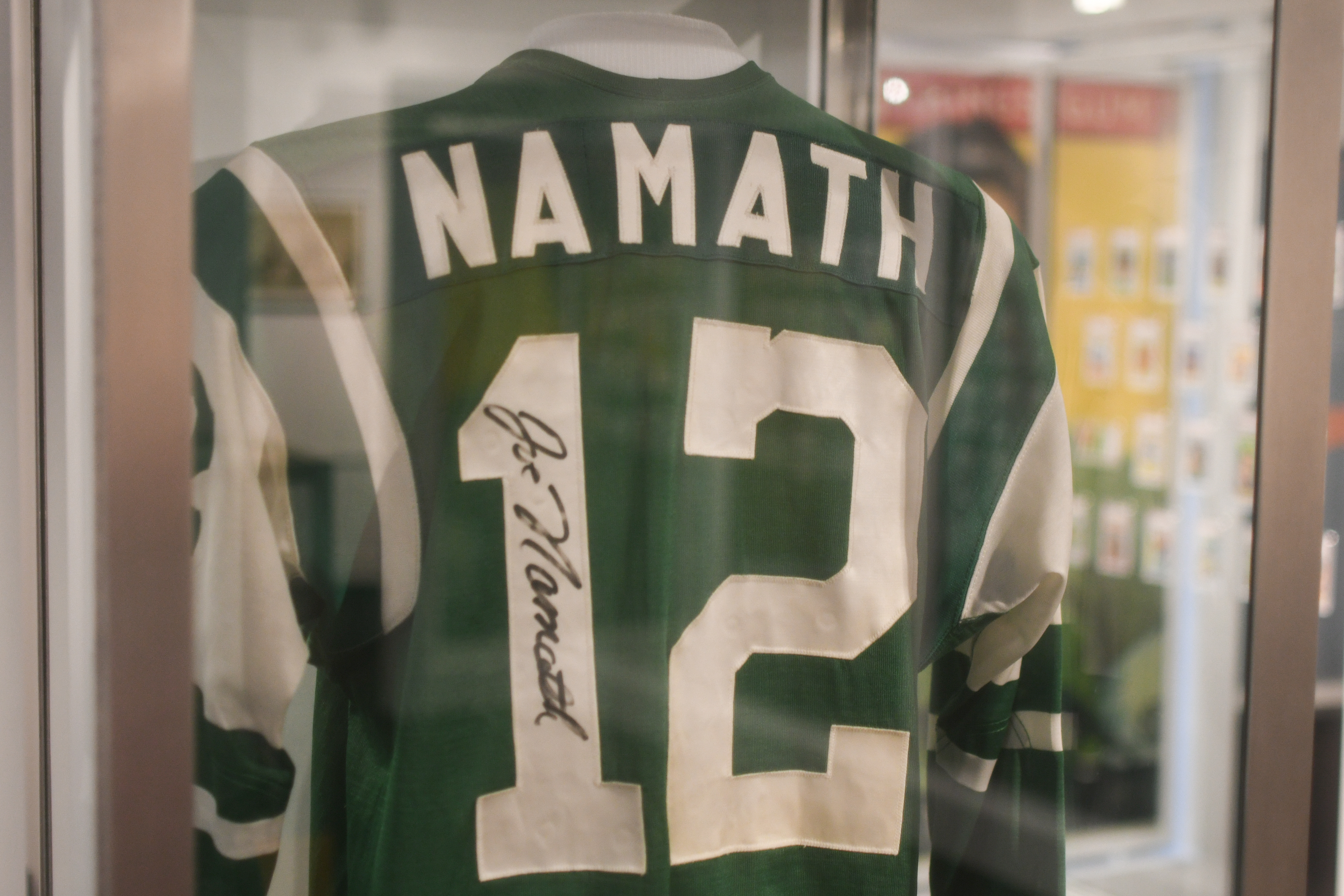
Namath's signed New York Jets #12 jersey on display at the Pro Football Hall of Fame in Canton

=== Media and advertising icon ===
Namath's prowess on the field, fashion sense, lighthearted personality, and status as a sex symbol made him the first sports figure to appeal equally to men, women, and children—as demonstrated by his various product endorsements over the years. His nickname "Broadway Joe" was given to him by Sherman Plunkett, a Jets teammate. "Joe Willie Namath" was Namath's moniker based on his full given name and was popularized by sportscaster Howard Cosell. On the field, Namath stood out from other AFL and NFL players in low-cut white shoes rather than traditional black high-tops. The white shoes started when Namath was at Alabama, where he kept having his worn-out cleats taped over as a superstition, especially after his first major knee injury was the result of a game in which he had forgotten to have the shoes taped. When he joined the Jets, Namath continued to have his shoes taped until Jets coach Weeb Ewbank noticed that the excess tape usage was costing the team money, so he ordered white cleats for Namath. He originated the fad of wearing a full-length fur coat on the sidelines (since banned by the NFL, which requires all players, coaches, athletic trainers, et al., to wear league-approved team apparel).

Namath also appeared in television advertisements both during and after his playing career, most notably for Ovaltine milk flavoring, Noxzema shaving cream (in which he was shaved by a then-unknown Farrah Fawcett), and Hanes Beautymist pantyhose (which he famously wore in the commercials). All of these commercials contributed to his becoming a pop-culture icon.

Namath continues to serve as an unofficial spokesman and goodwill ambassador of the Jets. In 2011, Namath was representing Topps and promoting a "Super Bowl Legends" contest, appearing on its behalf on the Late Show with David Letterman. For Super Bowl XLVIII which was hosted in the Jets' MetLife Stadium, Namath and his daughter Jessica wore fur coats for the ceremonial coin toss to "bring back a little of that flash from his heyday" as a player.

On June 2, 2013, Namath was the guest speaker at the Pro Football Hall of Fame, unveiling the Canton, Ohio museum's $27 million expansion and renovation plan.

As of 2018, Namath is the spokesperson for the insurance agency Medicare Coverage Helpline.

=== Biographies ===
In November 2006, the book Namath: A Biography by Mark Kriegel was published, reaching the New York Times extended bestseller list. In conjunction with its release, Namath was interviewed for the November 19, 2006, edition of CBS' 60 Minutes. A documentary about Namath's hometown of Beaver Falls, Pennsylvania, includes a segment on Namath and why the city has celebrated its ties to him. In 2009, 40 years after winning Super Bowl III, he presented the Vince Lombardi Trophy to the Pittsburgh Steelers, who won Super Bowl XLIII. NFL Productions also produced a two-hour long television biography in its A Football Life series.

== Books ==
- Allen, Maury (1969). Joe Namath's Sportin' Life. Paperback Library. ASIN B0006CJ3OQ.
- Namath, Joe Willie; Schaap, Richard (1970). I Can't Wait Until Tomorrow... 'Cause I Get Better Looking Every Day. Signet. ASIN B00005W4MN.
- Namath, Joe; Oats Jr, Bob (1973). A Matter of Style. Little, Brown, & Company. ISBN 978-0316596909.
- Namath, Joe (2006). Namath. New York: Rugged Land Books. ISBN 1-59071-081-9.
- Namath, Joe (2019). All the Way: My Life in Four Quarters. New York: Little, Brown and Company. ISBN 978-0316421102.

== See also ==
- Namath: From Beaver Falls to Broadway
- List of American Football League players
- List of NFL players who have posted a perfect passer rating
- Living former players diagnosed with or reporting symptoms of chronic traumatic encephalopathy
