= Baker County High School (Glen St. Mary, Florida) =

Public high school in Baker County, Florida, United States

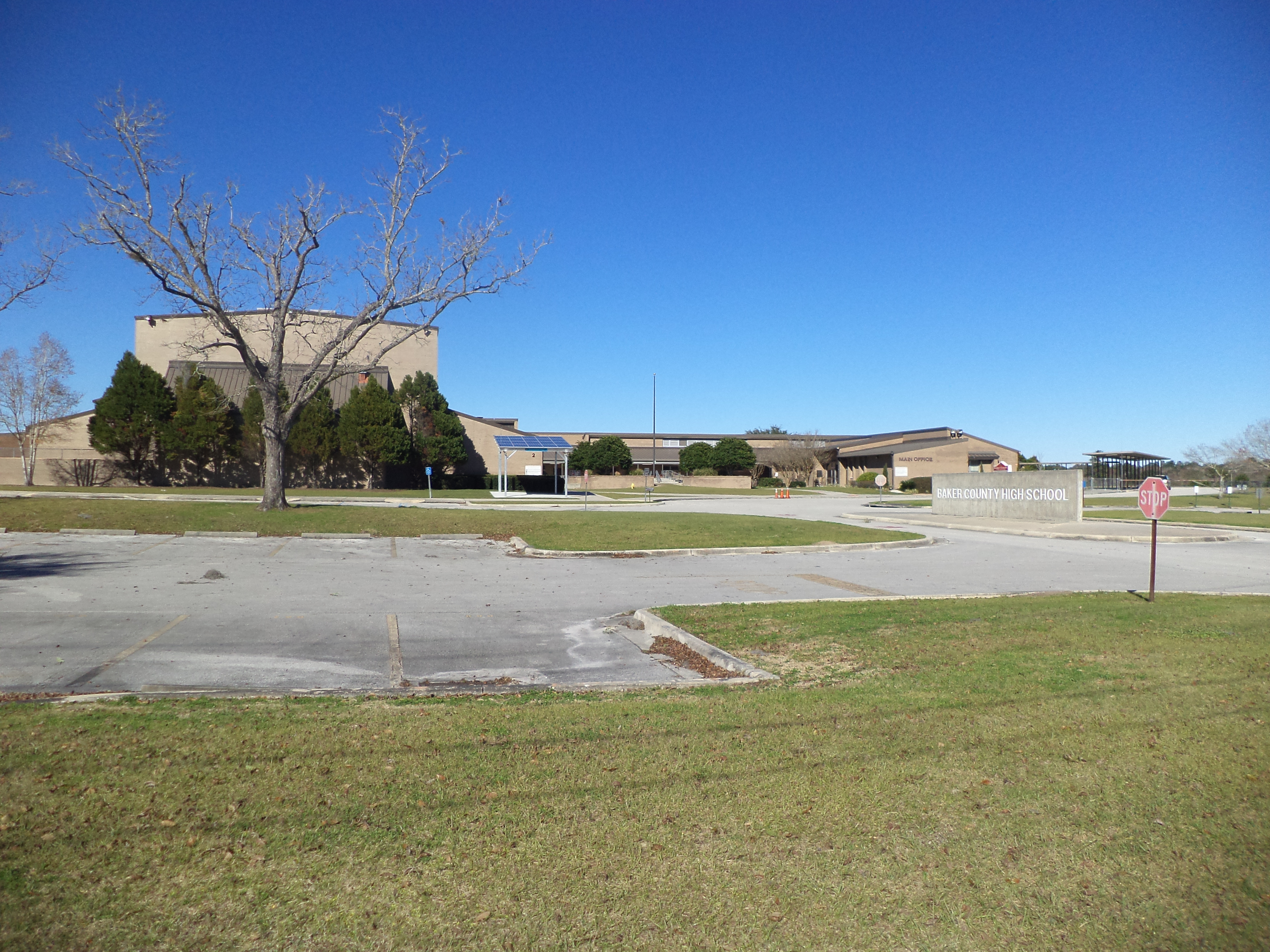

Location
- 1 Wildcat Drive; Glen St. Mary, Florida 32040; United States; 30.2812°N 82.1548°W

Information
- Type: Public
- School district: Baker County School District
- NCES School ID: 120006000035
- Principal: Andy Giddens
- Teaching staff: 80.00 (on an FTE basis)
- Grades: 9 to 12
- Enrollment: 1,436 (2023–2024)
- Student to teacher ratio: 17.95
- Colors: Red and White and Black
- Mascot: Wildcat
- Website: bchs.bakerk12.org

Baker County Senior High School is located in Glen St. Mary, Florida in Baker County, Florida, United States. It is part of the Baker County School District. The school's teams are known as the Wildcats.

== Notable alumni ==
- Cooper Hodges, NFL offensive tackle for the Jacksonville Jaguars
- Thomas Sirk, former NFL quarterback
