= Baker County School District (Florida) =

School district in Florida, United States

Address
- 392 South Boulevard East Macclenny, (Baker County), Florida, 32063; United States

District information
- Type: Public
- Grades: PreK-12
- Superintendent: Wyatt Milton
- NCES District ID: 1200060
- Enrollment: 5,407 (2019-2020)

Other information
- Website: www.bakerk12.org

Baker County School District is a public school district that covers Baker County, Florida.

== School Board Officials ==
The district's school board is elected on a non-partisan basis. The superintendent of schools is a non-partisan elected position.

- Superintendent of schools: Wyatt Milton
- District 1: Tiffany Harvey McInarnay (R)
- District 2: Jack Baker, Jr
- District 3: Emil Clayton Lyons, Jr (Gubernatorial Appointed)
- District 4: Mandi Canaday
- District 5: Amanda Rhoden Hodges (R)

== Schools ==
The district operates the following public schools:

=== High school ===
- Baker County High School (Wildcat)

Principal Andy Giddens

=== Middle schools ===
- Baker County Middle School

Principal Johnnie Jacobs

=== Elementary schools ===
- Legacy Elementary School

Principal Naomi Anderson

- Macclenny Elementary School

Principal Kelly Horne

- Westside Elementary School

Principal Lynn Green

=== Pre-K/Kindergarten Center ===
Principal: Bonnie Jones
