= Glen St. Mary, Florida =

- Town
- Town of Glen St. Mary
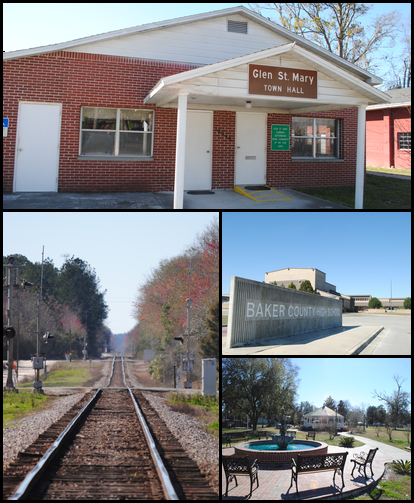
- Top, left to right: Glen St. Mary Town Hall, CSX Tallahassee Subdivision railroad, Baker County High School, Celebration Park

- Location in Baker County and the state of Florida
- Coordinates: 30°16′31″N 82°09′37″W
- Country: United States
- State: Florida
- County: Baker
- Settled (Cotton Field): c. 1829-1881
- Incorporated (Town of Glen St. Mary): 1957

Government
  - Type: Mayor-Council
  - Mayor: Juanice Padgett
  - Council Members: Terry Clardy, Stormy Greer, Lola Chandler, and Susan Wallace
  - Town Clerk: Jolene G. Kirkland
  - City Attorney: Jonathan S. Bense

Area
  - Total: 0.46 sq mi (1.19 km^{2})
  - Land: 0.46 sq mi (1.19 km^{2})
  - Water: 0 sq mi (0.00 km^{2})
- Elevation: 135 ft (41 m)

Population (2020)
  - Total: 463
  - Density: 1,011.3/sq mi (390.47/km^{2})
- Time zone: UTC-5 (Eastern (EST))
  - Summer (DST): UTC-4 (EDT)
- ZIP code: 32040
- Area code(s): 904, 324
- FIPS code: 12-26075
- GNIS feature ID: 2406577
- Website: glenstmary.govoffice.com

Glen St. Mary or Glen Saint Mary is a town in Baker County, Florida, United States. The Town of Glen St. Mary is part of the Jacksonville, Florida Metropolitan Statistical Area in North Florida. The population was 463 at the 2020 census, up from 437 at the 2010 census.

== Geography ==
U.S. Route 90 (Mount Vernon Avenue) runs through the center of town, and Interstate 10 passes through south of the town, with access from Exit 333 (Baker County Road 125).

According to the United States Census Bureau, the town has a total area of 0.4 square miles (1.0 km^{2}), all land.

=== Climate ===
The climate in this area is characterized by hot, humid summers and generally mild winters. According to the Köppen climate classification, the Town of Glen St. Mary has a humid subtropical climate zone (Cfa).

Climate data for Glen St. Mary, Florida, 1991–2020 normals, extremes 1919–present
Month	Jan	Feb	Mar	Apr	May	Jun	Jul	Aug	Sep	Oct	Nov	Dec	Year
Record high °F (°C)	89 (32)	89 (32)	91 (33)	95 (35)	102 (39)	104 (40)	102 (39)	100 (38)	99 (37)	97 (36)	90 (32)	86 (30)	104 (40)
Mean maximum °F (°C)	79.6 (26.4)	81.9 (27.7)	85.3 (29.6)	88.6 (31.4)	93.0 (33.9)	96.4 (35.8)	96.2 (35.7)	95.4 (35.2)	93.2 (34.0)	89.3 (31.8)	84.6 (29.2)	81.0 (27.2)	97.8 (36.6)
Mean daily maximum °F (°C)	67.1 (19.5)	70.6 (21.4)	75.9 (24.4)	81.7 (27.6)	87.6 (30.9)	91.1 (32.8)	92.8 (33.8)	91.8 (33.2)	88.8 (31.6)	82.5 (28.1)	75.0 (23.9)	69.4 (20.8)	81.2 (27.3)
Daily mean °F (°C)	53.5 (11.9)	57.1 (13.9)	61.8 (16.6)	67.5 (19.7)	74.2 (23.4)	79.8 (26.6)	82.0 (27.8)	81.6 (27.6)	78.6 (25.9)	70.6 (21.4)	62.1 (16.7)	56.2 (13.4)	68.7 (20.4)
Mean daily minimum °F (°C)	40.0 (4.4)	43.7 (6.5)	47.7 (8.7)	53.3 (11.8)	60.7 (15.9)	68.5 (20.3)	71.2 (21.8)	71.4 (21.9)	68.3 (20.2)	58.7 (14.8)	49.2 (9.6)	42.9 (6.1)	56.3 (13.5)
Mean minimum °F (°C)	23.6 (−4.7)	26.7 (−2.9)	30.0 (−1.1)	38.0 (3.3)	47.2 (8.4)	59.8 (15.4)	64.9 (18.3)	64.8 (18.2)	57.7 (14.3)	41.8 (5.4)	30.6 (−0.8)	27.6 (−2.4)	21.4 (−5.9)
Record low °F (°C)	7 (−14)	14 (−10)	21 (−6)	27 (−3)	37 (3)	45 (7)	54 (12)	52 (11)	40 (4)	29 (−2)	18 (−8)	9 (−13)	7 (−14)
Average precipitation inches (mm)	3.68 (93)	3.51 (89)	3.71 (94)	3.10 (79)	2.87 (73)	8.42 (214)	6.76 (172)	7.12 (181)	5.84 (148)	3.65 (93)	1.93 (49)	2.63 (67)	53.22 (1,352)
Average precipitation days (≥ 0.01 in)	8.2	7.6	7.7	5.9	6.3	13.5	13.9	14.5	10.2	6.8	5.5	6.2	106.3
Source: NOAA

== Demographics ==
Historical population
Census	Pop.	Note	%±
1960	329		—
1970	357		8.5%
1980	462		29.4%
1990	480		3.9%
2000	473		−1.5%
2010	437		−7.6%
2020	463		5.9%
U.S. Decennial Census

=== 2010 and 2020 census ===
Glen St. Mary racial composition (Hispanics excluded from racial categories) (NH = Non-Hispanic)
Race	Pop 2010	Pop 2020	% 2010	% 2020
White (NH)	407	412	93.14%	88.98%
Black or African American (NH)	10	17	2.29%	3.67%
Native American or Alaska Native (NH)	2	0	0.46%	0.00%
Asian (NH)	3	0	0.69%	0.00%
Pacific Islander or Native Hawaiian (NH)	0	0	0.00%	0.00%
Some other race (NH)	0	0	0.00%	0.00%
Two or more races/Multiracial (NH)	7	21	1.60%	4.54%
Hispanic or Latino (any race)	8	13	1.83%	2.81%
Total	437	463		

As of the 2020 United States census, there were 463 people, 238 households, and 162 families residing in the town.

As of the 2010 United States census, there were 437 people, 203 households, and 163 families residing in the town.

=== 2000 census ===
At the 2000 census, there were 473 people, 181 households and 131 families residing in the town. The population density was 1,127.1 inhabitants per square mile (435.2/km^{2}). There were 196 housing units at an average density of 467.0 units per square mile (180.3 units/km^{2}). The racial makeup of the town was 97.89% White, 0.63% African American, 0.42% Native American, 0.63% Asian, and 0.42% from two or more races. Hispanic or Latino of any race were 1.90% of the population.

In 2000, there were 181 households, of which 45.9% had children under the age of 18 living with them, 54.1% were married couples living together, 16.51% had a female householder with no husband present, and 27.1% were non-families. 24.9% of all households were made up of individuals, and 11.6% had someone living alone who was 65 years of age or older. The average household size was 2.61 and the average family size was 3.2.

In 2000, 30.4% of the population were under the age of 18, 9.9% from 18 to 24, 25.8% from 25 to 44, 23.5% from 45 to 64, and 10.4% who were 65 years of age or older. The median age was 32 years. For every 100 females, there were 90.0 males. For every 100 females age 18 and over, there were 85.9 males.

In 2000, the median household income was $28,906 and the median family income was $29,833. Males had a median income of $23,182 and females $20,625. The per capita income was $12,954. About 14.5% of families and 12.7% of the population were below the poverty line, including 28.7% of those under age 18 and 12.8% of those age 65 or over.

== Education ==
The public schools in the Town of Glen St. Mary are served by the Baker County School District.

- Baker County High School is located on 1 Wildcat Drive in Glen St. Mary.
