= Michael Montgomery =

American football player (born 1983)

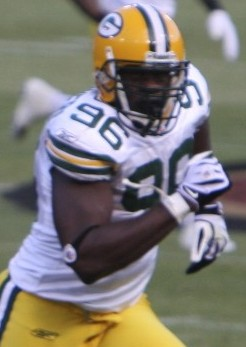
- Montgomery with the Green Bay Packers in 2008

No. 96, 99, 53
- Position: Defensive end

Personal information
- Born: August 18, 1983 (age 43); Carthage, Texas, U.S.
- Listed height: 6 ft 6 in (1.98 m)
- Listed weight: 282 lb (128 kg)

Career information
- High school: Center (Center, Texas)
- College: Texas A&M
- NFL draft: 2005: 6th round, 180th overall pick

Career history
- Green Bay Packers (2005–2009); Minnesota Vikings (2010)*; Green Bay Packers (2010); Las Vegas Locomotives (2011); Montreal Alouettes (2012)
- * Offseason or practice squad member only

Awards and highlights
- First-team JUCO All-American (2002); First-team All-Big 12 (2004)

Career NFL statistics
- Total tackles: 124
- Sacks: 5
- Forced fumbles: 1
- Pass deflections: 2
- Stats at Pro Football Reference

Michael Lewis Montgomery, II (born August 18, 1983) is an American former professional football player who was a defensive end in the National Football League (NFL). He was selected by the Green Bay Packers in the sixth round of the 2005 NFL draft. He played college football for the Texas A&M Aggies.

Montgomery was also a member of the Minnesota Vikings, Las Vegas Locomotives and Montreal Alouettes.

== College career ==
Montgomery was born in Carthage, Texas, and attended Center High School in Center, Texas. He played college football at Navarro Junior College and Texas A&M University. He started his career at Navarro where he played for two years recording 131 tackles and six sacks. Before his junior year he transferred to Texas A&M where he recorded 123 tackles, seven sacks, and one interception, and earned first-team All-Big 12 honors.

== Professional career ==
=== Green Bay Packers (first stint) ===
Montgomery was selected 180th overall by the Green Bay Packers in the sixth round of the 2005 NFL draft. For the first three years of his career he was used mainly as a backup defensive end.

During the 2008 season, after the Packers lost starting defensive end Cullen Jenkins due to injury and released Kabeer Gbaja-Biamila, Montgomery along with rookie Jeremy Thompson split time starting at defensive end. He finished the season starting eight games.

After becoming an unrestricted free agent after 2008, Montgomery re-signed with the Packers on March 23, 2009. During the season, he recorded only two tackles in ten games.

Montgomery was released on March 5, 2010. In five years with the team he started eight of 56 games, recording 123 tackles and five sacks.

=== Minnesota Vikings ===
Montgomery signed with the Minnesota Vikings on March 29, 2010. The Vikings released Montgomery on September 4, 2010, as the team made final cuts to set its 53-man roster.

=== Green Bay Packers (second stint) ===
Montgomery again joined the Packers on October 15, 2010. He was later released on November 2, 2010, after appearing in only two games for Green Bay.

== NFL career statistics ==
Legend
| **Bold** | Career high |

=== Regular season ===
| Year | Team | Games | | Tackles | | | | | Interceptions | | | | | Fumbles | | | |
| Year | Team | GP | GS | Cmb | Solo | Ast | Sck | TFL | Int | Yds | TD | Lng | PD | FF | FR | Yds | TD |
|---|---|---|---|---|---|---|---|---|---|---|---|---|---|---|---|---|---|
| 2005 | GNB | 12 | 0 | 22 | 15 | 7 | 1.0 | 1 | 0 | 0 | 0 | 0 | 0 | 0 | 0 | 0 | 0 |
| 2006 | GNB | 11 | 0 | 18 | 10 | 8 | 1.5 | 0 | 0 | 0 | 0 | 0 | **1** | 0 | 0 | 0 | 0 |
| 2007 | GNB | 9 | 0 | 22 | 17 | 5 | 0.0 | 2 | 0 | 0 | 0 | 0 | 0 | 0 | 0 | 0 | 0 |
| 2008 | GNB | **14** | **8** | **59** | **43** | **16** | **2.5** | **4** | 0 | 0 | 0 | 0 | **1** | **1** | 0 | 0 | 0 |
| 2009 | GNB | 10 | 0 | 3 | 2 | 1 | 0.0 | 1 | 0 | 0 | 0 | 0 | 0 | 0 | 0 | 0 | 0 |
| 2010 | GNB | 2 | 0 | 0 | 0 | 0 | 0.0 | 0 | 0 | 0 | 0 | 0 | 0 | 0 | 0 | 0 | 0 |
| | | 58 | 8 | 124 | 87 | 37 | 5.0 | 8 | 0 | 0 | 0 | 0 | 2 | 1 | 0 | 0 | 0 |

=== Playoffs ===
| Year | Team | Games | | Tackles | | | | | Interceptions | | | | | Fumbles | | | |
| Year | Team | GP | GS | Cmb | Solo | Ast | Sck | TFL | Int | Yds | TD | Lng | PD | FF | FR | Yds | TD |
|---|---|---|---|---|---|---|---|---|---|---|---|---|---|---|---|---|---|
| 2007 | GNB | **2** | 0 | **3** | **2** | **1** | 0.0 | 0 | 0 | 0 | 0 | 0 | 0 | 0 | 0 | 0 | 0 |
| | | 2 | 0 | 3 | 2 | 1 | 0.0 | 0 | 0 | 0 | 0 | 0 | 0 | 0 | 0 | 0 | 0 |
