= 1963 Dallas Cowboys season =

NFL team season

- Owner: Clint Murchison, Jr.
- General manager: Tex Schramm
- Head coach: Tom Landry
- Home stadium: Cotton Bowl

Results
- Record: 4–10
- Division place: 5th NFL Eastern
- Playoffs: Did not qualify

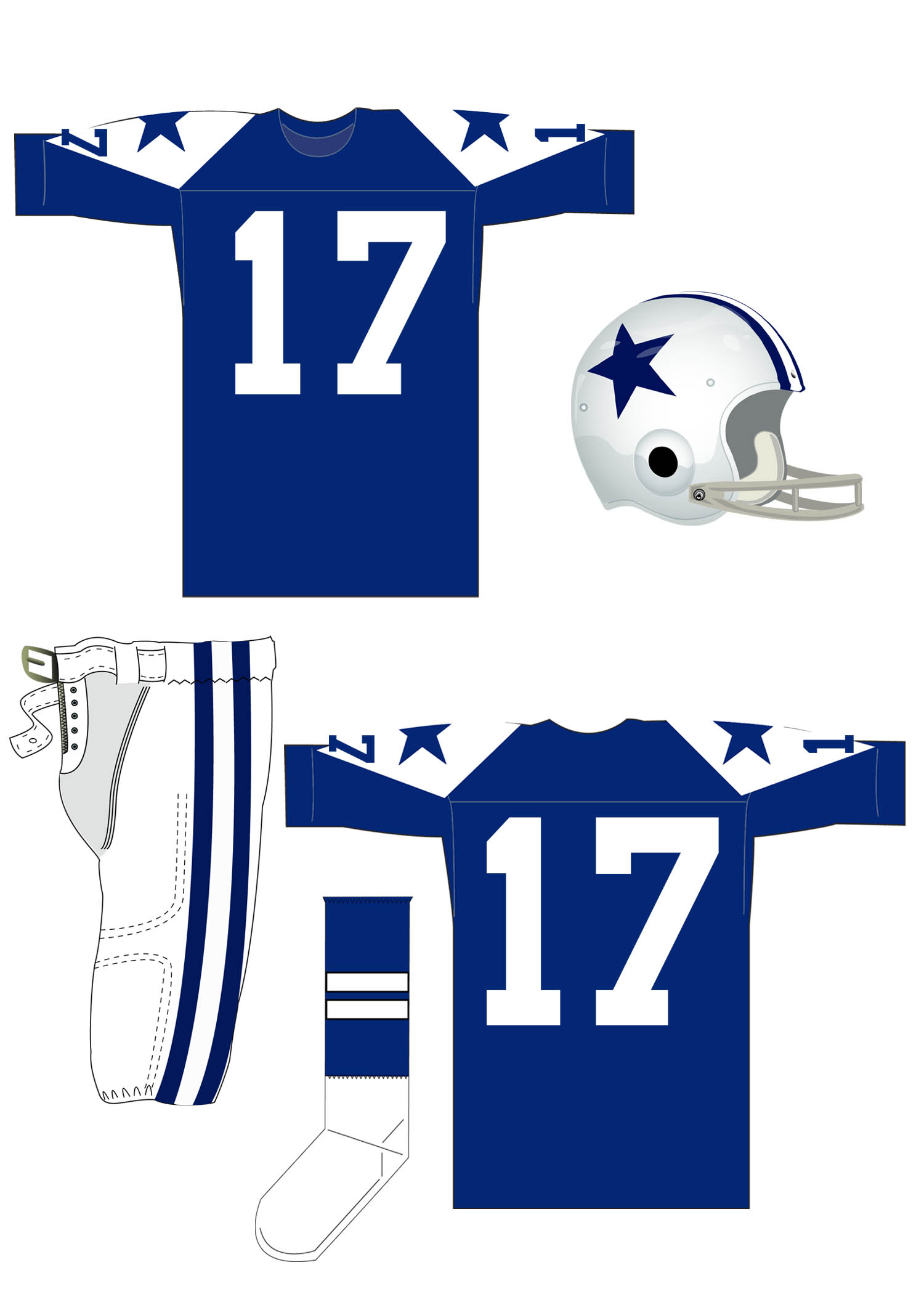
Cowboys blue uniform, 1960

The 1963 Dallas Cowboys season was their fourth in the league, and also the first where the Cowboys were the only professional football team in Dallas, as the AFL's Texans relocated to Kansas City (and were rebranded as the Chiefs) during the offseason.

The team failed to improve on their previous output of 5–8–1, winning only four games. The Cowboys also missed the playoffs for the fourth consecutive season.

== Schedule ==
Week	Date	Opponent	Result	Record	Venue	Attendance	Recap
1	September 14	**St. Louis Cardinals**	**L** 7–34	0–1	Cotton Bowl	36,432	Recap
2	September 22	**Cleveland Browns**	**L** 24–41	0–2	Cotton Bowl	28,710	Recap
3	September 29	at **Washington Redskins**	**L** 17–21	0–3	D.C. Stadium	40,101	Recap
4	October 6	at **Philadelphia Eagles**	**L** 21–24	0–4	Franklin Field	60,671	Recap
5	October 13	Detroit Lions	**W** 17–14	1–4	Cotton Bowl	27,264	Recap
6	October 20	at **New York Giants**	**L** 21–37	1–5	Yankee Stadium	62,889	Recap
7	October 27	at **Pittsburgh Steelers**	**L** 21–27	1–6	Forbes Field	19,047	Recap
8	November 3	**Washington Redskins**	**W** 35–20	2–6	Cotton Bowl	18,838	Recap
9	November 10	at San Francisco 49ers	**L** 24–31	2–7	Kezar Stadium	29,563	Recap
10	November 17	**Philadelphia Eagles**	**W** 27–20	3–7	Cotton Bowl	23,694	Recap
11	November 24	at **Cleveland Browns**	**L** 17–27	3–8	Cleveland Stadium	55,096	Recap
12	December 1	**New York Giants**	**L** 27–34	3–9	Cotton Bowl	29,653	Recap
13	December 8	**Pittsburgh Steelers**	**L** 19–34	3–10	Cotton Bowl	24,136	Recap
14	December 15	at **St. Louis Cardinals**	**W** 28–24	4–10	Busch Stadium	12,695	Recap

Conference opponents are in bold text

== Game summaries ==
=== Week 5 ===
Team	1	2	3	4	Total
Lions	0	0	0	14	14
• Cowboys	0	7	0	10	17

- Date: October 13
- Location: Cotton Bowl, Dallas, Texas
- Game weather: 76 °F (24 °C); wind 8 mph

Scoring summary
Q2	DAL	Clarke 11 yard pass from Meredith (Baker kick)	DAL 7–0
Q4	DAL	Baker 13 yard field goal	DAL 10–0
Q4	DET	Cogdill 30 yard pass from Morrall (Walker kick)	DAL 10–7
Q4	DAL	Marsh 41 yard run (Baker kick)	DAL 17–7
Q4	DET	Cogdill 70 yard pass from Morrall (Walker kick)	DAL 17–14

=== Week 8 ===
Team	1	2	3	4	Total
Redskins	0	10	3	7	20
• Cowboys	7	7	7	14	35

- Date: November 3
- Location: Cotton Bowl, Dallas, Texas
- Game weather: 57 °F (14 °C); wind 16 mph

Scoring summary
Q1	DAL	Folkins 1 yard pass from Meredith (Baker kick)	DAL 7–0
Q2	WSH	Dugan 41 yard pass from Snead (Khayat kick)	Tie 7–7
Q2	WSH	Khayat 12 yard field goal	WSH 10–7
Q2	DAL	Clarke 13 yard pass from Meredith (Baker kick)	DAL 14–10
Q3	WSH	Khayat 49 yard field goal	DAL 14–13
Q3	DAL	Folkins 1 yard pass from Meredith (Baker kick)	DAL 21–13
Q4	WSH	Dugan 19 yard pass from Snead (Khayat kick)	DAL 21–20
Q4	DAL	Stiger 7 yard run (Baker kick)	DAL 28–20
Q4	DAL	Clarke 12 yard pass from Meredith (Baker kick)	DAL 35–20

=== Week 10 ===
Team	1	2	3	4	Total
Eagles	6	0	7	7	20
• Cowboys	7	10	7	3	27

- Date: November 17
- Location: Cotton Bowl
- Game attendance: 23,694
- Game weather: 72 °F (22 °C); wind 18 mph

Scoring summary
Q1	DAL	Norman 1 yard pass from Meredith (Baker kick)	DAL 7–0
Q1	PHI	McDonald 26 yard pass from Hill (kick failed)	DAL 7–6
Q2	DAL	Perkins 2 yard run (Baker kick)	DAL 14–6
Q2	DAL	Baker 33 yard field goal	DAL 17–6
Q3	DAL	Clarke 14 yard pass from Meredith (Baker kick)	DAL 24–6
Q3	PHI	Brown 24 yard pass from Hill (Clark kick)	DAL 24–13
Q4	DAL	Baker 27 yard field goal	DAL 27–13
Q4	PHI	Retzlaff 16 yard pass from Hill (Clark kick)	DAL 27–20

=== Week 14 ===
Team	1	2	3	4	Total
• Cowboys	0	14	0	14	28
Cardinals	0	14	10	0	24

- Date: December 15
- Location: Busch Stadium
- Game weather: 6 °F (−14 °C); wind 11 mph

Scoring summary
Q2	DAL	Meredith 1 yard run (Baker kick)	DAL 7–0
Q2	STL	Randle 62 yard pass from Johnson (Bakken kick)	Tie 7–7
Q2	STL	Triplett 16 yard pass from Johnson (Bakken kick)	STL 14–7
Q2	DAL	Lilly 42 yard fumble return (Baker kick)	Tie 14–14
Q3	STL	Wilson 35 yard run (Bakken kick)	STL 21–14
Q3	STL	Bakken 11 yard field goal	STL 24–14
Q4	DAL	Norman 12 yard pass from Meredith (Baker kick)	STL 24–21
Q4	DAL	Clarke 25 yard pass from Meredith (Baker kick)	DAL 28–24

== Standings ==
NFL Eastern Conference
	W	L	T	PCT	CONF	PF	PA	STK
New York Giants	11	3	0	.786	9–3	448	280	W3
Cleveland Browns	10	4	0	.714	9–3	343	262	W1
St. Louis Cardinals	9	5	0	.643	8–4	341	283	L1
Pittsburgh Steelers	7	4	3	.636	7–3–2	321	295	L1
Dallas Cowboys	4	10	0	.286	3–9	305	378	W1
Washington Redskins	3	11	0	.214	2–10	279	398	L3
Philadelphia Eagles	2	10	2	.167	2–8–2	242	381	L2

Note: Tie games were not officially counted in the standings until 1972.

== Season recap ==
The Cowboys were expecting to turn their fortunes around and have a good year, but won only three of their first ten games.

The assassination of John F. Kennedy on November 22, 1963, stands out as an infamous moment in the season: not only was the nation's psyche impacted by this event, but the image of the city of Dallas was seriously tarnished. On November 24 - just two days after this historic event - the NFL decided to play its normal schedule of games, with the Cowboys traveling to face the Cleveland Browns.

On game day, when the team was introduced, the public address announcer referred to the team as simply the Cowboys, while the crowd also vented their frustration and pain at Cowboys players and officials during the game. The Cowboys lost 17–27, and would go on to have only one more win in the remaining three games.

On September 29, 1963, Billy Howton became the NFL's all-time receiving leader, breaking Don Hutson's record for career receptions and receiving yards. He retired at the end of the year, after playing in 12 seasons with 503 catches, 8,459 yards and 61 touchdowns.

== NFL draft ==
1963 Dallas Cowboys draft
Round	Pick	Player	Position	College	Notes
1	6	Lee Roy Jordan *	LB	Alabama	
3	34	Jim Price	LB	Louisville	
4	48	Whaley Hall	OT	Mississippi	
7	90	Marv Clothier	OG	Kansas	
10	132	Rod Scheyer	OT	Washington	
11	146	Ray Schoenke	OG	SMU	
12	160	Bill Perkins	RB	Iowa	
13	174	Paul Wicker	OT	Fresno State	
14	188	Lou Cioci	LB	Boston College	
15	202	Jerry Overton	S	Utah	
16	216	Dennis Golden	OT	Holy Cross	
17	230	Ernie Parks	OG	McMurry	
18	244	Bill Frank	OT	Colorado	Played in the CFL in 1963
19	258	Jim Stiger	RB	Washington	
20	272	Tommy Lucas	E	Texas	
Made roster † Pro Football Hall of Fame * Made at least one Pro Bowl during career

== Roster ==
Dallas Cowboys 1963 roster
Quarterbacks: 11 Sonny Gibbs; 14 Eddie LeBaron; 17 Don Meredith; Running backs: 22 Amos Bullocks; 33 Wendell Hayes; 31 Amos Marsh; 43 Don Perkins; 40 Jim Stiger; Wide receivers: 80 Gary Barnes; 82 Frank Clarke; 81 Billy Howton; 84 Pettis Norman; Tight ends: 83 Lee Folkins	Offensive linemen: 53 Mike Connelly C; 75 Bob Fry T; 51 Lynn Hoyem G/C; 72 Tony Liscio T; 70 Dale Memmelaar G; 76 Ed Nutting T; 62 Lance Poimboeuf C/G; 65 Ray Schoenke T/G; Defensive linemen: 66 George Andrie DE; 74 Bob Lilly DT/DE; 78 John Meyers DT; 68 Guy Reese DT; 79 Larry Stephens DE	Linebackers: 52 Dave Edwards OLB; 56 Harold Hays MLB/OLB; 54 Chuck Howley OLB; 50 Jerry Tubbs MLB; Defensive backs: 44 Don Bishop CB; 27 Mike Gaechter SS; 34 Cornell Green CB; 41 Warren Livingston FS; 20 Jerry Overton CB; 42 Jimmy Ridlon SS; Special teams: 38 Sam Baker K/P	Reserve lists: 60 Joe Isbell G (IR); 55 Lee Roy Jordan LB (IR); 64 Jim Ray Smith G (IR); 71 Don Talbert T (Military); Rookies in italics 37 active, 4 inactive
