= 1963 Pittsburgh Steelers season =

Steelers 31st US football season

- Owner: Art Rooney
- Head coach: Buddy Parker
- Home stadium: Forbes Field (four games); Pitt Stadium (three games)

Results
- Record: 7–4–3
- Division place: 4th NFL Eastern
- Playoffs: Did not qualify

The 1963 Pittsburgh Steelers season was the team's 31st in the National Football League (NFL). The Steelers won seven games, lost four, and tied three to finish fourth in the Eastern Conference. It was also their final season of splitting home games between Forbes Field and Pitt Stadium before moving all of their home games to the latter for the next six seasons.

In the second game of the season, the Steelers shut out the New York Giants 31–0 in the home opener at Pitt Stadium. The Giants had won the conference title the previous two seasons and four of the last five, but were without hall of fame quarterback Y. A. Tittle.

Because tie games were not included in NFL standings at the time (for winning percentage), the Steelers had a chance to win the conference title and advance to their first-ever NFL Championship Game. They needed to defeat the Giants at Yankee Stadium in the season finale, but lost 33–17 and fell to fourth; it was their last winning season until 1972.

This year marked the debut of the Steelers' trademark black helmets with their logo on one side of the helmet. They had used the logo previously on yellow helmets, but 1963 was the first season in which their now-signature look was used full-time in the regular season.

Prior to the season in May, defensive tackle Big Daddy Lipscomb died of an overdose of heroin at age 31; his final game was the Pro Bowl in January 1963, in which he was named the lineman of the game.

== Roster ==
1963 Pittsburgh Steelers roster
Quarterbacks (QB): 15 Ed Brown P; 14 Bill Nelsen; 12 Terry Nofsinger; Running backs (RB): 42 Dick Hoak; 35 John Henry Johnson; 33 Theron Sapp; Wide receivers (WR): 85 Gary Ballman; 86 John Burrell; 25 Roy Curry; 84 Buddy Dial; 23 Red Mack; Tight ends (TE): 40 Preston Carpenter; 88 John Powers	Offensive linemen (OL): 63 Art Anderson T; 71 Charlie Bradshaw T; 77 Dan James T; 72 Ray Lemek G; 51 Buzz Nutter C; 62 Mike Sandusky G; 68 Ron Stehouwer G; Defensive linemen (DL): 73 Frank Atkinson DT; 78 John Baker DE; 74 Lou Cordileone DT; 75 Joe Krupa DT; 79 Lou Michaels DE/K; 70 Ernie Stautner DE	Linebackers (LB): 66 Myron Pottios MLB; 50 John Reger OLB; 56 Bob Rowley OLB; 36 Andy Russell OLB; 67 Bob Schmitz OLB; Defensive backs (DB): 24 Jim Bradshaw FS; 44 Willie Daniel CB; 43 Glenn Glass CB; 27 Dick Haley SS; 26 Brady Keys CB; 28 Clendon Thomas FS; Special teams (ST)	Rookies in italics

== Regular season ==
=== Schedule ===
Game	Date	Opponent	Result	Record	Venue	Attendance
1	September 15	at Philadelphia Eagles	T 21–21	0–0–1	Franklin Field	58,205
2	September 22	New York Giants	W 31–0	1–0–1	Pitt Stadium	46,068
3	September 29	St. Louis Cardinals	W 23–10	2–0–1	Forbes Field	28,225
4	October 5	at Cleveland Browns	L 23–35	2–1–1	Cleveland Stadium	84,684
5	October 13	at St. Louis Cardinals	L 23–24	2–2–1	Busch Stadium (I)	23,715
6	October 20	Washington Redskins	W 38–27	3–2–1	Pitt Stadium	41,987
7	October 27	Dallas Cowboys	W 27–21	4–2–1	Forbes Field	19,047
8	November 3	at Green Bay Packers	L 14–33	4–3–1	Milwaukee County Stadium	46,293
9	November 10	Cleveland Browns	W 9–7	5–3–1	Pitt Stadium	54,497
10	November 17	at Washington Redskins	W 34–28	6–3–1	D.C. Stadium	49,219
11	November 24	Chicago Bears	T 17–17	6–3–2	Forbes Field	36,465
12	December 1	Philadelphia Eagles	T 20–20	6–3–3	Forbes Field	15,721
13	December 8	at Dallas Cowboys	W 24–19	7–3–3	Cotton Bowl	24,136
14	December 15	at New York Giants	L 17–33	7–4–3	Yankee Stadium (I)	63,240

=== Game summaries ===
==== Week 1 (Sunday September 15, 1963): Philadelphia Eagles ====
	1	2	3	4	Total
Steelers	0	6	0	15	21
Eagles	7	0	7	7	21

at Franklin Field, Philadelphia, Pennsylvania

- Game time:
- Game weather:
- Game attendance: 58,205
- Referee: Bill Downes
- TV announcers:

Scoring Drives:

- Philadelphia – McDonald 13 pass from Jurgensen (Clark kick)
- Pittsburgh – FG Michaels 38
- Pittsburgh – FG Michaels 50
- Philadelphia – Smith 6 pass from Jurgensen (Clark kick)
- Pittsburgh – FG Michaels 17
- Pittsburgh – Johnson 1 run (kick failed)
- Philadelphia – McDonald 75 pass from Jurgensen (Clark kick)
- Pittsburgh – Johnson 11 pass from Brown (kick failed)

==== Week 2 (Sunday September 22, 1963): New York Giants ====
	1	2	3	4	Total
Giants	0	0	0	0	0
Steelers	0	10	0	21	31

at Pitt Stadium, Pittsburgh, Pennsylvania

- Game time:
- Game weather:
- Game attendance: 46,068
- Referee:
- TV announcers:

Scoring Drives:

- Pittsburgh – Hoak 1 run (Michaels kick)
- Pittsburgh – FG Michaels 11
- Pittsburgh – Hoak 2 pass from Brown (Michaels kick)
- Pittsburgh – Johnson 1 run (Michaels kick)
- Pittsburgh – Dial 46 pass from Brown (Michaels kick)

==== Week 3 (Sunday September 29, 1963): St. Louis Cardinals ====
	1	2	3	4	Total
Cardinals	7	0	3	0	10
Steelers	3	3	0	17	23

at Forbes Field, Pittsburgh, Pennsylvania

- Game time:
- Game weather:
- Game attendance: 28,225
- Referee:
- TV announcers:

Scoring Drives:

- St. Louis – Triplett 63 run (Bakken kick)
- Pittsburgh – FG Michaels 21
- Pittsburgh – FG Michaels 40
- St. Louis – FG Bakken 28
- Pittsburgh – Hoak 1 run (Michaels kick)
- Pittsburgh – FG Michaels 21
- Pittsburgh – Ferguson 4 run (Michaels kick)

==== Week 4 (Saturday October 5, 1963): Cleveland Browns ====
	1	2	3	4	Total
Steelers	3	17	3	0	23
Browns	7	7	7	21	42

at Cleveland Municipal Stadium, Cleveland, Ohio

- Game time:
- Game weather:
- Game attendance: 84,684
- Referee:
- TV announcers:

Scoring Drives:

- Pittsburgh – FG Michaels 18
- Cleveland – Brown 8 run (Groza kick)
- Pittsburgh – FG Michaels 8
- Pittsburgh – Dial 24 pass from Brown (Michaels kick)
- Cleveland – Collins 15 pass from Ryan (Groza kick)
- Pittsburgh – Dial 41 pass from Brown (Michaels kick)
- Cleveland – Ryan 13 run (Groza kick)
- Pittsburgh – FG Michaels 8
- Cleveland – Collins 20 pass from Ryan (Groza kick)
- Cleveland – Krietling 19 pass from Ryan (Groza kick)

==== Week 5 (Sunday October 13, 1963): St. Louis Cardinals ====
	1	2	3	4	Total
Steelers	3	17	3	0	23
Cardinals	3	0	7	14	24

at Busch Stadium, St. Louis, Missouri

- Game time:
- Game weather:
- Game attendance: 23,715
- Referee:
- TV announcers:

Scoring Drives:

- St. Louis – FG Bakken 44
- Pittsburgh – FG Michaels 45
- Pittsburgh – Mack 83 pass from Brown (Michaels kick)
- Pittsburgh – FG Michaels 47
- Pittsburgh – Brown 1 run (Michaels kick)

==== Week 6 (Sunday October 20, 1963): Washington Redskins ====
	1	2	3	4	Total
Redskins	3	14	7	3	27
Steelers	7	10	7	14	38

at Pitt Stadium, Pittsburgh, Pennsylvania

- Game time:
- Game weather:
- Game attendance: 41,987
- Referee:
- TV announcers:
- Pittsburgh – Brown 1 run (Michaels kick)
- Washington – FG Khayat 49
- Pittsburgh – Hoak 8 run (Michaels kick)
- Pittsburgh – FG Michaels 9
- Washington – Snead 1 run (Khayat kick)
- Washington – James 36 pass from Snead (Khayat kick)
- Washington – James 5 run (Khayat kick)
- Pittsburgh – Hoak 1 run (Michaels kick)
- Washington – FG Khayat 15
- Pittsburgh – Haley 24 interception return (Michaels kick)
- Pittsburgh – Dial 4 pass from Brown (Michaels kick)

==== Week 7 (Sunday October 27, 1963): Dallas Cowboys ====
	1	2	3	4	Total
Cowboys	7	7	7	0	21
Steelers	0	6	7	14	27

at Forbes Field, Pittsburgh, Pennsylvania

- Game time:
- Game weather:
- Game attendance: 19,047
- Referee:
- TV announcers:

Scoring Drives:

- Dallas – Clarke 5 pass from Meredith (Baker kick)
- Dallas – Folkins 35 pass from Meredith (Baker kick)
- Pittsburgh – Dial 83 pass from Browns (kick failed)
- Dallas – Howton 13 pass from Meredith (Baker kick)
- Pittsburgh – Dial 25 pass from Brown (Tracy kick)
- Pittsburgh – Dial 14 pass from Brown (Tracy kick)
- Pittsburgh – Mack 85 pass from Brown (Michaels kick)

==== Week 8 (Sunday November 3, 1963): Green Bay Packers ====
	1	2	3	4	Total
Steelers	7	0	0	7	14
Packers	3	6	14	10	33

at Milwaukee County Stadium, Milwaukee, Wisconsin

- Game time:
- Game weather:
- Game attendance:
- Referee:
- TV announcers:

Scoring Drives:

- Pittsburgh – Hoak 2 run (Michaels kick)
- Green Bay – FG Kramer 23
- Green Bay – FG Kramer 36
- Green Bay – FG Kramer 12
- Green Bay – Taylor 1 run (Kramer kick)
- Green Bay – Pitts 2 run (Kramer kick)
- Green Bay – FG Kramer 37
- Pittsburgh – Mack 33 pass from Brown (Michaels kick)
- Green Bay – Pitts 1 run (Kramer kick)

==== Week 9 (Sunday November 10, 1963): Cleveland Browns ====
	1	2	3	4	Total
Browns	0	7	0	0	7
Steelers	0	0	2	7	9

at Pitt Stadium, Pittsburgh, Pennsylvania

- Game time:
- Game weather:
- Game attendance: 54,497
- Referee:
- TV announcers:

Scoring Drives:

- Cleveland – Collins 4 pass from Ryan (Groza kick)
- Pittsburgh – Safety, Brown tackled by Schmitz in end zone
- Pittsburgh – Ballman 9 pass from Brown (Michaels kick)

==== Week 10 (Sunday November 17, 1963): Washington Redskins ====
	1	2	3	4	Total
Steelers	7	7	10	10	34
Redskins	7	7	0	14	28

at D.C. Stadium, Washington, DC

- Game time:
- Game weather:
- Game attendance: 42,219
- Referee:
- TV announcers:

Scoring Drives:

- Washington – Crabb 53 interception return (Khayat kick)
- Pittsburgh – Johnson 3 run (Michaels kick)
- Washington – Mitchell 19 pass from Snead (Khayat kick)
- Pittsburgh – Ballman 67 pass from Brown (Khayat kick)
- Pittsburgh – Johnson 1 run (Michaels kick)
- Pittsburgh – FG Michaels 27
- Washington – Mitchell 20 pass from Barnes (Khayat kick)
- Pittsburgh – FG Michaels 18
- Washington – Richter 21 pass from Snead (Khayat kick)
- Pittsburgh – Ballman 92 kickoff return (Michaels kick)

==== Week 11 (Sunday November 24, 1963): Chicago Bears ====
	1	2	3	4	Total
Bears	7	7	0	3	17
Steelers	0	14	0	3	17

at Forbes Field, Pittsburgh, Pennsylvania

- Game time:
- Game weather:
- Game attendance: 36,465
- Referee:
- TV announcers:

Scoring Drives:

- Chicago – Galimore 1 run (Jencks kick)
- Pittsburgh – Hoak 6 run (Michaels kick)
- Chicago – Bull 1 run (Jencks kick)
- Pittsburgh – Curry 31 pass from Brown (Michaels kick)
- Pittsburgh – FG Michaels 11
- Chicago – FG Leclerc 18

==== Week 12 (Sunday December 1, 1963): Philadelphia Eagles ====
	1	2	3	4	Total
Eagles	0	14	3	3	20
Steelers	0	3	0	17	20

at Forbes Field, Pittsburgh, Pennsylvania

- Game time:
- Game weather:
- Game attendance: 15,721
- Referee:
- TV announcers:

Scoring Drives:

- Pittsburgh – FG Michaels 10
- Philadelphia – Retzlaff 24 pass from Hill (Clark kick)
- Philadelphia – Brown 14 run (Clark kick)
- Philadelphia – FG Clark 23
- Pittsburgh – Ballman 57 pass from Brown (Michaels kick)
- Philadelphia – FG Clark 40
- Pittsburgh – Ballman 8 pass from Brown (Michaels kick)
- Pittsburgh – FG Michaels 24

==== Week 13 (Sunday December 8, 1963): Dallas Cowboys ====
	1	2	3	4	Total
Steelers	0	17	0	7	24
Cowboys	9	0	10	0	19

at Cotton Bowl, Dallas, Texas

- Game time:
- Game weather:
- Game attendance: 24,136
- Referee:
- TV announcers:

Scoring Drives:

- Dallas – FG Baker 53
- Dallas – Meredith 2 run (kick failed)
- Pittsburgh – Dial 55 pass from Brown (Michaels kick)
- Pittsburgh – Carpenter 28 pass from Brown (Michaels kick)
- Pittsburgh – FG Michaels 24
- Dallas – FG Baker 46
- Dallas – Meredith 4 run (Baker kick)
- Pittsburgh – Sapp 24 run (Michaels kick)

==== Week 14 (December 15, 1963): New York Giants ====
	1	2	3	4	Total
Steelers	0	3	14	0	17
Giants	9	7	14	3	33

at Yankee Stadium, The Bronx, New York

- Game time:
- Game weather:
- Game attendance: 63,240
- Referee:
- TV announcers:

Scoring Drives:

- New York Giants – FG Chandler 34
- New York Giants – Shotner 41 pass from Tittle (kick failed)
- New York Giants – Morrison 3 pass from Tittle (Chandler kick)
- Pittsburgh – FG Michaels 27
- Pittsburgh – Ballman 21 pass from Brown (Michaels kick)
- New York Giants – Morrison 22 pass from Tittle (Chandler kick)
- New York Giants – Morrison 1 run (Chandler kick)
- Pittsburgh – Dial 40 pass from Brown (Michaels kick)
- New York Giants – FG Chandler 41

== Standings ==
NFL Eastern Conference
	W	L	T	PCT	CONF	PF	PA	STK
New York Giants	11	3	0	.786	9–3	448	280	W3
Cleveland Browns	10	4	0	.714	9–3	343	262	W1
St. Louis Cardinals	9	5	0	.643	8–4	341	283	L1
Pittsburgh Steelers	7	4	3	.636	7–3–2	321	295	L1
Dallas Cowboys	4	10	0	.286	3–9	305	378	W1
Washington Redskins	3	11	0	.214	2–10	279	398	L3
Philadelphia Eagles	2	10	2	.167	2–8–2	242	381	L2

Note: Tie games were not officially counted in the standings until 1972.
