= Del Shofner =

American football player (1934–2020)

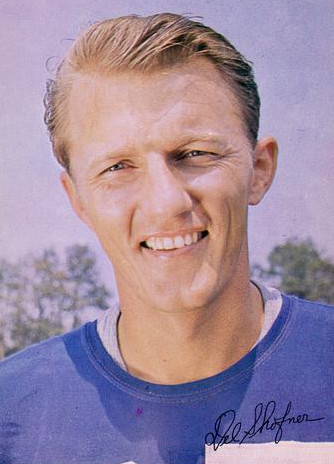
- Shofner in 1965

No. 29, 85
- Positions: End, flanker

Personal information
- Born: December 11, 1934; Center, Texas, U.S.
- Died: March 11, 2020 (aged 85); Los Angeles, California, U.S.
- Listed height: 6 ft 3 in (1.91 m)
- Listed weight: 186 lb (84 kg)

Career information
- High school: Center
- College: Baylor
- NFL draft: 1957: 1st round, 11th overall pick

Career history
- Los Angeles Rams (1957–1960); New York Giants (1961–1967)

Awards and highlights
- 5× First-team All-Pro (1958, 1959, 1961–1963); 5× Pro Bowl (1958, 1959, 1961–1963); NFL receiving yards leader (1958); NFL 1960s All-Decade Team; 23rd greatest New York Giant of all-time; 2× Second-team All-SWC (1954, 1956)

Career NFL statistics
- Receptions: 349
- Receiving yards: 6,470
- Receiving touchdowns: 51
- Stats at Pro Football Reference

Delbert Martin Shofner (December 11, 1934 – March 11, 2020) was an American professional football player who was an end and flanker for 11 seasons with the Los Angeles Rams and the New York Giants of the National Football League (NFL) from 1957 to 1967. He played college football for the Baylor Bears.

== Early life ==
Shofner played college football at Baylor University. In addition to football, Shofner played basketball, baseball, and was a sprinter while at Baylor.

Shofner helped lead the Baylor Bears to a 13–7 victory over Tennessee in the 1957 Sugar Bowl and was voted the game's Most Valuable Player.

== Career ==
Shofner began his career in 1957 as a defensive back. He played in 12 games (starting 10) and intercepted two passes while recovering a fumble. He got his chance to play for the offense as a split end in the next season and he made it count. Playing in twelve games, he caught 51 passes for 1,097 yards for eight touchdowns. He led the league in yards and yards per game (91.4) while making his first Pro Bowl and being named 1st Team All-Pro. He continued further the next year, catching 47 passes for 936 yards (second most in the league) for seven touchdowns for another Pro Bowl and All-Pro selection. He had a down year in 1960 (having suffered a leg injury and ulcers), the fourth and final season spent with the Rams. He played in eleven games while catching 12 passes for 122 yards for a touchdown. He also spent his four years with the Rams as their punter, punting 153 total times for 6,420 yards (with two blocked).

On August 28, 1961, he was traded to the New York Giants for draft picks. He was acquired by owner Wellington Mara because of how much his new quarterback Y.A. Tittle (acquired ten days earlier) raved about the receiver. The result proved positive for both New York and Shofner. He caught 69 passes for 1,125 yards (second most in the NFL) for 11 touchdowns while returning to Pro Bowl and All-Pro form. He was the first Giant to have a 1,000-yard season, and he would soon become the first to do so in consecutive seasons. Teammates (such as future Hall of Famer Sam Huff) soon called him "Slim" and "Blade"; in his subsequent memoir Tough Stuff, Huff described Shofner as “Lean and mean out on that field, great speed and better moves, with legs strong enough to break tackles and leap into the air.”

The Giants, led by Tittle and coach Allie Sherman, roared all the way to the NFL Championship Game. However, facing the Green Bay Packers at New City Stadium, the Giants were shut-out 37–0. Shofner caught three passes for 41 yards in the loss. He continued his consistency the next year, catching 53 passes for 1,133 yards for 12 touchdowns (second most in the league). Shofner holds the record for most receiving yards by a Giant in a game, having caught eleven passes for 269 yards on October 28, 1962, against the Washington Redskins (this was also the game where Tittle threw for seven touchdown passes, with Shofner catching one of them). The Giants made it back to the NFL Championship Game again that year, this time playing the Packers in New York. Shofner caught five passes for 69 yards, but the Giants were trounced once again 16–7. The next year was his last great one. He caught 64 passes for 1,181 yards (second most in the league) while having nine touchdowns while being named to his fifth and final Pro Bowl and All-Pro selection. Once again, the Giants rolled to the NFL Championship Game. Playing the Chicago Bears at Wrigley Field. Shofner had no statline as the Giants lost 14–10. He was the first receiver with four 1,000-yard seasons, and no receiver would match him until 1965.

Injuries and illness caused a decline in his effectiveness in 1964, and thereafter and he eventually was supplanted as the starting split end in the middle of the 1965 season. In his last four seasons (1964–1967), he played in just 37 games while catching 54 total passes for 876 yards and three touchdowns. He retired after the 1967 NFL season.

== Legacy ==
In 2005, he was named to the Professional Football Researchers Association Hall of Very Good in the association's third HOVG class.

Despite being named to the All-Decade team of the 1960s, Shofner has not been elected to the Pro Football Hall of Fame, nor has he been a finalist in recent years.

== Personal life ==
Shofner lived most of his life in San Marino, California, after retiring from football. After his playing career, he became a businessman, selling animal feed ingredients. He had three children with his wife Carol along with five grandchildren.

Shofner lived there for over 50 years before moving later to Bradbury, California. He died in Los Angeles on March 11, 2020, at the age of 85.

== NFL career statistics ==
Legend
	Led the league
**Bold**	Career high

=== Regular season ===
Year	Team	Games		Receiving				
Year	Team	GP	GS	Rec	Yds	Avg	Lng	TD
1957	RAM	12	10	–	–	–	–	–
1958	RAM	12	11	51	1,097	**21.5**	**92**	8
1959	RAM	12	12	47	936	19.9	72	7
1960	RAM	11	9	12	122	10.2	17	1
1961	NYG	**14**	**14**	**68**	1,125	16.5	46	11
1962	NYG	13	12	53	1,133	21.4	69	**12**
1963	NYG	**14**	**14**	64	**1,181**	18.5	70	9
1964	NYG	6	6	22	323	14.7	54	0
1965	NYG	12	10	22	388	17.6	49	2
1966	NYG	9	2	3	19	6.3	9	0
1967	NYG	10	4	7	146	20.9	33	1
Career		125	104	349	6,470	18.5	92	51
