= Ed Brown (quarterback) =

American football player (1928–2007)

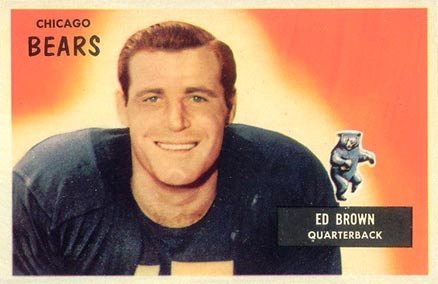
- 1955 Bowman football card

No. 15, 14
- Positions: Quarterback, punter

Personal information
- Born: October 26, 1928; San Luis Obispo, California, U.S.
- Died: August 2, 2007 (aged 78); Kennewick, Washington, U.S.
- Listed height: 6 ft 2 in (1.88 m)
- Listed weight: 200 lb (91 kg)

Career information
- High school: San Luis Obispo
- College: Hartnell (1948); San Francisco (1949-1951)
- NFL draft: 1952: 6th round, 68th overall pick

Career history
- Chicago Bears (1954–1961); Pittsburgh Steelers (1962–1965); Baltimore Colts (1965)

Awards and highlights
- 2× Pro Bowl (1955, 1956); UPI Comeback Player of the Year (1963); NFL passer rating leader (1956); NFL completion percentage leader (1956); Top 100 Bears players of all time; Second-team All-PCC (1951)

Career NFL statistics
- Passing attempts: 1,987
- Passing completions: 949
- Completion percentage: 47.8%
- TD–INT: 102–138
- Passing yards: 15,600
- Passer rating: 62.8
- Stats at Pro Football Reference

Charles Edward Brown (October 26, 1928 – August 2, 2007) was an American professional football player who was a quarterback and punter in the National Football League (NFL).

== Prior to the NFL ==
Brown went to high school in San Luis Obispo, California, and Hartnell College in Salinas, California. He played for the University of San Francisco Dons through 1951. On his senior year (1951), he quarterbacked the Dons to an undefeated 9–0 season, but the team did not receive a bowl invitation.

Despite the increasing integration of college and pro football, the major bowls that year did not select teams that had black players, or they asked the teams to not bring their black players. The Dons refused to send a white-only squad, so they were snubbed. The 1951 Dons featured Ollie Matson and Burl Toler, both superb players who happened to be African-American. Matson played with great success in the NFL and was inducted into the Pro Football Hall of Fame in 1972; Toler became the first black official in the NFL.

The 1951 Dons are sometimes considered the greatest collection of players ever on one college team. Besides Matson, Toler, and Brown, the Dons had Gino Marchetti, Bob St. Clair, Dick Stanfel, and five other players who made the NFL. In addition, head coach Joe Kuharich went on to coach in the NFL, and their athletic news director (publicist) was Pete Rozelle, future NFL commissioner. Despite their great success—or maybe it was because of it—USF discontinued its football program after the 1951 season due to the high cost of running a top-notch football team.

== NFL career ==
=== Chicago Bears years ===
Brown was selected by George Halas' Chicago Bears in the sixth round of the 1952 NFL draft (68th overall). He was drafted by the U.S. Marine Corps and spent two years in service. He played for the Camp Pendleton football squad.

Brown began playing in the NFL in 1954 as the third-string quarterback for the Bears, behind George Blanda and Zeke Bratkowski. In 1955, with Bratkowski in the military, Brown beat out Blanda for the starting job and led the Bears to an 8–4 record and a very close second-place finish to the Los Angeles Rams. Brown developed a reputation as a longball-throwing, shot-and-a-beer quarterback, connecting often with Harlon Hill, who led the league with nine touchdown receptions. Brown had his finest season in 1956, playing for new Bears head coach Paddy Driscoll (Halas was still owner and GM and would soon return as coach). Brown led the league that year in passing, completing 96 of 168 passes for 1,667 yards, 11 touchdowns and 12 interceptions. He had an amazing 9.9 yards per attempt. Hill remained his favorite target, catching 47 passes for 1,128 yards (a 24.0 yard per catch average), and 11 touchdowns. The Bears won the Western Conference with a 9-2-1 record, leading the league in rushing and scoring while finished second in rushing in rushing defense.

The Bears met the New York Giants in the 1956 Championship Game on December 30 at Yankee Stadium. The 1956 game was the second "sneakers" game in Bears-Giants history (the first was in 1934), with the Giants again gaining an advantage by switching to sneakers versus cleats on an icy field. The Giants destroyed the Bears 47–7, intercepting Brown twice, sacking him multiple times for -34 yards and shutting down Rick Casares and the Bears' running attack. The Bears completed 20 of 47 passes for 247 yards and no touchdowns. It got so bad that the Bears abandoned the T-formation and switched to a single-wing variant in the third quarter.

In 1957, the Bears appeared to still be affected by the 1956 title game, slumping to 5–7 with an anemic running attack and a mediocre year by Ed Brown. All of Brown's numbers were down from the previous season. Zeke Bratkowski got back from military service and began to challenge Brown for the quarterback job. In 1958, George Halas took back the coaching job and pushed the Bears back into second place at 8–4, one game behind the Baltimore Colts. Brown played better, throwing for 1,418 yards and 10 touchdowns. Brown had another productive season in 1959, when the Bears again finished second behind Baltimore with an 8–4 record. He passed for a career-high 1,881 yards and 13 touchdowns. By 1960, Brown began to decline on the field while his many late nights did not sit well with Halas, so Bratkowski got more and more playing time. Brown completed only 40% of his passes that year as the Bears finished in fifth. In 1961, Brown was benched in favor of newly acquired Billy Wade. Throughout his years with the Bears (except 1961), Brown was their starting punter, leading the league in punts attempted in 1959 with 64.

=== With the Steelers ===
Before the 1962 season, Brown was traded to the Pittsburgh Steelers, with whom he remained a back-up, now to future Hall of Famer Bobby Layne. Brown got another chance to start when Layne retired after the season. In 1963, still specializing in the long passes, he had his biggest numbers, completing 168 of 362 passes for 2,982 yards, 21 touchdowns, and 20 interceptions. To the surprise of many, the Steelers stayed in contention for the East title until the final game of the season, in which Brown played poorly in a 33–17 loss to the Giants in New York. As legend has it, several teammates feared the team was in trouble when they didn't see their quarterback out and about on the night before the game.

In 1964, Brown played his last year as a starter, throwing for 1,990 yards for the mediocre Steelers team. He played one more season as a backup, was waived and picked up by Baltimore late in the season. Brown played in the season finale behind running back Tom Matte who was filling in at quarterback after injuries to both Johnny Unitas and Gary Cuozzo. Brown completed 3-of-5 passes, including an 81-yard touchdown. Because of his arrival so late in the season, he was ineligible for the Colts' playoff loss to the eventual champion Green Bay. Brown retired after the season.

Brown finished with 949 completions, 1,987 attempts, 15,600 yards, 102 touchdown passes, and 138 interceptions. He rushed for 960 yards and 14 touchdowns during his career. Brown also punted each year for the Steelers except his last. Brown finished with 498 punts and a 40.5 yard average per kick.

== NFL career statistics ==
Legend
	NFL record
	Led the league
**Bold**	Career high

=== Regular season ===
Year	Team	Games			Passing										Punting					Fum
Year	Team	GP	GS	Record	Cmp	Att	Pct	Yds	Y/A	Y/C	Lng	TD	Int	Rtg	Pnt	Yds	Y/P	Lng	Blck	Fum
1954	CHI	12	0	—	10	17	58.8	283	**16.6**	**28.3**	69	3	1	118.3	18	684	38.0	60	0	0
1955	CHI	12	12	8–4	85	164	51.8	1,307	8.0	15.4	86	9	10	71.4	44	1,766	40.1	59	1	4
1956	CHI	12	12	**9–2–1**	96	168	57.1	1,667	9.9	17.4	70	11	12	83.1	42	1,644	39.1	53	1	3
1957	CHI	12	8	3–5	84	185	45.4	1,321	7.1	15.7	74	6	16	44.4	34	1,365	40.1	62	1	5
1958	CHI	12	10	7–3	102	218	46.8	1,418	6.5	13.9	79	10	17	51.0	27	1,140	42.2	57	0	4
1959	CHI	12	8	5–3	125	247	50.6	1,881	7.6	15.0	88	13	10	76.7	**64**	**2,634**	41.2	66	0	**7**
1960	CHI	12	11	4–6–1	59	149	39.6	1,079	7.2	18.3	**91**	7	11	50.2	56	2,231	39.8	65	**2**	2
1961	CHI	**14**	5	3–2	46	98	46.9	742	7.6	16.1	84	4	11	46.8	58	2,448	42.2	69	0	1
1962	PIT	**14**	3	2–1	43	84	51.2	726	8.6	16.9	50	5	6	70.8	60	2,400	40.0	**78**	0	1
1963	PIT	**14**	**14**	7–4–3	**168**	**362**	46.4	**2,982**	8.2	17.8	85	**21**	**20**	71.4	57	2,256	39.6	57	0	5
1964	PIT	**14**	13	5–8	121	272	44.5	1,990	7.3	16.4	54	12	19	55.2	31	1,346	**43.4**	54	0	5
1965	PIT	13	0	—	7	18	38.9	123	6.8	17.6	39	0	5	23.4	0	0	—	0	0	2
1965	BAL	1	0	—	3	5	**60.0**	81	16.2	27.0	68	1	0	**143.7**	2	80	40.0	49	0	1
Career		154	96	53–38–5	949	1,987	47.8	15,600	7.9	16.4	91	102	138	62.8	493	19,994	40.6	78	5	40

=== Postseason ===
Year	Team	Games			Passing									Punting				Fum
Year	Team	GP	GS	Record	Cmp	Att	Pct	Yds	Y/A	Y/C	TD	Int	Rtg	Pnt	Yds	Y/P	Blck	Fum
1956	CHI	1	0	0–1	8	20	40.0	97	4.9	12.1	0	1	34.8	6	255	42.5	1	1
Career		1	0	0–1	8	20	40.0	97	4.9	12.1	0	1	34.8	6	255	42.5	1	1

== Death ==
Brown died on August 2, 2007, in Kennewick, Washington of prostate cancer.
