= Africa, Texas =

Ghost town in Texas, US

Africa is a freedmen's ghost town in Shelby County, Texas, United States. It was settled as a farming community, after the American Civil War, between 1875 and 1900, by former African American slaves. The town declined from the 1950s, and its schoolhouse was consolidated by the Center Independent School District. It was abandoned by 1983.
