= 1963 Washington Redskins season =

NFL team season

- Owner: George Preston Marshall
- General manager: Bill McPeak
- Head coach: Bill McPeak
- Home stadium: D.C. Stadium

Results
- Record: 3–11
- Division place: 6th NFL Eastern
- Playoffs: Did not qualify

The 1963 Washington Redskins season was the franchise's 32nd season in the National Football League (NFL) and their 27th in Washington, D.C. The team tried to improve on their 5–7–2 record from 1962 but failed and finished 3–11.

== Offseason ==
=== NFL draft ===
Round	Pick	Player	Position	School/Club team

== Preseason ==
Week	Date	Opponent	Result	Record	Venue	Attendance
1	August 15	Chicago Bears	L 26–28	0–1	D.C. Stadium	35,420
2	August 24	vs. Philadelphia Eagles	L 13–41	0–2	American Legion Memorial Stadium (Charlotte, NC)	21,500
3	August 31	vs. Baltimore Colts	L 21–27	0–3	Foreman Field (Norfolk, VA)	22,000
4	September 7	vs. Green Bay Packers	L 17–28	0–4	Kingston Stadium (Cedar Rapids, IA)	13,500

== Regular season ==
=== Schedule ===
Game	Date	Opponent	Result	Record	Venue	Attendance	Recap	Sources
1	September 15	at **Cleveland Browns**	**L** 14–37	0–1	Cleveland Municipal Stadium	57,618	Recap	
2	September 21	at Los Angeles Rams	**W** 37–14	1–1	L.A. Memorial Coliseum	29,295	Recap	
3	September 29	**Dallas Cowboys**	**W** 21–17	2–1	D.C. Stadium	40,101	Recap	
4	October 6	**New York Giants**	**L** 14–24	2–2	D.C. Stadium	49,419	Recap	
5	October 13	**Philadelphia Eagles**	**L** 24–37	2–3	D.C. Stadium	49,219	Recap	
6	October 20	at **Pittsburgh Steelers**	**L** 27–38	2–4	Pitt Stadium	41,987	Recap	
7	October 27	**St. Louis Cardinals**	**L** 7–21	2–5	D.C. Stadium	46,921	Recap	
8	November 3	at **Dallas Cowboys**	**L** 20–35	2–6	Cotton Bowl	18,838	Recap	
9	November 10	at **St. Louis Cardinals**	**L** 20–24	2–7	Busch Stadium	18,197	Recap	
10	November 17	**Pittsburgh Steelers**	**L** 28–34	2–8	D.C. Stadium	49,219	Recap	
11	November 24	at **Philadelphia Eagles**	**W** 13–10	3–8	Franklin Field	60,671	Recap	
12	December 1	Baltimore Colts	**L** 20–36	3–9	D.C. Stadium	44,006	Recap	
13	December 8	at **New York Giants**	**L** 14–44	3–10	Yankee Stadium	62,992	Recap	
14	December 15	**Cleveland Browns**	**L** 20–27	3–11	D.C. Stadium	40,865	Recap	
Note: Intra-conference opponents are in **bold** text.

== Standings ==
Program for the December 1 game against the Baltimore Colts.

NFL Eastern Conference
	W	L	T	PCT	CONF	PF	PA	STK
New York Giants	11	3	0	.786	9–3	448	280	W3
Cleveland Browns	10	4	0	.714	9–3	343	262	W1
St. Louis Cardinals	9	5	0	.643	8–4	341	283	L1
Pittsburgh Steelers	7	4	3	.636	7–3–2	321	295	L1
Dallas Cowboys	4	10	0	.286	3–9	305	378	W1
Washington Redskins	3	11	0	.214	2–10	279	398	L3
Philadelphia Eagles	2	10	2	.167	2–8–2	242	381	L2

Note: Tie games were not officially counted in the standings until 1972.

1963 Washington Redskins team photo

== Roster ==
1963 Washington Redskins roster
Quarterbacks (QB): 15 George Izo; 16 Norm Snead; Running backs (RB): 32 Billy Ray Barnes; 31 Don Bosseler; 30 Jim Cunningham; 39 Dave Francis; 47 Dick James SS; 36 Tom Tracy; Wide receivers (WR): 42 Bill Anderson; 20 Frank Budd; 87 Fred Dugan; 49 Bobby Mitchell; Tight ends (TE): 89 Jim Collier; 88 Pat Richter P	Offensive linemen (OL): 67 Andy Cvercko G; 50 Fred Hageman C; 73 Riley Mattson T; 62 John Nisby G; 61 Fran O'Brien T; 65 Vince Promuto G; Defensive linemen (DL): 75 Ben Davidson DT/DE/T; 86 John Paluck DE; 72 Joe Rutgens DT; 78 Ron Snidow DE; 71 Andy Stynchula DE; 79 Bob Toneff DT	Linebackers (LB): 63 Rod Breedlove OLB; 52 Harry Butsko OLB; 66 Carl Kammerer OLB; 51 Gorden Kelley OLB; 55 Allen Miller MLB; 53 Bob Pellegrini MLB; Defensive backs (DB): 23 Claude Crabb CB; 46 Dale Hackbart FS; 40 Lonnie Sanders CB; 41 Jim Steffen SS; Special teams (ST): 60 Robert Khayat K/T	Reserve: 85 Gene Cronin OLB/DE (IR); 68 Wiley Feagin G (IR); 28 Ted Rzempoluch S (IR); 24 Johnny Sample CB (IR); Rookies in italics
