= 1963 New York Giants season =

NFL team season

- Owner: Jack Mara; Wellington Mara
- Head coach: Allie Sherman
- Home stadium: Yankee Stadium

Results
- Record: 11–3
- Division place: 1st NFL Eastern
- Playoffs: Lost NFL Championship (at Bears) 10–14

The 1963 New York Giants season was the franchise's 39th season in the National Football League. The Giants won their third consecutive NFL Eastern Conference title with an 11–3 record, their sixth in eight years, but again lost the NFL championship game. This loss was to the Chicago Bears, 14–10 at Wrigley Field, in the Giants' final post-season appearance until 1981.

Hall of fame quarterback Y. A. Tittle produced one of the greatest passing seasons in NFL history. Tittle had had a breakout season the previous year, but according to Cold Hard Football Facts, "[h]e was even better in 1963, breaking his own record set the year before with 36 TD passes while also leading the league in completion percentage, yards per attempt and passer rating. Tittle's G-Men scored a league-leading (32.0 points-per-game) and competed in a title game with the Bears, who had the league's best defense in 1963 (10.3 points-per-game)."

== Offseason ==
A familiar figure on the offensive line, four-time Pro Bowl selection Wietecha, retired after a decade of service, and Greg Larson took over his job at center. Other new faces included third-string quarterback Glynn Griffing (who would spend just a single season in the NFL), linebacker Jerry Hillebrand, and offensive tackles Lane Howell and Lou Kirouac. Hugh McElhenny put on a Giants uniform for the first time in 1963 after 11 years as a star fullback with the San Francisco 49ers and Minnesota Vikings. McElhenny stayed with the Giants for one season, and of the 12 new players on the Giants' roster in 1963, only Hillebrand and John Lo Vetere spent more than two seasons with the team.

The Giants were facing competition as the New York Titans, the laughingstock of the American Football League, were bought in March by a group headed by Sonny Werblin, who changed the team name to the New York Jets. Though still in the archaic Polo Grounds in 1963, they moved into the new Shea Stadium in 1964 and gained quarterback Joe Namath in January 1965.

== Roster ==
1963 New York Giants roster
Quarterbacks (QB): 15 Glynn Griffing; 14 Y. A. Tittle; Running backs (RB): 37 Charlie Killett; 24 Phil King; 39 Hugh McElhenny; 40 Joe Morrison; 29 Alex Webster; Wide receivers (WR): 16 Frank Gifford; 23 Louis Guy; 85 Del Shofner; Tight ends (TE): 88 Aaron Thomas; 80 Joe Walton	Offensive linemen (OL): 63 Bookie Bolin G; 79 Rosey Brown T; 60 Ken Byers G; 62 Darrell Dess G; 78 Lane Howell T; 71 Lou Kirouac T; 53 Greg Larson C; 66 Jack Stroud T; 65 Mickey Walker G; Defensive linemen (DL): 75 Jim Katcavage DE; 76 John LoVetere DT; 77 Dick Modzelewski DT; 81 Andy Robustelli DE; 65 Robert Taylor DE	Linebackers (LB): 33 Al Gursky OLB; 87 Jerry Hillebrand OLB; 70 Sam Huff MLB; 82 Tom Scott OLB; Defensive backs (DB): 49 Erich Barnes CB; 48 Eddie Dove SS; 22 Dick Lynch CB; 20 Jimmy Patton FS; 25 Dick Pesonen S/CB; 21 Allan Webb SS; Special teams (ST): 34 Don Chandler K/P	Practice squad: 41 Bob Anderson RB; 46 Johnny Counts RB; 45 Homer Jones WR; -- Bill Pashe CB; 51 Lou Slaby LB; Reserve: -- Roger Reynolds WR (Military); -- Dick Skelly RB (IR); 31 Bill Winter LB (IR); Rookies in italics

== Regular season ==
For Y. A. Tittle, 1963 was his finest season. The New York offense was flooded with capable receivers. Del Shofner, Frank Gifford, Alex Webster, Joe Morrison, Joe Walton, and Thomas were joined by the newly acquired McElhenny, who had already caught many passes from Tittle when both played for the San Francisco 49ers. Complementing the offense was Don Chandler, whose accurate place-kicking enabled him to become the league's leading scorer in 1963.

Although Tittle threw three touchdown passes for a 37–28 victory in the season opener against the Baltimore Colts, his ribs were injured in the third quarter, and he was forced to spend the rest of the game, and the entire next game as well, on the sideline. Reserve quarterbacks Gugliemi and Griffing were of little help in game 2 at Pitt Stadium, a 31–0 shutout by the Pittsburgh Steelers. Tittle recovered in time for the third game of the season.

In victories over the Philadelphia Eagles and Washington Redskins, Tittle threw a total of five touchdown passes. On defense, Dick Lynch intercepted three Sonny Jurgensen passes in the defeat of the Eagles.

Since their move to Yankee Stadium in 1956, the Giants' home openers were perennially delayed by the stadium's prime tenant, the New York Yankees. The home opener in 1963 was the fifth game of the season, against the Cleveland Browns. Fullback Jim Brown and the undefeated Browns kept their perfect record intact and increased its Eastern Conference lead over the Giants to two games with a 35–24 victory.

During the next five games, Tittle shifted the Giants' offense into overdrive, averaging 39.6 points per game. Among the victories was a 33–6 defeat of the Browns in the face of 84,000 stunned Cleveland spectators. Before a frustrated Jim Brown was ejected late in the fourth quarter for fighting with a New York defender, he had been held to 40 yards rushing.

In the final nine games in the regular season, the Giants lost only once, a 24–17 to the St. Louis Cardinals at Yankee Stadium, two days after the assassination of President Kennedy. (Commissioner Pete Rozelle received broad criticism from many quarters allowing the regular schedule to proceed on that Sunday, for it had been set aside as a national day of mourning. The AFL postponed its four games.) New York closed out the season with big wins over the Dallas Cowboys, Redskins, and Steelers, and the Giants captured their third consecutive Eastern Conference crown on the final Sunday of the season to finish 11–3, a game ahead of the Browns.

Throughout the autumn of 1963, the air above Giants football games virtually hummed with forward passes. The team amassed 3,558 total passing yards, 47 shy of the Baltimore Colts, who were led by Johnny Unitas. Tittle led the NFL with 36 touchdown tosses, breaking his one-year old single-season record of 33. But New York's passing game was to be severely tested by the league's acknowledged defensive leader: the Chicago Bears.

=== Schedule ===
Game	Date	Opponent	Result	Record	Venue	Attendance	Recap	Sources
1	September 15	at Baltimore Colts	**W** 37–28	1–0	Memorial Stadium	60,029	Recap	
2	September 22	at **Pittsburgh Steelers**	**L** 0–31	1–1	Pitt Stadium	46,068	Recap	
3	September 29	at **Philadelphia Eagles**	**W** 37–14	2–1	Franklin Field	60,671	Recap	
4	October 6	at **Washington Redskins**	**W** 24–14	3–1	D.C. Stadium	49,419	Recap	
5	October 13	**Cleveland Browns**	**L** 24–35	3–2	Yankee Stadium	62,956	Recap	
6	October 20	**Dallas Cowboys**	**W** 37–21	4–2	Yankee Stadium	62,889	Recap	
7	October 27	at **Cleveland Browns**	**W** 33–6	5–2	Cleveland Municipal Stadium	84,213	Recap	
8	November 3	at **St. Louis Cardinals**	**W** 38–21	6–2	Busch Stadium	29,482	Recap	
9	November 10	**Philadelphia Eagles**	**W** 42–14	7–2	Yankee Stadium	62,936	Recap	
10	November 17	San Francisco 49ers	**W** 48–14	8–2	Yankee Stadium	62,982	Recap	
11	November 24	**St. Louis Cardinals**	**L** 17–24	8–3	Yankee Stadium	62,992	Recap	
12	December 1	at **Dallas Cowboys**	**W** 34–27	9–3	Cotton Bowl	29,653	Recap	
13	December 8	**Washington Redskins**	**W** 44–14	10–3	Yankee Stadium	62,992	Recap	
14	December 15	**Pittsburgh Steelers**	**W** 33–17	11–3	Yankee Stadium	63,240	Recap	
Note: Intra-conference opponents are in **bold** text.

=== Game summaries ===
==== Week 1: Baltimore Colts ====
Quarter	1	2	3	4	Total
**Giants**	3	21	13	0	**37**
Colts	14	14	0	0	**28**

at Memorial Stadium, Baltimore, Maryland

- Date: Sunday, September 15
- Game weather: 54 °F (12 °C); wind 11 mph (18 km/h)
- Box Score

Game information

1st Quarter

- BAL: Gino Marchetti 33-yard fumble return (Jim Martin kick)
- BAL: Jimmy Orr 34-yard pass from Johnny Unitas (Jim Martin kick)
- NYG: Don Chandler 42-yard field goal

2nd Quarter

- BAL: John Mackey 32-yard pass from Johnny Unitas (Jim Martin kick)
- NYG: Phil King 46-yard pass from Y. A. Tittle (Don Chandler kick)
- NYG: Joe Walton 4-yard pass from Y. A. Tittle (Don Chandler kick)
- BAL: Jerry Hill 3-yard rush (Jim Martin kick)
- NYG: Hugh McElhenny 7-yard pass from Y. A. Tittle (Don Chandler kick)

3rd Quarter

- NYG: Y. A. Tittle 9-yard rush (kick failed)
- NYG: Alex Webster 1-yard rush (Don Chandler kick)

4th Quarter

- No Scoring

Passing

- NYG: Y. A. Tittle 16/23, 243 yards
- BAL: Johnny Unitas 19/33, 219 yards, 2 INT

Rushing

- NYG: Alex Webster 15–60, Phil King 12–26, Y. A. Tittle 5–24, Hugh McElhenny 3–6, Ralph Guglielmi 2–3
- BAL: J.W. Lockett 9–37, Tom Matte 10–26, Johnny Unitas 4–25

Receiving

- NYG: Phil King 5–101, Del Shofner 5–85, Hugh McElhenny 3–24, Joe Walton 2–17, Alex Webster 1–16
- BAL: Jimmy Orr 5–83, John Mackey 2–46, Tom Matte 4–37, Raymond Berry 4–33, J.W. Lockett 4–20

==== Week 3: Philadelphia Eagles ====
Team	1	2	3	4	Total
• Giants	0	14	16	7	37
Eagles	0	0	7	7	14

- Date: September 29
- Location: Franklin Field, Philadelphia, Pennsylvania
- Game weather: 64 °F (18 °C); wind 12 mph (19 km/h)

Scoring summary
Q2	NYG	Walton 43 yard pass from Tittle (Chandler kick)	NYG 7–0
Q2	NYG	Shofner 10 yard pass from Tittle (Chandler kick)	NYG 14–0
Q3	NYG	Morrison 8 yard pass from Tittle (kick failed)	NYG 20–0
Q3	NYG	Chandler 12 yard field goal	NYG 23–0
Q3	NYG	Morrison 1 yard run (Chandler kick)	NYG 30–0
Q3	PHI	Retzlaff 11 yard pass from Brown (Clark kick)	NYG 30–7
Q4	PHI	McDonald 18 yard pass from Brown (Clark kick)	NYG 30–14
Q4	NYG	Morrison 70 yard run (Chandler kick)	NYG 37–14

- Joe Morrison 12 Rush, 120 Yds

==== Week 13: Washington Redskins ====
Team	1	2	3	4	Total
Redskins	7	0	0	7	14
• Giants	3	20	14	7	44

- Date: December 8
- Location: Yankee Stadium, Bronx, NY
- Game attendance: 62,992
- Game weather: 44 °F (7 °C); wind 12 mph (19 km/h)

Scoring summary
Q1	WSH	Tracy 4 yard run (Khayat kick)	WSH 7–0
Q1	NYG	Chandler 48 yard field goal	WSH 7–3
Q2	NYG	Lynch 42 yard interception return (Chandler kick)	NYG 10–7
Q2	NYG	Gifford 8 yard pass from Tittle (Chandler kick)	NYG 17–7
Q2	NYG	Katcavage 10 yard fumble return (kick failed)	NYG 23–7
Q3	NYG	Morrison 57 yard pass from Tittle (Chandler kick)	NYG 30–7
Q3	NYG	Huff 36 yard interception return (Chandler kick)	NYG 37–7
Q4	NYG	Gifford 28 yard pass from Griffing (Chandler kick)	NYG 44–7
Q4	WSH	Mitchell 56 yard pass from Izo (Khayat kick)	NYG 44–14

==== Week 14: Pittsburgh Steelers ====
Due to NFL rules at the time which did not count tied games in a team's won-loss percentage, the 7-3-3 Steelers entered The Bronx with a chance to win the Eastern championship if they defeated the 10-3 Giants (a tie would have given New York the title). Such a confusing scenario was avoided, thanks to the Giants building a 16-0 lead early in the second quarter. Tittle completed 17 of 26 passes for 308 yards and three touchdowns, two to Joe Morrison and the other to Del Shofner, who caught three passes for 110 yards.

=== Standings ===
NFL Eastern Conference
	W	L	T	PCT	CONF	PF	PA	STK
New York Giants	11	3	0	.786	9–3	448	280	W3
Cleveland Browns	10	4	0	.714	9–3	343	262	W1
St. Louis Cardinals	9	5	0	.643	8–4	341	283	L1
Pittsburgh Steelers	7	4	3	.636	7–3–2	321	295	L1
Dallas Cowboys	4	10	0	.286	3–9	305	378	W1
Washington Redskins	3	11	0	.214	2–10	279	398	L3
Philadelphia Eagles	2	10	2	.167	2–8–2	242	381	L2

Note: Tie games were not officially counted in the standings until 1972.

NFL Western Conference
	W	L	T	PCT	CONF	PF	PA	STK
Chicago Bears	11	1	2	.917	10–1–1	301	144	W2
Green Bay Packers	11	2	1	.846	9–2–1	369	206	W2
Baltimore Colts	8	6	0	.571	7–5	316	285	W3
Detroit Lions	5	8	1	.385	4–7–1	326	265	L1
Minnesota Vikings	5	8	1	.385	4–7–1	309	390	W1
Los Angeles Rams	5	9	0	.357	5–7	210	350	L2
San Francisco 49ers	2	12	0	.143	1–11	198	391	L5

Note: Tie games were not officially counted in the standings until 1972.

== Postseason ==
Round	Date	Opponent	Result	Venue	Attendance	Recap	Sources
Championship	December 29	at Chicago Bears	L 10–14	Wrigley Field	45,801	Recap	

Playoff Game Officials

- Referee: (#56) Norm Schachter
- Umpire: (#15) Ralph Morcroft
- Head Linesman: (#36) Dan Tehan
- Back Judge: (#47) Ralph Vandenberg
- Field Judge: (#21) Fred Swearingen
- Alternates: Art McNally, Herman Rohrig, Jack Nix

== Awards and honors ==
- Y. A. Tittle, NFL MVP
- Y. A. Tittle, Franchise Record, Most Touchdown Passes in One Season, 36 Touchdown Passes
