= Lance Poimboeuf =

American football player (1940–2018)

No. 62
- Position: Guard

Personal information
- Born: November 10, 1940; Franklin, Louisiana
- Died: May 18, 2018 (aged 77); Thibodaux, Louisiana
- Listed height: 6 ft 3 in (1.91 m)
- Listed weight: 225 lb (102 kg)

Career information
- High school: Franklin (LA)
- College: Louisiana–Lafayette
- NFL draft: 1963: undrafted

Career history
- Dallas Cowboys (1963)
- Stats at Pro Football Reference

Lance Joseph Poimboeuf (November 10, 1940 – May 18, 2018) was an American football offensive guard in the National Football League for the Dallas Cowboys. He played college football at the University of Louisiana at Lafayette.

== Early life ==
Poimboeuf attended Franklin High School. He walked-on at the University of Louisiana at Lafayette. He played for head coaches Jim "Red" Hoggatt in 1960 and for Russ Faulkinberry in 1961 and 1962.

He was a two-way tackle and a placekicker. He kicked a 55-yard field goal as a senior. He received the Cambre Award for the top non-scholarship athlete.

== Professional career ==
Poimboeuf was signed as an undrafted free agent by the Dallas Cowboys after the 1963 NFL draft. As a rookie, he was tried at guard, punter and also competed with Sam Baker for the placekicker job.

In the 1964 training camp, he was used mostly at placekicker, before being released on August 16.

== Personal life ==
Poimboeuf was the football head coach at Edward Douglas White Catholic High School, winning the state championship in 1968 and 1969. He later moved on to Nicholls State University, where he was an associate professor, the Department Head of Health and Physical Education and Faculty Representative to the NCAA. He also was President of the Southland Athletic Conference. He died on May 18, 2018.
