= Red Mack =

American football player (1937–2021)

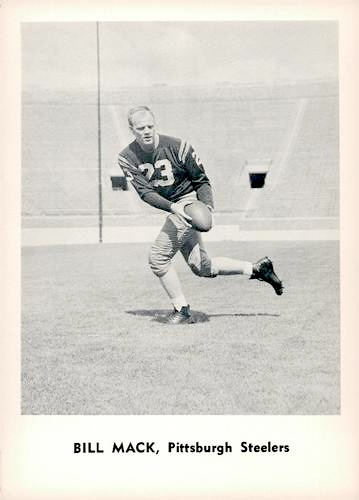
- Mack in 1961

No. 23, 25, 27
- Positions: Tight end, wide receiver, halfback

Personal information
- Born: June 19, 1937; Oconto, Wisconsin, U.S.
- Died: April 8, 2021 (aged 83); South Bend, Indiana, U.S.
- Listed height: 5 ft 10 in (1.78 m)
- Listed weight: 180 lb (82 kg)

Career information
- High school: Hampton (Allison Park, Pennsylvania)
- College: Notre Dame (1957–1960)
- NFL draft: 1961: 10th round, 131st overall pick
- AFL draft: 1961: 23rd round, 180th overall pick

Career history
- Pittsburgh Steelers (1961–1963); Philadelphia Eagles (1964); Pittsburgh Steelers (1965); Atlanta Falcons (1966); Green Bay Packers (1966)

Awards and highlights
- Super Bowl champion (I); NFL champion (1966)

Career NFL statistics
- Receptions: 52
- Receiving yards: 1,159
- Touchdowns: 8
- Stats at Pro Football Reference

William Richard "Red" Mack (June 19, 1937 – April 8, 2021) was an American football wide receiver and halfback in the National Football League (NFL) for the Pittsburgh Steelers, the Philadelphia Eagles, the Atlanta Falcons, and the Green Bay Packers. As a Green Bay Packer he played in Super Bowl I, January 15, 1967, and made two tackles. He attended Hampton High School in Allison Park, Pennsylvania just outside of Pittsburgh, where he was a star at football. He would go on to play college football at the University of Notre Dame.

Mack was drafted by the Pittsburgh Steelers in the tenth round (131st overall) of the 1961 NFL draft. He was also drafted by the Buffalo Bills in the 23rd round (179th overall) of 1961 American Football League draft. He joined the Green Bay Packers in 1966 but was dropped from the team in 1967.

Mack's best NFL season came in 1963, when he caught 25 passes for 618 yards as a Steeler.

After football, Mack worked for Bendix Corporation for 35 years, living in South Bend, Indiana, a mile from Notre Dame Stadium.

== Health and death ==
Mack had two knee replacements and two hip replacements, a shoulder replaced.

He died at his home in South Bend, Indiana, on April 8, 2021.
