= Charlie Bradshaw (offensive tackle) =

American football player (1936–2002)

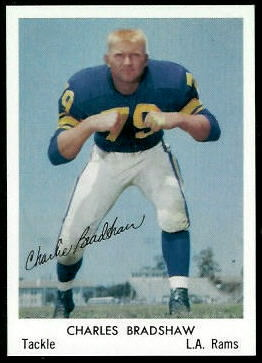
- Bradshaw with the Rams in 1959

No. 79, 71
- Position: Offensive tackle

Personal information
- Born: March 13, 1936; Waco, Texas, U.S.
- Died: January 23, 2002 (aged 65); Plano, Texas, U.S.
- Listed height: 6 ft 6 in (1.98 m)
- Listed weight: 255 lb (116 kg)

Career information
- High school: Center (Center, Texas)
- College: Baylor
- NFL draft: 1957: 8th round, 94th overall pick

Career history
- Los Angeles Rams (1958–1960); Pittsburgh Steelers (1961–1966); Detroit Lions (1967–1968)

Awards and highlights
- 2× Pro Bowl (1963-1964); Pittsburgh Steelers Legends team

Career NFL statistics
- Games played: 145
- Games started: 131
- Fumble recoveries: 10
- Stats at Pro Football Reference

Charles Marvin Bradshaw (March 13, 1936 – January 23, 2002) was an American professional football player who was an offensive tackle for 11 seasons in the National Football League (NFL), primarily with the Pittsburgh Steelers. He served for a time as the head of the NFL Players Association. Bradshaw earned a law degree during the offseason and after his career practiced law in Dallas, Texas until the time of his death from cancer.

Bradshaw played college football for the Baylor Bears. As a Pittsburgh Steeler, he became one of the most notorious linemen of the day, drawing such tremendous booing from the home crowd that club owner Art Rooney discontinued pregame introductions of players at Pitt Stadium.
