= 1963 St. Louis Cardinals (NFL) season =

American football team season

1963 St. Louis Cardinals season
- Head coach: Wally Lemm
- Home stadium: Busch Stadium (I)

Results
- Record: 9–5
- Division place: 3rd NFL Eastern
- Playoffs: Did not qualify

The 1963 St. Louis Cardinals season was the 44th year for the team was in the National Football League (NFL) and their fourth in St. Louis. The team improved on their previous output of 4–9–1, winning nine games. Despite the improvement, they failed to qualify for the playoffs for the 15th consecutive season.

== Schedule ==
| Week | Date | Opponent | Result | Record | Venue | Attendance |
|---|---|---|---|---|---|---|
| 1 | September 14 | at **Dallas Cowboys** | **W** 34–7 | 1–0 | Cotton Bowl | 36,432 |
| 2 | September 22 | at **Philadelphia Eagles** | **W** 28–24 | 2–0 | Franklin Field | 60,671 |
| 3 | September 29 | at **Pittsburgh Steelers** | **L** 10–23 | 2–1 | Forbes Field | 28,225 |
| 4 | October 6 | at Minnesota Vikings | **W** 56–14 | 3–1 | Metropolitan Stadium | 30,220 |
| 5 | October 13 | **Pittsburgh Steelers** | **W** 24–23 | 4–1 | Busch Stadium | 23,715 |
| 6 | October 20 | Green Bay Packers | **L** 7–30 | 4–2 | Busch Stadium | 32,224 |
| 7 | October 27 | at **Washington Redskins** | **W** 21–7 | 5–2 | D.C. Stadium | 46,921 |
| 8 | November 3 | **New York Giants** | **L** 21–38 | 5–3 | Busch Stadium | 29,482 |
| 9 | November 10 | **Washington Redskins** | **W** 24–17 | 6–3 | Busch Stadium | 18,197 |
| 10 | November 17 | at **Cleveland Browns** | **W** 20–14 | 7–3 | Cleveland Municipal Stadium | 75,232 |
| 11 | November 24 | at **New York Giants** | **W** 24–17 | 8–3 | Yankee Stadium | 62,992 |
| 12 | December 1 | **Cleveland Browns** | **L** 10–24 | 8–4 | Busch Stadium | 32,531 |
| 13 | December 8 | **Philadelphia Eagles** | **W** 38–14 | 9–4 | Busch Stadium | 15,979 |
| 14 | December 15 | **Dallas Cowboys** | **L** 24–28 | 9–5 | Busch Stadium | 12,695 |
Note: Intra-conference opponents are in **bold** text.

== Standings ==
NFL Eastern Conference
| | W | L | T | PCT | CONF | PF | PA | STK |
|---|---|---|---|---|---|---|---|---|
| New York Giants | 11 | 3 | 0 | .786 | 9–3 | 448 | 280 | W3 |
| Cleveland Browns | 10 | 4 | 0 | .714 | 9–3 | 343 | 262 | W1 |
| St. Louis Cardinals | 9 | 5 | 0 | .643 | 8–4 | 341 | 283 | L1 |
| Pittsburgh Steelers | 7 | 4 | 3 | .636 | 7–3–2 | 321 | 295 | L1 |
| Dallas Cowboys | 4 | 10 | 0 | .286 | 3–9 | 305 | 378 | W1 |
| Washington Redskins | 3 | 11 | 0 | .214 | 2–10 | 279 | 398 | L3 |
| Philadelphia Eagles | 2 | 10 | 2 | .167 | 2–8–2 | 242 | 381 | L2 |

Note: Tie games were not officially counted in the standings until 1972.

== Personnel ==
=== Staff / Coaches ===
1963 St. Louis Cardinals staff
| Front office: Principal Owner/de facto General Manager - Bill Bidwill; Partial Owner / Team President - Charles Bidwill Jr.; Head coaches: Head Coach – Wally Lemm; Offensive coaches: Offensive Backs / Game Scouting - Charley Trippi; Offensive Backs - Don Shroyer; Backfield Assistant - Skip Stahley; Offensive Line – Ray Prochaska; Receivers Coach – Fran Polsfoot | Defensive coaches: Defensive Coordinator - Chuck Drulis; Defensive Line Coach - Ed Henke |

=== Roster ===
1963 St. Louis Cardinals roster
| Quarterbacks (QB): 11 Buddy Humphrey; 12 Charley Johnson; Running backs (RB): 35 Joe Childress; 33 Mal Hammack; 23 Bob Paremore; 36 Bill Thornton; 38 Bill Triplett; Wide receivers (WR): 40 Bobby Joe Conrad; 3 Billy Gambrell; 88 Sonny Randle; Tight ends (TE): 81 Jackie Smith | Offensive linemen (OL): 75 Ed Cook G; 61 Bob DeMarco C; 55 Irv Goode T; 64 Ken Gray G; 66 John Houser G; 73 Ernie McMillan T; 71 Bob Reynolds T; Defensive linemen (DL): 86 Don Brumm DE; 80 Ed Henke DE; 70 Don Owens DT; 78 Luke Owens DT; 84 Joe Robb DE; 72 Sam Silas DT | Linebackers (LB): 50 Garland Boyette MLB; 34 Bill Koman OLB; 60 Dave Meggyesy OLB; 62 Dale Meinert MLB; 52 Marion Rushing OLB; 67 Larry Stallings OLB; Defensive backs (DB): 49 Jimmy Burson CB; 37 Pat Fischer CB; 24 Billy Stacy CB; 21 Jerry Stovall SS/P; 31 John Symank FS/SS; 8 Larry Wilson FS; Special teams (ST): 25 Jim Bakken K | Practice squad: 20 Monk Bailey CB/S; Reserve: 85 Taz Anderson TE (IR); 44 John David Crow RB (IR); 22 Prentice Gautt RB (IR); 41 Jimmy Hill CB (IR); 65 Tom Redmond DE/DT (IR); -- John Wittenborn G (IR); Rookies in italics |
