= McNeil Moore =

American football player (1933–2023)

No. 29
- Position: Defensive back

Personal information
- Born: June 26, 1933; Center, Texas, U.S.
- Died: March 9, 2023 (aged 89); Longview, Texas, U.S.
- Listed height: 6 ft 0 in (1.83 m)
- Listed weight: 185 lb (84 kg)

Career information
- High school: Center
- College: Rice; Sam Houston State
- NFL draft: 1954: 18th round, 210th overall pick

Career history
- Chicago Bears (1954–1957)

Career NFL statistics
- Games played: 35
- Interceptions: 8
- Stats at Pro Football Reference

Ernest McNeil Moore (June 26, 1933 – March 9, 2023) was an American professional football player who played for Chicago Bears of the National Football League (NFL). He played college football at Sam Houston State University and Rice University. Moore died in Longview, Texas on March 9, 2023, at the age of 89.
