= 1963 Cleveland Browns season =

NFL team season

- General manager: Harold Sauerbrei
- Head coach: Blanton Collier
- Home stadium: Cleveland Stadium

Results
- Record: 10–4
- Division place: 2nd NFL Eastern
- Playoffs: Lost NFL Playoff Bowl (vs. Packers) 23–40
- Pro Bowlers: Bernie Parrish, CB; John Morrow, C Galen Fiss, LB; Bill Glass, DE; Dick Schafrath, LT; Jim Brown, FB

The 1963 Cleveland Browns season was the team's 14th season with the National Football League.

Hall of Fame running back Jim Brown led the league in rushing for the sixth time in seven seasons. This was the year that Brown became the NFL's all-time leading rusher, surpassing Joe Perry. As a team, the 1963 Browns gained an NFL-record 5.74 yards per carry.

The Browns would not start 4–0 at home again until 2026.

== Exhibition schedule ==
Game	Date	Opponent	Result	Venue	Attendance	Sources
1	August 10	at Detroit Lions	L 10–24		37,248	
2	August 17	Baltimore Colts	L 7–21		83,218	
3	August 25	at San Francisco 49ers	W 24–7		28,335	
4	August 31	at Los Angeles Rams	W 23–17		45,623	
5	September 8	vs. Pittsburgh Steelers	L 7–16	Canton	18,462	

There was a doubleheader on August 17, 1963 Giants vs Lions and Colts vs Browns.

== Schedule ==
Game	Date	Opponent	Result	Record	Venue	Attendance	Recap	Sources
1	September 15	**Washington Redskins**	**W** 37–14	1–0	Cleveland Stadium	57,618	Recap	
2	September 22	at **Dallas Cowboys**	**W** 41–24	2–0	Cotton Bowl	28,710	Recap	
3	September 29	Los Angeles Rams	**W** 20–6	3–0	Cleveland Stadium	54,713	Recap	
4	October 5	**Pittsburgh Steelers**	**W** 35–23	4–0	Cleveland Stadium	84,684	Recap	
5	October 13	at **New York Giants**	**W** 35–24	5–0	Yankee Stadium	62,956	Recap	
6	October 20	**Philadelphia Eagles**	**W** 37–7	6–0	Cleveland Stadium	75,174	Recap	
7	October 27	**New York Giants**	**L** 6–33	6–1	Cleveland Stadium	84,213	Recap	
8	November 3	at **Philadelphia Eagles**	**W** 23–17	7–1	Franklin Field	60,671	Recap	
9	November 10	at **Pittsburgh Steelers**	**L** 7–9	7–2	Pitt Stadium	54,497	Recap	
10	November 17	**St. Louis Cardinals**	**L** 14–20	7–3	Cleveland Stadium	75,932	Recap	
11	November 24	**Dallas Cowboys**	**W** 27–17	8–3	Cleveland Stadium	55,096	Recap	
12	December 1	at **St. Louis Cardinals**	**W** 24–10	9–3	Busch Stadium	32,531	Recap	
13	December 8	at Detroit Lions	**L** 10–38	9–4	Tiger Stadium	51,382	Recap	
14	December 15	at **Washington Redskins**	**W** 27–20	10–4	D.C. Stadium	40,865	Recap	
Note: Intra-conference opponents are in **bold** text.

== Playoffs ==
Round	Date	Opponent	Result	Record	Venue	Attendance	Sources
Playoff Bowl	January 5, 1964	Green Bay Packers	L 23–40	0–1	Miami Orange Bowl	54,921	

== Standings ==
NFL Eastern Conference
	W	L	T	PCT	CONF	PF	PA	STK
New York Giants	11	3	0	.786	9–3	448	280	W3
Cleveland Browns	10	4	0	.714	9–3	343	262	W1
St. Louis Cardinals	9	5	0	.643	8–4	341	283	L1
Pittsburgh Steelers	7	4	3	.636	7–3–2	321	295	L1
Dallas Cowboys	4	10	0	.286	3–9	305	378	W1
Washington Redskins	3	11	0	.214	2–10	279	398	L3
Philadelphia Eagles	2	10	2	.167	2–8–2	242	381	L2

Note: Tie games were not officially counted in the standings until 1972.

NFL Western Conference
	W	L	T	PCT	CONF	PF	PA	STK
Chicago Bears	11	1	2	.917	10–1–1	301	144	W2
Green Bay Packers	11	2	1	.846	9–2–1	369	206	W2
Baltimore Colts	8	6	0	.571	7–5	316	285	W3
Detroit Lions	5	8	1	.385	4–7–1	326	265	L1
Minnesota Vikings	5	8	1	.385	4–7–1	309	390	W1
Los Angeles Rams	5	9	0	.357	5–7	210	350	L2
San Francisco 49ers	2	12	0	.143	1–11	198	391	L5

Note: Tie games were not officially counted in the standings until 1972.

== Personnel ==
=== Roster ===
1963 Cleveland Browns roster
Quarterbacks: 13 Frank Ryan; 15 Jim Ninowski; Running backs: 32 Jim Brown; 34 Ken Webb; 36 Charley Scales; 48 Ernie Green; Wide receivers: 26 Ray Renfro; 86 Gary Collins P; 87 Tom Hutchinson; 88 Rich Kreitling; Tight ends: 42 Bobby Crespino; 83 Johnny Brewer	Offensive linemen: 53 Frank Morze C; 56 John Morrow C; 60 John Wooten G; 64 Ted Connolly G; 66 Gene Hickerson G; 70 John Brown T; 73 Monte Clark T; 75 Jim McCusker T; 75 Roger Shoals T; 77 Dick Schafrath T; Defensive linemen: 69 Jim Kanicki DT; 78 Frank Parker DT; 79 Bob Gain DT; 80 Bill Glass DE; 84 Paul Wiggin DE	Linebackers: 35 Galen Fiss OLB; 38 Stan Sczurek MLB; 50 Vince Costello MLB; 52 Mike Lucci OLB; 54 Sam Tidmore MLB; 62 Tom Goosby OLB; 82 Jim Houston OLB; Defensive backs: 20 Ross Fichtner FS; 23 Larry Benz SS; 24 Bobby Franklin CB; 30 Bernie Parrish CB; 40 Jim Shorter FS; 44 Jim Shofner CB; 49 Walter Beach CB; Special teams: 76 Lou Groza K; rookies in italics

=== Staff ===
1963 Cleveland Browns staff
Front office: Owner/CEO - Art Modell; General manager – Harold Sauerbrei; Coaches: Head coach – Blanton Collier; Offensive coaches: Offensive line – Fritz Heisler; Offensive backfield and ends – Dub Jones	Defensive coaches: Defensive coordinator – Howard Brinker; Defensive line – Dick Evans; Linebackers – Ed Ulinski; Strength & Conditioning: Athletic Trainer - Leo Murphy; Equipment Manager - Morris Kono

== Awards and honors ==
- Jim Brown, Bert Bell Award
