= Center, Texas =

- City
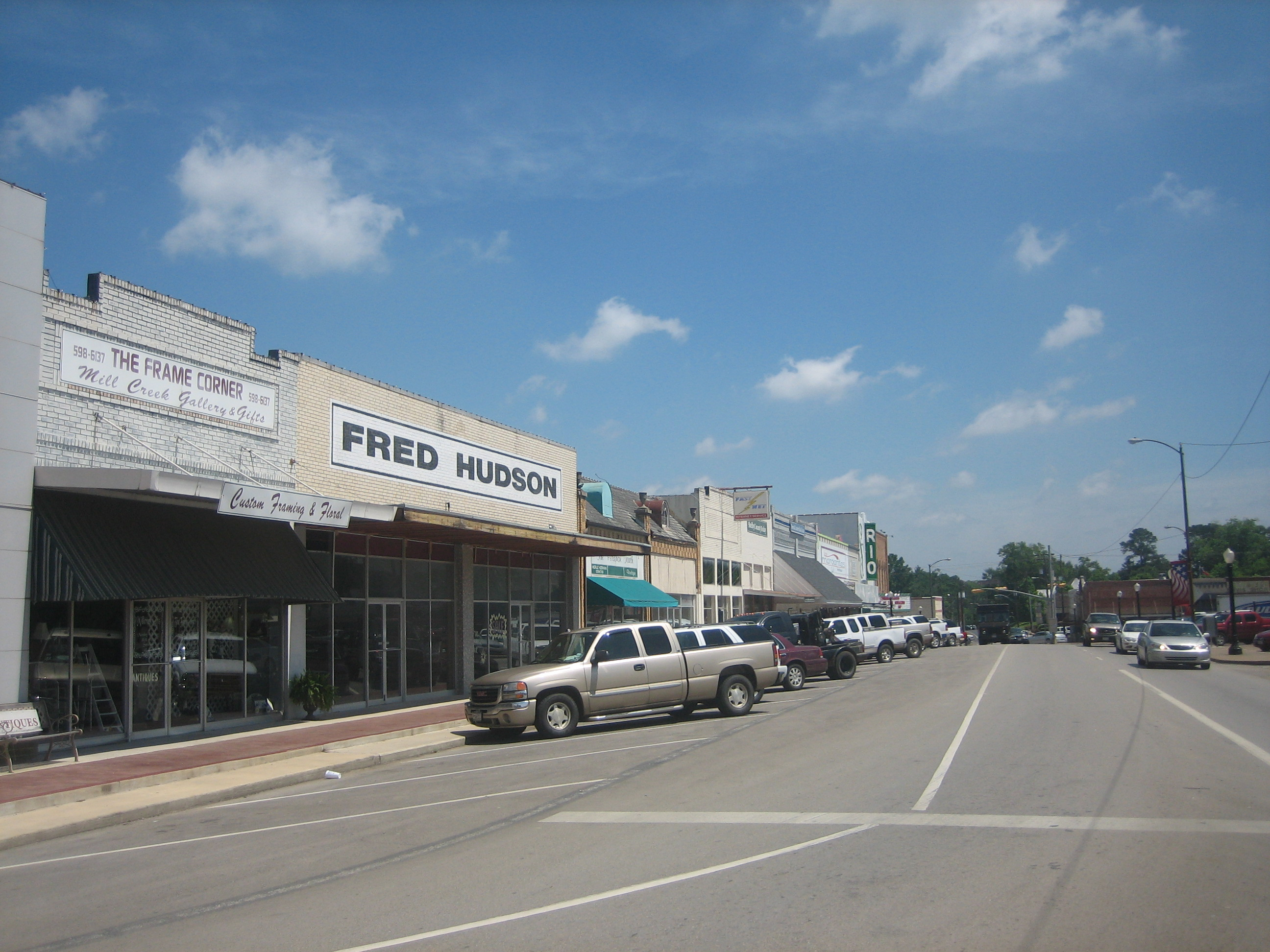
- Downtown Center, Texas

- Location of Center in 2009
- Coordinates: 31°47′35″N 94°10′46″W
- Country: United States
- State: Texas
- County: Shelby

Area
  - Total: 7.85 sq mi (20.34 km^{2})
  - Land: 7.84 sq mi (20.30 km^{2})
  - Water: 0.015 sq mi (0.04 km^{2})
- Elevation: 354 ft (108 m)

Population (2020)
  - Total: 5,221
  - Density: 660.2/sq mi (254.91/km^{2})
- Time zone: UTC-6 (Central (CST))
  - Summer (DST): UTC-5 (CDT)
- ZIP code: 75935
- Area code: 936
- FIPS code: 48-13732
- GNIS feature ID: 2409423
- Website: www.centertexas.org

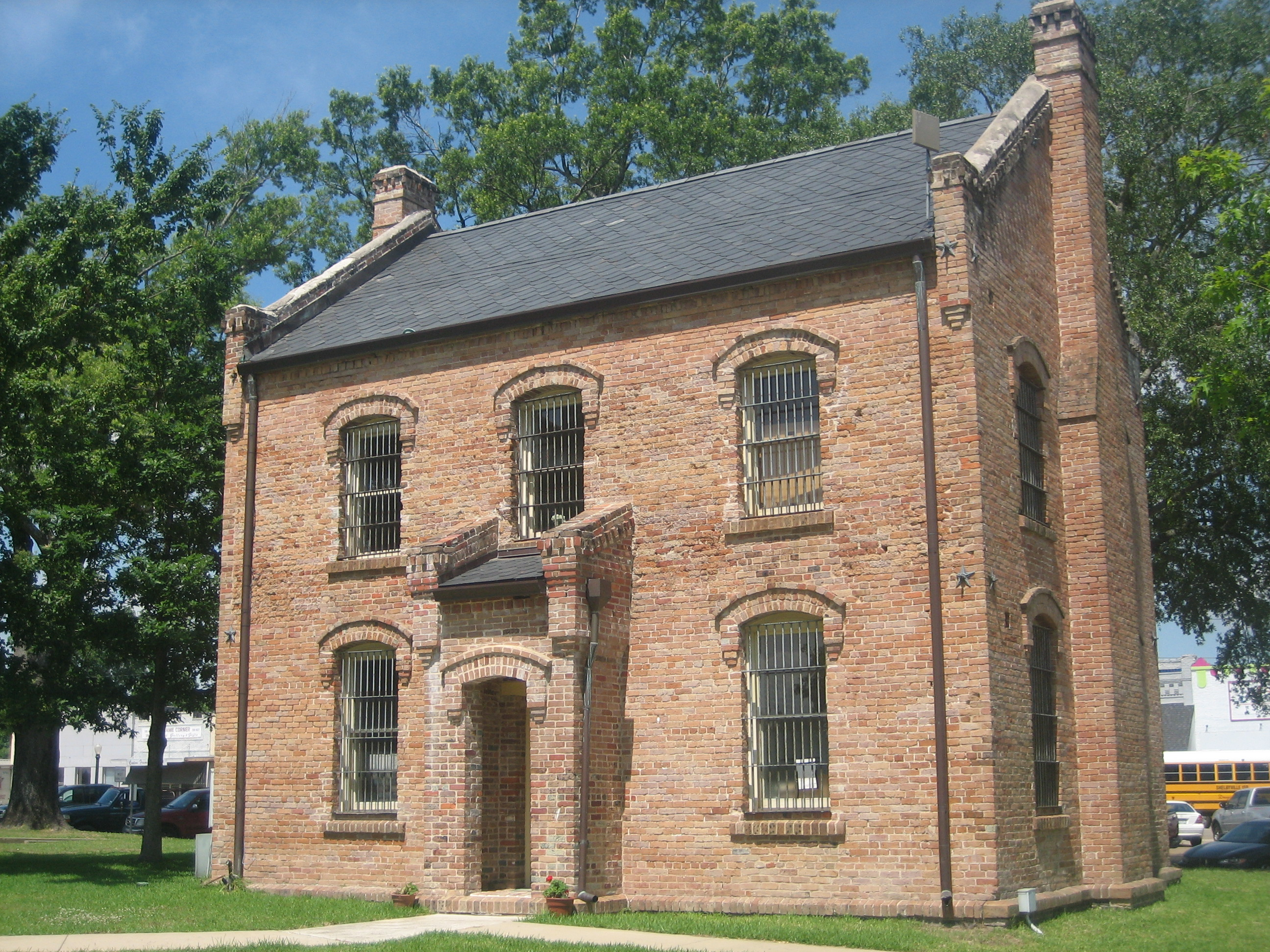
Chamber of Commerce Building in Center. This building is the original jail, built along with the Historic Courthouse. Both sit on the Town Square.

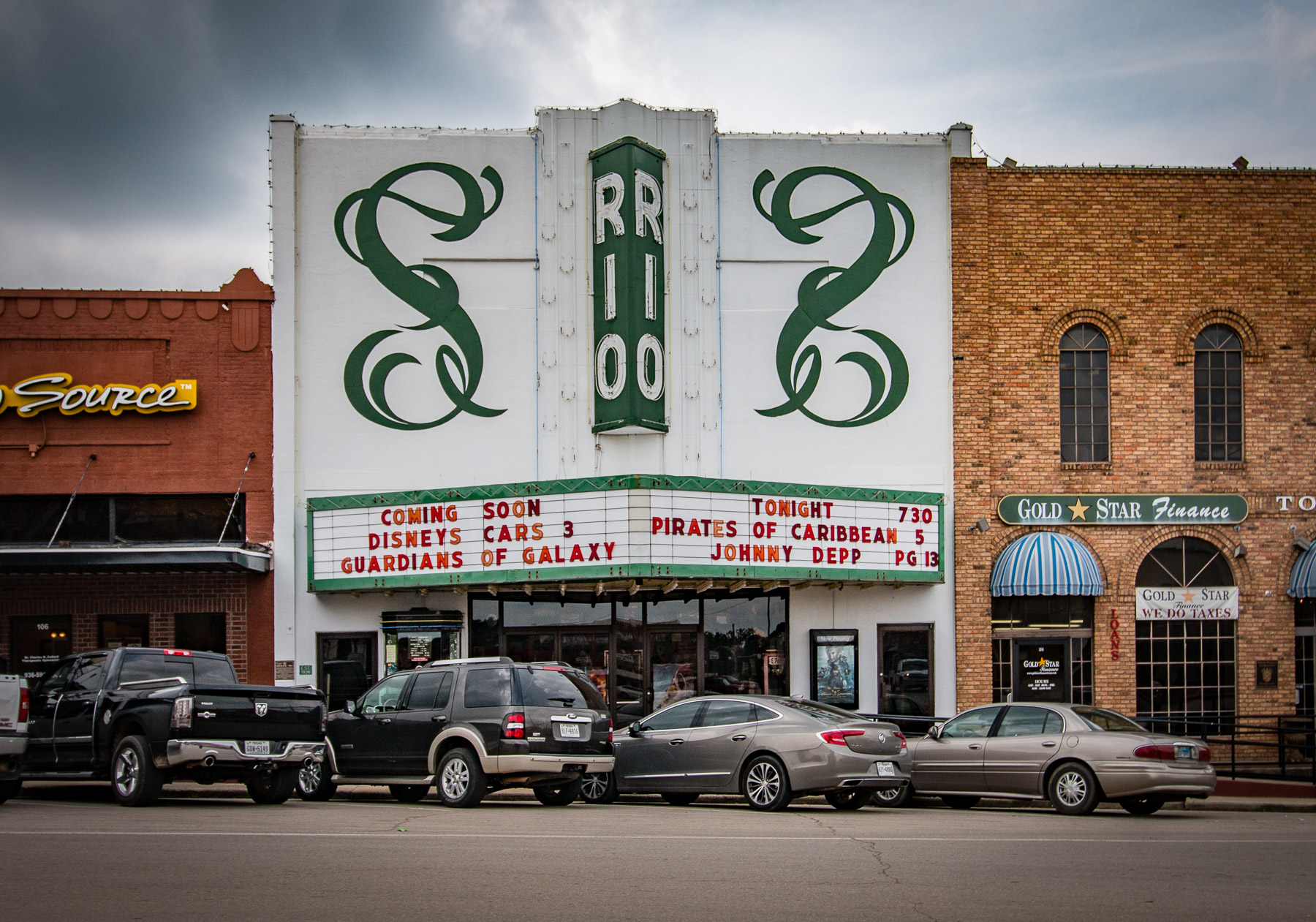
The Rio Theater in Center

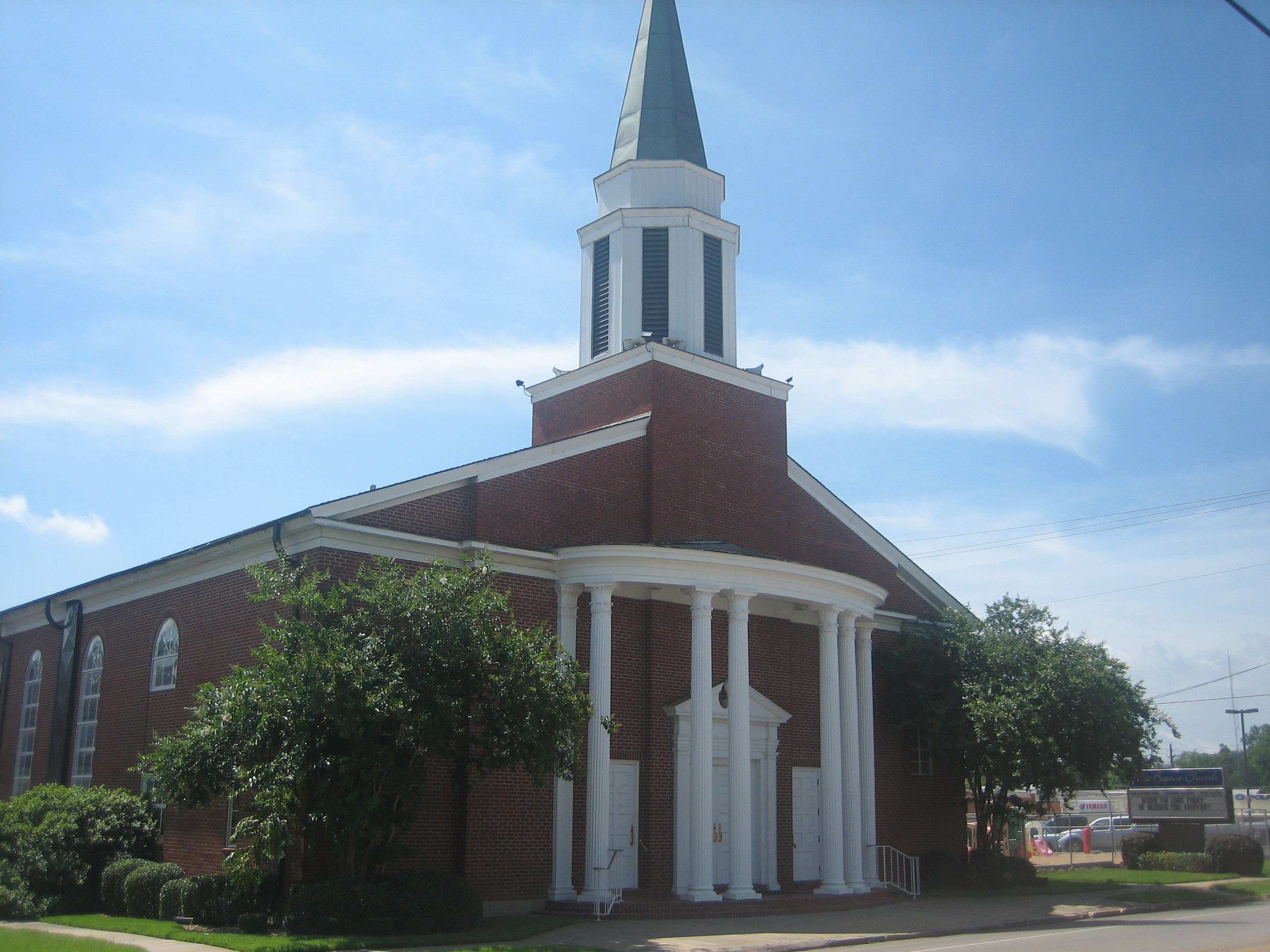
First Baptist Church at 117 Cora Street in Center is located next to the downtown section.

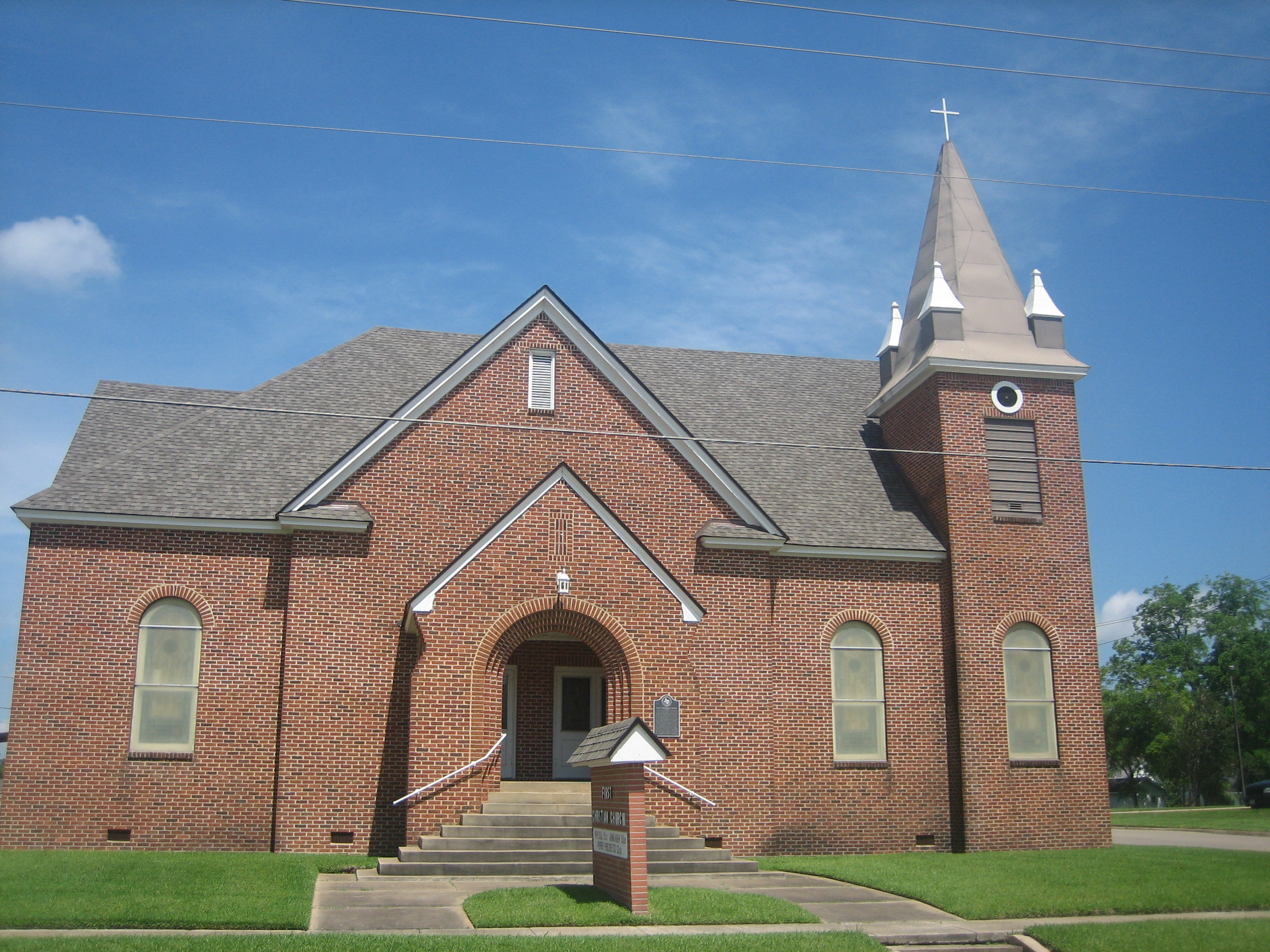
First Christian Church at 124 Cora Street in Center is one of the oldest congregations in the community.

Center is a city in Shelby County, Texas, United States. The population was 5,221 at the 2020 U.S. census. It is the county seat of Shelby County located in deep East Texas. It was named for its location near the center of Shelby County; the community is near the Louisiana border.

== Geography ==
Center is 17 miles (27 km) from the Louisiana border and 118 miles (190 km) north of Beaumont at the center of Shelby County. According to the United States Census Bureau, the city has a total area of 6.2 square miles (16 km^{2}), of which 6.2 square miles (16 km^{2}) is land and 0.16% is water.

=== Climate ===
The climate in this area is characterized by hot, humid summers and generally mild to cool winters. According to the Köppen Climate Classification system, Center has a humid subtropical climate, abbreviated "Cfa" on climate maps.

Climate data for Center, Texas (1991–2020 normals, extremes 1939–present)
Month	Jan	Feb	Mar	Apr	May	Jun	Jul	Aug	Sep	Oct	Nov	Dec	Year
Record high °F (°C)	85 (29)	90 (32)	94 (34)	94 (34)	100 (38)	108 (42)	110 (43)	110 (43)	112 (44)	100 (38)	91 (33)	84 (29)	112 (44)
Mean daily maximum °F (°C)	58.5 (14.7)	62.6 (17.0)	70.0 (21.1)	77.0 (25.0)	84.1 (28.9)	90.5 (32.5)	93.8 (34.3)	94.5 (34.7)	89.1 (31.7)	79.5 (26.4)	68.2 (20.1)	60.2 (15.7)	77.3 (25.2)
Daily mean °F (°C)	47.1 (8.4)	50.8 (10.4)	57.8 (14.3)	64.7 (18.2)	72.9 (22.7)	79.8 (26.6)	83.0 (28.3)	82.9 (28.3)	77.0 (25.0)	66.5 (19.2)	55.8 (13.2)	48.7 (9.3)	65.6 (18.7)
Mean daily minimum °F (°C)	35.7 (2.1)	39.0 (3.9)	45.7 (7.6)	52.5 (11.4)	61.8 (16.6)	69.1 (20.6)	72.2 (22.3)	71.3 (21.8)	64.9 (18.3)	53.4 (11.9)	43.3 (6.3)	37.2 (2.9)	53.8 (12.1)
Record low °F (°C)	5 (−15)	0 (−18)	15 (−9)	28 (−2)	40 (4)	45 (7)	55 (13)	52 (11)	39 (4)	26 (−3)	12 (−11)	2 (−17)	0 (−18)
Average precipitation inches (mm)	5.18 (132)	4.81 (122)	5.26 (134)	4.96 (126)	4.46 (113)	4.96 (126)	3.65 (93)	4.18 (106)	3.57 (91)	4.95 (126)	4.89 (124)	5.62 (143)	56.49 (1,435)
Average snowfall inches (cm)	0.2 (0.51)	0.4 (1.0)	0.0 (0.0)	0.0 (0.0)	0.0 (0.0)	0.0 (0.0)	0.0 (0.0)	0.0 (0.0)	0.0 (0.0)	0.0 (0.0)	0.0 (0.0)	0.0 (0.0)	0.6 (1.5)
Average precipitation days (≥ 0.01 in)	9.9	9.7	9.3	8.3	8.6	8.7	8.2	7.7	7.0	6.7	8.2	10.0	102.3
Average snowy days (≥ 0.1 in)	0.1	0.3	0.1	0.0	0.0	0.0	0.0	0.0	0.0	0.0	0.0	0.1	0.6
Source: NOAA

== Demographics ==
Historical population
Census	Pop.	Note	%±
1880	177		—
1910	1,684		—
1920	1,838		9.1%
1930	2,510		36.6%
1940	3,010		19.9%
1950	4,323		43.6%
1960	4,510		4.3%
1970	4,989		10.6%
1980	5,827		16.8%
1990	4,950		−15.1%
2000	5,678		14.7%
2010	5,193		−8.5%
2020	5,221		0.5%
U.S. Decennial Census

Center racial composition as of 2020 (NH = Non-Hispanic) (Note: Note: the US Census treats Hispanic/Latino as an ethnic category. This table excludes Latinos from the racial categories and assigns them to a separate category. Hispanics/Latinos can be of any race.)
Race	Number	Percentage
White (NH)	1,733	33.19%
Black or African American (NH)	1,641	31.43%
Native American or Alaska Native (NH)	6	0.11%
Asian (NH)	302	5.78%
Pacific Islander (NH)	10	0.19%
Some Other Race (NH)	24	0.46%
Mixed/Multi-Racial (NH)	110	2.11%
Hispanic or Latino	1,395	26.72%
Total	5,221	

=== 2020 census ===
As of the 2020 census, there were 5,221 people, 1,940 households, and 1,266 families residing in the city. The median age was 36.7 years, with 26.1% of residents under the age of 18 and 16.1% aged 65 or older. For every 100 females there were 94.7 males, and for every 100 females age 18 and over there were 90.8 males age 18 and over.

94.4% of residents lived in urban areas, while 5.6% lived in rural areas.

There were 1,940 households in Center, of which 36.5% had children under the age of 18 living in them. Of all households, 37.9% were married-couple households, 20.8% were households with a male householder and no spouse or partner present, and 36.5% were households with a female householder and no spouse or partner present. About 31.5% of all households were made up of individuals and 13.9% had someone living alone who was 65 years of age or older.

There were 2,269 housing units, of which 14.5% were vacant. Among occupied housing units, 54.0% were owner-occupied and 46.0% were renter-occupied. The homeowner vacancy rate was 1.8% and the rental vacancy rate was 13.1%.

Racial composition as of the 2020 census
Race	Percent
White	36.4%
Black or African American	31.7%
American Indian and Alaska Native	0.7%
Asian	5.8%
Native Hawaiian and Other Pacific Islander	0.2%
Some other race	16.3%
Two or more races	9.0%
Hispanic or Latino (of any race)	26.7%

=== 2000 census ===
As of the census of 2000, there were 5,678 people, 2,034 households, and 1,334 families residing in the city. The population density was 911.0 inhabitants per square mile (351.7/km^{2}). There were 2,290 housing units at an average density of 367.4 per square mile (141.9/km^{2}). The racial makeup of the city was 51.14% White, 34.22% African American, 0.23% Native American, 0.46% Asian, 10.95% from other races, and 2.99% from two or more races. Hispanic or Latino of any race were 18.05% of the population.

There were 2,034 households, out of which 32.2% had children under the age of 18 living with them, 41.1% were married couples living together, 20.3% had a female householder with no husband present, and 34.4% were non-families. 30.8% of all households were made up of individuals, and 17.2% had someone living alone who was 65 years of age or older. The average household size was 2.61 and the average family size was 3.23.

In the city, the population was spread out, with 26.3% under the age of 18, 10.9% from 18 to 24, 25.0% from 25 to 44, 18.8% from 45 to 64, and 19.0% who were 65 years of age or older. The median age was 36 years. For every 100 females, there were 86.8 males. For every 100 females age 18 and over, there were 82.4 males.

The median income for a household in the city was $26,061, and the median income for a family was $31,699. Males had a median income of $23,468 versus $19,441 for females. The per capita income for the city was $14,233. About 19.4% of families and 23.7% of the population were below the poverty line, including 31.5% of those under age 18 and 14.7% of those age 65 or over.

== History ==
Shelby County was one of the original 13 counties in Texas, being organized by the Republic of Texas Congress in 1837. The county was named for Isaac Shelby, an American military hero and governor of Kentucky. Shelby County eventually became one of the most populous and prosperous counties in the state because of its proximity to Louisiana and location along the Sabine River.

The settlement which eventually became the City of Center was originally called White Cottage. A post office was established at this settlement on April 6, 1848.

Al Johnson, an East Texas State Representative, introduced a bill to have all county seats be as close to the center of the county as possible. R.L. Parker, the County Clerk at the time, arranged to have the county surveyed and the center located. The originally county seat was Shelbyville, Texas located approximately 7 miles (11 km) from White Cottage. However, one night in 1866, a group of men led by Parker entered into the court house and stole all of the records and took them to a log cabin near White Cottage. Shortly after the incident, the community became known as Center, primarily to reflect the requisite location of the county seat.

The Center post office opened in October 1866. In 1869, Confederate veterans Captain Jesse Amason and James C. Wilson, with wife Margaret Davis Wilson, each donated 50 acres (20 ha) of land for the townsite of Center. According to one historical account, Amason would not give the land unless the new town would have a 4-acre (1.6 ha) town square, and that is the reason that Center has such a large square. Mr. Wilson owned considerable land in the southern quarter of the town. Much of that area is called the "Wilson Addition".

On the night of May 31, 1882, a fire erupted at the courthouse and the building was a complete loss. The county contracted with J.J. E. Gibson, an Irish immigrant, to construct a new courthouse and jail. When the bond of builders J.J. E. Gibson and Pat McLaughlin for the sum of $26,725 was issued in 1884 for them to erect a new courthouse for Shelby County, the firm of Wilson and Martin was among the securities. The courthouse, modeled after an Irish castle, was completed in November, 1885 and is still standing as the centerpiece of the Center Square.

The town of Center made national news twice in 1920s for the lynchings of black murder suspects without a trial. On August 3, 1920, Lige Daniels was seized by an angry mob that broke into the Shelby County Jail, where he was being held on charges of the beating death of a woman. Daniels, an 18-year old black man, was dragged out and hanged from a tree in front of the courthouse, famous as the "Center Hanging Oak". The oak tree was used again as a gallows on May 21, 1928, when another mob intercepted another 18-year old African-American, accused murderer Eolis Evans, as he was being returned to the county jail. The "hanging oak" tree itself died in 1990 and was cut down.

At noon on February 12, 1950, an F3 tornado touched down in Center, destroying several buildings. The tornado killed three and injured at least 15 people.

== Events ==
The city celebrates a county wide East Texas Poultry Festival in October each year. The poultry festival is accompanied by the Poultry Festival Pageant in which high school Juniors of the county participate. The Pageant crowns a Poultry Festival Queen who presides over the three-day Poultry Festival. The festival is in honor of John Moosberg who started the broiler house system in Shelby County. A mural of the events is located in the Farmers State Bank with John Mooseberg's picture. The Queen is decided by a board of non-partisan, appointed judges.

Also in Shelby County there is the Miss Shelby County Pageant. The Pageant is open to all Shelby County Young Ladies and a PreTeen, JrTeen, Teen and Miss Queen is crowned. The title holder represents Shelby County throughout her annual reign at many area events. Also each fall, in August, junior girls from Shelby County high schools compete against each other in the Poultry festival pageant the winner wins a $2,000 scholarship.

== Media ==
The Light and Champion, a news and information company, marked its 140th year of operation in 2017. Based in Center, it serves Shelby County, as well as Logansport, Louisiana. The Light and Champion produces a weekly print edition, a weekly free-distribution print product called The Merchandiser. The Light and Champion is owned by Times Media Group in Tempe, Arizona.

== Notable people ==
- Charlie Bradshaw, professional football player
- John Campbell, blues guitarist
- Wayne Christian, Texas State Representative
- Dan Duncan, oil tycoon, billionaire, and philanthropist
- Cade Foehner, 4th place contestant in the 16th season of American Idol
- Bryan Hitt, drummer for REO Speedwagon
- Charles McClelland, Houston Police Department
- Charles Ray, U.S. diplomat
- John S. Redditt, Texas politician and businessman
- Del Shofner, professional football player, MVP of 1957 Sugar Bowl
- McNeil Moore, NFL defensive back for the Chicago Bears (1954-1957)
- Michael Montgomery, professional defensive lineman for the Green Bay Packers (2005-2010); Minnesota Vikings (2010); the UFL's Las Vegas Locomotives (2011); and the CFL's Montreal Alouettes (2012)

== Outlying communities ==
- Aiken
- Spann's Chapel
- Mt. Herman
- Jericho
- Short
- James
- Folsom Chapel
- Dreka
- Neuville

== Government and infrastructure ==
The City of Center was incorporated in 1893, however, this incorporation was dissolved and the city was reincorporated by means of another charter in 1901. The city developed and adopted a new home rule charter on April 7, 1984. The City of Center operates under the home rule charter with a council-manager form of government. The governing body, the Center City Council, is composed of a mayor, two council members elected "at-large" by citywide elections and four members elected from single member districts. The mayor and council members serve staggered two year terms. The mayor and council beside the city manager, are responsible for casting a vision and direction for the city, enacting legislation in the form of ordinances and resolutions, adopting and amending budgets, making appointments to the different boards and commissions and determining the policies of the city. The United States Postal Service operates the Center Post Office.

== Education ==
The City of Center is served by the Center Independent School District.

== See also ==
- Impact of the COVID-19 pandemic on the meat industry in the United States
