= 1963 Philadelphia Eagles season =

NFL team season

- Owner: Happy Hundred
- Head coach: Nick Skorich

Results
- Record: 2–10–2
- Division place: 7th NFL Eastern
- Playoffs: Did not qualify
- Pro Bowlers: LB Maxie Baughan; TE Pete Retzlaff; HB Timmy Brown

The 1963 Philadelphia Eagles season was the franchise's 31st season in the National Football League. The team failed to improve on their three-win season and finished with a record of 2–10–2.

== Offseason ==
The 1963 NFL draft and the 1963 AFL draft

== Personnel ==
=== Staff / Coaches ===
1963 Philadelphia Eagles staff
Front office: Principal / Majority Owner – Jerry Wolman; General manager – Vince McNally; Head coaches: Head coach - Nick Skorich; Offensive coaches: Offensive Assistant - Sonny Grandelius; Ends Coach - Pete Retzlaff	Defensive coaches: Defensive Line - Chuck Cherundolo; Defensive Backs / Secondary – Jerry Williams; Defensive Assistant Coach - Laurie Niemi

=== Roster ===
1963 Philadelphia Eagles roster
Quarterbacks (QB): 17 Ralph Guglielmi; 10 King Hill P; 9 Sonny Jurgensen; Running backs (RB): 22 Timmy Brown; 28 Paul Dudley; 35 Ted Dean; 26 Clarence Peaks; 37 Tom Woodeshick; Wide receivers (WR): 81 Ron Goodwin; 80 Gary Henson; 25 Tommy McDonald; 85 Ralph Smith; Tight ends (TE): 44 Pete Retzlaff	Offensive linemen (OL): 64 Ed Blaine G; 66 Bill Byrne G; 67 Pete Case G; 78 Dave Graham T; 51 Jim Schrader C; 70 Jim Skaggs G; 76 J. D. Smith T; Defensive linemen (DL): 74 Riley Gunnels DT; 77 Ray Mansfield DT; 65 John Mellekas DT; 83 Bill Quinlan DE; 68 Bobby Richards DE/DT; 82 George Tarasovic DE	Linebackers (LB): 34 Lee Roy Caffey OLB; 52 Dave Lloyd MLB; 55 Maxie Baughan OLB; 43 Ralph Heck OLB; 42 Bob Harrison OLB; Defensive backs (DB): 22 Irv Cross CB; 45 Don Burroughs FS; 21 Jimmy Carr SS; 24 Nate Ramsey CB; 23 Mike McClellan CB/S; Special teams (ST): 84 Mike Clark K	Reserve: 72 Frank Fuller DT (IR); 61 Howard Keys G/C (IR); 62 Jerry Mazzanti DE (IR); 86 Dick Stafford DE (IR); 63 Mike Woulfe LB (IR); Rookies in italics

== Regular season ==
=== Schedule ===
Week	Date	Opponent	Result	Record	Venue	Attendance
1	September 15	**Pittsburgh Steelers**	**T** 21–21	0–0–1	Franklin Field	58,205
2	September 22	**St. Louis Cardinals**	**L** 24–28	0–1–1	Franklin Field	60,671
3	September 29	**New York Giants**	**L** 14–37	0–2–1	Franklin Field	60,671
4	October 6	**Dallas Cowboys**	**W** 24–21	1–2–1	Franklin Field	60,671
5	October 13	at **Washington Redskins**	**W** 37–24	2–2–1	D.C. Stadium	49,219
6	October 20	at **Cleveland Browns**	**L** 7–37	2–3–1	Cleveland Municipal Stadium	75,174
7	October 27	at Chicago Bears	**L** 7–16	2–4–1	Wrigley Field	48,514
8	November 3	**Cleveland Browns**	**L** 17–23	2–5–1	Franklin Field	60,671
9	November 10	at **New York Giants**	**L** 14–42	2–6–1	Yankee Stadium	62,936
10	November 17	at **Dallas Cowboys**	**L** 20–27	2–7–1	Cotton Bowl	23,694
11	November 24	**Washington Redskins**	**L** 10–13	2–8–1	Franklin Field	60,671
12	December 1	at **Pittsburgh Steelers**	**T** 20–20	2–8–2	Forbes Field	16,721
13	December 8	at **St. Louis Cardinals**	**L** 14–38	2–9–2	Busch Stadium	15,979
14	December 15	Minnesota Vikings	**L** 13–34	2–10–2	Franklin Field	57,403

Note: Intra-conference opponents are in bold text.

== Standings ==
NFL Eastern Conference
	W	L	T	PCT	CONF	PF	PA	STK
New York Giants	11	3	0	.786	9–3	448	280	W3
Cleveland Browns	10	4	0	.714	9–3	343	262	W1
St. Louis Cardinals	9	5	0	.643	8–4	341	283	L1
Pittsburgh Steelers	7	4	3	.636	7–3–2	321	295	L1
Dallas Cowboys	4	10	0	.286	3–9	305	378	W1
Washington Redskins	3	11	0	.214	2–10	279	398	L3
Philadelphia Eagles	2	10	2	.167	2–8–2	242	381	L2

Note: Tie games were not officially counted in the standings until 1972.
