= Center Independent School District =

School district in Texas

Coordinates: 31.7932°N 94.184776°W

Center Independent School District is a public school district based in Center, Texas (USA).

In 2009, the school district was rated "academically acceptable" by the Texas Education Agency.

School Colors - Purple and Gold

School Mascot - Rough Riders

== Schools ==
- Center High School (Grades 9–12)
- Center Middle School (Grades 6–8)
- Center Elementary School (Grades 3–5)
- F.L. Moffett Primary School (Grades PK-2)
