= Center High School (Texas) =

Location
- 658 Roughrider Drive; Center, Texas 75935; United States; 31.7569°N 94.0786°W

Information
- School type: Public high school
- School district: Center Independent School District
- Principal: Amanda Clark
- Staff: 53.05 (FTE)
- Grades: 9-12
- Enrollment: 685 (2023–2024)
- Student to teacher ratio: 12.91
- Colors: Purple & gold
- Athletics conference: UIL Class AAAA
- Mascot: Roughrider
- Newspaper: The Lariat
- Website: http://www.centerisd.org

Center High School is a public, four-year high school located in Center, Texas. United States. It is classified as a 4A school by the University Interscholastic League. It is part of the Center Independent School District and is located in central Shelby County, Texas. In 2015, the school was rated "Met Standard".

In 2013, U.S. News & World Report gave Center High School a bronze medal and named it one of the best high schools in the nation.

== History ==
Center High School dates back prior to 1900 as "Center School". The earliest graduating class was in 1903, with six students.

The original high school building is the current alternative school building, known as Roughrider Academy. The school was built in 1939. The building caught fire in 1963, but was extinguished.

The current high school building has a new wing specifically designed for career learning opportunities such as culinary, graphic design, and business.

== Athletics ==
The school is home to the Center Roughriders. The team name comes from the Rough Riders.

The Center Roughriders compete in the following sports:

- Football
- Basketball
- Tennis *
- Volleyball
- Golf
- Baseball
- Softball
- Soccer *
- Track and field *
- Powerlifting *

Key: * - has been to state within the past decade.

== Band ==
The Roughrider Band, more commonly known as the Pride of Shelby County, is a band program, participates in the National Association of Military Marching Band competition, where they compete against other 4A schools.

== Theater arts ==
The Center High School theater department is active in the UIL One Act Play competition.

The theater department puts on an annual Christmas play as well as a traditional production called "Center Stage". The earliest documented Center play was in 1930.

== Spirit organizations ==
The school has varsity and junior varsity cheerleading. The mascot costume, Rowdy the Rough Rider, is typically worn by an upperclassman.

The school's award-winning dance team is known as The Chaparrals.

The Twirlers perform at half-time during the football games before the marching band performs. The Twirlers date back to 1951.

== Notable alumni ==
- McNeil Moore, former professional NFL defensive back for the Chicago Bears
