= 1963 NFL season =

American football season

Regular season
- Duration: September 14 – December 29, 1963
- East Champions: New York Giants
- West Champions: Chicago Bears

Championship Game
- Champions: Chicago Bears

NFL teams: West, East

The 1963 NFL season was the 44th regular season of the National Football League.

On April 17, NFL commissioner Pete Rozelle suspended Green Bay Packers running back Paul Hornung and Detroit Lions defensive tackle Alex Karras indefinitely for gambling on their own teams, as well as other NFL games; Hornung and Karras would miss the entire season, while five of Karras' teammates were fined $2,000 each for placing bets on a game in which they did not participate.

This was the final season of the 37-man roster; it was expanded to forty for 1964.

The season ended with the Chicago Bears defeating the New York Giants at Wrigley Field in the NFL Championship Game.

== Draft ==
The 1963 NFL draft was held December 3, 1962, at Chicago's Sheraton Hotel & Towers. With the first pick, the Los Angeles Rams selected quarterback Terry Baker from Oregon State, the Heisman Trophy winner.

== Regular season ==
=== Effects of the JFK assassination ===
In week 11 on November 24, just two days after the assassination of President John F. Kennedy, the NFL played its normal schedule of games. League commissioner Rozelle said about playing the games: "It has been traditional in sports for athletes to perform in times of great personal tragedy. Football was Mr. Kennedy's game. He thrived on competition." Attendance at games went unaffected despite the assassination. Although the choice to play the games was protested, and Rozelle had also eventually regretted the decision, he stated that Kennedy's press secretary, Pierre Salinger, had urged him to allow the games to be played.

However, the Philadelphia Eagles and the Washington Redskins had sought postponement of the games. Frank McNamee, a part of the Eagles’ Happy Hundred ownership group, refused to attend the game in favor of a memorial service at nearby Independence Hall, claiming that “the game is being played by order of the commissioner”. Eventually, the game between the two teams in Philadelphia saw acts of kindness from both sides. Before the game, each of the Eagles players contributed $50 to the family of Dallas police officer J.D. Tippit, who was killed by the assassin Lee Harvey Oswald. After the game ended, players on the Redskins asked head coach Bill McPeak to send the game ball to the White House, thanking Rozelle for allowing the games to be played that weekend, saying that they were "playing...for President Kennedy and in his memory."

No NFL games were telecast, since on the afternoon of November 22, just after Kennedy had been pronounced dead, CBS President Frank Stanton ordered that all regular programming be pre-empted until after Kennedy was buried. Normal programming, including the NFL, was replaced by non-stop news coverage, broadcast without commercials.

=== Division races ===
Both division races were undecided until the final games of the regular season. In the Eastern, the Browns were 7–1–0 after eight games, but on November 10, the Browns lost 9–7 at Pittsburgh, while the Giants beat the Eagles 42–14, to tie Cleveland at 7–2–0. When the Giants won again and the Browns lost, the former had the lead.

The Western race was close as well. The Bears were 5–0 and the Packers 4–1 entering week 6; Green Bay won at St. Louis, 30–7, while Chicago lost 20–14 at San Francisco, tying the Bears and Packers for the lead at 5–1. Both teams continued to win, and then met in Chicago in week 10 on November 17, where the Bears prevailed decisively, 26–7.

The week 11 games took place two days after the Kennedy assassination. Although the fourth-year American Football League (AFL) postponed its schedule, the NFL chose to play, although the games were not televised due to round-the-clock network television coverage of the assassination aftermath. The Giants lost at home to St. Louis, 24–17, while Cleveland beat visiting Dallas 27–17, to give the three teams identical 8–3–0 records. The Bears were losing at Pittsburgh, until Roger Leclerc kicked a field goal to get a 17–17 tie, and to stay half a game ahead of Green Bay.

In week 12, Green Bay's win was denied when the Lions tied the game 13–13 with a last-minute touchdown in Detroit on Thanksgiving Day, while Chicago averted another loss by tying Minnesota 17–17 on Sunday. The three-way tie in the East was pared down when Cleveland beat St. Louis 24–10, and New York won 34–27 over Dallas.

Week 13 saw both the Bears and Packers winning, while Cleveland lost to Detroit, 38–10. New York won 44–14 over Washington, but at 10–3–0, New York was trailed by Pittsburgh, which had an unusual 7–3–3 record, and the final game of the season would match the Steelers and Giants at Yankee Stadium.

Under the rules of the day (ties discarded), a Pittsburgh win over the Giants would have resulted with New York at 10–4–0 (.714) and the Steelers at 8–3–3 (.727) and the trip to the championship game. The Steelers had won the first meeting in Pittsburgh 31–0 on September 22. In a game that decided the conference title, New York beat Pittsburgh 33–17, and the Steelers fell to fourth in the East.

In the Western race, Green Bay needed to win on the road and for Chicago to lose at home. The Packers played Saturday at Kezar Stadium in San Francisco and beat the league-worst 49ers, 21–17. The Bears' 24–14 win over Detroit at Wrigley Field on Sunday afternoon was announced to the Packers during their flight home, ending their pursuit of a third consecutive league title.

Although the Packers' 11–2–1 record without Hornung was the second-best in the league and one of the best in their history, the two losses to Chicago kept them in second place in the West. Green Bay played in the consolation Playoff Bowl in Miami against East runner-up Cleveland on January 5.

Week	Western		Eastern	
1	3 teams (Chi, Det, Min)	1–0–0	3 teams (Cle, NYG, StL)	1–0–0
2	Chicago Bears	2–0–0	Tie (Cle, StL)	2–0–0
3	Chicago Bears	3–0–0	Cleveland Browns	3–0–0
4	Chicago Bears	4–0–0	Cleveland Browns	4–0–0
5	Chicago Bears	5–0–0	Cleveland Browns	5–0–0
6	Tie (Chi, GB)	5–1–0	Cleveland Browns	6–0–0
7	Tie (Chi, GB)	6–1–0	Cleveland Browns	6–1–0
8	Tie (Chi, GB)	7–1–0	Cleveland Browns	7–1–0
9	Tie (Chi, GB)	8–1–0	Tie (Cle, NYG)	7–2–0
10	Chicago Bears	9–1–0	New York Giants	8–2–0
11	Chicago Bears	9–1–1	Tie (Cle, NYG, StL)	8–3–0
12	Chicago Bears	9–1–2	Tie (Cle, NYG)	9–3–0
13	Chicago Bears	10–1–2	New York Giants	10–3–0
14	Chicago Bears	11–1–2	New York Giants	11–3–0

== Final standings ==
NFL Eastern Conference
	W	L	T	PCT	CONF	PF	PA	STK
New York Giants	11	3	0	.786	9–3	448	280	W3
Cleveland Browns	10	4	0	.714	9–3	343	262	W1
St. Louis Cardinals	9	5	0	.643	8–4	341	283	L1
Pittsburgh Steelers	7	4	3	.636	7–3–2	321	295	L1
Dallas Cowboys	4	10	0	.286	3–9	305	378	W1
Washington Redskins	3	11	0	.214	2–10	279	398	L3
Philadelphia Eagles	2	10	2	.167	2–8–2	242	381	L2

Note: Tie games were not officially counted in the standings until 1972.

NFL Western Conference
	W	L	T	PCT	CONF	PF	PA	STK
Chicago Bears	11	1	2	.917	10–1–1	301	144	W2
Green Bay Packers	11	2	1	.846	9–2–1	369	206	W2
Baltimore Colts	8	6	0	.571	7–5	316	285	W3
Detroit Lions	5	8	1	.385	4–7–1	326	265	L1
Minnesota Vikings	5	8	1	.385	4–7–1	309	390	W1
Los Angeles Rams	5	9	0	.357	5–7	210	350	L2
San Francisco 49ers	2	12	0	.143	1–11	198	391	L5

Note: Tie games were not officially counted in the standings until 1972.

== Postseason ==
=== NFL Championship Game ===
Chicago 14, New York 10 at Wrigley Field in Chicago, Illinois, on December 29.

=== Playoff Bowl ===
The Playoff Bowl was between the division runners-up, for third place in the league. This was its fourth year and it was played a week after the title game.

- Green Bay 40, Cleveland 23 at Orange Bowl in Miami, Florida, on January 5, 1964.

== Attendance ==
Regular season paid attendance set a record at 4,163,643, an increase of 160,222 (4.0%) over 1962, yielding an average of 42,486 for the 98 games.

The championship game in Chicago drew 45,801 at Wrigley Field on December 29, the third-place Playoff Bowl in Miami had 54,921 at the Orange Bowl on January 5, and the Pro Bowl in Los Angeles drew 67,242 at the L.A. Coliseum on January 12. The attendance for the 33 preseason games was 1,108,636 (average: 33,595).

== Awards ==
Most Valuable Player	Y. A. Tittle, quarterback, New York
Coach of the Year	George Halas, Chicago

== Coaching changes ==
=== Offseason ===
- Baltimore Colts: Weeb Ewbank was replaced by Don Shula.
- Cleveland Browns: Paul Brown was replaced by Blanton Collier.

=== In-season ===
- San Francisco 49ers: Red Hickey resigned after three games, and was replaced by Jack Christiansen.

== See also ==
- 1963 American Football League season
