= Robert Khayat =

American football player (born 1938)

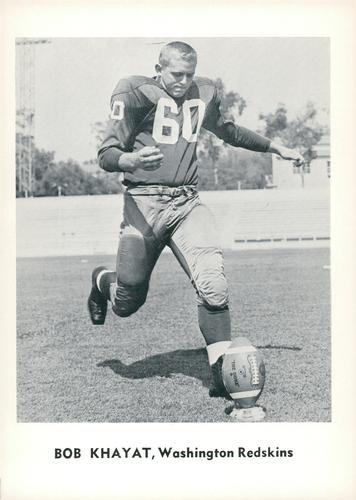

15th chancellor of the University of Mississippi
- In office July 1, 1995 – June 15, 2009
- Preceded by: R. Gerald Turner
- Succeeded by: Daniel Jones

Personal details
- Born: April 18, 1938 (age 88) Moss Point, Mississippi, U.S.
- Education: University of Mississippi
- Football career

No. 60
- Position: Placekicker

Personal information
- Listed height: 6 ft 2 in (1.88 m)
- Listed weight: 230 lb (104 kg)

Career information
- College: Mississippi
- NFL draft: 1960: 6th round, 69 (by the Cleveland Browns)th overall pick
- AFL draft: 1960

Career history

Playing
- Washington Redskins (1960, 1962–1963)

Operations
- Mississippi (1994) (Interim athletic director)

Awards and highlights
- Pro Bowl (1960)
- Stats at Pro Football Reference

Robert Conrad Khayat (born April 18, 1938) is an American former academic administrator and football player who was the 15th chancellor of the University of Mississippi. He played football professionally as a placekicker, guard, and center for the Washington Redskins of the National Football League (NFL).

Khayat played college football for the Ole Miss Rebels and was selected in the sixth round of the 1960 NFL draft. He played for the Washington for three seasons, earning a Pro Bowl selection in 1960. After his football career, Khayat became a lawyer. He was appointed chancellor of the University of Mississippi in 1995.

== Early life ==
Khayat was born in Moss Point, Mississippi, to Lebanese parents. His family attended a Methodist church where they sat in the back due to racial discrimination. He attended Moss Point High School and the University of Mississippi. He received both Bachelor of Arts and Juris Doctor degrees from the University of Mississippi. He also played football for the Ole Miss Rebels football team from 1957 to 1959. He also received an LL.M. degree from Yale University.

== Professional football career ==
Khayat was selected in the sixth round by the Cleveland Browns in the 1960 NFL draft. He was then traded to the Washington Redskins along with lineman Fran O'Brien in April 1960 for veteran kicker Sam Baker.

Khayat played for the Redskins during the 1960, 1962, and 1963 seasons. Following the 1960 season, he was named to the Pro Bowl squad. He appeared in a total of 40 NFL games and kicked 38 field goals and 90 extra points.

His brother Eddie Khayat also played and coached in the NFL.

== Later life ==
Khayat later became a lawyer and taught law at the University of Mississippi School of Law.

He was appointed chancellor in 1995. In one of his first acts as chancellor, Khayat arranged for a $5.4 million gift from Jim and Sally Barksdale to establish an honors college at the university. In 1996, with enrollment declining, Khayat retained the public relations firm, Burson-Marsteller, to conduct a survey of public perception — including university symbols. When The New York Times reported on the review, which included the Confederate Flag and other Old South symbols, a media frenzy ensued.

On January 6, 2009, Khayat announced his retirement effective June 30, 2009. He was succeeded by Daniel Jones on June 15, 2009.

Khayat's memoir, The Education of a Lifetime, was published on September 10, 2013.
