= Tom Janik =

American football player (1940–2009)

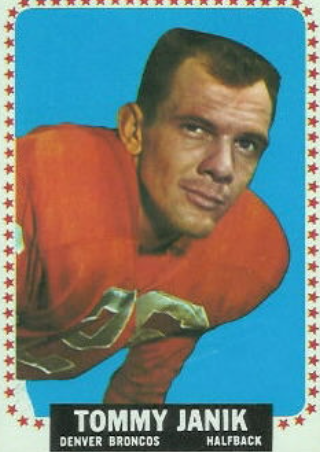

No. 26, 27, 21
- Positions: Defensive back, Punter

Personal information
- Born: September 6, 1940; Poth, Texas, U.S.
- Died: November 21, 2009 (aged 69); Poth, Texas, U.S.
- Listed height: 6 ft 3 in (1.91 m)
- Listed weight: 190 lb (86 kg)

Career information
- High school: Poth
- College: Texas A&M; Texas A&M-Kingsville
- NFL draft: 1963: 12th round, 167th overall pick
- AFL draft: 1963: 3rd round, 21st overall pick

Career history
- Denver Broncos (1963–1964); Buffalo Bills (1965–1968); Boston / New England Patriots (1969–1971)

Awards and highlights
- AFL champion (1965); AFL All-Star (1967)

Career NFL/AFL statistics
- Punts: 253
- Punting yards: 9,890
- Longest punt: 58
- Interceptions: 25
- Fumble recoveries: 1
- Stats at Pro Football Reference

Thomas Alvin Janik (Pronounced: Yah-NICK) (September 6, 1940 – November 21, 2009) was an American professional football defensive back and punter, playing in the American Football League (AFL) from 1963 to 1969 and then playing his final two seasons in the National Football League (NFL). He had 10 interceptions in 1967, tying for the AFL lead that year. He was selected to the AFL All-Star team in 1967. The Associated Press selected him AFL Defensive Player of the Week in the 1966, 1967 and 1968 seasons. When he retired after the 1971 season, he had the fourth most interception returns for touchdowns in AFL/NFL history. He returned interceptions against three Pro Football Hall of Fame quarterbacks for touchdowns (Len Dawson, Bob Griese and Joe Namath).

== Early life and college career ==
Thomas Alvin Janik was born on September 6, 1940, in Poth, Texas, about 35 miles from San Antonio. He attended Poth High School, where he was the quarterback on the football team. He excelled as both a passer and runner. In one game as a senior in 1958, he had four touchdown runs of 63, 30, 26 and five yards; and threw a 50-yard touchdown pass. He was a two-way player who also played defense for the Poth Pirates.

== College career ==
He played one season of college football with Texas A&M, and then transferred to Texas A&I (now Texas A&M University – Kingsville), where he played three seasons on the Javelinas football team in the Lone Star Conference. He had been a quarterback on offense at Texas A&M, but was switched to halfback on offense at Texas A&I.

Janik was a 6 ft 4 in (1.93 m) sophomore in 1960 when he came to Texas A&I. He was a two-way player, punter and kick returner for the Javelinas. In an early November 1960 game, playing with an injured shoulder, he had a touchdown on a 57-yard rushing play and another touchdown on a 68-yard punt return. He was also one of the top punters in the Lone Star Conference. He was an All-Conference running back in 1960.

In 1960, Texas A&I was 7–1–1 overall, and won the Lone Star Conference. They appeared in the first Great Southwest Bowl at the Gopher Bowl in Grand Prairie, Texas, facing an undefeated 10–0 Arkansas Tech team. Texas A&I defeated Arkansas Tech 45–14. Janik played left halfback in the game and scored a rushing touchdown.

Janik missed most of his junior season (1961) with a broken collarbone. In 1962, Texas A&I again won the Lone Star Conference title. As a 6 ft 4 in 185 lb (83.9 kg) senior, Janik played running back on offense, safety on defense and was the punter. He led the team in rushing, receiving, scoring and punting. In two early season games, he had 115 yards on 13 carries and 99 yards on eight carries.

Janik was unanimously selected by the Conference's coaches to the All-Lone Star Conference Team as a kicker and running back. He was the only player unanimously selected. He was also named to the All-Texas College Team. He was selected to play in the inaugural Southwest Challenge Bowl where a team of southwest college all-stars played against a team of national all-stars. He played both halfback on offense and safety on defense in the game.

== Professional career ==
=== Denver Broncos ===
Janik was drafted by the Detroit Lions in the 12th round of the 1963 NFL draft (167th overall). The Denver Broncos selected Janik in the third round of the 1963 AFL draft, 21st overall. He signed with the Broncos in early December 1962. The Broncos announced at the time they would use him as a defensive back. As a rookie in 1963, he started 10 games at right cornerback and free safety for the Broncos, with two interceptions. He started four games as a defensive back in 1964, with one interception. He intercepted a pass thrown by future Hall of Fame Kansas City Chiefs' quarterback Len Dawson that he returned 22 yards for a touchdown. He also punted 10 times that season, averaging 37.4 yards per punt.

=== Buffalo Bills ===
In September 1965, the Broncos traded Janik to the Buffalo Bills for a 1966 seventh round draft pick. He was on the Bronco's taxi squad at the time of the trade. He was a reserve defensive back for the Bills in 1965, and did not start any games. The Bills were AFL champions that season, and Janik played in the championship game as a substitute and on special teams.

Although Janik played in the 1965 season's All-Star Game, he was not selected as an all-star. Rather, the Bills as a team played against a team of AFL All-Stars in the January 1966 AFL All-Star Game. Having the league champion team play against a team of all-stars from the seven other AFL teams was a new format for the All-Star Game; and was not a format used in the NFL (though similar to the Chicago College All-Star Game where the NFL champion played a team of college all-stars).

In 1966, Janik started 11 games at left cornerback. He had eight interceptions that season, two of which he returned for touchdowns. He also had a quarterback sack. He was tied for second in the AFL in interceptions. He returned an interception 34 yards for a touchdown in a November 20 game against the Houston Oilers.

Janik had two interceptions in an October 2, 1966 game against the Kansas City Chiefs (who would go on to play in Super Bowl I that season). He intercepted another Len Dawson pass in the first quarter and then a Pete Beathard pass near the end of the fourth quarter, with the Chiefs at the Buffalo seven yard line. In the third quarter, with the Bills ahead by one point, Janik broke up a pass to the Chiefs' first-team All-AFL wide receiver Otis Taylor in the end zone. Janik also have five unassisted tackles in the 29–14 Bills victory. The Associated Press (AP) named Janik its AFL Defensive Player of the Week.

In 1967, Janik started 10 games for the Bills. He tied for the AFL league lead with 10 interceptions that season; once again returning two for touchdowns. Janik's 10 interceptions tied the Bills' single season interception record set by Billy Atkins in 1961.

Janik cold play all four defensive backfield positions. In a December 9 game against the Boston Patriots, he intercepted two passes in the first half while playing strong safety. He was switched to cornerback in the second half and intercepted another pass. He returned one of the interceptions 38 yards for a touchdown. The Associated Press named him AFL Defensive Player of the Week. In a November 5 win over the Miami Dolphins, Janik intercepted a pass thrown by future Hall of Fame quarterback Bob Griese and returned it 18 yards for a touchdown. He was selected to the play in the AFL-All Star Game after the 1967 season.

Janik started 11 games in 1968, at both free and strong safety; with three interceptions and one quarterback sack. On September 29, 1968, Janik had one of the biggest games of his career, against the New York Jets in Buffalo. Janik had two interceptions against future Hall of Fame Jets' quarterback Joe Namath, including an interception he returned 100 yards for a touchdown that turned the game in the Bills' favor. For the third consecutive year, the Associated Press named Janik the AFL's Defensive Player of the Week. The 100-yard return set the Bills' record for longest interception return.

Overall, the Bills had five interceptions against Namath in that game, with three being returned for touchdowns. In addition to Janik's 100-yard return, Butch Byrd and Booker Edgerson had 53- and 45-yard yard touchdown returns on interceptions, within five plays of each other in the fourth quarter, giving Buffalo a 37–21 lead. Namath led two scoring drives for touchdowns in response, totalling four touchdown passes on the day; but the Bills won the close and exciting game 37–35. Byrd had another interception return for a touchdown negated by a Bills' offside penalty. This was Buffalo's only win during a 1–12–1 season. The Jets went on to finish 11–3, and won the AFL title before going on to defeat the Colts in Super Bowl III.

In four years with the Bills, Janik started 32 games, with 21 interceptions, five of which he returned for touchdowns.

=== Boston/New England Patriots ===
On August 27, 1969, he was traded to the Boston Patriots. He became a reserve defensive back and starting punter for the Patriots in 1969. He started one game at defensive back, with one interception in 1969. He punted 70 times, with a 41.5 yards per punt average. He played two seasons with the Patriots after the 1970 AFL/NFL merger (1970–71), the final season with the renamed New England Patriots. In 1970, he punted 86 times, with a 39.1 average, and did not start any games on defense. In 1971, his final playing season, Janik started two games at defensive back. He punted 86 times, with a 37.3 yards per punt average. In April 1972, he retired. In three years with the Patriots, he started three games with one interception, and punted 243 times, with a 39.2 yards per punt average.

Over his nine-year career, he started 49 games as a defensive back, with 25 interceptions and six touchdown returns, along with two quarterback sacks.

== Legacy and honors ==
When Janik retired after the 1971 season, he had the fourth most interception returns for touchdowns in AFL/NFL history, and is tied for 21st through the 2025 season. At the time of his death in 2009, he was third in Buffalo Bills' history with 495 interception return yards, behind Butch Byrd and Tony Greene. He also was 11th in Bills history at that time with 21 interceptions. Through 2023, he was tied for most interceptions returned for touchdowns as a Buffalo Bill with Butch Byrd and Nate Clements.

Buffalo Bills head coach Joe Collier said "Janik is an offensive player on defense . . . He breaks up ball games. He's not a crushing tackler, but he is so quick and gets into a play so fast that the runner or pass receiver doesn't have a chance to make his move".

He was inducted to the Texas A&I Hall of Fame in 1982.

== Personal life ==
Janik's brother Jerry Janik was an All-America linebacker with the Javelinas in the mid-1960s.

Janik died on November 21, 2009, aged 69, in Poth.

== See also ==
- List of American Football League players
