= List of fatal accidents in motorboat racing =

As motorboat racing is a dangerous sport, many individuals (including drivers, crew members, officials and spectators) have been killed in crashes related to the sport, either in a race, in qualifying, in practice or a private testing session. For example, in offshore powerboat racing, one racer dies each year from accidents. Although a push for safety in recent years has led to the decrease in deaths and serious injuries as closed cockpits, safety cells and harnesses more common in automobile racing have become more common among the top and fastest classes.

== Fatal Accidents during Water speed record ==
Name	Date	Place	Boat Spec.	Comment
(United Kingdom) Henry Segrave	1930-06-13	Windermere (United Kingdom)	Miss England II	Driver
(United Kingdom) Vic Halliwell	1930-06-13	Windermere (United Kingdom)	Miss England II	Riding engineer
(United Kingdom) John Cobb	1952-09-29	Loch Ness (United Kingdom)	Crusader	
(Italy) Mario Verga	1954-10-09	Lago d'Iseo (Italy)	Laura 3	
(United Kingdom) Donald Campbell	1967-01-04	Coniston Water (United Kingdom)	Bluebird K7	
(United States) Lee Taylor	1980-11-13	Lake Tahoe (United States)	Discovery II	Test run
(United States) Craig Arfons	1989-07-09	Lake Jackson (United States)	Rain X Challenger	

== Fatal Accidents during an Unlimited Hydroplane race ==
Name	Date	Race	Place	Boat Spec.	Comment
(New Jersey) Bill Freitag	1931/09/19	President's Cup	Potomac River	Miss Philadelphia	
(Michigan) Joe Schaeffer	1939/08/28	Test run	Detroit River	Delphine IX	
(Oregon) Orth Mathiot	1951/08/04	Gold Cup	Lake Washington	Quicksilver	Driver
(Oregon) Thompson "Thom" Whitaker	1951/08/04	Gold Cup	Lake Washington	Quicksilver	Co-pilot/mechanic
(Michigan) Lloyd Maddock	1955/06/25	Detroit Memorial Regatta	Detroit River	Holiday	
(Italy) Ezio Selva	1957/12/29	Orange Bowl Regatta Grand Prix	Biscayne Bay	Moschettiere	
(Ontario) Bob Hayward	1961/09/10	Silver Cup	Detroit River	Miss Supertest	
(Ohio) Ron Musson	1966/06/19	President's Cup	Potomac River	Miss Bardahl	Explosion during race
(Washington (state)) Rex Manchester	1966/06/19	President's Cup	Potomac River	Notre Dame	Collision during final heat
(Washington (state)) Don Wilson	1966/06/19	President's Cup	Potomac River	Miss Budweiser	Collision during final heat
(Virginia) Chuck Thompson	1966/07/03	Gold Cup	Detroit River	Smirnoff	
(Washington (state)) Bill Brow	1967/11/06	Tampa Suncoast Cup	Tampa Bay	Miss Budweiser	
(Idaho) Warner Gardner	1968/09/08	Gold Cup	Detroit River	Miss Eagle Electric	
(Washington (state)) Tommy Fults	1970/09/16	Gold Cup	Mission Bay	Pay 'n Pak's 'lil Buzzard	Qualifying run
(Ohio) Skipp Walther	1974/06/02	Champion Spark Plug Trophy	Miami Marine Stadium	Red Man	Test run prior to race
(Washington (state)) Jerry Bangs	1977/08/07	Seafair Trophy	Lake Washington	The Squire	
(California) Bill Muncey	1981/10/18	UIM World Championship race	Acapulco	Atlas Van Lines	
(Florida) Dean Chenoweth	1982/07/31	Columbia Cup	Columbia River	Miss Budweiser	
(California) George Stratton	2000/09/17	Bayfair	Mission Bay	Appian Jeronimo	During a practice session on race day.

== Fatal Accidents during offshore powerboat racing ==
Name	Role	Date	Series	Race	Place	Boat Spec	Comment
Val Carr		1972/03/26		Schwepps 80	Port Jackson, Sydney, Australia		
Paul Carr		1972/03/26		Schwepps 80	Port Jackson, Sydney, Australia		
Alf Bontoft	Driver	1976/08/29		Cowes-Torquay		Enfield Marine "Blitz"	
Joel Halpern	Driver	1981/03/29	APBA	Halter 200	Lake Pontchartrain, New Orleans	Michelob Light	
Robert Weir	Driver	1984/01/29	Australian Power Boat Association	Port Phillip 100	Sandringham, Victoria, Australia	"Weirwolf" a 23 ft Whitehorse powered by 2 x 175 hp Mercury outboards.	Boat nose dived into a wave and broke in half. Co-driver Michael Meeng escaped uninjured.
Dick Fullam	driver	1985	APBA		Key West	Still Crazy	Fullam had a previous career as a CFL player
Mike Poppa	Throttleman	1985	APBA		Key West	Still Crazy	Fullam had a previous career as a CFL player
Mark Lavin	Throttleman	1986	APBA		Marathon Fl., Seven Mile Bridge	Jesse James	
Didier Pironi	Driver	1987/08/23	Offshore World Championship	Needles Trophy	Isle of Wight, United Kingdom	ACX "Colibri" - Lamborghini	Pironi was previously a Formula One racing driver for Ferrari. He retired from racing cars due to injuries sustained in an accident at the 1982 German Grand Prix.
Jean-Claude Guénard	Throttleman	1987/08/23	Offshore World Championship	Needles Trophy	Isle of Wight, United Kingdom	ACX "Colibri" - Lamborghini	Pironi was previously a Formula One racing driver for Ferrari. He retired from racing cars due to injuries sustained in an accident at the 1982 German Grand Prix.
Bernard Giroux	Navigator	1987/08/23	Offshore World Championship	Needles Trophy	Isle of Wight, United Kingdom	ACX "Colibri" - Lamborghini	Pironi was previously a Formula One racing driver for Ferrari. He retired from racing cars due to injuries sustained in an accident at the 1982 German Grand Prix.
Thomas Brandt	pilot	1988	APBA	Sheffield Oil Unocal 76 Offshore Classic	Panama City, Florida	Spirit of Miss Liberty	
Don Wright	throttleman	1988	APBA	Sheffield Oil Unocal 76 Offshore Classic	Panama City, Florida	Spirit of Miss Liberty	
Kevin Brown	Owner/Driver	1989/10/23	APBA/UIM Worlds Championship	Atlantic City, New Jersey	32 ft Skater	Team Skater UIM II (Modified Class)Jim Dyke throttle-Man Kevin Brown Owner/Driver	
Stefano Casiraghi	Throttleman	1990/10/03	Class 1 WOC	Monaco	French Riviera	Pinot di Pinot	
Shannon Pearce	Driver	1990		Cock of the Mersey - Devonport Apex Regatta	Mersey River, Latrobe, Tasmania, Australia		
Brass Wilcockson	Navigator	1991		Class 3D National Championship	Allhallows, River Thames, United Kingdom	Puma Catamaran	
Hamed Buhaleeba	Throttleman	1995/08/25	Class Two World Offshore Championship		Cowes, Isle of Wight, United Kingdom	Victory M-1-Sterling Chevrolet V6	
Khalid Al-Sabah		1997/03/30	Class Two Middle-East Offshore Championship		Abu Dhabi, United Arab Emirates		
Jack Carmody	Driver	2001	APBA Offshore Pro Series		Corpus Christi, Texas	Xtreme Carlos N'Charlie's	
Sergio Carpentieri	Throttleman	June 30, 2007	Powerboat P1 World Championship		Travemünde, Germany	Carpenter	
Kevin Graff	Driver	August 24, 2008	OPA	Battle on the Bay	Patchogue, New York	"Aero Express" MTI	
Phil DeJana	Throttleman	August 24, 2008	OPA	Battle on the Bay	Patchogue, New York	"Aero Express" MTI	
Joey Gratton	Throttleman	2011/11/11	Superboat International	31st Annual World Championships	Key West, Florida	Page Motor Sports	
Mohammad Al Mehairi	Driver	2009/12/11	Class One World Offshore Championship	Dubai	Dubai International Marine Club (DIMC), Mina Seyahi	Victory 1	
Jean-Marc Sanchez	Throttleman	2009/12/11	Class One World Offshore Championship	Dubai	Dubai International Marine Club (DIMC), Mina Seyahi	Victory 1	
William Nocker	Driver	2012/07/13	UIM Class-1	Gabon Grand Prix	Libreville, Gabon	Welmax	
Mike Fiore	Throttleman	2014/08/19	Lake Ozarks Shootout Unsanctioned Race	2014 Lake Ozarks Shootout	Lake Ozark, Missouri, USA	"Outerlimits" Catamaran Offshore Powerboat	During a run on the 23rd of August, Outerlimits clocked a speed upwards of 179 MPH/288 KPH before the boat lifted upwards. Mike tried to let off the throttle, but it was too late as the bottom of the boat had become a wing, lifting and flipping the boat upside down, until the nose hit the water. This redirected the boat the other direction, corkscrewing due to the high speeds until it hit the water cockpit first. Both the driver and the throttleman escaped under their own abilities, but the throttleman was already injured on the scene. He would pass away the Tuesday after the race due to complications. The race was an "outlaw" race, as races to 2023 were unsanctioned. Starting in 2024, the event is an APBA/UIM sanctioned event.

== Fatal Accidents during outboard powerboat racing ==
Name	Date	Series	Race	Place	Machine
(Italy) Cesare Scotti	1974/10/06	ON (2000 cc)	Six Hours of Paris	Seine River	Scotti - Evinrude
(United Kingdom) Peter Inward	1983/07/03	British F2 Powerboat Championship		Fairford	Hodges / Mercury
(United States) Ken Stevenson	1983/12/11	Formula 2 Powerboat World Championship	Nassau-Paradise Island Strait	Bahamas	
(Italy) Luigi Valdano	1984/05/27	Formula 1 Powerboat World Championship	Grote Prijs van Nederland	Ertveld Plas, 's-Hertogenbosch, Netherlands	
(France) Gérard Barthelemy	1984/06/02	Formula 1 Powerboat World Championship	Paris Grand Prix	Seine River, Paris, France	Hodges - Evinrude
(Italy) Roberto Saviero	1984/08/03	Formula 1 Powerboat World Championship	Private test	Po River, near Piacenza, Italy	"Esercito Italiano" Molinari - Evinrude
(United Kingdom) Tom Percival	1984/08/19	Formula 1 Powerboat World Championship	Grand Prix de Belgique Benson & Hedges	Meuse River, Liège, Belgium	Hodges - Evinrude
(France) Philippe Rebulet	1988/11/06		Six Hours of Paris	Seine River	?
(France) François Salabert	1990/06/10	Formula 1 Powerboat World Championship	Embassy Grand Prix	Bristol, United Kingdom	Jeanneau / Mercury
(Poland) Bolesław Niklewski	1991/07/03		Malta Circuit, Poznań	Poland	
(United Kingdom) John Hill	1993/04/16	Formula 1 Powerboat World Championship		Abu Dhabi, United Arab Emirates	Burgess / Mercury
(France) Roger Demares	1995/05/02		24 heures Motonautiques de Rouen	Seine River	Deboos / Mercury
(United Kingdom) Andy Chesman	1998/07/19	European Formula 500 Championship		Hamburg, Germany	Fort Boat / König
(France) Francis Maré	1999/05/01		24 heures Motonautiques de Rouen	Seine River	Heart attack
(Poland) Mirosław Kędziora	2001/09/23	S-550 World Championship	Trzcianka	Poland	
(Russia) Victor Kunitch	2001/10/28	Formula 1 Powerboat World Championship	Abu Dhabi	United Arab Emirates	
(Italy) Vincenzo Polli	2002/12/21	Formula 1 Powerboat World Championship	Abu Dhabi	United Arab Emirates	
Mike Lovell (GBR)	2012/09/16	P1 Superstock Series	Weymouth	United Kingdom	Peters & May - P1 Panther 250 UK

== Fatal Accidents during kyōtei racing ==
Whilst being the 2nd from last with the highest number of fatal accidents of the four parimutuel betting sports in Japan, (Note: 50 in track cycling (including 48 accounted as reported by Sports Nippon in 2008), 96 in paved flat track motorcycle racing and 17 in horse racing - figures as of the last fatal accident in 2022.) 34 drivers (including one trainee) have lost their lives since the first death in 1953. This is caused by collisions with the quay or one of the competing boats. It is estimated that there is one death for every 2 years.

Kyōtei boats, which are similar to C Stock Hydro (APBA) or OSY 400 (UIM) in specifications worldwide, do not feature seat belts, safety capsules, or other forms of required safety devices such as flotation devices and oxygen masks, which are required in most powerboat classes (offshore, F1H20, H1 Unlimited) after a series of early 1980's Unlimited Hydroplane fatalities.

Name	Rank		Date	Race	Start	Grade	Venue	Ref.
Atsuko Kimura			2003/5/25	7th at Tsu			Tsu	
Yasutaka Nakajima	B1		2004/3/28	5th at Amagasaki	2		Amagasaki	
Shinji Sakatani		26	2007/2/26	50th Taiko Sho	5	G1	Suminoe	
Takahiro Iwanaga			2010/5/14				Wakamatsu	
Shoko Suzuki	B1	52	2013/11/2	test session			Shimonoseki	
Yuzu Mizushiro	n/a	19	19/5/2016	training session		n/a	Kyōtei Training School	
Katsuya Matsumoto	A1	48	2020/2/9	9th at 63rd Kinki District Championship	6	G1	Amagasaki	
Susumu Kobayashi	B1		12/1/2022	BOATBoyCUP			Tamagawa	
Tatsuya Nakata	A2		6/11/2022	10th at Miyajima			Miyajima	

== Fatal Accidents during hydroplane and displacement racing ==
Name	Date	Competition	Race	Place	Boat Spec.	Comment
Jack Cooper	1948/08/23	Canadian Gold Cup		Picton, Ontario	Ventnor "Tops III"	
Dennis Hall	1989/01/15	Unlimited Unrestricted race		Deepwater Motor Boat Club, Milperra	6 Litre Displacement "CAINAM"	As 2 boats were approaching a turn buoy, Mr Hall's boat turned from the outside & was run over by another boat from the inside which did not turn & Mr Hall was fatally injured.
Doug Jancura	2004/04/17	American Power Boat Association	Testing	American Lake, Lakewood, Washington, USA	Strutin PS 1 - Pro Stock Flatbottom Sprint Boat	
Larry Martin	2004/11/06	Australian Power Boat Association	Wide Bay Bundy Thunder	Bundaberg, Queensland, Australia	Trojan - 6 litre Displacement	
Geoff Tomkins	2007/03/04	Devonport Apex Regatta	Cock of the Mersey	Mersey River, Latrobe, Tasmania, Australia	"Iron Nuts" - Unlimited Displacement	
János Feil	2008/05/11	UIM	European Championship F350	Po River, Boretto, Italy		
Brian McCosker	2010/04/03	Taree Aquatic Power Boat Club Easter Classic	Stuart Doyle Cup - NSW Unlimited Displacement Championship	Taree, New South Wales, Australia	Liberty - Unlimited Displacement	
David Bryant	2010/04/04	Taree Aquatic Power Boat Club Easter Classic	Eastway Shield - NSW Unlimited Open Inboard Championship	Taree, New South Wales, Australia	She's the Culprit - Unlimited Displacement	
John Cross	2010/09/28	Australian Power Boat Association	Lake Mulwala Power, Victorian Council APBA	Yarrawonga, Victoria, Australia	Rival - Unlimited Displacement	Mr Cross had just passed the finish line in a final race when a propeller ear broke causing the boat to flip
Ryan Butler	2011/07/09	American Power Boat Association	UIM World Flatbottom Championships	Black Lake, Olympia, Washington, USA	Scooty-Puff. Sr. PS 44 - Super Stock Flatbottom Sprint Boat	
Raivo Peetsmann	2014/06/29	UIM World Championships	OSY-400	Chodzież, Poland	Põvvat-Yamato	At 11:20 AM, the third heat of OSY-400, a formula similar to kyōtei in Japan, started. On the third lap, Peetsmann's boat spun, creating a small wave. The boat of University of Massachusetts, Lowell student Michael Akerstrom hit that wave and was launched against the top of the Estonian’s boat, which was then crossing the usual racing path. The impact was violent, and threw both competitors in the water. The race was red-flagged. Peetsmann's helmet was hit by the propeller of Akerstrom's boat. Peetsmann was sent to Chodzież District Hospital, where he died that night of cardiac arrest. The third heat was abandoned, and the fourth heat was cancelled.
Greg Duff	2018/08/15	SCSC	Long Beach Sprint Nationals	Long Beach Marine Stadium,	Dark Horse Racing Ps640	As of media reports, Greg was racing in the superstock class when he was struck in a T-Bone style accident.
Jay Hart	2021/8/8	SCSC	Long Beach Sprint Nationals	Long Beach Marine Stadium,	K class race boat, Open cockpit K16	On the backstretch of the First lap of the Sunday Race, Jay had been side by side for the lead, tragically being caught in the wake of the other driver, Corkscrewing, and throwing him into the water at over 100 MPH, The event was later cancelled for investigation.

== Fatal Accidents during drag boat racing ==
Name	Date	Competition	Water	Place	Boat Spec.	Notes	Ref.
Hugh Jones	1986/06/21	ADBA	Molson Drag Boat Challenge	London, Ontario	BFH Stage fright		
Mac Bale	1970/02/01		Lake Ming	Bakersfield, California, United States			
Jan Barrett	1973/10/07			Lake Ming, Bakersfield, California, United States		Water speed record attempt	
Alan Hawkins	2000/06/17		Lake Ming	Bakersfield, California, United States	"Gladiator" blown alcohol hydro		
Melvin Eaves	2001/07/01	Alabama River Rampage		Alabama River			
Lance Faulkner	2001/11/22	Testing	Lake Mead	Parker, Arizona			
Dale Anderson	2002/09/08	National Jet Boat Association	Lake Ming	Bakersfield, California, United States	"Bad Boy's Dixie Toy"		
Joe Barnes	2004/08/28	Kentucky Drag Boat Association 9th annual "Thunder on the Green" race		Green River, Livermore, Kentucky			
John Hipwell	2004/10/03	International Hot Boat Association race		Lake Yosemite, Merced, California	"Madness" top fuel hydro		
Mike Neuharth	2005/04/09	International Hot Boat Association Lakefest		Firebird Lake, Phoenix, Arizona	"Silver Belle" Pro Mod		
David Skalicky	2005/07/10	Southern Drag Boat Association	Ozarka Bricktown Nationals	Bricktown Drag Boat Circuit, Oklahoma City, Oklahoma, United States			
Jay Wallace	2006/05/06	Event: National Jet Boat Association May Shootout race		Lake Ming, near Bakersfield, California			
Charlie Hodsdon	2006/10/15			Lake Ming, near Bakersfield, California	"White Thunder" River Races jet boat		
Lloyd Burns	2007/04/21	Kentucky Drag Boat Association		Kentucky Lake's Pisgah Bay			
Stephen Rawleigh	2008/09/28			Lake Ming, near Bakersfield, California	19-foot Chevy-powered flatbottom		
Jim Tucker	2009/06/20	30th annual Budweiser Creve Coeur Lake Drag Boat Classic		Mission Burial Park South, San Antonio, Texas	"Say When"		
Don Ermshar	2009/08/27	Southern Drag Boat Association Cowtown Drag Boat Nationals		Marine Creek Lake, North Fort Worth, Texas			
John Haas	2010/08/07	Southern Drag Boat Association Mid-America Summer Nationals	Grand River, near Chouteau, Oklahoma	"Speed Sport Special" top fuel hydro			
Mike Fry	2015/08/09	Marble Falls Lakefest	Lucas Oil Drag Boat Racing Series	Lake Marble Falls (Texas)	Top Alcohol Hydro "Meanstreak II"	First round of eliminations in TA/H	
Wade Stanley	2016/02/13	Arizona Drag Boat Association "Southwest Showdown 5"		Colorado River, Parker, Arizona			
