= Bob Paremore =

American gridiron football player (1939–2004)

- Paremore in 1963

No. 23, 32, 34, 31
- Position: Halfback

Personal information
- Born: December 5, 1939; Tallahassee, Florida, U.S.
- Died: July 22, 2004 (aged 64); Tallahassee, Florida, U.S.
- Listed height: 5 ft 11 in (1.80 m)
- Listed weight: 190 lb (86 kg)

Career information
- High school: Lincoln (FL)
- College: Florida A&M
- NFL draft: 1963: 6th round, 73rd overall pick
- AFL draft: 1963: 17th round, 133rd overall pick

Career history
- St. Louis Cardinals (1963–1964); Atlanta Falcons (1965)*; Florida Brahmans (1965); Montreal Alouettes (1966); Calgary Stampeders (1967–1968)
- * Offseason or practice squad member only

Career NFL statistics
- Rushing yards: 107
- Rushing average: 3
- Receptions: 6
- Receiving yards: 89
- Total touchdowns: 2
- Stats at Pro Football Reference

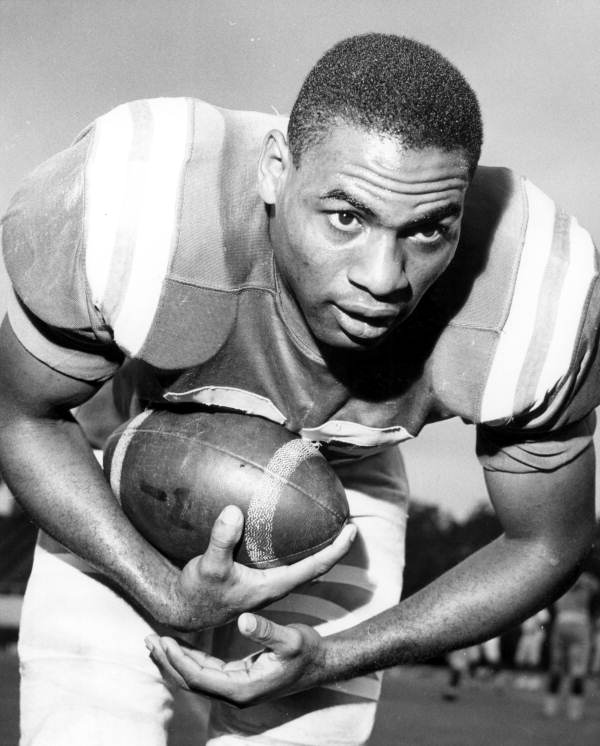
FAMU halfback Robert Paremore holding a football - Tallahassee, Florida

Robert Cero Paremore (December 5, 1938 or 1939 – July 22, 2004) was an American football halfback who played college football for Florida A&M and professional football for the St. Louis Cardinals (1963–1964), Montreal Alouettes (1966), and Calgary Stampeders (1967–1968).

== Early life ==
A native of Tallahassee, Florida, he attended Lincoln High School in Tallahassee and Florida A&M University. He earned seven varsity letters at Florida A&M, four in football and three in track. He was clocked in the 100-yard dash at 9.3 seconds. He played college football as a halfback at Florida A&M from 1959 to 1962. He was given the nickname "China Doll" due to his frail condition after being born prematurely. While attending Florida A&M, he played in the backfield with Bob Hayes, forming "one of the fastest duos in college football." He scored 11 touchdowns in 1961 and 10 in 1962 while averaging 6.5 yards per carry.

After the 1962 season, he became the first African-American player to play for the South in the annual North-South College All-Star Game. At the time of his selection, Paremore said: "This is the biggest thrill of my life -- being the first of my race to play for the South." He also received Little-All-America honors in 1962.

== Professional football ==
He was drafted in the sixth round by the St. Louis Cardinals with the 73rd overall pick in the 1963 NFL draft. He signed a contract with the Cardinals in January 1963. He played for the Cardinals during the 1963 and 1964 seasons, appearing in 18 NFL games.

In September 1965, he signed a contract with the newly-formed Atlanta Falcons franchise. He was the first player signed by the Falcons. As the Falcons did not commence play until 1966, Paremore played minor league ball in the fall of 1965 for the Lakeland Brahmans.

Paremore never appeared in a regular season game for the Falcons. In August 1966, he joined the Montreal Alouettes of the Canadian Football League. He appeared in 12 games for the Alouettes in 1966. He tallied 649 rushing yards and three touchdowns for the Alouettes in 1966.

In February 1967, Paremore was traded by the Alouettes to the Calgary Stampeders. He appeared in 21 games for the Stampeders during the 1967 and 1968 seasons. He had 14 receptions for 341 yards for the Stampeders in 1967.

== Later life ==
After retiring from football, Paremore became a physical education teacher and coach (football and track) at Amos P. Godby High School in Tallahassee. He also developed his grandfather's property in Tallahassee into a subdivision known as Paremore Estates. He was inducted into the Florida A&M Sports Hall of Fame in 1981. He died in 2004 in Tallahassee.
