= Frank Atkinson =

Frank Atkinson may refer to:

- Frank Atkinson (American football) (born 1941), American football defensive lineman
- Frank Atkinson (actor) (1893–1963), British actor and writer
- Frank Atkinson (museum director) (1924–2014), British museum director and curator
- R. Frank Atkinson (1869–1923), British architect

== See also ==
- Frank Attkisson (1955–2017), Florida politician
