= 1962 Little All-America college football team =

American college football all-star team

The 1962 Little All-America college football team is composed of college football players from small colleges and universities who were selected by the Associated Press (AP) as the best players at each position. For 1962, the AP selected three teams of 11 players each, with no separate defensive platoons.

Tackle Buck Buchanan of Grambling was the largest player at 6'6" and 272 pounds; he was the No. 1 pick in the 1963 AFL draft. Buchanan played 13 seasons for the Kansas City Chiefs and was inducted into the Pro Football Hall of Fame.

Quarterback George Bork of Northern Illinois was the only junior. He was the first college player to pass for 3,000 yards in a season and was later inducted into the College Football Hall of Fame.

End Drew Roberts of Humboldt State and back Joe Iacone of West Chester were the only repeaters on the first team from 1961. Iacone rushed for 1,486 yards in 1962.

== First team ==
| Position | Player | Team |
|---|---|---|
| B | Joe Iacone | West Chester |
| B | George Bork | Northern Illinois |
| B | Richard Kemp | Lenoir–Rhyne |
| B | Robert Paremore | Florida A&M |
| E | Willie Richardson | Jackson State |
| E | Drew Roberts | Humboldt State |
| T | Buck Buchanan | Grambling |
| T | Richard Peter | Whittier |
| G | Ralph Soffredine | Central Michigan |
| G | Don Hunt | Wittenberg |
| C | Douglas Harvey | Texas A&I |

== Second team ==
| Position | Player | Team |
|---|---|---|
| B | Jerry Linton | Panhandle A&M |
| B | Nat Craddock | Parsons |
| B | Jimmy Baker | East Tennessee State |
| B | Ron Deveaux | Tufts |
| E | Jan Barrett | Fresno State |
| E | Howard Hartman | Southern Oregon |
| T | Paul Chesmore | Delaware |
| T | Richard Koblin | John Carroll |
| G | Wayne Farmer | Chattanooga |
| G | Harold Gray | Los Angeles State |
| C | Harold Hays | Southern Miss |

== Third team ==
| Position | Player | Team |
|---|---|---|
| B | John Murlo | Whitworth |
| B | Dan Boals | State College of Iowa |
| B | Larry Kerstetter | Susquehanna |
| B | Bobby Hidalgo | Adams State |
| E | Buddy Bozeman | Howard (AL) |
| E | Paul Blazevich | Omaha |
| T | Kindley King | Lamar Tech |
| T | John Contoulis | Connecticut |
| G | William Bryant | Emory & Henry |
| G | Jim Edmiston | Lenoir–Rhyne |
| C | J. R. Williams | Fresno State |

== See also ==
- 1962 College Football All-America Team
