= Poth Independent School District =

School district in Texas, United States

Poth Independent School District is a public school district based in Poth, Texas, that serves students in south central Wilson County

The district's colors are navy blue, white, and gold and its mascot is a Pirate named "Pirate Steve".

In 2009, the school district was rated "recognized" by the Texas Education Agency.

== Schools ==
Superintendent is Paula Renken

- Poth High School (grades 9–12) principal is Todd Deaver
- Poth Junior High School (grades 6–8) principal is Laura Kroll
- Poth Elementary School (grades PK–5) principal is Laura Kroll

== UIL ==
The school is officially a 3A, according to the University Interscholastic League. All sports and other competitions are part of UIL.
