= Terry Baker =

American football and basketball player (born 1941)

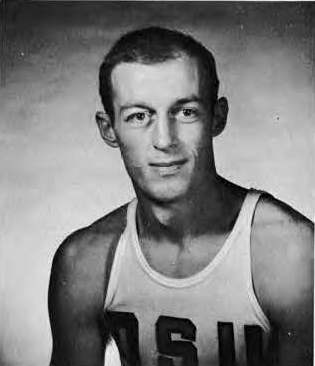
- Baker at Oregon State c. 1963

No. 15, 11, 12
- Positions: Quarterback, halfback, wide receiver

Personal information
- Born: May 5, 1941 (age 85); Pine River, Minnesota, U.S.
- Listed height: 6 ft 3 in (1.91 m)
- Listed weight: 200 lb (91 kg)

Career information
- High school: Jefferson (Portland, Oregon)
- College: Oregon State (1960–1962)
- NFL draft: 1963: 1st round, 1st overall pick
- AFL draft: 1963: 12th round, 90th overall pick

Career history
- Los Angeles Rams (1963–1965); Edmonton Eskimos (1967)

Awards and highlights
- Heisman Trophy (1962); Maxwell Award (1962); UPI Player of the Year (1962); SN Player of the Year (1962); Pop Warner Trophy (1962); SI Sportsman of the Year (1962); Chic Harley Award (1962); Unanimous All-American (1962); 3× First-team All-PCC (1960, 1961, 1962); Oregon Sports Hall of Fame; Oregon State Beavers No. 11 retired

Career NFL statistics
- Passing attempts: 21
- Passing completions: 12
- Completion percentage: 57.1%
- TD–INT: 0–4
- Passing yards: 154
- Passer rating: 40.7
- Receiving yards: 302
- Receiving touchdowns: 2
- Stats at Pro Football Reference

Career CFL statistics
- Passing attempts: 36
- Passing completions: 23
- Completion percentage: 63.9%
- TD–INT: 1–2
- Passing yards: 344
- Passer rating: 81.2
- Rushing yards: 120
- Rushing touchdowns: 1
- College Football Hall of Fame

Terry Wayne Baker (born May 5, 1941) is an American former professional football player who was a quarterback, halfback, and wide receiver in the National Football League (NFL) and Canadian Football League (CFL). He played college football and basketball at Oregon State University, where he was a member and president of Phi Delta Theta. Baker played for the Oregon State Beavers football team from 1960 to 1962, winning the Heisman Trophy as a senior. In the spring of his senior year, he led the basketball team to the 1963 Final Four. To date, he is the only athlete to win a Heisman Trophy and play in the Final Four.

Baker was the first overall pick in the 1963 NFL draft and played with the Los Angeles Rams from 1963 to 1965. He then played for one season in the CFL with the Edmonton Eskimos in 1967. Baker was inducted into the College Football Hall of Fame in 1982 and the National High School Hall of Fame in 2006.

== Early life and education ==
Terry Baker was born May 5, 1941, in Pine River, Minnesota, and raised in Portland, Oregon. He attended Jefferson High School, where he was a standout three-sport athlete. Baker was a three-year letter winner in basketball, and led the Democrats to the Portland Interscholastic League city championship his senior year. Baker was also a great baseball player; he lettered all four years and led Jefferson to the 1959 Oregon state championship.

Football was Baker's most dominant sport and he played quarterback and tailback for the Democrats. In his junior and senior seasons, the Democrats were 23–0 and won consecutive Oregon state championships. As a senior, he threw for 1,261 yards and ran for 438 yards.

== College career ==
Baker played point guard on the Oregon State basketball team, and quarterback in football, but was a halfback as a sophomore in 1960. He threw for 3,476 yards and 23 touchdowns and rushing for 1503 yards and 15 touchdowns, and graduated with a Bachelor of Science in mechanical engineering in 1963.

On November 27, 1962, Baker won the Heisman Trophy for his achievements during the 1962 season. In addition to winning the Heisman, he also won the Maxwell Award and the W. J. Voit Memorial Trophy in 1962, was a consensus first team All-American, was named as the Sports Illustrated Sportsman of the Year, was a Helms Foundation Award recipient and won 14 player of the year awards, including from AP, UPI and The Sporting News. He also played in the College All-Star Game in Chicago on August 2, 1963, the last time the collegiate stars defeated the reigning NFL champion.

Baker's 99-yard run in the first quarter against Villanova in the frigid Liberty Bowl (in Philadelphia in mid-December 1962), the only score in Oregon State's 6–0 victory, remains an NCAA record. Because plays from scrimmage can never start from the goal line, the record can never be broken, only tied.

== Professional career ==
Baker was the first overall pick in the 1963 NFL draft, taken by the Los Angeles Rams. He was also the ninetieth pick of the AFL draft in the twelfth round by the San Diego Chargers. The Rams had drafted Roman Gabriel in 1962 and had Zeke Bratkowski on the roster as well.

Before going into training camp with the Rams, he led the College All-Stars to victory in the Chicago College All-Star Game that matched them against the defending NFL champion (Green Bay Packers), the last time the college team would beat an NFL team before the game was discontinued in 1976. When Baker arrived in camp, he dazzled in the presentation of calling out signals and handing the ball out while doing soft throws for warm-up lobs. However, as camp went on, it was discovered that he did not have a strong arm to throw the ball hard more than a general lob, as his arm was used to rolling out to throw in college, rather than throwing a straight pass from the pocket. The result was that while he could throw short passes capably, his long passes were susceptible to being intercepted due to low velocity.

In a game against the Detroit Lions, Baker threw three interceptions, with one returned for a touchdown. He went 6-of-12 for 72 yards while rushing four times for 21 yards in a 23–2 loss. Four games later, he went 5-of-7 for 68 yards with one interception versus the Chicago Cardinals while running five times for 25 yards. These were his only two games where he served as a primary quarterback (aside from two games where he threw one pass).

Baker was converted to running back by the Rams in 1964.

He scored his only touchdowns in his final season of 1965. He would also play more as a receiver during 1965. Baker caught 8 passes for 82 yards against the Chicago Bears on September 26; he caught a ten-yard pass from Bill Munson in the fourth quarter that served as the go-ahead points in a 30–28 win. The next week against the Minnesota Vikings, Baker caught a 38-yard pass from Roman Gabriel in the first quarter, but the Rams lost 38-35 while he caught four passes for 61 yards. He scored his last touchdown on October 17, 1965, rushing the ball one yard in his only carry against the San Francisco 49ers in a loss.

In total, Baker passed for 154 yards, rushed 58 times for 210 yards, and had thirty catches for 302 yards in three seasons with the Rams as quarterback-turned-halfback-turned-receiver before he was released in the summer of 1966. He went to the Edmonton Eskimos of the Canadian Football League (CFL), while earning a J.D. at the University of Southern California Law School, studying at night during football season and full-time in the offseason. He played quarterback, halfback, and wide receiver with the Eskimos, but played sparingly. A pulled muscle in the groin, alongside a dispute about a contract while he tried to take the bar exam in Oregon, led to the end of his professional football career. Baker would then return to Portland, where he was a founding partner at the law firm Tonkon Torp.

== Later life ==
Baker was inducted into the State of Oregon Sports Hall of Fame in 1980, the College Football Hall of Fame in 1982 and the Oregon State University Sports Hall of Fame in 1988. Oregon State has retired his No. 11 football jersey, the only number retired by the football team.

== See also ==
- List of NCAA major college football yearly total offense leaders
