= Tonkon Torp =

Oregon law firm

Tonkon Torp LLP
- Headquarters: Portland, Oregon; 45.5173°N 122.6781°W
- No. of attorneys: 78 (2017)
- Key people: Anna Sortun (managing partner)
- Date founded: 1974
- Website: tonkon.com

Tonkon Torp LLP is an American law firm based in Portland in the U.S. state of Oregon. Established in 1974, the limited liability partnership has 78 attorneys. As of 2010, it was the third largest law firm in Portland when it had 86 attorneys.

== History ==
Originally known as Tonkon, Torp & Galen, the firm started in 1974 with attorneys who had worked for Davies, Biggs, Strayer, Stoel and Boley (today Stoel Rives). One of the founding partners was Heisman Trophy winner and Portland native Terry Baker. In 1974, three more partners left Davies Biggs to join the new firm, including Frederick H. Torp. In 1981, the firm changed its name to Tonkon, Torp, Galen, Marmaduke & Booth, which was shortened to Tonkon Torp LLP in 1997. The firm remodeled their office space in 2010 to adopt more communal spaces. Tonkon started a practice group to assist clients with the registration as benefit corporations in 2014. The firm was sued in 2016, along with other financial services and legal firms, over what led to bankruptcy of Aequitas Capital Management.

== Details ==
Tonkon Torp is housed in the Wells Fargo Center in Downtown Portland. Industries the firm services include healthcare, retail, energy, professional services, construction, and telecommunications, among others. The firm's clients include public companies, private enterprises, and individuals in the Northwest region.
