= Jimmy Burson =

American football player (1940–2022)

No. 49
- Position: Defensive back

Personal information
- Born: October 13, 1940; LaGrange, Georgia, U.S.
- Died: August 2, 2022 (aged 81); Dahlonega, Georgia, U.S.
- Listed height: 6 ft 0 in (1.83 m)
- Listed weight: 175 lb (79 kg)

Career information
- High school: LaGrange (GA)
- College: Auburn
- NFL draft: 1963: 11th round, 142nd overall pick
- AFL draft: 1963: 8th round, 63rd overall pick

Career history
- St. Louis Cardinals (1963–1967); Washington Redskins (1968)*; Atlanta Falcons (1968)
- * Offseason or practice squad member only

Career NFL statistics
- Interceptions: 16
- Fumble recoveries: 4
- Total touchdowns: 2
- Stats at Pro Football Reference

James Oertell Burson (October 13, 1940 – August 2, 2022) was an American professional football player from LaGrange, Georgia.

Burson played college football at Auburn and was selected in the eleventh round of the 1963 NFL draft by the St. Louis Cardinals. He was also selected by the Houston Oilers in the eighth round of the 1963 AFL draft.

Burson played five seasons with the Cardinals from 1963 to 1967 and intercepted 12 passes. He also returned a punt 68 yards for a touchdown against the San Francisco 49ers in 1964. He finished his NFL career in 1968 with the Atlanta Falcons.

Following his playing career, Burson remained in metro Atlanta and began coaching at the high school level. The highlight of his career was a 12-year stint as head coach at Milton High School from 1974 to 1985.

Burson died on August 2, 2022, at the age of 81.
