= Harry Butsko =

American football player (born 1941)

No. 52, 51, 62
- Position: Linebacker

Personal information
- Born: February 2, 1941 (age 85); Pottsville, Pennsylvania, U.S.
- Listed height: 6 ft 3 in (1.91 m)
- Listed weight: 225 lb (102 kg)

Career information
- College: Maryland (1960-1962)
- NFL draft: 1963: 15th round, 203rd overall pick
- AFL draft: 1963: 27th round, 210th overall pick

Career history
- Washington Redskins (1963); Hartford Charter Oaks (1965); Washington Redskins (1966)*; Wheeling Ironmen (1966)
- * Offseason or practice squad member only
- Stats at Pro Football Reference

Harry Butsko (Ukrainian: Гері Буцько) (born February 2, 1941) is an American former professional football linebacker in the National Football League (NFL) for the Washington Redskins. He played college football at the University of Maryland and was drafted by the Redskins in the 15th round of the 1963 NFL draft. Butsko was also selected in the 27th round of the 1963 AFL draft by the San Diego Chargers.
