= Bill Siekierski =

American gridiron football player (born 1942)

Profile
- Position: Tackle

Personal information
- Born: c. 1942 (age 83–84); East St. Louis, Illinois, U.S.
- Listed height: 6 ft 1 in (1.85 m)
- Listed weight: 250 lb (113 kg)

Career information
- College: Missouri
- NFL draft: 1963: 10th round, 131st overall pick

Career history
- 1963–1965: Ottawa Rough Riders

William J. Siekierski (born c. 1942) is a retired Canadian football player who played for the Ottawa Rough Riders. He played college football at University of Missouri.
