= Jan Barrett =

American football player (1939–1973)

No. 82
- Position: End

Personal information
- Born: November 13, 1939; Santa Barbara, California, U.S.
- Died: October 7, 1973 (aged 33); Bakersfield, California, U.S.
- Listed height: 6 ft 3 in (1.91 m)
- Listed weight: 226 lb (103 kg)

Career information
- High school: Santa Ynez Valley Union (Santa Ynez, California)
- College: Fresno State
- NFL draft: 1963: 6th round, 84th overall pick
- AFL draft: 1963: 9th round, 72nd overall pick

Career history
- Green Bay Packers (1963); Oakland Raiders (1963–1964)

Awards and highlights
- Second-team Little All-American (1962)

Career NFL/AFL statistics
- Receptions: 13
- Receiving yards: 221
- Touchdowns: 2
- Stats at Pro Football Reference

Jan Michael Barrett (November 13, 1939 – October 7, 1973) was an American college and professional football player. He played college football for the Fresno State Bulldogs, where he was an offensive end. He was signed by the Green Bay Packers in 1962, and played professionally in the American Football League (AFL) for the Oakland Raiders in 1963 and 1964.

Barrett was killed on Lake Ming, California, while attempting to break a drag boat world speed record. On his final run he reached a speed of 154.10 miles per hour (248.00 km/h), just short of the world record of 155 miles per hour (249 km/h).
