= Ken Reed (Canadian football) =

Canadian football player (1941–2014)

Profile
- Positions: Defensive end, Linebacker

Personal information
- Born: November 24, 1941; Poplar Bluff, Missouri, U.S.
- Died: September 5, 2014 (aged 72); Alaska Highway, British Columbia, Canada
- Listed height: 6 ft 1 in (1.85 m)
- Listed weight: 235 lb (107 kg)

Career information
- College: Tulsa
- NFL draft: 1963: 17th round, 232nd overall pick

Career history
- 1963–1964: Edmonton Eskimos
- 1965–1970: Saskatchewan Roughriders

Awards and highlights
- Grey Cup champion (1966)

Kenneth Woodrow Reed (November 24, 1941 – September 5, 2014) was an American professional Canadian football player who played as a linebacker for the Edmonton Eskimos and Saskatchewan Roughriders; he won the Grey Cup in 1966. Born in Poplar Bluff, Missouri, he was an alumnus of the University of Tulsa. Reed, 72 and his wife died in a car accident in 2014 on the Alaska Highway near Fort St. John, British Columbia.
