= Lucien Reeberg =

American football player (1942–1964)

No. 61
- Position: Offensive tackle

Personal information
- Born: February 21, 1942; Bronx, New York, U.S.
- Died: January 31, 1964 (aged 21); Detroit, Michigan, U.S.
- Listed height: 6 ft 4 in (1.93 m)
- Listed weight: 285 lb (129 kg)

Career information
- College: Hampton (1959–1962)
- NFL draft: 1963: 19th round, 264th overall pick

Career history
- Detroit Lions (1963)

Career NFL statistics
- Games played: 14
- Games started: 6
- Fumble recoveries: 2
- Stats at Pro Football Reference

Lucien Henry Reeberg (February 21, 1942 – January 31, 1964) was an American professional football offensive tackle who played one season with the Detroit Lions of the National Football League (NFL). He was selected by the Lions in the 19th round of the 1963 NFL draft. He played college football at Hampton Institute.

== Early life and college ==
Lucien Henry Reeberg was born on February 21, 1942, in the Bronx, New York. He was a member of the Hampton Pirates of Hampton Institute from 1959 to 1962.

== Professional career ==
Reeberg was selected by the Detroit Lions in the 19th round, with the 264th overall pick, of the 1963 NFL draft. He played offensive and defensive tackle for the Lions during the preseason. He lost 30 pounds after going on a crash diet ordered by Lions head coach George Wilson. Reeberg played in all 14 games, starting six, for the Lions during the 1963 season as an offensive tackle and recovered two fumbles. Wilson was listed at 6'4" and 285 pounds. Coach Wilson wanted him to drop his weight further to 250 pounds. As a result, Reeberg went to the hospital for routine tesing ahead of his planned diet. After he had blood in his urine for three days, it was discovered that he had uremic poisoning. He died at Detroit Osteopathic Hospital on January 31, 1964, of “cardiac arrest due to uremic poisoning” as he was being prepared for surgery on his kidneys. Reeberg was 21.

== See also ==
- List of gridiron football players who died during their careers
