= John Maczuzak =

American football player (1941–2013)

No. 72
- Position: Defensive tackle

Personal information
- Born: April 4, 1941; Ellsworth, Pennsylvania, U.S.
- Died: December 27, 2013 (aged 72)
- Listed height: 6 ft 5 in (1.96 m)
- Listed weight: 250 lb (113 kg)

Career information
- High school: Ellsworth (PA)
- College: Pittsburgh
- NFL draft: 1963: 9th round, 120 (by San Francisco 49ers)th overall pick
- AFL draft: 1963: 22nd round, 176 (by Kansas City Chiefs)th overall pick

Career history
- Kansas City Chiefs (1964)

Career AFL statistics
- Games played: 1
- Stats at Pro Football Reference

John Anthony Maczuzak (April 4, 1941 – December 27, 2013) was an American steel industry leader and professional football player.

Maczuzak was born in Ellsworth, Pennsylvania. He attended the University of Pittsburgh, where he was a three-year letterwinner in basketball, playing in 49 games and scoring 147 points, and lettered in football from 1961–1963. He was a standout tackle for the 1963 "No Bowl" Pitt football team that finished 9-1 and third in the national polls. After his college career, he played in the Chicago Charities College All-Star Game. Maczuzak was selected in the ninth round of the 1963 NFL draft by the San Francisco 49ers and in the 22nd round of the 1963 AFL draft by the Kansas City Chiefs. He played one season in the AFL for the Kansas City Chiefs as a defensive tackle in 1964, appearing in one game.

Maczuzak was later a steel industry leader. He was vice president of operations of U.S. Steel and president and COO of National Steel Corp. He was a Pitt Awardee of Distinction in 1992. He died in 2013, at the age of 72.
