= Nat Craddock =

American gridiron football player (born 1940)

No. 32
- Position: Fullback

Personal information
- Born: December 13, 1940 (age 85); Des Moines, Iowa, U.S.
- Listed height: 6 ft 1 in (1.85 m)
- Listed weight: 220 lb (100 kg)

Career information
- College: Parsons
- AFL draft: 1963: 22nd round, 174th overall pick

Career history
- Baltimore Colts (1963); Montreal Alouettes (1964–1965)

Awards and highlights
- Second-team Little All-American (1962)

Career NFL statistics
- Rushing yards: 1
- Stats at Pro Football Reference

Nathaniel "Crash" Craddock (born December 3, 1940) is an American former professional football player who was a fullback in the National Football League (NFL) and Canadian Football League (CFL). He played college football for the Parsons Wildcats before playing in the NFL for the Baltimore Colts during the 1963 season and in the CFL during the 1964 and 1965 seasons.

== Early life ==
A native of Des Moines, Iowa, he played college football at Parsons College in Fairfield, Iowa, from 1959 to 1962.

== Professional football ==
He played professional football for the Baltimore Colts during the 1963 season, appearing in three NFL games.

He also played in the Canadian Football League (CFL) for the Montreal Alouettes during the 1964 and 1965 seasons. He appeared in nine CFL games.

== Later life ==
After retiring from football, Craddock worked as a strength and conditioning coach at a Des Moines high school and as the intramural program coordinator at Kirkwood Community College. In 1984, he opened a Nautilus fitness center in Cedar Rapids, Iowa.
