= Robert Taylor (gridiron football) =

American gridiron football player and coach (1940–2006)

Bob Taylor
No. 65, 72, 24
- Positions: Defensive end, Defensive tackle

Personal information
- Born: February 5, 1940; Columbia, South Carolina, U.S.
- Died: June 4, 2006 (aged 66); New York, New York, U.S.
- Listed height: 6 ft 3 in (1.91 m)
- Listed weight: 240 lb (109 kg)

Career information
- High school: Lucy Craft Laney (Augusta, Georgia)
- College: Maryland Eastern Shore (1959-1962)
- NFL draft: 1963: 9th round, 125th overall pick

Career history

Playing
- New York Giants (1963–1964); Minnesota Vikings (1965)*; Winnipeg Blue Bombers (1965–1967); Toronto Argonauts (1968)
- * Offseason or practice squad member only

Coaching
- Maryland State / Eastern Shore (1969-1970) Head coach

Career NFL statistics
- Fumble recoveries: 2
- Sacks: 0.5
- Stats at Pro Football Reference

Head coaching record
- Career: 2–15–0 (.118)

Robert F. Taylor (February 5, 1940 – June 4, 2006) was an American football player and coach. He served as the head football coach at his alma mater, the University of Maryland Eastern Shore, from 1969 to 1970, compiling a record of 2–15.

Taylor was selected by the New York Giants in the ninth round of the 1963 NFL draft. He spent two seasons with the Giants before playing four more seasons in the Canadian Football League (CFL), first for the Winnipeg Blue Bombers (1965–1967) and then the Toronto Argonauts (1968).

== Head coaching record ==
Year	Team	Overall	Conference	Standing	Bowl/playoffs
Maryland State / Maryland Eastern Shore Hawks (Central Intercollegiate Athletic Association) (1969–1970)
1969	Maryland State	1–7	1–5	14th	
1970	Maryland Eastern Shore	1–8	1–5	8th (Northern)	
Maryland State / Maryland Eastern Shore:		2–15	2–10		
Total:		2–15			
