= Drag boat racing =

Drag boat racing is a form of drag racing which takes place on water rather than land. As with land-based drag racing, competitors race their vehicles for the lowest elapsed time (low ET) over a straight race course of a defined length.

There are three standard drag race course lengths, 660 feet (1/8 mile), 1,320 foot (1/4 mile), and the most common length, used in professional drag boat racing, 1,000 feet (3/16 mile plus 10 feet). Unlike traditional drag racing on land, which begins from a standing start, drag boat racing begins from a short rolling start to a point that cannot be passed until the green "start" light illuminates, an idea which has now taken place with drag racing on land ("roll racing").

There are numerous categories of professional and sportsmen classes based on various engine configuration, fuel type, hull design and propulsion types. The premier category of drag boat racing being the Top Fuel Hydroplane class which is the water based equivalent to Top Fuel Dragsters capable of covering the liquid quarter mile in less than five seconds with a top speed of around 270 mph (434 km/h). The biggest event on the drag boat calendar is the LODBRS World Finals which takes place at Firebird Raceway Phoenix, Arizona.

Lake Lucas was the world's first purpose-built drag boat racing lake when built in 2011. The facility played host to drag boat races for eight straight years until the Lucas Oil Drag Boat Series was discontinued at the conclusion of the 2018 season. Citing a need for the company to move in a new direction, then everything changed in 2020. Drag Boats then returned to Lake Lucas in 2020 for events under SDBA, KDBA sanctions and then in 2021 for a three-day summer event Diamond Nartionals for drag boats with top fuel.

== Notable drag boat racers ==
- Eddie Hill
- Casey McClellan
- Tim Stokes

== See also ==
- List of fatal accidents in motorboat racing
- Austin Aqua Festival
- Hydroplane (boat)
- Lucas Oil
