= Ed Holler =

American football player (1940–2021)

No. 65, 31, 53, 58
- Position: Linebacker

Personal information
- Born: January 23, 1940; Bluefield, West Virginia, U.S.
- Died: November 21, 2021 (aged 81)
- Listed height: 6 ft 2 in (1.88 m)
- Listed weight: 235 lb (107 kg)

Career information
- High school: Dreher (Columbia, South Carolina)
- College: South Carolina (1958-1962)
- NFL draft: 1963: 14th round, 196th overall pick

Career history
- Green Bay Packers (1963); Pittsburgh Steelers (1964); Los Angeles Rams (1965)*; Toronto Rifles (1966-1967); Norfolk Neptunes (1967)
- * Offseason or practice squad member only

Career NFL statistics
- Interceptions: 1
- Sacks: 1
- Punts: 31
- Punt yards: 1,334
- Longest punt: 64
- Stats at Pro Football Reference

Ed "Punky" Holler (born Joseph Edward Holler; January 23, 1940 – November 21, 2021), was a linebacker in the National Football League (NFL).

== Football career ==
Holler was drafted in the fourteenth round of the 1963 NFL draft by the Green Bay Packers and played that season with team. The following season, he played with the Pittsburgh Steelers.

He played at the collegiate level at the University of South Carolina.

== Career as a lawyer ==
Holler represented football legend George Rogers on his cocaine charges in 1990. In 2014, he received the Presidents Award from the South Carolina Association for Justice. At the time of his death, in 2021, Holler was a named partner with HOLLER, GARNER, CORBETT, GILCHRIST, & MASON.
