= Roger Gill (American football) =

American football player (1940–1999)

No. 32, 81
- Positions: Wide receiver, Halfback

Personal information
- Born: October 14, 1940; League City, Texas, U.S.
- Died: January 14, 1999 (aged 58); San Antonio, Texas, U.S.
- Listed height: 6 ft 1 in (1.85 m)
- Listed weight: 200 lb (91 kg)

Career information
- High school: Harlandale (TX)
- College: Texas Tech
- NFL draft: 1963: 12th round, 158th overall pick
- AFL draft: 1963: 22nd round, 170th overall pick

Career history
- Philadelphia Eagles (1964–1965); San Antonio Toros (1967–1971)

Career NFL statistics
- Receptions: 5
- Receiving yards: 85
- Return yards: 256
- Stats at Pro Football Reference

Roger Ewing Gill (October 14, 1940 – January 14, 1999) was an American professional football player who was a wide receiver and tight end in the American Football League (AFL) and the National Football League (NFL). He played college football for the Texas Tech Red Raiders.

== Professional career ==
Gill was selected by the Philadelphia Eagles in the 12th round of the 1963 NFL draft and by the San Diego Chargers in the 22nd round of the 1963 AFL draft. In 1965, he caught one pass for 27 yards in 13 games played before suffering a season ending groin injury in December. After being released by the Eagles, Gill played minor league football for the San Antonio Toros in the Continental Football League and the Texas Football League. He was inducted into the Minor League Football Hall of Fame in 1986.

== Post-playing career ==
Gill remained active in football in San Antionio after retiring as a player. He was the general manager of the San Antonio Gunslingers of the United States Football League.
