= Jon Anabo =

American gridiron football player (born 1939)

Profile
- Position: QB

Personal information
- Born: August 24, 1939 (age 87); Los Angeles, California, U.S.
- Listed height: 6 ft 3 in (1.91 m)
- Listed weight: 210 lb (95 kg)

Career information
- High school: Armijo HS
- College: Vallejo / Fresno State
- NFL draft: 1962: 19th round, 263rd overall pick
- AFL draft: 1963: 23rd round, 177th overall pick

Career history
- 1963–1964: Cleveland Browns*
- 1964–1965: Edmonton Eskimos
- * Offseason or practice squad member only

Johanes "Jon" S. Anabo (born August 24, 1939) is a former professional gridiron football quarterback who played for the Edmonton Eskimos of the Canadian Football League (CFL). From 1964 to 1965, he played in 11 regular season games, passing for 803 yards, five touchdowns, and eight interceptions. Prior to playing for the Eskimos, Anabo played for the Fresno State Bulldogs and spent time on the practice squad of the Cleveland Browns from the National Football League (NFL).

While in college, Anabo was one of the top passing quarterbacks among West Coast programs. He played in tandem with fellow quarterback Beau Carter in 1961 and 1962 as he helped lead the Bulldogs to an undefeated season. Anabo was twice named to the All-West Coast team released by United Press International. Anabo was selected in the 19th round of the 1962 NFL draft by the Cleveland Browns and the 23rd round of the 1963 AFL draft by the Oakland Raiders.

== Early career ==
Anabo attended Armijo High School before going on to play college football at Vallejo Junior College (later renamed Solano Community College) from 1958 to 1960. While at Vallejo, Anabo also played baseball. In 2004, Anabo was inducted into the Solano Community College Hall of Fame.

In 1961, Anabo transferred to Fresno State University to play for the Fresno State Bulldogs. The Bulldogs played two different units of offensive players, and Anabo split playing time with fellow quarterback Beau Carter. He was credited for leading the Bulldogs to an upset victory of the University of the Pacific in the game's final seconds. The Bulldogs had a perfect season in 1961 as Anabo passed for 454 yards and eight touchdowns. Fresno State defeated the Bowling Green Falcons 36–6 in the Mercy Bowl, and Anabo was named to the United Press International West Coast Small College All-Star team the following week.

In 1962, Anabo and Carter were described as the "best 1-2 quarterback punch on the West Coast". The duo ranked sixth in the nation in total passing yardage through the third week of November. Anabo set new records for Fresno State in passing and was again named to the All-Coast team. Anabo was selected for the All-American Bowl representing the Small Schools All-Star team, and the Small Schools won the annual game for the first time after Anabo scored a touchdown on a quarterback run in the fourth quarter. He ended his college career with 96 completions on 178 attempted passes for 1,334 yards and 17 touchdowns.

Anabo also participated in the high jump event for the track and field team at Fresno State.

== Professional career ==
=== Cleveland Browns ===
In 1962, the Cleveland Browns selected Anabo in the nineteenth round of the 1962 NFL draft with the 263rd overall pick. The Oakland Raiders of the American Football League selected Anabo the following year in the twenty-third round of the 1963 AFL draft with the 177th overall pick. Anabo chose to sign with the Browns in January 1963. After attending training camp with the Browns, Anabo was placed on the practice squad for the entirety of the 1963 season.

Anabo attempted to make the Browns' regular season roster in 1964. In his first drive with the Browns during a preseason game, Anabo threw a 74-yard touchdown pass to flanker Walter Roberts. In September, the Browns released Anabo as part of their final roster cuts before the regular season.

=== Edmonton Eskimos ===
After being released by the Browns, Anabo signed with the Edmonton Eskimos of the Canadian Football League. He played six regular season games for the Eskimos in 1964, passing for 621 yards with four touchdowns and seven interceptions. By the end of the season, Anabo was starting for the Eskimos. He played in five regular season games in 1965 but averaged only 3.9 yards per attempt. In August, Anabo suffered a minor injury which he played through later in the month. After starting the season with a 0–5 record, the Eskimos cut Anabo in late August.

== Later life ==
After retiring from professional football, Anabo coached high school football at Hoover High School. After serving as a quarterback and receivers coach at Fresno State, Anabo started a career in broadcasting as a football color commentator.
