= John Contoulis =

American football player (1939–2023)

No. 75, 77, 76
- Position: Defensive tackle

Personal information
- Born: October 9, 1939; New London, Connecticut, U.S.
- Died: November 5, 2023 (aged 84); Elmhurst, Pennsylvania, U.S.
- Listed height: 6 ft 5 in (1.96 m)
- Listed weight: 260 lb (118 kg)

Career information
- High school: New London
- College: Connecticut
- NFL draft: 1962: 16th round, 213th overall pick
- AFL draft: 1963: 4th round, 27th overall pick

Career history
- Minnesota Vikings (1963)*; Ansonia Black Knights (1963); New York Giants (1964); Holyoke Bombers (1965); Hartford Charter Oaks (1966)
- * Offseason or practice squad member only

Awards and highlights
- Third-team Little All-American (1962)

Career NFL statistics
- Sacks: 0.5
- Stats at Pro Football Reference

John Contoulis (October 9, 1939 – November 5, 2023) is an American former professional football player who was a defensive tackle for the New York Giants of the National Football League (NFL) in 1964. He played college football for the Connecticut Huskies.

Contoulis died on November 5, 2023, at the age of 84.
