= Bob Middleton (American football) =

American football player and coach (1941–2010)

Robert Middleton
Biographical details
- Born: January 22, 1941
- Died: June 25, 2010 (aged 69); Grand Blanc Township, Michigan, U.S.

Playing career
- 1959–1962: Ohio State
- Position: End

Coaching career (HC unless noted)
- 1970–1973: Ohio Northern
- 1974–2001: Fenton HS (MI)

Head coaching record
- Overall: 15–21 (college)

Accomplishments and honors

Championships
- National (1961)

Robert L. Middleton (January 22, 1941 – June 25, 2010) was an American football player and coach. He served as the head football coach at Ohio Northern University in Ada, Ohio from 1970 to 1973, compiling a record of 15–21. A college football player at Ohio State University under Woody Hayes, Middleton was drafted by the Buffalo Bills in the 1963 AFL draft.
