= Rex Mirich =

American football player (born 1941)

No. 87, 78, 75, 76
- Positions: Defensive tackle, Defensive end

Personal information
- Born: March 11, 1941 (age 85); Florence, Arizona, U.S.
- Listed height: 6 ft 4 in (1.93 m)
- Listed weight: 250 lb (113 kg)

Career information
- High school: San Manuel (San Manuel, Arizona)
- College: Arizona State–Flagstaff (1960–1963)
- NFL draft: 1963: 16th round, 212th overall pick
- AFL draft: 1963: 20th round, 153rd overall pick

Career history
- Oakland Raiders (1964–1966); Denver Broncos (1967–1969); Boston Patriots (1970)

Career NFL/AFL statistics
- Fumble recoveries: 1
- Sacks: 5.5
- Stats at Pro Football Reference
- College Football Hall of Fame

Rex L. Mirich (born March 11, 1941) is an American former professional football player who was a defensive tackle in the American Football League (AFL) and the National Football League (NFL). After playing college football for the Arizona State–Flagstaff Lumberjacks, Mirich was selected by both the AFL and the NFL in 1963. He was selected by the Minnesota Vikings in the 16th round (212th overall) of the 1963 NFL draft and by the Oakland Raiders in the 20th round (153rd overall) of the 1963 AFL draft. He played seven seasons for the AFL's Oakland Raiders (1964–1966) and Denver Broncos (1967–1969), and the NFL's Boston Patriots (1970).

In 2012, he was inducted into the College Football Hall of Fame.
