= 1963 NFL draft =

National Football League draft

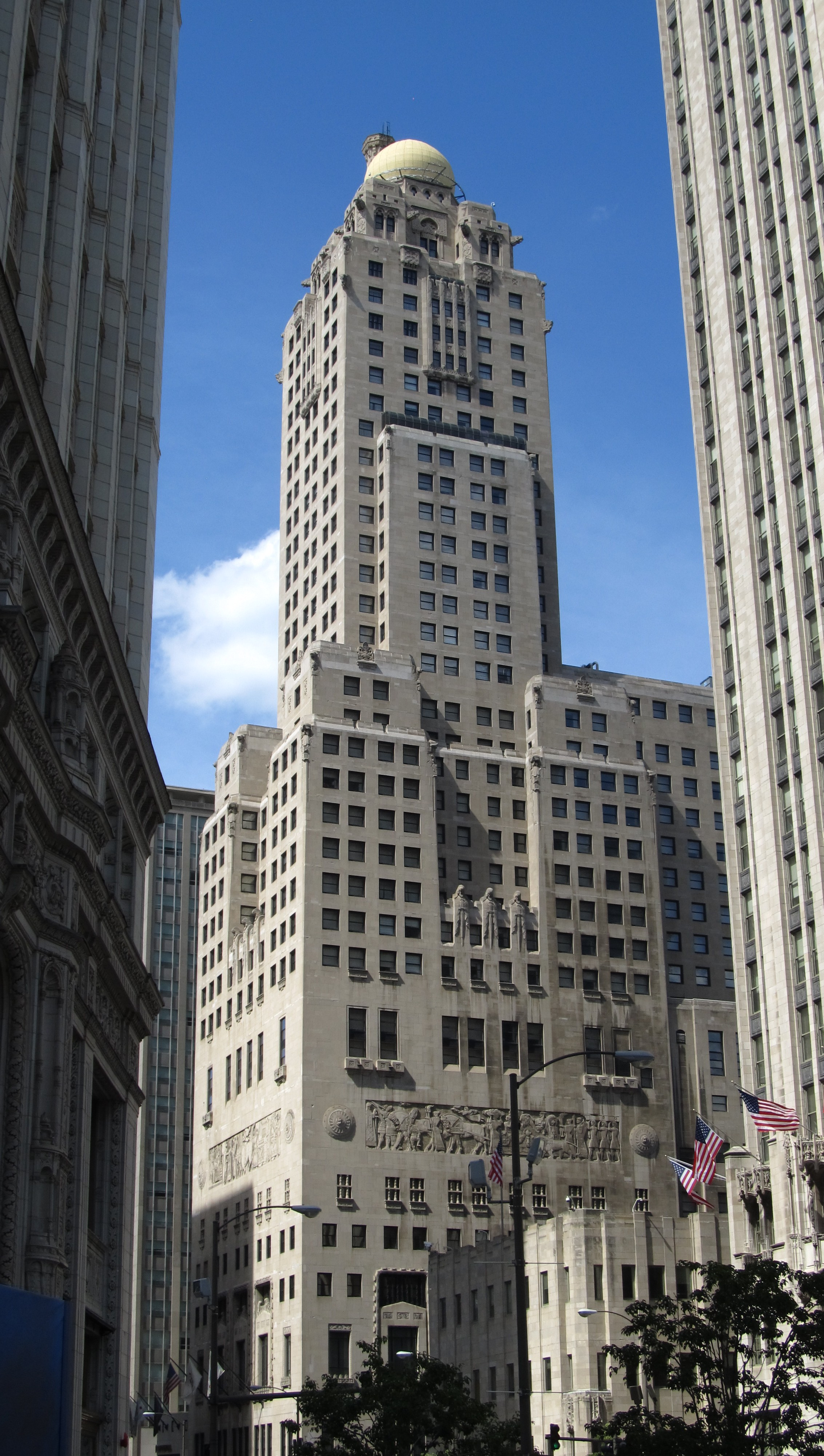
- The former Sheraton Hotel (draft location), photographed in 2013

General information
- Date: December 3, 1962
- Time: 11 am EST
- Location: Sheraton Hotel & Towers in Chicago, IL

Overview
- 280 total selections in 20 rounds
- League: NFL
- First selection: Terry Baker, Quarterback; Los Angeles Rams
- Mr. Irrelevant: Bobby Brezina, Back; Green Bay Packers
- Most selections (27): Green Bay Packers
- Fewest selections (13): Pittsburgh Steelers
- Hall of Famers: 7: LB Dave Robinson; LB Bobby Bell; TE John Mackey; TE Jackie Smith; OT Winston Hill; DT Buck Buchanan; CB Willie Brown

The 1963 NFL draft was held at the Sheraton in Chicago, Illinois, on Monday, December 3, 1962.

The first overall selection was quarterback Terry Baker of Oregon State, the Heisman Trophy winner, taken by the Los Angeles Rams. The AFL draft was held two days earlier in Dallas.

== Player selections ==
| = Pro Bowler | = AFL All-Star | = Hall of Famer |

=== Round 1 ===
| Pick # | NFL team | Player | Position | College |
|---|---|---|---|---|
| 1 | Los Angeles Rams | Terry Baker | Quarterback | Oregon State |
| 2 | St. Louis Cardinals | Jerry Stovall | Back | LSU |
| 3 | Minnesota Vikings | Jim Dunaway | Defensive Tackle | Mississippi |
| 4 | Philadelphia Eagles | Ed Budde | Offensive Guard | Michigan State |
| 5 | Baltimore Colts | Bob Vogel | Offensive Tackle | Ohio State |
| 6 | Dallas Cowboys | Lee Roy Jordan | Linebacker | Alabama |
| 7 | Washington Redskins | Pat Richter | End | Wisconsin |
| 8 | San Francisco 49ers | Kermit Alexander | Back | UCLA |
| 9 | Cleveland Browns | Tom Hutchinson | Wide receiver | Kentucky |
| 10 | Los Angeles Rams ^{(From Chicago Bears)} | Rufus Guthrie | Guard | Georgia Tech |
| 11 | Chicago Bears ^{(From Pittsburgh Steelers)} | Dave Behrman | Center | Michigan State |
| 12 | Detroit Lions | Daryl Sanders | Offensive Tackle | Ohio State |
| 13 | St. Louis Cardinals ^{(From New York Giants)} | Don Brumm | Defensive End | Purdue |
| 14 | Green Bay Packers | Dave Robinson | Linebacker | Penn State |

=== Round 2 ===
| Pick # | NFL team | Player | Position | College |
|---|---|---|---|---|
| 15 | Los Angeles Rams | Tom Nomina | Tackle | Miami (OH) |
| 16 | Minnesota Vikings | Bobby Bell | Tackle | Minnesota |
| 17 | St. Louis Cardinals | Bob Reynolds | Tackle | Bowling Green |
| 18 | Philadelphia Eagles | Ray Mansfield | Tackle | Washington |
| 19 | Baltimore Colts | John Mackey | Tight end | Syracuse |
| 20 | Chicago Bears | Steve Barnett | Tackle | Oregon |
| 21 | San Francisco 49ers | Walt Rock | Guard | Maryland |
| 22 | Washington Redskins | Lonnie Sanders | Cornerback | Michigan State |
| 23 | Cleveland Browns | Jim Kanicki | Tackle | Michigan State |
| 24 | Baltimore Colts | Butch Wilson | Back | Alabama |
| 25 | Chicago Bears | Bob Jencks | End | Miami (OH) |
| 26 | New York Giants | Frank Lasky | Tackle | Florida |
| 27 | Detroit Lions | Roy Williams | Tackle | Pacific |
| 28 | Green Bay Packers | Tom Brown | Safety | Maryland |

=== Round 3 ===
| Pick # | NFL team | Player | Position | College |
|---|---|---|---|---|
| 29 | Los Angeles Rams | Dave Costa | Guard | Utah |
| 30 | St. Louis Cardinals | Danny Brabham | Defensive end | Arkansas |
| 31 | Minnesota Vikings | Ray Poage | Wide receiver | Texas |
| 32 | Philadelphia Eagles | Dave Crossan | Guard | Maryland |
| 33 | St. Louis Cardinals | Mike Fracchia | Back | Alabama |
| 34 | Dallas Cowboys | Jim Price | Linebacker | Auburn |
| 35 | Washington Redskins | Ron Snidow | Tackle | Oregon |
| 36 | San Francisco 49ers | Don Lisbon | Back | Bowling Green |
| 37 | Los Angeles Rams | John Baker | Linebacker | Mississippi State |
| 38 | Chicago Bears | Larry Glueck | Defensive back | Villanova |
| 39 | Green Bay Packers | Dennis Claridge | Back | Nebraska |
| 40 | Philadelphia Eagles | Louis Guy | Back | Mississippi |
| 41 | New York Giants | Dick Skelly | Back | Florida |
| 42 | Green Bay Packers | Tony Liscio | Tackle | Tulsa |

=== Round 4 ===
| Pick # | NFL team | Player | Position | College |
|---|---|---|---|---|
| 43 | Los Angeles Rams | John Griffin | Back | Memphis State |
| 44 | Minnesota Vikings | Paul Flatley | End | Northwestern |
| 45 | St. Louis Cardinals | Don Estes | Tackle | Louisiana State |
| 46 | San Francisco 49ers | Harrison Rosdahl | Guard | Penn State |
| 47 | Baltimore Colts | Jerry Logan | Back | West Texas State |
| 48 | Dallas Cowboys | Whaley Hall | Tackle | Mississippi |
| 49 | Chicago Bears | Stan Sanders | End | Whittier |
| 50 | San Francisco 49ers | Hugh Campbell | End | Washington State |
| 51 | Cleveland Browns | Bill Munsey | Back | Minnesota |
| 52 | Chicago Bears | Charley Mitchell | Running back | Washington |
| 53 | Baltimore Colts | Harlow Fullwood | Guard | Virginia |
| 54 | Green Bay Packers | Lionel Aldridge | Guard | Utah State |
| 55 | Detroit Lions | Chuck Walton | Guard | Iowa State |
| 56 | Green Bay Packers | Carlton Simons | Center | Stanford |

=== Round 5 ===
| Pick # | NFL team | Player | Position | College |
|---|---|---|---|---|
| 57 | Los Angeles Rams | Joe Auer | Running back | Georgia Tech |
| 58 | St. Louis Cardinals | Bill "Thunder" Thornton | Back | Nebraska |
| 59 | Minnesota Vikings | Gary Kaltenbach | Tackle | Pittsburgh |
| 60 | Los Angeles Rams | Roland Benson | Tackle | Miami (FL) |
| 61 | Baltimore Colts | Bill Ventura | Tackle | Richmond |
| 62 | New York Giants | Dave Hill | Tackle | Auburn |
| 63 | Green Bay Packers | Jack Cvercko | Guard | Northwestern |
| 64 | San Francisco 49ers | Vern Burke | End | Oregon State |
| 65 | San Francisco 49ers | Jim "Preacher" Pilot | Back | New Mexico State |
| 66 | San Francisco 49ers | Gary Moeller | Guard | Ohio State |
| 67 | Los Angeles Rams | Don Chuy | Tackle | Clemson |
| 68 | Cleveland Browns | Frank Baker | Back | Toledo |
| 69 | New York Giants | Lou Slaby | Back | Pittsburgh |
| 70 | Green Bay Packers | Dan Grimm | Tackle | Colorado |

=== Round 6 ===
| Pick # | NFL team | Player | Position | College |
|---|---|---|---|---|
| 71 | Los Angeles Rams | George Saimes | Safety | Michigan State |
| 72 | Cleveland Browns | Ernie Borghetti | Tackle | Pittsburgh |
| 73 | St. Louis Cardinals | Bob Paremore | Back | Florida A&M |
| 74 | Cleveland Browns | Tom Bloom | Back | Purdue |
| 75 | Baltimore Colts | Jerry Cook | Back | Texas |
| 76 | Green Bay Packers | John Simmons | End | Tulsa |
| 77 | San Francisco 49ers | Pat Emerick | Guard | Western Michigan |
| 78 | Washington Redskins | Charley Nickoson | Tackle | Ohio |
| 79 | Los Angeles Rams | Terry Monaghan | Tackle | Penn State |
| 80 | Chicago Bears | John Johnson | Tackle | Indiana |
| 81 | Chicago Bears | Dave Mathieson | Quarterback | Washington State |
| 82 | New York Giants | Bob Petrich | Tackle | West Texas State |
| 83 | Detroit Lions | Don King | Halfback | Syracuse |
| 84 | Green Bay Packers | Jan Barrett | End | Fresno State |

=== Round 7 ===
| Pick # | NFL team | Player | Position | College |
|---|---|---|---|---|
| 85 | Los Angeles Rams | Bill Zorn | Tackle | Michigan State |
| 86 | St. Louis Cardinals | Jim Moss | Tackle | South Carolina |
| 87 | New York Giants | Dave Hoppmann | Back | Iowa State |
| 88 | Philadelphia Eagles | Lee Roy Caffey | Linebacker | Texas A&M |
| 89 | Baltimore Colts | Willie Richardson | End | Jackson State |
| 90 | Dallas Cowboys | Marv Clothier | Guard | Kansas |
| 91 | Washington Redskins | Dave Francis | Back | Ohio State |
| 92 | San Francisco 49ers | Ernest DeCourley | Tackle | Morehead State |
| 93 | Green Bay Packers | Gary Kroner | Back | Wisconsin |
| 94 | Chicago Bears | Paul Underhill | Back | Missouri |
| 95 | Green Bay Packers | Olin Hill | Tackle | Furman |
| 96 | Detroit Lions | John Gamble | Guard | Pacific |
| 97 | New York Giants | Burt Petkus | Guard | Northwestern |
| 98 | Green Bay Packers | Turnley Todd | Linebacker | Virginia |

=== Round 8 ===
| Pick # | NFL team | Player | Position | College |
|---|---|---|---|---|
| 99 | Los Angeles Rams | Anton Peters | Tackle | Florida |
| 100 | Minnesota Vikings | Jim O'Mahoney | Linebacker | Miami (FL) |
| 101 | St. Louis Cardinals | Jim Cook | Guard | Oklahoma |
| 102 | Philadelphia Eagles | Tom Woodeshick | Running back | West Virginia |
| 103 | Baltimore Colts | Dave Hayes | Back | Penn State |
| 104 | Green Bay Packers | Keith Kinderman | Back | Florida State |
| 105 | San Francisco 49ers | Roger Locke | End | Arizona State |
| 106 | Philadelphia Eagles | Gene Sykes | Back | Louisiana State |
| 107 | Cleveland Browns | Walt Sweeney | End | Syracuse |
| 108 | Pittsburgh Steelers | Frank Atkinson | Tackle | Stanford |
| 109 | Chicago Bears | Dennis Harmon | Defensive back | Southern Illinois |
| 110 | New York Giants | Dave Herman | Guard | Michigan State |
| 111 | Detroit Lions | Dennis Gaubatz | Linebacker | Louisiana State |
| 112 | Green Bay Packers | Louis Rettino | Back | Villanova |

=== Round 9 ===
| Pick # | NFL team | Player | Position | College |
|---|---|---|---|---|
| 113 | Los Angeles Rams | Mel Profit | End | UCLA |
| 114 | St. Louis Cardinals | Willis Crenshaw | Back | Kansas State |
| 115 | Minnesota Vikings | Bob Hoover | Back | Florida |
| 116 | Philadelphia Eagles | Dennis Ward | Tackle | Oklahoma |
| 117 | Baltimore Colts | Don Trull | Quarterback | Baylor |
| 118 | Chicago Bears | Monte Day | Tackle | Fresno State |
| 119 | Washington Redskins | Billy Joe | Running back | Villanova |
| 120 | San Francisco 49ers | John Maczuzak | Tackle | Pittsburgh |
| 121 | Cleveland Browns | Dave Raimey | Defensive back | Michigan |
| 122 | Baltimore Colts | Dave Watson | Linebacker | Georgia Tech |
| 123 | Pittsburgh Steelers | Gene Carrington | Tackle | Boston College |
| 124 | Detroit Lions | Ken Dill | Linebacker | Mississippi |
| 125 | New York Giants | Bob Taylor | Tackle | Maryland-Eastern Shore |
| 126 | Green Bay Packers | Bill Freeman | Tackle | Southern Mississippi |

=== Round 10 ===
| Pick # | NFL team | Player | Position | College |
|---|---|---|---|---|
| 127 | Los Angeles Rams | Curt Farrier | Tackle | Montana State |
| 128 | Minnesota Vikings | Terry Kosens | Back | Hofstra |
| 129 | St. Louis Cardinals | Jackie Smith | Tight end | Northwestern State (LA) |
| 130 | Philadelphia Eagles | Peter Liske | Quarterback | Penn State |
| 131 | Baltimore Colts | Bill Siekierski | Guard | Missouri |
| 132 | Dallas Cowboys | Rod Scheyer | Tackle | Washington |
| 133 | San Francisco 49ers | Dick Lopour | Back | Huron |
| 134 | Washington Redskins | Rod Foster | Guard | Ohio State |
| 135 | Cleveland Browns | Jim Bobbitt | Guard | Michigan State |
| 136 | Pittsburgh Steelers | Bill Nelsen | Quarterback | USC |
| 137 | Chicago Bears | Ed Hoerster | Linebacker | Notre Dame |
| 138 | New York Giants | Mike Taliaferro | Quarterback | Illinois |
| 139 | Detroit Lions | Nick Ryder | Back | Miami (FL) |
| 140 | Green Bay Packers | Earl McQuiston | Guard | Iowa |

=== Round 11 ===
| Pick # | NFL team | Player | Position | College |
|---|---|---|---|---|
| 141 | Los Angeles Rams | Dave Theisen | Back | Nebraska |
| 142 | St. Louis Cardinals | Jimmy Burson | Defensive back | Auburn |
| 143 | Minnesota Vikings | John Campbell | Linebacker | Minnesota |
| 144 | Philadelphia Eagles | Ralph Heck | Linebacker | Colorado |
| 145 | Baltimore Colts | Winston Hill | Tackle | Texas Southern |
| 146 | Dallas Cowboys | Ray Schoenke | Center | Southern Methodist |
| 147 | Washington Redskins | Allen Schau | End | Western Michigan |
| 148 | San Francisco 49ers | Steve Shafer | Back | Utah State |
| 149 | Cleveland Browns | Art Graham | End | Boston College |
| 150 | Chicago Bears | James Tullis | Defensive back | Florida A&M |
| 151 | Pittsburgh Steelers | Hewritt Dixon | Back | Florida A&M |
| 152 | Detroit Lions | Karl Kassulke | Defensive back | Drake |
| 153 | New York Giants | Don McKinnon | Center | Dartmouth |
| 154 | Green Bay Packers | Marv Fleming | Tight end | Utah |

=== Round 12 ===
| Pick # | NFL team | Player | Position | College |
|---|---|---|---|---|
| 155 | Los Angeles Rams | Billy Moody | Back | Arkansas |
| 156 | Minnesota Vikings | John Sklopan | Back | Southern Mississippi |
| 157 | St. Louis Cardinals | Chuck Walker | Guard | Duke |
| 158 | Philadelphia Eagles | Roger Gill | Back | Texas Tech |
| 159 | Baltimore Colts | Jimmy Maples | Center | Baylor |
| 160 | Dallas Cowboys | Bill Perkins | Running back | Iowa |
| 161 | San Francisco 49ers | Bob Benton | Tackle | Mississippi State |
| 162 | Washington Redskins | Bob Caldwell | Center | Georgia Tech |
| 163 | Cleveland Browns | Lindy Infante | Defensive back | Florida |
| 164 | Pittsburgh Steelers | Roy Curry | Back | Jackson State |
| 165 | Chicago Bears | Dick Drummond | Back | George Washington |
| 166 | New York Giants | Ed Adamchik | Guard | Pittsburgh |
| 167 | Detroit Lions | Tom Janik | Defensive back | Texas A&I |
| 168 | Green Bay Packers | Daryle Lamonica ^{4} | Quarterback | Notre Dame |

- ^{4} Signed with the Buffalo Bills of the American Football League.

=== Round 13 ===
| Pick # | NFL team | Player | Position | College |
|---|---|---|---|---|
| 169 | Los Angeles Rams | Al Hildebrand | Tackle | Stanford |
| 170 | St. Louis Cardinals | Alex Zyskowski | Back | Wichita State |
| 171 | Minnesota Vikings | Dave O'Brien | Tackle | Boston College |
| 172 | Philadelphia Eagles | Joe Iacone | Back | West Chester |
| 173 | Baltimore Colts | Paul Watters | Tackle | Miami (OH) |
| 174 | Dallas Cowboys | Paul Wicker | Tackle | Fresno State |
| 175 | Washington Redskins | John Greiner | End | Purdue |
| 176 | San Francisco 49ers | Dick Schultz | Tackle | Ohio |
| 177 | Cleveland Browns | Dave Katterhenrich | Back | Ohio State |
| 178 | Chicago Bears | John Szumczyk | Back | Trinity (CT) |
| 179 | Pittsburgh Steelers | Harold Gray | Linebacker | Cal State-Los Angeles |
| 180 | Detroit Lions | Ernie Clark | Linebacker | Michigan State |
| 181 | New York Giants | Jim Moss | Back | West Virginia |
| 182 | Green Bay Packers | Bill Kellum | Tackle | Tulane |

=== Round 14 ===
| Pick # | NFL team | Player | Position | College |
|---|---|---|---|---|
| 183 | Los Angeles Rams | Alan Arbuse | Tackle | Rhode Island |
| 184 | Minnesota Vikings | Ralph Ferrisi | Back | Southern Connecticut State |
| 185 | St. Louis Cardinals | Paul Lea | Back | Oklahoma |
| 186 | Philadelphia Eagles | Nate Ramsey | Back | Indiana |
| 187 | Baltimore Colts | Neal Petties | End | San Diego State |
| 188 | Dallas Cowboys | Lou Cioci | Linebacker | Boston College |
| 189 | San Francisco 49ers | Bill Tobin | Back | Missouri |
| 190 | Washington Redskins | Tom Winingder | Back | Georgia Tech |
| 191 | Cleveland Browns | Staley Faulkner | Tackle | Texas |
| 192 | Pittsburgh Steelers | Robert Dickerson | End | Bethune-Cookman |
| 193 | Chicago Bears | Gordon Banks | Back | Fisk |
| 194 | New York Giants | Joe Williams | Back | Iowa |
| 195 | Detroit Lions | Bill O'Brien | Tackle | Xavier |
| 196 | Green Bay Packers | Ed Holler | Linebacker | South Carolina |

=== Round 15 ===
| Pick # | NFL team | Player | Position | College |
|---|---|---|---|---|
| 197 | Los Angeles Rams | Larry Campbell | End | Toledo |
| 198 | St. Louis Cardinals | Ed Scrutchins | End | Toledo |
| 199 | Minnesota Vikings | John Murio | End | Whitworth |
| 200 | Philadelphia Eagles | George Heard | End | New Mexico |
| 201 | Baltimore Colts | Leon Mavity | Defensive back | Colorado |
| 202 | Dallas Cowboys | Jerry Overton | Defensive back | Utah |
| 203 | Washington Redskins | Harry Butsko | Linebacker | Maryland |
| 204 | San Francisco 49ers | Oliver Ross | Back | West Texas State |
| 205 | Cleveland Browns | Lynn Reade | Tackle | USC |
| 206 | Chicago Bears | Bob Dentel | Center | Miami (FL) |
| 207 | Pittsburgh Steelers | Matt Szykowny | Back | Iowa |
| 208 | Detroit Lions | Jim Simon | End | Miami (FL) |
| 209 | New York Giants | Lane Howell | Center | Grambling |
| 210 | Green Bay Packers | Gene Breen | Tackle | Virginia Tech |

=== Round 16 ===
| Pick # | NFL team | Player | Position | College |
|---|---|---|---|---|
| 211 | Los Angeles Rams | Walter Burden | Linebacker | McNeese State |
| 212 | Minnesota Vikings | Rex Mirich | Tackle | Northern Arizona |
| 213 | St. Louis Cardinals | John Slafkosky | Tackle | Notre Dame |
| 214 | Philadelphia Eagles | Ronnie Goodwin | Back | Baylor |
| 215 | Baltimore Colts | Dick Quast | Guard | Memphis State |
| 216 | Dallas Cowboys | Dennis Golden | Tackle | Holy Cross |
| 217 | San Francisco 49ers | Jim Bogdalek | Tackle | Toledo |
| 218 | Washington Redskins | Dave Adams | Guard | Arkansas |
| 219 | Cleveland Browns | Dick Kelly | Guard | Georgia |
| 220 | Pittsburgh Steelers | Andy Russell | Linebacker | Missouri |
| 221 | Chicago Bears | Lowell Caylor | Defensive back | Miami (OH) |
| 222 | New York Giants | Charlie Killett | Back | Memphis State |
| 223 | Detroit Lions | Charlie Johnson | Tackle | Villanova |
| 224 | Green Bay Packers | Coolidge Hunt | Back | Texas Tech |

=== Round 17 ===
| Pick # | NFL team | Player | Position | College |
|---|---|---|---|---|
| 225 | Los Angeles Rams | Jerrel Wilson | Punter | Southern Mississippi |
| 226 | St. Louis Cardinals | Dave Meggyesy | Linebacker | Syracuse |
| 227 | Minnesota Vikings | Tom Munsey | Back | Concord |
| 228 | Philadelphia Eagles | Gordon Rush | Back | Tulane |
| 229 | Baltimore Colts | Kern Carson | Back | San Diego State |
| 230 | Dallas Cowboys | Ernie Park | Guard | McMurry |
| 231 | Washington Redskins | Ron Whaley | Defensive back | Tennessee-Chattanooga |
| 232 | San Francisco 49ers | Ken Reed | Guard | Tulsa |
| 233 | Cleveland Browns | Dick Anderson | End | Penn State |
| 234 | Chicago Bears | John Sisk | Back | Miami (FL) |
| 235 | Pittsburgh Steelers | Tim Stein | Center | Miami (OH) |
| 236 | Detroit Lions | Gene Frantz | Back | Brigham Young |
| 237 | New York Giants | Bob McAdams | Tackle | North Carolina Central |
| 238 | Green Bay Packers | Thurman Walker | End | Illinois |

=== Round 18 ===
| Pick # | NFL team | Player | Position | College |
|---|---|---|---|---|
| 239 | Los Angeles Rams | Buddy Soefker | Back | Louisiana State |
| 240 | Minnesota Vikings | Tom McIntyre | Tackle | St. John's (MN) |
| 241 | St. Louis Cardinals | Larry Stallings | Tackle | Georgia Tech |
| 242 | Philadelphia Eagles | Rudy Mathews | Tackle | Texas Christian |
| 243 | Baltimore Colts | Luther Woodruff | Tackle | North Carolina A&T |
| 244 | Dallas Cowboys | Bill Frank | Tackle | Colorado |
| 245 | San Francisco 49ers | John Sellers | Tackle | Bakersfield J.C. |
| 246 | Washington Redskins | Drew Roberts | End | Cal State-Humboldt |
| 247 | Cleveland Browns | Bobby Garvin | Tackle | Mississippi State |
| 248 | Pittsburgh Steelers | Jim Bradshaw | Back | Tennessee-Chattanooga |
| 249 | Chicago Bears | Jeff Slabaugh | End | Indiana |
| 250 | New York Giants | Bill Pashe | Back | George Washington |
| 251 | Detroit Lions | Al Greer | End | Jackson State |
| 252 | Green Bay Packers | Luis Hernandez | Guard | Texas-El Paso |

=== Round 19 ===
| Pick # | NFL team | Player | Position | College |
|---|---|---|---|---|
| 253 | Los Angeles Rams | Dornel Nelson | Back | Arizona State |
| 254 | St. Louis Cardinals | Darnell Haney | Tackle | Utah State |
| 255 | Minnesota Vikings | Frank Horvath | Back | Youngstown State |
| 256 | Philadelphia Eagles | Mike Wasdovich | Guard | Indiana |
| 257 | Baltimore Colts | Steve Berzansky | Back | West Virginia |
| 258 | Dallas Cowboys | Jim Stiger | Back | Washington |
| 259 | Washington Redskins | Jim Turner | Quarterback | Utah State |
| 260 | San Francisco 49ers | Bob Price | Guard | North Texas State |
| 261 | Cleveland Browns | Gary Sherman | Linebacker | Bowling Green |
| 262 | Chicago Bears | Bob Yaksick | Defensive back | Rutgers |
| 263 | Pittsburgh Steelers | Roger Berg | Tackle | St. Thomas (MN) |
| 264 | Detroit Lions | Lucien Reeberg | Tackle | Hampton |
| 265 | New York Giants | Buck Buchanan | Defensive tackle | Grambling |
| 266 | Green Bay Packers | Herman Hamp | Back | Fresno State |

=== Round 20 ===
| Pick # | NFL team | Player | Position | College |
|---|---|---|---|---|
| 267 | Los Angeles Rams | Bill Redell | Defensive back | Occidental |
| 268 | Minnesota Vikings | Mailon Kent | Back | Auburn |
| 269 | St. Louis Cardinals | Bill Clay | End | Arkansas |
| 270 | Philadelphia Eagles | Ben Rizzo | Back | Miami (FL) |
| 271 | Baltimore Colts | D.L. Hurd | End | Cal State-San Francisco |
| 272 | Dallas Cowboys | Tommy Lucas | End | Texas |
| 273 | San Francisco 49ers | Don Davis | Back | McMurry |
| 274 | Washington Redskins | Joe Baughan | Tackle | Auburn |
| 275 | Cleveland Browns | Steve Shaw | Back | Vanderbilt |
| 276 | Pittsburgh Steelers | Jim Traficant | Back | Pittsburgh |
| 277 | Chicago Bears | John Gregory | End | Baldwin–Wallace |
| 278 | New York Giants | Homer Jones | Back | Texas Southern |
| 279 | Detroit Lions | Gordon Scarborough | Back | East Texas State |
| 280 | Green Bay Packers | Bobby Brezina | Back | Houston |

| = Pro Bowler | = AFL All-Star | = Hall of Famer |

== Hall of Famers ==
- Bobby Bell, linebacker from Minnesota taken 2nd round, 16th overall by the Minnesota Vikings.

Inducted: Professional Football Hall of Fame class of 1983.

- Buck Buchanan, defensive tackle from Grambling taken 19th round, 265th overall by the New York Giants.

Inducted: Professional Football Hall of Fame class of 1990.

- John Mackey, tight end from Syracuse taken 2nd round, 19th overall by the Baltimore Colts.

Inducted: Professional Football Hall of Fame class of 1992.

- Jackie Smith, tight end from Northwestern State taken 10th round, 129th overall by the St. Louis Cardinals.

Inducted: Professional Football Hall of Fame class of 1994.

- Dave Robinson, linebacker from Penn State taken 1st round, 14th overall by the Green Bay Packers.

Inducted: Professional Football Hall of Fame class of 2013.

- Willie Brown, cornerback from Grambling State, signed undrafted by Houston Oilers.

Inducted: Professional Football Hall of Fame class of 1984.

- Winston Hill, offensive tackle from Texas Southern taken 11th round, 145th overall by the Baltimore Colts.

Inducted: Professional Football Hall of Fame class of 2020.

== Notable undrafted players ==
| ^{†} | = Pro Bowler | ‡ | = Hall of Famer |

| Original NFL team | Player | Pos. | College | Notes |
|---|---|---|---|---|
| Houston Oilers | Willie Brown^{‡} | CB | Grambling State | |
| Baltimore Colts | Gary Cuozzo | QB | Virginia | |
| Cleveland Browns | Larry Benz | S | Northwestern | |
| Dallas Cowboys | Wendell Hayes | RB | Humboldt State | |
| Los Angeles Rams | Bill Swain | LB | Oregon | |
| Minnesota Vikings | Lee Calland | CB | Louisville | |
| Minnesota Vikings | Mike Eischeid | P | Upper Iowa | |
| Minnesota Vikings | Don Hultz | DT | Southern Mississippi | |
| Minnesota Vikings | Ron Vander Kelen | QB | Wisconsin | |
| Philadelphia Eagles | Mike Clark ^{†} | K | Texas A&M | |
| St. Louis Cardinals | Doug Hart | CB | Texas–Arlington | |
| Washington Redskins | Ted Rzempoluch | DB | Virginia | |

== See also ==
- 1963 American Football League draft
