= Harold Hays =

American football player (born 1939)

No. 56, 54
- Position: Linebacker

Personal information
- Born: September 24, 1939 (age 87); Gulfport, Mississippi, U.S.
- Listed height: 6 ft 2 in (1.88 m)
- Listed weight: 225 lb (102 kg)

Career information
- High school: Hattiesburg (Hattiesburg, Mississippi)
- College: Southern Miss
- NFL draft: 1962: 14th round, 186th overall pick
- AFL draft: 1962: 26th round, 207th overall pick

Career history
- Dallas Cowboys (1963–1967); San Francisco 49ers (1968–1969)

Awards and highlights
- Second-team Little All-American (1962)

Career NFL statistics
- Sacks: 1.5
- Fumble recoveries: 1
- Stats at Pro Football Reference

Leo Harold Hays (born September 24, 1939) is an American former professional football player who was a linebacker in the National Football League (NFL) for the Dallas Cowboys and San Francisco 49ers. He played college football for the Southern Miss Golden Eagles.

== Early life ==
Hays attended Hattiesburg High School, where he played as a defensive tackle and center. After graduation he went into military service for one year.

He returned to play college football at Southern Mississippi University in 1960. He played center and linebacker and became a two-year starter.

In 1977, he was inducted into the Southern Mississippi Hall of Fame.

== Professional career ==
=== Dallas Cowboys ===
Hays was selected by the Dallas Cowboys in the fourteenth round (186th overall) of the 1962 NFL draft with a future draft pick, which allowed the team to draft him before his college eligibility was over. He also was selected by the Houston Oilers in the 26th round (207th overall) of the 1962 AFL draft.

On December 1, 1962, he signed with the Cowboys. He spent 5 seasons as a reserve linebacker, behind one of the greatest linebacking corps (Chuck Howley, Lee Roy Jordan and Dave Edwards) in NFL history. On June 24, 1968, he was traded to the San Francisco 49ers in exchange for a third round draft choice (#68-Tom Stincic).

=== San Francisco 49ers ===
Hays played two seasons with the San Francisco 49ers as a reserve linebacker. He was released on September 15, 1970.

== Personal life ==
Hays won the Texas National Bass Tournament in 1969.
