= Frank Atkinson (American football) =

American football player (born 1941)

No. 73, 74
- Positions: Defensive tackle, Defensive end

Personal information
- Born: December 13, 1941 (age 84); San Francisco, California, U.S.
- Died: 14 April 2025 (aged 83); Stanford, California, U.S.
- Listed height: 6 ft 3 in (1.91 m)
- Listed weight: 240 lb (109 kg)

Career information
- High school: Menlo-Atherton (Atherton, California)
- College: Stanford
- NFL draft: 1963: 8th round, 108th overall pick

Career history
- Pittsburgh Steelers (1963); Denver Broncos (1964)

Career NFL/AFL statistics
- Fumble recoveries: 1
- Stats at Pro Football Reference

Franklyn Rhem Atkinson (December 13, 1941 - April 14, 2025) was an American former professional football player who was a defensive lineman in the National Football League (NFL) and American Football League (AFL). He played college football for the Stanford Cardinal as a defensive tackle and offensive tackle. He was the 108th overall pick in the eighth round of the 1963 NFL draft. All Pittsburgh Steelers drafted ahead of him were either cut or traded before the start of the regular season making him the earliest draft pick to see the field. Atkinson went onto play 14 games for them in that season and was a starter at defensive tackle during the late season. He played in the inaugural Hall of Fame game in Canton, Ohio in 1963 and gained All-Rookie team mention. He played in the AFL for the Denver Broncos in 1964.

== See also ==
- List of American Football League players
