= 1963 American Football League draft =

American Football League draft

1963 AFL draft

General information
- Date: December 1, 1962
- Location: Dallas, TX

Overview
- 232 total selections in 29 rounds
- League: AFL
- First selection: Buck Buchanan, DT; Kansas City Chiefs
- Mr. Irrelevant: John Sisk, Jr., DB; Kansas City Chiefs
- Hall of Famers: 4

The 1963 American Football League draft was held in Dallas on Saturday, December 1, 1962.

The Kansas City Chiefs drafted as the Dallas Texans, as their relocation would take place a few months later. With the first overall selection, they took Buck Buchanan, a defensive tackle from Grambling in Louisiana. The NFL draft was held two days later in Chicago.

== Player selections ==
= Pro Bowler	= AFL All-Star	= Hall of Famer

=== Round 1 ===
Pick #	AFL Team	Player	Position	College
1	Kansas City Chiefs ^{(Pick acquired from Oakland)}	Buck Buchanan	Defensive tackle	Grambling
2	San Diego Chargers	Walt Sweeney	Guard	Syracuse
3	New York Jets	Jerry Stovall	Defensive back	LSU
4	Buffalo Bills	Dave Behrman	Center	Michigan State
5	Denver Broncos	Kermit Alexander	Defensive Back	UCLA
6	Houston Oilers	Danny Brabham	Linebacker	Arkansas
7	Boston Patriots	Art Graham	Wide receiver	Boston College
8	Kansas City Chiefs	Ed Budde	Guard	Michigan State

=== Round 2 ===
Pick #	AFL Team	Player	Position	College
9	Buffalo Bills ^{(Pick acquired from Oakland)}	Jim Dunaway	Defensive Tackle	Mississippi
10	San Diego Chargers	Rufus Guthrie	Guard	Georgia Tech
11	Denver Broncos ^{(Pick acquired from New York)}	Ray Poage	Tight end	Texas
12	Buffalo Bills	Tom Hutchinson	Tight End	Kentucky
13	Denver Broncos	Tom Nomina	Defensive Tackle	Miami (OH)
14	Boston Patriots	Lee Roy Jordan	Linebacker	Alabama
15	Houston Oilers	Don Estes	Guard	LSU
16	Kansas City Chiefs	Walt Rock	Tackle	Maryland

=== Round 3 ===
Pick #	AFL Team	Player	Position	College
17	San Diego Chargers ^{(Pick acquired from Oakland)}	Dave Robinson	Linebacker	Penn State
18	San Diego Chargers	Keith Kinderman	Fullback	Florida State
19	New York Jets	Willie Richardson	Flanker	Jackson State
20	Buffalo Bills	Tom Brown	Defensive Back	Maryland
21	Denver Broncos	Tom Janik	Defensive Back	Texas A&M-Kingsville
22	Houston Oilers	Jerry Cook	Halfback	Texas
23	Boston Patriots	Bob Vogel	Tackle	Ohio State
24	Kansas City Chiefs	Don Brumm	Defensive end	Purdue

=== Round 4 ===
Pick #	AFL Team	Player	Position	College
25	Houston Oilers ^{(Pick acquired from Oakland)}	Lee Roy Caffey	Linebacker	Texas A&M
26	San Diego Chargers	Roy Williams	Defensive Tackle	Pacific
27	New York Jets	John Contoulis	Defensive Tackle	Connecticut
28	Buffalo Bills	Tom Woodeshick	Running back	West Virginia
29	Denver Broncos	Lou Slaby	Linebacker	Pittsburgh
30	Boston Patriots	Bob Reynolds	Tackle	Bowling Green
31	Houston Oilers	Jerry Hopkins	Linebacker	Texas A&M
32	Kansas City Chiefs	Daryl Sanders	Tackle	Ohio State

=== Round 5 ===
Pick #	AFL Team	Player	Position	College
33	Houston Oilers ^{(Pick acquired from Oakland)}	Homer Jones	Split End	Texas Southern
34	San Diego Chargers	Larry Glueck	Defensive Back	Villanova
35	New York Jets	John Mackey	Tight End	Syracuse
36	Buffalo Bills	Bob Jencks	Tight End	Miami (OH)
37	Denver Broncos	Ray Mansfield	Center	Washington
38	Houston Oilers	Don Chuy	Guard	Clemson
39	Boston Patriots	Lou Cioci	Guard	Boston College
40	Kansas City Chiefs	John Campbell	Linebacker	Minnesota

=== Round 6 ===
Pick #	AFL Team	Player	Position	College
41	Oakland Raiders	Butch Wilson	Tight End	Alabama
42	San Diego Chargers	Pat Emerick	Linebacker	Western Michigan
43	New York Jets	Jim Price	Linebacker	Auburn
44	Buffalo Bills	Jim Moss	Linebacker	South Carolina
45	Denver Broncos	Anton Peters	Defensive Tackle	Florida
46	Boston Patriots	Sam Silas	Defensive Tackle	Southern Illinois
47	Houston Oilers	Lionel Aldridge	Defensive End	Utah State
48	Kansas City Chiefs	George Saimes	Defensive Back	Michigan State

=== Round 7 ===
Pick #	AFL Team	Player	Position	College
49	Oakland Raiders	Dave Costa	Defensive Tackle	Utah
50	Denver Broncos ^{(Pick acquired from San Diego)}	Mickey Slaughter	Quarterback	Louisiana Tech
51	New York Jets	Louis Guy	Defensive Back	Mississippi
52	Buffalo Bills	Jim Kanicki	Defensive Tackle	Michigan State
53	Denver Broncos	Paul Flatley	Wide receiver	Northwestern
54	Houston Oilers	Johnny Baker	Linebacker	Mississippi State
55	Boston Patriots	Dick Williamson	End	Alabama
56	Kansas City Chiefs	Bobby Bell	Linebacker	Minnesota

=== Round 8 ===
Pick #	AFL Team	Player	Position	College
57	Oakland Raiders	Roger Locke	End	Arizona State
58	San Diego Chargers	Gene Heeter	Tight End	West Virginia
59	New York Jets	Bill King	Quarterback	Dartmouth
60	Denver Broncos ^{(Pick acquired from Buffalo)}	Hewritt Dixon	Running Back	Florida A&M
61	Denver Broncos	John Griffin	Defensive Back	Memphis
62	Boston Patriots	Rod Foster	Guard	Ohio State
63	Houston Oilers	Jimmy Burson	Defensive Back	Auburn
64	Kansas City Chiefs	John Sklopan	Defensive Back	Southern Mississippi

=== Round 9 ===
Pick #	AFL Team	Player	Position	College
65	Oakland Raiders	Jerry Logan	Defensive Back	West Texas A&M
66	San Diego Chargers	Steve Barnett	Tackle	Oregon
67	New York Jets	Stan Sanders	End	Whittier
68	Buffalo Bills	Larry Stallings	Linebacker	Georgia Tech
69	Denver Broncos	Marv Fleming	Tight End	Utah
70	Houston Oilers	Ed Burke	Tackle	Notre Dame
71	Boston Patriots	Jim Simon	Guard	Miami (FL)
72	Kansas City Chiefs	Jan Barrett	End	Fresno State

=== Round 10 ===
Pick #	AFL Team	Player	Position	College
73	Oakland Raiders	Ray Schoenke	Guard	SMU
74	San Diego Chargers	Don Scott	Tackle	Tampa
75	New York Jets	Tony Liscio	Tackle	Tulsa
76	Buffalo Bills	Ron Snidow	Defensive End	Oregon
77	Denver Broncos	Lonnie Sanders	Defensive Back	Michigan State
78	Denver Broncos ^{(Pick acquired from Boston)}	Pat Richter	Tight End	Wisconsin
79	Boston Patriots ^{(Pick acquired from Houston)}	Don McKinnon	Linebacker	Dartmouth
80	Kansas City Chiefs	Curt Farrier	Defensive Tackle	Montana State

=== Round 11 ===
Pick #	AFL Team	Player	Position	College
81	Kansas City Chiefs ^{(Pick acquired from Oakland)}	Lindy Infante	Halfback	Florida
82	San Diego Chargers	Bob Petrich	Defensive End	West Texas A&M
83	Buffalo Bills ^{(Pick acquired from New York)}	Ron Goodwin	Flanker	Baylor
84	Houston Oilers ^{(Pick acquired from Buffalo)}	Tom Brown	Guard	Pittsburgh
85	Denver Broncos	Billy Joe	Running Back	Villanova
86	Boston Patriots ^{(Pick acquired from Houston)}	Dave Hayes	Fullback	Penn State
87	Boston Patriots	Dave Watson	Guard	Georgia Tech
88	Kansas City Chiefs	Jerrel Wilson	Running Back	Southern Mississippi

=== Round 12 ===
Pick #	AFL Team	Player	Position	College
89	Oakland Raiders	Walt Burden	Linebacker	McNeese State
90	San Diego Chargers	Terry Baker	Quarterback	Oregon State
91	New York Jets	Joe Craver	Linebacker	North Carolina
92	Boston Patriots ^{(Pick acquired from Buffalo)}	Billy Gambrell	Split End	South Carolina
93	Denver Broncos	John Gamble	End	Pacific
94	Boston Patriots	Tim Gauntner	Halfback	John Carroll
95	Oakland Raiders ^{(Pick acquired from Houston)}	Doyle Bransom	Halfback	Southern Oregon
96	New York Jets ^{(Pick acquired from Kansas City)}	Tommy Lucas	End	Texas

=== Round 13 ===
Pick #	AFL Team	Player	Position	College
97	Oakland Raiders	Darnel Haney	End	Utah State
98	San Diego Chargers	Chuck Walton	Guard	Iowa State
99	New York Jets	Olin Hill	Tackle	Furman
100	Boston Patriots ^{(Pick acquired from Buffalo)}	Dave Adams*	Tackle	Arkansas
101	Denver Broncos	Butch Maples	Linebacker	Baylor
102	Oakland Raiders ^{(Pick acquired from Houston)}	Drew Roberts	End	Humboldt State
103	Boston Patriots	Ralph Ferrisi	Fullback	Southern Connecticut State
104	Kansas City Chiefs	Dennis Ward	Guard	Oklahoma

=== Round 14 ===
Pick #	AFL Team	Player	Position	College
105	Kansas City Chiefs ^{(Pick acquired from Oakland)}	Stone Johnson	Halfback	Grambling
106	San Diego Chargers	Frank Lasky*	Tackle	Florida
107	San Diego Chargers ^{(Pick acquired from New York)}	Hatch Rosdahl*	Defensive End	Penn State
108	Buffalo Bills	J.B. Simmons*	End	Tulsa
109	San Diego Chargers ^{(Pick acquired from Denver)}	Jack Cvercko*	Guard	Northwestern
110	Boston Patriots	Whaley Hall*	Tackle	Mississippi
111	Houston Oilers	Don Trull*	Quarterback	Baylor
112	Kansas City Chiefs	Jim (Preacher) Pilot*	Halfback	New Mexico State

=== Round 15 ===
Pick #	AFL Team	Player	Position	College
113	Oakland Raiders	Vern Burke*	Split End	Oregon State
114	San Diego Chargers	Mike Fracchia*	Halfback	Alabama
115	New York Jets	Pete Liske*	Quarterback	Penn State
116	Buffalo Bills	Paul Underhill*	Fullback	Missouri
117	Denver Broncos	Winston Freeman	End	North Texas
118	Houston Oilers	Joe Don Looney	Halfback	Oklahoma
119	Boston Patriots	Bob Dentel	Center	Miami (FL)
120	Kansas City Chiefs	Joe Auer*	Running Back	Georgia Tech

=== Round 16 ===
Pick #	AFL Team	Player	Position	College
121	Oakland Raiders	Jim Moss	Halfback	West Virginia
122	San Diego Chargers	Gene Breen*	Linebacker	Virginia Tech
123	New York Jets	Nick Ryder	Fullback	Miami (FL)
124	Buffalo Bills	Ed Hoerster	Linebacker	Notre Dame
125	Denver Broncos	Dave Crossan	Center	Maryland
126	Boston Patriots	Wes Bryant	Tackle	Arkansas
127	Houston Oilers	Rex Benson*	Tackle	Miami (FL)
128	Kansas City Chiefs	Mel Profit*	End	UCLA

=== Round 17 ===
Pick #	AFL Team	Player	Position	College
129	Oakland Raiders	John Murio	Halfback	Whitworth
130	San Diego Chargers	Dick Drummond*	Halfback	George Washington
131	New York Jets	Charley Johnson	Guard	Villanova
132	Buffalo Bills	Jeff Slabaugh	Tackle	Indiana
133	Denver Broncos	Bob Paremore	Halfback	Florida A&M
134	Houston Oilers	Jerry Griffin	End	Louisiana Tech
135	Boston Patriots	Tom Neumann	Halfback	Northern Michigan
136	Kansas City Chiefs	Billy Moore	Quarterback	Arkansas

=== Round 18 ===
Pick #	AFL Team	Player	Position	College
137	Oakland Raiders	Terry Dillon	Defensive Back	Montana
138	Oakland Raiders ^{(Pick acquired from San Diego)}	George Hogan	Guard	Texas A&M
139	New York Jets	Bill Munsey	Halfback	Minnesota
140	Buffalo Bills	Herb Paterra	Linebacker	Michigan State
141	Denver Broncos	Charley Mitchell	Halfback	Washington
142	Boston Patriots	Dave O'Brien	Tackle	Boston College
143	Houston Oilers	Paul Lea	Halfback	Oklahoma
144	Kansas City Chiefs	Bill Freeman	Tackle	Southern Mississippi

=== Round 19 ===
Pick #	AFL Team	Player	Position	College
145	Oakland Raiders	Tony Fiorentino	Guard	UCLA
146	San Diego Chargers	Ernie Park*	Guard	McMurry
147	New York Jets	Gary Kroner	Defensive Back	Wisconsin
148	Buffalo Bills	Eugene Sykes	Defensive Back	LSU
149	Denver Broncos	Frank Baker	Fullback	Toledo
150	Houston Oilers	Bob Hoover	Halfback	Florida
151	Boston Patriots	Pat McCarthy	Quarterback	Holy Cross
152	Kansas City Chiefs	Bruce Starling	Defensive Back	Florida

=== Round 20 ===
Pick #	AFL Team	Player	Position	College
153	Oakland Raiders	Rex Mirich*	Defensive Tackle	Northern Arizona
154	San Diego Chargers	Buddy Soefker*	Linebacker	LSU
155	New York Jets	John Johnson	Defensive Tackle	Indiana
156	Buffalo Bills	Harlow Fullwood	Tackle	Virginia
157	Denver Broncos	Dan Grimm	Guard	Colorado
158	Boston Patriots	Jim Bradshaw	Defensive Back	Tennessee-Chattanooga
159	Houston Oilers	Wayne Lee	Center	Oklahoma
160	Kansas City Chiefs	Lowell Vaught*	Tackle	Louisiana-Lafayette

=== Round 21 ===
Pick #	AFL Team	Player	Position	College
161	Oakland Raiders	Neal Petties*	End	San Diego State
162	San Diego Chargers	Dan Points*	Tackle	Cincinnati
163	New York Jets	Ron Vander Kelen	Quarterback	Wisconsin
164	Buffalo Bills	Ed Adamchik*	Center	Pittsburgh
165	Denver Broncos	Ross Nolan	End	Louisiana-Monroe
166	Houston Oilers	Staley Faulkner*	Tackle	Texas
167	Boston Patriots	Gary Sherman	Back	Bowling Green
168	Kansas City Chiefs	Ernie Borghetti*	Tackle	Pittsburgh

=== Round 22 ===
Pick #	AFL Team	Player	Position	College
169	Oakland Raiders	Hugh Campbell	End	Washington State
170	San Diego Chargers	Roger Gill*	Wide Receiver	Texas Tech
171	New York Jets	Bill Thornton	Fullback	Nebraska
172	Buffalo Bills	Chuck Walker*	Defensive Tackle	Duke
173	Denver Broncos	Dave Mathieson*	Quarterback	Washington State
174	Boston Patriots	Nate Craddock	Fullback	Parsons College
175	Houston Oilers	Sam Byer	Fullback	Texas A&M
176	Kansas City Chiefs	John Maczuzak*	Defensive Tackle	Pittsburgh

=== Round 23 ===
Pick #	AFL Team	Player	Position	College
177	Oakland Raiders	Jon Anabo	Quarterback	Fresno State
178	San Diego Chargers	Paul Watters*	Tackle	Miami (OH)
179	New York Jets	Lou Rettino	Fullback	Villanova
180	Buffalo Bills	Bob Middleton	End	Ohio State
181	Denver Broncos	Billy Joe Moody	Halfback	Arkansas
182	Houston Oilers	Gene Raesz	End	Rice
183	Boston Patriots	Al Snyder	Wide Receiver	Holy Cross
184	Kansas City Chiefs	Dave Adams*	Guard	Arkansas

=== Round 24 ===
Pick #	AFL Team	Player	Position	College
185	Oakland Raiders	Dick Peters	Tackle	Whittier
186	San Diego Chargers	Bill Frank	Tackle	Colorado
187	New York Jets	Lowell Caylor	Defensive Back	Miami (OH)
188	Buffalo Bills	Daryle Lamonica	Quarterback	Notre Dame
189	Denver Broncos	C.B. Simons	Linebacker	Stanford
190	Boston Patriots	Dick Schulz	Tackle	Ohio
191	Houston Oilers	Bob Burton	Tackle	Grambling State
192	Kansas City Chiefs	Dave Hill	Tackle	Auburn

=== Round 25 ===
Pick #	AFL Team	Player	Position	College
193	Oakland Raiders	Bill McFarland	Fullback	Oklahoma State
194	San Diego Chargers	Jerry Mazzanti	Defensive End	Arkansas
195	New York Jets	Joe Baughan	Tackle	Auburn
196	Buffalo Bills	Ron Carlson	End	Wisconsin
197	Denver Broncos	Forest Farmer	Linebacker	Purdue
198	Houston Oilers	Gary Kaltenbach	Tackle	Pittsburgh
199	Boston Patriots	Dennis Gaubatz	Linebacker	LSU
200	Kansas City Chiefs	John Hughes	Guard	SMU

=== Round 26 ===
Pick #	AFL Team	Player	Position	College
201	Oakland Raiders	Dennis Claridge*	Quarterback	Nebraska
202	San Diego Chargers	Ken Dill*	Center	Mississippi
203	New York Jets	Terry Monaghan*	Tackle	Penn State
204	Buffalo Bills	Willis Crenshaw*	Running Back	Kansas State
205	Denver Broncos	Monte Day*	Tackle	Fresno State
206	Boston Patriots	Jim Tullis*	Halfback	Florida A&M
207	Houston Oilers	Dave Theisen*	Halfback	Nebraska
208	Kansas City Chiefs	Tumley Todd*	Center	Virginia

=== Round 27 ===
Pick #	AFL Team	Player	Position	College
209	Oakland Raiders	Dick Skelly*	Halfback	Florida
210	San Diego Chargers	Harry Butsko*	Linebacker	Maryland
211	New York Jets	Dave Herman	Guard	Michigan State
212	Buffalo Bills	Dick Quast*	Guard	Memphis
213	Denver Broncos	John Sellers*	Tackle	Bakersfield JC
214	Houston Oilers	Al Hildebrand*	Tackle	Stanford
215	Boston Patriots	Dave Adams*	Tackle	Arkansas
216	Kansas City Chiefs	Billy Clay*	End	Arkansas

=== Round 28 ===
Pick #	AFL Team	Player	Position	College
217	Oakland Raiders	Larry Campbell*	Fullback	Utah State
218	San Diego Chargers	Steve Berzansky*	Fullback	West Virginia
219	New York Jets	Mike Taliaferro*	Quarterback	Illinois
220	Buffalo Bills	Leon Mavity*	Halfback	Colorado
221	Denver Broncos	Bill Redell*	Halfback	Occidental
222	Boston Patriots	Ron Whaley*	Halfback	Tennessee-Chattanooga
223	Houston Oilers	Tim Stein*	Center	Miami (OH)
224	Kansas City Chiefs	Gordon Scarborough*	End	Texas A&M-Commerce

=== Round 29 ===
Pick #	AFL Team	Player	Position	College
225	Oakland Raiders	Dick Anderson*	End	Penn State
226	San Diego Chargers	Herman Hamp*	Halfback	Fresno State
227	New York Jets	Paul Wicker*	Tackle	Fresno State
228	Buffalo Bills	Charlie Killett*	Halfback	Memphis
229	Denver Broncos	Kern Carson*	Halfback	San Diego State
230	Houston Oilers	Oliver Ross*	Tackle	West Texas A&M
231	Boston Patriots	Dick Kelly*	Guard	Georgia
232	Kansas City Chiefs	John Sisk*	Defensive Back	Miami (FL)

* This pick was considered a "Future" selection.

== Notable undrafted players ==
^{†}	= Pro Bowler	‡	= Hall of Famer

Original NFL team	Player	Pos.	College	Notes
Buffalo Bills	Ed Rutkowski ^{†}	WR/CB	Notre Dame	
Denver Broncos	Don Breaux	QB	McNeese State	
Houston Oilers	Willie Brown^{‡}	CB	Grambling State	
New York Jets	Bill Baird	CB	San Francisco State	
New York Jets	Winston Hill^{‡}	T	Jackson State	
New York Jets	Warren Powers	S	Nebraska	
Oakland Raiders	Ken Herock	TE	West Virginia	
San Diego Chargers	Dick Westmoreland ^{†}	S	North Carolina A&T	

== See also ==
- List of American Football League players
- History of American Football League draft
- List of professional American football drafts
