= Poth High School =

Location
- 506 North Dickson Street; Poth, Texas 78147-0250; United States; 29°04′31″N 98°04′55″W

Information
- School type: Public high school
- School district: Poth Independent School District
- Principal: Todd Deaver
- Staff: 25.24 (FTE)
- Grades: 9-12
- Enrollment: 287 (2023-2024)
- Student to teacher ratio: 11.37
- Colors: Navy blue and gold
- Athletics conference: UIL Class 3A
- Mascot: Pirate/Pirette
- Yearbook: The Log
- Website: phs.pothisd.us

Poth High School is a public high school located in Poth, Texas (USA), and classified as a 3A school by the UIL. It is part of the Poth Independent School District located in south central Wilson County. In 2015, the school was rated "Met Standard" by the Texas Education Agency.

== Controversy ==
In February 2020, the district refused to allow a student, Newt Johnson, to remain in classes if he continued to grow his hair out to possibly make a wig for his sick sister. Superintendent Paula Renken alleged the matter was not about an ill person but rather enforcing the school board's rules. With the support of his parents, Johnson left the school.

== Athletics ==
The Poth Pirates compete in these sports:

- Baseball
- Basketball
- Cross country
- American football
- Golf
- Powerlifting
- Softball
- Tennis
- Track and field
- Volleyball

=== State titles ===
- Girls' basketball
  - 1997(2A), 2007(2A)
- Volleyball
  - 1995(1A), 1996(2A), 1997(2A), 2004(2A), 2005(2A), 2006(2A), 2009(2A), 2011(2A), 2014(3A)
