= Ed Hoerster =

American gridiron football player (born 1941)

No. 54
- Positions: Centre, Guard

Personal information
- Born: October 12, 1941 (age 85); Chicago, Illinois, U.S.
- Listed height: 6 ft 2 in (1.88 m)
- Listed weight: 230 lb (104 kg)

Career history
- 1963–1964: Toronto Argonauts
- 1964–1965: Hamilton Tiger-Cats
- 1965: Saskatchewan Roughriders

Awards and highlights
- Grey Cup champion (1965)

Edward H. Hoerster (born October 12, 1941) was an American professional football player who played for the Hamilton Tiger-Cats, Toronto Argonauts, and Saskatchewan Roughriders. He won the Grey Cup with the Tiger-Cats in 1965. Hoerster retired with his wife Judy, his 4 children, and 8 grandchildren. He played college football at the University of Notre Dame and was selected by the Chicago Bears in the 1963 NFL draft (Round 6, #137). Hoerster now plays golf in his free time.
