= Poth, Texas =

- City
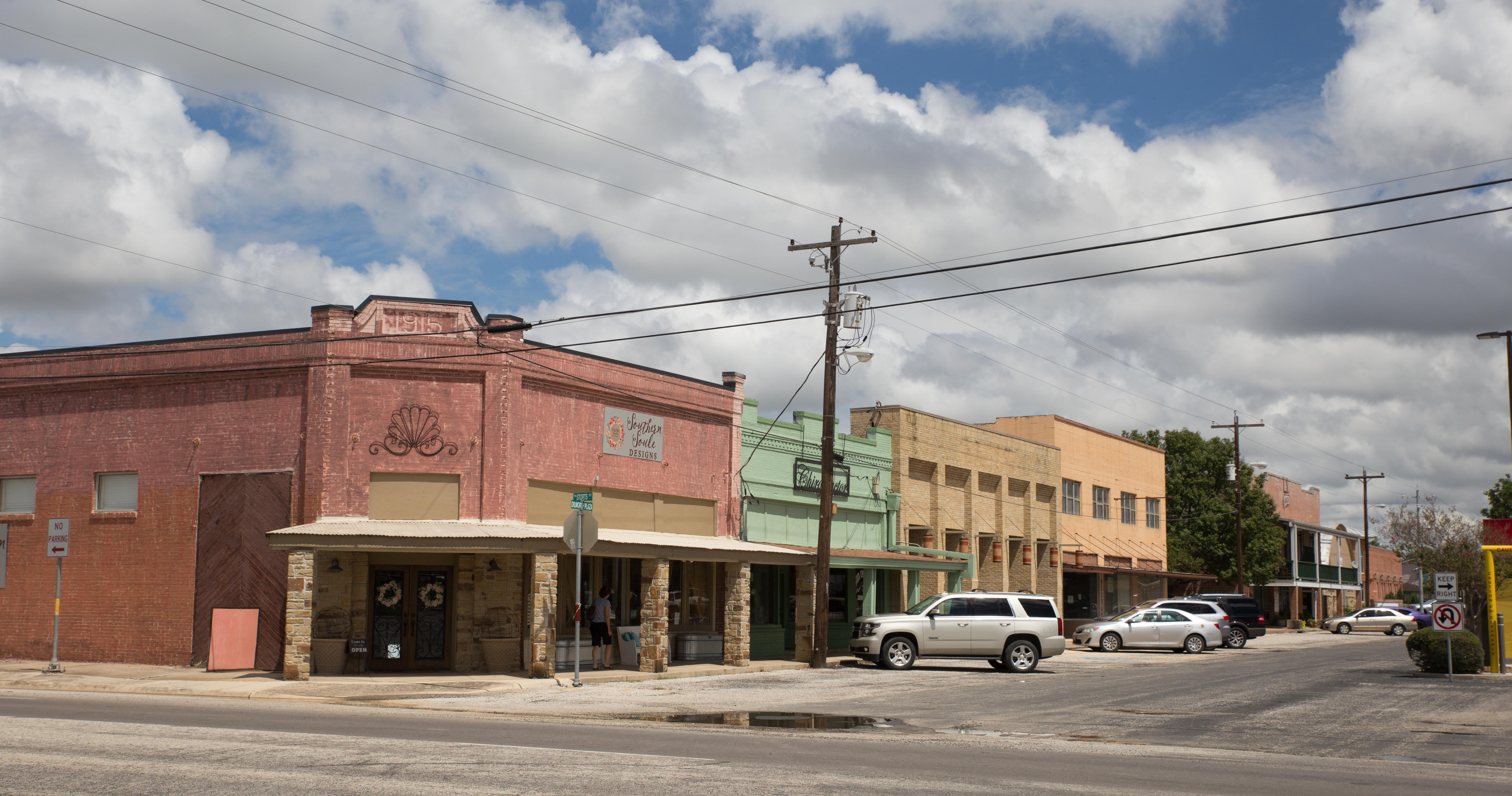
- Downtown Poth, Texas

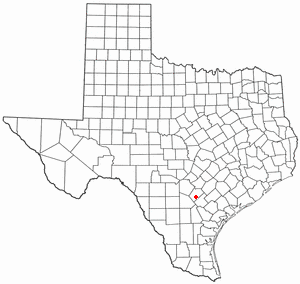
- Location of Poth, Texas

- Coordinates: 29°04′21″N 98°04′51″W
- Country: United States
- State: Texas
- County: Wilson

Area
  - Total: 3.19 sq mi (8.26 km^{2})
  - Land: 3.17 sq mi (8.20 km^{2})
  - Water: 0.023 sq mi (0.06 km^{2})
- Elevation: 404 ft (123 m)

Population (2020)
  - Total: 1,819
  - Density: 721.4/sq mi (278.52/km^{2})
- Time zone: UTC-6 (Central (CST))
  - Summer (DST): UTC-5 (CDT)
- ZIP code: 78147
- Area code: 830
- FIPS code: 48-59096
- GNIS feature ID: 2412502
- Website: Official website

Poth (/poʊθ/ POHTH) is a city in Wilson County, Texas, United States. The population was 1,819 at the 2020 census. It is part of the San Antonio metropolitan area.

== Geography ==
According to the United States Census Bureau, the city has a total area of 3.2 square miles (8.3 km^{2}), all land. This is approximately 35 mi (56 km) southeast of Downtown San Antonio.

== Demographics ==
Historical population
Census	Pop.	Note	%±
1940	509		—
1950	1,089		113.9%
1960	1,119		2.8%
1970	1,296		15.8%
1980	1,461		12.7%
1990	1,642		12.4%
2000	1,850		12.7%
2010	1,908		3.1%
2020	1,819		−4.7%
U.S. Decennial Census

Poth racial composition as of 2020 (NH = Non-Hispanic) (Note: Note: the US Census treats Hispanic/Latino as an ethnic category. This table excludes Latinos from the racial categories and assigns them to a separate category. Hispanics/Latinos can be of any race.)
Race	Number	Percentage
White (NH)	748	41.12%
Black or African American (NH)	7	0.38%
Native American or Alaska Native (NH)	2	0.11%
Asian (NH)	4	0.22%
Some Other Race (NH)	9	0.49%
Mixed/Multi-Racial (NH)	20	1.1%
Hispanic or Latino	1,029	56.57%
Total	1,819	

As of the 2020 United States census, there were 1,819 people, 504 households, and 433 families residing in the city.

At the 2000 census there were 1,850 people, 623 households, and 490 families in the city. The population density was 579.7 inhabitants per square mile (223.8/km^{2}). There were 663 housing units at an average density of 207.7 per square mile (80.2/km^{2}). The racial makeup of the city was 66.43% White, 0.43% African American, 0.92% Native American, 0.16% Asian, 29.08% from other races, and 2.97% multiracial. Hispanic or Latino of any race were 56.65%.

There were 623 households, of which 41.6% had children under the age of 18 living with them, 63.9% were married couples living together, 10.6% had a female head of household with no husband present, and 21.3% were non-families. Individuals made up 19.6% of all households, and 10.6% were one person aged 65 or older. The average household size was 2.97 and the average family size was 3.41.

The age distribution was: 31.1% under the age of 18, 9.2% from 18 to 24, 28.9% from 25 to 44, 18.8% from 45 to 64, and 12.1% 65 or older. The median age was 33 years. For every 100 females, there were 100.4 males. For every 100 females age 18 and over, there were 92.6 males.

The median household income was $35,492 and the median family income was $42,279. Males had a median income of $30,885 versus $21,563 for females. The per capita income for the city was $13,910. About 15.5% of families and 18.1% of the population were below the poverty line, including 20.5% of those under age 18 and 23.3% of those age 65 or over.

The most common occupation for males living in the Poth area is construction, followed by food service, and then occupations in the agricultural industry. The most common occupational industry for females living in Poth is health care, followed by educational services, and then food services.

== Education ==
The south central Wilson County area is served by the Poth Independent School District, which enrolls students from prekindergarten through twelfth grade. There is one elementary school, one middle school, and one high school (Poth High School) within Poth ISD.

== History ==
The city was originally named Marcelina when it was established in 1886 for employees of the railway between San Antonio and Aransas Pass, but renamed in 1901 for Arnold H. Poth, who owned a cotton processing business.

In 1970, the city made national news when almost all of its citizens (more than 1,100 out of 1,296) agreed to be inoculated with the oral polio vaccine when one of the city's children contracted polio.
