= Lake Ming =

Lake in Bakersfield, California, United States

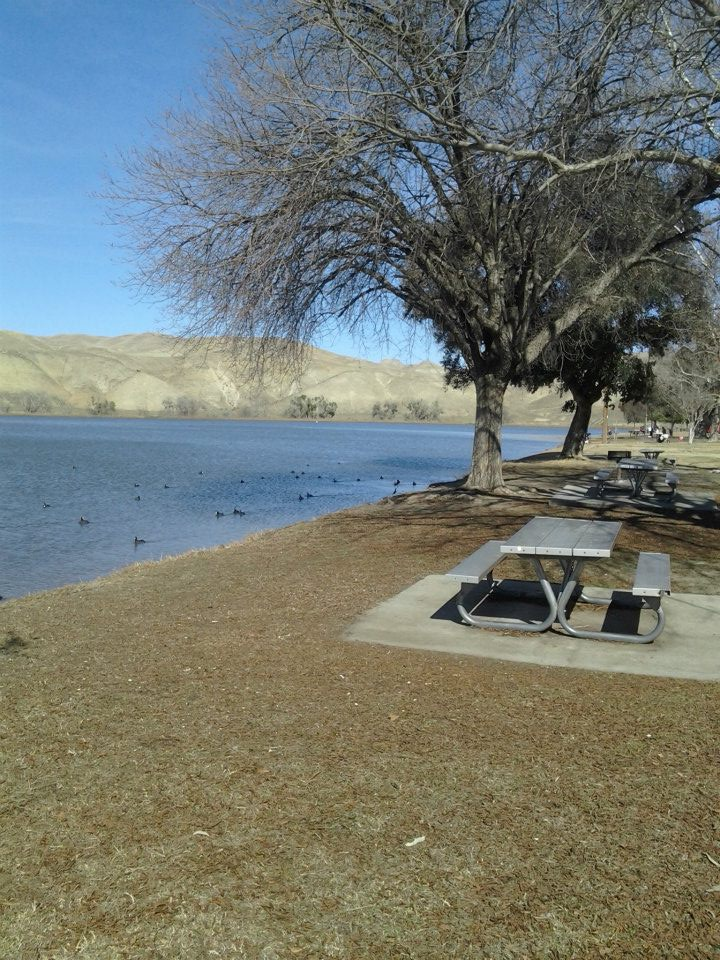
- Lake Ming, California in February 2012.

- Location within California Location within the United States
- Location: Kern County, California
- Coordinates: 35°26′24″N 118°51′58″W
- Type: Artificial
- Primary inflows: Kern River
- Primary outflows: Kern River
- Built: 1959
- Max. length: 4,700 ft (1,400 m)
- Surface area: 104 acres (42 ha)
- Surface elevation: 518 ft (158 m)
- Settlements: Bakersfield, California

Lake Ming is a man-made recreational lake located in Bakersfield, California. It is primarily a motorboat and water-skiing lake, although sailboats are allowed the second full weekend each month, and every Tuesday and Thursday after 1:30 pm. Lake Ming also has fishing and the Department of Fish and Wildlife stocks the lake with 10 to 12 inches (25 to 30 cm) rainbow trout during the winter months. The primary fishes are large-mouth bass, catfish, crappie, bluegill, carp and stocked rainbow trout. Lake Ming is a part of the Kern River County Park. The National Jet Boat Association holds races at the lake throughout the year.

== History ==
Lake Ming is formed by the Kern River County Park Dam on a branch of the Kern River, in Kern County, California. The reservoir was created in 1959, and named after Kern County Supervisor Floyd Ming.

== Description ==
Lake Ming is a reservoir used for recreation purposes and owned by the Kern County Parks and Recreation Department. Its height is 18 feet (5.5 m) with a length of 4,700 feet (1,400 m). Normal storage is 790 acre-feet (970 dam^{3}). It drains an area of 0.6 square miles (1.6 km^{2}). It has a surface area of 104 acres (42 ha). Other facilities located at the lake include picnic areas, restrooms, drinking fountains, and parking around the southern end. There is also playground equipment at the southeast end of the lake. There is also an additional large picnic area located on top of a small hill east of the lake. Further east is a 28-acre (11 ha) campground. It has 50 camp sites, each containing a picnic table and fire ring. A dump site and restroom are also available.

== See also ==
- List of lakes in California
