= 1963 All-Pro Team =

The following is a list of players that were named to the Associated Press National Football League's All-Pro Team in 1963.

Players from the first and second teams are listed, with players from the first team in bold, where applicable.

== Teams ==
Offense
| Position | Players |
|---|---|
| Quarterbacks | **Y. A. Tittle**, New York Giants Johnny Unitas, Baltimore Colts |
| Running backs | **Tommy Mason**, Minnesota Vikings **Jim Brown**, Cleveland Browns; Tom Moore, Green Bay Packers; Jim Taylor, Green Bay Packers |
| Wide receivers | **Bobby Joe Conrad**, St. Louis Cardinals (Flanker) **Del Shofner**, New York Giants (Split End); Terry Barr, Detroit Lions (Flanker); Bobby Mitchell, Washington Redskins; Gail Cogdill, Detroit Lions (Split End); Buddy Dial, Pittsburgh Steelers (Split End); Sonny Randle, St. Louis Cardinals (Split End) |
| Tight ends | **Mike Ditka**, Chicago Bears Ron Kramer, Green Bay; Pete Retzlaff, Philadelphia Eagles |
| Tackles | **Dick Schafrath**, Left, Cleveland Browns **Forrest Gregg**, Right, Green Bay Packers; Charlie Bradshaw, Left, Pittsburgh Steelers; Rosey Brown, Left, New York Giants; Bob St. Clair, Right, San Francisco 49ers Bob Wetoska, Right, Chicago Bears |
| Guards | **Jim Parker**, Left, Baltimore Colts **Jerry Kramer**, Right, Green Bay Packers; Darrell Dess, Left, New York Giants; Fuzzy Thurston, Left, Green Bay Packers; John Gordy, Right, Detroit Lions; Ken Gray, Right, St. Louis Cardinals |
| Centers | **Jim Ringo**, Green Bay Packers Buzz Nutter, Pittsburgh Steelers; Mike Pyle, Chicago Bears |

Defense
| Position | Players |
|---|---|
| Defensive ends | **Jim Katcavage**, Left, New York Giants **Doug Atkins**, Right, Chicago Bears; Willie Davis, Left, Green Bay Packers; Gino Marchetti, Baltimore Colts; Bill Glass, Cleveland Browns |
| Defensive tackles | **Roger Brown**, Right, Detroit Lions **Henry Jordan**, Right, Green Bay Packers; Bob Gain, Left, Cleveland Browns; Dick Modzelewski, Left, New York Giants; Merlin Olsen, Left, Los Angeles Rams; Rosey Grier, Right, Los Angeles Rams; Luke Owens, Right, St. Louis Cardinals |
| Outside Linebackers | **Joe Fortunato**, Left, Chicago Bears **Jack Pardee**, Right, Los Angeles Rams; Dan Currie, Left, Green Bay Packers; Chuck Howley, Left, Dallas Cowboys; Bill Forester, Green Bay Packers; Bill Koman, St. Louis Cardinals; Larry Morris, Chicago Bears; Wayne H. Walker, Detroit Lions |
| Middle Linebackers | **Bill George**, Chicago Bears Rip Hawkins, Minnesota Vikings; Sam Huff, New York Giants; Ray Nitschke, Green Bay Packers; Myron Pottios, Pittsburgh Steelers |
| Cornerbacks | **Herb Adderly**, Left, Green Bay Packers **Dick Lynch**, Right, New York Giants; Dick "Night Train" Lane, Left, Detroit Lions; Eddie Meador, Left, Los Angeles Rams; Jimmy Hill, Right, St. Louis Cardinals; Abe Woodson, Right, San Francisco 49ers |
| Safety | **Richie Petitbon**, Left, Chicago Bears **Roosevelt Taylor**, Right, Chicago Bears; Clendon Thomas, Left, Pittsburgh Steelers; Yale Lary, Right, Detroit Lions; Jimmy Patton, Right New York Giants; Larry Wilson, Right, St. Louis Cardinals; Willie Wood, Right, Green Bay Packers |

Special teams
| Position | Players |
|---|---|
| Returners | **Timmy Brown**, Philadelphia Eagles |
