= 1963 Minnesota Vikings season =

NFL team season

- General manager: Bert Rose
- Head coach: Norm Van Brocklin
- Home stadium: Metropolitan Stadium

Results
- Record: 5–8–1
- Division place: 4th (tied) NFL Western
- Playoffs: Did not qualify
- All-Pros: RB Tommy Mason (1st team); LB Rip Hawkins (2nd team)
- Pro Bowlers: RB Tommy Mason; T Grady Alderman; LB Rip Hawkins

Uniform
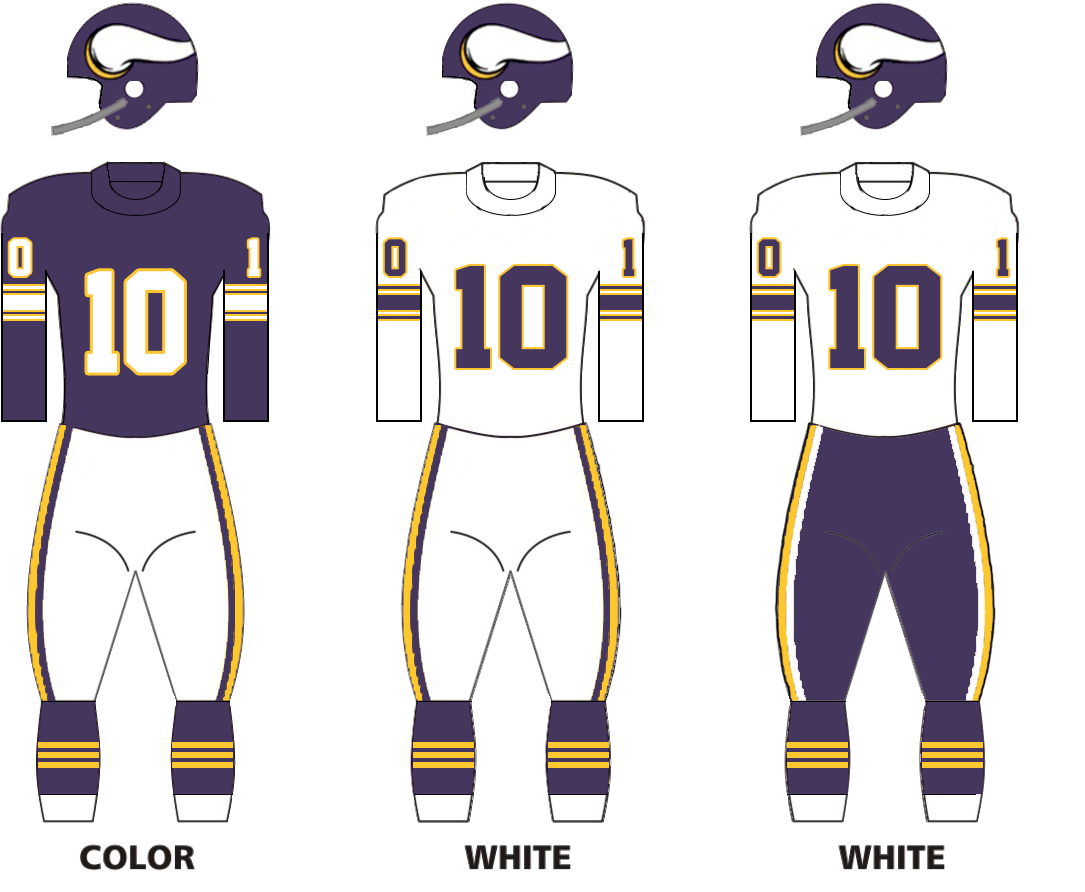

The 1963 season was the Minnesota Vikings' third in the National Football League (NFL). Under head coach Norm Van Brocklin, the team finished with a 5–8–1 record. Five wins in a season represented the most in the franchise's three-year history. 22-year-old Paul Flatley of Northwestern University was named the NFL's Rookie of the Year, a first for the fledgling franchise.

== Offseason ==
=== 1963 draft ===
Pro Bowler
Hall of Famer

1963 Minnesota Vikings Draft
Draft order		Player name	Position	College	Notes
Round	Selection	Player name	Position	College	Notes
1	3	Jim Dunaway	Defensive tackle	Ole Miss	
2	16	Bobby Bell	Defensive tackle	Minnesota	
3	31	Ray Poage	Running back	Texas	
4	44	Paul Flatley	Wide receiver	Northwestern	
5	59	Gary Kaltenbach	Offensive tackle	Pittsburgh	
6	72	Traded to the Cleveland Browns (Note: The Vikings traded their sixth-round selection (72nd overall) to the Browns in exchange for CB Tom Franckhauser, OT Errol Linden, TE Charley Ferguson and K Fred Cox.)			
7	87	Traded to the New York Giants (Note: The Vikings traded their seventh-round selection (87th overall) to the Giants in exchange for DE/LB Jim Leo.)			
8	100	Jim O'Mahoney	Linebacker	Miami (FL)	
9	115	Bob Hoover	Running back	Florida	
10	128	Terry Kosens	Running back	Hofstra	
11	143	John Campbell	Linebacker	Minnesota	
12	156	John Sklopan	Running back	Southern Miss	
13	171	Dave O'Brien	Offensive tackle	Boston College	
14	184	Ralph Ferrisi	Running back	Southern Connecticut	
15	199	John Murio	End	Whitworth	
16	212	Rex Mirich	Offensive tackle	Arizona State–Flagstaff	
17	227	Tom Munsey	Running back	Concord	
18	240	Tom McIntyre	Offensive tackle	St. John's (MN)	
19	255	Frank Horvath	Running back	Youngstown	
20	268	Mailon Kent	Running back	Auburn	

== Roster ==
1963 Minnesota Vikings roster
Quarterbacks (QB): 10 Fran Tarkenton; 11 Ron Vander Kelen; Running backs (RB): 30 Bill Brown; 22 Bill Butler; 35 Bob Ferguson; 20 Tommy Mason; 24 Tommy Wilson; Wide receivers (WR): 80 Jim Boylan; 85 Paul Flatley; 89 Jerry Reichow; Tight ends (TE): 87 Gordon Smith	Offensive linemen (OL): 67 Grady Alderman T; 63 Jim Battle G; 61 Larry Bowie G; 65 Gerry Huth G; 73 Errol Linden T; 74 Dave O'Brien T; 53 Mick Tingelhoff C; Defensive linemen (DL): 62 Bob Denton DE; 76 Paul Dickson DT; 83 Don Hultz DE; 70 Jim Marshall DE; 79 Jim Prestel DT; 75 Pat Russ DT	Linebackers (LB): 55 John Campbell OLB; 58 Rip Hawkins MLB; 57 Bill Jobko OLB; 82 Steve Stonebreaker OLB; 60 Roy Winston OLB; Defensive backs (DB): 23 Lee Calland CB; 25 Terry Dillon FS; 40 Tom Franckhauser FS; 29 Karl Kassulke SS; 26 Terry Kosens SS; 21 Chuck Lamson SS; 45 Ed Sharockman CB; Special teams (ST): 14 Fred Cox K/P	Practice squad: Jim O'Mahoney LB; Reserve: -- Terry Cagaanan RB (IR); 81 Leon Clarke TE (IR); 86 Ray Poage TE (IR); 27 Bobby Reed RB (IR); Rookies in italics

== Preseason ==
Week	Date	Opponent	Result	Record	Venue	Attendance
1	August 10	San Francisco 49ers	W 43–28	1–0	Multnomah Stadium (Portland, OR)	20,837
2	August 17	at Los Angeles Rams	W 27–3	2–0	Los Angeles Memorial Coliseum	42,966
3	August 25	New York Giants	W 17–16	3–0	Metropolitan Stadium	29,815
4	August 31	Philadelphia Eagles	L 27–34	3–1	Hershey Stadium (Hershey, PA)	15,861
5	September 6	at St. Louis Cardinals	W 35–0	4–1	Busch Stadium	30,842

== Regular season ==
=== Schedule ===
Week	Date	Opponent	Result	Record	Venue	Attendance
1	September 15	at San Francisco 49ers	W 24–20	1–0	Kezar Stadium	30,781
2	September 22	Chicago Bears	L 7–28	1–1	Metropolitan Stadium	33,923
3	September 29	San Francisco 49ers	W 45–14	2–1	Metropolitan Stadium	28,567
4	October 6	St. Louis Cardinals	L 14–56	2–2	Metropolitan Stadium	30,220
5	October 13	Green Bay Packers	L 28–37	2–3	Metropolitan Stadium	42,567
6	October 20	at Los Angeles Rams	L 24–27	2–4	Los Angeles Memorial Coliseum	30,555
7	October 27	at Detroit Lions	L 10–28	2–5	Tiger Stadium	44,509
8	November 3	Los Angeles Rams	W 21–13	3–5	Metropolitan Stadium	33,567
9	November 10	at Green Bay Packers	L 7–28	3–6	City Stadium	42,327
10	November 17	Baltimore Colts	L 34–37	3–7	Metropolitan Stadium	33,136
11	November 24	Detroit Lions	W 34–31	4–7	Metropolitan Stadium	28,763
12	December 1	at Chicago Bears	T 17–17	4–7–1	Wrigley Field	47,249
13	December 8	at Baltimore Colts	L 10–41	4–8–1	Memorial Stadium	54,122
14	December 15	at Philadelphia Eagles	W 34–13	5–8–1	Franklin Field	57,403

=== Game summaries ===
==== Week 2: vs Chicago Bears ====
Week 2: Chicago Bears at Minnesota Vikings

Quarter	1	2	3	4	Total
Bears	7	7	0	14	28
Vikings	0	7	0	0	7

at Metropolitan Stadium, Bloomington, Minnesota

- Date: September 22
- Game weather: 51 °F (11 °C)
- Game attendance: 33,923
- Pro-Football-Reference.com

Game information

First quarter

- CHI – Ronnie Bull 24-yard pass from Bill Wade (Bob Jencks kick). Bears 7–0.

Second quarter

- MIN – Jerry Reichow 24-yard pass from Fran Tarkenton (Fred Cox kick). Tie 7–7.
- CHI – Mike Ditka 36-yard pass from Bill Wade (Bob Jencks kick). Bears 14–7.

Third quarter

- No scoring plays.

Fourth quarter

- CHI – Bill Wade 1-yard run (Bob Jencks kick). Bears 21–7.
- CHI – Mike Ditka 10-yard pass from Bill Wade (Bob Jencks kick). Bears 28–7.

Top passers

- CHI – Bill Wade – 23/32, 253 yards, 3 TD
- MIN – Fran Tarkenton – 13/22, 167 yards, TD, 3 INT

Top rushers

- CHI – Rick Casares – 7 rushes, 53 yards
- MIN – Tommy Mason – 11 rushes, 60 yards

Top receivers

- CHI – Mike Ditka – 8 receptions, 124 yards, 2 TD
- MIN – Ray Poage – 5 receptions, 67 yards

=== Standings ===
NFL Western Conference
	W	L	T	PCT	CONF	PF	PA	STK
Chicago Bears	11	1	2	.917	10–1–1	301	144	W2
Green Bay Packers	11	2	1	.846	9–2–1	369	206	W2
Baltimore Colts	8	6	0	.571	7–5	316	285	W3
Detroit Lions	5	8	1	.385	4–7–1	326	265	L1
Minnesota Vikings	5	8	1	.385	4–7–1	309	390	W1
Los Angeles Rams	5	9	0	.357	5–7	210	350	L2
San Francisco 49ers	2	12	0	.143	1–11	198	391	L5

Note: Tie games were not officially counted in the standings until 1972.

== Postseason ==
For the first time, the Vikings had starters in the East–West Pro Bowl, played January 12, 1964, at the Los Angeles Memorial Coliseum and won by the West squad. Halfback Tommy Mason, linebacker Rip Hawkins and tackle Grady Alderman each were voted to start on the West team coached by the Chicago Bears' George Halas.

Wide receiver Paul Flatley, who led the team in receiving yards and receiving touchdowns, was named as the 1963 Rookie of the Year by the Associated Press (AP), United Press International (UPI) and The Sporting News (TSN).

Halfback Tommy Mason, in his third year, was named first-team All-Pro by the AP, UPI, TSN, the Newspaper Enterprise Association and the New York Daily News.

Middle linebacker Rip Hawkins was named second-team All-Pro by the UPI.

== Statistics ==
=== Team leaders ===
Category	Player(s)	Value
Passing yards	Fran Tarkenton	2,311
Passing touchdowns	Fran Tarkenton	15
Rushing yards	Tommy Mason	763
Rushing touchdowns	Tommy Mason	7
Receiving yards	Paul Flatley	867
Receiving touchdowns	Paul Flatley	4
Points	Fred Cox	75
Kickoff return yards	Bill Butler	713
Punt return yards	Bill Butler	220
Interceptions	Ed Sharockman	5
Sacks	Don Hultz, Jim Marshall	10.5

Note that sack totals from 1960 to 1981 are considered unofficial by the NFL.

=== League rankings ===
Category	Total yards	Yards per game	NFL rank (out of 14)
Passing offense	2,169	154.9	12th
Rushing offense	1,733	123.8	4th
Total offense	4,011	286.5	11th
Passing defense	2,998	214.1	10th
Rushing defense	1,733	123.8	7th
Total defense	4,731	337.9	9th
