= California Sports Hall of Fame =

The California Sports Hall of Fame recognizes athletes, coaches, and members of sports media who have made a "lasting impression to California sports". It was established in 2006 by Christian Okoye, former running back for the Kansas City Chiefs. The California Sports Hall of Fame made its first Induction in January 2007. Okoye was inducted in 2017

== History ==
California Sports Hall of Fame has no permanent headquarters yet. It had been reported in 2011 that the Ontario Convention Center would serve as its headquarters for the "next decade". In June 2023, the Ontario Convention Center hosted a gala to commemorate the new inductees into the hall of fame.

After he was inducted into the Missouri Sports Hall of Fame, Christian Okoye approached the late Bill Walsh, Tommy Lasorda and coach John Wooden to help establish a Hall of Fame in California. 19 Sports heroes were then inducted in the inaugural ceremony.

== Inductees ==
=== 2007 ===
- Marcus Allen
- Elgin Baylor
- Wilt Chamberlain
- Eric Dickerson
- Tom Flores
- Chick Hearn
- Reggie Jackson
- Magic Johnson
- Rafer Johnson
- Deacon Jones
- Jackie Joyner-Kersee
- Tommy Lasorda
- Bob Mathias
- Jim Plunkett
- Jackie Robinson
- Bill Walsh
- Jerry West
- Kellen Winslow
- John Wooden

=== 2008 ===
- De La Salle High School football
- Dan Fouts
- Cheryl Miller
- Willie Mays
- Don Quarrie
- Vin Scully
- UCLA Bruins basketball
- Dave Winfield

=== 2009 ===
- Steve Garvey
- Rosey Grier
- Karch Kiraly
- Ann Meyers-Drysdale
- Jim Murray
- Mike Powell

=== 2010 ===
- Fred Biletnikoff
- Jim Hill
- Billie Jean King
- Merlin Olsen
- Jim Otto
- Sinjin Smith
- Dwight Stones
- Bill Walton

=== 2011 ===
- Mike Haynes
- Tony Lopez
- Bob Miller
- Ken Norton
- Dick Vermeil

=== 2012 ===
- Rick Barry
- John Carlos
- Marcel Dionne
- Ted Hendricks
- Anthony Muñoz
- Tommie Smith

=== 2013 ===
- Florence Griffith Joyner
- Tony Gwynn
- Greg Louganis
- Joe Montana
- John Robinson
- Luc Robitaille

=== 2014 ===
- 1972 USC Trojans football team
- Bo Jackson
- Lisa Leslie
- John McKay
- Jackie Slater
- James Worthy

=== 2015 ===
- Lisa Fernandez
- Michael Garrett
- Danny Lopez
- Warren Moon
- Jamaal Wilkes

=== 2016 ===
- Lindsay Davenport
- Jim Fox
- Dr. Frank Jobe
- Ralph Lawler
- Ronnie Lott
- Christian Okoye
- Fernando Valenzuela

=== 2017 ===
- John Force
- Michelle Kwan
- James Lofton
- Byron Scott
- Leigh Steinberg

=== 2018 ===
- Cliff Branch
- Tim Brown
- Michael Cooper
- Tony La Russa
- Stan Morrison

=== 2019 ===
- Barry Bonds
- Dr. Jerry Buss
- Todd Christensen
- Jim Gray
- Marques Johnson
- Fred Roggin

=== 2022 ===
- Al Davis
- Roy Firestone
- John Madden
- Bill Plaschke
- Ted Robinson

=== 2023 ===
- Tracy Austin
- Terry Donahue
- Kenny Easley
- Alexi Lalas
- Rick Lozano

=== 2024 ===
- Scott Boras
- Marshall Faulk
- A. C. Green
- Andrew D. Bernstein
- Rodney Peete

=== 2025 ===
- Shane Mosley
- Jesse Sapolu
- Paul Caligiuri
- Janet Evans
- Ron Brown
