= Ray Poage =

American football player (1940–1997)

No. 35, 85, 86
- Positions: Tight end, Wide receiver

Personal information
- Born: November 14, 1940; Plainview, Texas, U.S.
- Died: September 23, 1997 (aged 56); Brazoria County, Texas, U.S.
- Listed height: 6 ft 3 in (1.91 m)
- Listed weight: 215 lb (98 kg)

Career information
- High school: Lamar (Houston, Texas)
- College: Texas
- NFL draft: 1963: 3rd round, 31st overall pick
- AFL draft: 1963: 2nd round, 11th overall pick

Career history
- Minnesota Vikings (1963); Philadelphia Eagles (1964–1966); New Orleans Saints (1967–1970); Atlanta Falcons (1971)

Awards and highlights
- Second-team All-American (1962); Second-team All-SWC (1962)

Career NFL statistics
- Receptions: 145
- Receiving yards: 2,309
- Touchdowns: 13
- Stats at Pro Football Reference

Raymond Coy Poage Jr. (November 14, 1940 – September 23, 1997) was an American football tight end, wide receiver and fullback who played for the Texas Longhorns in college and for eight seasons in the National Football League (NFL) for the New Orleans Saints, Philadelphia Eagles, Minnesota Vikings and Atlanta Falcons.

He played fullback at the University of Texas from 1959 to 1962, the last three years on the varsity. In 1960 he helped the team make it to the 1960 Bluebonnet Bowl where he led the team in rushing with 56 yards on 14 carries and the Longhorns tied #9 Alabama 3–3 to finish the season ranked 17th. The next season he helped the Longhorns achieve a #1 ranking for two weeks, win a share of the Southwest Conference Championship and, though injured, helped them upset Mississippi State in the 1962 Cotton Bowl Classic and finish the season ranked #3/4. That season he was an All Southwest Conference Honorable Mention. In his senior season he helped Texas again get ranked #1 and win the Southwest Conference outright, but the team was upset by LSU in the 1962 Cotton Bowl Classic (in which Poage was used as a decoy and blocker, but never carried the ball) and finished the season ranked #4. Prior to the season he made the cover of the Saturday Evening Post. He was also a second team choice for the All-Conference Team by both the AP and UPI that year, was a 2nd team All-American according to The Sporting News and Time and 3rd Team UPI All-American. In 1963, he played in the Hula Bowl.

Photo of Poage at Texas

He was drafted by the Vikings in the third round of 1963 NFL draft (31st overall) and by the Denver Broncos in the second round of the 1963 American Football League draft (11th overall).

Poage played his first season - which was interrupted with injuries - with the Vikings, before being traded to the Eagles (as part of 6 player deal including Ted Dean, Bob Berry, Don Hultz, Chuck Lamson and Terry Kosens) where he had the best two seasons of his career. In 1964 he had a career high 37 receptions. In 1965 he had the 5th highest yds/reception average in the league with 19.7 and had career highs of 612 yards receiving and 5 touchdowns. He missed all of the 1966 season due to injuries (tendonitis). Nonetheless, he was resigned by the Eagles in the off-season but cut by them after camp. A few weeks later he was signed by the Saints where he saw limited action over the next four season, and spent some time on the injured reserve in 1970. In April 1971, Poage announced his retirement from football but he returned that season to play in four games for the Falcons. He finished his career with 145 receptions for 2309 yards and 13 touchdowns in 86 games and 50 starts.

Poage's brother played college football as well, for Rice, and in 1961 they faced off against each other in a game Texas won.

He died on September 23, 1997, in Brazoria County, TX and was buried in Memorial Oaks Cemetery in Houston, TX.

== NFL career statistics ==
Legend
**Bold**	Career high

Year	Team	Games		Receiving				
Year	Team	GP	GS	Rec	Yds	Avg	Lng	TD
1963	MIN	7	7	15	354	**23.6**	**67**	2
1964	PHI	14	14	**37**	479	12.9	42	1
1965	PHI	13	13	31	**612**	19.7	63	**5**
1967	NOR	12	6	24	380	15.8	65	0
1968	NOR	10	0	1	11	11.0	11	0
1969	NOR	14	6	18	236	13.1	29	4
1970	NOR	12	3	15	166	11.1	36	1
1971	ATL	4	1	4	71	17.8	31	0
		86	50	145	2,309	15.9	67	13
