= Jim Boylan (American football) =

American football player (born 1939)

No. 80
- Position: Wide receiver

Personal information
- Born: March 19, 1939 (age 87); Washington, D.C., U.S.
- Listed height: 6 ft 1 in (1.85 m)
- Listed weight: 185 lb (84 kg)

Career information
- High school: Birmingham (Los Angeles)
- College: Washington State

Career history
- Minnesota Vikings (1963)

Career NFL statistics
- Games played: 3
- Receptions: 6
- Receiving yards: 78
- Receiving touchdowns: 1
- Stats at Pro Football Reference

James Owen Boylan (born March 19, 1939) is an American former professional football player who was a wide receiver in the National Football League (NFL) for the Minnesota Vikings. Born in Washington, D.C., he attended Birmingham High School in Lake Balboa, Los Angeles, California, and played college football for the Washington State Cougars. He joined the Vikings during the 1963 season and played three games, during which he recorded a total of six receptions for 78 yards. His only touchdown came in a 41–10 loss to the Baltimore Colts in Week 13.
