= 1963 Detroit Lions season =

NFL team season

- General manager: Edwin J. Anderson
- Head coach: George Wilson
- Home stadium: Tiger Stadium

Results
- Record: 5–8–1
- Division place: 4th (tied) NFL Western
- Playoffs: Did not qualify

The 1963 Detroit Lions season marked the thirtieth year of the National Football League (NFL) franchise in Detroit and 34th overall.

It was national news in April when NFL Commissioner Pete Rozelle indefinitely suspended two future Hall of Famers, Lions defensive tackle Alex Karras and Packers' halfback Paul Hornung for placing bets on NFL teams. Five other Lions players were fined $2,000 each for betting on games that they did not play in. The Lions franchise was additionally fined $2,000 each on two counts for failure to report information promptly and for lack of sideline supervision. The gambling controversy proved to be an ongoing distraction throughout the season.

Things became lighthearted in August, when gonzo sports journalist George Plimpton endured the Lions' training camp process as an ostensible backup quarterback, going so far as to run a very unsuccessful series of downs in practice, to generate a story for the telling. Plimpton's 1963 training camp experience would culminate in a 1965 best-selling book, Paper Lion.

On Thanksgiving Day in Detroit, the Lions met the Packers for the thirteenth consecutive season. The game ended in a tie, the first for the Packers in five years, and it was the end of the holiday series for Green Bay. Their visit to Tiger Stadium the following year was on a Monday night in late September, and the visiting opponent for Thanksgiving was rotated, starting with the Chicago Bears.

== Offseason ==
=== NFL draft ===
Round	Pick	Player	Position	School
1	12	Daryl Sanders	Offensive Tackle	Ohio State

== Preseason ==
=== Paper Lion ===
Paper Lion, published in 1966, is a non-fiction book by prominent American writer George Plimpton. Plimpton pitched to a lineup of baseball stars in an All-Star exhibition, presumably to answer the question, "How would the average man off of the street fare in an attempt to compete with the stars of professional sports?" He chronicled this experience in his book, Out of My League. In Paper Lion, Plimpton joins the training camp of the 1963 Detroit Lions on the premise of trying out to be the team's third-string quarterback. (The coaches were aware of the deception; the players were not until it became apparent that Plimpton did not really know how to receive the snap from center.) Plimpton, then thirty-six, showed how unlikely it would be for an "average" person to succeed as a professional athlete. When finally inserted at quarterback for a series in a scrimmage conducted in Pontiac, Michigan, Plimpton managed to lose yardage on each play, convincing many in the crowd that he was a professional sports clown inserted for amusement purposes, not someone who was genuinely giving his best effort.

== Regular season ==
=== Schedule ===
Game	Date	Opponent	Result	Record	Venue	Attendance	Recap	Sources
1	September 14	at **Los Angeles Rams**	**W** 23–2	1–0	L.A. Memorial Coliseum	49,342	Recap	
2	September 22	at **Green Bay Packers**	**L** 10–31	1–1	Milwaukee County Stadium	45,912	Recap	
3	September 29	**Chicago Bears**	**L** 21–37	1–2	Tiger Stadium	55,400	Recap	
4	October 6	**San Francisco 49ers**	**W** 26–3	2–2	Tiger Stadium	44,088	Recap	
5	October 13	at Dallas Cowboys	**L** 14–17	2–3	Cotton Bowl	27,264	Recap	
6	October 20	**Baltimore Colts**	**L** 21–25	2–4	Tiger Stadium	51,901	Recap	
7	October 27	**Minnesota Vikings**	**W** 28–10	3–4	Tiger Stadium	44,509	Recap	
8	November 3	at **San Francisco 49ers**	**W** 45–7	4–4	Kezar Stadium	33,511	Recap	
9	November 10	at **Baltimore Colts**	**L** 21–24	4–5	Municipal Stadium	59,758	Recap	
10	November 17	**Los Angeles Rams**	**L** 21–28	4–6	Tiger Stadium	44,951	Recap	
11	November 24	at **Minnesota Vikings**	**L** 31–34	4–7	Metropolitan Stadium	28,763	Recap	
12	November 28	**Green Bay Packers**	**T** 13–13	4–7–1	Tiger Stadium	54,016	Recap	
13	December 8	Cleveland Browns	**W** 38–10	5–7–1	Tiger Stadium	51,382	Recap	
14	December 15	at **Chicago Bears**	**L** 14–24	5–8–1	Wrigley Field	45,317	Recap	
Notes: Intra-conference opponents are in **bold** text. September 14 night game; November 28 Thanksgiving.

== Roster ==
1963 Detroit Lions roster
Quarterbacks: 14 Earl Morrall P; 16 Milt Plum K; Running backs: 46 Larry Ferguson; 45 Dan Lewis; 30 Ollie Matson; 33 Nick Pietrosante; 34 Nick Ryder; 23 Tom Watkins; Wide receivers: 41 Terry Barr; 89 Gail Cogdill; 20 Dick Compton; 82 Al Greer; Tight ends: 80 Jim Gibbons	Offensive linemen: 79 John Gonzaga G/T; 75 John Gordy G; 77 Dan LaRose G; 61 Lucien Reeberg; 70 Daryl Sanders T; 51 Bob Whitlow C; Defensive linemen: 74 Mike Bundra DT; 76 Roger Brown DT; 78 Darris McCord DE; 72 Floyd Peters DT; 83 Jim Simon DE; 88 Sam Williams DE	Linebackers: 59 Ernie Clark OLB; 53 Dennis Gaubatz MLB; 52 Monte Lee OLB; 54 Max Messner OLB; 56 Joe Schmidt MLB; 55 Wayne Walker K/OLB; Defensive backs: 86 Tom Hall FS/CB/WR; 81 Night Train Lane CB; 28 Yale Lary FS/P; 44 Dick LeBeau CB; 21 Bruce Maher CB; 85 Larry Vargo SS/TE	Inactive: 57 Carl Brettschneider LB (IR); 71 Alex Karras DT (Suspended); 43 Gary Lowe S (IR); 25 Pat Studstill WR (IR); 50 Bob Scholtz T (IR); Note: rookies in italics

== Standings ==
NFL Western Conference
	W	L	T	PCT	CONF	PF	PA	STK
Chicago Bears	11	1	2	.917	10–1–1	301	144	W2
Green Bay Packers	11	2	1	.846	9–2–1	369	206	W2
Baltimore Colts	8	6	0	.571	7–5	316	285	W3
Detroit Lions	5	8	1	.385	4–7–1	326	265	L1
Minnesota Vikings	5	8	1	.385	4–7–1	309	390	W1
Los Angeles Rams	5	9	0	.357	5–7	210	350	L2
San Francisco 49ers	2	12	0	.143	1–11	198	391	L5

Note: Tie games were not officially counted in the standings until 1972.
