= 1961 All-Pro Team =

Official list of the best NFL players in 1961

The Associated Press (AP), United Press International (UPI), Pro Football Illustrated (PFI), New York Daily News (NYDN), Newspaper Enterprise Association (NEA), and Sporting News (SN) were among selectors of All-Pros for the 1961 National Football League season.

== Offensive selections ==
=== Quarterbacks ===
- Sonny Jurgensen, Philadelphia Eagles (AP, PFI, UPI)
- Y. A. Tittle, New York Giants (NYDN, UPI-2)
- Bart Starr, Green Bay Packers (NEA-2, NYDN-2)

=== Halfbacks ===
- Paul Hornung, Green Bay Packers (PFI)

=== Fullbacks ===
- Jim Brown, Cleveland Browns (AP, NEA, NYDN, UPI)
- Jim Taylor, Green Bay Packers (NEA, PFI, NYDN-2, UPI-2)

=== Flankers ===
- Lenny Moore, Baltimore Colts (AP, NEA, NYDN, PFI, UPI)
- Tommy McDonald, Philadelphia Eagles (NEA-2, NYDN-2, UPI-2)

=== Ends ===
- Del Shofner, New York Giants (AP, NEA, NYDN, PFI, UPI)
- Red Phillips, Los Angeles Rams (AP, NYDN, UPI, NEA-2)
- Mike Ditka, Chicago Bears (NEA, NYDN-2, UPI-2)
- Buddy Dial, Pittsburgh Steelers (NYDN-2)
- Ron Kramer, Green Bay Packers (PFI)

=== Tackles ===
- Jim Parker, Baltimore Colts (AP, NEA, NYDN, UPI-2)
- Rosey Brown, New York Giants (AP, NEA, NYDN, PFI, UPI)
- Forrest Gregg, Green Bay Packers (PFI, UPI, NYDN-2)
- Mike McCormack, Cleveland Browns (NEA-2, NYDN-2, UPI-2)
- Bob St. Clair, San Francisco 49ers (NEA-2)

=== Guards ===
- Fred Thurston, Green Bay Packers (AP, NEA, NYDN, PFI, UPI)
- Jim Ray Smith, Cleveland Browns (AP, NEA, NYDN, PFI, UPI)
- Bruce Bosley, San Francisco 49ers (NEA-2)
- John Nisby, Pittsburgh Steelers (NEA-2)
- Jack Stroud, New York Giants (NYDN-2, UPI-2)
- Jerry Kramer, Green Bay Packers (NYDN-2)
- Stan Jones, Chicago Bears (UPI-2)

=== Centers ===
- Jim Ringo, Green Bay Packers (AP, NEA, NYDN, PFI, UPI)
- Ray Wietecha, New York Giants (NEA-2, NYDN-2)
- Chuck Bednarik, Philadelphia Eagles (UPI-2)

== Defensive selections ==
=== Defensive ends ===
- Gino Marchetti, Baltimore Colts (AP, NEA, NYDN, PFI, UPI)
- Jim Katcavage, New York Giants (AP, NYDN, PFI, UPI, NEA-2)
- Doug Atkins, Chicago Bears (NEA, NYDN-2)
- Andy Robustelli, New York Giants (NEA-2, NYDN-2, UPI-2)
- Leo Sugar, Philadelphia Eagles (UPI-2)

=== Defensive tackles ===
- Henry Jordan, Green Bay Packers (AP, NEA, NYDN, PFI, UPI)
- Alex Karras, Detroit Lions (AP, PFI, UPI, NYDN-2)
- Roger Brown, Detroit Lions (NEA-2, UPI-2)
- Rosey Grier, New York Giants (NYDN-2)
- Leo Nomellini, San Francisco 49ers (NEA-2)
- Bob Gain, Cleveland Browns (UPI-2)

=== Linebackers ===
- Bill George, Chicago Bears (AP, NEA, PFI, UPI-2)
- Bill Forester, Green Bay Packers (AP, NYDN, PFI, UPI, NEA-2)
- Joe Schmidt, Detroit Lions (AP, NEA, NYDN, UPI)
- Dan Currie, Green Bay Packers (NEA, PFI, UPI)
- Maxie Baughan, Philadelphia Eagles (NYDN, UPI-2)
- Sam Huff, New York Giants (NEA-2, NYDN-2)
- John Reger, Pittsburgh Steelers (NEA-2, NYDN-2)
- Cliff Livingston, New York Giants (NYDN-2, UPI-2)

=== Defensive backs ===
- Jimmy Patton, New York Giants (AP, NEA, NYDN, PFI, UPI)
- Erich Barnes, New York Giants (AP, NYDN, UPI)
- Jesse Whittenton, Green Bay Packers (AP, PFI, UPI, NEA-2, NYDN-2)
- Night Train Lane, Detroit Lions (AP, NEA, PFI, NYDN-2, UPI-2)
- Jimmy Hill, St. Louis Cardinals (NEA)
- Johnny Sample, Pittsburgh Steelers (PFI)
- Don Burroughs, Philadelphia Eagles (NEA-2, NYDN-2, UPI-2)
- Dick Lynch, New York Giants (UPI-2)
- Eddie Dove, San Francisco 49ers (UPI-2)

== Special teams selections ==
=== Kickers ===
- Paul Hornung, Green Bay Packers (AP, NYDN, UPI, NEA-2)

=== Punters ===
- Jerry Norton, St. Louis Cardinals (NEA, NYDN-2)
- Yale Lary, Detroit Lions (NEA-2)

=== Return specialists ===
- Abe Woodson, San Francisco 49ers (NYDN)
- Jon Arnett, Los Angeles Rams (NEA-2, NYDN-2, UPI-2)
- Johnny Sample, Pittsburgh Steelers (NYDN, PFI, UPI, NEA-2)
