= Terry Dillon =

American football player (1941–1964)

Profile
- Position: Defensive back

Personal information
- Born: August 18, 1941; Waukesha, Wisconsin, U.S.
- Died: May 28, 1964 (aged 22); Missoula, Montana, U.S.

Career information
- College: Montana

Career history
- 1963: Minnesota Vikings
- Stats at Pro Football Reference

Terrance Gilbert Dillon (August 18, 1941 – May 28, 1964) was a defensive back in the National Football League (NFL). Dillon played with the Minnesota Vikings during the 1963 NFL season. He had also been drafted in the 19th round of the 1963 American Football League draft by the Oakland Raiders.

On May 28, 1964, Terry Dillon was working on a bridge construction project 25 miles (40 km) west of Missoula when part of the temporary decking gave way and he fell 50 feet (15 m) into the swift-running Clark Fork River. Witnesses said Dillon, a strong swimmer, started swimming for shore, fighting the current, but disappeared after traveling about 200 yards (180 m). His body was found on July 17 by a fisherman about 17 miles (27 km) downstream from the bridge.

In 1965, Minnesota Vikings linebacker Rip Hawkins received the first "Terry Dillon" award given by the Minnesota Vikings in honor of their late teammate. The award symbolizes Dillon's qualities of dedication, self-sacrifice and ability.

== See also ==
- List of gridiron football players who died during their careers
