= 1963 Los Angeles Rams season =

NFL team season

- Owner: Dan Reeves
- Head coach: Harland Svare
- Home stadium: Los Angeles Memorial Coliseum

Results
- Record: 5–9
- Division place: 6th NFL Western
- Playoffs: Did not qualify

Uniform
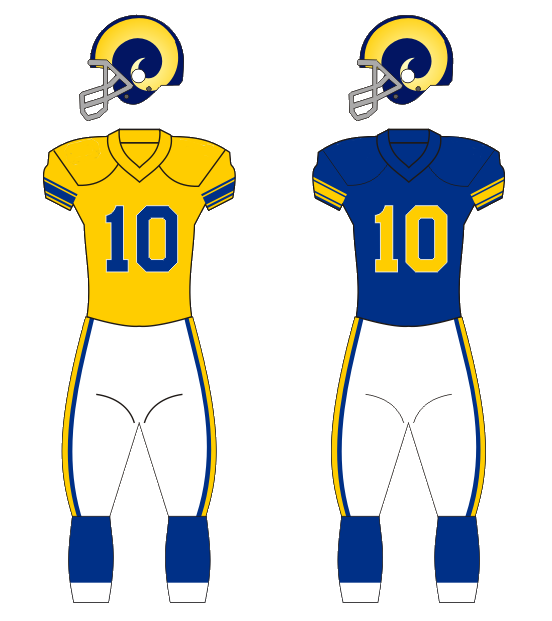

The 1963 Los Angeles Rams season was the team's 26th year with the National Football League and the 18th season in Los Angeles. The Rams were attempting to improve on a disastrous 1–12–1 record in 1962, the worst in franchise history at the time. The Rams lost their first 5 games, including a 52–14 loss at home to the Chicago Bears, the worst home loss in franchise history at the time. The 52 points allowed in that game are the most ever surrendered by the Rams in a home game in franchise history. The Rams then split their next four games to stand at 2–7. Los Angeles then won three consecutive games to stand at 5–7 and keep their slim playoff hopes alive, but two final losses sealed their fate as they finished with a 5–9 record, missing the playoffs for the eighth consecutive season.

== Offseason ==
=== NFL draft ===
Round	Pick	Player	Position	College	Notes
1	1	Terry Baker	Quarterback	Oregon State	
1	10	Rufus Guthrie	Guard	Georgia Tech	From Chicago
2	15	Tom Nomina	Defensive tackle	Miami (OH)	
3	29	Dave Costa	Guard	Utah	
3	37	Johnny Baker	Linebacker	Mississippi State	
4	43	John Griffin	Running back	Memphis State	
5	57	Joe Auer	Running back	Georgia Tech	
5	60	Roland Benson	Tackle	Miami (FL)	
5	67	Don Chuy	Tackle	Clemson	
6	71	George Saimes	Safety	Michigan State	
6	79	Terry Monaghan	Tackle	Penn State	
7	85	Bill Zorn	Tackle	Michigan State	
8	99	Anton Peters	Tackle	Florida	
9	113	Mel Profit	Slotback	UCLA	Played for the Toronto Argonauts and never in the NFL
10	127	Curt Farrier	Tackle	Montana State	
11	141	Dave Theisen	Running back	Nebraska	
12	155	Bill Moody	Back	Arkansas	
13	169	Al Hildebrand	Tackle	Stanford	
14	183	Alan Arbuse	Tackle	Rhode Island	
15	197	Larry Campbell	Tight end	Toledo	
16	211	Walter Burden	Linebacker	McNeese State	
17	225	Jerrel Wilson	Punter	Southern Mississippi	
18	239	Buddy Söfker	Back	LSU	
19	253	Dornel Nelson	Back	Arizona State	
20	267	Bill Redell	Cornerback	Occidental	

= Pro Bowler

== Regular season ==
=== Schedule ===
Week	Date	Opponent	Result	Record	Venue	Attendance
1	September 14	**Detroit Lions**	**L** 2–23	0–1	Los Angeles Memorial Coliseum	49,342
2	September 21	Washington Redskins	**L** 14–37	0–2	Los Angeles Memorial Coliseum	29,295
3	September 29	at Cleveland Browns	**L** 6–20	0–3	Cleveland Municipal Stadium	54,713
4	October 6	at **Green Bay Packers**	**L** 10–42	0–4	City Stadium	42,327
5	October 13	**Chicago Bears**	**L** 14–52	0–5	Los Angeles Memorial Coliseum	40,476
6	October 20	**Minnesota Vikings**	**W** 27–24	1–5	Los Angeles Memorial Coliseum	30,565
7	October 27	**San Francisco 49ers**	**W** 28–21	2–5	Los Angeles Memorial Coliseum	45,532
8	November 3	at **Minnesota Vikings**	**L** 13–21	2–6	Metropolitan Stadium	33,567
9	November 10	at **Chicago Bears**	**L** 0–6	2–7	Wrigley Field	48,312
10	November 17	at **Detroit Lions**	**W** 28–21	3–7	Tiger Stadium	44,951
11	November 24	**Baltimore Colts**	**W** 17–16	4–7	Los Angeles Memorial Coliseum	48,555
12	December 1	at **San Francisco 49ers**	**W** 21–17	5–7	Kezar Stadium	33,321
13	December 7	**Green Bay Packers**	**L** 14–31	5–8	Los Angeles Memorial Coliseum	52,357
14	December 15	at **Baltimore Colts**	**L** 16–19	5–9	Memorial Stadium	52,834
Note: Intra-conference opponents are in **bold** text.

== Roster ==
1963 Los Angeles Rams roster
Quarterbacks (QB): 15 Terry Baker; 18 Roman Gabriel; Running backs (RB): 26 Jon Arnett; 22 Dick Bass; 37 Art Perkins; 36 Ben Wilson; Wide receivers (WR): 27 Pervis Atkins; 81 Carroll Dale; 82 Jim Phillips; Tight ends (TE): 87 John Adams	Offensive linemen (OL): 63 Joe Carollo T; 62 Don Chuy G; 73 Charley Cowan G; 31 Larry Hayes C/OLB; 56 Art Hunter C; 51 Ken Kirk C; 71 Joe Scibelli G; 70 Frank Varrichione T; Defensive linemen (DL): 78 Jim Boeke DT; 79 Stan Fanning DE; 76 Rosey Grier DT; 75 Deacon Jones DE; 85 Lamar Lundy DE; 74 Merlin Olsen DT	Linebackers (LB): 53 Mike Henry OLB/MLB; 89 Cliff Livingston OLB; 86 Marlin McKeever MLB/TE; 32 Jack Pardee OLB; 52 Bill Swain OLB; Defensive backs (DB): 17 Charley Britt FS; 41 Lindon Crow SS; 45 John Griffin CB; 21 Eddie Meador CB; 47 Carver Shannon FS; 23 Bobby Smith CB; 44 Nat Whitmyer FS; Special teams (ST): 11 Danny Villanueva K/P	Practice squad: Andy Von Sonn LB; Reserve: 25 Duane Allen TE (IR); 66 Harley Sewell G (IR); 55 Fred Whittingham G (IR); Rookies in italics

== Standings ==
NFL Western Conference
	W	L	T	PCT	CONF	PF	PA	STK
Chicago Bears	11	1	2	.917	10–1–1	301	144	W2
Green Bay Packers	11	2	1	.846	9–2–1	369	206	W2
Baltimore Colts	8	6	0	.571	7–5	316	285	W3
Detroit Lions	5	8	1	.385	4–7–1	326	265	L1
Minnesota Vikings	5	8	1	.385	4–7–1	309	390	W1
Los Angeles Rams	5	9	0	.357	5–7	210	350	L2
San Francisco 49ers	2	12	0	.143	1–11	198	391	L5

Note: Tie games were not officially counted in the standings until 1972.
