= 1963 San Francisco 49ers season =

American football team season

- Owner: Victor Morabito
- General manager: Louis Spadia
- Head coach: Red Hickey (0–3); Jack Christiansen (2–9)
- Home stadium: Kezar Stadium

Results
- Record: 2–12
- Division place: 7th NFL Western
- Playoffs: Did not qualify

The 1963 San Francisco 49ers season was the franchise's 14th season in the National Football League and their 18th overall.

The 49ers attempted to improve on their 6–8 record from the previous season and make it to the playoffs for the first time in 5 seasons. However, the team lost all of their preseason games and lost their first 3 games of the season under incumbent coach Red Hickey, who resigned after the loss to the Minnesota Vikings in Week 3. Under interim (and later incumbent) head coach Jack Christiansen, the team won only 2 of their last 10 games, and finished with a 2–12 record, missing the playoffs for the 6th straight year.

This was the last season in which the colors were red and silver. The following season, after switching back and forth twice in their history, the team permanently switched to red and gold. It was also the last season the white uniforms did not match the red uniforms; after this season the shoulder stripes on the white uniforms were replaced with the three red stripes on the sleeve, similar to the three white stripes on the red uniforms.

== Offseason ==
=== NFL draft ===
1963 San Francisco 49ers draft
Round	Selection	Player	Position	College	Note
1	8	Kermit Alexander	DB	UCLA	
2	21	Walt Rock	G	Maryland	
3	36	Don Lisbon	DB	Bowling Green	
4	46	Hatch Rosdahl	G	Penn State	from Philadelphia Eagles
4	49	Traded to the Bears			
4	50	Hugh Campbell	DE	Washington State	from Washington Redskins
5	64	Vern Burke	DE	Oregon State	
5	65	Jim Pilot	DB	New Mexico State	from Cleveland Browns
5	66	Gary Moeller	G	Ohio State	from Chicago Bears
6	77	Pat Emerick	G	Western Michigan	
7	92	Ernest DeCourley	T	Moorhead State	
8	105	Roger Locke	E	Arizona State	
9	120	John Maczuzak	T	Pittsburgh	
10	133	Dick Lopour	B	Huron	
11	148	Steve Shafer	B	Utah State	
12	161	Bob Benton	T	Mississippi State	
13	176	Dick Schultz	T	Ohio	
14	189	Bill Tobin	B	Missouri	
15	204	Oliver Ross	B	West Texas State	
16	217	Jim Bogdalek	T	Toledo	
17	232	Ken Reed	G	Tulsa	
18	245	John Sellers	T	Bakersfield J.C.	
19	260	Bob Price	G	North Texas State	
20	273	Don Davis	B	McMurry	

=== Preseason ===
Week	Date	Opponent	Result	Record	Location	Attendance	Sources
1	August 10	Minnesota Vikings	L 28–43	0–1	Portland, Oregon	20,837	
2	August 16	St. Louis Cardinals	L 22–24	0–2	Salt Lake City	19,038	
3	August 25	Cleveland Browns	L 7–24	0–3	Kezar Stadium	28,335	
4	August 29	Dallas Cowboys	L 24–37	0–4	Bakersfield, California	9,927	
5	September 7	at Los Angeles Rams	L 0–17	0–5	Los Angeles Memorial Coliseum	34,405	

== Regular season ==
=== Schedule ===
Game	Date	Opponent	Result	Record	Venue	Attendance	Sources
1	September 15	**Minnesota Vikings**	**L** 20–24	0–1	Kezar Stadium	30,781	Recap
2	September 22	**Baltimore Colts**	**L** 14–20	0–2	Kezar Stadium	31,006	Recap
3	September 29	at **Minnesota Vikings**	**L** 14–45	0–3	Metropolitan Stadium	28,567	Recap
4	October 6	at **Detroit Lions**	**L** 3–26	0–4	Tiger Stadium	44,088	Recap
5	October 13	at **Baltimore Colts**	**L** 3–20	0–5	Memorial Stadium	56,962	Recap
6	October 20	**Chicago Bears**	**W** 20–14	1–5	Kezar Stadium	35,837	Recap
7	October 27	at **Los Angeles Rams**	**L** 21–28	1–6	L.A. Memorial Coliseum	45,532	Recap
8	November 3	**Detroit Lions**	**L** 7–45	1–7	Kezar Stadium	33,511	Recap
9	November 10	Dallas Cowboys	**W** 31–24	2–7	Kezar Stadium	29,563	Recap
10	November 17	at New York Giants	**L** 14–48	2–8	Yankee Stadium	62,982	Recap
11	November 24	at **Green Bay Packers**	**L** 10–28	2–9	County Stadium	45,905	Recap
12	December 1	**Los Angeles Rams**	**L** 17–21	2–10	Kezar Stadium	33,321	Recap
13	December 8	at **Chicago Bears**	**L** 7–27	2–11	Wrigley Field	46,994	Recap
14	December 14	**Green Bay Packers**	**L** 17–21	2–12	Kezar Stadium	31,031	Recap
Note: Intra-conference opponents are in **bold** text.

=== Notes ===
- In the September 29 game at Minnesota, John Brodie suffered a season-ending injury.
- The following week at Detroit, Bob Waters made his first career start at quarterback.
- On October 20 against Chicago, Lamar McHan took over as starting quarterback for the Niners, and led them to their first victory since December 2, 1962.

== Standings ==
NFL Western Conference
	W	L	T	PCT	CONF	PF	PA	STK
Chicago Bears	11	1	2	.917	10–1–1	301	144	W2
Green Bay Packers	11	2	1	.846	9–2–1	369	206	W2
Baltimore Colts	8	6	0	.571	7–5	316	285	W3
Detroit Lions	5	8	1	.385	4–7–1	326	265	L1
Minnesota Vikings	5	8	1	.385	4–7–1	309	390	W1
Los Angeles Rams	5	9	0	.357	5–7	210	350	L2
San Francisco 49ers	2	12	0	.143	1–11	198	391	L5

Note: Tie games were not officially counted in the standings until 1972.

== Personnel ==
=== Staff and Coaches ===
1963 San Francisco 49ers staff
Front office: Team Owner - Victor Morabito; General manager – Louis Spadia; Head coaches: Head coach - Red Hickey (0-3, resigned) Jack Christiansen (interim, 2-9); Offensive coaches: Chief of Offense / Offensive Coordinator - Bill Johnson; Offensive Ends – Billy Wilson	Defensive coaches: Defensive Assistant – Dick Voris; Defensive Backfield / Secondary – Jim David; Special teams coaches: None - N/A

=== Roster ===
1963 San Francisco 49ers roster
Quarterbacks (QB): 15 Lamar McHan; 11 Bob Waters; Running backs (RB): 38 Mike Lind; 42 Don Lisbon; 36 Joe Perry; 24 J. D. Smith; 33 Jim Vollenweider; Wide receivers (WR): 30 Bernie Casey; 88 Clyde Conner; 26 Kay McFarland; Tight ends (TE): 84 Gary Knafelc; 85 Monty Stickles	Offensive linemen (OL): 77 Bruce Bosley C/G; 75 Clyde Brock T; 72 Leon Donohue G; 62 Mike Magac G; 76 Len Rohde T; 52 Karl Rubke C; 79 Bob St. Clair T; 78 John Thomas G; Defensive linemen (DL): 86 Dan Colchico DE; 60 Roland Lakes DT; 74 Clark Miller DE; 73 Leo Nomellini DT; 65 Chuck Sieminski DT; 66 Roy Williams DT	Linebackers (LB): 53 Mike Dowdle MLB; 55 Matt Hazeltine OLB; 54 Ed Pine OLB; 35 Bill Cooper MLB/OLB; Defensive backs (DB): 39 Kermit Alexander CB; 37 Jimmy Johnson FS; 45 Elbert Kimbrough SS; 29 Dale Messer SS; 28 Howie Williams CB/S; 40 Abe Woodson CB; Special teams (ST): 36 Tommy Davis K/P	Reserve: 12 John Brodie QB (IR); 82 Floyd Dean LB (IR); 17 Billy Kilmer (IR) RB/QB; 70 Charlie Krueger DT (IR); 80 Jerry Mertens CB (IR); 67 Walt Rock DE (IR); Rookies in italics

=== Awards, records, and honors ===
Tommy Davis: Pro Bowl selection
Abe Woodson: Pro Bowl selection
