= Bill Forester =

American football player (1932–2007)

No. 69, 71
- Positions: Guard, linebacker, defensive tackle

Personal information
- Born: August 9, 1932; Dallas, Texas, U.S.
- Died: April 27, 2007 (aged 74); Dallas, Texas, U.S.
- Listed height: 6 ft 3 in (1.91 m)
- Listed weight: 237 lb (108 kg)

Career information
- High school: Woodrow Wilson (Dallas)
- College: SMU (1949–1952)
- NFL draft: 1953: 3rd round, 31st overall pick

Career history
- Green Bay Packers (1953–1963)

Awards and highlights
- 2× NFL champion (1961, 1962); 3× First-team All-Pro (1960, 1961, 1962); 2× Second-team All-Pro (1959, 1963); 4× Pro Bowl (1959-1962); Green Bay Packers Hall of Fame; First-team All-SWC (1952); Texas High School Football Hall of Fame

Career NFL statistics
- Interceptions: 21
- Fumble recoveries: 15
- Sacks: 16.5
- Stats at Pro Football Reference

George William Forester (August 9, 1932 – April 27, 2007) was an American professional football player who was a linebacker in the National Football League (NFL). He played 11 seasons for the Green Bay Packers from 1953 to 1963 and was selected to four Pro Bowls. He was selected to the Packers Hall of Fame in 1974. He played college football for the SMU Mustangs.

== Early life ==
Born and raised in Dallas, Texas, Forester graduated from its Woodrow Wilson High School in 1949 at age 16. He was an all-city, all-state, and all-Southern fullback / linebacker for the Wildcats and played in the 1949 Texas High School Coaches Association All-Star Game.

Forester played college football in Dallas at Southern Methodist University and was named All-Southwest Conference (SWC) linebacker in 1951 and 1952. He also played on the defensive line and at fullback. Following his senior season with the Mustangs in 1952, he was selected to play in the East–West Shrine Game in December and the College All-Star Game in Chicago in August 1953.

== Playing career ==
Forester was selected in the third round (31st overall) of the 1953 NFL draft by the Green Bay Packers. He played on the Packer defense for 11 seasons, from 1953 through 1963, as a defensive tackle for three of his first four seasons, with one season at left outside linebacker. He then moved to middle linebacker for a few games in 1957, and later to the right side where he would play the rest of his career at. Forester played under four head coaches in Green Bay; the last was Vince Lombardi, who arrived in his seventh season in 1959. He was a member of Lombardi's first two NFL championship teams in 1961 and 1962, both wins over the New York Giants.

Forester made All-Pro five times (1959–1963) and played in four Pro Bowls (1959–1962). He was a defensive captain for seven seasons and was inducted into the Green Bay Packers Hall of Fame in early 1974. Forester was inducted into his high school's hall of fame in 1999 and into the Texas High School Football Hall of Fame in 2002. In 2015, the Professional Football Researchers Association named Forester to the PFRA Hall of Very Good Class of 2015.

== After football ==
Forester moved back to Dallas and ran a successful sporting goods business for decades before his retirement.

== Death ==
After a long illness, Forester died at age 74 in 2007. He is buried at Sparkman-Hillcrest Memorial Park Cemetery in North Dallas.
