= John Griffin (defensive back) =

American gridiron football player (born 1939)

No. 45, 46, 25
- Position: Defensive back

Personal information
- Born: November 2, 1939 (age 87); Nashville, Tennessee, U.S.
- Listed height: 6 ft 1 in (1.85 m)
- Listed weight: 190 lb (86 kg)

Career information
- High school: East Nashville
- College: Memphis
- NFL draft: 1963: 4th round, 43rd overall pick
- AFL draft: 1963: 8th round, 61st overall pick

Career history
- Los Angeles Rams (1963); Denver Broncos (1964-1966); BC Lions (1967–1968)

Career NFL/AFL statistics
- Interceptions: 4
- Touchdowns: 2
- Stats at Pro Football Reference

John Watson Griffin (born November 2, 1939) is an American former professional football player who was a defensive back in the National Football League (NFL) and Canadian Football League (CFL). He played college football for the Memphis Tigers (1959–1962). He played professionally for the NFL's Los Angeles Rams (1963) and Denver Broncos (1964–1966) and CFL's BC Lions (1967–1968).

== Early life ==
A native of Nashville, Tennessee, he attended East Nashville High School in that city. He then played college football as a defensive back and running back at Memphis from 1959 to 1962. He helped lead the 1962 Memphis State Tigers football team to an 8–1 record. At the end of the 1962 season, he was selected to play in the Senior Bowl and the Chicago College All-Star Game.

== Professional career ==
He was selected in the fourth round by the Los Angeles Rams with the 43rd overall pick in the 1963 NFL draft. He played for the Rams during the 1963 season, appearing in 10 NFL games.

He later played in the American Football League (AFL) for the Denver Broncos from 1964 to 1966, appearing in 26 AFL games.

He finished his playing career in the Canadian Football League, playing for the BC Lions during the 1967 and 1968 seasons. He appeared in a total of 26 CFL games.

== Later life ==
After his playing career ended, Griffin worked in sales from 1969 until his retirement in 2000. He also served as a scout for the Dallas Cowboys, Tampa Bay Buccaneers, and Montreal Alouettes. He was inducted into the University of Memphis Club Hall of Fame in 2004.
