= Ed Sharockman =

American football player (1939–2017)

No. 45
- Position: Cornerback

Personal information
- Born: November 4, 1939; St. Clair, Pennsylvania, U.S.
- Died: August 19, 2017 (aged 77); Woodbury, Minnesota, U.S.
- Listed height: 6 ft 0 in (1.83 m)
- Listed weight: 200 lb (91 kg)

Career information
- High school: St. Clair
- College: Pittsburgh
- NFL draft: 1961: 5th round, 57th overall pick
- AFL draft: 1961: 22nd round, 174th overall pick

Career history
- Minnesota Vikings (1961–1972)

Awards and highlights
- NFL champion (1969); 50 Greatest Vikings; Minnesota Vikings 25th Anniversary Team

Career NFL statistics
- Interceptions: 40
- Interception yards: 804
- Fumble recoveries: 9
- Sacks: 2
- Total touchdowns: 4
- Stats at Pro Football Reference

Edward Charles Sharockman (November 4, 1939 – August 19, 2017) was an American professional football cornerback. He played college football at Pittsburgh.

== Early life ==
Sharockman was born on November 4, 1939, in St. Clair, Pennsylvania. He attended St. Clair High School. During his senior year, Sharockman led St. Clair's football team to an undefeated season and its basketball and baseball teams to championships.

Sharockman played on St. Clair's football team with his brother Jack. He played quarterback on offense and played on defense as well. He was also a kick returner and punter. In the team's 1955 opening game, Sharockman threw a touchdown pass, had a defensive fumble recovery and an interception. As a senior in 1956, he was nominated for the Associated Press's (AP) All-Pennsylvania scholastic football team at quarterback. Sharockman was both a fine passer and runner, and the 1956 St. Clair football team went undefeated for the first time in school history.

As a senior, he passed for 12 touchdowns and rushed for four touchdowns, setting a St. Clair scoring record. He was selected to Pennsylvania's Big 33 Team, was named All-State by the AP and United Press International (UPI) and was selected the Most Valuable Player in Pennsylvania's high school East-West All Star Game.

Sharockman also played on St. Clair's basketball team. In his junior (1955-56) and senior (1956-57) years, he was named to the North Schuylkill All-League Team, and was the only player unanimously selected to that team for the 1956-57 season. He led St. Clair to the North Schuylkill League championship as a senior. The 6 ft 1 in (1.85 m) Sharockman was known as both a good scorer and ball handler, and was considered one of eastern Pennsylvania's finest high school basketball players.

Sharockman also played first base on St. Clair's baseball team. He scored the game-winning run when St. Clair won the Pennsylvania Interscholastic Athletic Association District Eleven championship in 1957.

In 1965, St. Clair honored Sharockman with a testimonial dinner, where Minnesota Vikings head coach Norm Van Brocklin was the main speaker. During the ceremony, the retirement of his high school No. 42 jersey was announced.

== College ==
Sharockman attended the University of Pittsburgh (Pitt), where he played quarterback on the football team in 1958 and 1960. In 1958, Sharockman rushed for 150 yards in 23 attempts, with a 50-yard touchdown run against Penn State. In March 1959, he voluntarily left Pitt during the Spring 1959 semester and was readmitted in December 1959. One other sophomore player voluntarily left and two more were expelled at the time, including future NFL star Mike Lucci who later transferred to Tennessee.

In 1960, functioning as a rollout option quarterback, Sharockman rushed for 257 yards, averaging 4.8 yards per carry; and passed for 234 yards. Sharockman was also a highly rated defensive back and punt returner. Professional football scouts were more interested in Sharockman as a defensive back than as an offensive player.

He was hand-picked by Otto Graham to play in the 1961 Chicago College All-Star Game against the Philadelphia Eagles. Sharockman slipped and broke his ankle during the game, while defending future Hall of Fame receiver Tommy McDonald, and missed the entire 1961 NFL season.

== Professional career ==
He was drafted in the fifth round by the Minnesota Vikings in the National Football League's 1961 draft (57th overall), and in the 22nd round by the Dallas Texans of the American Football League (174th overall). He chose to play with the Vikings, where he spent his entire 12 season career (1961–1972), from 1961 to 1966 under head coach Norm Van Brocklin (who reached the Hall of Fame as a quarterback) and then from 1967 to 1972 under Hall of Fame coach Bud Grant. He started in Super Bowl IV.

1961 was the Vikings inaugural NFL season. After suffering a double ankle fracture in the August 1961 College All-Star Game, Sharockman missed either the entire season or virtually the entire 1961 season. He is reported as active for one game in some sources and missing the entire season in contemporaneous sources. Even though injured, Sharockman fully participated in every team meeting and studied the game film of every game in 1961, particularly focusing on cornerback play. He also attended every Vikings' game.

1962 is considered Sharockman's rookie season, and he was named to the NFL's All-Rookie team that year. He was assigned to play right cornerback for the Vikings. He started all 14 games at right cornerback, with a team-leading six interceptions and two fumble recoveries on the season. He was tied for ninth in most interceptions in the NFL. Sharockman also returned one punt and three kickoffs for the Vikings in 1962, but his role as a return man was limited when he suffered dislocated fingers during the season. His biggest play of the season came in a December 1962 game against the Detroit Lions when he recovered a Milt Plum fumble and ran 88 yards for a touchdown. It was the longest return of a fumble in the NFL that year.

In 1963, Sharockman again started all 14 games at right cornerback for the Vikings. He led the Vikings with five interceptions. In an October 13 game against the Green Bay Packers, he intercepted a pass thrown by future Hall of Fame quarterback Bart Starr, and returned it 47 yards for a touchdown. He also returned seven kickoffs for 139 yards in 1963.

In 1964, the Vikings had their first winning season (8–5–1). Sharockman again started all 14 games at right cornerback, with one interception and one fumble recovery. The Sporting News named him first-team All-Conference. In 1965, Sharockman played at strong safety as well as right cornerback. He had six interceptions on the season, returning one for a 40-yard touchdown against the Detroit Lions. He was tied for third in the NFL for most interceptions.

After starting every Vikings' game from 1962 through 1965, Sharockman started only nine games in 1966. He dealt with a rib injury during the season. After not serving as a return man in 1965, he returned nine punts in 1966, including a 76-yard punt return against the Los Angeles Rams. He was caught at the two yard line before being able to score.

Bud Grant replaced Van Brocklin as head coach going into the 1967 season. Sharockman remained at right cornerback, starting 13 games during the season, with three interceptions. The Vikings were 3–8–3 that year. It was their last losing season for the next 11 years. In 1968, the Vikings won the NFL's Central Division with an 8–6 record before losing to the Baltimore Colts in the Divisional Round of the 1968 playoffs, 24–14. Sharockman started all 14 games and had four interceptions. Sharockman started the playoff game and intercepted an Earl Morrall pass, returning it for 21 yards.

In 1969, the Vikings had a 12–2 record, won the NFL Championship Game over the Cleveland Browns, and reached Super Bowl IV, losing to the Kansas City Chiefs, 23–7. Sharockman, however, started just four games during the regular season. He had a knee and/or ankle injury even before the season started and missed the first two games before even being activated. Grant replaced Sharockman at right cornerback with Bobby Bryant, who was leading the NFL in interceptions when he too suffered a knee injury and was replaced by Sharockman.

Sharockman started in the divisional round playoff victory over the Rams, 23–20; the NFL Championship win over the Browns, 27–7; and the Super Bowl IV loss to the Chiefs, in which he made four tackles. He was one of the key defenders who limited future Hall of Fame wide receiver Paul Warfield in the game against the Browns. He was called for pass interference against Frank Pitts during the Super Bowl.

Sharockman returned to full time starter at right cornerback in 1970 and 1971. He had a career best seven interceptions in 1970, and then six interceptions in 1971. He was tied for fifth best in the NFL in interceptions in 1970, and tied for ninth best in 1971. When Bryant started during those years, it was at left cornerback. The 1970 Vikings were 12–2 and won the NFC Central Division, but lost to the San Francisco 49ers, 17–13 in the divisional round of the 1970-71 playoffs. The Vikings were 11–3 in 1971, again winning the Central Division; but lost in the divisional round to the Dallas Cowboys, 20–12.

On October 18, 1970, Sharockman enjoyed possibly his single best game as a professional, in a Vikings' 54–13 victory over the eventual 1970 National Football Conference champion Dallas Cowboys. In the first quarter, Viking linebacker Mike McGill deflected a Ron Widby punt and Sharockman recovered the ball and ran 23 yards for a touchdown. In the second quarter, Sharockman intercepted a Craig Morton pass, returning it 34 yards for another touchdown. When Morton was injured in the second quarter, future Hall of Fame quarterback Roger Staubach entered the game. Sharockman intercepted a Staubach pass and returned it 43 yards, setting up another score for the Vikings.

Before the 1972 season started, Sharockman was described as one of the Vikings' best athletes, and it was anticipated he would again be a starter. However, Sharockman lost his starting job to Charlie West. The Vikings waived Sharockman at the end of October 1972, after he played in seven games, but started only one. He was claimed immediately by the Philadelphia Eagles, but never played a game for them. Sharockman did not want to leave his home of 12 years in the Twin Cities area, in Edina, Minnesota, and uproot his young children. He also had a job as a stockbroker there.

== Legacy and honors ==
In 2010, Sharockman was selected one of the 50 greatest Vikings. He was nicknamed "Bozo" by his Vikings teammates because of his clowning nature with them. Defensive end Jim Marshall, who played in 270 consecutive games for the Vikings from their inception in 1961 through 1979 said of Sharockman, "'He was absolutely a great teammate. He was a guy you could depend on. I have thousands of great memories of Ed.'"

In his 12 seasons with the Vikings, he intercepted 40 passes, returned for 804 yards with three touchdowns and recovered nine fumbles, returned for 113 yards with one touchdown. He has the third most interceptions in Vikings' history. He had a reputation as a strong and sure tackler.

He was named St. Clair, Pennsylvania's Athlete of the Century.

== Personal life ==
After retiring from football, Sharockman was a realtor for 30 years in the Minneapolis-St. Paul, Minnesota region. In 1980, he experienced a religious conversion as a Christian.

== Death ==
Sharockman died on August 19, 2017, in Woodbury, Minnesota. He was survived by his wife of 52 years, Fran, and two sons.
