= Dave O'Brien (American football) =

American football player (born 1941)

No. 74, 68, 52
- Positions: Tackle, Guard, Defensive tackle

Personal information
- Born: June 13, 1941 (age 85); Cambridge, Massachusetts, U.S.
- Listed height: 6 ft 3 in (1.91 m)
- Listed weight: 247 lb (112 kg)

Career information
- High school: Watertown (MA)
- College: Boston College
- NFL draft: 1963: 13th round, 171st overall pick
- AFL draft: 1963: 18th round, 142nd overall pick

Career history
- Minnesota Vikings (1963–1964); New York Giants (1965); St. Louis Cardinals (1966–1967)

Career NFL statistics
- Games played: 60
- Games started: 3
- Fumble recoveries: 2
- Stats at Pro Football Reference

David Hyde O'Brien (born June 13, 1941) is an American former professional football player who was a Tackle, defensive tackle, guard in the National Football League (NFL). O'Brien played college football for the Boston College Eagles in 1961 and 1962. He also played professionally for the Minnesota Vikings (1963–1964), New York Giants (1965), and St. Louis Cardinals (1966–1967).

== Early life ==
A native of Cambridge, Massachusetts, O'Brien was the son of a research chemist who studied at Massachusetts Institute of Technology.

O'Brien attended Watertown High School and then enrolled at Boston College. He received a degree in mathematics from Boston College. He also played college football as a tackle for Boston College Eagles football team from 1959 to 1962. He won All-New England onors while playing for the 1962 Boston College Eagles football team that compiled an 8–2 record.

== Professional football ==
He was selected by the Minnesota Vikings in the 13th round (171st overall pick) of the 1963 NFL draft. He played for the Minnesota Vikings during the 1963 and 1964 seasons, appearing in 28 games as an offensive guard and offensive tackle.

In May 1965, the Vikings traded O'Brien to the New York Giants for defensive end Bob Taylor. He appeared in 10 games as an offensive guard for the Giants in 1965.

In 1966, he was acquired off waivers by the St. Louis Cardinals. He appeared in 22 games for the Cardinals during the 1966 and 1967 seasons. O'Brien's playing career ended on November 5, 1967, when he broke two bones in his right leg while blocking on the opening kickoff in a game against the Washington Redskins. He was placed on injured waivers by the Cardinals in July 1968. O'Brien appeared in a total of 60 NFL games during his career.
