= 1963 Baltimore Colts season =

11th season in franchise history

- Owner: Carroll Rosenbloom
- General manager: Don "Red" Kellett
- Head coach: Don Shula
- Home stadium: Memorial Stadium

Results
- Record: 8–6
- Division place: 3rd NFL Western
- Playoffs: Did not qualify

Program for the October 13 game against the visiting San Francisco 49ers.

The 1963 Baltimore Colts season was the team's 11th season in the National Football League. The Baltimore Colts finished the 1963 National Football League's season with a record of 8 wins and 6 losses, in third place in the Western Conference.

It was the first season as a head coach for Don Shula, age 33. Hired in early January, he had spent the previous three years as an assistant with the Detroit Lions under head coach George Wilson, coaching the defensive backfield. Shula played in the NFL for seven seasons (1951–57), four of those with the Colts (1953–56).

== Roster ==
1963 Baltimore Colts roster
Quarterbacks (QB): 15 Gary Cuozzo; 19 Johnny Unitas; Running backs (RB): 45 Jerry Hill; 41 Tom Matte; 35 J. W. Lockett; Wide receivers (WR): 82 Raymond Berry; 25 Alex Hawkins; 28 Jimmy Orr; 27 R. C. Owens; 87 Willie Richardson; Tight ends (TE): 31 Dick Bielski; 88 John Mackey; 86 Butch Wilson	Offensive linemen (OL): 73 Tom Gilburg T/P; 77 Jim Parker G; 60 George Preas T; 68 Alex Sandusky G; 71 Dan Sullivan G; 52 Dick Szymanski C; 72 Bob Vogel T; Defensive linemen (DL): 81 Ordell Braase DE; 75 Jim Colvin DT; 78 John Diehl DT; 89 Gino Marchetti DE; 76 Fred Miller DT; 83 Don Thompson DE	Linebackers (LB): 55 Jackie Burkett OLB; 36 Bill Pellington MLB; 50 Bill Saul OLB; 66 Don Shinnick OLB; Defensive backs (DB): 40 Bobby Boyd CB; 26 Wendell Harris CB; 20 Jerry Logan SS; 43 Lenny Lyles CB; 80 Andy Nelson SS; 46 Jim Welch FS; Special teams (ST): 47 Jim Martin K	Reserve: 53 Butch Maples LB (IR); 24 Lenny Moore WR (IR); 62 Palmer Pyle G (IR); -- Billy Ventura DE (IR); Rookies in italics

== Regular season ==
=== Schedule ===
Week	Date	Opponent	Result	Record	Venue	Attendance
1	September 15	New York Giants	**L** 28–37	0–1	Memorial Stadium	60,029
2	September 22	at **San Francisco 49ers**	**W** 20–14	1–1	Kezar Stadium	31,006
3	September 29	at **Green Bay Packers**	**L** 20–31	1–2	New City Stadium	42,327
4	October 6	at **Chicago Bears**	**L** 3–10	1–3	Wrigley Field	48,998
5	October 13	**San Francisco 49ers**	**W** 20–3	2–3	Memorial Stadium	56,962
6	October 20	at **Detroit Lions**	**W** 25–21	3–3	Tiger Stadium	51,901
7	October 27	**Green Bay Packers**	**L** 20–34	3–4	Memorial Stadium	60,065
8	November 3	**Chicago Bears**	**L** 7–17	3–5	Memorial Stadium	60,065
9	November 10	**Detroit Lions**	**W** 24–21	4–5	Memorial Stadium	59,758
10	November 17	at **Minnesota Vikings**	**W** 37–34	5–5	Metropolitan Stadium	33,136
11	November 24	at **Los Angeles Rams**	**L** 16–17	5–6	Los Angeles Memorial Coliseum	48,555
12	December 1	at Washington Redskins	**W** 36–20	6–6	RFK Stadium	44,006
13	December 8	**Minnesota Vikings**	**W** 41–10	7–6	Memorial Stadium	54,122
14	December 15	**Los Angeles Rams**	**W** 19–16	8–6	Memorial Stadium	52,834
Note: Intra-conference opponents are in **bold** text.

== Standings ==
NFL Western Conference
	W	L	T	PCT	CONF	PF	PA	STK
Chicago Bears	11	1	2	.917	10–1–1	301	144	W2
Green Bay Packers	11	2	1	.846	9–2–1	369	206	W2
Baltimore Colts	8	6	0	.571	7–5	316	285	W3
Detroit Lions	5	8	1	.385	4–7–1	326	265	L1
Minnesota Vikings	5	8	1	.385	4–7–1	309	390	W1
Los Angeles Rams	5	9	0	.357	5–7	210	350	L2
San Francisco 49ers	2	12	0	.143	1–11	198	391	L5

Note: Tie games were not officially counted in the standings until 1972.

== Season summary ==
=== Week 4 at Bears ===
Week Four: Baltimore Colts (1–2) at Chicago Bears (3–0)

Quarter	1	2	3	4	Total
Colts	0	0	3	0	3
Bears	0	0	0	10	10

at Wrigley Field, Chicago, Illinois

- Date: October 6, 1963
- Game weather: 73 °F (23 °C)
- Game attendance: 48,998
- Box Score

Game information

First quarter

- No scoring

Second quarter

- No scoring

Third quarter

- BAL – Jim Martin 16-yard field goal. Colts 3–0.

Fourth quarter

- CHI – Ronnie Bull 44-yard pass from Rudy Bukich (Bob Jencks kick). Bears 7–3.
- CHI – Roger LeClerc 16-yard field goal. Bears 10–3.

Top passers

- BAL – Johnny Unitas – 21/36, 182 yards, INT
- CHI – Rudy Bukich – 6/7, 112 yards, TD

Top rushers

- BAL – J.W. Lockett – 10 rushes, 13 yards
- CHI – Rick Casares – 7 rushes, 54 yards

Top receivers

- BAL – Tom Matte – 7 receptions, 56 yards
- CHI – Ronnie Bull – 2 receptions, 44 yards, TD

== See also ==
- History of the Indianapolis Colts
- Indianapolis Colts seasons
