= Rip Hawkins =

American football player (1939–2015)

No. 58
- Position: Linebacker

Personal information
- Born: April 21, 1939; Winchester, Tennessee, U.S.
- Died: July 28, 2015 (aged 76); Cheyenne, Wyoming, U.S.
- Listed height: 6 ft 3 in (1.91 m)
- Listed weight: 235 lb (107 kg)

Career information
- High school: Sewanee Military Academy (Sewanee, Tennessee)
- College: North Carolina
- NFL draft: 1961: 2nd round, 15th overall pick
- AFL draft: 1961: 2nd round, 12th overall pick

Career history
- Minnesota Vikings (1961–1965)

Awards and highlights
- Pro Bowl (1963); First-team All-ACC (1959, 1960)

Career NFL statistics
- Interceptions: 12
- Touchdowns: 3
- Fumble recoveries: 4
- Stats at Pro Football Reference

Ross Cooper "Rip" Hawkins (April 21, 1939 – July 28, 2015) was an American professional football player who was a linebacker for five seasons with the Minnesota Vikings of the National Football League (NFL), playing in one Pro Bowl. He played college football for the North Carolina Tar Heels, where he was twice selected a member of the All-Atlantic Coast Conference first team. He left the NFL at the peak of his career to attend law school.

== Early life ==
Hawkins was born on April 21, 1939, in Winchester, Tennessee or Cowan, Tennessee. He lived in Cowan and attended Sewanee Military Academy, where he was outstanding in football, basketball and track. In football, he was an end and fullback on offense and linebacker on defense. He also played center on the school's basketball team, leading them to a 17–5 record in 1956-57. He once held the school record for points in a basketball game (34). He was all-conference in both football and basketball for Sewanee.

== College career ==
Hawkins attended the University of North Carolina on a football scholarship offered by head coach Jim Tatum. He had two basketball scholarship offers at other schools and an opportunity to attend the United States Military Academy at West Point; but he was successfully recruited to North Carolina by Ernie Williamson, who earlier had been at Sewanee College (now the University of the South).

Hawkins played both offense and defense (center and middle linebacker) for the Tar Heels football team, in the Atlantic Coast Conference (ACC). He was a reserve linebacker as a sophomore in 1958, when given an opportunity to play in the third game of that season. He excelled, but suffered a serious knee injury, limiting his play the rest of the season.

As a junior during a mediocre 1959 season for the Tar Heels as a team, Hawkins was one of the team's few bright spots. He was the only Tar Heel selected first-team All-ACC that year. Tar Heels coach Jim Hickey said Hawkins stood out at both linebacker and center, and was the team's most consistent player in 1959.

He continued to excel during his senior year (1960). He was a team co-captain. In November 1960, the Associated Press (AP) named him national Lineman of the Week for his outstanding play in a November 19 upset win over Duke University. The AP also selected Hawkins as the ACC's Lineman of the Week for two consecutive weeks that season. Both the AP and United Press International (UPI) named Hawkins first-team All-ACC at center (middle linebacker) in 1960. Both the AP and the American Football Coaches Association made him an honorable mention All-American in 1960.

In 1961, he received the University's Joseph F. Patterson Medal (established in 1924), presented to a senior on the basis of athletic ability, sportsmanship, morale, and leadership (among other qualities).

He was selected to play in the 1961 Chicago College All-Star Game, but suffered a torn knee ligament in practice and missed the game and some of the Vikings preseason. Hawkins was also selected for three other college all-star games after his senior season, including the East-West Shrine Game.

== Professional career ==
The Minnesota Vikings selected Hawkins with the first pick in the second round of the 1961 NFL draft, 15th overall. 1961 was the expansion Vikings inaugural NFL season. The Boston Patriots of the American Football League (AFL) selected him in the second round of the 1961 AFL draft, 12th overall. Hawkins chose to play for the Vikings, where he was the team's starting middle linebacker from his rookie season in 1961 to 1965. He played under head coach Norm Van Brocklin for his entire career.

Hawkins was the team's defensive co-captain from 1962 to 1965. It has also been stated by Vikings head athletic trainer and historian Fred Zamberletti that because of Hawkins' intelligence, Van Brocklin made the rookie Hawkins one of the team's original co-captains in 1961; along with future Hall of Fame rookie quarterback Fran Tarkenton. The Vikings had selected Tarkenton one round after Hawkins in the 1961 draft, after taking Tommy Mason with the first pick in the first round.

Zamberletti said of Hawkins "He was a strong leader, good character, but he had a mean streak in him . . . He was a middle linebacker and if you came across the middle, you better have your head on a swivel. If you didn't, he would clothesline you. He loved those receivers coming across the middle". As a leader, in only his second season, Hawkins provided considerable help to rookie Roy Winston in learning the linebacker position.

In 1961, he started 13 of the 14 games in which he appeared, at middle linebacker, with five interceptions. He was selected to United Press International's All-Rookie Team. The Vikings upset the Baltimore Colts in a November 1961 game, 28–20, with Hawkins intercepting a pass thrown by future Hall of Fame quarterback Johnny Unitas. He started all 14 games as the Vikings middle linebacker each season for the rest of his NFL career. In 1962, he was a holdout in joining the team until late July. During the season, he had one interception and a safety. In the 1963 season, Hawkins was selected to play in the Pro Bowl. He had one interception, two fumble recoveries and a quarterback sack that season.

In 1964, the Vikings had their first winning season (8–5–1). Hawkins had two interceptions, two fumble recoveries and two sacks. He returned both interceptions for touchdowns. In an October 18 win over the Pittsburgh Steelers, 30–10, he intercepted an Ed Brown pass and returned it 56 yards for a touchdown. In the final game of the season, against the Chicago Bears, he intercepted a Bill Wade pass and returned it 29 yards for a touchdown, in a 41–14 Vikings win. He was selected by the Minneapolis-St. Paul (Twin Cities) chapter of the Professional Football Writers Association of America to receive the Vikings first Terry Dillon Award, after the 1964 season.

In 1965, the Vikings defense now included future Hall of Fame defensive end Carl Eller, Gary Larsen, Jim Marshall, Roy Winston, Ed Sharockman and Karl Kassulke; all of whom would play on the 1969 Vikings NFL championship team. Coach Van Brocklin described Hawkins as the Vikings defensive team leader, and one of the most respected players on the team. Van Brocklin said the Vikings "defense is built around him". In 1965, he had three interceptions and three sacks. He again returned an interception for a touchdown. In what would be the final minutes of the final game of his NFL career, Hawkins intercepted a fourth quarter Rudy Bukich pass with 65 seconds left in the game. He returned it 35 yards for the game-winning touchdown over the Chicago Bears, 24–17.

1965 was his final season in the NFL. At age 27, after five years with the Vikings, Hawkins informed the team in June 1966 that he would have to retire from football to pursue a legal career. He had accumulated 1½ years of credits at Emory Law School in Atlanta, and was informed he would lose the credit for all that work if he did not resume his legal studies. He did not believe transfer to a law school in Minnesota was viable, and was not seeking a trade to the newly formed Atlanta Falcons. After reconsidering in July, he ultimately decided to leave the Vikings and attend law school. He was replaced in 1966 at middle linebacker by Lonnie Warwick.

== Personal life and death ==
During the offseason, he lived with his wife and two children in Monroe, Georgia, where he helped manage a family ranch. He graduated from Emory Law School in 1968, and later worked as an assistant district attorney in Fulton County, Georgia. He also owned a metallurgic business in Minneapolis, and later relocated to Denver where he worked for an oil company. He and his second wife eventually moved to Devil's Tower, Wyoming, where they ran a 700-acre ranch.

Hawkins died in 2015; at the time of his death, he had Lewy body dementia. He was one of at least 345 NFL players to be diagnosed after death with chronic traumatic encephalopathy (CTE), which is caused by repeated hits to the head. He died six months after his fellow original Viking draftee Tommy Mason.
