= 1963 Green Bay Packers season =

NFL team season

- General manager: Vince Lombardi
- Head coach: Vince Lombardi
- Home stadium: City Stadium; Milwaukee County Stadium

Results
- Record: 11–2–1
- Division place: 2nd NFL Western
- Playoffs: Won NFL Playoff Bowl (vs. Browns) 40–23

The 1963 Green Bay Packers season was their 45th season overall and their 43rd season in the National Football League. The two-time defending NFL champions finished with an 11–2–1 record under fifth-year head coach Vince Lombardi for a second-place finish in the Western Conference, a half game back.

Both losses were inflicted by the Chicago Bears (11–1-2), the NFL champions in 1963, as the indefinite suspension of halfback Paul Hornung was too much for Green Bay to overcome. The Packers had won the previous five regular season games with rival Chicago, but scored just ten points total in the two games in 1963, and needed only a tie in one of them to advance to the championship game. (The tie at Detroit on Thanksgiving did not impact the Packers' title chances; ties were omitted from the winning percentage calculation until 1972.) Chicago's only loss was at last place San Francisco in October and they tied Pittsburgh and Minnesota in consecutive weeks after their second defeat of the Packers.

Quarterback Bart Starr suffered a hairline fracture in his passing hand at St. Louis on October 20. Up 23–0 in the third quarter, Starr couldn't find an open receiver on third down and took off on a run that gained 15 yards, tackled with a late hit out of bounds by Cardinal cornerback Jimmy "Iron Claw" Hill, who was ejected. Second-string quarterback John Roach filled in for the rest of the game, a 30–7 win in 85 °F (30 °C) heat, and the next four starts. Zeke Bratkowski was acquired in late October, waived by the Rams, and saw some action, too. Starr returned a month later, in week eleven on November 24 against San Francisco in Milwaukee, a week after the second loss to Chicago.

Following their regular season finale, a 21–17 win at San Francisco on Saturday, Green Bay needed Detroit to defeat the Bears at Wrigley Field on Sunday. The game's progress was updated to the Packers during their flight home; Chicago's 24–14 win ended Green Bay's bid for an unprecedented third consecutive championship game win. They eventually accomplished that feat with titles in 1965, 1966 and 1967.

In the third place Playoff Bowl in Miami three weeks later on January 5, the Packers overwhelmed the Cleveland Browns, 40–23. Green Bay led 28–10 at halftime and extended it to 38–10 in the fourth quarter.

This was the eleventh and final season for Pro Football Hall of Fame center Jim Ringo as a Packer. In May 1964, he and reserve fullback Earl Gros were traded to the Philadelphia Eagles for linebacker Lee Roy Caffey and a first round draft choice. Ringo played four years with the Eagles and then went into coaching; the draft pick was used to select halfback Donny Anderson as a "future" pick in the 1965 NFL draft.

Hall of Fame halfback Hornung did not play this season, suspended in April by commissioner Pete Rozelle for betting on NFL games and associating with undesirable persons.

For the thirteenth consecutive year, the Packers played on Thanksgiving Day, all against the Detroit Lions at Tiger Stadium. Their record in this holiday series was 3–9–1 (.269), and with Lombardi as head coach, they were 2–2–1 (.500), which included the sole loss in 1962 and a tie this season. Green Bay next played on Thanksgiving in 1970 at the Cotton Bowl, which was the franchise's first-ever loss to the Dallas Cowboys.

== Roster ==
1963 Green Bay Packers roster
Quarterbacks (QB): 12 Zeke Bratkowski; 10 John Roach; 15 Bart Starr; Running backs (RB): 40 Earl Gros; 35 Frank Mestnik; 25 Tom Moore; 22 Elijah Pitts; 31 Jim Taylor; Wide receivers (WR): 33 Lew Carpenter; 86 Boyd Dowler; 21 Bob Jeter; 85 Max McGee; Tight ends (TE): 81 Marv Fleming; 88 Ron Kramer	Offensive linemen (OL): 75 Forrest Gregg T; 67 Dan Grimm G; 53 Ken Iman C; 64 Jerry Kramer G/K; 78 Norm Masters T; 51 Jim Ringo C; 76 Bob Skoronski T; 63 Fuzzy Thurston G; Defensive linemen (DL): 82 Lionel Aldridge DE; 87 Willie Davis DE; 79 Dave Hanner DT; 83 Urban Henry DT; 74 Henry Jordan DT; 77 Ron Kostelnik DT	Linebackers (LB): 58 Dan Currie OLB; 71 Bill Forester OLB/MLB; 65 Ed Holler OLB; 89 Dave Robinson OLB; Defensive backs (DB): 26 Herb Adderley CB; 46 Hank Gremminger SS; 23 Jerry Norton P/FS/SS; 47 Jesse Whittenton CB; 24 Willie Wood FS; Special teams (ST)	Practice squad: Doug Hart CB; Gary Kroner K; Reserve: 5 Paul Hornung RB/K (Susp.); 66 Ray Nitschke LB (IR); Rookies in italics

== Schedule ==
Week	Date	Opponent	Result	Record	Venue	Attendance
1	September 15	**Chicago Bears**	**L** 3–10	0–1	City Stadium	42,327
2	September 22	**Detroit Lions**	**W** 31–10	1–1	Milwaukee County Stadium	45,912
3	September 29	**Baltimore Colts**	**W** 31–20	2–1	City Stadium	42,327
4	October 6	**Los Angeles Rams**	**W** 42–10	3–1	City Stadium	42,327
5	October 13	at **Minnesota Vikings**	**W** 37–28	4–1	Metropolitan Stadium	42,567
6	October 20	at St. Louis Cardinals	**W** 30–7	5–1	Busch Stadium	32,224
7	October 27	at **Baltimore Colts**	**W** 34–20	6–1	Memorial Stadium	60,065
8	November 3	Pittsburgh Steelers	**W** 33–14	7–1	Milwaukee County Stadium	46,293
9	November 10	**Minnesota Vikings**	**W** 28–17	8–1	City Stadium	42,327
10	November 17	at **Chicago Bears**	**L** 7–26	8–2	Wrigley Field	49,166
11	November 24	**San Francisco 49ers**	**W** 28–10	9–2	Milwaukee County Stadium	45,905
12	November 28	at **Detroit Lions**	**T** 13–13	9–2–1	Tiger Stadium	54,016
13	December 7	at **Los Angeles Rams**	**W** 31–14	10–2–1	Los Angeles Memorial Coliseum	52,357
14	December 14	at **San Francisco 49ers**	**W** 21–17	11–2–1	Kezar Stadium	31,031
Note: Intra-conference opponents are in **bold** text.

== Game summaries ==
=== Week 1 vs Bears ===
Week One: Chicago Bears (0–0) at Green Bay Packers (0–0)

Quarter	1	2	3	4	Total
Bears	3	0	7	0	10
Packers	3	0	0	0	3

at City Stadium, Green Bay, Wisconsin

- Date: September 15, 1963
- Game weather: 54 °F (12 °C)
- Game attendance: 42,327
- Box Score

Game information

First quarter

- CHI – Bob Jencks 32-yard field goal. Bears 3–0.
- GB – Jerry Kramer 41-yard field goal. Tie 3–3.

Second quarter

- No scoring

Third quarter

- CHI – Joe Marconi 1-yard run (Bob Jencks kick). Bears 10–3.

Fourth quarter

- No scoring

Top passers

- CHI – Bill Wade – 18/24, 129 yards, INT
- GB – Bart Starr – 11/22, 83 yards, 4 INT

Top rushers

- CHI – Rick Casares – 5 rushes, 27 yards
- GB – Jim Taylor – 12 rushes, 53 yards

Top receivers

- CHI – Ronnie Bull – 6 receptions, 48 yards
- GB – Ron Kramer – 3 receptions, 35 yards

=== Week 2 ===
Team	1	2	3	4	Total
Lions	0	0	3	7	10
• Packers	3	7	7	14	31

- Date: September 22
- Location: Milwaukee County Stadium, Milwaukee, Wisconsin
- Game attendance: 45,912
- Game weather: 56 °F (13 °C); wind 14 mph (23 km/h)

Scoring summary
Q1	GB	Kramer 24-yard field goal	GB 3–0
Q2	GB	Taylor 1-yard run (Kramer kick)	GB 10–0
Q3	DET	Walker 36-yard field goal	GB 14–3
Q3	GB	Moore 15-yard run (Kramer kick)	GB 21–3
Q4	DET	Hall 23-yard pass from Plum (Walker kick)	GB 21–10
Q4	GB	Moore 77-yard run (Kramer kick)	GB 28–10
Q4	GB	McGee 39-yard pass from Starr (Kramer kick)	GB 35–10

== Standings ==
NFL Western Conference
	W	L	T	PCT	CONF	PF	PA	STK
Chicago Bears	11	1	2	.917	10–1–1	301	144	W2
Green Bay Packers	11	2	1	.846	9–2–1	369	206	W2
Baltimore Colts	8	6	0	.571	7–5	316	285	W3
Detroit Lions	5	8	1	.385	4–7–1	326	265	L1
Minnesota Vikings	5	8	1	.385	4–7–1	309	390	W1
Los Angeles Rams	5	9	0	.357	5–7	210	350	L2
San Francisco 49ers	2	12	0	.143	1–11	198	391	L5

Note: Tie games were not officially counted in the standings until 1972.

== Playoff Bowl ==
The Playoff Bowl matched the runners-up of the two conferences to determine third place in the league. It was played in January at the Orange Bowl in Miami, Florida, the week following the NFL Championship game.

Game	Date	Opponent	Result	Venue	Attendance
Playoff Bowl	January 5, 1964	Cleveland Browns	W 40–23	Orange Bowl	54,921
