= J. W. Lockett =

American football player (1937–1999)

J.W. Lockett
No. 35, 37, 34
- Position: Fullback

Personal information
- Born: February 23, 1937; Bardwell, Texas, U.S.
- Died: December 14, 1999 (aged 62); Baltimore, Maryland, U.S.
- Listed height: 6 ft 2 in (1.88 m)
- Listed weight: 226 lb (103 kg)

Career information
- High school: Booker T. Washington (Tulsa, Oklahoma)
- College: Central Oklahoma
- NFL draft: 1961: undrafted

Career history
- San Francisco 49ers (1961); Dallas Cowboys (1961–1962); Baltimore Colts (1963); Washington Redskins (1964); Montreal Alouettes (1965–1966)

Awards and highlights
- NFL All-rookie team (1961); 2× All-Oklahoma Collegiate Athletic Conference (1958, 1959); Honorable-mention NAIA All-American (1958); NAIA All-American (1959)

Career NFL statistics
- Rushing yards: 770
- Rushing average: 3.4
- Receptions: 62
- Receiving yards: 589
- Total touchdowns: 10
- Stats at Pro Football Reference

John "J. W." Lockett (February 23, 1937 – December 14, 1999) was an American professional football fullback in the National Football League (NFL) for the San Francisco 49ers, Dallas Cowboys, Baltimore Colts and the Washington Redskins. He also was a member of the Montreal Alouettes in the Canadian Football League (CFL). He played college football at the University of Central Oklahoma.

== Early life ==
Lockett attended Booker T. Washington High School, where he received all-state honors in football, baseball and basketball. After graduating, he played one season of minor league baseball in the Los Angeles Dodgers farm system, before moving on to the University of Central Oklahoma.

He became a four-year starter in football, playing guard and center as a freshman and as a two-way player at tight end and defensive end in his last three years. He also lettered in baseball, basketball and track.

In 2005, he was inducted into the University of Central Oklahoma Athletics Hall of Fame.

Lockett was inducted posthumously into Booker T. Washington's 2022 Ring of Honor class during a ceremony between the Hornets’ basketball games against Bixby on Friday night, Feb 4, 2022 at Nathan E. Harris Fieldhouse.

== Professional career ==
=== San Francisco 49ers ===
Lockett was signed as an undrafted free agent by the San Francisco 49ers after the 1961 NFL draft. He was tried at defensive end, before being moved to fullback, even though he had never played that position. On September 25, after two games, he was traded to the Dallas Cowboys in exchange for a draft choice.

=== Dallas Cowboys ===
In 1961, he started 7 games at fullback and was named to the NFL All-rookie team at the end of the year. On June 29, 1963, he was traded to the Baltimore Colts in exchange for a third round draft choice (#36-Ode Burrell).

=== Baltimore Colts ===
Lockett began the 1963 season as the starter at fullback, until being passed on the depth chart by Jerry Hill. He finished as the team's third leading runner (273 yards).

On February 1, 1964, he was traded to the Washington Redskins in exchange for a fourth round draft choice (#49-Marty Schottenheimer).

=== Washington Redskins ===
In 1964, he was a reserve player. In 1965, he did not report for the start of training camp and was released on August 20.

=== Montreal Alouettes ===
In 1965, he was signed by the Montreal Alouettes of the Canadian Football League and finished the season as the team's leading rusher, playing 12 games, gaining 683 yards on 181 carries, the longest for 29 yards, and 8 touchdowns. In 1966, he only played in 2 games, collecting 103 yards on 22 attempts.
