= Bob Gain =

American football player (1929–2016)

- Gain on a 1956 Browns program

No. 52, 74, 79
- Positions: Defensive tackle, defensive end, guard, tackle

Personal information
- Born: June 21, 1929; Akron, Ohio, U.S.
- Died: November 14, 2016 (aged 87); Willoughby, Ohio, U.S.
- Listed height: 6 ft 3 in (1.91 m)
- Listed weight: 215 lb (98 kg)

Career information
- High school: Weir (Weirton, West Virginia)
- College: Kentucky
- NFL draft: 1951: 1st round, 5th overall pick

Career history
- Ottawa Rough Riders (1951); Cleveland Browns (1952, 1954–1964)

Awards and highlights
- 3× NFL champion (1954, 1955, 1964); 7× Second-team All-Pro (1955–1959, 1961, 1962); 5× Pro Bowl (1957-1959, 1961, 1962); Cleveland Browns Legends; Grey Cup champion (1951); Consensus All-American (1950); Second-team All-American (1949); Outland Trophy (1950); Jacobs Blocking Trophy (1950); 2× First-team All-SEC (1949, 1950); Second-team All-SEC (1948)

Career NFL statistics
- Fumble recoveries: 15
- Interceptions: 1
- Sacks: 14
- Total touchdowns: 1
- Stats at Pro Football Reference
- College Football Hall of Fame

Robert Gain (June 21, 1929 – November 14, 2016) was an American professional football player for 13 seasons with the Cleveland Browns of the National Football League (NFL), and also played in the Canadian Football League (CFL). He played in five Pro Bowls in the space of seven years with the Browns and was a first-team All-Pro selection once and a second-team selection seven times.

Gain played tackle, middle guard, and end and was standout defender at tackle, end, and middle guard. Cleveland led the NFL in many defensive categories in his 12 years and the Browns won 2/3 of their games and three championships during his career.

== College career ==
Gain was a standout offensive and defensive lineman at the University of Kentucky, where he won the Outland Trophy in 1950 as the nation's Outstanding College Interior Football Lineman of the Year. Gain started at tackle four years (1947–1950) at the University of Kentucky (SEC). At Kentucky he won All-American honors his last two years (consensus in 1950) and co-captained a Wildcats team that captured the SEC championship. In 1950, the three-year All-SEC selection was chosen the best SEC lineman by the Atlanta (GA) Touchdown and Birmingham (AL) Quarterback Clubs. He was inducted into the College Football Hall of Fame in 1980.

== Professional career ==
After playing one season in Canada in 1951 with the Ottawa Rough Riders of the Canadian Football League, he returned to Cleveland and played for 12 years (1952, 1954–1964). Gain played defensive tackle for the Cleveland Browns (NFL). A stalwart defensive tackle on six Browns Eastern Conference and three (1954–1955, 1964) NFL championship teams, Gain started in five Pro Bowl games.

Gain interrupted his professional career in 1953 to serve in Korean War for the United States Air Force as a 1st Lieutenant. He returned to the Browns near the end of the 1954 season.

He was honored by the Pittsburgh (PA) Dapper Dan Club and was named to the West Virginia and Cleveland Sports Hall of Fame.

He ended his career with a one-time All-Pro and a 7-time Second-team All-Pro record in his 12 seasons, and after the 1957 season was voted the NFL Defensive linemen of the year by the Los Angeles Times.

He ended his career with three NFL championships with the Browns.

The Professional Football Researchers Association named Gain to the PRFA Hall of Very Good Class of 2010.
