= Tommy Mason =

American football player (1939–2015)

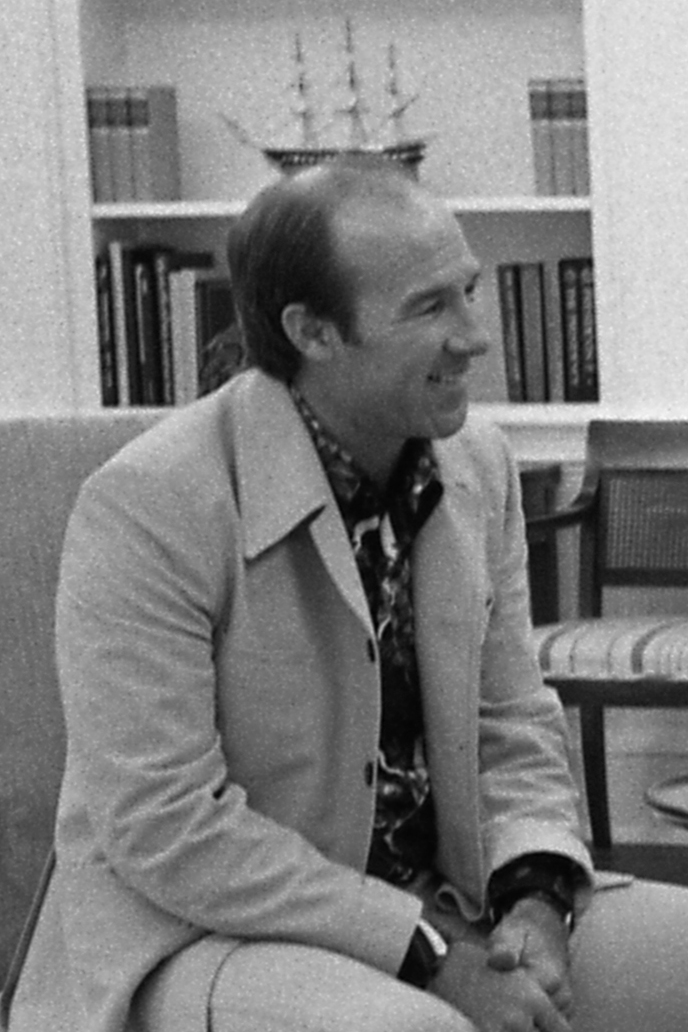
- Mason in the Oval Office in 1975

No. 20
- Position: Running back

Personal information
- Born: July 8, 1939; Lake Charles, Louisiana, U.S.
- Died: January 22, 2015 (aged 75); Newport Beach, California, U.S.
- Listed height: 6 ft 1 in (1.85 m)
- Listed weight: 196 lb (89 kg)

Career information
- High school: Lake Charles
- College: Tulane
- NFL draft: 1961: 1st round, 1st overall pick
- AFL draft: 1961: 1st round, 3rd overall pick

Career history
- Minnesota Vikings (1961–1966); Los Angeles Rams (1967–1970); Washington Redskins (1971)

Awards and highlights
- First-team All-Pro (1963); 3× Pro Bowl (1962–1964); Third-team All-American (1960); First-team All-SEC (1960)

Career NFL statistics
- Rushing yards: 4,203
- Rushing average: 4
- Receptions: 214
- Receiving yards: 2,324
- Total touchdowns: 45
- Stats at Pro Football Reference

Thomas Cyril Mason (July 8, 1939 – January 22, 2015) was an American professional football player who was a running back in the National Football League (NFL). He played college football for the Tulane Green Wave.

== College career ==
Mason attended and played football at Tulane University.

- 1959: 10 Games – 81 carries for 336 yards. 5 catches for 54 yards and 2 TD.
- 1960: 10 Games – 120 carries for 663 yards. 28 catches for 376 yards and 5 TD.

== Professional career ==
Mason was selected first overall by the expansion Minnesota Vikings in the 1961 NFL draft. In six seasons with the Vikings, he rushed for 3,252 yards and scored 28 touchdowns. In the 1967 NFL season, he was signed by the Los Angeles Rams. He played with the Rams for four years but accumulated only four touchdowns and less than 900 yards. He finished his career with the Washington Redskins in 1971. He did not officially announce his retirement until June 8, 1973.

== NFL career statistics ==
Legend
**Bold**	Career high

=== Regular season ===
Year	Team	Games		Rushing					Receiving				
Year	Team	GP	GS	Att	Yds	Avg	Lng	TD	Rec	Yds	Avg	Lng	TD
1961	MIN	13	4	60	226	3.8	21	3	20	122	6.1	18	0
1962	MIN	14	11	167	740	4.4	**71**	2	36	**603**	**16.8**	**74**	**6**
1963	MIN	13	13	166	**763**	**4.6**	70	7	**40**	365	9.1	41	2
1964	MIN	13	12	**169**	691	4.1	51	4	26	239	9.2	29	1
1965	MIN	10	9	141	597	4.2	26	**10**	22	321	14.6	72	1
1966	MIN	7	6	58	235	4.1	52	2	7	39	5.6	17	1
1967	RAM	13	0	63	213	3.4	16	0	13	70	5.4	24	0
1968	RAM	12	7	108	395	3.7	19	3	15	144	9.6	31	0
1969	RAM	13	0	33	135	4.1	17	1	11	185	**16.8**	67	1
1970	RAM	6	2	44	123	2.8	13	0	12	127	10.6	32	1
1971	WAS	10	1	31	85	2.7	11	0	12	109	9.1	18	0
		124	65	1,040	4,203	4.0	71	32	214	2,324	10.9	74	13

=== Playoffs ===
Year	Team	Games		Rushing					Receiving				
Year	Team	GP	GS	Att	Yds	Avg	Lng	TD	Rec	Yds	Avg	Lng	TD
1967	RAM	1	0	**2**	**13**	**6.5**	**10**	0	0	0	0.0	0	0
1969	RAM	1	0	1	2	2.0	2	0	0	0	0.0	0	0
1971	WAS	1	0	0	0	0.0	0	0	**1**	**8**	**8.0**	**8**	0
		3	0	3	15	5.0	10	0	1	8	8.0	8	0

== Records ==
Mason ranks ninth in total rushing yards and ninth in rushing touchdowns for the Minnesota Vikings.

== Personal life ==
Mason was married to Rita Ridinger in the mid-1960s. He married gymnast Cathy Rigby in 1972. They were divorced in 1981. Mason married Louise England in 1987, they divorced in 1994. He married Karen Kay Mason in 1999. He was a 1976 graduate of the Western State College of Law. He died in hospice care at Newport Beach, California on January 22, 2015.
