= Don Lisbon =

American football player (born 1941)

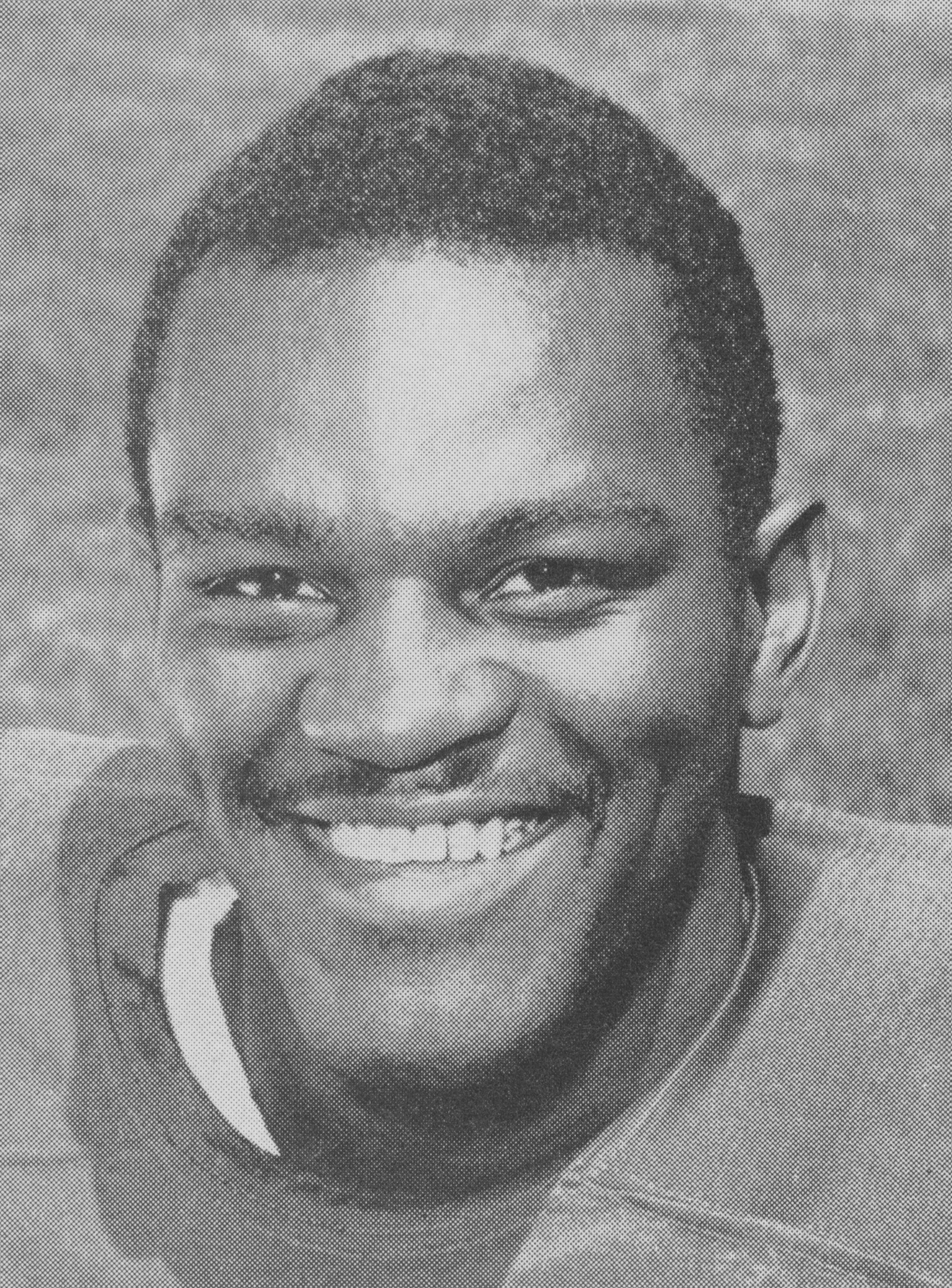
- Lisbon in 1964

No. 42, 24, 21
- Position: Halfback

Personal information
- Born: January 15, 1941 (age 85); Youngstown, Ohio, U.S.
- Listed height: 5 ft 10 in (1.78 m)
- Listed weight: 197 lb (89 kg)

Career information
- High school: South (Youngstown)
- College: Bowling Green (1959-1962)
- NFL draft: 1963: 3rd round, 36th overall pick

Career history
- San Francisco 49ers (1963–1964); St. Louis Cardinals (1965)*; Atlanta Falcons (1966)*; Montreal Alouettes (1966–1967); Edmonton Eskimos (1967-1968)
- * Offseason or practice squad member only

Awards and highlights
- CFL Eastern All-Star (1966)

Career NFL statistics
- Rushing yards: 561
- Rushing average: 3.4
- Receptions: 34
- Receiving yards: 363
- Total touchdowns: 3
- Stats at Pro Football Reference

Don Lisbon (born January 15, 1941) is an American former professional football player who was a running back in the National Football League (NFL), and an all-star in the Canadian Football League (CFL).

After playing college football for the Bowling Green Falcons, Lisbon was selected by the NFL's San Francisco 49ers. He played two seasons with them, including 20 games, 561 rushing yards, 34 pass receptions, three touchdowns, and one completed pass for a touchdown.

He also played three seasons in the CFL. His first, 1966 with the Montreal Alouettes, was a success, rushing for 1007 yards and being named an all-star. He was traded to the Edmonton Eskimos in 1967, and finished his career with them in 1968.
