= Rosey Grier =

American football player and actor (born 1932)

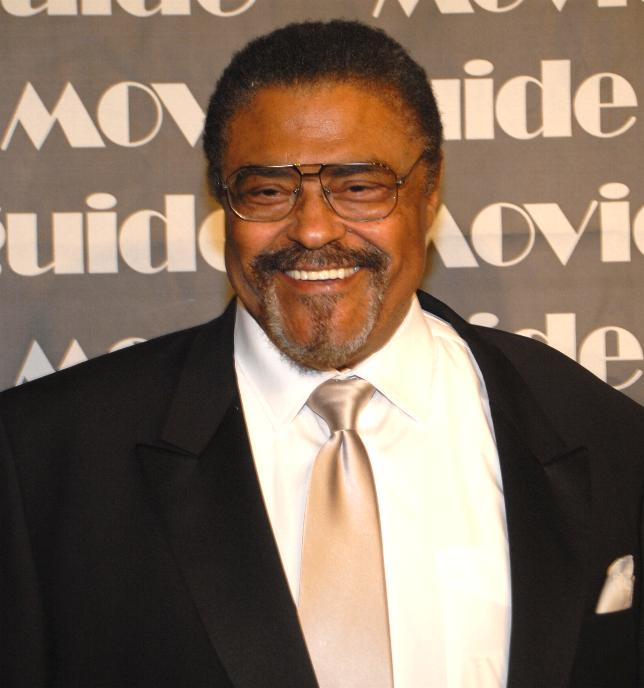
- Grier in 2008 at the Movieguide Faith and Value Awards Gala

No. 76
- Positions: Defensive tackle, defensive end

Personal information
- Born: July 14, 1932 (age 94); Cuthbert, Georgia, U.S.
- Listed height: 6 ft 5 in (1.96 m)
- Listed weight: 284 lb (129 kg)

Career information
- High school: Abraham Clark (Roselle, New Jersey)
- College: Penn State
- NFL draft: 1955: 3rd round, 31st overall pick

Career history
- New York Giants (1955–1962); Los Angeles Rams (1963–1966)

Awards and highlights
- NFL champion (1956); 4× All-Pro (1956, 1958, 1959, 1963); 2× Pro Bowl (1956, 1960); 35th greatest New York Giant of all-time; First-team All-Eastern (1954)

Career NFL statistics
- Fumble recoveries: 13
- Safeties: 2
- Sacks: 36.5
- Stats at Pro Football Reference

Roosevelt "Rosey" Grier (born July 14, 1932) is an American former football player, bodyguard, actor, singer, Protestant minister, fiber artist, and motivational speaker. He played professionally as a defensive tackle in the National Football League (NFL) for the New York Giants and Los Angeles Rams where he was a member of the original "Fearsome Foursome".

Grier played college football for the Penn State Nittany Lions, earning All-America honors and a place in the NCAA 100th anniversary list of 100 most influential student athletes. A professional football player for 12 seasons in the NFL, Grier was a member of the New York Giants and the original Fearsome Foursome of the Los Angeles Rams. He played in the Pro Bowl twice, was selected All-Pro multiple times, and won the 1956 NFL championship with the Giants in the pre Super Bowl era.

After Grier's professional sports career in the NFL, he worked as a bodyguard for Senator Robert Kennedy during the 1968 presidential campaign. Grier was guarding Ethel Kennedy when Senator Kennedy was shot. Although unable to prevent the assassination, Grier took control of the gun and subdued the shooter, Sirhan Sirhan.

Grier hosted his own Los Angeles television show and as an actor made approximately 70 appearances on various TV shows during the 1960s and 1970s.

Grier became an ordained Protestant minister in 1983. He founded American Neighborhood Enterprises, a nonprofit organization that serves inner city youth. He also travels as an inspirational speaker.

Among Grier's hobbies are crocheting, knitting, needlepoint and macramé. In 1972, Grier wrote Rosey Grier's Needlepoint for Men, a book that was published by Walker and Company on January 1, 1973.

== Early life ==
Grier was born on July 14, 1932, in Cuthbert, Georgia, one of twelve children. He was named after presidential candidate Franklin Delano Roosevelt.

Grier's father grew sugar cane and peanuts where Grier and his siblings worked. Due to the need to work and the distance to walk to school, Grier was only able to attend school three times a week at this time. After World War II, when Grier was still in elementary school, the family moved to Roselle, New Jersey for more stable work opportunities. Grier was able to attend school regularly and ultimately played football at Abraham Clark High School in Roselle and graduated in 1951.

While in high school, Grier became a star athlete. At 6'5" Grier played both offense and defense line positions. He studied smaller players and developed explosive speed and quick footwork for his size.

Grier also excelled in track and field in the shot put, discus, and javelin events in high school.

== Education and college career ==
Colleges began scouting Grier while in high school. Ultimately, Penn State University offered Grier a track scholarship, which he accepted, and also played football for the Nittany Lions where he was a four-year starter and All American (in shot put). Grier was known as a dominant lineman playing both ways. During Grier's time at Penn State under coach Rip Engle, from 1952 to 1953, the team had 20 wins, 7 losses, 1 tie.

- 1952 Penn State Nittany Lions football team
- 1953 Penn State Nittany Lions football team
- 1954 Penn State Nittany Lions football team

During these days of early desegregation, Grier had to deal with animosity from opponents, especially when travelling to away games in the South such as Texas Christian University (TCU) in Fort Worth, Texas.

Grier also excelled in track and field in shot put, discus, and javelin while at Penn State. He was captain of the track team. In track, he won the IC4A and Penn Relays shot put and discus, as well as qualifying for the javelin finals. He was a Track & Field All-American in 1954 and 1955.

Grier was a member of the Alpha Phi Alpha fraternity. Grier was noted as being engaging by other students and developed interests outside of sports that remains through his life. “He was a big human being,” Penn State teammate Lenny Moore said, “but just as nice and truthful as you could be.” Grier earned his degree in 1956.

== Professional football career ==
=== New York Giants 1955–62 ===
After playing college football at Penn State University, Grier was the 31st overall pick of the 1955 NFL draft, taken in the third round by the New York Giants. At the time Jim Lee Howell was the coach. He started in 85 games with the Giants as a defensive tackle from 1955 through 1962. This included playing in an NFL Championship in 1956 and five Eastern Conference titles (1956, 1958, 1959, 1961, 1962). As a stand out tackle, Grier worked with Tom Landry as Landry developed his flex defense later utilized with the Cowboys. Grier was selected for the Pro Bowl in 1956 and 1960, and was named All-Pro defensive tackle in 1956 and 1958–1962. The Giants defense at the time, had become so significant to their success that they began the then unheard of practice at the time of announcing the defense unit instead of the offense before the game.

- 1955 New York Giants
- 1956 New York Giants
- 1957 New York Giants
- 1958 New York Giants
- 1959 New York Giants
- 1960 New York Giants
- 1961 New York Giants
- 1962 New York Giants

=== Los Angeles Rams 1963–67 ===
After eight seasons with New York, Grier was traded in July 1963 to the Los Angeles Rams in exchange for defensive tackle John LoVetere and a high future draft pick. He was part of the "Fearsome Foursome", along with Deacon Jones, Merlin Olsen, and Lamar Lundy, considered one of the best defensive lines in football history. Dick Butkus described them as "the most dominant line in football history." His career ended in 1967 due to a torn Achilles tendon. Despite being the oldest member of the Fearsome Foursome, Grier is the last surviving member following the passing of Jones on June 3, 2013.

- 1963 Los Angeles Rams
- 1964 Los Angeles Rams
- 1965 Los Angeles Rams
- 1966 Los Angeles Rams

=== Statistics ===
Presently, Rosey Grier is one of the oldest living NFL players having spent his entire career in the NFL prior to the NFL-AFL merger. Though he did play in NFL Championship games, Grier never had a chance to play in a Super Bowl as his entire playing career pre-dated the Super Bowl era. During his playing years statistics were not tracked to the degree they are in the modern era. Known statistical highlights of Grier's NFL career include:

- 141 games
- 36.5 sacks
- 13 fumble recoveries
- 2 safeties

Grier played with number 76 all 11 years.

=== Football honors ===
- 1956 NFL Championship, New York Giants
- 1956 NFL Pro Bowl
- 1960 NFL Pro Bowl
- 1956 All-Pro, defensive tackle, New York Giants
- 1958 All Pro, defensive tackle, New York Giants
- 1959 All Pro, defensive tackle, New York Giants (2nd team)
- 1960 All Pro, defensive tackle, New York Giants (2nd team)
- 1961 All Pro, defensive tackle, New York Giants
- 1962 All Pro, defensive tackle, New York Giants (2nd team)
- 1963 All Pro, right defensive tackle, Los Angeles Rams
- 1973 Finalist to Pro Football Hall of Fame
- 2025 Senior Nominee for Pro Football Hall of Fame Class of 2025
- 2025 Named to New York Giants 100 List

== Post-football career ==
After a highly successful professional football career, Grier went on to have further successes in diverse fields. This ranged from acting as a bodyguard, television acting, and writing, speaking, and being a minister.

=== Television ===
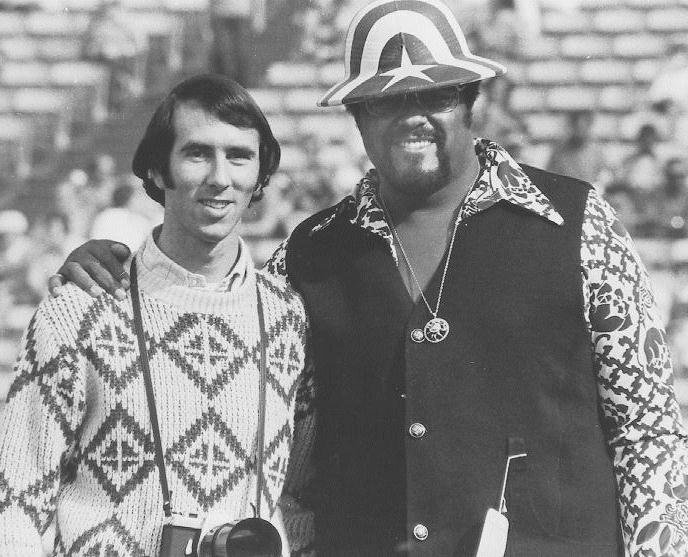
With Evan Freed (left) in 1967

After his retirement, Grier hosted the Rosey Grier Show for three seasons from 1968 to 1970 on KABC-TV, a weekly half-hour television show discussing community affairs in Los Angeles.

=== Bodyguard ===
Grier served as a bodyguard for his friend, United States senator and presidential candidate Robert F. Kennedy. He was guarding Ethel Kennedy, the Senator's wife, who was then expecting a child, the night that Kennedy was assassinated in Los Angeles in 1968. Grier and Olympic decathlon gold medalist Rafer Johnson heard shots fired ahead of them; Johnson rushed ahead to see what had happened. As Grier caught up he saw Johnson and sports-writer George Plimpton wrestling with gunman Sirhan Sirhan; Grier immediately jumped into the fray and Sirhan was overpowered, disarmed and subdued. Grier states, "So I see George Plimpton has the gun pointed at his face, and I'm concerned that it is going to go off, so I put my hand under the trigger housing and I pulled back the hammer so it couldn't strike. I wrench the gun from Sirhan. I find the pin and I ripped it out and held it. Now I have the gun in my hand, so I shove it in my pocket." Grier later said, "I grabbed the man's legs and dragged him onto a table. There was a guy angrily twisting the killer's legs and other angry faces coming towards him, as though they were going to tear him to pieces. I fought them off. I would not allow more violence."

=== USO ===
In December 1968, during the height of the Vietnam War, Grier accompanied Bob Hope on "Operation Holly," Hope's 1968 USO tour. Grier performed alongside headliner Ann-Margret and others at the U.S. military bases at Long Bình, Cam Ranh Bay, Da Nang, Chu Lai, and Phù Cát, as well as aboard the carrier USS Hancock and the battleship USS New Jersey, and at Korat Royal Thai Air Force Base and U-Tapao Royal Thai Navy Airfield in Thailand, along with stops in South Korea and Guam.

=== Acting ===
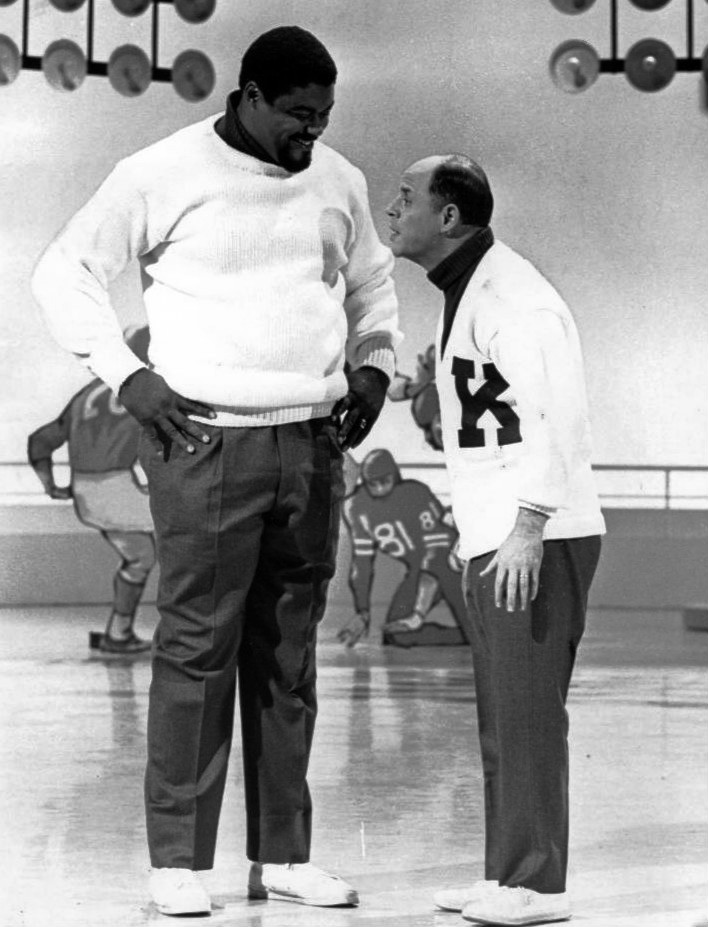
Grier and comedian Don Rickles in a Kraft Music Hall skit, 1968

Grier has appeared in a number of films and television shows. One of the first football stars to successfully make the transition to acting, he made about 70 television guest appearances. They include a role as one of the security contingent in "The Brain Killer Affair" episode of The Man from U.N.C.L.E. (1964), as well as a cameo playing an athletic trainer in an episode of I Dream of Jeannie. He became a regular cast member, starting in 1969, on the series Daniel Boone, Make Room for Granddaddy, and The White Shadow. In one White Shadow appearance, he donned his No. 76 Los Angeles Rams jersey from his NFL playing days.

Grier appeared as a panelist on the television game show Match Game 74. Grier starred in television shows and films including The Wild, Wild West (1967), The Desperate Mission (1969), Carter's Army (1970), Skyjacked (1972), The Thing with Two Heads (1972), McMillan & Wife (1974), Sesame Street (1975), The Treasure of Jamaica Reef (1975), The Love Boat (1979), The Glove (1979), Roots: The Next Generations (1979) and The Seekers (1979). Grier appeared in the 1974–1976 NBC TV series Movin' On with Claude Akins, which was filmed in Grier's home state of Georgia. He appeared in a third-season episode of Quincy, M.E. titled "Crib Job" in which he played himself as the director of a group called Giant Step. He appeared in two episodes of Kojak, one in the third season and one in the fourth season, as a bounty hunter named Salathiel Harms. He also appeared on a 1977 episode of CHiPs as a distraught motorist who, during a routine traffic stop, proceeds to destroy his car in frustration by pulling it apart piece by piece. He appeared as a celebrity contestant on Celebrity Bullseye during that program's 1981–82 season. In 1983 he also appeared in the series The Jeffersons, (episode 10x8 titled 'The List') as the owner of a pool hall in Harlem, who in the past had been a bully to George Jefferson at school. He made a guest appearance as himself on HBO's hit series, The Larry Sanders Show with Gary Shandling in 1998. Grier also guest-voiced a 1999 episode of The Simpsons titled "Sunday, Cruddy Sunday".

=== Singing ===
Grier first released singles on the A label in 1960, and over the following twenty-five years he continued to record on various labels including Liberty, Ric, MGM, and A&M. His recording of a tribute to Robert Kennedy, "People Make the World" (written by Bobby Womack), was his only chart single, peaking at No. 128 in 1968. Grier sang "It's All Right to Cry" for the children's album and TV program Free to Be… You and Me.

=== Politics ===
Grier spent his early life campaigning for Democrats before becoming a Republican in the early 1980s. He appeared in the Democratic fundraiser "America Goes Public" on September 15, 1973 and regularly attended the Democratic National Convention, including the conventions at the International Amphitheatre in Chicago on August 28, 1968 and at Madison Square Garden in New York City on August 11, 1980. Grier was a featured speaker at the 1984 Republican National Convention; during its evening session on August 20, 1984, he endorsed President Ronald Reagan for re-election.

==== O.J. Simpson trial ====
In 1994, Grier visited O. J. Simpson in jail, who allegedly yelled out a confession to the crime.

==== 2018 gubernatorial bid ====
On January 5, 2017, Grier announced his intention to run for governor of California as a Republican in the 2018 California gubernatorial election. He ended his candidacy in July 2017.

=== Author and speaker ===
Grier has written a number of books:

- Grier, Rosey (1973). Rosey Grier's Needlepoint for Men. Walker and Company. ISBN 0802704212.
- Grier, Rosey; Baker, Dennis (1986). Rosey, an Autobiography: The Gentle Giant. Honor Books. ISBN 9780892744060.
- Grier, Rosey; MacIas, Kathi (1990). Winning. Regal Books. ISBN 0830714375.
- Grier, Rosey (1993). Rosey Grier's All-American Heroes: Multicultural Success Stories. MasterMedia. ISBN 0942361636.
- Grier, Rosey; Mills, Kathi (1993). Shooting Star. T. Nelson. ISBN 0840777361.
- Grier, Rosey (2018). Life Through Rosey Colored Glasses. Trilogy Christian Publishing, Incorporated. ISBN 978-1640880030.

Grier also works as a motivational speaker.

== Community service ==
Grier is a cofounder of American Neighborhood Enterprises (ANE), an organization that works to help disadvantaged city dwellers buy homes and receive vocational training. Grier was ordained a Protestant minister in 1983, and the next year he founded his nonprofit resource center for inner-city teens, developing spiritual and educational programs for disadvantaged youths. Grier supports The Prostate Cancer Foundation with his time and effort.

He is also on the Milken Family Foundation board of trustees and serves as its program administrator of community affairs.

== Honors ==
In addition to his many football honors (see above), Grier is noted for the following honors:

- Grier has been honored by Penn State as recipient of the Distinguished Alumni Award in 1974, and the Alumni Fellow Award in 1991.
- Grier was named to the Giants Top 100 Players list.
- Grier was awarded an honorary Doctorate of the Letter of Law from Oral Roberts University in 1981.
- Grier was named to the Los Angeles Rams 40th Anniversary Team in 1985.
- In 1997, he was inducted into the New Jersey Sports Hall of Fame.
- He was named to the NCAA's "List of the 100 Most Influential Student-Athletes" in 2006, published to commemorate the NCAA's 100th anniversary.
- In 2009, Grier was inducted into the California Sports Hall of Fame.
- In 2017, he was inducted into the New Jersey Hall of Fame.

== Personal life ==
=== Family ===
Grier has a daughter, Sherryl Brown-Tubbs, from an early relationship. He married Beatrice Lewis in 1962. She had one child, Denise, whom Grier adopted. Grier and Lewis divorced in 1970. In 1973, Grier married Margie Grier; they had one son, Roosevelt Kennedy Grier, in 1972. The couple divorced in 1978. They remarried in 1981 and remained married until her death in 2011. Grier married Wichita school teacher, Cydnee Seyler, on April 30, 2013. Grier's nephew, Mike Grier, followed his uncle's career in sports when he enrolled as a student at Boston University, but he played ice hockey instead of football; he subsequently had a 14-year NHL playing career and became the league's first black general manager with the San Jose Sharks.

=== Hobbies ===
Grier was well known in the 1970s for his hobbies of needlepoint and macrame. He authored Rosey Grier's Needlepoint for Men in 1973.
