= Tom Hall (American football) =

American football player (1940–2017)

- Hall in 1963

No. 86, 28
- Position: Wide receiver

Personal information
- Born: April 3, 1940; Wilmington, Delaware, U.S.
- Died: December 14, 2017 (aged 77); Enfield, Connecticut, U.S.
- Listed height: 6 ft 1 in (1.85 m)
- Listed weight: 195 lb (88 kg)

Career information
- High school: Salesianum School (Wilmington)
- College: Minnesota
- NFL draft: 1962: 7th round, 94th overall pick
- AFL draft: 1962: 22nd round, 172nd overall pick

Career history
- Detroit Lions (1962–1963); Minnesota Vikings (1964–1966); New Orleans Saints (1967); Minnesota Vikings (1968–1969)

Awards and highlights
- NFL champion (1969); National champion (1960); First-team All-Big Ten (1961)

Career NFL statistics
- Receptions: 103
- Receiving yards: 1,441
- Touchdowns: 8
- Stats at Pro Football Reference

Thomas Francis Hall (April 3, 1940 – December 14, 2017) was a National Football League (NFL) wide receiver. He played eight seasons for the Detroit Lions (1962–1963), Minnesota Vikings (1964–1966, 1968–1969), and New Orleans Saints (1967). He played college football at the University of Minnesota.

In 1980, Hall was inducted into the Delaware Sports Hall of Fame. He died on December 14, 2017.
