= Terry Kosens =

American football player (1941–2004)

No. 26
- Position: Defensive back

Personal information
- Born: October 3, 1941; New York, New York, U.S.
- Died: December 4, 2004 (aged 63); Brightwaters, New York, U.S.
- Listed height: 6 ft 3 in (1.91 m)
- Listed weight: 195 lb (88 kg)

Career information
- High school: Chaminade (Mineola, New York)
- College: Hofstra
- NFL draft: 1963: 10th round, 128th overall pick

Career history
- Minnesota Vikings (1963); Jersey Jets (1965)
- Stats at Pro Football Reference

Theodore J. Kosens (October 3, 1941 – December 4, 2004) was an American football defensive back. He played for the Minnesota Vikings in 1963.

He died on December 4, 2004, in Brightwaters, New York at age 63.
