= 1961 Big Ten Conference football season =

- Sport: American football
- Teams: 10
- Top draft pick: Bob Ferguson
- Champion: Ohio State
- Runners-up: Minnesota
- Season MVP: Sandy Stephens

Seasons
- 1960 1962

1961 Big Ten Conference football standings
	Conf.					Overall
Team	W		L		T	W		L		T
No. 2 Ohio State $	6	–	0	–	0	8	–	0	–	1
No. 6 Minnesota	6	–	1	–	0	8	–	2	–	0
No. 8 Michigan State	5	–	2	–	0	7	–	2	–	0
No. 12 Purdue	4	–	2	–	0	6	–	3	–	0
Wisconsin	4	–	3	–	0	6	–	3	–	0
Michigan	3	–	3	–	0	6	–	3	–	0
Iowa	2	–	4	–	0	5	–	4	–	0
Northwestern	2	–	4	–	0	4	–	5	–	0
Indiana	0	–	6	–	0	2	–	7	–	0
Illinois	0	–	7	–	0	0	–	9	–	0
$ – Conference champion; Rankings from AP Poll

The 1961 Big Ten Conference football season was the 66th season of college football played by the member schools of the Big Ten Conference and was a part of the 1961 college football season.

The 1961 Ohio State Buckeyes football team, under head coach Woody Hayes, compiled an 8–0–1, won the Big Ten championship, and was recognized as the national champion by the Football Writers Association of America. Fullback Bob Ferguson was a consensus first-team All-American and won the Maxwell Award and the UPI and Sporting News College Football Player of the Year awards.

The 1961 Minnesota Golden Gophers football team, under head coach Murray Warmath, compiled an 8–2, was ranked No. 6 in the final AP Poll, and defeated UCLA in the 1962 Rose Bowl. Quarterback Sandy Stephens was a consensus first-team All-American and won the Chicago Tribune Silver Football award as the Big Ten's most valuable player. As of 2017, Stephens is the most recent Minnesota player to win the award.

Ron Miller of Wisconsin received the Sammy Baugh Trophy as the nation's top collegiate passer.

== Season overview ==
=== Results and team statistics ===
Conf. Rank	Team	Head coach	AP final	AP high	Overall record	Conf. record	PPG	PAG	MVP
1	Ohio State	Woody Hayes	#2	#2	8–0–1	4–2	**24.6**	9.2	Bob Ferguson
2	Minnesota	Murray Warmath	#6	#3	8–2	6–1	16.8	7.8	**Sandy Stephens**
3	Michigan State	Duffy Daugherty	#8	#1	7–2	5–2	21.3	**5.6**	George Saimes
4	Purdue	Jack Mollenkopf	#12	#7	6–3	4–2	16.2	9.7	Jack Elwell
5	Wisconsin	Milt Bruhn	NR	NR	6–4	4–3	19.9	17.6	Ron Miller
6	Michigan	Bump Elliott	NR	#6	6–3	3–3	23.6	18.1	John Walker
7 (tie)	Iowa	Jerry Burns	NR	#1	5–4	2–4	23.9	18.0	Al Hinton
7 (tie)	Northwestern	Ara Parseghian	NR	NR	4–5	2–4	14.6	11.7	Boyd Melvin
9	Indiana	Phil Dickens	NR	NR	2–7	0–6	10.7	18.0	Byron Broome
10	Illinois	Pete Elliott	NR	NR	0–9	0–7	5.9	32.1	Tony Parrilli

Key
AP final = Team's rank in the final AP Poll of the 1961 season
AP high = Team's highest rank in the AP Poll throughout the 1961 season
PPG = Average of points scored per game
PAG = Average of points allowed per game
MVP = Most valuable player as voted by players on each team as part of the voting process to determine the winner of the Chicago Tribune Silver Football trophy; trophy winner in bold

=== Preseason ===
On November 20, 1960, hours after the final game of the 1960 season, Iowa announced that Forest Evashevski would be replaced as head football coach by Jerry Burns. Evashevski remained at Iowa as the athletic director. Burns, who signed a three-year contract, had been an assistant coach under Evashevski since 1954 and had played at Michigan from 1947 to 1950.

In the preseason AP Poll, Iowa was ranked No. 1, and Ohio State was No. 2.

=== Post-season developments ===
There were no changes in the conference's head football coaches between the 1961 and 1962 seasons.

== Statistical leaders ==
The Big Ten's individual statistical leaders for the 1961 season include the following:

=== Passing yards ===
Rank	Name	Team	Yards
1	Ron Miller	Wisconsin	1,487
2	Matt Szykowny	Iowa	1,078
3	Sandy Stephens	Minnesota	869
4	Ron DiGravio	Purdue	861
5	Pete Smith	Michigan State	630

=== Rushing yards ===
Rank	Name	Team	Yards
1	Bob Ferguson	Ohio State	938
2	Sandy Stephens	Minnesota	533
3	Dave Raimey	Michigan	496
4	Roy Walker	Purdue	491
5	Bill Swingle	Northwestern	476

=== Receiving yards ===
Rank	Name	Team	Yards
1	Pat Richter	Wisconsin	817
2	Cloyd Webb	Iowa	425
3	Jack Elwell	Purdue	343
4	Chuck Bryant	Ohio State	270
5	Lonnie Sanders	Michigan State	247

=== Total yards ===
Rank	Name	Team	Yards
1	Ron Miller	Wisconsin	1,449
2	Sandy Stephens	Minnesota	1,402
3	Ron DiGravio	Purdue	980
4	Matt Szykowny	Iowa	956
5	Bob Ferguson	Ohio State	938

=== Scoring ===
Rank	Name	Team	Points
1	Bob Ferguson	Ohio State	66
2	Sandy Stephens	Minnesota	48
2	Joe Williams	Iowa	48
2	George Saimes	Michigan State	48
2	Pat Richter	Wisconsin	48

== Awards and honors ==
=== All-Big Ten honors ===
The following players were picked by the Associated Press (AP) and/or the United Press International (UPI) as first-team players on the 1961 All-Big Ten Conference football team.

Position	Name	Team	Selectors
Quarterback	Sandy Stephens	Minnesota	AP, UPI
Halfback	Bennie McRae	Michigan	AP, UPI
Halfback	George Saimes	Michigan State	AP, UPI
Fullback	Bob Ferguson	Ohio State	AP, UPI
End	Pat Richter	Wisconsin	AP, UPI
End	Jack Elwell	Purdue	AP
End	Tom Hall	Minnesota	UPI
Tackle	Bobby Bell	Minnesota	AP, UPI
Tackle	Dave Behrman	Michigan State	AP
Tackle	Fate Echols	Northwestern	UPI
Guard	Mike Ingram	Ohio State	AP, UPI
Guard	Stan Sezurek	Iowa	AP
Guard	Tony Parrilli	Illinois	UPI
Center	Larry Onesti	Northwestern	AP, UPI

=== All-American honors ===
At the end of the 1961 season, Big Ten players secured two of the 11 consensus first-team picks for the 1961 College Football All-America Team. The Big Ten's consensus All-Americans were:

Position	Name	Team	Selectors
Fullback	Bob Ferguson	Ohio State	AFCA, AP, FWAA, NEA, TSN, UPI, CP, Time, WCFF
Quarterback	Sandy Stephens	Minnesota	AP, FWAA, NEA, SN, UPI, WCFF

Other Big Ten players who were named first-team All-Americans by at least one selector were:

Position	Name	Team	Selectors
Tackle	Bobby Bell	Minnesota	AFCA, FWAA, TSN, CP
Guard	Dave Behrman	Michigan State	AP, FWAA
Center	Bill Van Buren	Iowa	TSN, CP
End	Pat Richter	Wisconsin	UPI
Tackle	Fate Echols	Northwestern	Time

=== Other awards ===
Ohio State fullback Bob Ferguson won the Maxwell Award and the UPI and Sporting News College Football Player of the Year awards. He finished second in the voting for the Heisman Trophy behind Ernie Davis.

Ron Miller of Wisconsin received the Sammy Baugh Trophy as the nation's top collegiate passer. He was the first Big Ten player to receive the award.

== 1962 NFL draft ==
The following Big Ten players were among the first 100 picks in the 1962 NFL draft:

Name	Position	Team	Round	Overall pick
Bob Ferguson	Back	Ohio State	1	5
Fate Echols	Tackle	Northwestern	1	6
Bennie McRae	Back	Michigan	2	21
Sandy Stephens	Back	Minnesota	2	25
Chuck Bryant	End	Ohio State	3	34
Larry Ferguson	Back	Iowa	4	52
Stan Sczurek	Guard	Purdue	4	53
Bill Tunnicliff	Running back	Michigan	5	63
Jon Schopf	Guard	Michigan	5	70
Larry Bowie	Tackle	Purdue	6	73
John Elwell	End	Purdue	6	75
Sam Tidmore	End	Ohio State	6	81
Sherwyn Thorson	Guard	Iowa	7	87
Jim Bakken	Quarterback	Wisconsin	7	88
Ed O'Bradovich	End	Illinois	7	91
Tom Hall	End	Minnesota	7	94
John Havlicek	Wide receiver	Ohio State	7	95
Ron Hatcher	Running back	Michigan State	8	99
