= 1961 Northwestern Wildcats football team =

American college football season

1961 Northwestern Wildcats football
- Conference: Big Ten Conference
- Record: 4–5 (2–4 Big Ten)
- Head coach: Ara Parseghian (6th season)
- MVP: Boyd "Bud" Melvin
- Captain: Larry Onesti
- Home stadium: Dyche Stadium

1961 Big Ten Conference football standings
	Conf.					Overall
Team	W		L		T	W		L		T
No. 2 Ohio State $	6	–	0	–	0	8	–	0	–	1
No. 6 Minnesota	6	–	1	–	0	8	–	2	–	0
No. 8 Michigan State	5	–	2	–	0	7	–	2	–	0
No. 12 Purdue	4	–	2	–	0	6	–	3	–	0
Wisconsin	4	–	3	–	0	6	–	3	–	0
Michigan	3	–	3	–	0	6	–	3	–	0
Iowa	2	–	4	–	0	5	–	4	–	0
Northwestern	2	–	4	–	0	4	–	5	–	0
Indiana	0	–	6	–	0	2	–	7	–	0
Illinois	0	–	7	–	0	0	–	9	–	0
$ – Conference champion; Rankings from AP Poll

The 1961 Northwestern Wildcats team was an American football team that represented Northwestern University during the 1961 Big Ten Conference football season. In their sixth year under head coach Ara Parseghian, the Wildcats compiled a 4–5 record (2–4 in conference games), and finished in a tie for seventh place in the Big Ten Conference. Northwestern played home games at Dyche Stadium in Evanston, Illinois.

Highlights of the season included a 45–0 victory over Boston College in the season opener and a narrow 12–10 victory over No. 8 Notre Dame. The Wildcats were 4–2 after six games, but then lost three consecutive games at the end of the season.

Senior center and middle linebacker Larry Onesti was the team captain and received first-team All-Big Ten honors. Senior tackle Boyd "Bud" Melvin was selected as the team's most valuable player.

== Schedule ==
Date	Opponent	Site	Result	Attendance	Source
September 30	Boston College*	Dyche Stadium; Evanston, IL	W 45–0	35,418	
October 7	at Illinois	Memorial Stadium; Champaign, IL (rivalry)	W 28–7	40,138	
October 14	Minnesota	Dyche Stadium; Evanston, IL	L 3–10	41,251	
October 21	No. 7 Ohio State	Dyche Stadium; Evanston, IL	L 0–10	43,259	
October 28	at No. 8 Notre Dame*	Notre Dame Stadium; Notre Dame, IN (rivalry)	W 12–10	59,075	
November 4	Indiana^{†}	Dyche Stadium; Evanston, IL	W 14–8	35,392	
November 11	Wisconsin	Dyche Stadium; Evanston, IL	L 10–29	46,203	
November 18	at No. 9 Michigan State	Spartan Stadium; East Lansing, MI	L 13–21	51,403	
November 24	at Miami (FL)*	Miami Orange Bowl; Miami, FL	L 6–10	46,282	
*Non-conference game; ^{†}Homecoming; Rankings from AP Poll released prior to the game

== Statistics ==
The team gained an average of 200.1 rushing yards and 80.6 passing yards per game. On defense, the Wildcats gave up an average of 155.6 rushing yards and 106.2 passing yards per game.

Though he did not become a starter until the sixth game of the season, sophomore quarterback Tom O'Grady led the team in total offense, tallying 322 passing yards and 283 rushing yards for a total of 605 yards. In his first start, he tallied 101 rushing yards and completed seven of 13 passes for 113 passing yards. For the entire season, he completed 28 of 59 passes (47.5%) with one touchdown pass and seven interceptions for a quarterback rating of 75.2.

Sophomore fullback Bill Swingle led Northwestern to a 45–0 victory over Boston College in the season opener, rushing for three touchdowns (including a school-record 95-yard touchdown run) and also passed for a touchdown. He later missed two games due to a cist on the back of his knee. He finished the season as the team's leading rusher with 476 rushing yards on 79 carries for an average of 6.0 yards per carry.

The team's leading receivers were Willie Stinson (10 receptions, 158 yards, 15.8-yard average), Chuck Logan (13 receptions, 130 yards, 10.0-yard average), and Dave Cox (9 receptions, 100 yards, 11.1-yard average).

== Awards and honors ==
Senior tackle Boyd "Bud" Melvin was selected as the most valuable player on the 1961 Northwestern team. He was a regular for Northwestern on offense in 1959 and 1960 as well and became a two-way player in 1961, playing on both offense and defense. Coach Ara Parseghian rated Melvin as the best blocker he had ever coached and added: "Melvin was like another coach on the field. He knew every player's assignment . . . I've never seen a more dedicated football player than Melvin."

Senior center and middle linebacker Larry Onesti was selected as the team captain. At the end of the season, Onesti was selected by both the Associated Press (AP) and United Press International (UPI) as the first-team center on the 1961 All-Big Ten Conference football team. Onesti later played four seasons in the American Football League for the Houston Oilers.

Tackle Fate Echols also received first-team All-Big Ten honors from the UPI. He was placed on the second team by the AP. Echols later played two seasons in the National Football League for the St. Louis Cardinals.

== Personnel ==
=== Players ===
The following 39 players received varsity letters for their participation on the 1961 Northwestern football team:

- Larry Benz, back
- Chuck Brainerd, back
- George Burman, tackle
- John Campbell, tackle
- Dave Cox, end
- Dave Damm, tackle
- Ray Dillon, end
- Lou Dineff, tackle
- Fate Echols, tackle
- Bob Eickhoff, back
- Paul Flatley, back
- Gerry Goshgarian, center
- Charles Hansen, guard
- Frank Johnson, back
- Al Kimbrough, back
- Richard Lawton, guard
- Charles Logan, end
- Dick Machalski, end
- Bob Mackall, back
- Boyd Melvin, tackle
- Richard Neeley, guard
- Tom O'Grady, quarterback
- Larry Onesti, center
- Burt Petkus, guard
- Kent Pike, guard
- Fred Quinn, back
- Pat Riley, end
- Jay Robertson, center
- Ike Smith, tackle
- Bob Snider, back
- Willie Stinson, back
- Bill Swingle, fullback
- George Thomas, tackle
- Ed Tuerk, center
- Dick Uhler, back
- Chuck Urbanic, guard
- Elliott Williams, back
- Larry Zeno, guard
- Tim Ziemke, end
