= 1961 Purdue Boilermakers football team =

American college football season

1961 Purdue Boilermakers football
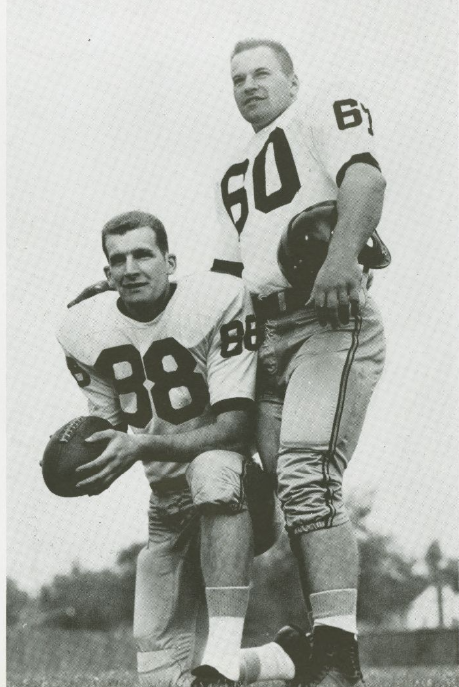
- Co-captains Jack Elwell (left, kneeling) and Stan Sczurek (right, standing)
- Conference: Big Ten Conference

Ranking
- Coaches: No. 11
- AP: No. 12
- Record: 6–3 (4–2 Big Ten)
- Head coach: Jack Mollenkopf (6th season)
- MVP: Jack Elwell
- Captains: Jack Elwell; Stan Sczurek
- Home stadium: Ross–Ade Stadium

1961 Big Ten Conference football standings
	Conf.					Overall
Team	W		L		T	W		L		T
No. 2 Ohio State $	6	–	0	–	0	8	–	0	–	1
No. 6 Minnesota	6	–	1	–	0	8	–	2	–	0
No. 8 Michigan State	5	–	2	–	0	7	–	2	–	0
No. 12 Purdue	4	–	2	–	0	6	–	3	–	0
Wisconsin	4	–	3	–	0	6	–	3	–	0
Michigan	3	–	3	–	0	6	–	3	–	0
Iowa	2	–	4	–	0	5	–	4	–	0
Northwestern	2	–	4	–	0	4	–	5	–	0
Indiana	0	–	6	–	0	2	–	7	–	0
Illinois	0	–	7	–	0	0	–	9	–	0
$ – Conference champion; Rankings from AP Poll

The 1961 Purdue Boilermakers football team was an American football team that represented Purdue University during the 1961 Big Ten Conference football season. In their sixth year under head coach Jack Mollenkopf, the Boilermakers compiled a 6–3 record (4–2 in conference games), finished fourth in the Big Ten, and outscored opponents by a total of 146 to 87. They were ranked No. 11 in the final UPI poll and No. 12 in the final AP poll.

Purdue won games against two ranked opponents (No. 5 Iowa and No. 6 Michigan State), and its three losses were to Notre Dame, Michigan and No. 5 Minnesota, each by a margin of two or three points.

End Jack Elwell and guard Stan Sczurek were the team's co-captains and the only Purdue players to receive first-team honors on the 1961 All-Big Ten Conference football team. Fullback Roy Walker led the team in both rushing (491 yards) and scoring (24 points).

The team played its home games at Ross–Ade Stadium in West Lafayette, Indiana.

== Schedule ==
Date	Opponent	Rank	Site	Result	Attendance	Source
September 23	at Washington*		Husky Stadium; Seattle, WA	W 13–6	55,000	
October 7	Notre Dame*		Ross–Ade Stadium; West Lafayette, IN (rivalry)	L 20–22	51,295	
October 14	Miami (OH)*		Ross–Ade Stadium; West Lafayette, IN	W 19–6	41,924	
October 21	at Michigan		Michigan Stadium; Ann Arbor, MI	L 14–16	66,805	
October 28	No. 5 Iowa^{†}		Ross–Ade Stadium; West Lafayette, IN	W 9–0	35,000 (attending), 50,127 (tickets sold)	
November 4	at Illinois		Memorial Stadium; Champaign, IL (rivalry)	W 23–9	35,077	
November 11	No. 6 Michigan State		Ross–Ade Stadium; West Lafayette, IN	W 7–6	45,638	
November 18	at No. 5 Minnesota	No. 7	Ross–Ade Stadium; West Lafayette, IN	L 7–10	67,081	
November 25	at Indiana		Seventeenth Street Stadium; Bloomington, IN (Old Oaken Bucket)	W 34–12	34,798–36,000	
*Non-conference game; ^{†}Homecoming; Rankings from AP Poll released prior to the game

== Statistics ==
The team's passing leaders were quarterback Ron DiGravio (52-for-100 for 861 yards, six touchdowns, two interceptions, 140.1 quarterback rating) and Gary Hogan (14-for-27, 236 yards, one touchdown, three interceptions, 115.3 quarterback rating).

The leading rushers were fullback Roy Walker (491 yards on 123 carries, 4.0-yard average), and Thomas Bloom (236 yards on 38 carries, 6-2-yard average).

The leading scorers were Roy Walker (24 points) and Jack Elwell and Ron DiGravo (18 points each).

== Awards ==
Guard and co-captain Stan "Stosh" Sczurek saw more action (380 minutes out of a possible 540) than any other player for the 1961 Boilermakers. He was the only Purdue player to win All-America honors in 1961, having been selected by both the Associated Press (AP) and United Press International (UPI) as a third-team guard on the 1961 All-America college football team. He also won the team's award as the outstanding lineman.

Senior end Jack Elwell, who led the team in receiving, was selected by his teammates as the team's most valuable player.

The following players were selected by either the AP or UPI on the 1961 All-Big Ten Conference football team: end Jack Elwell (AP-1, UPI-2); guard Stan Sczurek (AP-1, UPI-2); tackle Don Brumm (AP-2); and quarterback Ron DiGravio (UPI-3).

Purdue dominated the 1961 All-Indiana football team selected by The Indianapolis News with six first-team honorees: quarterback Ron DiGravio; halfback Dave Miller; fullback Roy Walker; end Jack Elwell; tackle Don Brumm; and guard Stan Sczurek. Four others were named to the second team: halfback Tom Bloom; center Don Paltani; end Forest Farmer; and guard Tom Krysinski.

== Personnel ==
=== Players ===
The following 38 players won major letters for their participation on the 1961 Purdue football team:

- Edward Behana, center, junior, 6'0", 195 pounds
- Tom Bloom, halfback, junior, 5'11", 183 pounds
- Tom Boris, back, sophomore, 6'1", 181 pounds
- Larry Bowie, tackle, senior, 6'2", 235 pounds
- Don Brumm, tackle, junior, 6'3", 214 pounds
- Richard E. Dauch, end, sophomore, 6'1", 211 pounds
- Ron DiGravio, quarterback, sophomore, 6'0", 178 pounds
- Gene Donaldson, back
- Henry Dudgeon, center, sophomore, 6'1", 206 pounds
- Jack Elwell, end, senior, 6'3", 204 pounds
- Forest Farmer, end, junior, 6'1", 208 pounds
- Wally Florence, guard, sophomore, 6'2", 194 pounds
- John Greiner, end, junior, 6'2", 211 pounds
- Fred Hanley
- Dave Hoehnen, back, senior, 6'1", 206 pounds
- Gary Hogan, quarterback, sophomore, 6'0", 195 pounds
- Don Keiser, tackle, junior, 6'4", 230 pounds
- Tom Kotoske
- Tom Krysinski, guard, senior, 5'11", 211 pounds
- James Kubinski, end, senior, 5'11", 188 pounds
- Lang Marks, back, junior, 5'10", 183 pounds
- John Marra
- Herbert McGuire
- Ron Meyer, quarterback, junior, 5'10", 172 pounds
- Dave Miller, halfback, junior, 5'10", 173 pounds
- Omer "Skip" Ohi, guard, junior, 5'8", 212 pounds
- Don Paltani, center, junior, 6'0", 214 pounds
- Frank Plaskon
- Pat Russ, tackle, junior, 6'3", 237 pounds
- Stan Sczurek, guard, senior, 5'11", 208 pounds
- Ronald Skufca, tackle, junior, 6'3", 253 pounds
- John Stafford, guard, junior, 6'0", 203 pounds
- Roy Walker, fullback, junior, 5'11", 213 pounds
- Steve Weil, back, junior, 6'1", 182 pounds
- Harold Wells, end, sophomore, 6'2", 218 pounds
- Bob Wiater, back, junior, 5'11", 191 pounds
- Dennis Wierzal
- John Wilson

=== Coaches and staff ===
- Head coach - Jack Mollenkopf

Note: Assistant coach Bob DeMoss served as acting head coach for part of the season due to a surgery on head coach Mollenkopf.

- Assistant coaches - Allen Hager, Dale Samuels, Bernie Crimmins, Bob DeMoss, Ned Maloney, and Donald E. Fuoss.
- Athletic director - Guy "Red" Mackey
