= 1961 Iowa Hawkeyes football team =

American college football season

1961 Iowa Hawkeyes football
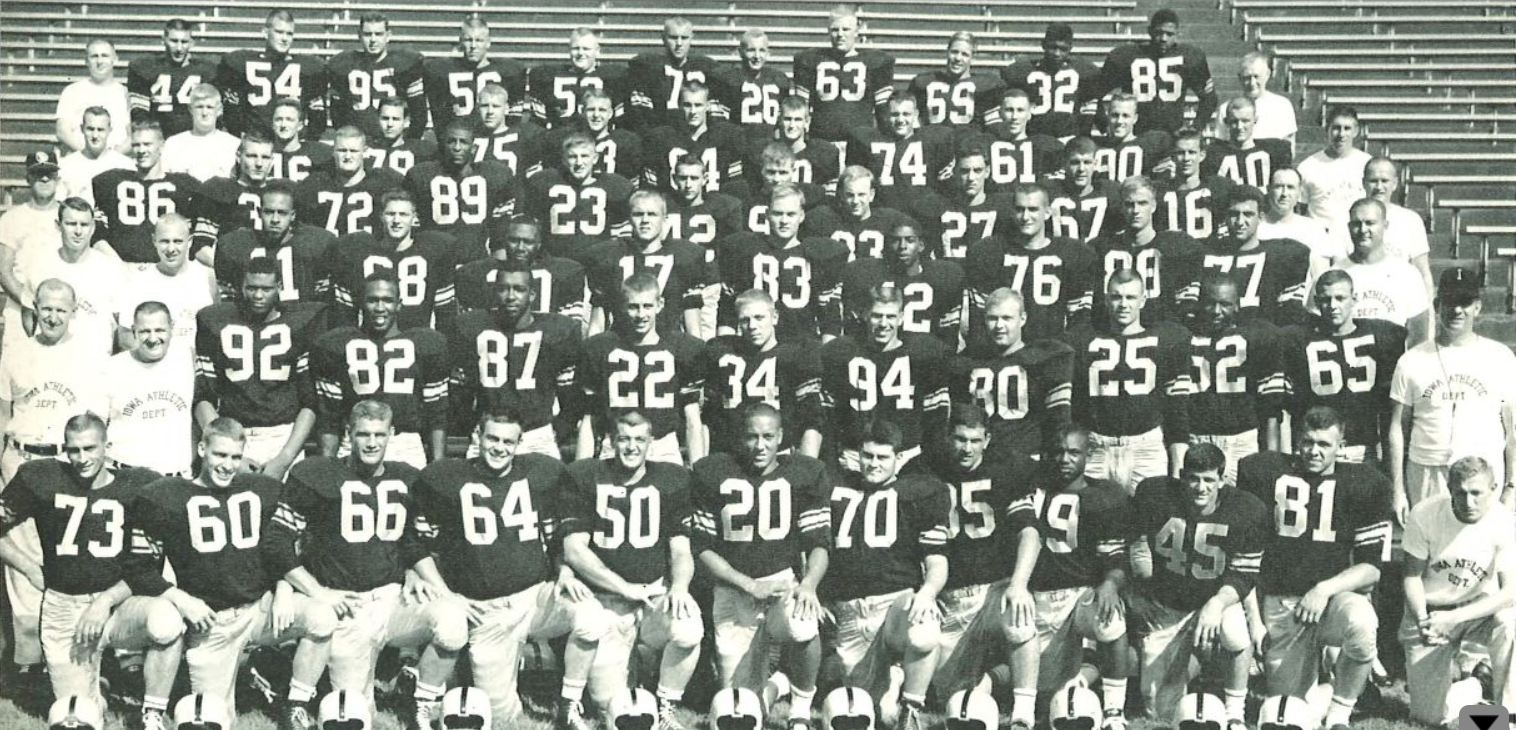
- Conference: Big Ten Conference
- Record: 5–4 (2–4 Big Ten)
- Head coach: Jerry Burns (1st season)
- MVP: Al Hinton
- Captains: Bill Van Buren; Wilburn Hollis
- Home stadium: Iowa Stadium

1961 Big Ten Conference football standings
	Conf.					Overall
Team	W		L		T	W		L		T
No. 2 Ohio State $	6	–	0	–	0	8	–	0	–	1
No. 6 Minnesota	6	–	1	–	0	8	–	2	–	0
No. 8 Michigan State	5	–	2	–	0	7	–	2	–	0
No. 12 Purdue	4	–	2	–	0	6	–	3	–	0
Wisconsin	4	–	3	–	0	6	–	3	–	0
Michigan	3	–	3	–	0	6	–	3	–	0
Iowa	2	–	4	–	0	5	–	4	–	0
Northwestern	2	–	4	–	0	4	–	5	–	0
Indiana	0	–	6	–	0	2	–	7	–	0
Illinois	0	–	7	–	0	0	–	9	–	0
$ – Conference champion; Rankings from AP Poll

The 1961 Iowa Hawkeyes football team was an American football team that represented the University of Iowa as a member of the Big Ten Conference during the 1961 Big Ten football season. In their first year under head coach Jerry Burns, the Hawkeyes compiled a 5–4 record (2–4 in conference game), tied for seventh place in the Big Ten, and outscored opponents by a total of 215 to 162. The team was ranked No. 1 in the AP poll at the start of the season but dropped out of the polls after losing four consecutive games. This would be the last time the Hawkeyes would finish with a winning record or ranked until 1981.

The 1960 Hawkeyes gained 1,509 rushing yards and 1,319 passing yards. On defense, they gave up 1,493 rushing yards and 858 passing yards. The pass defense of 95.3 yards per game is the eighth best in Iowa history.

The team's statistical leaders included quarterback Matt Szykowny (79-of-120 passing, 1,078 yards), fullback Bill Perkins (380 rushing yards), end Cloyd Webb (25 receptions for 425 yards), and fullback Joe Williams (54 points scored, including a 100-yard kickoff return for touchdown against Notre Dame). Senior center Bill Van Buren was selected by The Sporting News as a first-team All-American. Senior tackle Al Hinton was selected as the team's most valuable player. Van Buren and quarterback Wilburn Hollis were the team captains.

The team played its home games at Iowa Stadium in Iowa City, Iowa. Home attendance totaled 290,250, an average of 58,050 per game. The per game attendance from 1961 was a school record until 1979.

== Schedule ==
Date	Opponent	Rank	Site	TV	Result	Attendance	Source
September 30	California*	No. 1	Iowa Stadium; Iowa City, IA		W 28–7	56,000	
October 7	at USC*	No. 1	Los Angeles Memorial Coliseum; Los Angeles, CA	ABC	W 35–34	30,263	
October 14	Indiana	No. 2	Iowa Stadium; Iowa City, IA		W 27–8	56,000	
October 21	Wisconsin^{†}	No. 4	Iowa Stadium; Iowa City, IA (rivalry)		W 47–15	60,150	
October 28	at Purdue	No. 5	Ross–Ade Stadium; West Lafayette, IN		L 0–9	35,000 (attending), 50,127 (tickets sold)	
November 4	at No. 5 Ohio State	No. 9	Ohio Stadium; Columbus, OH		L 13–29	83,795	
November 11	No. 5 Minnesota		Iowa Stadium; Iowa City, IA (rivalry)	ABC	L 9–16	67,081	
November 18	at Michigan		Michigan Stadium; Ann Arbor, MI		L 14–23	61,925	
November 25	Notre Dame*		Iowa Stadium; Iowa City, IA		W 42–21	58,000	
*Non-conference game; ^{†}Homecoming; Rankings from AP Poll released prior to the game

== Rankings ==
Ranking movements Legend: ██ Increase in ranking ██ Decrease in ranking — = Not ranked RV = Received votes ( ) = First-place votes
	Week											
Poll	Pre	1	2	3	4	5	6	7	8	9	10	Final
AP	1 (22)	1 (19)	1 (24)	2 (11)	4 (2)	5 (1)	9	RV	—	—	—	—
Coaches					6	5						—

== Game summaries ==
=== at No. 5 Ohio State ===
Iowa at Ohio State

Team	1	2	3	4	Total
No. 9 Hawkeyes	0	0	7	6	13
• No. 5 Buckeyes	6	6	0	17	29

- Date: November 4
- Location: Ohio Stadium, Columbus, Ohio
- Game attendance: 83,795
- Game weather: Cloudy; 46 °F (8 °C); wind 5 mph E

Scoring summary
Q1	11:07	OHST	Perdue 55-yard fumble return (kick failed)	OHST 6–0
Q2	6:35	OHST	Bryant 18-yard pass from Sparma (kick failed)	OHST 12–0
Q3	6:18	IOWA	Szykowny 1-yard run (Szykowny kick)	OHST 12–7
Q4	14:39	OHST	Bryant 62-yard pass from Sparma (Van Raaphorst kick)	OHST 19–7
Q4	8:04	OHST	Van Raaphorst 24-yard field goal	OHST 22–7
Q4	1:55	OHST	Ferguson 13-yard run (Van Raaphorst kick)	OHST 29–7
Q4	:12	IOWA	Turici 4-yard run (kick failed)	OHST 29–13

== Statistics ==
The 1961 Iowa Hawkeyes tallied 2,828 yards of total offense (314.2 yards per game), consisting of 1,509 rushing yards and 1,319 passing yards. On defense, they held opponents to 2,251 yards with 1,493 rushing yards and 858 passing yards.

Matt Szykowny replaced Wilburn Hollis at quarterback in the third game of the season, following an injury to Hollis. Szykowny completed 79 of 120 passes for 1,078 yards, seven touchdowns and 15 interceptions. Before being lost to injury, Hollis completed six of 15 passes for 130 yards; Hollis also gained 187 rushing yards on 35 carries for a 5.3-yard average.

Halfback Larry Ferguson, a first-team All-American in 1960, was expected to be Iowa's lead back for 1961, but he was injured in the opening minutes of the season's first game, ending his season with 35 yards gained on only three carries. In Ferguson's absence, Iowa's rushing leaders were junior fullback Bill Perkins (380 yards, 62 carries, 6.1-yard average), fullback Joe Williams (297 yards, 64 carries, 4.6-yard average), Sammie Harris (267 rushing yards, 76 carries, 3.5-yard average), and Paul Krause (208 yards, 33 carries, 4.7-yard average).

Sophomore end Cloyd Webb led the team in receiving with 25 catches for 426 yards and four touchdowns. Iowa's other leading receivers were Bill Whisler (18 receptions, 244 yards) and Felton Rogers (12 receptions, 121 yards).

Joe Williams tallied 54 points on nine touchdowns and was the second highest scorer in the Big Ten. Iowa's other leading scorerrs were Matt Szykowny (46 points) and Cloyd Webb (24 points).

== Awards ==
Bill Van Buren was selected by both the Sporting News and the Central Press as the first-team center on the 1961 All-America college football team.

Sherwyn Thorson was selected by the Associated Press as a second-team guard on the 1961 All-Big Ten Conference football team.

Senior tackle Al Hinton from Saginaw, Michigan, was selected as the most valuable player on the 1961 Iowa team.

Guard Sherwyn Thorson was selected by the AP as a second-tem player on the 1961 All-Big Ten Conference football team.

Bill Van Buren and Wilburn Hollis were the team captains.

== Personnel ==
=== Players ===
The following 31 players received major letters for their participation on the 1961 Iowa team:

- Kevin Barbera, end, senior
- John Calhoun (#25), quarterback, junior, 6'2", 176 pounds
- Bill Cervenak (#96), end, senior, 6'4", 220 pounds
- Bill DiCindio (#64), tackle, senior, 6'1", 205 pounds
- Sammie Harris (#11), halfback, junior, 6'0", 181 pounds
- Jim Helgens (#90), end, sophomore, 6'2", 190 pounds
- Wally Hilgenberg (#67), guard, sophomore, 6'2", 215 pounds
- Al Hinton (#71), tackle, senior, 6'1", 217 pounds
- Wilburn Hollis (#20), quarterback, senior, 6'2", 200 pounds
- Gus Kasapis (#77), tackle, sophomore, 6'3", 235 pounds
- Paul Krause (#16), halfback, sophomore, 6'3", 177 pounds
- George Latta (#78), tackle, sophomore, 6'1", 220 pounds
- Lynn Lyon (#88), end, junior, 6'5", 194 pounds
- Earl McQuiston (#65), guard, junior, 6'2", 221 pounds
- Bill Perkins (#82), fullback/end, junior, 6'2", 197 pounds
- Dayton Perry Jr. (#52), center, junior, 6'1", 212 pounds
- Emery Pudder (#73), tackle, senior, 6'2", 206 pounds
- Mike Reilly (#61), guard, sophomore, 6'2", 200 pounds
- Felton Rogers (#89), end, junior, 6'4", 184 pounds
- Lonnie Rogers (#44), halfback, sophomore, 5'11", 185 pounds
- Matt Szykowny (#22), quarterback, junior, 6'1", 182 pounds
- Sherwyn Thorson (#66), guard, senior, 6'0", 210 pounds
- Dick Turici, fullback (#34), junior, 6'0", 195 pounds
- Bill Van Buren (#50), center, senior, 6'3", 210 pounds
- Dave Watkins, end, senior, 200 pounds
- Cloyd Webb (#85), end, sophomore, 6'3", 190 pounds
- Bill Whisler (#81), end, senior, 6'2", 219 pounds
- Jerry Williams (#60), guard, senior, 6'0", 180 pounds
- Joe Williams (#30), fullback, junior, 5'10", 191 pounds
- Bernie Wyatt (#45), halfback, senior, 5'10", 164 pounds
- Bob Yauck (#70), tackle, senior, 5'11", 219 pounds

=== Coaches ===
- Jerry Burns - head coach
- Jerry Hilgenberg - assistant coach, defense (brother of Wally Hilgenberg)
- Archie Kodros - assistant coach, scout
- Whitey Piro - assistant coach, scout
- Tom Moore – graduate assistant

== 1962 NFL draft ==
Player	Position	Round	Pick	NFL club
Larry Ferguson	Back	4	52	Detroit Lions
Sherwyn Thorson	Guard	7	87	Los Angeles Rams
Wilburn Hollis	Quarterback	9	118	St. Louis Cardinals
Bill Whisler	End	13	169	Washington Redskins
