= 1961 Michigan Wolverines football team =

American college football season

1961 Michigan Wolverines football
- Conference: Big Ten Conference
- Record: 6–3 (3–3 Big Ten)
- Head coach: Bump Elliott (3rd season)
- MVP: John Walker
- Captain: George Mans
- Home stadium: Michigan Stadium

1961 Big Ten Conference football standings
	Conf.					Overall
Team	W		L		T	W		L		T
No. 2 Ohio State $	6	–	0	–	0	8	–	0	–	1
No. 6 Minnesota	6	–	1	–	0	8	–	2	–	0
No. 8 Michigan State	5	–	2	–	0	7	–	2	–	0
No. 12 Purdue	4	–	2	–	0	6	–	3	–	0
Wisconsin	4	–	3	–	0	6	–	3	–	0
Michigan	3	–	3	–	0	6	–	3	–	0
Iowa	2	–	4	–	0	5	–	4	–	0
Northwestern	2	–	4	–	0	4	–	5	–	0
Indiana	0	–	6	–	0	2	–	7	–	0
Illinois	0	–	7	–	0	0	–	9	–	0
$ – Conference champion; Rankings from AP Poll

The 1961 Michigan Wolverines football team represented the University of Michigan in the 1961 Big Ten Conference football season. In its third year under head coach Bump Elliott, Michigan compiled a 6–3 record (3–3 against conference opponents), finished in sixth place in the Big Ten, and outscored opponents by a combined total of 212 to 163.

After opening the season with convincing wins over No. 9 UCLA (29–6) and Army (38–8), Michigan was ranked No. 2 in the Coaches Poll. The team fell from the rankings after being shut out by Michigan State (0–28) the following week.

Right end George Mans was the team captain, and center/guard John Walker received the team's most valuable player award. Left halfback Bennie McRae was selected by both the Associated Press and United Press International (UPI) as a first-team player on the 1961 All-Big Ten Conference football team. Fullback Bill Tunicliff also received second-team honors from the UPI.

The team's statistical leaders included Dave Glinka with 588 passing yards, Dave Raimey with 496 rushing yards and 36 points scored, and Bennie McRae with 210 receiving yards.

== Schedule ==
Date	Opponent	Rank	Site	Result	Attendance
September 30	No. 9 UCLA*		Michigan Stadium; Ann Arbor, MI	W 29–6	73,019
October 7	Army*	No. 9	Michigan Stadium; Ann Arbor, MI	W 38–8	65,012
October 14	No. 5 Michigan State	No. 6	Michigan Stadium; Ann Arbor, MI (rivalry)	L 0–28	103,198
October 21	Purdue^{†}		Michigan Stadium; Ann Arbor, MI	W 16–14	66,805
October 28	at Minnesota		Memorial Stadium; Minneapolis, MN (Little Brown Jug)	L 20–23	63,898
November 4	Duke*		Michigan Stadium; Ann Arbor, MI	W 28–14	56,488
November 11	at Illinois		Memorial Stadium; Champaign, IL (rivalry)	W 38–6	40,179
November 18	Iowa		Michigan Stadium; Ann Arbor, MI	W 23–14	61,925
November 25	No. 2 Ohio State		Michigan Stadium; Ann Arbor, MI (rivalry)	L 20–50	80,444
*Non-conference game; ^{†}Homecoming; Rankings from AP Poll released prior to the game

== Season summary ==
=== Preseason ===
The 1960 Michigan Wolverines football team compiled a 5–4 record and tied for fifth place in the Big Ten. At the end of the 1960 season, end George Mans was selected by his teammates to be the captain of the 1961 team.

Michigan's 1961 recruiting class included Mel Anthony, Jim Conley, John Henderson, Arnie Simkus, and Bob Timberlake.

In May 1961, halfback Dave Raimey received the Meyer W. Morton Trophy as the player who showed the most improvement in spring practice.

In June 1961, halfback Harvey E. Chapman received the John F. Maulbetsch Scholarship, presented each year to a freshman player "on the basis of scholarship, need, and promise and desire for leadership."

=== Week 1: UCLA ===
Team	1	2	3	4	Total
UCLA	0	0	0	6	6
• Michigan	13	3	13	0	29

- Date: September 30
- Location: Michigan Stadium
- Game attendance: 73,019

On September 30, 1961, Michigan opened its season with a 29–6 victory over 1961 AAWU champion UCLA (ranked No. 9 in the AP Poll) before a crowd of 73,019 (including 13,000 high school band members) at Michigan Stadium. Michigan gained 253 yards, including 227 rushing yards, and held UCLA to 172 total yards. The Wolverines took a 16–0 lead at halftime on touchdowns by Bill Tunnicliff (one-yard run) and Dave Raimey (20-yard run) and a 29-yard field goal by Douglas Bickle. Michigan extended its lead to 29 points in the third quarter on a four-yard touchdown run by Bennie McRae and a 92-yard interception return by Ken Tureaud. UCLA scored its lone touchdown in the fourth quarter on a one-yard run by Dimkich.

=== Week 2: Army ===
Team	1	2	3	4	Total
Army	0	0	8	0	8
• Michigan	10	7	14	7	38

- Date: October 7
- Location: Michigan Stadium
- Game attendance: 65,012

On October 7, 1961, Michigan defeated Army, 38–8, before a crowd of 65,012 at Michigan Stadium. Michigan's point total was its highest in 39 games, dating back to 1956. Michigan touchdowns were scored by Dave Raimey (13-yard run), Bennie McRae (47-yard run), Bill Tunnicliff (three-yard run), Bruce McLenna (seven-yard run), and Bob Brown (36-yard pass from Bob Chandler). Doug Bickle added a field goal and five extra points.

=== Week 3: Michigan State ===
Team	1	2	3	4	Total
• Michigan State	14	7	0	7	28
Michigan	0	0	0	0	0

- Date: October 14
- Location: Michigan Stadium
- Game attendance: 103,198

On October 14, 1961, Michigan (ranked No. 6 in the AP Poll) lost to Michigan State (ranked No. 5), 28–0, before a crowd of 103,198 and a national television audience at Michigan Stadium. The Spartans led, 14–0, at the end of the first quarter and 21–0 at halftime. Michigan was held to 92 rushing yards and 84 passing yards.

=== Week 4: Purdue ===
Team	1	2	3	4	Total
Purdue	0	7	7	0	14
• Michigan	9	0	7	0	16

- Date: October 21
- Location: Michigan Stadium
- Game attendance: 66,805

On October 21, 1961, Michigan defeated Purdue, 16–14, before a crowd of 66,805 at Michigan Stadium. Michigan opened the scoring with a safety in the first quarter, when Purdue fumbled a pitchout in the end zone. Dave Raimey also scored in the opening quarter on a one-yard run. Bennie McRae caught six passes for 144 yards, including a touchdown reception that covered 72 yards in the third quarter.

=== Week 5: at Minnesota ===
Team	1	2	3	4	Total
Michigan	0	7	7	0	14
• Minnesota	9	0	7	0	16

- Date: October 28
- Location: Minneapolis
- Game attendance: 63,898

On October 28, 1961, Michigan lost to Minnesota, 23–20, at Memorial Stadium in Minneapolis. Michigan led, 20–8, through the first three quarters as Tunnicliff ran eight yards for a touchdown and Dave Raimey scored twice on runs of 27 and four yards. Late in the fourth quarter, Michigan stopped a Minnesota drive at the nine-yard line, but Bennie McRae fumbled on the first play after Michigan took over, and Minnesota scored the winning touchdown with one minute and 24 seconds remaining.

=== Week 6: Duke ===
Team	1	2	3	4	Total
Duke	0	0	6	8	14
• Michigan	7	14	0	7	28

- Date: November 4
- Location: Michigan Stadium
- Game attendance: 56,488

On November 4, 1961, Michigan defeated 1961 ACC champion Duke, 28–14, before a crowd of 56,488 at Michigan Stadium. Bennie McRae scored three touchdowns on a five-yard run in the first quarter, a 15-yard pass from Dave Glinka in the second quarter, and a 34-yard interception return in the second quarter. Dave Raimey also rushed for 116 yards on 15 carries.

=== Week 7: at Illinois ===
Team	1	2	3	4	Total
• Michigan	7	7	10	14	38
Illinois	0	0	0	6	6

- Date: October 28
- Location: Champaign, Illinois
- Game attendance: 40,179

On November 11, 1961, Michigan defeated Illinois, 38–6, before a crowd of 40,179 at Memorial Stadium in Champaign, Illinois. The outcome was the second consecutive Michigan victory in the seven-year rivalry between head coaching brothers Bump Elliott and Pete Elliott. Michigan played all 38 players who traveled to Champaign in an effort to keep the score down. Michigan gained 309 rushing yards and held Illinois to 55 rushing yards. Dave Raimey began the scoring on a 54-yard punt return. J. Paul Raeder scored two touchdowns, and George Mans caught a touchdown pass from Dave Glinka.

=== Week 8: Iowa ===
Team	1	2	3	4	Total
Iowa	7	7	0	0	14
• Michigan	3	0	13	7	23

- Date: November 18
- Location: Michigan Stadium
- Game attendance: 61,925

On November 18, 1961, Michigan defeated Iowa, 23–14, before a crowd of 61,925 at Michigan Stadium. Iowa was led by first-year head coach Jerry Burns who had played quarterback for Michigan. Michigan lost Bennie McRae with a shoulder separation in the first quarter, and Iowa took a 14–3 lead at halftime. Michigan rallied with three unanswered touchdowns in the second half. Dave Glinka ran 44 yards for his first collegiate touchdown. Dave Raimey totaled 102 rushing yards and scored on a one-yard run (set up by a 54-yard run by Harvey Chapman). Glinka threw a touchdown pass to Bob Brown that covered 20 yards. Iowa was held to two first downs and negative 16 rushing yards in the second half. Michigan outgained Iowa by 266 rushing yards to 97. In the Detroit Free Press, Joe Falls praised the courage of Bump Elliott's team and called the game "Elliott's finest victory of the season."

=== Week 9: Ohio State ===
Team	1	2	3	4	Total
• Ohio State	7	14	0	29	50
Michigan	0	6	6	8	20

- Date: November 25
- Location: Michigan Stadium
- Game attendance: 80,444

On November 25, 1961, Michigan lost to Ohio State, 50–20, before a crowd of 80,444 at Michigan Stadium. Ohio State fullback Bob Ferguson scored four touchdowns in the game. The Buckeyes' 50 points was the fourth highest point total allowed by a Michigan team up to that time, with two of the prior occasions occurring in the 1890s. Michigan's three touchdowns were scored on a 90-yard kickoff return by Dave Raimey and one-yard runs by Bruce McLenna and James Ward.

=== Post-season ===
At the end of the 1961 season, center and linebacker John Walker received the team's most valuable player award.

Halfback Bennie McRae received first-team honors from both the Associated Press (AP) and United Press International (UPI) on the 1961 All-Big Ten Conference football team. Halfback Dave Raimey received second-team honors from the AP and UPI, and fullback Bill Tunicliff received second team honors from the UPI.

== Statistical leaders ==
Michigan's individual statistical leaders for the 1961 season include those listed below.

=== Rushing ===
Player	Attempts	Net yards	Yards per attempt	Touchdowns
Dave Raimey	99	496	5.0	6
Bennie McRae	75	453	6.0	3
Bill Tunnicliff	96	396	4.1	3

=== Passing ===
Player	Attempts	Completions	Interceptions	Comp %	Yards	Yds/Comp	TD	Long
Dave Glinka	96	46	5	47.9	588	12.8	5	72
Bob Chandler	11	6	0	54.5	100	16.7	1	36

=== Receiving ===
Player	Receptions	Yards	Yds/Recp	TD	Long
Bennie McRae	10	210	21.0	2	72
George Mans	14	138	9.9	1	16
Robert Brown	5	110	22.0	2	45

=== Kickoff returns ===
Player	Returns	Yards	Yds/Return	TD	Long
Dave Raimey	10	308	30.8	1	90
Bennie McRae	8	148	18.5	0	29
Ed Hood	1	42	42.0	0	42

=== Punt returns ===
Player	Returns	Yards	Yds/Return	TD	Long
Dave Raimey	7	92	13.1	1	54
Bennie McRae	10	39	3.9	0	11
Harvey Chapman	4	32	8.0	0	17

=== Scoring ===
Player	Touchdowns	Extra points	Field goals	Points
Dave Raimey	8	0	0	48
Bennie McRae	6	0	0	36
Doug Bickle	0	20-23	4-7	32

== Personnel ==
=== Letter winners ===
The following 40 players received varsity letters for their participation on the 1961 team. Players who started at least four games are shown with their names in bold.

- **Doug Bickle**, 6'3", 210 pounds, sophomore, Traverse City, MI - started 4 games at right tackle, 3 games at left tackle
- Robert M. Brown, 6'4", 225 pounds, senior, Kalamazoo, MI - end
- Bob Chandler, 6'3", 210 pounds, junior, LaGrange Park, IL - quarterback
- Harvey Chapman, 5'11", 175 pounds, sophomore, Farmington Hills, MI - started 1 game at left halfback
- Guy Curtis, 6'0", 215 pounds, senior, South Bend, IN - tackle
- William Dougall Jr., 6'2", 190 pounds, senior, Detroit - quarterback
- Dave Glinka, 5'11", 195 pounds, junior, Toledo, OH - started 2 games at quarterback
- **Todd Grant**, 6'4", 230 pounds, senior, Lathrup Village, MI - started 6 games at center
- **Lee Hall**, 6'0", 210 pounds, senior, Charlotte, MI - started 5 games at right guard, 3 games at left guard
- Edward Hood, 5'9", 175 pounds, junior, Detroit - halfback
- William Hornbeck, 6'1", 185 pounds, senior, Los Angeles - halfback
- **John Houtman**, 6'4", 235 pounds, junior, Adrian, MI - started 6 games at left tackle
- Tom Keating, 6'3", 220 pounds, sophomore, Chicago - tackle
- James Korowin, 6'2", 195 pounds, senior, Wyandotte, MI - end
- Dave Kurtz, 6'0", 201 pounds, sophomore, Toledo, OH - started 1 game at right guard
- John J. Lehr, 6'0", 225 pounds, junior, Cincinnati - tackle
- **Scott Maentz**, 6'3", 230 pounds, senior, East Grand Rapids, MI - started 9 games at left end
- Frank Maloney, 5'11", 195 pounds, senior, Chicago - started 1 game at right guard
- **George Mans**, 6'4", 212 pounds, senior, Trenton, MI - started 9 games at right end
- Bruce McLenna, 6'3", 218 pounds, sophomore, Fenton, MI - halfback
- **Bennie McRae**, 6'0", 172 pounds, senior, Newport News, VA - started 8 games at left halfback
- **John Minko**, 6'1", 222 pounds, junior, Connellsville, PA - started 6 games at left guard
- Delbert Nolan, 5'11", 205 pounds, sophomore, Clare, MI - guard
- Joe O'Donnell - started 1 game at right guard
- Thomas Prichard, 5'10", 198 pounds, sophomore, Marion, OH - quarterback
- **Jim Raeder**, 5'11", 190 pounds, senior, Lorain, OH - started 4 games at fullback
- **Dave Raimey**, 5'10", 195 pounds, junior, Dayton, OH - started 9 games at right halfback
- Paul Schmidt, 6'4", 245 pounds, senior, Skokie, IL - tackle
- **Jon Schopf**, 6'2", 230 pounds, senior, Grand Rapids, MI - started 5 games at right tackle
- David Slezak, 5'11", 185 pounds, junior, Ann Arbor, MI - center
- Jeffrey A. Smith, 6'3", 200 pounds, senior, Kohler, WI - end
- Ron Spacht, 5'10", 180 pounds, senior, Kent, OH - halfback
- **John Stamos**, 6'1", 208 pounds, senior, Chicago - started 7 games at quarterback
- Willard Stawski, 6'3", 215 pounds, junior, Caledonia, MI - tackle
- Jack Strobel, 5'10", 175 pounds, junior, Maywood, IL - halfback
- Richard Szymanski, 5'10", 185 pounds, junior, Toledo, OH - guard
- Bill Tunnicliff, 6'0", 230 pounds, senior, Ferndale, MI - started 1 game at fullback
- Ken Tureaud, 6'0", 194 pounds, senior, Detroit - started 3 games at fullback
- **John Walker**, 6'0", 205 pounds, senior, Walled Lake, MI - started 3 games at center, 1 game at right guard
- James A. Ward, 6'1", 195 pounds, Tr., Imlay City, MI - halfback
- E. James Zubkus, 6'1", 205 pounds, senior, Munhall, PA - end

=== Freshmen ===
- Mel Anthony, 5'11", 190 pounds, Cincinnati - fullback
- Rick Bay, 5'9", 165 pounds, Waukegan, IL - halfback
- Jim Conley, 6'0", 190 pounds, Springdale, PA - end
- John Henderson, 6'3", 195 pounds, Dayton, OH - end
- Richard Rindfuss, 5'10", 176 pounds, Niles, MI - halfback
- Arnie Simkus, 6'3", 230 pounds, Detroit - tackle
- Bob Timberlake, 6'3", 210 pounds, Franklin, OH - quarterback

=== Coaching staff ===
- Head coach: Bump Elliott
- Assistant coaches:

- Don Dufek, Sr. - freshman coach
- Henry Fonde - backfield coach
- Jack Fouts - interior line coach
- Bob Hollway - line coach
- Jack Nelson - end coach

- Trainer: Jim Hunt
- Manager: Richard Asel
