= 1961 Illinois Fighting Illini football team =

American college football season

1961 Illinois Fighting Illini football
- Conference: Big Ten Conference
- Record: 0–9 (0–7 Big Ten)
- Head coach: Pete Elliott (2nd season)
- MVP: Tony Parrilli
- Captain: Gary Brown
- Home stadium: Memorial Stadium

1961 Big Ten Conference football standings
	Conf.					Overall
Team	W		L		T	W		L		T
No. 2 Ohio State $	6	–	0	–	0	8	–	0	–	1
No. 6 Minnesota	6	–	1	–	0	8	–	2	–	0
No. 8 Michigan State	5	–	2	–	0	7	–	2	–	0
No. 12 Purdue	4	–	2	–	0	6	–	3	–	0
Wisconsin	4	–	3	–	0	6	–	3	–	0
Michigan	3	–	3	–	0	6	–	3	–	0
Iowa	2	–	4	–	0	5	–	4	–	0
Northwestern	2	–	4	–	0	4	–	5	–	0
Indiana	0	–	6	–	0	2	–	7	–	0
Illinois	0	–	7	–	0	0	–	9	–	0
$ – Conference champion; Rankings from AP Poll

The 1961 Illinois Fighting Illini football team was an American football team that represented the University of Illinois as a member of the Big Ten Conference during the 1961 Big Ten season. In their second year under head coach Pete Elliott, the Fighting Illini compiled a 0–9 record (0–7 in conference games), finished in last place in the Big Ten, and were outscored by a total of 289 to 53.

Guard and middle linebacker Tony Parrilli was selected as the team's most valuable player and received first-team honors on the 1961 All-Big Ten Conference football team. Gary Brown was the team captain. The team's statistical leaders included senior quarterback Dave McGann (269 passing yards, 55.1% completion percentage), sophomore fullback Al Wheatland (230 rushing yards, 3.2 yards per carry), and senior end Dick Newell (16 receptions for 184 yards). Center Dick Butkus was selected as captain of the freshmen team.

The team played its home games at Memorial Stadium in Champaign, Illinois.

== Schedule ==
Date	Opponent	Site	Result	Attendance	Source
September 30	Washington*	Memorial Stadium; Champaign, IL	L 7–20	41,319	
October 7	Northwestern	Memorial Stadium; Champaign, IL (rivalry)	L 7–28	40,138	
October 14	at No. 7 Ohio State	Ohio Stadium; Columbus, OH (Illibuck)	L 0–44	82,374	
October 21	Minnesota	Memorial Stadium; Champaign, IL	L 0–33	52,247	
October 28	at USC*	Los Angeles Memorial Coliseum; Los Angeles, CA	L 10–14	28,694	
November 4	Purdue	Memorial Stadium; Champaign, IL (rivalry)	L 9–23	35,077	
November 11	Michigan	Memorial Stadium; Champaign, IL (rivalry)	L 6–38	40,179	
November 18	at Wisconsin	Camp Randall Stadium; Madison, WI	L 7–55	45,122	
November 25	at No. 8 Michigan State	Spartan Stadium; East Lansing, MI	L 7–34	38,344	
*Non-conference game; Rankings from AP Poll released prior to the game

== Statistics ==
The 1961 Illini gained an average of only 175.3 yards per game, consisting of 105.0 rushing yards and 70.3 passing yards. On defense, the Illini gave up an average of 364.7 yards per game, including 237.6 rushing yards.

Dave McGann played little until the final two games, but led the Illini in passing, completing 27 of 49 for 269 yards and a .551 completion percentage. The other leading passers were Mel Romani (16-for-47, 174 yards), and Paul Golaszewski (11-for-33, 94 yards).

The rushing leaders were Al Wheatland (230 yards, 73 carries, 3.2-yard average), Ron Fearn (219 yards, 55 carries, 4.0-yard average), and Ken Zimmerman (185 yards, 50 carries, 3.7-yard average).

The receiving leaders were ends Dick Newell (16 receptions, 184 yards) and Gary Hembrough (16 receptions, 170 yards).

Doug Mills handled punting for the Illini, punting 54 times for a 37.1-yard average.

== Awards ==
No Illinois players were named to the 1961 All-America college football team. Senior guard and middle linebacker Tony Parilli was selected by the United Press International as a first-team player, and by the Associated Press (AP) as a second-team player, on the 1961 All-Big Ten Conference football team. Parrilli was also selected by his teammates as the most valuable player on the 1961 Illinois team. Tackle Gary Brown was the 1961 team captain.

== Personnel ==
=== Players ===
The following 38 players received varsity letters for their roles on the 1961 Illinois football team:

- Neal Anderson (#60), guard, sophomore
- Gary Brown (#79), tackle and captain, senior, 228 pounds
- Dick Cast, guard, senior, 219 pounds
- Ken Chalcraft, senior
- Bob Cravens, sophomore
- Dick Deller (#63), guard, sophomore
- Chuck Dickerson, tackle, junior
- Mike Dundy (#41), halfback, sophomore
- Bob Easter, sophomore
- Ron Fearn (#11), quarterback, sophomore
- Todd Gabbett, sophomore
- Glenn Glauser, fullback, junior
- Paul Golaszewski, back, senior
- Denny Gould, fullback and center, senior
- Gary Hembrough (#86), end, senior, 208 pounds
- John Kruze, center, senior
- Frank Lollino, guard, senior
- Tom McCullum (#24), halfback, sophomore, 158 pounds
- Dave McGann, quarterback, senior
- Doug Mills, senior
- Joe Mota, fullback, senior
- Pat Murphy (#75), tackle, 214 pounds
- Dick Newell (#81), end, senior, 173 pounds
- Ron O'Neal, junior
- Jerry Parola, halfback, senior
- Tony Parrilli (#65), guard and middle linebacker, senior
- Bill Pasko, end, sophomore
- Jim Plankenhorn, kicker, junior
- Mel Romani (#10), defensive quarterback, senior, 177 pounds
- Bob Scharbert, tackle, junior
- Mike Summers (#30), halfback/fullback, sophomore
- Steve Thomas, end, senior
- Thurman Walker (#83), end, junior
- Al Wheatland (#46), fullback, sophomore, 197 pounds
- Stan Yukevich (#53), center, senior 219 pounds
- Tony Zeppetella (#64), guard, senior, 208 pounds
- Ken Zimmerman (#20), halfback, junior, 178 pounds
- Cecil Young, halfback, sophomore

=== Coaches ===
- Head coach - Pete Elliott
- Assistant coaches - Bob Herndon (freshman coach), Gene Stauber (defensive backfield coach), Burt Ingwersen, Bill Taylor (ends coach), Buck McPhail (backfield coach), Dee Andros (line coach), Lou Baker, Ralph Fletcher, Bill Tate
