= 1961 Michigan State Spartans football team =

American college football season

1961 Michigan State Spartans football
- Conference: Big Ten Conference

Ranking
- Coaches: No. 9
- AP: No. 8
- Record: 7–2 (5–2 Big Ten)
- Head coach: Duffy Daugherty (8th season)
- MVP: George Saimes
- Captain: Ed Ryan
- Home stadium: Spartan Stadium

1961 Big Ten Conference football standings
	Conf.					Overall
Team	W		L		T	W		L		T
No. 2 Ohio State $	6	–	0	–	0	8	–	0	–	1
No. 6 Minnesota	6	–	1	–	0	8	–	2	–	0
No. 8 Michigan State	5	–	2	–	0	7	–	2	–	0
No. 12 Purdue	4	–	2	–	0	6	–	3	–	0
Wisconsin	4	–	3	–	0	6	–	3	–	0
Michigan	3	–	3	–	0	6	–	3	–	0
Iowa	2	–	4	–	0	5	–	4	–	0
Northwestern	2	–	4	–	0	4	–	5	–	0
Indiana	0	–	6	–	0	2	–	7	–	0
Illinois	0	–	7	–	0	0	–	9	–	0
$ – Conference champion; Rankings from AP Poll

The 1961 Michigan State Spartans football team was an American football team that represented Michigan State University in the 1961 Big Ten Conference football season. In their eighth season under head coach Duffy Daugherty, the Spartans compiled a 7–2 record (5–2 in conference games), finished in third place in the Big Ten Conference, and were ranked No. 8 in the final AP poll. They outscored opponents by a total of 192 to 50.

The team tallied an average of 237.2 passing yards, 83.3 passing yards, and 21.3 points per game. On defense, they gave up an average of 116.1 rushing yards, 78.4 passing yards, and 5.6 points per game.

The Spartans defeated rivals Michigan (28–0), Notre Dame (17–7), and Indiana (35–0), and were ranked No. 1 in the AP poll in early November. They then lost consecutive games on the road to Minnesota (0–13) and Purdue (6–7), dropping from No. 1 to No. 9.

Fullback George Saimes led the team in both rushing (451 yards, 5.5 yards per carry) and scoring (48 points) and was selected as the team's most valuable player.

== Schedule ==
Date	Opponent	Rank	Site	Result	Attendance	Source
September 30	at Wisconsin	No. 10	Camp Randall Stadium; Madison, WI	W 20–0	50,584	
October 7	Stanford*	No. 6	Spartan Stadium; East Lansing, MI	W 31–3	61,367	
October 14	at No. 6 Michigan	No. 5	Michigan Stadium; Ann Arbor, MI (rivalry)	W 28–0	103,198	
October 21	No. 6 Notre Dame*	No. 1	Spartan Stadium; East Lansing, MI (rivalry)	W 17–7	76,132	
October 28	Indiana^{†}	No. 1	Spartan Stadium; East Lansing, MI (rivalry)	W 35–0	55,361	
November 4	at Minnesota	No. 1	Memorial Stadium; Minneapolis, MN	L 0–13	59,941	
November 11	at Purdue	No. 6	Ross–Ade Stadium; West Lafayette, IN	L 6–7	45,638	
November 18	Northwestern	No. 9	Spartan Stadium; East Lansing, MI	W 21–13	51,403	
November 25	Illinois	No. 8	Spartan Stadium; East Lansing, MI	W 34–7	38,344	
*Non-conference game; ^{†}Homecoming; Rankings from AP Poll released prior to the game

== Award winners ==
Junior fullback George Saimes was selected as the team's most valuable player. He won first-team honors from the Associated Press (AP) and United Press International (UPI) on the 1961 All-Big Ten Conference football team. Other notable players on the 1961 team included:

Tackle Dave Behrman was selected by the AP and Football Writers Association of America (FWAA) on the 1961 All-America team.

Sophomore halfback Sherman Lewis received second-team all-conference honors from the AP.

Guard Ed Budde received third-team all-conference honors from the AP.

== Statistical leaders ==
Quarterback Pete Smith led the team in passing, completing 42 of 94 passes for 630 yards with five touchdown passes and seven interceptions.

George Saimes led the team with 451 rushing yards on 82 carries for an average of 5.5 yards per carry. He also led the team in scoring with 48 yards on eight rushing touchdowns.

Lonnie Sanders led the team in receiving with 15 catches for 247 yards.

Sherman Lewis ranked second on the team in both rushing (399 yards) and scoring (30 points).

== Varsity letters ==
A total of 42 players received varsity letters for their participation on the 1961 Michigan State team. Players who went on to play professional football are marked with an asterisk.

- George Azar
- Gary Ballman*, halfback and wide receiver
- Dave Behrman*, center and tackle
- James Bobbitt
- Arthur Bandstatter
- Charles Brown
- Ed Budde*, guard
- Carl Charon*, defensive back and fullback
- Ernie Clark*, linebacker
- James Corgiat
- Michael Currie
- Wayne Fontes*, defensive back
- Ron Hatcher*, fullback
- Dave Herman*, guard
- Larry Hudas
- Herman Johnston
- Thomas Jordan
- Peter Kakela
- Jim Kanicki*, defensive tackle
- Anthony Kumiega
- Earl Latimer
- Sherman Lewis*, halfback
- Dewey Lincoln
- Roger Lopes
- Dave Manders*, centr
- Stephen Mellinger
- Mitchell Newman
- Roy Parrott
- Richard Proebstle
- Ronald Rubick
- Edward Ryan
- George Saimes*, fullback
- Lonnie Sanders*, cornerback
- John Sharp
- Peter Smith
- Matt Snorton*, tight end
- Donald Stewart
- Bob Suci*, defensive back
- Robert Swast
- Dan Underwood
- Thomas Winiecki
- Edward Youngs
