= 1961 Minnesota Golden Gophers football team =

American college football season

1961 Minnesota Golden Gophers football

Rose Bowl champion

Rose Bowl, W 21–3 vs. UCLA
- Conference: Big Ten Conference

Ranking
- Coaches: No. 6
- AP: No. 6
- Record: 8–2 (6–1 Big Ten)
- Head coach: Murray Warmath (8th season)
- MVP: Sandy Stephens
- Captain: John Mulvena
- Home stadium: Memorial Stadium

1961 Big Ten Conference football standings
	Conf.					Overall
Team	W		L		T	W		L		T
No. 2 Ohio State $	6	–	0	–	0	8	–	0	–	1
No. 6 Minnesota	6	–	1	–	0	8	–	2	–	0
No. 8 Michigan State	5	–	2	–	0	7	–	2	–	0
No. 12 Purdue	4	–	2	–	0	6	–	3	–	0
Wisconsin	4	–	3	–	0	6	–	3	–	0
Michigan	3	–	3	–	0	6	–	3	–	0
Iowa	2	–	4	–	0	5	–	4	–	0
Northwestern	2	–	4	–	0	4	–	5	–	0
Indiana	0	–	6	–	0	2	–	7	–	0
Illinois	0	–	7	–	0	0	–	9	–	0
$ – Conference champion; Rankings from AP Poll

The 1961 Minnesota Golden Gophers football team was an American football team that represented the University of Minnesota in the 1961 Big Ten Conference football season. In their eighth year under head coach Murray Warmath, the Golden Gophers compiled an 8–2 record (6–1 in conference games), outscored opponents by a total of 140 to 75, and were ranked No. 6 in the final AP and UPI polls. They defeated UCLA, 21–3, in the 1962 Rose Bowl.

The team averaged 176.7 rushing yards, 88.2 passing yards, and 14 points per game. On defense, the team gave up an average of 84.3 rushing yards, 115.4 passing yards, and 7.5 points per game.

Quarterback Sandy Stephens led the team in passing, rushing, and scoring. He was a consensus first-team All-American, finished fourth in the Heisman Trophy voting, and received the Chicago Tribune Silver Football award as the Big Ten's most valuable player. Tackle Bobby Bell was also named a first-team All-American.

The team played its home games at Memorial Stadium in Minneapolis. Total attendance at six home games was 366,491, an average of 61,081, and the season high was against Purdue on November 18.

== Schedule ==
Date	Opponent	Rank	Site	Result	Attendance	Source
September 30	Missouri*		Memorial Stadium; Minneapolis, MN	L 0–6	58,840	
October 7	Oregon*		Memorial Stadium; Minneapolis, MN	W 14–7	50,499	
October 14	at Northwestern		Dyche Stadium; Evanston, IL	W 10–3	41,251	
October 21	at Illinois		Memorial Stadium; Champaign, IL	W 33–0	52,247	
October 28	Michigan^{†}		Memorial Stadium; Minneapolis, MN (Little Brown Jug)	W 23–20	63,898	
November 4	No. 1 Michigan State		Memorial Stadium; Minneapolis, MN	W 13–0	59,941	
November 11	at Iowa	No. 5	Iowa Stadium; Iowa City, IA (rivalry)	W 16–9	60,100	
November 18	No. 7 Purdue	No. 5	Memorial Stadium; Minneapolis, MN	W 10–7	67,081	
November 25	Wisconsin	No. 3	Memorial Stadium; Minneapolis, MN (rivalry)	L 21–23	66,232	
January 1	vs. No. 16 UCLA*	No. 6	Rose Bowl; Pasadena, CA (Rose Bowl)	W 21–3	98,214	
*Non-conference game; ^{†}Homecoming; Rankings from AP Poll released prior to the game

== Awards ==
Quarterback Sandy Stephens won the Chicago Tribune Silver Football award as the most valuable player in the Big Ten. He also finished fourth in voting for the 1961 Heisman Trophy.

Two Minnesota players received first-team honors on the 1961 All-America team. Stephens was a first-team pick by the Associated Press (AP), United Press International (UPI), Football Writers Association of America (FWAA), Sporting News, and the Walter Camp Football Foundation. Tackle Bobby Bell was a first-team pick by the American Football Coaches Association, FWAA, Sporting News, and Central Press Association.

The following Minnesota players were recognized on the 1961 All-Big Ten Conference football team: quarterback Sandy Stephens (AP-1, UPI-1); tackle Bobby Bell (AP-1, UPI-1); end Tom Hall (AP-2, UPI-1); halfback Bill Munsey (AP-3, UPI-2); and guard Robin Tellor (AP-3, UPI-3).

== Statistical leaders ==
Quarterback Sandy Stephens led the team in multiple statistical categories, including passing (47 of 142 for 794 yards with nine touchdown passes and 13 interceptions); rushing (487 yards on 110 attempts); and scoring 48 points (eight touchdowns).

The team's rusing leaders after Stephens were Judge Dickson (275 yards), Bill Munsey (211 yards), Dave Mulholland (176 yards), Jim Cairns (171 yards), and Jerry Jones (167 yards).

The team's receiving leaders were Tom Hall with nine receptions for 197 yards; Jim Cairns with eight receptions for 156 yards; John Campbell with three receptions for 117 yards; and Bob Deegan with five receptions for 72 yards.

== Roster ==
- Bobby Bell*, tackle, 6'4", 220 pounds
- Paul Benson, halfback, 6'1", 186 pounds
- Duane Blaska, quarterback, 5'11", 184 pounds
- Terry Brown, halfback, 5'11", 178 pounds
- Jim Cairns, halfbacks, 6'0", 185 pounds
- John Campbell, end, 6'3", 204 pounds
- Timothy Cashman
- Bob Deegan, end, 6'2-1/2", 205 pounds
- Duane Dickson, fullback, 6'2", 210 pounds
- Carl Eller*, tackle, 6'5", 226 pounds
- Dick Enga, center, 6'0", 190 pounds
- Al Fischer, halfbacks, 5'9", 164 pounds
- Bob Frisbee, center, 6'3", 230 pounds
- Tom Hall, end, 6'1-1/2", 195 pounds
- Terry Hedstrom, fullback, 5'10", 201 pounds
- Julian J. Hook, center, 5'9-1/2", 183 pounds
- Jerry Jones, fullback, 5'11", 195 pounds
- Steve Kereakos, tackle, 5'11-1/2", 222 pounds
- Tom King
- Tom Loechler, tackle, 6'2", 230 pounds
- David Lothner, end, 6'2", 195 pounds
- Dave Mulholland, halfbacks, 6'0", 190 pounds
- John Mulvena, guard and captain, 6'1", 206-1/2 pounds
- Roland Mudd, guard, 6'1", 205 pounds
- Bill Munsey*, halfback, 5'11", 196 pounds
- Jerry Pelletier, quarterback, 5'8", 150 pounds
- Jack Perkovich, guard, 6'1-1/2", 195 pounds
- Bob Prawdzik, end, 6'2", 203 pounds
- Ted Rude, end, 6'2", 210 pounds
- Bob Sadek, quarterback, 6'2", 185 pounds
- Charlie Smith, halfbacks, 6'1", 186 pounds
- Sandy Stephens, quarterback, 6'0", 215 pounds
- Robin Tellor, guard, 6'0", 216 pounds
- Jim Wheeler, tackle, 6'2", 206 pounds
