= 1961 Indiana Hoosiers football team =

American college football season

1961 Indiana Hoosiers football
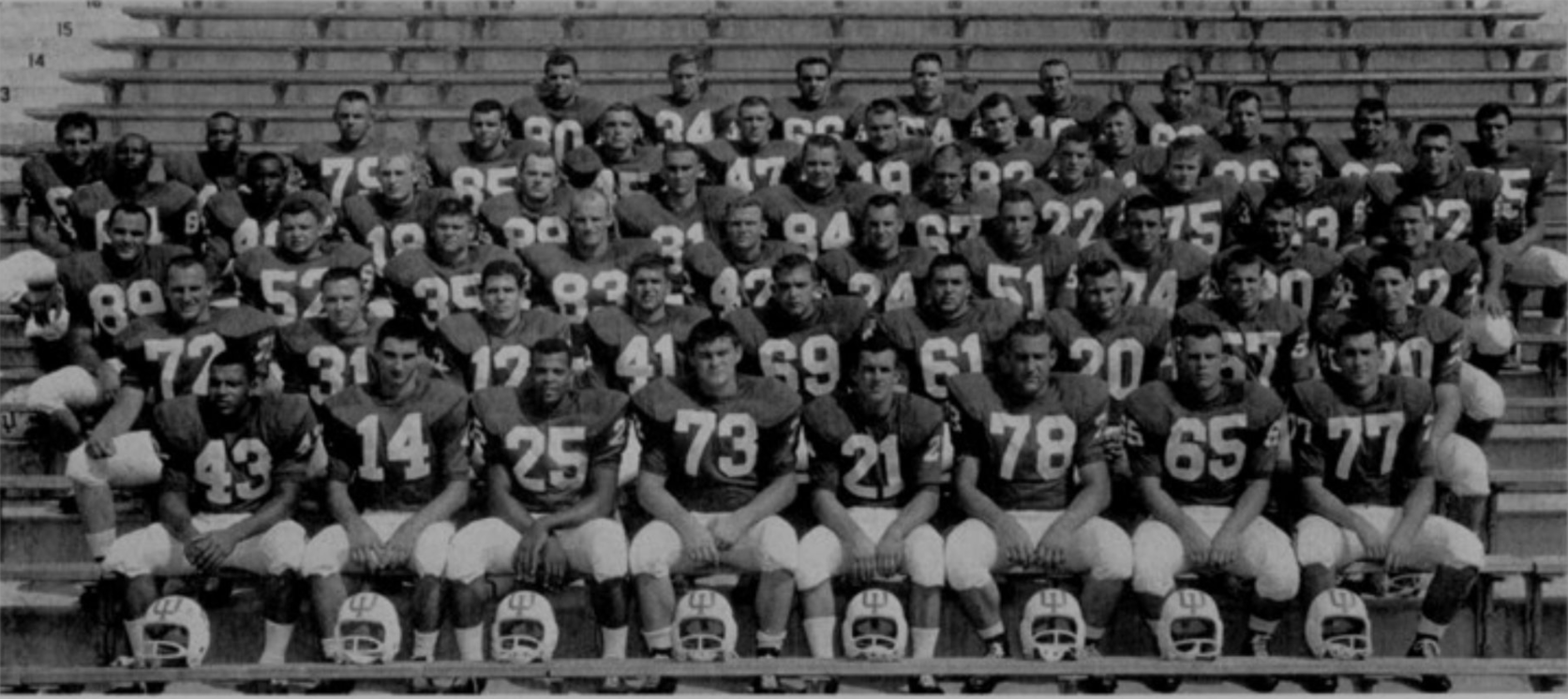
- Conference: Big Ten Conference
- Record: 2–7 (0–6 Big Ten)
- Head coach: Phil Dickens (4th season)
- MVP: Byron Broome
- Captain: Bill Olsavsky
- Home stadium: Seventeenth Street Stadium

1961 Big Ten Conference football standings
	Conf.					Overall
Team	W		L		T	W		L		T
No. 2 Ohio State $	6	–	0	–	0	8	–	0	–	1
No. 6 Minnesota	6	–	1	–	0	8	–	2	–	0
No. 8 Michigan State	5	–	2	–	0	7	–	2	–	0
No. 12 Purdue	4	–	2	–	0	6	–	3	–	0
Wisconsin	4	–	3	–	0	6	–	3	–	0
Michigan	3	–	3	–	0	6	–	3	–	0
Iowa	2	–	4	–	0	5	–	4	–	0
Northwestern	2	–	4	–	0	4	–	5	–	0
Indiana	0	–	6	–	0	2	–	7	–	0
Illinois	0	–	7	–	0	0	–	9	–	0
$ – Conference champion; Rankings from AP Poll

The 1961 Indiana Hoosiers football team was an American football team that represented Indiana University in the 1961 Big Ten Conference football season. In their fourth year under head coach Phil Dickens, the Hoosiers compiled a 2–7 record (0–6 in conference games), finished in a tie for last place in the Big Ten Conference, and were outscored by a total of 162 to 96.

The Hoosiers were led on offense by Byron Broome who played fullback in 1959, tailback in 1960, and quarterback in 1961. He tallied 627 passing yards at his new position and was selected as the team's most valuable player. Indiana's other leaders included fullback Marv Woodson (425 rushing yards) and end Bill Olsavsky (237 receiving yards). Woodson was selected by the Associated Press as a second-team player on the 1961 All-Big Ten Conference football team.

The Hoosiers played their home games at Seventeenth Street Stadium in Bloomington, Indiana.

== Schedule ==
Date	Opponent	Site	Result	Attendance	Source
September 23	at Kansas State*	Memorial Stadium; Manhattan, KS	L 8–14	7,800	
October 7	Wisconsin	Seventeenth Street Stadium; Bloomington, IN	L 3–6	23,270	
October 14	at No. 2 Iowa	Iowa Stadium; Iowa City, IA	L 8–27	56,000	
October 21	Washington State*	Seventeenth Street Stadium; Bloomington, IN	W 33–7	23,307	
October 28	at No. 1 Michigan State	Spartan Stadium; East Lansing, MI (rivalry)	L 0–35	55,361	
November 4	at Northwestern	Dyche Stadium; Evanston, IL	L 8–14	35,392	
November 11	No. 3 Ohio State^{†}	Seventeenth Street Stadium; Bloomington, IN	L 7–16	27,108	
November 18	at West Virginia*	Mountaineer Field; Morgantown, WV	W 17–9	15,000	
November 25	Purdue	Seventeenth Street Stadium; Bloomington, IN (Old Oaken Bucket)	L 12–34	34,798–36,000	
*Non-conference game; ^{†}Homecoming; Rankings from AP Poll released prior to the game

== Players ==
- Jim Bailey (#10), fullback, junior, 6'0", 185 pounds
- Byron Broome (#20), quarterback, senior, 5'10", 175 pounds
- Don Cromer (#32), fullback, senior, 6'0", 190 pounds
- Ken Ellis, guard, junior, 6'3", 208 pounds
- Jack Holder, center, junior, 5'10", 190 pounds
- Bill Olsavsky, tackle, senior, 6'1", 190 pounds
- Gregg Orth, tackle, senior, 6'5", 205 pounds
- Ralph Poehls, tackle, junior, 6'1", 210 pounds
- Bill Quinter, end, senior, 6'1", 200 pounds
- Nate Ramsey, halfback, junior, 6'0", 180 pounds
- Bob Vecchio, guard, senior, 5'11", 195 pounds
- Marv Woodson, halfback, sophomore, 6'0", 182 pounds
