= Pat Russ =

American football player (1940–1984)

No. 75, 71
- Position: Defensive tackle

Personal information
- Born: January 8, 1940; Cambridge, Massachusetts, U.S.
- Died: February 4, 1984 (aged 44); Cincinnati, Ohio, U.S.
- Listed height: 6 ft 3 in (1.91 m)
- Listed weight: 255 lb (116 kg)

Career information
- High school: Roger Bacon (OH)
- College: Purdue
- NFL draft: 1962: 14th round, 185th overall pick
- AFL draft: 1962: 16th round, 121st overall pick

Career history
- Minnesota Vikings (1963); Oakland Raiders (1965)*; Hartford Charter Oaks (1965–1966)
- * Offseason or practice squad member only

Career NFL statistics
- Sacks: 1.5
- Stats at Pro Football Reference

Patrick Joseph Russ (January 8, 1940 – February 4, 1984) was an American professional football player who was a defensive tackle for the Minnesota Vikings of the National Football League (NFL). He played college football for the Purdue Boilermakers.

== Early life ==
A native of Cincinnati, Russ attended Roger Bacon High School and then played college football at Purdue University from 1959 to 1961. He and Larry Bowie anchored the defensive line on the 1961 Boilermakers team that was ranked No. 11 in the final UPI poll and led the Big Ten Conference in rushing defense, giving up an average of only 121 yards per game.

== Professional career ==
He was selected by the Minnesota Vikings in the 14th round (185th overall pick) of the 1962 NFL draft. He impressed the Vikings' coaching staff during the 1962 pre-season but was placed on waivers prior to the start of the regular season and spent the 1962 on the club's taxi squad. He played for the Vikings during the 1963 season, appearing in a total of 14 NFL games. He was with the Vikings during the 1964 pre-season but was cut in early September as part of the final roster cuts.

He joined the Oakland Raiders of the American Football League in 1965 but was cut before the start of the regular season. He then played for the Hartford Charter Oaks of the Continental Football League (CoFL) during the 1965 and 1966 seasons.

== Death ==
Russ died on February 4, 1984, in Cincinnati, at the age of 44.
