= 1962 Rose Bowl =

American college football game

- 48th Rose Bowl Game
Minnesota Golden Gophers	UCLA Bruins
(7–2)	(7–3)
21	3
Head coach: Murray Warmath	Head coach: Bill Barnes
AP / Coaches; 6 / 6	AP / Coaches; 16 / NR
	1	2	3	4	Total
Minnesota	7	7	0	7	21
UCLA	3	0	0	0	3
- Date: January 1, 1962
- Season: 1961
- Stadium: Rose Bowl
- Location: Pasadena, California
- MVP: Sandy Stephens; QB - Minnesota
- Favorite: Minnesota by 8
- National anthem: UCLA Band
- Referee: R.E. Meyer (Big Ten) (split crew: Big Ten, AAWU)
- Halftime show: UCLA Band, University of Minnesota Marching Band
- Attendance: 98,214

United States TV coverage
- Network: NBC (first color broadcast)
- Announcers: Mel Allen, Braven Dyer
- Nielsen ratings: 31.0

The 1962 Rose Bowl, played on January 1, 1962, was the 48th Rose Bowl Game. The Minnesota Golden Gophers defeated the UCLA Bruins, 21–3.

Big Ten Conference champion Ohio State declined the invitation to play in the Rose Bowl. Days after the conclusion of the regular season, the university's faculty council voted 28–25 against participation in the Rose Bowl. They were under no contractual obligation to accept the invitation following the demise of the Pacific Coast Conference after the 1958 season. Minnesota, the runner-up in the Big Ten, was then offered the "at-large" invitation, and accepted.

Minnesota quarterback Sandy Stephens was named the Rose Bowl Player Of The Game. It was broadcast on the NBC television network and was the first national color television broadcast of a college football game.

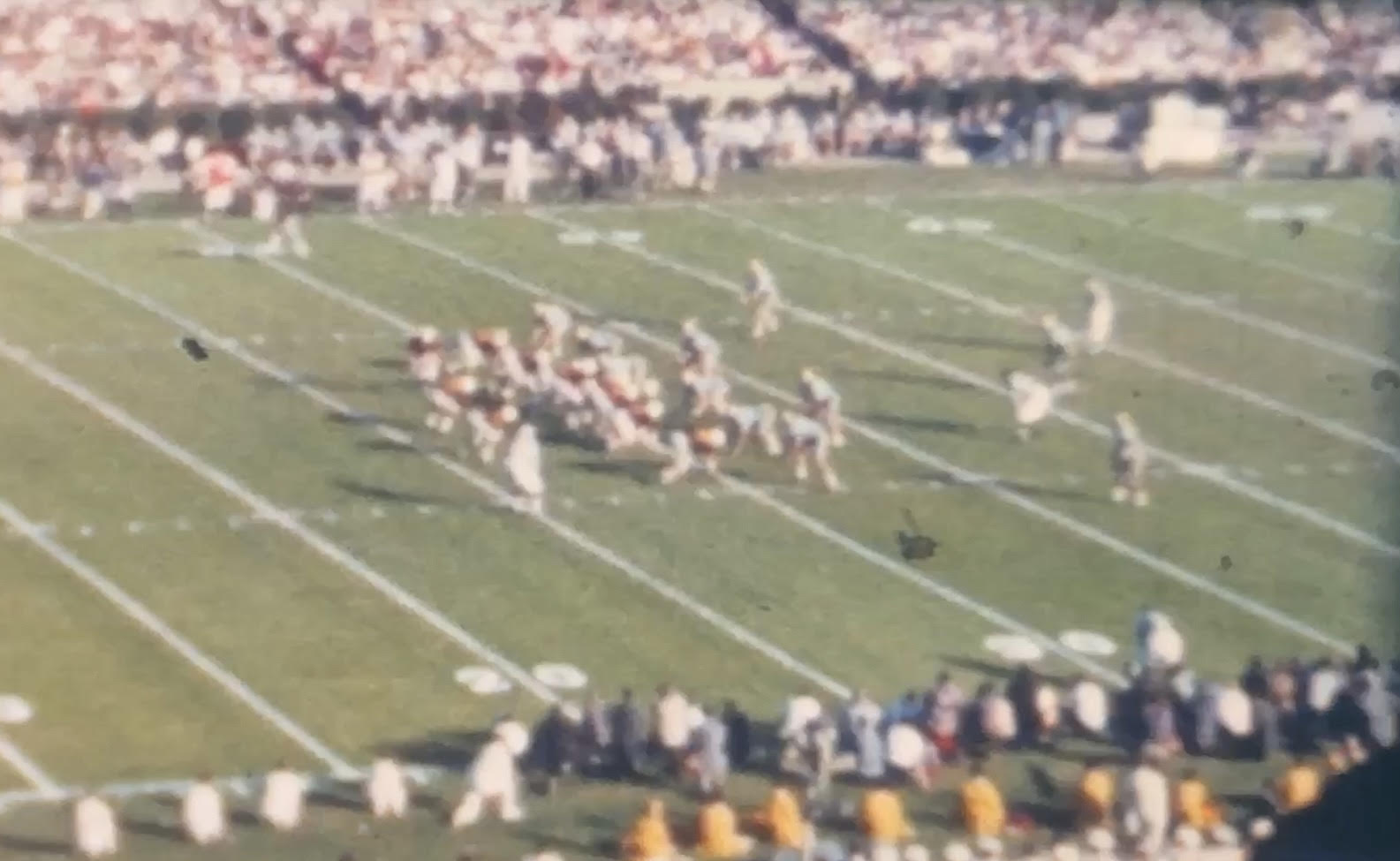
The 1962 Rose Bowl

== Teams ==
=== University of Minnesota Golden Gophers ===
The Gophers had gone to the Rose Bowl the previous year as the #1 team in the nation and lost to the Washington Huskies. In 1961, the Gophers actually finished in second place in Big Ten Conference play. Minnesota had a loss to Missouri, and a Big Ten loss to Wisconsin in their rivalry game. Ohio State was the Big Ten champion, but because of a faculty council decision to emphasize academics over athletics, the Buckeyes turned down the Rose Bowl berth. Ironically, Minnesota would not have received the Rose Bowl invitation if they had, in fact, been the 1961 Big Ten champion and the conference had a formal agreement with the Rose Bowl for the 1961 and 1962 games, since the Big Ten had a "no-repeat" rule in effect until 1972. The Gophers were led by Sandy Stephens, the first African American All-American quarterback. However, he was not the first African-American starting quarterback in a Rose Bowl (this distinction goes to Charles Fremont West of Washington & Jefferson, forty years earlier in 1922).

=== UCLA Bruins ===
In the regular season, UCLA had lost at both Michigan and Ohio State earlier in the season. They also lost to Washington, but managed to beat USC during one of the few rainy games in the rivalry.

== Game summary ==
The weather was sunny, and Minnesota wore their home maroon jerseys, with white helmets and white pants, while UCLA also wore their home powder blue uniforms with gold pants. Using the single wing offense, UCLA struggled against the Gophers, netting only one field goal to open the scoring in the first quarter. Minnesota had 21 first downs to UCLA's 8, and the Gophers held the Bruins to 107 total yards, while gaining 297 yards on 66 plays. Stephens rushed for 46 yards on 12 carries, including two rushing touchdowns, and was 7 for 11 in passing for 75 yards.

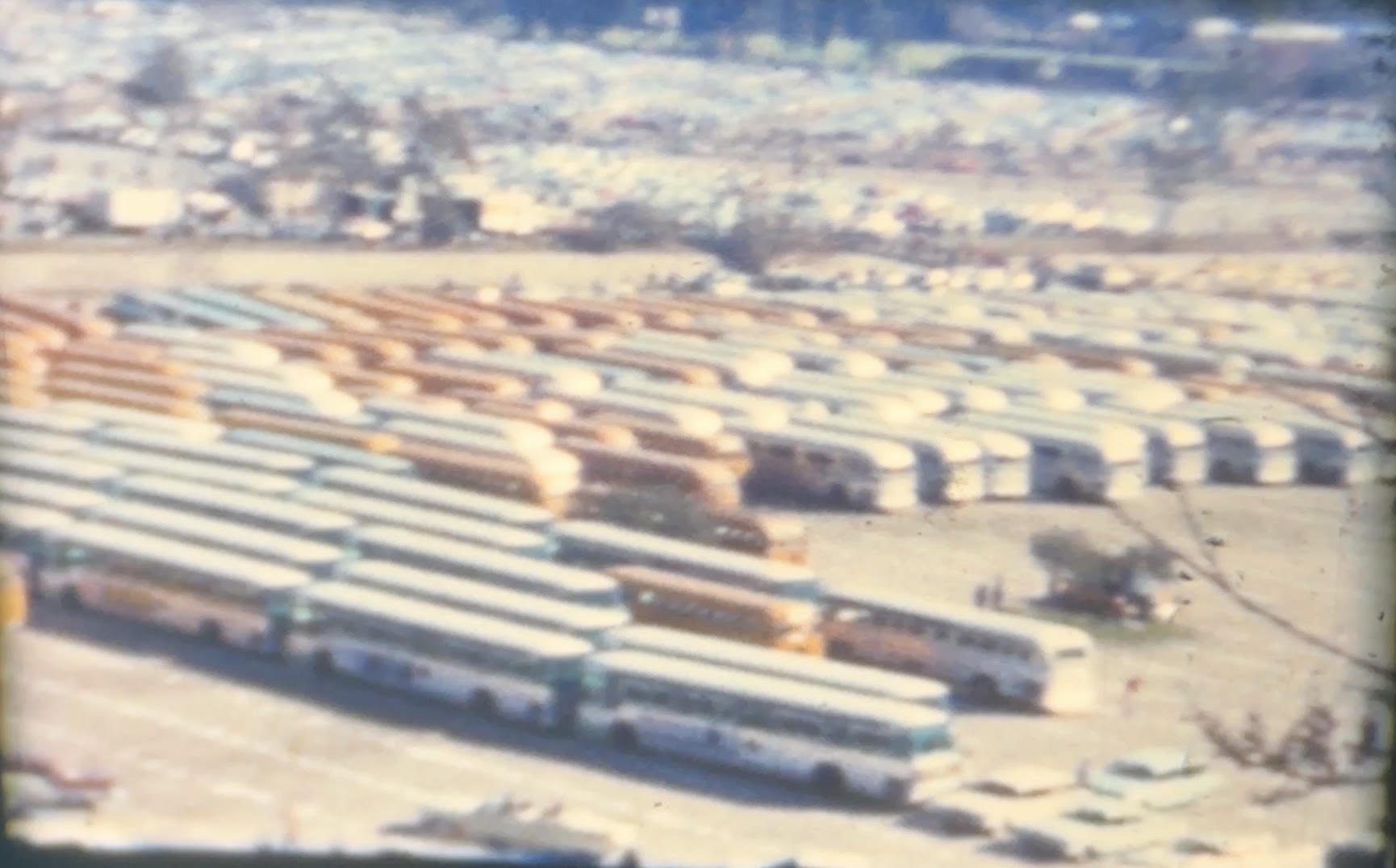
Large number of busses delivering staff, players, students, and fans for the 1962 Rose Bowl

=== Scoring ===
==== First quarter ====
- UCLA — Bobby Smith kicks 28-yard field goal. UCLA 3–0
- Minnesota — Sandy Stephens dives over from one-yard line. Tom Loechler kick. MINN 7–3

==== Second quarter ====
- Minnesota — Bill Munsey goes over from three-yard line. Loechler kick. MINN 14–3

==== Third quarter ====
- No scoring

==== Fourth quarter ====
- Minnesota — Stephens runs over from two-yard line. Loechler kick. MINN 21–3

=== Statistics ===
Team stats	Minn.	UCLA
First downs	21	8
Net Yards Rushing	222	55
Net Yards Passing	75	52
Total Yards	297	107
PC–PA–Int.	7–11–0	5–8–0
Punts–Avg.	3–40.7	5–37.2
Fumbles–Lost	3–2	2–2
Penalties–Yards	6–70	1–5

== Aftermath ==
This is Minnesota's only Rose Bowl win and its most recent appearance. Through the 2019 season, Minnesota has gone the longest in the Big Ten conference without playing in the Rose Bowl game. Sandy Stephens was named the Most Valuable player, and became the first African American to get the award.

Both head coaches in the game were University of Tennessee graduates who had played under legendary coach Robert Neyland.

== Game facts ==
All-American defensive tackle Bobby Bell played in both the 1961 and 1962 Rose Bowls for the Gophers. He later played in two Super Bowls with the Kansas City Chiefs, I and IV, winning the latter in January 1970.
