= Bruce McLenna =

American football player (1941–1968)

- Born: December 23, 1941; Holly, Michigan, U.S.
- Died: June 18, 1968 (aged 26); Urbana, Missouri, U.S.
- Military career
- Allegiance: United States of America
- Branch: Missouri National Guard
- Service years: 1967–1968
- Unit: 1975th Military Police Battalion
- Other work: Football career

No. 24
- Positions: Halfback, Fullback, End

Personal information
- Listed height: 6 ft 3 in (1.91 m)
- Listed weight: 225 lb (102 kg)

Career information
- College: Michigan
- NFL draft: 1965: 9th round, 123rd overall pick
- AFL draft: 1965: Red Shirt 9th round, 69th overall pick

Career history
- Detroit Lions (1966); New Orleans Saints (1967)*; Kansas City Chiefs (1967–1968)*
- * Offseason or practice squad member only

Career NFL statistics
- Carries: 16
- Rushing yards: 51
- Average: 3.1
- Receptions: 3
- Yards: 13
- Touchdowns: 0
- Stats at Pro Football Reference

Bruce Oliver McLenna (December 23, 1941 – June 18, 1968) was an American professional football player. He played college football for the University of Michigan in 1961 and for Hillsdale College in 1964 and 1965. He played in the National Football League (NFL) for the Detroit Lions in 1966 and was later signed by the Kansas City Chiefs. In June 1968, he was killed in an automobile accident at age 26 while riding in a military vehicle as part of his service in the Missouri National Guard.

== Early life ==
A native of Holly, Michigan, McLenna grew up in Fenton, Michigan.

== College career ==
McLenna played college football as a halfback for the University of Michigan in 1961. He gained 43 net rushing yards on 14 rushing attempts in 1961 and scored touchdowns against Army and Ohio State. He was listed on the 1962 roster at the fullback and end positions, but he was ruled academically ineligible to play for Michigan's football team in late August 1962.

McLenna transferred to Hillsdale College where he became a star running back for the Hillsdale Chargers football team. He played for Hillsdale in 1964 and 1965 and was the leading scorer in the state in 1964. He was also selected as Hillsdale's most valuable player in 1965. He was also selected for the "Little All-America" team.

== Professional career ==
McLenna was drafted by the Detroit Lions in the ninth round (123rd overall pick) of the 1965 NFL draft, but he opted to continue playing for Hillsdale College in 1965. He played at the halfback position for the 1966 Detroit Lions, appearing in the first nine games of the 1966 NFL season. However, he sustained a knee injury in the ninth game and missed the remainder of the season. McLenna underwent knee surgery in November 1966. In March 1967, the Lions traded McLenna to the New Orleans Saints for Charlie Bradshaw. He was cut by the Saints before the start of the 1967 regular season. He then signed with the Kansas City Chiefs and played on the Chiefs' practice squad during the 1967 season.

== Death ==
McLenna died in June 1968 at Urbana, Missouri. He was killed in an automobile crash while traveling in a military vehicle from Ft. Leonard Wood to Camp Clark at Nevada, Missouri. According to an account of the accident published in The Sporting News, McLenna was riding in the rear of a military truck as part of a two-week assignment with the 1975th Military Police Battalion. The truck was sideswiped by a civilian automobile on U.S. Highway 65. McLenna was attempting to fulfill his service obligation with the Missouri National Guard before the start of the 1968 AFL season.

== See also ==
- List of gridiron football players who died during their careers
