= 1961 Wisconsin Badgers football team =

American college football season

1961 Wisconsin Badgers football
- Conference: Big Ten Conference

Ranking
- Coaches: No. 18
- Record: 6–3 (4–3 Big Ten)
- Head coach: Milt Bruhn (6th season)
- MVP: Ron Miller
- Captains: Jim Bakken; Don Schade
- Home stadium: Camp Randall Stadium

1961 Big Ten Conference football standings
	Conf.					Overall
Team	W		L		T	W		L		T
No. 2 Ohio State $	6	–	0	–	0	8	–	0	–	1
No. 6 Minnesota	6	–	1	–	0	8	–	2	–	0
No. 8 Michigan State	5	–	2	–	0	7	–	2	–	0
No. 12 Purdue	4	–	2	–	0	6	–	3	–	0
Wisconsin	4	–	3	–	0	6	–	3	–	0
Michigan	3	–	3	–	0	6	–	3	–	0
Iowa	2	–	4	–	0	5	–	4	–	0
Northwestern	2	–	4	–	0	4	–	5	–	0
Indiana	0	–	6	–	0	2	–	7	–	0
Illinois	0	–	7	–	0	0	–	9	–	0
$ – Conference champion; Rankings from AP Poll

The 1961 Wisconsin Badgers football team was an American football team that represented the University of Wisconsin in the 1961 Big Ten Conference football season. In their sixth year under head coach Milt Bruhn, the Badgers compiled a 6–3 record (4–3 in conference games), finished fifth in the Big Ten, and outscored opponents by a total of 179 to 158. They were ranked No. 18 in the final UPI coaches poll.

Quarterback Ron Miller led the country with 1,487 passing yards, won the Sammy Baugh Trophy as the best passer in college football, and was selected as Wisconsin's most valuable player. End Pat Richter was the team's only first-team All-American and led the country with 817 receiving yards.

The team played its home games at Camp Randall Stadium in Madison, Wisconsin.

== Schedule ==
Date	Opponent	Site	Result	Attendance	Source
September 23	Utah*	Camp Randall Stadium; Madison, WI	W 7–0	36,325	
September 30	No. 10 Michigan State	Camp Randall Stadium; Madison, WI	L 0–20	50,584	
October 7	at Indiana	Memorial Stadium; Bloomington, IN	W 6–3	23,270	
October 14	Oregon State*	Camp Randall Stadium; Madison, WI	W 23–20	45,274	
October 21	at No. 4 Iowa	Iowa Stadium; Iowa City, IA (rivalry)	L 15–47	60,150	
October 28	No. 6 Ohio State^{†}	Camp Randall Stadium; Madison, WI	L 21–30	58,411	
November 11	at Northwestern	Dyche Stadium; Evanston, IL	W 29–10	46,203	
November 18	Illinois	Camp Randall Stadium; Madison, WI	W 55–7	45,122	
November 25	at No. 3 Minnesota	Memorial Stadium; Minneapolis, MN (rivalry)	W 23–21	66,232	
*Non-conference game; ^{†}Homecoming; Rankings from AP Poll released prior to the game

== Statistics ==
The 1961 Wisconsin team tallied 2,749 yards of total offense, consisting of 1,696 passing yards and 1,053 rushing yards. On defense, the Badgers gave up 2,822 yards -- 877 passing yards and 1,945 rushing yards.

Quarterback Ron Miller led the country and set a Wisconsin record with 1,487 passing yards. He completed 104 of 198 passes (52.5%) and threw 11 touchdowns and 11 interceptions for a quarterback rating of 122.8. In the Badgers' victory over Minnesota, Miller broke Wisconsin's single-game record with 297 passing yards.

End Pat Richter led the country with 817 receiving yards. He set Wisconsin single-season records for both receptions (47) and receiving yardage (817). He also broke the school's single-game record with 170 receiving yards against Illinois. Richter also led the team in scoring with 48 points on eight touchdowns.

Wisconsin's other receiving leaders included Ron Staley (18 receptions, 234 yards), Louie Holland (nine receptions, 119 yards), and Nap Hearn (nine receptions, 117 yards).

The team's leading rushers were Jim Nettles (213 yards, 39 carries, 5.4-yard average), Louie Holland (177 yards, 62 carries, 2.8-yard average), Bill Smith (153 yards, 43 carries, 3.5-yard average), Neil Fleming (142 yards, 43 carries, 3.3-yard average), and Gerald McKinney (123 yards, 29 carries, 4.2 -yard average).

Jim Bakken handed punting and place-kicking for the Badgers. He led the Big Ten with an average of 41.2 yards per punt in Big Ten games. He had an 89-yard punt against Northwestern that was the longest of the Big Ten season. He also set a modern Big Ten record with a 47-yard field goal against Northwestern.

== Awards ==
Quarterback Ron Miller won the Sammy Baugh Trophy as the nation's outstanding passer. Miller was also selected as Wisconsin's most valuable player for 1961.

End Pat Richter was the only Wisconsin player to receive All-America honors in 1961. He was selected by the United Press International (UPI) as a first-team end on its 1961 All-America college football team. He was placed on the second team by the Associated Press (AP). Richter was also chosen by both the AP and UPI as a first-team end on the 1961 All-Big Ten Conference football team.

== Professional football draft ==
The following players from the 1961 Wisconsin team were selected in the professional football drafts:

1961 draft

- Ron Miller, quarterback, selected by the Los Angeles Rams in the third round (41st overall pick) of the 1961 NFL draft

1962 draft

- Jim Bakken, kicker, selected by the Los Angeles Rams in the seventh round (88 overall pick) of the 1962 NFL draft
- Ron Staley, end, selected by the Minnesota Vikings in the 17th round (226th overall pick) of the 1962 NFL draft

1963 draft

- Pat Richter, end, selected by the Washington Redskins in the first round (seventh overall pick) of the 1963 NFL draft and by the Denver Broncos in the 10th round (78th overall pick) of the 1963 AFL draft
- Gary Kroner, back, selected by the Green Bay Packers in the seventh round (93rd overall pick) of the 1963 NFL draft

1964 draft

- Roger Pillath, tackle, selected by the Los Angeles Rams in the third round (39th overall pick) of the 1964 NFL draft
- Ken Bowman, center, selected by the Green Bay Packers in the eighth round (111th pick) of the 1964 NFL draft
