= Chuck Bryant (American football) =

American football player (1940–)

No. 87
- Position: End

Personal information
- Born: September 12, 1940; Zanesville, Ohio, U.S.
- Died: October 12, 2020 (aged 80); Newark, Ohio, U.S.
- Listed height: 6 ft 2 in (1.88 m)
- Listed weight: 220 lb (100 kg)

Career information
- High school: Zanesville
- College: Ohio State (1958–1961)
- NFL draft: 1962: 3rd round, 34th overall pick

Career history
- St. Louis Cardinals (1962)

Awards and highlights
- FWAA national champion (1961)
- Stats at Pro Football Reference

Charles S. Bryant (September 12, 1940 – October 12, 2020) was an American professional football end who played for the St. Louis Cardinals of the National Football League (NFL). He played college football for the Ohio State Buckeyes and was selected by the Cardinals in the third round of the 1962 NFL draft.

== Early life ==
Charles S. Bryant was born on September 12, 1940, in Zanesville, Ohio. He was a three-year starter in both football and basketball at Zanesville High School. He was named first-team All-State in football by the Associated Press, United Press International, and International News Service. Bryant also played one year of baseball in high school, batting.488 and driving in 17 runs as a junior. His baseball career ended after he hurt his shoulder.

== College career ==
Bryant enrolled at Ohio State University to play college football for the Buckeyes. He was on the freshman team in 1958 and was a three-year varsity letterman from 1959 to 1961. He played in all nine games for the Buckeyes as a junior in 1960, catching 17 passes for 336 yards and a Big Ten-leading four touchdowns. Bryant also led the country in yards-per-reception (19.8). He appeared in all nine games for the second straight year in 1961, recording 15 receptions for 270 yards and four touchdowns as the Buckeyes were named FWAA national champions.

== Professional career ==
Bryant played in the Blue–Gray Football Classic, Senior Bowl, and Chicago Charities College All-Star Game. In the 1962 College All-Star Game, he caught a touchdown from John Hadl and suffered an ankle injury. He finished second in voting for game MVP honors behind Hadl. Bryant was selected by the St. Louis Cardinals in the third round, with the 34th overall pick, of the 1962 NFL draft and by the San Diego Chargers in the 13th round, with the 104th overall pick, of the 1962 AFL draft. He chose to sign with the Cardinals. He played in 13 games for the Cardinals during the 1962 season as a reserve end but did not record any statistics. Bryant was released on September 5, 1963, before the final game of the 1963 preseason.

== Post-NFL career ==
Bryant's father, Clay Bryant, played in Major League Baseball. Chuck was a high school football, golf, and basketball coach at several schools in Ohio. He also officiated basketball games and was the president of the Northern Ohio Officials Association. His 1994 Lorain Sports Hall of Fame Museum induction profile said he was "one of two men ever to play, coach and officiate in Ohio state basketball tournaments."

Bryant played both slow-pitch and fastpitch softball, appearing in two "Softball World Series". He died on October 12, 2020, at SharonBrooke Senior Living in Newark, Ohio.

== See also ==
- List of NCAA major college football yearly receiving leaders
