= Jim Conley =

American football player

Profile
- Position: End

Personal information
- Born: c. 1943
- Listed height: 6 ft 3 in (1.91 m)
- Listed weight: 198 lb (90 kg)

Career information
- College: University of Michigan (1962–1964)

Awards and highlights
- First-team All-Big Ten (1964)

Jim Conley (born c. 1943) is an American former football player. He played college football as an end for the Michigan Wolverines from 1962 to 1964. He was the captain of the Big Ten champion 1964 Michigan Wolverines football team and was selected as a first-team defensive end on the 1964 All-Big Ten Conference football team.

Conley grew up in Springdale, Pennsylvania. He attended Springdale High School and earned all-state honors as a fullback.

In June 1961, Conley announced his plan to enroll at the University of Michigan and to study hospital administration. He played for Michigan's all-freshman football team in the fall of 1961. He was a member of Michigan's varsity football team from 1962 to 1964. In December 1963, he was elected by his teammates as captain of the 1964 team. The 1964 team compiled a 9–1 record, won the Big Ten championship for the first time since 1950, and defeated Oregon State in the 1965 Rose Bowl by a score of 34–7. The 1964 Wolverines defeated four teams ranked in the Top 10 in the AP Poll by a combined score of 82 to 17 and finished the regular season ranked No. 4 in both the AP and Coaches' polls. At the end of the 1964 season, Conley was selected by the UPI as a first-team defensive end on the 1964 All-Big Ten Conference football team.
