= Sam Tidmore =

American football player (born 1969)

No. 54
- Position: Linebacker

Personal information
- Born: October 28, 1938 (age 88); Decatur, Illinois, U. S.
- Listed height: 6 ft 1 in (1.85 m)
- Listed weight: 230 lb (104 kg)

Career information
- High school: John Adams (Cleveland, Ohio)
- College: Ohio State (1957–1961)
- NFL draft: 1962: 6th round, 81st overall pick
- AFL draft: 1962: 20th round, 156th overall pick

Career history
- Cleveland Browns (1963–1964); Pittsburgh Steelers (1964)*; Hamilton Tiger-Cats (1964)
- * Offseason or practice squad member only

Awards and highlights
- National champion (1961)

Career NFL statistics
- Games played: 18
- Games started: 2
- Return yards: 44
- Fumble recoveries: 1
- Stats at Pro Football Reference

Samuel Edward Tidmore (born October 28, 1938) is an American former professional football linebacker who played in the National Football League (NFL) with the Cleveland Browns and in the Canadian Football League (CFL) with the Hamilton Tiger-Cats. He played college football for the Ohio State Buckeyes.

== Early life ==
Tidmore was born on October 28, 1938, Decatur, Illinois. He attended John Adams High School in Cleveland, Ohio.

== College career ==
Tidmore played college football for the Ohio State Buckeyes from 1957 to 1961. He spent the 1957 season on the freshman team but saw playing time as a sophomore in nine games. Tidmore had one catch for 26 yards and a touchdown against Indiana. He was ruled academically ineligible for 1959 season but lettered in his last two years at Ohio State. Over that time, Tidmore had three catches for 30 yards and a touchdown at end.

== Professional career ==
=== Cleveland Browns ===
Tidmore was selected in the sixth round, with the 81st overall selection, by the Cleveland Browns in the 1962 NFL draft and in the 20th round, with the 156th overall selection, by the Buffalo Bills in the 1962 AFL draft. In his rookie season, he played in 13 games, where he returned two kickoffs for 39 yards. The following year, Tidmore played in five games before he was placed on the injured reserve on October 26, 1963. He logged one fumble recovery and five return yards.

=== Pittsburgh Steelers ===
On July 21, 1964, Tidmore was traded to the Pittsburgh Steelers for a future draft pick. On August 2, he was waived by the team.

=== Hamilton Tiger-Cats ===
On August 17, 1964, Tidmore was signed by the Hamilton Tiger-Cats of the Canadian Football League (CFL). He played in just one game against the Winnipeg Blue Bombers before he was released on August 23.
