= Julian J. Hook =

American politician (1941–2022)

Julian James Hook (April 18, 1941 – April 4, 2022) was an American lawyer and politician.

Hook was born in Evanston, Illinois. He graduated from Robbinsdale High School in 1959. Hook received his bachelor's and master's degree from the University of Minnesota and was on the Minnesota Golden Gophers football team. He also graduated from the University of Minnesota Law School and was admitted to the Minnesota bar. He worked in the office of the Minnesota Attorney General as a special assistant attorney general. Hook served in the Minnesota House of Representatives from 1971 to 1974. Hook lived in St. Louis Park, Minnesota, in Golden Valley, Minnesota, and in Navarre, Minnesota, with his wife and family. He was ill with leukemia.
