= Sammie Harris =

Canadian football player (born 1939)

Profile
- Position: Halfback

Personal information
- Born: 1939 (age 86–87); United States
- Listed height: 6 ft 0 in (1.83 m)
- Listed weight: 190 lb (86 kg)

Career information
- College: Iowa

Career history
- 1963–1964: Edmonton Eskimos

Sammie Harris (born 1939) is an American-born Canadian football player who played for the Edmonton Eskimos.
