= Jack Elwell =

American football player (1940–2024)

No. 81
- Position: Wide receiver

Personal information
- Born: August 1, 1940; Cleveland, Ohio, U.S.
- Died: September 4, 2024 (aged 84); Brookfield, Wisconsin, U.S.
- Listed height: 6 ft 3 in (1.91 m)
- Listed weight: 200 lb (91 kg)

Career information
- High school: Cathedral Latin
- College: Purdue
- NFL draft: 1962: 6th round, 75th overall pick
- AFL draft: 1962: 3rd round, 20th overall pick

Career history
- St. Louis Cardinals (1962); Toronto Argonauts (1963)

Career NFL statistics
- Games played: 13
- Receptions: 1
- Receiving yards: 11
- Receiving TDs: 0
- Stats at Pro Football Reference

John "Jack" Matthew Elwell (August 1, 1940 – September 4, 2024) was a professional football wide receiver for the Saint Louis Cardinals of the National Football League (NFL). He also played for the Toronto Argonauts in 1963.

== High school career ==
Elwell played for Cathedral Latin School.

== College career ==
Elwell played for Purdue University, where he was named the Most Valuable Player as a senior, when he led the team in receiving.

== NFL career statistics ==
Year	Team	Games		Receiving				
Year	Team	GP	GS	Rec	Yds	Avg	Lng	TDs
1962	STL	13	0	1	11	11.0	11	0
Career		13	0	1	11	11.0	11	0
Source: Pro-Football-Reference.com
