= 1961 Ohio State Buckeyes football team =

American college football season

1961 Ohio State Buckeyes football
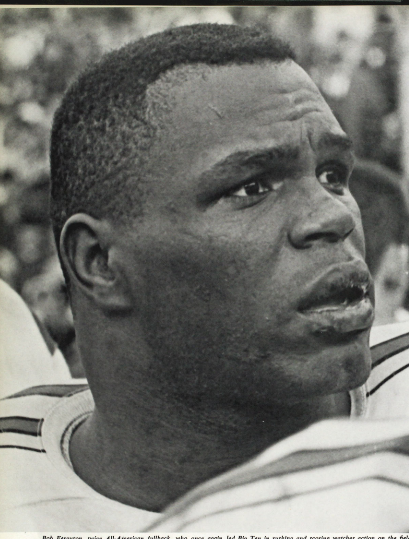
- Maxwell Award winner Bob Ferguson

FWAA national champion Big Ten champion
- Conference: Big Ten Conference

Ranking
- Coaches: No. 2
- AP: No. 2
- Record: 8–0–1 (6-0 Big Ten)
- Head coach: Woody Hayes (11th season)
- Captains: Mike Ingram; Tom Perdue
- Home stadium: Ohio Stadium

1961 Big Ten Conference football standings
	Conf.					Overall
Team	W		L		T	W		L		T
No. 2 Ohio State $	6	–	0	–	0	8	–	0	–	1
No. 6 Minnesota	6	–	1	–	0	8	–	2	–	0
No. 8 Michigan State	5	–	2	–	0	7	–	2	–	0
No. 12 Purdue	4	–	2	–	0	6	–	3	–	0
Wisconsin	4	–	3	–	0	6	–	3	–	0
Michigan	3	–	3	–	0	6	–	3	–	0
Iowa	2	–	4	–	0	5	–	4	–	0
Northwestern	2	–	4	–	0	4	–	5	–	0
Indiana	0	–	6	–	0	2	–	7	–	0
Illinois	0	–	7	–	0	0	–	9	–	0
$ – Conference champion; Rankings from AP Poll

The 1961 Ohio State Buckeyes football team was an American football team that represented Ohio State University in the 1961 Big Ten Conference football season. In their 11th year under head coach Woody Hayes, the Buckeyes compiled an 8–0–1 record (6–0 in conference games), won the Big Ten Conference (Big Ten) championship, and outscored opponents by a total of 221 to 83. They tied with TCU (7–7) in the season opener and then won nine consecutive games, including victories over No. 8 Iowa (29–13) and rival Michigan (50–20). Ohio State was ranked No. 2 in the final AP writers and UPI coaches polls. However, the Football Writers Association of America (FWAA) chose Ohio State as national champion over undefeated Alabama.

Fullback Bob Ferguson, who led the team with 938 rushing yards and 11 touchdowns, was the first African-American player to win the Maxwell Award as the best player in college football. He finished second in close voting for the 1961 Heisman Trophy. Other notable contributors to the 1961 Ohio State team included halfbacks Paul Warfield and Matt Snell, guard Mike Ingram, tackle Bob Vogel, and linebacker Gary Moeller.

Days after the conclusion of the regular season, and with growing concern over Ohio State's reputation as a "football school", Ohio State's faculty council voted to reject an invitation to play in the Rose Bowl. The decision prompted protests by students on the school's campus.

The team played it home games at Ohio Stadium in Columbus, Ohio, and led the nation in home attendance with an average crowd size of 82,941 for five home games.

== Schedule ==
Date	Time	Opponent	Rank	Site	TV	Result	Attendance	Source
September 30	1:30 p.m.	TCU*	No. 3	Ohio Stadium; Columbus, OH		T 7–7	82,878	
October 7	1:30 p.m.	UCLA*	No. 8	Ohio Stadium; Columbus, OH		W 13–3	82,992	
October 14	1:00 p.m.	Illinois	No. 7	Ohio Stadium; Columbus, OH (Illibuck)		W 44–0	82,374	
October 21		at Northwestern	No. 7	Dyche Stadium; Evanston, IL		W 10–0	43,259	
October 28		at Wisconsin	No. 6	Camp Randall Stadium; Madison, WI	ABC	W 30–21	58,411	
November 4	1:30 p.m.	No. 9 Iowa^{†}	No. 5	Ohio Stadium; Columbus, OH		W 29–13	83,795	
November 11		at Indiana	No. 3	Seventeenth Street Football Stadium; Bloomington, IN		W 16–7	27,108	
November 18	1:30 p.m.	Oregon*	No. 3	Ohio Stadium; Columbus, OH		W 22–12	82,073	
November 25	1:00 p.m.	at Michigan	No. 2	Michigan Stadium; Ann Arbor, MI (rivalry)	ABC	W 50–20	80,444	
*Non-conference game; ^{†}Homecoming; Rankings from AP Poll released prior to the game; All times are in Eastern time

== Game summaries ==
=== TCU ===
Team	1	2	3	4	Total
TCU	0	0	0	7	7
Ohio St	7	0	0	0	7

- Date: September 30
- Location: Ohio Stadium, Columbus, Ohio
- Game attendance: 82,878
- Game weather: Sunny; 82 °F (28 °C); wind 20 mph

Scoring summary
Q1	7:05	OHST	Bryant 2 yard pass from Mrukowski (Van Raaphorst kick)	OHST 7–0
Q4	11:20	TCU	Glasscock 12 yard pass from Gibbs (McAteer kick)	Tie 7–7

=== UCLA ===
Team	1	2	3	4	Total
UCLA	0	3	0	0	3
• Ohio St	0	0	0	13	13

- Date: October 7
- Location: Ohio Stadium, Columbus, Ohio
- Game attendance: 82,992
- Game weather: Sunny; 72 °F (22 °C); wind 5 mph ESE

Scoring summary
Q2	2:22	UCLA	Smith 32 yard field goal	UCLA 3–0
Q4	14:14	OHST	Warfield 13 yard run (Van Raaphorst kick)	OHST 7–3
Q4	9:30	OHST	Snell 33 yard run (kick failed)	OHST 13–3

=== Illinois ===
Team	1	2	3	4	Total
Illinois	0	0	0	0	0
• Ohio St	0	21	16	7	44

- Date: October 14
- Location: Ohio Stadium, Columbus, Ohio
- Game attendance: 82,974
- Game weather: Cloudy; 48 °F (9 °C); wind 15 mph NNW

Scoring summary
Q2	13:03	OHST	Ferguson 2 yard run (Van Raaphorst kick)	OHST 7–0
Q2	10:43	OHST	Warfield 36 yard run (Van Raaphorst kick)	OHST 14–0
Q2	:09	OHST	Ferguson 2 yard run (Van Raaphorst kick)	OHST 21–0
Q3	9:08	OHST	Ferguson 3 yard run (Van Raaphorst kick)	OHST 28–0
Q3	7:53	OHST	Safety, Mills tackled in end zone	OHST 30–0
Q3	3:09	OHST	Ferguson 1 yard run (Van Raaphorst kick)	OHST 37–0
Q4	8:10	OHST	Johnson 11 yard pass from Mummey (Van Raaphorst kick)	OHST 44–0

=== Northwestern ===
Team	1	2	3	4	Total
• Ohio St	0	3	0	7	10
Northwestern	0	0	0	0	0

- Date: October 21
- Location: Dyche Stadium, Evanston, Illinois
- Game attendance: 43,259
- Game weather: Cloudy; 48 °F (9 °C)

Scoring summary
Q2	14:50	OHST	Van Raaphorst 24 yard field goal	OHST 3–0
Q4	2:04	OHST	Mrukowski 20 yard run (Van Raaphorst kick)	OHST 10–0

=== Wisconsin ===
Team	1	2	3	4	Total
• Ohio St	7	10	6	7	30
Wisconsin	0	15	0	6	21

- Date: October 28
- Location: Camp Randall Stadium, Madison, Wisconsin
- Game attendance: 58,411
- Game weather: Cloudy; 52 °F (11 °C); wind 10 mph S
- Referee: Tony Skover

Scoring summary
Q1	5:55	OHST	Katterhenrich 17 yard run (Van Raaphorst kick)	OHST 7–0
Q2	14:28	OHST	Van Raaphorst 23 yard field goal	OHST 10–0
Q2	9:57	WIS	Kroner 36 yard pass from Miller (Mckinney pass from Bakken)	OHST 10–8
Q2	1:41	OHST	Klein 8 yard run (Van Raaphorst kick)	OHST 17–8
Q2	:01	WIS	Miller 1 yard run (Bakken kick)	OHST 17–15
Q3	3:23	OHST	Warfield 5 yard run (pass failed)	OHST 23–15
Q4	1:36	OHST	Warfield 2 yard run (Van Raaphorst kick)	OHST 30–15
Q4	:02	WIS	Richter 7 yard pass from Miller (pass failed)	OHST 30–21

=== Iowa ===
Team	1	2	3	4	Total
Iowa	0	0	7	6	13
• Ohio St	6	6	0	17	29

- Date: November 4
- Location: Ohio Stadium, Columbus, Ohio
- Game attendance: 83,795
- Game weather: Cloudy; 46 °F (8 °C); wind 5 mph E

Scoring summary
Q1	11:07	OHST	Perdue 55 yard fumble return (kick failed)	OHST 6–0
Q2	6:35	OHST	Bryant 18 yard pass from Sparma (kick failed)	OHST 12–0
Q3	6:18	IOWA	Szykowny 1 yard run (Szykowny kick)	OHST 12–7
Q4	14:39	OHST	Bryant 62 yard pass from Sparma (Van Raaphorst kick)	OHST 19–7
Q4	8:04	OHST	Van Raaphorst 24 yard field goal	OHST 22–7
Q4	1:55	OHST	Ferguson 13 yard run (Van Raaphorst kick)	OHST 29–7
Q4	:12	IOWA	Turici 4 yard run (kick failed)	OHST 29–13

=== Indiana ===
Team	1	2	3	4	Total
• Ohio St	0	9	7	0	16
Indiana	0	7	0	0	7

- Date: November 11
- Location: Memorial Stadium, Bloomington, Indiana
- Game attendance: 27,106
- Game weather: 56 °F (13 °C); wind 8 mph SSE

Scoring summary
Q2	7:43	OHST	Van Raaphorst 40 yard field goal	OHST 3–0
Q2	5:11	OHST	Warfield 5 yard pass from Sparma (kick failed)	OHST 9–0
Q2	3:42	IND	Olsavsky 25 yard pass from Broome (George kick)	OHST 9–7
Q3	3:42	OHST	Bryant 9 yard pass from Sparma (Van Raaphorst kick)	OHST 16-7

=== Oregon ===
Team	1	2	3	4	Total
Oregon	0	6	0	6	12
• Ohio St	8	7	7	0	22

- Date: November 18
- Location: Ohio Stadium, Columbus, Ohio
- Game attendance: 82,073
- Game weather: Sunny; 38 °F (3 °C); wind 9 mph NNW

Scoring summary
Q1	13:48	OHST	Klein 72 yard run (Ferguson run)	OHST 8–0
Q2	13:52	OHST	Ferguson 7 yard run (Van Raaphorst kick)	OHST 15–0
Q2	:48	ORE	Burleson 29 yard pass from Renfro (pass failed)	OHST 15–6
Q3	9:09	OHST	Ferguson 6 yard run (Van Raaphorst kick)	OHST 22–6
Q4	4:39	ORE	Josephson 2 yard run (pass failed))	OHST 22–12

=== Michigan ===
Team	1	2	3	4	Total
• Ohio St	7	14	0	29	50
Michigan	0	6	6	8	20

- Date: November 25
- Location: Michigan Stadium, Ann Arbor, Michigan
- Game attendance: 80,444
- Game weather: Clear

Scoring summary
Q1	3:26	OHST	Ferguson 12 yard run (Van Raaphorst kick)	OHST 7–0
Q2	11:04	OHST	Ferguson 1 yard run (Van Raaphorst kick)	OHST 14–0
Q2	10:49	MICH	Raimey 90 yard kickoff return (pass failed)	OHST 14–6
Q2	9:04	OHST	Warfield 69 yard run (Van Raaphorst kick)	OHST 21–6
Q3	7:36	MICH	McLenna 1 yard run (pass failed)	OHST 21–12
Q4	14:23	OHST	Ferguson 1 yard run (Van Raaphorst kick)	OHST 28–12
Q4	9:50	OHST	Klein 80 yard pass from Sparma (Van Raaphorst kick)	OHST 35–12
Q4	4:45	OHST	Ferguson 1 yard run (Van Raaphorst kick)	OHST 42–12
Q4	:34	MICH	Ward 1 yard run (Ward run)	OHST 42–20
Q4	:05	OHST	Tidmore 10 yard pass from Sparma (Tidmore pass from Sparma)	OHST 50–20

On November 25, 1961, Ohio State defeated Michigan, 50-20, before a crowd of 80,444 at Michigan Stadium. Ohio State fullback Bob Ferguson scored four touchdowns in the game. Paul Warfield also scored on a 69-yard run, and Bob Klein scored on an 80-yard touchdown pass from Joe Sparma. The Buckeyes' 50 points was the fourth highest point total allowed by a Michigan team up to that time, with two of the prior occasions occurring in the 1890s. Michigan's Dave Raimey returned a kickoff 90 yards for a touchdown.

The 1961 Ohio State team featured Michigan's next two head coaches. Bo Schembechler was Hayes' line coach, and Gary Moeller was a linebacker for the 1961 Buckeyes.

== Statistics ==
The 1961 Buckeyes ran the ball an average of 58 time per game and tallied an average of 271.9 rushing yards per game. They relied far less on a passing game, averaging only 10 passes per game for 77.2 yards per game. On defense, they gave up an average of 123.8 rushing yards and 129.8 passing yards per game.

The team's leading rushers were Bob Ferguson (938 yards, 202 attempts, 4.6-yard average), Paul Warfield (420 yards, 77 attempts, 5.5-yard average), John Mummey (392 yards, 69 attempts, 5.7-yard average), Matt Snell (197 yards, 50 attempts, 3.9-yard average), and Bob Klein (177 yards, 26 attempts, 6.8-yard average).

Joe Sparma, who later played professional baseball for the Detroit Tigers, led the team in passing yardage, completing 16 of 38 passes for 341 yards, six touchdowns, two interceptions, and a 159.1 quarterback rating. William Mrukowski led the team in completions with 23 completed passes out of 35 attempts; he tallied 231 passing yards and a 119.2 quarterback rating.

The leading receivers were Chuck Bryant (15 receptions, 270 yards, 18.0-yard average), Paul Warfield (9 receptions, 120 yards, 13.3-yard average), and Bob Klein (4 receptions, 112 yards, 28.0-yard average).

== Awards ==
Fullback Bob Ferguson received multiple awards and honors following the 1961 season.

- Ferguson received the Maxwell Award as the outstanding player in college football in 1961. He also received "Player of the Year" awards from the United Press International (UPI) and the Sporting News.
- Ferguson finished second in close voting for the 1961 Heisman Trophy. Syracuse back Ernie Davis won the trophy with 824 points, and Ferguson had 771 points.
- Ferguson was a consensus first-team All-American, receiving first-team honors from the American Football Coaches Association, Associated Press (AP), UPI, and Football Writers Association of America, among others.
- He received first-team honors from both the AP and UPI on the 1961 All-Big Ten Conference football team.
- Ferguson was unanimously selected by his teammates as the most valuable player on the 1961 Ohio State team.
- He finished second by two points to Sandy Stephens in voting for the Chicago Tribune Silver Football as the Big Ten's most valuable player. It was one of the closest votes in the history of the award.

Guard Mike Ingram received second-team All-America honors from both the AP and UPI. He also received first-team honors from the same wire services on the 1961 All-Big Ten team.

Five Ohio State players received second- or third-team recognition on the All-Big Ten team: end Tom Perdue (AP-2, UPI-3); tackle Bob Vogel (UPI-2); center Bill Armstrong (AP-3); end Chuck Bryant (UPI-3); and halfback Paul Warfield (UPI-3).

== Personnel ==
=== Coaching staff ===
- Woody Hayes – Head coach – 11th year

=== Roster ===
1961 Ohio State Buckeyes football team roster
Players
Coaches
Offense

Pos.	#	Name	Class
C	53	Billy Joe Armstrong	Jr
G	71	James Bearss	So
HB, DB	12	Bob Bruney	So
E	88	Charles Bryant	Sr
OT	54	Dennis Carter	So
FB, LB	32	Roger Detrick	Sr
FB, LB	46	Bob Ferguson	Sr
G	66	Charles Foreman	Sr
G	69	Rod Foster	Jr
FB	33	Dave Francis	Jr
C	58	Dean Fronk	So
HB	15	Tony Hall	So
FB	35	Woody Hall	So
HB	47	Gary Honsley	Sr
G	62	Dennis Hullinger	So
G, LB	64	Mike Ingram (C)	Sr
G	65	Tom Jenkins	So
HB, DB	21	Ken Johnson	Jr
HB	45	William Jones	So
HB	19	Bob Klein	Jr
OT	61	Raymond Krstolic	Jr
HB	48	Karl Kumler	Jr
FB	17	Howard Lambert	Sr
OT	70	Richard Laskoski	Jr
QB	23	Robert Lister	Sr
HB	43	Richard Mangiamelle	Jr
QB	27	Larry Marmie	So
E	91	Paul Martin	Sr
E	80	Robert Middleton	Jr
C	56	Richard Morgan	So
QB	26	Bill Mrukowski	Jr
QB	25	John Mummey	Jr
E	90	Joseph Nourse	So
E, DE	83	Ormonde Ricketts	So
OT	75	Jack Roberts	Sr
OT, DL	76	Daryl Sanders	Jr
E	84	Keith Smith	So
HB, LB	41	Matt Snell	So
QB	24	Joe Sparma	So
OT	72	Bernie Stanley	So
HB	16	David Tingley	Sr
E, PK	86	Dick Van Raaphorst	So
C	50	Jerry Vanscoy	Jr
OT, DL	73	Bob Vogel	Jr
QB	23	Jack Wallace	Sr
HB, DB	42	Paul Warfield	So
E	82	George Wittmer	Sr
C	51	Albert Zima	Jr

Defense

Pos.	#	Name	Class
MG	55	Wayne Betz	Jr
DL	34	Robert Butts	Jr
DL	93	Dennis Clotz	Sr
DL	77	Dan Connor	Jr
DB	28	Bill Hess	Jr
DB	49	Ron Houck	Sr
MG	67	Dave Katterhenrich	Jr
DT, PK	79	Charles Mamula	So
MG	60	Wes Mirick	So
MG, LB	68	Gary Moeller	Jr
LB	63	Al Parker	So
DE	87	Tom Perdue (C)	Sr
DE	89	Elwood Rayford	Jr
DT	78	George Tolford	Sr
DE	85	Sam Tidmore	Sr
DB	44	Ed Ulmer	Jr

Special teams

Pos.	#	Name	Class
PK	18	Stewart Baffer	So
PK	20	Ben Jones	Jr

Head coach

- Woody Hayes

Coordinators/assistant coaches

- Lyal Clark
- Alan Fiers
- Ernie Godfrey
- Bill Gunlock
- Jim Herbstreit
- Esco Sarkkinen
- Bo Schembechler
- Harry Strobel

Legend

- (C) Team captain
- (S) Suspended
- (I) Ineligible
- Injured
- Redshirt

Roster
Last update: 2024-Feb-24.

=== Depth chart ===
Defense

LB	MLB	LB
Thomas Perdue	Bill Mrukowski	Samuel Tidmore
⋅	⋅	⋅
⋅	⋅	⋅

CB
Bill Hess
Ed Ulmer
⋅

DE	DT	NT	DT	DE
George Tolford	Larry Stephens	Gary Moeller	Mike Ingram	Jack Roberts
⋅	Wesley Mirick	⋅	⋅	⋅
⋅	⋅	⋅	⋅	⋅

CB
Ronald Houck
⋅
⋅

Offense

SE
Chuck Bryant
⋅
⋅

LT	LG	C	RG	RT
Bob Vogel	Thomas Jenkins	Bill Armstrong	Rod Foster	Daryl Sanders
⋅	⋅	Gary Moeller	⋅	Rick Laskoski
⋅	⋅	⋅	⋅	⋅

TE
Robert Middleton
Ormonde Ricketts
⋅

WB
Paul Warfield
⋅
⋅

QB
John Mummey
Bill Mrukowski
⋅

FB
Bob Ferguson
⋅
⋅

Special teams

RB
Matt Snell
Robert Klein
⋅

== 1962 pro draftees ==
Player	Draft	Round	Pick	Position	NFL club
Bob Ferguson	NFL	1	5	Fullback	Pittsburgh Steelers
Bob Ferguson	AFL	1	8	Fullback	San Diego Chargers
Chuck Bryant	NFL	3	34	End	St. Louis Cardinals
Chuck Bryant	AFL	13	104	End	San Diego Chargers
Sam Tidmore	NFL	6	81	Linebacker	Cleveland Browns
Sam Tidmore	AFL	20	156	Linebacker	Buffalo Bills
John Havlicek	NFL	7	95	End	Cleveland Browns
Jack Roberts	NFL	20	273	Tackle	Chicago Bears
Mike Ingram	AFL	31	246	Guard	Boston Patriots
