= Fate Echols =

American football player (1939–2002)

No. 63
- Positions: Offensive tackle, defensive tackle

Personal information
- Born: June 29, 1939; Union Springs, Alabama, U.S.
- Died: October 10, 2002 (aged 63); Springfield, Illinois, U.S.
- Listed height: 6 ft 1 in (1.85 m)
- Listed weight: 258 lb (117 kg)

Career information
- High school: Washington (South Bend, Indiana)
- College: Northwestern (1958–1961)
- NFL draft: 1962: 1st round, 6th overall pick
- AFL draft: 1962: 3rd round, 21st overall pick

Career history
- St. Louis Cardinals (1962–1963); Philadelphia Eagles (1963); Washington Redskins (1966)*; Cincinnati Bengals (1968)*
- * Offseason or practice squad member only

Awards and highlights
- First-team All-Big Ten (1961)

Career NFL statistics
- Sacks: 0.5
- Stats at Pro Football Reference

Fate Leonard Echols (June 29, 1939 – October 10, 2002) was an American professional football tackle who played two seasons with the St. Louis Cardinals of the National Football League (NFL). He was selected by the Cardinals in the first round of the 1962 NFL draft after playing college football at Northwestern University.

== Early life ==
Fate Leonard Echols was born on June 29, 1939, in Union Springs, Alabama. He played high school football Washington High School in South Bend, Indiana as a lineman. He was named all-league during his junior and senior seasons. Echols was a team captain in 1957. He was inducted into the school's athletic hall of fame in 2013.

== College career ==
Echols was a member of the Northwestern Wildcats of Northwestern University from 1958 to 1961 and was a two-year starter. As a senior in 1961, he earned Associated Press second-team All-Big Ten Conference and United Press International first-team All-Big Ten honors. He was invited to the East–West Shrine Game after his senior season. In December 1961, he visited a hospital for sick children with the rest of the Shrine game players.

== Professional career ==
In December 1961, Echols was selected by the St. Louis Cardinals in the first round, with the sixth overall pick, of the 1962 NFL draft and by the New York Titans in the third round, with the 21st overall pick, of the 1962 AFL draft. He signed with the Cardinals on December 8, 1961. He was released on September 12, 1962, but late re-signed. Echols then played in five games during the 1962 season before being placed on injured reserve. He appeared in three games, starting one, for the Cardinals in 1963 before being released on October 8, 1963.

Echols signed with the NFL's Philadelphia Eagles on October 14, 1963. He was released on October 24, 1963, without appearing in a game.

Echols was signed by the Washington Redskins of the NFL on June 10, 1966. He was released on August 10, 1966.

Echols signed with the Cincinnati Bengals of the AFL in 1968. He was later released on July 29, 1968.

== Personal life ==
Echols died on October 10, 2002, in Springfield, Illinois.
