= Stan Sczurek =

American football player (born 1937)

No. 34, 38
- Position: Linebacker

Personal information
- Born: March 7, 1937 (age 89); Cleveland, Ohio, U.S.
- Listed height: 5 ft 11 in (1.80 m)
- Listed weight: 230 lb (104 kg)

Career information
- High school: Benedictine (Cleveland)
- College: Purdue
- NFL draft: 1962: 4th round, 53rd overall pick
- AFL draft: 1962: 24th round, 188th overall pick

Career history
- Cleveland Browns (1963–1965); New York Giants (1966)

Awards and highlights
- NFL champion (1964); Third-team All-American (1961); First-team All-Big Ten (1961)

Career NFL statistics
- Fumble recoveries: 1
- Interceptions: 1
- Sacks: 0.5
- Stats at Pro Football Reference

Stanley Rudolph Sczurek (born March 7, 1937) is an American former professional football player who was a linebacker in the National Football League (NFL). He was drafted by both the NFL and the American Football League (AFL), but he elected to play for his hometown team, the Cleveland Browns, which belonged to the NFL.

Sczurek was released by the Browns before the beginning of the 1966 season. He was later signed by the New York Giants and played one season with them before retiring. He had one fumble recovery and one interception in his brief career, playing 45 games in four seasons; at the time, seasons had 14 games.
