= Ron Miller (American football) =

American football player (1939–2012)

No. 9, 20, 8, 12
- Position: Quarterback

Personal information
- Born: August 19, 1939; Lyons, Illinois, U.S.
- Died: April 26, 2012 (aged 72)
- Listed height: 6 ft 0 in (1.83 m)
- Listed weight: 190 lb (86 kg)

Career information
- High school: J. Sterling Morton East (Cicero, Illinois)
- College: Wisconsin
- NFL draft: 1961: 3rd round, 41st overall pick
- AFL draft: 1961: 21st round, 168th overall pick

Career history

Playing
- Los Angeles Rams (1962); Edmonton Eskimos (1963); Charleston Rockets (1964–1967); Orlando Panthers (1967); Charleston Rockets (1968)

Coaching
- Charleston Rockets (1966) Assistant coach

Awards and highlights
- Sammy Baugh Trophy (1961); NCAA passing yards leader (1961); 2× Second-team All-Big Ten (1960, 1961)

Career NFL statistics
- Passing attempts: 43
- Passing completions: 17
- Completion percentage: 39.5%
- TD–INT: 1–1
- Passing yards: 250
- Passer rating: 57.3
- Stats at Pro Football Reference

Ronald Rudolph Miller (August 19, 1939 – April 26, 2012) was an American professional football player who was a quarterback in the National Football League (NFL). Miller was selected by the Los Angeles Rams in the third round of the 1961 NFL draft and later played with the team during the 1962 NFL season. He was also selected in the twenty-first round of the 1961 American Football League draft by the Houston Oilers.

== See also ==
- List of college football yearly passing leaders
