= Larry Onesti =

American football player (1938–2018)

No. 45
- Position: Linebacker

Personal information
- Born: November 12, 1938; Chicago, Illinois, U.S.
- Died: July 9, 2018 (aged 79); Bloomington, Indiana, U.S.
- Listed height: 6 ft 0 in (1.83 m)
- Listed weight: 195 lb (88 kg)

Career information
- High school: Assumption (Windsor, Ontario)
- College: Northwestern
- NFL draft: 1962: 8th round, 110th overall pick
- AFL draft: 1962: 9th round, 71st overall pick

Career history
- Houston Oilers (1962-1965)

Awards and highlights
- Second-team All-American (1961); First-team All-Big Ten (1961)

Career AFL statistics
- Sacks: 2.5
- Stats at Pro Football Reference

Lawrence Joseph Onesti (November 12, 1938 – July 7, 2018) was an American professional football player who was a linebacker in the American Football League (AFL). He played four seasons for the Houston Oilers.

Onesti was a three-year letterman playing college football for the Northwestern Wildcats from 1959 to 1961, and one of the first NU football players to be named Academic All-America. He won the honor in 1961, following his senior season. As a captain for the 1961 squad, Onesti also was named All-America, All-Big Ten, and Academic All-Big Ten. He is one of only three NU football players to be named both All-America and Academic All-America in the same season. He participated in the 1961 North–South Shrine Game, where he was named MVP for the North team, as well as the 1962 Coaches' All-America Game and the 1962 College All-Star Game. Onesti was a ninth round draft pick of the Houston Oilers in 1962 and played four seasons in the AFL.

Onesti taught for many years at Indiana University Bloomington in the faculty of Geography.

== Early life and education ==
Onesti attended Assumption College High School in Windsor, Ontario, where he began to play football. He went on to college studies at Northwestern University where he played linebacker and was one of the first football players to make Academic All American and was later inducted into the Northwestern Hall of Fame. At Northwestern he studied Education and met his future wife, June Skowronski.

== Career ==
After graduating from Northwestern in 1962, he was selected in the eighth round of the 1962 NFL draft by the Chicago Bears and the ninth round of the 1962 AFL draft by the Houston Oilers. He chose to play for the Oilers because the salary was $1000 more (which always amused him). He and June married in 1964 and moved to Houston where he was a linebacker for the Oilers for four seasons. After his pro football career, he went to Michigan State University where he earned an M.A. in Geology and Geography in 1969. In 1973 he earned a Ph.D. at the University of Wisconsin.

Onesti held postdoctoral teaching positions at the University of Wisconsin, UCLA and the State University of New York at Buffalo. In 1976, he joined the Indiana University Bloomington faculty where he forged a distinguished career as a teacher and researcher, first as an Associate Professor of Geography and then as Professor of Geological Sciences in the Department of Earth and Atmospheric Sciences (formerly Geology). Later in his IU career, he moved to the School of Continuing Studies where he served as Associate Dean of Academic Programs and Principal of Indiana University High School.

Onesti received fellowships from the National Aeronautics and Space Administration (NASA), the Jet Propulsion Laboratory at California Institute of Technology and the Goddard Space Flight Center. His University service at IU ranged from serving on the University Athletic Committee and the Bloomington Faculty Council and being an advisor and mentor for the Briscoe Fellows Program.

Onesti wrote and presented numerous research papers and pursued projects in Russia, China, Mexico, Japan and throughout the United States. He also served as a consultant to the Navajo Nation on mine restoration in Tsaile, Arizona, and as an evaluator of avalanche activity and dynamics for the Alyeska Pipeline in Anchorage, Alaska. In 1992, he was invited by the government of the Kyrgyz Republic (former Soviet Union) to serve as a geological evaluator.
