= 1961 major college football rankings =

- Season: 1961
- Bowl season: 1961–62 bowl games
- Preseason No. 1: Iowa
- End of season champions: Alabama

Two human polls comprised the 1961 major college football rankings. Unlike most sports, college football's governing body, the NCAA, does not bestow a national championship, instead that title is bestowed by one or more different polling agencies. There are two main weekly polls that begin in the preseason—the AP Poll and the Coaches Poll.

== Legend ==
	Increase in ranking
	Decrease in ranking
	Not ranked previous week
	National champion
(#–#)	Win–loss record
(Italics)	Number of first place votes
т	Tied with team above or below also with this symbol

== AP poll ==
The final AP poll was released on December 5, at the end of the regular season, weeks before the bowls. Starting in the 1961 season and until the 1967 season, the AP poll ranked only 10 teams.

	Preseason Aug	Week 1 Sep 25	Week 2 Oct 2	Week 3 Oct 9	Week 4 Oct 16	Week 5 Oct 23	Week 6 Oct 30	Week 7 Nov 6	Week 8 Nov 13	Week 9 Nov 20	Week 10 Nov 27	Week 11 (Final) Dec 5	
1.	Iowa (22)	Iowa (0–0) (19)	Iowa (1–0) (24)	Ole Miss (3–0) (24)	Michigan State (3–0) (16)	Michigan State (4–0) (29)	Michigan State (5–0) (31)	Texas (7–0) (35)	Texas (8–0) (41)	Alabama (9–0) (39)	Alabama (9–0) (26)	Alabama (10–0) (26)	1.
2.	Ohio State (15)	Ole Miss (1–0) (12)	Ole Miss (2–0) (16)	Iowa (2–0) (11)	Ole Miss (4–0) (21)	Ole Miss (5–0) (11)	Ole Miss (6–0) (8)	Alabama (7–0) (6)	Alabama (8–0) (3)	Ohio State (7–0–1) (6)	Ohio State (8–0–1) (21)	Ohio State (8–0–1) (20)	2.
3.	Alabama (3)	Ohio State (0–0) (7)	Georgia Tech (2–0) (7)	Alabama (3–0) (4)	Texas (4–0) (2)	Texas (5–0) (3)	Texas (6–0) (6)	Ohio State (5–0–1) (7)	Ohio State (6–0–1) (2)	Minnesota (7–1) (2)	LSU (9–1) (1)	Texas (9–1)	3.
4.	Texas (1)	Alabama (1–0) (6)	Alabama (2–0) (1)	Texas (3–0) (3)	Iowa (3–0) (2)	Alabama (5–0) (4)	Alabama (6–0) (2)	LSU (6–1)	LSU (7–1) (1)	LSU (8–1) (1)	Texas (9–1)	LSU (9–1) (1)	4.
5.	LSU	Syracuse (1–0)	Texas (2–0) (2)	Michigan State (2–0) (2)	Alabama (4–0) (4)	Iowa (4–0) (1)	Ohio State (4–0–1)	Minnesota (5–1)	Minnesota (6–1)	Texas (8–1)	Ole Miss (8–1) (1)	Ole Miss (9–1) (1)	5.
6.	Michigan State	Texas (1–0) (1)	Michigan State (1–0) (1)	Michigan (2–0) (2)	Notre Dame (3–0) (1)	Ohio State (3–0–1)	LSU (5–1)	Michigan State (5–1)	Ole Miss (7–1)	Ole Miss (8–1) (1)	Colorado (8–1)	Minnesota (7–2)	6.
7.	Penn State (1)	Rice (0–0) (2)	Syracuse (2–0)	Ohio State (1–0–1)	Ohio State (2–0–1) (1)	LSU (4–1)	Georgia Tech (5–1)	Ole Miss (6–1)	Purdue (5–2)	Colorado (7–1)	Minnesota (7–2)	Colorado (9–1)	7.
8.	Kansas (1)	Penn State (1–0) (2)	Ohio State (0–0–1)	Notre Dame (2–0) (1)	Georgia Tech (3–1)	Notre Dame (3–1)	Colorado (5–0)	Colorado (6–0)	Colorado (6–1)	Michigan State (6–2)	Michigan State (7–2)	Michigan State (7–2)	8.
9.	Ole Miss (2)	UCLA (1–0)	Michigan (1–0)	Baylor (2–0)	Colorado (3–0)	Georgia Tech (4–1)	Iowa (4–1)	Georgia Tech (6–1)	Michigan State (5–2)	Arkansas (7–2)	Arkansas (8–2)	Arkansas (8–2)	9.
10.	Syracuse	Michigan State (0–0)	Baylor (1–0)	Maryland (3–0)	Arkansas (3–1) т	Colorado (4–0)	Missouri (5–0–1)	Missouri (5–1–1)	Syracuse (6–2)	Kansas (6–2–1)	Missouri (7–2–1)	Utah State (9–0–1)	10.
	Preseason Aug	Week 1 Sep 25	Week 2 Oct 2	Week 3 Oct 9	Week 4 Oct 16	Week 5 Oct 23	Week 6 Oct 30	Week 7 Nov 6	Week 8 Nov 13	Week 9 Nov 20	Week 10 Nov 27	Week 11 (Final) Dec 5	
		Dropped: Kansas; LSU	Dropped: UCLA; Penn State; Rice	Dropped: Georgia Tech; Syracuse	Dropped: Baylor; Maryland; Michigan	Dropped: Arkansas	Dropped: Notre Dame	Dropped: Iowa	Dropped: Georgia Tech; Missouri	Dropped: Purdue; Syracuse	Dropped: Kansas	Dropped: Missouri	

== UPI Coaches Poll ==
The final United Press International (UPI) Coaches Poll was released prior to the bowl games, on December 5.
Alabama received 18 of the 35 first-place votes; Ohio State received fifteen, Ole Miss one, and Colorado one.

Ranking	Team	Conference	Bowl
1	Alabama	SEC	Won Sugar, 10–3
2	Ohio State	Big Ten	none
3	LSU	SEC	Won Orange, 25–7
4	Texas	Southwest	Won Cotton, 12–7
5	Ole Miss	SEC	Lost Cotton, 7–12
6	Minnesota	Big Ten	Won Rose, 21–3
7	Colorado	Big Eight	Lost Orange, 7–25
8	Arkansas	Southwest	Lost Sugar, 3–10
9	Michigan State	Big Ten	none
10	Utah State	Skyline	Lost Gotham, 9–24
11	Purdue	Big Ten	none
11	Missouri	Big Eight	none
13	Georgia Tech	SEC	Lost Gator, 15–30
14	Duke	ACC	none
15	Kansas	Big Eight	Won Bluebonnet, 33–7
16	Syracuse	Independent	Won Liberty, 15–14
17	Wyoming	Skyline	none
18	Wisconsin	Big Ten	none
19	Miami (FL)	Independent	Lost Liberty, 14–15
19	Penn State	Independent	Won Gator, 30–15

- Prior to the 1975 season, the Big Ten and AAWU (later Pac-8) conferences allowed only one postseason participant each, for the Rose Bowl.
- The Ivy League has prohibited its members from participating in postseason football since the league was officially formed in 1954.

== See also ==
- 1961 College Football All-America Team
