= Sherwyn Thorson =

American gridiron football player (1940–2016)

Profile
- Position: Guard

Personal information
- Born: May 10, 1940; Fort Dodge, Iowa, U.S.
- Died: April 6, 2016 (aged 75); Fort Dodge, Iowa, U.S.
- Listed height: 6 ft 1 in (1.85 m)
- Listed weight: 225 lb (102 kg)

Career information
- College: Iowa
- NFL draft: 1962: 7th round, 87th overall pick
- AFL draft: 1962: 3rd round, 22nd overall pick

Career history
- 1962–1968: Winnipeg Blue Bombers

Awards and highlights
- Grey Cup champion (1962); Second-team All-Big Ten (1961)

Sherwyn Arthur Thorson (May 10, 1940 – April 6, 2016) was an American professional football player who played for the Winnipeg Blue Bombers and won the Grey Cup with them in 1962. Thorson played college football and wrestled at heavyweight with the University of Iowa, placing 2nd in 1960 and 1st in 1962. He was inducted into the Iowa Wrestling Hall of Fame (2007) and University of Iowa Athletics Hall of Fame (2011). He died of cancer in 2016.
