= Ron Hatcher =

American football player (born 1939)

No. 36, 26
- Position: Fullback

Personal information
- Born: July 3, 1939 (age 87); Pittsburgh, Pennsylvania, U.S.
- Listed height: 5 ft 11 in (1.80 m)
- Listed weight: 215 lb (98 kg)

Career information
- College: Michigan State (1958-1961)
- NFL draft: 1962: 8th round, 99th overall pick
- AFL draft: 1962: 21st round, 165th overall pick

Career history
- Washington Redskins (1962); Toronto Argonauts (1963–1964)
- Stats at Pro Football Reference

Ronald Allen Hatcher (born July 3, 1939) is an American former professional football player who was a fullback for the Washington Redskins of the National Football League (NFL). He played college football for the Michigan State Spartans and was selected 99th overall in the eighth round of the 1962 NFL draft. Hatcher was also selected in the 21st round of the 1962 AFL draft by the New York Titans.
