= List of Georgia Bulldogs in the NFL draft =

This is a list of Georgia Bulldogs football players selected in the NFL draft.

== Key ==
B	Back	K	Kicker	NT	Nose tackle
C	Center	LB	Linebacker	FB	Fullback
DB	Defensive back	P	Punter	HB	Halfback
DE	Defensive end	QB	Quarterback	WR	Wide receiver
DT	Defensive tackle	RB	Running back	G	Guard
E	End	T	Offensive tackle	TE	Tight end

== Selections ==
Year	Round	Pick	Overall	Player	Team	Position
1938	8	9	69	Bill Hartman	Washington Redskins	B
1938	11	7	97	Pete Tinsley	Green Bay Packers	G
1939	7	8	58	Quinton Lumpkin	Washington Redskins	C
1939	14	9	129	Bill Badgett	Green Bay Packers	T
1940	8	7	67	Jim Fordham	Chicago Bears	B
1942	14	2	122	Tom Greene	Cleveland Rams	T
1943	1	1	1	Frank Sinkwich	Detroit Lions	RB
1943	2	2	12	Lamar Davis	Philadelphia Eagles	B
1943	8	1	61	George Poschner	Detroit Lions	E
1943	8	4	64	Bill Godwin	Chicago Cardinals	C
1943	12	8	108	Van Davis	Green Bay Packers	E
1943	17	5	155	Walt Ruark	Cleveland Rams	G
1943	23	3	213	Cliff Kimsey	Chicago Cardinals	B
1944	11	5	103	Carl Grate	New York Giants	G
1944	19	7	193	Clyde Ehrhardt	Washington Redskins	C
1944	30	10	317	Dick McPhee	Cleveland Rams	B
1944	30	11	318	Gus Letchas	Boston Yanks	B
1945	1	1	1	Charley Trippi	Chicago Cardinals	B
1945	6	11	54	Don Wells	Green Bay Packers	T
1945	20	7	204	Mike Castronis	Detroit Lions	G
1945	23	3	233	Johnny Cook	Chicago Cardinals	B
1945	24	2	243	Ardie McClure	Chicago Cardinals	T
1946	7	10	60	Lafayette King	Los Angeles Rams	E
1946	13	9	119	Joe Tereshinski Sr.	Washington Redskins	E
1946	16	10	150	Larry Bouley	Los Angeles Rams	B
1946	17	6	156	J.P. Miller	Green Bay Packers	G
1946	27	7	257	Sam Bailey	Philadelphia Eagles	E
1946	29	4	274	Johnny Cook	Chicago Bears	B
1946	30	10	290	Frank Plant	Los Angeles Rams	C
1947	7	10	55	Reid Moseley	Chicago Bears	E
1947	16	7	142	Charlie Smith	Chicago Cardinals	B
1947	24	5	220	Herb St. John	Green Bay Packers	G
1947	29	6	271	Ray Sellers	Green Bay Packers	E
1948	1	9	9	Dan Edwards	Pittsburgh Steelers	E
1948	5	6	31	Weyman Sellers	Green Bay Packers	E
1948	21	6	191	Herbert St. John	Green Bay Packers	G
1948	24	9	224	Jimmy Gatewood	Chicago Bears	B
1948	29	10	275	Bernie Reid	Chicago Cardinals	G
1949	1	2	2	John Rauch	Detroit Lions	QB
1949	4	5	36	Joe Geri	Pittsburgh Steelers	B
1949	11	7	108	Homer Hobbs	Washington Redskins	G
1949	19	5	186	Ken McCall	New York Giants	B
1949	21	4	205	Joe Jackura	Pittsburgh Steelers	C
1950	4	6	46	Porter Payne	New York Giants	G
1950	9	2	107	Floyd Reid	Chicago Bears	B
1950	11	3	134	Gene Lorendo	Green Bay Packers	E
1950	17	7	216	Al Bodine	Pittsburgh Steelers	B
1950	30	6	384	Hamp Tanner	New York Giants	T
1951	3	2	28	Bill Mixon	San Francisco 49ers	B
1951	10	2	112	Nick Feher	San Francisco 49ers	G
1951	14	7	166	Bobby Walston	Philadelphia Eagles	E
1951	18	5	212	Pat Field	Pittsburgh Steelers	B
1951	23	11	278	Dick Yelvington	New York Giants	T
1952	4	9	46	Marion Campbell	San Francisco 49ers	T
1952	7	5	78	Claude Hipps	Pittsburgh Steelers	B
1952	9	2	99	Malcolm Cook	Chicago Cardinals	B
1952	15	9	178	John Burgamy	Detroit Lions	G
1952	21	5	246	Harry Babcock	Pittsburgh Steelers	E
1952	29	4	341	Tony Morocco	Philadelphia Eagles	B
1953	1	1	1	Harry Babcock	San Francisco 49ers	E
1953	2	4	17	Zeke Bratkowski	Chicago Bears	QB
1953	6	4	65	Art DeCarlo	Chicago Bears	B
1953	8	6	91	Lauren Hargrove	Green Bay Packers	B
1953	15	10	179	Johnny Carson	Cleveland Browns	E
1954	8	11	96	Charlie Harris	Cleveland Browns	B
1954	18	8	213	Sam Mrvos	Philadelphia Eagles	G
1954	20	10	239	Frank DePietro	San Francisco 49ers	B
1955	4	10	47	Joe O'Malley	Chicago Bears	E
1955	7	4	77	Bob Clemens	Green Bay Packers	B
1955	17	3	196	Don Shea	Washington Redskins	G
1955	28	12	337	Ed Tokus	Cleveland Browns	E
1956	23	1	266	Bob Garrard	Detroit Lions	B
1957	6	3	64	Roy Wilkins	Los Angeles Rams	E
1957	16	3	184	John Luck	Los Angeles Rams	T
1957	20	12	241	Laneair Roberts	New York Giants	E
1957	25	2	291	Jimmy Orr	Los Angeles Rams	B
1958	10	3	112	Theron Sapp	Philadelphia Eagles	B
1958	16	3	184	Mike Meatheringham	Philadelphia Eagles	T
1958	18	8	213	Dave Lloyd	Cleveland Browns	LB
1959	4	11	47	Dave Lloyd	Cleveland Browns	LB
1959	10	7	115	Riley Gunnels	Pittsburgh Steelers	T
1959	26	9	309	Bill Strumke	Los Angeles Rams	B
1960	3	1	25	Charley Britt	Los Angeles Rams	QB
1960	11	2	122	Bobby Towns	St. Louis Cardinals	B
1960	13	4	148	Bill Herron	Washington Redskins	E
1960	16	9	189	Larry Lancaster	Philadelphia Eagles	T
1960	17	4	196	Billy Roland	Washington Redskins	G
1960	19	7	223	Lloyd Roberts	Chicago Bears	T
1961	3	1	29	Fran Tarkenton	Minnesota Vikings	QB
1961	14	10	192	Bill Worrell	San Francisco 49ers	T
1962	2	13	27	Pete Case	Philadelphia Eagles	T
1962	12	14	168	Tom Pennington	Green Bay Packers	B
1962	15	1	197	Len Velia	Washington Redskins	T
1962	19	4	256	Paul Holmes	Dallas Cowboys	T
1963	16	9	219	Dick Kelly	Cleveland Browns	G
1964	4	1	43	Jim Wilson	San Francisco 49ers	G
1964	5	2	58	Mickey Babb	Philadelphia Eagles	E
1964	8	14	112	Larry Rakestraw	Chicago Bears	QB
1964	9	3	115	Len Hauss	Washington Redskins	C
1964	19	14	266	Jim Whitehead	Chicago Bears	T
1965	2	6	20	Ray Rissmiller	Philadelphia Eagles	T
1965	9	2	114	Wayne Swinford	San Francisco 49ers	RB
1966	7	6	101	George Patton	Washington Redskins	T
1966	7	7	102	Charley Arkwright	St. Louis Cardinals	T
1966	8	12	122	Doug McFalls	Chicago Bears	DB
1966	11	11	166	Preston Ridlehuber	San Francisco 49ers	RB
1966	18	5	265	Joe Burson	Washington Redskins	RB
1967	7	6	165	Frank Richter	Denver Broncos	G
1967	13	22	337	Randy Wheeler	Buffalo Bills	RB
1968	4	3	86	Edgar Chandler	Buffalo Bills	T
1968	8	2	194	Ray Jeffords	Atlanta Falcons	TE
1968	13	21	348	Terry Sellers	Cleveland Browns	DB
1968	17	15	450	Larry Kohn	New York Giants	TE
1969	1	11	11	Bill Stanfill	Miami Dolphins	DE
1969	9	3	211	Kent Lawrence	Philadelphia Eagles	WR
1969	11	5	265	Mark Stewart	Cincinnati Bengals	DB
1969	14	20	358	Jiggy Smaha	Cleveland Browns	DT
1970	4	14	92	Spike Jones	Houston Oilers	P
1970	7	3	159	Jake Scott	Miami Dolphins	DB
1971	14	12	350	Tommy Lyons	Denver Broncos	C
1972	1	8	8	Royce Smith	New Orleans Saints	G
1972	5	19	123	Mike Greene	San Francisco 49ers	LB
1972	13	3	315	Chuck Heard	New York Giants	DE
1972	15	10	374	Phil Sullivan	New York Jets	DB
1972	17	14	430	Tom Nash	Philadelphia Eagles	T
1973	14	3	341	Paul Fersen	New Orleans Saints	T
1974	5	4	108	Jim Cagle	Philadelphia Eagles	DT
1974	5	8	112	Andy Johnson	New England Patriots	RB
1974	9	6	214	Bob Burns	New York Jets	RB
1974	10	5	239	Sam Baker	New York Jets	G
1974	13	7	319	Jim Poulos	St. Louis Cardinals	RB
1975	4	6	84	Steve Taylor	Denver Broncos	DB
1975	4	16	94	Craig Hertwig	Detroit Lions	T
1975	6	11	141	Horace King	Detroit Lions	RB
1975	8	21	203	Barry Collier	San Diego Chargers	T
1975	13	12	324	Dan Spivey	New York Jets	DT
1975	16	23	413	Vernon Smith	Miami Dolphins	C
1975	17	1	417	David McKnight	Baltimore Colts	LB
1976	4	29	121	Richard Appleby	Tampa Bay Buccaneers	WR
1976	4	30	122	Randy Johnson	Seattle Seahawks	G
1976	5	30	154	Steve Wilson	Tampa Bay Buccaneers	T
1976	9	14	251	Glynn Harrison	San Diego Chargers	RB
1976	13	2	349	Andy Reid	Seattle Seahawks	RB
1977	4	6	90	Allan Leavitt	Atlanta Falcons	K
1977	4	19	103	Mike Wilson	Cincinnati Bengals	T
1977	8	3	198	Steve Davis	Houston Oilers	WR
1977	8	25	220	Ken Helms	Baltimore Colts	T
1977	9	4	227	Matt Robinson	New York Jets	QB
1977	9	12	235	Gene Washington	San Diego Chargers	WR
1977	11	13	292	Joel Parrish	Cincinnati Bengals	G
1978	4	12	96	George Collins	St. Louis Cardinals	G
1978	10	21	271	Ben Zambiasi	Chicago Bears	LB
1978	12	2	308	Kevin McLee	Tampa Bay Buccaneers	RB
1979	3	10	66	Willie McClendon	Chicago Bears	RB
1979	4	6	88	Ulysses Norris	Detroit Lions	TE
1979	12	6	309	Rick McBride	St. Louis Cardinals	LB
1980	2	4	32	Ray Donaldson	Baltimore Colts	C
1980	5	9	119	Jeff Pyburn	Buffalo Bills	DB
1981	3	24	80	Scott Woerner	Atlanta Falcons	DB
1981	6	1	139	Nat Hudson	New Orleans Saints	G
1981	6	8	146	Rex Robinson	Cincinnati Bengals	K
1981	11	26	302	Tim Morrison	Dallas Cowboys	G
1982	1	13	13	Lindsay Scott	New Orleans Saints	WR
1983	4	28	112	Jimmy Payne	Buffalo Bills	DE
1983	8	17	213	Norris Brown	Minnesota Vikings	TE
1984	3	12	68	Terry Hoage	New Orleans Saints	DB
1984	3	17	73	Guy McIntyre	San Francisco 49ers	G
1984	7	12	180	Daryll Jones	Green Bay Packers	DB
1984	7	18	186	Clarence Kay	Denver Broncos	TE
1984	8	11	207	Winford Hood	Denver Broncos	T
1984u	1	19	19	Freddie Gilbert	Denver Broncos	DE
1985	4	21	105	Kevin Butler	Chicago Bears	K
1985	5	2	114	Herschel Walker	Dallas Cowboys	RB
1985	9	20	244	Scott Williams	St. Louis Cardinals	TE
1985	11	6	286	Kevin Harris	Detroit Lions	DB
1985	12	6	314	Mike Weaver	Detroit Lions	G
1985	12	19	327	Jeff Sanchez	Pittsburgh Steelers	DB
1985	12	28	336	Donald Chumley	San Francisco 49ers	DT
1986	10	17	266	Peter Anderson	Indianapolis Colts	G
1986	12	17	322	Tony Flack	Dallas Cowboys	DB
1987	7	26	194	Wilbur Strozier	Denver Broncos	TE
1987	10	18	269	David McCluskey	Cincinnati Bengals	RB
1988	2	26	53	Lars Tate	Tampa Bay Buccaneers	RB
1988	12	20	325	John Brantley	Houston Oilers	LB
1989	1	7	7	Tim Worley	Pittsburgh Steelers	RB
1989	3	28	84	Keith Henderson	San Francisco 49ers	RB
1989	5	11	123	Richard Tardits	Phoenix Cardinals	LB
1989	6	6	145	Troy Sadowski	Atlanta Falcons	TE
1989	11	17	296	Wayne Johnson	Indianapolis Colts	QB
1989	12	17	324	Aaron Chubb	New England Patriots	LB
1990	1	22	22	Ben Smith	Philadelphia Eagles	DB
1990	1	24	24	Rodney Hampton	New York Giants	RB
1990	11	25	301	Bill Goldberg	Los Angeles Rams	DT
1991	3	8	63	Mo Lewis	New York Jets	LB
1991	4	15	98	John Kasay	Seattle Seahawks	K
1993	1	3	3	Garrison Hearst	Phoenix Cardinals	RB
1993	3	20	76	Andre Hastings	Pittsburgh Steelers	WR
1993	7	3	171	Alec Millen	New York Jets	T
1993	7	9	177	Todd Perterson	New York Giants	K
1994	1	14	14	Bernard Williams	Philadelphia Eagles	T
1994	4	15	118	Mitch Davis	Atlanta Falcons	LB
1994	7	10	204	Frank Harvey	Arizona Cardinals	RB
1995	3	20	84	Eric Zeier	Cleveland Browns	QB
1995	6	25	196	Terrell Davis	Denver Broncos	RB
1995	7	26	234	Carlos Yancy	New England Patriots	DB
1996	2	19	49	Randall Godfrey	Dallas Cowboys	LB
1996	4	4	99	Phillip Daniels	Seattle Seahawks	DE
1996	5	15	147	Whit Marshall	Philadelphia Eagles	LB
1996	7	42	251	Brice Hunter	Miami Dolphins	WR
1997	2	18	48	Adam Meadows	Indianapolis Colts	T
1997	4	30	126	Jermaine Smith	Green Bay Packers	DT
1997	7	28	229	Jason Ferguson	New York Jets	DT
1998	1	18	18	Robert Edwards	New England Patriots	RB
1998	3	31	92	Hines Ward	Pittsburgh Steelers	WR
1998	7	25	214	Brandon Tolbert	Jacksonville Jaguars	LB
1998	7	38	227	Antonio Fleming	Dallas Cowboys	G
1999	1	7	7	Champ Bailey	Washington Redskins	DB
1999	1	18	18	Matt Stinchcomb	Oakland Raiders	T
1999	2	3	34	Chris Terry	Carolina Panthers	T
1999	4	20	115	Antonio Cochran	Seattle Seahawks	DE
1999	4	32	127	Olandis Gary	Denver Broncos	RB
1999	6	13	182	Emarlos Leroy	Jacksonville Jaguars	DT
2000	7	13	219	Orantes Grant	Dallas Cowboys	LB
2000	7	26	232	Jeff Harris	Miami Dolphins	DB
2000	7	33	239	Patrick Pass	New England Patriots	RB
2001	1	6	6	Richard Seymour	New England Patriots	DT
2001	1	13	13	Marcus Stroud	Jacksonville Jaguars	DT
2001	2	8	39	Kendrell Bell	Pittsburgh Steelers	LB
2001	2	22	53	Quincy Carter	Dallas Cowboys	QB
2001	3	33	95	Jonas Jennings	Buffalo Bills	T
2001	4	6	101	Jamie Henderson	New York Jets	DB
2002	1	25	25	Charles Grant	New Orleans Saints	DE
2002	3	8	73	Will Witherspoon	Carolina Panthers	LB
2002	4	16	114	Randy McMichael	Miami Dolphins	TE
2002	4	22	120	Terreal Bierria	Seattle Seahawks	DB
2002	5	22	157	Jermaine Phillips	Tampa Bay Buccaneers	DB
2002	5	31	166	Verron Haynes	Pittsburgh Steelers	RB
2002	7	9	220	Josh Mallard	Indianapolis Colts	DE
2002	7	22	233	Tim Wansley	Tampa Bay Buccaneers	DB
2003	1	6	6	Johnathan Sullivan	New Orleans Saints	DT
2003	1	20	20	George Foster	Denver Broncos	T
2003	2	2	34	Boss Bailey	Detroit Lions	LB
2003	2	5	37	Jon Stinchcomb	New Orleans Saints	T
2003	3	13	77	Musa Smith	Baltimore Ravens	RB
2003	6	37	210	Tony Gilbert	Arizona Cardinals	LB
2003	7	28	242	J. T. Wall	Pittsburgh Steelers	RB
2004	1	32	32	Benjamin Watson	New England Patriots	TE
2004	2	27	59	Sean Jones	Cleveland Browns	DB
2004	4	21	117	Robert Geathers	Cincinnati Bengals	DE
2004	4	25	121	Bruce Thornton	Dallas Cowboys	DB
2005	1	14	14	Thomas Davis	Carolina Panthers	DB
2005	1	17	17	David Pollack	Cincinnati Bengals	DE
2005	2	3	35	Reggie Brown	Philadelphia Eagles	WR
2005	2	16	48	Odell Thurman	Cincinnati Bengals	LB
2005	3	21	85	David Greene	Seattle Seahawks	QB
2005	4	30	131	Fred Gibson	Pittsburgh Steelers	WR
2006	2	30	62	Tim Jennings	Indianapolis Colts	DB
2006	3	8	72	Leonard Pope	Arizona Cardinals	TE
2006	4	2	99	Max Jean-Gilles	Philadelphia Eagles	G
2006	5	17	149	Greg Blue	Minnesota Vikings	DB
2006	5	20	152	DeMario Minter	Cleveland Browns	DB
2006	6	27	196	Kedric Golston	Washington Redskins	DT
2006	7	15	223	D. J. Shockley	Atlanta Falcons	QB
2007	3	1	65	Quentin Moses	Oakland Raiders	DE
2007	3	20	83	Charles Johnson	Carolina Panthers	DE
2007	4	34	133	Martrez Milner	Atlanta Falcons	TE
2007	6	16	190	Ken Shackleford	St. Louis Rams	T
2007s	4	0	0	Paul Oliver	San Diego Chargers	DB
2008	5	26	161	Marcus Howard	Indianapolis Colts	LB
2008	6	6	172	Thomas Brown	Atlanta Falcons	RB
2008	7	15	222	Chester Adams	Chicago Bears	G
2008	7	28	235	Brandon Coutu	Seattle Seahawks	K
2009	1	1	1	Matthew Stafford	Detroit Lions	QB
2009	1	12	12	Knowshon Moreno	Denver Broncos	RB
2009	2	18	50	Mohamed Massaquoi	Cleveland Browns	WR
2009	3	22	86	Asher Allen	Minnesota Vikings	DB
2009	3	29	93	Corvey Irvin	Carolina Panthers	DT
2009	6	9	182	Jarius Wynn	Green Bay Packers	DE
2010	3	33	97	Rennie Curran	Tennessee Titans	LB
2010	4	22	120	Geno Atkins	Cincinnati Bengals	DT
2010	5	32	163	Reshad Jones	Miami Dolphins	DB
2010	7	36	243	Jeff Owens	Philadelphia Eagles	DT
2010	7	41	248	Kade Weston	New England Patriots	DE
2011	1	4	4	A. J. Green	Cincinnati Bengals	WR
2011	3	6	70	Justin Houston	Kansas City Chiefs	DE
2011	3	27	91	Akeem Dent	Atlanta Falcons	LB
2011	4	4	101	Clint Boling	Cincinnati Bengals	G
2011	4	10	107	Kris Durham	Seattle Seahawks	WR
2011	7	17	220	Shaun Chapas	Dallas Cowboys	FB
2012	2	9	41	Cordy Glenn	Buffalo Bills	T
2012	4	4	99	Ben Jones	Houston Texans	C
2012	4	21	116	Orson Charles	Cincinnati Bengals	TE
2012	4	28	123	Brandon Boykin	Philadelphia Eagles	DB
2012	6	5	175	Blair Walsh	Minnesota Vikings	K
2012	7	1	208	Justin Anderson	Indianapolis Colts	T
2012	7	29	236	DeAngelo Tyson	Baltimore Ravens	DE
2013	1	17	17	Jarvis Jones	Pittsburgh Steelers	LB
2013	1	30	30	Alec Ogletree	St. Louis Rams	LB
2013	3	20	82	John Jenkins	New Orleans Saints	DT
2013	3	22	84	Shawn Williams	Cincinnati Bengals	DB
2013	5	1	134	Sanders Commings	Kansas City Chiefs	DB
2013	5	28	161	Tavarres King	Denver Broncos	WR
2013	6	20	188	Cornelius Washington	Chicago Bears	LB
2013	6	23	191	Bacarri Rambo	Washington Redskins	DB
2014	5	15	155	Arthur Lynch	Miami Dolphins	TE
2014	5	23	163	Aaron Murray	Kansas City Chiefs	QB
2015	1	10	10	Todd Gurley	St. Louis Rams	RB
2015	3	12	76	Chris Conley	Kansas City Chiefs	WR
2015	4	19	118	Ramik Wilson	Kansas City Chiefs	LB
2015	5	31	167	Damian Swann	New Orleans Saints	DB
2015	6	31	207	Amarlo Herrera	Indianapolis Colts	LB
2016	1	9	9	Leonard Floyd	Chicago Bears	LB
2016	3	20	83	Jordan Jenkins	New York Jets	LB
2016	4	14	112	Malcolm Mitchell	New England Patriots	WR
2016	5	6	145	John Theus	San Francisco 49ers	T
2016	7	21	242	Keith Marshall	Washington Redskins	RB
2017	5	28	172	Isaiah McKenzie	Denver Broncos	WR
2018	1	8	8	Roquan Smith	Chicago Bears	LB
2018	1	23	23	Isaiah Wynn	New England Patriots	T
2018	1	31	31	Sony Michel	New England Patriots	RB
2018	2	3	35	Nick Chubb	Cleveland Browns	RB
2018	3	2	66	Lorenzo Carter	New York Giants	LB
2018	7	6	224	Javon Wims	Chicago Bears	WR
2019	1	30	30	Deandre Baker	New York Giants	DB
2019	2	24	56	Mecole Hardman	Kansas City Chiefs	WR
2019	4	24	126	Riley Ridley	Chicago Bears	WR
2019	5	30	168	D'Andre Walker	Tennessee Titans	LB
2019	6	6	179	Lamont Gaillard	Arizona Cardinals	C
2019	7	10	224	Isaac Nauta	Detroit Lions	TE
2019	7	23	237	Terry Godwin	Carolina Panthers	WR
2020	1	4	4	Andrew Thomas	New York Giants	T
2020	1	29	29	Isaiah Wilson	Tennessee Titans	T
2020	2	3	35	D'Andre Swift	Detroit Lions	RB
2020	4	5	111	Solomon Kindley	Miami Dolphins	G
2020	5	21	167	Jake Fromm	Buffalo Bills	QB
2020	6	11	190	Charlie Woerner	San Francisco 49ers	TE
2020	7	41	255	Tae Crowder	New York Giants	LB
2021	1	29	29	Eric Stokes	Green Bay Packers	DB
2021	2	1	33	Tyson Campbell	Jacksonville Jaguars	DB
2021	2	18	50	Azeez Ojulari	New York Giants	LB
2021	3	28	92	Monty Rice	Tennessee Titans	LB
2021	3	30	94	Ben Cleveland	Baltimore Ravens	G
2021	3	33	97	Tre' McKitty	Los Angeles Chargers	TE
2021	5	25	169	Richard LeCounte	Cleveland Browns	DB
2021	6	6	190	Trey Hill	Cincinnati Bengals	C
2021	7	13	241	Mark Webb	Los Angeles Chargers	DB
2022	1	1	1	Travon Walker	Jacksonville Jaguars	DE
2022	1	13	13	Jordan Davis	Philadelphia Eagles	DT
2022	1	22	22	Quay Walker	Green Bay Packers	LB
2022	1	28	28	Devonte Wyatt	Green Bay Packers	DT
2022	1	32	32	Lewis Cine	Minnesota Vikings	DB
2022	2	20	52	George Pickens	Pittsburgh Steelers	WR
2022	2	31	63	James Cook	Buffalo Bills	RB
2022	3	19	83	Nakobe Dean	Philadelphia Eagles	LB
2022	3	38	102	Channing Tindall	Miami Dolphins	LB
2022	4	17	122	Zamir White	Las Vegas Raiders	RB
2022	4	28	133	Jake Camarda	Tampa Bay Buccaneers	P
2022	6	11	190	Justin Shaffer	Atlanta Falcons	G
2022	6	16	195	Jamaree Salyer	Los Angeles Chargers	G
2022	6	33	212	Derion Kendrick	Los Angeles Rams	DB
2022	6	34	213	John FitzPatrick	Atlanta Falcons	TE
2023	1	9	9	Jalen Carter	Philadelphia Eagles	DT
2023	1	14	14	Broderick Jones	Pittsburgh Steelers	T
2023	1	30	30	Nolan Smith	Philadelphia Eagles	LB
2023	3	30	93	Darnell Washington	Pittsburgh Steelers	TE
2023	4	3	105	Kelee Ringo	Philadelphia Eagles	DB
2023	4	26	128	Stetson Bennett	Los Angeles Rams	QB
2023	5	35	170	Christopher Smith II	Las Vegas Raiders	DB
2023	5	38	173	Robert Beal Jr.	San Francisco 49ers	DE
2023	5	39	174	Warren McClendon	Los Angeles Rams	T
2023	7	20	237	Kenny McIntosh	Seattle Seahawks	RB
2024	1	13	13	Brock Bowers	Las Vegas Raiders	TE
2024	1	18	18	Amarius Mims	Cincinnati Bengals	T
2024	2	2	34	Ladd McConkey	Los Angeles Chargers	WR
2024	2	10	42	Kamari Lassiter	Houston Texans	DB
2024	2	26	58	Javon Bullard	Green Bay Packers	DB
2024	3	25	89	Tykee Smith	Tampa Bay Buccaneers	DB
2024	5	6	141	Sedrick Van Pran-Granger	Buffalo Bills	C
2024	6	21	197	Zion Logue	Atlanta Falcons	DT
2025	1	11	11	Mykel Williams	San Francisco 49ers	DE
2025	1	15	15	Jalon Walker	Atlanta Falcons	LB
2025	1	27	27	Malaki Starks	Baltimore Ravens	DB
2025	2	25	57	Tate Ratledge	Detroit Lions	G
2025	3	17	81	Dylan Fairchild	Cincinnati Bengals	G
2025	3	31	95	Jared Wilson	New England Patriots	C
2025	4	8	110	Arian Smith	New York Jets	WR
2025	4	12	114	Trevor Etienne	Carolina Panthers	RB
2025	5	1	139	Tyrion Ingram-Dawkins	Minnesota Vikings	DT
2025	5	23	161	Smael Mondon Jr.	Philadelphia Eagles	LB
2025	6	22	198	Warren Brinson	Green Bay Packers	DT
2025	7	14	230	Dan Jackson	Detroit Lions	DB
2025	7	28	244	Dominic Lovett	Detroit Lions	WR
2026	1	19	19	Monroe Freeling	Carolina Panthers	T
2026	2	10	42	Christen Miller	New Orleans Saints	DT
2026	2	21	53	CJ Allen	Indianapolis Colts	LB
2026	3	9	73	Oscar Delp	New Orleans Saints	TE
2026	3	15	79	Zachariah Branch	Atlanta Falcons	WR
2026	3	21	85	Daylen Everette	Pittsburgh Steelers	CB
2026	4	40	140	Colbie Young	Cincinnati Bengals	WR
2026	6	26	207	Micah Morris	Philadelphia Eagles	G

== Notes ==
Freddie Gilbert was drafted in the 1984 NFL Supplemental Draft.

== Notable undrafted players ==
Note: No drafts held before 1920

Debut year	Player name	Debut NFL/AFL team	Position	Notes
1965	Frank Lankewicz	Philadelphia Eagles	FB	—
1966	Pat Hodgson	Washington Redskins	WR	—
1968	Bob Etter	Atlanta Falcons	K	—
1977	Bucky Dilts	Denver Broncos	P	—
1980	Mike Garrett	Seattle Seahawks	P	—
1983	Dale Carver	Cleveland Browns	LB	—
1984	Freddie Gilbert	New England Patriots	LB	—
1987	Gary Moss	Atlanta Falcons	DB	—
1992	Arthur Marshall	Denver Broncos	WR	—
1993	Mack Strong	Seattle Seahawks	FB	—
1995	Hason Graham	New England Patriots	WR	—
1997	Charlie Clemons	St. Louis Rams	LB	—
1999	Larry Brown	San Diego Chargers	TE	—
1999	Kirby Smart	Indianapolis Colts	DB	—
1999	Jermaine Wiggins	New York Jets	TE	—
2000	Steve Herndon	Miami Dolphins	G	—
2001	Demetric Evans	Dallas Cowboys	DE	—
2002	Adrian Hollingshed	Green Bay Packers	LB	—
2003	Kevin Breedlove	San Diego Chargers	OL	—
2003	Chris Clemons	Washington Redskins	DE	—
2003	Terrence Edwards	Atlanta Falcons	WR	—
2006	Dennis Roland	Dallas Cowboys	T	—
2007	Tra Battle	San Diego Chargers	S	—
2007	Tony Taylor	Atlanta Falcons	LB	—
2009	Dannell Ellerbe	Baltimore Ravens	LB	—
2015	David Andrews	New England Patriots	C	—
2016	Marshall Morgan	Buffalo Bills	K	—
2018	John Atkins	New England Patriots	DT	—
2018	Dominick Sanders	Dallas Cowboys	S	—
2019	Nick Moore	New Orleans Saints	LS	—
2020	Rodrigo Blankenship	Indianapolis Colts	K	—
2021	Malik Herring	Kansas City Chiefs	DE	—
2023	Kearis Jackson	Tennessee Titans	WR	—
2023	Jack Podlesny	Minnesota Vikings	K	—
2024	Daijun Edwards	Pittsburgh Steelers	RB	—
2024	Marcus Rosemy-Jacksaint	Washington Commanders	WR	—
2025	Chaz Chambliss	Minnesota Vikings	LB	—
2025	Nazir Stackhouse	Green Bay Packers	DT	—
2025	Ben Yurosek	Minnesota Vikings	TE	—
2026	Dillon Bell	Minnesota Vikings	WR	—
2026	Beau Gardner	Chicago Bears	LS	—
2026	Cash Jones	Atlanta Falcons	RB	—
2026	Noah Thomas	Cincinnati Bengals	WR	—
2026	Brett Thorson	Minnesota Vikings	P	—
