= List of Baldwin Wallace Yellow Jackets in the NFL draft =

This is a list of Baldwin Wallace Yellow Jackets football players in the NFL draft.

== Key ==
B	Back	K	Kicker	NT	Nose tackle
C	Center	LB	Linebacker	FB	Fullback
DB	Defensive back	P	Punter	HB	Halfback
DE	Defensive end	QB	Quarterback	WR	Wide receiver
DT	Defensive tackle	RB	Running back	G	Guard
E	End	T	Offensive tackle	TE	Tight end

== Selections ==
Year	Round	Pick	Overall	Player	Team	Position
1937	7	10	70	Norm Schoen	Cleveland Rams	B
1938	11	4	94	Bill Krause	Pittsburgh Steelers	OT
1947	26	3	238	Don Mohr	Pittsburgh Steelers	E
1949	10	9	100	Bob Hecker	Chicago Cardinals	E
1949	25	5	246	Gene Degyanski	New York Giants	B
1950	21	1	262	Tom Phillips	Baltimore Colts	B
1951	6	10	72	Norb Hecker	Los Angeles Rams	E
1954	25	9	298	Dick Miller	Los Angeles Rams	B
1962	15	11	207	Tom Goosby	Cleveland Browns	G
1963	20	11	277	John Gregory	Chicago Bears	E
1964	11	5	145	Don Hyne	Detroit Lions	OT
1965	7	1	85	Jerry Roberts	Green Bay Packers	B
1972	8	17	199	Tom Graham	Los Angeles Rams	WR
