= Jiggy =

Jiggy may refer to:

== People ==
- Jiggy Manicad (born 1974), Filipino television journalist
- Jiggy Smaha (fl. 1968), American football player in the Canadian Football League

== Arts and entertainment ==
- Jiggy, a collectable item in the Banjo-Kazooie video game series
- "Jiggy", 2010 debut single by F.Cuz, a South Korean boy band
- "Jiggy (Whiz)", a 2021 single by British rapper ArrDee

== Fictional characters ==
- Jiggy McCue, protagonist of Michael Lawrence's series of children's books
- Jiggy Pepper, a recurring character in Tegami Bachi, a Japanese manga series
- Jiggy "Baseball" Cruz, a character in MPH, a British comic book series
- Jiggy Nye, the antagonist in the American Girl "Felicity" books

== Other uses ==
- jiggy, a derogatory term for a black person - see List of ethnic slurs and epithets by ethnicity

== See also ==
- Jig
