= Trevin Wallace =

American football player (born 2003)

No. 49 – New York Jets
- Position: Linebacker
- Roster status: Active

Personal information
- Born: February 22, 2003 (age 23); Jesup, Georgia, U.S.
- Listed height: 6 ft 1 in (1.85 m)
- Listed weight: 237 lb (108 kg)

Career information
- High school: Wayne County (GA)
- College: Kentucky (2021–2023)
- NFL draft: 2024: 3rd round, 72nd overall pick

Career history
- Carolina Panthers (2024–2025); New York Jets (2026–present)

Career NFL statistics as of Week 9, 2026
- Total tackles: 129
- Sacks: 3.0
- Forced fumbles: 2
- Fumble recoveries: 2
- Pass deflections: 4
- Stats at Pro Football Reference

Trevin Wallace (born February 22, 2003) is an American professional football linebacker for the New York Jets of the National Football League (NFL). He played college football for the Kentucky Wildcats.

== Early life ==
Wallace attended Wayne County High School in Jesup, Georgia. As a senior, he had 96 tackles and five sacks as a linebacker and 910 rushing yards on 78 carries and seven touchdowns as a running back. He initially committed to Boston College, but later changed his commitment to the University of Kentucky to play college football.

== College career ==
Wallace played at Kentucky from 2021 to 2023. As a true freshman in 2021, he started one of 12 games and recorded 32 tackles and two sacks. As a sophomore in 2022, Wallace started six of 12 games and had 54 tackles, 2.5 sacks and two interceptions. As a junior in 2023, he had 80 tackles, 5.5 sacks and one interception. After the season, Wallace entered the 2024 NFL draft.

== Professional career ==
Pre-draft measurables
Height	Weight	Arm length	Hand span	Wingspan	40-yard dash	10-yard split	20-yard split	Vertical jump	Broad jump	Bench press
6 ft 1 1/8 in (1.86 m)	237 lb (108 kg)	32 5/8 in (0.83 m)	9 1/8 in (0.23 m)	6 ft 7 1/8 in (2.01 m)	4.51 s	1.62 s	2.66 s	37.5 in (0.95 m)	10 ft 7 in (3.23 m)	20 reps
All values from NFL Combine/Pro Day

=== Carolina Panthers ===
Wallace was selected 72nd overall by the Carolina Panthers in the 2024 NFL draft. He made 13 appearances (eight starts) for Carolina during his rookie campaign, logging two forced fumbles, one fumble recovery, one sack, and 64 combined tackles.

Wallace operated as a starter in 2025, recording four pass deflections, two sacks, and 61 combined tackles across 12 games. On December 26, 2025, head coach Dave Canales announced that Wallace had undergone season-ending shoulder surgery.

On August 30, 2026, Wallace was waived by the Panthers as a part of final roster cuts.

=== New York Jets ===
On August 31, 2026, Wallace was claimed off of waivers by the New York Jets.

== NFL career statistics ==
Legend
**Bold**	Career high

=== Regular season ===
Year	Team	Games		Tackles					Interceptions						Fumbles				
Year	Team	GP	GS	Cmb	Solo	Ast	Sck	TFL	Int	Yds	Avg	Lng	TD	PD	FF	Fmb	FR	Yds	TD
2024	CAR	13	8	**64**	**36**	**28**	1.0	2	0	0	0.0	0	0	0	**2**	0	**1**	0	0
2025	CAR	12	12	61	**36**	25	**2.0**	**5**	0	0	0.0	0	0	**4**	0	0	0	0	0
Career		25	20	125	72	53	3.0	7	0	0	0.0	0	0	4	2	0	1	0	0
