= Ted Woods =

Canadian Football League halfback

Profile
- Position: Halfback

Personal information
- Born: c. 1940 (age 85–86)
- Listed height: 6 ft 1 in (1.85 m)
- Listed weight: 190 lb (86 kg)

Career information
- College: Colorado
- NFL draft: 1962: 5th round, 173rd overall pick

Career history
- 1964–1969: Calgary Stampeders

Ted Woods (born c. 1940) is a retired Canadian football player who played for the Calgary Stampeders. He played college football at the University of Colorado Boulder.

Woods was also an accomplished 400 metres sprinter. In his third ever 400 m race, he won the 1960 NCAA Division I Outdoor Track and Field Championships in a new NCAA record and world lead of 45.7 seconds.
