= Erwin C. Surrency =

- Born: May 14, 1924; Jesup, Georgia
- Died: November 8, 2012 (aged 88); Georgia
- Occupations: Historian; Author; Researcher; Law Professor
- Years active: 1950–2000

Erwin Campbell Surrency (1924–2012) was the founder of The American Journal of Legal History.

Surrency was born in Jesup, Georgia. He attended Georgia Peabody College and the University of Georgia. From 1950 to 1978, he was the Law librarian at Temple University, and was professor of law there from 1951 to 1972. From 1979 to 1995, he was the Law librarian and professor of law at the University of Georgia. Surrency was the author of several books. In 2012, Erwin C. Surrency was inducted into the American Association of Law Libraries Hall of Fame.
