= John Warren (punter) =

American football player (born 1960)

No. 5
- Position: Punter

Personal information
- Born: November 8, 1960 (age 65); Jesup, Georgia, U.S.
- Listed height: 6 ft 0 in (1.83 m)
- Listed weight: 207 lb (94 kg)

Career information
- High school: Wayne County (Jesup)
- College: Tennessee
- NFL draft: 1983: undrafted

Career history
- Dallas Cowboys (1983–1984)

Career NFL statistics
- Punts: 60
- Punt yards: 2,350
- Longest punt: 54
- Stats at Pro Football Reference

John Sheppard Warren (born November 8, 1960) is an American former professional football player who was a punter in the National Football League (NFL) for the Dallas Cowboys. He played college football for the Tennessee Volunteers.

== Early life ==
Warren attended Wayne County High School. He was considered the state's best punter. Additionally, he also was the team's placekicker.

He practiced baseball and was selected out of high school by the Cincinnati Reds.

== College career ==
After receiving Division I NCAA scholarships offers from different schools, he settled on the University of Tennessee. His best season came as a freshman, registering 52 punts for 2,106 yards and a 40.5-yard average.

As a sophomore, he tallied 58 punts for 2,327 yards and a 40.1-yard average.

In his last two years he was a backup behind All-American Jimmy Colquitt, with Warren handling the directional punts.

He finished his college career with 42 games appearances, 133 punts, 5,289 punt yards and a 39.8-yard average. He also practiced baseball.

== Professional career ==
Warren was signed as an undrafted free agent by the Dallas Cowboys after the 1983 NFL draft.

In the 1970s and early 1980s, the Cowboys had the luxury that they didn't need to carry a punter on their roster, because quarterback Danny White could perform that task at a high level. After he was injured in the 1982 NFC championship and placekicker Rafael Septién was forced to be the punter replacement, the team decided to carry Warren as the punter for the 1983 season. As a rookie, he shared punting duties with White. His best game was against the St. Louis Cardinals, when he averaged 46-yards on five punts, including a long of 54 yards. He was placed on the injured reserve list after suffering a right knee injury, while covering one of his punts in the eighth game against the Los Angeles Raiders. He was replaced with Jim Miller.

In 1984, he became part of a revolving door at the punter position, where he was released and signed on different times during the season after White was given his old punting job back. He appeared in 3 games, posting 21 punts for 799 yards and a 38-yard average.

On August 19, 1985, he was waived after being passed on the depth chart by Mike Saxon.
