= Wayne County School District (Georgia) =

School district in Georgia (U.S. state)

Address
- 555 Sunset Boulevard Jesup, Georgia, 31545-0432; United States
- Coordinates: 31.610939°N 81.905376°W

District information
- Grades: Pre-school - 12
- Superintendent: Dr. Jay Brinson
- Accreditations: Southern Association of Colleges and Schools; Georgia Accrediting Commission

Students and staff
- Enrollment: 5,256
- Faculty: 320

Other information
- Telephone: (912) 427-1000
- Fax: (912) 427-1004
- School Board Chairperson: Nicolas D. Ellis, District 5
- Website: www.wayne.k12.ga.us

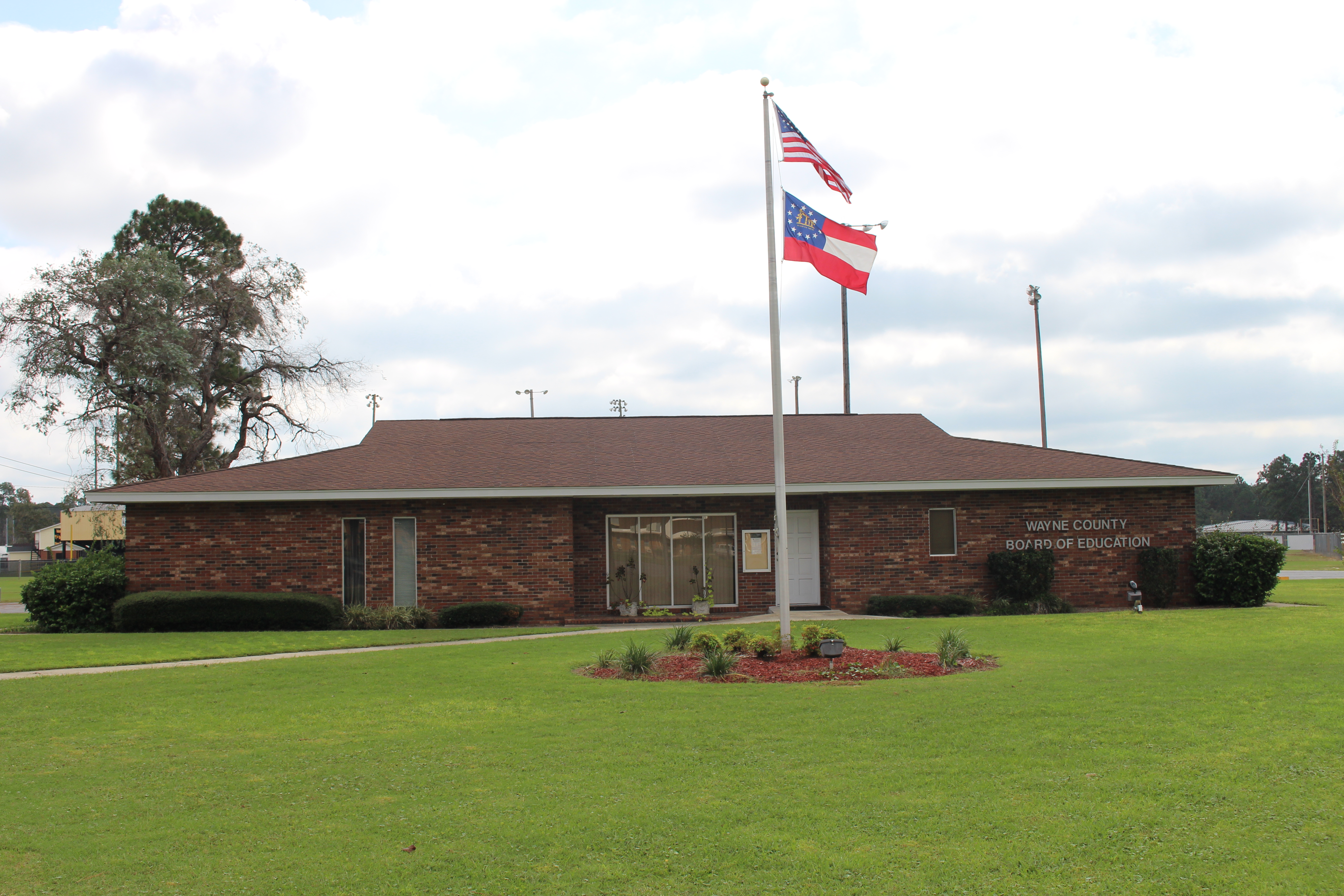
Wayne County School District headquarters

The Wayne County School District is a public school district in Wayne County, Georgia, United States, based in Jesup. It serves the communities of Jesup, Odum, and Screven.

The elementary schools in Jesup were formerly grade centers (in which different elementary school grades were divided into multiple campuses, so the district's entire student body went to the same schools), but by 2009-2010 they were scheduled to be K-5 neighborhood schools.

== Schools ==
The Wayne County School District has a pre-K center, five elementary schools, two middle schools, a high school, and an academy school.

=== Elementary schools ===
- James E. Bacon Elementary School, Jesup
- Jesup Elementary School, Jesup
- Martha R. Smith Elementary School, Jesup
- Odum Elementary School, Odum
- Screven Elementary School, Screven

=== Middle schools ===
- Arthur Williams Middle School, Jesup
- Martha Puckett Middle School, Jesup

=== Private schools ===
- Wayne Christian Academy, Jesup

=== High school ===
- Wayne County High School, Jesup

=== Other schools ===
- Thomas P. James
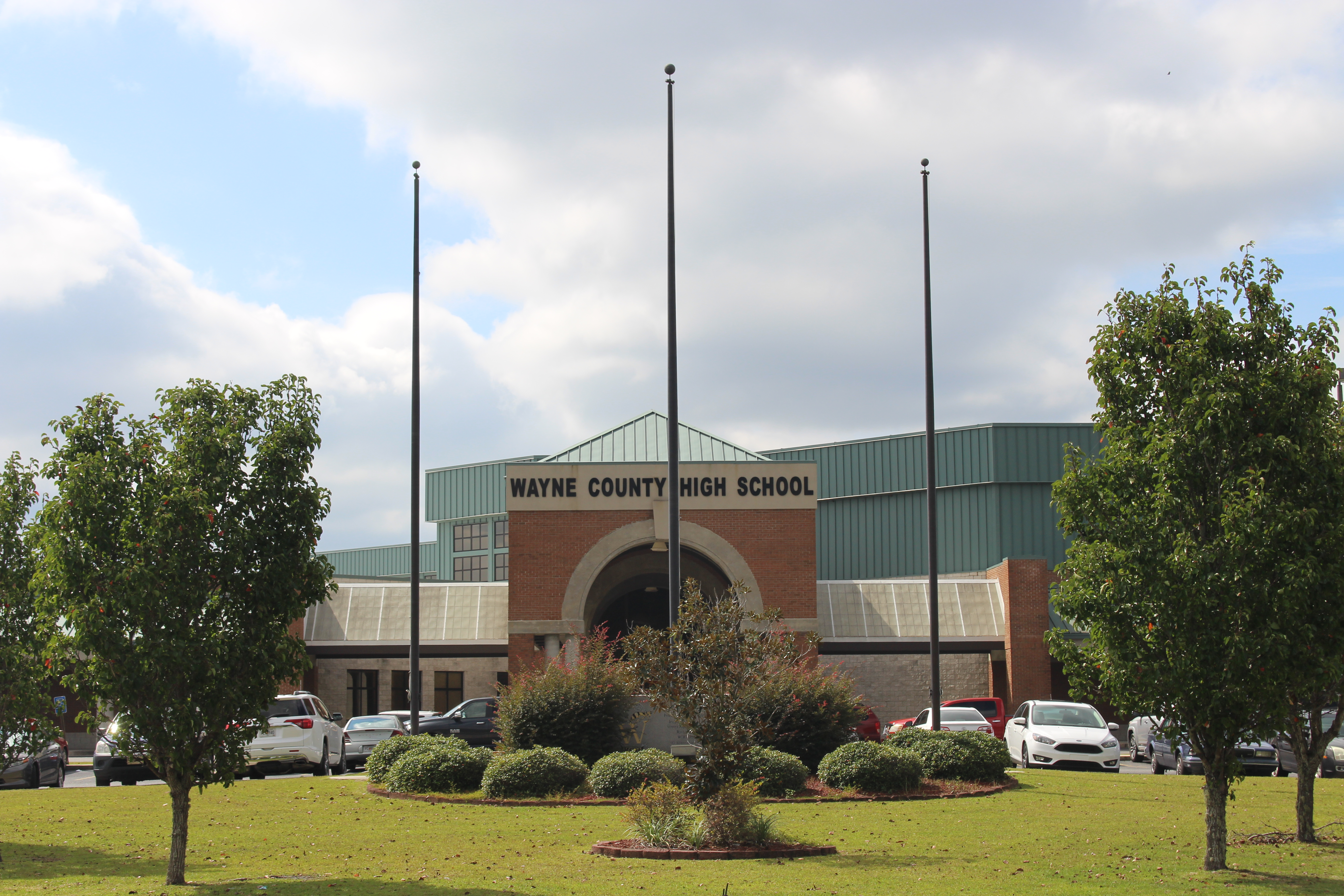
Wayne County High School

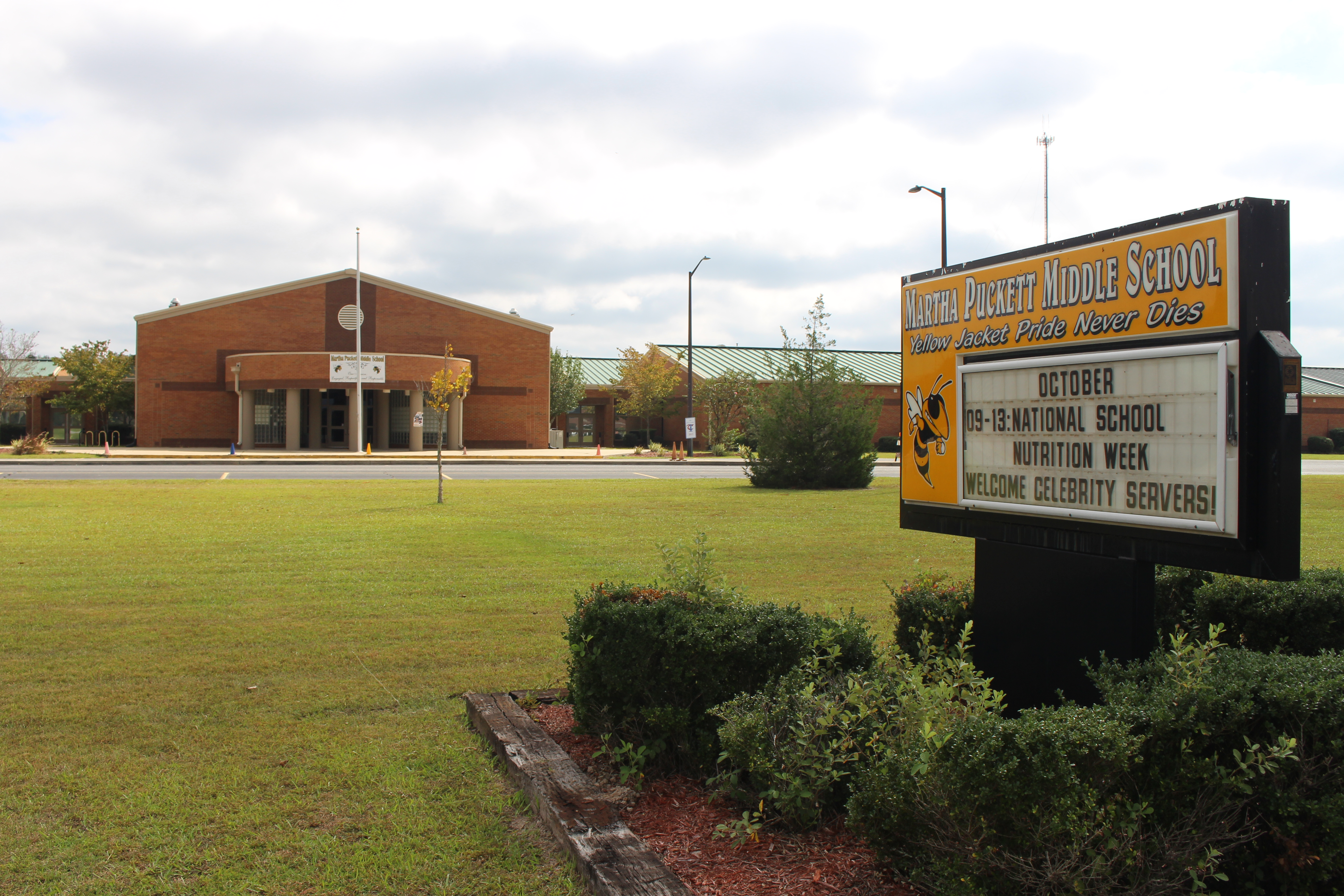
Martha Puckett Middle School

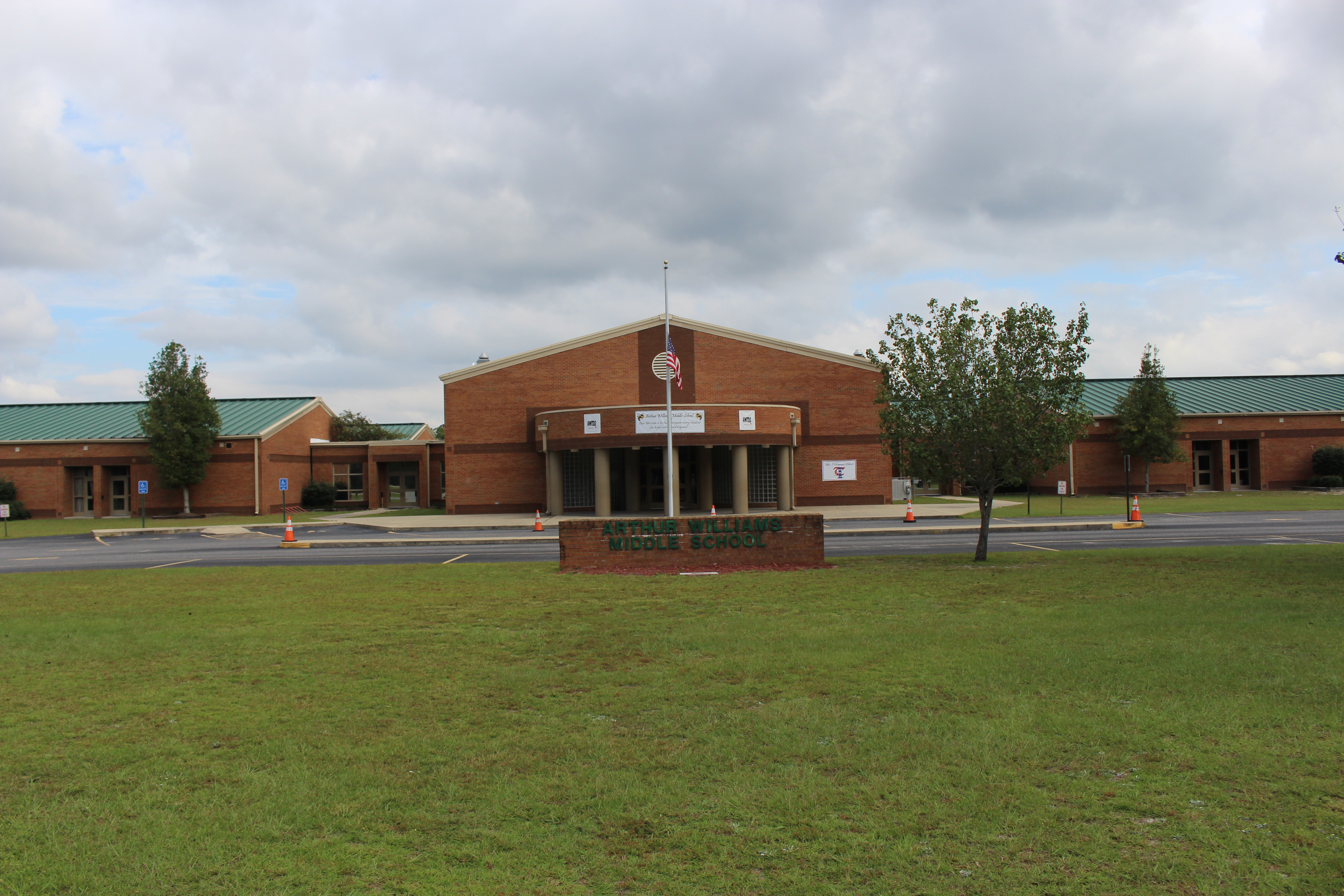
Arthur Williams Middle School

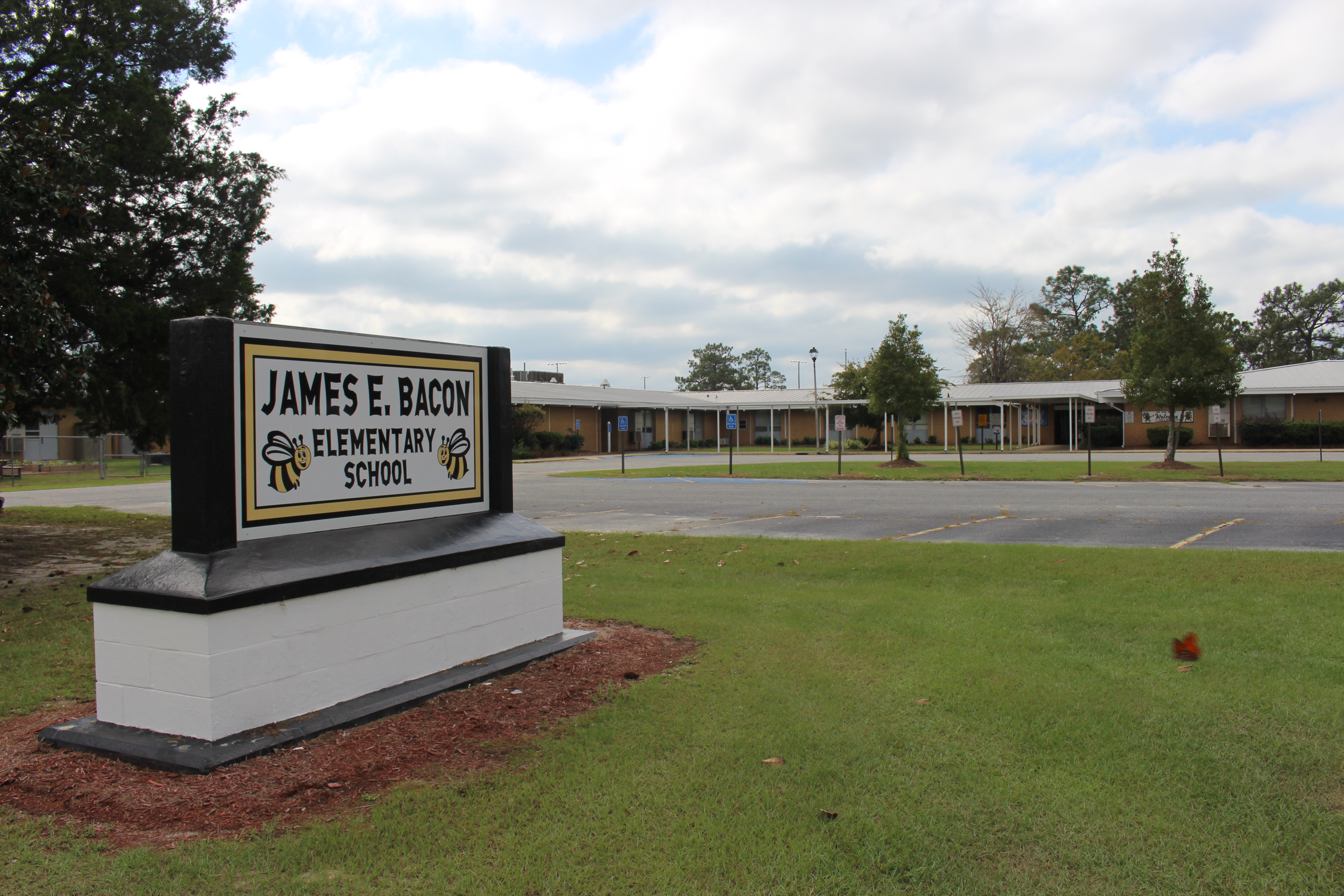
James E. Bacon Elementary School

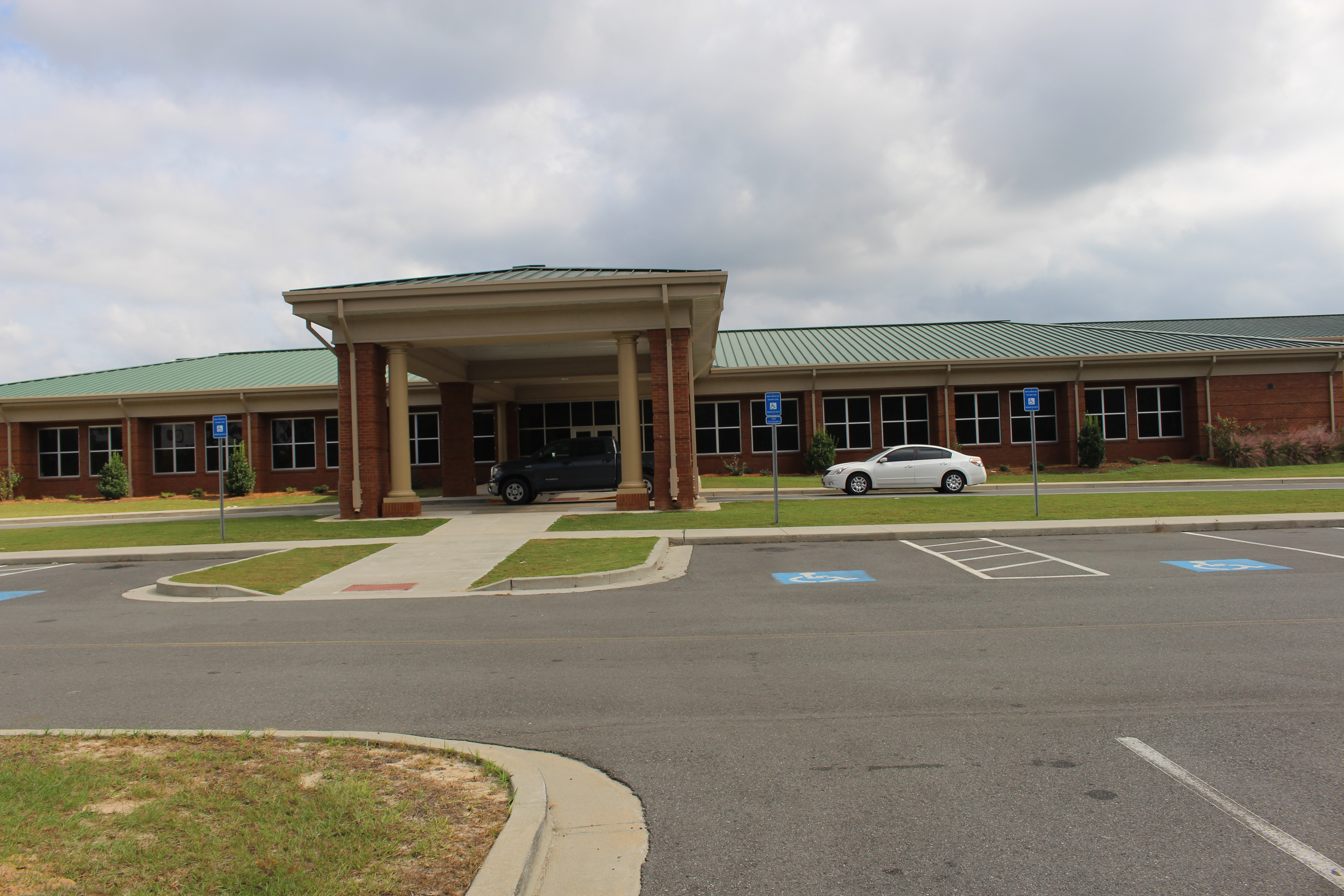
Jesup Elementary School

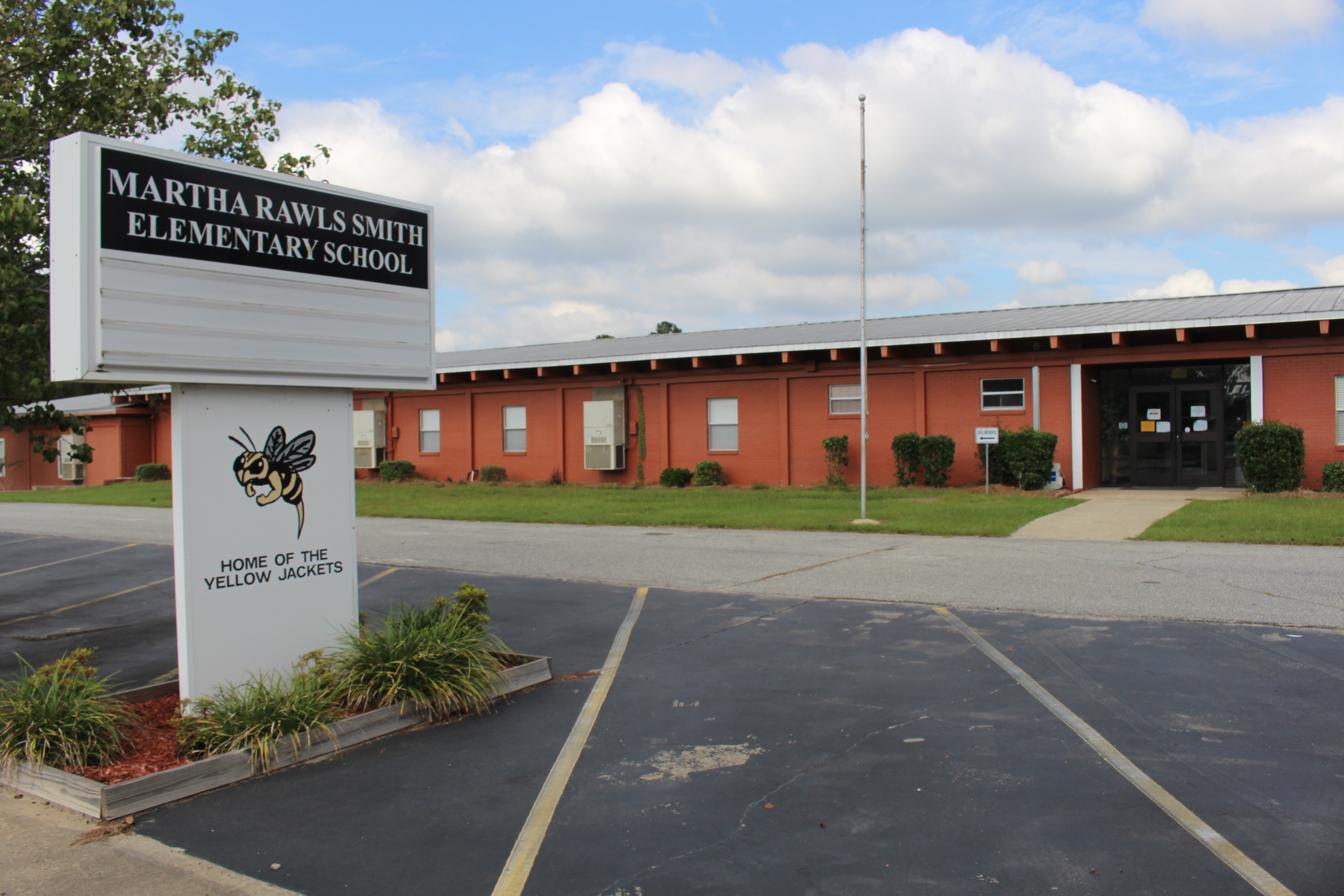
Martha Rawls Smith Elementary School
