= 1962 NFL draft =

National Football League draft

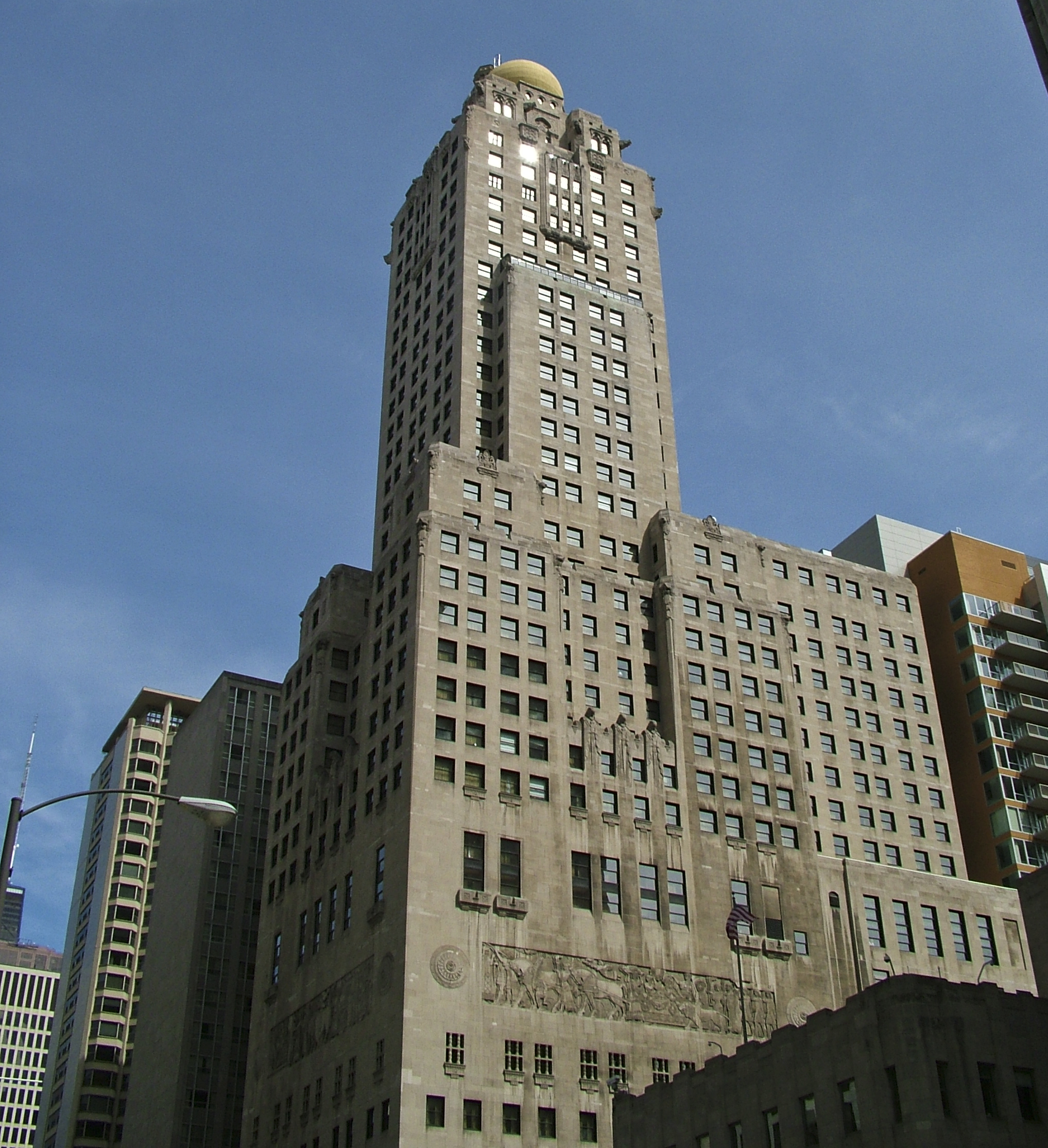
- The former Sheraton Hotel (draft location) photographed in 2003

General information
- Date: December 4, 1961
- Location: Sheraton Hotel & Towers in Chicago, IL

Overview
- 280 total selections in 20 rounds
- League: NFL
- First selection: Ernie Davis, back Washington Redskins
- Mr. Irrelevant: Mike Snodgrass, Center; Green Bay Packers
- Most selections (24): San Francisco 49ers
- Fewest selections (14): Minnesota Vikings
- Hall of Famers: 3: DT Merlin Olsen; WR Lance Alworth; C Mick Tingelhoff

The 1962 NFL draft was held on December 4, 1961, at the Sheraton Hotel in Chicago, Illinois.

The Washington Redskins used the first overall pick of the draft to select running back Ernie Davis, then subsequently traded him to the Cleveland Browns.

== Player selections ==
= Pro Bowler	= AFL All-Star	= Hall of Famer

=== Round 1 ===
Pick #	NFL team	Player	Position	College
1	Washington Redskins	Ernie Davis	Back	Syracuse
2	Los Angeles Rams ^{(from Minnesota Vikings via New York Giants)}	Roman Gabriel	Quarterback	North Carolina State
3	Los Angeles Rams	Merlin Olsen ^{HOF}	Defensive Tackle	Utah State
4	Cleveland Browns ^{(from Dallas Cowboys)}	Gary Collins	Wide receiver	Maryland
5	Pittsburgh Steelers	Bob Ferguson	Back	Ohio State
6	St. Louis Cardinals	Fate Echols	Tackle	Northwestern
7	Chicago Bears	Ronnie Bull	Back	Baylor
8	San Francisco 49ers	Lance Alworth ^{HOF}	Wide Receiver	Arkansas
9	Baltimore Colts	Wendell Harris	Back	LSU
10	Detroit Lions	John Hadl	Back	Kansas
11	Cleveland Browns	Leroy Jackson	Back	Western Illinois
12	St. Louis Cardinals ^{(from Philadelphia Eagles)}	Irv Goode	Guard	Kentucky
13	New York Giants	Jerry Hillebrand	Linebacker	Colorado
14	Green Bay Packers	Earl Gros	Back	LSU

- ^{HOF}: Member of the Pro Football Hall of Fame

=== Round 2 ===
Pick #	NFL team	Player	Position	College
15	Washington Redskins	Joe Hernandez	Back	Arizona
16	Los Angeles Rams	Joe Carollo	Tackle	Notre Dame
17	Cleveland Browns	Chuck Hinton	Tackle	North Carolina Central
18	Dallas Cowboys	Sonny Gibbs	Quarterback	TCU
19	St. Louis Cardinals	Bob Jackson	Running Back	NMSU
20	Chicago Bears	Clyde Brock	Tackle	Utah State
21	Chicago Bears	Bennie McRae	Back	Michigan
22	San Francisco 49ers	Ed Pine	Center	Utah
23	Baltimore Colts	Bill Saul	Linebacker	Penn State
24	Detroit Lions	Eddie Wilson	Quarterback	Arizona
25	Cleveland Browns	Sandy Stephens	Back	Minnesota
26	New York Giants	Bob Bill	Tackle	Notre Dame
27	Philadelphia Eagles	Pete Case	Tackle	Georgia
28	Green Bay Packers	Ed Blaine	Guard	Missouri

=== Round 3 ===
Pick #	NFL team	Player	Position	College
29	Washington Redskins	Bob Mitinger	End	Penn State
30	Minnesota Vikings	Bill Miller	End	Miami (FL)
31	Los Angeles Rams	John Meyers	Tackle	Washington
32	Chicago Bears	Jim Bates	End	USC
33	Los Angeles Rams	John Cornett	Tackle	Rice
34	St. Louis Cardinals	Chuck Bryant	End	Ohio State
35	Chicago Bears	Bill Hull	End	Wake Forest
36	San Francisco 49ers	Billy Ray Adams	Back	Mississippi
37	Baltimore Colts	Dan Sullivan	Tackle	Boston College
38	Detroit Lions	Bobby Thompson	Back	Arizona
39	Dallas Cowboys	Bobby Plummer	Tackle	TCU
40	Philadelphia Eagles	Pat Holmes	Tackle	Texas Tech
41	Green Bay Packers	Gary Barnes	End	Clemson
42	Cleveland Browns	John Furman	Quarterback	UTEP

=== Round 4 ===
Pick #	NFL team	Player	Position	College
43	Washington Redskins	Billy Neighbors	Tackle	Alabama
44	Los Angeles Rams	Art Perkins	Running Back	North Texas State
45	Minnesota Vikings	Roy Winston	Guard	LSU
46	San Francisco 49ers	Chuck Sieminski	Tackle	Penn State
47	St. Louis Cardinals	Roger Kochman	Running Back	Penn State
48	Detroit Lions	John Lomakoski	Tackle	Western Michigan
49	Chicago Bears	Jim Cadile	Tackle	San Jose State
50	San Francisco 49ers	Floyd Dean	Tackle	Florida
51	Baltimore Colts	Jim Dillard	Back	Oklahoma State
52	Detroit Lions	Larry Ferguson	Back	Iowa
53	Cleveland Browns	Stan Sczurek	Guard	Purdue
54	New York Giants	Glynn Griffing	Quarterback	Ole Miss
55	Philadelphia Eagles	Bill Byrne	Guard	Boston College
56	Green Bay Packers	Ron Gassert	Tackle	Virginia

=== Round 5 ===
Pick #	NFL team	Player	Position	College
57	Chicago Bears	Mack Burton	End	San José State
58	New York Giants	Bookie Bolin	Guard	Ole Miss
59	New York Giants	Curtis Miranda	Center	Florida A&M
60	Los Angeles Rams	Jim Smith	Tackle	Penn State
61	Baltimore Colts	Jerry Croft	Guard	Bowling Green
62	San Francisco 49ers	Ted Woods	Running Back	Colorado
63	Chicago Bears	Bill Tunnicliff	Running Back	Michigan
64	San Francisco 49ers	Mike Lind	Running Back	Notre Dame
65	Green Bay Packers	Chuck Morris	Back	Ole Miss
66	Detroit Lions	Dan Birdwell	Center	Houston
67	Cleveland Browns	Henry Rivera	Running Back	Oregon State
68	Los Angeles Rams	Ben Wilson	Running Back	USC
69	St. Louis Cardinals	Bill Rice	End	Alabama
70	Green Bay Packers	Jon Schopf	Guard	Michigan

=== Round 6 ===
Pick #	NFL team	Player	Position	College
71	San Francisco 49ers	Keith Luhnow	Back	Santa Ana
72	New York Giants	Bill Triplett	Back	Miami (OH)
73	Minnesota Vikings	Larry Bowie	Tackle	Purdue
74	Dallas Cowboys	Donnie Davis	End	Southern
75	St. Louis Cardinals	John Elwell	End	Purdue
76	San Francisco 49ers	Jerry Brown	Guard	Mississippi
77	Philadelphia Eagles	Gus Gonzales	Guard	Tulane
78	San Francisco 49ers	Bill Winter	Tackle	West Virginia
79	Green Bay Packers	John Sutro	Tackle	San José State
80	Detroit Lions	Mike Bundra	Tackle	USC
81	Cleveland Browns	Sam Tidmore	End	Ohio State
82	Dallas Cowboys	George Andrie	End	Marquette
83	Philadelphia Eagles	John McGeever	Running Back	Auburn
84	Green Bay Packers	Oscar Donahue	End	San José State

=== Round 7 ===
Pick #	NFL team	Player	Position	College
85	Washington Redskins	Bert Coan	Running Back	Kansas
86	Philadelphia Eagles	Jim Perkins	Tackle	Colorado
87	Los Angeles Rams	Sherwyn Thorson	Guard	Iowa
88	Los Angeles Rams	Jim Bakken	Quarterback	Wisconsin
89	Pittsburgh Steelers	Jack Collins	Running Back	Texas
90	St. Louis Cardinals	Bill Kirchiro	Guard	Maryland
91	Chicago Bears	Ed O'Bradovich	End	Illinois
92	San Francisco 49ers	John Burrell	End	Rice
93	Baltimore Colts	Fred Miller	Tackle	LSU
94	Detroit Lions	Tom Hall	End	Minnesota
95	Cleveland Browns	John Havlicek	Wide Receiver	Ohio State
96	Philadelphia Eagles	Frank Budd	Wide Receiver	Villanova
97	New York Giants	Ken Byers	Tackle	Cincinnati
98	Green Bay Packers	Gary Cutsinger	Tackle	Oklahoma State

=== Round 8 ===
Pick #	NFL team	Player	Position	College
99	Washington Redskins	Ron Hatcher	Running back	Michigan State
100	Los Angeles Rams	Dick Farris	Guard	North Texas State
101	Minnesota Vikings	Paul White	Running back	Florida
102	Dallas Cowboys	Ken Tureaud	Back	Michigan
103	St. Louis Cardinals	George Gross	Tackle	Auburn
104	Pittsburgh Steelers	Gary Ballman	Back	Michigan State
105	Chicago Bears	Ed Reynolds	Tackle	Tulane
106	San Francisco 49ers	Jim Vollenweider	Back	Miami (FL)
107	Baltimore Colts	Pete Brokaw	Back	Syracuse
108	Detroit Lions	Murdock Hopper	Tackle	Houston
109	Detroit Lions	Frank Imperiale	Guard	Southern Illinois
110	Chicago Bears	Larry Onesti	Center	Northwestern
111	Philadelphia Eagles	Ralph "Catfish" Smith	End	Mississippi
112	Green Bay Packers	Jim Tullis	Back	Florida A&M

=== Round 9 ===
Pick #	NFL team	Player	Position	College
113	Washington Redskins	Dave Viti	End	Boston University
114	Minnesota Vikings	Marshall Shirk	Tackle	UCLA
115	Los Angeles Rams	Ike Lassiter	Tackle	St. Augustine's
116	Baltimore Colts	Roy Walker	Running back	Purdue
117	Pittsburgh Steelers	John Powers	End	Notre Dame
118	St. Louis Cardinals	Wilburn Hollis	Quarterback	Iowa
119	Chicago Bears	Kelton Winston	Running back	Wiley
120	San Francisco 49ers	Jim Roberts	Tackle	Mississippi
121	Baltimore Colts	Walt Rappold	Quarterback	Duke
122	Detroit Lions	Todd Grant	Center	Michigan
123	Cleveland Browns	Chuck Dickerson	Tackle	Illinois
124	Philadelphia Eagles	Bob Butler	Tackle	Kentucky
125	New York Giants	Reed Bohovich	Tackle	Lehigh
126	Green Bay Packers	Peter Schenck	Back	Washington State

=== Round 10 ===
Pick #	NFL team	Player	Position	College
127	Washington Redskins	John Childress	Guard	Arkansas
128	Los Angeles Rams	Jim Norris	Tackle	Houston
129	Cleveland Browns	Jerry Goerlitz	Center	Northern Michigan
130	Dallas Cowboys	John Longmeyer	Guard	Southern Illinois
131	St. Louis Cardinals	George Fracovitch	Guard	Syracuse
132	Pittsburgh Steelers	Larry Vignali	Guard	Pittsburgh
133	Chicago Bears	LeRoy Weaver	Back	Adams State
134	San Francisco 49ers	Regis Coustillac	Guard	Pittsburgh
135	Baltimore Colts	Fred Moore	Tackle	Memphis State
136	Detroit Lions	Jerry Archer	Center	Pittsburg State
137	Cleveland Browns	Albert White	Back	Capital
138	New York Giants	J.R. Williams	Center	Fresno State
139	Philadelphia Eagles	Jim Skaggs	Guard	Washington
140	Green Bay Packers	Gale Weidner	Quarterback	Colorado

=== Round 11 ===
Pick #	NFL team	Player	Position	College
141	Washington Redskins	Carl Palazzo	Tackle	Adams State
142	Cleveland Browns	Ronnie Meyers	End	Villanova
143	Los Angeles Rams	Bert Wilder	Tackle	North Carolina State
144	Dallas Cowboys	Larry Hudas	End	Michigan State
145	Pittsburgh Steelers	Bob Wills	End	California
146	St. Louis Cardinals	James Saxton	Back	Texas
147	Chicago Bears	Jerry Robinson	Running back	Grambling
148	San Francisco 49ers	Larry Jepson	Center	Furman
149	Baltimore Colts	Scott Tyler	Back	Miami (OH)
150	Detroit Lions	Karl Anderson	Tackle	Bowling Green
151	Cleveland Browns	Clifton McNeil	End	Grambling
152	Philadelphia Eagles	George Horne	Tackle	Brigham Young
153	New York Giants	Dave Bishop	Back	Connecticut
154	Green Bay Packers	Jim Thrush	Tackle	Xavier

=== Round 12 ===
Pick #	NFL team	Player	Position	College
155	Washington Redskins	Terry Terrebonne	Running back	Tulane
156	Los Angeles Rams	Marv Marinovich	Tackle	USC
157	Minnesota Vikings	Gary Fallon	Running back	Syracuse
158	Green Bay Packers	Joe Thorne	Back	South Dakota State
159	St. Louis Cardinals	Bob O'Billovich	Back	Montana
160	Pittsburgh Steelers	Sam Mudie	Back	Rutgers
161	Chicago Bears	Bill Watts	Tackle	Miami (FL)
162	San Francisco 49ers	Milton McPike	End	Northeast Missouri State
163	Baltimore Colts	Bake Turner	Running back	Texas Tech
164	Detroit Lions	Gale Sprute	Center	Winona State
165	Cleveland Browns	Ted Stute	End	Ohio
166	New York Giants	Al Gursky	Running back	Penn State
167	Philadelphia Eagles	Larry Thompson	Center	Tulane
168	Green Bay Packers	Tom Pennington	Back	Georgia

=== Round 13 ===
Pick #	NFL team	Player	Position	College
169	Washington Redskins	Bill Whisler	End	Iowa
170	Minnesota Vikings	Roger Van Cleef	Tackle	Southwestern Oklahoma
171	Los Angeles Rams	Bob Fearnside	Running back	Bowling Green
172	Dallas Cowboys	Bob Moses	End	Texas
173	Pittsburgh Steelers	Dave Woodward	Tackle	Auburn
174	St. Louis Cardinals	Bill Diamond	Guard	Miami (FL)
175	Chicago Bears	Joe Perkowski	Back	Notre Dame
176	San Francisco 49ers	George Pierovich	Back	California
177	Baltimore Colts	Charles Holmes	Running back	Maryland-Eastern Shore
178	Detroit Lions	Sherlock Knight	Tackle	Central State (OH)
179	Cleveland Browns	Frank Gardner	Tackle	North Carolina Central
180	Philadelphia Eagles	George McKinney	Back	Arkansas
181	New York Giants	Billy Joe Booth	Tackle	Louisiana State
182	Green Bay Packers	Tom Kepner	Tackle	Villanova

=== Round 14 ===
Pick #	NFL team	Player	Position	College
183	Washington Redskins	Jim Costen	Running back	South Carolina
184	Los Angeles Rams	Gary Henson	End	Colorado
185	Minnesota Vikings	Patrick Russ	Tackle	Purdue
186	Dallas Cowboys	Harold Hays	Guard	Southern Mississippi
187	St. Louis Cardinals	George Mans	End	Michigan
188	Pittsburgh Steelers	Jim Whitaker	End	Nevada-Reno
189	Chicago Bears	Andy Von Sonn	Center	UCLA
190	San Francisco 49ers	Dick Easterly	Back	Syracuse
191	Baltimore Colts	Stinson Jones	Back	Virginia Military Inst
192	Detroit Lions	Jim Davidson	Back	Maryland
193	Cleveland Browns	Jim Shorter	Back	Detroit
194	New York Giants	Greg Mather	End	Navy
195	Philadelphia Eagles	Jim Schwab	End	Penn State
196	Green Bay Packers	Ernie Green	Back	Louisville

=== Round 15 ===
Pick #	NFL team	Player	Position	College
197	Washington Redskins	Len Vella	Tackle	Georgia
198	Minnesota Vikings	Larry Guilford	End	Pacific
199	Los Angeles Rams	Walter Nikirk	Tackle	Houston
200	Dallas Cowboys	Guy Reese	Tackle	Southern Methodist
201	Pittsburgh Steelers	Vern Hatch	End	North Carolina Central
202	St. Louis Cardinals	Dick Barlund	End	Maryland
203	Chicago Bears	Kent Martin	Tackle	Wake Forest
204	San Francisco 49ers	Ray Osborne	Tackle	Mississippi State
205	Baltimore Colts	Joe Monte	Guard	Furman
206	Detroit Lions	Dick Broadbent	End	Delaware
207	Cleveland Browns	Tom Goosby	Guard	Baldwin–Wallace
208	Philadelphia Eagles	Mike Woulfe	Guard	Colorado
209	New York Giants	Joe Taylor	Running back	North Carolina A&T
210	Green Bay Packers	Roger Holdinsky	Back	West Virginia

=== Round 16 ===
Pick #	NFL team	Player	Position	College
211	Washington Redskins	Tommy Brooker	End	Alabama
212	Los Angeles Rams	Ron Skufca	Tackle	Purdue
213	Minnesota Vikings	John Contoulis	Tackle	Connecticut
214	Dallas Cowboys	Bob Johnston	Tackle	Rice
215	St. Louis Cardinals	Bill Wegener	Guard	Missouri
216	Pittsburgh Steelers	Bobby Ply	Back	Baylor
217	Chicago Bears	John Nelson	Center	Xavier
218	San Francisco 49ers	Ron Frank	Tackle	South Dakota State
219	Baltimore Colts	Ray Abruzzese	Running back	Alabama
220	Detroit Lions	Tom Sestak	End	McNeese State
221	Cleveland Browns	Dennis Biodrowski	End	Memphis State
222	New York Giants	Roger Johnson	Running back	Oregon State
223	Philadelphia Eagles	Jerry Mazzanti	Tackle	Arkansas
224	Green Bay Packers	Jimmy Field	Back	Louisiana State

=== Round 17 ===
Pick #	NFL team	Player	Position	College
225	Washington Redskins	Alan Miller	Guard	Ohio
226	Minnesota Vikings	Ron Staley	End	Wisconsin
227	Los Angeles Rams	Dave Steadman	Tackle	Georgia Tech
228	Dallas Cowboys	Ray Jacobs	Tackle	Howard Payne
229	Pittsburgh Steelers	Nat Tucker	Back	Florida A&M
230	St. Louis Cardinals	Don Kasso	Running back	Oregon State
231	Chicago Bears	Glenn Glass	Running back	Tennessee
232	San Francisco 49ers	Wally Foltz	End	De Pauw
233	Baltimore Colts	Bill Knocke	Running back	Fresno State
234	Detroit Lions	Rucker Wickline	Center	Marshall
235	Cleveland Browns	Herbert Harlan	End	Baylor
236	Philadelphia Eagles	Mike Martin	Tackle	Washington State
237	New York Giants	Ken Schaffer	Tackle	Marquette
238	Green Bay Packers	Buck Buchanan	Tackle	Grambling

=== Round 18 ===
Pick #	NFL team	Player	Position	College
239	Washington Redskins	Carl Charon	Back	Michigan State
240	Los Angeles Rams	Charlie Furlow	Quarterback	Mississippi State
241	Minnesota Vikings	Junior Hawthorne	Tackle	Kentucky
242	Dallas Cowboys	Dave Cloutier	Back	Maine
243	St. Louis Cardinals	Don Donatelli	Center	Florida State
244	Pittsburgh Steelers	Ferrell Yarbrough	Tackle	Northwestern State (LA)
245	Chicago Bears	Tommy Neck	Back	Louisiana State
246	San Francisco 49ers	Gary Brown	Tackle	Illinois
247	Baltimore Colts	Mel Rideout	Quarterback	Richmond
248	Detroit Lions	Joe Zuger	Quarterback	Arizona State
249	Cleveland Browns	Sonny Bishop	Guard	Fresno State
250	New York Giants	Bill Winter	Running back	St. Olaf
251	Philadelphia Eagles	Tom Larscheid	Back	Utah State
252	Green Bay Packers	Bob Joiner	Quarterback	Presbyterian

=== Round 19 ===
Pick #	NFL team	Player	Position	College
253	Washington Redskins	Claude Crabb	Back	Colorado
254	Minnesota Vikings	Tomy Minteer	Back	Baylor
255	Los Angeles Rams	Gerard Barto	Tackle	Drake
256	Dallas Cowboys	Paul Holmes	Tackle	Georgia
257	Pittsburgh Steelers	John Kuprok	End	Pittsburgh
258	St. Louis Cardinals	Don Smith	Back	Langston
259	Chicago Bears	Bill Kellum	Tackle	Tulane
260	San Francisco 49ers	Robert Burton, Sr.	Tackle	Murray State
261	Baltimore Colts	Fred Gillett	Back	Cal State-Los Angeles
262	Detroit Lions	Jim Bernhardt	Tackle	Linfield
263	Cleveland Browns	Jon Anabo	Quarterback	Fresno State
264	Philadelphia Eagles	Harold Ericksen	Guard	Georgia Tech
265	New York Giants	Bob Stem	Center	Syracuse
266	Green Bay Packers	Jerry Scattini	Back	California

=== Round 20 ===
Pick #	NFL team	Player	Position	College
267	Washington Redskins	Ed Trancyier	Quarterback	Florida State
268	Los Angeles Rams	Foster Andersen	Tackle	UCLA
269	Minnesota Vikings	Terry Cagaanan	Running Back	Utah State
270	Dallas Cowboys	Amos Bullocks	Back	Southern Illinois
271	St. Louis Cardinals	Judge Dickson	Back	Minnesota
272	Pittsburgh Steelers	John Knight	Back	Valparaiso
273	Chicago Bears	Jack Roberts	Tackle	Ohio State
274	San Francisco 49ers	Roger McFarland	Back	Kansas
275	Baltimore Colts	Herm McKee	Back	Washington State
276	Detroit Lions	Bob Brown	End	Michigan
277	Cleveland Browns	Paul Flatley	Back	Northwestern
278	New York Giants	Jim Moss	Tackle	South Carolina
279	Philadelphia Eagles	Ron Turner	End	Wichita State
280	Green Bay Packers	Mike Snodgrass	Center	Western Michigan

= Pro Bowler	= AFL All-Star	= Hall of Famer

== Hall of Famers ==
- Lance Alworth, wide receiver from Arkansas taken 1st round 8th overall by the San Francisco 49ers, but signed with the AFL San Diego Chargers.

Inducted: Professional Football Hall of Fame class of 1978.

- Merlin Olsen, defensive tackle from Utah State taken 1st round 3rd overall by the Los Angeles Rams.

Inducted: Professional Football Hall of Fame class of 1982.

- Mick Tingelhoff, center from Nebraska undrafted and signed by the Minnesota Vikings.

Inducted: Professional Football Hall of Fame class of 2015.

== Notable undrafted players ==
^{†}	= Pro Bowler	‡	= Hall of Famer

Original NFL team	Player	Pos.	College	Notes
Dallas Cowboys	Mike Gaechter	S	Oregon	
Dallas Cowboys	Cornell Green ^{†}	CB	Utah State	
Dallas Cowboys	Dave Manders ^{†}	LB	Michigan State	
Green Bay Packers	Howie Williams	S	Howard	
Minnesota Vikings	John McCormick	QB	UMass	
Minnesota Vikings	Mick Tingelhoff^{‡}	C	Nebraska	
St. Louis Cardinals	Garland Boyette ^{†}	LB	Grambling State	

== See also ==
- 1962 American Football League draft
