= Bill Byrne (American football) =

American football player (1940–2021)

No. 66
- Position: Guard

Personal information
- Born: November 19, 1940; New York, New York, U.S.
- Died: June 23, 2021 (aged 80); Atlanta, Georgia, U.S.
- Listed height: 6 ft 0 in (1.83 m)
- Listed weight: 240 lb (109 kg)

Career information
- High school: Montclair (Montclair, New Jersey)
- College: Boston College
- NFL draft: 1962: 4th round, 55th overall pick

Career history

Playing
- Philadelphia Eagles (1962–1963); Cleveland Browns (1965)*; Lowell Giants (1967)
- * Offseason or practice squad member only

Coaching
- Lowell Giants (1967) Assistant coach; Lowell Giants (1968) Line coach

Career NFL statistics
- Games played: 12
- Games started: 3
- Stats at Pro Football Reference

William Joseph Byrne (November 19, 1940 – June 23, 2021) was an American football guard. He played professional football for the Philadelphia Eagles of the National Football League (NFL).

== Early life ==
Byrne was born in New York City in 1940. Raised in Montclair, New Jersey, he played prep football at Montclair High School, leading a team that lost only one game in his final two seasons. He played college football at Boston College from 1959 to 1961.

== Career ==
He was drafted by the Philadelphia Eagles in the fourth round (55th overall pick) of the 1962 NFL draft. Despite having a matching offer from the Dallas Texans of the American Football League, he signed with the Eagles in December 1961. He was the lone rookie slated to play in an early exhibition game in 1962, but he sustained a slipped disc in a warmup prior to the game. He missed the entire 1962 season due to the injury, and he was injured again during a pre-season game in 1963, this time injuring both his back and his knee. He was released by the Eagles at the start of the 1963 season but then recalled to the team. He appeared in 12 games with the Eagles during the 1963 season. He returned to the Eagles in 1964, but was cut at the end of August.

== Death ==
Byrne died in June 2021 at age 80 in Atlanta.
