= Carl Charon =

American football player (born 1940)

No. 43
- Positions: Defensive back, Fullback

Personal information
- Born: March 17, 1940 (age 86); Boyne City, Michigan, U.S.
- Listed height: 5 ft 10 in (1.78 m)
- Listed weight: 202 lb (92 kg)

Career information
- High school: Boyne City
- College: Michigan State
- NFL draft: 1962: 18th round, 239th overall pick

Career history
- Buffalo Bills (1962-1963); Norfolk Neptunes (1965)

Career AFL statistics
- Interceptions: 7
- Total touchdowns: 3
- Sacks: 2
- Stats at Pro Football Reference

Carl Henry Charon (born March 17, 1940) is an American former football player and coach. He played professionally for the Buffalo Bills of the American Football League (AFL).

Charon was born in 1940 in Boyne City, Michigan, and attended Boyne City High School.

He played college football for the Michigan State Spartans from 1959 to 1961.

He was selected by the Washington Redskins in the 18th round (239th overall pick) of the 1962 NFL draft. He instead played in the AFL for the Buffalo Bills in 1962 and 1963. He appeared in 26 AFL games and led the league in 1962 with two non-offensive touchdowns. He also played for the Norfolk Neptunes of the Continental Football League in 1965.

After his playing career, Charon worked as a high school football coach and physical education teacher in Gladwin, Michigan. He compiled a 123-77 record, was named Regional Coach of the Year by the Michigan High School Football Coaches Association (MHSFCA) in 1979, 1983, and 1985. He was inducted into the MHSFCA Hall of Fame in 1994.
