= Bill Winter (New York Giants) =

American football player (1940–1995)

No. 31
- Position: Linebacker

Personal information
- Born: January 28, 1940; Milbank, South Dakota, U.S.
- Died: May 29, 1995 (aged 55); Carlton County, Minnesota, U.S.
- Listed height: 6 ft 3 in (1.91 m)
- Listed weight: 220 lb (100 kg)

Career information
- High school: Spring Valley (Spring Valley, Minnesota)
- College: St. Olaf
- NFL draft: 1962: 18th round, 250th overall pick

Career history
- New York Giants (1962–1964)
- Stats at Pro Football Reference

William Ross Winter (January 28, 1940 – May 29, 1995) was an American professional football linebacker who played for the New York Giants of the National Football League (NFL). He played college football for the St. Olaf Oles and was selected by the Giants in the 18th round of the 1962 NFL draft.

== Early life ==
William Ross Winter was born on January 28, 1940, in Milbank, South Dakota. He attended Spring Valley High School in Spring Valley, Minnesota.

== College career ==
Winter enrolled at St. Olaf College to play college sports for the Oles. He was a three-year letterman in football as a running back, two-year letterman in basketball, and one-year letterman in baseball. He was football team captain in 1961 and the team's most valuable player. Winter was inducted into St. Olaf's athletics hall of fame in 1997.

== Professional career ==
Winter was selected by the New York Giants in the 18th round, with the 250th overall pick, of the 1962 NFL draft. He started 11 games in 1962 and was named the Giants' rookie of the year. He started for the Giants in the 1962 NFL Championship Game. Winter played in 33 regular season games overall, starting 26, from 1962 to 1964, posting 1.5 sacks, one interception for 38 yards, and two fumble recoveries. On August 14, 1965, he quit pro football because it was "no longer fun to play."

== Personal life ==
Winter was an English teacher at Elk River High School in Elk River, Minnesota, during the NFL offseasons, and continued teaching there after his NFL career. He was the track and field head coach from 1969 to 1975, and also spent time as an assistant football coach. He operated a campground in Barnum, Minnesota, from 1975 until his death in 1995. Winter died on May 29, 1995, at his home in Carlton County, Minnesota.

== See also ==
- 1961 college football season#Scoring
