= American Journal of Legal History =

- Discipline: American law
- Language: English
- Edited by: Joshua Getzler, Yvonne Pitts

Publication details
- History: 1957–present
- Publisher: Oxford University Press
- Frequency: Quarterly
- Open access: Hybrid

Standard abbreviations
- Bluebook: Am. J. Legal Hist.
- ISO 4: Am. J. Leg. Hist.

Indexing
- ISSN: 0002-9319 (print); 2161-797X (web)
- LCCN: 93661985
- JSTOR: 00029319
- OCLC no.: 66567944

Links
- Journal homepage; Online archive

The American Journal of Legal History is a quarterly peer-reviewed law journal. It was established in 1957 and has been published by Oxford University Press since 2016.

== History ==
The journal was established by Temple University law library director Erwin C. Surrency. The first issue appeared in February 1957. From its inception until 1982, the journal was the official publication of the American Society for Legal History.

== Purpose ==
According to Surrency, the journal was created to provide legal historians with a forum for their work and as a means of advancing the "law through a study of its history."

The journal was the first English-language periodical devoted solely to legal history. The journal publishes articles, essays, and book reviews on all aspects of legal history. Although a popular misconception is that the journal's coverage is limited to "American legal history," the editors make it a point to regularly publish works on non-American legal history. The "American" part of the title denotes the journal's original location—in the United States—not the subject matter it publishes.

== Editors ==
The journal, which was published from 1957 through 2015 by the Temple University Beasley School of Law, had four editors-in-chief during that time, all of whom were with Temple University's law school: Erwin Surrency (1957–1981), Diane C. Maleson (1982–2002), Lawrence J. Reilly (2008–2014), and Harwell Wells (2015). From 2016 to 2021 the editors were Stefan Vogenauer and Alfred Brophy, who relaunched the journal as an Oxford University Press imprint. Since 2021 the editors are Joshua Getzler (Faculty of Law, University of Oxford) and Yvonne Pitts (Purdue University).

== Influence ==
Federal and state judges have cited the journal in 125 published opinions. Scholars have cited the journal in more than 3,000 articles and more than 15,000 books.

In their seminal work on the evolution of the growth of American legal history as a field of study, William E. Nelson and John Phillip Reid noted that the journal is "a publication in which academic historians speak to each other . . . [and] virtually every one of the many articles in the journal [is] essential reading for those wishing to keep current in the field."
