= Greyson Lambert =

American football player (born 1994)

Profile
- Position: Quarterback

Personal information
- Born: February 7, 1994 (age 32); Mobile, Alabama, U.S.
- Listed height: 6 ft 5 in (1.96 m)
- Listed weight: 234 lb (106 kg)

Career information
- High school: Jesup (GA) Wayne Co.
- College: Virginia (2012–2014); Georgia (2015–2016)
- NFL draft: 2017: undrafted

Awards and highlights
- NCAA record for completion percentage in a game (96%); Baseball career
- Pitcher
- Bats: Right Throws: Right

Greyson Bryce Lambert (born February 7, 1994) is an American former football quarterback and baseball pitcher, who began his college football career at the University of Virginia, where he spent three seasons playing for the Virginia Cavaliers. After the 2014 season, he transferred to the University of Georgia and played two seasons for the Georgia Bulldogs. Following his career with Georgia he signed with the Texas Rangers of Major League Baseball (MLB). Thereafter he became an attorney.

== Early life ==
Lambert attended Wayne County High School in Jesup, Georgia, where he was teammates with Tre' Jackson. In his three varsity seasons, he had 4,282 passing yards and 38 touchdowns. He was rated by Scout.com as a four-star recruit and was ranked among the top quarterbacks in his class. He committed to the University of Virginia to play college football.

== College career ==
=== Virginia ===
Lambert redshirted his first year at Virginia in 2012.

As redshirt freshman in 2013, he appeared in seven games, passing for 340 yards with one touchdown and two interceptions. Lambert took over as Virginia's starting quarterback in 2014. Overall, he started nine games, completing 154 of 261 passes for 1,632 yards with 10 touchdowns and 11 interceptions.

=== Georgia ===
In June 2015, Lambert transferred to the University of Georgia. In his first year at Georgia he was named the starter. During the third game of the season, against South Carolina, he completed 24 of 25 passes for a 96% completion percentage, which set an NCAA record. He also broke Georgia's record for consecutive completions with 20. Going into the game against South Carolina, the Bulldogs were 2–0 on the season. In the previous game against Vanderbilt, Lambert went 11–21 for 116 yards with no touchdowns or interceptions. Lambert went 24–25 for 330 yards, 3 touchdowns, and no interceptions against the Gamecocks. After missing one pass in the back of the end zone late in the first quarter, he went on to complete his final twenty passes of the game, setting a school record. Georgia ended the season with three losses. Lambert never came close to the production output he showed against South Carolina, finishing the season averaging only 167.6 passing yards per game. Lambert and the Bulldogs finished the season with a victory over Penn State in the Tax Slayer Bowl. With a record of 10–3, they were unranked in the final AP Poll.

Georgia's head coach Mark Richt got fired due to the disappointing result of the season, and Lambert's credentials as starting quarterback were questioned even further. The new head coach, Kirby Smart, and a new incoming five-star quarterback recruit, Jacob Eason. Lambert was in an open quarterback competition battling against Eason and fellow returning quarterback Brice Ramsey.

Kirby Smart did not announce who Georgia's 2016 opening day starting quarterback would be until game day. After the opening kickoff, Lambert trotted onto the field with the rest of the offensive starters to compete against North Carolina. Smart had decided to implement a system where both Lambert and Jacob Eason would put in work at the quarterback position. Eason ended up throwing for more yardage than Lambert, but Lambert was the quarterback for the game-clinching final drive. Georgia won the game 33–24.

Eason went on to start the next game against Nicholls State. He played the whole game until the fourth quarter, where Lambert was brought in to replace him on the final drive. Lambert's drive bled out the clock to get Georgia to hold on for the victory, 26–24. For the rest of the season however, Eason went on to become the starter.

In 2015, Lambert was the recipient of the Davis Family Football Foundation Scholarship. In 2016, Lambert was the recipient of the Jack and Joy Davis Football Scholarship.

== Professional baseball career and afterward ==
Lambert signed with baseball's Texas Rangers organization as a pitcher in 2017. He entered law school at the University of Georgia School of Law in the fall of 2018 and graduated in the spring of 2021. As of 2026, he was an attorney with a commercial real estate law firm in Atlanta.
