= T. Y. McGill =

American football player (born 1992)

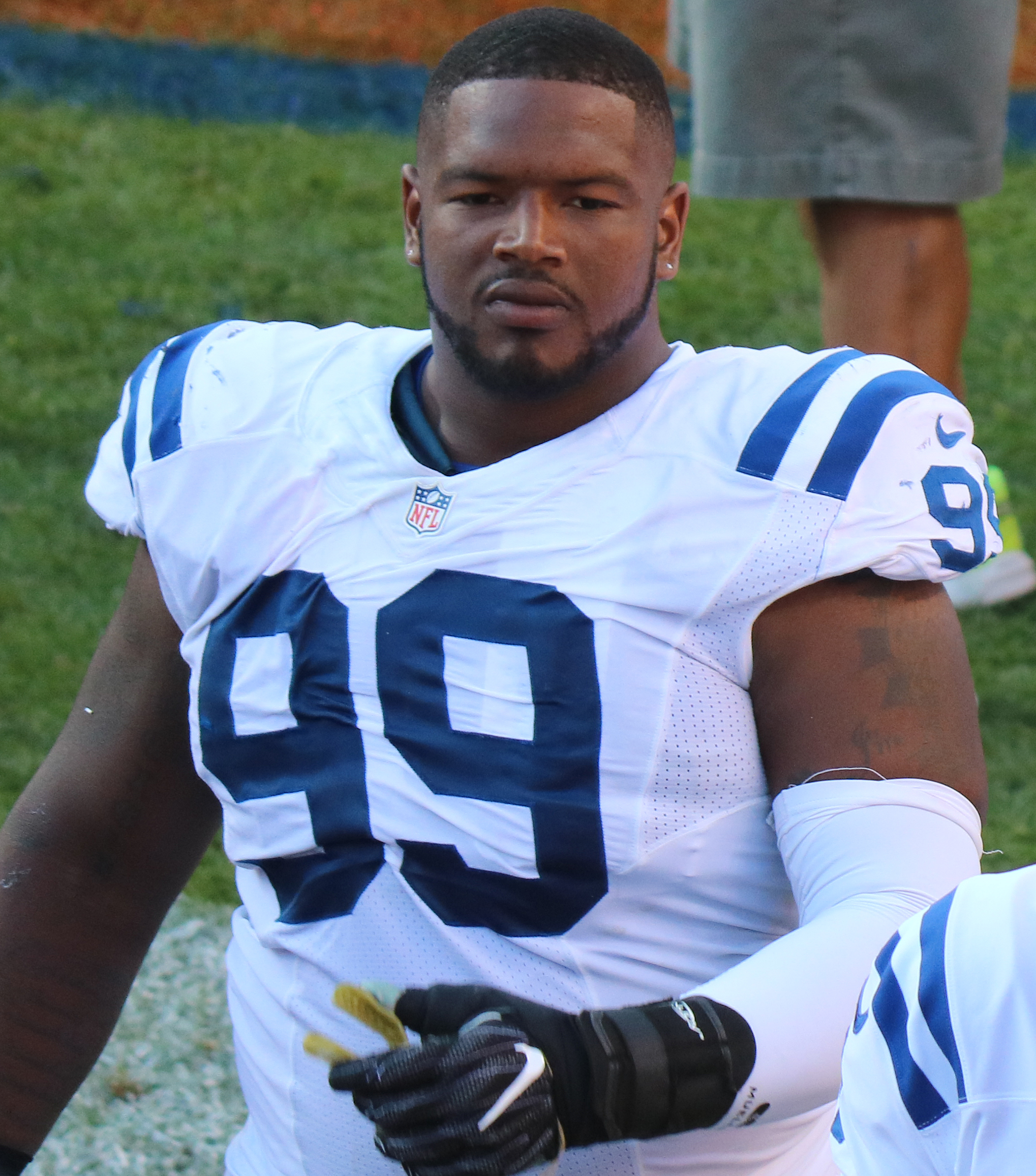
- McGill with the Indianapolis Colts in 2016

Profile
- Position: Defensive tackle

Personal information
- Born: November 23, 1992 (age 33); Jesup, Georgia, U.S.
- Listed height: 6 ft 0 in (1.83 m)
- Listed weight: 295 lb (134 kg)

Career information
- High school: Wayne County (Jesup)
- College: NC State (2011–2014)
- NFL draft: 2015: undrafted

Career history
- Seattle Seahawks (2015)*; Indianapolis Colts (2015–2016); Cleveland Browns (2017); Kansas City Chiefs (2018)*; Los Angeles Chargers (2018); Philadelphia Eagles (2018); Los Angeles Chargers (2018); Washington Redskins (2019); Los Angeles Chargers (2019); New Orleans Saints (2019); Philadelphia Eagles (2020–2021); Washington Football Team (2021)*; Minnesota Vikings (2021–2022); San Francisco 49ers (2022–2024); Cleveland Browns (2024)*
- * Offseason or practice squad member only

Career NFL statistics as of 2023
- Total tackles: 45
- Sacks: 5.5
- Forced fumbles: 2
- Stats at Pro Football Reference

Torrone "T. Y." McGill Jr. (born November 23, 1992) is an American professional football defensive tackle. He played college football at NC State and signed with the Seattle Seahawks as an undrafted free agent in 2015. McGill has since been a member of several other NFL teams.

== Early life and college ==
McGill was captain of both the football and basketball teams at Wayne County High School, and was an all-region selection after his junior and senior seasons. In 2010, he was selected to play in the 2010 Georgia North/South All-Star game and was recruited during his senior year by North Carolina State.

McGill was a starter in his freshman year at NC State, and finished his career with 120 total tackles and 10 sacks. McGill was suspended for two games in his senior year for undisclosed disciplinary reasons.

== Professional career ==
=== Pre-draft ===
McGill did not receive an invite to the 2015 NFL Combine, but did participate in a Pro Day at NC State.

Pre-draft measurables
Height	Weight	Arm length	Hand span	40-yard dash	10-yard split	20-yard split	20-yard shuttle	Three-cone drill	Vertical jump	Broad jump	Bench press
6 ft 0 1/4 in (1.84 m)	299 lb (136 kg)	33 3/4 in (0.86 m)	9 1/4 in (0.23 m)	4.96 s	1.75 s	2.95 s	4.81 s	7.00 s	29.0 in (0.74 m)	8 ft 11 in (2.72 m)	25 reps
All values from NC State Pro Day

=== Seattle Seahawks ===
McGill was signed as a free agent by the Seattle Seahawks on May 15, 2015, after attending their mini-camp on a try out basis. He was signed to the 90-man roster, and impressed early on, with head coach Pete Carroll saying, "All the way through all of our workouts, he’s been impressive." McGill was waived by the Seahawks on September 5.

=== Indianapolis Colts ===
McGill was claimed from waivers by the Indianapolis Colts on September 6, 2015.

On September 2, 2017, McGill was waived during the final cuts.

=== Cleveland Browns ===
On September 3, 2017, McGill was claimed off waivers by the Cleveland Browns. He was waived by the Browns on December 13, and re-signed to the practice squad.

=== Kansas City Chiefs ===
On January 15, 2018, McGill signed a reserve/future contract with the Kansas City Chiefs. He was waived by the Chiefs on September 1.

=== Los Angeles Chargers ===
On September 2, 2018, McGill was claimed off waivers by the Los Angeles Chargers. He was waived by Los Angeles on October 6.

=== Philadelphia Eagles ===
On October 8, 2018, McGill was claimed off waivers by the Philadelphia Eagles, but was waived two days later after failing his physical. He was re-signed by the Eagles on November 6. McGill was waived by Philadelphia on November 20.

=== Los Angeles Chargers (second stint) ===
On November 21, 2018, McGill was claimed off waivers by the Los Angeles Chargers. He was waived by the Chargers on August 31, 2019.

=== Washington Redskins ===
McGill signed with the Washington Redskins on September 10, 2019. He was released by the Redskins on September 24.

=== Los Angeles Chargers (third stint) ===
On October 17, 2019, McGill was signed by the Los Angeles Chargers. He was released by Los Angeles on November 30.

=== New Orleans Saints ===
On December 11, 2019, McGill was signed by the New Orleans Saints. He was released by New Orleans on December 16.

=== Philadelphia Eagles (second stint) ===
On August 26, 2020, McGill was signed by the Philadelphia Eagles. He was waived by Philadelphia on September 4. On September 9, McGill was re-signed to the Eagles' practice squad. He was elevated to the active roster on September 12, October 22, November 14, November 21, and November 30 for the team's Weeks 1, 7, 10, 11, and 12 games against the Washington Football Team, New York Giants twice, Cleveland Browns, and Seattle Seahawks, and reverted to the practice squad after each game. McGill was signed to the active roster on December 26.

McGill signed a one-year contract extension with the Eagles on January 4, 2021. He was released by the Eagles on September 13.

=== Washington Football Team ===
On September 28, 2021, McGill was signed to the Washington Football Team's practice squad. He was released by Washington on November 1.

=== Minnesota Vikings ===
On November 9, 2021, McGill was signed to the Minnesota Vikings' practice squad. He was re-signed on March 9, 2022. McGill was placed on injured reserve on August 29. He was released by the Vikings on September 6.

=== San Francisco 49ers ===
On October 11, 2022, McGill was signed to the San Francisco 49ers' practice squad. He was promoted to the active roster on November 26.

On March 17, 2023, McGill re-signed with the 49ers. He was released on August 29, and re-signed to the practice squad.

McGill re-signed with San Francisco on February 14, 2024. He was released by the 49ers on August 27, and was subsequently re-signed to the practice squad. On November 13, McGill was released by the 49ers.

=== Cleveland Browns (second stint) ===
On December 6, 2024, McGill signed with the Cleveland Browns' practice squad. He was released on December 24.
