= Wayne County High School (Georgia) =

Public school in Jesup, Georgia, United States

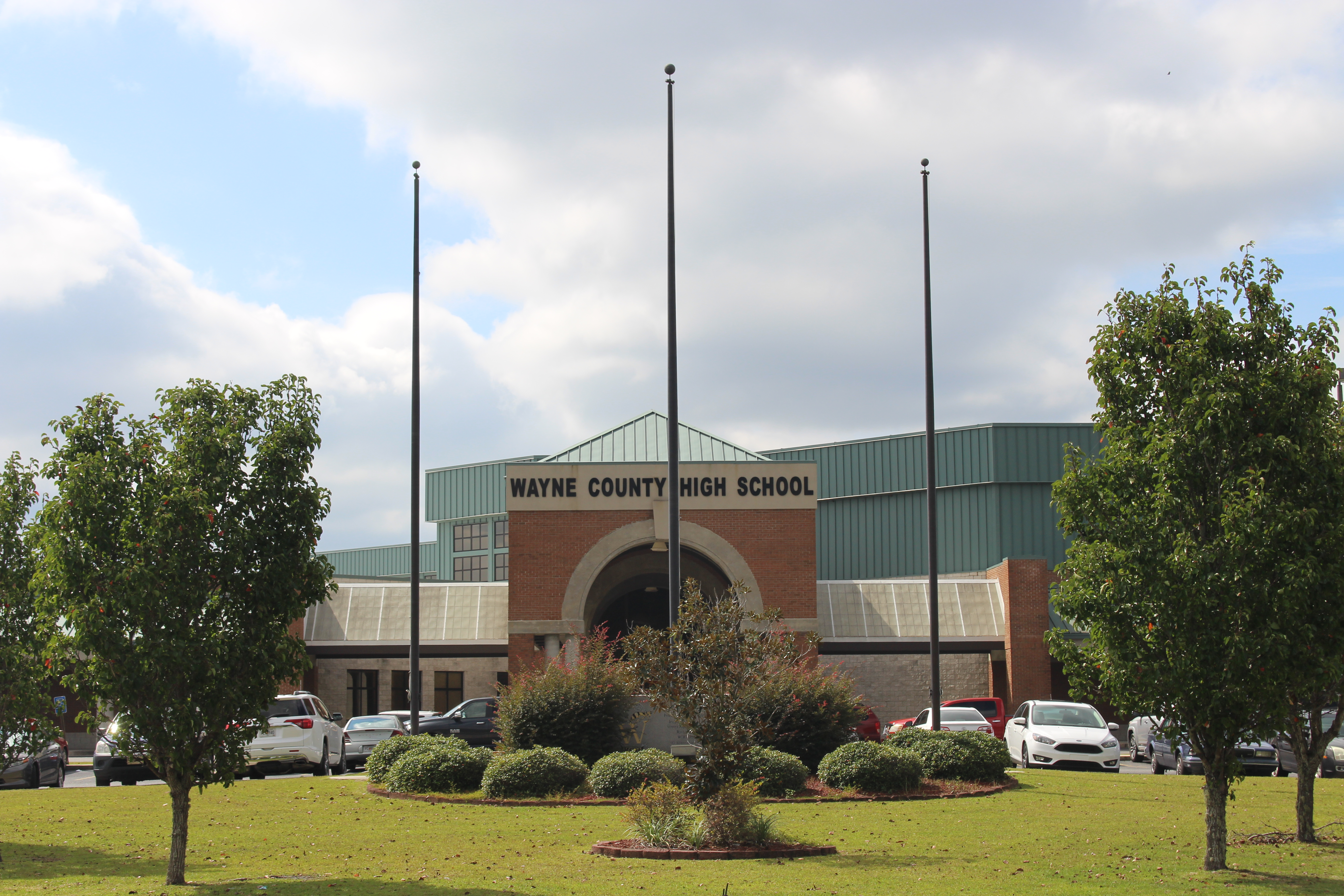

Location
- 1 Jacket Drive; Jesup, Georgia 31545; United States; 31°37′03″N 81°55′06″W

Information
- School type: Public, secondary
- Motto: "We are Wayne County"
- Established: 1966
- School district: Wayne County School District
- Superintendent: Jay Brinson
- Principal: Brett McDaniel(interim)
- Staff: 90.00 (FTE)
- Grades: 9th-12th
- Enrollment: 1,509 (2023-2024)
- Student to teacher ratio: 16.77
- Colors: Gold and White
- Mascot: Yellow Jacket
- Rivals: Glynn Academy, Appling County
- Website: Wayne County High School

Wayne County High School is located in Jesup, Georgia, United States. It is the only public high school in Wayne County.

The school was founded in 1966 from the consolidation of Jesup, Odum, Screven and Northside high schools. Originally located on Orange Street, it moved to its current campus in 2002. However in 2022 only Baseball Football and Softball are held at the original campus.

== Extracurricular activities ==
Wayne County's mascot is the Yellow Jacket. Sports offered include:

- Baseball
- Basketball
- Cross country
- Football
- Golf
- Marching band
- Soccer
- Softball
- Swimming
- Tennis
- Track
- Wrestling

The school's fight song is sung to the tune of the "Washington and Lee Swing".

=== State Titles ===
- Baseball (1) - 1967(2A)
- Football (1) - 1959(2A)
- Slow Pitch Softball (1) - 1998(3A/4A)

=== State Titles won as Jesup High School ===
- Football (1) - 1954(A)
- Literary (6) - 1947(B), 1948(B), 1949(B), 1951(B), 1952(B), 1954(A)

== Notable alumni ==
- Barret Browning - former professional baseball player
- Matt Fuller – college football running back for the South Carolina Gamecocks
- Len Hauss - former NFL football player
- Tre' Jackson - former NFL football player
- Greyson Lambert - former college football and baseball player
- T. Y. McGill - current NFL football player
- Lindsay Scott - former NFL football player
- Trevin Wallace - college football player
- John Warren - former NFL football player
