= Jesup, Georgia =

- City
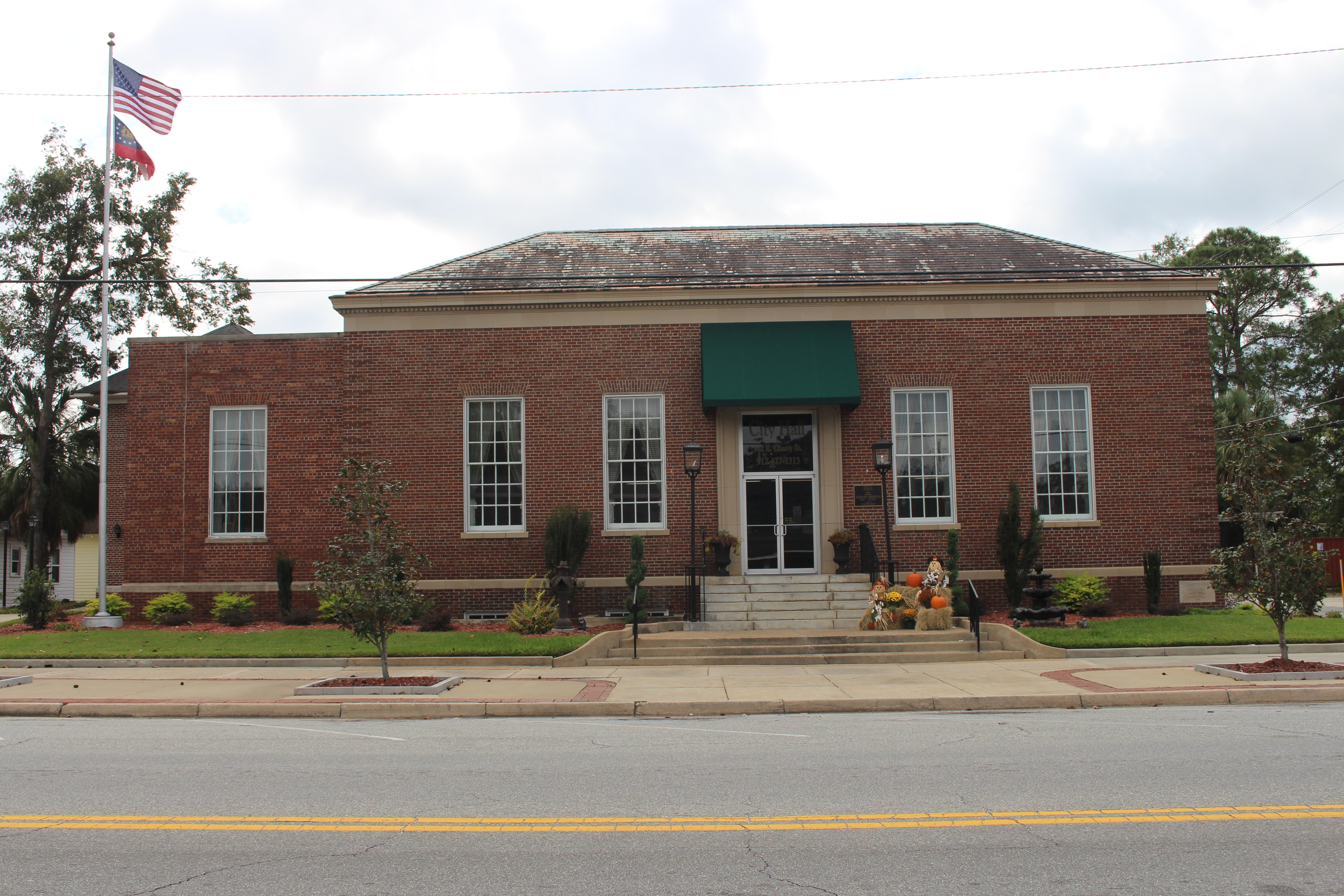
- City Hall photo

- Logo

- Location in Wayne County and the state of Georgia
- Coordinates: 31°36′7″N 81°53′6″W
- Country: United States
- State: Georgia
- County: Wayne

Government
  - Mayor: Ralph Hickox
  - City Manager: Nicholas D. Ellis

Area
  - Total: 16.76 sq mi (43.41 km^{2})
  - Land: 16.54 sq mi (42.85 km^{2})
  - Water: 0.22 sq mi (0.56 km^{2})
- Elevation: 95 ft (29 m)

Population (2020)
  - Total: 9,809
  - Density: 593/sq mi (228.9/km^{2})
- Time zone: UTC-5 (Eastern (EST))
  - Summer (DST): UTC-4 (EDT)
- ZIP codes: 31545-31546, 31599
- Area code: 912
- FIPS code: 13-42268
- GNIS feature ID: 0316104
- Website: http://www.jesupga.gov/

Jesup is a city in and the county seat of Wayne County, Georgia, United States. The population was 9,809 at the 2020 census.

== History ==
By February 1869, Willis Clary had begun building a two-story hotel near the junction of Macon and Brunswick Railroad and the Atlantic and Gulf Railroad and four stores had sprung up in the area. Clary became a driving force for the establishment of what would become Jesup and was its first mayor.

By September 1869, the town included five stores, a sawmill, and a railroad eating house in addition to Clary's hotel. By December 1869, the community had become known as Jesup.

Jesup was named for Thomas Jesup, a general during the Second Seminole War.

The area was then part of Appling County, Georgia. On August 27, 1872, eastern sections of Appling land districts 3 and 4 were added to Wayne County. In 1873, the seat of Wayne County was transferred to Jesup from Waynesville.

== Geography ==
According to the United States Census Bureau, the city has a total area of 16.6 square miles (43 km^{2}), of which, 16.5 square miles (43 km^{2}) of it is land and 0.1 square miles (0.26 km^{2}) of it (0.30%) is water. It is 35 miles west of Hinesville and 12 miles southwest of Ludowici, Georgia.

== Demographics ==
Historical population
Census	Pop.	Note	%±
1880	562		—
1890	907		61.4%
1900	805		−11.2%
1910	1,415		75.8%
1920	1,941		37.2%
1930	2,303		18.7%
1940	2,903		26.1%
1950	4,605		58.6%
1960	7,304		58.6%
1970	9,091		24.5%
1980	9,418		3.6%
1990	8,958		−4.9%
2000	9,279		3.6%
2010	10,214		10.1%
2020	9,809		−4.0%
U.S. Decennial Census

=== 2020 census ===
As of the 2020 census, Jesup had a population of 9,809. The median age was 39.9 years. 21.2% of residents were under the age of 18 and 16.8% of residents were 65 years of age or older. For every 100 females there were 121.5 males, and for every 100 females age 18 and over there were 127.2 males age 18 and over.

88.8% of residents lived in urban areas, while 11.2% lived in rural areas.

There were 3,308 households in Jesup, of which 32.9% had children under the age of 18 living in them. Of all households, 33.6% were married-couple households, 19.8% were households with a male householder and no spouse or partner present, and 40.4% were households with a female householder and no spouse or partner present. About 32.8% of all households were made up of individuals and 14.4% had someone living alone who was 65 years of age or older.

As of the 2020 census, there were 2,365 families residing in the city.

There were 3,666 housing units, of which 9.8% were vacant. The homeowner vacancy rate was 2.1% and the rental vacancy rate was 7.9%.

Jesup racial composition as of 2020
Race	Num.	Perc.
White (non-Hispanic)	4,692	47.83%
Black or African American (non-Hispanic)	3,954	40.31%
Native American	27	0.28%
Asian	92	0.94%
Other/Mixed	336	3.43%
Hispanic or Latino	708	7.22%

== Economy ==
The Federal Bureau of Prisons operates the Federal Correctional Institution in Jesup.

== Education ==
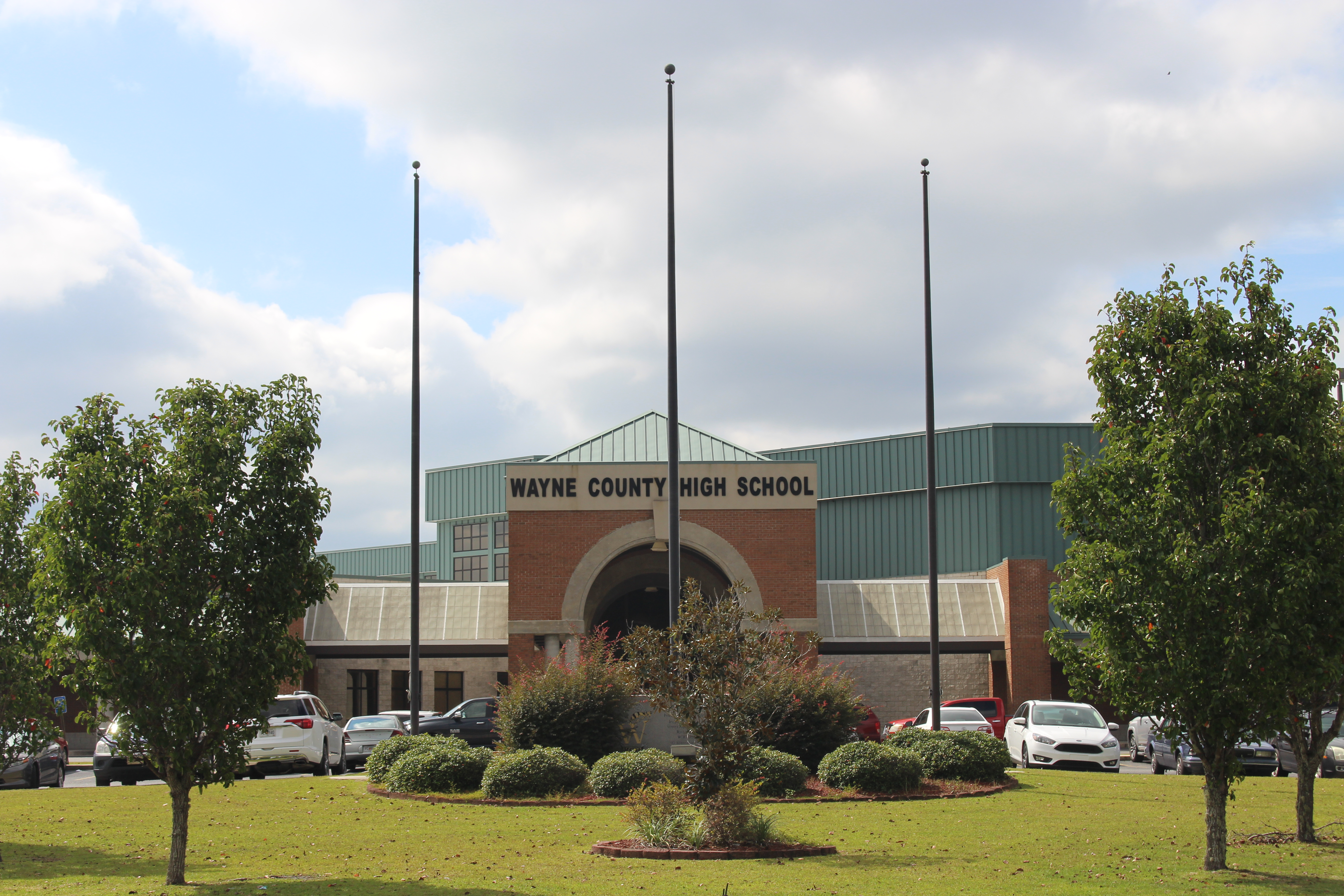
Wayne County High School

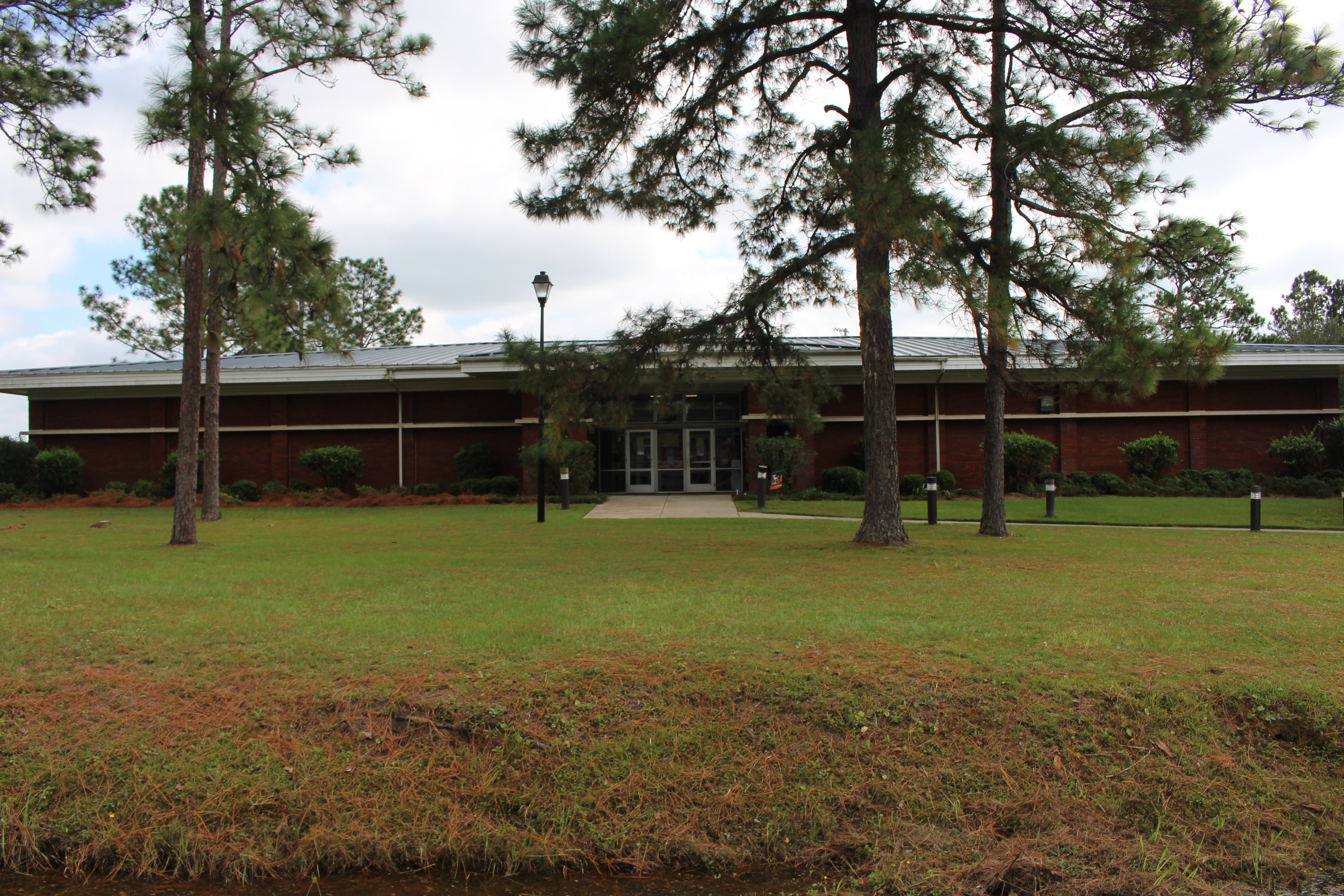
Wayne County Library

The Wayne County School District holds pre-school to grade 12, and consists of a pre-K center, five elementary schools, two middle schools, a high school, and an academy school. The district has 320 full-time teachers and over 5,256 students.

Jesup is home to Coastal Pines Technical College as well as one high school, Wayne County High School, which is located within the city limits. This complex replaced the original Wayne County High School on Orange Street, and was completed in 2002. In 2014, the county school system took bids for asbestos removal and the demolition of buildings belonging to the old high school. Until its demolition, the original facility was still providing usefulness, housing the Jesup Police, the Boys and Girls Club of Wayne County, and the Three Rivers Regional Library System's Regional Office. The Jesup Police Department is now located in the facilities previously housing Jesup Elementary, at 642 E. Plum Street. All sporting events except basketball and tennis and track including football, baseball, soccer, and softball, are held at the original Wayne County High School complex.

The Wayne County Library borders the sports complex.

== Notable people ==
- Ed Bacon – progressive Episcopal priest and author of 8 Habits of Love: Open Your Heart, Open Your Mind
- Randall Bramblett – musician
- Tasha Cobbs – Grammy-winning gospel singer
- Len Hauss – former NFL football player
- Tre' Jackson – current NFL football player
- Omari Kelly - NFL player
- Greyson Lambert- former University of Georgia quarterback
- David Larson- Olympian Gold medalist in the 1984 Summer Olympics
- Ray Mattox – politician
- T. Y. McGill – current NFL football player
- Lindsay Scott – former NFL football player
- Erwin C. Surrency – legal historian, author, professor
- John Warren – former NFL player
- Drew Worsham – musician
- Erriyon Knighton – American athlete and sprinter, specializing in the 100 and 200 meters
