= Len Vella =

Canadian football player (born 1940)

Profile
- Position: Tackle

Personal information
- Born: 1940 (age 85–86); United States
- Listed height: 6 ft 3 in (1.91 m)
- Listed weight: 250 lb (113 kg)

Career information
- College: Georgia
- NFL draft: 1962: 15th round, 197th overall pick

Career history
- 1962–1963: Edmonton Eskimos

Leonard Vella (born 1940) is an American former Canadian football tackle who played for the Edmonton Eskimos.

== Career ==
According to Topps, he played for the University of Georgia, and was a Washington Redskins choice.
