= Tom Pennington =

American football player (1939–2013)

No. 1
- Position: Placekicker

Personal information
- Born: November 26, 1939; Albany, Georgia, U.S.
- Died: March 4, 2013 (aged 73); Princeton, West Virginia, U.S.
- Listed height: 6 ft 2 in (1.88 m)
- Listed weight: 210 lb (95 kg)

Career information
- High school: Albany
- College: Georgia
- NFL draft: 1962: 12th round, 168th overall pick
- AFL draft: 1962: 11th round, 86th overall pick

Career history
- Dallas Texans (1962)

Awards and highlights
- AFL champion (1962)

Career AFL statistics
- Field goals: 5 / 2
- Field goal %: 40
- Extra points: 15 / 13
- Stats at Pro Football Reference

Thomas Durward Pennington Jr. (November 26, 1939 – March 4, 2013) was an American professional football placekicker who played in the American Football League (AFL). He was born in Albany, Georgia. Pennington played college football for the Georgia Bulldogs. He was drafted by the Green Bay Packers in the 12th round (168th overall) of the 1962 National Football League draft and the Buffalo Bills in the 11th round (86th overall) of the 1962 AFL draft but did not play for either team. He played with the Dallas Texans in 1962.
