= Dale Carver =

American football player (born 1961)

No. 59
- Position: Linebacker

Personal information
- Born: March 5, 1961 (age 65); Melbourne, Florida, U.S.
- Listed height: 6 ft 2 in (1.88 m)
- Listed weight: 225 lb (102 kg)

Career information
- High school: Melbourne (FL) Palm Bay
- College: Georgia
- NFL draft: 1983: undrafted

Career history
- Los Angeles Raiders (1983)*; Cleveland Browns (1983)
- * Offseason or practice squad member only

Awards and highlights
- National champion (1980)
- Stats at Pro Football Reference

Dale Carver (born March 5, 1961) is an American former professional football linebacker. He played for the Cleveland Browns in 1983.
