= Tom Goosby =

American football player (1939–2018)

No. 62, 69, 51
- Positions: Guard, Linebacker

Personal information
- Born: May 24, 1939; Alliance, Ohio, U.S.
- Died: June 25, 2018 (aged 79); Akron, Ohio, U.S.
- Listed height: 6 ft 0 in (1.83 m)
- Listed weight: 235 lb (107 kg)

Career information
- High school: Alliance (OH)
- College: Balwin–Wallace
- NFL draft: 1962: 15th round, 207th overall pick

Career history
- Cleveland Browns (1963); Washington Redskins (1966); BC Lions (1967)

Career NFL statistics
- Games played: 15
- Games started: 11
- Stats at Pro Football Reference

Thomas Aaron Goosby (May 24, 1939 – June 25, 2018) was an American professional football offensive lineman in the National Football League.

== Football career ==
Goosby played for the Cleveland Browns and the Washington Redskins. He started Left Guard for the Redskins in 1966. He also played college football at Baldwin–Wallace College and was drafted in the fifteenth round of the 1962 NFL Draft as a redshirt. Goosby played on the Cleveland Browns in 1963 and the Washington Redskins in 1966. He missed the entire 1964 Browns season due to injury. Goosby was severely hampered by serious knee injuries which led to his early retirement from football.
