= Milton McPike =

American educator and football player (1939–2008)

- Born: October 9, 1939; Jacksonville, Illinois, US
- Died: March 29, 2008 (aged 68); Madison, Wisconsin, US
- Education: Truman State University
- Spouse(s): Sharon McPike, Ruth McPike (divorced)

Milton McPike (October 9, 1939 – March 29, 2008) was an American educator and San Francisco 49ers player, and the principal of Madison East High School for 23 years. He also served on the Board of Regents for the University of Wisconsin–Madison until his death in 2008.

== Biography ==
=== Early life and education ===
Milton Lee McPike was born October 9, 1939, in Jacksonville, Illinois. He played high school football with boxer Ken Norton. He attended Northeast Missouri State University Teacher's College (now Truman State University) from 1958 to 1962. While there, he earned 12 letters in basketball, track and football.

=== Career ===
In 1962, he was a 12th-round draft pick by the San Francisco 49ers. Following his NFL experience, McPike taught and coached sports for 11 years in Quincy, Illinois.

In 1974, he moved to Madison, Wisconsin, where he served as vice principal of Madison West High School for five years. In 1979, he was appointed principal of Madison East High School. Under his leadership at East, the school gained a reputation for academic focus and was recognized as a National School of Excellence in 1989. He retired as principal in 2002. The Madison East High School Fieldhouse was named after McPike in 2005.

McPike served on several hospital and foundation boards and was named to the UW Board of Regents in 2004, resigning as regent in March 2008 for health reasons.

=== Marriage and children ===
McPike and his wife Sharon, had no children together. McPike had three sons (Milton Jr., Jeff and Jim) with his first wife Ruth. Sharon had three children (Scott, Kimberly and Rebecca) from a previous marriage.

=== Death and afterward ===
McPike died on March 29, 2008, in Madison, Wisconsin, of adenocystic carcinoma.

== Awards ==
- 1990: named one of ten "American Heroes in Education" by Reader's Digest
- 1997: Wisconsin State Principal of the Year
- 2007: Reverend Dr. Martin Luther King Jr. Humanitarian Award
