= Len Hauss =

American football player (1942–2021)

No. 56
- Position: Center

Personal information
- Born: July 11, 1942; Jesup, Georgia, U.S.
- Died: December 15, 2021 (aged 79); Jesup, Georgia, U.S.
- Listed height: 6 ft 2 in (1.88 m)
- Listed weight: 235 lb (107 kg)

Career information
- High school: Jesup
- College: Georgia (1960-1963)
- NFL draft: 1964: 9th round, 115th overall pick

Career history
- Washington Redskins (1964–1977)

Awards and highlights
- 2× Second-team All-Pro (1974, 1975); 5× Pro Bowl (1966, 1968–1970, 1972); 90 Greatest Redskins; Washington Commanders Ring of Fame; Georgia Sports Hall of Fame (1981)

Career NFL statistics
- Games played: 196
- Games started: 194
- Fumble recoveries: 5
- Stats at Pro Football Reference

Leonard Moore Hauss (July 11, 1942 – December 15, 2021) was an American professional football player who was a center in the National Football League (NFL) for the Washington Redskins (now Washington Commanders) from 1964 to 1977. A five-time Pro Bowl selection, he was named one of the 70 Greatest Redskins. Hauss played college football for the Georgia Bulldogs and was selected by the Redskins in the ninth round of the 1964 NFL draft.

== Early life ==
Hauss was born on July 11, 1942, in Jesup, Georgia to Leonard and Ida Hauss. Hauss attended Jesup High School (now Wayne County High School), where he played high school football as a fullback, lineman, and linebacker. He overcame a knee injury to play three years on the varsity (1956-59). As a senior, he rushed for 1,500 yards and scored 15 touchdowns, and led the team to the Georgia Class AA Championship. He was named to the All-Region, All-State, All-Southern and prep All-America teams.

== College career ==
Hauss attended and played college football at the University of Georgia. While successful as a fullback in high school, he lacked the speed to star at that position in college, and he became a center and linebacker. Hauss suffered an ACL injury as a sophomore, but through hard work and a demanding workout regimen he created for himself, he was able to return to play. He received All-Southeastern Conference honors as a sophomore.

Hauss was a member of the Sigma Chi fraternity.

== Professional career ==
Hauss was drafted in the ninth round (115th overall) of the 1964 NFL draft. He started his first game at center four games into the 1964 season, replacing Fred Hageman, a job he would not lose until retirement. Hauss helped lead the Redskins to the Super Bowl VII in 1972. He started 192 consecutive games for the Redskins between 1964 and 1977. He also started the seven post-season games in which he appeared.

He was named to the Pro Bowl five times, in 1966, 1968–1970, and 1972. He was named second-team All-Pro by the Associated Press (AP) and United Press International (UPI) in 1974 and 1975, as well as first-team All-Conference by the AP and The Sporting News in those years. In 1978, he was replaced by Bob Kuziel.

He was close with teammate quarterbacks Sonny Jurgenson and Billy Kilmer. His coaches included Hall of Famers Vince Lombardi and George Allen.

== Honors ==
He is a member of the Washington Commanders Ring of Fame. In 2002, he was named among Washington's 70 greatest players in franchise history, and in 2012 was named among the 80 greatest. He is a member of the Georgia Sports Hall of Fame (1981) and the Wayne County Sports Hall of Fame.

== After football ==
After retiring from the NFL, Hauss entered the financial services industry, and had a 30-year banking career.

== Death ==
Hauss died on December 15, 2021, at the age of 79. He was survived by his wife of 59 years, Janis (Johnson) Hauss with whom he went to high school, and their daughter and grandchildren.
