= Phil Sullivan =

Australian rules footballer (1903–1970)

Personal information
- Full name: Philip Gerard Sullivan
- Born: 8 September 1903; Ballarat East, Victoria
- Died: 15 February 1970 (aged 66); Caulfield, Victoria
- Original team: St Arnaud
- Height: 184 cm (6 ft 0 in)
- Weight: 84 kg (185 lb)

Playing career^{1}
Years	Club	Games (Goals)
1926	Hawthorn	7 (1)
- ^{1} Playing statistics correct to the end of 1926.

Philip Gerard Sullivan (8 September 1903 – 15 February 1970) was an Australian rules footballer who played with Hawthorn in the Victorian Football League (VFL).

== Early life ==
The son of Phillip Edward Sullivan (1874–1932) and Mary Gertrude Sullivan, née Goodman (1871–1905), Philip Gerard Sullivan was born at Ballarat on 8 September 1903. His mother and younger sister both died when he was an infant, and he and his father moved to Geelong where his father remarried.

== Football ==
Phil Sullivan joined Hawthorn at the start of the 1926 VFL season from St Arnaud. He made his debut against South Melbourne in Round 10 and played seven of the final eight games of the season. He left Hawthorn to coach Somerville in the Mornington Peninsula league in 1927.

== Later life ==
Phil Sullivan married Rosa Carolina Kahl (1905–1947) in 1928 and they had six children together. He worked for the railways and they lived in Ararat for about ten years before returning to Melbourne. Following his wife's death in 1947, Sullivan married Elizabeth Mary O'Leary (1908-2003) and had two more children.

Sullivan resided in Oakleigh until his death in 1970 and is buried at Springvale Botanical Cemetery.
