= Jiggy Smaha =

American gridiron football player (1946–2018)

No. 50
- Position: Linebacker

Personal information
- Born: September 19, 1946; Hazleton, Pennsylvania, U.S.
- Died: October 2, 2018 (aged 72); Macon, Georgia, U.S.
- Listed height: 6 ft 2 in (1.88 m)
- Listed weight: 235 lb (107 kg)

Career information
- College: Georgia (1964–1967)
- NFL draft: 1969: 14th round, 358th overall pick

Career history
- 1968: BC Lions
- 1969: Cleveland Browns*
- 1970: New York Giants*
- 1974: Jacksonville Sharks*
- 1974: Florida Blazers*
- 1974: Detroit Lions*
- * Offseason or practice squad member only

Jiggy Ephram Smaha II (September 19, 1946 – October 2, 2018) was an American professional football linebacker who played one season with the BC Lions of the Canadian Football League (CFL). He played college football at the University of Georgia. He was selected by the Cleveland Browns in the 14th round of the 1969 NFL/AFL draft.

== Early life and college ==
Jiggy Ephram Smaha II was born on September 19, 1946, in Hazleton, Pennsylvania. He attended Lanier High School in Macon, Georgia. He earned Class AAA all-state honors his senior year in 1963. Smaha was also named the Class AAA Lineman of the Year by both The Atlanta Constitution and The Atlanta Journal. He participated in track in high school as well, finishing second in the state in the discus throw. He was inducted into the Macon Sports Hall of Fame in 2010.

Smaha was a member of the Georgia Bulldogs of the University of Georgia from 1964 to 1967. He did not play during his freshmen year in 1964 as freshman were not allowed on the varsity team due to NCAA rules at the time. He played for the Bulldogs as a sophomore in 1965. Smaha missed the entire 1966 season after being suspended for academic ineligibility. He earned his only letter at Georgia in 1967. He was in the military from February to June 1968. Prior to the start of his senior year, Smaha was ruled academically ineligible again in August 1968.

== Professional career ==
Smaha then attempted to sign with the Dallas Cowboys of the National Football League but the league voided the contract due to Smaha having one year of college eligibility remaining.

Smaha signed with the BC Lions of the Canadian Football League in September 1968. He played in eight games for the Lions during the 1968 season and recovered one fumble.

Smaha was selected by the Cleveland Browns in the 14th round, with the 358th overall pick, of the 1969 NFL/AFL draft. He was released after suffering an injury.

Smaha was signed by the New York Giants in May 1970. He was cut by the Giants on June 18, 1970.

Smaha signed with the Jacksonville Sharks of the World Football League (WFL) in April 1974. In June 1974, he was traded to the Florida Blazers for a future draft pick. He was released by the Blazers later in June.

Smaha then signed with the Detroit Lions in 1974. On August 17, 1974, it was reported that he had been released.

== Personal life ==
Smaha's father and son were also named Jiggy. Smaha later started his own real estate business.

He died on October 2, 2018, in Macon, Georgia.
