= 1961 Colorado Buffaloes football team =

American college football season

1961 Colorado Buffaloes football

Big 8 champion

Orange Bowl, L 7–25 vs. LSU
- Conference: Big Eight Conference

Ranking
- Coaches: No. 7
- AP: No. 7
- Record: 9–2 (7–0 Big 8)
- Head coach: Sonny Grandelius (3rd season)
- MVP: Joe Romig
- Captain: Joe Romig
- Home stadium: Folsom Field

1961 Big Eight Conference football standings
| | Conf. | | | | | Overall |
| Team | W | | L | | T | W | | L | | T |
|---|---|---|---|---|---|---|---|---|---|---|
| No. 7 Colorado $ | 7 | – | 0 | – | 0 | 9 | – | 2 | – | 0 |
| No. 11 Missouri | 5 | – | 2 | – | 0 | 7 | – | 2 | – | 1 |
| Kansas | 5 | – | 2 | – | 0 | 7 | – | 3 | – | 1 |
| Oklahoma | 4 | – | 3 | – | 0 | 5 | – | 5 | – | 0 |
| Iowa State | 3 | – | 4 | – | 0 | 5 | – | 5 | – | 0 |
| Oklahoma State | 2 | – | 5 | – | 0 | 4 | – | 6 | – | 0 |
| Nebraska | 2 | – | 5 | – | 0 | 3 | – | 6 | – | 1 |
| Kansas State | 0 | – | 7 | – | 0 | 2 | – | 8 | – | 0 |
$ – Conference champion; Rankings from AP Poll

The 1961 Colorado Buffaloes football team was an American football team that represented the University of Colorado, now known as the University of Colorado Boulder, as a member of the Big Eight Conference (Big 8) during the 1961 college football season. In their third and final year under head coach Sonny Grandelius, the Buffaloes compiled a 9–2 record (7–0 in conference games), won the Big 8 championship, and outscored opponents by a total of 184 to 104.

Colorado defeated both Oklahoma and Nebraska on the road and defeated No. 10 Missouri at home. Their only loss in the regular season was to Utah. The Buffaloes were ranked No. 7 in the final AP writers and UPI coaches polls and concluded their season with a 25–7 loss to No. 4 LSU in the Orange Bowl on New Year's Day.

The team included several notable players including:

- Guard and team captain Joe Romig was the team captain, a consensus first-team All-American, and the winner of the 1961 UPI Lineman of the Year award and Knute Rockne Memorial Trophy. The Buffaloes also retired Romig's jersey (No. 67).
- End Jerry Hillebrand also received first-team All-America honors and was the No. 2 scorer in the Big 8 with 49 points.
- Quarterback Gale Weidner set multiple school records during the 1961 season, including most career yards of total offense (3,091) and most career passing yardage (3,033).

The team played its home games on campus at Folsom Field in Boulder, Colorado.

== Schedule ==
| Date | Opponent | Rank | Site | TV | Result | Attendance | Source |
|---|---|---|---|---|---|---|---|
| September 30 | Oklahoma State | | Folsom Field; Boulder, CO | | W 24–0 | 40,000 | |
| October 7 | Kansas | | Folsom Field; Boulder, CO | | W 20–19 | 42,700 | |
| October 13 | at Miami (FL)* | | Miami Orange Bowl; Miami, FL | | W 9–7 | 40,393–40,397 | |
| October 21 | at Kansas State | No. 9 | Memorial Stadium; Manhattan, KS (rivalry) | | W 13–0 | 12,500 | |
| October 28 | at Oklahoma | No. 10 | Oklahoma Memorial Stadium; Norman, OK | | W 22–14 | 45,117 | |
| November 4 | No. 10 Missouri^{†} | No. 8 | Folsom Field; Boulder, CO | | W 7–6 | 43,000 | |
| November 11 | Utah* | No. 8 | Folsom Field; Boulder, CO (rivalry) | | L 12–21 | 25,000 | |
| November 18 | at Nebraska | No. 8 | Memorial Stadium; Lincoln, NE (rivalry) | | W 7–0 | 26,000–28,108 | |
| November 25 | Iowa State | No. 7 | Folsom Field; Boulder, CO | | W 34–0 | 30,399 | |
| December 2 | Air Force* | No. 7 | Folsom Field; Boulder, CO | | W 29–12 | 23,287 | |
| January 1, 1962 | vs. No. 4 LSU* | No. 7 | Miami Orange Bowl; Miami, FL (Orange Bowl) | ABC | L 7–25 | 62,391 | |
*Non-conference game; ^{†}Homecoming; Rankings from AP Poll released prior to the game

== Statistics ==
During their 10-game regular season, the Buffaloes gained 3,101 yards of total offense, including 1,182 passing yards.

Quarterback Gale Weidner completed 74 of 162 passes (45.7%) for 1,101 yards, eight touchdowns, and 12 interceptions. During the 1961 season, Weidner set five University of Colorado records: most career yards of total offense (3,091); most career pass completions (219); most career passing yardage (3,033); most career touchdown passes (18); and most single-season touchdown passes (8).

The team's rushing leaders were Ted Woods (525 yards, 107 carries, 4.9-yard average), Loren Schweninger (512 yards, 122 carries, 4.2-yard average), Bill Harris (434 yards, 82 carries, 5.3-yard average), and Larry Mavity (183 yards, 38 carries, 4.8-yard average).

Jerry Hillebrand and Ken Blair ranked second and third in receiving in the Big 8. Hillebrand caught 15 for 323 yards, and Blair caught 10 for 263 yards.

Hillebrand was the No. 2 scorer in the Big 8 with 49 points.

Leon Mavity led the conference in punt return average, returning 10 punts for 130 yards, an average of 13.0 yards per return.

== Awards and honors ==
Senior guard Joe Romig also played linebacker on defense and was the team captain. After the season, Romig received multiple awards and honors:

- Rommig a consensus first-team pick on the 1961 All-America team, receiving first-team honors from the United Press International (UPI), American Football Coaches Association, Football Writers Association of America, Sporting News, and the Walter Camp Football Foundation.
- Romig also received the UPI Lineman of the Year award for 1961.
- He also received the Knute Rockne Memorial Trophy as the collegiate lineman of the year.
- Romig's jersey No. 67 was retired by the Colorado Buffaloes following the 1961 season.

End Jerry Hillebrand received first-team All-America honors from the Associated Press (AP) and Football Writers Association of America (FWAA).

Six Colorado players were recognized by the AP and/or the United Press International (UPI) on the 1961 All-Big Eight Conference football team: Romig (AP-1, UPI-1), Hillebrand (AP-1, UPI-1), center Walter Klinker (AP-1, UPI-1); quarterback Gale Weidner (AP-2, UPI-1), fullback Loren Schweninger (AP-2); and end Ken Blair (AP-2). Romig was also the team captain.

== Personnel ==
=== Players ===
- Ken Blair (#87), end, junior, 6'1", 201 pounds
- Ed Coleman (#31), halfback, junior, 5'11", 180 pounds
- John Denvir (#72), tackle, senior, 6'2", 236 pounds
- Bill Frank (#76), tackle, sophomore, 6'4", 235 pounds
- Dan Grimm (#77), tackle, junior, 6'3", 229 pounds
- Bill Harris (#33), halfback, sophomore, 6'2", 210 pounds
- Ralph Heck (#51), guard, junior, 6'1", 211 pounds
- Jerry Hillebrand (#82), end, senior, 6'4", 235 pounds
- Walt Klinker (#67), center, senior, 6'0", 202 pounds
- Leroy Loudermilk (#14), quarterback, junior, 6'0", 186 pounds
- Leon Mavity (#27), halfback, sophomore, 5'10", 179 pounds
- Chuck McBride (#88), end, senior, 6'1" 203 pounds
- Noble Milton (#32), fullback, sophomore, 6'0", 195 pounds
- Frank Montera (#11), quarterback, senior, 5'11", 180 pounds
- Jim Perkins (#74), tackle, senior, 6'5", 239 pounds
- Joe Romig (#67), guard and linebacker, senior, 5'10", 196 pounds
- Loren Schweninger (#31), fullback, senior, 6'0", 195 pounds
- Ted Somerville (#41), halfback, sophomore, 5'10", 181 pounds
- Gale Weidner (#10), quarterback, senior, 6'1", 184 pounds
- Ted Woods (#35), halfback, senior, 6'0", 196 pounds

=== Coaching staff ===
- Sonny Grandelius (head coach)
- Hohn Polonchek (assistant head coach)
- Chuck Boerio (linebackers)
- Bob Ghilotti (ends)
- Buck Nystrom (line)

== Recruiting controversy ==
In March 1962, Grandelius was fired by the university regents for recruiting violations, primarily due to the operation of a slush fund for players and families. Ten days later, alumni director Bud Davis was hired as the interim head coach; he had no collegiate coaching experience, just five years as a high school head coach. A month later, the NCAA put Colorado's football program on probation for two years; because the university began the investigation and took action, the penalties were relatively light.
