= Joseph Romig =

Joseph Romig may refer to:

- Joseph H. Romig (Joseph Herman Romig; 1872–1951), American frontier physician and missionary
- Joe Romig (Joseph Howard Romig; born 1941), American gridiron football player

== See also ==
- Romig
