= Romig =

Romig is a German surname. Notable people with the surname include:

- Drew Romig (b. 1998), American soccer player
- Edith Romig (1865–1933), American missionary
- Ella Mae Romig (1871–1936), wife of Joseph H. Romig
- Ethel Romig Fuller (born 1883 as Ethel Romig; died 1965), American poet and Oregon's third Poet Laureate
- James Romig (b. 1971), American composer
- Joe Romig (Joseph Howard Romig; born 1941), American gridiron football player, grandson of Joseph Herman Romig
- John Romig (1898–1984), American track and field athlete
- Joseph H. Romig (Joseph Herman Romig; 1872–1951), American frontier physician and missionary, husband of Ella Mae and grandfather of Joseph Howard Romig

== See also ==
- Romik
