= 1961 Oklahoma State Cowboys football team =

American college football season

1961 Oklahoma State Cowboys football
- Conference: Big Eight Conference
- Record: 4–6 (2–5 Big 8)
- Head coach: Cliff Speegle (7th season)
- MVPs: Jim Elliott; John Maisel
- Home stadium: Lewis Field

1961 Big Eight Conference football standings
	Conf.					Overall
Team	W		L		T	W		L		T
No. 7 Colorado $	7	–	0	–	0	9	–	2	–	0
No. 11 Missouri	5	–	2	–	0	7	–	2	–	1
Kansas	5	–	2	–	0	7	–	3	–	1
Oklahoma	4	–	3	–	0	5	–	5	–	0
Iowa State	3	–	4	–	0	5	–	5	–	0
Oklahoma State	2	–	5	–	0	4	–	6	–	0
Nebraska	2	–	5	–	0	3	–	6	–	1
Kansas State	0	–	7	–	0	2	–	8	–	0
$ – Conference champion; Rankings from AP Poll

The 1961 Oklahoma State Cowboys football team was an American football that represented Oklahoma State University (now known as Oklahoma State University–Stillwater) as a member of the Big Eight Conference (Big 8) during the 1961 college football season. In their seventh season under head coach Cliff Speegle, the Cowboys compiled a 4–6 record (2–5 in conference games), tied for sixth place in the Big 8, and were outscored by a total of 166 to 154.

The team played its home games at Lewis Field in Stillwater, Oklahoma.

== Schedule ==
Date	Opponent	Site	Result	Attendance	Source
September 23	at Iowa State	Clyde Williams Field; Ames, IA	L 7–14	16,848–18,000	
September 30	at Colorado	Folsom Field; Boulder, CO	L 0–24	40,000	
October 7	Tulsa*	Lewis Field; Stillwater, OK (rivalry)	W 26–0	18,500	
October 14	Missouri	Lewis Field; Stillwater, OK	L 0–10	18,500	
October 21	Nebraska^{†}	Lewis Field; Stillwater, OK	W 14–6	22,067	
October 28	at Kansas	Memorial Stadium; Lawrence, KS	L 8–42	25,000	
November 4	at Wichita*	Veterans Field; Wichita, KS	L 13–25	10,115	
November 18	Houston*	Lewis Field; Stillwater, OK	W 28–24	10,000	
November 25	Kansas State	Lewis Field; Stillwater, OK	W 45–0	7,500	
December 2	at Oklahoma	Owen Field; Norman, OK (Bedlam Series)	L 13–21	52,598	
*Non-conference game; ^{†}Homecoming

== Statistics ==
On offense, the 1961 team averaged 15.4 points scored, 191.2 rushing yards, and 64.3 passing yards per game. On defense, the team allowed an average of 16.6 points scored, 151.8 rushing yards, and 84.7 passing yards per game

Halfback Jim Dillard led the team in both total offense and rushing. He gained 627 rushing yards on 128 carries for four touchdowns and an average of 4.9 yards per carry. He also caught 14 passes for 71 yards.

Bill McFarland led the team in scoring with seven touchdowns for 42 points. He tallied 331 rushing yards on 82 carries for an average of 4.0 yards per carry.

Mike Miller was the team's leading passer, completing 37 of 86 passes (43.0%) for 371 yards with zero touchdowns, seven interceptions, and a 63.0 quarterback rating. Bill Leming was the number two quarterback, completing 21 of 49 passes (42.9%) for 205 yards with one touchdown, four interceptions, and a 68.4 quarterback rating.

Don Brewington was the team's leading receiver with 14 catches for 215 yards, an average of 15.4 yards per reception.

== Awards and honors ==
The team voted to select two players as the team's most valuable player. They selected senior quarterback Jim Elliott and senior defensive quarterback John Maisel.

No Oklahoma State players were selected as first-team players on the 1961 All-Big Eight Conference football team. Halfback Jim Dillard and tackle Frank Parker both received second-team honors from the Associated Press (AP) and United Press International (UPI).

== 1962 NFL draft ==
The 1962 NFL draft was held on December 4, 1961. The following two Oklahoma State players were selected:

Round	Pick	Player	Position	NFL club
4	51	Jim Dillard	Back	Baltimore Colts
7	98	Gary Cutsinger	Tackle	Green Bay Packers
