= 1961 Kansas Jayhawks football team =

American college football season

1961 Kansas Jayhawks football

Bluebonnet Bowl champion

Bluebonnet Bowl, W 33–7 vs. Rice
- Conference: Big Eight Conference

Ranking
- Coaches: No. 15
- Record: 7–3–1 (5–2 Big 8)
- Head coach: Jack Mitchell (4th season)
- Home stadium: Memorial Stadium

1961 Big Eight Conference football standings
	Conf.					Overall
Team	W		L		T	W		L		T
No. 7 Colorado $	7	–	0	–	0	9	–	2	–	0
No. 11 Missouri	5	–	2	–	0	7	–	2	–	1
Kansas	5	–	2	–	0	7	–	3	–	1
Oklahoma	4	–	3	–	0	5	–	5	–	0
Iowa State	3	–	4	–	0	5	–	5	–	0
Oklahoma State	2	–	5	–	0	4	–	6	–	0
Nebraska	2	–	5	–	0	3	–	6	–	1
Kansas State	0	–	7	–	0	2	–	8	–	0
$ – Conference champion; Rankings from AP Poll

The 1961 Kansas Jayhawks football team was an American football team represented the University of Kansas as a member of the Big Eight Conference (Big 8) during the 1961 college football season. In their fourth year under head coach Jack Mitchell, the Jayhawks compiled a 6–3–1 record (5–2 in conference games), finished in second place in the Big 8, and outscored opponents by a total of 269 to 88. They were ranked No. 15 in the final AP writers poll and UPI coaches poll.

After starting the season 0–2–1, the Jayhawks won six consecutive games. Highlights of the season included a 10–0 victory over Oklahoma (the Jayhawks' first victory over the Sooners since 1946), a 34–0 victory over in-state rival Kansas State, a 53–7 road victory over California, and a 33–7 postseason victory over Rice in the 1961 Bluebonnet Bowl.

Senior quarterback John Hadl led the team with 958 yards of total offense in the regular season and was selected by the Football Writers Association of America (FWAA) as a first-team All-American. He also received 33 first-place votes for the Heisman Trophy and was seventh in the balloting.

Kansas played its home games at Memorial Stadium in Lawrence, Kansas.

== Schedule ==
Date	Opponent	Rank	Site	TV	Result	Attendance	Source
September 23	at TCU*	No. 8	Amon G. Carter Stadium; Fort Worth, TX		L 16–17	27,000	
September 30	Wyoming*		Memorial Stadium; Lawrence, KS		T 6–6	33,000	
October 7	at Colorado		Folsom Field; Boulder, CO		L 19–20	42,700	
October 14	Iowa State		Memorial Stadium; Lawrence, KS		W 21–7	32,176–33,500	
October 21	at Oklahoma		Oklahoma Memorial Stadium; Norman, OK		W 10–0	54,794–57,000	
October 28	Oklahoma State		Memorial Stadium; Lawrence, KS		W 42–8	25,000	
November 4	at Nebraska		Memorial Stadium; Lincoln, NE (rivalry)		W 28–6	32,450–33,000	
November 11	Kansas State^{†}		Memorial Stadium; Lawrence, KS (rivalry)		W 34–0	34,000	
November 18	at California*		California Memorial Stadium; Berkeley, CA		W 53–7	30,000	
November 25	Missouri	No. 10	Memorial Stadium; Lawrence, KS (Border War)		L 7–10	40,500	
December 17	vs. Rice*		Rice Stadium; Houston, TX (Bluebonnet Bowl)	CBS	W 33–7	52,000	
*Non-conference game; ^{†}Homecoming; Rankings from AP Poll released prior to the game

== Statistics ==
The team gained an average of 254.0 rushing yards and 75.1 passing yards per game during the regular season. On defense, Kansas gave up an average of 126.6 rushing yards and 112.4 passing yards per game.

Quarterback John Hadl led the team with 958 yards of total offense. He completed 44 of 93 passes (47.3%) for 665 yards with seven touchdowns, six interceptions, and a 119.3 quarterback rating. He also had 293 rushing yards.

Halfback Curtis McClinton was the team's leading scorer (60 points), leading receiver (nine receptions for 151 yards), and ranked second in rushing (516 yards, 122 carries, 4.2-yards average).

Ken Coleman led the team in rushing yards (549 yards, 110 carries, 5.0-yard average), and Tony Leiker led the team in rushing yards per carry (27 carries for 248 yards, 9.2 yards per carry).

== Awards and honors ==
Quarterback John Hadl was selected a first-team All-American by the Football Writers Association of America (FWAA). He was named to the second team by the United Press International (UPI) and the third team by the Associated Press (AP). He also received 33 first-place votes and finished seventh in Heisman Trophy voting.

Four Kansas players were recognized by the AP or UPI on the 1961 All-Big Eight Conference football team: Hadl (AP-1, UPI-1); halfback Curtis McClinton (AP-1, UPI-1); guard Elvin Basham (AP-2, UPI-2); and center Kent Staub (AP-1, UPI-2).

== 1962 NFL draft ==
Player	Round	Pick	Position	Club
John Hadl	1	10	Quarterback	Detroit Lions
Bert Coan	7	85	Running back	Washington Redskins
Roger McFarland	20	274	Back	San Francisco 49ers
