= 1961 Missouri Tigers football team =

American college football season

1961 Missouri Tigers football
- Conference: Big Eight Conference

Ranking
- Coaches: No. 11
- AP: No. 11
- Record: 7–2–1 (5–2 Big 8)
- Head coach: Dan Devine (4th season)
- Captain: Paul Henley
- Home stadium: Memorial Stadium

1961 Big Eight Conference football standings
	Conf.					Overall
Team	W		L		T	W		L		T
No. 7 Colorado $	7	–	0	–	0	9	–	2	–	0
No. 11 Missouri	5	–	2	–	0	7	–	2	–	1
Kansas	5	–	2	–	0	7	–	3	–	1
Oklahoma	4	–	3	–	0	5	–	5	–	0
Iowa State	3	–	4	–	0	5	–	5	–	0
Oklahoma State	2	–	5	–	0	4	–	6	–	0
Nebraska	2	–	5	–	0	3	–	6	–	1
Kansas State	0	–	7	–	0	2	–	8	–	0
$ – Conference champion; Rankings from AP Poll

The 1961 Missouri Tigers football team was an American football team that represented the University of Missouri in the Big Eight Conference (Big 8) during the 1961 college football season. In their fourth year under head coach Dan Devine, the Tigers compiled a 7–2–1 record (5–2 in conference games), finished in a tie for second place in the Big 8, and outscored opponents by a total of 124 to 57.

Two games were decided based on Missouri's attempts for two-point conversions in the closing minutes:

- On October 7, the Tigers trailed, 14–6, in the closing minutes against California. They scored a touchdown with 7:36 remaining, and Daryl Krugman scrambled for a two-point conversion to tie the game.
- Four weeks later, they trailed, 7–0, to Colorado. Missouri scored a touchdown with 6:14 remaining. Seeking to take the lead, halfback Mike Hunter overthrew Conrad Hitchler on the two-point attempt. Missouri lost, 7–6.

Senior tackle Ed Blaine was selected as a first-team All-American. The team's statistical leaders included fullback Andy Russell with 412 rushing yards and quarterback Ron Taylor with 428 passing yards and 514 yards of total offense.

The team played its home games at Memorial Stadium in Columbia, Missouri.

== Schedule ==
Date	Opponent	Rank	Site	Result	Attendance	Source
September 23	Washington State*		Memorial Stadium; Columbia, MO	W 28–6	37,000	
September 30	at Minnesota*		Memorial Stadium; Minneapolis, MN	W 6–0	58,840	
October 7	California*		Memorial Stadium; Columbia, MO	T 14–14	42,000	
October 14	at Oklahoma State		Lewis Field; Stillwater, OK	W 10–0	18,500	
October 21	at Iowa State		Clyde Williams Field; Ames, IA (rivalry)	W 13–7	21,932	
October 28	Nebraska^{†}		Memorial Stadium; Columbia, MO (rivalry)	W 10–0	42,000	
November 4	at No. 8 Colorado	No. 10	Folsom Field; Boulder, CO	L 6–7	43,000	
November 11	Oklahoma	No. 10	Memorial Stadium; Columbia, MO (rivalry)	L 0–7	45,164	
November 18	Kansas State		Memorial Stadium; Columbia, MO	W 27–9	29,000	
November 25	at No. 10 Kansas		Memorial Stadium; Lawrence, KS (Border War)	W 10–7	40,500	
*Non-conference game; ^{†}Homecoming; Rankings from AP Poll released prior to the game

== Awards ==
Senior tackle Ed Blaine was selected as a first-team All-American by the Football Writers Association of America for Look magazine. Blaine was also chosen as a second-team All-American by the Associated Press (AP).

Five Missouri players were recognized on the 1961 All-Big Eight Conference football team: Blaine (AP-1, UPI-1); end Conrad Hitchler (AP-1, UPI-1); tackle Bill "Bucky" Wegener (AP-2, UPI-2); guard Paul Garvis (AP-2); and guard Paul Henley (UPI-2).

Team awards were presented to tackles Bucky Wegener and Ed Blaine as the outstanding linemen, and to quarterback Ron Taylor and halfback Normal Beal as the outstanding senior backs.

== Statistics ==
Missouri averaged 177.6 rushing yards, 67.7 passing yards, and 12.4 points per game. On defense, they gave up an average of 107.8 rushing yards, 69.2 passing yards, and 5.7 points per game.

The team's rushing leaders were Andy Russell (412 yards, 100 carries), Norman Beal (287 yards, 57 carries), Bill Tobin (236 yards, 87 carries), and Paul Underhill (177 yards, 42 carries). The team's passing leaders were Ron Taylor (31 of 62, 428 yards, zero touchdowns, six interceptions) and Mike Hunter (9 of 20, 162 yards, four touchdowns, one interception). The team's receiving leaders were Conrad Hitchler (8 receptions, 124 yards) and Andy Russell (7 receptions, 100 yards). The scoring leaders were Ron Taylor (24 points) and Bill Tobin (18 points).

== Players ==
At the end of the 1961 season, the following 31 players received varsity letters for their participation on the football team.

- Norm Beal, halfback, 5-11, 171 pounds, senior
- Ed Blaine, tackle, 6-2, 217 pounds, senior
- Carl Crawford, halfback, 5-11, 186 pounds, junior
- Paul Garvis, guard, 5-9, 201 pounds, senior
- Mack Gilchrist, fullback, 5-11, 198 pounds, sophomore
- Paul Henley, guard, 6-0, 215 pounds, senior
- Thomas Hertz, guard, 5-10, 216 pounds, junior
- Conrad Hitchler, end, 6-3, 206 pounds, junior
- Mike Hunter, halfback, 6-1, 194 pounds, junior
- Jim Johnson, quarterback, 6-3, 213 pounds, junior
- Daryl Krugman, halfback, 5-9, 190 pounds, sophomore
- Bill McCartney, center, 6-1, 206 pounds, senior
- Larry Nichols, end, 6-2, 200 pounds, junior
- Gene Oliver, guard, 6-0, 191 pounds, sophomore
- Jackie Palmer, end, 6-0, 194 pounds, junior
- Roger Phillips, center, 5-11, 193 pounds, junior
- Andy Russell, fullback, 6-2, 201 pounds, junior
- Fred Schueler, guard, 6-0, 205 pounds, senior
- George Seals, tackle, 6-2, 235 pounds, sophomore
- John Sevcik, end, 6-1, 214 pounds, sophomore
- Bill Siekierski, tackle, 6-2, 223 pounds, junior
- Thomas Smith, guard, 5-11, 202 pounds, senior
- Gerald Stevenson, halfback, 6-3, 192 pounds, sophomore
- Ron Taylor, quarterback, 5-8, 174 pounds, senior
- Bill Tobin, fullback, 5-11, 193 pounds, junior
- Vince Turner, halfback, 5-10, 177 pounds, sophomore
- Paul Underhill, halfback, 6-0, 202 pounds, sophomore
- James Vermillion, center, 5-10, 184 pounds, junior
- Don Wainwright, end, 6-2, 200 pounds, junior
- Jerome Wallach, tackle, 6-2, 205 pounds, junior
- William "Bucky" Wegener, tackle, 5-10, 225 pounds, senior

Twenty other players were named provisional letter winners, "pending their performance in spring football drills."
