= 1961 Nebraska Cornhuskers football team =

American college football season

1961 Nebraska Cornhuskers football
- Conference: Big Eight Conference
- Record: 3–6–1 (2–5 Big 8)
- Head coach: Bill Jennings (5th season)
- Offensive scheme: Wing T
- Home stadium: Memorial Stadium

1961 Big Eight Conference football standings
	Conf.					Overall
Team	W		L		T	W		L		T
No. 7 Colorado $	7	–	0	–	0	9	–	2	–	0
No. 11 Missouri	5	–	2	–	0	7	–	2	–	1
Kansas	5	–	2	–	0	7	–	3	–	1
Oklahoma	4	–	3	–	0	5	–	5	–	0
Iowa State	3	–	4	–	0	5	–	5	–	0
Oklahoma State	2	–	5	–	0	4	–	6	–	0
Nebraska	2	–	5	–	0	3	–	6	–	1
Kansas State	0	–	7	–	0	2	–	8	–	0
$ – Conference champion; Rankings from AP Poll

The 1961 Nebraska Cornhuskers football team was an American football team that represented the University of Nebraska (now known as the University of Nebraska–Lincoln) as a member of the Big Eight Conference (Big 8) during the 1961 college football season. In their fifth and final year under head coach Bill Jennings, the Cornhuskers compiled a 3–6–1 record (2–5 in conference games), tied for sixth place out of eight teams in the Big 8, and were outscored by a total of 135 to 119.

Fullback Bill "Thunder" Thornton led the team in both rushing (618 yards) and scoring (30 points).

The team lost six of its last seven games, including losses to rivals Missouri (0–10), Kansas ( 6–28), Colorado (0–7), and Oklahoma (14–21). On November 30, 1961, five days after the team's loss to Oklahoma, Jennings was fired as Nebraska's head coach. Nebraska had a losing record each of its five years under Jennings, compiling an overall record of 15–34–1 (8–24 in conference games). Bob Devaney was hired as Nebraska's 25th head football coach in January 1962. After the 1961 season, Nebraska did not have another season with a losing record until 2004.

The Cornhuskers played their home games at Memorial Stadium in Lincoln, Nebraska.

== Schedule ==
Date	Time	Opponent	Site	Result	Attendance	Source
September 23	2:00 pm	North Dakota*	Memorial Stadium	W 33–0	25,129	
September 30	2:00 pm	Arizona*	Memorial Stadium; Lincoln, NE	T 14–14	34,721	
October 7	1:30 pm	at Kansas State	Memorial Stadium; Manhattan, KS (rivalry)	W 24–0	17,515	
October 14	2:00 pm	Syracuse*	Memorial Stadium; Lincoln, NE	L 6–28	35,387	
October 21	1:30 pm	at Oklahoma State	Lewis Field; Stillwater, OK	L 6–14	22,067	
October 28	1:30 pm	at Missouri	Memorial Stadium; Columbia, MO (rivalry)	L 0–10	42,292	
November 4	2:00 pm	Kansas^{†}	Memorial Stadium; Lincoln, NE (rivalry)	L 6–28	32,450–33,000	
November 11	1:30 pm	at Iowa State	Clyde Williams Field; Ames, IA (rivalry)	W 16–13	12,000–13,106	
November 18	2:00 pm	No. 8 Colorado	Memorial Stadium; Lincoln, NE (rivalry)	L 0–7	26,000–28,108	
November 25	2:00 pm	Oklahoma	Memorial Stadium; Lincoln, NE (rivalry)	L 14–21	25,000–26,139	
*Non-conference game; ^{†}Homecoming; Rankings from AP Poll released prior to the game; All times are in Central time

== Game summaries ==
=== North Dakota ===
Team	1	2	Total
North Dakota			0
• Nebraska			33

- Date: September 23
- Location: Memorial Stadium • Lincoln, Nebraska
- Game attendance: 25,129

The Cornhuskers came out with a roar to open 1961, racking up 33 unanswered points without a serious challenge from the visiting Fighting Sioux. The overmatched North Dakota squad managed only five first downs all day, and suffered the first shutout dealt by Nebraska since a 16–0 blanking given to Kansas State in 1955. This was the only time these teams met on the field until 2022.

=== Arizona ===
Team	1	2	Total
Arizona			14
Nebraska			14

- Date: September 30
- Location: Memorial Stadium • Lincoln, Nebraska
- Game attendance: 34,721

Nebraska and Arizona met for the first time in a closely fought battle. For every Cornhusker score, the Wildcats answered. No spectacular plays stood out on the day, just consistent production which was enough to hold on through most of the game. As the final seconds ticked away, Arizona landed on the Nebraska 27 yard line and scrambled to set up for a field goal, but time expired before they could run the play. The 14–14 final was Nebraska's first tie since a 21–21 split decision to Illinois in 1953. It is also the Cornhuskers' last tie at Memorial Stadium; all subsequent ties prior to the adoption of overtime in 1996 occurred on the road, the last at Colorado in 1991.

=== Kansas State ===
Team	1	2	Total
• Nebraska			24
Kansas State			0

- Date: October 7
- Location: Memorial Stadium • Manhattan, Kansas
- Game attendance: 17,515

The Cornhuskers rolled unchallenged over the Wildcats with a punishing ground attack. Newcomer HB Willie Ross scored the first touchdown of his career on a one-yard push, and then put in two more before the time expired. It was the first loss handed to Kansas State on the year. The shutout victory was Nebraska's third unbeaten game in a row, which had not happened since 1955, and was the first time the Cornhuskers had opened a season with three unbeaten games since 1952. Nebraska's historic domination of Kansas State now stood at 34–9–2.

=== Syracuse ===
Team	1	2	Total
• Syracuse			28
Nebraska			6

- Date: October 14
- Location: Memorial Stadium • Lincoln, Nebraska
- Game attendance: 35,387

Riding an early wave of success, and mindful of their pattern of good fortune when going into a game as a serious underdog, Nebraska welcomed Syracuse into Lincoln in a bid to upset one of the highest-ranked teams of the east. The Orangemen proved to be a formidable opponent, playing relatively error-free football so as to not hand the game over to the Cornhuskers. Two costly interceptions that were converted into touchdowns also hurt Nebraska, and Syracuse dealt the first defeat of the Cornhuskers season. It was the third win in a row for the Orangemen over Nebraska, as they improved to 6–4–0 in the series. Syracuse finished the season at #14 in the AP Poll.

=== Oklahoma State ===
Team	1	2	Total
Nebraska			6
• Oklahoma State			14

- Date: October 21
- Location: Lewis Field • Stillwater, Oklahoma
- Game attendance: 22,067

The Cornhuskers made their first ever appearance in Stillwater against second-year Big 8 newcomer Oklahoma State. The Cornhuskers scored first, but further efforts were soon enough halted by a stiff Cowboy defensive effort. In the third quarter, Nebraska turned over a demoralizing fumble on their own 1-yard line to help Oklahoma State go ahead 7–0. The Cowboys then ground out a long, sustained drive over most of the final period to put in one more score to seal the game. The Cowboys remained perfect over the Cornhuskers in both attempts.

Nebraska did not lose again to Oklahoma State until 2002, going 35–0–1 over that span (the Cornhuskers and Cowboys tied 10–10 at Stillwater in 1973).

=== Missouri ===
Team	1	2	3	4	Total
Nebraska	0	0	0	0	0
• Missouri	0	0	3	7	10

- Date: October 28
- Location: Memorial Stadium, Columbia, Missouri
- Game attendance: 42,292

Top notch defensive stands defined the first half of the game as both teams fought to a scoreless draw at the half. The Tigers managed to finally get a field goal in to open the scoreboard in the third quarter, and the Cornhuskers were unable to answer. A fourth-quarter touchdown put the game away as Nebraska suffered the season's second loss. It was Missouri's fifth straight decision in the series as they improved to 23–28–3 and kept the Missouri-Nebraska Bell another year. The Tigers finished the season ranked number 11 in the AP Poll at 7–2–1, and placed 2nd in the Big 8.

=== Kansas ===
Team	1	2	Total
• Kansas			28
Nebraska			6

- Date: November 4
- Location: Memorial Stadium • Lincoln, Nebraska
- Game attendance: 32,450

Nebraska's early success out of the gate turned into another spiral into oblivion when Kansas brought an efficient and productive offense to town. The Cornhuskers were unable to answer as the Jawhawks ran out to a two-touchdown lead by the half. A single touchdown in the second half, followed by a failed two-point conversion, was the only feeble response that Nebraska could muster. Kansas was still only 18–43–3 in the series, but Nebraska's 3–0 start was now 3–4 and headed the wrong way.

=== Iowa State ===
Team	1	2	Total
• Nebraska			16
Iowa State			13

- Date: November 11
- Location: Clyde Williams Field • Ames, Iowa
- Game attendance: 12,971

The score was closer than the game seemed to be played, as Nebraska rolled up yards with relative ease. HB Bill Thornton accumulated more rushing yards than the entire Cyclone team. Iowa State didn't just give the game away, however, battling the Cornhuskers to a hard-earned 13–13 tie as time was running out. Finally, with just eight seconds remaining, PK Ron Meade put the ball through the uprights for 3 and a Nebraska win. The Cornhuskers continued to own the series, 43–11–1.

=== Colorado ===
Team	1	2	3	4	Total
• #8 Colorado	0	0	7	0	7
Nebraska	0	0	0	0	0

- Location: Memorial Stadium, Lincoln, Nebraska
- Game attendance: 28,108

A cold and wet day with melting snow on the ground saw the #8 Buffaloes out to prove their ranking and avoid the typical Nebraska upset of highly ranked teams. True to their ranking, Colorado completely stifled every offensive effort attempted by the Cornhuskers. It was only due to the poor on-field conditions that sustained Buffalo drives repeatedly failed to produce points. Though the win was decided by a single touchdown, the visiting team from Boulder completely outplayed Nebraska. Colorado's defense denied the Cornhuskers any first downs or completed passes through the entire game, for only the second time in the history of the program back to 1890. The triumphant Buffaloes took a 10–9–1 series lead. Colorado went on to finish the season ranked #7 by the AP Poll at 9–2 and claiming the Big 8 title before losing 7–25 to the #4 LSU Tigers in the Orange Bowl.

=== Oklahoma ===
Team	1	2	Total
• Oklahoma			21
Nebraska			14

- Date: November 25
- Location: Memorial Stadium • Lincoln, Nebraska
- Game attendance: 26,139

The final game of the season was a tale of two different games. The first half was a 14–0 Nebraska domination as the struggling Sooners looked like they would fall to the Cornhuskers for the third straight game in the series. Oklahoma Head Coach Bud Wilkinson apparently made an effective plea during the halftime break, as the Sooners emerged a changed team for the second half. All Nebraska offense was stymied from that point on, as Oklahoma tallied 21 straight to come back and salvage their season at 5–5. The Oklahoma comeback helped them recover the lead in the series at 19–18–3, a lead that they would never relinquish.

== Personnel ==
=== Roster ===
Official Roster
63 Bishop, Corwin LG (So.); 22 Bonistall, Ernie QB (Jr.); 70 Brown, Robert RT (So.); 64 Brown, Ulysses LG (So.); 80 Callahan, Richard E (So.); 62 Carlson, Dwain LG (Jr.); 44 Clare, Patrick HB (Sr.); 24 Claridge, Dennis QB (So.); 41 Clay, Bernie HB (Jr.); 73 Cobb, Archie RT (Jr.); 33 Comstock, William FB (Jr.); 81 Doepke, Charles E (So.); 87 Donovan, Larry E (Jr.); 53 Drum, Duncan C (So.); 61 Dyer, Dallas LG (Sr.); 21 Faiman, John QB (Jr.); 76 Fischer, Allen (Richard) RT (Jr.); 86 Fisher, Pat E (So.); 55 Garner, Chuck C (So.); 23 Gilbreath, Ron QB (So.); 47 Griesse, Ronald RG (So.); 50 Haney, George C (Sr.); 85 Huge, James E (Jr.); 69 Johnson, LaVane RG (So.); 12 Johnson, Rudy HB (So.); 74 Jones, Robert LT (Jr.); 77 Kiffin, Monte LT (So.); 68 Kirby, John LG (So.)	75 Kramer, Larry LT (So.); 10 Little, Jim QB (So.); 32 Martin, Noel FB (Sr.); 89 McDaniel, Richard E (Sr.); 20 Meade, Ron QB (Sr.); 54 Michka, Ron C (Jr.); 72 Mitchell, Ed LT (So.); 35 Olsen, Steve FB (So.); 78 Osentowski, Clarence RT (So.); 15 Powers, Warren HB (Jr.); 82 Purcell, Donald E (Sr.); 65 Robertson, Tyrone RG (Jr.); 66 Rood, Jed RG (Jr.); 17 Ross, Willie HB (So.); 88 Salerno, Patrick E (Sr.); 52 Sittler, Lyle C (So.); 42 Smidt, Maynard HB (So.); 79 Stevenson, Donald RT (Jr.); 16 Stuewe, Dennis HB (Jr.); 43 Stukel, Cal HB (So.); 30 Thornton, Bill HB (Jr.); 51 Tingelhoff, Mick C (Sr.); 83 Tomlinson, Larry E (Jr.); 67 Toogood, Gary RG (Sr.); 71 Voss, Lloyd RT (So.); 45 Ward, Gene FB (Sr.); 48 Williams, Pete RG (So.); 31 Young, Gene FB (So.)

== 1961 start of season depth chart ==
Defense by committee
HB	HB
	LB / LB
CB	DE / DT / NT / DT / DE	CB

Offensive starters

LE
Donald Purcell
James Huge
Richard Callahan

LG	C	RG	LT	RT
Dwaine Carlson	Mick Tingelhoff	Tyrone Robertson	Robert Jones	Bob Brown
Dallas Dyer	George Haney	Monte Kiffin	Larry Toogood	Ai Fischer
John Kirby	Ron Michka	Jed Rood	Monte Kiffin	Lloyd Voss

RE
Pat Salerno
Richard McDaniel
Charles Doepke

QB
Dennis Claridge
John Faiman
Ron Gilbreath

LB	RB	FB
Bill Thornton	Patrick Clare	William Comstock
Bernie Clay	Willie Ross	Rudy Johnson
Warren Powers	Dennis Stuewe	Gene Ward

== 1961 Final depth chart ==
Defense by committee
HB	HB
	LB / LB
CB	DE / DT / NT / DT / DE	CB

Offensive starters

LE
Donald Purcell
James Huge

LG	C	RG	LT	RT
Dallas Dyer	Mick Tingelhoff	Tyrone Robertson (injured); Dwaine Carlson	Larry Toogood	Lloyd Voss; Bob Brown (injured)
John Kirby	George Haney	Jed Rood	Monte Kiffin	AI Fischer

RE
Richard McDaniel
Pat Salerno

QB
Dennis Claridge
Ron Meade

LB	RB	FB
Rudy Johnson	Willie Miller	Bill Thornton
Richard Callahan	Dennis Stuewe	William Comstock

=== Coaching staff ===
Name	Title	First year in this position	Years at Nebraska	Alma mater
Bill Jennings	Head coach	1957	1956–1961	Oklahoma
Don Scarbrough	Assistant coach	1956	1956–1961	
Dick Monroe		1957	1957–1961	
LeRoy Pearce		1958	1958–1961	
Cletus Fischer		1960	1960–1985	Nebraska
George Kelly		1960	1960–1968	
Jack Braley		1960	1960–1961	Nebraska

== Future professional players ==
- Brown, Robert, 1964 2nd-round pick of the Philadelphia Eagles
- Dennis Claridge, 1963 3rd-round pick of the Green Bay Packers
- Bob Jones, 1964 18th-round pick of the Washington Redskins
- Monte Kiffin, 1964 15th-round pick of the Minnesota Vikings
- Larry Kramer, 1964 15th-round pick of the Baltimore Colts
- Bill (Thunder) Thornton, 1963 5th-round pick of the St. Louis Cardinals
- Mick Tingelhoff, Minnesota Vikings
- Willie Ross, 1964 9th-round pick of the St. Louis Cardinals
