= 1961 Iowa State Cyclones football team =

American college football season

1961 Iowa State Cyclones football
- Conference: Big Eight Conference
- Record: 5–5 (3–4 Big 8)
- Head coach: Clay Stapleton (4th season)
- Captain: John Cooper
- Home stadium: Clyde Williams Field

1961 Big Eight Conference football standings
	Conf.					Overall
Team	W		L		T	W		L		T
No. 7 Colorado $	7	–	0	–	0	9	–	2	–	0
No. 11 Missouri	5	–	2	–	0	7	–	2	–	1
Kansas	5	–	2	–	0	7	–	3	–	1
Oklahoma	4	–	3	–	0	5	–	5	–	0
Iowa State	3	–	4	–	0	5	–	5	–	0
Oklahoma State	2	–	5	–	0	4	–	6	–	0
Nebraska	2	–	5	–	0	3	–	6	–	1
Kansas State	0	–	7	–	0	2	–	8	–	0
$ – Conference champion; Rankings from AP Poll

The 1961 Iowa State Cyclones football team was an American football team that represented Iowa State University in the Big Eight Conference (Big 8) during the 1961 college football season. In their fourth year under head coach Clay Stapleton, the Cyclones compiled a 5–5 record (3–4 in conference games), finished in fifth place in the Big 8, and outscored their opponents by a total of 151 to 133.

Iowa State halfback Dave Hoppmann led the country with 1,638 yards off total offense. Hoppman also led the team with 920 rushing yards, 718 passing yards, and 30 points (five touchdowns). Two Iowa State players were selected as first-team all-conference players: Hoppmann and right guard Dan Celoni.

The team played its home games at Clyde Williams Field in Ames, Iowa. The stadium's seating capacity was expanded with the addition of 4,500 new permanent seats prior to the 1961 season. A new double-deck press box was also added as part of the renovation.

== Schedule ==
Date	Time	Opponent	Site	Result	Attendance	Source
September 16	1:30 pm	at Drake*	Drake Stadium; Des Moines, IA	W 21–0	12,465	
September 23	1:30 pm	Oklahoma State	Clyde Williams Field; Ames, IA	W 14–7	16,848–18,000	
October 7	2:00 pm	at Oklahoma	Oklahoma Memorial Stadium; Norman, OK	W 21–15	45,365	
October 14	1:30 pm	at Kansas	Memorial Stadium; Lawrence, KS	L 7–21	32,176–33,500	
October 21	1:30 pm	Missouri^{†}	Clyde Williams Field; Ames, IA (rivalry)	L 7–13	21,932	
October 28	1:30 pm	Kansas State^{†}	Clyde Williams Field; Ames, IA (rivalry)	W 31–7	18,475–20,000	
November 4	12:30 pm	at Boston College*	Alumni Stadium; Chestnut Hill, MA	L 10–14	17,600	
November 11	1:30 pm	Nebraska	Clyde Williams Field; Ames, IA (rivalry)	L 13–16	12,000–13,106	
November 18	1:30 pm	at Tulsa*	Skelly Stadium; Tulsa, OK	W 27–6	6,660	
November 25	2:30 pm	at No. 7 Colorado	Folsom Field; Boulder, CO	L 0–34	30,399	
*Non-conference game; ^{†}Homecoming; Rankings from AP Poll released prior to the game; All times are in Central time

== Personnel ==
=== Players ===
- Don Anderson - tackle, junior, 245 pounds
- J.W. Burden - halfback, 181 pounds
- Don Celoni - guard, senior, 203 pounds
- Jim Clapper - quarterback, 181 pounds
- Ozzie Clay - tailback, sophomore
- Dave Clayberg - fullback, 171 pounds
- John Cooper - team captain
- Tom Graham - tackle, senior, 6'2", 213 pounds
- Bruce Grasser - tackle, 196 pounds
- Dave Hoover - tailback, sophomore, 172 pounds
- Dave Hoppmann - tailback
- Ray Horkey, end, 180 pounds
- Dave Limerick - wingback
- Larry Montre - end, 6'4"
- Carl Proto - guard, 190 pounds
- Larry Schreiber - end, 180 pounds
- Jon Spelman - center, 192 pounds
- Steve Sturek - end
- Paul Sullivan - quarterback
- Scott Tieke - end, 200 pounds
- Dick Walton - tackle, 6'2", 224 pounds
