= 1962 All-Big Ten Conference football team =

American college football all-star team

The 1962 All-Big Ten Conference football team consists of American football players chosen by various organizations for All-Big Ten Conference teams for the 1962 Big Ten Conference football season.

== All-Big Ten selections ==
=== Quarterbacks ===
- Ron Vander Kelen, Wisconsin (AP-1; UPI-1)
- Tom Myers (AP-2; UPI-2)
- Duane Blaska, Minnesota (AP-3)
- Ron DiGravio, Purdue (UPI-3)

=== Halfbacks ===
- George Saimes, Michigan State (AP-1; UPI-1 [fullback])
- Paul Warfield, Ohio State (AP-1; UPI-1)
- Marv Woodson, Indiana (AP-1; UPI-2)
- Larry Ferguson, Iowa (AP-2; UPI-1)
- Sherman Lewis, Michigan State (AP-2)
- Paul Flatley, Northwestern (UPI-2)
- Lou Holland, Wisconsin (AP-3; UPI-3)
- Bill Munsey, Minnesota (AP-3; UPI-3)

=== Fullbacks ===
- Roy Walker, Purdue (AP-2; UPI-2)
- Dave Francis, Ohio State (AP-3)
- Jerry Jones, Minnesota (UPI-3)

=== Ends ===
- Pat Richter, Wisconsin (AP-1; UPI-1)
- John Campbell, Minnesota (AP-1; UPI-1)
- Paul Flatley, Northwestern (AP-2)
- Bob Prawdzik, Minnesota (AP-2)
- Matt Snell, Ohio State (UPI-2)
- Matt Snorton, Michigan State (UPI-2)
- Ernie Clark, Michigan State (UPI-3)
- Thurman Walker, Illinois (UPI-3)
- Don Carlson, Wisconsin (AP-3)
- Forest Farmer, Purdue (AP-3)

=== Tackles ===
- Bobby Bell, Minnesota (AP-1; UPI-1)
- Don Brumm, Purdue (AP-1; UPI-1)
- Carl Eller, Minnesota (AP-2; UPI-2)
- Roger Pillath, Wisconsin (AP-2; UPI-3)
- Bob Vogel, Ohio State (AP-3; UPI-2)
- Ed Budde, Michigan State (AP-3 [guard]; UPI-3)
- Daryl Sanders, Ohio State (AP-3; UPI-3)

=== Guards ===
- Jack Cvercko, Northwestern (AP-1; UPI-1)
- Julian J. Hook, Minnesota (AP-1; UPI-1)
- Steve Underwood, Wisconsin (AP-2; UPI-3)
- Jim Schenk, Wisconsin (AP-2; UPI-3)
- Gary Moeller, Ohio State (UPI-2)
- Earl McQuiston, Iowa (UPI-2)
- Wally Hilgenberg, Iowa (AP-3)

=== Centers ===
- Dave Behrman, Michigan State (AP-1; UPI-3)
- Bill Armstrong, Ohio State (AP-2; UPI-1)
- Dick Butkus, Illinois (AP-3; UPI-2)

== Key ==
AP = Associated Press

UPI = United Press International

Bold = Consensus first-team selection by both the AP and UPI

== See also ==
- 1962 College Football All-America Team
