= George Saimes =

American football player (1941–2013)

No. 24, 26
- Position: Safety

Personal information
- Born: September 1, 1941; Canton, Ohio, U.S.
- Died: March 8, 2013 (aged 71); Canton, Ohio, U.S.
- Listed height: 5 ft 11 in (1.80 m)
- Listed weight: 186 lb (84 kg)

Career information
- High school: Lincoln (Canton)
- College: Michigan State (1959-1962)
- NFL draft: 1963: 6th round, 71st overall pick
- AFL draft: 1963: 6th round, 48th overall pick

Career history
- Buffalo Bills (1963–1969); Denver Broncos (1970–1972)

Awards and highlights
- 2× AFL champion (1964, 1965); 3× First-team All-AFL (1964, 1965, 1967); 2× Second-team All-AFL (1966, 1968); 5× AFL All-Star (1964–1968); AFL All-Time Team; Buffalo Wall of Fame; Buffalo Bills 50th Anniversary Team; Consensus All-American (1962); Third-team All-American (1961); 2× First-team All-Big Ten (1961–1962)

Career NFL/AFL statistics
- Interceptions: 22
- Fumble recoveries: 4
- Sacks: 9
- Stats at Pro Football Reference

George Thomas Saimes (September 1, 1941 – March 8, 2013) was an American professional football player who was a defensive back for the Buffalo Bills of the American Football League (AFL). He was selected an AFL All-Star five consecutive seasons. In 1970, the Pro Football Hall of Fame named Saimes to the American Football League All-Time Team, at safety. He played college football as a fullback, defensive back and "rover back" for the Michigan State Spartans. He was a consensus All-American running back his senior year at Michigan State. He won AFL championships with the Bills in 1964 and 1965. After retiring, he scouted college football for NFL teams.

== Early life ==
Saimes was born on September 1, 1941, in Canton, Ohio. Both of his parents were Greek immigrants. His father Tom Saimes came to Canton in 1920, and worked as a cobbler. Saimes attended Lincoln High School in Canton, where he was a good student; graduating in 1959.

Saimes played football at Lincoln. He was an All-County first team selection in football. He also started on the school's basketball team. In 1959, the basketball team was 20–4 and went to its district's finals. He won four letters in track, two in football and two in basketball at Lincoln. He was a high and low hurdler and pole vaulter on the track team. He was All-Ohio in both football and basketball.

== College career ==
Saimes attended Michigan State University. He was a two-way player on the Spartans football team in the Big Ten Conference, and would become the Spartans most valuable player in 1961 and 1962.

Saimes was a fullback on offense and a defensive back. Michigan State head coach Duffy Daugherty said Saimes was equally valuable to the team on both offense and defense; and defensive backfield coach Dan Boisture considered Saimes the team's best defensive back. Michigan State's offensive coach Bill Yeoman said Saimes was "the perfect football player in that he has speed, balance, strength, desire, fine blocking and tackling ability–and what's more he's thinking all the time". Saimes was also known to his coaches for keeping himself superbly conditioned, and was considered the best conditioned player on the team. Daugherty said Saimes was "the only guy I've ever seen who actually increased his speed afoot through personal effort".

As a sophomore (1960), Saimes had 160 rushing yards (5.0 yards per carry) with one touchdown, and four receptions for 32 yards. The following season, in an October 21, 1961 game against Notre Dame University, Saimes made key tackles on defense; and had two touchdown runs of 24 and 25 yards within three minutes of each other in the second half, in the Spartans 17–7 win over the Fighting Irish. United Press International (UPI) named Saimes its Midwest Back of the Week for his play in that game.

Overall in his junior season, Saimes led the Spartans in rushing with 451 yards (5.5 yards per carry), scoring (eight touchdowns), and minutes played (301 out of a possible 540). Saimes was named first-team All-Big Ten as a running back. The Spartans finished the season 7–2, and were ranked eighth by the Associated Press (AP) at the end of 1961 season.

Saimes was team captain as a senior in 1962. Daugherty also made Saimes his "rover back" on defense, allowing Saimes to make his own decisions on how he would defend plays. He led the Big Ten Conference in rushing with 642 yards (5.3 yards per carry) and nine rushing touchdowns. He also caught four passes for 46 yards. The AP selected Saimes as a first-team All-American at running back. He was a first-team selection to the College Football All-Star Team by the American Football Coaches Association. He was again first-team All-Big Ten. Saimes was seventh in the voting for the Heisman Trophy, and was a consensus All-American. He was selected to play in the East-West Shrine Game. He was also selected to play in the June 1963 All-America game in Buffalo. Saimes chose not to play in the Chicago College All-Star Game, believing it would set him back in training camp with the Buffalo Bills.

== Professional career ==
=== Buffalo Bills ===
The Dallas Texans (later known as the Kansas City Chiefs) selected Saimes in the sixth round of the 1963 AFL draft, 48th overall. The Los Angeles Rams drafted Saimes with the first pick in the sixth round of the 1963 NFL draft, 71st overall. Buffalo Bills owner Ralph Wilson met Saimes at the wedding of Saimes' MSU teammate Dave Behrman, the Bills' first round draft choice that year. Wilson was sufficiently impressed during his wedding conversation with Saimes, that Wilson asked Saimes if he would like to play for the Bills, and Saimes said he would. Soon after, Wilson contacted Texans' owner Lamar Hunt, and the Texans traded Saimes to the Bills for a 1964 high draft pick. In December 1962, Saimes signed a contract to play for the Bills.

Saimes teammates in Buffalo called him the "Golden Greek". While aggressive, reckless and exuberant as a player, off the field he was quiet and thoughtful, with reading habits that focused on topics such as philosophy and political science. He pursued an advance degree during his earliest years with the Bills. While with the Bills he excelled at the "safety blitz".

As a rookie in 1963, Saimes was primarily used as a defensive back at free safety. Because of injuries to Bills' running backs, Saimes did play at running back during the first two games of his rookie season. In his first game, he rushed for 40 yards in 10 carries and had three receptions for 12 yards; and in the Bills' second game that season, Saimes had one yard in two rushing attempts and three receptions for 11 yards. He started 11 games at free safety, with four interceptions and one quarterback sack. The Bills won the AFL's East Division with a 7–6–1 record, and lost to the Boston Patriots in the divisional round of the playoffs, 26–8. Saimes was the Bills' starting free safety in that game.

In 1964, Saimes started all 14 Bills' games at free safety. He had a career-high six interceptions and career-high four quarterback sacks. In a December 14 game against the Denver Broncos, Saimes' safety blitzes and quarterback sacks disrupted the Broncos' offense, the Bills winning 30–19, with Saimes selected as the Bills most valuable player in the game. In the season's final game the following week against the 10–2–1 Boston Patriots, Saimes made a number of excellent plays in the secondary, including an interception that stopped a Patriots threat, in the Bills' 24–14 win.

In 1964, Saimes earned the first of five American Football League All-Star Game selections, when he was chosen to play in the 1964 season's AFL All-Star Game. He was named first-team All-AFL by the Associated Press, and second-team All-AFL by the Newspaper Enterprise Association (NEA) and United Press International. He also made The Sporting News All-AFL Team in 1964. The Bills were 12–2, finishing first in the AFL East Division.

The Bills defeated the San Diego Chargers in the 1964 AFL championship game, 20–7, with Saimes starting at free safety. Over a 14-game schedule, the Bills' 1964 defense led the AFL in fewest points allowed (242), fewest total yards (3,878), fewest rushing yards (913), fewest rushing first downs allowed (48), fewest rushing yards per game (65.2) and per attempt (3.0), and fewest rushing touchdowns (4). The 918 rushing yards allowed was an AFL record, and over the 1964 and 1965 seasons, the Bills went 17 games without giving up a rushing touchdown.

In 1965, Saimes started 13 games for the Bills, playing both free and strong safety. He had the key play in an October 17 win over the Kansas City Chiefs, when he caused a fumble by quarterback Pete Beathard on a safety blitz, recovered the fumble and returned it 18 yards for a touchdown. He also had four interceptions that season. The Bills won the East Division with a 10–3–1 record, and defeated the Chargers again in the AFL championship game, 23–0. Saimes had a quarterback sack in the championship game. In 1965, he was again selected to play in the AFL All-Star Game and was named first-team All-AFL by the AP, UPI and NEA. He also made The Sporting News All-AFL Team in 1965.

In 1966, Saimes started 13 games at free safety, with one interception that season. He was selected to play in the AFL All-Star Game for the third consecutive season. The Sporting News named him first-team All-AFL, and UPI and NEA named him second-team All-AFL. The Bills were 9–4–1, and again finished first in the East Division. They lost in the 1966 AFL championship game to the Chiefs, 31–7.

In 1967, the Bills fell to 4–10. Saimes started 13 games at free safety, with two interceptions. He was selected to play in the All-Star Game for a fourth consecutive season. He was named first-team All-AFL by The Sporting News, AP, NEA and UPI. The Bills were 1–12–1 the following season (1968). Saimes started 12 games between free and strong safety. He had two interceptions, three fumble recoveries and two quarterback sacks. He was named to the East All-Star Team for the fifth consecutive season. He was selected second-team All-AFL by The Sporting News and UPI.

Saimes suffered a left knee injury in a November 2 game against the Chiefs during the 1969 Bills' season, that finished his season after starting eight games. Before that, he had three interceptions and two sacks. He was replaced by Pete Richardson at free safety after being injured. After playing out his option, Saimes re-signed with the Bills on August 20, 1970. The Bills waived Saimes on September 8, before the start of the 1970 season. Coach John Rauch released Saimes along with two other veterans who had been starters in 1969, Al Bemiller and Harry Jacobs.

In seven seasons with the Bills, Saimes started 84 games, with 22 interceptions, three fumble recoveries and nine quarterback sacks. He was an All-Star for five consecutive seasons and first- or second-team All-AFL for five consecutive seasons.

=== Denver Broncos ===
The Denver Broncos signed Saimes a week after the Bills waived him. In Denver, Saimes played for head coach Lou Saban, who had been his coach in Buffalo from 1963 to 1965. Saimes started two games for the Broncos in 1970. In 1971, Saban used Saimes at free safety after Paul Martha retired. Saimes started 13 games at free safety for the Broncos in 1971. In his final professional season (1972), Saimes started four games for the Broncos as a defensive back, appearing in nine games overall. He was placed on the "move list" after being injured in a November 1972 game against the New York Giants.

== Legacy and honors ==
Former professional football writer, president of the Pro Football Writers Association and member of the Greater Buffalo Sports Hall of Fame, Larry Felser, called Saimes "the finest open-field tackler in the league."

Saimes won the Governor of Michigan Award in 1961 and 1962. He achieved All-American Football League honors five times (three first-team), and is a member of the American Football League All-Time Team at safety, as selected by the Pro Football Hall of Fame in 1970. In 1999, Saimes was inducted into the Greater Buffalo Sports Hall of Fame, and in 2000, Saimes was inducted into the Buffalo Bills Wall of Fame. He was selected to the Buffalo Bills Silver Anniversary All-Star Team, and is a member of MSU's all-time defensive team.

== Scouting career ==
Saimes went on to be a professional football scout. In early 1974, he assisted Broncos head coach John Ralston in scouting college players. He was hired by the Blesto V Combine in August 1974. In 1982, he joined the Tampa Bay Buccaneers as a scout, and then was hired by the Washington Redskins in 1984. In 1989, he became Washington's director of college scouting. He later scouted for the Houston Texans.

In 1988, the Green Bay Press-Gazette interviewed 18 NFL general managers and personnel directors to rate the best scouts in the NFL. At the time, Saimes was a national scout for Washington. He was rated the second-best among all NFL scouts. He excelled at film evaluation of players. While still a scout with Blesto, in 1981 he gave the highest marks ever awarded any player to future Hall of Fame quarterback Dan Marino. He insistently stood by his strong recommendation of Marino, even though Marino's senior year was not up to expectations and other scouts were less enthusiastic.

== Personal life and death ==
Saimes lived in North Canton, Ohio after his playing career. He was honored by the city of Canton in 1962, after his final season at Michigan State. In 1977, Saimes was inducted into the national AHEPA (American Hellenic Education Progressive Association) Hall of Fame, a Greek fraternal order, at an event in Canton.

Saimes died in Canton of leukemia on March 8, 2013. He was survived by his wife Betsy, three children and eight grandchildren.

== See also ==
- List of American Football League players
