= Schwendinger =

Schwendinger is a surname. Notable people with the surname include:

- Laura Schwendinger (born 1962), the first composer to win the prestigious American Academy in Berlin
- Peter J. Schwendinger (born 1959), Austrian arachnologist
- Raphael Schwendinger (born 1998), Liechtensteiner judoka

== See also ==
- Schweninger
