= Sandy Stephens =

American football player (1940–2000)

Personal information
- Born: September 21, 1940; Uniontown, Pennsylvania, U.S.
- Died: June 6, 2000 (aged 59); Bloomington, Minnesota, U.S.
- Listed height: 6 ft 0 in (1.83 m)
- Listed weight: 215 lb (98 kg)

Career information
- Positions: Quarterback, fullback (No. 20, 15)
- High school: Uniontown
- College: Minnesota (1959–1961)
- NFL draft: 1962: 2nd round, 25th overall pick
- AFL draft: 1962: 1st round, 5th overall pick

Career history
- Montreal Alouettes (1962–1963); Toronto Argonauts (1963); Kansas City Chiefs (1966–1967)*
- * Offseason or practice squad member only

Awards and highlights
- National champion (1960); Consensus All-American (1961); Big Ten Most Valuable Player (1961); First-team All-Big Ten (1961); Minnesota Golden Gophers jersey No. 15 retired

Career CFL statistics
- Passing completions: 198
- Passing attempts: 408
- Completion percentage: 48.5%
- TD–INT: 22–38
- Passing yards: 2,823
- Passer rating: 50.5
- Rushing yards: 487
- Rushing touchdowns: 8
- College Football Hall of Fame

Sanford Emory Stephens, Jr. (September 21, 1940 – June 6, 2000) was an American football player and civic leader. Stephens was born and raised in the Pittsburgh area city of Uniontown, Pennsylvania and is best known for his career as a college football quarterback for the Minnesota Golden Gophers, where he became one of the first African-American quarterbacks in major college football and the first African American to be named an All-American at quarterback. He was a member of Alpha Phi Alpha fraternity.

== College career ==
Stephens was the first black man to play quarterback at the University of Minnesota and remains the only quarterback to take the Gophers to the Rose Bowl (1961 and 1962). He was one of the first "National Recruits" for the University of Minnesota, along with Judge Dickson and Bill Munsey. Minnesota was one of the few schools at the time willing to field a black quarterback. The mayor of McKeesport, Pennsylvania, had served in the Navy with John Mariucci, the coach of the Gopher Hockey team. Mariucci tipped off the University of Minnesota football coach, Murray Warmath, about the players.

In 1960, along with Uniontown (PA) High School teammate Munsey, Stephens led the University of Minnesota to an 8–1 regular season record and the national championship. Minnesota defeated the Iowa Hawkeyes 27–10, when both teams were undefeated, in one of biggest games in the Iowa–Minnesota football rivalry. Stephens became the first African-American major-college All-American quarterback and finished fourth in the Heisman Trophy balloting. In 1961, Stephens received the Chicago Tribune Silver Football as the Most Valuable Player of the Big Ten Conference.

Sandy Stephens was a member of The Pigskin Club of Washington, D.C. National Intercollegiate All-American Football Players Honor Roll.

== Professional career ==
Stephens was a second-round NFL draft choice of the Cleveland Browns and the fifth overall selection in the AFL draft by the New York Titans in 1962. Both teams said that they wouldn't use him as a quarterback and he never played a down in either league. The Canadian Football League (CFL) welcomed him as a quarterback, as the Montreal Alouettes offered a reported $25,000 signing bonus and a three-year contract at $30,000 per year.

After playing for the Alouettes in 1962, he was cut by Montreal during the 1963 season and was claimed on waivers by the Toronto Argonauts. Upon leaving the CFL, Stephens tried out as a walk-on with the Minnesota Vikings. In his CFL career, he threw 22 touchdowns with 38 interceptions on 2,823 yards, while rushing for 487 yards on 88 carries and 8 touchdowns. He also caught 12 passes for 192 yards and a touchdown. He was also used as an occasional kicker, making 12 out of 19 extra points and 4 out of 8 field goals, with three punts for a 20-yard average. On September 20, 1964, he was involved in a near fatal accident. The car in which he was riding with Ted Dean, a Minnesota Vikings player, struck a tree in South Minneapolis. Two years after the accident Stephens signed with the Kansas City Chiefs as a fullback. He was willing to play any of the back positions and continued to dream of playing as a quarterback in the NFL, but to no avail. He ended his active football career in 1968.

== Death ==
Stephens was found dead at his Bloomington, Minnesota apartment by a relative. His death at age 59 was attributed to a heart attack.

== Legacy ==
Thirty years after he left football, Stephens was named to the University of Minnesota All Century Team, the Star Tribune 100 All-Century Top Sports Figures (No. 30), and awarded NCAA Legends status. He was inducted into the University of Minnesota Sports Hall of Fame, the Western Pennsylvania All Sports Hall of Fame and he was nominated for induction into the National and College Football Foundation Hall of Fame. One of his most coveted recognitions was his induction into the Rose Bowl Hall of Fame in 1997. On May 17, 2011, Stephens was voted into the College Football Hall of Fame as part of the 16-member Class of 2011. He is the 22nd Gopher to be elected into the College Football Hall of Fame and the fourth from the 1960 National Championship team.
