= 1961 Oklahoma Sooners football team =

American college football season

1961 Oklahoma Sooners football
- Conference: Big Eight Conference
- Record: 5–5 (4–3 Big 8)
- Head coach: Bud Wilkinson (15th season)
- Captain: Bill White
- Home stadium: Oklahoma Memorial Stadium

1961 Big Eight Conference football standings
	Conf.					Overall
Team	W		L		T	W		L		T
No. 7 Colorado $	7	–	0	–	0	9	–	2	–	0
No. 11 Missouri	5	–	2	–	0	7	–	2	–	1
Kansas	5	–	2	–	0	7	–	3	–	1
Oklahoma	4	–	3	–	0	5	–	5	–	0
Iowa State	3	–	4	–	0	5	–	5	–	0
Oklahoma State	2	–	5	–	0	4	–	6	–	0
Nebraska	2	–	5	–	0	3	–	6	–	1
Kansas State	0	–	7	–	0	2	–	8	–	0
$ – Conference champion; Rankings from AP Poll

The 1961 Oklahoma Sooners football team was an American football team that represented the University of Oklahoma as a member of the Big Eight Conference (Big 8) during the 1961 college football season. In their 15th year under head coach Bud Wilkinson, the Sooners compiled a 5–5 record (4–3 in conference games), finished in fourth place in the Big 8, and were outscored by a total of 141 to 122. The Sooners lost the first five games of the season before turning things around with five consecutive wins, including a victory over No. 10 Missouri, to finish the season. The 1960 and 1961 seasons were the only non-winning seasons in Wilkinson's 17-year tenure as Oklahoma's head coach.

Tackle Billy White was the team captain and received first-team honors on the 1961 All-Big Eight Conference football team. The team's statistical leaders included halfback Mike McClellan (508 rushing yards), quarterback Bob Page (233 passing yards), and halfback Jimmy Carpenter (12 catches, 143 receiving yards).

The team played its home games at Oklahoma Memorial Stadium in Norman, Oklahoma.

== Schedule ==
Date	Opponent	Site	TV	Result	Attendance	Source
September 30	at Notre Dame*	Notre Dame Stadium; Notre Dame, IN	ABC	L 6–19	54,906	
October 7	Iowa State	Oklahoma Memorial Stadium; Norman, OK		L 15–21	45,365	
October 14	vs. No. 4 Texas*	Cotton Bowl; Dallas, TX (Red River Shootout)		L 7–28	75,504	
October 21	Kansas	Oklahoma Memorial Stadium; Norman, OK		L 0–10	54,794–57,000	
October 28	No. 10 Colorado	Oklahoma Memorial Stadium; Norman, OK		L 14–22	45,117	
November 4	at Kansas State	Memorial Stadium; Manhattan, KS		W 17–6	11,500-11,906	
November 11	at No. 10 Missouri	Memorial Stadium; Columbia, MO (rivalry)		W 7–0	45,146	
November 18	at Army*	Yankee Stadium; Bronx, NY	ABC	W 14–8	37,200-39,552	
November 25	at Nebraska	Memorial Stadium; Lincoln, NE (rivalry)		W 21–14	25,000-26,139	
December 2	Oklahoma State	Oklahoma Memorial Stadium; Norman, OK (Bedlam Series)		W 21–13	52,598	
*Non-conference game; Rankings from AP Poll released prior to the game

== Statistics ==
The 1961 Sooners tallied 2,486 yards of total offense for an average of 248.6 yards per game. Their offense was heavily oriented to the run with 1,960 rushing yards and only 526 passing yards. On defense, the Sooners gave up 2,631 yards to their opponents (263.1 yards per game), consisting of 1,928 rushing yards and 703 passing yards.

The Sooners had five players with 65 or more rushing attempts on the season. The group was led by senior right halfback Mike McClellan with 508 yards on 82 attempts for an average of 6.2 yards per carry. Fullback Phil Lohmann ranked second with 436 yards on 98 attempts for an average of 4.45 yards per carry. Left halfback Jimmy Carpenter was next with 342 rushing yards on 105 carries for a 3.26-yard average.

Senior quarterback Bobby Page completed 17 of 40 passes (42.5%) for 233 yards with two touchdowns and six interceptions. Sophomore Bill Van Burkleo ranked second in passing, completing 16 of 43 (37.2%) for 168 yars with no touchdowns and one interception.

The team's leading receivers were senior halfbacks Jimmy Carpenter with 12 receptions for 143 yards and Mike McClellan with 10 catchers for 125 yards.

== Awards and honors ==
Tackle Billy White was the team captain. He also received first-team honors from both the Associated Press (AP) and United Press International (UPI) on the 1961 All-Big Eight Conference football team. Three others received second-team honors: halfback Jimmy Carpenter (AP-1); halfback Mike McClellan (AP-2); and end Ronny Payne (UPI-2).

== Personnel ==
=== Players ===
- Richard Beattie, fullback, sophomore, 5'11", 191 pounds, Tulsa, OK
- John Benien, end, sophomore, 6'0", 193 pounds, Tulsa, OK
- Virgil Boll, halfback, sophomore, 5'11", 177 pounds, Wichita, KS
- Jimmy Carpenter, halfback, senior, 5'8", 174 pounds, Abilene, TX
- Jim Cook, tackle, junior, 6'1", 209 pounds, Amarillo, TX
- Jackie Cowan, halfback, sophomore, 5'11", 166 pounds, Oklahoma City
- Tom Cox, tackle, senior, 6'2", 213 pounds, Amarillo, TX
- Leon Cross, guard/tackle, junior, 6'0", 200 pounds, Hobbs, NM
- Monte Deere, quarterback, junior, 5'10", 170 pounds, Amarillo, TX
- Claude Hamon, guard, junior, 6'4", 212 pounds, Oklahoma City
- Richard Inman, end, sophomore, 6'1", 215 pounds, Belton, TX
- George Jarman, guard, sophomore, 5'7", 189 pounds, Tulsa, OK
- Paul Lea, halfback, junior, 5'10", 172 pounds, Terrell, TX
- Wayne Lee, center, junior, 6'3", 197 pounds, Ada, OK
- Phil Lohmann, fullback, senior, 6'1", 204 pounds, Pauls Valley, OK
- Mike McClellan, halfback, senior, 6'0", 185 pounds, Stamford, TX
- Jim McCoy, end, senior, 6'1", 189 pounds, Okmulgee, OK
- Karl Milstead, guard, senior, 6'0", 207 pounds, Athens, TX
- Bobby Page, quarterback, senior, 6'1", 184 pounds, Borger, TX
- James Parker, fullback, junior, 5'11", 189 pounds, Sweetwater, TX
- Jimmy Payne, guard/tackle, junior, 5'11", 190 pounds, Stamford, TX
- John Porterfield, end, junior, 6'0", 195 pounds, Bixby, OK
- Ronny Payne, end, senior, 5'11", 190 pounds, Stamford, CT
- George Stokes, tackle, sophomore, 6'5", 211 pounds, Madill, OK
- John Tatum, center, junior, 5'8", 188 pounds, Heavener, OK
- Geary Taylor, halfback, sophomore, 5'10", 180 pounds, Amarillo, TX
- Paul Van Burkleo, quarterback, sophomore, 5'11", 184 pounds, Tulsa, OK
- Dennis Ward, tackle, senior, 6'3", 211 pounds, Bartlesville, OK
- Billy White, tackle and captain, senior, 6'0", 202 pounds, Amarillo, TX
- Gary Wylie, halfback, junior, 6'4", 195 pounds, Whitesboro, TX

=== Coaches ===
- Head coach: Bud Wilkinson
- Assistant coaches: Rudy Feldman, John Floyd, Bob Ward
