= 1961 Kansas State Wildcats football team =

American college football season

1961 Kansas State Wildcats football
- Conference: Big Eight Conference
- Record: 2–8 (0–7 Big 8)
- Head coach: Doug Weaver (2nd season)
- Home stadium: Memorial Stadium

1961 Big Eight Conference football standings
	Conf.					Overall
Team	W		L		T	W		L		T
No. 7 Colorado $	7	–	0	–	0	9	–	2	–	0
No. 11 Missouri	5	–	2	–	0	7	–	2	–	1
Kansas	5	–	2	–	0	7	–	3	–	1
Oklahoma	4	–	3	–	0	5	–	5	–	0
Iowa State	3	–	4	–	0	5	–	5	–	0
Oklahoma State	2	–	5	–	0	4	–	6	–	0
Nebraska	2	–	5	–	0	3	–	6	–	1
Kansas State	0	–	7	–	0	2	–	8	–	0
$ – Conference champion; Rankings from AP Poll

The 1961 Kansas State Wildcats football team was an American football team that represented Kansas State University as a member of the Big Eight Conference (Big 8) during the 1961 college football season. In their second year under head coach Doug Weaver, the Wildcats compiled a 2–8 record (0–7 in conference games), finished in eighth place in the Big 8, and were outscored by a total of 232 to 58.

The team's statistical leaders included quarterback Larry Corrigan (234 passing yards), Joel Searles (252 rushing yards), and Spencer Puls (123 receiving yards).

The team played its home games at Memorial Stadium in Manhattan, Kansas.

== Schedule ==
Date	Opponent	Site	Result	Attendance	Source
September 23	Indiana*	Memorial Stadium; Manhattan, KS	W 14–8	7,800	
September 30	at Air Force*	DU Stadium; Denver, CO	W 14–12	18,666	
October 7	Nebraska	Memorial Stadium; Manhattan, KS (rivalry)	L 0–24	17,515	
October 14	at Kentucky*	McLean Stadium; Lexington, KY	L 8–21	23,000	
October 21	No. 9 Colorado^{†}	Memorial Stadium; Manhattan, KS (rivalry)	L 0–13	12,500	
October 28	at Iowa State	Clyde Williams Field; Ames, IA (rivalry)	L 7–31	18,475–20,000	
November 4	Oklahoma	Memorial Stadium; Manhattan, KS	L 6–17	11,500-11,906	
November 11	at Kansas	Memorial Stadium; Lawrence, KS (rivalry)	L 0–34	34,000	
November 18	at Missouri	Memorial Stadium; Columbia, MO	L 9–27	29,000	
November 25	at Oklahoma State	Lewis Field; Stillwater, OK	L 0–45	7,500	
*Non-conference game; ^{†}Homecoming; Rankings from AP Poll released prior to the game
