= UPI Lineman of the Year =

- Awarded for: most outstanding college football lineman
- Country: United States
- Presented by: United Press International

History
- First award: 1950
- Final award: 1996

The United Press International Lineman of the Year award was given annually by United Press International (UPI) to the lineman of the year in college football. With the demise of UPI in 1997, the award was discontinued. Offensive and defensive linemen were eligible, including offensive ends, with one, Howard Twilley, winning in 1965. Like all UPI college awards at the time, it was based on the votes of NCAA coaches. Ross Browner of Notre Dame was the only two-time winner.

== Winners ==
| Season | Player | Position | School | Ref. |
|---|---|---|---|---|
| 1950 | Les Richter | Guard | California | |
| 1951 | Bill McColl | End | Stanford | |
| 1952 | Tom Catlin | Center | Oklahoma | |
| 1953 | J. D. Roberts | Guard | Oklahoma | |
| 1954 | Jack Ellena | Tackle | UCLA | |
| 1955 | Bob Pellegrini | Center | Maryland | |
| 1956 | Jerry Tubbs | Center | Oklahoma | |
| 1957 | Alex Karras | Tackle | Iowa | |
| 1958 | Bob Harrison | Center | Oklahoma | |
| 1959 | Roger Davis | Guard | Syracuse | |
| 1960 | Tom Brown | Guard | Minnesota | |
| 1961 | Joe Romig | Guard | Colorado | |
| 1962 | Bobby Bell | Tackle | Minnesota | |
| 1963 | Scott Appleton | Tackle | Texas | |
| 1964 | Dick Butkus | Center | Illinois | |
| 1965 | Howard Twilley | End | Tulsa | |
| 1966 | Bubba Smith | Defensive end | Michigan State | |
| 1967 | Granville Liggins | Middle guard | Oklahoma | |
| 1968 | Ted Hendricks | Defensive end | Miami (FL) | |
| 1969 | Mike McCoy | Defensive tackle | Notre Dame | |
| 1970 | Jim Stillwagon | Middle guard | Ohio State | |
| 1971 | Walt Patulski | Defensive end | Notre Dame | |
| 1972 | Rich Glover | Middle guard | Nebraska | |
| 1973 | John Hicks | Offensive tackle | Ohio State | |
| 1974 | Randy White | Defensive tackle | Maryland | |
| 1975 | Lee Roy Selmon | Defensive tackle | Oklahoma | |
| 1976 | Ross Browner | Defensive end | Notre Dame | |
| 1977 | Ross Browner (2) | Defensive end | Notre Dame | |
| 1978 | Greg Roberts | Guard | Oklahoma | |
| 1979 | Brad Budde | Guard | USC | |
| 1980 | Hugh Green | Defensive end | Pittsburgh | |
| 1981 | Kenneth Sims | Defensive tackle | Texas | |
| 1982 | Dave Rimington | Center | Nebraska | |
| 1983 | Dean Steinkuhler | Guard | Nebraska | |
| 1984 | Bill Fralic | Offensive tackle | Pittsburgh | |
| 1985 | Tony Casillas | Defensive tackle | Oklahoma | |
| 1986 | Jerome Brown | Defensive tackle | Miami (FL) | |
| 1987 | Chad Hennings | Defensive tackle | Air Force | |
| 1988 | Tony Mandarich | Offensive tackle | Michigan State | |
| 1989 | Chris Zorich | Defensive tackle | Notre Dame | |
| 1990 | Russell Maryland | Defensive tackle | Miami (FL) | |
| 1991 | Steve Emtman | Defensive tackle | Washington | |
| 1992 | Eric Curry | Defensive end | Alabama | |
| 1993 | Rob Waldrop | Defensive tackle | Arizona | |
| 1994 | Zach Wiegert | Offensive tackle | Nebraska | |
| 1995 | Jonathan Ogden | Offensive tackle | UCLA | |
| 1996 | Orlando Pace | Offensive tackle | Ohio State | |
