= Marv Woodson =

American football player (born 1941)

No. 47
- Positions: Safety, Halfback

Personal information
- Born: September 19, 1941; Hattiesburg, Mississippi, U.S.
- Died: February 11, 2023 (aged 81)
- Listed height: 6 ft 1 in (1.85 m)
- Listed weight: 190 lb (86 kg)

Career information
- High school: Rowan (Hattiesburg)
- College: Indiana
- NFL draft: 1964: 1st round, 8th overall pick
- AFL draft: 1964: 3rd round, 17th overall pick

Career history
- Pittsburgh Steelers (1964–1969); New Orleans Saints (1969); Washington Redskins (1970)*
- * Offseason or practice squad member only

Awards and highlights
- Pro Bowl (1966); 2× Second-team All-Big Ten (1961, 1962)

Career NFL statistics
- Interceptions: 18
- Fumble recoveries: 4
- Total touchdowns: 2
- Stats at Pro Football Reference

Marvin Lewis Woodson (September 19, 1941 – February 11, 2023) was an American professional football player who was a safety and defensive back in the National Football League (NFL). He played college football for the Indiana Hoosiers.

== Early life and college ==
Woodson was born on September 19, 1941, in Hattiesburg, Mississippi. Woodson attended Rowan High School in Hattiesburg. He attended Indiana University, where he played college football.

At Indiana, he played offense as well as defense, rushing for 540 yards and five touchdowns in 1962, along with 200 receiving yards, leading the team in both rushing and receiving. In addition, he returned punts and kickoffs and had two interceptions. Woodson's 92-yard interception touchdown return in a November 1962 game against Purdue is considered one of the great plays in Indiana football history. He was selected first-team All-American. He only played three games his senior year because of a serious knee injury.

Future NFL player Nate Ramsay played in Indiana's offensive and defensive backfields with Woodson at Indiana. He was also teammates with future NFL players Tom Nowatzke (Woodson's backup in 1962) and Rudy Kuechenberg.

== Professional football ==
Woodson was drafted by the Baltimore Colts in the first round of the 1964 NFL draft (eighth overall), and was selected in the third round of the 1964 AFL draft by the Denver Broncos (17th overall pick). The Colts traded Bill Saul and Woodson to the Pittsburgh Steelers for kicker/defensive lineman Lou Michaels and a 1965 third-round pick (that became Glenn Ressler) before ever playing for Baltimore.

He played 72 games across six NFL seasons, playing for the Steelers from 1964 to 1969 and for the New Orleans Saints in 1969. He was waived by the Steelers in 1969, after eight games, and was picked up by the Saints.

He played in the defensive backfield at cornerback and strong safety. He also returned punts and kickoffs. He wore No. 47 for both the Steelers and Saints, and was the last player to wear 47 in Pittsburgh before the team drafted Mel Blount. Despite having a connection with two prominent Steelers cornerbacks now in the Pro Football Hall of Fame (Blount and Rod Woodson), the connection is coincidental as the two Woodsons weren't related.

Woodson had 18 interceptions as a Steeler, returning two for touchdowns, including a career-high seven in 1967. His success in intercepting passes came from his speed and his study of his opponents' tendencies. He was selected to the Pro Bowl in 1967.

He was outspoken on providing equal opportunities for African Americans in football.

== After football ==
Woodson ran a landscaping business after retiring from football.

== Death ==
Woodson died on February 11, 2023.
