= Don Brumm =

American football player (born 1941)

- Brumm in 1972

No. 86, 80
- Position: Defensive end

Personal information
- Born: October 4, 1941 (age 85); Chicago Heights, Illinois, U.S.
- Listed height: 6 ft 3 in (1.91 m)
- Listed weight: 245 lb (111 kg)

Career information
- High school: Hammond (Hammond, Indiana)
- College: Purdue
- NFL draft: 1963: 1st round, 13th overall pick
- AFL draft: 1963: 3rd round, 24th overall pick

Career history
- St. Louis Cardinals (1963–1969); Philadelphia Eagles (1970–1971); St. Louis Cardinals (1972)

Awards and highlights
- Pro Bowl (1968); First-team All-American (1962); First-team All-Big Ten (1962); Second-team All-Big Ten (1961)

Career NFL statistics
- Fumble recoveries: 9
- Touchdowns: 2
- Sacks: 41
- Stats at Pro Football Reference

Donald Dwain Brumm (born October 4, 1941) is an American former professional football player who was a defensive lineman in the National Football League (NFL) for the St. Louis Cardinals and the Philadelphia Eagles. He went to one Pro Bowl during his ten-year career. Brumm played college football for the Purdue Boilermakers and was selected in the first round of the 1963 NFL draft with the 13th overall pick. He was also selected in the third round of the 1963 AFL draft by the Kansas City Chiefs.

== Early life ==
Brumm was born on October 4, 1941, in Chicago Heights, Illinois. He attended Hammond High School, in Hammond, Indiana, graduating in 1959. He was all-conference and all-state on the football team, and also was on the basketball and track teams. He is a member of the Hammond Sports Hall of Fame.

== College football ==
Brumm then became a standout lineman for Purdue, starting two years at defensive end. A first-team All-American selection by both Associated Press (AP) and United Press International (UPI), he played in the Hula Bowl and East West Shrine Game as well as in a 1963 College All-Star Game victory over the Green Bay Packers prior to his pro football rookie season. He was also selected by the Football Writers Association to the 1962 Look magazine All-America team.

== Professional football ==
Brumm was drafted by the St. Louis Cardinals of the National Football League (NFL) in the 1963 NFL draft, with St. Louis making him their first round selection, using the 13th pick in the draft overall. He was selected in the third round of the 1963 AFL draft by the Kansas City Chiefs, 24th overall, but chose to play in the NFL.

As a rookie, Brumm won the starting job at right defensive end, after Luke Owens was moved to tackle. Brumm started 11 games, but missed three because of knee problems that originated with an injury in the College All Star game before the season started. Brumm was coachable and improved markedly during his rookie year in pass rushing; and was well-liked by his teammates. He was selected by the writers and broadcasters covering the Cardinals as the team's rookie of the year.

Brumm played for the Cardinals from 1963-69, starting at left, then right, defensive end, starting 71 games over that time. From 1963-68 he had 33 quarterback sacks. In a 1966 article, Sports Illustrated called Brumm one of the NFL's best pass rushers. In 1968, he had a career high nine sacks, and was selected to the 1968 Pro Bowl. He missed the beginning of the 1969 season when he suffered a pre-season knee injury.

Brumm played two years for the Philadelphia Eagles (1970-71), where he played in 16 games and started only one game. He returned to the Cardinals for his final NFL season in 1972 after the Eagles waived him, where he started 12 of 14 games and had 5.5 sacks. Brumm retired from the NFL after the 1972 season. He played a year in the World Football League (1975), but suffered a severe back injury and did not play professional football again.

Over his career, Brumm had seven recovered fumbles, and twice scored NFL touchdowns with recovered fumbles. On October 10, 1965, he ran 10 yards with a fumble for a score in a 37–16 Cardinals victory over the Washington Redskins. He ran 17 yards for a touchdown on September 22, 1968, in a St. Louis loss to the San Francisco 49ers.

His nickname in football was "Boomer".

== Honors ==
He was a 2011 inductee of the Indiana Football Hall of Fame. He is a member of the Cardinals' Honor Roll.
