= 1961 All-Big Ten Conference football team =

American college football all-star team

The 1961 All-Big Ten Conference football team consists of American football players chosen by various organizations for All-Big Ten Conference teams for the 1961 Big Ten Conference football season.

== All-Big Ten selections ==
=== Quarterbacks ===
- Sandy Stephens, Minnesota (AP-1; UPI-1)
- Ron Miller, Wisconsin (AP-2)

=== Halfbacks ===
- Bennie McRae, Michigan (AP-1; UPI-1)
- George Saimes, Michigan State (AP-1; UPI-1)
- Sherman Lewis, Michigan State (AP-2)
- Dave Raimey, Michigan (AP-2; UPI-2)
- Bill Munsey, Minnesota (UPI-2)

=== Fullbacks ===
- Bob Ferguson, Ohio State (AP-1; UPI-1)
- Marv Woodson, Indiana (AP-2)
- Bill Tunicliff, Michigan (UPI-2)

=== Ends ===
- Pat Richter, Wisconsin (AP-1; UPI-1)
- Jack Elwell, Purdue (AP-1)
- Tom Hall, Minnesota (AP-2; UPI-1)
- Tom Perdue, Ohio State (AP-2)

=== Tackles ===
- Bobby Bell, Minnesota (AP-1; UPI-1)
- Dave Behrman, Michigan State (AP-1)
- Fate Echols, Northwestern (AP-2; UPI-1)
- Don Brumm, Purdue (AP-2)
- Bob Vogel, Ohio State (UPI-2)

=== Guards ===
- Mike Ingram, Ohio State (AP-1; UPI-1)
- Stan Sczurek, Purdue (AP-1; UPI-2)
- Tony Parrilli, Illinois (AP-2; UPI-1)
- Sherwyn Thorson, Iowa (AP-2)

=== Centers ===
- Larry Onesti, Northwestern (AP-1; UPI-1)
- Bill Van Buren, Iowa (AP-2)

== Key ==
AP = Associated Press

UPI = United Press International

Bold = Consensus first-team selection of both the AP and UPI

== See also ==
- 1961 College Football All-America Team
