= Schweninger =

Schweninger is a surname. Notable people with the surname include:

- Dietmar Schweninger, Austrian para-alpine skier
- Ernst Schweninger (1850–1924), German physician and naturopath
- Loren Schweninger (born 1942), history professor and author
- Rosa Schweninger (1849–1918), Austrian painter
