= Romik =

Romik is both a surname and a given name. Notable people with the name include:

- Stanisław Romik (1926–2016), Polish sports shooter
- Romik Khachatryan (b. 1978), Armenian footballer

== See also ==
- Romig
