= Billy Neighbors =

American football player (1940–2012)

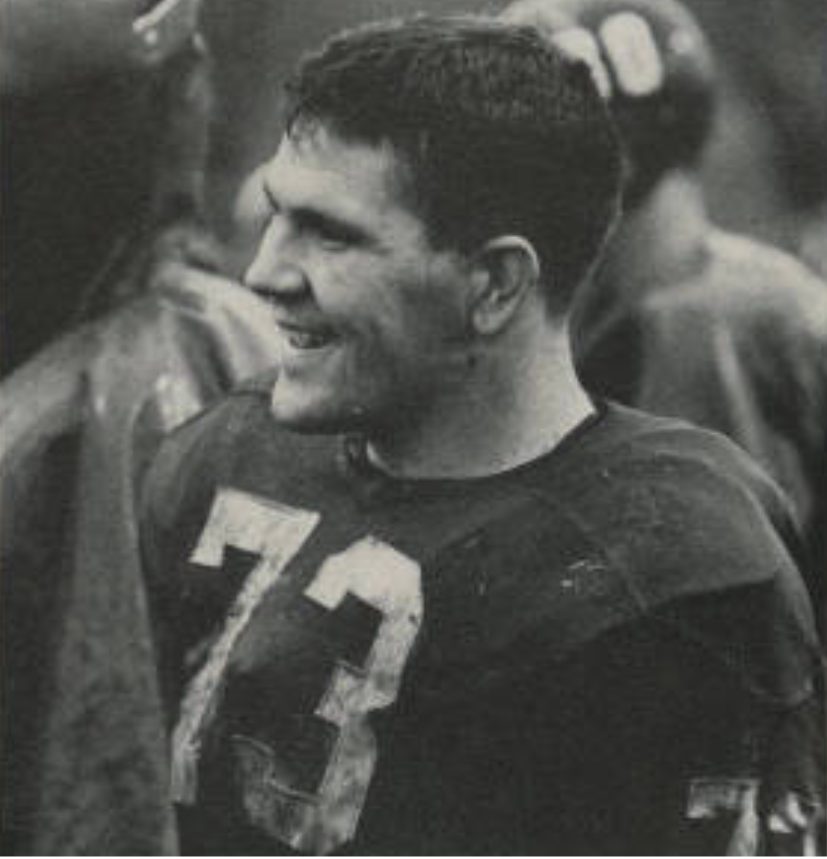
- Neighbors in 1961

No. 73, 63
- Position: Guard

Personal information
- Born: February 4, 1940; Tuscaloosa, Alabama, U.S.
- Died: April 30, 2012 (aged 72); Huntsville, Alabama, U.S.
- Listed height: 6 ft 0 in (1.83 m)
- Listed weight: 250 lb (113 kg)

Career information
- High school: Northport (AL) Tuscaloosa Co.
- College: Alabama
- NFL draft: 1962: 4th round, 43rd overall pick
- AFL draft: 1962: 6th round, 46th overall pick

Career history
- Boston Patriots (1962-1965); Miami Dolphins (1966-1969)

Awards and highlights
- AFL All-Star (1963); Boston Patriots All-1960s Team; National champion (1961); Unanimous All-American (1961); Jacobs Blocking Trophy (1961); First-team All-SEC (1961); Second-team All-SEC (1960)

Career AFL statistics
- Games played: 112
- Games started: 99
- Stats at Pro Football Reference
- College Football Hall of Fame

William Wesley Neighbors (February 4, 1940 – April 30, 2012) was an American professional football guard who played in the American Football League (AFL) from 1962 to 1969. Born in Tuscaloosa, Alabama, he played college football at the University of Alabama where he was a consensus All-American in 1961 and was selected in sixth round of the 1962 AFL draft. Neighbors was also drafted in the fourth round of the 1962 NFL draft by the Washington Redskins. Neighbors was selected to the Boston Patriots All-1960s (AFL) Team and was inducted to the College Football Hall of Fame in 2003.

His son, Wes Neighbors, was an All-Southeastern Conference center at Alabama from 1984 to 1986. His grandson Wes, is a former player at Alabama and current assistant coach. Neighbors died of a heart attack in 2012.
