= Jim Dillard (gridiron football) =

American football player (1938–2022)

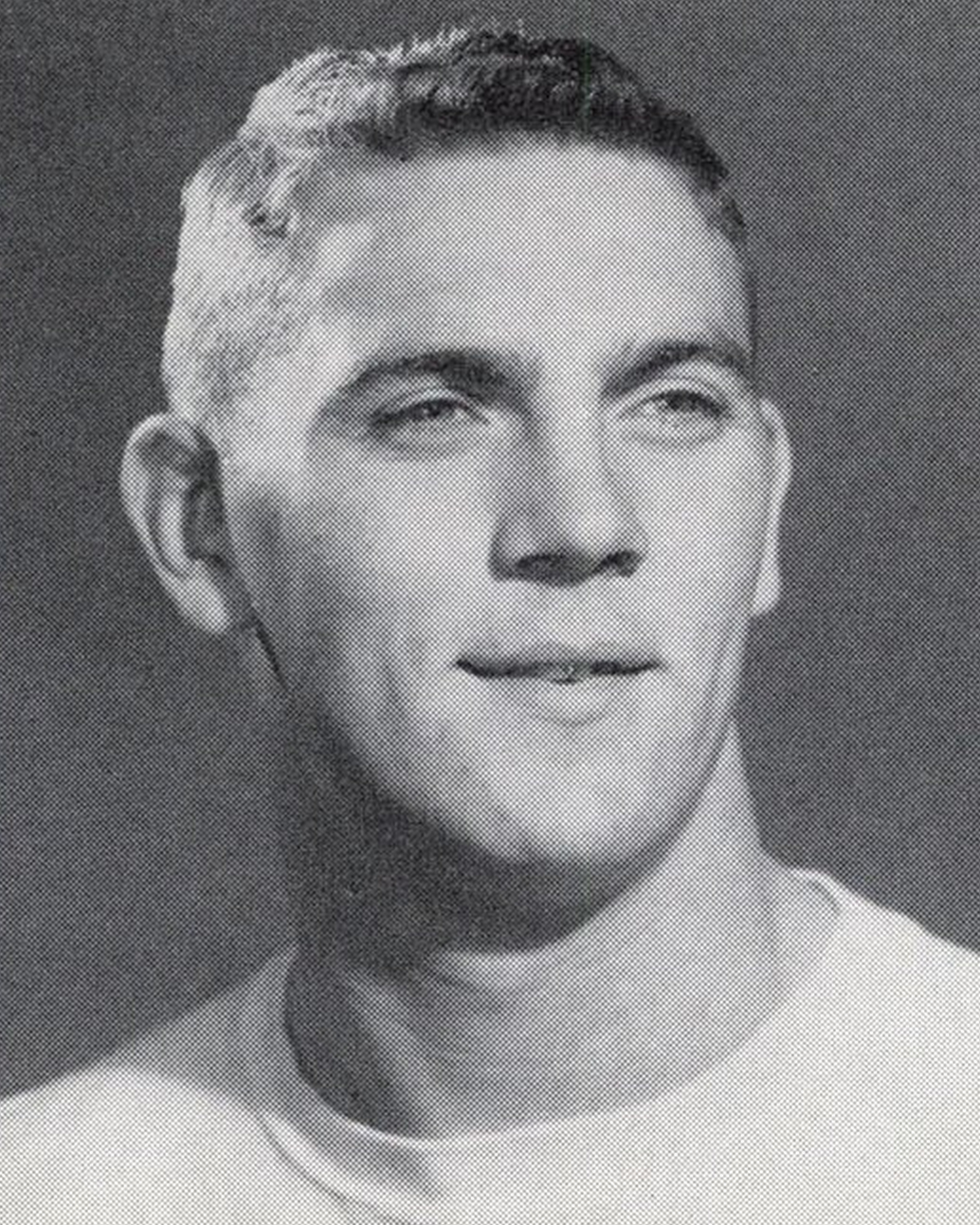
- Dillard at Oklahoma State, c. 1961

No. 20, 23, 11
- Position: Halfback

Personal information
- Born: December 21, 1938; Pawhuska, Oklahoma, U.S.
- Died: July 19, 2022 (aged 83); Cleveland, Oklahoma, U.S.
- Listed height: 6 ft 2 in (1.88 m)
- Listed weight: 210 lb (95 kg)

Career information
- High school: Fairfax (Fairfax, Oklahoma)
- College: Oklahoma State
- NFL draft: 1962: 4th round, 51st overall pick
- AFL draft: 1962: 9th round, 65th overall pick

Career history
- 1962–1964: Calgary Stampeders
- 1965–1966: Ottawa Rough Riders
- 1967–1968: Toronto Argonauts
- 1969: Baltimore Colts*
- 1969: Minnesota Vikings*
- * Offseason or practice squad member only

Awards and highlights
- 2× CFL East All-Star (1965, 1967); CFL West All-Star (1963); Second-team All-Big Eight (1961)

James Austin Dillard (December 21, 1938 – July 19, 2022) was an American professional football halfback who played for the Calgary Stampeders, Ottawa Rough Riders and Toronto Argonauts of the Canadian Football League (CFL). He played college football at Oklahoma State University–Stillwater and also had stints with the Baltimore Colts and Minnesota Vikings in the National Football League (NFL). He was a second-team All-Big Eight Conference selection at Oklahoma State and later was a three-time all-star in the CFL.

== Early life and college ==
James Austin Dillard was born on December 21, 1938, in Pawhuska, Oklahoma, to Austin and Eunice Dillard. He attended Fairfax High School in Fairfax, Oklahoma, where he participated in football and track and was given the nickname "Fairfax Freighter". In football, he was named team most valuable player, most outstanding back in the conference, All-American, and all-state. He competed at the Oil Bowl high school all-star game.

Dillard was given a full scholarship to Oklahoma State University–Stillwater after graduating from high school. He accepted the offer and played football on the freshman team in 1958. In a 1958 game against the Oklahoma freshmen, Dillard scored a touchdown on a 97-yard run. He played his first season on the varsity team in 1959. On offense he played as a backup to senior Vernon Sewell, and on defense he excelled at defensive back. By week four of the season, Dillard had 220 rushing yards and a 6.7 average per-carry, placing him second on the team behind Sewell (who had 222).

Dillard's coach Cliff Speegle said:

Jim can become a tremendous football player if he continues to improve in the little things. He has improved his defensive play every week and his natural "football sense" made him a fair defensive player to begin with. Offensively, of course, he has a ton of things going for him. First of all is his speed. Couple that with his size and his native strength. Those are the basic attributes. Then come the things which can be improved in a player. For instance Dillard has fine balance but this is something that can be improved still more in a player who is willing to work. Jim's attitude toward work has been the greatest, work on the things in which he is short ... Dillard is, obviously, a great runner both on the short-yardage plunge and in the broken field. He demonstrated both so well in the Tulsa game. He blocks with authority, tackles the same way, and he is a good pass receiver. All these items incidentally are things that can continue to improve. The Fairfax boy certainly is a tremendous prospect for greatness because he can be what is called a 'whole' football player: offense, defense, all of it. We think he has what it takes.

Dillard ended the 1959 season as the team's leading rusher. In a game against Tulsa that year, he scored on a 91-yard touchdown run, which remains the fourth-longest run in school history. He became the starting running back in 1960 and led the team again in rushing yards with 647 on 154 attempts, placing eighth in the conference. He was named one of the three team captains for his senior season, 1961.

Described as one of Oklahoma State's "all-time great" runners, Dillard is one of only eight players to have led the team in rushing three consecutive seasons and was named to their 1950s all-decade team. He finished with 1,840 rushing yards on 392 attempts, a 4.69 average per-carry.

== Professional career ==
Dillard was selected both in the 1962 NFL draft (by the Baltimore Colts, 51st overall) and 1962 AFL draft (by the Oakland Raiders, 65th overall), but declined both offers to play in the CFL for the Calgary Stampeders. "They paid more money than American teams then", Dillard later said. "A lot of Americans went up there. They also got you a job." In his first preseason game with the team, Dillard scored three touchdowns and helped Calgary win 30–28 over the Montreal Alouettes. He made his CFL debut in week one, a 6–17 loss to the Saskatchewan Roughriders. He came to the team "highly recommended and proved why" in week two against the Winnipeg Blue Bombers, according to the Times Colonist, rushing for 114 yards and scoring two touchdowns. He played in all 16 games in his first season of professional football, and finished with 92 rush attempts for 480 yards and 38 receptions for 733 yards, scoring a total of nine touchdowns.

In 1963, Dillard shared the starting running back position with Lovell Coleman and appeared in 15 games, making 108 rushing attempts for 690 yards, and 34 receptions for 543 yards, scoring 13 touchdowns. He placed second in touchdowns scored, only behind Coleman, and helped the team compile a 10–4–2 record. He was named a 1963 CFL west all-star.

The following season, Dillard only saw action in five games, making 30 rushes for 179 yards and 16 receptions for 224 yards, scoring three touchdowns as the Stampeders finished with a record of 12–4. In 1965, just before the regular season began, Dillard was traded to the Ottawa Rough Riders for two players. He was named an east all-star selection in his first season with Ottawa, after recording 130 rushes for 756 yards in just 12 games. He appeared in 14 games the following season and ran for 627 yards, scoring seven touchdowns. He helped the team make it to the Grey Cup that year, where they lost to the Saskatchewan Roughriders 14–29.

Dillard was traded to the Toronto Argonauts in 1967. He was their top running back and led the team with 670 rushing yards on 124 carries. He also scored a team-leading nine touchdowns on his way to a second east all-star selection. He finished his CFL career after rushing for 547 yards with Toronto in 1968.

In 1969, Dillard signed with the Baltimore Colts in the NFL, who had drafted him seven years prior. He was traded to the Minnesota Vikings in July, but did not make their final roster.

Dillard finished his CFL career with 733 rushes for 3,949 yards and 28 touchdowns. He also caught 164 passes for 2,496 yards and 19 touchdowns, while appearing in a total of 88 games.

== Later life ==
In 1971, Dillard moved to Tulsa, Oklahoma, where he became a teacher and coach in football, swimming, and track. He also served as an assistant coach for the Tulsa Knights professional football team in the Mid-American League. from 1974 to 1975. He moved to Cleveland, Oklahoma, in December 1975, and became an insurance agent at State Farm. He retired in 2017.

In 2005, Dillard was inducted into the Oil Bowl Hall of Fame.

His son J. R. Dillard played for Oklahoma State and in the CFL, and his grandson Clint Dillard also played at Oklahoma State.

Dillard died on July 19, 2022, at his home in Cleveland, at age 83.
