= Ed Blaine =

American football player and researcher (1940–2026)

No. 60, 64
- Position: Guard

Personal information
- Born: January 30, 1940; Farmington, Missouri, U.S.
- Died: March 22, 2026 (aged 86); St. Louis, Missouri, U.S.
- Listed height: 6 ft 1 in (1.85 m)
- Listed weight: 240 lb (109 kg)

Career information
- High school: Farmington
- College: Missouri
- NFL draft: 1962: 2nd round, 28th overall pick
- AFL draft: 1962: 4th round, 29th overall pick

Career history
- Green Bay Packers (1962); Philadelphia Eagles (1963–1966)

Awards and highlights
- NFL champion (1962); First-team All-American (1961); First-team All-Big Eight (1961); Second-team All-Big Eight (1960)

Career NFL statistics
- Games played: 70
- Games started: 55
- Fumble recoveries: 5
- Stats at Pro Football Reference

Edward Homer Blaine (January 30, 1940 – March 22, 2026) was an American professional football player who was a guard in the National Football League (NFL). He played college football for the Missouri Tigers, earning first-team All-American honors in 1961. After his football career, he became a professor of medical pharmacology and physiology and a cardiovascular researcher at the University of Missouri.

== Early life ==
Blaine was born in Farmington, Missouri, on January 30, 1940. He attended the University of Missouri, where he played offensive guard for the Tigers while a pre-med student there. Blaine was named All-Big Eight Conference and All-American in 1961.

== Professional football career ==
Blaine was selected by the Green Bay Packers in the second round (28th overall) of the 1962 NFL draft, and was also selected by the New York Titans in the fourth round (29th overall) of the American Football League (AFL)'s 1962 draft.

He played professionally in the NFL with the Packers in 1962, winning an NFL Championship under legendary coach Vince Lombardi as a rookie, and the Philadelphia Eagles from 1963-66. He was named All-Pro after the 1964 NFL season. Blaine was inducted into the University of Missouri Hall of Fame in 1991 and the Missouri Sports Hall of Fame in 2011.

== Medical science career ==
Blaine earned a doctorate in physiology from the University of Missouri in 1970. Over a period of 45 years, from 1970 until his retirement in 2015, he conducted pioneering research on the effect of kidney function on cardiovascular disease, and on how hormonal systems regulate blood pressure. Between the 1970s and the early 1990s, he was a senior director of research for the Merck Institute for Therapeutic Research in West Point, Montgomery County, Missouri, and at G. D. Searle & Co. pharmaceuticals in Missouri. During the same period, he taught at Temple University and at Washington University in St. Louis, and conducted research on the effects of salt on kangaroos at the University of Melbourne. From 1992 until his retirement, he was director of the Dalton Cardiovascular Research Center at the University of Missouri, where he was a professor of medical pharmacology and physiology.

== Later years and death ==
In 2008, Blaine was recognized as a Distinguished Eagle Scout. This award is given by the National Eagle Scout Association "to recognize Eagle Scouts who achieve extraordinary national-level recognition, fame, or eminence within their profession and/or service to the nation and have a strong record of voluntary service to their community".

Blaine died in St. Louis on March 22, 2026, at the age of 86.
