= Dave Behrman =

American football player (1941–2014)

No. 51, 60, 56
- Positions: Center, tackle

Personal information
- Born: November 9, 1941; Dowagiac, Michigan, U.S.
- Died: December 9, 2014 (aged 73); East Lansing, Michigan, U.S.
- Listed height: 6 ft 5 in (1.96 m)
- Listed weight: 260 lb (118 kg)

Career information
- High school: Dowagiac (MI)
- College: Michigan State
- NFL draft: 1963: 1st round, 11 (by the Chicago Bears)th overall pick
- AFL draft: 1963: 1st round, 4 (by the Buffalo Bills)th overall pick

Career history
- Buffalo Bills (1963–1965); Denver Broncos (1967); Lansing All Stars (1972); Flint Sabres (1973–1974); Lansing Capitals (1975–1976)

Awards and highlights
- AFL champion (1965); AFL All-Star (1965); First-team All-American (1961); Second-team All-American (1962); 2× First-team All-Big Ten (1961, 1962)

Career NFL statistics
- Games played: 39
- Games started: 0
- Fumble recoveries: 1
- Stats at Pro Football Reference

David Wesley Behrman (Pronounced: BEER-man) (November 9, 1941 – December 9, 2014) was an American professional football offensive lineman who played in the American Football League (AFL) for the Buffalo Bills and Denver Broncos. He was the fourth overall pick in the 1963 AFL draft by the Bills and the 11th pick in the 1963 NFL draft by the Chicago Bears. He also played in the Midwest Football League (MFL) for the Lansing All Stars / Capitals and Flint Sabres from 1972 to 1976.

== College career ==
Behrman played college football at Michigan State University.

== Professional career ==
=== Buffalo Bills ===
Behrman was the Bills' first-round draft pick in 1963 and played for them that year, but not in 1964. During the 1965 AFL season, Behrman became the Bills' starting center, replacing veteran Walt Cudzik, playing between left offensive guard Billy Shaw and right guard Al Bemiller. However, due to a back injury, Behrman did not play when the Bills won their second AFL Championship game over the San Diego Chargers by a score of 23–0 under head coach Lou Saban. That season, Behrman was an AFL All-Star center. However, he did not play in 1966, replaced by Bemiller.

=== Denver Broncos ===
Behrman played with the AFL's Denver Broncos during the 1967 AFL season when he played in 11 games.

=== Midwest Football League ===
Behrman signed with the Lansing All Stars of the Midwest Football League in September 1972. He played with the Flint Sabres in 1973 and 1974. He rejoined Lansing, now called the Lansing Capitals, in July 1975. He played with the Capitals through 1976.

== Personal ==
On December 9, 2014, he died of pancreatic cancer. He was one of at least 345 NFL players to be diagnosed after death with chronic traumatic encephalopathy (CTE), caused by repeated hits to the head.

== See also ==
- Other American Football League players
