= John and Edith Kilbuck =

American husband-and-wife Moravian missionary duo, to the Central Alaskan Yup'ik people

John Henry Kilbuck (May 15, 1861 – 1922) — sometimes spelled Killbuck (Lenape)— and his wife, Edith Kilbuck (née Romig; April 16, 1865 – 1933), were Moravian missionaries in southwestern Alaska in the late 19th and early 20th centuries. John H. Kilbuck was the first Lenape to be ordained as a Moravian minister. They served the Yup'ik, used their language in the Moravian Church in their area, and supported development of a writing system for Yup'ik.

John was the great-grandson of the Delaware (Lenape) principal chief Gelelemend, who signed the Treaty of Fort Pitt (1778). It was the first American Indian treaty with the recently declared United States. Born in Kansas, John Henry Killbuck was educated by Moravians in Bethlehem, Pennsylvania, where he went to seminary. Edith was the daughter and granddaughter of Moravian missionaries in Kansas.

== Biography ==
John Kilbuck was born in Franklin County, Kansas on May 15, 1861, into a family of the Christian Munsee band of the Lenape (Delaware). His mother was Mahican, a related Algonquian tribe. Through his father, Kilbuck was the great-grandson of the Lenape principal chief, Gelelemend of the Turtle Clan, the first American Indian to sign a treaty with the United States. Traditionally, the Lenape had a matrilineal kinship system, in which descent and inheritance were figured through the mother's line.

Many Munsee had relocated from Ohio and Indiana to Kansas Indian Territory by 1821, forced out of their former territory in the Midwest by continued settler pressure. The United States pushed to remove all the American Indians from east of the Mississippi River and offered land in the west. Moravian missionaries in Kansas recognized that Killbuck was a bright youth. They encouraged him to go East for studies at the Moravian center of Bethlehem, Pennsylvania to obtain an education, first at the Nazareth Boys’ School and later at the Moravian College and Seminary. In 1884 Killbuck was the first Lenape to be ordained as a Moravian minister.

Edith Romig was born on April 16, 1865, also in Franklin County, Kansas, the daughter of Joseph Romig, a Moravian minister among the Munsee in Ottawa, Kansas, and his wife. Her maternal grandparents were Levi Ricksecker and his wife. Ricksecker was Romig's predecessor as missionary to the Munsee in Kansas. Both Ricksecker and Romig preserved important historical information about the Munsee of that period. Edith Romig was teaching in the mission school and was 19 years old when she met John Kilbuck at his return to Kansas.

== Marriage and family ==
In 1885, John Henry Kilbuck (age 23) and Edith Romig (age 19) married. Two years before, when John was still in the seminary, Sheldon Jackson had invited the Moravian Church to send missionaries to Alaska. It wasn't until 1885 that the Kilbuck newlyweds and John's friend and classmate William Weinland and his new wife set out with Hans Torgersen for Alaska to establish the first Moravian mission station, named Bethel, which has since grown into an important city along the Kuskokwim River . The Kilbucks served as missionaries and educators in Alaska for most of their adult lives. Their four children, all born at the Bethel Mission, carried the traditional Kilbuck middle name of Henry, to honor Major William Henry who had saved the life of their ancestor, Chief Gelelemend, in 1775. John and Edith Kilbuck's four children were Katherine Henry (b. 1886), William Henry (b. 1887), Joseph Henry (b.1889), and Ruth Henry (b.1891). All four children spent their early years with their parents in Alaska, then attended Moravian schools in North Carolina

== Career in Alaska ==
The Kilbucks went to Alaska as part of the first group of missionaries, establishing a mission at what became Bethel. They spent their adult lives in southwestern Alaska as missionaries and teachers among the Yup'ik people. In 1896, they were joined by Edith's younger brother Joseph H. Romig and his wife Ella.

The Kilbucks were perhaps the most influential missionaries during the period around 1900. They quickly learned the Yup'ik language. John developed his missionary work based on existing Yup'ik villages, rather than establishing separate mission stations, as had been done by Moravian missionaries in Greenland and Labrador. He adopted Yup'ik as the language of the Moravian Church in Alaska, a policy which continues to the present in Yup'ik-speaking areas.The diaries of the Kilbucks provide much of what is known of Yup'ik life in the late 1800s. The Kilbuck Mountain Range in southwestern Alaska bears their name.

Reverend John Hinz, another missionary, had begun to translate scripture and other material into Yup'ik written with Roman (English) letters. Uyaquq, a local "helper," convert and later missionary, translated some of these texts into Yup'ik using a script which he had created to write Yugtun. Hinz and the Kilbucks supported both of these efforts. The Hinz script became the standard for writing Yup'ik until about 1970. It was replaced by a script developed by a group of native Yup'ik speakers and linguists at the University of Alaska.

John Henry Kilbuck died in 1922 in Akiak, Alaska. Edith died in 1933.

== Legacy and honors ==
- The Kilbuck Family Scholarship for Native Americans is awarded annually to a Native American college student from Alaska or Oregon.
- The diaries and letters of John and Edith Kilbuck provide much information otherwise unavailable about Yup'ik life in the late 19th century.
- The book, The Real People and the Children of Thunder by Ann Fienup-Riordan, is about their ministry and the Yup'ik.
- The Kilbuck Mountain range and the Kilbuck Elementary School in Bethel, Alaska, were named for them.
