= Bill Thornton (American football) =

American football player (1939–2008)

No. 36
- Position: Fullback

Personal information
- Born: September 20, 1939; Toledo, Ohio, U.S.
- Died: December 18, 2008 (aged 69); Columbia, Missouri, U.S.
- Listed height: 6 ft 1 in (1.85 m)
- Listed weight: 215 lb (98 kg)

Career information
- High school: Libbey (OH)
- College: Nebraska
- NFL draft: 1963: 5th round, 58th overall pick
- AFL draft: 1963: 12th round, 171st overall pick

Career history

Playing
- St. Louis Cardinals (1963–1967)

Coaching
- St. Louis Cardinals (1972) Offensive backs coach

Awards and highlights
- Second-team All-American (1962); First-team All-Big Eight (1961); Second-team All-Big Eight (1962)

Career NFL statistics
- Rushing yards: 544
- Rushing average: 5.8
- Receptions: 13
- Receiving yards: 68
- Total touchdowns: 2
- Stats at Pro Football Reference

William Albert "Thunder" Thornton (September 20, 1939 – December 18, 2008) was an American football fullback who played college football for the Nebraska Cornhuskers and professional football for the St. Louis Cardinals. After his playing career, Thornton coached at Nebraska, Missouri, and the Cardinals.

== Early life ==
A native of Toledo, Ohio, he attended Libbey High School in Toledo, graduating in 1959. Thornton participated in football, basketball, and track at Libbey. Thornton was recruited by numerous colleges, choosing Nebraska over offers from Ohio State and other Big Ten and Mid-American conference schools.

== Playing career ==
=== College ===
Thornton played fullback and linebacker at Nebraska from 1960 to 1962. After his junior season in 1961, the Associated Press named Thornton a first-team Big Eight fullback, as well as an honorable-mention All-American.

A pre-season separated shoulder injury shortened Thornton's 1962 senior season. He still served as a co-captain and became an honorable mention All-Big Eight selection. After the season, Thronton played in the East–West Shrine Bowl in San Francisco.

During his senior year Thornton was the first black athlete inducted into the Innocents Society, the University of Nebraska's chancellor's club that honors outstanding seniors for their academic and leadership abilities.

=== NFL ===
Thornton was drafted by the St. Louis Cardinals with the 58th pick (fifth round) in the 1963 NFL draft. He played for the Cardinals from 1963 to 1965 and in 1967, appearing in 47 games.

== Coaching career ==
Thornton was hired as a graduate assistant at Nebraska by head coach Bob Devaney in 1969. The following year, he was promoted and became the first black coach in program history. Thornton coached at Nebraska until early 1972. During his three-year stint, Nebraska won three Big Eight Conference titles and two national championships (1970 and 1971).

In March 1972, Thornton left Nebraska to coach running backs for the NFL's St. Louis Cardinals. He was the first black coach in franchise history, but resigned after just five months with the team.

Thornton served as the running backs coach at Missouri under head coach Warren Powers from 1978 until 1982. Missouri played in four bowl games during Thornton's tenure.

== Later life ==
After retiring from coaching, Thornton worked for 16 years for the State of Missouri. He died in 2008 in Columbia, Missouri, of complications from diabetes.
