= Frank Parker (American football) =

American football player (1939–2025)

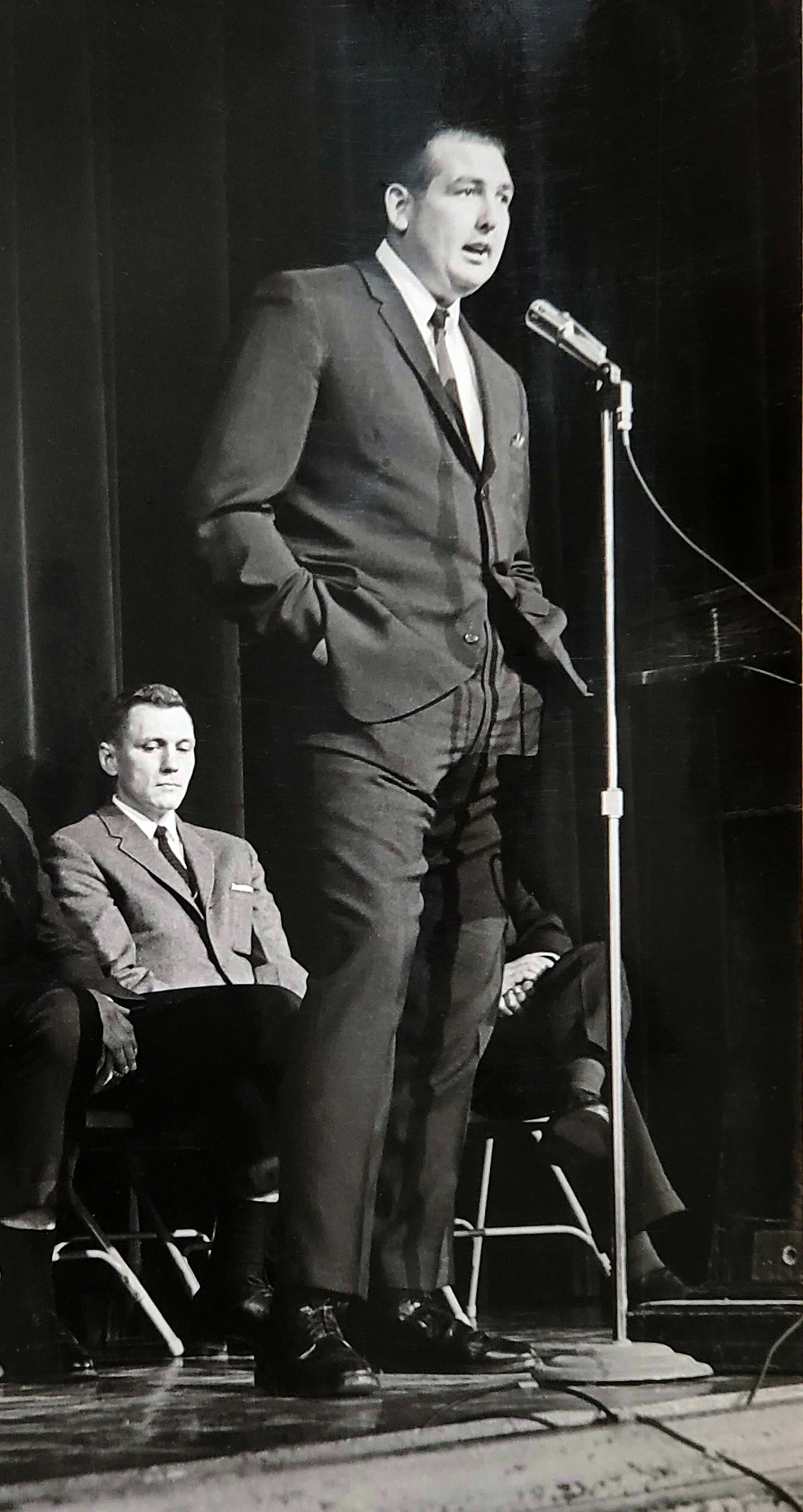
Frank Parker Billy Frank Parker
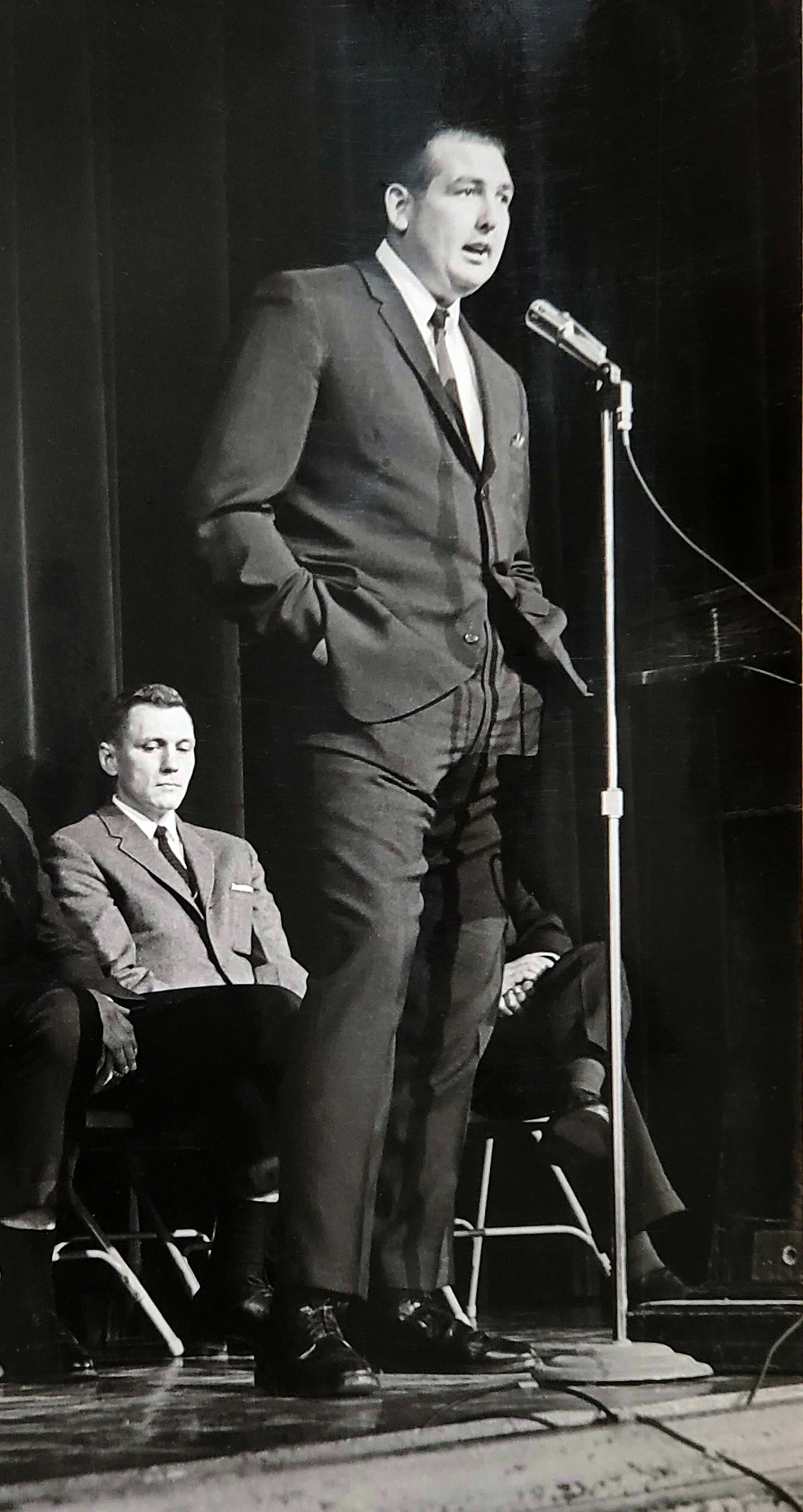

No. 78, 72
- Position: Defensive lineman

Personal information
- Born: October 16, 1939; Broken Bow, Oklahoma, U.S.
- Died: April 23, 2025 (aged 85); Plano, Texas, U.S.
- Listed height: 6 ft 5 in (1.96 m)
- Listed weight: 270 lb (122 kg)

Career information
- High school: Broken Bow
- College: Oklahoma State
- NFL draft: 1961: 6th round, 79th overall pick
- AFL draft: 1962: 29th round, 229th overall pick

Career history
- Cleveland Browns (1962–1967); Pittsburgh Steelers (1968); New York Giants (1969)

Awards and highlights
- NFL champion (1964); Second-team All-Big Eight (1961)

Career NFL statistics
- Games played: 78
- Games started: 31
- Fumble recoveries: 2
- Sacks: 8.5
- Stats at Pro Football Reference

"Big" Billy Frank Parker (October 16, 1939 – April 23, 2025) was an American professional football player who was a defensive lineman in the National Football League (NFL). He played college football for the Oklahoma State Cowboys.

== College career ==
Parker attended Broken Bow High School, where he was on the football and track team. He played college football at Oklahoma State University, appearing on both on the offensive and defensive line and captaining the Cowboys his senior season and appearing in the 1962 College All-Star Game.

== Professional career ==
Parker was selected by the Cleveland Browns in the sixth round (79th overall) of the 1961 NFL draft and by the New York Titans in the 29th round (229th overall) of the 1962 American Football League draft.

Parker played six seasons for the NFL's Cleveland Browns (1962–1967), including the franchise's 1964 NFL Championship season. A knee injury in the season opener, however, kept him out for most of the season and caused him to miss all of the 1965 season. Before the 1968 season, the Browns traded Paker to the Pittsburgh Steelers along with Dick Shiner in exchange for Bill Nelsen and Jim Bradshaw. After a season with Pittsburgh, he played one last season for the New York Giants (1969).

== Personal life and death ==
After retiring, Parker returned to his hometown of Broken Bow, Oklahoma, and opened Big Frank's Sports Center, Convenience Store & Gas Station in nearby Hochatown. After recovering from leukemia, Parker sold the store and worked as a pipeline inspector.

Parker died in Plano, Texas on April 23, 2025, at the age of 85.
