= 1961 All-America college football team =

Official list of the best college football players of 1961

The 1961 All-America college football team is composed of college football players who were selected as All-Americans by various organizations and writers that chose All-America college football teams in 1961. The six selectors recognized by the NCAA as "official" for the 1961 season are (1) the American Football Coaches Association (AFCA), (2) the Associated Press (AP), (3) the Football Writers Association of America (FWAA), (4) the Newspaper Enterprise Association (NEA), (5) the Sporting News, and (6) the United Press International (UPI).

== Consensus All-Americans ==
For the year 1961, the NCAA recognizes six published All-American teams as "official" designations for purposes of its consensus determinations. The following chart identifies the NCAA-recognized consensus All-Americans and displays which first-team designations they received.

Name	Position	School	Number	Official	Other
Roy Winston	Guard	LSU	6/6	AFCA, AP, FWAA, NEA, SN, UPI	CP, Time, WC
Ernie Davis	Halfback	Syracuse	6/6	AFCA, AP, FWAA, NEA, SN, UPI	CP, Time, WC
Bob Ferguson	Fullback	Ohio State	6/6	AFCA, AP, FWAA, NEA, SN, UPI	CP, Time, WC
Billy Neighbors	Tackle	Alabama	6/6	AFCA, AP, FWAA, NEA, SN, UPI	CP, WC
Jimmy Saxton	Halfback	Texas	6/6	AFCA, AP, FWAA, NEA, SN, UPI	CP, WC
Gary Collins	End	Maryland	5/6	AFCA, FWAA, NEA, SN, UPI	CP, Time, WC
Joe Romig	Guard	Colorado	5/6	AFCA, FWAA, NEA, SN, UPI	WC
Alex Kroll	Center	Rutgers	5/6	AFCA, AP, FWAA, NEA, UPI	WC
Sandy Stephens	Quarterback	Minnesota	5/6	AP, FWAA, NEA, SN, UPI	WC
Bill Miller	End	Miami (Fla.)	4/6	AP, FWAA, NEA, SN	Time, WC
Merlin Olsen	Tackle	Utah State	4/6	AP, FWAA, NEA, UPI	Time, WC

== All-American selections for 1961 ==
=== Ends ===
- Gary Collins, Maryland (AFCA-1, AP-2, FWAA, NEA-1, SN, UPI-1, CP-1, Time, WC)
- Bill Miller, Miami (Fla.) (AP-1, FWAA, NEA-1, SN, UPI-2, CP-2, Time, WC)
- Greg Mather, Navy (AFCA-2, AP-3, FWAA, UPI-2, CP-1, NEA-2)
- Jerry Hillebrand, Colorado (AFCA-3, AP-1, FWAA, NEA-2)
- Pat Richter, Wisconsin (AFCA-2, AP-2, UPI-1, CP-3)
- Robert Mitinger, Penn State (AFCA-1, UPI-3, CP-3)
- Hugh Campbell, Washington State (AFCA-3, AP-3, NEA-3, UPI-3)
- Tom Hutchinson, Kentucky (NEA-3, CP-2)

=== Tackles ===
- Billy Neighbors, Alabama (AFCA-1, AP-1, FWAA [guard], NEA-1, SN, UPI-1, CP-1, WC)
- Merlin Olsen, Utah State (AFCA-2, AP-1, FWAA, NEA-1, UPI-1, CP-3, Time, WC)
- Bobby Bell, Minnesota (AFCA-1, AP-3, FWAA, NEA-2, SN, UPI-2, CP-1)
- Ed Blaine, Missouri (AP-2, FWAA, NEA-3)
- Don Talbert, Texas (FWAA, NEA-3, UPI-3, CP-2)
- Fate Echols, Northwestern (Time)
- Steve Barnett, Oregon (AP-2)
- Jim Dunaway, Ole Miss (AFCA-2, UPI-2, CP-3)
- Dave Behrman, Michigan State (NEA-2)
- Art Gregory, Duke (AP-3)
- Al Hinton, Iowa (AFCA-3)
- Marshall Shirk, UCLA (AFCA-3)
- Bob Asack, Columbia (CP-2)

=== Guards ===
- Roy Winston, LSU (AFCA-1, AP-1, FWAA, NEA-1, SN, UPI-1, CP-1, Time, WC)
- Joe Romig, Colorado (AFCA-1, FWAA, NEA-1, SN, UPI-1, CP-2, WC)
- Dave Behrman, Michigan State (AP-1, FWAA, UPI-3 [tackle])
- Nick Buoniconti, Notre Dame (AFCA-2, NEA-3, UPI-2, CP-1)
- Bookie Bolin, Mississippi (Time)
- Mike Ingram, Ohio State (AFCA-2, AP-2, UPI-2)
- Dave Watson, Georgia Tech (AP-2)
- Stan Sczurek, Purdue (AP-3, NEA-2, UPI-3, CP-3)
- Larry Vignali, Pitt (AFCA-3, AP-3, NEA-2, UPI-3)
- Jim LeCompte, North Carolina (NEA-3)
- Jim Skaggs, Washington (AFCA-3)
- Jean Berry, Duke (CP-2)
- Herby Adkins, Baylor (CP-3)

=== Centers ===
- Alex Kroll, Rutgers (AFCA-1, AP-1, FWAA, NEA-1, UPI-1, CP-2, WC)
- Bill Van Buren, Iowa (SN, CP-1)
- Ron Hull, UCLA (AP-2, FWAA, NEA-2, UPI-3)
- Irv Goode, Kentucky (Time)
- Larry Onesti, Northwestern (AFCA-3, AP-3, NEA-3, UPI-2, CP-3)
- Lee Roy Jordan, Alabama (AFCA-2)

=== Quarterbacks ===
- Sandy Stephens, Minnesota (AP-1, FWAA, NEA-1, SN, UPI-1, CP-3, WC)
- Roman Gabriel, North Carolina State (AFCA-1, AP-2, FWAA, NEA-2, UPI-2, Time)
- John Hadl, Kansas (AFCA-2, FWAA-1, AP-3, NEA-2 [hb], UPI-2)
- Doug Elmore, Mississippi (CP-1)
- Eddie Wilson, Arizona (AP-3)
- Pat Trammell, Alabama (AFCA-3, AP-2 [hb], NEA-3, UPI-2 [hb], CP-2)

=== Halfbacks ===
- Ernie Davis, Syracuse (AFCA-1, AP-1,FWAA, NEA-1, SN, UPI-1, CP-1, Time, WC)
- Jimmy Saxton, Texas (AFCA-1, AP-1, FWAA, NEA-1, SN, UPI-1, CP-1, WC)
- Lance Alworth, Arkansas (AFCA-2, AP-2, FWAA, NEA-2, UPI-2, CP-2)
- Ronnie Bull, Baylor (AFCA-3, UPI-3, Time)
- Bennie McRae, Michigan (AP-3)
- Dave Hoppmann, Iowa State (AFCA-2, AP-3, NEA-3, UPI-3)
- Pete Pedro, West Texas State (NEA-3)
- Angelo Dabiero, Notre Dame (AFCA-3, CP-2)
- Bob Smith, UCLA (CP-3)
- Charles McClinton, Kansas (CP-3)

=== Fullbacks ===
- Bob Ferguson, Ohio State (AFCA-1, AP-1, FWAA, NEA-1, SN, UPI-1, CP-1, Time, WC)
- Billy Ray Adams, Mississippi (AP-2, FWAA, NEA-2, UPI-3, CP-3)
- George Saimes, Michigan State (AFCA-2, NEA-3, UPI-3, CP-2)
- Al Rushatz, Army (AFCA-3)

== Key ==
- **Bold** – Consensus All-American
- -1 – First-team selection
- -2 – Second-team selection
- -3 – Third-team selection

=== Official selectors ===
- AFCA = American Football Coaches Association
- AP = Associated Press
- FWAA = Football Writers Association of America
- NEA = Newspaper Enterprise Association - "elected by the nation's coaches and football writers"
- SN = Sporting News
- UPI = United Press International

=== Other selectors ===
- CP = Central Press Association - chosen based on votes from the captains of the major football teams
- Time = Time magazine - selected by professional football scouts
- WC = Walter Camp Football Foundation

== See also ==
- 1961 All-Atlantic Coast Conference football team
- 1961 All-Big Eight Conference football team
- 1961 All-Big Ten Conference football team
- 1961 All-Pacific Coast football team
- 1961 All-SEC football team
- 1961 All-Southwest Conference football team
