= Jerry Hillebrand =

American football player (born 1940)

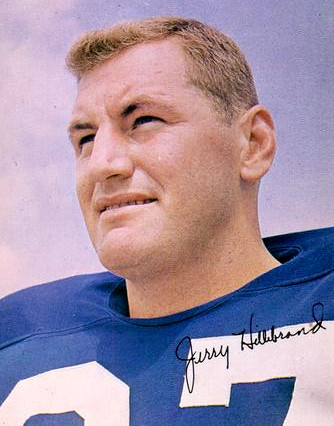
- Hillebrand in 1965

No. 87, 69
- Position: Linebacker

Personal information
- Born: March 28, 1940 (age 86); Davenport, Iowa, U.S.
- Listed height: 6 ft 3 in (1.91 m)
- Listed weight: 240 lb (109 kg)

Career information
- High school: Central (Davenport)
- College: Colorado (1958–1961)
- NFL draft: 1962: 1st round, 13th overall pick
- AFL draft: 1962: 2nd round, 10th overall pick

Career history
- New York Giants (1962–1966); St. Louis Cardinals (1967); Pittsburgh Steelers (1968–1970)

Awards and highlights
- First-team All-American (1961); 2× First-team All-Big Eight (1960, 1961)

Career NFL statistics
- Fumble recoveries: 5
- Interceptions: 14
- Total touchdowns: 3
- Stats at Pro Football Reference

Gerald John Hillebrand (born March 28, 1940) is an American former professional football player who was a linebacker in the National Football League (NFL).

Born and raised in Davenport, Iowa, Hillebrand played scholastically at Central High School. He played collegiately for the Colorado Buffaloes, where, as a senior, he was honored as a first-team All-American by both the Associated Press (AP) and the Football Writers Association of America (FWAA).

Hillebrand was selected by the New York Giants in the first round (13th overall) of the 1962 NFL draft. He was also selected in the second round (10th overall) of the 1962 AFL draft by the Denver Broncos.

He chose to sign with the Giants, but his rookie training camp was interrupted by a six month hitch in the Marine Corp, from February to August. As a result, he saw no playing time in 1962. He spent the 1963 through 1966 seasons with the Giants, starting 32 of the 49 games in which he appeared. He intercepted nine passes, returning three for touchdowns.

Hillebrand was with the St. Louis Cardinals for one uneventful year in 1967. He finished his career with the Pittsburgh Steelers (1968–1970). Overall he logged 14 career interceptions and 5 fumble recoveries.

Hillebrand is no relation to the Giants' 1944 first-round draft pick, Billy Hillenbrand.
