= Ella Mae Romig =

19th century Missionary

Ella Mae Romig (1871–1937) was the wife of Moravian missionary Joseph Herman Romig. Using her nursing skills, Romig ran the Moravian mission, including clinical services except surgery, in Bethel, Alaska, alone and with her husband when he was not at remote missions.

== Early life and education ==
Ella Mae Romig was born December 28, 1871, to Albert Fisher and Marietta Struck Ervin of Wilkes-Barre, Pennsylvania. She was their second of their three children. Her family were prominent members of the Moravian church, based in Pennsylvania, including her great-grandfather who fought in the American Revolution. In 1894, Ella graduated from the Hahnemann University Nursing School, where she would eventually work. While working at Hahnemann University, she met Joseph Herman Romig during his senior year. They were married April 30, 1896.

== Bethel Mission ==
Ella and her family arrived at the Bethel Mission in 1896. At the mission, Ella was responsible for hosting visitors and ensuring that the logistics of the mission ran smoothly. There were frequent visitors to the mission, as it was one of the few, spread out settlements for travelers to stay at and Ella was always an excellent host. Ella took her housekeeping task very seriously, and always ensured that the hospitality and care of the mission was superb. Her husband would frequently leave the mission for long periods of time, so she would take over all aspects of the medicinal practices except major surgeries. She often was the only one at the mission with the medical knowledge necessary to save lives. Ella left Alaska in 1903, but returned June 21, 1904 to develop a church hospital at the Carmel Mission in Western Alaska. She moved to California with her family in the fall of 1905. During her time at the mission, Ella actively went against the practices of the Moravian Church and allowed her children to adopt Yup'ik customs and dress, including changing their diet to a mostly wild game and fish diet.

== Death and legacy ==
In 1936, Ella had a stroke, which ultimately led to her death on January 1, 1937. Ella was initiated into the Pioneer Women of Alaska as well as the Daughters of the Revolution.

In 1997, her journals were published as When the Geese Come: The Journals of a Moravian Missionary Ella Mae Ervin Romig, 1898-1905, Southwest Alaska by the University of Alaska Press edited by Phylis Movius.
