= Joseph H. Romig =

American physician

12th Mayor of Anchorage, Alaska
- In office April 12, 1937 – April 11, 1938
- Preceded by: Herbert E. Brown
- Succeeded by: Herbert E. Brown

Personal details
- Born: September 3, 1872
- Died: November 23, 1951 (aged 79)

Joseph Herman Romig (September 3, 1872 – November 23, 1951) was an American frontier physician and Moravian Church missionary, who served as Mayor of Anchorage, Alaska, during 1937–1938.

== Biography ==
=== Family and missionary work ===
Joseph H. Romig was born September 3, 1872, in Edwards County, Illinois to Joseph and Margaret Ricksecker Romig, both the descendants of Moravian immigrants who had settled in Tuscarawas County, Ohio. He grew up with nine brothers and sisters on the Chippewa Mission Farm near Independence, Kansas. The Moravian Church sponsored his medical training at the Hahnemann Medical School in Philadelphia in exchange for a pledge to serve for seven years as a doctor at a mission. At school, he met Ella Mae Ervin of Kingston, Pennsylvania, who was studying nursing.

In 1896, Joseph and Ella were married, and the couple moved to Bethel, Alaska to join Joseph's older sister Edith Margaret and her husband John Henry Kilbuck as missionaries to the Yup'ik people. Joseph and Ella had four children: Robert Herman (born 1897), Margaret Maryetta (born 1898), Helen Elizabeth (born 1901), and Howard Glenmore (born 1911). For a time, Romig was one of the only physicians in Alaska. He became known as the "dog team doctor" for traveling by dog sled throughout the Yukon-Kuskokwim Delta in the course of his work.

=== Career ===
In 1903, with his term of missionary service complete, Romig relocated the family to San Francisco, California. He was there for the 1906 San Francisco earthquake, and ran an emergency hospital in the aftermath. In 1906, he moved back to Alaska to take a job as a company physician in Nushagak. He also worked for a time as a United States Commissioner before moving to Seward to open a small hospital.

In the 1920s, he worked as chief surgeon at the St. Joseph's Hospital in Fairbanks before setting up a hospital in Nenana for the Alaska Railroad. In 1930, he was asked to head the Alaska Railroad Hospital in Anchorage. When his son, Howard, returned from Stanford University Medical School, they went into private practice together.

Joseph Romig was elected Mayor of Anchorage in 1937, serving a single term. The same year, Ella Mae Ervin Romig died. In 1939, he was remarried to Emily Craig, who had worked as chief of nursing at the railroad hospital.

In 1939, Romig was appointed chief surgeon at Anchorage's newly constructed Providence Hospital at Ninth and L Street. He retired shortly thereafter, purchasing land on what would later be called Romig Hill. From his log cabin on the property, he started a "Board of Directors" club which eventually provided the founding members of the Anchorage Rotary Club.

=== Death and legacy ===
Romig and his second wife moved to Colorado Springs, Colorado. Romig died there on November 23, 1951. Although originally buried in Colorado, his remains were later disinterred and moved to Alaska to be buried in the family plot in Anchorage Memorial Park.

Romig Junior High School, named in his honor, was later built on Romig Hill. A grandson, Joe Romig, played college football in Colorado and was inducted to the College Football Hall of Fame.

== Sources ==
- Biography at the Cook Inlet Historical Society
- "Honored Alaskans" at Anchorage Memorial Park Cemetery
- Correspondence (1910–11) at the Alaska State Library

Preceded by Herbert E. Brown	Mayor of Anchorage; 1937–1938	Succeeded by Herbert E. Brown
