= Joe Romig =

American football player (born 1941)

No. 67
- Positions: Guard, linebacker

Personal information
- Born: April 11, 1941 (age 85); Salt Lake City, Utah, U.S.
- Listed height: 5 ft 10 in (1.78 m)
- Listed weight: 199 lb (90 kg)

Career information
- High school: Lakewood (Lakewood, Colorado)
- College: Colorado (1959–1961)

Awards and highlights
- 2× Consensus All-American (1960, 1961); UPI Lineman of the Year (1961); 3× First-team All-Big Eight (1959–1961); Colorado Buffaloes No. 67 retired
- College Football Hall of Fame (Class of 1984)

Joseph Howard Romig (born April 11, 1941) is an American former college football player. Best known for playing for the Colorado Buffaloes, he was elected to the College Football Hall of Fame in 1984. After playing football, Romig studied at the University of Oxford as a Rhodes Scholar and went on to earn a doctorate in astrogeophysics.

== Early life ==
Romig was born in Salt Lake City in 1941; his parents divorced when he was young, and his mother died of cancer when he was a junior in high school. His paternal grandfather was Joseph H. Romig, a notable missionary doctor in Alaska. Romig attended Lakewood High School in Lakewood, Colorado, where he played football as a halfback and was a state wrestling champion in his weight class.

== College career ==
Romig then attended the University of Colorado, where he played on the Buffaloes football team. He was a member of the varsity for the 1959–1961 seasons, playing as guard on offense and linebacker on defense. Romig was selected as captain of the 1961 team, his senior season. The Buffaloes had regular-season records of 5–5, 7–3, and 9–1 during his three seasons, during which the team was coached by Sonny Grandelius. Romig's uniform number of 67 was retired by the Colorado Buffaloes following his senior season. (Note: In 2020, Romig and other Colorado football players who had their numbers retired agreed with plans by the football program to begin to re-issue those numbers.)

Romig appeared in one bowl game, the 1962 Orange Bowl, which was his final game for Colorado. He was named the UPI Lineman of the Year for the 1961 season, and also received the Knute Rockne Memorial Trophy for that season. He was named to All-Big Eight Conference teams each of his varsity seasons, and he was a consensus selection to College Football All-America Teams during his junior and senior seasons.

== Personal life ==
Scholastically, Romig majored in physics at Colorado, and maintained a 3.9 grade point average. After graduating, he attended the University of Oxford as a Rhodes Scholar. He earned a master's degree from Oxford in plasma physics in 1965. He then returned to the U.S. and worked for Martin Marietta while also pursuing a doctorate in astrogeophysics at Colorado; he earned his Ph.D. in the mid-1970s. In 1975, he went to work as a consultant for venture capitalists, then in 1980 he started to do forensic investigations of fires and explosions. As of 2014, Romig was still doing consulting work in the fire investigation industry. He taught astronomy in continuing education at Colorado for 34 years.

Romig was first married circa 1966 after completing his Oxford studies; that marriage ended in divorce after seven years. He later remarried—his second wife, Barbara, worked for the University of Colorado Museum of Natural History for 40 years. Romig has served as a member of that museum's advisory board.

== Honors ==
Romig is an inductee of multiple halls of fame, including:

- Colorado Sports Hall of Fame (1973)
- College Football Hall of Fame (1984)
- Colorado Buffaloes No. 67 retired
- Academic All-America Hall of Fame (1989)
- Colorado High School Activities Association Hall of Fame (1993)
- University of Colorado Athletic Hall of Fame (1999)
- National Wrestling Hall of Fame (2003)
