= Dave Hoppmann =

American football player (1940–1975)

No. 16
- Position: Halfback

Personal information
- Born: September 5, 1940; Madison, Wisconsin, U.S.
- Died: November 17, 1975 (aged 35); Stuart, Florida, U.S.
- Listed height: 6 ft 1 in (1.85 m)
- Listed weight: 183 lb (83 kg)

Career information
- High school: East Madison
- College: Iowa State

Awards and highlights
- First-team All-American (1962); 2× First-team All-Big Eight (1961, 1962); Second-team All-Big Eight (1960)

David Peter Hoppmann (September 5, 1940 – November 17, 1975) was an American football player.

Hoppmann was born in Madison, Wisconsin, in 1940. He attended East High School in Madison.

He played for the Iowa State Cyclones football team from 1959 to 1962. He was selected by the Football Writers Association of America as a first-team halfback on the 1962 College Football All-America Team. While at Iowa state, he led the nation in total offense in 1961 and set Iowa State records for most rushes in a season (229), rushing yards in a game (271), rushing yards in a season (920), and career rushing yards (2,562).

Hoppmann was drafted in the sixth round (87th overall pick) by the New York Giants. He played for the Montreal Alouettes of the Canadian Football League (CFL) from 1963 to 1964, the Jersey Jets of the Atlantic Coast Football League in 1965, and the Orlando Panthers of the Continental Football League from 1966 to 1969.

Hoppman was killed at age 35 when his car was rear-ended by a semi-trailer truck in Martin County, Florida, in November 1975.

== See also ==
- List of NCAA major college football yearly total offense leaders
