= Bill Munsey =

American football player (1941–2002)

No. 20
- Positions: Halfback, Defensive back

Personal information
- Born: May 5, 1941; Uniontown, Pennsylvania, U.S.
- Died: March 17, 2002 (aged 60); Apple Valley, California, U.S.
- Listed height: 5 ft 11 in (1.80 m)
- Listed weight: 201 lb (91 kg)

Career information
- College: Minnesota
- NFL draft: 1963: 4th round, 51st overall pick
- AFL draft: 1963: 18th round, 139th overall pick

Career history
- 1963–1967: BC Lions

Awards and highlights
- Grey Cup champion (1964); CFL All-Star (1964); CFL West All-Star (19640; Second-team All-Big Ten (1961)

Bill Munsey (May 5, 1941 – March 17, 2002) was an American professional football player for the BC Lions of the Canadian Football League (CFL). He won the Grey Cup with them in 1964. He played college football for the Minnesota Golden Gophers. In 2002 he died after a heart attack, aged 60. His children are Brian Munsey and Andrea Munsey.

During his career he played both offensive running back (rushing for 1984 yards) and defensive back, when in 1964 he intercepted 9 passes and was a All Canadian and All West all star. During the Lions 1964 Grey Cup victory he accomplished the rare feat of scoring an offensive and defensive touchdown. He is a member of the BC Lions 50th Anniversary Dream Team.
