= Loren Schweninger =

American historian

Loren Lance Schweninger (born January 7, 1942) is a history professor emeritus at the University of North Carolina at Greensboro and an author. He has written books on African American history including James T. Rapier and African American property owners in the South. In 2019, his book on freedom suits was published.

He has appeared on The Charlie Rose Show and C-SPAN.

== Work ==
- James T. Rapier and Reconstruction (1972)
- In Search of the Promised Land: A Slave Family in the Old South, co-author with John Hope Franklin
- Black Property Owners in the South, 1790-1915
- The Southern Debate Over Slavery, editor (2007)
- Families in Crisis in the Old South: Divorce, Slavery, and the Law (2012)
- Appealing for Liberty: Freedom Suits in the South, Oxford University Press, New York (2019)
