= 1961 All-Big Eight Conference football team =

American all-star college football team

The 1961 All-Big Eight Conference football team consists of American football players chosen by various organizations for All-Big Eight Conference teams for the 1961 college football season. The selectors for the 1961 season included the Associated Press (AP) and the United Press International (UPI). Players selected as first-team players by both the AP and UPI are designated in bold.

== All-Big Eight selections ==
=== Backs ===
- **John Hadl**, Kansas (AP-1; UPI-1)
- **Dave Hoppmann**, Iowa State (AP-1; UPI-1)
- **Curtis McClinton**, Kansas (AP-1; UPI-1)
- Bill Thornton, Nebraska (AP-1; UPI-2)
- Gale Weidner, Colorado (AP-2; UPI-1)
- Jim Dillard, Oklahoma St. (AP-2; UPI-2)
- Jimmy Carpenter, Oklahoma (AP-2)
- Loren Schweninger, Colorado (AP-2)
- Mike McClellan, Oklahoma (UPI-2)

=== Ends ===
- **Jerry Hillebrand**, Colorado (AP-1; UPI-1)
- **Conrad Hitchler**, Missouri (AP-1; UPI-1)
- Ken Blair, Colorado (AP-2)
- Dan Purcell, Nebraska (AP-2; UPI-2)
- Ronny Payne, Oklahoma (UPI-2)

=== Tackles ===
- **Ed Blaine**, Missouri (AP-1; UPI-1)
- **Billy White**, Oklahoma (AP-1; UPI-1)
- Bucky Wegener, Missouri (AP-2; UPI-2)
- Frank Parker, Oklahoma St. (AP-2; UPI-2)

=== Guards ===
- **Joe Romig**, Colorado (AP-1; UPI-1) (College Football Hall of Fame)
- **Dan Celoni**, Iowa State (AP-1; UPI-1)
- Elvin Basham, Kansas (AP-2; UPI-2)
- Paul Garvis, Missouri (AP-2)
- Paul Henley, Missouri (UPI-2)

=== Centers ===
- **Walter Klinker**, Colorado (AP-1; UPI-1)
- Kent Staab, Kansas (AP-2; UPI-2)

== Key ==
AP = Associated Press

UPI = United Press International

== See also ==
- 1961 College Football All-America Team
